= List of baseball parks in Houston =

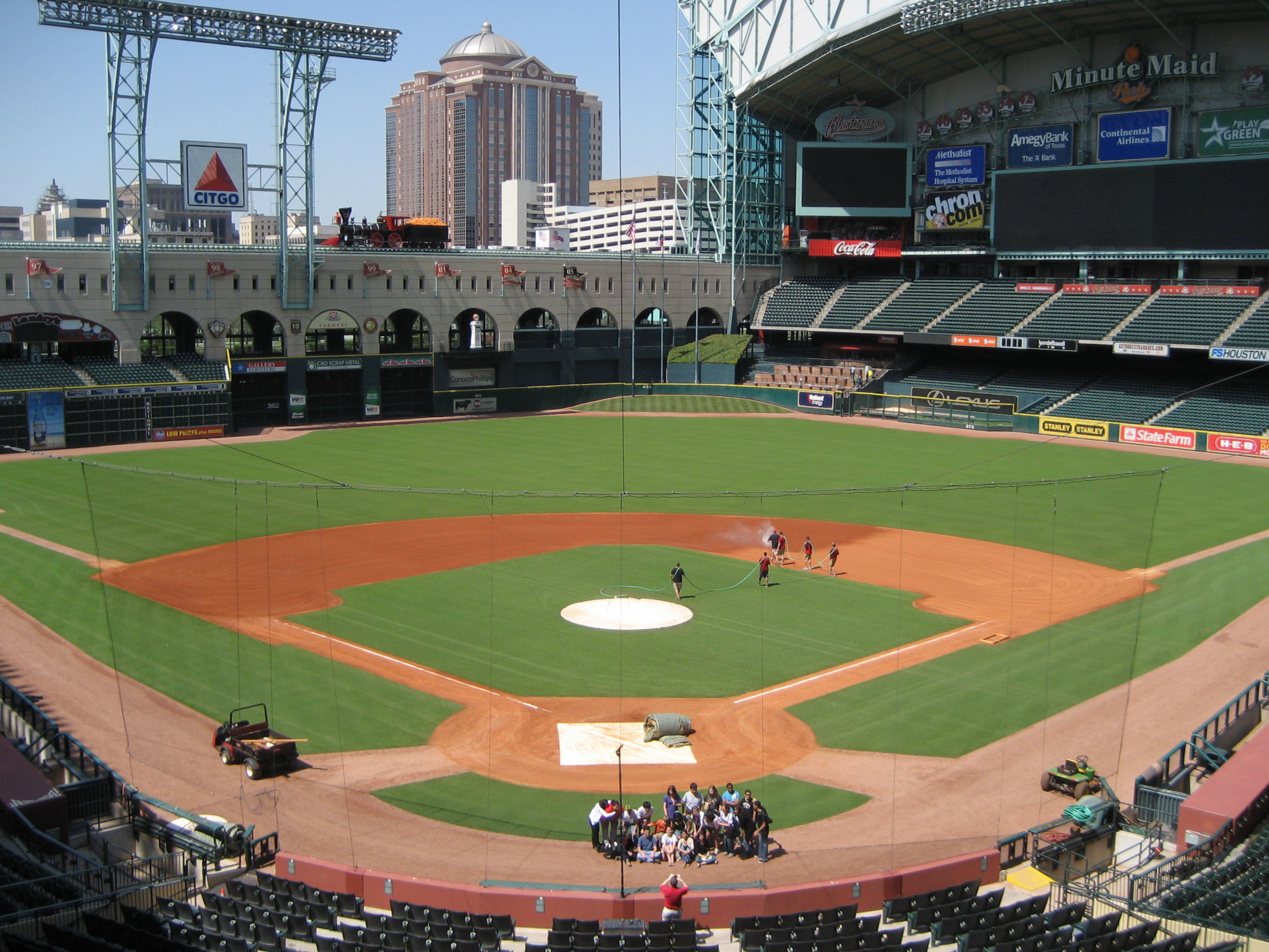
Daikin Park

This is a list of venues used for professional baseball in Houston, Texas. The information is a compilation of the information contained in the references listed.

Herald Park a.k.a. League Park, Fair Ground Park, and Houston Base Ball Park
Occupants:

Houston Nationals – Texas League (1884)
Houston Heralds – Independent (1887)
Houston Buffaloes (a.k.a. Babies and Lambs) – Texas League (1888–1904)

Location: At the intersection of Travis Street and McGowen Street in modern-day Midtown

West End Park – opened 1905
Occupants:

Houston Buffaloes – South Texas League (1905–1906)
Houston Buffaloes – Texas League (1907–1927)

Location: at Bagby Street and Jefferson Avenue (south, outside right field); Howe Street (east, left field); Andrews Street (north, third base); Heiner Street (west, first base)
Currently: approach ramps for Gulf Freeway (Interstate 45) and electrical power substation

Buffalo Stadium a.k.a. Busch Stadium
Occupants:

Houston Buffaloes – Texas League (1928–1942,1946–1958)
Houston Buffaloes – American Association (1959–1961)
Houston Eagles – Negro American League (1949–1950)

Location: Leeland Street (north, left field); St. Bernard (now Cullen Boulevard) (east, right field); Coyle Street (south, first base); Milby Street (west, third base); in the East End
Currently: Fingers Furniture Center and Houston Sports Museum

Colt Stadium
Occupant: Houston Colt .45s (Astros) – National League (1962–1964)
Location: just north of Astrodome – on North Stadium Drive (east, right field);
Currently: Reliant Center and parking lot

Astrodome
Occupant: Houston Astros – National League (1965–1999)
Location: 8400 Kirby Drive (west); Fannin Street (east); Interstate 610 (south)

Daikin Park prev. Enron Field, then Astros Field, then Minute Maid Park
Occupant: Houston Astros – National League (2000–2012), American League (2013–present)

Also used as a neutral site in the 2020 MLB postseason

Location: 501 Crawford Street (northwest); Congress Street (northeast); Hamilton Street (southeast); Texas Street (southwest)
Previously: railroad yards and Union Station

== See also ==
- Lists of baseball parks
