= Herald Park =

Baseball park in Houston, Texas

Coordinates: 29.7459°N 95.3756°W

- Interactive map of Herald Park
- Full name: Herald Park
- Former names: Houston Base Ball Park
- Location: 802 McGowen Street; Houston, Texas
- Owner: Houston Electric Company
- Operator: Houston Baseball Association
- Field size: LF 310; CF 403; RF 310

Construction
- Opened: 1884
- Renovated: 1896, 1898, 1903
- Closed: July 2, 1904
- Demolished: 1904

Tenants
- Houston Nationals (TL) (1884); Houston Heralds (1887); Louisville Colonels (MLB/spring training) (1895); St. Louis Cardinals (MLB/spring training) (1904); Houston Buffaloes (STL, TL) (1888–1904)

Herald Park (also known as Houston Base Ball Park, Fair Ground Park, and League Park) was a baseball park located in Houston, Texas and was the home of the Houston Buffaloes from 1888 until 1904. It also served as the spring training facility for the Louisville Colonels and the St. Louis Cardinals in the National League of Major League Baseball in 1895 and 1904 respectively.

The ballpark existed near the Houston fairgrounds at the intersection of Milam Street and McGowen Street on the eastern edge of Fourth Ward. Today, Houston's Reef restaurant sat on the location of Herald Park until it closed in 2019. In 2016, the Texas Historical Commission commemorated the ballpark by placing a historical marker on the location.

== History ==
=== Planning and construction ===
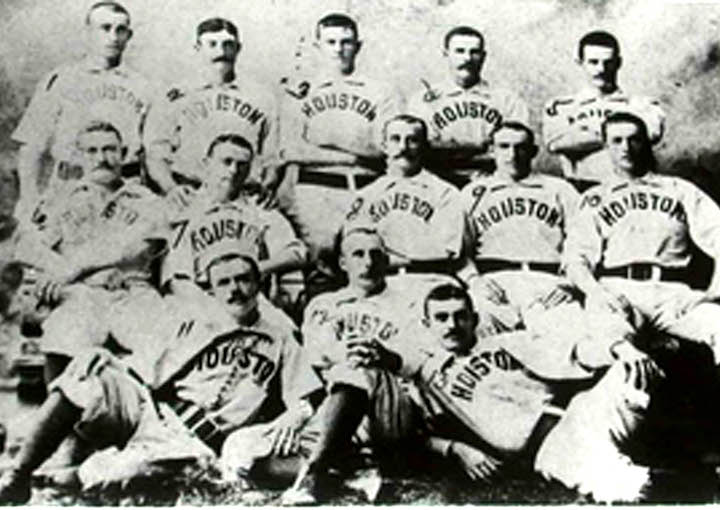
Herald Park was the home of the 1889 Houston Mud Cats team that won the Texas League pennant

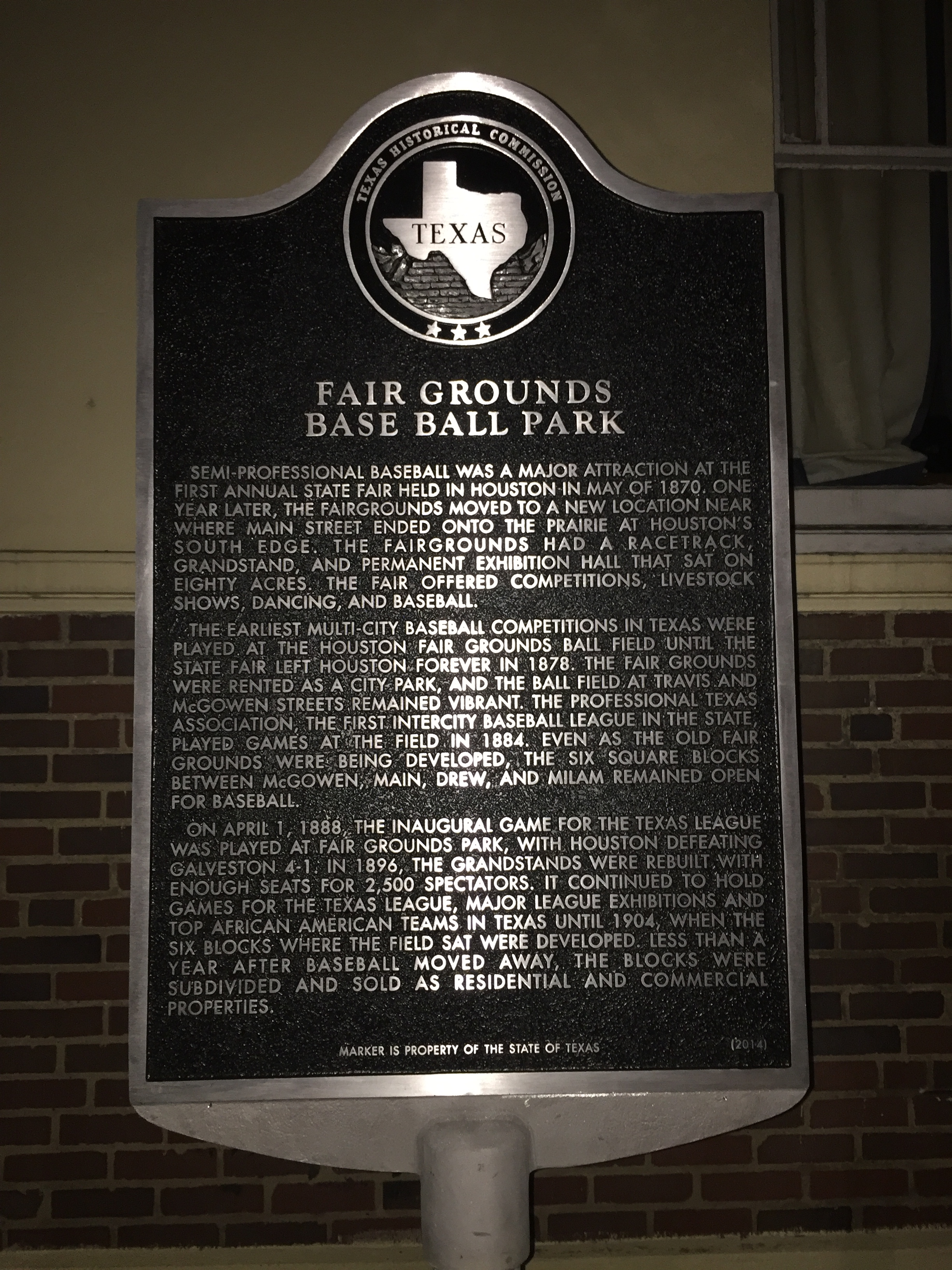
Texas State Historical Marker for the ballpark

On July 2, 1884, a meeting was held in the office J. W. Mitchell that decided to issue 120 shares of stock at $10 each for the purpose of preparing a baseball park. Mitchell, along with W. H. Coyle and Colonel Will Childress headed a committee to sell such shares. Built in a largely unpopulated area of prairie land, on the grounds of the State Fair of Texas, fences and a grandstand were erected on the site by 1885.

=== Regular use ===
The ballpark became the home of the semi-professional Houston Heralds club in 1887, and the site became known as "Herald Park". The Heralds were named as such because their owner, William H. Bailey, also owned the local newspaper called the Houston Herald. Although the Heralds team ceased after that season, many continued to refer to the ballpark by this name well into the 20th century.

Two big-league ball clubs barnstormed through Houston in 1887, the New York Giants and the St. Louis Browns, and played at Herald Park. When the Browns played, they faced a team composed of five from the Chicago White Stockings, two from the Pittsburgh Alleghenys, and two from Cincinnati Red Stockings. The Red Stockings as a whole returned to Houston the following season, but this time as the opponent of Houston's first fully professional ball club in their first ever game.

Herald Park was the site of the first modern Texas League game between Houston and Galveston on April 1, 1888. Houston won the game 4–1.

On April 28, 1889, a mysterious fire burned down the grandstand, the ladies stand, reporters' stand, and soda stand. Rebuilt soon thereafter, none of the property was insured, and an estimated total cost of damage was $1,200 (equivalent to $43,000 in 2025).

The first night game was held at Herald Park on July 22, 1892, when Houston manager John McCloskey ordered arc lights to be placed on the field in a game against Galveston.

The Louisville Colonels of the National League became the first big league ball club to come to Houston for spring training in 1895 as Herald Park was their home, while the Chicago White Stockings (now known as the Chicago Cubs) made their home in nearby Galveston. The two teams played each other frequently with the use of the interurban.

In 1898, the ballpark received renovations when the left field fence was moved one hundred feet and the diamond moved fifty feet out toward Main Street. A plank for fans to walk from the streetcar landing to the gate was also added.

The ballpark served as the spring training facility for the St. Louis Cardinals, also of the National League, in 1904. It was the beginning of a long history of that club with Houston, as they returned for spring training in 1906 through 1908 at West End Park, and then purchased an eighteen percent share of the Houston Buffaloes before making them the first minor league farm team in 1921.

=== Redevelopment, closure, and demolition ===
The ballpark's demise was foreshadowed by a 1903 meeting of the Fourth Ward Civic Club, where they advocated removal of the park. Although owned by the Houston Electric Company throughout the majority of its existence, the ball park was sold to a real estate development company before the beginning of the 1904 season. However, on April 5, 1904, it was announced that Houston would continue to use the ballpark at least until August because the developers were not yet ready to build on the site. Throughout the season, development did eventually begin before August, and the size of the field was necessarily modified. Game rules became inventive to accommodate the shrunken size.

Houston's professional baseball team played its last game at the park against the Beaumont Millionaires on July 1, 1904. West End Park, the permanent successor to Herald Park, was constructed and opened in April 1905.

== Notable events ==
=== Birth of the "Texas Leaguer" ===
Houston center fielder Ollie Pickering set a Texas League record for singles in the season opener game and Pickering's Texas League debut against the Fort Worth Panthers on May 21, 1892, at Herald Park. According to the April 21, 1906 edition of Sporting Life, this game was the origin of the "Texas Leaguer", a single that falls just outside the infield, because Pickering's first seven at bats were consecutively successful in this manner. This Texas League record still stands today.

== Other uses ==
=== American football ===
Herald Park also occasionally served as a venue for American football games. Galveston's Ball High School played a game against a team from Houston known as the "Olympics" on November 26, 1896. The same Houston team then played against TCU in that university's second ever game on December 19, 1896. The next month, the Olympics played Houston High School. Herald Park also served as a neutral football site on several occasions. Texas A&M was defeated by Sewanee there, but returned for their next game against Tulane to be victorious.

== Transportation access ==
Herald Park was served by the Houston Electric Company's South End line, which provided street car access during its time. With transfers from Houston's Grand Central Station, this allowed for direct public transportation using interurban lines such as the Galveston–Houston Electric Railway and Houston North Shore Railway.

== See also ==
- List of baseball parks in Houston, Texas
- West End Park (Houston)
- Buffalo Stadium
- Colt Stadium
- Astrodome
- Daikin Park

== Sources ==
- "Baseball in the Lone Star State: Texas League's Greatest Hits", Tom Kayser and David King, Trinity University Press 2005

| Preceded by None | Home of the Houston Buffaloes; 1888 – 1904 | Succeeded by Harrisburg Park |
