= Waco Tigers =

- 1892–1905; (1892, 1897, 1902–1903, 1905); Waco, Texas

Minor league affiliations
- Class: Class B (1892); Class C (1897); Class D (1902–1903); Class C (1905)
- League: Texas League (1892, 1897, 1902–1903, 1905)

Major league affiliations
- Team: None

Minor league titles
- League titles (0): None
- Conference titles: 1
- Wild card berths (1): 1903

Team data
- Name: Waco Tigers (1892, 1897, 1902); Waco Steers (1903); Waco Tigers 1905
- Ballpark: Padgitt Park; Katy Park (1905)

The Waco Tigers were a minor league baseball team based in Waco, Texas. Between 1892 and 1905, the Tigers played in four non–consecutive seasons as members of the Texas League, with three of the seasons being partial seasons of play. The Waco Tigers hosted home minor league games at Padgitt Park until 1905, when the Tigers began play at Katy Park. The Tigers were succeeded by the 1906 Waco Navigators, who continued Waco's membership in the Texas League through 1919.

== History ==
In 1889 and 1890, the Tigers were preceded in minor league play by the Waco "Babies," who played both seasons as members of the independent Texas League.

The 1892 Waco "Tigers" rejoined the Texas League, which had evolved to become a Class B level league. Waco joined the league during the season. Waco joined the league on July 23, 1892 with the San Antonio Missions, with those two teams replacing the Dallas Hams and Fort Worth Panthers, who had folded on July 7, 1892. Waco ended their season with a record of 15–18, playing the season under manager Pat Flaherty. No playoffs were held after the Houston Mudcats won both half-season standings. Waco had the third best winning percentage in the league. The Texas League did not return to play in 1893.

The Waco Tigers returned to minor league play in the 1897 season when the "Sherman–Denison Students" team of the Texas League relocated to Waco during the season. On July 15, 1897, the Students moved to Waco with a 44–41 record. After compiling a 19–16 record while based in Waco, The Sherman–Denison/Waco Tigers team ended the 1897 season with an overall record of 63–57. The team was managed by Pete Weckbecker, Pearce Chiles and Joe Dowie. The team placed second in the eight–team Class C level league standings, finishing 8.5 games behind the first place Galveston Sand Crabs. In 1898, the Texas League reduced to six teams, without a Waco team.

After a three year absence from the Texas League, the Waco Tigers rejoined the Class D level league for the 1902 season, folding before its completion. On July 8, 1902, Waco folded with a record of 26–36. Emmett Rogers was the Tigers' manager.

The 1903 Texas League began play without a Waco team, but Waco resumed play during the season. On June 26, 1903, the Paris Parasites moved to Waco, where the team finished the season as the Waco Steers. Paris had a record of 32–20 at the time of the move to Waco. The team finished with an overall record of 52–56, placing fifth in the overall regular standings and losing in the first round of the playoffs to the Dallas Giants. Waco did not filed a franchise in the 1904 Texas League, as the team resumed play in Paris.

Waco played their final season as the "Tigers" in the 1905 Class C level Texas League. The 1905 team was owned by Henry Fabian and the Tigers began play at Katy Park, designed by Fabian. The Waco Tigers ended the 1905 season with a 65–65 record, placing fourth in the final standings. Don Curtis and Mike O'Connor served as managers, as Waco finished 5.5 games behind the first place Fort Worth Panthers. Waco's Scott Ragsdale won the league batting title, hitting .292 and teammate Stan Stovall led the league with five home runs. Fabian battled with Sunday laws in Waco. After being arrested three times for scheduling games at Katy Park on Sundays, Fabian took the matter to court and won at the state level. After the 1905 season, he sold the Waco team to a local businessman.

Waco continued play in the 1906 Texas League, becoming the Waco Navigators. The Navigators played continuously in the league through 1919.

== The ballparks ==
A post card of the Cotton Palace grounds from the Baylor University Texas Collection

The Waco Tigers and Steers played home minor league games at Padgitt Park through the 1904 season. The park was founded in the 1880's. The park was later purchased from owner and namesake Tom Padgitt and became known as the Cotton Palace.

In 1905 the Tigers began play at Katy Park. Designed by Waco owner and player Henry Fabian, the ballpark opened in time to host a presidential visit by Teddy Roosevelt on April 6, 1905. Used through the 1960's, when it was torn down, the ballpark was located at the corner of Eighth Street & Webster Avenue in Waco.

In April 1929, the New York Yankees with Babe Ruth played an exhibition game at the Katy Park against the Waco Cubs.

On May 5, 1930, the first night baseball game in Texas took place at Katy Park. The game was between the Negro leagues' Kansas City Monarchs and the Waco Black Cardinals, a local team. The teams utilized the Monarchs' portable light system. The Monarchs won the game, beating Waco by the score of 8–0.

After the original ballpark was razed in the 1960s, it became a parking lot. In 2020, the former ballpark site became a part of the "Magnolia Market at the Silos" renovation and the site was returned to a small ballpark. Today, the new ballpark at the site is called "Katy Ballpark at the Silos."

== Timeline ==
Year(s)	# Yrs.	Team	Level	League	Ballpark
1892	2	Waco Tigers	Class B	Texas League	Padgitt Park
1897	1	Waco Tigers	Class C	Texas League	Padgitt Park
1902	1	Waco Tigers	Class D	Texas League	Padgitt Park
1903	1	Waco Steers	Class D	Texas League	Padgitt Park
1905	1	Waco Tigers	Class C	Texas League	Katy Park

== Year–by–year records ==
Year	Record	Finish	Manager	Playoffs/Notes
1892	15–18	3rd	Pat Flaherty	Joined league July 23
1897	63–57	2nd	Pete Weckbecker / Pearce Chiles; Joe Dowie	Sherman–Denison (44–41) moved to Waco July 15; No playoffs held
1902	26–36	NA	Emmett Rogers	Team folded July 8
1903	52–56	5th	Ted Sullivan / Frank Coyle	Paris (32–20) moved to Waco June 26; Lost in 1st round
1905	65–65	4th	Don Curtis / Mike O'Connor	No playoffs held

== Notable alumni ==
- Warren Wallace Beckwith (1897)
- George Bristow (1897)
- Bill Butler (1903)
- Pearce Chiles (1897, MGR)
- Pat Flaherty (1892, MGR)
- Bill Kemmer (1897)
- Charlie Krehmeyer (1892)
- Sport McAllister (1892)
- Algie McBride (1892)
- Reeve McKay (1903)
- Frank Moore (1902)
- Tex Pruiett (1905)
- Emmett Rogers (1902, MGR)
- Bobby Rothermel (1897)
- Tubby Spencer (1905)
- Ed Taylor (1903)
- Pete Weckbecker (1897, MGR)
- George Whiteman (1905)
- Waco Tigers players
- Waco Steers players

== See also ==
List of Texas League stadiums
