= West End Park (Houston) =

Former baseball park in Houston, Texas

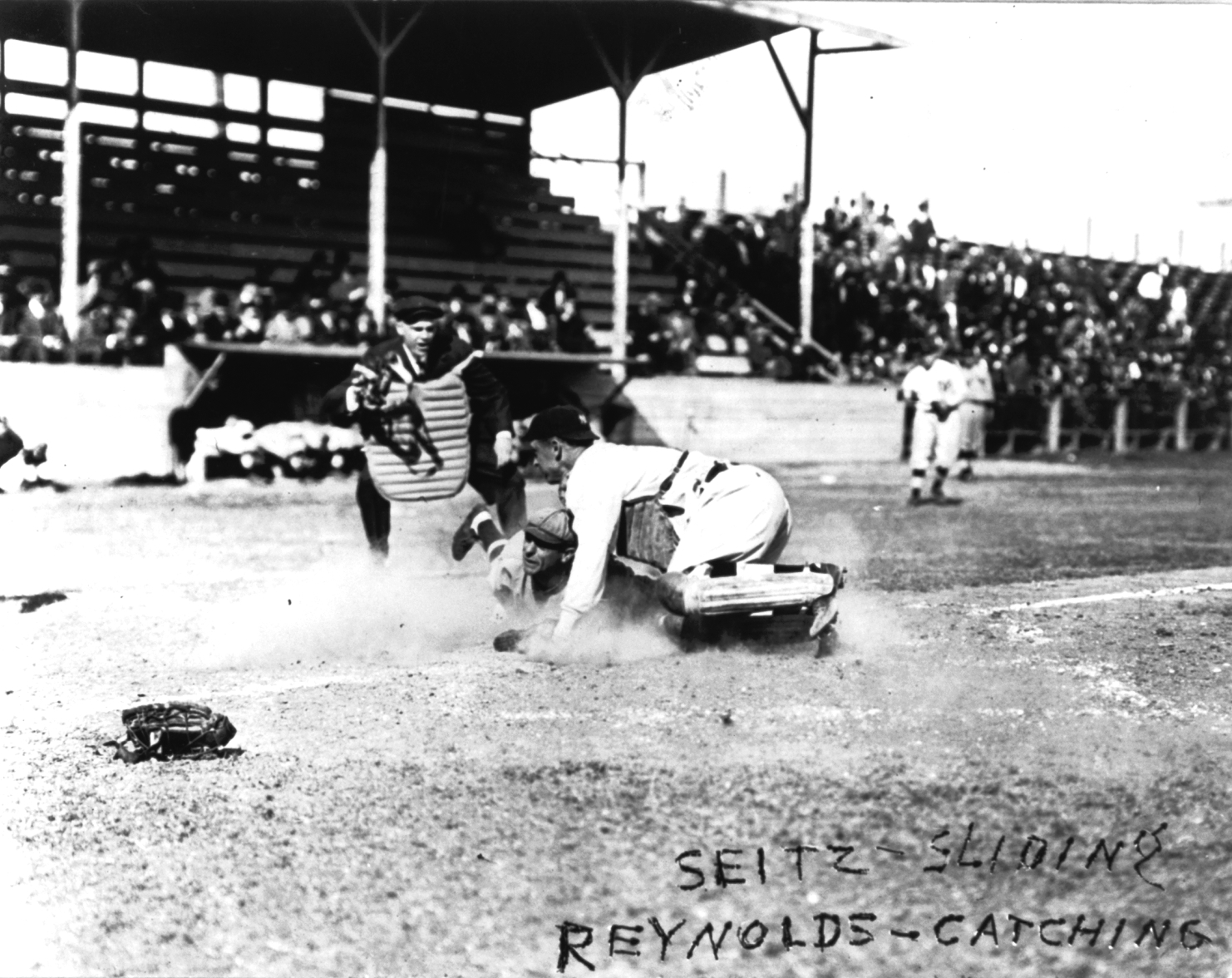
- West End Park in 1914 during a game between Houston and New York
- Interactive map of West End Park
- Location: 601 Andrews Street; Houston, Texas
- Coordinates: 29.75493°N 95.37443°W
- Owner: Houston Buffaloes (1905–1928); Houston Board of Education (1928–1940s)
- Capacity: 2,500
- Surface: Grass
- Record attendance: 8,300
- Public transit: San Felipe line

Construction
- Groundbreaking: 1905
- Opened: April 1, 1905
- Renovated: 1908
- Closed: 1942

Tenants
- Houston Buffaloes (STL, TL) 1905–1927; St. Louis Cardinals (MLB/spring training) 1906–1908; St. Louis Browns (MLB/spring training) 1909–1910, 1915; New York Yankees (MLB/spring training) 1914; Rice Owls football (NCAA) 1912, 1915; Houston Board of Education (UIL) 1928–1942

West End Park was a baseball park in Houston from 1905 to the 1940s. It was the primary ballpark for the city when it was constructed, and the city's first venue for Negro Major League games. From 1909 through 1910 and again in 1915, it also served as the spring training facility of the St. Louis Browns (known today as the Baltimore Orioles) as well as the 1914 New York Yankees of the American League and the 1906 through 1908 St. Louis Cardinals of the National League in Major League Baseball. After its use by its primary tenant, the Houston Buffaloes of the Texas League, the ballpark was sold to what is now known as the Houston Independent School District for its use until it was demolished.

Contrary to its name, the ballpark's location was not in West End, Houston, as that area had not yet been specifically designated as "West End", and the current municipal recreational park of the same has no relation to the ballpark. Instead, West End Park was located in the freedmen's town area of the Fourth Ward, bounded by Andrews Street to the north, Heiner Street to the west, and Howe Street to the east. Behind the right field fence, to the south, was the inverted-V-shaped intersection of Jefferson Street and Bagby Street. The location was less than a mile straight west of the eventual site of Daikin Park. The original seating arrangement was a set of bleachers that ran from north to south parallel to Heiner Street, entered from the intersection of Heiner and Ruthven Streets. When later improvements to the ballpark were made, the grandstand was changed to a curved arrangement centered at the corner of Andrews and Heiner Streets, with the third base line running parallel to Andrews Street and the first base line running parallel to Heiner Street.

When Interstate 45 was extended through downtown Houston, the "Pierce Elevated" portion was constructed over the area where the ballpark was, from Andrews Street to the Bagby Street exit.

== History ==
=== Planning and construction ===
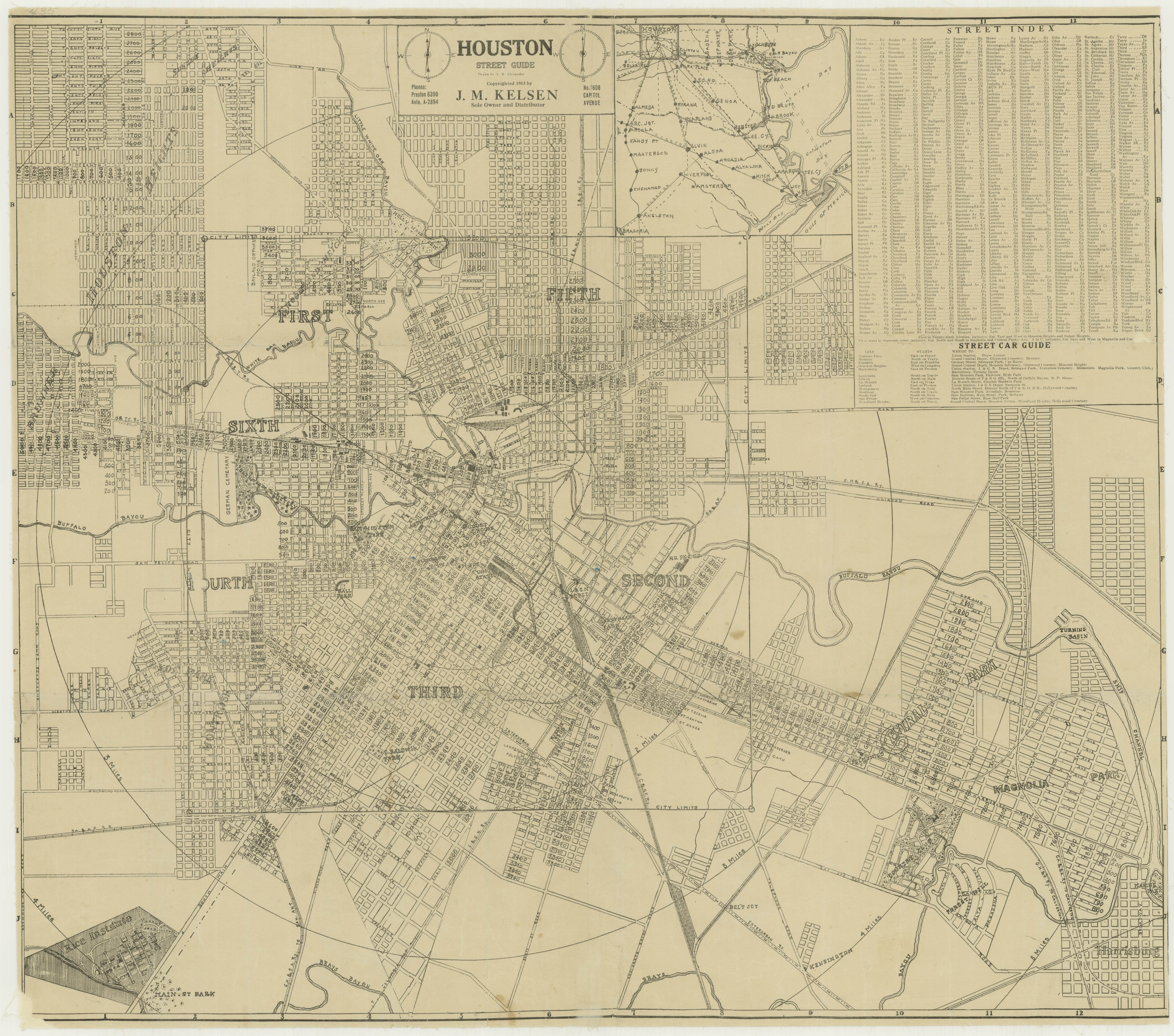
Section of a map of Houston from 1913, showing the location of the park. (Select the image to view the full map.)

Construction of a new ballpark in Houston became necessary after the redevelopment of Herald Park into a residential neighborhood during the 1904 season. While a temporary ballpark was used to host the rest of games for that season, poor transportation availability made travel difficult, and a new ballpark in the Westmoreland neighborhood was announced to be finished for 1905.

On January 9, 1905, the Houston Buffaloes organization was given authorization by the Houston City Council for construction to begin on West End Park. During construction, a sandy soil was used for the field, so as to absorb moisture more easily. By March 15, the ball park's construction was nearly completed only lacking paint on the grandstand and field preparation.

=== Regular use ===
West End Park opened on April 1, 1905 as an unnamed park with an exhibition game between Houston and the Baton Rouge Cajuns of the Cotton States League. Houston lost, 0–2.

The ballpark later received its name through a contest conducted by a committee consisting of the Houston Chronicle sports editor, the Houston Post baseball editor, and South Texas League President Bliss P. Gorham. The suggested name chosen would allow its submitter to receive a season ticket to the new park. Ultimately, John T. Schulte of 1018 LaBranch Street was chosen as the winner through a unanimous committee vote on April 16, 1905. Other names considered included "San Jacinto Park", "Dick Dowling Park", "San Felipe Park", "Washington Park", and "Gorham Park" among others.

West End Park received major renovations in late 1908 when the Houston Buffaloes ownership increased capacity to the grandstand, added sidewalks and other pavement, and introduced a new grass diamond. During their annual festival, the No-Tsu-Oh Carnival Association had originally erected the stands at the ballpark as a temporary measure, but they were soon purchased by the Buffaloes to expand the grandstand. Other materials used for renovations, such as fences and more bleachers were purchased from nearby Marmion Park.

On December 5, 1911, the grandstand of West End Park was destroyed by a fire. The losses were estimated to exceed $5,000. The grandstand roof was blown off several years later when a storm hit Houston on November 25, 1915.

=== Post-Houston Buffaloes ===
On January 5, 1927, Sam Breadon, then owner of the team, announced that he wanted to purchase land from the City of Houston to construct a new ballpark. On January 18, it was announced that the location had been purchased in the East End. Houston's new ballpark, Buffalo Stadium was then constructed for the 1928 season, and the Buffaloes moved from West End Park to the new stadium.

On August 1, 1928, the Houston Board of Education officially purchased the park from the Houston Baseball Association for $100,000 for use as school athletic fields. The park continued under the same name and continued to be used for secondary school, amateur and collegiate athletics, and for Negro league baseball games. With football being the major event for Houston public schools, West End Park was eventually replaced when Public School Stadium (later known as "Robertson Stadium") opened in 1942.

In the late 1940s and early 1950s, most of the land occupied by the ballpark was used for various purposes when Heiner Street was extended and the Gulf Freeway was connected to downtown. The eastern portion of the former ballpark location is occupied by a CenterPoint Energy substation.

== Other uses ==
The Sells Floto Circus used the West End Park grounds for their show when they came to Houston in September 1907.

=== American football ===
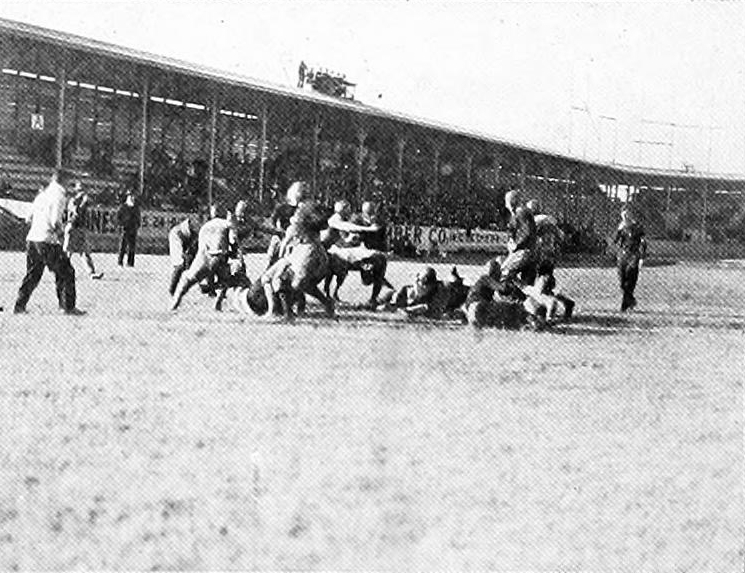
The Rice Owls playing football at West End Park in 1915

West End Park was often used as a site for American football games. In 1908, the ballpark was the host of what was dubbed the "state championship" in high school football with a game between Houston High School and San Antonio High School. This championship preceded the formation of the University Interscholastic League (UIL) that governs Texas high school extracurricular activities today.

From 1908 through 1911, the Texas Longhorns and Texas A&M Aggies played football games at West End Park during Houston's annual No-Tsu-Oh festival. On Thanksgiving of 1910, Texas A&M played Tulane there. West End Park was also the venue of the inaugural football game of the Rice Owls against Houston High School in 1912. The Rice teams moved to Rice Field when it opened in 1913.

Rice later hosted Notre Dame, Texas A&M, and LSU in football competitions at the ballpark in the 1915 season. In 1929 the first edition of the Prairie View Bowl, which was the first bowl game played by historically black colleges and universities, took place at the ballpark between the Prairie View A&M Panthers and Atlanta Lions.

== Transportation access ==
West End Park was served by the Houston Electric Company's San Felipe line, which provided streetcar access during its time. With transfers from Houston's Union Station and Grand Central Station, this allowed for direct public transportation using interurban lines such as the Galveston–Houston Electric Railway and Houston North Shore Railway.

== See also ==
- Herald Park
- Buffalo Stadium
- Astrodome
- Daikin Park
- Robertson Stadium

== Sources ==
- Baseball in the Lone Star State: Texas League's Greatest Hits, Tom Kayser and David King, Trinity University Press, 2005

Preceded by Harrisburg Park	Home of the Houston Buffaloes; 1905 – 1927	Succeeded by Buffalo Stadium
