= Greenville Midlands =

- 1905; Greenville, Texas

Minor league affiliations
- Class: Class D (1905)
- League: North Texas League (1905)

Major league affiliations
- Team: None

Minor league titles
- League titles (0): None

Team data
- Name: Greenville Midlands (1905)
- Ballpark: Haines Park (1905); Hunt County Fairground Field (1905)

The Greenville Midlands were a minor league baseball team based in Greenville, Texas. In 1905, the Midlands became the first minor league team hosted in the city. Greenville played as members of the Class D level North Texas League, finishing in second place as the league folded during the season. The Midlands hosted minor league home games at Haines Park and Hunt County Fairground Field, which was used for Sunday games.

== History ==
The 1905 Greenville "Midlands" were the first minor league team hosted in Greenville.

The "Midlands" nickname corresponds to Greenville's regional location and history. Located in central Texas, the region is referred to as the "Midlands."

The Greenville Midlands were charter members of the four-team, Class D level North Texas League. The Clarksville, Paris Parisites and Texarkana teams joined Greenville in beginning league play on April 27, 1905.

On May 31, 1905, Greenville's Charles Yaeger pitched the North Texas League's first no-hitter. Yeager won the game over Clarksville by the score of 2–1.

During the season, the three other league teams were unstable. The Paris Parasites franchise moved to Hope, Arkansas and Clarksville disbanded on July 21 with a record of 34–42. Then, Texarcana, with a 36–46 record, also disbanded.

On August 2, 1905, Texarkana disbanded, causing the North Texas League to fold on August 6 with Greenville in second place. Managed by William Owen, Richard Bendel and Cy Mulkey, Greenville ended the 1905 season with a record of 41–40, finishing 7.5 games behind the first place Paris/Hope team in the shortened season. Charles Yaeger led the North Texas League with both 16 wins and 201 strikeouts. Teammate E.D. Stuttsman had 98 total hits to lead the league.

After the folding of the North Texas League, Greenville continued minor league play the next season in a new league. The 1906 Greenville Hunters became members of the Class D level Texas League. The North Texas League reformed for one season in 1907, with the Greenville Hunters rejoining the league.

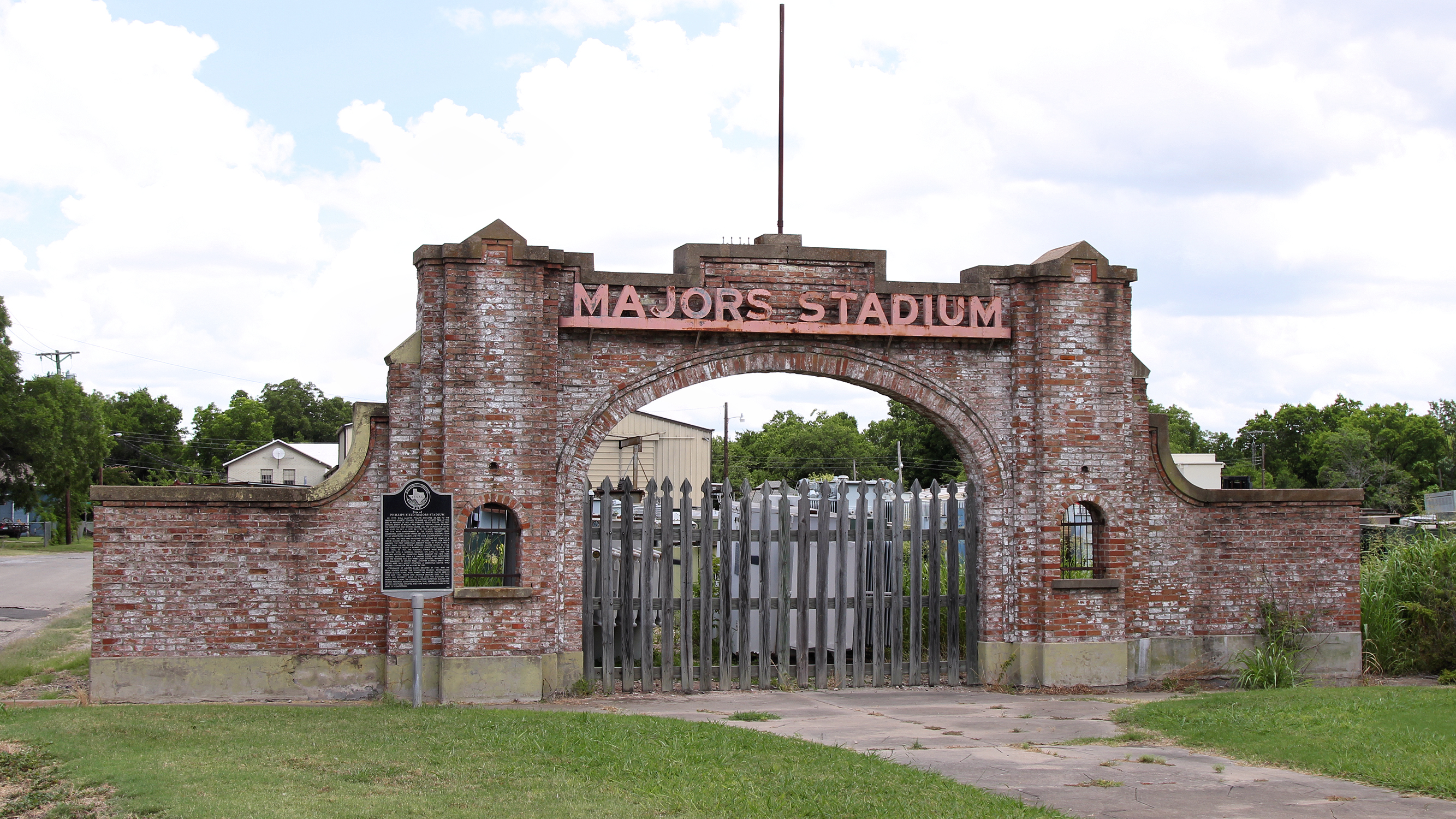
(2018) Majors Stadium Entryway and historical maker. Greenville, Texas.

== The ballparks ==
The Greenville Midlands hosted minor league home games in two locations. The majority of 1905 home games were played at Haines Park. The Midlands hosted Sunday home games at the Hunt County Fairground Field.

Haines Park was located on Lee Street in Greenville. The ballpark site lot was reportedly located near the eventual location of Majors Stadium. Majors Stadium was constructed in 1929 and destroyed in 1964, having played host to the Greenville Majors minor league team. The original entrance gate and a Texas State Historical Marker are at the site today, located near Houston Street and Lee Street.

Sunday home games were hosted by Greenville at the Hunt County Fairground Field. The North Texas Fair was held at the fairgrounds beginning in 1904. Today, the Hunt County Fair is still held annually at the fairgrounds, located at 9800 Jack Finney Boulevard in Greenville.

== Timeline ==
Year(s)	# Yrs.	Team	Level	League	Ballparks
1905	1	Greenville Midlands	Class D	North Texas League	Haines Park / Hunt County Fairground Field

== Year–by–year record ==
Year	Record	Finish	Manager	Playoffs/Notes
1905	41–40	2nd	William Owen; Richard Bendel / Cy Mulkey	League folded August 6

== Notable alumni ==
- Walt Dickson (1905)
- Greenville Midlands players
