= Algie McBride =

American baseball player (1869–1956)

- Outfielder
- Born: May 23, 1869; Washington, D.C., U.S.
- Died: January 10, 1956 (aged 86); Georgetown, Ohio, U.S.
- Batted: Left Threw: Left

MLB debut
- May 12, 1896, for the Chicago Colts

Last MLB appearance
- September 16, 1901, for the New York Giants

MLB statistics
- Batting average: .292
- Home runs: 12
- Runs batted in: 179
- Stats at Baseball Reference

Teams
- Chicago Colts (1896); Cincinnati Reds (1898–1901); New York Giants (1901)

Algernon Griggs "Algie" McBride (May 23, 1869 – January 10, 1956), was an American professional baseball player in the late 19th and early 20th century. Born in Washington, D.C., in 1869, he played as an outfielder for five seasons in Major League Baseball, beginning with the Chicago Colts in 1896, played with the Cincinnati Reds from 1898 until 1901, and then finished the 1901 season with the New York Giants.

== Career ==
McBride began his professional baseball career in 1889 with the Davenport Hawkeyes of the Central Interstate League, and completed the season with the Greenville representative of the Michigan State League. He played for the Waco Tigers of the Texas League in 1892, and in 1895 he played for both the Rockford Forest City Reds of the Western Association and the Austin Beavers of the Texas and Southern Leagues.

On August 14, 1895, following the demise of the Austin team, he was acquired by the Chicago Colts of the National League (NL), and he made his major league debut on May 12, 1896. Cap Anson persuaded the team to acquire McBride based on his outstanding Texas League season in 1895, and had expected him to take over the starting job in left field in place of departing Walt Wilmot. However, he appeared in just nine games for the Colts during 1896 season, and had a batting average of .241 in 29 at bats, and hit first major league home run on May 29 against Harley Payne of the Brooklyn Bridgegrooms. He finished the 1896 season with the Grand Rapids Rippers/Gold Bugs of the Western League.

He played for the St. Paul Saints, also of the Western League, for the 1897 season. For the 1898 season, he joined the Cincinnati Reds of the NL, and played in 120 games as their starting center fielder. He had a batting average of .302 in 486 at bats, scored 94 runs, hit 12 triples, and stole 16 bases. In 1899, McBride's playing time dropped to 64 games played, but he did have a .342 batting average, his career-high total for a season. He played in 102 games for Reds in 1900, had a .275 batting average, hit four home runs, and stole 12 bases.

McBride appeared in 30 games for the Reds in 1901, and had a batting average of .236, in 123 at bats, before being released by the team on June 28. He was signed by the New York Giants the following day, and on July 25, in a game against the Brooklyn Superbas, he provided the only hit, a single, against Frank Kitson as he defeated Christy Mathewson 5–0. He appeared in 68 games, and had a .280 batting average, for the Giants, before being released on September 17. Although he worked out with the 1902 Reds in spring training, he was not signed, however, he did play for the Milwaukee Brewers of the American Association that season, his last at the professional level.

McBride died at the age of 86 in Georgetown, Ohio, and is interred at Greenlawn Cemetery in Portsmouth, Ohio.
