= Hippo Vaughn =

American baseball player (1888–1966)

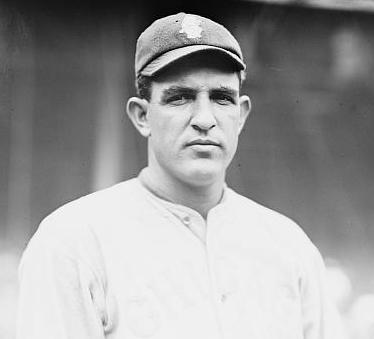
- Vaughn in 1914
- Pitcher
- Born: April 9, 1888; Weatherford, Texas, U.S.
- Died: May 29, 1966 (aged 78); Chicago, Illinois, U.S.
- Batted: Switch Threw: Left

MLB debut
- June 19, 1908, for the New York Highlanders

Last MLB appearance
- July 9, 1921, for the Chicago Cubs

MLB statistics
- Win–loss record: 178–137
- Earned run average: 2.49
- Strikeouts: 1,416
- Stats at Baseball Reference

Teams
- New York Highlanders (1908, 1910–1912); Washington Senators (1912); Chicago Cubs (1913–1921)

Career highlights and awards
- Triple Crown (1918); NL wins leader (1918); NL ERA leader (1918); 2× NL strikeout leader (1918, 1919); Chicago Cubs Hall of Fame

James Leslie "Hippo" Vaughn (April 9, 1888 – May 29, 1966) was an American left-handed pitcher in Major League Baseball. In a career that spanned thirteen seasons, he played for the New York Highlanders (1908, 1910–1912), the Washington Senators (1912), and the Chicago Cubs (1913–1921). Vaughn won over twenty games in five out of nine seasons for the Cubs, over seventeen games in seven of them. His highlight year was 1918, where he earned a National League-leading 22 wins when the season was ended a month early due to government restrictions brought about by World War I. That same year, Vaughn also led the National League in earned run average (ERA) and strikeouts to become the ninth triple crown winner in the modern era and the fifteenth overall. His nickname of "Hippo" came from his height of 6 feet 4 inches and weight of 215 pounds in an era where players averaged 5 feet 9 inches and 175 pounds.

== Early life ==
Vaughn was born in Weatherford, Texas to Josephine and stonemason Thomas Vaughn.

He began his career in baseball in 1906 in the Texas League, playing for the Temple Boll Weevils. He played the following year with the Corsicana Oilers/Desperados in the North Texas League. Vaughn played with two teams for 1908; he first played 12 games for the Hot Springs Vaporites of the Arkansas State League, going 9–1 before being called up by the New York Highlanders. Later in the year, he pitched for the Scranton Miners of the New York State League, where he went 2–4 in nine games. Vaughn began 1909 with the Macon Peaches of the South Atlantic League. He went 9–16 with a 1.95 ERA, although he threw a no-hitter. Later, he played with the Louisville Colonels of the American Association, where he went 8–1 with a 2.05 ERA with another no-hitter.

== Major league career ==
=== New York Highlanders and struggles (1908–1912) ===
Vaughn made two appearances in the 1908 season for the New York Highlanders. In 2 1/3 innings pitched, he allowed one hit and a run with four walks and two strikeouts.

In 1910, he joined the Highlanders for spring training. His showcase of pitching led to manager George Stallings naming Vaughn to pitch the first game of the season. Facing Eddie Cicotte of the Boston Red Sox on April 14, 1910, at Hilltop Park, Vaughn pitched fourteen innings, allowing four runs (none unearned), although he held them scoreless after the fifth inning. Both teams had eleven hits, although New York committed three errors. Vaughn walked two and struck out seven. However, the game was called after 14 innings due to darkness. He pitched a shutout in his next appearance nine days later against the Washington Senators in a shortened six inning effort, although the game ended with a scoreless tie. On May 7, he received his first winning decision when he pitched a complete ten inning victory over Boston, allowing one run on seven hits while striking out four in a 4–1 win. Vaughn appeared in 30 games for the season, going 13–11 with a 1.83 ERA while having 18 complete games and one save. In 221.2 innings, he had 107 strikeouts with 58 walks. Fielding wise, he made five putouts with 73 assists along with eight errors and two double plays for a .907 fielding percentage. He ranked in the top ten in ERA (9th), shutouts (5th with five), home runs per 9 innings (8th with 0.041), but also hit by pitch (9th with ten) and errors committed (5th). The Highlanders finished in second in the American League by 14.5 games to the Philadelphia Athletics going 88–63.

The following year, he was selected to pitch the Opening Day game for the Highlanders, this time in Shibe Park against the defending World Series champion Philadelphia Athletics and Chief Bender. He pitched a complete game while allowing one run on four hits with three strikeouts and one walk while earning a 2–1 win. The rest of the year was not as shining. After three games in April, he didn't pitch again until June. He went 8–10 with a 4.39 ERA in 26 games in 145.2 innings, having 74 strikeouts and 54 walks while having ten complete games. He improved in fielding, making nine putouts, 41 assists, four errors with one double play for a .926 fielding percentage.

Vaughn spent 1912 with three teams. Vaughn appeared for the final two outs of the Opening Day game against the Boston Red Sox, pitching in relief of Ray Caldwell. He went 2–8 with a 5.14 ERA in 15 games and 63 innings for the Highlanders, having 46 strikeouts and 37 walks while having just five complete games. On June 26, he was sold to the Washington Senators. He went 4–3 with a 2.89 ERA in 12 games and 81 innings, having 49 strikeouts and 43 walks with four complete games before being sold to the Kansas City Blues of the American Association. He went 2–3 in his appearances with the team.

=== Back and again to the minors and majors (1913) ===
He spent a majority of the 1913 season with the Blues, going 14–13 with a 2.05 ERA and a no-hitter. He was claimed by the Chicago Cubs in late August of the season. He made seven appearances with the team, the first being a four inning effort on August 22 against the New York Giants, where he allowed three hits and four runs. In his subsequent six games, he had five of them go the distance, winning each of them while only losing once. In 56 total innings of work, he had a 1.45 ERA with 36 strikeouts and 27 walks. He pitched a two-hitter on September 13 against the Brooklyn Dodgers, striking out ten. Although the Cubs finished 88–65 and 13.5 games back of the Giants, Vaughn proved to be a mainstay of the Cubs for the next couple of seasons.

=== Resurgence (1914–1920) ===
For 1914, he went 21–13 with a 2.05 ERA in 42 games and 293.2 innings. He had 23 complete games and one save while having 165 strikeouts and 109 walks, the latter a career high. He made 11 putouts with 75 assists, 13 errors and a double play for a .869 fielding percentage. He finished in the top ten of the National League in numerous categories, such as 4th in ERA, 7th in wins, 3rd in strikeouts, but also 4th in walks, 2nd in wild pitches with 13, and 1st in errors.

In 1917, he returned to form, going 23–13 with a 2.01 ERA in 41 games and 295.2 innings. He had a career high 195 strikeouts with 91 walks. On fielding, he had 14 putouts, 89 assists, seven errors and two double plays for a .936 fielding percentage. On May 2, he participated in what the record books used to refer as a "double no-hitter". At the ballpark now known as Wrigley Field, Vaughn dueled with Fred Toney of the Cincinnati Reds for nine hitless innings. In the top of the 10th, the Reds scored on a couple of hits after Vaughn had retired the first batter. Larry Kopf singled and later scored on a hit by Jim Thorpe. Toney continued to hold the Cubs hitless in the bottom of the inning, winning the game for the Reds. With changes to the scoring rules in recent years, this game is no longer considered as a no-hitter for Vaughn, but is still the only occasion in major league history nine innings were played without a hit between both teams.

=== End of his career and beyond ===
The 1921 season proved to be his downfall. He went 3–11 with a 6.01 ERA before flaming out on July 9. In his final appearance against the New York Giants, he went 3.1 innings while allowing six hits and six runs. His final two batters, Frank Snyder and pitcher Phil Douglas, each hit home runs off him. After the game, Vaughn could not be found by the team for days. In August, Cubs manager Bill Killefer and Cubs president William Veeck attempted to reinstate him back to the team. However, commissioner Kenesaw Mountain Landis suspended him for the remainder of the season, noting that he had signed a contract to pitch for the Fairbanks-Morse semi-pro team in Beloit, Wisconsin, finding it to be a violation of his contract with the Cubs. For the next fifteen years, Vaughn pitched in minor and semi-pro leagues, such as the Beloit Fairies of the Midwest League, with his minor league/semi-pro record being 223–145.

With 151 wins, Vaughn ranks 8th all-time for most by a Cub, the most by a left handed pitcher, with his 105 losses being 9th by a Cub. He also ranks 9th with a 2.33 ERA, 7th in WAR with 39.9, and both 8th in innings pitched (2,216.1) and strikeouts (1,138).

== Later life and death ==
After his career ended, he was an assembler for a refrigeration products company. Vaughn died at age 78 in Chicago, Illinois on May 29, 1966.

== See also ==
- Major League Baseball Triple Crown
- List of Major League Baseball annual wins leaders
- List of Major League Baseball annual ERA leaders
- List of Major League Baseball annual strikeout leaders

Awards and achievements
Preceded by Grover Cleveland Alexander	National League Pitching Triple Crown; 1918	Succeeded by Grover Cleveland Alexander
