= Terrell Red Stockings =

- 1907; Terrell, Texas

Minor league affiliations
- Class: Class D (1907)
- League: North Texas League (1907)

Major league affiliations
- Team: None

Minor league titles
- League titles (0): None

Team data
- Name: Terrell Red Stockings (1907)
- Ballpark: Gill Park (1907)

The Terrell Red Stockings were a minor league baseball team based in Terrell, Texas. In 1907, the "Red Stockings" played a partial season as members of the Class D level North Texas League, Terrell was in last place when the North Texas League folded.

The Red Stockings hosted home minor league games at Gill Park before the league disbanded during the season. The park is still in use today as a public park.

== History ==
In 1907, the Terrell "Red Stockings" were formed and the team became members of the 1907 four–team, Class D level North Texas League. The Corsicana Oilers, Greenville Hunters and Paris Athletics joined Terrell in beginning league play on April 30, 1907.

The "Red Stockings" team name corresponded to the red stirrups with their uniforms.

On June 30, 1907, Terrell had compiled a 19–38 record and were in last place, when the four–team league folded. Lucius Rash, Cy Malkey, Rube Walters and Scudder Bell all served as managers of the Red Stockings during the season. In the shortened season, Terrell finished 18.0 games behind the first place Corsicana Oilers, who finished with a record of 38–21 and ahead of second place Paris and third place Greenville.

In 1916, the Terrell resumed minor league play when the short-lived Red Stockings were succeeded in minor league play by the Terrell Cubs, who began play as members of the Class D level Central Texas League.

== The ballpark ==
The Terrell Red Stockings hosted 1907 minor league home games at Gill Park. Today, Gill Park is still in use as a public park with multiple baseball facilities.

== Year–by–year record ==
Year	Record	Finish	Managers	Playoffs/Notes
1907	19–38	4th	Lucius Rash /Cy Malkey / Rube Walters /Scudder Bell	League folded June 30

== Notable alumni ==
No 1907 Terrell Red Sox players advanced to the major leagues.
