= Katy Park =

Baseball park in Waco, Texas, US

- Kirksey Park
- Interactive map of Katy Park
- Location: S 7th St & Jackson Ave; Waco, Texas
- Coordinates: 31°33′9″N 97°7′50″W
- Capacity: 4000
- Surface: Grass
- Scoreboard: Hand-operated
- Acreage: 2.989

Construction
- Built: January - March 1905
- Opened: March 11, 1905
- Renovated: June 1930; July 1953
- Demolished: 1965

Tenants
- Waco Tigers (Texas League) (1905); Waco Navigators (Texas League) (1906-1919); Waco Indians (Texas Association) (1923-1924); Waco Cubs (Texas League) (1925-1930); Waco Cubs (Dixie League) (1933); Waco Dons (Big State League) (1947); Waco Pirates (Big State League) (1948-1953); Waco Pirates (Big State League) (1954-1956)

Katy Park was a baseball park located in Waco, Texas, and was used by many minor league baseball teams as well as the Baylor Bears for a short time.

== Significant moments ==
- The New York Yankees played an exhibition game against the Waco Cubs on April 4, 1929.
- The first night game in Texas took place at Katy Park between the Kansas City Monarchs and Waco Black Cardinals under the Monarchs' portable light system on May 5, 1930. The perennial Monarchs won the game, 8–0.
- The first night game in Texas League history was played at Katy Park on June 20, 1930, between the Waco Cubs and the Fort Worth Cats. Waco beat Fort Worth 13–0. This photo shows Katy Park's famous lighting system:

- On August 6, 1930, Gene Rye hit 3 home runs in the bottom of the 8th inning. He hit a solo home run in his first at-bat, a 3-run HR in his 2nd AB, and a grand slam in his last AB. Waco was down 6–2 at the beginning of the bottom of the 8th and won the game 20–7.
- The Dallas Rebels of the Texas League held their initial three "home" dates at Katy Park because Rebel Stadium was not finished.
- The Waco Pirates were in the playoffs many different times while they existed. They made the playoffs in 1948, 1953 (as the Longview Cherokees), and 1956. In 1949 and 1954, they captured the Big State League crown. In 1956, the Waco club finished as the runners-up to the Port Arthur Sea Hawks.
- In May 1953, a tornado came through Waco and destroyed most of Katy Park. During the natural disaster, then-General Manager Buster Chatham of the Waco Pirates, who had complained about the trains that went by the park's west side, found refuge in large engine car; he never had a problem with the trains after the tornado. Also, In the aftermath of the tornado, the Pirates moved to Longview to become the Cherokees for the rest of the season, then returned the next season at Katy Park. A game scheduled for May 12, 1953, between TCU and Baylor was canceled. For a while, a Texas "colored" championship had taken place at Katy Park as well, but that year's game was moved to Fort Worth due to the devastation of the ballpark.
- In 1954, the park re-opened for baseball, having been completely rebuilt after the previous year's tornado. This photo shows the new grandstands.
- In 1961, the Texas Longhorns' Bibb Falk refused to play a game at Katy Park because for many reasons. The last game of the season fell on the day of final exams, and according to the rules at the time, no games could held during final exams. The second reason was that Manager Falk did not want to play in a stadium with lights; the lights were one mile away from the ballpark. In the end, the game was not played. The Longhorns won the Southwest Conference by one game over the Baylor Bears with an 11–3 record. Waco was infuriated; Austin was joyed.
- In 2020, American reality TV show Fixer Upper presenters Chip and Joanna Gaines reopen the field as Katy Ballpark, a whiffle ball field that pays tribute to the historical site.

== Location ==
The ballpark was located at the corner of Eighth Street and Webster Avenue. It was razed for a junkyard. The Katy Field site is now Katy Ballpark and comprises one of many locations within Magnolia Market at the Silos. The building that houses Magnolia Press Coffee Company is located almost directly on the spot where Katy Field's fence stood in deepest center field.

== Sources ==
- "Baseball in the Lone Star State: Texas League's Greatest Hits," Tom Kayser and David King, Trinity University Press 2005
- "Texas Almanac 2008–2009," The Dallas Morning News, c.2008
- "Southwest Conference's Greatest Hits," Neal Farmer, c.1996
- "Silos Update: Bringing the Ballpark Back," Magnolia Blog article, 2020
