= Busch Stadium (disambiguation) =

Busch Stadium or Busch Field may refer to:

- Buffalo Stadium (1928–1961) minor league ballpark, home to Houston Buffs, farm team of the St. Louis Cardinals; also called Buff Stadium and later Busch Stadium.
- Sportsman's Park (1892–1966) was renamed Busch Stadium in 1953, and was home of the St. Louis Cardinals of the National League, the St. Louis Browns of the American League and St. Louis Cardinals football team of the National Football League.
- Busch Memorial Stadium (1966–2005), later known as Busch Stadium, was home to the St. Louis Cardinals of the NL, and two NFL teams: the St. Louis Cardinals and the St. Louis Rams.
- Busch Stadium (2006–present), or New Busch Stadium, is currently the home of the St. Louis Cardinals of the NL.
- Busch Field, home to the College of William and Mary field hockey team.
