= Houston Driving Park (1902) =

Former horse racing track in Texas

Coordinates: 29.7352°N 95.3002°W

- Location: Houston, Texas
- Operated by: Houston Driving Park Association
- Date opened: 1902
- Date closed: 1910?
- Course type: Varied

Houston Driving Park also known as Harrisburg Park was a horse racing track located in the Houston, Magnolia Park neighborhood along Harrisburg Boulevard. It was opened in 1902, and closed around 1910. The former track is now a residential area.

== Planning and construction ==
In March 1902, members of the Houston Driving Park Association and the Houston Country Club surveyed an area in Magnolia Park for the grounds of a new race track. With a capacity of 600, grandstands were erected and the park had opened by November 1902.

== Houston Lambs tenancy ==
In June 1904, the Houston Driving Park Association began work to temporarily transform the race park into a ballpark for temporary use by the Houston Lambs (later known as the Houston Buffaloes) of the South Texas League. After being evicted from Herald Park, the ball club eventually played several games at the Houston Driving Park beginning with a game against the Galveston Sandcrabs on July 29, 1904. The club received a new ballpark when West End Park opened the following season.

Preceded by Herald Park	Home of the Houston Buffaloes; 1904	Succeeded by West End Park
