= North Texas League =

Former minor baseball league in Texas

- Classification: Class D (1905, 1907)
- Sport: Minor League Baseball
- First season: 1905
- Folded: 1907
- President: Captain J.B. King (1905); W.E. Craddock (1907)
- No. of teams: 7
- Country: United States of America
- Most titles: 1 Paris Parasites/Hope (1905); Corsicana Oilers (1907)
- Related competitions: South Texas League

The North Texas League was a Class D level minor baseball league that played during the 1905 and 1907 seasons. The league featured teams based in Arkansas and Texas.

== History ==
The 1905 North Texas League consisted of four charter teams, initially all from Texas. They were the Paris Parasites, of Paris, the Greenville Midlands of Greenville, an un-nicknamed team from Clarksville and an un-nicknamed team from Texarkana. Partway through the year, the Paris club moved to Hope, Arkansas, making it the only non-Texas city to be represented in the league. Clarksville disbanded on July 21 after going 34–42, while Texarcana - with a 36–46 record - disbanded on August 2, forcing the league to disband on August 6, 1905. The Parasites finished first in the league with a 48–32 record, while the Midlands had a 41–40 record. Dode Criss and Clyde Milan played in the league that year.

The North Texas League did not play in 1906.

Reformed in 1907, the North Texas League featured the Corsicana Oilers/Desperados of Corsicana, Paris Athletics, Greenville Hunters and Terrell Red Stockings of Terrell. Corsicana finished first in the league with a 38–21 record, while Paris was 36–23, Greenville was 24–35 and Terrell was 18–38. Greenville folded on June 28, 1907, causing the league to cease operations on June 30, 1907. Notable players include Hippo Vaughn. and Bill Yohe.

== Cities represented ==
- Clarksville, Texas: Clarksville (1905)
- Corsicana, Texas: Corsicana Oilers / Corsicana Desperados (1907)
- Greenville, TX: Greenville Midlands 1905; Greenville Hunters (1907)
- Hope, Arkansas: Hope (1905)
- Paris, Texas: Paris Parisites 1905; Paris Athletics (1907)
- Terrell, Texas: Terrell Red Stockings (1907)
- Texarkana, Texas: Texarkana (1905)

== Standings & statistics ==
=== 1905 North Texas League ===
| Team standings | W | L | PCT | GB | Managers |
|---|---|---|---|---|---|
| Paris Parasites/ Hope | 48 | 32 | .600 | – | E.W. Dunaway / Dad Ritter |
| Greenville Midlands | 41 | 40 | .506 | 7½ | William Owen / Richard Bendel / Cy Mulkey |
| Clarksville | 34 | 42 | .447 | 12.0 | Ray Taylor |
| Texarkana | 36 | 46 | .439 | 13.0 | Robert Shelton |

Paris (5–2) in the second half, moved to Hope July 20;Clarksville disbanded July 31;Texarcana disbanded August 2, causing the league to disband August 6.

Player statistics
| Player | Team | Stat | Tot | Player | Team | Stat | Tot |
|---|---|---|---|---|---|---|---|
| Jack Love | Texarkana | BA | .327 | Charles Yeager | Greenville | W | 16 |
| Ben Whittenburg | Paris/Hope | Runs | 54 | Self | Clarksville | W | 16 |
| E.D. Stuttsman | Greenville | Hits | 98 | Charles Yeager | Greenville | SO | 201 |
| Parker Arbogast | Clarksville | HR | 9 | Dode Criss | Paris/Hope | PCT | .778 14–4 |

=== 1907 North Texas League ===
schedule

| Team Standings | W | L | PCT | GB | Managers |
|---|---|---|---|---|---|
| Corsicana Oilers/Desperados | 38 | 21 | .644 | – | Dee Poindexter |
| Paris Athletics | 36 | 23 | .610 | 2.0 | Robert Shelton / Everett Sheffield |
| Greenville Hunters | 24 | 35 | .407 | 14.0 | Horace Kelton / William Owen |
| Terrell Red Stockings | 19 | 38 | .333 | 18.0 | Luke Rash / Cy Mulkey / Rube Walters / T.R. Bell |

Greenville disbanded June 28, causing the league to disband June 30.

Player Statistics
| Player | Team | Stat | Tot | Player | Team | Stat | Tot |
|---|---|---|---|---|---|---|---|
| Harry Welch | Greenville | BA | .309 | W. Jenkins | Corsicana | W | 16 |
| Bill Yohe | Greenville | Runs | 42 | Joe Buench | Greenville | SO | 130 |
| Elmer Coyle | Corsicana | Hits | 78 | W. Jenkins | Corsicana | PCT | .800 16–4 |
| Jim Heigelfort | Terrell | HR | 4 | | | | |
