= Colt Stadium =

Baseball stadium in Houston, Texas

- The stadium in 1962, from the east
- Interactive map of Colt Stadium
- Location: Houston, Texas
- Coordinates: 29.6883°N 95.4086°W
- Owner: Harris County
- Capacity: 33,000
- Surface: Grass
- Field size: Left field – 360 ft (110 m); Left-center – 395 ft (120 m); Center-left – 427 ft (130 m); Center field – 420 ft (128 m); Center-right – 427 ft (130 m); Right center – 395 ft (120 m); Right field – 360 ft (110 m)

Construction
- Opened: 1962
- Closed: 1964
- Demolished: 1970s
- Cost: $2 million ($21.3 million in 2025)

Tenant
- Houston Colt .45s (MLB) (1962–1964)

Colt Stadium was a Major League baseball stadium that formerly stood in Houston, Texas. It was the temporary home of the expansion Houston Colt .45s for their first three seasons (1962–1964) while the Astrodome was being built, just to the south of it.

After its use in Houston, it was dismantled and moved for use in two Mexican cities.

== Houston ==
When the Houston Sports Association was granted an expansion franchise for the 1962 season, it bought the city's longtime minor-league team, the Houston Buffaloes, to obtain the major league rights to the area. However, the Colt .45's decided the Buffs' longtime home, Buffalo Stadium, was unsuitable even for temporary use and built a makeshift stadium until the Astrodome opened.

The stadium consisted of an uncovered one-level grandstand, stretching from foul pole to foul pole, with small bleacher stands in right and left field. One baseball annual published just before the 1962 season referred to it as "a barn-like thing." It is best remembered for the horribly hot and humid weather (and attendant mosquito population) that had necessitated building the first domed stadium. The field was conventionally aligned northeast (home to center field) at an elevation of 50 feet (15 m) above sea level.

The stadium was abandoned when the Astrodome was completed for the 1965 season. The Astros occasionally used it for running and exercising to acclimatize players to warm weather before a road trip. However, the players had to be careful, as rattlesnakes would often take up residence on the field. Monsanto engineers also used it as a testing ground for its synthetic ChemGrass, later known as AstroTurf, inviting cars and horses to ride on the synthetic surface to gauge its durability. It sat abandoned for ten years, accumulating random odds and ends from nearby Astroworld and weathering in the blistering Texas sun.

The right field corner of the stadium was located in what is now the northwest corner of NRG Center. Much of the northern half of the stadium (center field, left field and the third base stands) is occupied by a power station, and home plate was approximately located where a light pole in the adjacent parking lot is.

=== No-hitters ===
The stadium was the site of two no-hitters, both thrown by Houston, but the visitors scored in both and one was a Colts' loss. In 1963, Don Nottebart shut down the Philadelphia Phillies on May 17, but an error in the fifth inning and two sacrifices scored a run for the visitors; Houston won, 4–1. The following year, knuckleball thrower Ken Johnson kept the Cincinnati Reds hitless on April 23, but an unearned run scored by Pete Rose in the ninth broke a scoreless tie and the Reds won, 1–0. With one out, Rose bunted and reached second on Johnson's throwing error, advanced to third on a fielder's choice, and scored after another error.

=== Low attendance ===
Against the hapless New York Mets late in both teams' first season, only 1,638 attended the first game of a doubleheader on Saturday, September 8, 1962.

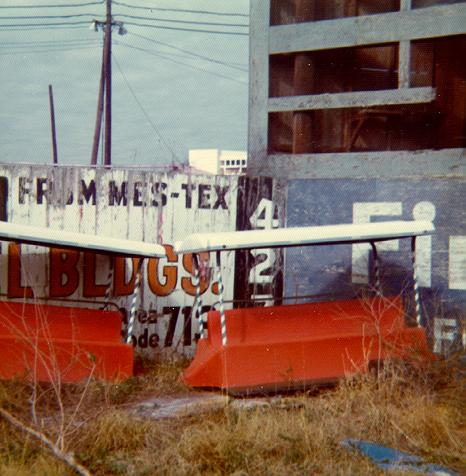
Colt Stadium junkyard, February 18, 1973

==== Season totals ====
- 1962: 924,456 (7th of 10 NL teams)
- 1963: 719,502 (10th of 10)
- 1964: 725,773 (10th of 10)

The three seasons combined to 2,369,731; the first season at the Astrodome drew 2,151,470 in 1965.

== Mexico ==
=== Torreón ===
By the early 1970s, Colt Stadium had become a county tax liability, with a lien on it. In 1971, it was sold to the owners of the Algodoneros del Unión Laguna, a Mexican League team, and was dismantled and shipped in pieces over the next four years to Torreón, Coahuila, Mexico, for use as the team's home venue. Renamed Estadio Superior in a naming rights deal with a beer sponsor, Unión Laguna used the stadium between 1975 and 1981. It was located near the Estadio Corona soccer stadium on land used today for a soft drink company. The stadium was popularly known as the Estadio Mecano or Millón de Tuercas (Million Screws) due to its resemblance to an Erector Set and its ability to be assembled and disassembled.

=== Tampico ===
In 1981, the owner of Unión Laguna, Juan Abusaid Ríos, had a falling out with Governor of Coahuila José de las Fuentes. Abusaid sold the team to the Sindicato de Trabajadores Petroleros de la República Mexicana (Union of Oil Workers of the Mexican Republic), which moved the franchise to Tampico, Tamaulipas. While the stadium was taken down in Torreón and moved to Tampico, the franchise spent the 1982 season in Monclova, Coahuila as the Astros de Monclova.

In 1983, the Astros became the Astros de Tamaulipas, playing three full seasons at the stadium, known in Tampico as the Estadio Ángel Castro. The franchise moved again after the 1985 season, this time without the stadium. The Mexico City Tigers bought the stadium with the intent of moving it yet again to serve as the club's new home, but with the venue already showing structural weakness after years in the humid Tampico climate, the plans were scuttled. Ultimately, some rows of seats were reassembled at a ballfield in Pasteje, Jocotitlán, State of Mexico, and the others remained in a Tampico playground until that, too, was demolished. El Mecano became the only major league ballpark to be sent down to the minors and the only one to play host to three professional teams in two nations.

== See also ==
- Houston Driving Park (1902)

Preceded by first ballpark	Home of the Houston Colt .45s 1962–1964	Succeeded by Harris County Domed Stadium
