= Emmett Rogers =

American baseball player (1867–1941)

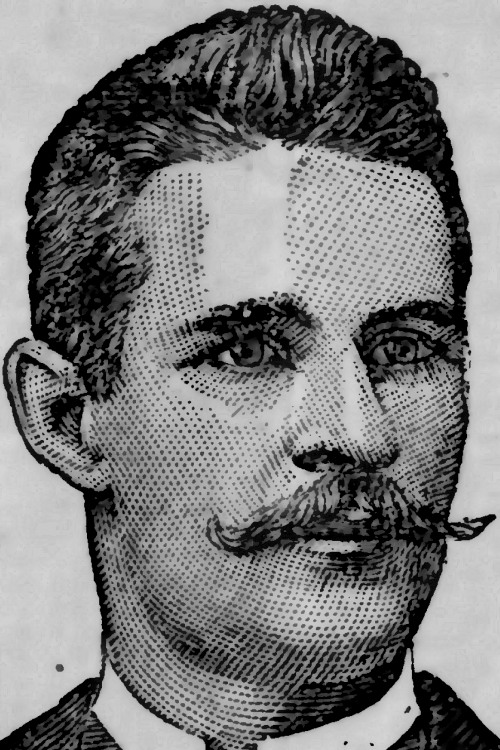
- Catcher
- Born: October 11, 1867; Hot Springs, Arkansas, U.S.
- Died: October 24, 1941 (aged 74); Fort Smith, Arkansas, U.S.
- Batted: Switch Threw: Unknown

MLB debut
- April 19, 1890, for the Toledo Maumees

Last MLB appearance
- September 28, 1890, for the Toledo Maumees

MLB statistics
- Batting average: .173
- Runs: 18
- Runs batted in: 7
- Stats at Baseball Reference

Teams
- Toledo Maumees (1890)

Emmett E. Rogers (October 11, 1867 – October 24, 1941) was an American catcher in Major League Baseball in the 19th century.

== Sources ==
- Career statistics from Baseball Reference · Baseball Reference (Minors) · Retrosheet · Baseball Almanac
