= Buffalo Stadium =

Former baseball park in Houston, Texas

Coordinates: 29°44′5″N 95°20′31″W

- Buff Stadium
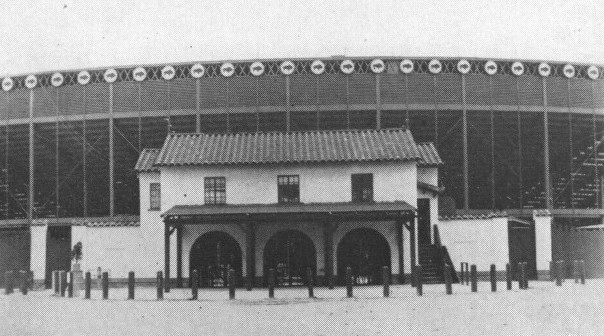
- Facade of Buffalo Stadium, ca. 1948
- Interactive map of Buffalo Stadium
- Full name: Buffalo Stadium
- Former names: Busch Stadium (1958–1963)
- Location: Houston, Texas
- Owner: St. Louis Cardinals (1928–1958); Anheuser-Busch (1958–1960); William Hopkins (1960–1961); Houston Sports Association (1961–1963)
- Capacity: 11,556 (1928–1938); 14,000 (1938–1963)
- Surface: Grass
- Field size: LF 344; CF 440; RF 344

Construction
- Opened: April 11, 1928
- Renovated: 1938, 1948
- Closed: October 15, 1961
- Demolished: 1963
- Cost: $400,000 ($7.5 million in 2025 dollars)
- Architects: Henry R. Jones & Tabor

Tenants
- Houston Cougars baseball (NCAA) 1947; Houston Eagles (NAL) 1949–1950; Houston Buffaloes (TL, AA) 1928–1961; Texas Southern Tigers football (NCAA) 1947–1951

Buffalo Stadium was a minor league stadium primarily used by the Houston Buffaloes from 1928 through 1961 (except for 1943 to 1945 when the Texas League suspended operations because of World War II). It was the site of the first night game between two major league baseball clubs, which took place between the Chicago White Sox and New York Giants in 1931. The Buffaloes were a farm team of the Major League St. Louis Cardinals and provided many great ballplayers to the Cardinals' success in 1930s and 1940s. The arrival of the National League Houston Colt .45s in 1962 brought an end to minor league baseball in Houston. It also went by the names of Buff Stadium and later Busch Stadium. It was located in the East End of Houston, bounded by a subsequently closed section of Keating Street to the west, Coyle Street to the north, and St. Bernard Street (present-day Cullen Boulevard) to the east. The railroad tracks leading to Union Station, site of the Houston Astros' current ballpark, ran behind the center field wall. Near the University of Houston, the stadium was also home to the Houston Cougars baseball team during the 1940s.

Before Buff Stadium, baseball teams in Houston played at West End Park from 1905 until 1928; Buff Stadium was built on the East End of Houston. West End Park was located at the southeast corner of Andrews and Heiner Streets, on the southwest edge of present-day downtown. Home plate's specific location, until 2013, was commemorated by a plaque in the Houston Sports Hall of Fame, which comprised part of the Finger Furniture Store.

== History ==
=== Planning and funding ===
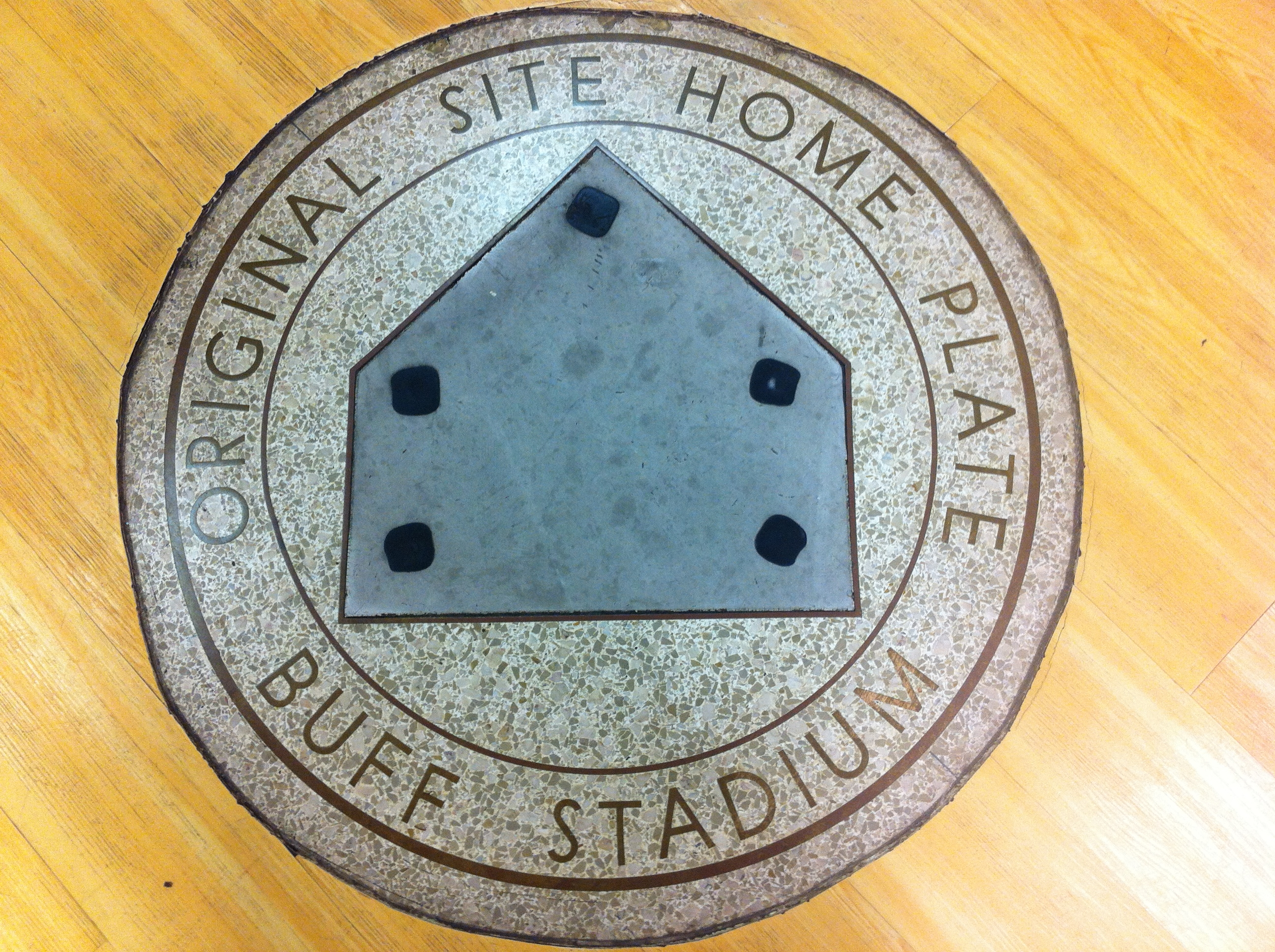
Buffalo Stadium's home plate plaque, until 2013, existed in that stadium's original home plate location at the Houston Sports Museum as part of the Finger Furniture Store

On January 5, 1927, Sam Breadon, then owner of the Major League Cardinals, announced that he wanted to purchase land from the City of Houston to construct a new ballpark for the Texas League Buffaloes On January 18, it was announced that the location had been purchased in the East End. At the St. Louis Cardinals Board of Directors meeting on February 1, 1927, money was appropriated for the site. The Buffaloes had been owned by the Cardinals since 1920.

Buffalo Stadium's name was decided on January 21, 1928 by a committee composed of President of the Houston Baseball Association, Fred Ankenman, the sports editors of the three Houston daily newspapers.

=== Regular use ===
The stadium opened on April 11, 1928, with a 7-5 win over the Waco Cubs. 15,000 fans were in attendance, and it was the largest crowd ever to have watched a baseball game in Houston at that time. Previously, the record had been only 8,300 set in 1925. Texas Governor Dan Moody threw the ceremonial first pitch, while Houston Mayor Oscar F. Holcombe served as catcher and Houston businessman Jesse H. Jones served as umpire.

On March 21, 1931, the Chicago White Sox and New York Giants played an exhibition game at Buffalo Stadium that was the first night game between two major league ball clubs. The game went on for ten innings.

On June 11, 1950 a death occurred at the ballpark during a game between Houston and the Tulsa Oilers when a fifty-year-old laundry worker, Sanford B. Twente, committed suicide there at the press box. The incident was heard by those in the ballpark as well as those listening on television via KLEE-TV. Directly after the suicide, a camera broadcast television footage of the man slumped over. The police had been told a half-hour before the incident that the man had reported to a waitress that he would kill himself. Upon arriving at the television booth of the press box in the sixth inning of a game, Twente told broadcaster Dick Gottlieb "I got something to tell you." Gottlieb, motioned the man away, and continued commentary of the game. Instead of leaving, Twente sat himself between Gottlieb and a television engineer. As the engineer attempted to remove Twente from the press box, he revealed a pistol and shot himself. His body then fell across the engineer.

The stadium nearly became home to the Cardinals after the 1952 season. Fred Saigh, who had bought both the Cardinals and the Buffs in 1947, was on the verge of being forced out of baseball after being convicted of tax evasion, and put the Cardinals up for sale. The most lucrative offer from a consortium of Houston businessmen who planned to move the Cardinals to Houston. Under major-league rules of the day, since the Cardinals owned the Buffs, they also owned the major-league rights to Houston. For this reason, the only question was whether Buff Stadium could be upgraded to major league standards in time for the 1952 season. However, at the 11th hour, Saigh took a somewhat lower offer from Anheuser-Busch.

The stadium was renamed, in similar fashion to the St. Louis Cardinals' Sportsman's Park, to "Busch Stadium" in 1958 to honor the Busch family. At the same time, the Buffs transferred to the Triple-A American Association as the Cardinals' top affiliate. Although the team was sold to Marty Marion on November 26, 1958, Busch Stadium remained under the ownership of the Anheuser-Busch company.

=== Closure ===
Eventually the stadium was purchased from Anheuser-Busch by William Hopkins after he purchased the Houston Buffaloes from Marty Marion. Initially, the stadium was planned to be expanded to a capacity of 30,655 to accommodate a potential MLB team. However, when the owners of the expansion Houston Colt .45s purchased the Buffaloes to get territorial rights to Houston, they felt Buff Stadium was unsuitable even for temporary use. The Colts opted to only use the stadium for practice, and eventually built Colt Stadium and the Astrodome.

The final game at Buffalo Stadium was a Major League All-Star game (not to be confused with the Midsummer Classic) sponsored by the Houston Professional Baseball Players Association on October 15, 1961.

=== Post-occupancy ===
The stadium existed unused when it was sold to the A. W. George Salvage Company at public auction on March 14, 1963 for a mere $19,750 USD. It was the single bid for the stadium.

Sammy Finger, owner of the Houston-based Finger Furniture, purchased the stadium, and then demolished it in order to build a furniture showroom and warehouse which was completed in 1965. The stadium had been badly damaged by Hurricane Carla two years prior. Finger Furniture built their showroom around the home plate, and retained a commemorative plaque for the home plate location on the floor in addition to a Houston Sports Museum on-site.

During demolition, pieces of the ballpark were moved to nearby Hitchcock, Texas, and stored at the Naval Air Station Hitchcock.

In 2013, the physical building of the Finger Furniture store was closed, and then sold to developer Frank Liu in February 2014.

== Features ==
Buffalo Stadium was named after its primary tenant, the Houston Buffaloes, which were themselves named after Buffalo Bayou, which divides Houston. The ballpark was very similar to the first stadium of the later Colt .45s. First of all, it favored pitchers, wind blew in from right field, and it was outdoors with high humidity. At the time, it was a state-of-the-art minor league facility at a cost of $40 million; there was a Spanish-style tiled-roof entryway with large pictures of buffaloes on the adobe wall and in the late 1950s, ladies' rooms became air-conditioned. 12,000 fans attended the first night game at Buffalo Stadium on July 22, 1930. The cost of the lighting structures was $250,000. In 1948, the stadium received substantial renovations including new seats, increased parking, more convenient concession stands, and spacious foyer.

Two large black buffaloes stood on both sides of the left-center field scoreboard facing each other. Originally, outfield distances were 344 feet (105 m) to left field, 430 feet (130 m) to center field, and 344 feet (105 m) to right field and capacity accommodated 12,000. In 1938, outfield dimensions were slightly modified to 345 feet (105 m) to left, 440 feet (130 m) to center, and 325 feet (99 m) to right while capacity increased to 14,000. The heights of outfield fences varied: left and right field fences were 12 feet (3.7 m) high, left-center scoreboard was 24 feet (7.3 m) high, and the center field fence was 18 feet (5.5 m) high.

According to sports lore, it was after a rainout at Buffalo Stadium that Roy Hofheinz got the idea for a domed stadium, after his daughter Dene wondered aloud why they couldn't play baseball indoors. That idea would become the Astrodome.

== Other uses ==
=== Houston Oilers practice field ===
In the early 1960s, Buff Stadium was used as a practice facility for the AFL Houston Oilers. Charlie Hennigan, who was trying to make the team in 1961 as a walk-on, remembers:

I wanted to play football so bad. I drove down with Charlie Tolar and there were 62 guys in the Oilers camp when we got there. We trained at the University of Houston in an old baseball stadium, Buff Stadium, and some of the guys they had in camp were out of shape; they literally crawled in there. Within two weeks, they had eliminated all but 50 of us. At that time, they only kept 33 ballplayers on the roster. Making the final cut was something everyone wanted to do.

== See also ==
- Schroeder Park
- Prairie View Bowl, played annually at Buffalo Stadium from 1929 through 1952

== Sources ==
- Green Cathedrals, Philip J. Lowry, c.2006
- The American Football League: A Year-by-Year History, 1960–1969, Ed Gruver, c.1997
- The Texas League 1888-1987: A Century of Baseball, Bill O'Neal, c.1987
- Baseball in the Lone Star State: Texas League's Greatest Hits, Tom Kayser and David King, Trinity University Press 2005

Preceded by West End Park	Home of the Houston Buffaloes; 1928–1961	Succeeded by None
