= Beaumont Millionaires =

- 1903–1906; Beaumont, Texas

Minor league affiliations
- Class: Class C (1903-1906)
- League: South Texas League (1903-1906)

Team data
- Name: Beaumont Oilers (1906); Beaumont Millionaires (1904-1905); Beaumont Oil Gushers (1903)

The Beaumont Millionaires was the predominant name of a minor league baseball team located in Beaumont, Texas that existed between 1903 and 1906. The club was first formed on 1903 as the Beaumont Oil Gushers, before being renamed the Millionaires in 1904 and 1905. The Beaumont team played its entire history in the South Texas League. In 1906, the team became the first incarnation of the Beaumont Oilers before folding.
