= Waco Cubs =

- 1925–1933; (1925–1930, 1933); Waco, Texas

Minor league affiliations
- Previous classes: Class-C (1933); Class-A (1925–1930)
- League: Dixie League (1933)
- Previous leagues: Texas League (1925–1930)

Major league affiliations
- Previous teams: N/A

Minor league titles
- League titles: None

Team data
- Previous names: None
- Previous parks: Katy Park (1925–1930, 1933)

The Waco Cubs were a minor league baseball team based in Waco, Texas for six years (1925–1930, 1933). The Cubs were members of the Texas League from 1925 to 1930 and the Dixie League in 1933. They played at Katy Park for their entire six-year existence. After the 1930 season, the Cubs were moved from Waco to Galveston, Texas and were renamed the Galveston Buccaneers. After the Cubs were re-established in 1933, they were moved mid-season to Pine Bluff, Arkansas and renamed the "Judges". While in the Texas League, there were classified as a Class-A team. During their 1933 re-establishment, they were classified as a Class-C team.

== History ==
=== Texas League (1925–1930) ===
The earliest predicator to the Cubs were the Waco Navigators who played in the city from 1906 to 1919 and the 1923 and 1924 Waco Indians The Cubs originated from a Texas League franchise from Galveston, Texas that was purchased by a businessman in 1924 and relocated to Waco the following year. The team name "Cubs" was chosen after a contest. In their first season, 1925, the Cubs played two exhibition games against the St. Louis Cardinals during spring training. The Detroit Tigers beat the Cubs 7–0 in an exhibition game in 1928. In 1929, the Cubs played an exhibition game against the New York Yankees drawing an estimated crowd of 11,000 despite the fact that Katy Park, the site of the event, could only hold 4,000 people. In that game, Yankees players Babe Ruth and Lou Gehrig were solicited for autographs while playing in the field, interrupting the game numerous times. Fans even rushed the field and stole the baseball in that game. The Yankees won that game by a score of 13–3. During the Cubs 1930 season, outfielder Gene Rye hit three home runs in one inning. The Cubs were sold in 1931 for US$23,000 (the same amount the franchise was purchased for in 1930) and was relocated to Galveston, Texas. They were then renamed the "Buccaneers". For their first five years of existence in the Texas League, the Cubs were managed by former Major League Baseball player Del Pratt.

=== Dixie League (1933) ===
Without a minor league baseball team for the next two season, Waco was awarded a Dixie League franchise in 1933 and they named the Cubs after the Texas League predicator. For the 1933 season, the Cubs were managed by Archie Tanner. They were classified as a Class-C team. That season, the Cubs hosted the first ever night game at Katy Park. Mid-season in 1933, the Cubs were moved to Pine Bluff, Arkansas and renamed the "Judges".

== Notable players ==
- Phil Weintraub (1907–1987) - Major League Baseball first baseman & outfielder
