= Pete Weckbecker =

American baseball player (1864–1935)

- Catcher
- Born: August 30, 1864; Butler, Pennsylvania, U.S.
- Died: May 16, 1935 (aged 70); Hampton, Virginia, U.S.

MLB debut
- October 5, 1889, for the Indianapolis Hoosiers

Last MLB appearance
- October 12, 1890, for the Louisville Colonels

MLB statistics
- Batting average: .235
- Home runs: 0
- Runs batted in: 13
- Stats at Baseball Reference

Teams
- Indianapolis Hoosiers (1889); Louisville Colonels (1890)

Peter Weckbecker (born August 30, 1864 – May 16, 1935) was an American Major League Baseball catcher. He played one game in 1889 for the Indianapolis Hoosiers and 32 games in 1890 for the Louisville Colonels.
