= Greenville Hunters =

The Greenville Hunters were a Texas League (1906), North Texas League (1907) and East Texas League (1924-1926) baseball team based in Greenville, Texas. Pepper Martin played for them.
