= Waco Navigators =

The team in 1915.

The Waco Navigators were a Texas League baseball team based in Waco, Texas, United States that played from 1906 to 1919. They played their home games at Katy Park.

Under manager Ellis Hardy, they were league co-champions or champions three years in a row, from 1914 to 1916. Hardy managed the team from 1911 to 1918.
