= HouTran =

American public transportation company

- Parent: Stone & Webster (1901–1951); National City Lines (1966–1974); City of Houston (1974–1979); METRO (1979)
- Founded: August 6, 1870
- Commenced operation: 1874
- Defunct: 1979
- Headquarters: Houston, Texas
- Service type: Horsecar (1874–1892); Streetcar (1891–1940); Bus (1924–1979)
- Routes: 1 (1874); 24 (1927)

HouTran was a public transportation company that served the Houston area. While its last iteration was publicly owned by the City of Houston, it was privately owned throughout the vast majority of its existence. Throughout several name changes and ownership acquisitions, the company's modes of operation ranged from mule-drawn streetcars to electrified streetcars, and finally to busses. In 1979, it was succeeded by the Metropolitan Transit Authority of Harris County, a state-authorized local transit authority, when it was purchased by that agency as the basis for its then new transit system.

== History ==
=== Original charter & horsecar operation ===
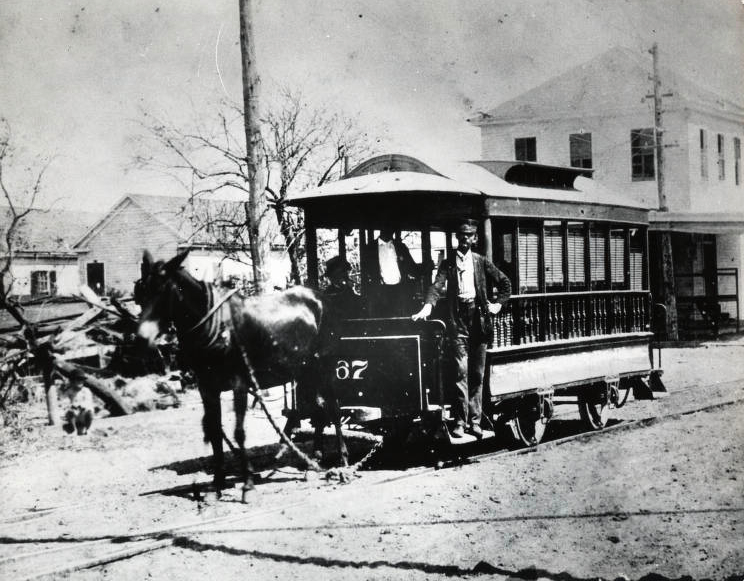
A mule-drawn streetcar operated by the Houston City Street Railway Company in the late 1870s.

The company's origins can be traced back to 1870, when the company was chartered as the Houston City Street Railway Company with J.H. Scanlan as President. However, it was not until June 24, 1871 that the Houston City Council passed an ordinance that granted the company right-of-way. Despite the grant, it was not until 1874 that it began operations as a mule-driven streetcar company. The company's original line ran from Union Station that was operated by International–Great Northern Railroad to the Houston and Texas Central Station. In 1877, the company's assets included three miles of track, fourteen streetcars, and about 100 mules.

=== Electrified streetcar conversion, expansion, & reorganization ===
By 1890, the company owned fifty miles of track, fifty streetcars, and 300 horses. That year, the company and its sole competitor Bayou City Street Railway Company that had begun operation the year prior were acquired by Oscar Martin Carter, effectively merging the companies. Martin was president of the Omaha and South Texas Land Company, which had purchased the land to develop the Houston Heights. The first suburb of Houston was too far to walk, and thus control of the public transportation system in Houston was critical to making the community work. Thus, both Carter, and Omaha and South Texas Land Company's director Daniel Denton Cooley are credited with having founded the Heights. In 1891, the company began using electric streetcars based on technology invented by the Thomson-Houston Electric Company, and fully converted from mule-driven cars by the following year.

The Houston City Street Railway Company was placed in receivership on March 1, 1894. The company was foreclosed upon and sold on May 6, 1896, then officially reorganized as the Houston Electric Street Railway Company on September 1, 1896. However, this format was short-lived. In July 1900, a committee was formed with a plan to reorganize again. The company was placed back in receivership on May 28, 1901. Under another foreclosure, it was reorganized as the Houston Electric Company on October 26, 1901, and purchased as a wholly owned subsidiary by the Boston-based engineering company Stone & Webster on November 1, 1901. It would retain this name and general direction for the next several decades.

On July 5, 1903, the Houston Electric Company developed and opened a park named "Highland Park" to encourage ridership on its Houston Avenue line. The park property was leased to property managers who would then operate the facility. It was sold to the city to become a municipal park in 1911, and its name was changed to Woodland Park in 1914. Woodland Park is still in existence in Woodland Heights.

=== Introduction of buses & change of direction ===
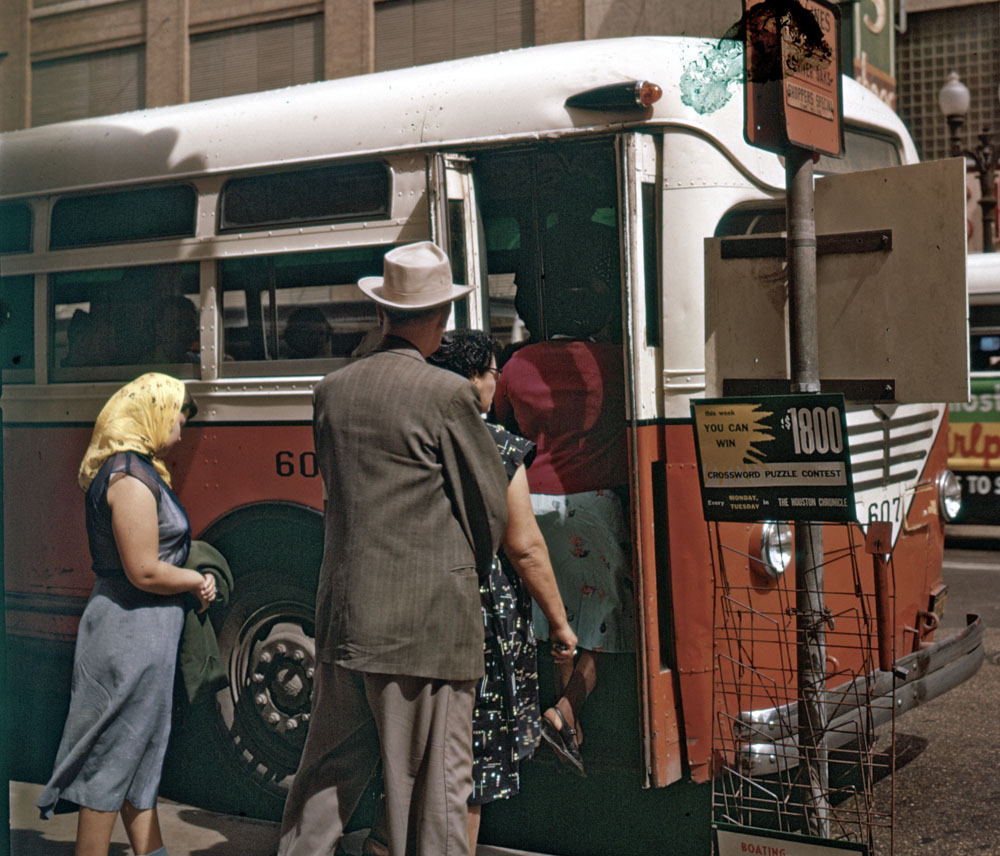
A Houston Transit Company bus in 1956

In 1924, the first bus, used on Austin Street, was incorporated into the Houston Electric Street Company's system. By 1925, two more bus lines, one to the East End, were added. Over time, buses continued to replace the streetcar until June 1940 when the entire system was converted to bus service. In 1946, having discontinued electric streetcar service, the company appropriately changed their name from Houston Electric Company to Houston Transit Company. In 1961, Houston Transit Company was acquired by new owners and renamed Rapid Transit Lines. Rapid Transit Lines was acquired by National City Lines in 1966. In 1974, the City of Houston acquired Rapid Transit Lines from Houston Transit Company.
