= South Texas League =

Minor league baseball league (1903-1906)

- Classification: Class C (1903–1906)
- Sport: Minor League Baseball
- First season: 1903
- Folded: 1906
- President: James Nolan (1903); Max Stubenraugh (1903–1904); Bliss P. Gorham (1905); Dr. William R. Robbie (1906)
- No. of teams: 9
- Country: United States of America
- Most titles: 1 San Antonio Mustangs 1903; Galveston Sand Crabs 1904; Houston Marvels 1905; Austin Senators 1906
- Related competitions: North Texas League; Texas League

The South Texas League was a Class C level minor league baseball league that played from 1903 to 1906. League teams were based in Louisiana and Texas. Comprising four teams for its first three years, it expanded to six teams in its final season.

== Cities represented ==
- Austin, TX: Austin Senators 1906
- Beaumont, TX: Beaumont Oil Gushers 1903; Beaumont Red Ravens 1904; Beaumont Oilers 1905–1906
- Brenham, TX: Brenham Cotton Pickers 1905
- Galveston, TX: Galveston Sand Crabs 1903–1906
- Houston, TX: Houston Buffaloes 1903; Houston Lambs 1904;Houston Marvels 1905; Houston Buffaloes 1906
- Lake Charles, LA: Lake Charles Creoles 1906
- San Antonio, TX: San Antonio Mustangs 1903–1904; San Antonio Warriors 1905; San Antonio Bronchos 1906

== Standings and statistics ==
=== 1903–1904 ===
1903 South Texas League

Team standings	W	L	PCT	GB	Managers
San Antonio Mustangs	70	54	.565	–	Wade Moore
Galveston Sand Crabs	67	58	.536	3.5	Ed Pleiss
Houston Buffaloes	57	64	.471	11.5	Gerald Hayes / Joe Dowie
Beaumont Oil Gushers	53	71	.427	17.0	Denny Lyons / Charlie Weber /Con Lucid

Playoff: San Antonio 7 games, Galveston 2.

Player statistics
Player	Team	Stat	Tot	Player	Team	Stat	Tot
Ed Pleiss	Galveston	BA	.360	Orth Thomas	San Antonio	W	22
Ed Pleiss	Galveston	Runs	105	Baldo Luitich	Galveston	Pct	.708; 17–7
Ed Pleiss	Galveston	Hits	168				

1904 South Texas League

Team standings	W	L	PCT	GB	Managers
Galveston Sand Crabs	82	43	.656	–	Fred Schatzke / Ben Shelton
Beaumont Red Ravens	66	56	.541	14.5	Piggy Page / Walter Morris
Houston Lambs	66	59	.528	16.0	Joe Dowie
San Antonio Mustangs	32	88	.267	47.5	Wade Moore / Ellis Hardy / Ike Pendleton / Dit Spencer / Henry Pollock

Playoff: Galveston 4 games, Houston 3.

Player statistics
Player	Team	Stat	Tot	Player	Team	Stat	Tot
Bob Edmondson	Houston	BA	.340	Clayton Robb	Beaum/Houst	W	26
Ed Cermack	Galveston	Runs	104	Baldo Luitich	Galves/Beaum	W	26
Les Smith	Beau/SanAn/Hous	Hits	171	Bill Sorrells	Houston	SO	243
Dick Latham	Galveston	HR	18	John Reuther	Galveston	Pct	.774; 24–7

=== 1905–1906 ===
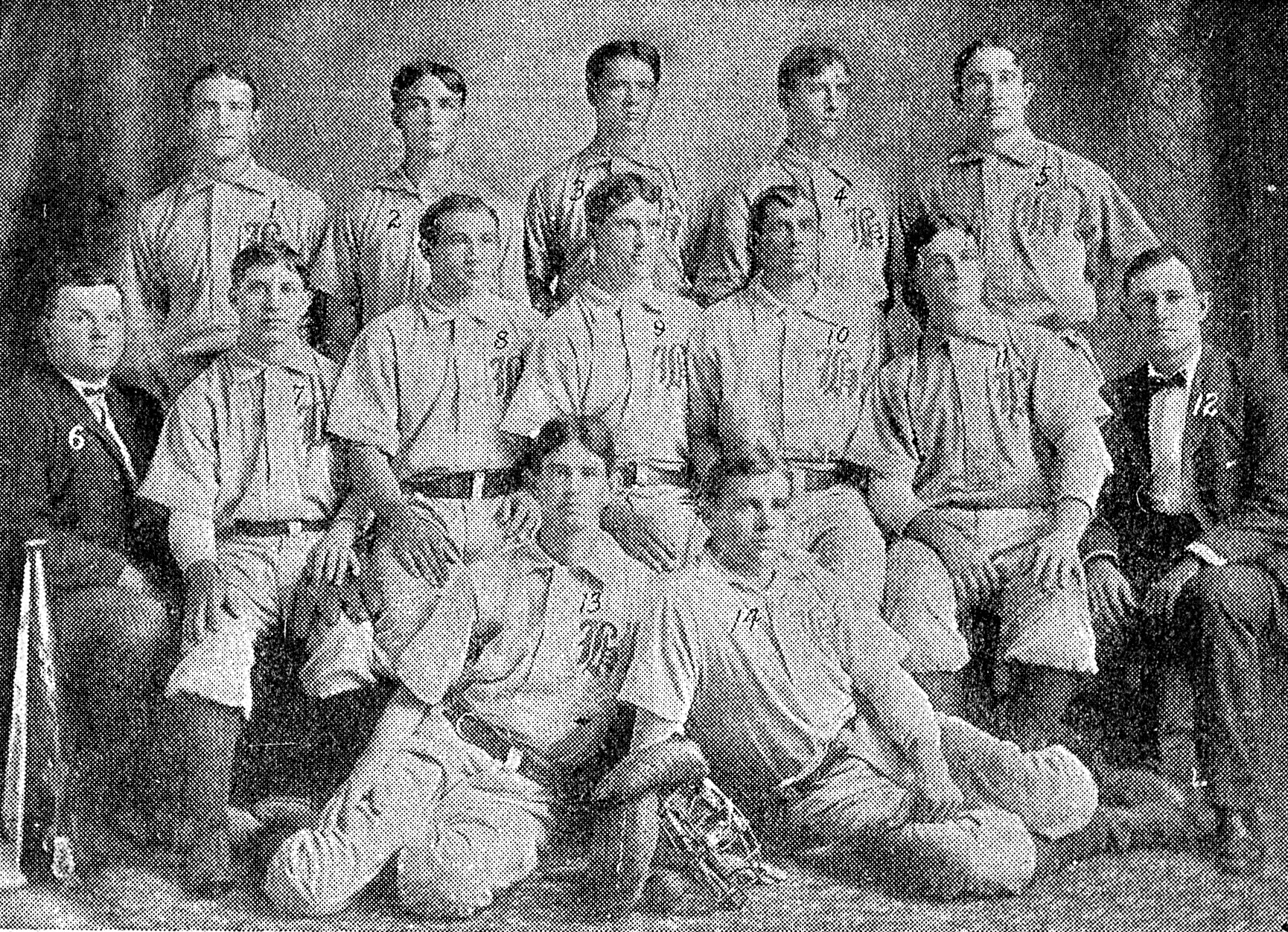
The 1905 Houston Marvels won the league title that season

1905 South Texas League

Team standings	W	L	PCT	GB	Managers
Houston Marvels	83	42	.664	–	Wade Moore
San Antonio Warriors	68	61	.527	17.0	Bill Morrow / Walter Morris / Piggy Page
Galveston Sand Crabs	57	69	.452	26.5	Piggy Page / Roy Akin / Charlie Moran /Con Lucid / Tony Smith / Dick Latham / Bill Kemmer / Brooks Gordon
Beaumont Oilers / Brenham Cotton Pickers/Orphans	45	81	.357	38.5	Tapper Longley / George Markley / Frank Everhart / Brooks Gordon / Trapper Longley

Beaumont (40–68) moved to Brenham (1–6) August 21; Brenham became an orphan team August 27 playing in Austin and San Antonio (4–7).

Player statistics
Player	Team	Stat	Tot	Player	Team	Stat	Tot
Earle Gardner	San Antonio	BA	.306	Ed Karger	Houston	W	24
Newt Hunter	Houston	Runs	79	Ivy Tevis	Galveston	SO	201
Newt Hunter	Houston	Hits	139	Ed Karger	Houston	Pct	.750; 24–8

1906 South Texas League

Team standings	W	L	PCT	GB	Managers
Houston Hands	78	43	.645	–	Con Harlow
Austin Senators	76	47	.618	3.0	Warren Gill
Beaumont Oilers	72	50	.590	6.5	Gerald Hayes / Sam LaRoque
Galveston Sand Crabs	58	68	.460	22.5	Wade Moore
San Antonio Bronchos	57	69	.452	23.5	Bill Alexander / Piggy Page / Ike Pendleton
Lake Charles Creoles	30	94	.242	49.5	Edward Switzer / Dick Latham

Playoff: Austin 4 games, Houston 4; Austin was awarded the championship after Houston refused to stop using non–league players. An additional game was played after Austin had been awarded the title by forfeit.

Player statistics
Player	Team	Stat	Tot	Player	Team	Stat	Tot
Sam LaRoque	Beaumont	BA	.294	Prince Gaskill	Houston	W	21
Joe Mowry	Houston	Runs	80	Red Nelson	Houston	Pct	.818; 18–4
Joe Mowry	Houston	Hits	144				
J. H. Cooper	Lake Charles	HR	5				
Joe Mellor	Beaumont	HR	5				

== Sources ==
The Encyclopedia of Minor League Baseball: Second Edition.
Image is user created not original.
