= Houston Buffaloes =

Houston Buffs
- 1888–1961; (1903, 1905, 1907–1942, 1946–1958, 1959–1961); Houston, Texas

Team logo	Cap insignia

Minor league affiliations
- Class: Triple-A (1959–1961); Class A (1921–1942), (1946–1958); Class B (1911–1920); Class C (1907–1910)
- League: American Association (1959–1961); Texas League (1888–1890), (1892), (1895–1899), (1907–1942), (1946–1958); South Texas League (1903–1906)

Major league affiliations
- Team: Chicago Cubs (1960–1961); St. Louis Cardinals (1920–1942), (1946–1958)

Minor league titles
- Dixie Series titles (4): 1928; 1947; 1956; 1957
- League titles (17): 1889; 1892; 1896; 1905; 1909; 1910; 1912; 1913; 1914; 1928; 1931; 1940; 1947; 1951; 1954; 1956; 1957
- First-half titles (6): 1892; 1904; 1905; 1906; 1928; 1931
- Second-half titles (3): 1892; 1905; 1931

Team data
- Name: Houston Buffs (1959–1961); Houston Buffaloes (1896–1899,1903), (1908–1942,1946-1958); Houston Mud Cats (1907); Houston Hands (1906); Houston Marvels (1905); Houston Lambs (1904); Houston Magnolias (1895); Houston Mud Cats (1889–1890,1892); Houston Babies (1888)
- Ballpark: Buffalo Stadium (aka Busch Stadium) (1928–1961); West End Park (1905–1927); Harrisburg Park (1904); Herald Park (aka League Park) (1888–1904)

The Houston Buffaloes, Houston Buffalos, or Buffs were an American minor league baseball team, and were the first minor league team to be affiliated with a Major League franchise, which was the St. Louis Cardinals. The club was founded in 1888, and played in the Texas League for the majority of its existence. From 1907 to 1958, they played at the Double-A level or its equivalent, two steps below the majors. They were owned by the Cardinals from 1920 to 1958. From 1959 through 1961, the team played in the Triple-A American Association as the top affiliate of the Chicago Cubs. The Buffaloes derived their nickname from Buffalo Bayou, the principal waterway through Houston to the Houston Ship Channel, outlet to the Gulf of Mexico. The team's last home was Buffalo Stadium, built in 1928. Before that, they played at West End Park from 1905–1928, and at Herald Park prior to that.

The Houston Buffaloes were purchased by the Houston Sports Association in 1961 to obtain the Houston metropolitan-area territorial rights for the new expansion team in Major League baseball and the National League, Houston Colt .45s (known since 1965 as the Houston Astros named after their futuristic enclosed indoor domed stadium, the Astrodome - the first of its kind in America). Several of those associated with the Buffaloes continued with the Colt .45s major league team including manager Harry Craft. The Buffaloes organization then ended their relationship with the Cubs, and became a Triple-A affiliate of the Colt. 45s. For the following 1962 season, they were reorganized and later moved north to become the Oklahoma City 89ers, which are known today as the Oklahoma City Comets. The 1931 and 1941 Buffaloes teams were recognized as being among the 100 greatest minor league teams of all time.

== History ==
=== Amateur predecessors (1861–1884) ===
On April 11, 1861, a baseball team in Houston was organized at a meeting held in the Palmer Building above J.H. Evans' dry goods store. The team was simply known as the "Houston Base Ball Club".

However, it is unknown if the Houston Base Ball Club played any games. The American Civil War began shortly thereafter, and there was a great lack of organized sports during this time.

Following the war, a newspaper article in The Daily Telegraph was published that detailed the first baseball game by a Houston team. The Houston Stonewalls defeated the Galveston Robert E. Lees at the site of the San Jacinto Battleground in what was dubbed as the Texas "State Championship" on April 21, 1868 (San Jacinto Day). The Stonewalls uniform was described as consisting of a red cap, white flannel shirt, and black pants.

In 1884, a league of primarily amateur teams was organized by Samuel L. Haine known as the "Texas League". The Houston Nationals represented the city along with Galveston, Dallas, Fort Worth, San Antonio, and Waco. Although 2–3 players per team were paid, most of the league players were strictly amateur.

=== The beginning (1887–1905) ===
Houston's first professional baseball club was officially organized by a large group of local leaders on December 31, 1887. Judge E. P. Hill served as president.

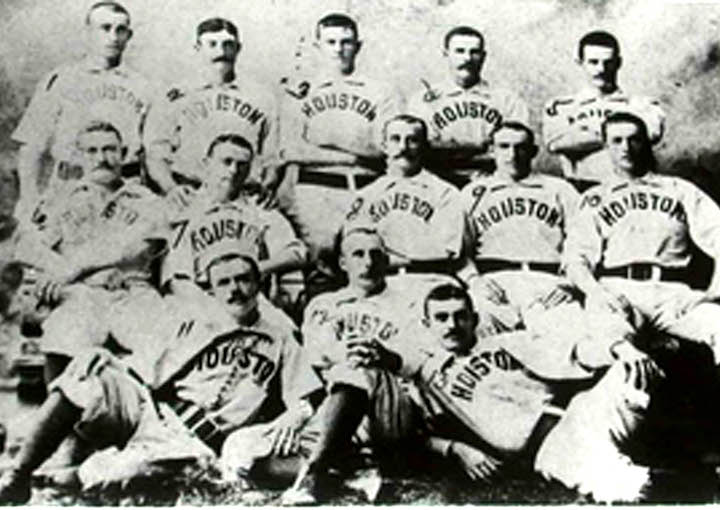
The 1889 Houston Mud Cats won the first Texas League pennant in Houston's history

The Houston Buffaloes began their first season in 1888 under the name "Houston Babies". The unusual name stemmed from the fact that they were the last to join the new Texas League. Uniform colors were described as "maroon and light blue" in a news article. The Houston Babies played their first game ever against the Cincinnati Red Stockings at Houston Base Ball Park on March 6, 1888 in exhibition play, where they lost by a score of 8–2. The first game of the Texas League was played between Houston and the Galveston Giants in Houston on April 1, 1888, in which the Babies proved to be victorious in a 4–1 score. This first season was financially difficult for the Texas League, and although the season was scheduled to last from April through mid-October 1888, Houston, along with every other team by this point, was forced to bow-out by early September.". On July 23, 1888, during mid-season, the team was completely reorganized at an evening meeting of stockholders at Houston City Hall. Robert Adair, who had served as financial secretary and Texas League president until this point, purchased the majority stake in the club for $1,000 USD which was effective the next day. Samuel Haine was then replaced as general manager by Pat Farrell.

The 1889 season was a productive one for Houston. Coming from San Antonio to the Magnolia City as manager of the team was John McCloskey. McCloskey had been the chief founder of the Texas League the year prior, and helped the club attain their first finish as champions of the league. Renamed as the "Mud Cats", Houston was still not without financial difficulty. Despite winning the Texas League in play, the Mud Cats were withheld the pennant until they paid their overdue membership fees for the season.

McCloskey remained with Houston for the next season, but in 1891, the Texas League did not play due to an inability to get financial backing. Without a league to play, Houston did not field a team. Despite McCloskey's return to Houston, a second title for the team, and a successful reorganization of the Texas League for 1892, the league remained unstable. The next two seasons it ceased to exist, and the club followed suit.

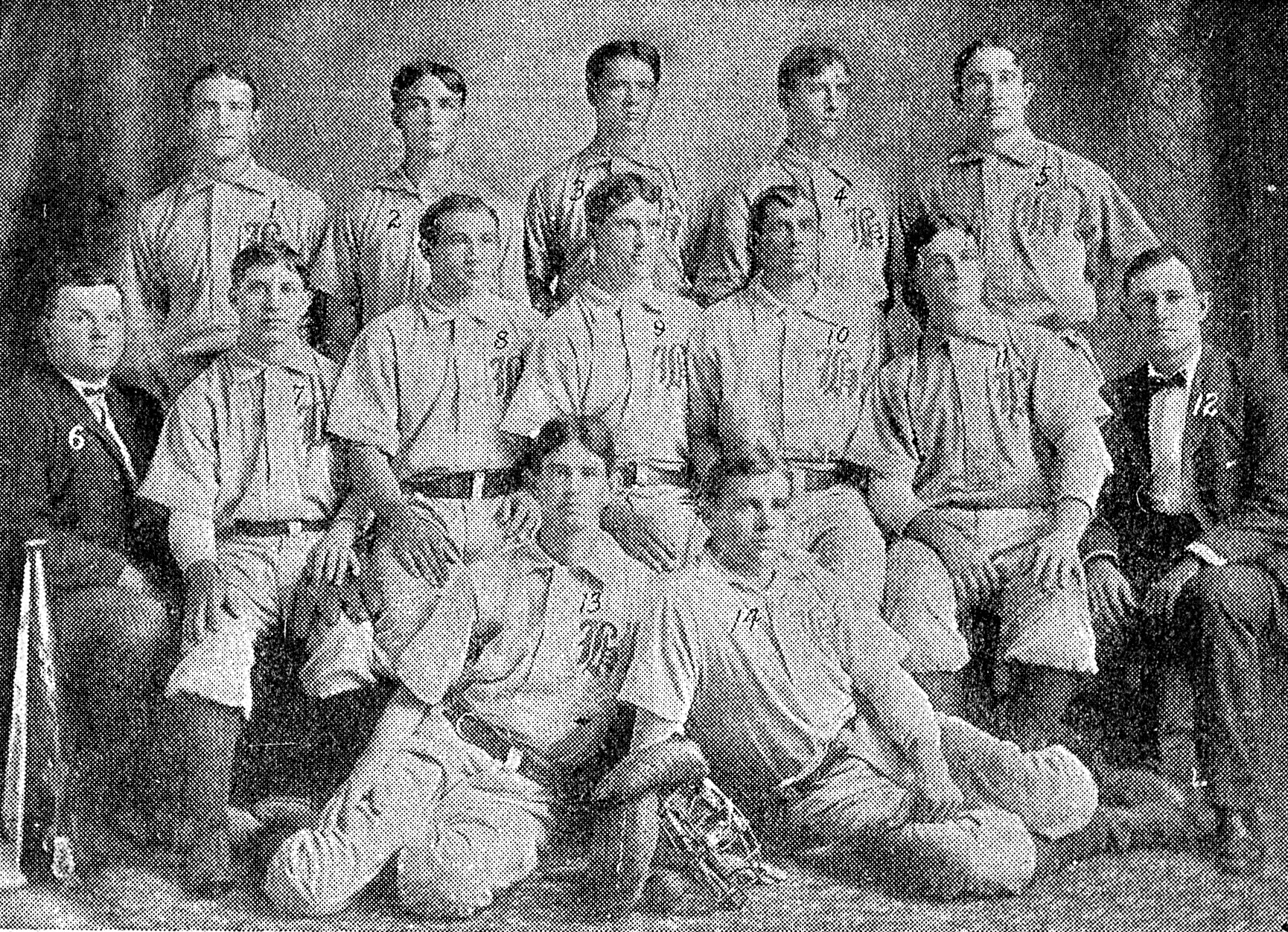
The 1905 Houston Buffaloes won the South Texas League title that season

The 1895 season saw the return of the Houston ball club. With McCloskey moving to manage his hometown Louisville Colonels of the National League, Houston promoted player Ollie Pickering to manage the team. Pickering was known for having hit the most singles in a single game in 1892, and originated the "Texas Leaguer" term. A pattern of continuously changing names persisted, and the 1895 Houston team named themselves the "Magnolias" after the nickname of the city. Following the season, a group of Houston businessmen consisting of President John Henry Kirby, Vice-President Si Packard, and Secretary/Treasurer Sam Taub, created the Houston Baseball Association, and took ownership of the team. With a history of financial instability in Houston's previous years, the Houston Baseball Association's purpose was to support and maintain the club.

The next season heralded more change for the team, as Pickering was called up to the big league by former manager McCloskey to play for the Louisville Colonels. The 1896 season was the first in which the club would be known by the name of the "Houston Buffaloes". First baseman Charlie "Jugger" Shaffer took over as manager, and the Buffaloes claimed their third league title.

From 1900 through 1902 Houston did not field a team, as the Texas League was again plagued by instability. However, in November 1902, new owner Claude Rielly revived the club when another league was formed for the next season. The club decided to continue as a member of the new rival to the Texas League known as the South Texas League along with Galveston, Beaumont, and San Antonio.

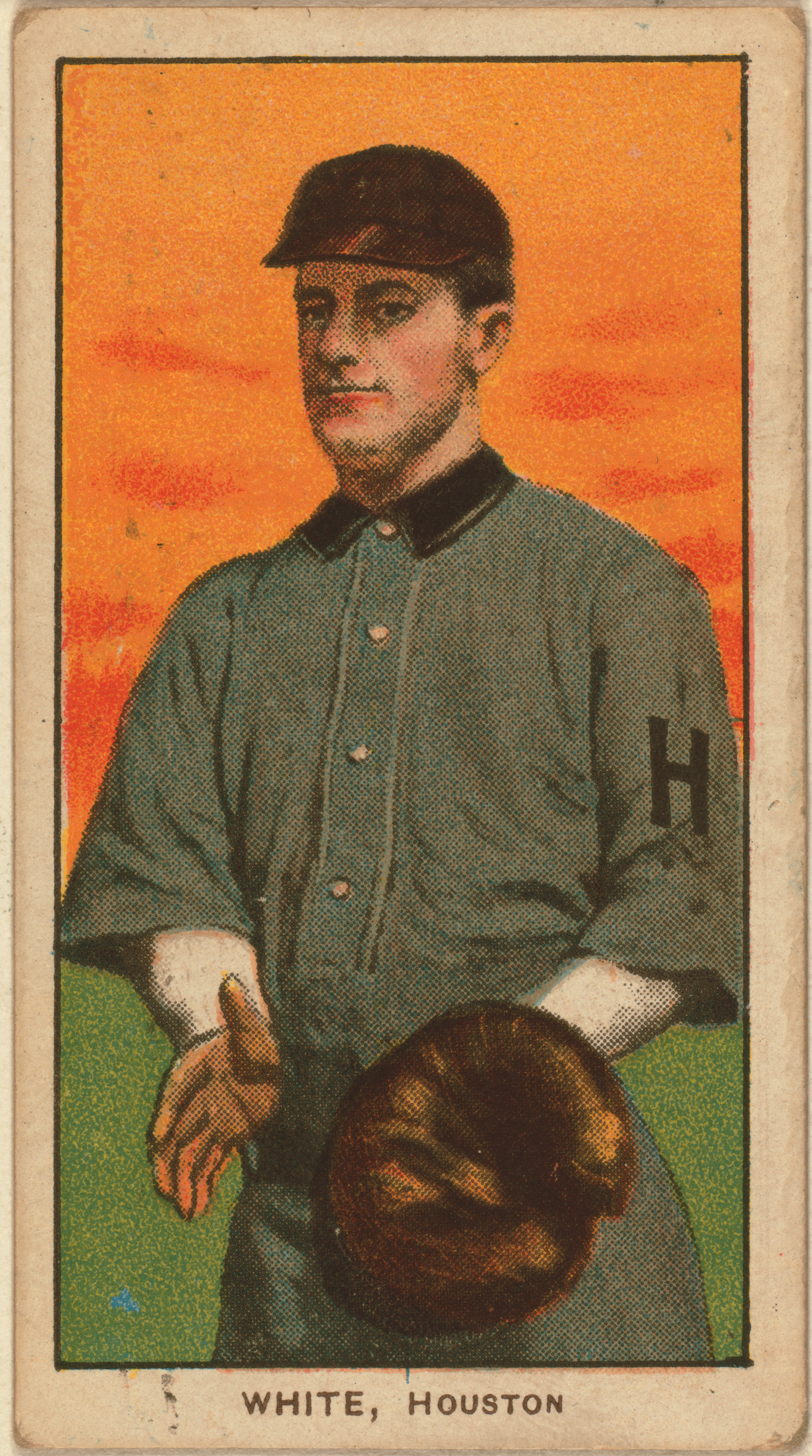
Foley White, catcher, 1909–1911

Finishing with a 3rd-place league record for the 1903 season, Houston hired Wade Moore during the 1904 season, who had led San Antonio to the league title as a manager prior. For this season, the club continued as the "Lambs". Although performing well for the beginning, the team discovered that their home stadium, the Houston Base Ball Park would be demolished in the middle of their season. Evicted by June 1904, the team was forced to move to an old horseracing track near Harrisburg Boulevard known as Harrisburg Park. At the time, the city's streetcars did not reach to this part of Houston, and fans were forced to ride the rest of the way in horse-drawn carts. With such a hassle for fans, attendance dropped dramatically, and the club was quickly losing money with rent to the racetrack. Instead of maintaining a home field in Houston, the team eventually opted to finish the rest of its season on the road, but Houston was ordered by league president Bliss Gorham to continue playing at home. Rielly complied, but by this time, the team became popularly known as the "Wanderers" in the local newspapers.

=== Stabilization and affiliation (1905–1928) ===
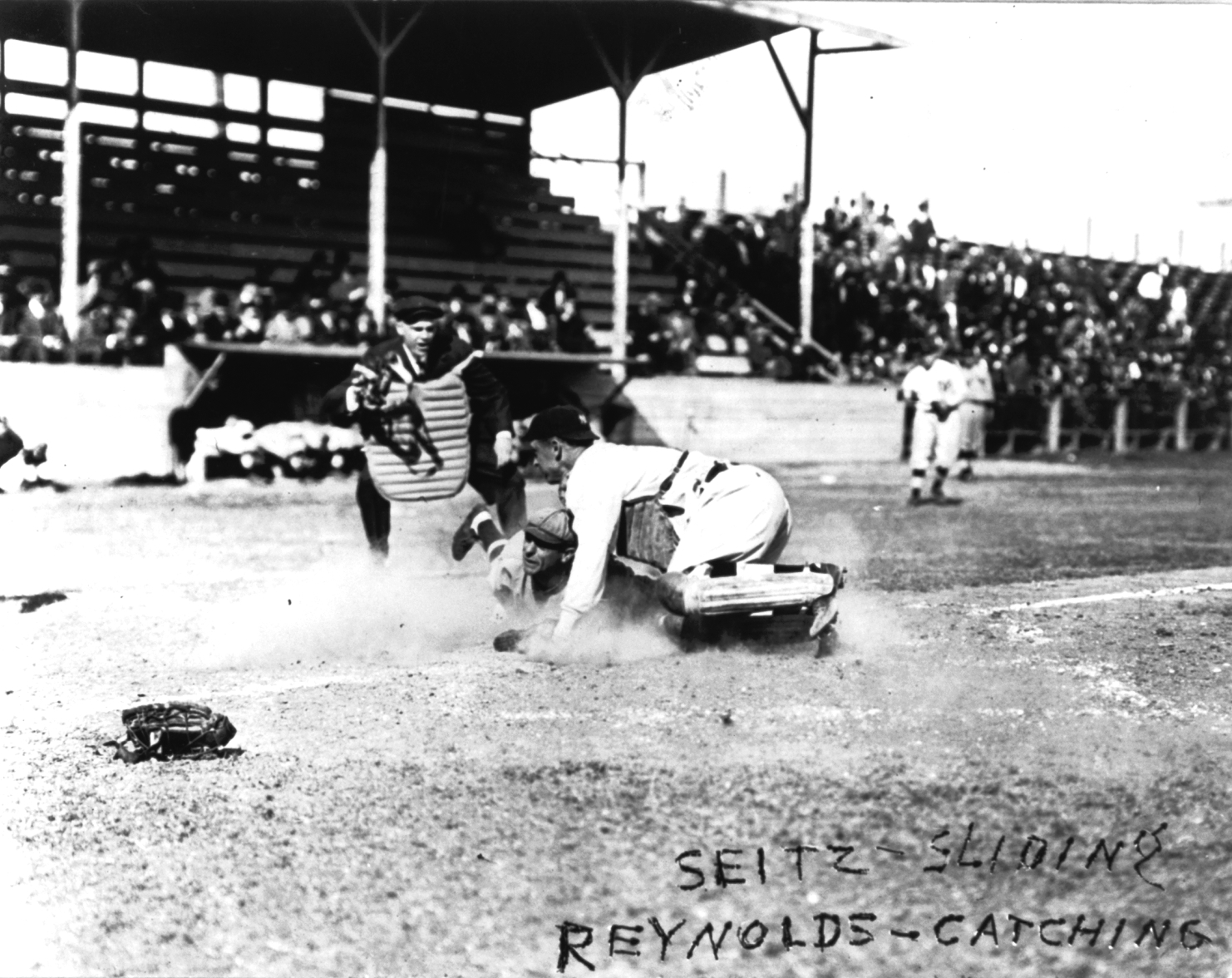
New York Yankees at Houston in West End Park during a spring training exhibition game in 1914

The 1905 season marked a point of stabilization for the franchise as reflected by the team's name, which remained as the "Houston Buffaloes" until their demise. A stark contrast from the previous season, the Buffaloes began playing in a brand new ballpark known as "West End Park". Under Wade Moore, the team took the 1905 South Texas League championship, which was their first since 1896.

On October 27, 1908, Claude Rielly officially sold the Houston Buffaloes to Otto Sens and J. Doak Roberts. With new ownership, veteran big leaguer Hunter Hill, who had played with the St. Louis Browns and Washington Senators, was hired as a first-year manager. The 1909 season started with an exhibition series between the Buffaloes and Hill's former team, the St. Louis Browns. Hill then led the team to two consecutive Texas League pennants for the 1909 and 1910 seasons. It was the first time that Houston claimed back-to-back championships in its history.

In 1919, the St. Louis Cardinals purchased an eighteen percent stake in the Houston Buffaloes, and in 1921 purchased a majority stake in the club. This made Houston the first affiliated minor league baseball club. From 1921–58, the Buffaloes were an important farm team of the Cardinals, ranking two rungs below the majors (Class A from 1921 to 1935, then A1 from 1935 to 1942, and finally AA from 1946 onward). During that period, star players such as brothers Dizzy Dean and Paul Dean, Solly Hemus, Vinegar Bend Mizell, Hal Epps, Don Gutteridge, Al Papai, Joe Medwick, Frank O. Mancuso, Harry Brecheen and Howie Pollet prepped in Houston on their way to the major leagues.

The 1928 campaign was another landmark season for the ball club. With stars like on the roster like Red Worthington, Carey Selph, George Watkins, Ray Powell, Bubber Jonnard, Heinie Schuble, Tex Carleton, and Frank Snyder, the Houston Buffaloes took the Texas League championship that year. Pitcher Bill Hallahan led the league in strikeouts that season with a 2.25 ERA. They then progressed to their first ever interleague Dixie Series against the Southern Association champions, the Birmingham Barons, where they won that series as well.

=== Later history and succession (1928–1961) ===
West End Park was sold to the Houston Independent School District in 1928, and the Buffaloes moved into a brand new Buffalo Stadium on the opposite end of town.

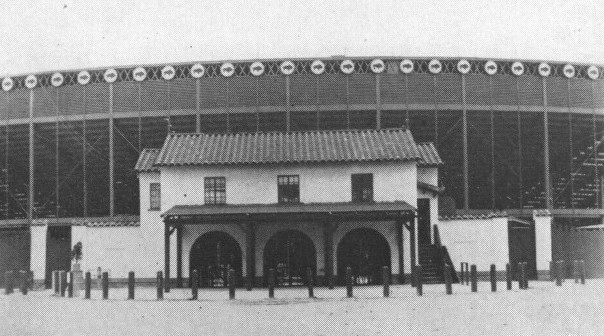
Buffalo Stadium, the longest-serving and final ballpark of the Houston Buffaloes from 1928 through 1961

The Buffaloes and Buffalo Stadium were depicted in the 1952 film The Pride of St. Louis detailing Hall of Fame pitcher Dizzy Dean's minor league career with the Houston team. In the 1931 season, led by former Cardinals outfielder Joe Schultz, Sr., the Buffaloes' had 108 regular-season victories (in 159 games) and won the Texas League championship. The Buffaloes' most notable period came between 1939–41, when, as a Cardinal farm managed by Eddie Dyer and laden with talent, they won three straight Texas League pennants, winning 97, 105 and 103 regular-season games in the process.

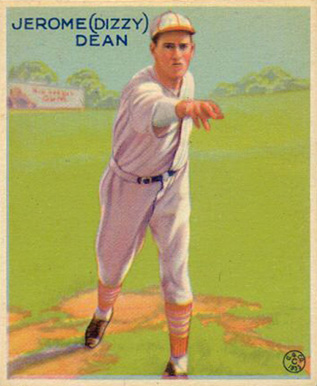
Hall of famer pitcher Dizzy Dean was scouted by Houston and helped the 1931 team win the Texas League pennant

In addition to the Texas League championship pennants, the Buffaloes also won the Dixie Series against the Southern Association champions in 1928 (4–2 over the Birmingham Barons), 1947 (4–2 over the Mobile Bears), 1956 (4–2 over the Atlanta Crackers), and 1957 (4–2 over the Atlanta Crackers).

From 1950 until the Buffs' final outing in 1961, veteran radio broadcaster Loel Passe was the "Voice of the Buffs". During the 1959 season, a young television reporter with ABC affiliate KTRK-TV, Dan Rather, sat in with Passe as the play-by-play announcer for the Buffs' radio broadcast. Then in the final season of the Houston Buffaloes, Passe was joined in the booth by Ford Frick Award winner Gene Elston who went on to lead the broadcast for the Colt .45s and Houston Astros from 1962 to 1986.

Logo for the Houston Buffaloes during the 1950s

In 1959, the Buffs severed ties with the Cardinals to move up to the Triple-A level, and then began an affiliation with the Chicago Cubs. At the same time, the City of Houston, through a group of local business leaders known as the "Houston Sports Association", was selected as one of the eight members of a planned "third major league", the Continental League, but plans eventually fell through after team owner Marty Marion could not come to an agreement to sell the team. The Continental League as a whole folded in August 1960, and Marion sold the team to a group led by William Hopkins on August 16, 1960. However, on October 17, 1960, the National League granted an expansion franchise to the Houston Sports Association in which their team could begin play in the 1962 season. According to the Major League Baseball Constitution, the Houston Sports Association was required to obtain territorial rights from the Buffs before beginning play. Under the rules of the time, the owner of a minor league team owned the major league rights to a city. Again negotiations began to purchase the team. Eventually, the Houston Sports Association purchased the Houston Buffaloes from William Hopkins on January 17, 1961. The purchase price for the team was $393,000 USD. Additionally, the HSA was forced to pay US$200,000 to the American Association because of their removal from the league. The Buffs played one last minor league season as the top farm team of the Chicago Cubs in 1961 before being succeeded by the city's NL club, the Colt .45s (known since 1965 as the Houston Astros).

The final logo for the Houston Buffs which was in use from 1959 through 1961. Despite its yellow and brown color scheme, it was not reflective of the team colors, which were instead red and blue.

Many of those associated with the Houston Buffaloes organization were allowed by the ownership to continue in the major league. Manager Harry Craft, who had joined Houston in 1961, remained in the same position for the team until the end of the 1964 season. General manager Spec Richardson also continued with the organization as business manager, but was later promoted again to the same position with the Astros from 1967 until 1975. Although most players for the major league franchise were obtained through the 1961 Major League Baseball expansion draft, Buffs players J.C. Hartman, Pidge Browne, Jim Campbell, Ron Davis, Dave Giusti, and Dave Roberts were chosen to continue as major league ball players at some point throughout the 1962 season. In 1963, Aaron Pointer was promoted as well.

Similarly, the radio broadcasting team remained with the new Houston major league franchise. Loel Passe worked alongside Gene Elston as a color commentator until he retired from broadcasting in 1976. Elston continued with the Astros until 1986.

After being purchased by Houston's major league club, the Buffaloes organization served as their Triple-A affiliate, but were reorganized and moved to become the Oklahoma City 89ers, which have been known since 2024 as the Oklahoma City Comets. Eventually, the Astros sold the team to Tulsa businessman, P. C. Dixon, in November 1970. However, Oklahoma City remained affiliated with the Astros through the 1972 season. Beginning in the 2011 season, the Oklahoma City club again became the Astros' Triple-A affiliate, but that affiliation ended three years later.

== Hall of Fame ==
The Houston Buffaloes had many associated with them who were inducted into or honored by the National Baseball Hall of Fame including Dizzy Dean who played for the team from 1930–1931, "Ducky" Joe Medwick who played from 1931–1932, Chick Hafey who played for 1924, Jim Bottomley who played for 1921, and Tris Speaker who played for 1907. Commentator Gene Elston, who worked with the Buffaloes in 1961, was awarded the Ford C. Frick Award in 2006.

== Other league affiliations ==
=== Major League affiliations ===
Prior to 1919, it was not a practice of Minor League teams to be affiliated with Major League clubs. In 1959, Houston became independent of any Major League club, but became affiliates of the Chicago Cubs for their last two seasons.

Seasons	Team	League
1919–1958	St. Louis Cardinals	National League
1960–1961	Chicago Cubs	National League

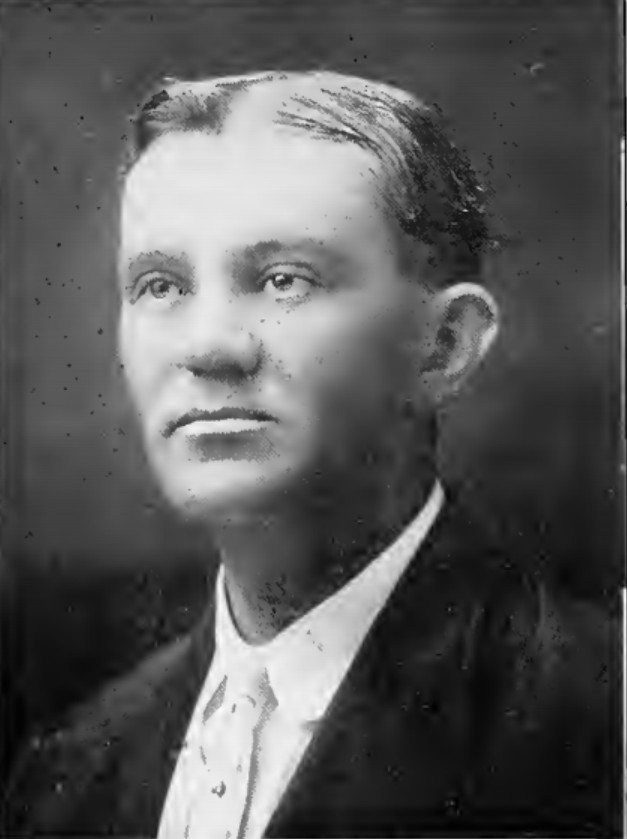
Otto Sens, co-owner of the Houston Buffaloes from 1908 until 1920

=== Minor League affiliations ===
It was common at one time for higher level minor league teams to have lower level minor league affiliates.

Level	Seasons	Team	Location	League
C	1951	Enid Buffaloes	Enid, Oklahoma	Western Association

== Ownership and executives ==
=== Majority owners ===
- Robert Adair, 1888
- Houston Baseball Association, 1895–1899
- Claude Rielly, 1902–1908
- Otto Sens and J. Doak Roberts, 1908–1920
- John H. Crooker, 1920–1922
- H.L. "Robby" Robertson, 1922–1925
- Sam Breadon, 1925–1947
- Anheuser-Busch, 1948–1959
- Marty Marion, 1959–1960
- William Hopkins, 1960–1961
- Houston Sports Association, 1961
