= Texas League =

American sports league in minor league baseball

- Upcoming season or competition: 2026 Texas League season
- Classification: Double-A (1946–present); Class A1 (1936–1942); Class A (1921–1935); Class B (1911–1920); Class C (1904–1905, 1907–1910); Class D (1902–1903, 1906)
- Sport: Baseball
- Founded: 1902 (124 years ago)
- No. of teams: 10
- Country: United States
- Most recent champion: Amarillo Sod Poodles (2026)
- Most titles: Houston Buffaloes (16)
- Website: www.milb.com/texas

The Texas League is a Minor League Baseball league which has operated in the South Central United States since 1902. It is classified as a Double-A league. Despite the league's name, only its five South Division teams are actually based in the state of Texas; the five North Division teams are located in Arkansas, Kansas, Missouri, and Oklahoma. The league temporarily operated for the 2021 season as Double-A Central before reassuming its original moniker in 2022.

The Texas League was founded in 1902, although it traces its lineage back to a predecessor founded in 1888.

== History ==
=== 20th century ===
The league was founded in 1888 and ran through 1892. It was refounded in 1895 and ran through 1899 (under the name Texas Association in 1895 and Texas-Southern League in 1896).

The Texas League was revived as a Class D league in 1902, moved to Class C in 1904 where it played through 1910 (except for 1906 as Class D again), played at Class B until 1920, and finally moved up to Class A in 1921. It became a Class A1 league in 1936 and has been at Double-A since 1946. For most of the time since 1904, it has been two steps below the majors.

The Texas League, like many others, shut down during World War II. From 1959 to 1961, the Texas League and the Mexican League formed the Pan American Association. The two leagues played a limited interlocking schedule and post-season championship. By 1971, the Texas League and the Southern League had both decreased to seven teams. They played an interlocking schedule with the Southern League known as the Dixie Association. The two leagues played separate playoffs. The Texas League resumed its own schedule in 1972.

The term "Texas Leaguer" to describe a bloop hit, a soft fly ball that falls for a hit beyond the infielders' reach but too short for the outfielders to catch, has been extant since at least 1903 and was common throughout American baseball in the 20th century and to some degree into the 21st. The source of the idiom is not known but among other theories has been attributed to Ollie Pickering's feat in a Texas League game of May 21, 1892, in which he made seven such hits in succession. Talk of this singular feat is supposed to have spread widely, bringing the term with it.

=== 21st century ===
Around the advent of the 21st century, the Texas League witnessed a great deal of change. Teams once known as the Jackson Mets, El Paso Diablos, Shreveport Captains, and Wichita Wranglers all relocated to new cities and bigger stadiums.

In 2019, the San Antonio Missions relocated to Amarillo, Texas, becoming the Amarillo Sod Poodles. At the same time, the Triple-A Colorado Springs Sky Sox of the Pacific Coast League (PCL) moved to San Antonio to continue on as the Missions at the Triple-A level.

The start of the 2020 season was postponed due to the COVID-19 pandemic before ultimately being cancelled on June 30. As part of Major League Baseball's 2021 reorganization of the minor leagues, the Texas League was temporarily renamed to "Double-A Central" for the 2021 season. Following MLB's acquisition of the rights to the names of the historical minor leagues, the league switched back to its historical name beginning with the 2022 season.

== Current teams ==
Division	Team	MLB affiliation	City	Stadium	Capacity
North	Arkansas Travelers	Seattle Mariners	North Little Rock, Arkansas	Dickey–Stephens Park	7,200
North	Northwest Arkansas Naturals	Kansas City Royals	Springdale, Arkansas	Arvest Ballpark	7,305
North	Ozarks Springbirds	St. Louis Cardinals	Springfield, Missouri	Route 66 Stadium	10,486
North	Tulsa Drillers	Los Angeles Dodgers	Tulsa, Oklahoma	ONEOK Field	7,833
North	Wichita Turbo Tubs	Minnesota Twins	Wichita, Kansas	Equity Bank Park	12,000
South	Amarillo Sod Poodles	Arizona Diamondbacks	Amarillo, Texas	Hodgetown	6,631
South	Corpus Christi Hooks	Houston Astros	Corpus Christi, Texas	Whataburger Field	7,679
South	Frisco RoughRiders	Texas Rangers	Frisco, Texas	Riders Field	10,316
South	Midland RockHounds	Athletics	Midland, Texas	Momentum Bank Ballpark	6,669
South	San Antonio Missions	San Diego Padres	San Antonio, Texas	Nelson W. Wolff Municipal Stadium	9,200

North Division, South Division

== Texas League timeline ==
League members Dixie Association PCL Other League

- In 1971, the Southern League and Texas League were each down to seven teams, so they formed the Dixie Association for one season. They played interlocking schedules but held their own separate playoffs.
- The Wichita Wind Surge were originally slated to begin play in 2020 in the Pacific Coast League as the Triple-A affiliate of the Miami Marlins. However, the cancellation of the 2020 season and the 2021 realignment of the minor leagues resulted in Wichita dropping to Double-A without playing a Triple-A game.

== Complete list of Texas League teams (1902–present) ==
Note: • An "^" indicates that team's article redirects to an article of an active team in a different league

- Albuquerque Dodgers
- Albuquerque Dukes
- Alexandria Aces
- Amarillo Giants
- Amarillo Gold Sox
- Amarillo Sonics
- Amarillo Sod Poodles
- Ardmore Rosebuds
- Ardmore Territorians
- Arkansas Travelers
- Austin Braves
- Austin Senators
- Beaumont Exporters
- Beaumont Golden Gators
- Beaumont Oilers
- Beaumont Roughnecks
- Cleburne Railroaders
- Corpus Christi Giants
- Corpus Christi Hooks
- Corsicana Oil Citys
- Corsicana Oilers
- Dallas Eagles
- Dallas Giants
- Dallas Griffins
- Dallas Marines
- Dallas Rangers
- Dallas Rebels
- Dallas Steers
- Dallas Submarines
- Dallas-Fort Worth Spurs
- El Paso Diablos
- El Paso Sun Dodgers
- El Paso Sun Kings
- Fort Worth Cats
- Fort Worth Panthers
- Frisco RoughRiders
- Galveston Buccaneers
- Galveston Pirates
- Galveston Sand Crabs
- Greenville Hunters
- Houston Buffaloes
- Houston Mud Cats
- Jackson Generals
- Jackson Mets
- Lafayette Drillers
- Longview Cannibals
- Memphis Blues
- Midland Angels
- Midland Cubs
- Midland RockHounds
- Northwest Arkansas Naturals
- Oklahoma City Indians
- Oklahoma City Mets
- Ozarks Springbirds
- Paris Eisenfelder's Homeseekers
- Paris Parisites
- Paris Red Ravens
- Paris Steers
- Rio Grande Valley Giants
- Round Rock Express^
- San Antonio Aces
- San Antonio Bears
- San Antonio Brewers
- San Antonio Bronchos
- San Antonio Bullets
- San Antonio Dodgers
- San Antonio Indians
- San Antonio Missions
- Sherman-Denison Students
- Shreveport Braves
- Shreveport Captains
- Shreveport Gassers
- Shreveport Pirates
- Shreveport Sports
- Shreveport Swamp Dragons
- Springfield Cardinals
- Temple Boll Weevils
- Texarkana Casket Makers
- Tulsa Drillers
- Tulsa Oilers
- Tyler Sports
- Victoria Giants
- Victoria Rosebuds
- Victoria Toros
- Waco Cubs
- Waco Navigators
- Waco Steers
- Waco Tigers
- Wichita Falls Spudders
- Wichita Pilots
- Wichita Turbo Tubs
- Wichita Wind Surge
- Wichita Wranglers

== See also ==
- List of Texas League stadiums
