= Sports in San Antonio =

Overview of San Antonio, Texas, US

Sports in San Antonio includes a number of professional major and minor league sports teams. The American city of San Antonio, Texas, also has college, high school, and other amateur or semi-pro sports teams.

The city's only major professional league sports team, and consequently the team most San Antonians follow, is the San Antonio Spurs of the National Basketball Association. The Spurs have been playing in San Antonio since 1973 and have won five NBA Championships (1999, 2003, 2005, 2007, and 2014). Previously, the Spurs played at the Alamodome, which was built for football, and before that the HemisFair Arena, but the Spurs built – with public money – and moved into the SBC Center in 2002, since renamed the AT&T Center following the merger of SBC and AT&T. It was later renamed to the Frost Bank Center after Frost Bank became the arena sponsor.

San Antonio is home to the Double-A Minor League affiliate of the San Diego Padres, the San Antonio Missions who play at Nelson Wolff Stadium on the west side of the city.

The University of Texas at San Antonio and the University of the Incarnate Word fields San Antonio's two D1 college athletic teams.

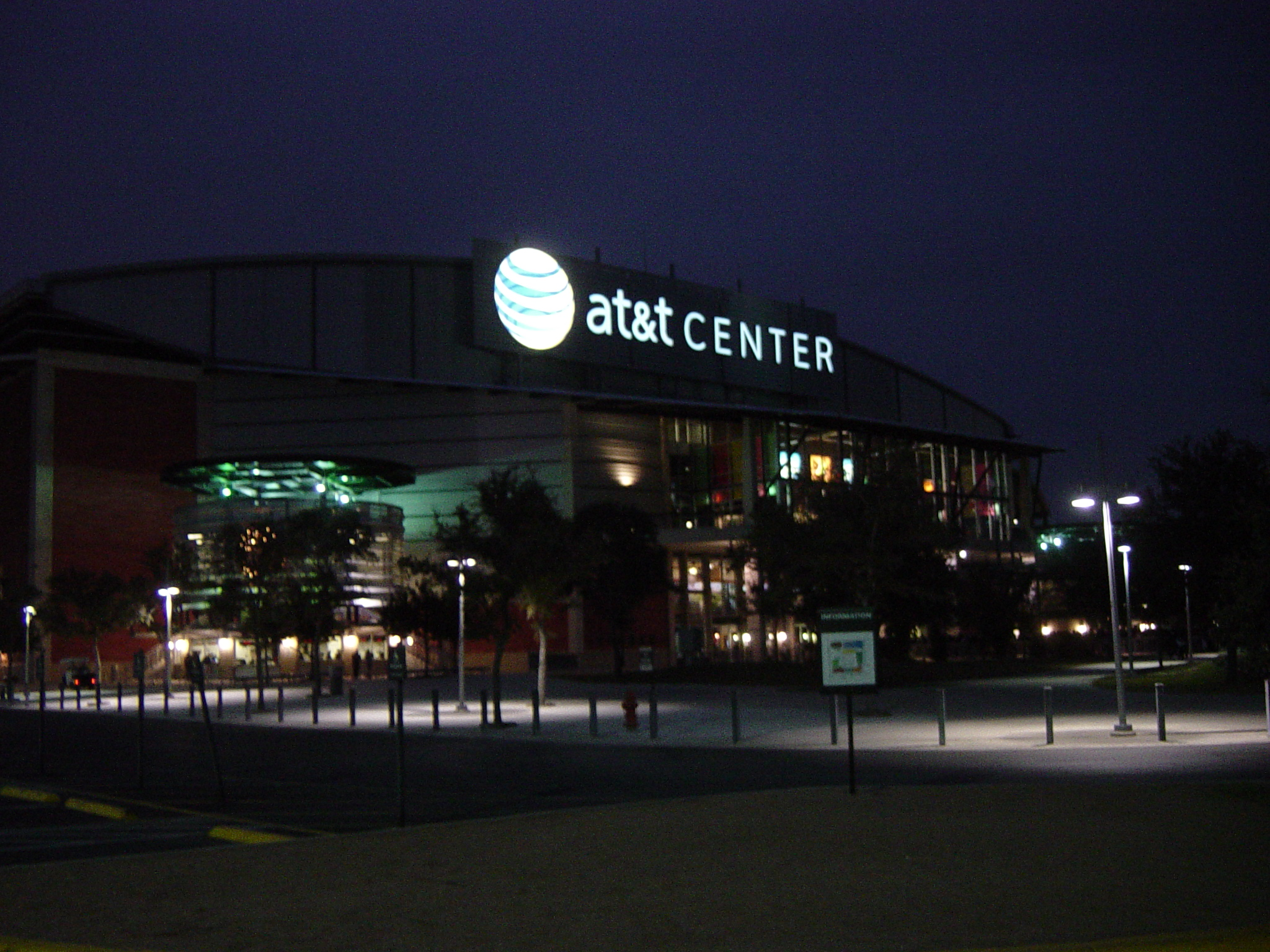
The Frost Bank Center (Pictured as AT&T Center) is home to the NBA's San Antonio Spurs.

== Professional sports ==
San Antonio is home to one major league professional sports team: the National Basketball Association's San Antonio Spurs. San Antonio is also home to minor league professional sports teams in soccer, baseball, and basketball.

San Antonio is also occasionally home to international professional sports events. The April 15, 2014 soccer match at the Alamodome between the United States and Mexico sold a record 65,000 tickets, with tickets sold out over two months in advance. This beat the city's previous record for a soccer match of 54,313, set in January 2014 for a friendly between Mexico and South Korea.

Sport	League	Club	Founded	Venue	Titles	Championship years
Basketball	NBA	San Antonio Spurs	1967	Frost Bank Center	5	1998-99, 2002–03, 2004–05, 2006–07, 2013–14
Baseball	TL(AA)	San Antonio Missions *	1888	Nelson W. Wolff Municipal Stadium	14	1897, 1903, 1908, 1933, 1950, 1961, 1963, 1964, 1997, 2002, 2003, 2007, 2011, & 2013
Soccer	USLC	San Antonio FC	2016	Toyota Field	1	2022
Arena Football	IFL	San Antonio Gunslingers	2020	Freeman Coliseum	0	N/A
Football	CoFL	San Antonio Toros	2025	TBD	0	n.a.
Dodgeball	NDL	Texas Shade	2004		0	None
Soccer	USL2	San Antonio FC	2026	Rico's STAR Soccer Complex	0	None
Soccer	USLW	Lonestar San Antonio	2024	Gayle and Tom Benson Stadium	0	None

Notes:

- The Spurs were formerly the Dallas Chaparrals (1967-1970, 1971-1973), formerly the Texas Chaparrals (1970-1971)
- The San Antonio Missions were an AA Team in the Texas League and moved to Amarillo in 2018 to become the Amarillo Sod Poodles, at which time San Antonio was selected for a AAA team, which maintained the same name, later being brought back down to a AA team.
- The Missions were founded in 1888; however, they have played under multiple leagues and names.

== Current semi-professional teams ==
Current semi-professional teams in San Antonio.

Sport	League	Club	Founded	Venue	Titles
Basketball	American Basketball Association	Texas Red Wolves	2015	Champion Sportsplex	0
Rugby	Texas Rugby Union division 3	Alamo City Rugby Football Club	1983	Bowie Field in Brooks Park	0
Rugby	Texas Rugby Union division 3	San Antonio Rugby Football Club	1971	Olmos Basin Park Pitch	0
Soccer	United Premier Soccer League	Samba FC San Antonio	2017	Wheatley Heights Soccer Complex	0
Quadball	Major League Quadball	San Antonio Soldados	2019		1

== National and international events ==
- NCAA football bowl game Alamo Bowl each December
- U.S. Olympic Festival in 1993
- NCAA Final four host - men's tournament: 1998, 2004, 2008, 2018, and 2025
- NCAA Final four host - women's tournament: 2002, 2010, and 2029
- NBA All-Star Game: 1996
- NABC All-Star Game: 1998

== NCAA college football ==
Team	Division	Conference	Founded	Venue
UTSA Roadrunners	Division I	Conference USA	2011	Alamodome (65,000)
Incarnate Word Cardinals	Division I	Southland Conference	2009	Gayle and Tom Benson Stadium (6,000)
Trinity Tigers	Division III	Southern	1900	Trinity University Stadium (3,500)

== NCAA college basketball ==
Team	Division	Conference	Founded	Venue (capacity)	NCAA tournament appearances	Year
UTSA Roadrunners	Division I	Conference USA	1981	Convocation Center (4,080)	4	1988, 1999, 2004, 2011
Incarnate Word Cardinals	Division I	Southland	1989	McDermott Center	3 (Division II)	2002, 2009, 2010
St. Mary's Rattlers	Division II	Heartland*	1926	Bill Greehey Arena	8	1989**, 2001, 2003, 2005, 2008, 2012, 2013, 2015
Trinity Tigers	Division III	SCAC	1930	Sams Gymnasium (1,800)	10	***

* Beginning in 2019, the St. Mary's Rattlers will be in the Lone Star Conference.

** The St. Mary's Rattlers won the NAIA national title in 1989.

*** The Trinity Tigers appeared in the post-season tournament in 1998, 2000, 2003, 2004, 2005, 2006, 2009, 2012, 2013, and 2014.

== Marathon ==
Current

- Christmas Jingle Rudolph Run

Events include: 5K run, 10K run, 13.1 run, and Family Fun 1 Mile run.

- SATX Marathon

Events include: Full marathon, Half marathon, and 5K runs
Event started in 2025 as a replacement to, "Rock 'n' Roll Marathon"
https://sanantoniomarathon.com/

- Alamo Marathon aka Run the Alamo

Events include: Full marathon and Half marathon
Separate events: Donut dash: 5K and 10K
Years: 2012-current
https://www.runthealamo.com/

Prior

- Rock 'n' Roll Marathon

The San Antonio Rock 'n' Roll Marathon started in 2007 and is part of the nationwide Rock 'n' Roll Marathon series.
Events included: Full marathon, Half marathon, 10K run, 5K run, 13.1 relay, and Kids rock run.
The events ran from 2008-2024.

- Marathon of the Americas

Events include: Full marathon and Half marathon
Separate events: 5K Mayor’s Challenge and 5K Fitness Run
Years: 2000-2007

- Las Colonias de San Antonio

Years: 1975-2000

== Motorsports ==
Alamo City Motorplex (formerly known as San Antonio Raceway) is a 1/4 mile drag strip with a 1/2 mile of shutdown space. It has a seating capacity of 13,000. The facility is an NHRA Member Track and also hosts a number of large yearly events including Bounty Hunters No-Prep, Midnight Grudge Fest, Club Loose Drifting, Summit Series Bracket Racing, and weekly test and tune sessions.

Closed late 2019.

== High school ==
San Antonio is home of the U.S. Army All-American Bowl, played annually in the Alamodome and televised live on NBC. The Bowl is an East versus West showdown featuring the nation's top 90 high school senior football players. The game has featured NFL stars Reggie Bush, Vince Young, Adrian Peterson, and many other college and NFL stars. The U.S. Army All-American Bowl also includes the U.S. Army All-American Marching Band, the U.S. Army National Combine, and the U.S. Army Coaches Academy, all of which take place in San Antonio during the week leading up to the game itself.

The U.S. Army All-American Marching Band features 91 of the nation's top high school senior marching musicians who perform during halftime of the U.S. Army All-American Bowl. The U.S. Army National Combine features 500 of the nation's top high school underclassman football players. The U.S. Army Coaches Academy features 100 of the nation's top high school football coaches, including the coaches of each U.S. Army All-American.

== Club teams ==
San Antonio is also home to the San Antonio Gaelic Athletic Club, which was established in early 2011. The SAGAC plays in a Texas League with teams from Austin, Dallas, and Houston. The season ranges from April to the end of August, when the team competes at the North American Gaelic Athletic Association tournament every Labor Day Weekend. The club also has two inter-squad teams, the San Patricios and the I.C.A (Irish Citizen Army), that compete in a pub league in the fall.

Additionally, there is a UTSA (University of Texas at San Antonio) Club Hockey team (ACHA D2). Roadrunner hockey was initially created in 2007 and lasted all the way up until 2013, when the team was abandoned due to financial issues, and until fall 2023, UTSA was without a hockey club. That was until two friends, club president Noah Dow and Joshua LeComte, came together to create the team. UTSA hockey was DII Independent for the first two years, but now will be joining the TCHC for the 2026-2027 Season.

== History ==
The city served as a temporary home for the New Orleans Saints for the 2005 NFL season due to the effects of Hurricane Katrina. The Saints set up practice facilities in San Antonio for the season, and played a split home schedule between the Alamodome and Baton Rouge, Louisiana's Tiger Stadium during the 2005 season. After the final game in San Antonio, the Saints committed to moving back to New Orleans for the 2006 season. City officials are said to be attempting to lure the National Football League permanently to San Antonio and have also said that a strong showing at the Alamodome for the three local Saints games was vital to showing that San Antonio can support an NFL franchise. NFL Commissioner Paul Tagliabue said that San Antonio was successful in hosting the team, and that the city would be on the short list for any future NFL expansions. The city has also hosted the Dallas Cowboys' and Houston Oilers' preseason camps in the past, and they signed a contract with the Cowboys in which the Cowboys practiced in San Antonio through 2011. Cowboys owner Jerry Jones has acknowledged his support for the city's efforts to become home to an NFL franchise. Although it is the largest city in the United States without an NFL team, San Antonio's smaller metropolitan population has so far contributed to its lack of landing an NFL, MLB, or NHL team.

San Antonio has fielded teams in two attempted major league football rivals to the NFL, both at Alamo Stadium: in 1975, the Florida Blazers of the World Football League relocated to San Antonio as the Wings for one season before the league ceased operations; and in 1984, the San Antonio Gunslingers joined the United States Football League as an expansion team and played for two seasons before the league folded. The San Antonio Riders were one of the founding teams of the World League of American Football, the NFL's one-time spring developmental league, in 1991. They played for two seasons before the North American teams were disbanded and the WLAF became a strictly European league. During the Canadian Football League's brief expansion into the U.S., the city played host to the San Antonio Texans for a single season in 1995, following the team's relocation from Sacramento after two seasons. San Antonio was also home to two minor league football franchises: the Toros of the Texas Football League (later Continental Football League, then Trans-American Football League) from 1966-1971; and the Charros of the American Football Association from 1978-1981. After the 2011 Arena Football League season, the Tulsa Talons relocated from Oklahoma and played two seasons in San Antonio before folding in 2014.

In 2001, San Antonio bid to host the 2007 Pan American Games but lost to Rio de Janeiro.

In March 2006, the city made an offer to build a stadium for the struggling Florida Marlins baseball franchise. However, the Marlins and Major League Baseball declined the offer.

In 2005, the city approached Major League Soccer with an interest in placing a soccer franchise in the vacant Alamodome. Both the city and the league seemed to be in harmony, with the council voting 9-2 in favor of the new San Antonio team, citing that it would reduce the financial burden of the stadium on the city by providing it with a permanent tenant without extra financial costs as the necessary upgrading of facilities at the dome would have to take place regardless of a team moving in or not. The following week an 8-3 vote carried the second part of the plan, which would see a major new youth soccer complex being built in the city to compete for what was described as the lucrative Texas youth soccer event market. At the time it was stated that San Antonio had only a fraction of the youth soccer facilities available in other Texan cities of Dallas, Houston and Austin. All seemed to be in place and plans on course until a media campaign against the soccer proposals exposing that the team would only be leased with the Alamodome for three years. After three years the team would have to vacate to a soccer-specific stadium.

After Hurricane Katrina, the city set their goal of earning an NFL franchise. The prospects for the franchise were further hindered when it became a political football during the election for Mayor, which was won by Phil Hardberger who instantly distanced the city from any deal with MLS. MLS meanwhile released a statement claiming that they had planned to withdraw before the election but did not wish to comment until afterwards in order to "respect the electoral process in San Antonio." The deal died with both sides blaming each other for its demise.

In 2018, the Alliance of American Football announced that the San Antonio Commanders would play in the city beginning in 2019. The Commanders opened play at the Alamodome in February 2019; however, the league folded in the same year.

== Former teams ==
League	Club	Years	Venue	Championship years
=== Basketball - Men's ===
ABA	Texas Fuel	2008-2016	Palo Alto College	0
TBL	San Antonio Clutch	2024-2025	Antioch Sports Complex	0
=== Basketball - Women's ===
WNBA	San Antonio Stars (Silver Stars from 2003-2014)	2003-2017	SBC Center	0
=== Baseball ===
Texas League	San Antonio	1884	unknown	0
Texas-Southern League	San Antonio Missionaries (folded May 24)	1888	Muth's Park	0
Texas League	San Antonio Cowboys (moved from Austin July 4)	1888	Muth's Park	0
Texas League	San Antonio Missionaries	1892	San Pedro Springs Park	0
Texas League	San Antonio Missionaries (disbanded Aug 6)	1895	San Pedro Springs Park	0
Texas League	San Antonio Bronchos	1896-1897	San Pedro Springs Park	1897 (Co-Champs)
Texas League	San Antonio Gentlemen	1898	San Pedro Springs Park	0
Texas League	San Antonio Bronchos	1899	San Pedro Springs Park	0
South Texas League	San Antonio Mustangs	1903-1904	San Pedro Springs Park	1903
South Texas League	San Antonio Warriors	1905	San Pedro Springs Park	0
South Texas League	San Antonio Bronchos	1906	San Pedro Springs Park	0
Texas League	San Antonio Bronchos	1907–1912	Electric Park	1908
Texas League	San Antonio Bronchos	1913-1918	Block Stadium	0
Texas League	San Antonio Aces	1919	Block Stadium	0
Texas League	San Antonio Bears	1921-1923	Block Stadium	0
Texas League	San Antonio Bears	1924-1928	League Park (San Antonio)	0
Texas League	San Antonio Indians	1925-1931	League Park (San Antonio)	0
Texas League	San Antonio Indians	1932	League Park (San Antonio), Eagle Field, Tech Field (San Antonio)	0
Texas League	San Antonio Missions	1933-1942	Tech Field (San Antonio)	1933
Texas League	San Antonio Missions	1946	Tech Field (San Antonio)	0
Texas League	San Antonio Missions	1947-1962	Mission Stadium	1950, 1961
Texas League	San Antonio Bullets	1963-1964	Mission Stadium	1964
Texas League	San Antonio Missions	1968-1971	V. J. Keefe Memorial Stadium	0
Texas League	San Antonio Brewers	1972-1976	V. J. Keefe Memorial Stadium	0
Texas League	San Antonio Dodgers	1977-1987	V. J. Keefe Memorial Stadium	0
Texas League	San Antonio Missions	1988-1993	V. J. Keefe Memorial Stadium	0
Texas League	San Antonio Missions	1994-2018	Nelson W. Wolff Municipal Stadium	1993, 2003, 2007, 2011, 2013
Negro Leagues	San Antonio Brinchos	1907-1918	unknown	unknown
Negro Leagues	San Antonio Black Bronchos	1908-1909	unknown	unknown
Negro Leagues	San Antonio Black Aces	1919-1920	unknown	1 / 1919
Negro Leagues	San Antonio Black Indians	1920-1927	unknown	unknown
Negro Leagues	San Antonio Black Bronchos	1923-1925	unknown	unknown
Negro Leagues	San Antonio Porters	1924	unknown	unknown
Negro Leagues	San Antonio	1926	unknown	unknown
Negro Leagues	San Antonio Black Sheep Herders	1929	unknown	unknown
Negro Leagues	San Antonio Black Bombers	unknown	unknown	unknown
Texas-Louisiana League	San Antonio Tejanos	1995	V. J. Keefe Memorial Stadium	unknown
=== Football - Outdoor ===
Continental Football League (CFL) /Texas Football League (TFL)/Trans-American Football League (TAFL)	San Antonio Toros	1967-1971	Alamo Stadium / North East Stadium / Harlandale Memorial Stadium	1969
World Football League (WFL)	San Antonio Wings	1975	Alamo Stadium	unknown
American Football Association (AFA)	San Antonio Charros	1977-1981	Alamo Stadium	unknown
United States Football League (USFL)	San Antonio Gunslingers	1984–1985	Alamo Stadium	unknown
World League of American Football (WLAF)	San Antonio Riders	1991-1992	Alamo Stadium	unknown
Canadian Football League (CFL)	San Antonio Texans	1995	Alamodome	unknown
Spring Football League (SFL)	San Antonio Matadors	2000	Alamo Stadium	2000 (Co-champs)
National Football League (NFL)	New Orleans Saints	2005	Alamodome	unknown
Alliance of American Football (AAF)	San Antonio Commanders	2019	Alamodome	0
XFL/UFL	San Antonio Brahmas	2023–2025	Alamodome	0
=== Football - Indoor ===
Arena Football League (AFL)	San Antonio Force	1992	HemisFair Arena	0
Arena Football League (AFL)	San Antonio Talons	2011-2014	Alamodome	0
National Indoor Football League (NIFL)	San Antonio Steers	2007	unknown	0
=== Hockey ===
Central Hockey League (CHL)	San Antonio Iguanas	1994–1997 and 1998–2002	Hemisfair Arena	unknown
International Hockey League (IHL)	San Antonio Dragons	1996–1998	Hemisfair Arena	unknown
American Hockey League (AHL)	San Antonio Rampage	2002-2020	AT&T Center	0
=== Soccer ===
North American Soccer League (NASL)	San Antonio Thunder	1975–1976	unknown	unknown
Lone Star Soccer Alliance	San Antonio International	1987–1989	unknown	unknown
Lone Star Soccer Alliance	San Antonio Alamo	1989–1990	unknown	unknown
SISL	San Antonio Heat	1988–1989	unknown	unknown
SISL	San Antonio Generals	1989–1993	unknown	unknown
Lone Star Soccer Alliance (LSSA)	San Antonio XLR8	1992	unknown	unknown
USISL	San Antonio Pumas	1993–1998	unknown	unknown
NASL	San Antonio Scorpions	2011-2015	unknown	1 / 2014
=== Tennis ===
WTT	San Antonio Racquets	1985-1994	unknown	1986 and 1989

== Professional athletes from San Antonio ==
Athlete	Additional comments
=== Baseball ===
Jason Alfaro	n.a.
Richard Bartel	n.a.
Matt Batts	n.a.
Josh Beckett	n.a.
Gary Bell	n.a.
Fox Blevins	n.a.
Norm Charlton	n.a.
Randy Choate	n.a.
Frank Croucher	n.a.
Odie Davis	n.a.
Steve Davis	n.a.
Scott Dunn	n.a.
Homer Ezzell	n.a.
Ferris Fain	n.a.
Alva Jo Fisher	n.a.
Cy Fried	n.a.
Cito Gaston	n.a.
Bill Gatewood	n.a.
John Gibbons	n.a.
Tim Griesenbeck	n.a.
Jerry Grote	n.a.
Clint Hartung	n.a.
Danny Heep	n.a.
Bob Heise	n.a.
Joe Horlen	n.a.
Wilbur Huckle	n.a.
Danny Jackson	n.a.
Cliff Johnson	n.a.
Jace Jung	n.a.
Josh Jung	n.a.
N. D. Kalu	n.a.
Joan Kaufman	All-American Girls Professional Baseball League
Bob Kearney	n.a.
Logan Kensing	n.a.
Cotton Knaupp	n.a.
Jack Kraus	n.a.
Art Kruger	n.a.
Ryan Langerhans	n.a.
Brandon Larson	n.a.
John Leister	n.a.
Ruth Lessing	All-American Girls Professional Baseball League
Boone Logan	n.a.
James Lynch	n.a.
Jeff Manship	n.a.
Clyde McNeal	n.a.
John Miles	n.a.
Blas Monaco	n.a.
Jack Neely	n.a.
Fred Norman	n.a.
Al Ogletree	n.a.
Ken Pape	n.a.
Rod Pedraza	n.a.
Brooks Raley	n.a.
Zac Reininger	n.a.
Pat Rockett	n.a.
Ray Sheppard	n.a.
Burch Smith	n.a.
Mike Smith	n.a.
Frank Snyder	n.a.
Justin Thompson	n.a.
Anthony Vasquez	n.a.
Jake Volz	n.a.
Arthur Carter Whitney	a.k.a. Pinky Whitney
Forrest Whitney	n.a.
=== Basketball ===
Devin Brown	Devin not only played high school basketball in San Antonio, but also played for UTSA (college) and San Antonio Spurs (NBA)
Jordan Clarkson	n.a.
Fennis Dembo	n.a.
Keith Edmonson	n.a.
Kingston Fleming	attended Brennan high school
Jeff Foster	n.a.
Askia Jones	n.a.
Wesley Matthews	n.a.
Shaquille O'Neal	n.a.
Bo Outlaw	n.a.
Trent Plaisted	n.a.
Andre Robertson	n.a.
Ben Uzoh	n.a.
=== Bodybuilding ===
Heather Armbust	n.a.
Vickie Gates	n.a.
=== Boxing ===
Ramon "Dinamita" Cardenas	n.a.
Robert Quiroga	n.a.
Jesse Rodriguez	n.a.
=== Football ===
Anthony Alabi	n.a.
Scott Ankrom	n.a.
Jace Amaro	n.a.
Patrick Bailey	n.a.
Glenn Blackwood	n.a.
Lyle Blackwood	n.a.
Chris Bordano	n.a.
Quincy Burler	n.a.
Cody Carlson	n.a.
Keith Cash	n.a.
Kerry Cash	n.a.
Bruce Collie	n.a.
Tony Darden	n.a.
Trey Darilek	n.a.
Quintin Demps	Quintin Demps currently is a safety in the NFL for the Chicago Bears. He was drafted by the Philadelphia Eagles in 2008 and previously played for the Houston Texans. He was an alumnus of The University of Texas at El Paso, and attended Theodore Roosevelt High School in San Antonio, Texas
Ty Detmer	n.a.
Ronald Flemons	n.a.
Philip Gaines	n.a.
Erik Flowers	n.a.
Darryl Grant	n.a.
Derwin Gray	n.a.
Gary Green	n.a.
Cedric Griffin	n.a.
David Hill	n.a.
Carlyle Holiday	n.a.
Brent Holmes	n.a.
Priest Holmes	n.a.
Morton Hopkins	n.a.
Rob Housler	n.a.
Weldon Humble	n.a.
Sam Hurd	n.a.
A.J. Johnson	n.a.
N.D. Kalu	n.a.
Wade Key	n.a.
Tommy Kramer	n.a.
Cedric Lawrence	n.a.
Keith Lee	n.a.
Hunter Lawrence	n.a.
Travis Lewis	n.a.
Wane McGarity	n.a.
Warren McVea	n.a.
Primo Miller	n.a.
Willie Mitchell	n.a.
Sammy Morris	n.a.
Tommy Nobis	n.a.
Joe Pawelek	n.a.
Robert Quiroga	n.a.
Jeramie Richardson	n.a.
Reggie Rivers	n.a.
Corey Robinson	n.a.
Aaron Ross	n.a.
Kyle Rote	n.a.
Tobin Rote	n.a.
Chris Samuels	n.a.
Greg Schorp	n.a.
Corey Sears	n.a.
Andrew Sendejo	n.a.
Scott Solomon	n.a.
Mykkele Thomson	n.a.
Michael Toudouze	n.a.
Alex Van Pelt	n.a.
=== Ninja Warrior ===
Brent Steffensen	Most noted for competing on American Ninja Warrior
=== Mixed martial arts (MMA) ===
Alivia Bierley	n.a.
=== Rodeo ===
Gene Lyda	n.a.
=== Shooting ===
Keith Sanderson	n.a.
=== Soccer ===
Julianna Pacheco	n.a.
Jonatham "Gordinho" Rexroat	Rexroat graduated (class of 2013) from Lady Bird Johnson High School and played varsity soccer. He is Johnson's first alumnus professional athlete. He has an honorable mention on the title by the school's district, NEISD. Rexroat signed his first professional soccer contract on December 20, 2015 for Club Calor of the Mexican professional FMF second division.
=== Swimming ===
Josh Davis	Olympic gold medalist
Jimmy Feigen	Olympic gold medalist
=== Tennis ===
Wilmer Allison	n.a.
Fiona Crawley	n.a.
=== Track and Field ===
Jennifer Gutierrez	Olympic triathlete
Fred Kerley	Olympic medalist
Anjanette Kirkland	Olympic gold medalist
Reuben Reina	n.a.
Tate Taylor	Gold in the 100m, 200m, and 4×100m at the 2026 World Athletics U20 Championship, attended: Harlan High School
Darold Williamson	Olympic gold medalist
=== Wrestling ===
Tully Blanchard	n.a.
Lance Cade	n.a.
Shoichi Funaki	n.a.
Jose Lothario	n.a.
Michael Shawn Hickenbottom	aka "Shawn Michaels"
Thunder Rosa	n.a.
Dusty Wolfe	n.a.

== See also ==
- List of baseball parks in San Antonio
- List of defunct Texas sports teams
- List of Texas sports teams
- List of people from San Antonio
