= List of Texas League stadiums =

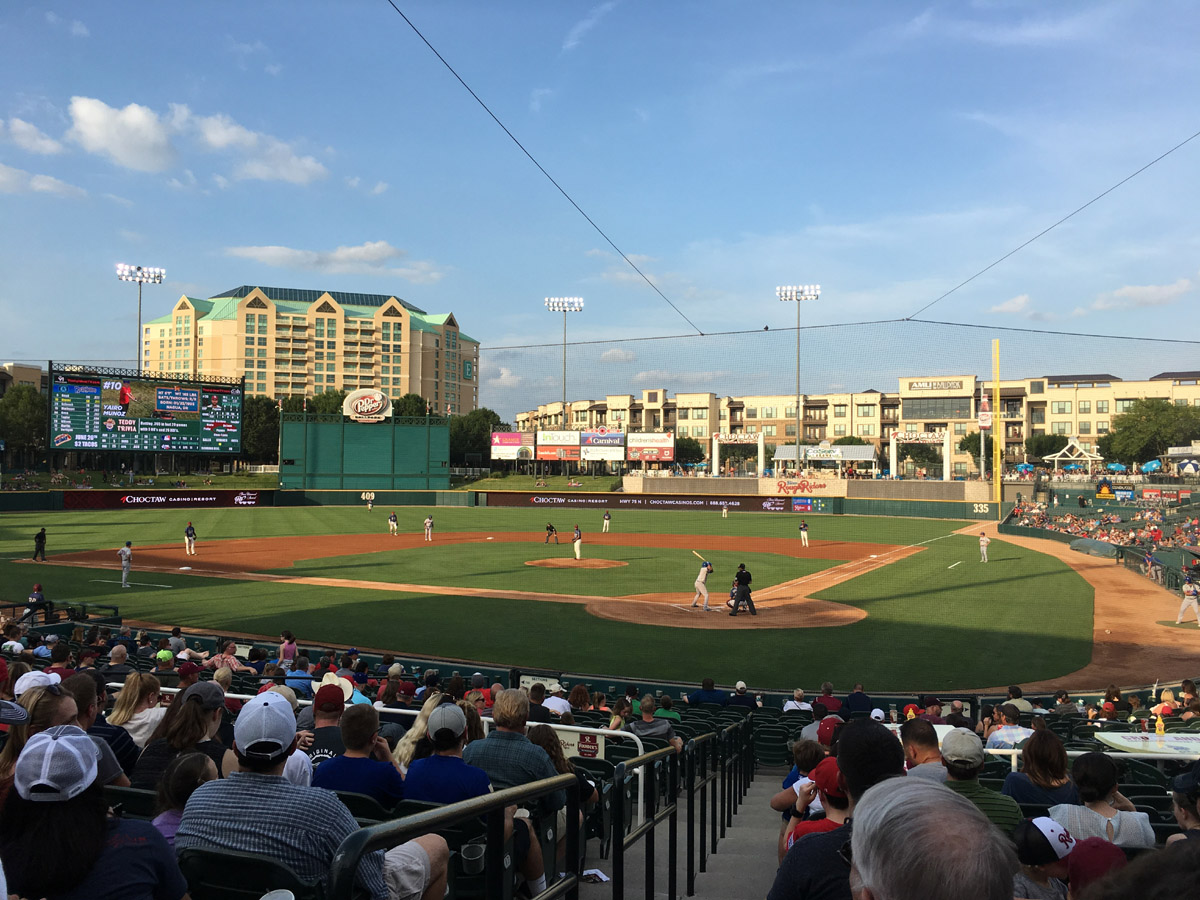
Riders Field, home of the Frisco RoughRiders

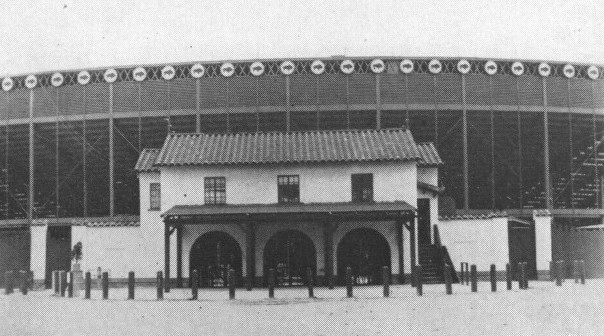
Busch Stadium, former home of the Houston Buffaloes

There are ten stadiums in use by Texas League (TL) baseball teams. The oldest stadium is Nelson W. Wolff Municipal Stadium (1994) in San Antonio, Texas, home of the San Antonio Missions. The newest stadium is Equity Bank Park (2020) in Wichita, Kansas, home of the Wichita Turbo Tubs. One stadium was built in the 1990s, six in the 2000s, two in the 2010s, and one in the 2020s. The highest seating capacity is 10,486 at Route 66 Stadium in Springfield, Missouri, where the Ozarks Springbirds play. The lowest capacity is 6,631 at Hodgetown in Amarillo, Texas, where the Amarillo Sod Poodles play. All stadiums use a grass surface.

Since its founding, there have been nearly 70 stadiums located among nearly 40 municipalities used by the league. The TL does not consider teams in existence from 1888 to 1890 as part of its franchise history. Therefore, the list does not include stadiums prior to it originating in 1902. Of the stadiums with known opening dates, the oldest to have hosted TL games was Gaston Park (1886), home of the Dallas Steers and Dallas Giants; Equity Bank Park is also the newest of all stadiums to host TL games. The highest known seating capacity was 21,000 at Turnpike Stadium, the Dallas–Fort Worth Spurs home. The stadiums with the lowest known capacity were League Park (Longview, Texas) and Trojan Park Athletic Field, the respective homes of the Longview Cannibals and Tyler Sports, which each seated only 2,500.

== Active stadiums ==
Name	Team	City	State	Opened	Capacity	Ref.
Arvest Ballpark	Northwest Arkansas Naturals	Springdale	Arkansas	2008	7,305	
Dickey–Stephens Park	Arkansas Travelers	North Little Rock	Arkansas	2007	7,200	
Route 66 Stadium	Ozarks Springbirds	Springfield	Missouri	2004	10,486	
Hodgetown	Amarillo Sod Poodles	Amarillo	Texas	2019	6,631	
Momentum Bank Ballpark	Midland RockHounds	Midland	Texas	2002	6,669	
Nelson W. Wolff Municipal Stadium	San Antonio Missions	San Antonio	Texas	1994	9,200	
ONEOK Field	Tulsa Drillers	Tulsa	Oklahoma	2010	7,833	
Riders Field	Frisco RoughRiders	Frisco	Texas	2003	10,316	
Equity Bank Park	Wichita Turbo Tubs	Wichita	Kansas	2020	10,000	
Whataburger Field	Corpus Christi Hooks	Corpus Christi	Texas	2005	7,050	

=== Map ===
Current stadium locations:
- North Division
- South Division

=== Gallery ===
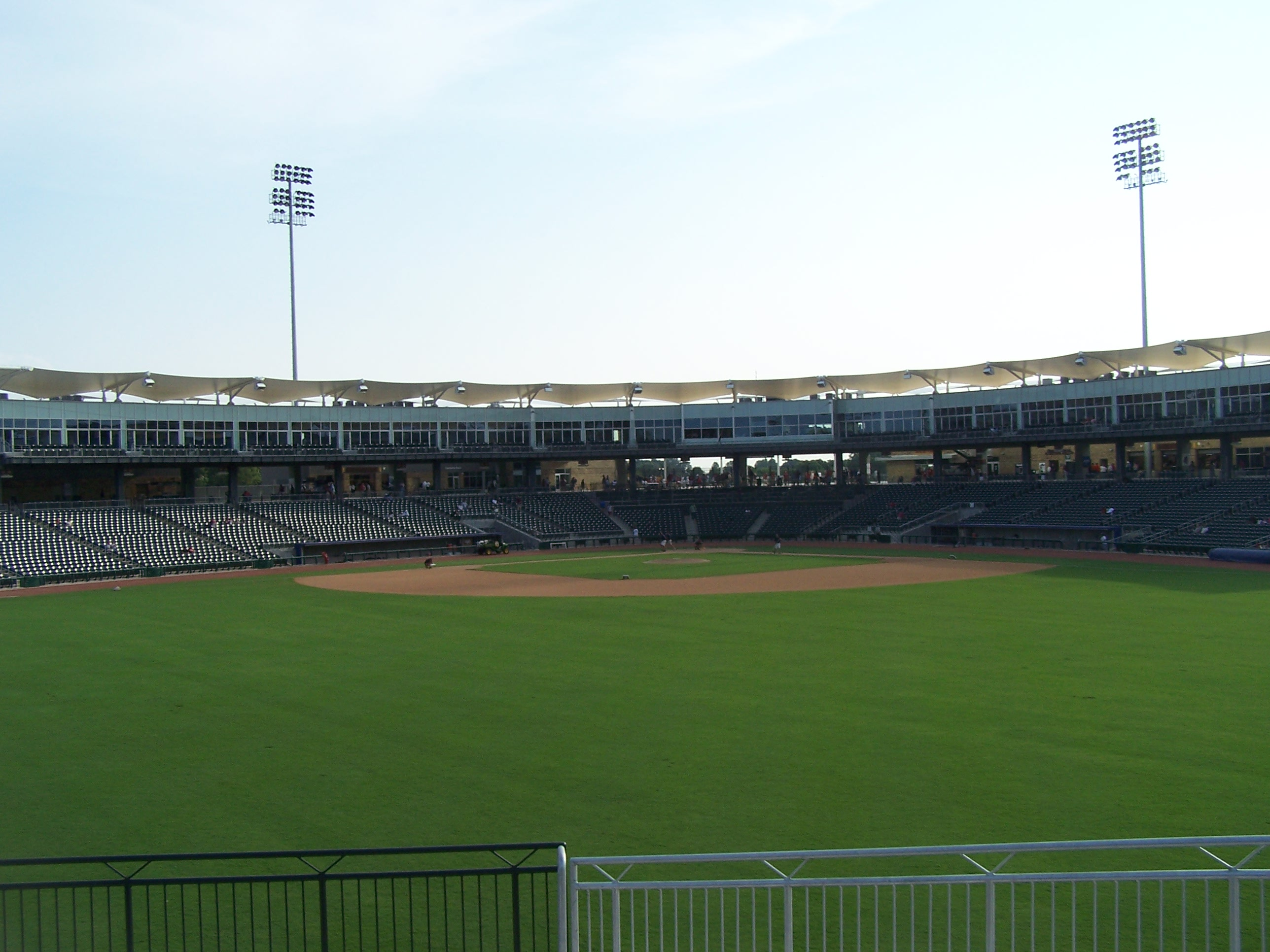
Arvest Ballpark (Northwest Arkansas Naturals)

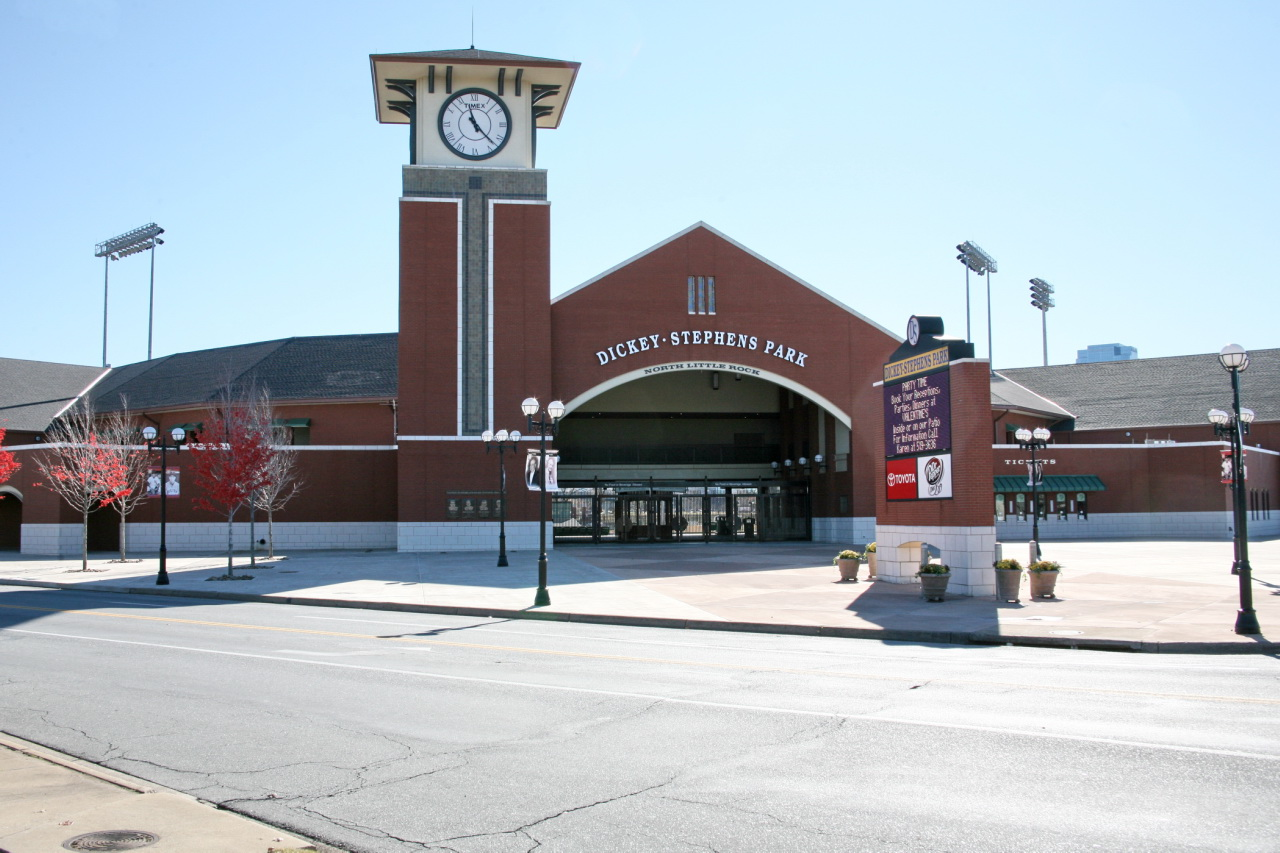
Dickey–Stephens Park (Arkansas Travelers)

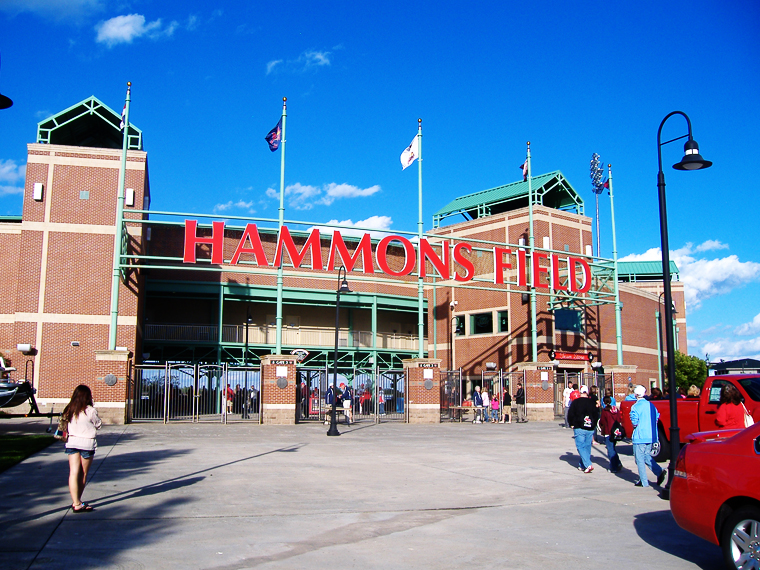
Route 66 Stadium (Springfield Cardinals)

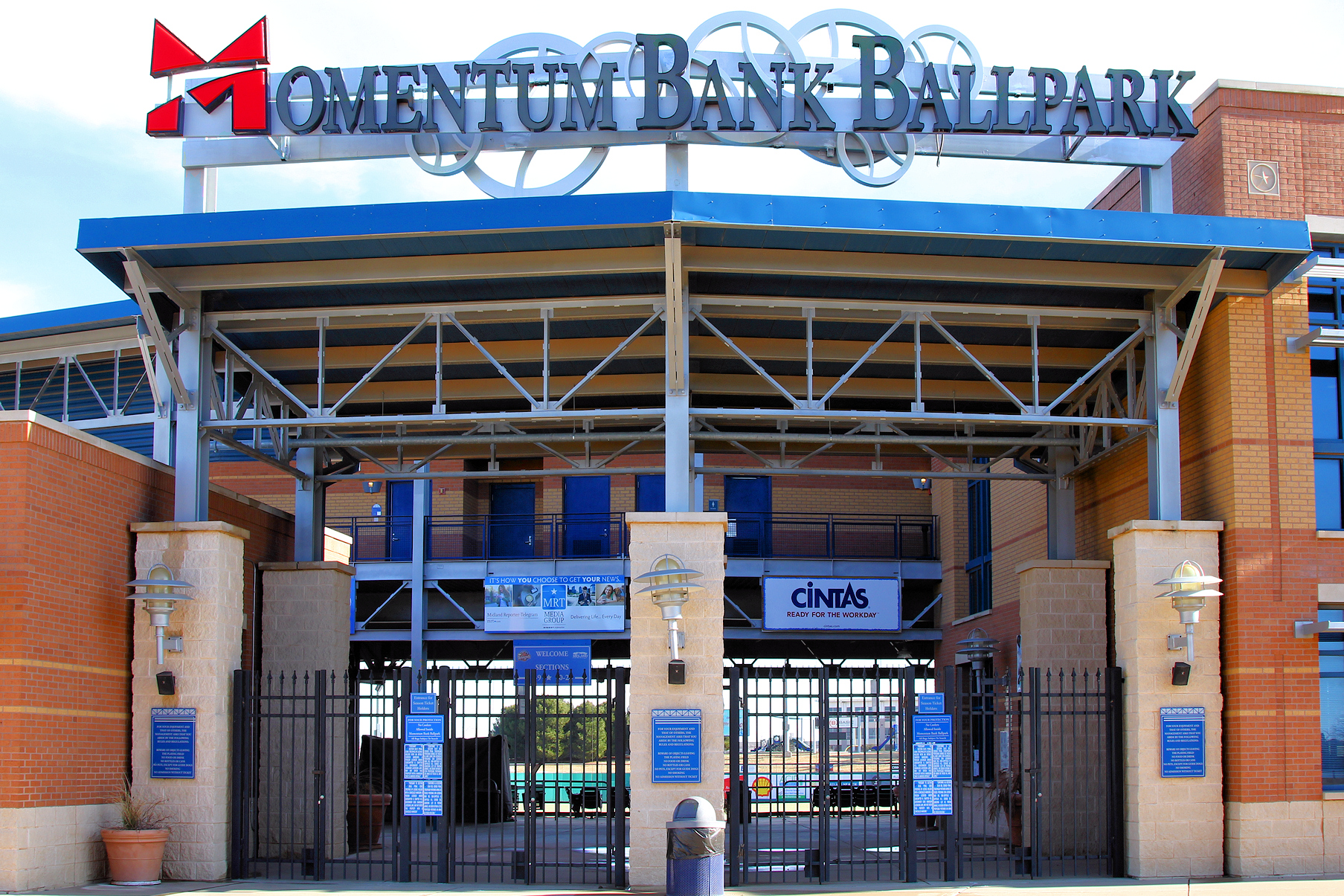
Momentum Bank Ballpark (Midland RockHounds)

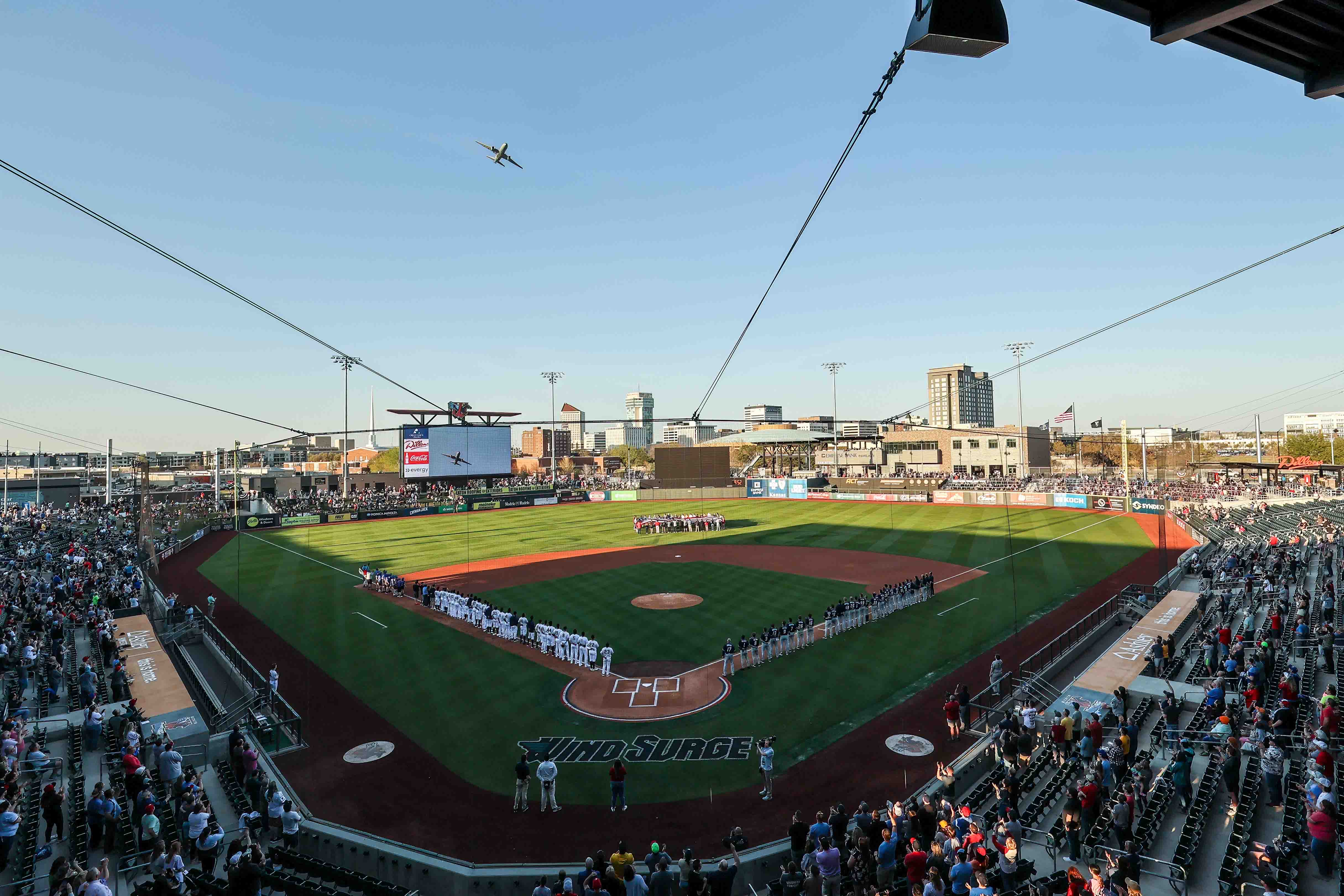
Equity Bank Park (Wichita Turbo Tubs)

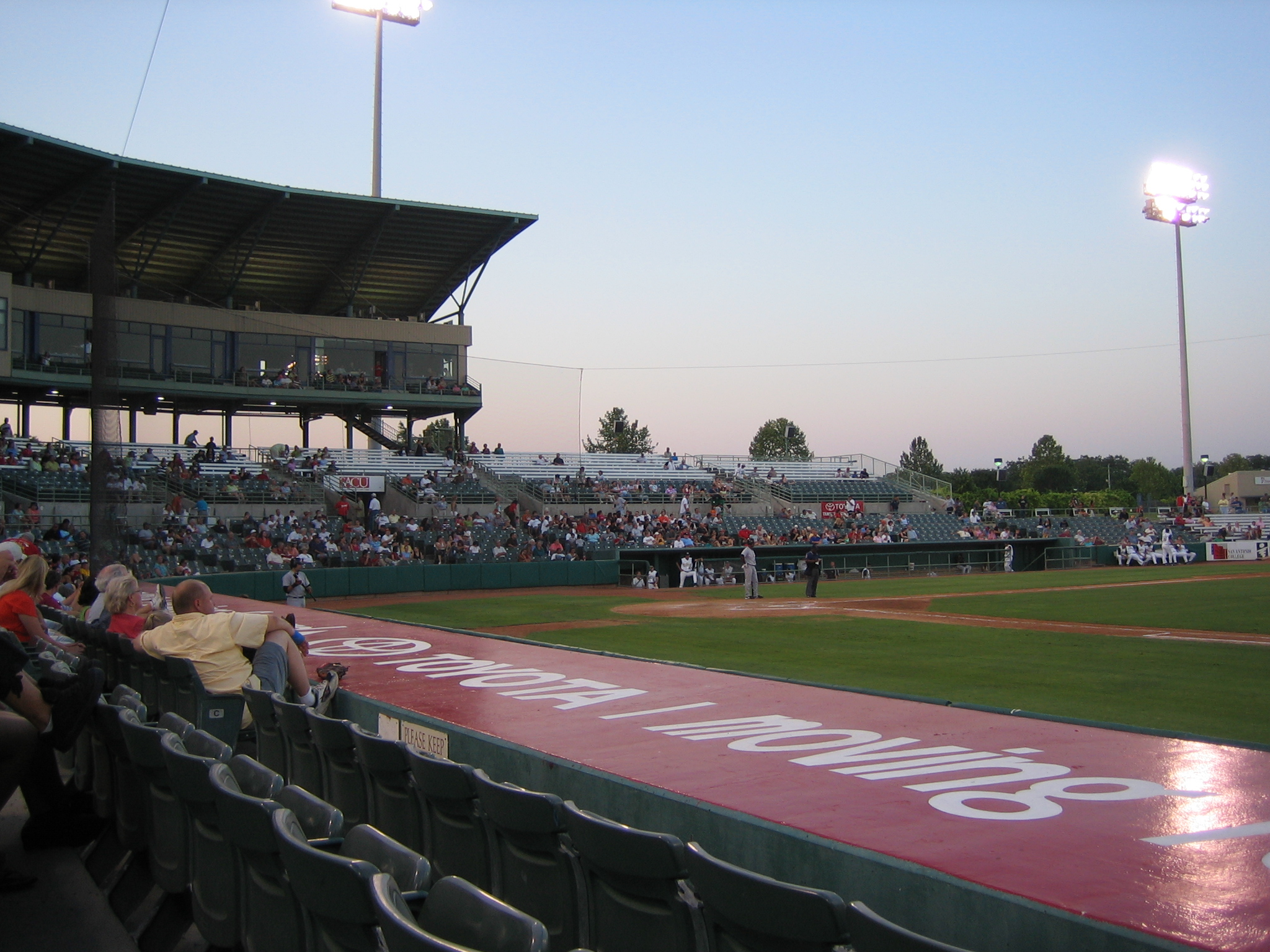
Nelson W. Wolff Municipal Stadium (San Antonio Missions)

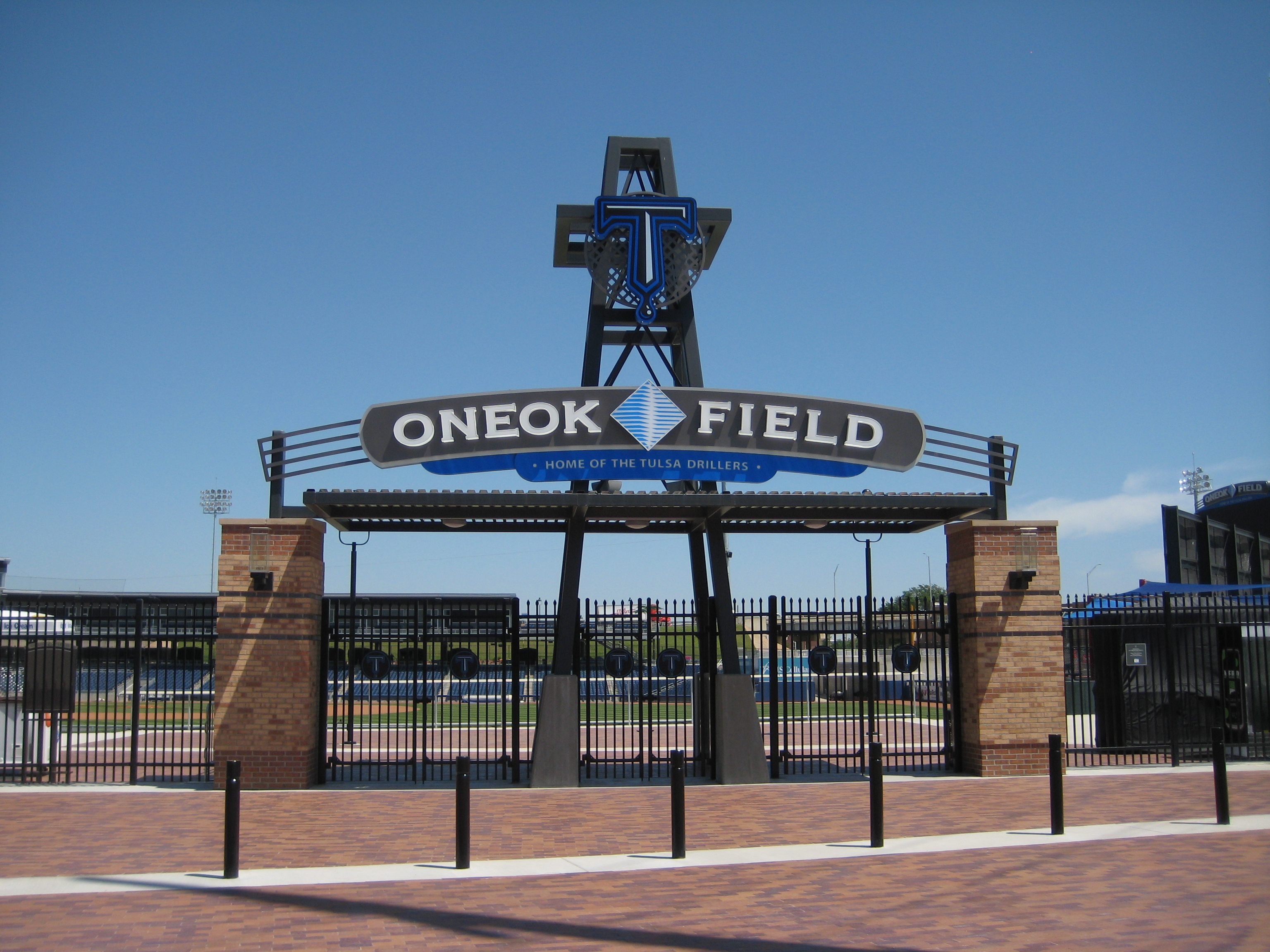
ONEOK Field (Tulsa Drillers)

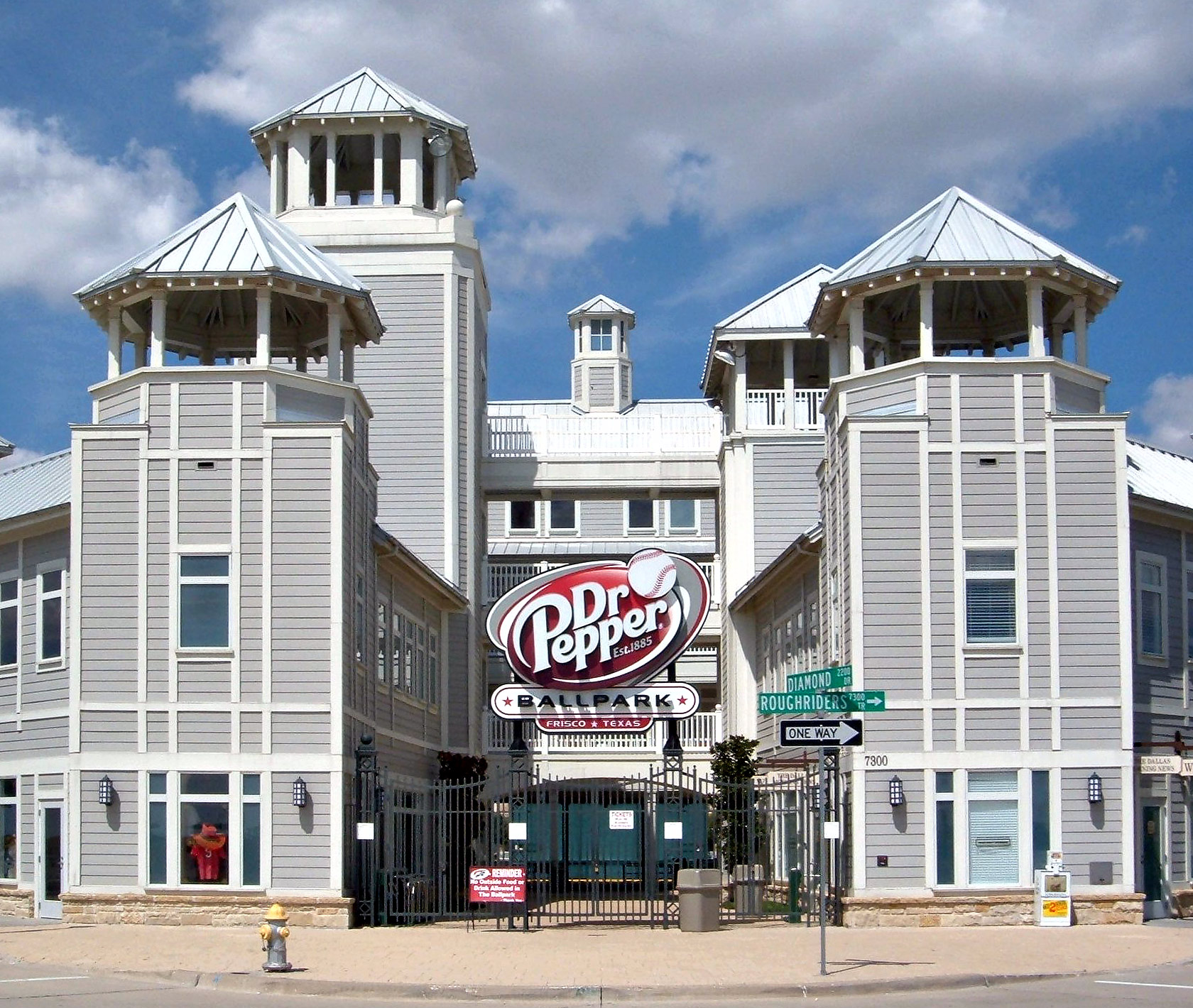
Riders Field (Frisco RoughRiders)

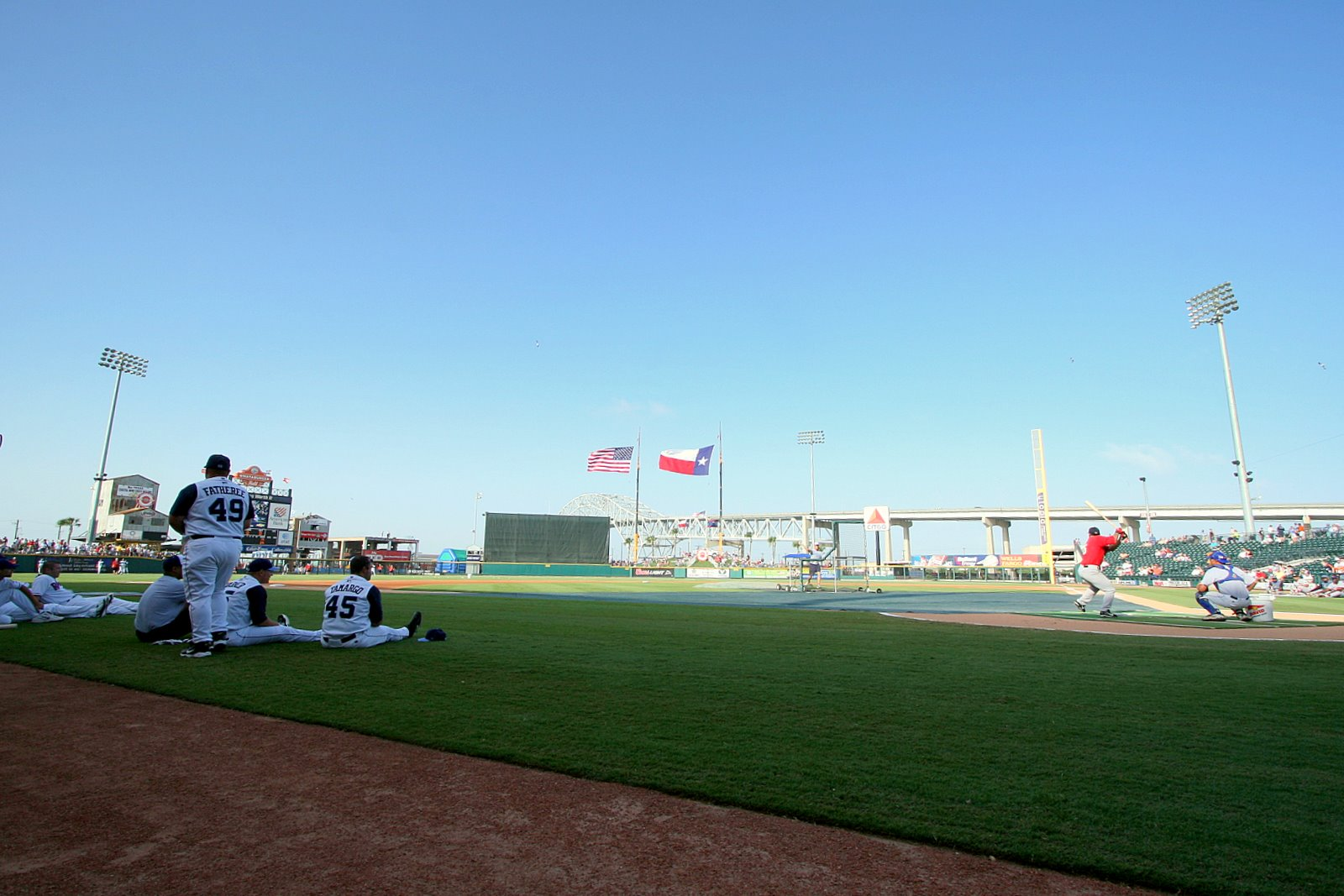
Whataburger Field (Corpus Christi Hooks)

== All stadiums ==
Key
Name	Stadium's name in its most recent season of hosting TL baseball
Opened	Opening of earliest stadium variant used for hosting TL baseball
Capacity	Stadium's most recent capacity while hosting TL baseball

Name	Team	Location	State	Opened	Capacity	Ref(s)
Albuquerque Sports Stadium	Albuquerque Dodgers	Albuquerque	New Mexico	1969	10,510	
Amarillo Dilla Villa (Note: Amarillo Dilla Villa was also known as Potter County Stadium (1957–1969) and Memorial Stadium (1970–2000).)	Amarillo Gold Sox/Sonics/Giants	Amarillo	Texas	1957	6,500	
Arvest Ballpark	Northwest Arkansas Naturals	Springdale	Arkansas	2008	7,305	
Beidenham Park (Note: Beidenham Park was also known as League Park (1901–1910) and Gassers Park (1915–1924).)	Shreveport Pirates, Shreveport Gassers, Shreveport Sports	Shreveport	Louisiana	1901	7,000	
Block Stadium (Note: Block Stadium was renamed League Park after 1915.)	San Antonio Bronchos/Aces, San Antonio Bears	San Antonio	Texas			
Bringhurst Field	Alexandria Aces	Alexandria	Louisiana	1932	4,500	
Burnett Field (Note: Burnett Field was also known as Steer Stadium (1925–1938), Rebel Field (1939–1948), and Eagles Stadium.)	Dallas Steers/Rebels/Eagles/Rangers	Dallas	Texas	1924	11,000	
Busch Stadium (Note: Busch Stadium was also known as Buffalo Stadium (1928–1952).)	Houston Buffaloes/Buffalos	Houston	Texas	1928	11,717	
Cardinal Park (Note: Cardinal Park was also known as Tribe Park (1948–1954).)	Ardmore Rosebuds	Ardmore	Oklahoma		4,000	
Christensen Stadium (Note: Christensen Stadium was also known as Cubs Stadium (1974–1984) and Angels Stadium (1985–1994).)	Midland Cubs/Angels/RockHounds	Midland	Texas	1952	5,000	
Clark Field (Note: Clark Field was also known as Bull Stadium.)	Lafayette Drillers	Lafayette	Louisiana	1954	5,100	
Cohen Stadium	El Paso Diablos	El Paso	Texas	1990	9,776	
Colcord Park	Oklahoma City Indians/Mets	Oklahoma City	Oklahoma	1902		
Dell Diamond	Round Rock Express	Round Rock	Texas	2000	8,631	
Dickey–Stephens Park	Arkansas Travelers	North Little Rock	Arkansas	2007	7,200	
Disch Field (Note: Disch Field was the precursor to Disch–Falk Field.)	Austin Senators, Austin Braves	Austin	Texas	1947	5,500	
Driller Park (Note: Driller Park was also known as Texas League Park, Tulsa County Stadium (1934), and Oiler Park (1961–1976).)	Tulsa Oilers, Tulsa Drillers	Tulsa	Oklahoma	1934	7,200	
Drillers Stadium (Note: Drillers Stadium was also known as Sutton Stadium (1981–1982) and Tulsa County Stadium (1983).)	Tulsa Drillers	Tulsa	Oklahoma	1981	10,842	
Dudley Field	El Paso Sun Kings/Sun Dodgers/Diablos	El Paso	Texas	1924	7,000	
Electric Park	San Antonio Bronchos	San Antonio	Texas			
Equity Bank Park (Note: Equity Bank Park was previously known as Riverfront Stadium.)	Wichita Wind Surge/Turbo Tubs	Wichita	Kansas	2020	10,000	
Fair Grounds Field	Shreveport Captains/Swamp Dragons	Shreveport	Louisiana	1986	6,400	
Fairgrounds Park	Tulsa Oilers	Tulsa	Oklahoma		10,000	
Gaston Park	Dallas Steers, Dallas Giants	Dallas	Texas	1886		
Giants Field (Note: Giants Field was also known as Lon C. Hill Stadium (1951–1977) and is now named Harlingen Field.)	Rio Grande Valley Giants	Harlingen	Texas		4,000	
Gorman's Park	Cleburne Railroaders	Cleburne	Texas			
Gulfview Park (Note: Gulfview Park was also known as Pirate Park (1919–1920).)	Galveston Sand Crabs, Galveston Pirates	Galveston	Texas	1915	4,000	
Hodgetown (Note: Hodgetown is also known as Amarillo Ballpark.)	Amarillo Sod Poodles	Amarillo	Texas	2019	6,631	
Katy Park	Waco Tigers, Waco Navigators, Waco Cubs	Waco	Texas	1905	3,000	
LaGrave Field (Note: LaGrave Field was also known as New Panther Park (1926–1928).)	Fort Worth Panthers/Cats	Fort Worth	Texas	1926	13,091	
Lawrence–Dumont Stadium (Note: Lawrence–Dumont Stadium was also known as Wichita Stadium (1950–1957) and Lawrence Stadium (1958–1977).)	Wichita Pilots/Wranglers	Wichita	Kansas	1934	6,058	
League Park	Longview Cannibals	Longview	Texas		2,500	
League Park (Note: League Park was located at a different site than Block Stadium, which had been renamed League Park.)	San Antonio Bears, San Antonio Indians	San Antonio	Texas	1925	7,500	
Magnolia Ballpark	Beaumont Oilers/Exporters	Beaumont	Texas		4,000	
Mission Stadium	San Antonio Missions/Bullets	San Antonio	Texas	1947	7,500	
Momentum Bank Ballpark (Note: Momentum Bank Ballpark was previously known as Scharbauer Sports Complex (2002), First American Bank Ballpark (2003–2005), Citibank Ballpark, and Security Bank Ballpark.)	Midland RockHounds	Midland	Texas	2002	6,669	
Moody Stadium	Galveston Buccaneers	Galveston	Texas		8,000	
Nelson W. Wolff Municipal Stadium (Note: Nelson W. Wolff Municipal Stadium was known as Municipal Stadium (1994–1995).)	San Antonio Missions	San Antonio	Texas	1994	9,200	
Oil City Park	Corsicana Oil City Indians/Oil Citys/Oil City Oilers/Oilers	Corsicana	Texas			
ONEOK Field	Tulsa Drillers	Tulsa	Oklahoma	2010	7,833	
Padgitt Park	Waco Tigers, Waco Steers	Waco	Texas			
Panther Park (New)	Fort Worth Panthers	Fort Worth	Texas		4,600	
Panther Park (Old)	Fort Worth Panthers	Fort Worth	Texas	1900	4,600	
Pirate Field	Galveston Pirates	Galveston	Texas			
Ray Winder Field (Note: Ray Winder Field was called Travelers Field prior to 1966.)	Arkansas Travelers	North Little Rock	Arkansas	1931	6,083	
Riders Field (Note: Riders Field was previously known as Dr. Pepper Ballpark.)	Frisco RoughRiders	Frisco	Texas	2003	10,316	
Riverside Park	Austin Senators	Austin	Texas			
Route 66 Stadium (Note: Route 66 Stadium was formerly known as Hammons Field.)	Springfield Cardinals/Ozarks Springbirds	Springfield	Missouri	2004	10,486	
Schepps Palm Field (Note: Schepps Palm Field was also known as Chamber of Commerce Park (1954–1956), Clipper Field, and Giants Field.)	Corpus Christi Giants	Corpus Christi	Texas	1949	5,106	
Smith–Wills Stadium	Jackson Mets, Jackson Generals	Jackson	Mississippi	1975	5,000	
SPAR Stadium (Note: SPAR Stadium was also known as Texas League Park (1938–1957), Bonneau Peters Field (1968), and Braves Field.)	Shreveport Sports, Shreveport Braves, Shreveport Captains	Shreveport	Louisiana	1935	3,000	
Spudder Park (Note: Spudder Park was also known as Athletic Park (1920–1926).)	Wichita Falls Spudders	Wichita Falls	Texas		5,000	
State Fair Racetrack (Note: State Fair Racetrack was used by the Dallas Steers from August 3, 1924 to the end of the season after Steer Park burned.)	Dallas Steers	Dallas	Texas		16,864	
Steer Park (Note: Steer Park was also known as Joe Gardner Park (1915–1916), Submarine Park (1917–1918), and Marine Park (1919–1922). It burned to the ground on July 19, 1924, and the Dallas Steers completed the season at State Fair Racetrack.)	Dallas Giants, Dallas Marines, Dallas Steers, Dallas Submarines	Dallas	Texas		7,500	
Stuart Stadium	Beaumont Exporters/Roughnecks	Beaumont	Texas	1929	7,500	
Tech Field (Note: After League Park burned in June 1932, the San Antonio Indians played the remainder of the season at Tech Field.)	San Antonio Indians, San Antonio Missions	San Antonio	Texas	1921	8,000	
Texas League Park (Note: Texas League Park was also called Jack Holland Field/Western League Park (1924–1948) and Tribe Park.)	Oklahoma City Indians	Oklahoma City	Oklahoma		9,000	
Tim McCarver Stadium (Note: Tim McCarver Stadium was also known as Blues Stadium.)	Memphis Blues	Memphis	Tennessee	1963	5,447	
Tingley Field (Note: Tingley Field was also known as Apprentice Field and Rio Grande Park.)	Albuquerque Dukes/Dodgers	Albuquerque	New Mexico	1932	5,315	
Toros Stadium (Note: Toros Stadium was also known as Riverside Park (1956–1961).)	Victoria Rosebuds, Victoria Giants, Victoria Toros	Victoria	Texas	1947	5,000	
Trojan Park Athletic Field (Note: The Shreveport Sports played the remainder of the 1932 season at Trojan Park Athletic Field as the Tyler Sports after Beidenham Park burned on May 4.)	Tyler Sports	Tyler	Texas		2,500	
Turnpike Stadium (Note: Turnpike Stadium was renamed Arlington Stadium (1972).)	Dallas–Fort Worth Spurs	Arlington	Texas	1965	21,000	
Vincent–Beck Stadium (Note: Vincent–Beck Stadium was also known as Cardinal Field (1969–1981).)	Beaumont Golden Gators	Beaumont	Texas	1969	4,500	
V. J. Keefe Memorial Stadium	San Antonio Brewers/Dodgers/Missions	San Antonio	Texas	1960	3,500	
West End Park	Houston Mud Cats/Buffaloes	Houston	Texas		5,200	
Whataburger Field	Corpus Christi Hooks	Corpus Christi	Texas	2005	7,050	
Whitley Park	Texarkana Casket Makers	Texarkana	Texas			

=== Map ===
Texas League stadium locations

== See also ==
- List of Double-A baseball stadiums
- List of Eastern League stadiums
- List of Southern League stadiums
- List of Texas League teams
