= List of baseball parks in San Antonio =

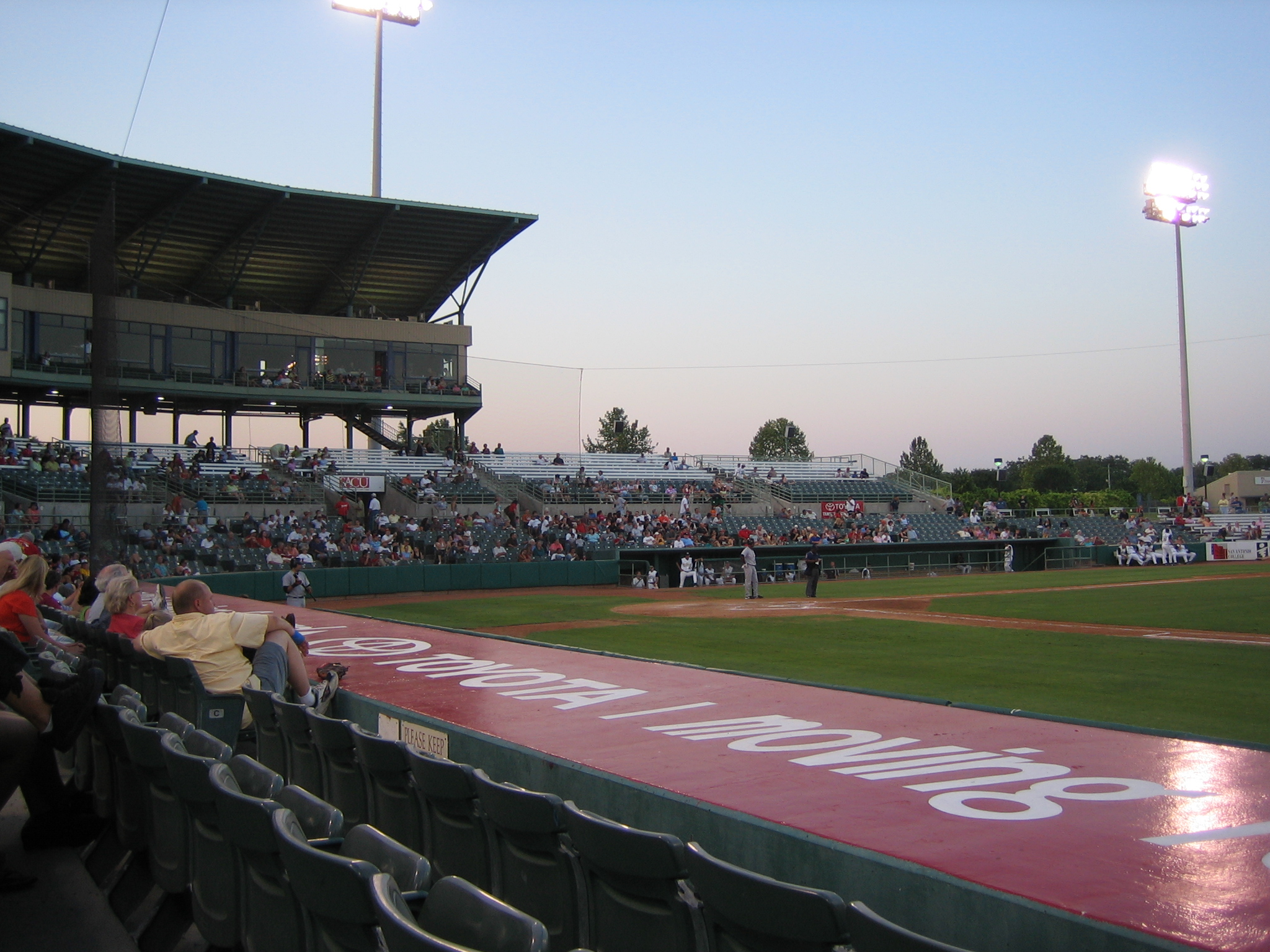
Wolff Stadium

This is a selected list of venues used for professional baseball in San Antonio, Texas, United States. The information is a synthesis of the information contained in the references listed.

Muth's Park
Home of: San Antonio - Texas League (1888)

San Pedro Park
Home of: San Antonio - Texas League (1892); San Antonio Missionaries - Texas Southern League (1895); San Antonio Bronchos - Texas League (1896–1899); San Antonio Bears (originally Bronchos or Broncos) - South Texas League (1903–1905)
Location / notes: San Pedro Park, a.k.a. San Pedro Springs Park, is an old public park in the city. The ballpark was built in 1892 (replacing a racetrack) and existed until 1966, when it was converted to a softball center. The softball center is in the southeast corner of the public park, i.e. on the northwest corner of San Pedro Avenue (east) and West Myrtle Street (south). Other streets bounding the city park are North Flores Street (west) and West Ashby Place (north). San Antonio College is across San Pedro Avenue to the east.

Electric Park
Home of: San Antonio Bronchos - South Texas League (1906), Texas League (1907–1912)
Note: Electric Park was an amusement park.

Block Stadium (renamed "League Park" after 1915)
Home of: San Antonio Bronchos/Aces/Bears - Texas League (1913–1923)
Location: Southern edge of downtown; torn down in 1927

League Park
Home of: San Antonio Bears/Indians - Texas League (1923–1932)
Location: northeast corner of East Josephine Street and Isleta Street; burned down in June 1932

Eagle Field
Home of: San Antonio Indians - Texas League (1932, partial season)
Location: According to Google Maps, the ballfield still exists as part of the athletic complex of Brackenridge High School, at the south edge of property bounded by Eagleland Drive (northwest), South St. Mary's Street (northeast), and San Antonio River (south).

Tech Field (owned by San Antonio Independent School District)
Home of: San Antonio Missions - Texas League (1932–1942, 1946)
Location: northwest corner of San Pedro Avenue and West Myrtle Street, across from San Antonio College, according to Google Maps
Currently: athletic field. Same site as San Pedro Park.

Mission Stadium
Home of: San Antonio Missions/Bullets - Texas League (1947–1964)
Location: Mission Road (west and north, third base, left field); Mitchell Street (south, first base); Steves Avenue (north and east, center field and right field).
Currently: parking lot for office complex

V. J. Keefe Field a.k.a. V. J. Keefe Memorial Stadium
Opened: 1960
Home of: San Antonio Missions/Brewers/Dodgers/Missions - TL (1968–1993)
Location: Campus of St. Mary's University - University Drive (north, third base); Rattler Drive (west and south, first base and right field)
Currently: rebuilt as Dickson Stadium, still used by the university

Nelson W. Wolff Municipal Stadium, a.k.a. Wolff Stadium
Home of: San Antonio Missions - TL (1994–present)
Location: Castroville Road and Interstate 90 (south, right field); Callaghan Road (east, left field)

== See also ==
- Lists of baseball parks
- Sports in San Antonio

== Sources ==
- Michael Benson, Ballparks of North America, McFarland & Company, 1989.
- Peter Filichia, Professional Baseball Franchises, 1993.
- David King, San Antonio at Bat: Professional Baseball in the Alamo City, Texas A&M University Press, 2004.
