= San Antonio Missions =

- Founded in 1888; San Antonio, Texas
Team logo
Cap insignia

Minor league affiliations
- Class: Double-A (2021–present)
- Previous classes: Triple-A (2019–2020); Double-A (1946–1964, 1968–2018); Class A1 (1936–1942); Class A (1921–1935); Class B (1911–1920); Class C (1896–1899, 1903–1910); Class B (1892, 1895)
- League: Texas League (2021–present)
- Division: South Division
- Previous leagues: Pacific Coast League (2019–2020); Texas League (1907–1942, 1946–1964, 1968–2018); South Texas League (1903–1906); Texas Association (1896-1899); Texas-Southern League (1895); Texas League (1892); Texas-Southern League (1888); Texas League (1888)

Major league affiliations
- Team: San Diego Padres (2021–present)
- Previous teams: Milwaukee Brewers (2019–2020); San Diego Padres (2007–2018); Seattle Mariners (2001–2006); Los Angeles Dodgers (1977–2000); Texas Rangers (1976); Cleveland Indians (1973–1975); Milwaukee Brewers (1972); Chicago Cubs (1968–1971); Houston Colt .45s (1963–1964); Chicago Cubs (1959–1962); St. Louis Browns/Baltimore Orioles (1933–1942, 1946–1958)

Minor league titles
- Dixie Series titles (1): 1950
- League titles (14): 1897; 1903; 1908; 1933; 1950; 1961; 1963; 1964; 1997; 2002; 2003; 2007; 2011; 2013
- Division titles (12): 1973; 1979; 1980; 1981; 1990; 1997; 2002; 2003; 2007; 2011; 2013; 2018
- First-half titles (14): 1897; 1903; 1979; 1980; 1981; 1988; 1997; 1998; 2003; 2009; 2011; 2017; 2022; 2023
- Second-half titles (8): 1990; 1997; 2001; 2002; 2003; 2007; 2011; 2017
- Wild card berths (4): 2005; 2008; 2013; 2018

Team data
- Name: San Antonio Missions (1988–present)
- Previous names: San Antonio Dodgers (1977–1987); San Antonio Brewers (1972–1976); San Antonio Missions (1968–1971); San Antonio Bullets (1963–1964); San Antonio Missions (1933–1942, 1946–1962); San Antonio Indians (1929–1932); San Antonio Bears (1920–1928); San Antonio Aces (1919); San Antonio Bronchos (1906–1918); San Antonio Warriors (1905); San Antonio Mustangs (1903–04); San Antonio Bronchos (1899); San Antonio Bronchos/Gentlemen (1898); San Antonio Bronchos (1896-1897); San Antonio Missionaries (1895)
- Colors: Navy blue, gold, red, white
- Mascot: Ballapeño
- Ballpark: Nelson W. Wolff Municipal Stadium (1994–present)
- Previous parks: V. J. Keefe Field (1968–1993); Mission Stadium (1947–1964); Tech Field (1932–1942, 1946); League Park (1915–1932); Block Stadium (1913–1914); Electric Park (1906-12); San Pedro Park(1896-99,1903-05); Riverside Park(1896); San Pedro Park (1892,1895); Muth's Park (1888)
- Owner/ Operator: Designated Bidders LLC
- President: Burl Yarbrough
- General manager: Dave Gasaway
- Manager: Chris Tremie
- Website: milb.com/san-antonio

The San Antonio Missions are a Minor League Baseball team based in San Antonio, Texas. The Missions compete in the Texas League as the Double-A affiliate of the San Diego Padres. The team plays its home games at Nelson W. Wolff Municipal Stadium, which opened in 1994 and seats over 6,200 people with a total capacity of over 9,000. The Missions are named for the Spanish missions around which the city was founded.

== History ==
=== Early years ===
San Antonio was home for one of the charter members of the Texas League back in 1888. Since that inaugural season the town has hosted a number of Texas League franchises, most of them using the Missions moniker. Baseball was absent only a few of the early years (1889-1891, 1893–1894, 1900–1902) and again when World War II occupied most would-be ballplayers between 1943 and 1945. Initially the team went by the names "Missionaries", "Gentlemen", and "Bronchos"—a Spanish twist on the name "Broncos". During these years, nearly 250 players reached the major leagues.

The current Missions moniker was coined with the team's first major league affiliation, a partnership with the St. Louis Browns. They remained affiliated with the Browns through the Texas League's temporary demise after the 1942 season due to World War II. With the return of peace, they reaffiliated with the Browns, a partnership that continued in 1954 when they became the Baltimore Orioles. This affiliation lasted until 1959, when they struck up a partnership with the Chicago Cubs. While with the Browns/Orioles, the team saw well over 100 players reach the Major League Baseball, including Hall-of-Famers Willard Brown (1956) and Brooks Robinson (1956–1957).

The Missions won the Dixie Series, a postseason interleague championship between the champions of the Southern Association and the Texas League, in 1950, defeating the Nashville Vols, 4–3, in the best-of-seven series. The Missions won the Pan American Series a postseason interleague championship between the champions of the Mexican League and Texas League, in 1961 defeaeating the Veracruz Aguilas 4–2 in the best of seven series.(Encyclopedia of Minor League Baseball, Third Edition, 2007, Lloyd Johnson and Miles Wolff, editors.) The Missions name was used for the teams affiliated with the Cubs, through 1962. In just four years in the Cubs' system, more than 50 alumni reached the major leagues—including future Hall of Famers Ron Santo (1959) and Billy Williams (1959).

The Missions changed their name to the Bullets in 1963, when the team joined the new Houston Colt .45s organization. The idea behind the name was that the team's prospects would be the "bullets to the gun" of the .45s team. The Bullets boasted 30 prospects that would go on to see time in Major League Baseball, including Hall-of-Famer Joe Morgan and two-time National League All-Star Jerry Grote.

In 1965, the San Antonio franchise moved to Amarillo. Three years later, in 1968, baseball returned to San Antonio, again taking on the Missions name, as part of an expansion of the Texas League. Again playing as a Cubs affiliate, another 42 future big leaguers took the field over a four-year stretch. After the 1971 season, the team packed up again and moved to Midland, where they continued as the Midland Cubs.

In 1972, another ownership group brought baseball into town to replace the group that left to Midland, and brought with it an affiliation with the Milwaukee Brewers, just two years removed from their move to Wisconsin from Seattle. With the affiliation change to the Brewers, the franchise took the parent club's nickname—which it kept despite changes in affiliation to the Cleveland Indians (1973–1975) and Texas Rangers (1976). The Brewers nickname fit the city almost as well as it fit their single-season affiliate in Milwaukee, being the home of the Pearl Brewing Company.

The future major league players continued to pour onto the field through the affiliation changes, and more than 30 San Antonio Brewers made it to the top. Among them was Hall-of-Fame pitcher Dennis Eckersley, an Indians farmhand who tore through the Texas League in 1974.

=== Los Angeles Dodgers (1977–2000) ===
The team became the San Antonio Dodgers with a change in affiliation to the Los Angeles Dodgers in 1977. While the franchise kept the Dodger moniker for 11 seasons (1977–1987), locals still referred to them occasionally as the Missions. The Dodgers responded by officially changing their nickname back to Missions for the 1988 season.

The Missions were the Double-A affiliate of the Los Angeles Dodgers until 2000, making the relationship the longest-standing major league affiliation held by the San Antonio franchise. During the partnership, Dodgers legends frequented the Alamo City, including Tommy Lasorda. In the 23 years with Los Angeles, some 211 players went on to see time in the majors. That includes players like Ron Washington (1977), Bob Welch (1977), Ron Roenicke (1978–1979), Mike Scioscia (1978), Dave Stewart (1978), Orel Hershiser (1980–1981, 1991), Fernando Valenzuela (1980), Steve Sax (1981), Sid Bream (1982), Sid Fernandez (1983), Franklin Stubbs (1983), Ramón Martínez (1988, 1996), John Wetteland (1988), Eric Karros (1990), Pedro Martínez (1991), Raúl Mondesí (1991–1992), Eric Young (1991), Mike Piazza (1992), Henry Blanco (1993–1996), Todd Hollandsworth (1993), Chan Ho Park (1994), Miguel Cairo (1995), Paul Lo Duca (1995, 1997), Paul Konerko (1996), Alex Cora (1997), Dennys Reyes (1997), Adrián Beltré (1998), and Éric Gagné (1999).

The team played the bulk of its years with the Dodgers at V. J. Keefe Memorial Stadium, which they shared with the St. Mary's University baseball team. In 1994, the team moved into Nelson W. Wolff Municipal Stadium, utilizing a design typical of baseball stadiums build during the late-1980s through the mid-1990s. The new stadium was named in honor of Nelson Wolff, the mayor of San Antonio at the time the stadium was built.

The affiliation with the Dodgers ended after the 2000 season with both clubs mutually agreeing to part.

=== Seattle Mariners (2001–2006) ===
From 2001 until 2006, the Seattle Mariners had a player development contract with the team that brought back-to-back Texas League Championships during the 2002 and 2003 seasons.

The Mariners, fresh off a record season, was stocked with talent in a minor league system built by Pat Gillick, who worked with San Antonio as the farm director of the Houston Colt .45s in 1963. Gillick's prospects turned San Antonio into a Texas League powerhouse, boasting future major leaguers Willie Bloomquist, Jeff Farnsworth, J. J. Putz, Rafael Soriano, Greg Dobbs, Julio Mateo, Gil Meche, Cha Seung Baek, Jose Lopez, George Sherrill, Shin-Soo Choo, Félix Hernández, Mike Morse, Aaron Taylor, Aaron Looper, Allan Simpson, and Yuniesky Betancourt.

The 2006 Missions struggled to score runs and finished 60–77 overall (27–41, 33–37). The team was plagued by high player turnover and featured 52 different players over the course of the season.

=== San Diego Padres (2007–2018) ===
The Missions entered into a new player development contract with the San Diego Padres beginning in 2007. Randy Ready managed the Missions that season following a promotion from the Class A Fort Wayne Wizards. The first home game as a member of the Padres organization was on April 12, 2007, a 2–0 win against the Tulsa Drillers. Sean Thompson picked up the win and helped score a run. Led by Chase Headley and Josh Geer, who won Player of the Year and Pitcher of the Year honors respectively, the Missions were the 2007 Texas League Champions.

From the beginning of the affiliation with the Padres, the Missions saw nearly a dozen players go on to play the big leagues. Most notably include rising Padres regulars: Chase Headley, Kyle Blanks, Nick Hundley, Tim Stauffer, Mat Latos, Matt Antonelli, Chad Huffman, Will Venable, and Luis Durango.

The 2009 season started out with an exhibition game between players on the Missions roster and members of the Padres' big league Spring Training roster. The result was a 7–3 win for the minor league affiliate, bolstered by a grand slam by San Antonio-native Seth Johnston. Under the leadership of former MLB All-Star Terry Kennedy, the team earned a playoff berth by winning the first-half division title—clinching the berth on the road during an extra-innings win at Corpus Christi on June 23, the last game in the first half of the season.

The season was anticlimactic, however, as the team struggled down the final stretch and into playoffs. The Missions were eliminated by the Midland RockHounds, the eventual Texas League title winners, in four games—managing only to win one playoff game behind the pitching of Will Inman.

Several players stood out at times during the 2009 season, some of them being promoted for their performance. Outfielder Mike Baxter was promoted early on for his assault on Texas League pitching, batting .376 with 23 doubles in 51 games. Pitchers Tim Stauffer, Cesar Carrillo, and Mat Latos were promoted to the Padres after performing well at the Double-A level, though Stauffer and Carrillo both spent a few weeks at the Triple-A level before moving on to the Majors. First baseman Craig Cooper led the team with a .312 average and 11 home runs by the end of the season. Outfielder Luis Durango led the Texas League with 44 stolen bases. Right-hander Ernesto Frieri led the team in most pitching categories, finishing the season protected on the 40-man major league roster.

For the 2010 season, the Missions were managed by Doug Dascenzo, who previously managed Class A Fort Wayne TinCaps to the best regular-season record in Minor League Baseball and a Midwest League title in 2009. The 2010 Texas League All-Star Game featured seven Missions players, including three starters. Pitchers Simón Castro, Wynn Pelzer, Craig Italiano, and Evan Scribner were selected to represent the Missions along with catcher Luis Martinez, first baseman Matt Clark and outfielder Cedric Hunter. Just before the game, Cedric was promoted to the Triple-A Portland Beavers, allowing utility infielder Andy Parrino to attend the All-Star Game in his place.

The Missions got a hot start to the 2011 season, finishing April with the best record in Double-A baseball. They also amassed the most home runs of any team in Minor League Baseball in that time despite playing in the notoriously pitcher-friendly Wolff Stadium. Their early season success can be attributed to a roster filled with some of the top slugging prospects in the Padres' system, including Jaff Decker and Cody Decker (not related). They also had an offensive boost with the return of Kyle Blanks, who played for the Missions in 2008, and rehabbed with the Missions after Tommy John surgery. The Missions won the first-half division title, then won their twelfth Texas League Championship, sweeping the Arkansas Travelers in the Texas League Championship series. During the season, the team hosted the 75th Annual Texas League All-Star Game on June 29, 2011.

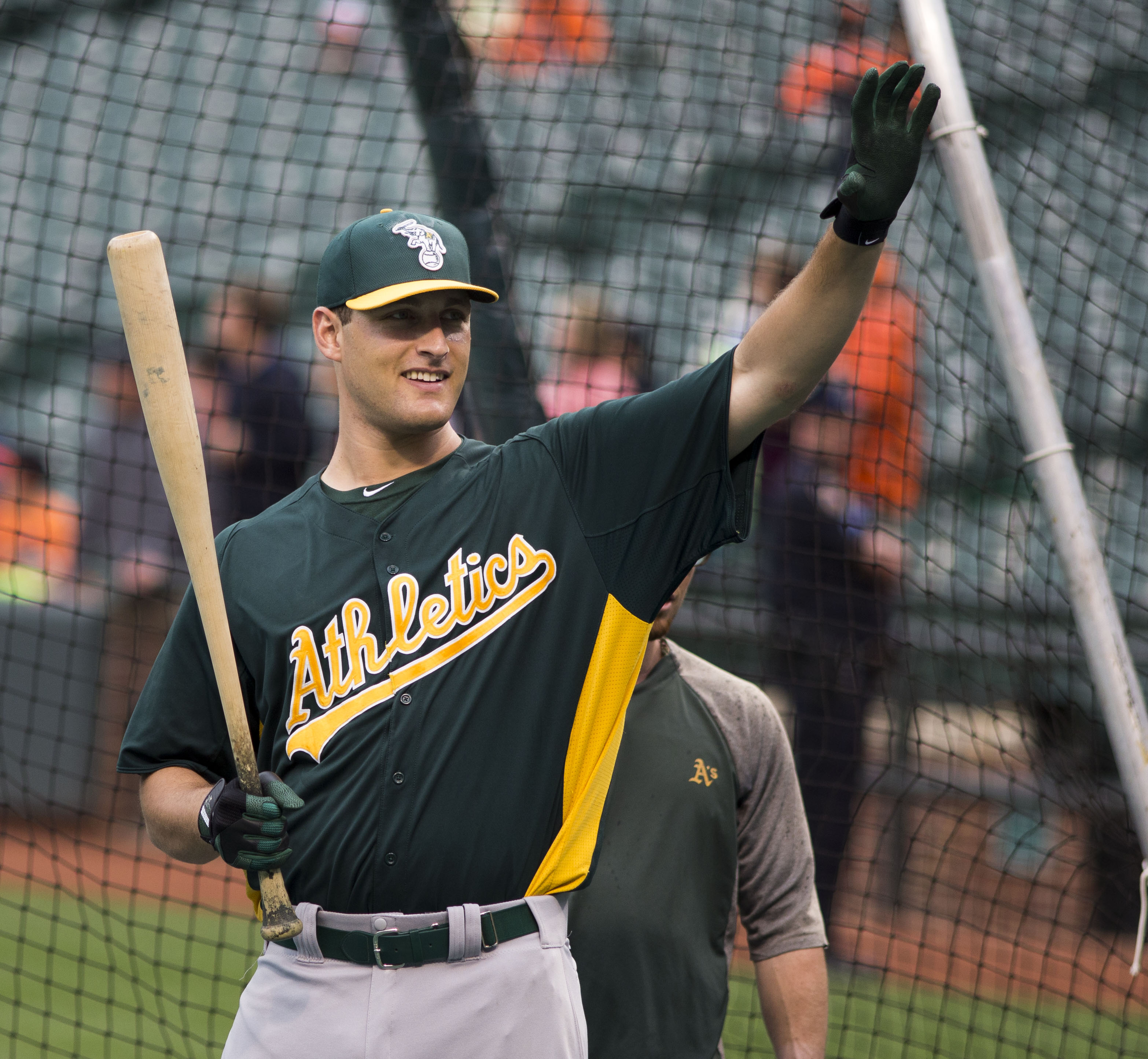
Nate Freiman

In 2012, Nate Freiman played for the Missions and led the league in RBIs (105) and hits (154). He was both a Texas League Mid-Season and Post-Season All-Star, and an MILB.com San Diego Padres All-Star.

The Missions began participation in Copa de la Diversión ("Fun Cup"), an initiative by Minor League Baseball to connect teams with their local Hispanic communities, in 2018. For Copa games, the Missions play as the San Antonio Flying Chanclas. The chancla, the Spanish term for a slipper or flip-flop, was chosen to honor the Hispanic grandmother for her strength, discipline, and love as she uses the footwear to keep her family in-line.

=== Milwaukee Brewers (2019–2020) ===
On June 21, 2017, team owner David G. Elmore of the Elmore Sports Group announced the relocation of the Triple-A Colorado Springs Sky Sox of the Pacific Coast League to San Antonio in 2019. The team would continue use of the Missions nickname, effectively elevating San Antonio to a Triple-A franchise. Meanwhile, the Missions Double-A franchise moved to Amarillo and continued to compete in the Texas League as the Amarillo Sod Poodles.

The Missions signed a two-year player development contract with the Milwaukee Brewers to be their top minor league affiliate through 2020. They played their first Triple-A game on April 4, 2019, a 5–3 win, against the Oklahoma City Dodgers at Chickasaw Bricktown Ballpark in Oklahoma City. The winning run was scored in the top of the ninth inning when Jake Hager hit an RBI triple scoring Nate Orf and Corey Ray. They won their first home game 6–5 over the Memphis Redbirds on April 9.

=== San Diego Padres (2021–present) ===
In conjunction with Major League Baseball's reorganization of the minors after the 2020 season, the Missions were selected to move back down to Double-A as affiliates of the San Diego Padres. In a further change, they were organized into the Double-A Central. In 2022, the Double-A Central became known as the Texas League, the name historically used by the regional circuit prior to the 2021 reorganization. Following the 2022 season, the team was purchased by Designated Bidders, LLC, a group of San Antonio business executives.

=== Season-by-season records ===
The following is a list of San Antonio's results since the 1968 season.

Table key
League	The team's final position in the league standings
Division	The team's final position in the divisional standings
GB	Games behind the team that finished in first place in the division that season
‡	Class champions (2019–2020)
†	League champions (1968–present)
§	Conference champions (2019–2020)
*	Division champions (1968–present)
^	Postseason berth (1977–2018)

Season-by-season records
Season	League	Regular season					Postseason			MLB affiliate	Ref.
Season	League	Record	Win %	League	Division	GB	Record	Win %	Result	MLB affiliate	Ref.
1968	TL	53–86	.381	8th	4th	25	—	—	Result	—	Chicago Cubs
1969	TL	51–81	.386	8th	4th	15 1/2	—	—	—	Chicago Cubs	
1970	TL	67–69	.493	5th	3rd	2	—	—	—	Chicago Cubs	
1971	TL	63–77	.450	10th (tie)	4th	24	—	—	—	Chicago Cubs	
1972	TL	53–87	.379	8th	4th	25	—	—	—	Milwaukee Brewers	
1973 *	TL	82–57	.590	1st	1st	—	2–3	.400	Won Western Division title Lost TL championship vs. Memphis Blues, 3–2	Cleveland Indians	
1974	TL	68–64	.515	5th	3rd	5 1/2	—	—	—	Cleveland Indians	
1975	TL	50–85	.370	8th	4th	31 1/2	—	—	—	Cleveland Indians	
1976	TL	63–71	.470	5th	3rd	17 1/2	—	—	—	Texas Rangers	
1977	TL	61–67	.477	5th (tie)	3rd	16	—	—	—	Los Angeles Dodgers	
1978	TL	79–57	.581	3rd	2nd	1 1/2	—	—	—	Los Angeles Dodgers	
1979^ *	TL	69–62	.527	4th	2nd	5	2–4	.333	Won Western Division title vs. Midland Cubs, 2–1; Lost TL championship vs. Arkansas Travelers, 3–0	Los Angeles Dodgers	
1980^ *	TL	74–62	.544	4th (tie)	2nd	3	2–3	.400	Won Western Division title vs. Amarillo Gold Sox, 2–0; Lost TL championship vs. Arkansas Travelers, 3–0	Los Angeles Dodgers	
1981^ *	TL	76–57	.571	1st	1st	—	2–4	.333	Won First-Half Western Division title Won Western Division title vs. Amarillo Gold Sox, 2–1; Lost TL championship vs. Jackson Mets, 3–0	Los Angeles Dodgers	
1982	TL	68–68	.500	5th (tie)	3rd	8	—	—	—	Los Angeles Dodgers	
1983	TL	66–70	.485	6th	3rd	8	—	—	—	Los Angeles Dodgers	
1984	TL	64–72	.471	4th	3rd	25	—	—	—	Los Angeles Dodgers	
1985	TL	59–75	.440	7th	3rd	26	—	—	—	Los Angeles Dodgers	
1986	TL	64–71	.474	5th	2nd	21	—	—	—	Los Angeles Dodgers	
1987	TL	50–86	.368	8th	4th	26	—	—	—	Los Angeles Dodgers	
1988^	TL	73–60	.549	2nd	2nd	1/2	0–2	.000	Won First-Half Western Division title Lost Western Division title vs. El Paso Diablos, 2–0	Los Angeles Dodgers	
1989	TL	49–87	.360	8th	4th	24	—	—	—	Los Angeles Dodgers	
1990^ *	TL	78–56	.582	1st	1st	—	4–5	.444	Won Second-Half Western Division title Won Western Division title vs. El Paso Diablos, 2–1; Lost TL championship vs. Shreveport Captains, 4–2	Los Angeles Dodgers	
1991	TL	61–75	.449	6th	4th	20	—	—	—	Los Angeles Dodgers	
1992	TL	62–74	.456	6th	4th	11	—	—	—	Los Angeles Dodgers	
1993	TL	58–76	.433	8th	4th	17 1/2	—	—	—	Los Angeles Dodgers	
1994	TL	62–74	.456	6th	2nd	26	—	—	—	Los Angeles Dodgers	
1995	TL	64–72	.471	6th	4th	8	—	—	—	Los Angeles Dodgers	
1996	TL	69–70	.496	6th	3rd	7	—	—	—	Los Angeles Dodgers	
1997 * †	TL	84–55	.604	1st	1st	—	4–3	.571	Won First and Second-Half Western Division titles Won Western Division title Won TL championship vs. Shreveport Captains, 4–3	Los Angeles Dodgers	
1998^	TL	67–73	.479	6th	3rd	8	2–3	.400	Won First-Half Western Division title Lost Western Division title vs. Wichita Wranglers, 3–2	Los Angeles Dodgers	
1999	TL	67–73	.479	6th	3rd	16	—	—	—	Los Angeles Dodgers	
2000	TL	64–76	.457	6th (tie)	4th	19	—	—	—	Los Angeles Dodgers	
2001^	TL	70–67	.511	3rd	2nd	14 1/2	2–3	.400	Won Second-Half Western Division title Lost Western Division title vs. Round Rock Express, 3–2	Seattle Mariners	
2002^ * †	TL	68–72	.486	6th	4th	9	7–5	.583	Won Second-Half Western Division title Won Western Division title vs. Round Rock Express, 3–2; Won TL championship vs. Tulsa Drillers, 4–3'	Seattle Mariners	
2003 * †	TL	88–51	.633	1st	1st	—	4–1	.800	Won First and Second-Half Western Division titles Won Western Division title Won TL championship vs. Frisco RoughRiders, 4–1	Seattle Mariners	
2004	TL	66–72	.478	6th	3rd	19	—	—	—	Seattle Mariners	
2005^	TL	76–64	.543	2nd	2nd	2	2–3	.400	Lost Western Division title vs. Midland RockHounds, 3–2	Seattle Mariners	
2006	TL	60–78	.435	7th	4th	17 1/2	—	—	—	Seattle Mariners	
2007^ * †	TL	73–66	.525	3rd	2nd	11 1/2	6–1	.857	Won Second-Half Western Division title Won Western Division title vs. Frisco RoughRiders, 3–0; Won TL championship vs. Springfield Cardinals, 3–1	San Diego Padres	
2008^	TL	75–65	.536	3rd (tie)	2nd (tie)	9 1/2	0–3	.000	Lost Southern Division title vs. Frisco RoughRiders, 3–0	San Diego Padres	
2009^	TL	70–70	.500	6th	3rd	8	1–3	.250	Won First-Half Southern Division title Lost Southern Division title vs. Midland RockHounds, 3–1	San Diego Padres	
2010	TL	68–72	.486	6th	3rd	4 1/2	—	—	—	San Diego Padres	
2011^ * †	TL	94–46	.671	1st	1st	—	6–1	.857	Won First and Second-Half Southern Division titles Won Southern Division title vs. Frisco RoughRiders, 3–1; Won TL championship vs. Arkansas Travelers, 3–0	San Diego Padres	
2012	TL	60–80	.429	7th	4th	21	—	—	—	San Diego Padres	
2013^ * †	TL	78–61	.561	2nd	2nd	4 1/2	6–4	.600	Won Southern Division title vs. Corpus Christi Hooks, 3–2; Won TL championship vs. Arkansas Travelers, 3–2	San Diego Padres	
2014	TL	68–72	.486	5th (tie)	3rd	12 1/2	—	—	—	San Diego Padres	
2015	TL	60–80	.429	8th	4th	29	—	—	—	San Diego Padres	
2016	TL	58–82	.414	8th	4th	27	—	—	—	San Diego Padres	
2017^	TL	78–62	.557	1st	1st	—	2–3	.400	Won First and Second-Half Southern Division titles Lost Southern Division title vs. Midland RockHounds, 3–2	San Diego Padres	
2018^ *	TL	71–67	.514	3rd	2nd	11	3–5	.375	Won Southern Division title vs. Corpus Christi Hooks, 3–2; Lost TL championship vs. Tulsa Drillers, 3–0	San Diego Padres	
2019	PCL	80–60	.571	3rd (tie)	2nd	4	—	—	—	Milwaukee Brewers	
2020	PCL	Season cancelled (COVID-19 pandemic)								Milwaukee Brewers	
2021	AAC	57–63	.475	8th	4th	7 1/2	—	—	—	San Diego Padres	
2022^	TL	68–68	.500	5th	2nd	5 1/2	0–2	.000	Won First-Half Southern Division title Lost Southern Division title vs. Frisco RoughRiders, 2–0	San Diego Padres	
2023^	TL	70–68	.507	4th (tie)	2nd (tie)	7	1–2	.333	Won First-Half Southern Division title Lost Southern Division title vs. Amarillo Sod Poodles, 2–1	San Diego Padres	
2024	TL	62–74	.456	7th	3rd	21	—	—	—	San Diego Padres	
2025	TL	65–72	.474	9th	4th	8 1/2	—	—	—	San Diego Padres	
Totals	—	3,821–3,977	.490	—	—	—	58–63	.479	—	—	—

== Rivals ==
The Missions' chief rival from 2005 to 2018 was the Corpus Christi Hooks. The teams contended to determine which is the better team of South Texas. The Missions were previously rivals with the Round Rock Express, but this was interrupted when the Express joined the PCL in 2005. The Missions and Express competed again in the PCL's American Conference Southern Division from 2019 to 2020.

== Signature promotions ==
Since 1989, during the seventh inning of each game, an auxiliary mascot named Henry the Puffy Taco is chased around the bases by a child from the stands, typically between 6 and 10 years of age. The kid tackles the giant taco to the ground just before reaching home plate (they start at first base), then poses triumphantly over the downed mascot. Henry has only won the race once, in 1992. In that race, Henry mistimed his steps and he inadvertently crossed home plate before his 10-year-old opponent. Nearly 20 years later the Missions hosted a rematch and, on June 24, 2010, the child finally avenged his loss.

The team has two unique giveaway nights—Shirt Off Your Back and Used Car Giveaway. In the first, often held on or near the last game of the season, the jerseys worn by the players during the game are raffled off to fans in the stands (raffle tickets are offered at no charge, and each fan is limited to one entry). The same raffle format is used for the Used Car Giveaway, where more than 10 used cars are given away throughout the night. In 2010, the prizes included a 2001 Ford Mustang and a 2001 Volvo S60.

== Former Missions with MLB experience ==
More than 700 former San Antonio baseball players have reached the major leagues, if only for a "cup of coffee". Some of the more notable players include:

- Adrián Beltré
- Shin-Soo Choo
- Alex Cora
- Cody Decker
- Luis Durango
- Dennis Eckersley
- Eric Gagne
- Dirk Hayhurst
- Chase Headley
- Félix Hernández
- Orel Hershiser
- Ken Hubbs
- Nick Hundley
- Adam Jones
- Eric Karros
- Sean Kazmar
- Corey Kluber
- Paul Konerko
- Mat Latos
- Ted Lilly
- Paul Lo Duca
- Jose Lopez
- Pedro Martínez
- Ramón Martínez
- Joe Morgan
- Jeff Newman
- Mike Piazza
- Aaron Poreda
- Daniel Robertson
- Brooks Robinson
- Fernando Tatis Jr.
- Fernando Valenzuela
- Will Venable
- John Wetteland

In addition, Brian Anderson—the former radio voice of the San Antonio Missions—has reached the big leagues as the broadcaster for the Milwaukee Brewers.

== Ballpark ==
The Missions play their home games at Nelson W. Wolff Municipal Stadium which opened in 1994. The ballpark seats more than 6,200 spectators and holds more than 9,000 people with additional outfield grass berm seating. The team has sought a new stadium since 2009, and continues to do so, though the team moved to the Triple-A Pacific Coast League in 2019.

Tickets for Missions games are priced on par with other minor league parks, ranging from $11 to $30 based on the section of the ballpark or $10 for berm seating.

== Roster ==
San Antonio Missions roster
Players	Coaches/Other
Pitchers: 16 Harry Gustin; 2 Jagger Haynes; -- Miguel Mendez; 5 Johan Moreno; 29 Ryan Och; 12 Cole Paplham; 9 Enmanuel Pinales; -- Fernando Sanchez; -- Jackson Smeltz; -- Andrew Thurman; 17 Eric Yost; Catchers: 4 Oswaldo Linares; -- Ethan Salas; 14 Christopher Sargent; 66 Andy Thomas ‡; Infielders: 28 Ryan Jackson; 26 Romeo Sanabria; -- Carson Tucker; -- Luis Verdugo; Outfielders: -- Albert Fabian; 31 Braedon Karpathios; 40 Joshua Mears; 1 Kai Murphy	Manager: -- Chris Tremie; Coaches: -- Erick Abreu (pitching); -- Brian Burres (bench); 44 Eric Del Prado (hitting); 60-day injured list: 3 Wyatt Hoffman; 7-day injured list; * On San Diego Padres 40-man roster; ~ Development list; # Rehab assignment; ∞ Reserve list; ‡ Restricted list; § Suspended list; † Temporarily inactive list; Roster updated March 25, 2026; Transactions; → More rosters: MiLB • Texas League; → San Diego Padres minor league players

== See also ==
- Religious symbolism in U.S. sports team names and mascots
