= Frank Gibson (baseball) =

American baseball player (1890–1961)

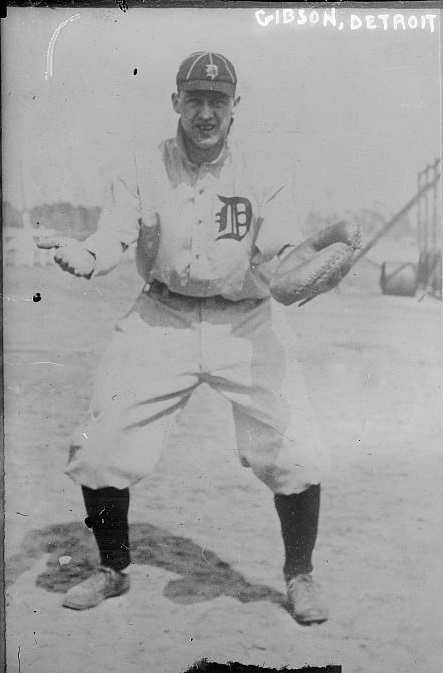
- Catcher
- Born: September 27, 1890; Omaha, Nebraska, U.S.
- Died: April 27, 1961 (aged 70); Austin, Texas, U.S.
- Batted: Switch Threw: Right

MLB debut
- April 22, 1913, for the Detroit Tigers

Last MLB appearance
- October 2, 1927, for the Boston Braves

MLB statistics
- Batting average: .274
- Home runs: 8
- Runs batted in: 146
- Stats at Baseball Reference

Teams
- Detroit Tigers (1913); Boston Braves (1921–1927)

Frank Gilbert Gibson (September 27, 1890 – April 27, 1961) was an American Major League Baseball catcher. He played all or part of eight seasons in the majors for the Detroit Tigers and Boston Braves.

Gibson began his professional career in 1911 with the Dallas Giants of the Texas League. After two seasons, he was picked up by the Tigers, making his major league debut with them in April 1913. He played in 23 games for the Tigers, batting just .140, with below average fielding. He also played in 87 games with the Nashville Vols of the Southern Association.

On May 5, 1914, the Tigers released Gibson and he rejoined Nashville.

After spending 1915 and 1916 with the Little Rock Travelers, he returned to the Texas League in 1917 with the Beaumont Oilers and San Antonio Bronchos.

Following four seasons with the Bronchos (renamed the Bears in 1919), Gibson was purchased from the team by the Boston Braves in August 1920. He made his return to the major leagues in 1921 after eight years away. For the next four seasons, Gibson served as backup for the Braves starting catcher, Mickey O'Neil. In 1925, Gibson was made the club's starting catcher, and he responded by batting .278 and driving in a career-high 50 runs.

Gibson's tenure as a starter would be brief, however, as the Braves acquired veteran catcher Zack Taylor during the next offseason. In 1927, Shanty Hogan took over the full-time job, and Gibson backed up both men. Following the 1927 season, Gibson was sold to the St. Louis Cardinals, but he never played for them. Instead, he returned to the Texas League in 1928, where he served as player-manager of the San Antonio Bears. He played three more seasons in the minor leagues, finishing his career with the minor league Baltimore Orioles in 1931
