= Texas–Southern League =

American sports league in minor league baseball

Texas-Southern League
- Sport: Baseball
- Founded: 1895
- Folded: 1899
- No. of teams: 8 (1895–1897); 6 (1898); 4 (1899)
- Country: United States
- Last champion: Galveston Sand Crabs (1899)
- Most titles: Galveston (1 1/2); Fort Worth Panthers (1); Houston Buffaloes (1); San Antonio Bronchos (1/2)

The Texas-Southern League was a sports league of minor league baseball teams that operated from 1895 to 1899, primarily in Texas. During the 1896 season, the league renamed itself as the Texas Association. History of the Texas-Southern League / Texas Association prior to 1900 follows.

== History ==
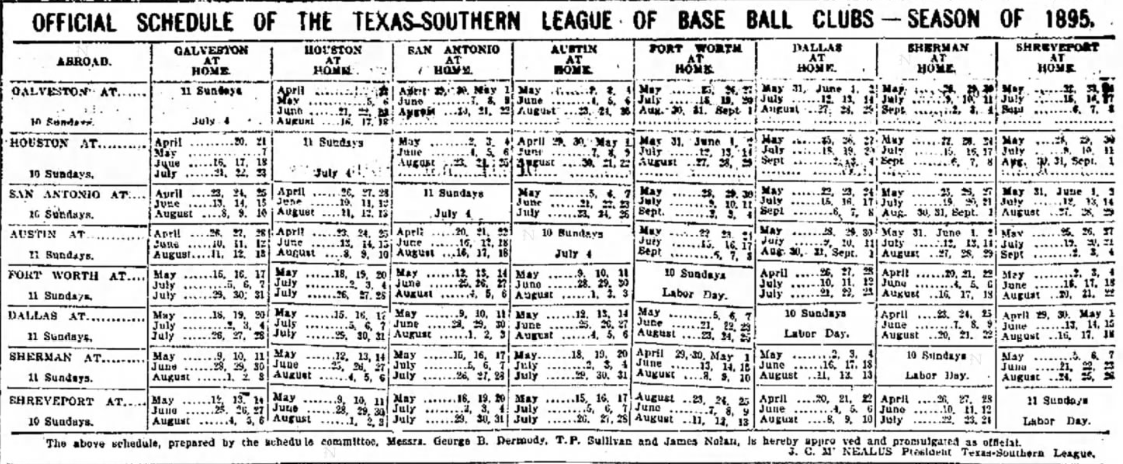
The league's inaugural schedule, as published in The Galveston Daily News on April 8, 1895

In 1895, the league began with eight teams: the Austin Senators, Dallas Steers, Fort Worth Panthers, Galveston Sand Crabs, Houston Magnolias, San Antonio Missionaries, Sherman Orphans, and Shreveport Grays. In early August, the Austin, Houston, and San Antonio teams disbanded; Shreveport also dropped out, so the league would have an even number of teams remaining. The league played a split season, with Dallas winning the first half, and Fort Worth winning the second half. In a postseason series, Fort Worth defeated Dallas, seven games to six.

In 1896, the league again began with eight teams: the returning Austin, Fort Worth, and Galveston teams were joined by the Dallas Navigators, Denison Indians, Houston Buffaloes, San Antonio Bronchos, and Sherman Students. The Students disbanded in June and were replaced by the Paris Midlands. In early August, four teams (Dallas, Denison, Fort Worth, and Paris) disbanded. The league played a three-part split season, with Fort Worth, Houston, and Galveston each winning segments. Fort Worth dropped out of the playoffs, leaving Houston to defeat Galveston for the championship, five games to two. Notable players in the league included Kid Elberfeld and Harry Steinfeldt.

The 1897 league consisted of eight teams: the returning Austin, Galveston, Houston, Paris, and San Antonio teams were joined by the Dallas Defenders, Fort Worth Colts, and Sherman-Denison Tigers. During July, the Sherman-Denison team moved to Waco, while Austin, San Antonio, and Houston dropped out of the league in August. The winners of the two split seasons, San Antonio and Galveston, were declared league co-champions. Notable players in the league included Warren Wallace Beckwith.

The 1898 league had six teams: the Austin, Galveston, Houston, and San Antonio teams were joined by the Dallas Colts and Fort Worth Panthers. At the end of April, Fort Worth disbanded and Dallas was dropped from the league, while in May, Austin and San Antonio disbanded. Austin and Galveston each won a half of the split-season, but no playoffs were held and no champion was declared.

In 1899, the final season of the league, four teams competed, all of which returned from the prior year: Austin, Galveston, Houston, and San Antonio. Galveston won both halves of the split season, and was declared league champion.

== Results by season ==
Season	League name	Teams	Class	Season dates	Split season winners	Playoffs
1895	Texas-Southern League	8	B	April 20–September 2	Dallas Steers; Fort Worth Panthers	Fort Worth over Dallas (7–6 games)
1896	Texas-Southern League; Texas Association†	8	C	April 18–September 5	Fort Worth Panthers; Houston Buffaloes; Galveston Sand Crabs	Houston over Galveston (5–2 games)
1897	Texas Association	8	C	April 17–August 22	San Antonio Bronchos; Galveston Sand Crabs	None held; Galveston & San Antonio co-champions
1898	Texas Association	6	C	April 9–May 16	Austin Senators; Galveston Sand Crabs	None held; no champion declared
1899	Texas Association	4	C	April 16–July 5	Galveston Sand Crabs; Galveston Sand Crabs	None held; Galveston champion

† Name changed during July

== Notes ==
Records from baseball's early years, especially in the minor leagues, are often incomplete, with frequent changes in team names and locations.

Some early seasons of the Texas League, which began operation in 1888, are listed as the Texas-Southern League in online sources.
