= Disch Field =

Baseball field in Austin, Texas, US

- Interactive map of Disch Field
- Full name: Disch Field
- Location: Austin, Texas
- Coordinates: 30.2613°N 97.7528°W
- Owner: Edmund P. Knebel
- Capacity: 5,500

Construction
- Opened: 1947
- Closed: 1967
- Cost: $250,000

Tenants
- Austin Pioneers (Big State League) (1947-1955); Austin Senators (Texas League) (1956-1964); Austin Braves (Texas League) (1965-1967)

Disch Field was a baseball field located in Austin, Texas, that opened in 1947 and hosted many minor league teams and playoff series. The diamond is at the present time part of the park behind The Long Center for the Performing Arts and the Palmer Events Complex between W. Riverside Drive and Barton Springs Road in South Austin, along the Colorado River. The park includes an open area called Willie Wells Field, named for the Austin-born Negro league baseball legend.

Disch Field was the first, followed by UFCU Disch-Falk Field, to be named after Billy Disch.

== Playoff appearances ==
The Austin teams were quite successful while they called Disch Field home. The Pioneers went to the playoffs in 1948, 1949, 1951, 1952, and 1954. The Pioneers finished as runners-up to the Tyler East Texans in 1952, winning their only playoff series in their history that year in the first round against the Temple Eagles, 4 games to 1.

The new version of the Senators finished as the runners-up to the Corpus Christi Giants in the championship series in 1958 and won the Texas League crown in 1959.

The Austin Braves went to the playoffs every year from 1965 to 1967, and the Braves won the Texas League crown in 1966.

== The Unlikeliest Hitting Machine-The Pitcher ==
On April 27, 1966, Austin Braves pitcher Pat House went 3-for-6 with two doubles and one single with eight RBIs. He also pitched a complete game giving up ten hits, four earned runs, striking out nine, and allowed one base on balls.

== Sources ==
- "Baseball in the Lone Star State: Texas League's Greatest Hits," Tom Kayser and David King, Trinity University Press 2005
- "Texas Almanac 2008-2009," The Dallas Morning News, c.2008
- "The Texas League 1888-1987: A Century of Baseball," Bill O'Neal, c.1987
