= Texas Collegiate Hockey Conference =

College ice hockey conference

Texas Collegiate Hockey Conference (TCHC)
- Conference: ACHA
- Founded: 2016
- Commissioner: Michael Authier
- Sports fielded: Men's ice hockey
- Division: Division II
- No. of teams: 9
- Region: Texas
- Most recent champions: UT Longhorns (1st title)
- Most titles: 2 titles each: UTEP Miners; Texas A&M Aggies
- Website: Official website

The Texas Collegiate Hockey Conference (TCHC) is a college ice hockey conference within the American Collegiate Hockey Association that plays at the Division II level. All eight members schools are universities located within the state of Texas.

== History ==
The TCHC was formed in 2016 with the original members consisting of Texas A&M, the University of Texas, the University of Texas at El Paso, Texas State, Texas Christian University, Dallas Baptist University, Texas Tech and the University of North Texas.

The conference currently competes within the ACHA Division II West Region, with the league champion earning an automatic bid to the ACHA Division II regional tournament.

== Members ==
School	Location	Founded	Joined	Affiliation	Nickname	Colors	Website
Baylor University	Waco, TX	1845	2022	Private (Baptist)	Bears		
East Texas Baptist University	Marshall, TX	1912	2016	Private (Baptist)	Tigers		
University of North Texas	Denton, TX	1890	2016	Public (University of North Texas System)	Mean Green		
Southern Methodist University	Dallas, TX	1911	2021	Private (United Methodist Church)	Mustangs		
Texas Christian University	Fort Worth, TX	1873	2016	Private (Christian Church (Disciples of Christ))	Horned Frogs		
University of Texas	Austin, TX	1883	2016	Public (University of Texas System)	Longhorns		
Texas A&M University	College Station, TX	1876	2016	Public (Texas A&M University System)	Aggies		
Texas State University	San Marcos, TX	1899	2016	Public (Texas State University System)	Bobcats		
University of Texas at San Antonio	San Antonio, TX	1969	2026	Public (University of Texas System)	Runners		

== Former Members ==
- Dallas Baptist University
- University of Texas, El Paso
- Oklahoma State University
- Texas Tech University

== Year-by-year ==
Past Champions
Season	Regular season	Playoff	Runner-up	Score	Location
2016–17	UTEP	UTEP	Dallas Baptist	6–0	El Paso
2017–18	Texas	North Texas	Texas	5–3	Austin
2018–19	UTEP	UTEP	Texas A&M	8–1	Dallas
2019–20	East Texas Baptist	Texas A&M	Dallas Baptist	5–3	Mansfield
2021–22	East Texas Baptist	Texas A&M	East Texas Baptist	5–4	Mansfield
2022–23	East Texas Baptist	East Texas Baptist	Texas A&M	3–2 (SO)	Mansfield
2023–24	SMU	SMU	TCU	6–4	Farmers Branch
2024-25	Texas	TCU	Texas A&M	7–6 (OT)	Farmers Branch
2025-2026	Texas A&M	Texas	TCU	6-4	Farmers Branch

== See also ==
- American Collegiate Hockey Association
