= San Antonio Missionaries =

The San Antonio Missionaries were a Texas League and Texas-Southern League minor league baseball team based in the United States city of San Antonio, Texas that played in 1888 and from 1895 to 1896. The team was one of the first professional baseball teams from San Antonio.
