= Muth's Park =

19th-century baseball park in San Antonio, Texas

Muth's Park was a baseball park located in San Antonio, Texas, United States. The park, located near Fort Sam Houston, was the first host for professional baseball in the city.

It was the home of the Texas League San Antonio Missionaries in 1888.
