= Tech Field (San Antonio) =

Baseball stadium in San Antonio, Texas, US

- Location: N Flores, bounded by Evergreen/Jackson Streets, San Antonio, Texas
- Surface: Grass

Construction
- Built: 1921
- Demolished: 1946

Tenants
- San Antonio Missions (TL) (1932–1942, 1946); Pittsburgh Pirates (NL) (1936); St. Louis Browns (AL) (1937–1941); Fox Tech High School (1921–1946)

Tech Field was a baseball stadium, located in San Antonio, Texas, from 1921 until 1946. It served as the home of the San Antonio Missions of the Texas League. It also served as the spring training site of the Pittsburgh Pirates in 1936 and the St. Louis Browns from 1937 to 1941. The field belonged to Fox Tech High School.

The Missions team moved to Tech Field after a June 18, 1932, fire destroyed the club's former home at League Park. The Missions then were affiliated with the St. Louis Browns, which had made some moves in the late 1930s toward buying the property. The Browns front office passed when offered the opportunity again, months before the city school district decided to sell it to the San Antonio Transit Company, forerunner of VIA Metropolitan Transit, for $160,000. Alamo Stadium, then opened in 1940 and become the chief venue for high school football. Tech Field was deem non-essential to the school district. The Missions were allowed to play there for a final season in 1946, before the field was demolished.
