= Riverside Park (Austin) =

Ballpark in Austin, Texas, US

Coordinates: 30.2605°N 97.7474°W

Riverside Park was a ballpark located in Austin, Texas, and was the home to many Austin teams starting in 1888 when the Austin Hix, the city's initial baseball team, combined with the Austin Red Sox to exist as the first edition of the Austin Senators. The ballpark was located southeast of Congress Avenue Bridge.

== Sources ==
- "San Antonio at Bat: Professional Baseball in the Alamo City," David King, c.2004
- "Baseball in the Lone Star State: Texas League's Greatest Hits," Tom Kayser and David King, Trinity University Press 2005
