= San Antonio Indians =

The San Antonio Indians were a minor league baseball team based in San Antonio, Texas, that played from 1929 to 1932 in the Texas League. They played their home games at League Park. Notable players include Ray Grimes, Wilbur Cooper, Sam Leslie, Jack Mealey, Jo-Jo Moore, and Pinky Higgins.

== Season records ==
| Season | Class | Record | Pct. | League finish | GB | Manager | Ref. |
|---|---|---|---|---|---|---|---|
| 1929 | A | 56–106 | .346 | 8th | 39.5 | William Alexander; Pat Newnam | |
| 1930 | A | 60–93 | .392 | 7th | 35 | George Burns | |
| 1931 | A | 66–94 | .413 | 6th (t) | 42.5 | Claude Robertson | |
| 1932 | A | 57–91 | .385 | 7th | 41.5 | Claude Robertson | |

== See also ==
- Category:San Antonio Indians players
- San Antonio Bears (preceding Texas League team)
- San Antonio Missions (succeeding Texas League team)
