= V. J. Keefe Memorial Stadium =

Stadium in San Antonio, Texas, US

- Interactive map of V. J. Keefe Memorial Stadium
- Full name: V. J. Keefe Memorial Stadium
- Location: San Antonio, Texas; United States
- Coordinates: 29.452762°N 98.567051°W
- Owner: St. Mary's University
- Operator: St. Mary's University
- Capacity: 3,500

Construction
- Opened: 1960

Tenants
- San Antonio Missions (TL) (1968–1993); San Antonio Tejanos (TLL) (1994)

V. J. Keefe Memorial Stadium was a multi-purpose stadium in San Antonio, Texas, United States. It was initially used as the stadium of San Antonio Missions games. It was replaced by Nelson W. Wolff Municipal Stadium for the Missions in 1994. The stadium opened in 1960 and had a final capacity 3,500 spectators.

The stadium was located on the campus of St. Mary's University and continued to be used by the school's baseball team until 2013. It was replaced by Dickson Stadium, which was built upon the steel structure of the old venue. Dickson Stadium presently seats 2,260, with additional berm seating.
