= Mission Stadium =

Stadium in San Antonio, Texas

Coordinates: 29°23′37″N 98°29′26″W

- Interactive map of Mission Stadium
- Full name: Mission Stadium
- Location: San Antonio, Texas; United States
- Owner: San Antonio Missions
- Operator: San Antonio Missions
- Capacity: 10,000

Construction
- Opened: 1947
- Closed: 1964

Tenant
- San Antonio Missions (1947–1964)

Mission Stadium was a multi-purpose stadium in San Antonio, Texas, United States. It was opened in 1947, as the stadium of the San Antonio Missions of the Texas League. Its final season was in 1964; V. J. Keefe Memorial Stadium replaced it in 1968 when minor league baseball returned to San Antonio. The capacity of the stadium was 10,000 spectators.

The ballpark was bounded by Mission Road (west and north, third base and left field); Mitchell Street (south, first base); and Steves Avenue (north and east, center field and right field). The site is currently a parking lot for an office complex, whose curvature near the streetcorner approximates the curvature of the old grandstand.

== Sources ==
- "https://www.milb.com/san-antonio/ballpark/wolff-stadium
