= San Antonio Bronchos =

The San Antonio Bronchos were a minor league baseball team based in San Antonio, Texas, that played in the South Texas League (1903–1906) and Texas League (1907–1919). The team was also known as the Mustangs (1903–04), Warriors (1905), and Aces (1919).

The team won two league championships. The first was in the South Texas League in their inaugural season of 1903, under the guidance of manager Wade Moore. They won their second in 1908, while a member of the Texas League under managers George Leidy and Pat Newnam.

On July 23, 1907, the Bronchos lost a game played to the Austin Senators at Riverside Park in Austin by a 44–0 score, when they made a farce of the second game of a doubleheader, after forfeiting the first game over disagreements with the umpire.

== Season records ==
South Texas League

Season	Class	Record	Pct.	League finish	GB/GA	Manager	Ref.
1903	D	70–54	.565	1st	+3.5	Wade Moore	
1904	C†	32–88	.267	4th	47.5	Wade Moore [https://www.baseball-reference.com/register/player.,Ellis Hardy,Ike Pendleton,Dit Spencer,Henry Pollock	
1905	C	68–61	.527	2nd	17	William Morrow; Walter Morris; George Page	
1906	C	57–70	.449	5th	24	William Morrow; William Alexander; George Page	

† In 1904, the league started as Class D, then became Class C on June 15.

Texas League

Season	Class	Record	Pct.	League finish	GB/GA	Manager	Ref.
1907	C	82–58	.586	3rd	6.5	Sam LaRocque; Pat Newnam	
1908	C	95–48	.664	1st	+6	George Leidy; Pat Newnam	
1909	C	76–63	.547	3rd	8	George Leidy	
1910	C	74–62	.544	3rd (t)	7	George Leidy	
1911	B	77–68	.531	3rd	6.5	George Leidy	
1912	B	84–57	.596	2nd	4	George Leidy; Frank Metz	
1913	B	74–78	.487	4th	20	George Stinson	
1914	B	46–103	.309	7th	54.5	Clyde Goodwin; Dred Cavender; John Thomas Kibler	
1915	B	81–67	.547	2nd	6.5	George Leidy	
1916	B	66–79	.455	6th (t)	19	George Leidy; Jack Love; Dolly Stark; Harry Stewart	
1917	B	76–89	.461	5th	22.5	Charley O'Leary; Clay Perry	
1918	B	43–45†	.489	4th	8.5	Clay Perry	
1919	B	60–89	.403	8th	31.5	Michael Finn	

† In 1918, the league suspended operations on July 7.

=== League leaders ===
- 1903: Orth Thomas – wins (22)
- 1905: Earle Gardner – average (.306)
- 1908: Edward Conrad Collins – runs (113)
- 1909: Fred Winchell – strikeouts (264)
- 1910: Otto McIvor – runs (87); George Stinson – home runs (11, tied); Harry Ables – strikeouts (325)
- 1911: Frank Metz – home runs (22)
- 1912: Frank Metz – average (.323), hits (171), home runs (21)
- 1913: Dave Davenport – strikeouts (204, tied)
- 1915: Emmett Munsell – wins (25)
- 1916: John Baggan – runs (90, tied)
- 1917: John Baggan – runs (102); Roy Leslie – home runs (18)

== See also ==
- Category:San Antonio Bronchos players
- San Antonio Bears (succeeding Texas League team)
