= Nelson W. Wolff Municipal Stadium =

Baseball stadium in San Antonio, Texas

- The Wolff

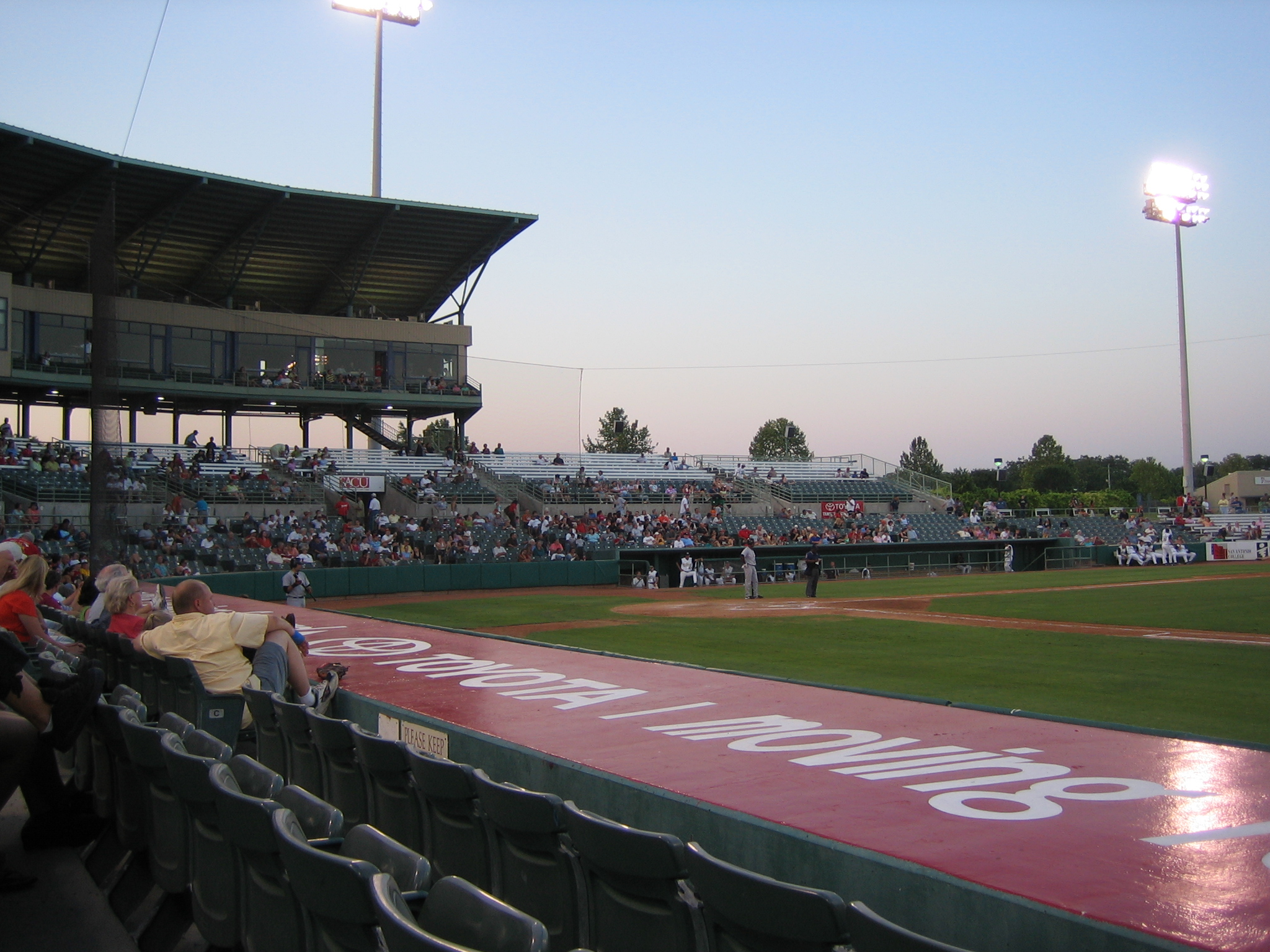

- Location within Texas Location within the United States
- Former names: San Antonio Municipal Stadium (1994–1995)
- Location: 5757 West US Highway 90; San Antonio, Texas; United States
- Coordinates: 29°24′32.87″N 98°36′4.01″W
- Owner: City of San Antonio
- Operator: Elmore Sports Group
- Capacity: 9,200
- Surface: Grass
- Scoreboard: 16 by 22 ft (4.9 by 6.7 m) LED video screen
- Field size: Left field: 310 feet (94 m); Center field: 402 feet (123 m); Right field: 340 feet (100 m)

Construction
- Groundbreaking: September 5, 1993
- Opened: April 18, 1994
- Cost: $10.5 million ($22.8 million in 2025 dollars)
- Architects: HOK Sport; Ford, Powell & Carson
- Services engineers: Jasmine Engineering, Inc.
- General contractor: Lyda/Bartlett Cocke

Tenant
- San Antonio Missions (TL/PCL) 1994–present

Nelson W. Wolff Municipal Stadium (informally Wolff Stadium) is a ballpark in San Antonio, Texas. It is the home of the San Antonio Missions, a Minor League Baseball team in the Texas League. The UTSA Roadrunners baseball team also plays various home games at the stadium. The stadium is named for Bexar County Judge Nelson Wolff, who is a former Texas legislator and San Antonio councilman and mayor.

The Wolff is located about 8 miles (13 km) to the west of downtown San Antonio. It was opened on April 18, 1994, (as the San Antonio Municipal Stadium) and has 6,200 fixed seats and a grass berm in left field that can seat about 3,000. The stadium features 14 luxury suites, a 500-person picnic area down the right field line, and an all-you-can-eat fiesta deck that can be rented for groups of 25 to 200 people. The dimensions (from home plate to the outfield wall) are: 310 feet (94 m) to left field, 402 feet (123 m) to center field, and 340 feet (100 m) to right field.

== Features ==
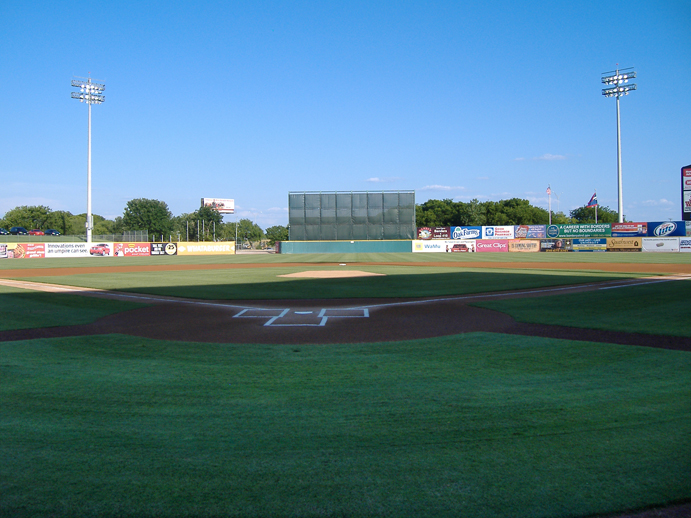
The playing field

Viewing the stadium from the outside entrance (behind home plate) there are two large brick bell towers, in keeping with a southwestern theme, and echoing an architectural feature of the old Mission Stadium. Shaded seating in the stadium can be found in the Infield Reserved section 200–208 in the back 6 rows. There are no poles to impede views as seen in some older minor league parks. A concourse wraps around the playing field and provides spectators varied views of the game and stadium.

The section behind home plate has individual seats; the left and right field seating areas, however, are entirely made up of bleachers.

Planes can often be seen flying into and out of Lackland Air Force Base behind the outfield wall. The Missions regularly have "Military Night", inviting recently graduated troops to Friday night games.

== Notable events ==
On July 7, 1997, the ballpark hosted the Double-A All-Star Game in which a team of American League-affiliated All-Stars defeated a team of National League-affiliated All-Stars, 4–0, before 7,114 people in attendance.

Wolff Stadium hosted the 2011 Texas League All-Star Game.

The third annual Mala Luna Music Festival was held from October 27–28, 2018, in the parking lot outside of the stadium.

In April 2021, the stadium was announced as the site for two Mexican League exhibition games, between Tecolotes de los Dos Laredos and the Acereros de Monclova.

== Stadium upgrades ==
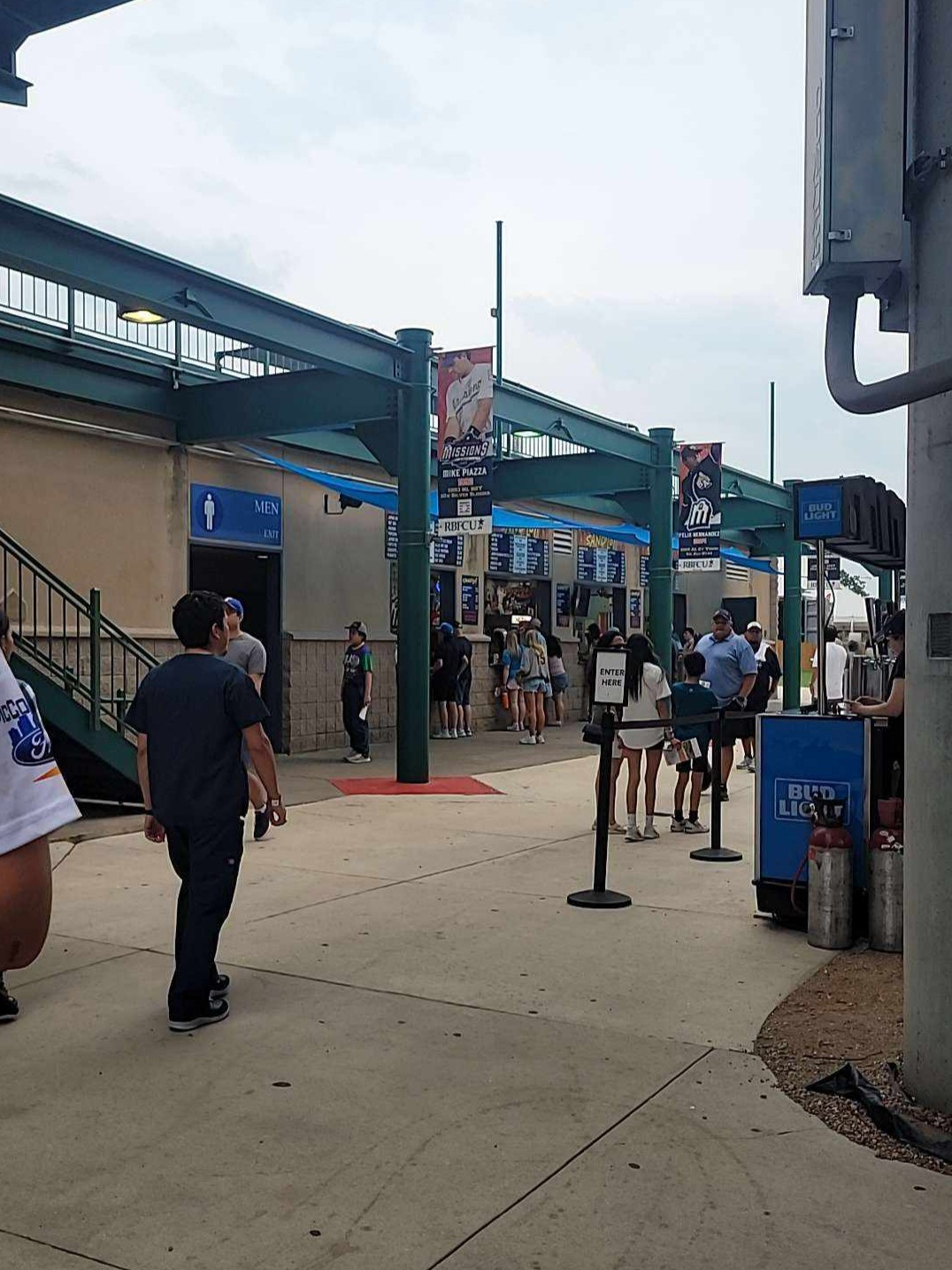
Concession stands

Following the 2006 season, the City of San Antonio approved a revised lease of Wolff Stadium. The San Antonio Missions took control of the stadium with plans to invest $1.2 million to improving the concession areas, create a "fiesta deck" in left field, improve the sound system, replace the scoreboard in right field with an LED one, and repaint. In addition, the city invested $300,000 for new lighting. The lease called for the Missions to spend 10 years in the stadium, with three additional options of five years each.
