= San Antonio Bears =

Minor league baseball team in San Antonio, Texas

The San Antonio Bears were a minor league baseball team located in San Antonio, Texas. The Bears played in the Texas League from 1920 through 1928. Their home stadium was League Park.

== Season records ==
Season	Class	Record	Pct.	League finish	GB	Manager	Ref.
1920	B	79–71	.527	5th	30	John Nee	
1921	A	60–98	.380	8th	47	John Nee	
1922	A	76–79	.490	5th	33	Hub Northen	
1923	A	81–68	.544	2nd	13.5	Bob Coleman	
1924	A	75–75	.500	5th	34	Bob Coleman	
1925	A	81–64	.559	4th	19	Bob Coleman	
1926	A	86–70	.551	2nd	3.5	Honus Mitze	
1927	A	65–90	.419	7th	36.5	Honus Mitze; Bob Couchman & Ray Flaskamper	Bob Couchman sole manager from August 8
1928	A	76–83	.478	5th	18.5	Frank Gibson	

=== League leaders ===
- 1920: Ed Brown – hits (200)
- 1923: Ike Boone – average (.402), runs (134), hits (241), RBIs (135)
- 1925: Danny Clark – average (.399), hits (225)
- 1926: Homer "Tiny" Owens – wins (22, tied)

== See also ==
- Category:San Antonio Bears players
- San Antonio Bronchos (preceding Texas League team)
- San Antonio Indians (succeeding Texas League team)
