= League Park (San Antonio) =

Stadium in San Antonio, Texas, U.S.

League Park was a stadium in San Antonio, Texas. It was primarily used for baseball and was the home of minor league San Antonio Bears and Indians.

== History ==
The ballpark was used from 1925 through 1932. It was located at East Josephine and Isleta streets near Brackenridge Park Golf Course, and had a capacity of 6,000 people. It hosted its first night game on July 24, 1930, with 3,400 in attendance. It burned down on June 18, 1932, after a fire started in the clubhouse.

League Park was used for spring training by the Boston Red Sox in 1924, and hosted Babe Ruth and the New York Yankees in a preseason game on March 31, 1930.

A different ballpark in San Antonio, Block Stadium, was used from 1913 through 1924; it was also known as "League Park" beginning in 1915.

== Sources ==
- "Baseball in the Lone Star State: Texas League's Greatest Hits," Tom Kayser and David King, Trinity University Press 2005
