= Durant Choctaws =

- 1912–1913; (1911–1914); Durant, Oklahoma

Minor league affiliations
- Class: Class D (1911–1914)
- League: Texas–Oklahoma League (1911–1914)

Major league affiliations
- Team: None

Minor league titles
- League titles (0): None
- Wild card berths (0): None

Team data
- Name: Durant Educators (1911); Durant Choctaws (1912–1913); Durant Gladiators (1914)
- Ballpark: Durant Base Ball Park (1911–1914)

The Durant Choctaws were a minor league baseball team based in Durant, Oklahoma. Durant played as members of the Class D level Texas–Oklahoma League from 1911 to 1914. The Durant Educators (1911), Durant Choctaws (1912–1913) and Durant Gladiators (1914) teams played exclusively in the Texas-Oklahoma League, hosting home minor league games at the Durant Base Ball Park.

After placing second in their first season of play, Durant finished in last place during the next three seasons, before the league folded following the 1914 season, during World War I.

== History ==
In 1911, the Durant Educators became a charter member of the eight–team, Class D level Texas–Oklahoma League. The Educators joined the Altus Chiefs, Bonham Boosters, Ardmore Blues, Cleburne Railroaders, Gainesville Blue Ribbons, Lawton Medicine Men and Wichita Falls Irish Lads in beginning Texas–Oklahoma League play on April 25, 1911.

The Altus Chiefs, (31–44), Gainesville Blue Ribbons (19–30) and Lawton Medicine Men (17–31) all folded before completing the season. In the final league overall standings, the Wichita Falls Irish Lads (65–38) led the league, followed by the second place Durant Educators (65–46), Cleburne Railroaders (61–50), Bonham Boosters (54–60) and Ardmore Blues (49–58). Wichita Falls won the first half title and Cleburne won the second half title. In the playoffs, Wichita Falls refused to play game four after a financial dispute and Cleburne was awarded the championship.

The Texas–Oklahoma League began the 1912 season as an eight-team league, which was reduced to six teams when the Greenville Highlanders and McKinney teams folded during the season. The Durant "Choctaws" (also referred to as the "Hustlers" in 1912) ended the Texas–Oklahoma League season with a record of 26–64, placing sixth and finishing 36.0 games behind the first place Ardmore Giants. Hetty Green, Allie Mitchell, Charlie Dierdoff and Bill Harper served as managers in 1912, as Durant finished in last place for the first of three consecutive seasons.

The "Choctaws" nickname corresponds to Durant local history. The city of Durant was founded by Dixon Durant, who was French–Choctaw. Today, Durant serves as the capital of the Choctaw Nation of Oklahoma.

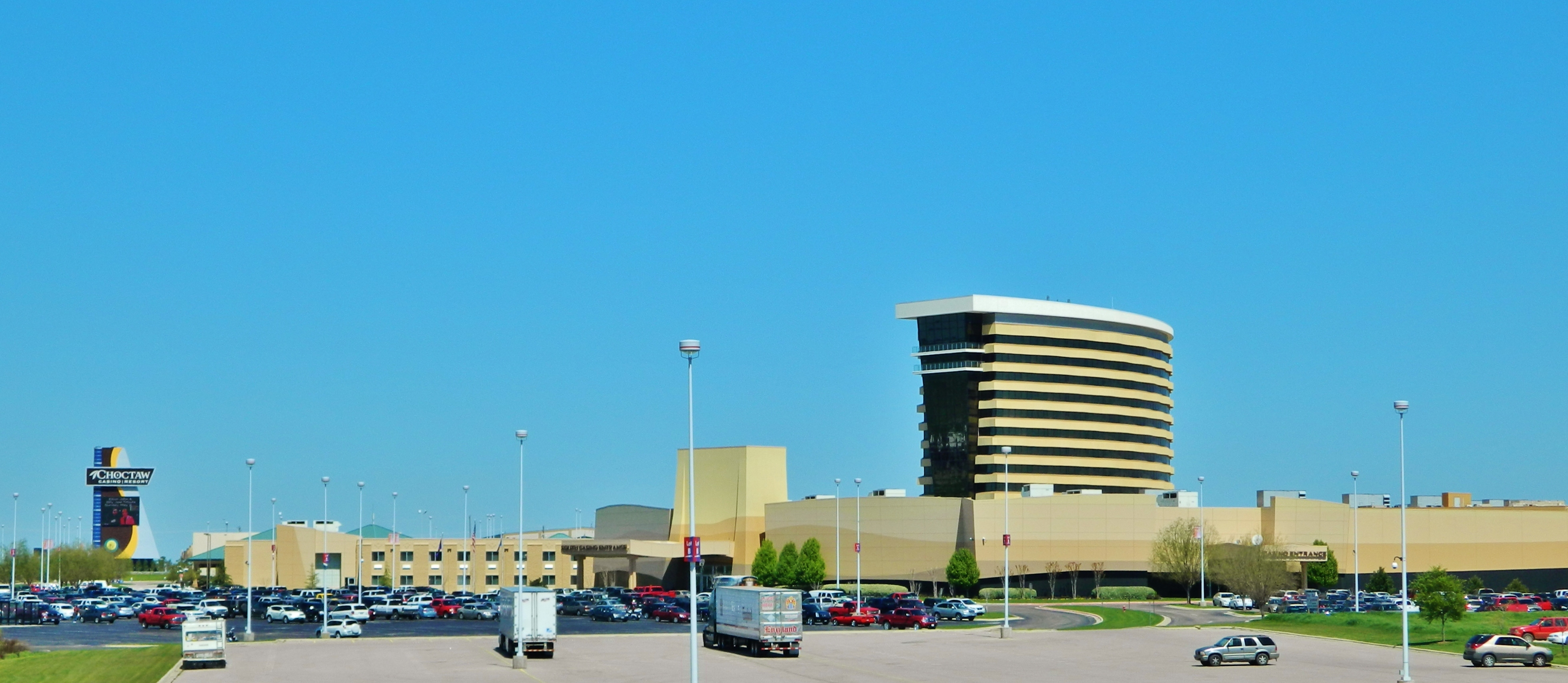
(2012) Choctaw Casino Resort. Durant, Oklahoma

The Texas–Oklahoma League remained intact as an eight–team league during the 1913 season, with the Durant Choctaws finishing last for the second consecutive season. Durant ended the regular season with a record of 41–84, placing eighth. Kid Speer and Stoney Jewell were the Choctaws managers, as Durant finished 43.0 games behind the first place Denison Blue Sox.

In their final season, the 1914 Durant "Gladiators" continued play, as the Texas–Oklahoma League began the season as an eight–team league. After the Bonham Sliders, Hugo Scouts, Sherman Lions and Ardmore Indians folded during the season, the league was left with four remaining teams. Durant completed the season schedule with the Texarkana Tigers, Paris Boosters and Denison Champions teams and finished last for the third consecutive season. The Gladiators ended the Texas–Oklahoma League regular season with a record of 46–73, to place fourth. Fred Morris and Bert Humphries served as managers, as Durant finished 32.5 games behind the first place Paris Snappers.

The Texas–Oklahoma League folded following the 1914 season, with World War I underway. Durant Educators and Durant Choctaws player Calvin Bryant fought in World War I for the U.S. Army. Bryant was killed in action in France on November 11, 1918. The Texas–Oklahoma League resumed play in 1921, without a Durant franchise. Durant has not hosted another minor league team.

== The ballpark ==
The Durant teams hosted home games at the Durant Base Ball Park. The ballpark was located on the blocks of North 1st Avenue (3B), West Cedar (1B), Katy Avenue (RF) & West Elm. Today, the square block is residential and commercial property.

== Timeline ==
Year(s)	# Yrs.	Team	Level	League	Ballpark
1911	1	Durant Educators	Class D	Texas-Oklahoma League	Durant Base Ball Park
1912-1913	2	Durant Choctaws	Class D	Texas-Oklahoma League	Durant Base Ball Park
1914	1	Durant Gladiators	Class D	Texas-Oklahoma League	Durant Base Ball Park

== Year–by–year records ==
Year	Record	Finish	Manager	Playoffs/Notes
1911	65–46	2nd	Joe Connor / Ben Brownlow / Hetty Green / W.W. Washington	No playoffs held
1912	26–64	6th	Hetty Green / Allie Mitchell / Charlie Dierdoff / Bill Harper	No playoffs held
1913	42–84	8th	Stoney Jewell / Kid Speer	No playoffs held
1914	46–73	4th	Fred Morris and Bert Humphries	No playoffs held

== Notable alumni ==
- Joe Connor (1911, MGR)
- Bert Humphries (1914, MGR)
- Kid Speer (1913, MGR)
- Durant Educators and Durant Choctaws player Calvin Bryant was killed in World War I. Bryant died fighting for the U.S. Army in France on November 11, 1918.
