= Texarkana Tigers =

Minor league baseball team in Arkansas

- 1913–1914; Texarkana, Arkansas

Minor league affiliations
- Class: Class D (1913–1914)
- League: Texas-Oklahoma League (1913–1914)

Major league affiliations
- Team: None

Minor league titles
- League titles (1): 1914
- Conference titles (1): 1914

Team data
- Name: Texarkana Tigers (1913–1914)
- Ballpark: Texas League Park (1913–1914)

The Texarkana Tigers were a minor league baseball team based in Texarkana, Arkansas. In 1913 and 1914, the Tigers played as members of the eight-team Class D level Texas-Oklahoma League, winning the 1914 league championship in the final season of the league.

The Texarkana Tigers hosted minor league home games at Texas League Park, which was opened in 1905.

== History ==
Minor league baseball began in Texarkana in 1897, when the Texarkana Nobles played as a member of the Independent level Arkansas State League. The Tigers were immediately preceded by the 1912 Texarkana Twins, who played the season as members of the Class D level South Central League. The Central League folded following the 1912 season.

In 1913, Texarkana continued minor league play in a new league, when the Texarkana "Tigers" became members of the eight-team Class D level Texas-Oklahoma League. The Bonham Blues, Denison Blue Sox, Durant Choctaws, Paris Boosters, Sherman Lions and Wichita Falls Drillers teams joined Texarkana in beginning league play on April 15, 1913.

In their first season of play, the 1913 Texarkana Tigers placed third in the Texas–Oklahoma League final standings. With a 73–53 record, the Tiger's managers were Dee Poindexter and Al Ritter. The Tigers finished 11½ games behind the first-place Denison Blue Sox in the final standings of the eight-team league. No playoffs were held. Pitcher Joe Pate of Texarkana led the Texas–Oklahoma League with 23 wins.

On opening day, April 15, 1913, Texarkana played at the Bonham Blues, who opened their new baseball park that day. Bonham won the opener by the score of 3–0.

Texarkana won both the 1914 Texas–Oklahoma League pennant and the overall championship. In the regular season, Tigers had a 79–41 record under manager Al Ritter and ended the season in a virtual tie for first place with the 77–39 Paris Snappers. The two teams then played a playoff series, with the Tigers winning the championship series 3 games to 1. Bill Stellbauer of Texarkana won the Texas–Oklahoma League batting title, hitting .351. Teammate Harry O'Neill hit 7 home runs to lead the league.

The Texas–Oklahoma League folded after the 1914 season. The league reformed in 1921 without a Texarkana franchise. Texarkana next hosted minor league baseball when the 1924 Texarkana Twins began play as members of the Class D level East Texas League.

== The ballpark ==
The Texarkana Tigers hosted home minor league games at Texas League Park. The ballpark was built in 1905 for the Texarkana team that played one season in the Texas League.

== Timeline ==
Year(s)	# Yrs.	Team	Level	League	Ballpark
1913–1914	2	Texarkana Tigers	Class D	Texas-Oklahoma League	Texas League Park

== Year–by–year records ==
Year	Record	Finish	Manager	Playoffs/Notes
1913	73–53	3rd	Dee Poindexter / Al Ritter	No playoffs held
1914	79–41	1st (tie)	Al Ritter	League champions

== Notable alumni ==
- Horace Milan (1913–1914)
- Ray O'Brien (1914)
- Joe Pate (1913–1914)
- Bill Stellbauer (1914)
- Cotton Tierney (1914)

== See also ==
- Texarkana Tigers players
