= Cleburne Generals =

- 1921–1922; Cleburne, Texas

Minor league affiliations
- Class: Class D (1921–1922)
- League: Texas-Oklahoma League (1921–1922)

Major league affiliations
- Team: None

Minor league titles
- League titles (0): None

Team data
- Name: Cleburne Generals (1921-1922)
- Ballpark: Gorman's Park (1921-1922)

The Cleburne Generals were a minor league baseball team based in Cleburne, Texas. In 1921 and 1922, the Generals played as members of the Class D level Texas-Oklahoma League. The "Generals" nickname corresponds to the namesake of Cleburne, General Patrick Cleburne.

The Cleburne Generals hosted minor league home games at Gorman's Park, still in use and known today as Hulen Park.

== History ==
The 1906 Cleburne Railroaders played the season as members of the Class D level Texas League, with Baseball Hall of Fame charter member Tris Speaker on the roster. The Generals were immediately preceded in Texas-Oklahoma League play by the 1911 Cleburne Railroaders, who resumed play as members of the Class D level league. In the 1911 league playoffs, the Wichita Falls Irish Lads were leading Cleburne two games to one, when Wichita Falls refused to player eligibility and financial disputes. Cleburne was declared as the league champion. Cleburne did not return to play in the 1912 Texas-Oklahoma League, with the Railroaders playing the 1912 season as members of the Class D level South Central League and folding during the season.

The 1921 Cleburne Generals joined the reformed six-team, Class D level Texas-Oklahoma League. The Ardmore Peps, Bonham Favorites, Graham Hijackers, Paris Snappers and Sherman Lions joined Cleburne in beginning league play on April 26, 1921.

The "Generals" nickname for the team corresponds to local history. The city is named after General Patrick Cleburne, an American Civil War General and the city site was founded during the Civil War.

The Generals ended the 1921 season with a record of 51–75, playing under Managers M.H. Robertson and F. Hopper. Cleburne placed fourth in the league standings, finishing 35.0 games behind the first place Ardmore Peps in the final standings, as the league held no playoffs. Cleburne joined the Ardmore Peps (87–40), Bonham Boosters, Graham Hijackers/Mineral Wells Resorters (49–79), Paris Snappers and Sherman Lions (48–78) in the 1921 league standings.

1922 was the final year for both the Texas–Oklahoma League and the Cleburne Generals, as neither the team nor the league lasted through the season. On July 22, 1922, the Cleburne Generals had a record of 36–58, when the team was dropped from the league, with the Bonham Bingers franchise disbanding on the same day. The 1922 Texas–Oklahoma League season ended on August 6, 1922, with National Association permission, due to a railroad strike. The league did not reform in 1923 and permanently disbanded. The 1922 team is also referred to as the "Scouts."

Cleburne, Texas was without minor league baseball until 2017, when the Cleburne "Railroaders" team was formed and became members of the independent American Association of Professional Baseball, where they continue play today.

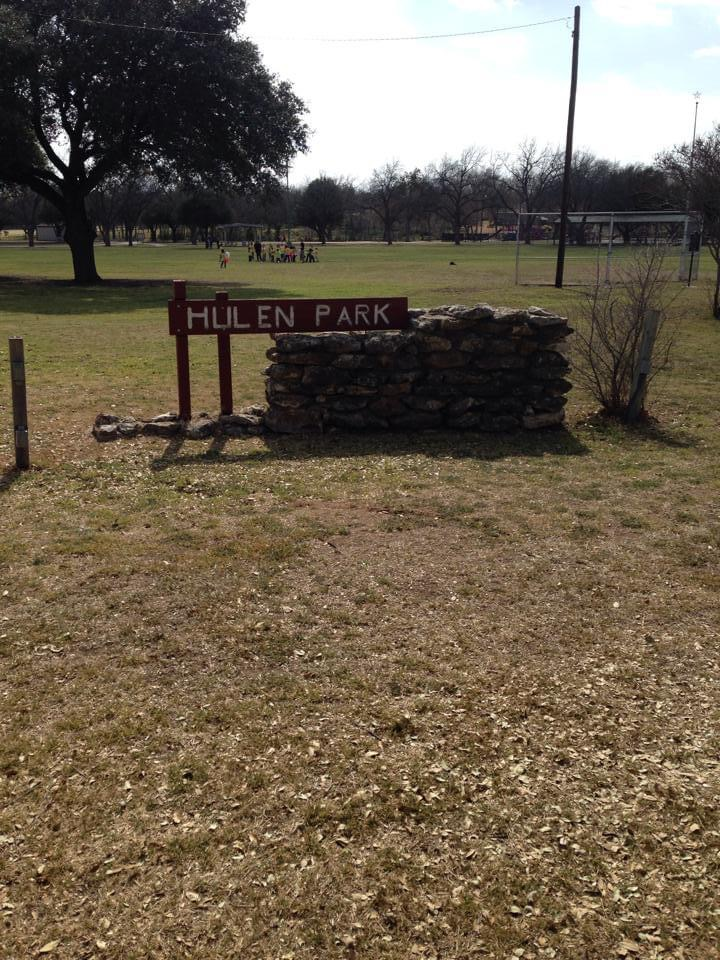
(2014) Hulen Park. Cleburne, Texas

== The ballpark ==
The Cleburne Generals hosted minor league home games at Gorman's Park. The ballpark site is still in use today as a public park, with a ballfield. The park has been renamed to Hulen Park. The park is located at 301 West Westhill Drive in Cleburne.

== Timeline ==
Year(s)	# Yrs.	Team	Level	League	Ballpark
1921-1922	2	Cleburne Generals	Class D	Texas-Oklahoma League	Gorman's Park

== Year–by–year records ==
Year	Record	Finish	Manager	Playoffs/Notes
1921	51–75	4th	M.H. Robertson/ F. Hopper	No playoffs held
1922	36–58	8th	Lindy Hiett	Team folded July 22; League folded August 6

== Notable alumni ==
- Ed Appleton (1922)
- Dusty Boggess (1922)

== See also ==
- Cleburne Generals/Scouts players
