= Hugo Scouts =

- 1913–1914; Hugo, Oklahoma

Minor league affiliations
- Class: Class D (1913–1914)
- League: Texas-Oklahoma League (1913–1914)

Major league affiliations
- Team: None

Minor league titles
- League titles (0): None

Team data
- Name: Hugo Hugoites (1913); Hugo Scouts (1914)
- Ballpark: Ansley Park (1913–1914)

The Hugo Scouts were a minor league baseball team based in Hugo, Oklahoma. In 1913 and 1914, Hugo teams played exclusively as members of the Class D level Texas-Oklahoma League, hosting home games at Ansley Park. Hugo played the 1913 season as the "Hugoites."

At age 18, Baseball Hall of Fame member Rogers Hornsby played for the 1914 Hugo Scouts in his first professional season.

== History ==
Professional baseball began in Hugo, Oklahoma in the middle of the 1913 season. The Hogo Hugoites began play in the eight–team Class D level Texas-Oklahoma League. On July 7, 1913, the Wichita Falls Drillers franchise relocated to Hugo, Oklahoma. Hugo joined the Ardmore Giants, Bonham Blues, Denison Blue Sox, Durant Choctaws, Paris Boosters, Sherman Lions and Texarkana Tigers in league play.

The Wichita Falls Drillers had a 33–46 record when the franchise relocated to Hugo on July 7, 1913. The team compiled a 21–21 record while based in Hugo and finished with an overall record of 54–70. The Wichita/Hugo team placed sixth in the Texas–Oklahoma League, playing under Manager Fred Morris. The Hugoites finished 29.5 games behind the first place Denison Blue Sox in the final standings. Wichita/Hugo player Fred Nicholson led the league with both 90 runs scored and 147 hits.

The team became known as the Hugo "Scouts" in 1914, as the franchise continued play as members of the Texas–Oklahoma League, before folding during the season. On June 11, 1914, the Hugo Scouts had compiled a 19–32 record playing under managers Lon Ury and Leo Nevitt when the franchise disbanded. The Ardmore Indians franchise disbanded on the same day. The Texas–Oklahoma League folded permanently after the 1914 season.

At age 18, Baseball Hall of Fame member Rogers Hornsby played for the 1914 Hugo Scouts in his first professional season. Hornsby reportedly signed with the Scouts for $75.00 per month. Hornsby hit .232 and committed 45 errors during the season.

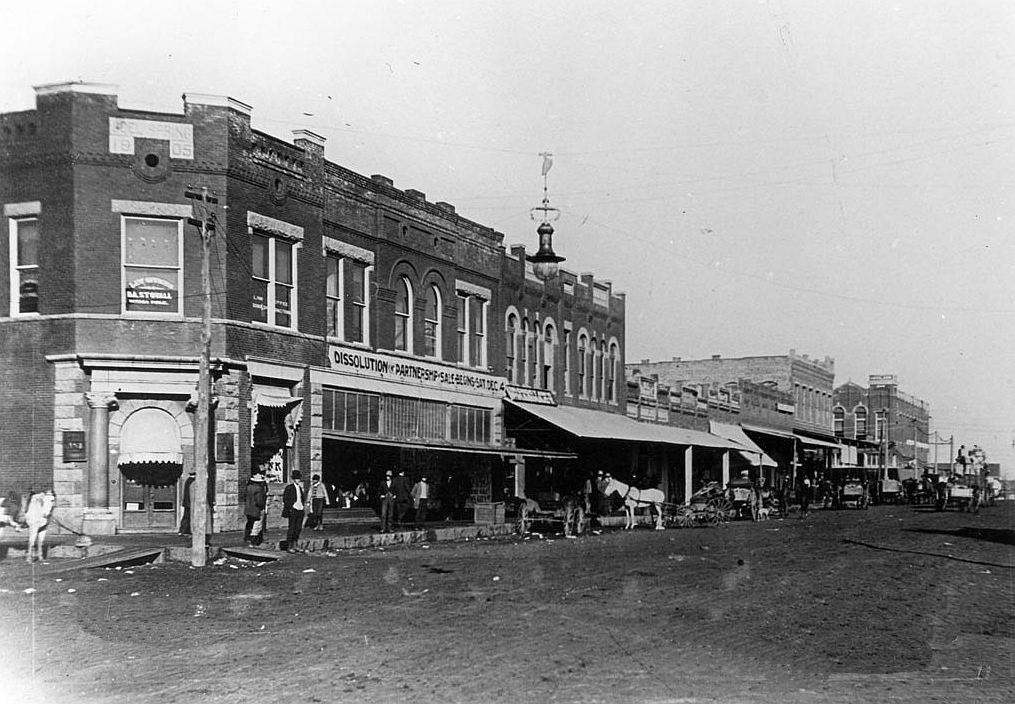
(1910) Hugo, Oklahoma

Hugo, Oklahoma has not hosted another minor league team.

== The ballpark ==
The Hugo minor league teams played minor league home games at Ansley Park. Today, the park is still in use as a public park. Ansley Park is located at North Broadway & East Lloyd Street in Hugo.

== Timeline ==
Year(s)	# Yrs.	Team	Level	League	Ballpark
1913	1	Hugo Hugoites	Class D	Texas-Oklahoma League	Ansley Park
1914	1	Hugo Scouts	Class D	Texas-Oklahoma League	Ansley Park

== Year–by–year records ==
Year	Record	Finish	Manager	Playoffs/Notes
1913	54–70	6th	Fred Morris	Wichita Falls moved to Hugo July 7; 21–21 in Hugo
1914	19–32	NA	Lon Ury / Leo Nevitt	Team folded June 11

== Notable alumni ==
- Rogers Hornsby (1914) Inducted Baseball Hall of Fame, 1942
- Bill Brown (1913–1914)
- Harry Kane (1913)
- Rollie Naylor (1913)
- Fred Nicholson (1913–1914)
- Jim Scoggins (1913)
- Lon Ury (1914, MGR)

== See also ==
- Hugo Scouts players
- Hugo Hugoites players
