= Texas–Oklahoma League =

Minor League Baseball circuit

- Classification: Class D (1911–1914, 1921–1922)
- Sport: Minor League Baseball
- First season: 1911; 115 years ago
- Folded: 1922; 104 years ago
- President: F.P. St. Clair (1911); Tom D. Newcomb (1912); C.O. Johnson (1912–1914); A.M. Keisker (1921); J. Doak Roberts (1922)
- No. of teams: 6
- Country: United States
- Most titles: 2 Paris Snappers (1921–1922)

The Texas–Oklahoma League was a Minor League Baseball Class-D circuit that operated between 1911 and 1922. The league formed twice, the first began in 1911 and finished in 1914, while the second was active in 1921 and 1922. League franchises were based in Oklahoma and Texas.

== Cities/Teams/Years ==
Cities represented	Teams	Year(s)
Altus, Oklahoma	Altus Chiefs	1911
Ardmore, Oklahoma	Ardmore Blues; Ardmore Giants; Ardmore Indians; Ardmore Peps; Ardmore Producers	1911; 1912–1913; 1914; 1921; 1922
Bonham, Texas	Bonham Boosters; Bonham Tigers; Bonham Blues; Bonham Sliders; Bonham Favorites; Bonham Bingers	1911; 1912; 1913; 1914; 1921; 1922
Cleburne, Texas	Cleburne Railroaders; Cleburne Generals	1911; 1921–1922
Corsicana, Texas	Corsicana Gumbo Busters	1922
Denison, Texas	Denison Katydids; Denison Blue Sox; Denison Champions	1912; 1913; 1914
Durant, Oklahoma	Durant Educators; Durant Choctaws; Durant Gladiators	1911; 1912–1913; 1914
Gainesville, Texas	Gainesville Blue Ribbons	1911
Graham, Texas	Graham Hijackers	1921
Greenville, Texas	Greenville Highlanders; Greenville Togs	1912; 1922
Hugo, Oklahoma	Hugo Hugoites; Hugo Scouts	1913; 1914
Lawton, Oklahoma	Lawton Medicine Men	1911
McKinney, Texas	McKinney	1912
Mexia, Texas	Mexia Gushers	1922
Mineral Wells, Texas	Mineral Wells Resorters	1921
Paris, Texas	Paris Boosters; Paris Snappers	1913; 1914, 1921–1922
Sherman, Texas	Sherman Cubs; Sherman Lions; Sherman Red Sox	1912; 1913–1914, 1921; 1922
Texarkana, Texas	Texarkana Tigers	1913–1914
Wichita Falls, Texas	Wichita Falls Irish Lads; Wichita Falls Drillers	1911; 1912–1913

== Standings & statistics ==
=== 1911 to 1914 ===
1911 Texas–Oklahoma League
schedule 1st half
2nd half

Team standings	W	L	PCT	GB	Managers
Wichita Falls Irish Lads	65	38	.631	-	Fred Morris, Sr. / Dick Naylor
Durant Educators	65	46	.586	4.0	W.W. Washington / Joe Connors / Bennie Brownlow
Cleburne Railroaders	61	50	.550	8.0	Will Reed / Jiggs Donahue / Dad Ritter
Bonham Boosters	54	60	.474	16.5	Jimmie Humphries
Ardmore Blues	49	58	.458	18.0	Emmett Rogers / Hillis / George McAvoy
Altus Chiefs	31	44	.413	NA	Muggsy Monroe / Sam Campbell / George Partain
Gainesville Blue Ribbons	19	30	.388	NA	John Stone / George Morris
Lawton Medicine Men	17	31	.354	NA	Cap Metcalf / C. Pinkerton

Gainesville disbanded June 14; Lawton disbanded June 16; Altus disbanded July 18.
Playoff: Wichita Falls leading Cleburne 2 games to 1, when Wichita Falls refused to continue due to an ineligible player and non-payment of gate receipts for a game in Cleburne. Cleburne was declared champion.

Player statistics
Player	Team	Stat	Tot	Player	Team	Stat	Tot
Art Naylor	Wichita Falls	BA	.377	Hetty Green	Wichita Falls	W	18
Bill Brown	Wichita Falls	Runs	79	Roy Grady	Durant	SO	181
Art Naylor	Wichita Falls	Hits	136	Hetty Green	Wichita Falls	PCT	.783 18–5
Clifford Witherspoon	Wichita Falls	HR	16				

1912 Texas–Oklahoma League
schedule

Team standings	W	L	PCT	GB	Managers
Ardmore Giants	62	32	.660	-	George McAvoy
Bonham Tigers	53	35	.6022	6.0	Roy Leslie
Sherman Cubs	56	37	.6021	6.5	Jimmie Humphries
Wichita Falls Drillers	52	38	.578	8	Fred Morris
Denison Katydids	44	49	.473	17.5	Horace Covington / Hart McCormick
Durant Choctaws/ Durant Hustlers	26	64	.289	34	Hetty Green / Mitchell / Charles Dierdorff / Bill Harper
Greenville Highlanders	14	25	.359	NA	Richard Atkins / Bill Harper
McKinney	6	33	.154	NA	Alfred Scott / Art Pennell / Blair Kerr

McKinney and Greenville disbanded June 7.
Playoffs: Wichita Falls was leading Ardmore 2 games to 1 when Ardmore disbanded August 1. The title was awarded to Wichita Falls.

Player statistics
Player	Team	Stat	Tot	Player	Team	Stat	Tot
Bill Brown	Wichita Falls	BA	.326	Bud Napier	Sherman	W	20
George McAvoy	Ardmore	Runs	68	Ewell Russell	Bonham	SO	227
Art Naylor	Ardmore	Hits	105	Bud Napier	Sherman	PCT	.741 20–7
Fred Morris	Wichita Falls	HR	9				

1913 Texas–Oklahoma League
schedule

Team standings	W	L	PCT	GB	Managers
Denison Blue Sox	82	39	.678	-	Babe Peebles
Paris Boosters	80	45	.640	4.0	Jack Jutze
Texarkana Tigers	73	53	.579	11.5	Dad Ritter / Dee Poindexter
Sherman Lions	68	58	.540	16.5	Jimmie Humphries
Bonham Blues	56	68	.452	27.5	Roy Leslie
Wichita Falls Drillers / Hugo Hugoites	54	70	.435	29.5	Fred Morris
Ardmore Giants	43	80	.350	40.0	Art Naylor/ Whitey Hewitt / Lew Pelkey / Brooks Gordon
Durant Choctaws	41	84	.328	43.0	Dick Speer

Wichita Falls (33–46) moved to Hugo July 7.

Player statistics
Player	Team	Stat	Tot	Player	Team	Stat	Tot
Ray Nagle	Paris	BA	.310	Joe Pate	Texarkana	W	23
Fred Nicholson	Wichita/Hugo	Runs	90	Ben Tincup	Sherman	SO	233
Fred Nicholson	Wichita/Hugo	Hits	147	James Haislip	Denison	Pct	.769; 20–6
Ray Wakefield	Denison	SB	80	Grady Higginbotham	Denison	Pct	.769; 20–6

1914 Texas–Oklahoma League
schedule

Team standings	W	L	PCT	GB	Managers
Paris Snappers	77	39	.664	-	Johnny Fillman
Texarkana Tigers	79	41	.658	0.0	Dad Ritter
Denison Champions	68	49	.581	9.5	Babe Peebles
Durant Gladiators	46	73	.387	32.5	Fred Morris / Jimmie Humphries
Bonham Sliders	47	58	.448	NA	Senter Rainey / Kid Nichols
Sherman Lions	30	75	.286	NA	Dolly Gray / Charlie Moran / Harry Webber
Ardmore Indians	26	25	.510	NA	Brooks Gordon
Hugo Scouts	19	32	.373	NA	Lon Ury / Leo Nevitt

Hugo and Ardmore disbanded June 11; Bonham and Sherman disbanded July 30.
Playoff: Texarkana 3 games, Paris 1.

Player statistics
Player	Team	Stat	Tot	Player	Team	Stat	Tot
Bill Stellbauer	Texarkana	BA	.351	Dickie Kerr	Paris	W	22
Ray Nagle	Paris	Runs	80	Joe Neeley	Bonham/Denison	SO	198
Bill Stellbauer	Texarkana	Hits	151	Tex Covington	Hugo/Denison	PCT	.800; 16–4
Harry O'Neill	Texarkana	HR	7				

=== 1921 & 1922 ===
1921 Texas–Oklahoma League
schedule

Team standings	W	L	PCT	GB	Managers
Paris Snappers	89	38	.701	-	Red Snapp
Ardmore Peps	87	40	.685	2.0	Coon Bates / Walter Thompson / Joe Chelette / Sled Allen
Bonham Favorites	57	71	.445	32.5	G.D. Pittman / Virgil Moss
Cleburne Generals	51	75	.398	37.5	M.H. Robertson / Pete Dillon / William Hopper
Graham Hijackers / Mineral Wells Resorters	49	79	.383	40.5	Ed Appleton / Roy Akin / C. Van Zandt / Eli Boggus
Sherman Lions	48	78	.381	40.5	Babe Peebles / Curley Maloney

Graham (5-24) moved to Mineral Wells May 27, first home game May 30.
Playoff: Ardmore 4 games, Paris 4; Ardmore refused to play at Paris. Paris was named champion.

Player statistics
Player	Team	Stat	Tot	Player	Team	Stat	Tot
Olin Nokes	Mineral Wells	BA	.355	George Phillips	Paris	W	26
Roswell Higginbotham	Paris	Runs	101	Sam Gray	Sherman	SO	237
William Hopper	Cleburne	Hits	145	George Phillips	Paris	PCT	.839 26–5
G.C. Rainey	Graham/Mineral Wells/Sherman	HR	11				

1922 Texas–Oklahoma League
schedule

Team standings	W	L	PCT	GB	Managers
Paris Snappers	72	36	.667	-	Red Snapp
Greenville Togs	66	40	.623	5.0	Bennie Brownlow
Corsicana Gumbo Busters	56	46	.549	13.0	Chuck Miller / Harvey Grubb
Ardmore Producers	49	60	.450	23.5	Curley Maloney / Elia Boggus
Sherman Red Sox	48	60	.444	24.0	Grady Higginbotham
Mexia Gushers	47	60	.439	24.5	Roy Akin
Bonham Bingers	39	53	.424	NA	Les Tullos
Cleburne Generals	36	58	.386	NA	Lindy Hiett

Cleburne disbanded July 22; Bonham was dropped July 22.
The season was shortened to August 6 with National Association permission due to a railroad strike.

Player statistics
Player	Team	Stat	Tot	Player	Team	Stat	Tot
Chink Taylor	Paris	BA	.369	Sam Gray	Paris	W	23
Joe Bratcher	Paris	Runs	100	Sam Gray	Paris	SO	219
Joe Bratcher	Paris	Hits	138	Edwin Bryan	Greenville	PCT	.864 19–3
Edward Seely	Greenville	HR	21				

== Hall of Fame alumni ==
- Rogers Hornsby, 1914 Hugo Scouts; 1914 Denison Champions
- Kid Nichols, 1914 Bonham Sliders

== Championship teams ==
- 1911 Cleburne Railroaders
- 1912 Ardmore Giants
- 1913 Denison Blue Sox
- 1914 Texarkana Tigers
- 1921 Paris Snappers
- 1922 Paris Snappers

== Sources ==
- Minor League Baseball Standings: All North American Leagues, through 1999 – Benjamin Barrett Sumner. Publisher: McFarland & Company, 2000. Format: Hardcover, 726pp. Language: English. ISBN 0-7864-0781-6
- Encyclopedia of Minor League Baseball: The Official Record of Minor League Baseball – Lloyd Johnson, Miles Wolff, Steve McDonald. Publisher: Baseball America, 1997. Format: Paperback, 672pp. Language: English. ISBN 0-9637189-7-5
