= Denison Railroaders =

American franchise in minor league baseball

- 1915–1917; Denison, Texas

Minor league affiliations
- Class: Class D (1915-1917)
- League: Western Association (1915-1917)

Major league affiliations
- Team: None

Team data
- Name: Denison Railroaders (1915-1917)

The Denison Railroaders were a minor league baseball franchise based in Denison, Texas, from 1915 to 1917 that competed in the Western Association. The city of Denison had previously hosted a franchise in the Texas–Oklahoma League for three seasons, which in 1914 was known as the Denison Champions.

The Railroaders were managed for all three seasons by Babe Peebles, who had also managed in Denison in 1913 and 1914.

Multiple players of the Railroaders had spent time in, or would later spend time in, Major League Baseball. These include: Tex Covington, Jerry D'Arcy, Rogers Hornsby, Clarence Huber, Ray Jansen, Walt Kinney, Fred Nicholson, Farmer Ray, Kid Speer, and Doc Watson.
