= Gainesville Blue Ribbons =

- 1911; Gainesville, Texas

Minor league affiliations
- Class: Class D (1911)
- League: Texas-Oklahoma League (1911)

Major league affiliations
- Team: None

Minor league titles
- League titles (0): None

Team data
- Name: Gainesville Blue Ribbons (1911)
- Ballpark: Fair Grounds Park (1911)

The Gainesville Blue Ribbons were a minor league baseball team based in Gainesville, Texas. In 1911, the Blue Ribbons played briefly as members of the Class D level Texas-Oklahoma League, before the team folded during the season. Gainesville hosted home minor league games at Fair Grounds Park. The Blue Ribbons preceded the Gainesville Owls, who began play as members of the Big State League in 1947.

== History ==
In 1911, the Gainesville "Blue Ribbons" became a charter member of the eight–team, Class D level Texas–Oklahoma League.

The Blue Ribbons joined the Altus Chiefs, Bonham Boosters, Ardmore Blues, Cleburne Railroaders, Durant Educators, Lawton Medicine Men and Wichita Falls Irish Lads in beginning Texas–Oklahoma League play on April 25, 1911.

The "Blue Ribbons" nickname corresponds to Gainesville hosting home games at the Fair Grounds Park.

On June 14, 1911, the Gainesville Blue Ribbons folded. When the team folded, Gainesville had played the season under managers John Stone and George Morris. Lawton disbanded within days of Altus, followed by Altus on July 18, whose folding corresponded with the end of the 1st half of the split–season schedule for the Texas–Oklahoma League.

Gainesville finished their partial season with a final record of 19–30, with the Lawton Medicine Men (17–31) and Altus Chiefs (31–44) also ending their seasons early. In the final Texas–Oklahoma League overall standings, the Wichita Falls Irish Lads (65–38) led the league, followed by the Durant Educators (65–46), Cleburne Railroaders (61–50), Bonham Boosters (54–60) and Ardmore Blues (49–58). The Wichita Falls Irish Lads won the 1st half title and Cleburne won the 2nd half title. In the playoff final, Wichita Falls had a two games to one lead, but refused to play game four after a financial dispute and Cleburne was awarded the championship.

Gainesville did not field a franchise in the 1912 Texas–Oklahoma League. Gainesville, Texas next hosted minor league baseball, when the 1947 Gainesville Owls began play as members of the Class B level Big State League.

== The Ballpark ==
The Gainesville Blue Ribbons hosted home games at Fair Grounds Park.Today, the Cooke County Fair is still an annual event, having begun in 1871. The Fair Grounds were relocated to a new location in 1983.

== Year–by–year record ==
| Year | Record | Finish | Manager | Playoffs/Notes |
|---|---|---|---|---|
| 1911 | 19–30 | NA | John Stone / George Morris | Team folded June 14 |

== Notable alumni ==
No Gainesville Blue Ribbons' alumni advanced to the major leagues.
