= Altus Chiefs =

- 1911; Altus, Oklahoma

Minor league affiliations
- Class: Class D (1911)
- League: Texas-Oklahoma League (1911)

Major league affiliations
- Team: None

Minor league titles
- League titles (0): None

Team data
- Name: Altus Chiefs (1911)
- Ballpark: League Park (1911)

The Altus Chiefs were a minor league baseball team based in Altus, Oklahoma. For one season, in 1911, the "Chiefs" played as members of the Class D level Texas-Oklahoma League, before folding during the season. Altus hosted home minor league games at League Park, whose location is unknown.

== History ==
In 1911, the Altus first hosted minor league baseball, when the "Chiefs" became a charter member of the eight–team, Class D level Texas–Oklahoma League.

The Chiefs joined the Bonham Boosters, Ardmore Blues, Cleburne Railroaders, Durant Educators, Gainesville Blue Ribbons, Lawton Medicine Men and Wichita Falls Irish Lads teams in beginning Texas–Oklahoma League play on April 25, 1911.

The team being known by "Chiefs" nickname corresponds to local history. Today, Altus is home to the Museum of the Western Prairie, which has American Indian artifacts.

On July 18, 1911, the Chiefs folded, after playing under managers Roy Monroe and George Partain. The Gainesville and Lawton teams had disbanded in June, before Altus, whose folding corresponded with the end of the first half of the split–season schedule for the Texas–Oklahoma League.

Altus finished their season with a final record of 31–44, with the Gainesville Blue Ribbons (19–30) and Lawton Medicine Men (17–31) also ending their seasons early. In the final league overall standings, the Wichita Falls Irish Lads (65–38) led the league, followed by the Durant Educators (65–46), Cleburne Railroaders (61–50), Bonham Boosters (54–60) and Ardmore Blues (49–58). Wichita Falls won the first half title and Cleburne won the second half title. In the playoffs, Wichita Falls refused to play game four after a financial dispute and Cleburne was awarded the championship.

Altus has not hosted another minor league team.

== The ballpark ==
The exact location of the field hosting Altus Chiefs home games is unknown, but press accounts suggest that it must have been in reasonably close proximity to the courthouse square in the center of town, as they describe fans engaging in pregame activities at the square. The facility was shared with amateur teams of the era, as indicated by press reports referring games played at the "League Park" that also involved pregame festivities at the square. The courthouse square is the current site of the Jackson County Courthouse (Oklahoma), which was under construction beginning in 1910 and was completed in 1911. Courthouse square was a frequent meeting place for the people of Altus and Jackson County prior to completion of the courthouse building.

Some sources have claimed that the Altus Chiefs played at the current site of the Kiwanis Ballpark, but that is unlikely, as that site is a considerable distance from the courthouse square. In fact, the Kiwanis Ballpark was not originally located at its current site, as it previously occupied a site in the far eastern part of town, even further from the courthouse square, at North Park Avenue and East Fitter Avenue. The current Kiwanis ballpark did not begin showing up on maps at its present location until later in the 1950s.

== Year–by–year record ==
Year	Record	Finish	Manager	Playoffs/Notes
1911	31–44	NA	Roy Monroe / George Partain	Team disbanded July 18

== Notable alumni ==
No Altus Chiefs' alumni advanced to the major leagues.
On November 11, 1918, former Chiefs player Calvin Bryant was killed in battle during World War I, while serving for the U.S. Army in France.
