= Roy Leslie =

American baseball player (1894–1972)

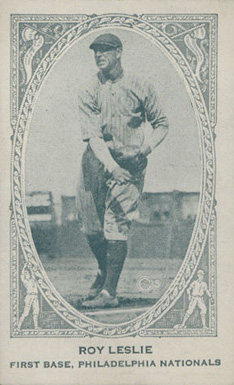
- First baseman
- Born: August 23, 1894; Bailey, Texas, U.S.
- Died: April 9, 1972 (aged 77); Sherman, Texas, U.S.
- Batted: Right Threw: Right

MLB debut
- September 6, 1917, for the Chicago Cubs

Last MLB appearance
- October 1, 1922, for the Philadelphia Phillies

MLB statistics
- Batting average: .266
- Home runs: 6
- Runs batted in: 55
- Stats at Baseball Reference

Teams
- Chicago Cubs (1917); St. Louis Cardinals (1919); Philadelphia Phillies (1922)

Roy Reid Leslie (August 23, 1894 – April 9, 1972) was an American Major League Baseball first baseman. He played during three major league seasons for three teams, including a stint as the regular first baseman for the Philadelphia Phillies in 1922.

Leslie's minor league baseball career spanned seventeen seasons. He began his career with the Bonham Blues of the Texas–Oklahoma League in 1913, and his last season came in 1929 with the Tyler Trojans of the Lone Star League. He is listed as the Blues' manager in 1912 at age 17, even before his playing career began.

== Sources ==
- Career statistics from Baseball Reference · Baseball Reference (Minors) · Retrosheet · Baseball Almanac
- Roy Leslie at SABR (Baseball BioProject)
