= Rick Adams (baseball) =

American baseball player (1878–1955)

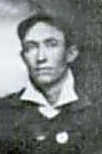
- Pitcher
- Born: December 24, 1878; Paris, Texas, U.S.
- Died: March 10, 1955 (aged 76); Paris, Texas, U.S.
- Batted: Left Threw: Left

MLB debut
- July 13, 1905, for the Washington Senators

Last MLB appearance
- September 29, 1905, for the Washington Senators

MLB statistics
- Win–loss record: 2–5
- Earned run average: 3.59
- Strikeouts: 25
- Stats at Baseball Reference

Teams
- Washington Senators (1905)

Reuben Alexander "Rick" Adams (December 24, 1878 – March 10, 1955) was an American professional baseball player whose career spanned over 13 seasons, including one in Major League Baseball with the Washington Senators (1905). In his one major league season, Adams went 2–5 with a 3.59 earned run average (ERA), three complete games, one shutout and 25 strikeouts in 11 games, six starts. Adams also played in the minor leagues with the Spokane Blue Stockings (1901), Tacoma Tigers (1901), Paris Eisenfelder's Homeseekers (1902), New Orleans Pelicans (1902–1903), Montreal Royals (1904), Temple Boll Weevils (1905), Cleburne Railroaders (1906), Denver Grizzlies (1907–1910), Houston Buffaloes (1911), Denison Blue Sox (1913) and Denison Champions. Over his minor league career, Adams went 169–125 in 280 games. He batted and threw left-handed.

== Professional career ==
=== Early career ===
Adams began his professional career in the Class-D Pacific Northwest League in 1901. That season, he played for the Spokane Blue Stockings and the Tacoma Tigers. Between the two teams, Adams went 18–16. In 1902, Adams started the season with the Class-D Paris Eisenfelder's Homeseekers of the Texas League. With Paris, he went 18–11 in 31 games, 28 starts. Amongst Texas League pitchers, Adams was fifth in wins. Later that season, Adams joined the Class-A New Orleans Pelicans where he went 6–1 in nine games, all starts. In 1903, Adams continued playing with the Pelicans. On the season, he went 14–11 in 29 games. Adams joined the Class-A Montreal Royals and went 13–10. After the season, Adams returned to his home in Texas. On March 16, 1905, Adams re-signed with the Montreal Royals. However, Adams did not play with the Royals in 1905, instead playing with the Class-C Temple Boll Weevils of the Texas League. In 16 games, Adams went 13–3.

=== Washington Senators ===
During the 1905 season, while playing with the Temple Boll Weevils, Adams joined the Washington Senators Major League Baseball franchise. Adams made his major league debut on July 13, 1905. On the season, Adams went 2–5 with a 3.59 ERA, three complete games, one shutout and 25 strikeouts in 11 games, six starts. His last appearance in Major League Baseball was on September 29, 1905.

=== Later career ===
In 1906, Adams joined the Class-D Cleburne Railroaders. On the season, he went 25–13 in 40 games. Amongst Texas League pitchers, Adams was tied for first in wins. Adams joined the Class-A Denver Grizzlies of the Western League in 1907. With the Bears that season, Adams played 27 games. In 1908, still with the Bears, Adams went 16–17. Adams continued playing with the Bears in 1909 and went 15–13 in 25 games. During the 1910 season, Adams' last with the Denver Bears, he went 9–5. In 1911, Adams joined the Class-B Houston Buffaloes of the Texas League. He went 2–11 that season. Adams was absent from the professional baseball circuit in 1912, however, he returned in 1913 to play with the Class-D Denison Blue Sox. In 20 games with the Blue Sox, Adams went 6–7. In his final season in professional baseball, 1913, Adams played for the Class-D Denison Champions where he went 14–7.
