= Grady Higginbotham =

American athlete and coach (1892–1989)

- Higginbotham pictured in La Ventana 1927, Texas Tech yearbook

Biographical details
- Born: December 31, 1892; Jameson, Texas, U.S.
- Died: February 10, 1989 (aged 96); Houston, Texas, U.S.

Playing career

Football
- 1912: Texas A&M

Baseball
- 1912: Texas A&M
- 1913: Denison Blue Sox
- 1914: Dubuque Dubs
- 1915–1916: Denison Railroaders
- 1916: Sherman Lions
- Position: Fullback (football)

Coaching career (HC unless noted)

Football
- 1924: Daniel Baker
- 1925–1928: Texas Tech (assistant)
- 1929: Texas Tech

Basketball
- 1925–1927: Texas Tech

Baseball
- 1922: Sherman Red Sox
- 1928–1929: Texas Tech

Administrative career (AD unless noted)
- 1927–1929: Texas Tech

Head coaching record
- Overall: 4–13–3 (football); 12–18 (basketball); 10–17 (college baseball)

Grailey Hewett "Grady" Higginbotham (December 31, 1892 – February 10, 1989) was an American football and baseball player at Texas A&M University, as well as a coach of football, basketball, and baseball, and college athletics administrator at Texas Tech University. He was nicknamed "Big Hig".

== Early life ==
Higginbotham was born on 31 December 1892 in Jameson, Texas (became a ghost town in the 1910s). He was the older brother of Roswell G. Higginbotham, who would also go on to play at Texas A&M and became a college baseball coach.

== Career ==
=== Playing career ===
Higginbotham played college football and college baseball at Texas A&M University. After graduating, he played in minor league baseball for several years.

=== Coaching career ===
Higginbotham was the first head coach of the Texas Tech Red Raiders men's basketball team, leading it to a 14–18 record from 1925 to 1927. Higginbotham coached the Red Raiders baseball team to a 10–17 record from 1928 to 1929. He was also the head coach of the Texas Tech Red Raiders football team in 1929, tallying a record of 1–7–2. He was the athletic director at Texas Tech from 1927 to 1929.

== Head coaching record ==
=== Football ===
Year	Team	Overall	Conference	Standing	Bowl/playoffs
Daniel Baker Hill Billies (Texas Intercollegiate Athletic Association) (1924)
1924	Daniel Baker	3–6–1	2–4–1	T–8th	
Daniel Baker:		3–6–1	2–4–1		
Texas Tech Matadors (Independent) (1929)
1929	Texas Tech	1–7–2			
Texas Tech:		1–7–2			
Total:		4–13–3			

=== Basketball ===
Record table
Season	Team	Overall	Conference	Standing	Postseason
Texas Tech Matadors (Independent) (1925–1927)
1925–26	Texas Tech	6–8			
1926–27	Texas Tech	8–10			
Texas Tech:		14–18			
Total:		14–18			

=== Baseball ===
Record table
Season	Team	Overall	Conference	Standing	Postseason
Texas Tech Matadors (Independent) (1928–1929)
1928	Texas Tech	8–6			
1929	Texas Tech	2–11			
Texas Tech:		10–17			
Total:		10–17			
