= Con Lucid =

American baseball player and coach (1874–1931)

- Pitcher
- Born: February 24, 1874; Dublin, Ireland
- Died: June 25, 1931 (aged 57); Houston, Texas, U.S.
- Batted: Unknown Threw: Unknown

MLB debut
- May 1, 1893, for the Louisville Colonels

Last MLB appearance
- August 15, 1897, for the St. Louis Browns

MLB statistics
- Win–loss record: 23–23
- Earned run average: 6.02
- Strikeouts: 65
- Stats at Baseball Reference

Teams
- Louisville Colonels (1893); Brooklyn Grooms (1894–1895); Philadelphia Phillies (1895–1896); St. Louis Browns (1897)

Cornelius Cecil Lucid (February 24, 1874 – June 25, 1931) was an American professional baseball pitcher and coach. He played from 1893 to 1897 in the National League.

Lucid's minor league baseball career spanned the period of 1890 to 1906. In addition to pitching as he had done in the Major Leagues, he also occasionally played outfield as well. His two best seasons in the minor leagues were 1896 and 1904. In 1896 with three different teams, he had a record of 12–2 with an earned run average of 2.48 in 16 games. In 1904, he had a record of 13–8 in 21 games with the Pine Bluff Lumbermen.

Lucid managed and played for the Temple Boll Weevils of the Texas League during the entirety of the 1905 season and part of the 1906 season.

In 1915 Lucid served as the coach of the Texas A&M Aggies baseball team. During his one season, he had a record of 16–5 overall and a record of 6–5 in the Southwest Conference.

Lucid died of heart disease at age 57, in Houston, Texas.

== See also ==
- List of players from Ireland in Major League Baseball
