= Bonham, Texas minor league baseball history =

Bonham, Texas minor league baseball teams
- 1898–1922; (1898, 1911–1914, 1921–1922); Bonham, Texas

Minor league affiliations
- Class: Independent (1898); Class D (1911–1914, 1921–1922)
- League: Southwestern League (1898); Texas-Oklahoma League (1911–1914, 1921–1922)

Major league affiliations
- Team: None

Minor league titles
- League titles (0): None

Team data
- Name: Bonham (1898); Bonham Boosters (1911); Bonham Tigers (1912); Bonham Blues (1913); Bonham Sliders (1914); Bonham Favorites (1921); Bonham Bingers (1922)
- Ballpark: Unknown

Minor league baseball teams were based in Bonham, Texas in various seasons between 1898 and 1922. Bonham teams played as members of the Independent level Southwestern League in 1898 and the Class D level Texas-Oklahoma League from 1911 to 1914 and 1921 to 1922. Bonham teams featured a different moniker each season.

Baseball Hall of Fame member Kid Nichols managed the 1914 Bonham Sliders.

== History ==
Professional baseball began in Bonham in 1898. The Bonham team played as a member of the Independent level Southwestern League. Bonham finished with a 6–9 record as the league quickly folded in 1898. The Southwestern League played from April 21, 1898, to May 23, 1898.

In 1911, Bonham resumed minor league play. The Bonham Boosters became a member of the Class D level Texas-Oklahoma League. Bonham would continue playing as league members from 1911 to 1914 and 1921 to 1922, which covered all six seasons of play for the league.

The 1911 Bonham Boosters finished with a record of 54–60, to place fourth in the Texas–Oklahoma League, playing under manager Jimmie Humphries. The Boosters finished with the Altus Chiefs (31–44), Ardmore Blues (49–58), Cleburne Railroaders (61–50), Durant Educators (65–46), Gainesville Blue Ribbons, Lawton Medicine Men (17–31) and Wichita Falls Irish Lads (65–38) in the 1911 league standings.

Continuing play, the 1912 Bonham Tigers finished with a record of 53–35, placing second overall in the Texas–Oklahoma League standings. The Tigers played under manager Roy Leslie. The Tigers threw two no–hitters in 1912. On April 30, 1912, Bonham pitcher Wingo Anderson threw a no–hitter in a 9–0 victory over McKinney. Then, on May 25, 1912, Bonham pitcher Reb Russell threw a second Tiger no–hitter, beating Durant 9–1. The 1912 Texas–Oklahoma League playoffs did not include Bonham.

The 1913 Bonham Blues placed fifth in the Texas–Oklahoma League final standings. With a 56–68 record, the Blues' manager was again Roy Leslie. On opening day, April 15, 1913, the Bonham Blues opened their new baseball park, playing against the Texarkana Tigers. Bonham won the opener 3–0. Before the game, fans gathered at the town square for a posed photo and a parade to the ballpark. The Bonham Daily Favorite newspaper reported on April 16, 1913, that "Practically every business house in the city closed during the game which began at 3:15 o'clock, and perhaps the largest crowd that ever attended a ball game in Bonham was present. The grandstand and bleachers were full, and the crowd overflowed into right field."

Bonham continued play as members of the Texas–Oklahoma League in 1914. On June 22, 1914, Bonham pitcher Fritz Redford threw a no–hitter in a 7–0 Bonham win over the Sherman Lions. Just a little over a week later, on June 30, 1914, the Bonham Sliders had a 47–58 record under managers Senter Reiney and Kid Nichols when the franchise disbanded. Nichols is a member of the Baseball Hall of Fame. The Texas–Oklahoma League League folded after the 1914 season.

The 1921 Bonham Favorites joined the reformed Texas-Oklahoma League. The Favorites finished with a record of 57–71, playing under Managers G. D. Pittman and Virgil Moss. Bonham finished third in the league, joining the Ardmore Peps (87–40), Cleburne Generals (51–75), Graham Hijackers/Mineral Wells Resorters (49–79), Paris Snappers and Sherman Lions (48–78) in the 1921 league standings.

1922 was the final year for both the Texas–Oklahoma League and the Bonham franchise. The 1922 Bonham Bingers finished with a record of 39–53, placing seventh in the league. The Bingers' manager was Les Tullos. Bonham was dropped from the league on July 22, 1922, when the Cleburne franchise disbanded. The 1922 Texas–Oklahoma League season ended on August 6, 1922, with National Association permission, due to a railroad strike. The league did not reform in 1923 and permanently disbanded.

Bonham, Texas has not hosted another minor league team.

== Ballparks ==
The home Bonhnam ballpark is not directly named in references. Catron Park and Simpson Park were noted to have been in use in the era. Both parks still exist today as public parks. Catron Park is located at the 400 block of East 3rd Street, Bonham Texas.

Bonham built a new ballpark for the 1913 season. The name of the 1913 new ballpark is not known.

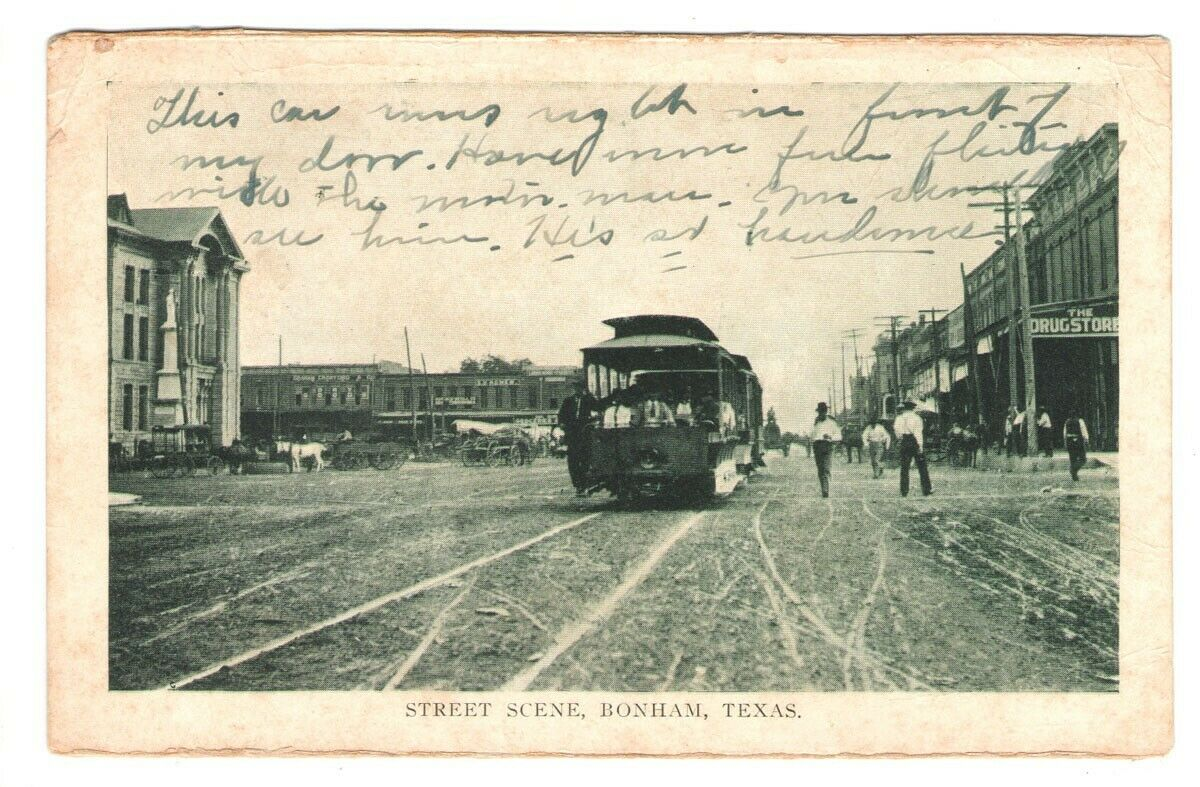
Bonham, Texas. May 16, 1919

== Timeline ==
Year(s)	# Yrs.	Team	Level	League
1898	1	Bonham	Independent	Southwestern League
1911	1	Bonham Boosters	Class D	Texas-Oklahoma League
1912	1	Bonham Blues	Class D	Texas-Oklahoma League
1913	1	Bonham Tigers	Class D	Texas-Oklahoma League
1914	1	Bonham Sliders	Class D	Texas-Oklahoma League
1921	1	Bonham Favorites	Class D	Texas-Oklahoma League
1922	1	Bonham Bingers	Class D	Texas-Oklahoma League

== Year–by–year records ==
Year	Record	Finish	Manager	Playoffs/Notes
1898	6–9	6th	NA	League folded May 23
1911	54–60	4th	Jimmie Humphries	No playoffs held
1912	53–35	2nd	Roy Leslie	No playoffs held
1913	56–68	5th	Roy Leslie	No playoffs held
1914	47–58	NA	Senter Reiney / Kid Nichols	Team folded July 30
1921	57–71	3rd	G.D. Pittman / Virgil Moss	No playoffs held
1922	39–53	7th	Les Tullos	Team folded July 22

== Notable alumni ==
- Kid Nichols (1914, MGR) Inducted Baseball Hall of Fame, 1949
- Ted Blankenship (1921–1922)
- Buster Chatham (1922)
- Jim Haislip (1911)
- Jimmie Humphries (1911, MGR)
- Roy Leslie (1912–1913, MGR)
- George Milstead (1921–1922)
- Reb Russell (1912)
- Bonham Bingers players
- Bonham Blues players
- Bonham Boosters players
- Bonham Favorites players
