= Roswell G. Higginbotham =

American football and baseball player and coach (1898–1943)

Biographical details
- Born: August 15, 1898; Howe, Texas, U.S.
- Died: May 25, 1943 (aged 44); Quonset Point, Rhode Island, U.S.

Playing career

Football
- 1917: Texas A&M
- 1919–1920: Texas A&M

Baseball
- 1918–1920: Texas A&M
- 1922: Paris Snappers
- Positions: Halfback (football); Shortstop (baseball)

Coaching career (HC unless noted)

Football
- 1923: Austin (assistant)
- 1927: Texas A&M (assistant)
- c. 1940: SMU (freshmen)

Baseball
- 1924: Austin
- 1930–1935: Texas A&M
- 1936–1942: SMU

Head coaching record
- Overall: 105–116–3 (excluding Austin)

Accomplishments and honors

Championships
- 1 TIAA (1924); 2 SWC (1931, 1934)

Roswell Gunby "Little Hig" Higginbotham (August 15, 1898 – May 25, 1943) was an American football and baseball player and coach. He died on May 25, 1943, at Naval Air Station Quonset Point. He was the younger brother of Grady Higginbotham.

== Head coaching record ==
Record table
Season	Team	Overall	Conference	Standing	Postseason
Texas A&M Aggies (Southwest Conference) (1930–1935)
1930	Texas A&M	16–6	8–6	4th	
1931	Texas A&M	12–6	9–1	1st	
1932	Texas A&M	7–11–1	5–11	5th	
1933	Texas A&M	9–10	5–5	3rd	
1934	Texas A&M	10–7–1	9–3	1st	
1935	Texas A&M	10–8–1	5–6	2nd	
Texas A&M:		64–48–3	41–32		
SMU Mustangs (Southwest Conference) (1936–1942)
1936	SMU	3–17	2–13	6th	
1937	SMU	6–12	4–11	5th	
1938	SMU	8–6	7–6	4th	
1939	SMU	5–10	5–10	T–4th	
1940	SMU	6–7	6–7	4th	
1941	SMU	6–8	6–8	4th	
1942	SMU	7–8	7–8	T–3rd	
SMU:		41–68	37–63		
Total:		105–116–3			
National champion Postseason invitational champion Conference regular season champion Conference regular season and conference tournament champion Division regular season champion Division regular season and conference tournament champion Conference tournament champion
