= George Harper (outfielder) =

American baseball player (1892–1978)

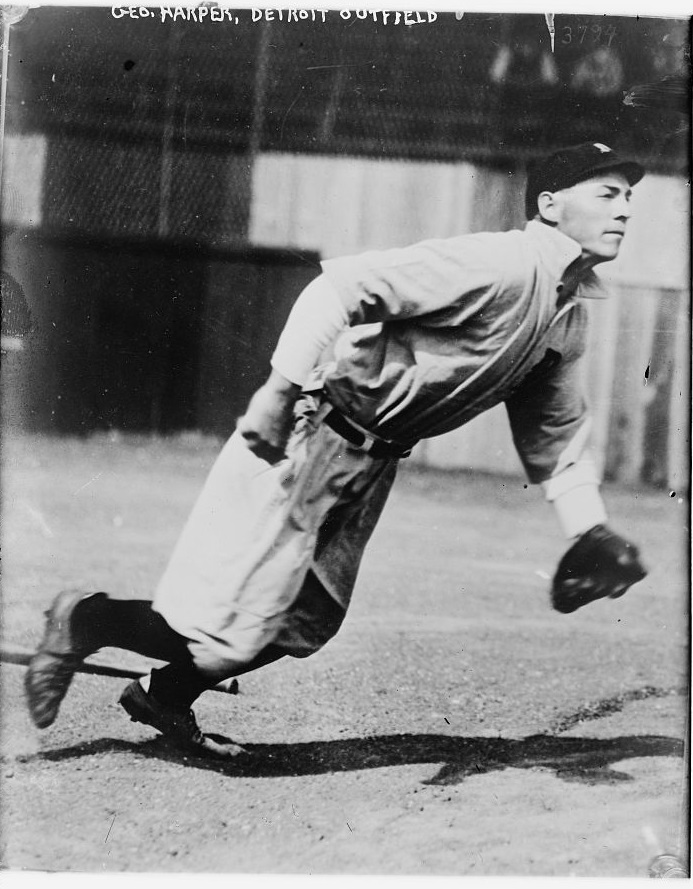
- Outfielder
- Born: June 24, 1892; Arlington, Kentucky, U.S.
- Died: August 18, 1978 (aged 86); Magnolia, Arkansas, U.S.
- Batted: Left Threw: Right

MLB debut
- April 15, 1916, for the Detroit Tigers

Last MLB appearance
- September 28, 1929, for the Boston Braves

MLB statistics
- Batting average: .303
- Home runs: 91
- Runs batted in: 530
- Stats at Baseball Reference

Teams
- Detroit Tigers (1916–1918); Cincinnati Reds (1922–1924); Philadelphia Phillies (1924–1926); New York Giants (1927–1928); St. Louis Cardinals (1928); Boston Braves (1929)

George Washington Harper (June 24, 1892 – August 18, 1978) was an American professional baseball player. From 1916 to 1929, he played as an outfielder in Major League Baseball for the Detroit Tigers, Cincinnati Reds, Philadelphia Phillies, New York Giants, St. Louis Cardinals, and Boston Braves. Harper played 1073 major league games and had a career .303 batting average with 91 home runs and 530 RBI. After his major league career ended, Harper returned to the minor leagues, where he played and managed for several more seasons.

== Early life ==
Harper was born in Arlington, Kentucky, and he attended Fordyce High School in Fordyce, Arkansas. He entered professional baseball in 1913 with the Paris Boosters of the Texas-Oklahoma League. Standing 5'8" tall and weighing 165 pounds, Harper threw right-handed and batted left-handed. He made his major league debut with the Detroit Tigers in 1916.

== Career ==
In 1917 and 1918, he played 91 games in right field for the Detroit Tigers, next to Ty Cobb in center field. Harper played right field for the Tigers as they transitioned the position from Hall of Fame member Sam Crawford to another Hall of Fame member Harry Heilmann.

After moving to the National League, Harper was three times among the league's leaders in batting average and on-base percentage: 1922, 1927 and 1928. Harper started for the 1927 Giants in place of the terminally ill Ross Youngs. Even with Youngs out, that year's Giants team had six future Hall of Famers in the starting lineup and one future Hall of Fame pitcher. Harper had a .435 on-base percentage that year, good enough for third best in the National League, but the team finished in third place.

On May 10, 1928, Harper was traded to the St. Louis Cardinals for catcher Bob O'Farrell. On September 20, the Cardinals were facing the Giants when Harper hit three home runs in one game. Writing for the North American Newspaper Alliance, Walter S. Trumbull said that Harper had likely won the pennant for St. Louis with that performance. The Cardinals went to the 1928 World Series, where they were swept by the New York Yankees. Harper appeared in three games, collecting one hit in eleven plate appearances.

He finished his career with a .303 batting average, 91 home runs, and 530 RBI. He remained active in the minor leagues through 1936 and included a year as player/manager for the El Dorado Lions of the East Dixie League in 1934. In 1935, he was well into his forties and hit .344 for El Dorado in 135 games. Before the 1936 season, he was traded from El Dorado to the Jackson Senators of the Cotton States League in exchange for a player named Doodle Rushing. The Austin Statesman advertised a baseball school that Harper was to run in March in Kilgore, Texas.

In 1936, Harper's last year playing professional baseball, he hit .297 in 118 games between the Jackson Senators and the Augusta Tigers of the South Atlantic League. By February 1937, Harper was living in Shreveport, Louisiana; he was not under contract with any team, but he indicated that he would entertain playing, managerial or executive offers in baseball.

== Later life ==
Harper died in 1978 at age 86 at a hospital in Magnolia, Arkansas, and he is buried in New Hope Cemetery. He had been inducted into the Arkansas Sports Hall of Fame eight years earlier.
