= Klondike Douglass =

American baseball player (1872–1953)

- First baseman / Catcher
- Born: May 10, 1872; Boston, Pennsylvania, U.S.
- Died: December 13, 1953 (aged 81); Bend, Oregon, U.S.
- Batted: Left Threw: Right

MLB debut
- April 23, 1896, for the St. Louis Browns

Last MLB appearance
- April 16, 1904, for the Philadelphia Phillies

MLB statistics
- Batting average: .274
- Home runs: 10
- Runs batted in: 275
- Stats at Baseball Reference

Teams
- St. Louis Browns (1896–1897); Philadelphia Phillies (1898–1904)

William Bingham "Klondike" Douglass (May 10, 1872 – December 13, 1953) was an American Major League Baseball player who split his time between first base, and at catcher for the St. Louis Browns and the Philadelphia Phillies from 1896 to 1904. A good hitter, he had a career batting average of .274, including a high of .329 in 1897.

== Early life ==
Born in Boston, Pennsylvania, Douglass was raised in Wellsville, Missouri. He played independent baseball in Missouri before ascending to professional baseball. Douglass played in the minor leagues only briefly, appearing as a player-manager for the 1895 Sherman Orphans of the Texas-Southern League.

== MLB career ==
Douglass was a left fielder when he debuted for the St. Louis Browns in 1896, but he registered a fielding percentage of only .894, and the team moved him to catcher the next season. Douglass was sent to Philadelphia in a multiplayer trade before the 1898 season, and he became the team's first baseman. Promising infielder Nap Lajoie has been the team's primary first baseman, and Lajoie was shifted to second base. Lajoie stayed at second for the rest of his career and became a Baseball Hall of Fame inductee. Douglass had his best offensive season in 1898, hitting .258 with 105 runs scored. He spent the rest of his career at catcher or first base.

== Later life ==
Klondike last appeared in the major leagues in 1904, and he played in the minor leagues until 1912. He died at the age of 81 in Bend, Oregon.
