= Greenville Togs =

American baseball team

The Greenville Togs were a Texas–Oklahoma League baseball team based in Greenville, Texas that played during the 1922 season. Notable players include Horace Allen and Tom Lovelace.
