= Rogers Hornsby =

American baseball player, coach and manager (1896–1963)

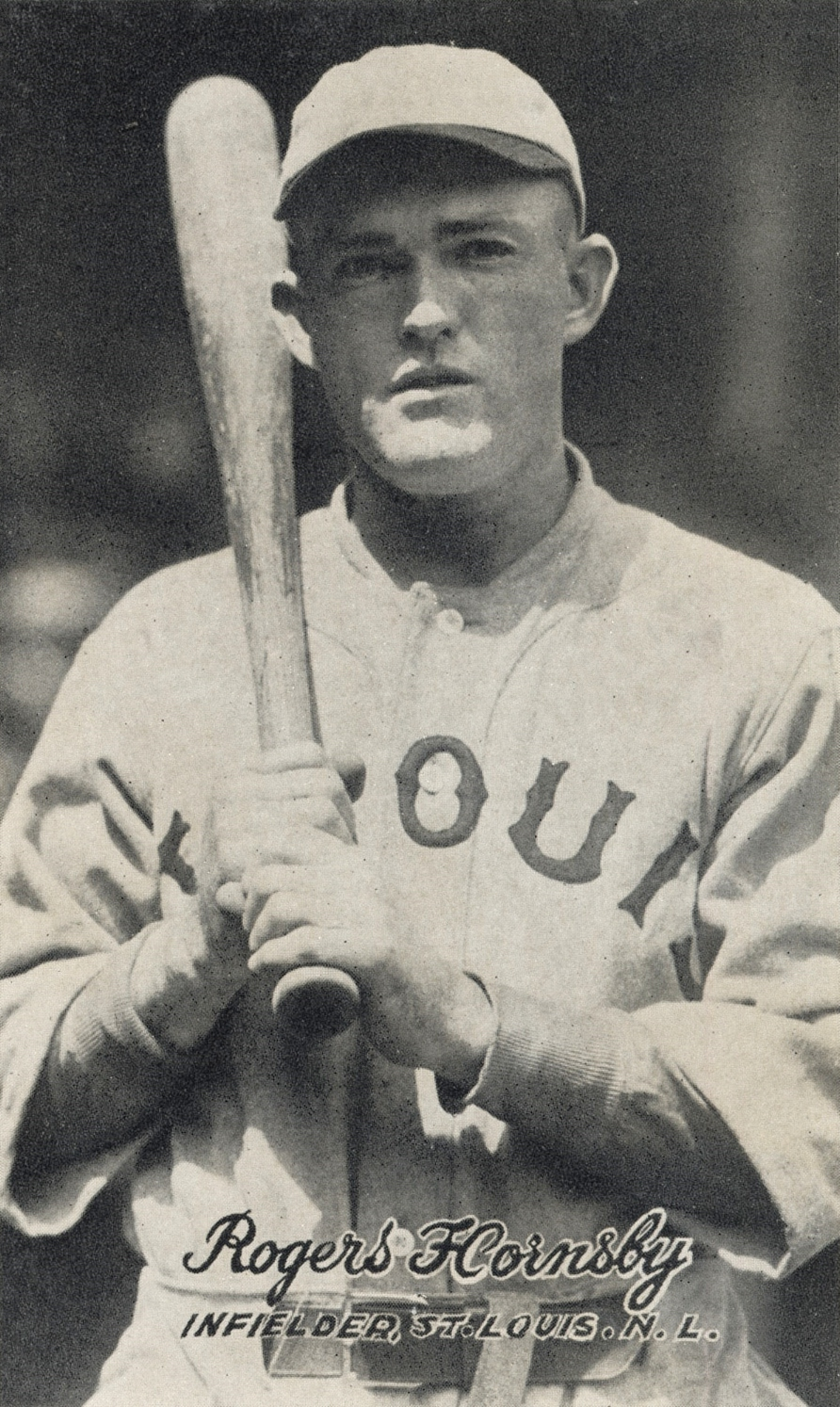
- Hornsby in 1921
- Second baseman / Manager
- Born: April 27, 1896; Winters, Texas, U.S.
- Died: January 5, 1963 (aged 66); Chicago, Illinois, U.S.
- Batted: Right Threw: Right

MLB debut
- September 10, 1915, for the St. Louis Cardinals

Last MLB appearance
- July 20, 1937, for the St. Louis Browns

MLB statistics
- Batting average: .358
- Hits: 2,930
- Home runs: 301
- Runs batted in: 1,584
- Managerial record: 701–812
- Winning %: .463
- Stats at Baseball Reference
- Managerial record at Baseball Reference

Teams
- As player: St. Louis Cardinals (1915–1926); New York Giants (1927); Boston Braves (1928); Chicago Cubs (1929–1932); St. Louis Cardinals (1933); St. Louis Browns (1933–1937); As manager: St. Louis Cardinals (1925–1926); New York Giants (1927); Boston Braves (1928); Chicago Cubs (1930–1932); St. Louis Browns (1933–1937, 1952); Cincinnati Reds (1952–1953)

Career highlights and awards
- World Series champion (1926); 2× NL MVP (1925, 1929); 2× NL Triple Crown (1922, 1925); 7× NL batting champion (1920–1925, 1928); 2× NL home run leader (1922, 1925); 4× NL RBI leader (1920–1922, 1925); Name honored by St. Louis Cardinals; St. Louis Cardinals Hall of Fame; Chicago Cubs Hall of Fame; Major League Baseball All-Century Team; Major League Baseball All-Time Team

Member of the National

Baseball Hall of Fame
- Induction: 1942
- Vote: 78.1% (fifth ballot)

Rogers Hornsby (April 27, 1896 – January 5, 1963), nicknamed "the Rajah", was an American professional baseball player, manager, and coach who played 23 seasons in Major League Baseball (MLB). He played for the St. Louis Cardinals (1915–1926, 1933), New York Giants (1927), Boston Braves (1928), Chicago Cubs (1929–1932), and St. Louis Browns (1933–1937). He was named the National League (NL)'s Most Valuable Player (MVP) twice, and was a member of one World Series championship team. Hornsby is widely regarded as one of the greatest second basemen and right-handed hitters of all time.

Born in Winters, Texas, Hornsby played for several semi-professional and minor league teams. In 1915, he began his major league career with the St. Louis Cardinals and remained with the team for 12 seasons. During this period, Hornsby won his first MVP Award and the Cardinals won the 1926 World Series. He then spent one season with the New York Giants and another with the Boston Braves before being traded to the Chicago Cubs. He played with the Cubs for four years and won his second MVP Award before the team released him in 1932. Hornsby re-signed with the Cardinals in 1933, but was released partway through the season, effectively ending his career as a full-time player. He was picked up by the St. Louis Browns and remained there until his final season in 1937, though he made only 67 appearances for them as a player. From 1925 to 1937, Hornsby was intermittently a player-manager. After retiring as a player, he managed the Browns in 1952 and the Cincinnati Reds from 1952 to 1953.

Hornsby is regarded as one of the best hitters of all time. He had 2,930 hits and 301 home runs in his career; his career batting average of .358 is fourth only to Josh Gibson, at .372, Ty Cobb, at .367, and Oscar Charleston, at .362, in MLB history. He also won two Triple Crowns and batted .400 or more three times during his career. He is the only player to hit 40 home runs and bat .400 in the same year (1922). His batting average for the 1924 season was .424, a mark that no player has matched since. In 1942, Hornsby was elected to the National Baseball Hall of Fame. In 2014, he was inducted into the St. Louis Cardinals Hall of Fame.

== Early life ==
Hornsby was born in Winters, Texas, the last of Ed and Mary (Rogers) Hornsby's six children. Hornsby was two when his father died of unknown causes. Four years later, the surviving Hornsbys moved to Fort Worth, Texas, so Hornsby's brothers could get jobs in the meat packing industry to support the family.

Hornsby started playing baseball at a very young age; he once said, "I can't remember anything that happened before I had a baseball in my hand." He took a job with the Swift and Company meat industry plant as a messenger boy when he was 10, and he also served as a substitute infielder on its baseball team. By the age of 15, Hornsby was already playing for several semi-professional teams. He also played baseball for North Side High School until 10th grade, when he dropped out to take a full-time job at Swift. While he was in high school, Hornsby also played on the football team, alongside future College Football Hall of Famer Bo McMillin.

== Professional career ==
=== Minor leagues ===
In 1914, Hornsby's older brother Everett, a minor league baseball player for many years, arranged for Rogers to get a tryout with the Texas League's Dallas Steers. He made the team, but was released two weeks later without appearing in a game. He then signed with the Hugo Scouts of the Class D Texas–Oklahoma League as their shortstop for $75 per month ($2,400 today). The team folded a third of the way through the season, and Hornsby's contract was sold to the Denison Champions of the same league for $125 ($4,000 today). Hornsby batted a combined .232 in 1914 and committed 45 errors in 113 games.

The Denison team changed its name to the Railroaders and joined the Western Association in 1915, and raised Hornsby's salary to $90 per month ($2,900 today). Hornsby's average improved to .277 in 119 games, but he made 58 errors. Nonetheless, his contributions helped the Railroaders win the Western Association pennant. At the end of the season a writer from The Sporting News said that Hornsby was one of about a dozen Western Association players to show any major league potential.

=== St. Louis Cardinals (1915–1926) ===
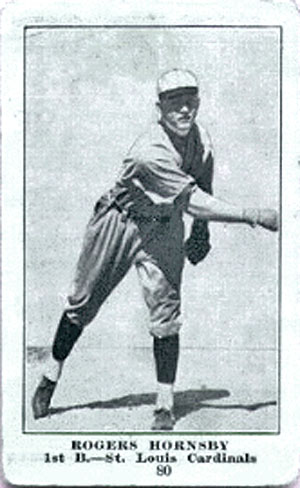
Rogers Hornsby with the St. Louis Cardinals in 1917

Hornsby came to the attention of the Major League St. Louis Cardinals during an exhibition series between that team and the Railroaders in spring training in 1915. Cardinals' manager Miller Huggins told his only scout, Bob Connery, to look for minor league players to fill the roster of their financially struggling National League team. In September, the Cardinals purchased Hornsby's contract from Denison and added him to their major league roster, although his only professional baseball experience had been in Class D. Hornsby's first game came on September 10, when he relieved Art Butler at shortstop in a 7–1 loss to the Cincinnati Reds. Three days later he started a game, and he got his first hit the next day against Rube Marquard of the Brooklyn Robins. Hornsby finished the season with a .246 average in 57 at-bats while the Cardinals finished in sixth place in the National League (NL). At only 19 years old, Hornsby was the fourth-youngest player in the NL that year.

The Cardinals picked up Roy Corhan from the San Francisco Seals of the Pacific Coast League to play at shortstop in 1916, making Hornsby one of three candidates for the position. Hornsby's great performance in spring training, a shoulder injury to Corhan, and poor hitting by Butler meant Hornsby was the starting shortstop on Opening Day. He had both runs batted in (RBIs) in the Cardinals' 2–1 victory over the Pittsburgh Pirates that day. On May 14, he hit his first major league home run against Jeff Pfeffer of Brooklyn. He rotated among infield positions before finally settling in at third base for much of the second half of the year. Late in the season, he missed 11 games with a sprained ankle. He finished 1916 with a .313 average, fourth in the NL, and he was one short of the league lead in triples with 15.

Hornsby returned to the shortstop position in 1917 after Corhan returned to San Francisco and Butler was released. After playing nearly every game throughout the first month of the season, Hornsby was called away from the team on May 29 after his brother William was shot and killed in a saloon. Rogers attended the funeral on June 1 and returned to the Cardinals on June 3, finishing the season without missing any more playing time. His batting statistics improved from the previous season; his .327 batting average was second in the league, and he led the league in triples (17), total bases (253), and slugging percentage (.484).

Many baseball players were drafted to fight in World War I in 1918, but Hornsby was given a draft deferment because he was supporting his family. During the offseason, Miller Huggins, unhappy with the Cardinals' management, left the team to manage the New York Yankees. He was replaced by Jack Hendricks, who had managed the Indianapolis Indians to a pennant in the American Association the previous year. Hornsby lacked confidence in Hendricks's ability to run the Cardinals, and the two men developed animosity towards each other as a result of Hornsby's growing egotism and fondness for former manager Huggins. Under Hendricks, Hornsby's batting average dipped to .281. He had problems off the field too; on June 17, Hornsby hit St. Louis resident Frank G. Rowe with his Buick when Rowe stepped out in front of traffic to cross an intersection. Rowe sued Hornsby for $15,000 ($320,000 today), but Hornsby eventually settled for a smaller, undisclosed amount, and the case was dismissed. He was still among the league leaders in triples and slugging percentage in 1918, but after the season ended with the Cardinals in last place, he announced that he would never play under Hendricks again. Partially due to Hornsby's complaints, Hendricks was fired after the season and replaced by Branch Rickey, then president of the Cardinals.

In 1919, after the Cardinals acquired shortstop Doc Lavan, Rickey tried converting Hornsby into a second baseman in spring training. Hornsby played third base for most of the year. His batting average was low at the beginning of the season but improved by June. At season's end, his average of .318 was second-highest in the league, and he also finished second in total bases and runs batted in.

"Hornsby is the greatest hitter I've ever had to face. I've tried to fool him every way possible, but it just cannot be done. Personally, I don't think a more skillful man ever stepped up to the plate."

— Grover Cleveland Alexander on Rogers Hornsby

In 1920, Rickey moved Hornsby to second base, where he remained for the rest of his career. He started the year with a 14-game hitting streak. On June 4, he had two triples and two RBIs as the Cardinals defeated the Chicago Cubs 5–1, a game that ended future Hall of Famer Grover Cleveland Alexander's 11-game winning streak. Hornsby finished the season with the first of seven batting titles by hitting .370, and he also led the league in on-base percentage (.431), slugging percentage (.559), hits (218), total bases (329), doubles (44), and RBIs (94).

The beginning of the live-ball era led to a spike in hitting productivity throughout the majors, which helped Hornsby to hit with increased power during the 1921 season. He hit .397 in 1921, and his 21 home runs were second in the league, more than twice his total in any previous season. He also led the league in on-base percentage (.458), slugging percentage (.639), runs scored (131), RBIs (126), doubles (44), and triples (18). The Cardinals held a special day in Hornsby's honor on September 30 before a home game against the Pittsburgh Pirates, and they presented Hornsby with multiple awards before the game, including a baseball autographed by President of the United States Warren G. Harding. The Cardinals beat the Pirates 12–4 that day as Hornsby hit a home run and had two doubles.

By the 1922 season, Hornsby was considered a big star, having led the league in batting average, hits, doubles, and runs batted in multiple times. As a result, he sought a three-year contract for $25,000 per season. After negotiating with Cardinals management he settled for three years at $18,500 ($360,000 today), which made him the highest-paid player in league history to that point. (Note: Baseball-Reference.com lists his salary as $17,500 per year.) On August 5, Hornsby set a new NL record when he hit his 28th home run of the season, off Jimmy Ring of the Philadelphia Phillies. From August 13 through September 19, he had a 33-game hitting streak. Hornsby set National League records in 1922 with 42 home runs, 250 hits and a .722 slugging percentage (still the highest ever for players with 600+ at-bats). His .401 batting average was the highest in the National League since 1897. He won the first of his two Triple Crowns that year, and he led the league in RBIs (152), on-base percentage (.459), doubles (46), and runs scored (141). His 450 total bases in 1922 remain the National League single-season record. On defense, Hornsby led all second basemen in putouts, double plays, and fielding percentage.

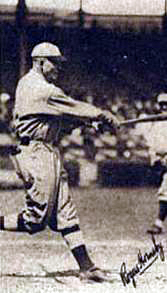
Rogers Hornsby (pictured on a 1922 baseball card) takes a swing.

On May 8, 1923, Hornsby suffered an injury to his left knee in a game against the Phillies when he turned to make a throw. He returned 10 days later, but the injury lingered, and he was removed from a game against the Pirates on May 26 to be examined by Robert Hyland, the Cardinals' physician. Hyland had Hornsby's knee placed in a cast for two weeks, after which he returned to the Cardinals. During a game in August, Hornsby was on third base late in the game and threw up his hands in disgust in response to a sign flashed by Rickey; he had given the current batter the take sign, and Hornsby felt the batter should have hit the ball. After the game, he and Rickey fought in the clubhouse, but teammates quickly broke it up. Hornsby missed several games late in the year with injuries that the Cardinals (and Hyland) did not believe to be serious; as a result he was fined $500 ($9,000 today) and suspended for the last five games of the year. However, Hornsby still won his fourth consecutive NL batting title with a batting average of .384. He also repeated as the leader in on-base percentage (.459) and slugging percentage (.627).

Hornsby raised his average to .424 in 1924, which is the fourth-highest batting average in a single season in MLB history, and the live-ball era batting average record. He led the league with 89 walks, producing a .507 on-base percentage, a National League record for over 75 years. His slugging percentage of .696 again led the league, as did his 121 runs scored, 227 hits, and 43 doubles; he hit 25 home runs as well. That year, the NL reintroduced its Most Valuable Player (MVP) award. Although Hornsby was expected to win the award, it went to Dazzy Vance instead. Cincinnati voter Jack Ryder left Hornsby's name off his ballot altogether because he believed Hornsby was an MVP on the stat sheet, but was not a team player. In 1962, the Baseball Writers' Association of America presented Hornsby with an award retroactively recognizing him as the 1924 MVP.

In 1925, Sam Breadon, the owner of the Cardinals, wished to replace Rickey as manager. Hornsby initially declined the job. After discovering that Rickey planned to sell his stock in the Cardinals if he was replaced as field manager, Hornsby agreed to take the job as long as Breadon would help him purchase the stock. Breadon agreed, and Hornsby became the Cardinals' player-manager. Hornsby finished the year with his second Triple Crown, when he combined a .403 batting average with 39 home runs and 143 RBIs in 138 games. He bested teammate Jim Bottomley in the batting title race by nearly 40 points. His 1925 batting average has not been matched by any National Leaguer since. That year, he won the MVP Award, receiving 73 out of 80 possible votes. His .756 slugging percentage and 1.245 on-base plus slugging set National League records that stood until broken by Barry Bonds in 2001. The Cardinals finished in fourth place in 1925, finishing one game over .500, though the team won 64 games and lost 51 under Hornsby. During the year, his wife Jeanette had a son, Billy.

Hornsby had an off-year offensively in 1926, as he hit only .317 with 11 home runs. The Cardinals battled through September, leading the league by a single game for most of the month. Simultaneously, Hornsby's mother's health was deteriorating in Austin, Texas which weighed on Hornsby. St. Louis won its first NL pennant, and on September 29, 1926, the eve of the World Series, Hornsby's mother passed away. Hornsby considered returning to Texas and his appearance in the Series was doubted. However he received a telegram from his uncle saying his mother had expressed her wish that Hornsby play in the Series, and the burial was delayed.

In the 1926 World Series, the Cardinals defeated the Yankees in a seven-game series. The final out of game seven came when Hornsby tagged out Babe Ruth on a stolen base attempt, giving the Cardinals their first World Series title. It would also be the only time in Hornsby's long career that he would be part of a world champion. In the series, Hornsby batted .250, with one extra base hit and 4 RBIs. Years later, Hornsby said that his tag of Ruth was the biggest thrill of his career.

During post-season negotiations for a new contract, Hornsby demanded $50,000 per year for three years. Breadon agreed to a one-year contract for $50,000 ($910,000 today), with the stipulation that Hornsby stay away from the track. When Hornsby refused to give way, the Cardinals traded him to the New York Giants for Frankie Frisch and Jimmy Ring on December 20, 1926. Indeed, Breadon had lost patience with Hornsby, even though he had led the Cardinals to their first undisputed world title. He had already arranged to send him to New York if contract talks fell through; later, Breadon said he so wanted to part ways with Hornsby that he was afraid Hornsby would call his bluff and take the one-year deal. The trade was briefly postponed as NL president John Heydler stated that Hornsby could not play for the Giants while he held stock in the Cardinals. Hornsby wanted $105 per share for his stock, a price Breadon was unwilling to pay. In early 1927, Hornsby was able to sell his shares at $105 each, enabling him to officially become a Giant.

=== New York Giants (1927) ===
Hornsby enjoyed a better season in 1927, as he hit .361 and led the league in runs scored (133), walks (86), and on-base percentage (.448). He was a player-coach, and served as acting manager for part of the year after John McGraw briefly stood down due to sinusitis. Hornsby's performance helped guide the Giants to a 92–62 win–loss record during the season, which was good enough for third place in the NL. McGraw was initially overjoyed to finally get Hornsby, having sought to trade for him at least as early as 1920. However, their relationship quickly soured due to Hornsby's overbearing personality. Additionally, his gambling problems at the race track and distrust of Giants' management annoyed team owner Charles Stoneham. During the offseason he was traded to the Boston Braves for Jimmy Welsh and Shanty Hogan.

=== Boston Braves (1928) ===
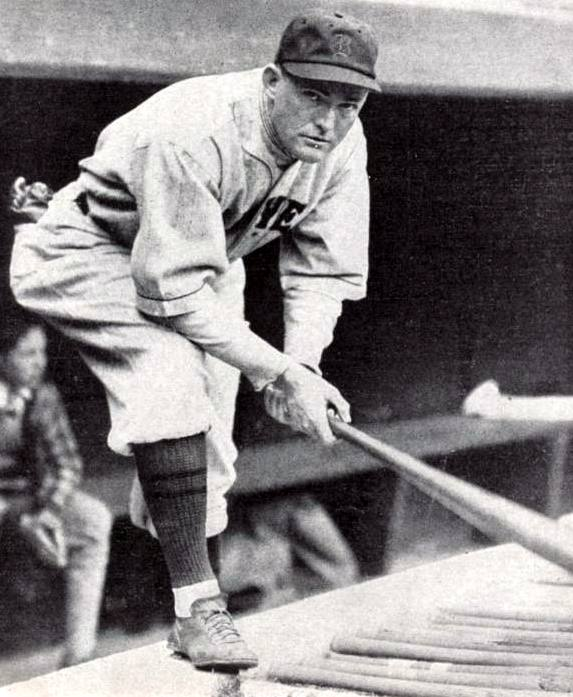
Rogers Hornsby with the Boston Braves in 1928

With the Boston Braves in 1928, Hornsby was again the league's most productive hitter; he won his seventh batting title with a .387 average, also leading the league in on-base percentage (.498), slugging percentage (.632), and walks (107). One month into the season, manager Jack Slattery resigned, and the Braves hired Hornsby to be his replacement. The Braves, however, lost 103 games and finished in seventh place out of eight teams in the NL. They were also struggling financially, and when the Chicago Cubs offered $200,000 ($3,800,000 today) and five players for Hornsby, the Braves found the offer too good to pass up. Indeed, Hornsby was well aware of the Braves' financial struggles and actually encouraged Braves owner Emil Fuchs to trade him to Chicago.

=== Chicago Cubs (1929–1932) ===
Hornsby hit .380 for Chicago in 1929 while recording 39 home runs and a league-leading .679 slugging percentage. His 156 runs scored led the major leagues and is still the team record while his .380 batting average remains the highest for a Cub since 1895. He also collected another MVP award, and the Cubs won the NL pennant. However, they lost in the 1929 World Series to the Philadelphia Athletics in five games, as Hornsby batted .238 with one RBI. He also set a World Series record for strikeouts with eight.

After the first two months of the 1930 season, Hornsby was batting .325 with two home runs. In the first game of a doubleheader against the Cardinals, Hornsby broke his ankle while advancing to third base. He did not return until August 19, and he was used mostly as a pinch-hitter for the rest of the season. With four games to go in the season, the Cubs fired manager Joe McCarthy, replacing him with Hornsby. Although there were longstanding rumors Hornsby had actively undermined McCarthy, Hornsby adamantly denied this; in fact, he and McCarthy were very close friends. Hornsby finished the year with a .308 batting average and two home runs.

On April 24, 1931, Hornsby hit three home runs and drove in eight runs in a 10–6 victory over Pittsburgh. Hornsby played in 44 of the first 48 games, but after a disappointing performance he played himself only about half the time for the rest of the year. In 100 games, he had 90 RBIs, 37 doubles, and a batting average of .331. He also led the league in on-base percentage (.421) for the ninth time in his career. The team finished 84–70, 17 games back of the pennant-winning Cardinals, and four games back of the Giants.

Hornsby was bothered by boils on his feet during the start of the 1932 season, which kept him out of the lineup until May 29. Hornsby played right field from May 29 to June 10, appeared in two games as a pinch hitter, played third base from July 14 through July 18, and played one last game as a Cub when he pinch-hit on July 31.

Cubs president William Veeck Sr. had never liked the idea of Hornsby as a manager; indeed, he briefly resigned when principal owner William Wrigley Jr. ousted McCarthy in his favor. Over the next year-and-a-half, Veeck grew increasingly dissatisfied with Hornsby, believing his autocratic managing style hurt team morale. Veeck was particularly angered when Hornsby disagreed with an umpire's call, but sent another player out to argue the call. That player was ejected from the game. Veeck believed Hornsby breached an unwritten rule of baseball which called for the manager to argue calls himself. On August 2, although the Cubs were in second place, Veeck fired Hornsby as manager and released him as a player. First baseman Charlie Grimm took over as manager for the rest of the season. Hornsby had played 19 games, batting .224 with one home run and seven RBIs. Although the Cubs advanced to the 1932 World Series, the players voted not to give Hornsby a share of money from the World Series.

=== St. Louis Cardinals (1933) ===
Hornsby did not play for the rest of 1932, but the Cardinals signed him as a player on October 24 for the 1933 season. Breadon put aside his previous disputes with Hornsby and brought him back to St. Louis, knowing that Hornsby could still handle a bat. He played regularly at second base from April 25 through May 5 in what would be his last non-cameo appearances as a player. After May 5, the Cardinals used him mostly as a pinch hitter due to numerous foot and leg problems. On July 22, Hornsby got his final NL hit in a 9–5 loss to the Braves. Through July 23, Hornsby was batting .325 with two home runs and 21 RBIs. However, that day, the Cardinals waived him. By this time, the Cardinals were in fifth place and long out of the pennant race, and Breadon was concerned that Hornsby was no longer able to play regularly.

=== St. Louis Browns (1933–1937) ===
Hornsby was claimed by the last-place St. Louis Browns of the American League on July 26. The Browns immediately named him player-manager; Bill Killefer had just resigned as manager, and Browns owner Phil Ball wanted Hornsby as a replacement. It would be one of Ball's last acts before his death in October. Hornsby appeared in 11 games for the Browns. He had three hits, including a home run, in nine at-bats. The Browns finished in last place in the AL. That year, Hornsby began operating a baseball school in Hot Springs, Arkansas, which he ran on and off between 1933 and 1951 with various associates. He played in a total of 57 games in 1933; he would never play in as much as 30 games in a season again.

Rogers Hornsby was honored alongside the retired numbers of the St. Louis Cardinals in 1997.

In 1934, Hornsby appeared in 24 games, but started only two of them–one at third base, and the other in right field. In all of his other appearances, he was a pinch hitter. For the season, he batted .304 with one home run and 11 RBIs. The Browns improved on their previous season, finishing in sixth place out of eight teams in the AL.

Hornsby played in 10 games in the 1935 season, starting in four. From April 16 through April 21, he started at first base, and he started at third base on May 22. He finished the year with five hits and a .208 average, while the Browns slipped to seventh place. The regression came in part because Ball's estate, which was running the Browns pending a sale, refused to infuse badly needed capital into the team. The Browns had to sell promising players in order to pay the bills–a pattern that would continue throughout Hornsby's tenure with the Browns.

Hornsby appeared in only two games with the team during the 1936 season. On May 31, his pinch-hit single in the ninth inning gave the Browns an 11–10 win over the Detroit Tigers. In his other appearance on June 9, he played first base in a 5–3 win over the Yankees. The Browns again finished in seventh place. After the season, Hornsby publicly decried his team's lack of talent. He also claimed Ball's estate made it difficult to enforce discipline.

In the winter of 1936, the Ball estate sold the Browns to Donald Lee Barnes, who retained Hornsby as manager on Rickey's advice. In 1937, Hornsby played in 20 games. On April 21, in his first game of the year, Hornsby hit the final home run of his career in a 15–10 victory over the Chicago White Sox. On July 5, he had the final hit of his career in a 15–4 loss in the second game of a doubleheader with the Cleveland Indians.

On July 20, Hornsby appeared in what would be his final game, a 5–4 loss to the Yankees. A day later, the last-place Browns fired Hornsby as manager and released him as a player. Accounts differ on the circumstances that led to his ouster. According to the Society for American Baseball Research, Barnes had lost patience with Hornsby's compulsive gambling, and fired him after learning that Hornsby was actually placing horse racing bets during a game. However, according to biographer Charles C. Alexander, Hornsby won $35,000 ($780,000 today) from betting on a race on July 15. When he tried to use $4,000 of this money to pay off a debt to Barnes, Barnes refused to accept it, since it had come from a bookmaker. Hornsby protested to Barnes, "The money is as good as the money you take from people in the loan-shark business. It's better than taking interest from widows and orphans". Barnes released him five days later. Hornsby finished the 1937 season with a .321 batting average and 18 hits in 20 games, and was the oldest player in the AL that season.

== Later baseball career ==
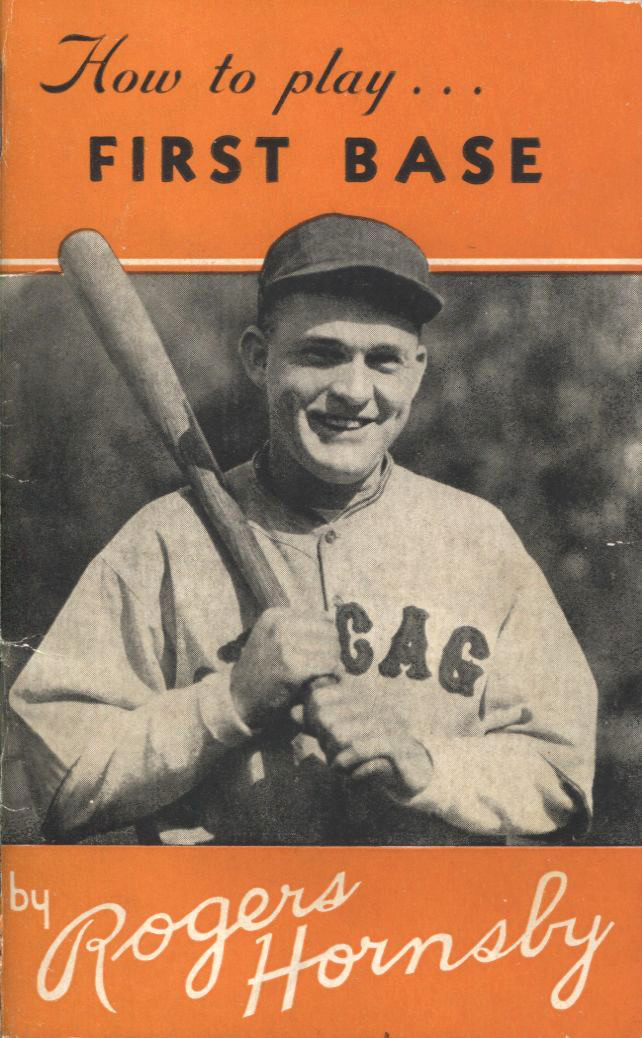
How to Play First Base by Rogers Hornsby

Following his release from the Browns, Hornsby was unable to retire because he had lost so much money gambling over the years. He signed as a player-coach with the Baltimore Orioles of the International League in 1938 before leaving them to play for and manage the Chattanooga Lookouts of the Southern Association for the rest of the season. Hornsby then returned to the Orioles to manage them for 1939, but he did not return to the club following the season.

Halfway through 1940, he signed to manage the Oklahoma City Indians of the Texas League. Hornsby led them from last place to the Texas League playoffs, where they fell to the Houston Buffaloes in four games. Hornsby began 1941 managing the Indians once again, but he resigned in the middle of the season. In November, he became the general and field manager of the Fort Worth Cats, also of the Texas league. Fort Worth finished in third place and made the playoffs in 1942, but they were eliminated in the first round by the Shreveport Sports. The league decided to suspend operations for the duration of World War II in 1943.

In February 1944, Hornsby signed as a player-manager with the Azules de Veracruz of the Mexican League for the coming season. Hornsby won two games inserting himself as a pinch hitter in the ninth inning, including one occasion in which he drove in three runs with a bases-loaded double. His tenure in Mexico ended after only nine days, however, owing to financial differences with team owner Jorge Pasquel. Hornsby announced:

I'm perfectly willing to keep my own agreements if the other fellow keeps his, but in this case it's hopeless. I found out that I'd even have to pay my expenses on road trips, and that's unheard of. The management finally consented to pay my expenses but there were many other matters to iron out. I finally gave up.

Hornsby indicated plans to return to Fort Worth, Texas.

Following his return to the United States, Hornsby spent 1945 out of baseball for the first time in 31 years. There were rumors that Commissioner Kenesaw Mountain Landis had informally blackballed him from the majors because of his persistent gambling. However, Hornsby had a long wait to get another full-time major-league job even after Landis died in November 1944. He did some commentary for radio station WTMV in East St. Louis, Illinois, served as a spring-training hitting instructor for the Chicago White Sox in 1946 and the Cleveland Indians in 1947, and became a TV announcer for Chicago Cubs games in 1949.

Hornsby did not become a manager or coach again until 1950, when he was hired to manage the Texas League's Beaumont Roughnecks. He led the Roughnecks to the pennant, but they were swept in the first round of the playoffs by the San Antonio Missions. The next year, in 1951, Hornsby managed the Seattle Rainiers of the Pacific Coast League. Under Hornsby's leadership, the Rainiers won the pennant.

=== St. Louis Browns (1952) ===
With Hornsby's success in Beaumont and Seattle, both of St. Louis' major-league teams offered him three-year contracts. He decided to return to the Browns, apparently believing there was a greater upside to rebuilding a perennial loser than there was to managing a perennial contender. The Browns' owner, Bill Veeck, was the son of former Cubs president William Veeck Sr. Hornsby was not well received by the players, however. He reportedly spoke to players only to criticize them. As the season wore on and the losses piled up, Hornsby's fuse became even shorter.

On June 9, he was fired after a disagreement with Veeck over an incident against the Yankees the day before. During the game, a fan prevented Gil McDougald of the Yankees from catching a fly ball, and the umpire ruled that it was fan interference. Hornsby did not initially argue the call, coming out of the dugout only on orders from Veeck (when it was already too late to do anything about it). This led to Hornsby and the Browns parting ways. The Browns players were so happy about Hornsby's firing that they gave Veeck an engraved trophy to thank him.

=== Cincinnati Reds (1952–1953) ===
A little over a month later, on July 26, Hornsby was hired to replace Luke Sewell as manager of the Cincinnati Reds. The Reds went 27–23 for the rest of the season. However, late in a lackluster 1953 season, the Reds announced that he would not return for 1954. He resigned with eight games to go in the season; coach Buster Mills replaced him. He finished his MLB managerial career with a record of 701–812.

Following his dismissal from the Reds, Hornsby worked as a coach for the Cubs from 1958 to 1960 before becoming a scout and third base coach for the New York Mets in 1962.

== Managerial record ==
Team	Year	Regular season					Postseason			
Team	Year	Games	Won	Lost	Win %	Finish	Won	Lost	Win %	Result
STL	1925	115	64	51	.557	4th in NL	–	–	–	–
STL	1926	154	89	65	.578	1st in NL	4	3	.571	Won World Series (NYY)
STL total		269	153	116	.569		4	3	.571	
NYG	1927	32	22	10	.688	3rd in NL	–	–	–	–
NYG total		32	22	10	.688		0	0	–	
BSN	1928	122	39	83	.320	7th in NL	–	–	–	–
BSN total		122	39	83	.320		0	0	–	
CHC	1930	4	4	0	1.000	2nd in NL	–	–	–	–
CHC	1931	154	84	70	.545	3rd in NL	–	–	–	–
CHC	1932	99	53	46	.535	(fired)	–	–	–	–
CHC total		257	141	116	.549		0	0	–	
SLB	1933	52	19	33	.365	8th in AL	–	–	–	–
SLB	1934	152	67	85	.441	6th in AL	–	–	–	–
SLB	1935	152	65	87	.428	7th in AL	–	–	–	–
SLB	1936	152	57	95	.375	7th in AL	–	–	–	–
SLB	1937	77	25	52	.325	(fired)	–	–	–	–
SLB	1952	51	22	29	.431	(fired)	–	–	–	–
SLB total		636	255	381	.401		0	0	–	
CIN	1952	51	27	24	.529	6th in NL	–	–	–	–
CIN	1953	146	64	82	.438	(resigned)	–	–	–	–
CIN total		197	91	106	.462		0	0	–	
Total		1,513	701	812	.463		4	3	.571	

== Legacy ==
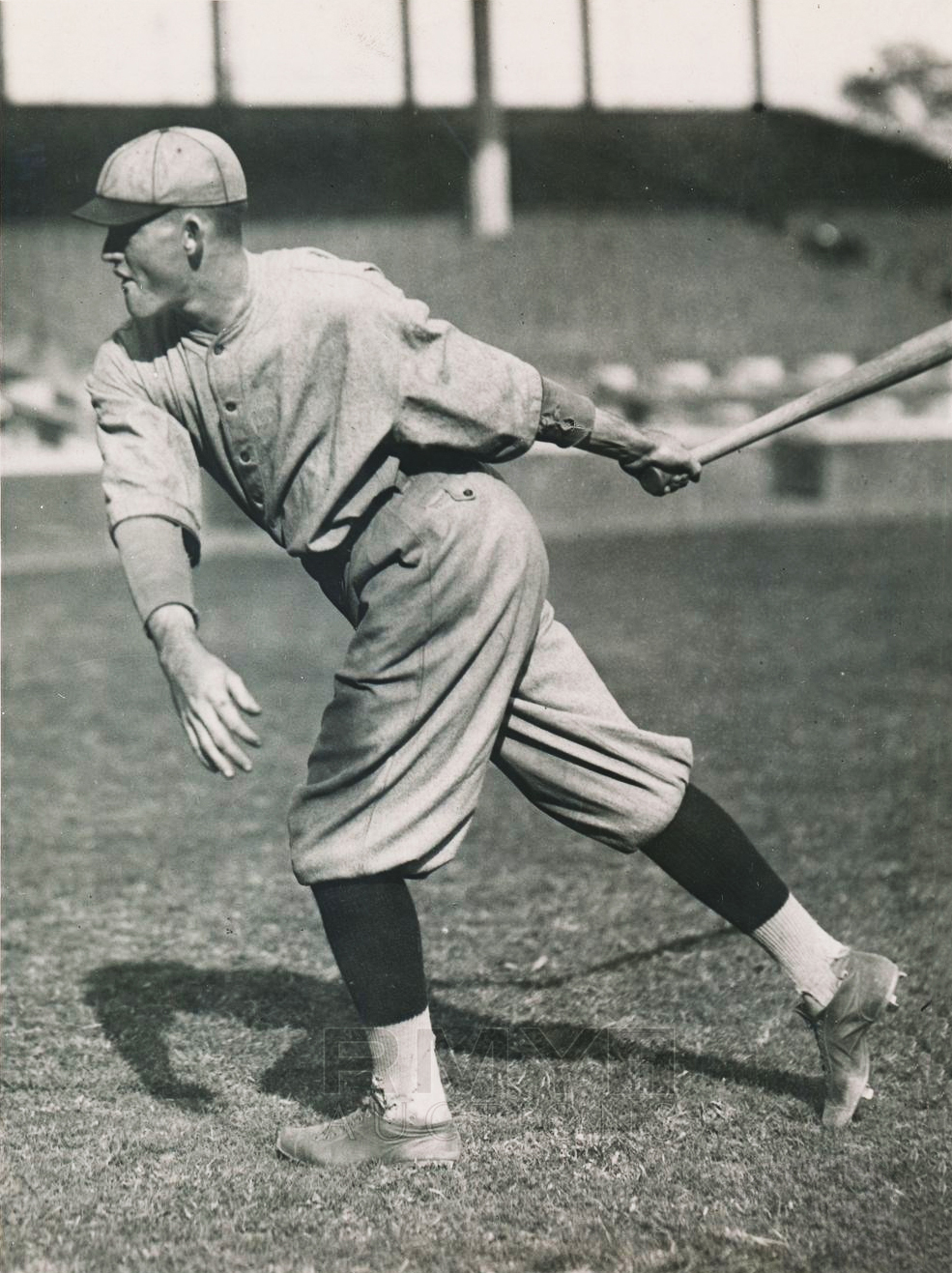
Hornsby in 1920

Baseball experts and sportswriters consider Hornsby to be one of the greatest hitters of all time. His lifetime batting average of .358 is only exceeded by Ty Cobb's career mark of .366, and Oscar Charleston's .364. He won seven batting titles in total, number three all-time at the time of his retirement, and a feat tied or exceeded by only five players (Cobb [11 or 12, depending on the source], Tony Gwynn [8], Honus Wagner [8], Rod Carew [7], and Stan Musial [7]). Hornsby led the National League in slugging percentage nine times, a record that still stands. He also hit more home runs, drove in more runs, and had a higher batting average than any other National League player during the 1920s, which makes him one of four players in baseball history (along with Honus Wagner, Ted Williams, and Albert Pujols) to win a decade "triple crown". He hit a career total of 301 home runs and was the first player to reach 300 while playing mostly in the National League. His 264 home runs as a second baseman was a major league record for that position until Joe Morgan surpassed him in 1984. Hornsby was also a very consistent hitter whether he was playing at home or on the road. His lifetime home batting average was .359, and his lifetime away batting average was .358. Ted Williams, who had the highest career batting average since Hornsby, said that Hornsby was the greatest hitter for power and average in baseball, and Frankie Frisch said of him, "He's the only guy I know who could hit .350 in the dark." Hornsby also holds second place on the unofficial major league record list of "consecutive games with two or more hits" with 13 games, two behind Count Campau, a nineteenth-century player who retired in 1894. Hornsby is only the second right-handed batter in history to hit over .400 three times and is considered, according to the Los Angeles Times, to be the greatest right-handed hitter in history. He led the National League in batting average, on-base percentage, slugging percentage, and total bases every year from 1920 to 1925.

Rogers Hornsby was so respected as a hitter that once, when a rookie pitcher complained to umpire Bill Klem that he thought he had thrown Rogers a strike, Klem replied, "Son, when you pitch a strike, Mr. Hornsby will let you know."

Line-Up for Yesterday

H is for Hornsby;
When pitching to Rog,
The pitcher would pitch,
Then the pitcher would dodge.

— Ogden Nash, SPORT (January 1949)

Hornsby was also renowned for his speed, and was considered to be the fastest player in the National League in his prime. He did not try to steal very often but used his speed to take extra bases. Between 1916 and 1927 Hornsby had 30 inside-the-park home runs, and he led the league with 17 triples in 1917 and 18 triples in 1921; he had 20 triples in 1920.

Hornsby never went to movies or read books, convinced that it would harm a batter's eyesight, and he never smoked or drank. He was notoriously difficult to get along with, a major reason he changed teams so frequently in the last decade of his career. He usually left due to falling out with the front office. Most of the players he managed did not like him due to his insistence that others follow his lifestyle, although some (like Woody English and Clint Courtney) did. As one contemporary writer put it, "Hornsby knew more about baseball and less about diplomacy than any player I knew." Hornsby never played cards, but he did bet frequently on horse races, and he lost more than he won. His compulsive gambling was often a factor in his dismissal from a team; by one account, he lost at least one managerial job for placing a bet during a game. He was forced to play in the minors well into his 40s to make up for losing so much money on bets that went sour.

By most contemporary accounts, he was at least as mean and nasty as Cobb, who was known in his time for his aggressive attitude and dirty play. He received attention for deciding to play in the 1926 World Series and honor his dying mother's wish rather than go to her bedside; Hornsby asked that her body be held for funeral services after the Series ended. "Some thought it was heartless," wrote Fred Lieb, "but it was just like Rogers Hornsby."

Hornsby was elected into the National Baseball Hall of Fame in 1942. In 1999, Hornsby was ranked ninth on The Sporting News list of Baseball's Greatest Players. Later that year, he was named to the Major League Baseball All-Century Team. In 2001, writer Bill James ranked him as the 22nd-greatest player and the third-greatest second baseman in baseball history, while at the same time documenting his unpopularity and his difficult personality. He is also tied for eighth overall with Stan Musial in wins above replacement for position players. Hornsby has also been recognized on the St. Louis Walk of Fame. In January 2014, the Cardinals announced Hornsby among 22 former players and personnel to be inducted into the St. Louis Cardinals Hall of Fame for the inaugural class of 2014. The San Antonio–Austin metroplex chapter of the Society for American Baseball Research is named in honor of Hornsby.

== Personal life ==
On September 23, 1918, Hornsby married Sarah Elizabeth Martin, whom he had known since he played for the Denison Railroaders, in Philadelphia. They had a son, Rogers Hornsby Jr., on November 15, 1920. Rogers Jr. died in a plane crash on December 23, 1949, near Savannah, Georgia.

During 1922 he began seeing Jeanette Pennington Hine, who was married to an automobile-supply salesman named John Hine. On June 12, 1923, Hornsby divorced Sarah, and Hine divorced her spouse in 1923 as well; the two were married on February 28, 1924. As a result of the divorce, Sarah took custody of Rogers Jr.

Hornsby and Jeanette had a son, Billy, on June 2, 1925. Billy played baseball for several years in the minor leagues, but never reached the majors. Hornsby and Jeanette became estranged in December 1944, and Hornsby began seeing a woman named Bernadette Harris, whom he called his "personal good friend and secretary", in 1945. They lived together after 1948. Harris died of suicide when she jumped out of a third-story window on September 7, 1953. Her suicide was attributed to depression. Following Jeanette's death on June 1, 1956, Hornsby married Marjorie Bernice Frederick Porter on January 27, 1957. They remained together until Hornsby's death. In 1963, Hornsby died of a heart attack. He was buried in Hornsby Bend Cemetery near Austin, Texas.

== See also ==
- List of St. Louis Cardinals team records
- List of Major League Baseball annual doubles leaders
- List of Major League Baseball doubles records
- List of Major League Baseball hit records
- List of Major League Baseball player-managers
- List of Major League Baseball career triples leaders
- List of Major League Baseball career runs scored leaders
- List of Major League Baseball career runs batted in leaders
- List of Major League Baseball career hits leaders
- List of Major League Baseball career doubles leaders
- List of Major League Baseball career home run leaders
