= Jimmie Humphries =

American professional baseball player, manager, and executive

- Humphries in 1955
- Infielder / Manager / Owner
- Born: November 17, 1890 (Note: Date of birth of November 17, 1890, is per his draft registration card of April 1942, which he signed. Online photos of his gravestone show it lists that date. His entry in the Social Security Death Index has it as November 17, 1889. Baseball-Reference.com lists December 23, 1889.); Waco, Texas, US
- Died: September 10, 1971 (aged 80); Fort Worth, Texas, US
- Batted: Unknown Threw: Unknown (Note: Baseball middle infielders, such as Humphries, almost always throw right-handed.)
- Stats at Baseball Reference

Elija James Humphries (November 17, 1890 – September 10, 1971) was an American professional baseball player, manager and executive. He was a longtime figure in minor league baseball in Oklahoma City, Oklahoma.

== Biography ==
Humphries' playing career in professional baseball spanned 1907 to 1918. (Note: Per existing records, Humphries did not play professionally during 1909 or 1910, although minor league records from this era can be incomplete.) A second baseman and shortstop, he had a career-best .277 batting average in 1916, compiling 136 hits in 136 games with the McAlester Miners of the Western Association, although batting records for multiple of his seasons are incomplete. He appeared in at least 376 minor league games during a 10-season playing career.

Humphries was a player-manager with the Bonham Boosters in 1911, the Sherman Cubs in 1912, the Sherman Lions in 1913, and the McAlester Miners from 1915 to 1917. He led the Miners to a first-place finish in 1917.

In 1919, Humphries was hired as the Oklahoma City Indians team secretary and in 1920, he briefly managed the team. He served as the team's business manager in the 1930s and 1940s, and in 1948, he became the team's president. In 1951, Humphries bought the franchise and became its owner. He signed pitcher Bill Greason in 1952, making Greason the second African American player in the Texas League. Humphries owned the team through 1957; it folded when the Texas League reorganized after that season. All told, Humphries was with the Oklahoma City Indians for 39 years, "one of the longest careers with a single franchise in baseball history."

In 1958, Humphries moved his franchise to Corpus Christi, Texas, to become the Corpus Christi Giants, and remained owner. He later had a stake in the Victoria Giants of the Texas League.

Humphries was born in Waco, Texas, and attended Baylor University. He died in Fort Worth, Texas, in September 1971, and was interred at Rose Hill Cemetery there.
