= Denison Blue Sox =

American franchise in minor league baseball

Denison Katydids / Blue Sox / Champions
- 1912–1914; Denison, Texas

Minor league affiliations
- Class: D
- League: Texas–Oklahoma League

Team data
- Name: Denison Katydids (1912); Denison Blue Sox (1913); Denison Champions (1914)

The city of Denison, Texas, hosted a franchise in minor league baseball that competed in the Texas–Oklahoma League for three seasons, under the names Denison Katydids, Denison Blue Sox and Denison Champions. They competed as the Katydids in 1912, as the Blue Sox in 1913, and as the Champions in 1914. Starting in 1915, the city of Denison would host a team in the Western Association, the Denison Railroaders.

The Katydids of 1912 had at least one player who went on to compete in the major leagues, pitcher Jim Haislip. Records for the team are largely incomplete. Horace H. Covington, brother of Tex Covington and Sam Covington, managed the team.

The Blue Sox of 1913 had at least two players who went on to compete in the major leagues; Haislip and first baseman Sam Covington. Pitcher Rick Adams had played in the major leagues in 1905. The Blue Sox were managed by Babe Peebles, who would continue to manage teams in Denison through 1917.

The Champions of 1914 had several past or future major league players: pitchers Adams, Haislip, and Walt Kinney, along with position players Fred Nicholson and Hall of Fame inductee Rogers Hornsby.
