= Gorman's Park =

Baseball park in Cleburne, Texas, US

Coordinates: 32°20′26″N 97°23′13″W

Gorman's Park was a baseball park located in Cleburne, Texas and was the home of the Texas League Cleburne Railroaders in 1906. Controversially, the Railroaders won the Texas League pennant over Fort Worth. Fort Worth won the first half while Cleburne won the second half. However, Cleburne won the title because Fort Worth's players were not available to play in the championship after the regular season. The venue was located at the crossing of Hillsboro and Westhill in Hulen Park.

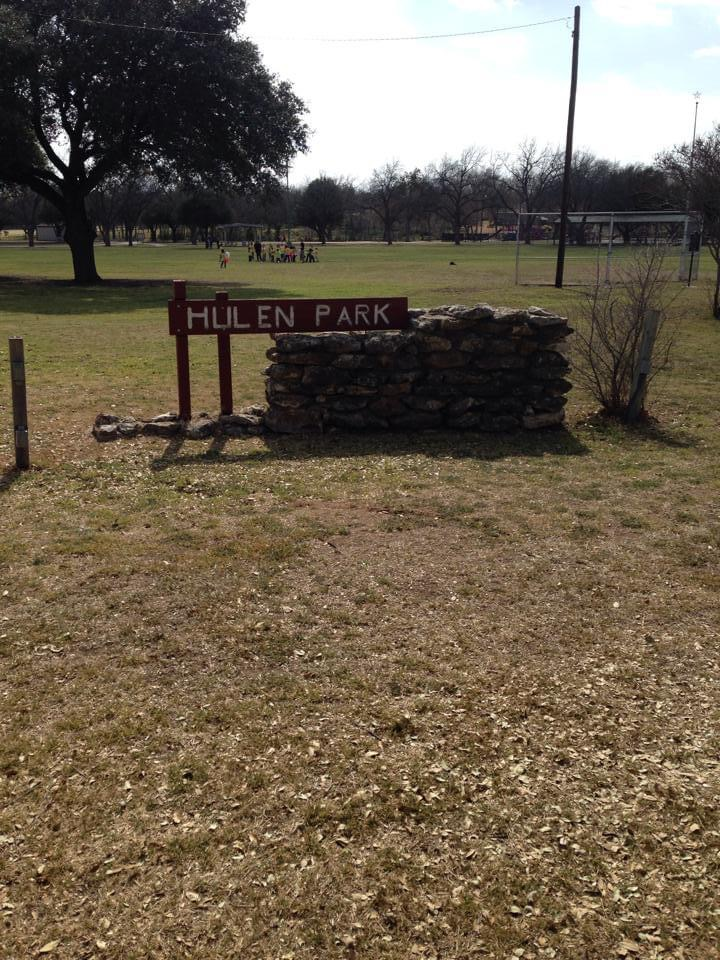
Hulen Park sign behind the home plate at the former Gorman's Park
