= Temple Boll Weevils =

- 1905–1907; Temple, Texas

Minor league affiliations
- Class: Class C, Class D
- League: Texas League, South Texas League

Team data
- Previous parks: Cotton Yard (now Baker Field)

The Temple Boll Weevils were a minor league baseball team which played their home games at the Cotton Yards (now Baker Field) in Temple, Texas as a member of the Texas League from 1905 to 1907. Local newspapers took to calling them the "Cotton Bugs," a nickname coined by the Galveston Daily News.

== History ==
The team finished with a record of 71-59 in its debut season in 1905, behind the Fort Worth Panthers by just a half game for second place in the league. After Temple got off to a slow start in the following season and Temple manager Con Lucid resigned, owner J.E. Edens sold the team to the Temple Baseball Association, a local stock company headed by Temple mayor Fred P. Hamill, who replaced Lucid with manager Fred Moore. With the Texas League struggling financially, it decided in mid-season to drop the Boll Weevils. The Temple Baseball Association, having only recently spent $3,000 to buy the team, filed an unsuccessful lawsuit against the league. In 1907 the Texas League took on several teams from the South Texas League and resurrected another incarnation of the Boll Weevils with players being contributed by the other teams. Due in part to poor performance and lacking fan support, 1907 would be their final season.
