= Walt Kinney =

American baseball player (1893–1971)

- Pitcher
- Born: September 9, 1893; Denison, Texas, U.S.
- Died: July 1, 1971 (aged 77); Escondido, California, U.S.
- Batted: Left Threw: Left

MLB debut
- July 26, 1918, for the Boston Red Sox

Last MLB appearance
- May 9, 1923, for the Philadelphia Athletics

MLB statistics
- Win–loss record: 11-20
- Earned run average: 3.59
- Strikeouts: 129
- Stats at Baseball Reference

Teams
- Boston Red Sox (1918); Philadelphia Athletics (1919–1920, 1923)

Walter William Kinney (September 9, 1893 – July 1, 1971) was an American pitcher in Major League Baseball who played for the Boston Red Sox (1918) and Philadelphia Athletics (1919–20, 1923). Kinney batted and threw left-handed. He was born in Denison, Texas.

In a four-season career, Kinney posted an 11–20 record with 129 strikeouts and a 3.59 earned run average in 290 2/3 innings pitched.

He was a better than average hitting pitcher, posting a .280 batting average (35-for-125) with 17 runs, 2 home runs, 18 RBI and 12 bases on balls.

Kinney died in Escondido, California, at the age of 77.
