= Joe Pate =

American baseball player (1892-1948)

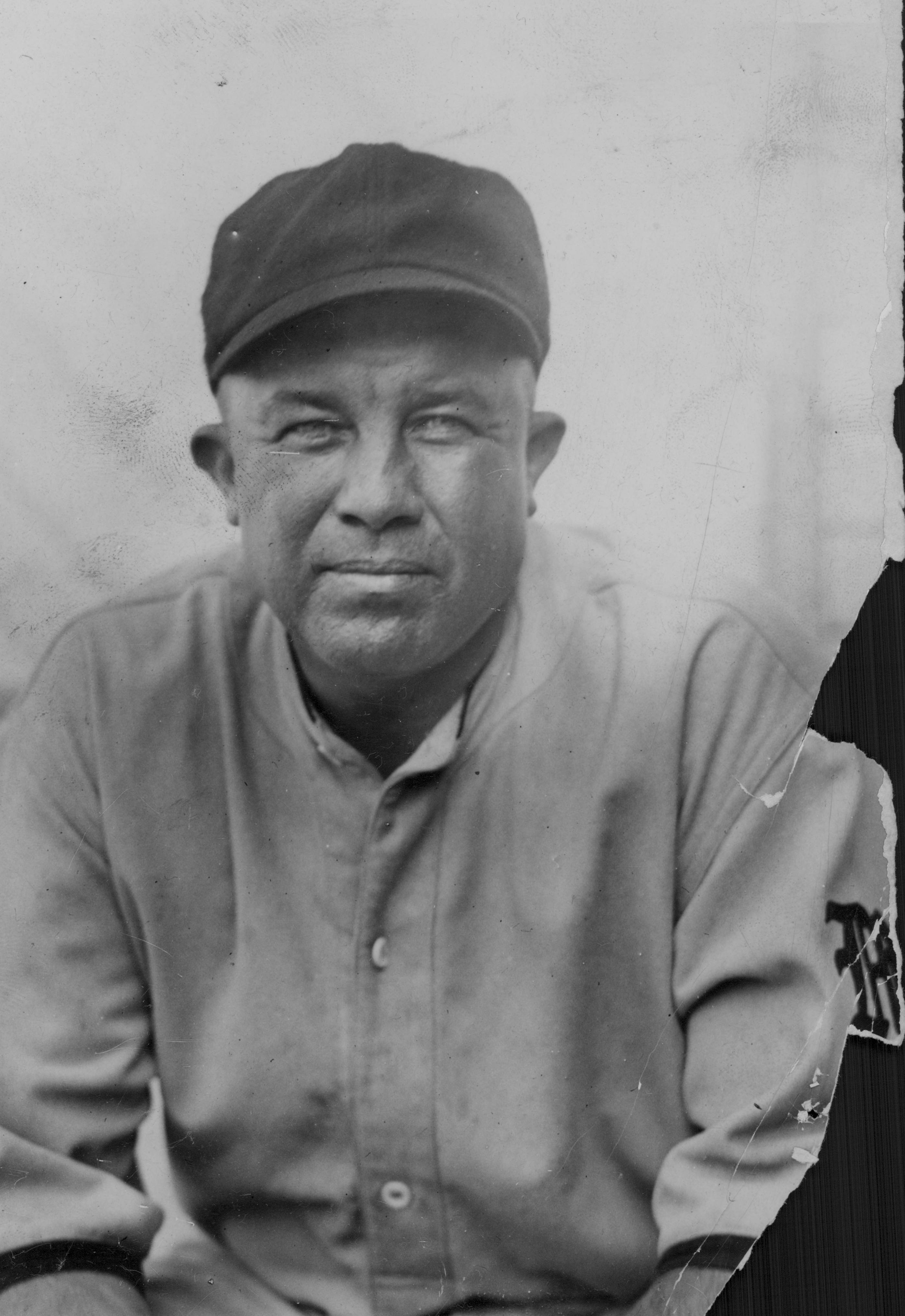
- Pitcher
- Born: June 6, 1892; Alice, Texas, U.S.
- Died: December 26, 1948 (aged 56); Fort Worth, Texas, U.S.
- Batted: Left Threw: Left

MLB debut
- April 15, 1926, for the Philadelphia Athletics

Last MLB appearance
- July 19, 1927, for the Philadelphia Athletics

MLB statistics
- Win–loss record: 9–3
- Earned run average: 3.51
- Strikeouts: 38
- Saves: 12
- Stats at Baseball Reference

Teams
- Philadelphia Athletics (1926–1927)

Joseph William Pate (June 6, 1892 – December 26, 1948) was an American professional baseball player. He was a left-handed pitcher over parts of two seasons (1926–1927) with the Philadelphia Athletics. For his career, he compiled a 9-3 record, with a 3.51 earned run average, 12 saves, and 38 strikeouts in 166 2/3 innings pitched.

An alumnus of Tulane University, he was born in Alice, Texas and died in Fort Worth, Texas at the age of 56.
