= Joe Connor (baseball) =

American baseball player (1874–1957)

- Catcher
- Born: December 8, 1874; Waterbury, Connecticut, U.S.
- Died: November 8, 1957 (aged 82); Waterbury, Connecticut, U.S.
- Batted: Right Threw: Right

MLB debut
- September 9, 1895, for the St. Louis Browns

Last MLB appearance
- October 7, 1905, for the New York Highlanders

MLB statistics
- Hits: 54
- Batting average: .199
- Home runs: 1
- Stats at Baseball Reference

Teams
- St. Louis Browns (1895); Boston Beaneaters (1900); Milwaukee Brewers (1901); Cleveland Blues (1901); New York Highlanders (1905)

Joseph Francis Connor (December 8, 1874 – November 8, 1957) was an American right-handed Major League Baseball catcher. A native of Waterbury, Connecticut, he played for four seasons in Major League Baseball, including stints with the St. Louis Browns in 1895, the Boston Beaneaters in 1900, the Milwaukee Brewers and Cleveland Blues in 1901, and the New York Highlanders in 1905.

== Major league career ==
Joe Connor made his major league debut with the St. Louis Browns at Robison Field on September 9, 1895, and spent the 1895 season playing alongside his brother, Roger Connor. At the end his rookie season, Connor didn't play major league baseball again for five years, when he was released from the St. Louis Browns in 1900. Before the 1901 season, Connor played for the Boston Beaneaters. Connor also played for the Milwaukee Brewers in the 1901 season. On July 22, 1901, Connor was released by the Milwaukee Brewers. Only four days later, on July 26, he signed as a free agent with the Cleveland Blues. In 1905, he played his last season of major league baseball. In September 1905, the Cleveland Blues loaned Connor to the New York Highlanders. Conner played his final Major League Baseball game on October 7, 1905.

== After retirement ==
His brother, Roger Connor, also played major league baseball, and was inducted into the Hall of Fame in 1976. Combinations of major league brothers have only happened about 350 times. His brother was called the 19th century's home run king, and he was the first Major League Baseball player to hit an over-the-wall home run at the Polo Grounds baseball stadium.

After baseball, Connor worked as a messenger for the Connecticut Superior Court in Waterbury, Connecticut from 1935–1946. He also worked as a roofer and a packaging department employee. Connor died at his home at 77 Plaza Avenue in Waterbury on the evening of November 8, 1957. His burial was held at Old St. Joseph's Cemetery in Waterbury on November 11.
