= Jim Haislip =

American baseball player (1891-1970)

- Pitcher
- Born: August 4, 1891; Farmersville, Texas, U.S.
- Died: January 26, 1970 (aged 78); Dallas, Texas, U.S.
- Batted: Left Threw: Left

MLB debut
- August 27, 1913, for the Philadelphia Phillies

Last MLB appearance
- August 27, 1913, for the Philadelphia Phillies

MLB statistics
- Record: 0-0
- ERA: 6.00
- Strikeouts: 0
- Stats at Baseball Reference

Teams
- Philadelphia Phillies (1913)

James Clifton Haislip (August 4, 1891 – January 26, 1970) was an American Major League Baseball pitcher. Haislip played for the Philadelphia Phillies in 1913.
