= Bill Stellbauer =

American baseball player (1894-1974)

- Left fielder
- Born: March 20, 1894; Bremond, Texas, U.S.
- Died: February 16, 1974 (aged 79); New Braunfels, Texas, U.S.
- Batted: Right Threw: Right

MLB debut
- April 12, 1916, for the Philadelphia Athletics

Last MLB appearance
- June 16, 1916, for the Philadelphia Athletics

MLB statistics
- Batting average: .271
- Home runs: 0
- Runs batted in: 5
- Stats at Baseball Reference

Teams
- Philadelphia Athletics (1916)

William Jennings Stellbauer (March 20, 1894 – February 16, 1974) was an American Major League Baseball outfielder who played in 1916 with the Philadelphia Athletics. He batted and threw right-handed. Stellbauer had a .271 batting average in 25 games, 13 hits in 48 at-bats, in his one-year career.

He was born in Bremond, Texas and died in New Braunfels, Texas.
