= Ed Appleton =

American baseball player (1892-1932)

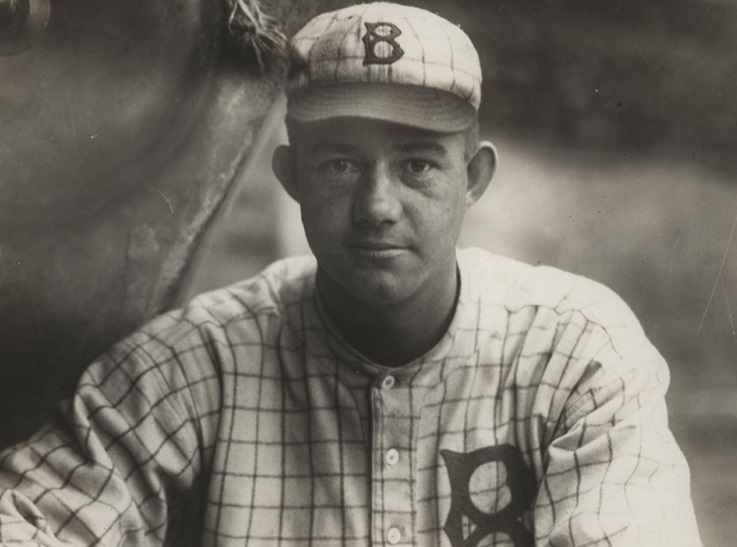
- Pitcher
- Born: February 29, 1892; Arlington, Texas, U.S.
- Died: January 27, 1932 (aged 39); Arlington, Texas, U.S.
- Batted: Right Threw: Right

MLB debut
- April 16, 1915, for the Brooklyn Robins

Last MLB appearance
- October 5, 1916, for the Brooklyn Robins

MLB statistics
- Win–loss record: 5–12
- Earned run average: 3.25
- Strikeouts: 64
- Stats at Baseball Reference

Teams
- Brooklyn Robins (1915–1916)

Edward Samuel Appleton (February 29, 1892 – January 27, 1932) was born in Arlington. He was an American pitcher in Major League Baseball who played for the Brooklyn Robins in the 1915 and 1916 seasons. Appleton was the victim of a trick by St. Louis Cardinals manager Miller Huggins during a 1915 game. Tied in the 7th inning, and with two outs for the Cardinals and a runner on third base, Huggins called out to Appleton 'Let me see that ball'. Appleton tossed the ball to Huggins, who stepped aside. The ball flew past him and the Cardinal runner scored. The Robins protested, but the umpire told them that because time had not been called, the ball was still in play and Appleton was throwing it at his own risk.
