= Paris Boosters =

American baseball team

The Paris Boosters was a Class-D South Central League (1912) and Texas–Oklahoma League (1913) baseball team based in Paris, Texas, USA. George Harper and Dickey Kerr played for the team in 1913. Harper finished second on the team in hits while Kerr finished second on the team in wins.

The Boosters finished fourth in the South Central League in 1912 (out of six teams) and second in the Texas–Oklahoma League in 1913. They posted a .640 winning percentage in the latter season.
