= Sherman, Texas minor league baseball teams =

Minor league baseball teams based in Sherman, Texas, United States

Sherman
- 1895–1952; (1895–96, 1912–17, 1921–23, 1929, 1946, 1952); Sherman, Texas

Minor league affiliations
- Previous classes: Class B (1895); Class C (1896, 1946); Class D (1912–17, 1921–23, 1929, 1952)
- Previous leagues: Sooner State League (1952); East Texas League (1946); Lone Star League (1929); Texas Association (1923); Texas–Oklahoma League (1921–1922, 1912–1914); Western Association (1915–1917); Texas-Southern League (1895–1896)

Minor league titles
- League titles: Texas Association co-champions (1923)

Team data
- Previous names: Sherman Twins (1923, 1946, 1952); Sherman Snappers (1929); Sherman Red Sox (1922); Sherman Browns (1917); Sherman Lions (1913–1914, 1916, 1921); Sherman Hitters (1915); Sherman Cubs (1912); Sherman Students (1896); Sherman Orphans (1895)

Several different minor league baseball teams were based in Sherman, Texas, intermittently for a total of 14 seasons between 1895 and 1952. These teams won one championship, shared; that of the Texas Association in 1923.

The 14 seasons saw nine different team names used, with only two names used for more than a single season; the Lions (four seasons) and the Twins (three seasons). The 14 seasons were contested in seven different leagues. Baseball Hall of Fame outfielder Ross Youngs played for Sherman in 1916.

== Teams ==
Klondike Douglass, one of Sherman's managers in 1895

Box score of Sherman's first game, a 24–20 loss to Fort Worth on April 29, 1895, as published in the Fort Worth Daily Gazette

=== Sherman Orphans ===
The Orphans played only during 1895, as a member of the Class B Texas-Southern League, finishing in fourth place within the eight-team league, with a record of 53–64.

=== Sherman Students ===
The Students only played part of the 1896 season, as a member of the Class C Texas-Southern League, compiling a record of 25–27 before disbanding in June. Their spot in the league, and record, were taken over by a team located in Paris, Texas. The league renamed itself as the Texas Association in July, and four of its eight teams (including Paris) folded in early August.

=== Sherman Cubs ===
The Cubs played only during 1912, as a member of the Class D Texas–Oklahoma League, finishing in third place within the eight-team league, with a record of 56–37; the team was managed by Jimmie Humphries.

=== Sherman Hitters ===
The Hitters played only during 1915, as a member of the Class D Western Association, finishing in third place within the eight-team league, with a record of 70–65; the team was managed by A. L. "Dad" Ritter.

=== Sherman Lions ===
The Lions played during four seasons: 1913, 1914, 1916, and 1921. They competed in the Class D Texas–Oklahoma League in 1913, 1914, and 1921. They were members of the Class D Western Association in 1916.

The 1913 team finished fourth of eight teams, with a record of 68–58, managed by Jimmie Humphries. Ed Appleton of Sherman pitched a no hitter on July 6 against the Denison Blue Sox. Pitcher Ben Tincup led the league with 233 strikeouts. The 1914 team disbanded at the end of July, with a record of 30–75; the team had been led by three different managers. The 1916 team finished seventh of eight teams, with a record of 61–76, led by two different managers. The 1921 team finished last in a six-team league, with a record of 48–78, led by two different managers. Pitcher Sam Gray led the league with 237 strikeouts.

In addition to Appleton, Gray, and Tincup, Lions players who appeared in the major leagues include Howard Murphy, Farmer Ray, and Hall of Fame inductee Ross Youngs.

=== Sherman Browns ===
The Browns played only during 1917, as a member of the Class D Western Association, finishing in third place within the eight-team league, with a record of 79–73; the team was managed by Leo Hellman. Notable players for the Browns include pitcher Charlie Robertson, who in 1922 would pitch the fifth perfect game in major league history.

=== Sherman Red Sox ===
The Red Sox played only during 1922, as a member of the Class D Texas–Oklahoma League, finishing in fifth place within the eight-team league, with a record of 48–60; the team was managed by Grady Higginbotham.

=== Sherman Snappers ===
The Snappers played only during 1929, as a member of the Class D Lone Star League, finishing in third place within the four-team league, with a record of 9–9; the team was managed by Red Snapp. The league disbanded in mid-May when the Texarkana Twins folded.

=== Sherman Twins ===
Final standings for the first half of the 1923 split season, as published on June 28, 1923, in the Austin American-Statesman

The Twins played during 1923, 1946, and 1952 in the Class D Texas Association, Class C East Texas League, and Class D Sooner State League, respectively.

The 1923 team won the first half of a split season, with the Austin Rangers winning the second half; the Twins had an overall record of 72–67 for the entire season, third-best in the six-team league. The Twins and Rangers tied a six-game playoff series, three games each. The Twins had two different managers, one being player-manager Otto McIvor, who had played in the major leagues in 1911. Longtime minor league outfielder Tom Pyle of the Twins led the league in batting average (.359), runs (94), and hits (199). Pitcher Murray Richburg led the league in strikeouts with 197.

The 1946 team finished fifth in an eight-team league, with a 70–70 record under manager Guy Sturdy, a native of Sherman. The squad had several players who appeared in the major leagues: Larry Drake, Buck Frierson, Pat McLaughlin, Monty Stratton, and John Whitehead. Stratton, who had pitched for the Chicago White Sox during 1934–1938, was notable for having an artificial leg, the result of a hunting accident following the 1938 season.

The 1952 team finished fifth in an eight-team league with a record of 72–68. A 6–1 loss to the Shawnee Hawks on the final day of the regular season resulted in Sherman missing the league's four-team postseason by a single game. The Twins were led by player-manager Bennie Warren, who had played six seasons in the major leagues as a catcher.

Note that another team, also known as the Twins, based jointly in Sherman and nearby Denison, competed from 1947 to 1951 and again in 1953.

== Results by season ==
Season	Team name	Record	Win pct.	Finish	League name	Class	Manager(s)
1895	Orphans	53–64	.453	4th of 8	Texas-Southern League	B	N. M. Legg, Frank Ryan, Mike O'Connor, Klondike Douglass
1896	Students	25–27	.481	n/a	Texas-Southern League	C	Frank Ryan
1912	Cubs	56–37	.602	3rd of 8	Texas–Oklahoma League	D	Jimmie Humphries
1913	Lions	68–58	.540	4th of 8	Texas–Oklahoma League	D	Jimmie Humphries
1914	Lions	30–75	.286	n/a	Texas–Oklahoma League	D	Dolly Gray, Charley Moran, Harry Webber
1915	Hitters	70–65	.519	3rd of 8	Western Association	D	A. L. "Dad" Ritter
1916	Lions	61–76	.445	7th of 8	Western Association	D	Walter Frantz, Jack Love
1917	Browns	79–73	.520	3rd of 8	Western Association	D	Leo Hellman
1921	Lions	48–78	.381	6th of 6	Texas–Oklahoma League	D	Babe Peebles, James "Curley" Maloney
1922	Red Sox	48–60	.444	5th of 8	Texas–Oklahoma League	D	Grady Higginbotham
1923	Twins	72–67	.518	3rd of 6	Texas Association	D	A. B. Sands, Otto McIvor
1929	Snappers	9–9	.500	n/a	Lone Star League	D	Red Snapp
1946	Twins	70–70	.500	5th of 8	East Texas League	C	Guy Sturdy
1952	Twins	72–68	.514	5th of 8	Sooner State League	D	Bennie Warren
TOTAL	14 seasons	761–827	.479				

Notes:

- In 1896, the team disbanded on June 10.
- In 1914, the team disbanded on July 30.
- In 1923, the team won the first-half of a split season, and were league co-champions.
- In 1929, the league disbanded on May 16.
