= Durant Educators =

The Durant Educators were a Texas–Oklahoma League baseball team based in Durant, Oklahoma, USA that played during the 1911 season. They were managed by Ben Brownlow, W. W. Washington, Hetty Green and Joe Connor in their only year of existence. The Educators placed 2nd in the league with a 65-46 overall record, hosting home games at the Durant Base Ball Park.
