= Fred Nicholson =

American baseball player (1894–1972)

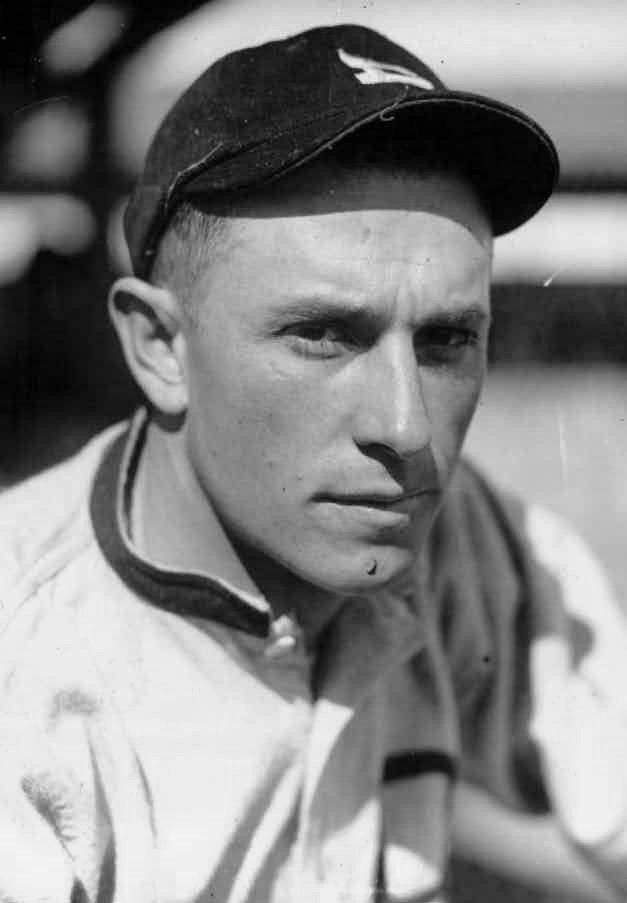
- Outfielder
- Born: September 1, 1894; Honey Grove, Texas, U.S.
- Died: January 23, 1972 (aged 77); Kilgore, Texas, U.S.
- Batted: Right Threw: Right

MLB debut
- April 11, 1917, for the Detroit Tigers

Last MLB appearance
- September 16, 1922, for the Boston Braves

MLB statistics
- Batting average: .311
- Home runs: 12
- Runs batted in: 108
- Stats at Baseball Reference

Teams
- Detroit Tigers (1917); Pittsburgh Pirates (1919–1920); Boston Braves (1921–1922)

Fred Nicholson (September 1, 1894 – January 23, 1972) was an American Major League Baseball player who played outfield from 1912-1922. He would play for the Pittsburgh Pirates, Boston Braves, and Detroit Tigers.
