= Paris Snappers =

The Paris Snappers were a minor league baseball team that played in the Texas–Oklahoma League (1914, 1921–1922) and Lone Star League (1927). In 1921, 1922 and 1927, the squad was managed by Red Snapp, after whom the team was nicknamed. The squad won the league championship in 1921. Notable players include Sam Gray, George Harper, Dickey Kerr and Wilcy Moore.

The team was based in Paris, Texas, United States.
