= Wichita Falls Spudders =

- 1911–1957; (1911–1913, 1920–1932, 1941–1942, 1947–1954, 1956–1957); Wichita Falls, Texas

Minor league affiliations
- Class: Class B (1956–1957); Class C (1954); Class B (1947–1953); Class D (1941–1942); Class A (1921–1932); Class B (1920); Class D (1911–1913)
- League: Big State League (1956–1957); Longhorn League (1954); Big State League (1947–1953); West Texas–New Mexico League (1941–1942); Texas League (1920–1932); Texas–Oklahoma League (1911–1913)

Major league affiliations
- Team: Brooklyn Dodgers (1956); Washington Senators (1954); Boston/Milwaukee Braves (1952–1953); St. Louis Browns (1948–1951); Cincinnati Reds (1941); St. Louis Browns (1929–1932); Chicago Cubs (1922–1925); Pittsburgh Pirates (1920-1921)

Minor league titles
- Dixie Series titles (1): 1927
- League titles (2): 1927; 1953
- First-half titles (1): 1930
- Second-half titles (2): 1928; 1929

Team data
- Name: Wichita Falls Spudders (1920–1932, 1941–1942, 1947–1954, 1956–1957); Wichita Falls Drillers (1912–1913); Wichita Falls Irish Lads (1911)
- Ballpark: Athletic Park

The Wichita Falls Spudders were a minor league baseball team that formed in 1920 and played its last game in 1957. They were based in Wichita Falls, Texas.

The first Spudders team ran from 1920–1932 and played in the Texas League as an affiliate of the Pittsburgh Pirates, Chicago Cubs and St. Louis Browns. In 1927, they won the league championship and the Dixie Series, a postseason interleague championship between the winners of the Southern Association and the Texas League. That team moved to Longview, Texas in 1932 and became the Longview Cannibals. They moved to the Dixie League in 1933 and then the West Dixie League from 1934–1935 and the East Texas League from 1936–1939. They were affiliated with the Chicago White Sox from 1934–1939. The team disbanded after the 1939 season.

A second team, also called the Spudders operated from 1941–1942 in the West Texas–New Mexico League as an affiliate of the Cincinnati Reds.

The Third Spudders team operated from 1947–1954 as part of the Big State League (1937–1953) and Longhorn League (1954). This team was affiliated with the St. Louis Browns (1948–1951), Boston Braves/Milwaukee Braves (1952–1953) and Washington Senators (1954). They moved away and became the Sweetwater Spudders for the 1955 season.

The final Spudders team operated from 1956–1957 in the Big State League as an affiliate of the Brooklyn Dodgers. They disbanded halfway through the 1957 season.
