= Marlin Marlins =

- 1916–1925; (1916–1917, 1923–1925); Marlin, Texas

Minor league affiliations
- Class: Class D (1916–1917, 1923–1925)
- League: Central Texas League (1916–1917); Texas Association (1923–1925)

Major league affiliations
- Team: None

Minor league titles
- League titles (0): None

Team data
- Name: Marlin Marlins (1916–1917); Marlin Bathers (1923–1925)
- Ballpark: Marlin City Park (1916–1917, 1923–1925)

The Marlin Marlins were a minor league baseball team based in Marlin, Texas. The "Marlins" played in 1916 and 1917 as members of the Class D level Central Texas League, The Marlins were succeeded by the Marlin Bathers who played as members of the Class D level Texas Association from 1923 to 1925. Marlin hosted home minor league games at Marlin City Park.

Four Major league baseball teams, most notably the New York Giants trained in Marlin, Texas for spring training from 1904 to 1918, overlapping with the beginning of minor league baseball in Marlin.

== History ==
=== 1916 and 1917 - Central Texas League ===
The Marlin Marlins were formed in 1916, playing as members of the Class D level Central Texas League, which formed as a six–team minor league. The six members of the 1916 Central Texas League were Marlin and the Ennis Tigers, Mexia Gassers, Temple Governors, Terrell Terrors and Waxahachie Buffaloes.

In their first season of league play, the 1916 Marlin Marlins finished last in the league standings. Marlin was in sixth place when the Central Texas League folded on July 16, 1916, before the conclusion of the season. With a 25–36 record, the Marlins placed sixth in the Central Texas League standings, playing the season under managers Bob Tarleton, Bob Countryman and Fielder Murra. The Marlin Marlins finished 11.0 games behind the first place Temple Governors in the shortened season.

The Marlin Marlins played their final Central Texas League season in the 1917, as the league permanently folded during the season. The Central Texas League began the season as a four–team league. The Marlins finished in third place overall after the Central Texas League began their third season of play on May 21, 1917, and disbanded on June 6, 1916. The other final league members joining Marlin in 1917 were the Ennis Tigers (8–7), Mexia Gassers (8–6) and Temple Governors/Corsicana Athletics (6–8). With a 7–8 record when the league folded, the Marlins finished 1.5 games behind the first place Mexia Gassers. The 1917 Marlins played under managers H. Sinclair and Ray Wakefield.

=== 1923 to 1925 - Texas Association ===
Minor league baseball returned in 1923, as the Marlin Bathers became charter members of the Class D level Texas Association. The "Bathers" moniker corresponds to the natural springs of the era that produced the hot, mineral water that brought tourists to Marlin, Texas in the era. The six–team league began play in 1923 with the Austin Rangers, Corsicana Oilers, Mexia Gushers, Sherman-Denison Twins, and Waco Indians teams joining Marlin as charter members. The Bathers finished with a record of 63–7, placing fifth in the Texas Association regular season standings. Playing under manager Walt Alexander, Marlin finished 14.0 games behind the first place Mexia Gushers in the final standings.

Marlin continued play in the six–team 1924 Texas Association and ended the season as the league runner up. The Marlin Bathers placed second overall. With a 73–55 record under returning manager Walt Alexander, Marlin finished 11.5 games behind the first place Corsicana Oilers. The league held no playoffs Pitcher Charles Gressett of Marlin led the league with 22 wins.

In their final season of minor league play, the 1925 Marlin Bathers franchise relocated during the Texas Association season. On May 13, 1924, with a 7–15 record, the Marlin Bathers moved to Palestine, Texas and finished the season playing as the Palestine Pals, placing fifth overall. The Marlin/Palestine team finished with a 58–75 overall record, playing the season under managers Fred Pipkin and Tommy McMillan.

Marlin, Texas has not hosted another minor league team.

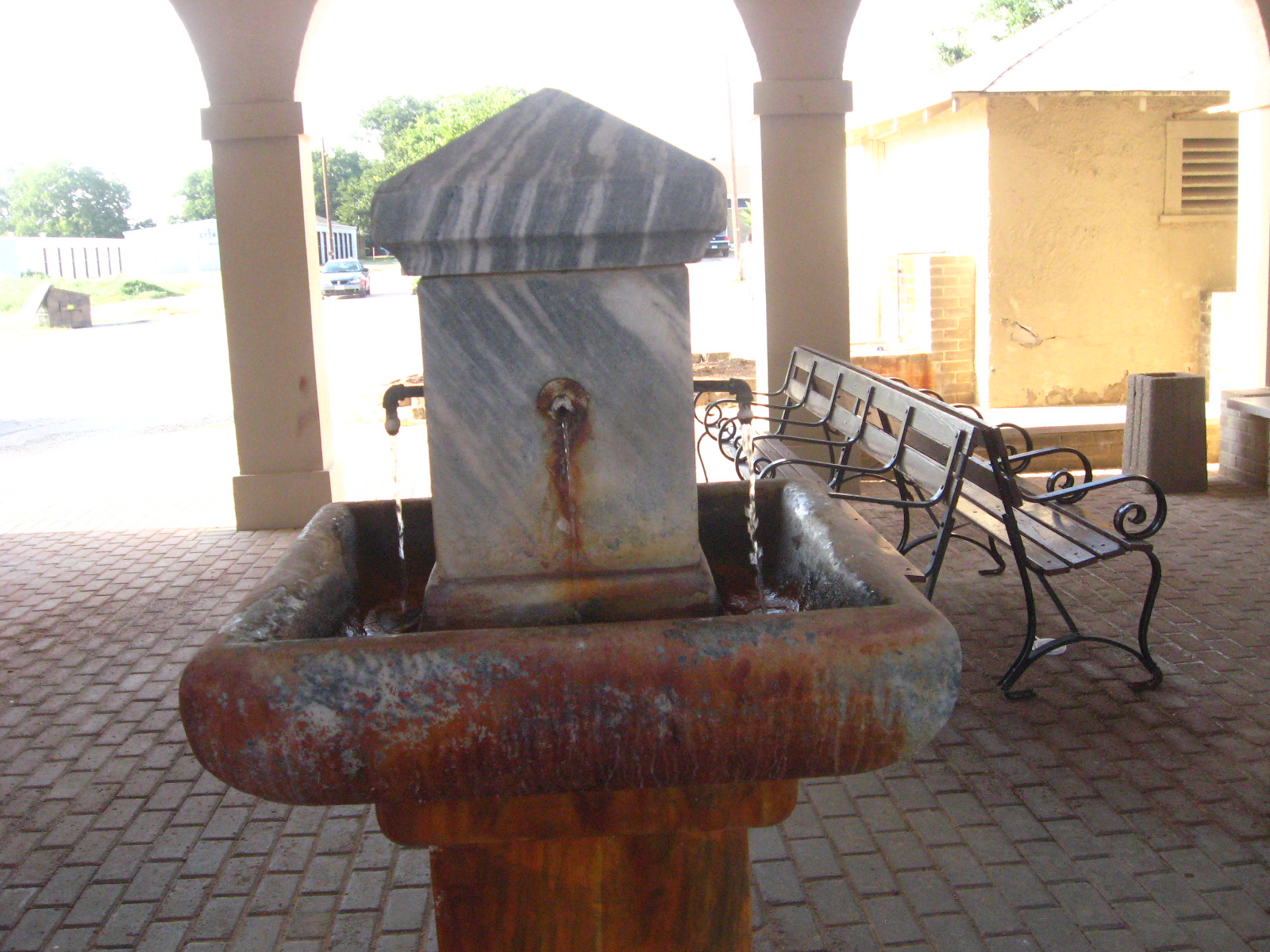
(2010) Mineral Water Fountain. Marlin, Texas

== The ballpark / Spring training ballparks ==
The Marlin teams were noted to have hosted home games at Marlin City Park. The ballpark was located on Muni Park Road off Williams Street, Marlin, Texas. City Park is still in use today as a public park with a ballpark. The park is noted to have entrances off of Williams Street and Bridge Street in Marlin, Texas.

Marlin, Texas also hosted spring training for major league baseball teams. The Chicago White Sox (1904), St. Louis Cardinals (1905), Cincinnati Reds (1906–1907) and New York Giants (1908–1918) all utilized the ballparks in Marlin, Texas for spring training. Teams were attracted to the mineral water baths in Marlin. It is unknown if the minor league teams utilized any of the facilities used by the major league teams, but given the small population of the town at the time (4,000), it is likely.

The White Sox, Cardinals and Reds are noted to have trained at a site near the fairgrounds in Marlin. This ballpark was called "Fairgrounds Field" or "East Side Field." It is possible this was the site of "Marlin City Park, " as Marlin City Park still hosts the Falls County Youth fairs at the site.

The Giants use of Emerson Park in Marlin is noted as being the first "permanent" spring training facility built by a major league team. The Giants' facility had a side field called Rimes Park and other practice areas. While the Giants use of Emerson Park directly overlaps the play of the Marlin Marlins, it is unknown if the minor league team played at the facility or if the Marlin Bathers used it after the Giants left. The ballpark was deeded to the New York Giants from the city and remained the property of the New York Giants and San Francisco Giants until the 1970s. Emerson Park was named after a local postmaster who was instrumental in developing the facility. The Giants would walk the one mile from the team hotel, The Arlington Hotel, to the ballpark twice a day everyday, walking along the railroad tracks. Every year, Marlin hosted a fish fry for the team before the Giants left to begin the regular season.

== Timeline ==
Year(s)	# Yrs.	Team	Level	League	Ballpark
1916–1917	2	Marlin Marlins	Class D	Central Texas League	Marlin City Park
1923–1925	3	Marlin Bathers	Class D	Texas Association	Marlin City Park

== Year–by–year records ==
Year	Record	Finish	Manager	Playoffs/Notes
1916	25–36	6th	Bob Tarleton / Bob Countryman / Fielder Murray	League folded July 16
1917	7–9	3rd	H. Sinclair / Roy Wakefield	League folded June 6
1923	63–73	5th	Walt Alexander	None held
1924	73–55	2nd	Walt Alexander	None held
1925	58–75	5th	Fred Pipkin / Tommy McMillan	Marlin (7–15) moved to Palestine May 13

== Notable alumni ==
- Walt Alexander (1923–1924, MGR)
- Gene Bailey (1916)
- Boom-Boom Beck (1925)
- Buster Chatham (1923)
- Joe Munson (1924)
- Marlin Bathers players
