= Waco Indians (baseball) =

- 1923–1924; Waco, Texas

Minor league affiliations
- Class: Class D (1923–1924)
- League: Texas Association (1923–1924)

Major league affiliations
- Team: None

Minor league titles
- League titles (0): None
- Wild card berths (0): None

Team data
- Name: Waco Indians (1923–1924)
- Ballpark: Katy Park (1923–1924)

The Waco Indians were a minor league baseball team based in Waco, Texas.

The "Indians" played in the 1923 and 1924 seasons as members of the Class D level Texas Association.

The Waco Indians teams hosted home minor league games at Katy Park. The ballpark site is known today as "Katy Ballpark at the Silos."

== History ==
Minor league baseball began in Waco, Texas in 1899, when the Waco "Babies" played the season as members of the Texas League, beginning a tenure of Waco teams in the league. The Waco Indians were immediately preceded in minor league play by the 1919 Waco Navigators, who ended the tenure of Waco Texas League teams.

After a three-season hiatus, minor league baseball returned to Waco in 1923, as the Waco Indians became charter members of the six-team Class D level Texas Association. The Austin Rangers, Corsicana Oilers, Marlin Bathers, Mexia Gushers and Sherman-Denison Twins teams joined with Waco as charter members in beginning league play.

In their first season of Texas Association league play, the Indians finished in last place. Waco ended the season a record of 59–80, placing sixth in the Texas Association standings. Playing under managers Ray Falk, H. House, Bill Reynolds and Warwick Comstock, Waco finished 20.5 games behind the first place Mexia Gushers in the final standings. Don Flinn, who played for both Waco and Austin, led the Texas Association with 22 home runs.

Waco continued play in the six–team 1924 Texas Association and ended the season in third place in the league. The Waco Indians completed the season with a 65–64 record, playing under managers Otto McIvor and Tom Carson. Waco finished 18.0 games behind the first place Corsicana Oilers in the final standings as the league held no playoffs. After departing Waco during the season, Otto McIvor became manager of the Austin Rangers.

Joining another league, Waco did not return to the Texas Association and were replaced by the Terrell Terrors franchise in the six-team league.

Waco, Texas continued minor league play in 1925 in a new league, as the Waco Cubs began another tenure of Waco teams in rejoining the Class A level Texas League. The Class A level was the highest level of minor leagues in the era

== The ballpark ==
The Waco Indians teams hosted home games at Katy Park. The ballpark began hosting minor league teams in 1905 with the Waco Tigers and continued as a minor league ballpark through 1956, with the Waco Pirates of the Big State League as the final team. The ballpark was located adjacent to Cotton Place Fairgrounds. It was of the Baylor Stadium in the era and was located at Jackson Avenue & South 7th Street at Webster Avenue & South 8th Street in Waco, Texas.

When Katy Park opened for baseball on April 6, 1905, President Teddy Roosevelt was on hand and gave a speech at the ballpark.

In 1929, Babe Ruth and the New York Yankees played an exhibition game at the ballpark against the Waco Cubs.

On May 5, 1930, the first night baseball game in Texas took place at Katy Park in a contest between the Negro leagues' Kansas City Monarchs and the local Waco Black Cardinals, utilizing the Monarchs' portable light system. The Monarchs won the game by the score 8–0.

The original ballpark was razed in the 1960s and became a parking lot. In 2020, the former ballpark site became a part of the "Magnolia Market at the Silos" and was returned to a ballpark. The new ballpark at the site is called "Katy Ballpark at the Silos."

== Timeline ==
Year(s)	# Yrs.	Team	Level	League	Ballpark
1923–1924	3	Waco Indians	Class D	Texas Association	Katy Park

== Year–by–year records ==
Year	Record	Finish	Manager(s)	Playoffs/Notes
1923	59–80	6th	Ray Falk / H. House; Bill Reynolds / Warwick Comstock	No playoffs held
1924	65–64	3rd	Otto McIvor / Tom Carson	No playoffs held

== Notable alumni ==
- Dusty Boggess (1924)
- Don Flinn (1923)
- Fred Johnson (1923)
- Otto McIvor (1924, MGR)
- Russell Pence (1923)
- Bill Reynolds (1923, MGR)

== See also ==
- Waco Indians players
