= Texas Association =

American sports league in minor league baseball

- Sport: Baseball
- Founded: 1923
- Folded: 1926
- No. of teams: 6
- Country: United States
- Last champion: Palestine Pals (1926)
- Most titles: Corsicana Oilers (2); Palestine Pals (1); Austin Rangers (1/2); Sherman Twins (1/2)

The Texas Association was a sports league of minor league baseball teams in Texas that operated from 1923 through 1926. An earlier league, initially known as the Texas-Southern League, used the same name from mid-1896 through 1899. History of the Texas Association during the 1920s follows.

== History ==
The league's inaugural schedule, as published in The Austin American on March 25, 1923

The league operated in 1923 with a six-team format. The Austin Rangers, Corsicana Oilers, Marlin Bathers, Mexia Gushers, Sherman Twins, and Waco Indians made up the league that year. While Mexia had the best win–loss record for the entire season, the league played a split season, with Sherman winning the first half, and Austin winning the second half. Sherman and Austin played a six-game playoff series, which ended in a tie at three games each.

The Sherman squad did not return for 1924 and was replaced by the Temple Surgeons; all other teams returned. Corsicana finished in first place during both halves of the split season, thus no playoffs were held.

For 1925, the Austin Rangers became the Austin Senators, while the Waco club did not return and was replaced by the Terrell Terrors; all other teams returned. On May 13, Marlin moved to Palestine to become the Palestine Pals. Corsicana again won both halves of a split season. Minor league legend Smead Jolley played for Corsicana that year, while 12-year major league veteran Boom-Boom Beck suited up for the Marlin/Palestine club.

1926 was the final year of the Texas Association, with all six teams returning from the previous year. Austin won the first half of the split season and Palestine won the second half. These two teams played a postseason series, won by Palestine, three games to none.

No effort was made to bring the league back for 1927. Teams of three cities moved to the newly formed Lone Star League (Palestine, Mexia and Corsicana) while three others ceased operations (Austin, Terrell, and Temple). Teams based in Austin and Temple later played in the Big State League of the late 1940s and early 1950s, while Terrell has yet to field another team.

== Cities represented 1923-1926 ==
- Austin, TX: Austin Rangers 1923–1924; Austin Senators 1925–1926
- Corsicana, TX: Corsicana Oilers 1923–1926
- Marlin, TX: Marlin Bathers 1923–1925
- Mexia, TX: Mexia Gushers 1923–1926
- Palestine, TX: Palestine Pals 1925–1926
- Sherman, TX & Denison, TX: Sherman-Denison Twins 1923
- Temple, TX: Temple Surgeons 1924–1926
- Terrell, TX: Terrell Terrors 1925–1926
- Waco, TX: Waco Indians 1923–1924

== Standings & statistics ==
=== 1923 Texas Association ===
schedule

Team standings	W	L	PCT	GB	Managers
Mexia Gushers	80	60	.571	--	Hub Northen
Austin Rangers	72	66	.522	7.	Rankin Johnson
Sherman-Denison Twins	72	67	.518	7½	A. B. Sands / Otto McIvor
Corsicana Oilers	68	70	.493	11	Harvey Grubb
Marlin Bathers	65	73	.471	14	Walt Alexander
Waco Indians	59	80	.424	20½	Ray Falk / H. House / Bill Reynolds / Warwick Comstock

Playoff: Austin 3 games, Sherman 3. The series was declared a tie when the two clubs could not agree upon a site for the deciding game.

Player statistics
Player	Team	Stat	Tot	Player	Team	Stat	Tot
Tom Pyle	Sherman	BA	.359	Clarence Tiner	Mexia	W	23
Tom Pyle	Sherman	Runs	94	Murray Richburg	Sherman	SO	197
Tom Pyle	Sherman	Hits	199	Harvey Muns	Sherman	PCT	.690; 20–9
Don Flynn	Waco/Austin	HR	22				

=== 1924 Texas Association ===
schedule

Team standings	W	L	PCT	GB	Managers
Corsicana Oilers	83	42	.664	--	John Vann
Marlin Bathers	73	55	.570	11½	Walt Alexander
Waco Indians	65	64	.504	20	Otto McIvor / Tom Carson
Mexia Gushers	60	68	.469	24½	Tuffy Fowlkes
Austin Rangers	54	72	.429	29½	Cecil Griggs / Fats Fleharty / Otto McIvor
Temple Surgeons	48	82	.369	37½	Rankin Johnson Sr.

Playoff: None

Player statistics
Player	Team	Stat	Tot	Player	Team	Stat	Tot
Joe Munson	Carlson	BA	.346	Charles Gressett	Marlin	W	22
Bill Etheredge	Corsicana	Runs	106	Tex Nugent	Temple	SO	176
Bill Etheredge	Corsicana	Hits	159	William Hollis	Corsicana	PCT	.789; 15–4
Stephen Barrett	Corsicana	HR	27				

=== 1925 Texas Association ===
schedule 1st half
schedule 2nd half

Team standings	W	L	PCT	GB	Managers
Corsicana Oilers	85	48	.639	--	John Vann
Mexia Gushers	76	57	.571	9	Frank Matthews
Temple Surgeons	74	59	.556	11	Roy Mitchell
Austin Senators	63	70	.474	22	Bennie Brownlow
Marlin Bathers / Palestine Pals	58	75	.436	27	Fred Pipkin / Tommy McMillan
Terrell Terrors	43	90	.323	42	Otto McIvor / Ed Fulton / Pete Adams

Marlin moved to Palestine May 13.

Player statistics
Player	Team	Stat	Tot	Player	Team	Stat	Tot
Clyde Glass	Mexia	BA	.367	Joe Cantrell	Corsicana	W	22
Cotton Tucker	Temple	Runs	129	Dick Whitworth	Austin	SO	152
Smead Jolley	Corsicana	Hits	180	Bob Arnold	Mexia	PCT	.706; 12–5
Clyde Glass	Mexia	Hits	180				
Stan Keyes	Terrell	HR	28				

=== 1926 Texas Association ===
Team standings	W	L	PCT	GB	Managers
Austin Senators	73	49	.598	--	Charles Miller
Palestine Pals	72	53	.576	2½	Jack Stansbury / Bob Countryman
Mexia Gushers	63	62	.504	11½	Frank Matthews
Terrell Terrors	56	68	.452	18	Jimmy Maloney
Temple Surgeons	56	69	.448	18½	Roy Mitchell
Corsicana Oilers	53	72	.424	21½	John Vann

Playoff: Palestine 3 games, Austin 0.

Player statistics
Player	Team	Stat	Tot	Player	Team	Stat	Tot
Clyde Glass	Mexia	BA	.361	Dick Whitworth	Austin	W	24
Jimmie Long	Mexia	Runs	99	Dick Whitworth	Austin	SO	176
Jimmie Long	Mexia	Hits	164	Les Cox	Palestine	SO	176
Norman Peterson	Austin	HR	29	Carl Littlejohn	Austin	PCT	.824; 14–3
