= Brenham, Texas minor league history =

Brenham, Texas minor league teams
- 1905–1915; (1905, 1914–1915); Brenham, Texas

Minor league affiliations
- Class: Class C (1905); Class D (1914–1915)
- League: South Texas League (1905); Middle Texas League (1914–1915)

Major league affiliations
- Team: None

Minor league titles
- League titles (0): None

Team data
- Name: Brenham Cotton Pickers (1905); Brenham Brewers (1914–1915); Brenham Kaisers (1915)
- Ballpark: League Park (1914)

Minor league baseball teams were based in Brenham, Texas in three seasons between 1905 and 1915. The Brenham teams played as members of the South Texas League in 1905 and Middle Texas League in 1914 and 1915.

== History ==
Minor league baseball began in Brenham, Texas in 1905. The Brenham Cotton Pickers played briefly as members of the Class C level South Texas League. The Beaumont Oilers, with a 40–68 record, moved to Brenham on August 21, 1905. The team had a 1–6 record playing exclusively in Brenham, before becoming a road team. The Beaumont/Branham team completed the 1905 the season schedule playing their final home games in numerous locations including Austin, Texas and San Antonio, Texas and being called the "Orphans." The Beaumont/Brenham team finished with an overall record of 45–81, placing eighth and last in the South Texas League. The team was managed by Harry Longley and Brooks Gordon.

Minor league baseball returned in 1914 as the Brenham Brewers became charter members of the Class D level Middle Texas League. The Middle Texas League began play as a six–team league, with the franchises based in Bartlett, Texas (Bartlett Bearcats), Belton, Texas (Belton Braves), Georgetown, Texas (Georgetown Collegians), Lampasas, Texas (Lampasas Resorters) and Temple, Texas (Temple Tigers) joining Brenham in league play.

Art R. Bailey was the owner of the Brenham franchise in 1914 and Will Morriss served as secretary. Bailey owned a local cut glass company advertising as a jeweler and optician.

The Brenham use of the "Brewers" moniker corresponds to local industry in Brenham, with Brenham being been home to the G.F. Giesecke and Brothers Brewery of Brenham during the era.

The Brenham Brewers began play in the Middle Texas League on May 8, 1914, playing under manager Ike Pendleton. The Middle Texas League played a spit–season schedule, with champions during each half. Brenham placed third overall in the league regular season standings, finishing 5.5 games behind the first place Temple Tigers. The final overall standings were led the Temple Tigers (54–27) followed by the Georgetown Collegians (50–30), Brenham Brewers (50–34), Belton Braves (37–47), Lampasas Resorters (35–51) and Bartlett Bearcats (22–59).

In 1915, Brenham hosted two Middle Texas League teams. Both teams folded, along with the Middle Texas League before the completion of the 1915 season. On June 7, 1915, the Brenham Brewers folded. At the time they folded, the Brewers had a 12–31 record under managers Arthur Wicks and John Tuller. However, Brenham gained another team the next day. On May 1, 1915, the Austin Reps, with a 2–5 record, had moved to become the Taylor Producers due to flooding at the ballpark in Austin. On June 8, 1915, the day after the Brewers folded, team then moved from Taylor (15–23) to Brenham to replace the Brewers. Some references have the first 1915 Brenham team playing under the "Huskies" moniker instead of the "Brewers."

Beginning on June 9, 1915, the Brenham Kaisers continued play under managers Jack Snipes and Billy Disch until the Middle Texas League permanently folded on June 19, 1915. The Middle Texas league final standings were led by the Belton Braves (40–19), who finished 8.0 games ahead of the second place Temple Governors (32–27), followed by the Bartlett Bearcats (29–26) and Austin Representatives/Taylor Producers/Brenham Kaisers (21–36). The Schulenburg Giants were 23–18 and the Brenham Brewers 12–31 when they both folded on June 7, 1915. The Belton Braves won both half–seasons of the league and no playoffs were held as the league folded.

Brenham, Texas has not hosted another minor league team.

== The ballpark ==
A local newspaper in July 1914 referred to the Brenham home ballpark as League Park.

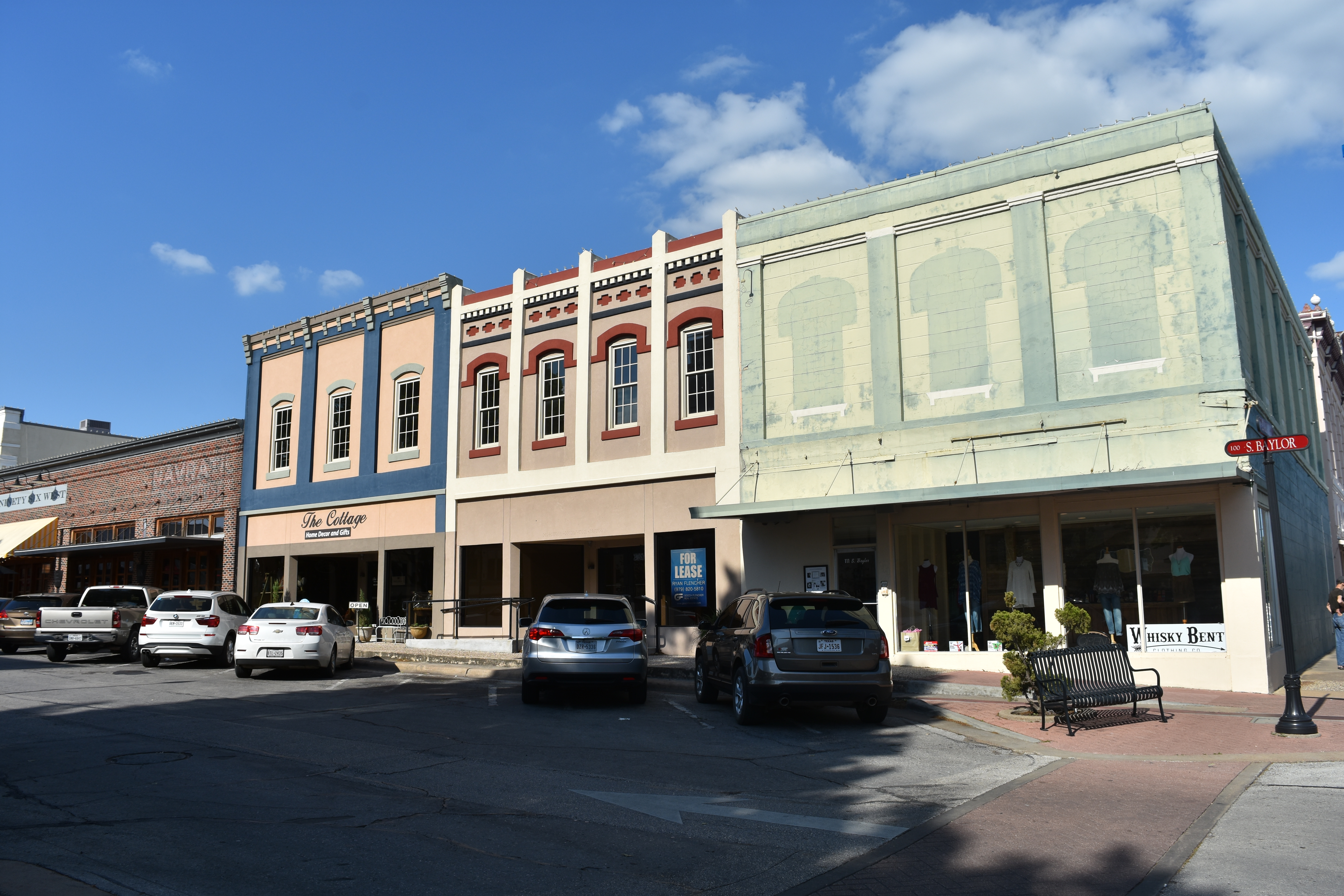
(2017) Downtown Brenham, Texas

== Timeline ==
Year(s)	# Yrs.	Team	Level	League
1905	1	Brenham Cotton Pickers	Class C	South Texas League
1914–1915	2	Brenham Brewers	Class D	Middle Texas League
1915 (2)	1	Brenham Kaisers	Class D	Middle Texas League

== Year–by–year records ==
Year	Record	Finish	Manager	Playoffs/Notes
1905	45–81	8th	Harry Longley / Brooks Gordon	moved from Beaumont August 21
1914	50–34	3rd	Ike Pendelton	No playoffs held
1915 (1)	12–21	NA	Arthur Wicks / John Tuller	Brewers folded June 7
1915 (2)	21–36	4th	Jack Snipes / Billy Disch	Taylor (15–23) moved to Brenham June 8 League folded June 19

== Notable alumni ==
- Billy Disch (1915, MGR)
- Newt Hunter (1905)
- Dutch Jordan (1915)

== See also ==
- Brenham Brewers players
- Brenham Cotton Pickers players
- Brenham Kaisers players
