= Georgetown Collegians =

- 1914; Georgetown, Texas

Minor league affiliations
- Class: Class D (1914)
- League: Middle Texas League (1914)

Major league affiliations
- Team: None

Minor league titles
- League titles (0): None

Team data
- Name: Georgetown Collegians (1914)
- Ballpark: Unknown (1914)

The Georgetown Collegians were a minor league baseball team based in Georgetown, Texas. In 1914, the Collegians played the season as charter members of the Middle Texas League, finishing in second place in their only season of minor league play.

== History ==
Minor league baseball began in Georgetown, Texas in 1914. The Georgetown Collegians became charter members of the six–team Class D level Middle Texas League. The Middle Texas League began play the franchises based in Bartlett, Texas (Bartlett Bearcats), Belton, Texas (Belton Braves), Brenham, Texas (Brenham Brewers), Lampasas, Texas (Lampasas Resorters) and Temple, Texas (Temple Tigers) joining Georgetown in league play.

The "Collegians" moniker corresponds to Georgetown, Texas local history and origin. Georgetown, Texas was founded in 1875 from four existing colleges, including Southwestern University, the oldest university in Texas.

The Georgetown Collegians began play in the Middle Texas League on May 8, 1914. The league played a spit–season schedule. The Georgetown Collegians finished the season in second place. With an overall record of 50–30, Georgetown finished 3.5 games behind first place Temple, playing the season under managers Jimmy Callahan and Elmer Gober. Georgetown did not qualify for the playoffs as the Temple Tigers won the first half standings and the Belton Braves won the second half standings. The final overall standings were led by the Temple Tigers (54–27), followed by the Georgetown Collegians (50–30), Brenham Brewers (50–34), Belton Braves (37–47), Lampasas Resorters (35–51) and Bartlett Bearcats (22–59). In the championship playoff, the Belton Braves defeated Temple.

The Georgetown franchise folded after the 1914 season. The Lampasas Resorters also folded following the season. Lampasas and Georgetown were replaced by the Austin Reps and Schulenburg Giants in the 1915 Middle Texas League.

Georgetown, Texas has not hosted another minor league team.

== The ballpark ==
The name of the Georgetown home ballpark for hosting minor league games in 1914 is not directly referenced. In the era, the campus of Southwestern University, which began baseball play in 1884, would have had available facilities to host the team.

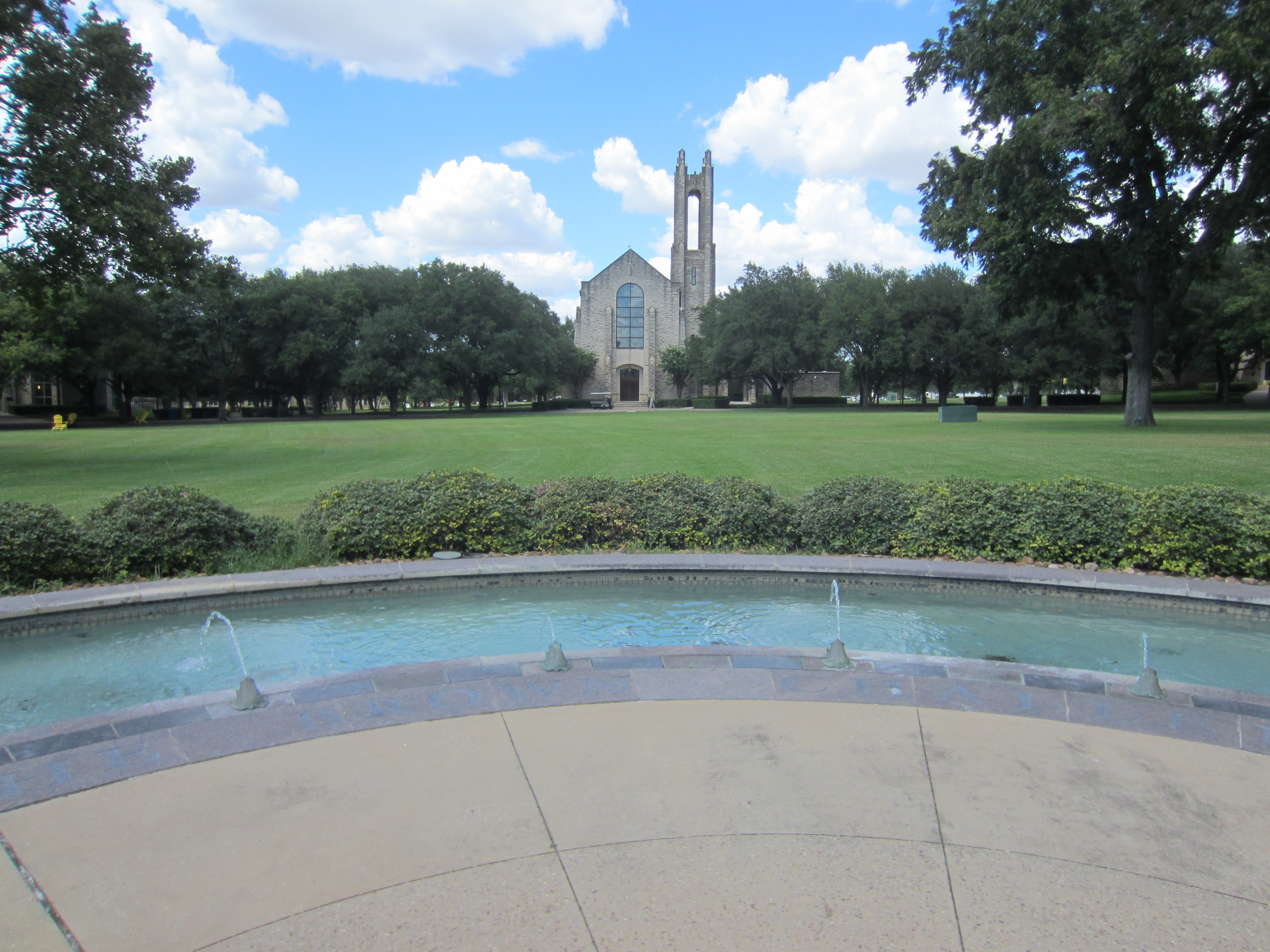
(2018) Georgetown, Texas.

== Year–by–year record ==
Year	Record	Finish	Manager	Playoffs/Notes
1914	50–30	2nd	Jimmy Callahan / Elmer Gober	No playoffs held

== Notable alumni ==
- No Georgetown Collegians alumni appeared in the major leagues.
