= Lampasas Resorters =

- 1914; Lampasas, Texas

Minor league affiliations
- Class: Class D (1914)
- League: Middle Texas League (1914)

Major league affiliations
- Team: None

Minor league titles
- League titles (0): None

Team data
- Name: Lampasas Resorters (1914)
- Ballpark: Unknown (1914)

The Lampasas Resorters were a minor league baseball team based in Lampasas, Texas. In 1914, the Resorters played the season as charter members of the Class D level Middle Texas League, placing fifth in the eight–team league.

== History ==
The 1914 Lampasas Resorters began minor league play when the franchise became charter members of the Class D level Middle Texas League. The Middle Texas League began play as a six–team league, with the six franchises based in Bartlett, Texas (Bartlett Bearcats), Belton, Texas (Belton Braves), Brenham, Texas (Brenham Brewers), Georgetown, Texas (Georgetown Collegians), Lampasas, Texas and Temple, Texas (Temple Tigers).

The "Resorters" moniker derived from local industry. Lampasas, Texas was home to several mineral springs resorts in the era.

On May 8, 1914, the Lampasas Resorters began their first season of play in the Middle Texas League. The league played a spit–season schedule. The Resorters finished the 1914 season in fifth place. With an overall record of 35–51, Lampasas finished 21.5 games behind first place Temple, playing the season under managers Jesse Estill and Luke Roberts. Lampasas did not qualify for the playoffs as the Temple Tigers won the first half standings and the Belton Braves won the second half standings. The final overall standings were led by the Temple Tigers (54–27), followed by the Georgetown Collegians (50–30), Brenham Brewers (50–34), Belton Braves (37–47), Lampasas Resorters (35–51) and Bartlett Bearcats (22–59). In the championship playoff, the Belton Braves defeated Temple.

The Lampasas Resorters permanently folded after the 1914 season. The Lampasas Resorters and Georgetown Collegians were replaced by the Austin Reps and Schulenburg Giants teams in the 1915 Middle Texas League. Lampasas has not hosted another minor league team.

== The ballpark ==
The name and location of the Lampasas home ballpark is not directly referenced. Turner Field Park was in use in the era. Today, Turner Park is still in use as a public park, located at 808 Campbell Street in Lampasas, Texas.

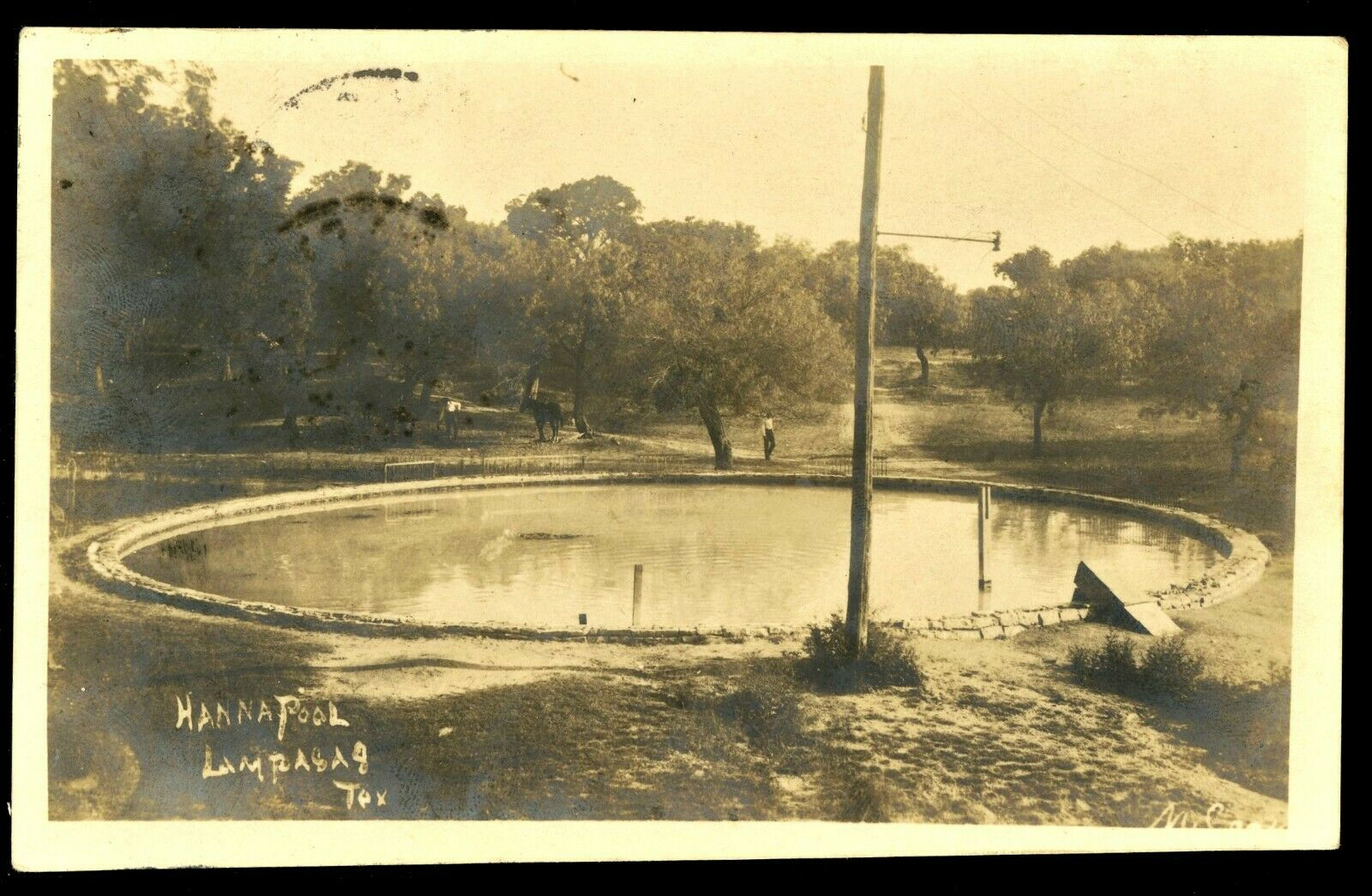
(1907) Hanna Springs Pool. Lampasas, Texas

== Year–by–year record ==
Year	Record	Finish	Manager	Playoffs/Notes
1914	35–51	5th	Jesse Estill / Luke Roberts	No playoffs held

== Notable alumni ==
- No Lampasas Resorters alumni appeared in the major leagues.
