= Austin Braves =

- 1965–1967; Austin, Texas

Minor league affiliations
- Previous classes: Double-A
- League: Texas League (1965–1967)

Major league affiliations
- Previous teams: Unaffiliated

Minor league titles
- League titles (1): 1966

Team data
- Previous names: Austin Pioneers (1947–1955); Austin Senators (1956–1964)

The Austin Braves were a Minor League Baseball team in the East Division of the Texas League and were affiliated with the Milwaukee/Atlanta Braves. Known as the Austin Senators from 1956 to 1964, they played at Disch Field. In 1965, they became the Austin Braves, finishing in last place with a record of 70–70. In 1966, the Braves finished in fourth place with a record of 67–73. In 1967, the team also finished in fourth place with a record of 69–71. In 1968, the Atlanta Braves moved the Austin Braves to Shreveport, Louisiana, where they played as the Shreveport Braves of the Texas League from 1968 to 1970, leaving the Greater Austin area without a professional baseball team until the Round Rock Express debuted in 2000.

Members of the Austin Braves who went on to play in the majors include Dusty Baker (1967), Bobby Cox (1966), Ralph Garr (1966–1967), Clarence "Cito" Gaston (1966–1967), Mike Lum (1966), Félix Millán (1965–1966), Ron Reed (1966), and George Stone (1967).

== Timeline ==
Year(s)	# Yrs.	Team	Level	League	Affiliate
1888–1890	3	Austin Senators	Class C	Texas League	None
1895	1	Austin Beavers	Independent	Texas-Southern League	None
1896	1	Austin Senators	Independent	Texas-Southern League	None
1897–1899, 1905	4	Austin Senators	Class C	Texas League	None
1906	1	Austin Senators	Class D	South Texas League	None
1907–1908, 1911–1914	6	Austin Senators	Class C	Texas League	None
1915	1	Austin Reps	Class D	Middle Texas League	None
1923–1924	2	Austin Rangers	Class D	Texas Association	None
1925–1926	2	Austin Senators	Class D	Texas Association	None
1947–1955	9	Austin Pioneers	Class B	Big State League	None
1965–1967	3	Austin Braves	Class AA	Texas League	Atlanta Braves
