= Don Flinn =

American baseball player (1892–1959)

- Outfielder
- Born: November 17, 1892; Bluff Dale, Texas, U.S.
- Died: March 9, 1959 (aged 66); Waco, Texas, U.S.
- Batted: Right Threw: Right

MLB debut
- September 2, 1917, for the Pittsburgh Pirates

Last MLB appearance
- September 26, 1917, for the Pittsburgh Pirates

MLB statistics
- Batting average: .297
- Home runs: 0
- Runs batted in: 1
- Stats at Baseball Reference

Teams
- Pittsburgh Pirates (1917)

Don Flinn (November 17, 1892 – March 9, 1959) was an American Major League Baseball player who played for the Pittsburgh Pirates in 1917. He played just 14 games, all as an outfielder. He had a .297 batting average.

In 1923, Flinn played for both the Waco Indians and Austin Rangers teams of the Class D level Texas Association and led the league with 22 home runs.

== Sources ==
- Career statistics from Baseball Reference · Baseball Reference (Minors) · Retrosheet · Baseball Almanac
