= Waxahachie Athletics =

- 1915–1916; (1914-1916); Waxahachie, Texas

Minor league affiliations
- Class: Class D (1914–1916)
- League: Central Texas League (1914–1916)

Major league affiliations
- Team: None

Minor league titles
- League titles (1): 1914

Team data
- Name: Waxahachie Buffaloes (1914); Waxahachie Athletics (1915–1916)
- Ballpark: Jungle Park (1914–1916)

The Waxahachie Athletics were a minor league baseball team based in Waxahachie, Texas. The "Athletics" played in 1915 and 1916. With the Athletics preceded by 1914 Waxahachie Buffaloes, the Waxahachie teams played exclusively as members of the Class D level Central Texas League, winning the 1914 league championship. Waxahachie hosted minor league home games at Jungle Park. The Buffaloes were league Central Texas League champions in 1914.

Baseball Hall of Fame member Ross Youngs played for the 1915 Waxahachie Athletics.

== History ==
The Waxahachie Buffaloes were formed in 1914, playing as charter members of the Class D level Central Texas League, which formed as six–team minor league. The charter members joining Waxahachie in the Central Texas League were the Corsicana Athletics, Ennis Tigers, Hillsboro, Texas, Italy, Texas and West, Texas teams.

In their first season of league play, the 1914 Waxahachie Buffaloes won the Central Texas League championship in a shortened season. After the Buffaloes and other league members began play on May 10, 1914, the league did not complete the season. The Central Texas League was scheduled to play a split schedule, but the second half was shortened. When the league folded on July 25, 1914, Waxahachie had the best overall record of 35–23 playing under managers Luther Burleson and Dee Poindexter. In the overall standings, Waxahachie finished 4.5 games ahead of the second place West team. The Waxahachie Buffaloes won the first half standings with a 26–15 first half record. West won the shortened second half standings. A playoff was held after the league stopped regular season play. In the playoff, the Waxahachie Buffaloes won the championship, defeating West 3 games to 2. The team played home games at Jungle Park.

After winning the championship the previous season, the 1915 Waxahachie Athletics finished last as the Central Texas League reformed as a six-team, Class D level league. After beginning play on May 17, 1915, the Central Texas League again folded before the season ended. Joining the Waxahachie Athletics in the 1915 Central Texas League were the Corsicana A's, Ennis Tigers, Kaufman Kings, Mexia Gassers and Terrell Cubs. The Central Texas League folded on July 24, 1915, with the Athletics having a 27–34 overall record under manager Anson Cole on that date. The Athletics finished 8.0 games behind the first place Ennis Tigers in the six–team standings.

At age 18, Baseball Hall of Fame member Ross Youngs played for the 1915 Athletics, hitting .274 in 106 at bats.

The Waxahachie Athletics played their final season as the 1916 Central Texas League again reformed after folding the previous season. The Athletics finished in 5th place overall after the Central Texas League began their third season of play on April 28, 1916, and disbanded on July 16, 1916. The league members joining Waxahachie in 1916 were the Ennis Tigers, Marlin Marlins, Mexia Gassers, Temple Governors and Terrell Terrors. At 26–35, the Athletics finished 10.0 games behind the first place Temple Governors under manager Dee Poindexter, a Waxahachie native. After the season, the Waxahachie franchise permanently folded and Waxahachie has not hosted another minor league team.

== The ballpark ==
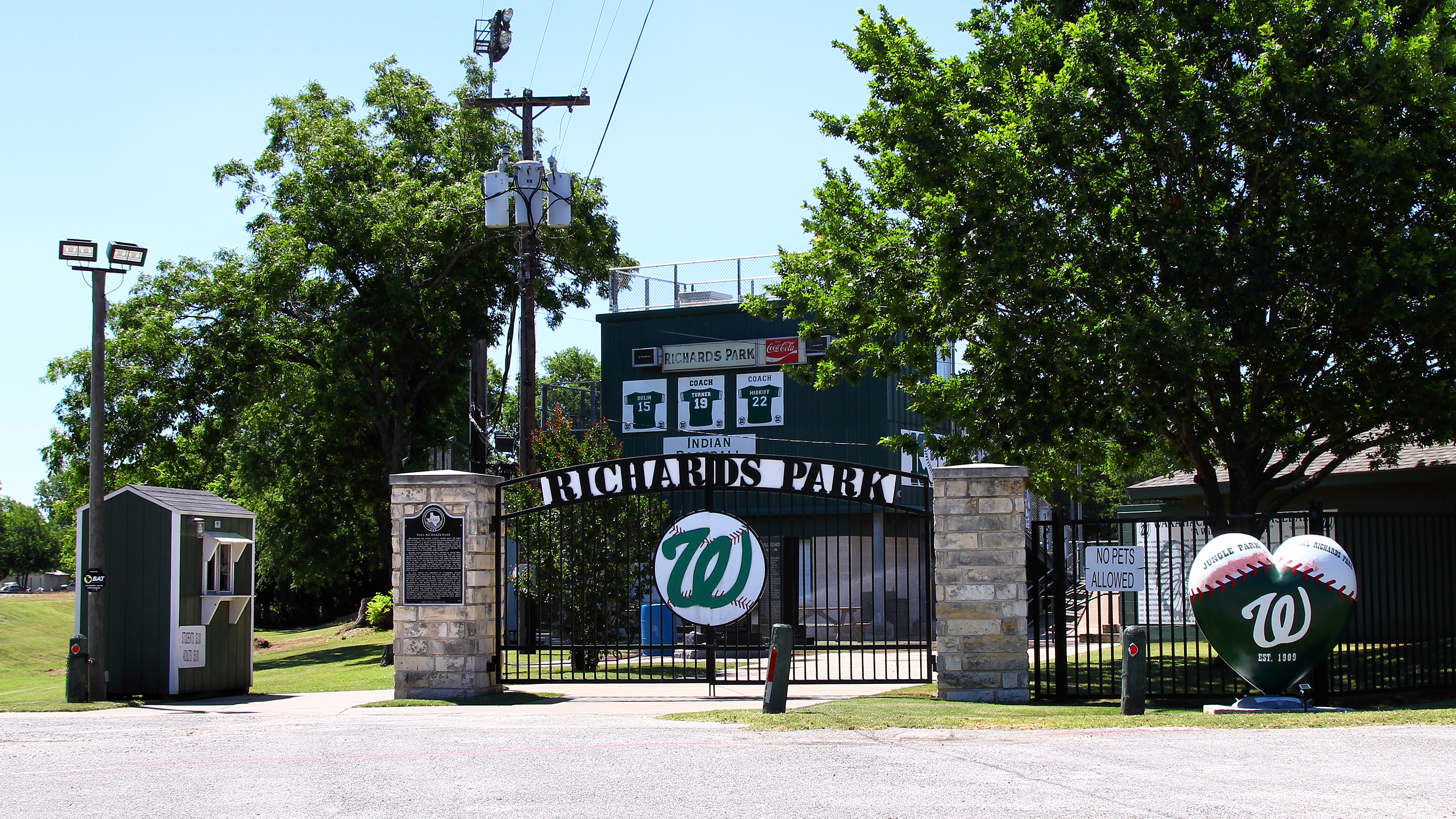
(2020) Entrance to Richards Field. Waxahachie, Texas.

The Waxahachie minor league teams were noted to have hosted home games at Jungle Park from 1914 to 1916. Opened in 1909, the ballpark was renovated in 1914 and later hosted spring training for the Detroit Tigers from 1916 to 1918, the Cincinnati Reds in 1919, and the Chicago White Sox in 1921. Today, the ballpark still in use and is named Richards Park, serving as home to the Waxahachie High School baseball team. The ballpark has a Texas Historical Marker and is located at 301 South Hawkins in Waxahachie, Texas.

== Timeline ==
Year(s)	# Yrs.	Team	Level	League	Ballpark
1914	1	Waxahachie Broncos	Class D	Central Texas League	Jungle Park (Richards Park)
1915–1916	2	Waxahachie Athletics	Class D	Central Texas League	Jungle Park (Richards Park)

== Year–by–year records ==
Year	Record	Finish	Manager	Playoffs/Notes
1914	35–23	1st	Luther Burleson / Dee Poindexter	League disbanded July 24; League champions
1915	27–34	6th	Anson Cole	League disbanded July 24
1916	26–35	5th	Dee Poindexter	League disbanded July 16

== Notable alumni ==
- Ross Youngs (1915) Inducted Baseball Hall of Fame, 1972
- Earl Smith (1916)

== See also ==
Waxahachie Athletics players
