= Belton Braves =

- 1914–1915; Belton, Texas

Minor league affiliations
- Class: Class D (1914–1915)
- League: Middle Texas League (1914–1915)

Major league affiliations
- Team: None

Minor league titles
- League titles (2): 1914; 1915
- Conference titles: 1

Team data
- Name: Belton Braves (1914–1915)
- Ballpark: Belton Baseball Park (1914–1915)

The Belton Braves were a minor league baseball team based in Belton, Texas. In 1914 and 1915, the Braves played as members of the Class D level Middle Texas League, winning the league championship in both seasons of play, with league permanently folded during the 1915 season. The Belton Braves hosted home games at the Belton Baseball Park.

== History ==
The Belton Braves became charter members of the six–team Middle Texas League in 1914. The Middle Texas League began play in the 1914 season as a Class D level minor league. Franchises from Bartlett, Texas (Bartlett Bearcats), Brenham, Texas (Brenham Brewers), Georgetown, Texas (Georgetown Collegians), Lampasas, Texas (Lampasas Resorters) and Temple, Texas (Temple Tigers) joined Belton as charter members.

The Belton Braves began play with the Middle Texas League on May 8, 1914, and won the first of two consecutive championships. The Middle Texas League played a spit–season schedule with champions during each half. In 1914, the Temple Tigers won the first–half standings and the Belton Braves won the second–half standings, with the season ending early on August 8, 1914. The final overall standings were led by the Temple Tigers, with a record of 54–27, followed by the Georgetown Collegians (50–30), Brenham Brewers (50–34), Belton Braves (37–47), Lampasas Resorters (35–51) and Bartlett Bearcats (22–59). In the Championship playoff, the Belton Braves defeated the Temple Tigers 5 games to 1 to win the 1914 championship. Temple was managed by Baseball Hall of Fame member Kid Nichols. Belton was managed by Leslie Mitchell, L.B. Hubbard, Bob Hart, Jack Forrester and Cal Callahan during the 1914 season, playing home games at the Belton Base Ball Park.

Belton folded, along with the Middle Texas League, in the middle of the 1915 season. On June 19, 1915, Belton was in first place under manager Charles Lawson when the Middle Texas League permanently folded. The Belton Braves won both half–seasons of the league and no playoffs were held as the league folded. During the season, the Austin Reps/Representatives (2–5) had moved to become the Taylor Producers on May 1, 1915, as floods forced the team to leave their ballpark in Austin. Taylor (15–23) then moved to Brenham on June 8, 1915, becoming the second team in Brenham, after the Brenham Brewers folded the day before. The final league standings were led by the Belton Braves (40–19), 8.0 games ahead of the 2nd place Temple Governors (32–27), followed by the Bartlett Bearcats (29–26) and Austin Representatives/Taylor Producers/Brenham Kaisers (21–36). The Schulenburg Giants were 23–18 and the Brenham Brewers 12–31 when they both folded on June 7, 1915.

The Middle Texas League permanently folded after the 1915 season. Belton, Texas has not hosted another minor league team.

== The ballpark ==
The Belton Braves were referenced to have played home minor league games at Belton Base Ball Park. The ballpark was located at South Davis Street & West Avenue A in Belton, Texas.

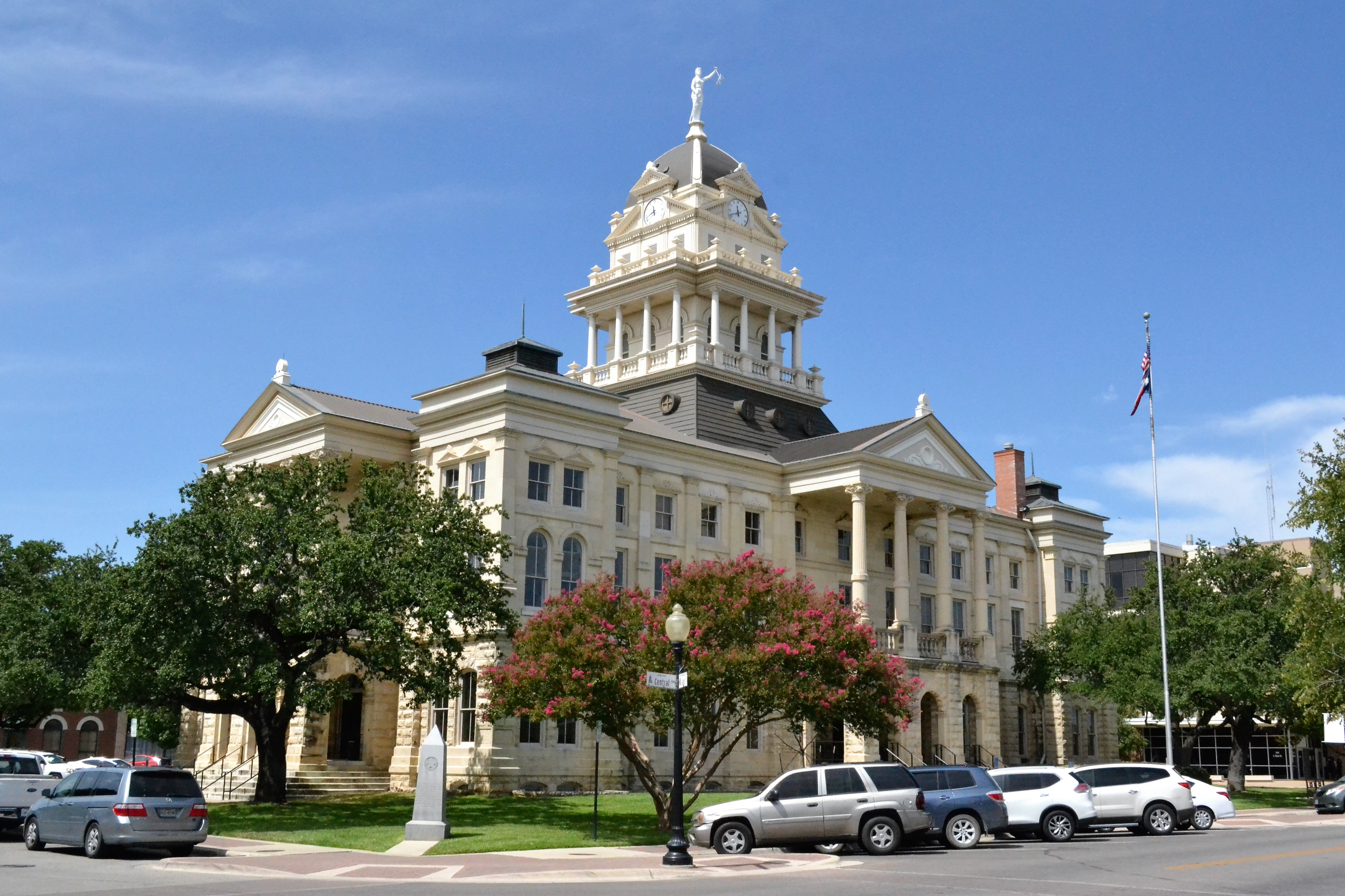
(2018) Bell County Courthouse, National Register of Historic Places. Belton, Texas

== Timeline ==
Year(s)	# Yrs.	Team	Level	League	Ballpark
1914–1915	2	Belton Braves	Class D	Middle Texas League	Belton Base Ball Park

== Year–by–year records ==
Year	Record	Finish	Manager	Playoffs/Notes
1914	37–47	4th	Leslie Mitchell / L.B. Hubbard / Bob Hart; Jack Forrester / Cal Callahan	League champions
1915	40–19	1st	Charles Lawson	League folded June 19; League champions

== Notable alumni ==
- George McAvoy (1915)
