= Kaufman Kings =

American minor league baseball team

- 1915; Kaufman, Texas

Minor league affiliations
- Class: Class D (1915)
- League: Central Texas League (1915)

Major league affiliations
- Team: None

Minor league titles
- League titles (0): None

Team data
- Name: Kaufman Kings (1915)
- Ballpark: Shannon Park* (1915)

The Kaufman Kings were a minor league baseball team based in Kaufman, Texas. In 1915, the Kings played as members of the Class D level Central Texas League in the only season of minor league baseball hosted in Kaufman.

== History ==
Minor league baseball started in Kaufman, Texas in 1915. The Kaufman Kings played their only minor league season as members of the six−team Class D level Central Texas League, which folded during the season. After beginning league play on May 17, 1915, the Central Texas League folded on July 24, 1915. The Corsicana A's, Ennis Tigers, Mexia Gassers, Terrell Cubs, Waxahachie Athletics teams joined Kaufman in league play.

In 1915, the Kings were involved in two no-hitters. On May 27, 1915, Corsicana A's pitcher Erwin threw a no−hit game against the Kaufman Kings in a 2–0 Corsicana victory. Kaufman pitcher Josh Billings pitched a no−hit game on July 15, 1915. Billings threw his no−hitter against the Ennis Tigers in a 4–0 Kaufman Kings victory.

On July 24, 1915, the Central Texas League folded before the conclusion of the season. At the time the league folded, the Kaufman Kings were in third place with a 30–32 overall record, playing under manager Dee Poindexter. Kaufman finished 5.5 games behind the first−place Ennis Tigers in the six–team standings.

The Central Texas League never returned to minor league play. Kaufman, Texas has not hosted another minor league team.

== The ballpark ==
The Kaufman Kings are noted to have likely hosted home games at the site of today's Shannon Park. Shannon Park was named in 1937 and is still in use today as a public park. Shannon Park is located at Barnes Street & Shannon Street, Kaufman, Texas.

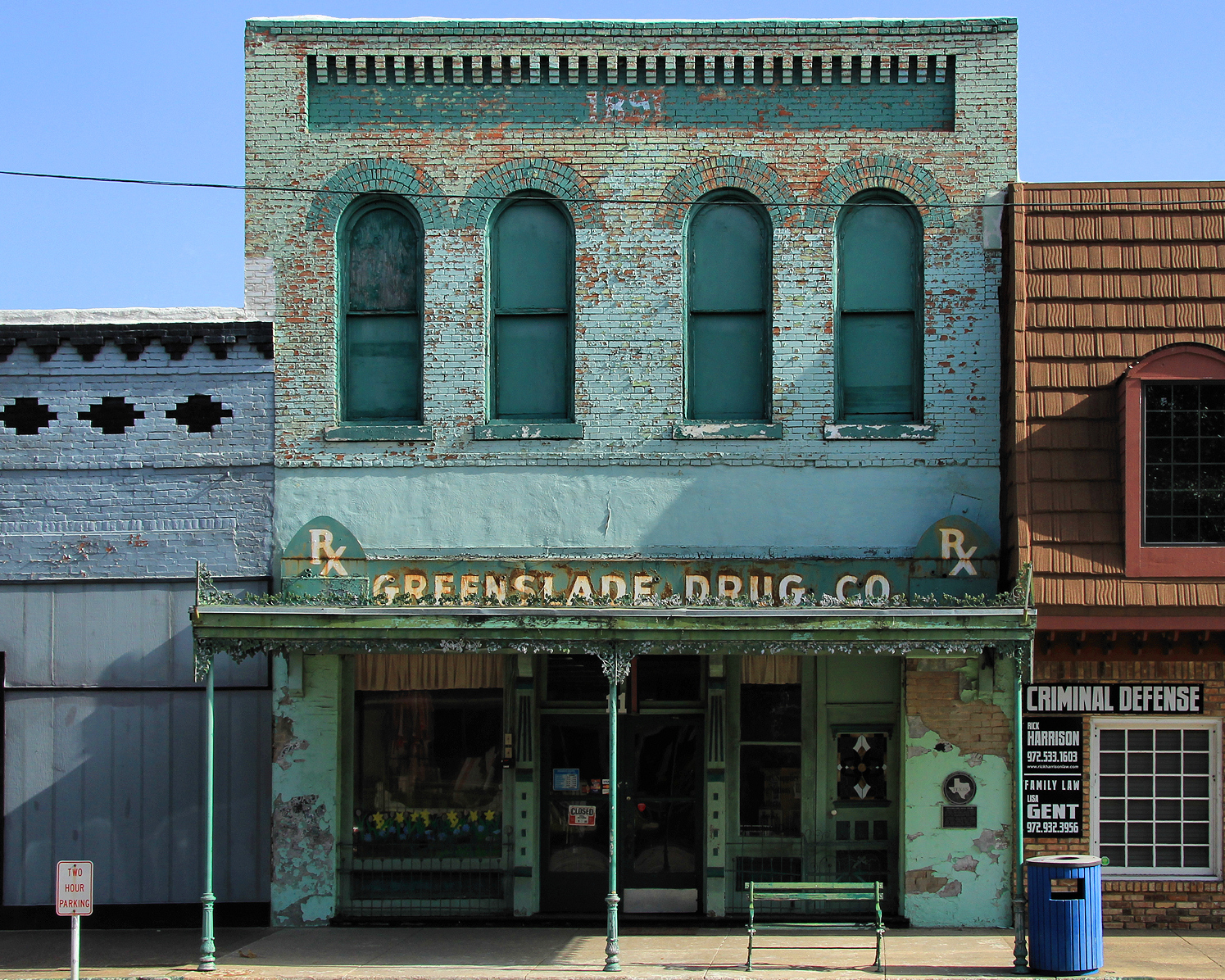
(2014) Greenslade Drug Store. Recorded Texas Historic Landmark. Kaufman, Texas

== Year–by–year record ==
Year	Record	Finish	Manager	Playoffs/Notes
1915	30–32	4th	Dee Poindexter	League disbanded July 24
