= Stan Keyes (baseball) =

American baseball player

Stanley Charles Keyes (September 9, 1898 – April 1976) was an American professional baseball outfielder who spent 17 seasons in the minor leagues, from 1924 to 1940. He won five home run crowns. He was described as having been a good judge of fly balls, having a good arm, and being a faster runner than his gait would indicate.

He was born in Peru, Illinois.

== 1920s ==
He began his career with the Rock Island Islanders, hitting .358 with a .624 slugging percentage, 20 home runs, 39 doubles and 10 triples to lead the Mississippi Valley League in home runs, slugging percentage and total bases (279). He also went 4-3 in 12 games as a pitcher that year. With the Terrell Terrors in 1925, Keyes hit .325 with 28 home runs, 15 triples and 30 doubles, while slugging .634. He also went hitless in a game with the Waco Cubs, bringing his season batting average to .322 and his slugging mark to .629. He led the Texas Association in home runs. In 1926, he played for Waco Cubs and Temple Surgeons and in 1927, he played for the Asheville Tourists. His statistical details are unknown for those years. In 1928, back with the Tourists, he hit .330 with a .535 slugging percentage, 15 home runs, 19 triples and 30 doubles in 147 games and was named to the South Atlantic League All-Star team. Keyes split 1929 between Asheville (110 games) and the Minneapolis Millers (59 games) and hit a combined .352 with 25 home runs, 229 hits, 42 doubles, 18 triples, a .587 slugging percentage and 382 total bases in 169 games. Despite spending more than a third of his season elsewhere, he still led the South Atlantic League in batting average and slugging percentage.

== 1930s ==
He dominated minor league baseball during the early part of the 1930s.

Joining the Des Moines Demons in 1930, he hit .340 with 190 hits, 35 home runs, 140 RBI, 18 triples, a .640 slugging percentage and 358 total bases. He led the Western League in home runs, RBI, slugging percentage and total bases and broke the league home run of 32, held by both Ping Bodie and Dutch Wetzel. He also played in the first night game in professional history that year, which was played against the Wichita Aviators in Des Moines on May 2. He made the All-Star team that year. And 1931 was even better. In 132 games with Des Moines, he hit .369 with 38 home runs, 160 RBI, 36 doubles, 24 triples, 203 hits, a .729 slugging percentage and 401 total bases. He won the Western League Triple Crown—leading the league in home runs, RBI and batting average—and also paced the loop in hits, slugging and total bases. He was again an All-Star and broke his own league record for home runs. His 160 RBI set an unbroken league record. He hit another home run in nine games with the Millers that year to bring his season total to 39. He moved to the Nashville Volunteers in 1932 and hit .341 with a .604 slugging mark, 210 hits, 35 home runs, 35 doubles, 11 triples and 372 total bases in 155 games. He tied Elliot Bigelow for the Southern Association league lead in games played and was the sole leader in home runs and total bases.

His career decline began in 1933. He hit .321 with a .532 slugging percentage and 11 home runs in 87 games for Nashville, but batted only .191 with two home runs in 33 games for the Houston Buffaloes to bring his season totals to .288 with a .477 slugging percentage and 13 home runs in 120 games. In 1934, he joined the Oakland Oaks of the Pacific Coast League, who whom he hit .310 with 19 home runs, 48 doubles, 211 hits and 334 total bases in 182 games. The 36-year-old returned to Oakland for 1936 and hit .293 with 17 home runs and 38 doubles in 137 games. Returning to Des Moines for 1937, he hit .287 with 20 home runs in 124 games. He suited up for the San Antonio Missions in 1938 and batted .291 with 16 home runs and 12 triples in 132 games. With the Augusta Tigers in 1938, he hit .320 with seven home runs in 134 games; he followed that with a .333 batting average and .535 slugging mark in 82 matches split between the Macon Peaches and Portsmouth Cubs in 1939.

== 1940s and career summary ==
Keyes last played for the Spartanburg Spartans in 1940, batting .281 with no home runs in 18 games. He was released in May.

Though his statistical record is incomplete, it is known he hit at least 297 home runs, 448 doubles and 176 triples. Available records indicate he batted over .320 for his career, had 2,366 hits and 4,057 total bases. It is likely he had, in reality, close to 2,600 hits, over 300 home runs, around 500 doubles and 200 or more triples for his career.
