= 1925 New York-Pennsylvania League season =

The 1925 New York–Pennsylvania League season was the league's third season of play. The York White Roses and the Williamsport Grays tied during the regular season and were declared co-champions. An unofficial playoff resulted in York defeating Williamsport 4-2. The New York–Pennsylvania League played at the Class B level during this season.

== Final standings ==
New York–Pennsylvania League
Club	Wins	Losses	Win %	GB
York White Roses	77	55	.583	--
Williamsport Grays	77	55	.583	--
Binghamton Triplets	65	63	.508	10.0
Elmira Colonels	66	65	.504	10.5
Scranton Miners	64	69	.481	13.5
Harrisburg Senators	61	69	.469	15.0
Wilkes-Barre Barons	60	71	.458	16.5
Shamokin Shammies	54	77	.412	22.5

== Stats ==
=== Batting leaders ===
Stat	Player	Total
AVG	Joe Munson (Harrisburg)	.400
HR	Joe Munson (Harrisburg)	33
RBI	Joe Munson (Harrisburg)	129
R		
H		
SB		

=== Pitching leaders ===
Stat	Player	Total
W	Thomas George (York)	27
L		
ERA	Thomas George (York)	2.27
SO	Henry Hoffman (Williamsport)	153
IP		
SV		
