= Ennis Tigers =

- 1914–1917; Ennis, Texas

Minor league affiliations
- Class: Class D (1914–1917)
- League: Central Texas League (1914–1917)

Major league affiliations
- Team: None

Minor league titles
- League titles (1): 1915

Team data
- Name: Ennis Tigers (1914–1917)
- Ballpark: Unknown (1914–1917)

The Ennis Tigers were a minor league baseball franchise based in Ennis, Texas. From 1914 to 1917, the Tigers played exclusively as members of the Class D level Central Texas League. Ennis played for the duration of the Central Texas League, winning the 1915 league championship.

== History ==
The Ennis Tigers first began minor league play in 1914, when the Tigers became charter members of the Central Texas League, which formed as a Class D level six–team minor league. The Ennis Tigers would play in all four seasons of the Central Season League and Ed Wicker would manage all four Ennis teams. The charter members of the Central Texas League were the Corsicana Athletics, Hillsboro, Texas, Italy, Texas, Waxahachie Buffaloes and West, Texas teams, who joined Ennis in beginning league play.

In their first season of league play, the Ennis Tigers and the Central Texas League members began play on May 10, 1914, but the league did not complete the season. The Central Texas League was scheduled to play a split–season schedule, but the second half was shortened when the league folded on July 25, 1914. Overall, Ennis had a 31–28 record, which placed third in the overall standings, 4.5 games behind the first place Waxahachie Buffaloes. After the league stopped play, the Central Texas League did have a playoff as the Waxahachie Buffaloes defeated West 3 games to 2.

After folding the previous season, the 1915, the Central Texas League reformed and the Ennis Tigers won the championship in a shortened season.> Joining the Ennis Tigers in the 1915 Central Texas League were the Corsicana A's, Kaufman Kings, Mexia Gassers, Terrell Cubs and Waxahachie Athletics. Beginning play on May 17, 1915, the Central Texas League folded before the season ended. On July 24, 1915, the Central Texas League folded. The Ennis Tigers had the best overall record in the 1915 Central Texas League. The Ennis Tigers won the first–half of the Central Texas League planned split–season schedule. The Mexia Gassers won the shortened second half of the schedule. No playoffs were held and Ennis had the best overall record at 35–26, finishing 3.0 games ahead of the second place Corsicana A's in the overall standings.

The Ennis Tigers continued play as the 1916 Central Texas League again reformed. The Tigers finished in second place overall after rejoining the league. The Central Texas League began their third season of play on April 28, 1916. The league members joining Ennis in 1916 were the Marlin Marlins, Mexia Gassers, Temple Governors, Terrell Terrors and Waxahachie Athletics teams. Ennis and the Central Texas League disbanded on July 16, 1916, without playoffs. At 36–25, the Temple Governors had the league's best record when it folded, 1.0 game ahead of the Ennis Tigers, who finished with a 35–26 record.

The 1917 Ennis Tigers and the Central Texas League played their final seasons, with the league folding before completing the schedule. The 1917 Central Texas League played as a four–team league before permanently folding before on June 6, 1917. The Central Texas League began play on May 21, 1917, with Marlin Marlins, Mexia Gassers and Temple Governors joining Ennis in the league play. On June 6, 1917, the Central Texas League permanently folded. At the time the league folded, the Mexia Gassers had the best overall record at 8–6, just 0.5 games ahead of the Ennis Tigers who were 8–7. No playoffs were held.

After the Central Texas League permanently folded, Ennis, Texas has not hosted another minor league franchise.

== The ballpark ==
The name of the ballpark hosting the Ennis Tigers for minor league play is unknown.

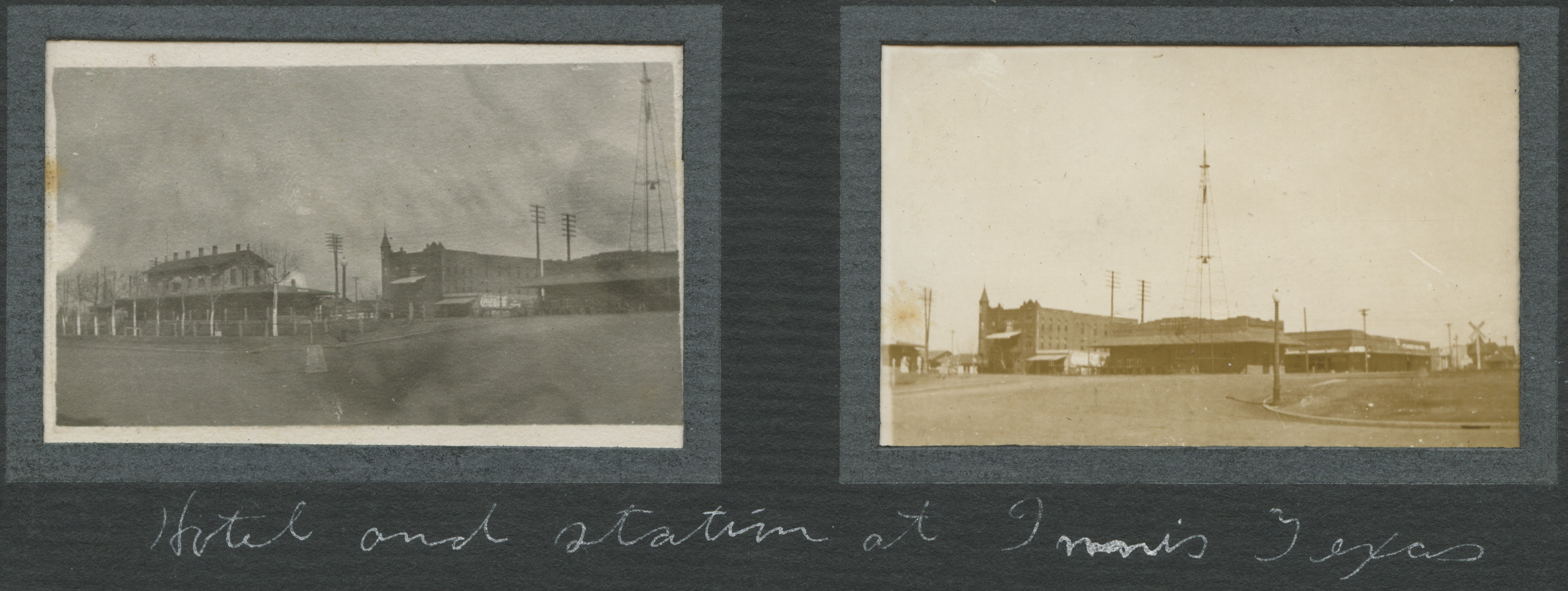
(1917) Ennis, Texas (cropped photo)

== Timeline ==
Year(s)	# Yrs.	Team	Level	League
1914–1917	4	Ennis Tigers	Class D	Central Texas League

== Year–by–year records ==
Year	Record	Finish	Manager	Playoffs/Notes
1914	31–28	3rd	Ed Wicker	League disbanded July 25
1915	35–26	1st	Ed Wicker	League disbanded July 24; League champions
1916	35–26	2nd	Ed Wicker	League disbanded July 16
1917	8–7	2nd	Ed Wicker	League disbanded June 6

== Notable alumni ==
- Roy Leslie (1914, 1916)
- Jim Walkup (1916)

=== See also ===
Ennis Tigers players
