= Bartlett Independent School District =

School district in Texas, United States

Location
- Bartlett, Texas ESC Region 13 USA
- Coordinates: 30°47′48″N 97°25′20″W

District information
- Type: Independent school district
- Grades: Pre-K through 12
- Superintendent: Josiah Lee Uson
- Schools: 3 (2009-10)
- NCES District ID: 4809540

Students and staff
- Students: 381 (2010-11)
- Teachers: 36.17 (2009-10) (on full-time equivalent (FTE) basis)
- Student–teacher ratio: 10.73 (2009-10)
- Athletic conference: UIL Class 1A Football Division II
- District mascot: Bulldogs
- Colors: Royal Blue, White

Other information
- TEA District Accountability Rating for 2011: Academically Acceptable
- Website: Bartlett ISD

Bartlett Independent School District is a public school district based in Bartlett, Texas. Predominantly located in Bell County, portions of the district extend into Williamson and Milam counties.

== Finances ==
As of the 2010–2011 school year, the appraised valuation of property in the district was $86,161,000. The maintenance tax rate was $0.104 and the bond tax rate was $0.011 per $100 of appraised valuation.

== Academic achievement ==
In 2011, the school district was rated "academically acceptable" by the Texas Education Agency.

== Schools ==
As of 2011–2012, the district had three schools.

=== Regular instructional ===
- Bartlett School (Grades PK-12)

=== JJAEP instructional ===
- Williamson County JJAEP
- Bell County JJAEP

=== Closed schools ===
- Bartlett Elementary School.

The elementary school was last given separate accountability ratings in 2007.

== See also ==
- List of school districts in Texas
