= Oil City Park =

Ballpark in Ennis, Texas, US

Oil City Park was a ballpark located in Ennis, Texas, and was the venue where the Corsicana Oil Citys beat the Texarkana Casketmakers 51-3 on Sunday June 15, 1902. The Oil Citys had to move the game there due to the blue laws in place in Corsicana at the time. The ballpark was a bandbox with right field being anywhere from 140 feet to 210 feet from home plate while the rest of the park was just as hitter-friendly. The game lasted 2 hours and 10 minutes, the Oil Citys scored 51 runs on 59 base hits, including 20 home runs; Texarkana, however, collected 3 runs and no home runs. Nig Clarke knocked 8 home runs in 8 at-bats with anywhere from 16 to 20 RBIs, though RBIs were not an official statistic at the time. The 51 runs by Corsicana are the most runs scored by a team for a single game in Texas League history.

== Sources ==
- "Baseball in the Lone Star State: Texas League's Greatest Hits," Tom Kayser and David King, Trinity University Press 2005
