= Central Texas League =

- Classification: Class D (1914–1917)
- Sport: Minor League Baseball
- First season: 1914
- Folded: June 6, 1917
- President: A. M. Frazier (1914); Hulen P. Robertson (1915); Earl C. Brown (1915–1916); Jack C. Castellaw (1916); Earl C. Smith (1917)
- No. of teams: 11
- Country: United States of America
- Most titles: 1 Waxahachie Buffaloes (1914); Ennis Tigers (1915); Temple Governors (1916); Mexia Gassers (1917)

The Central Texas League was a minor league baseball league that played from 1914 to 1917. The Central Texas League played as a six–team Class D level league and consisted of teams based exclusively in Texas. The Central Texas League never completed a full season in its four seasons of play and was sometimes called the Central Texas Trolley League. The Ennis Tigers played in each season of the league, which had a different champion each season.

== History ==
The Central Texas League began play in 1914, as a six–team Class D level minor league, with all six franchises based in Texas. The first league president was A.M. Frazier. The Corsicana Athletics, Ennis Tigers, Hillsboro, Texas, Italy, Texas, Waxahachie Buffaloes and West, Texas teams were the charter franchises. The league was also known informally as the Central Texas Trolley League in its inception.

In their first season of league play, the league played a split schedule. After Central Texas League games began on May 10, 1914, the second half was shortened when the league ceased play on July 25, 1914. After the league stopped play the Central Texas League did have a playoff. The Waxahachie Buffaloes won the first half standings (26–15) and West won the shortened second half standings. In the playoff, the Waxahachie Buffaloes won the championship when they defeated West 3 games to 2.

In 1915, the Central Texas League reformed and the league began play on May 17, 1915 with six members. The six teams in 1915 were the Corsicana A's, Ennis Tigers, Kaufman Kings, Mexia Gassers, Terrell Cubs and Waxahachie Athletics. The 1915 league presidents were Earl C. Brown and Hulen P. Robertson. The league folded on July 24, 1915. The Ennis Tigers won the first half of the schedule. The Mexia Gassers won the second half of the schedule. No playoffs were held and Ennis had the best overall record at 35–26, 3.0 games ahead of the Corsicana A's.

The Central Texas League formed again and began play on April 28, 1916. The six league members in 1916 were the Ennis Tigers, Marlin Marlins, Mexia Gassers, Temple Governors, Terrell Terrors and Waxahachie Athletics. The 1916 league presidents were Earl C. Brown and Jack C. Castellaw. The league disbanded July 16, 1916. At 36–25, the Temple Governors had the best overall record, 1.0 game ahead of the Ennis Tigers, who finished with a 35–26 record.

The Central Texas League played its final season in 1917. The league dropped two franchises and began play in 1917 as a four–team league before permanently folding before the season was completed. The Central Texas League began play on May 21, 1917 with the Ennis Tigers, Marlin Marlins, Mexia Gassers and Temple Governors as the four league members. The league president was Earl C. Smith. On June 1, 1917, the Temple Governors franchise, with a 4–4 record moved to become the Corsicana Athletics. On June 6, 1917 the Central Texas League permanently folded. The Mexia Gassers had the best overall record at 8–6 when the league folded. No playoffs were held.

== Central Texas League teams ==
Team name(s)	City represented	Ballpark	Year(s) active
Corsicana Athletics	Corsicana, Texas	Athletic Park	1914 to 1915, 1917
Ennis Tigers	Ennis, Texas	Unknown	1914 to 1917
Hillsboro	Hillsboro, Texas	Hillsboro City Park	1914
Italy	Italy, Texas	Italy High School*	1914
Kaufman Kings	Kaufman, Texas	Shannon Park*	1915
Marlin Marlins	Marlin, Texas	Marlin City Park	1916 to 1917
Mexia Gassers	Mexia, Texas	Gusher Park	1915 to 1917
Temple Governors	Temple, Texas	Unknown	1916 to 1917
Terrell Cubs 1915; Terrell Terrors 1916	Terrell, Texas	Gill Park	1915 to 1916
Waxahachie Buffaloes 1914; Waxahachie Athletics 1915-1916	Waxahachie, Texas	Jungle Park	1914 to 1916
West	West, Texas	West High School*	1914

== Standings & statistics ==
=== 1914 Central Texas League ===
Team standings	W	L	PCT	GB	Managers
Waxahachie Buffaloes	35	23	.603	–	Luther Burleson / Dee Poindexter
West	29	26	.527	4½	Eli Walker
Ennis Tigers	31	28	.525	4½	Ed Wicker
Italy	29	29	.500	6	T.A. Craig
Corsicana Athletics	26	32	.448	9	Gus Kennedy
Hillsboro	21	33	.389	12	L.C. Eastland

Season ended July 25.
Playoff: Waxahachie 3 games, West 2.

Player statistics
Player	Team	Stat	Tot
Shafer	Waxahachie	BA	.294
Speed	Corsicana	Runs	32
Querry	West	Hits	40
Darnaby	West	HR	4

=== 1915 Central Texas League ===
Team standings	W	L	PCT	GB	Managers
Ennis Tigers	35	26	.574	–	Ed Wicker
Corsicana A's	32	29	.525	3	Roy Morton
Terrell Cubs	32	30	.516	3½	Hank Griffin
Kaufman Kings	30	32	.484	5½	Dee Poindexter
Mexia Gassers	28	33	.459	7	Roy Akin
Waxahachie Athletics	27	34	.443	8	Anson Cole

League disbanded July 24.

Player statistics
Player	Team	Stat	Tot	Player	Team	Stat	Tot
Fred Wende; Wilson White	Ennis; Terrell	BA	.3026.3025	Bugs Reynolds	Terrell	W	12
A.R. Shelton	Corsicana	Runs	49	Bugs Reynolds	Terrell	SO	157
A.R. Shelton	Corsicana	Hits	59	Ben Davenport	Mexia	PCT	.750 6–2
Roy Leslie; Wilson White	Ennis; Terrell	HR	7				

=== 1916 Central Texas League ===
Team standings	W	L	PCT	GB	Managers
Temple Governors	36	25	.590	–	Paul Trammell
Ennis Tigers	35	26	.574	1	Ed Wicker
Mexia Gassers	32	29	.525	4	Roy Akin / Grady White
Terrell Terrors	29	32	.475	7	Hank Griffin / Lester Pratt; Doc Nance
Waxahachie Athletics	26	35	.426	10	Dee Poindexter
Marlin Marlins	25	36	.410	11	Bob Tarleton / Bob Countryman; Fielder Murray

League disbanded July 16.

Player statistics
Player	Team	Stat	Tot	Player	Team	Stat	Tot
Roy Leslie	Ennis	BA	.359	Lester Gaines	Ennis	W	15
Babe Green	Ennis	Runs	65	Ray Francis	Temple	SO	126
A. Edens	Ennis	Hits	68	Ted Bowen	Mexia	ERA	1.26
A. Edens	Ennis	HR	10	Lester Gaines	Ennis	Pct	.750; 15-5
W.C. Comstock	Marlin	HR	10	Ossee Ball	Temple	Pct	.750; 9–3

=== 1917 Central Texas League ===
Team standings	W	L	PCT	GB	Managers
Mexia Gassers	8	6	.571	–	Roy Akin
Ennis Tigers	8	7	.533	½	Ed Wicker
Marlin Marlins	7	8	.467	1½	H. Sinclair / Ray Wakefield
Temple Governors / Corsicana Athletics	6	8	.429	2	Charles Roberts

League disbanded June 6

Player statistics
Player	Team	Stat	Tot	Player	Team	Stat	Tot
A.V. Freeman	Ennis	W	3	Carl Hill	Mexia	Pct	.750; 3–1
Carl Hill	Mexia	W	3	A.V. Freeman	Ennis	IP	57
F.D. Poteet	Mexia	W	3				

== Baseball Hall of Fame alumni ==
- Ross Youngs, (1915) Waxahachie Athletics, Inducted 1972
