= Richards Park (Waxahachie, Texas) =

Baseball field in Waxahachie, Texas, US

Coordinates: 32.385818°N 96.855255°W

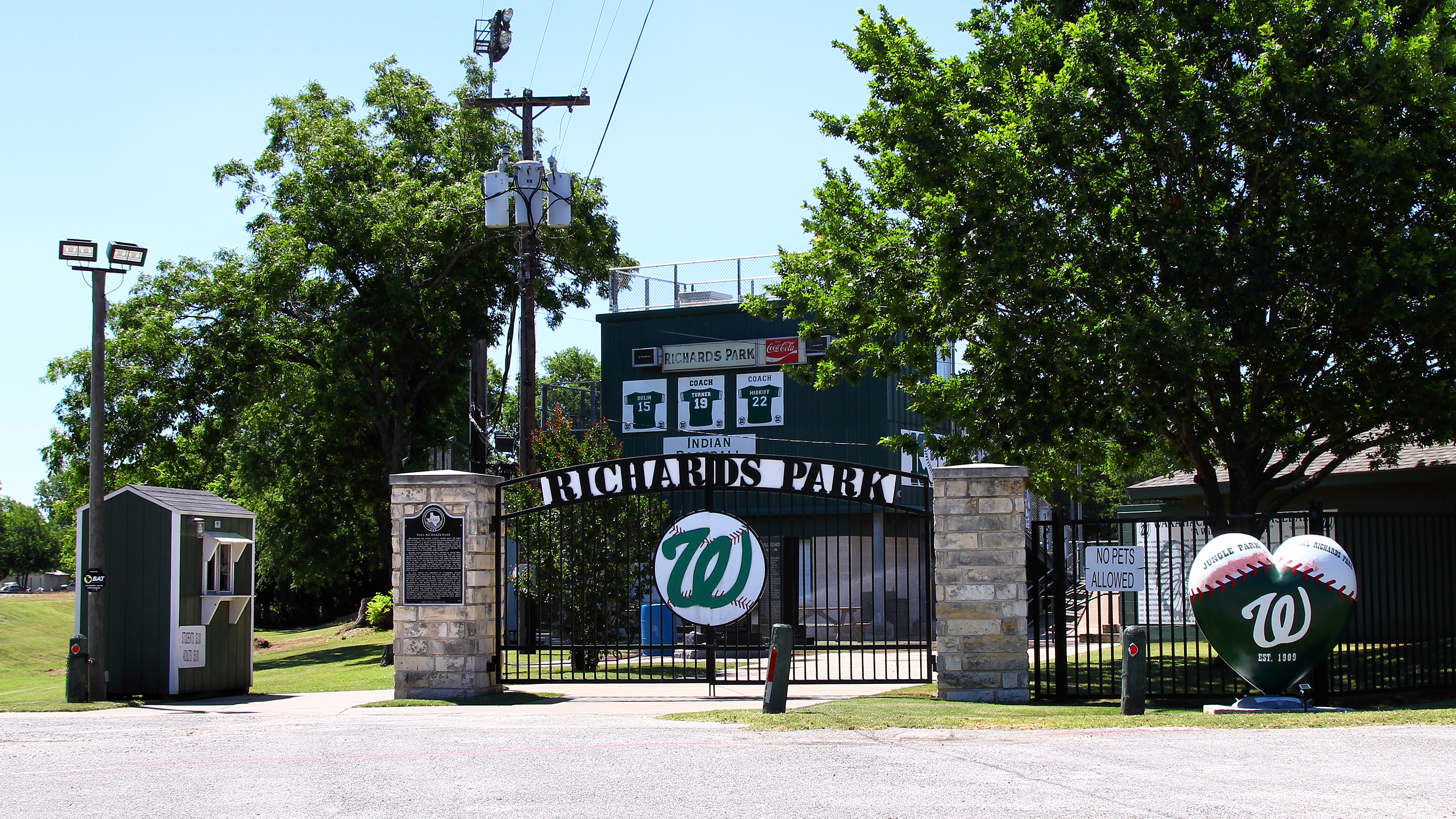
Entrance to Richards Park

Richards Park is a baseball field located in Waxahachie, Texas, currently serving as the primary home of the Waxahachie High School baseball team. It opened before 1914, has been renovated many times since, and was home to three Major League teams for Spring Training in the early 20th century. It was originally named Jungle Park, and was renamed in 1946 for former MLB player and manager Paul Richards. The capacity is approximately 1,500 spectators.

== History ==
Richards Park, located near Waxahachie Creek and the Waxahachie City Cemetery, began its life in the early 20th century. In 1915, a grandstand was hastily constructed to entice a major league team to come to Waxahachie for spring training. An agreement was struck for the Detroit Tigers to use the facility for 1916 and 1917, and the stadium was christened Jungle Park in honor of its tenant. The Cincinnati Reds would use the facility in 1919, and the Chicago White Sox would be the last major league team to hold spring training in Waxahachie in 1921. The minor league Kansas City Blues also held spring training at Jungle Park in the 1920s.

Jungle Park was also home to the Waxahachie Athletics of the Class D Central Texas League from 1914 to 1916.

In 1922, the Waxahachie Chamber of Commerce began managing the property. That same year, a flood damaged the site and the grandstand was dismantled for use at the WHS campus. The field, however, remained in use, and was briefly known as Woodmen Park, after the Woodmen of the World-organized team that played there.

By 1946, the field had fallen into disrepair. Richards, a Waxahachie native, and several locals raised enough money to restore and reopen the park in April of that year with lights and a terrace system to prevent flooding. The field was subsequently named for Richards.

In 1965, the site was purchased by Waxahachie ISD.
