= Bartlett Bearcats =

- 1914–1915; Bartlett, Texas

Minor league affiliations
- Class: Class D (1914–1915)
- League: Middle Texas League (1914–1915)

Major league affiliations
- Team: None

Minor league titles
- League titles (0): None

Team data
- Name: Bartlett Bearcats (1914–1915)
- Ballpark: Bartlett Baseball Park (1914–1915)

The Bartlett Bearcats were a minor league baseball team based in Bartlett, Texas. In 1914 and 1915., the Bearcats played exclusively as members of the Class D level Middle Texas League. The Bartlett Bearcats hosted home minor league games at the Bartlett Baseball Park.

Baseball Hall of Fame inductee Ross Youngs played for the 1915 Bartlett Bearcats at age 18.

== History ==
The Bartlett Bearcats became charter members of the Class D level Middle Texas League in 1914. The Middle Texas League began play as a six–team league 1914 season. The franchises from Belton, Texas (Belton Braves), Brenham, Texas (Brenham Brewers), Georgetown, Texas (Georgetown Collegians), Lampasas, Texas (Lampasas Resorters) and Temple, Texas (Temple Tigers) joined Bartlett in league play.

The Bartlett Bearcats began play in the Middle Texas League on May 8, 1914, and finished last in the league standings. The Middle Texas League played a spit–season schedule with champions during each half. The Bartlett Bearcats did not win either half–season and placed sixth in the overall standings. Bartlett finished 32.0 games behind first place Temple, with an overall record of 22–59, playing under manager Robert Roundtree. The final overall standings featured the first place Temple Tigers (54–27), followed by the Georgetown Collegians (50–30), Brenham Brewers (50–34), Belton Braves (37–47), Lampasas Resorters (35–51) and Bartlett Bearcats (22–59).

The 1915 Middle Texas League folded in the middle of the 1915 season after having reduced to a four–team league after the season began. The Middle Texas League permanently folded on June 19, 1915, with the Bartlett Bearcats in 3rd place under manager Ike Pendleton with a 29–26 overall record. The final league standings were led by the first place the Belton Braves (40–19) finishing 8.0 games ahead of the second place Temple Governors (32–27), followed by Bartlett (29–26) and the Austin Representatives/Taylor Producers/Brenham Kaisers (21–36). The Schulenburg Giants and Brenham Brewers franchised had both folded on June 7, 1915.

Baseball Hall of Fame inductee Ross Youngs played for the 1915 Bartlett Bearcats. At age 18, Youngs hit .264 in 239 at bats for the Bearcats.

The Middle Texas League never returned to minor league play. Bartlett, Texas has not hosted another minor league team after the folding of the Middle Texas League.

== The ballpark ==
The Bartlett Bearcats were noted to have played their home games at the Bartlett Base Ball Park. The site was cited to have possibly been located on Powell Boulevard between Lilian Street and Robinson Street, Bartlett, Texas.

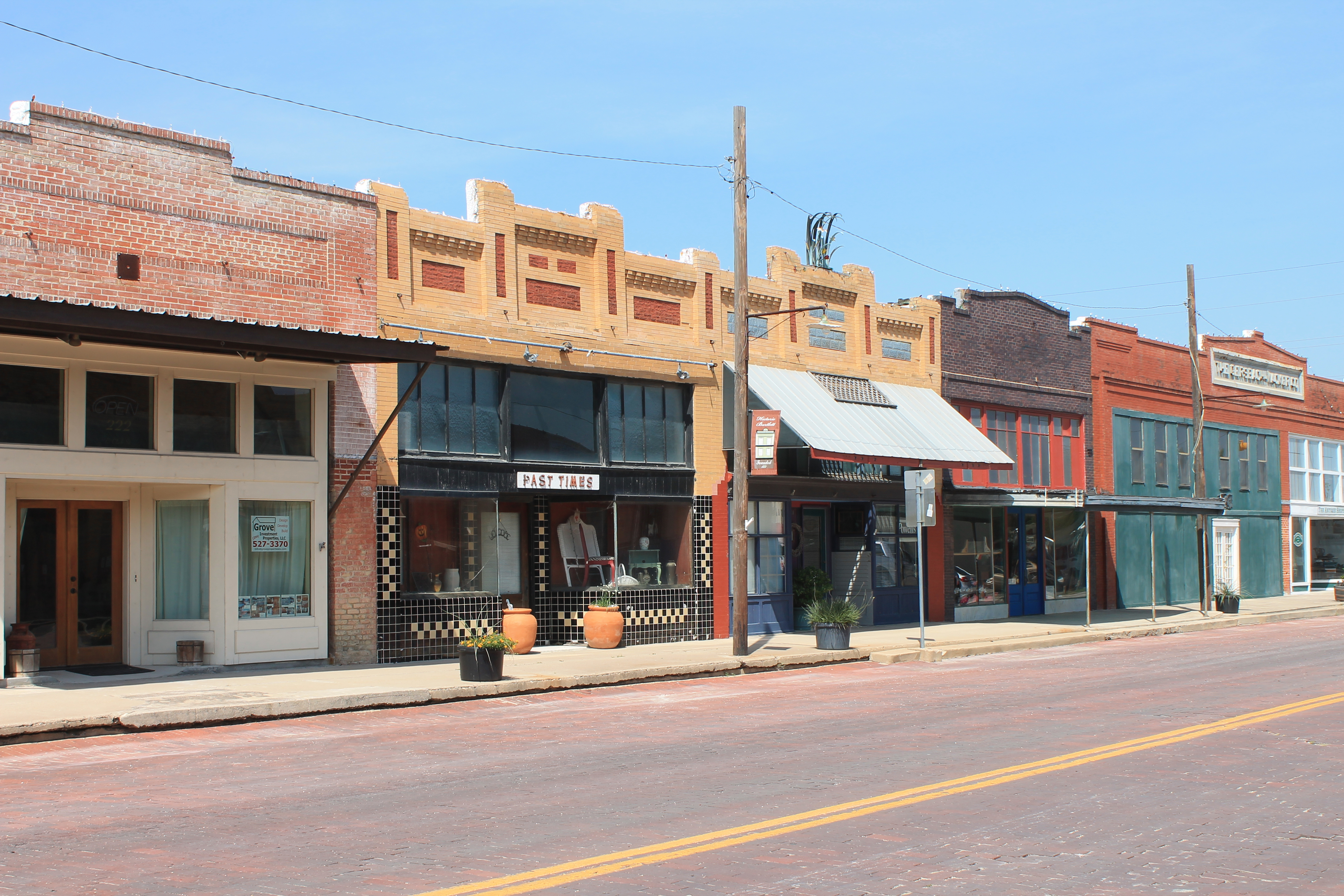
(2013) Bartlett Commercial Historic District. Bartlett, Texas

== Timeline ==
Year(s)	# Yrs.	Team	Level	League	Ballpark
1914–1915	2	Bartlett Bearcats	Class D	Middle Texas League	Bartlett Baseball Park

== Year–by–year records ==
Year	Record	Finish	Manager	Playoffs/Notes
1914	22–59	6th	Robert Roundtree	None held
1915	29–26	3rd	Ike Pendleton	League folded June 19

== Notable alumni ==
- Gene Bailey (1915)
- Rollie Naylor (1915)
- Ross Youngs (1915) Inducted Baseball Hall of Fame, 1972

=== See also ===
Bartlett (minor league baseball) players
