= Bartlett High School (Texas) =

Location
- 404 North Robinson; Bartlett, Bell County, Texas 76511-0170; United States; 30.7971°N 97.4213°W

Information
- School type: Public, high school
- Established: 1916
- Locale: Town: Distant
- School district: Bartlett ISD
- NCES School ID: 480954000406
- Principal: Bryan Hernandez
- Teaching staff: 40.24 (on an FTE basis)
- Grades: PK–12
- Enrollment: 393 (2025–2026)
- Student to teacher ratio: 9.77
- Colors: Blue, gray and white
- Athletics conference: UIL Class 2A
- Mascot: Bulldogs/Lassies
- Website: Bartlett High School

Bartlett High School is a public high school located in Bartlett, Texas, USA. It is part of the Bartlett Independent School District located in Bell County just north of the Bell-Williamson county line, and is classified as a 2A school by the UIL. During 2022–2023, Bartlett High School had an enrollment of 461 students and a student to teacher ratio of 11.49. The school received an overall rating of "C" from the Texas Education Agency for the 2024–2025 school year.

== Demographics ==
The demographic breakdown of the 393 students enrolled for the 2025-2026 school year was:

- Male - 56%
- Female - 44%
- Hispanic - 62.0%
- White - 26.2%
- Black - 9.3%
- Two or More Races - 2.3%
- Asian - 0.2%
- Native Hawaiian/Pacific Islander - 0%
- American Indian/Alaska Native - 0%

== History ==
The school was established in 1916 by Mr V.I. Moore, superintendent from 1916 to 1925, who left Bartlett to assume a faculty position at the University Of Texas. Mr Swope, chief administrator from 1948 to 1966, retired after overseeing the construction of the 1974 high school building. The Old High School was built in 1917, at a cost of approximately $20,000. The auditorium and additional classrooms were added in 1924 at a cost of about $40,000. The class of 1918 was the first to graduate from the building and from Bartlett High School; the class of 1966 was the last to graduate from the old high school.

Students moved to a new school building in 1966 when Bartlett High School consolidated with the Bartlett Colored School.

In 2000, the newest building was built, and it is still the only high school in Bartlett.

Bartlett High School has historically had acceptable ratings on the State Mandated test (TAKS).

The Bartlett Independent school district motto is, "We Are the Bulldog pack listen to us bark, be kind, accept responsibility, respect each other, keep doing your best, woof woof woof."

== Academics ==
Bartlett High School has usually done very well academically. It had acceptable ratings on the TAKS Test in 2007 and 2008. In the past few years, more and more students from Bartlett are being accepted into Division I universities and colleges.

== Programs ==
Bartlett High School has several programs including S.T.A.R.S. program, UIL programs, One Act Play Club, Spanish Club, Entomology Team, FFA and much more. The Bartlett FFA Club has been successful in many ways at the Bell County Youth Fair. Bartlett also has a business club that allows many students to go on to get scholarships.

== Athletics ==
The Bartlett Bulldogs compete in the following sports:

- American football
- Baseball
- Basketball
- Cross country
- Softball
- Track and field
- Volleyball

=== State titles ===
Bartlett (UIL)

- American football
  - 1990(1A), 1992(1A), 1999(1A)

Bartlett Colored (PVIL)

- American football
  - 1964(PVIL-A)

==== State finalists ====
Bartlett (UIL)

- Boys' basketball
  - 1980(1A), 1983(2A)
