= Harvey Grubb =

American baseball player (1890-1970)

- Third baseman
- Born: September 18, 1890; Lexington, North Carolina, U.S.
- Died: January 25, 1970 (aged 79); Corpus Christi, Texas, U.S.
- Batted: Right Threw: Right

MLB debut
- September 27, 1912, for the Cleveland Naps

Last MLB appearance
- September 27, 1912, for the Cleveland Naps

MLB statistics
- Plate Appearances: 1
- Hit by Pitch: 1
- On-base percentage: 1.000
- Stats at Baseball Reference

Teams
- Cleveland Naps (1912)

Harvey Harrison Grubb (September 18, 1890 – January 25, 1970) was an American Major League Baseball third baseman for one game on September 27, 1912. He also had a long minor league career which lasted from 1909 to 1924. He batted and threw right-handed, and was 6 feet tall and 165 pounds.

Grubb made his professional debut with the Greensboro Champs of the Carolina Association in 1909, and had a .180 batting average in 14 games with them. In 1910, he played for the Winston-Salem Twins of the Carolina Association, and hit .116 in 12 games. Grubb spent the 1911 and 1912 seasons with the Morristown Jobbers of the Appalachian League and had a .275 average both years, playing in 97 and 101 games, respectively. At the end of the season, Grubb was brought onto the Cleveland Naps major league roster. He played in a game on September 27, 1912 and was hit by pitch in his only plate appearance after coming into the game in relief of Terry Turner in a 16-5 win against the Detroit Tigers.

It ended up being the only major league game of his career, as the following year he was sent back to the minor leagues. After not playing professionally in 1913, he played for the Waco Navigators from 1914 to 1917, appearing in a career-high 158 games in 1917. He did not play in 1918, but returned to Waco in 1919, then joined the Wichita Falls Spudders during the 1920 season. He played for the Galveston Pirates in 1921, and had a career-high batting average of .291. He spent the final three seasons of his career with the Corsicana Oilers, and served as the team's manager in 1923 as well. In his final season, Grubb had a batting average of .288 in 109 games.
