= Dick Whitworth =

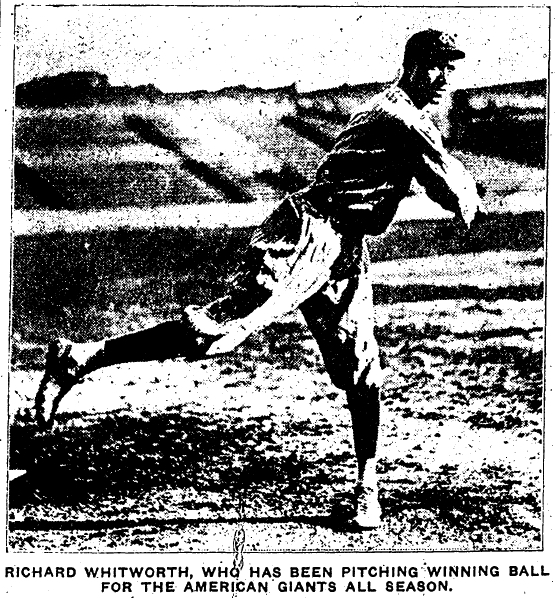
- Pitcher
- Born: August 28, 1895; St. Louis, Missouri, U.S.
- Died: March 1, 1966 (aged 70); St. Louis, Missouri, U.S.
- Batted: Right Threw: Right

Negro leagues debut
- 1914, for the Chicago Union Giants

Last Negro leagues appearance
- 1924, for the Chicago American Giants

Negro leagues (Note: On December 16, 2020, Major League Baseball declared certain Negro leagues, from the span of 1920–1948, to be "major" leagues. Whitworth's statistics reflect his time in the Negro leagues from 1922 and 1924.) statistics
- Win–loss record: 12–10
- Earned run average: 5.53
- Strikeouts: 65

Teams
- Chicago Union Giants (1914–1916); Chicago American Giants (1915–1919, 1922, 1924); Hilldale Club (1920–1921); Gilkerson's Union Giants (1926, 1930)

Richard Henderson Whitworth (August 28, 1895 – March 1966) was an American pitcher in baseball's Negro leagues and pre-Negro leagues.

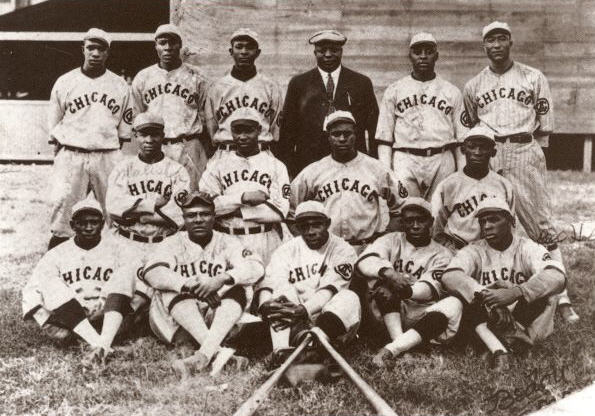
1919 Chicago American Giants

Born in St. Louis, Missouri, Whitworth played most of his career for Chicago teams the Chicago Union Giants and the Chicago American Giants.

On September 23, 1922, Whitworth broke his leg after he exited a vehicle in Anderson, Indiana and another car struck it, crashing into him.

Research shows Whitworth stood 6' 5", and weighed 215 pounds.

He died at the age of 70 in St. Louis, Missouri.
