= Mexia Gassers =

- 1915–1917; Mexia, Texas

Minor league affiliations
- Class: Class D (1915–1917)
- League: Central Texas League (1915–1917)

Major league affiliations
- Team: None

Minor league titles
- League titles (1): 1917

Team data
- Name: Mexia Gassers (1915–1917)
- Ballpark: Gusher Park (1915–1917)

The Mexia Gassers were a minor league baseball franchise based in Mexia, Texas. From 1915 to 1917, the Gassers played exclusively as members of the Class D level Central Texas League. The Gassers played the final three seasons of the Central Texas League before the league permanently folded, winning the league championship in the shortened 1917 season. The 1922 Mexia Gushers followed the Gassers in minor league play.

== History ==
Minor league baseball began in Mexia, Texas in 1915, when the "Gassers" began play as members of the six–team Class D level Central Texas League. Mexia joined the Corsicana A's, Ennis Tigers, Kaufman Kings, Terrell Cubs and Waxahachie Athletics in league play.

The "Gassers" moniker corresponded to the Mexia Gas and Oil Company discovering natural gas in the era.

Beginning league play on May 17, 1915, the Mexia Gassers finished their first season of play in fifth place, as the 1915 Central Texas League folded during the season. The league also folded during the next two seasons. The league folded for the season on July 24, 1915. With a 28–33 record, playing under manager Roy Akin, Mexia finished 7.0 games behind the first place Ennis Tigers in the final standings.

In their second season of play, the 1916 Mexia Gassers continued Central Texas League play. The Gassers ended a shortened Central Texas League season in third place in the six–team league. The league began play on April 28, 1916 and folded on July 24, 1916. Playing under manager Roy Akin, the Gassers had a record of 32–29 when the league folded, finishing 4.0 games behind the first place Temple Governors.

The 1917 Mexia Gassers folded along with the four–team league during the season. After beginning play on May 21, 1917, the Central Texas League folded on June 6, 1917. At the time the league folded, Mexia was in first place with a record of 8–6, playing under manager Roy Akin. The Gassers finished the shortened season 0.5 games ahead of the second place Ennis Tigers.

Mexia next hosted minor league baseball when the 1922 Mexia Gushers continued minor league play as members of the Texas-Oklahoma League, playing under returning manager Roy Akin.

== The ballpark ==
The Mexia Gassers played home minor league games at Gusher Park. The ballpark was located at East Tyler & South Bonham Street. Today, the site is called Hughes City Park and contains a ballpark and other public amenities.

== Timeline ==
Year(s)	# Yrs.	Team	Level	League	Ballpark
1915–1917	3	Mexia Gassers	Class D	Central Texas League	Gusher Park

== Year–by–year records ==
Year	Record	Finish	Manager	Playoffs/Notes
1915	28–33	5th	Roy Akin	League folded July 24
1916	32–29	3rd	Roy Akin	League folded July 24
1917	8–6	1st	Roy Akin	League folded June 6

== Notable alumni ==
- Clarence Huber (1916)
- Mexia Gassers players
