= Otto McIvor =

American baseball player (1884–1954)

- Outfielder
- Born: July 26, 1884; Greenville, Texas, U.S.
- Died: May 3, 1954 (aged 69); Dallas, Texas, U.S.
- Batted: Both Threw: Left

MLB debut
- April 18, 1911, for the St. Louis Cardinals

Last MLB appearance
- September 28, 1911, for the St. Louis Cardinals

MLB statistics
- Games played: 30
- At bats: 62
- Hits: 14
- Stats at Baseball Reference

Teams
- St. Louis Cardinals (1911)

Edward Otto McIvor (July 26, 1884 – May 3, 1954) was an American outfielder in Major League Baseball for the 1911 St. Louis Cardinals. He was a sixteen-year player in the minor leagues between 1904 and 1920, but only managed to get into 30 games during the 1911 season. McIvor pitched in the minor leagues in 1904, going 3–1. Despite that, he stayed with being an outfielder. He made his major league debut on April 11, 1911 and played his final game September 22 of the same year. During those 30 games, McIvor hit .226/.333/.339 with one home run (an inside the parker hit 7/19/11 off of Bill Schardt) and 9 RBIs in 72 Plate appearances. He later managed in the minor leagues for the 1913 Austin Senators, 1916 Fort Worth Panthers, 1924 Waco Indians, 1924 Austin Rangers and 1925 Terrell Terrors.

== Sources ==
- Career statistics from Baseball Reference · Baseball Reference (Minors) · Retrosheet · Baseball Almanac
