= Middle Texas League =

Texas minor league baseball team

- Classification: Class D (1914–1915)
- Sport: Minor League Baseball
- First season: 1914
- Folded: June 19, 1915
- President: W.F. Blum, Jr. (1914); Hulen P. Robertson (1915)
- No. of teams: 8
- Country: United States of America
- Most titles: 2 Belton Braves

The Middle Texas League was a six–team Class D level minor league baseball league that played in the 1914 and 1915 seasons. The Middle Texas League featured franchises based in Texas. The Middle Texas League permanently folded during the 1915 season. Baseball Hall of Fame member Kid Nichols managed the 1914 Temple Tigers and Hall of Famer Ross Youngs played for the 1915 Bartlett Bearcats.

== History ==
The Middle Texas League began to play in the 1914 season as a new Class D level minor league. The president of the league was W.F. Blum, Jr. The Middle Texas League began play as a six–team league, hosting franchises from Bartlett, Texas (Bartlett Bearcats), Belton, Texas (Belton Braves), Brenham, Texas (Brenham Brewers), Georgetown, Texas (Georgetown Collegians), Lampasas, Texas (Lampasas Resorters) and Temple, Texas (Temple Tigers).

The Middle Texas League began play on May 8, 1914. The league played a spit–season schedule. In 1914, the Temple Tigers won the first–half standings and the Belton Braves won the second–half standings. The final overall standings featured the Bartlett Bearcats (22–59), Belton Braves (37–47), Brenham Brewers (50–34), Georgetown Collegians (50–30), Lampasas Resorters (35–51) and Temple Tigers (54–27). In the Championship playoff, the Belton Braves defeated the Temple Tigers 5 games to 1 to win the championship. Baseball Hall of Fame member Kid Nichols managed the 1914 Temple Tigers.

In its second season, with Hulen P. Robertson becoming the league president, the Middle Texas League began play on April 15, 1915. During the season, the Austin Reps/Representatives (2–5) moved to become the Taylor Producers on May 1, 1915, when floods forced the team to relocate from Austin. Taylor (15–23) then moved to Brenham on June 8, 1915, becoming the second team in Brenham, after the Brenham Brewers folded the day before. Both the Brenham Brewers and Schulenberg Giants disbanded on June 7, 1915. On June 19, 1915, the Middle Texas League permanently folded during the season. The final league standings featured the Austin Representatives/Taylor Producers/Brenham Kaisers (21–36), Bartlett Bearcats (29–26), Belton Braves (40–19), Brenham Brewers (12–31), Schulenburg Giants (23–18) and Temple Governors (32–27). The Belton Braves won both half seasons of the league standings and were league champions.

Baseball Hall of Fame member Ross Youngs played for Bartlett in 1915, hitting .264 in 59 games at age 18.

== Middle Texas League teams ==
Team name(s)	City represented	Ballpark	Year(s) active
Austin Reps; Austin Representatives	Austin, Texas	Riverside Park	1915
Bartlett Bearcats	Bartlett, Texas	Bartlett Base Ball Park	1914 to 1915
Belton Braves	Belton, Texas	Belton Base Ball Park	1914 to 1915
Brenham Brewers (1914-1915); Brenham Kaisers (1915), (2)	Brenham, Texas	Unknown	1914 to 1915
Georgetown Collegians	Georgetown, Texas	Unknown	1914
Lampasas Resorters	Lampasas, Texas	Unknown	1914
Schulenburg Giants	Schulenburg, Texas	Unknown	1915
Taylor Producers	Taylor, Texas	Robinson Park	1915
Temple Tigers (1914); Temple Governors (1915)	Temple, Texas	Unknown	1914 to 1915

== Standings and statistics ==
=== 1914 Middle Texas League ===
Team standings	W	L	PCT	GB	Managers
Temple Tigers	54	27	.667	-	Kid Nichols
Georgetown Collegians	50	30	.625	3½	Jimmy Callahan
Brenham Brewers	50	34	.595	5½	Ike Pendleton
Belton Braves	37	47	.440	18½	Leslie Mitchell / L.B. Hubbard / Bob Hart / Jack Forrester / Cal Calahan
Lampasas Resorters	35	51	.407	21½	Jesse Estill / Luke Roberts
Bartlett Bearcats	22	59	.267	32	Robert Roundtree / Brooks Gordon

Player statistics
Player	Team	Stat	Tot	Player	Team	Stat	Tot
Fred Wende	Georgetown	BA	.380	J. Reems	Brenham	W	14
Ellis Boggess	Temple	Runs	58	Frank Wolfram	Georgetown	Pct	.833; 10-2
Fred Wende	Georgetown	Hits	116				
Ellis Boggess	Temple	HR	16				

=== 1915 Middle Texas League ===
Team Standings	W	L	PCT	GB	Managers
Belton Braves	40	19	.678	-	Charles Lawson
Temple Governors	32	27	.542	8	Luther Burleson / Frank Rogers
Bartlett Bearcats	29	26	.527	9	Ike Pendleton
Austin Reps; Taylor Producers / Brenham Kaisers	21	36	.368	18	Jack Snipes / Billy Disch
Schulenburg Giants	23	18	.561	-	J.M. Robbins
Brenham Brewers	12	21	.279	-	Arthur Wicks / John Tuller

Player statistics
Player	Team	Stat	Tot	Player	Team	Stat	Tot
Russ Breaux	Taylor	BA	.358	Nemo Gaines	Belton	W	13
R. J. Williamson	Belton	Runs	49	Ray Francis	Temple	SO	106
R. J. Williamson	Belton	Hits	79	H. A. Dennis	Belton	Pct	1.000; 11-0
Tom Osborne	Temple	HR	11				

== Baseball Hall of Fame alumni ==
- Kid Nichols, Temple (1914) Inducted, 1949
- Ross Youngs, Bartlett (1915) Inducted, 1972
