= John Vann (baseball) =

American baseball player (1890–1958)

- Catcher
- Born: June 7, 1890; Fairland, Oklahoma, U.S.
- Died: June 10, 1958 (aged 68); Shreveport, Louisiana, U.S.
- Batted: Right Threw: Right

MLB debut
- June 11, 1913, for the St. Louis Cardinals

Last MLB appearance
- June 11, 1913, for the St. Louis Cardinals

MLB statistics
- At-bats: 1
- Batting average: .000
- Stats at Baseball Reference

Teams
- St. Louis Cardinals (1913)

John Silas Vann (June 7, 1890 – June 10, 1958) was an American Major League Baseball catcher. He played with the St. Louis Cardinals for one game as a pinch hitter on June 11, 1913. In his only major league at-bat, he struck out.

Vann started his professional baseball career in 1909. He hit under .250 each year until 1913. That year, besides making it to the majors, he also hit .328 in the Western League. Vann continued to play in the minor leagues until 1926. From 1924 to 1926, he managed the Corsicana Oilers of the Texas Association, winning two pennants.

Vann was Cherokee and was descended from several Cherokee chiefs.
