= Corsicana Oilers =

Minor league baseball team in Texas, US

- 1902–1928; (1902–1905, 1907, 1914–1915, 1917, 1922–1928); Corsicana, Texas

Minor league affiliations
- Class: Class D (1902–1903); Class C (1904–1905); Class D (1907, 1914–1915, 1917, 1922–1928 )
- League: Texas League (1902–1905); North Texas League (1907); Central Texas League (1914–1915, 1917); Texas-Oklahoma League (1922); Texas Association (1923–1926); Lone Star League (1927–1928)

Major league affiliations
- Team: St. Louis Cardinals (1922)

Minor league titles
- League titles (5): 1902; 1904; 1907; 1924; 1925

Team data
- Name: Corsicana Oil Citys (1902–1904); Corsicana Oilers (1905); Corsicana Desperados (1907); Corsicana Athletics (1914–1915, 1917); Corsicana Gumbo Busters (1922); Corsicana Oilers (1923–1928)
- Ballpark: Oil City Park (1902–1905, 1907); Athletic Park (1914–1915, 1917, 1922–1928)

The Corsicana Oilers was the primary nickname of the minor league baseball teams based in Corsicana, Texas. In the seasons between 1902 and 1928, Corsicana teams played as members of the Texas League (1902–1905), North Texas League (1907), Central Texas League (1914–1915, 1917), Texas-Oklahoma League (1922), Texas Association (1923–1926) and Lone Star League (1927–1928), winning five league championships. Corsicana hosted minor league home games at Oil City Park and Athletic Park.

The 1922 Corsicana "Gumbo Busters" played as a minor league affiliate of the St. Louis Cardinals.

The 1902 Corsicana Oil Citys team is ranked in The National Baseball Association's top 100 minor league teams list as one of the top all–time minor league teams.

== History ==
=== 1902 to 1905 Texas League ===
Minor league baseball began in Corsicana in 1902, when the Corsicana "Oil Citys" became members of the Class D level Texas League. In their first season of play, the Oil Citys won the league championship. Corsicana ended the 1902 season with a record of 88–23, placing first in the Texas League, playing the season under manager Mike O'Connor. Corsicana ended the season 29.0 games ahead of the second place Dallas team in the six team league.

On Sunday, June 15, 1902, Corsicana defeated the Texarkana Casketmakers by a score of 51–3 as Oilers player J.J. Clarke reportedly hit 8 home runs in the contest. In winning both halves of the season standings, the Oil Citys' season included a 27–game winning streak. The 1902 Corsicana Oilers team is listed at #51 on The National Baseball Association's top 100 minor league teams of all time.

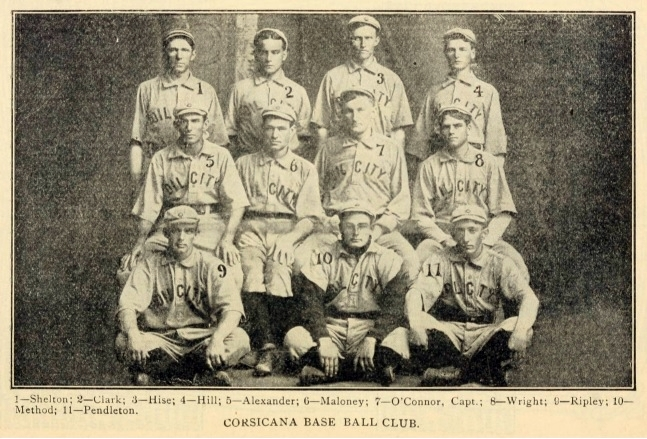
1902 Corsicana Oil Citys. Team photo.

Continuing Texas League play in 1903, the Oil Citys placed second in the six team Texas League final standings. Corsicana had an overall record of 54–54 under manager Mike O'Connor. Corsicana ended the season 7.0 games behind the first place Dallas team.

The 1904 Corsicana Oil City Oil Citys won the Texas League championship, as the league played the season as a four team Class C level league. The Oil Citys ended the 1904 season with a record of 50–51, placing second in the regular season in the Texas League regular season. Curley Maloney and Walter Salm served as managers as the Oil Citys went on to win the 1904 championship. In the extended playoffs, Corsicana defeated the first place Fort Worth Panthers 11 games to 8. Trapper Longley of Corsicana won the Texas League batting championship, hitting .372.

The Corsicana Oilers began the 1905 continuing play in the Texas League, before folding during the season. On June 1, 1905, the Oilers had a record of 10–30 when Corsicana surrendered its franchise and was officially dropped from the league on June 6, 1905. The managers were Walter Salm, Con Lucid and Lou Mahaffey

=== 1907 North Texas League / 1914 to 1917 Central Texas League ===
After a one season hiatus the 1907 Corsicana "Desperados" returned to minor league baseball when play. The Desperados team became members of the 1907 Class D level North Texas League. The Desperados had a 38–21 record and were in first place when the, four–team league folded on June 30, 1907. Dee Poindexter served as manager, as Corsicana finished 2.0 games ahead of the second place Paris Athletics. The league did not return to play in 1908.

In 1914, the Corsicana "Athletics" became charter members of the Central Texas League, which was formed as a six–team Class D level league. The Athletics ended the 1914 Central Texas League regular season with a record of 26–32, placing fifth in the standings under manager Neal Kennedy.

Continuing play in 1915, Corsicana placed second in the Central Texas League standings. The Athletics (or A's for short), ended the 1915 season with a 32–29 record, finishing 3.0 games behind the first place Ennis Tigers. On May 27, 1915, Erwin of Corsicana threw a no-hitter against the Kaufman Kings as the Athletics won 2–0. On June 19, 1915, Corsicana pitcher Joe Page threw the second no-hitter of the season against the Ennis Tigers in a 2–1 victory. Roy Morton was the 1915 manager. The Corsicana franchise folded after the 1915 season.

The Corsicana Athletics briefly returned to play in the 1917 the Central Texas League. With a 4–4 record, the Temple Governors franchise moved to Corsicana June 1, 1917. Shortly after, the team had an overall record of 6–8 under manager Paul Trammel when the Central Texas League permanently folded on June 6, 1917.

=== 1922 to 1928 Texas-Oklahoma League / Texas Association ===
The 1922 Corsicana Gumbo "Busters" returned the city to minor league play and were an affiliate of the St. Louis Cardinals. Playing as members of the Class D level Texas-Oklahoma League, the Gumbo Busters finished the 1922 regular season with a 56–46 record, placing third in the league standings, 13.0 games behind the Paris Snappers in the final league standings. Chuck Miller and Harvey Grubb served as managers.

The Corsicana "Oilers" moniker in 1923 returned as the franchise joined the Class D level Texas Association. The Oilers finished 1923 with a record of 68–70, placing fourth in the six–team Texas Association, 11.0 games behind the first place Mexia Gushers under manager Harvey Grubb.

The 1924 Corsicana Oilers won the Texas Association Championship. The Oilers ended the 1924 season with a record of 83–42, placing first in the Texas Association standings under manager John Vann. The Oilers were 11.5 games ahead of the second place Marlin Bathers in the six–team standings.

The Corsicana Oilers won a second consecutive Texas Association Championship in 1925. Playing under returning manager John Vann, the Oilers ended the 1925 season with a record of 85–48, placing first in the Texas Association standings, and finishing 9.0 games ahead of the second place Mexia Gushers.

The 1926 Corsicana Oilers finished last in the Texas Association. With a record of 53–72, Corsicana placed sixth in the Texas Association under manager John Vann. The Oilers were 21.5 games behind the first place Austin Senators. The Texas Association folded after the 1926 season.

In 1927, the Corsicana Oilers became charter members of the Lone Star League, which formed as an eight–team Class D level league. The Oilers ended the 1927 season with a record of 48–72, placing sixth in the final standings under managers Les Nunamaker and Ben Brownlow. Corsicana finished 21.0 games behind the first place Palestine Pals.

In their final season of play, the 1928 Corsicana Oilers placed fifth in the Lone Star League. Corsicana ended their final season with a record of 55–68 under manager Ray Falk. The Corsicana franchise permanently folded after the 1928 season.

Corsicana has not hosted another minor league baseball team.

== The ballparks ==
Corsicana teams were noted to have played home games at Oil City Park in the seasons from 1902 to 1907.

Beginning in 1914, Corsicana teams played at Athletic Park. The ballpark was located between South Seaton & South 9th Streets and between East 10th Avenue & East 11th Avenue.

== Timeline ==
Year(s)	# Yrs.	Team	Level	League	Affiliate	Ballpark
1902–1903	2	Corsicana Oil Citys	Class D	Texas League	None	Oil City Park
1904	1	Corsicana Oil Citys	Class C	Texas League	None	Oil City Park
1905	1	Corsicana Oilers	Class C	Texas League	None	Oil City Park
1907	1	Corsicana Desperados	Class D	North Texas League	None	Oil City Park
1914–1915, 1917	3	Corsicana Athletics	Class D	Central Texas League	None	Athletic Park
1922	1	Corsicana Gumbo Busters	Class D	Texas-Oklahoma League	St. Louis Cardinals	Athletic Park
1923–1926	4	Corsicana Oilers	Class D	Texas Association	None	Athletic Park
1927–1928	2	Corsicana Oilers	Class D	Lone Star League	None	Athletic Park

== Year–by–year records ==
Year	Record	Finish	Manager	Playoffs/Notes
1902	87–23	1st	Mike O'Connor	League champions
1903	54–53	2nd	Mike O'Connor	No playoffs held
1904	48–53	3rd	Doak Roberts/ James Maloney / Walter Salm	League champions
1905	10–30	NA	Con Lucid / Jim Mahaffey	Team Folded June 1
1907	38–21	1st	Dee Poindexter	League folded June 30 League champions
1914	26–32	5th	Gus Kennedy	No playoffs held
1915	32–29	2nd	Roy Morton	No playoffs held
1917	6–8	3rd	Paul Trammel	League Folded June 6
1922	56–46	3rd	Chuck Miller / Harvey Grubb	No playoffs held
1923	68–70	4th	Harvey Grubb	No playoffs held
1924	83–42	1st	John Vann	League champions
1925	85–48	1st	John Vann	League champions
1926	53–72	6th	John Vann	No playoffs held
1927	48–72	6th	Les Nunamaker / Bennie Brownlow	No playoffs held
1928	55–68	5th	Ira Bidwell	No playoffs held

== No-hitters ==
Date	Pitcher	Score	Opponent
May 27, 1915	Joe Erwin	2–0	Kaufman Kings
June 19, 1915	Joe Page	2–1	Ennis Tigers

== Notable alumni ==
- Walter Blair (1903)
- Neal Baker (1928)
- Bruno Block (1905)
- Jim Brown (1924)
- Nig Clarke (1902)
- Tex Covington (1907)
- Wally Dashiell (1926)
- George Edmondson (1922)
- Tim Griesenbeck (1926)
- Harvey Grubb (1922–1925; 1923, MGR)
- Hunter Hill (1902–1903)
- Jimmie Humphries (1907)
- Cobe Jones (1926)
- Jack Knott (1926–1927)
- Tom Lovelace (1924–1927)
- Con Lucid (1903, 1905, MGR)
- Tex McDonald (1927)
- Slim McGrew (1926)
- Otto McIvor (1905)
- Chuck Miller (1922, MGR)
- Walter Morris (1902)
- Les Nunamaker (1927, MGR)
- Tony Piet (1928)
- Bill Shores (1926)
- Oscar Siemer (1923)
- John Vann (1924–1926, MGR)
- Hippo Vaughn (1907) ERA Title
- Lucky Wright (1902)
- Corsicana Oilers players
  Corsicana Oil Citys players
