= Walt Alexander =

American baseball player

- Catcher
- Born: March 5, 1891; Atlanta, Georgia, U.S.
- Died: December 29, 1978 (aged 87); Fort Worth, Texas, U.S.
- Batted: Right Threw: Right

MLB debut
- June 21, 1912, for the St. Louis Browns

Last MLB appearance
- September 8, 1917, for the New York Yankees

MLB statistics
- Batting average: .188
- Home runs: 1
- Runs batted in: 24
- Stats at Baseball Reference

Teams
- St. Louis Browns (1912–1913, 1915); New York Yankees (1915–1917)

Walter Ernest Alexander (March 5, 1891 – December 29, 1978) was an American former Major League Baseball player. He batted and threw right-handed, and weight 165 pounds. He was a catcher for the St. Louis Browns and the New York Yankees. In 162 career games with the Browns and Yankees, Alexander had 76 hits in 405 at bats (.188 average). He had 1 home run and 24 RBIs. He started managing teams in 1923, he took time off from managing in 1926 and 1927, he resumed managing in 1928.
