= Joe Munson =

American baseball player (1899–1991)

- Munson, circa 1930
- Outfielder
- Born: Joseph Martin Napoleon Carlson; November 6, 1899; Renovo, Pennsylvania, U.S.
- Died: February 24, 1991 (aged 91); Drexel Hill, Pennsylvania, U.S.
- Batted: Left Threw: Right

MLB debut
- September 18, 1925, for the Chicago Cubs

Last MLB appearance
- June 4, 1926, for the Chicago Cubs

MLB statistics
- Batting average: .287
- Home runs: 3
- Runs batted in: 18
- Stats at Baseball Reference

Teams
- Chicago Cubs (1925–1926)

Joseph Martin Napoleon Munson (November 6, 1899 – February 24, 1991; born Joseph Martin Napoleon Carlson) was an American professional baseball outfielder who played for the Chicago Cubs of Major League Baseball (MLB) in 1925 and 1926. Listed at 5 feet 9 inches (1.75 m) and 184 pounds (83 kg), he batted left-handed and threw right-handed.

== Biography ==
Munson attended Lehigh University, where he played college baseball. He then played in the minor leagues from 1918 through 1932, initially playing under the name "Joe Martin". With the Harrisburg Senators in 1925, he won the Eastern League triple crown, leading the league with a .400 batting average, 33 home runs and 129 RBIs, while also recording 188 hits, 132 runs scored, and 17 triples. For the Tulsa Oilers in the Western League, he batted .383 in 1927, won the batting title with .385 in 1928, and then hit .369 in 1929. After the 1932 season, he retired with a .335 minor league lifetime average and 2,050 hits.

Munson played in a total of 42 major league games, all with the Chicago Cubs. In 1925, he played in nine games, batting .371 (13-for-35) with three RBIs. In 1926, he played in 33 games, batting .257 (26-for-101) with three home runs and 15 RBIs. Overall in MLB, Munson was a .287 hitter (39-for-136) with three home runs and 18 RBIs. Defensively, he played 21 games in right field and 16 games in left field, with a .922 fielding average.

Munson was born in Renovo, Pennsylvania. A 1925 newspaper article noted that he was studying art in St. Louis during the baseball offseason. On his draft registration card of February 1942, he listed his employer as the Union Tank Car Company in Philadelphia. He died at the age of 91 in Drexel Hill, Pennsylvania, and was buried under his birth name.
