= Bartlett, Texas =

- City
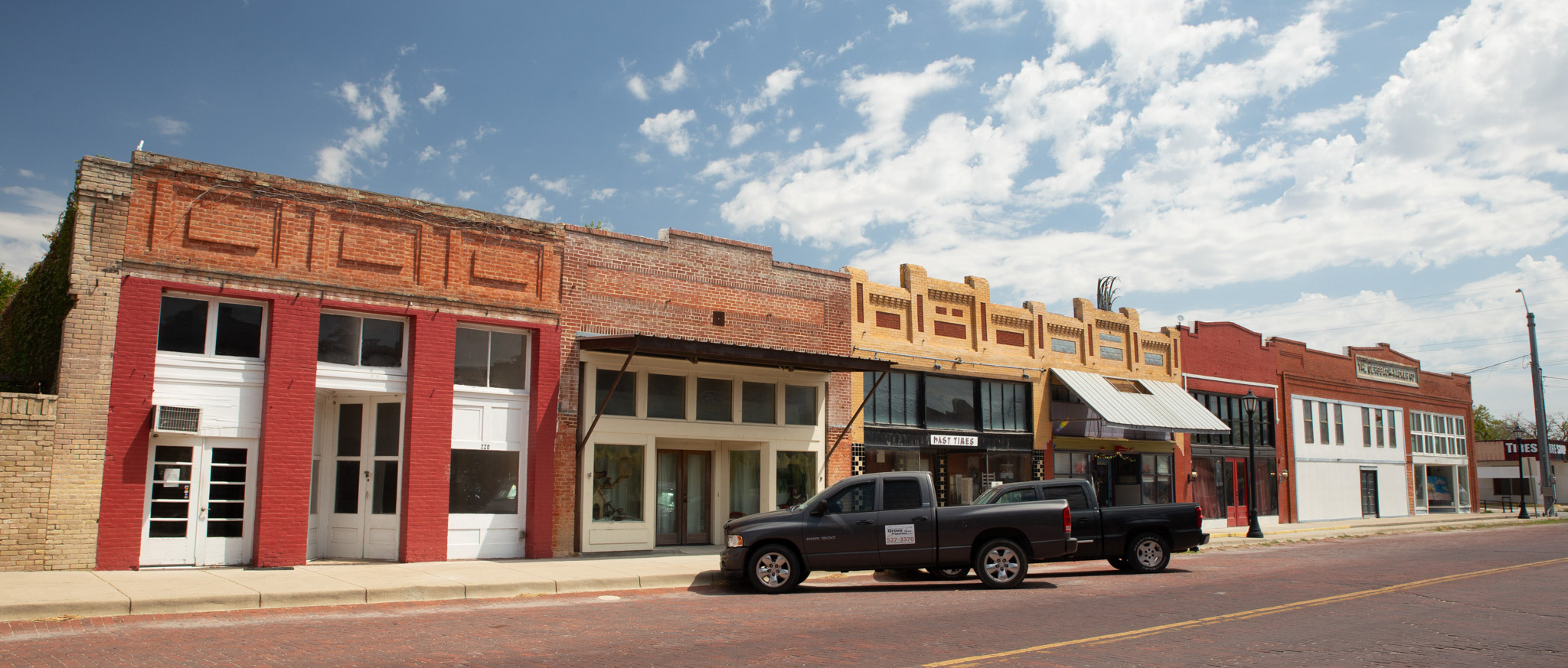
- Bartlett Commercial Historic District
- Interactive map of Bartlett, Texas
- Location within Texas Location within the United States Location within North America
- Coordinates: 30°47′43″N 97°25′57″W
- Country: United States
- State: Texas
- Counties: Williamson, Bell

Area
  - Total: 1.24 sq mi (3.21 km^{2})
  - Land: 1.24 sq mi (3.20 km^{2})
  - Water: 0.0039 sq mi (0.01 km^{2})
- Elevation: 600 ft (180 m)

Population (2020)
  - Total: 1,633
  - Density: 1,420.7/sq mi (548.52/km^{2})
- Time zone: UTC-6 (Central (CST))
  - Summer (DST): UTC-5 (CDT)
- ZIP code: 76511
- Area code: 254
- FIPS code: 48-05732
- GNIS feature ID: 2409793
- Website: www.bartlett-tx.us

Bartlett is a city in Bell and Williamson counties in the U.S. state of Texas. The population was 1,633 at the 2020 census.

Bartlett lies in two counties as well as two metropolitan areas. The Bell County portion of the city is part of the Killeen–Temple–Fort Hood Metropolitan Statistical Area, while the Williamson County portion is part of the Austin–Round Rock Metropolitan Statistical Area. Known for its late nineteenth and early twentieth century architecture, Bartlett was the site for the filming of movies including The Stars Fell on Henrietta and The Newton Boys, as well as the NBC television drama Revolution.

== History ==
Starting in 1909, Bartlett was the headquarters of the Bartlett-Florence Railway, later the Bartlett Western Railroad, which ran from Bartlett's connection with the Missouri-Kansas-Texas Railroad to the cotton processing center of Florence, Texas. However, that line was abandoned in 1935.

In 1914 and 1915, Bartlett was home to minor league baseball. The Bartlett Bearcats played as members of the Class D level Middle Texas League for two seasons. Baseball Hall of Fame member Ross Youngs played for Bartlett in 1915.

== Geography ==
Bartlett is located 24 miles (39 km) south of Temple and 50 miles (80 km) northeast of downtown Austin. The city straddles the line between Bell and Williamson counties; the center of the city is mostly in Bell County, but the slight majority of the city's area is in Williamson County.

According to the United States Census Bureau, the city has a total area of 1.2 square miles (3.2 km^{2}), of which 0.004 square miles (0.01 km^{2}), or 0.24%, is water.

=== Climate ===
The climate in this area is characterized by hot, humid summers and generally mild to cool winters. According to the Köppen Climate Classification system, Bartlett has a humid subtropical climate, abbreviated "Cfa" on climate maps.

== Demographics ==
Historical population
Census	Pop.	Note	%±
1890	206		—
1900	957		364.6%
1910	1,815		89.7%
1920	1,731		−4.6%
1930	1,873		8.2%
1940	1,668		−10.9%
1950	1,727		3.5%
1960	1,540		−10.8%
1970	1,622		5.3%
1980	1,567		−3.4%
1990	1,439		−8.2%
2000	1,675		16.4%
2010	1,623		−3.1%
2020	1,633		0.6%
U.S. Decennial Census

=== 2020 census ===
As of the 2020 census, Bartlett had a population of 1,633 and 303 families residing in the city. The median age was 40.4 years. 23.7% of residents were under the age of 18 and 19.1% of residents were 65 years of age or older. For every 100 females there were 99.1 males, and for every 100 females age 18 and over there were 91.1 males age 18 and over.

0% of residents lived in urban areas, while 100.0% lived in rural areas.

There were 555 households in Bartlett, of which 39.3% had children under the age of 18 living in them. Of all households, 47.9% were married-couple households, 19.1% were households with a male householder and no spouse or partner present, and 26.8% were households with a female householder and no spouse or partner present. About 20.1% of all households were made up of individuals and 10.3% had someone living alone who was 65 years of age or older.

There were 636 housing units, of which 12.7% were vacant. Among occupied housing units, 72.6% were owner-occupied and 27.4% were renter-occupied. The homeowner vacancy rate was 1.7% and the rental vacancy rate was 4.2%.

Bartlett racial composition as of 2020 (NH = Non-Hispanic) (Note: Note: the US Census treats Hispanic/Latino as an ethnic category. This table excludes Latinos from the racial categories and assigns them to a separate category. Hispanics/Latinos can be of any race.)
Race	Number	Percentage
White (NH)	584	35.76%
Black or African American (NH)	154	9.43%
Native American or Alaska Native (NH)	3	0.18%
Asian (NH)	9	0.55%
Mixed/Multi-Racial (NH)	44	2.69%
Hispanic or Latino	839	51.38%
Total	1633	

Racial composition as of the 2020 census
Race	Percent
White	44.2%
Black or African American	10.3%
American Indian and Alaska Native	0.5%
Asian	0.6%
Native Hawaiian and Other Pacific Islander	0.1%
Some other race	20.9%
Two or more races	23.5%
Hispanic or Latino (of any race)	51.4%

=== 2000 census ===
At the 2000 census, there were 1,675 people, 571 households and 404 families residing in the city. The population density was 1,373.3 inhabitants per square mile (530.2/km^{2}). There were 638 housing units at an average density of 523.1 per square mile (202.0/km^{2}). The racial makeup of the city was 61.61% White, 17.97% African American, 0.66% Native American, 0.06% Asian, 16.84% from other races, and 2.87% from two or more races. Hispanic or Latino of any race were 33.07% of the population.

There were 571 households, of which 35.0% had children under the age of 18 living with them, 52.0% were married couples living together, 14.5% had a female householder with no husband present, and 29.1% were non-families. 27.3% of all households were made up of individuals, and 16.5% had someone living alone who was 65 years of age or older. The average household size was 2.78 and the average family size was 3.40.

Age distribution was 29.3% under the age of 18, 8.8% from 18 to 24, 23.0% from 25 to 44, 19.9% from 45 to 64, and 18.9% who were 65 years of age or older. The median age was 36 years. For every 100 females, there were 91.2 males. For every 100 females age 18 and over, there were 83.9 males.

The median household income was $26,094, and the median family income was $35,595. Males had a median income of $22,273 versus $21,016 for females. The per capita income for the city was $12,649. About 21.1% of families and 25.6% of the population were below the poverty line, including 29.5% of those under age 18 and 30.3% of those age 65 or over.

== Education ==
Bartlett is served by the Bartlett Independent School District and is home to the Bartlett High School Bulldogs and Lassies.

== Notable people ==
- Henry Ray Clark (1936–2006), artist
- Louise Holland Coe, first woman elected to the New Mexico Senate, first woman to run for U.S. Congress, 1894–1985
- John C. Holland, Los Angeles City Council member, 1943–1967
