= Terrell Terrors =

The Terrell Terrors were a Minor League Baseball team based in Terrell, Texas. The team played as members of the Class D level Central Texas League in 1915 and 1916, first playing as the Terrell Cubs in 1915. The Terrell Terrors become members of the Texas Association in 1925 and 1926.

== MLB alumni ==
- Mack Allison (1925)
- Ed Appleton (1925)
- Virgil Cheeves (1926)
- Roy Johnson (1916)
- Otto McIvor (1925)
- Larry Pratt (1916)
- Leo Tankersley (1926)
- Johnny Vergez (1926)
