= Austin Senators =

- 1888–1964; (1888–1890, 1896–1899, 1905–1908, 1911–1915, 1923–1926, 1947–1955, 1956–1964); Austin, Texas

Minor league affiliations
- Previous classes: Class AA (1956–1964); Class B (1895, 1911–1914, 1947–1955); Class C (1896–1899); Class D (1915, 1923–1926)
- Previous leagues: Texas League (1888–1890); Texas-Southern League (1895); Texas Association (1896); Texas League (1897-1899, 1905); South Texas League (1906); Texas League (1907–1908, 1911–1914); Middle Texas League (1915); Texas Association (1923–1926); Big State League (1947–1955); Texas League (1956–1964)

Major league affiliations
- Previous teams: Milwaukee Braves (1956–1964)

Minor league titles
- League titles: 1906, 1907, 1911, 1959
- Second-half titles: 1906

Team data
- Previous names: Austin Senators (1888–1890, 1895-99, 1905–1908, 1911–1914); Austin Representatives (1915); Austin Rangers (1925–1926); Austin Pioneers (1947–1955); Austin Senators (1956–1964); Austin Braves (1965-1967)
- Previous parks: Riverside Park (Austin)

The "Austin Senators" is the name of various minor league baseball teams based in Austin, Texas, United States which played on-and-off between 1898 and 1964. Different incarnations of the Senators have played as members of the Texas League (1888–1890, 1905, 1907–1908, 1911–1914, 1956–1967), Texas-Southern League (1896), South Texas League (1906) Middle Texas League (1915) and Texas Association (1925–1926).

== History ==
In 1915, the Senators moved to the Middle Texas League and won two games as the Austin Representatives before relocating to Taylor, Texas due to severe flooding. They were known as the Austin Rangers playing in the Texas Association from 1925 to 1926. From 1956 to 1967 they were affiliated with the Milwaukee/Atlanta Braves. For the final three seasons of their existence, they were known as the "Austin Braves." After the 1967 season, the team relocated to Shreveport, Louisiana, depriving Austin of professional baseball for the rest of the 20th century.

Over the course of their existence, they won multiple league championships. Their first came in 1906 under manager Warren Gill. They won their next in 1907 under Brooks Gordon; during the same year, the Senators would post one of the most lopsided victories in baseball history, by defeating the San Antonio Bronchos in the second game of a doubleheader 44–0. During this game, Senators player Harry Short scored seven runs on five hits, stole four bases and hit a double and a triple.

In 1911, the Senators won their third championship under manager Dale Gear. They won their final league championship in 1959 under the guidance of Ernie White. In that season, Charlie Gorin threw a no-hitter against the Mexico City Diablos Rojos. On the 50th anniversary of their championship season, members of the 1959 team reunited in Central Texas where they were honored during a Round Rock Express series and given championship rings.

== Timeline ==
Year(s)	# Yrs.	Team	Level	League	Affiliate
1888–1890	3	Austin Senators	Class C	Texas League	None
1895	1	Austin Beavers	Independent	Texas-Southern League	None
1896	1	Austin Senators	Independent	Texas-Southern League	None
1897–1899, 1905	4	Austin Senators	Class C	Texas League	None
1906	1	Austin Senators	Class D	South Texas League	None
1907–1908, 1911–1914	6	Austin Senators	Class C	Texas League	None
1915	1	Austin Reps	Class D	Middle Texas League	None
1923–1924	2	Austin Rangers	Class D	Texas Association	None
1925–1926	2	Austin Senators	Class D	Texas Association	None
1947–1955	9	Austin Pioneers	Class B	Big State League	None
1956-1964	9	Austin Senators	Class AA	Texas League	Milwaukee Braves
1965–1967	3	Austin Braves	Class AA	Texas League	Atlanta Braves

== See also ==
- Riverside Park (Austin)
