= Temple Eagles =

- 1949–1954; Temple, Texas

Minor league affiliations
- Class: Class B (1949–1954)
- League: Big State League (1949–1954)

Minor league titles
- League titles (0): None
- Conference titles (1): 1952
- Wild card berths (2): 1950; 1951

Team data
- Name: Temple Eagles (1949–1954)
- Ballpark: American Legion Park (1949–1954)

The Temple Eagles were a minor league baseball team based in Temple, Texas. From 1949 to 1954, the Eagles played exclusively as members of the Class B level Big State League, winning the 1952 league pennant and qualifying for the playoffs in three seasons. Temple hosted home minor league games at the American Legion Park

== History ==
Minor league baseball began in Temple, Texas with the 1905 Temple Boll Weevils, who played as members of the Class C level Texas League. Several other minor league teams later played in Temple, preceding the Temple Eagles, including the "Temple Tigers" and "Temple Governors", who played as members of the Class D level Middle Texas League in 1914 and 1915, the Temple Governors who continued play in the Central Texas League in 1916 and 1917 and the "Temple Surgeons" who played in the Texas Association between 1924 and 1926.

In 1949, minor league baseball returned, as Temple "Eagles" franchise was formed and joined the Class B level Big State League. The Eagled joined with the Austin Pioneers, Gainesville Owls, Greenville Majors, Sherman–Denison Twins, Texarkana Bears, Waco Pirates and Wichita Falls Spudders as fellow league members.

In their first season of play in the eight–team Big State League, the 1949 Temple Eagles finished the season in last place. Temple ended the regular season with a 58–89 record, placing eighth. Amputee and former All–Star major league pitcher Monty Stratton pitched briefly for Temple in 1949. Stratton pitched for Temple in the same year that the motion picture The Stratton Story was released nationwide in theaters, starring Jimmy Stewart as Stratton. With a prosthetic leg, Stratton pitched 4 innings in one game for Temple in 1949, taking the loss in the game after giving up 4 unearned runs.

Continuing play in the 1950 Big State League, the Temple Eagles finished the season with a 74–70 record to place fourth, drawing 105,081 fans in attendance. In 1951, the Eagles had a record of 88–60 to place second, finishing 1.0 games behind the 1st place Gainesville Owls. Temple had home season attendance of 112,022 in 1951.

The 1952 Temple Eagles finished with a 85–62 record and won the Big State League pennant, finishing 1.0 game ahead of the Tyler East Texans and drawing 101,906 fans for the season. In the playoffs, Temple was defeated 4 games to 1 by the Austin Pioneers. Temple followed with a 72–73 record in 1953 to place 5th in 1953. Temple's 1954 season resulted in a last place finish, as the Eagles ended the season in eighth place with a record of 44–102 and finished 60.5 games behind the 1st place Waco Pirates, playing the season under managers Fred Campbell, Bob Moyer and Fred Martin.

The Temple Eagles franchise folded after the 1954 season in which they had season attendance of 31,673. The Big State League continued play in 1955 with the Port Arthur Seahawks franchise replacing Temple in league play. Temple has not hosted another minor league team.

== The ballparks ==
Early Temple teams hosted minor league home games at Woodson Field. Today, the site is still in use as a football and soccer facility for Temple High School. Woodson Field is located at 670 West Elm, Temple, Texas.

The Temple Eagles played their minor league home games at American Legion Park in Temple, Texas.

== Year–by–year records ==
Year	Record	Finish	Manager	Playoffs/Notes
1949	58-89	8th	Barney White (20–40) / Homer Peel (38–49)	Did not qualify
1950	74–70	4th	Lou Finney	Lost in 1st round
1951	88–60	2nd	Bill Herring (47–37) / Jack Bradsher (41–23)	Lost in 1st round
1952	85–62	1st	Salty Parker	Won league pennant Lost in 1st round
1953	72–73	5th	Salty Parker (36–40) / Lon Goldstein (36–33)	Did not qualify
1954	44–102	8th	Fred Martin (14–38) / Fred Campbell(15–26); Robert Moyer (15–38)	Did not qualify

== Notable alumni ==
The following Temple alumni played major league baseball:

- John Bottarini (1949)
- Lou Finney (1950, MGR)
- Lon Goldstein (1951–1952; 1953, MGR)
- Fred Martin (1954, MGR)
- Salty Parker (1952–1953, MGR)
- Homer Peel (1949, MGR)
- Earl Reid (1950)
- Hal Schacker (1950)
- Tom Simpson (1949)
- Monty Stratton (1949) Subject of The Stratton Story
- Bill Tremel (1951)
- Tommy Warren (1953)
- Barney White (1949, MGR), (1950-1951)

== See also ==
- Temple Eagles players
