= Galveston, Texas minor league baseball history =

- 1950–1955; (1888–1890, 1892, 1897–1899, 1907–1917, 1919–1924, 1931–1937 1950–1955); Galveston, Texas

Minor league affiliations
- Class: Class B (1888–1890, 1892, 1897–1899, 1907–1917, 1919–1920); Class A (1921–1924, 1931–1937); Class C (1950); Class B (1951–1955)
- League: Texas League (1888–1890, 1892, 1897–1899, 1907–1917, 1919–1924, 1931–1937); Gulf Coast League (1950–1953); Big State League (1954–1955)

Major league affiliations
- Team: None

Minor league titles
- League titles (4): 1890; 1899; 1904; 1934
- Conference titles (1): 1953
- Wild card berths (2): 1950; 1952

Team data
- Name: Galveston Giants (1888); Galveston Sand Crabs (1889–1890, 1892, 1897–1899, 1907–1911); Galveston Pirates (1912–1917, 1919–1921); Galveston Sand Crabs (1922-1924); Galveston Buccaneers (1931–1937); Galveston White Caps (1950–1955)
- Ballpark: Beach Park (1884-1904); Sportsman’s Park (1905-1911); Beach Park (1912-1914); Gulf View Park/Pirate Field (1914–1921); Moody Stadium (1931–1943); White Cap Park (1950–1955)

Minor league baseball teams were based in Galveston, Texas in various seasons between 1888 and 1955. The Galveston White Caps played as members of the Gulf Coast League from 1950 to 1953 and Big State League from 1954 to 1955. Earlier Galveston teams played ender various monikers in the Texas League between 1888 and 1937. Galveston teams won four league championships.

== History ==
Early Galveston teams called the Galveston Sand Crabs evolved from the 1888 Galveston Giants of the Texas League. The Sand Crabs continued play in the Texas League from 1889 to 1890, 1892, 1897–1899 and 1907–1911.

The Galveston Pirates (1912–1917, 1919–1921), Galveston Sand Crabs (1922–1924) and Galveston Buccaneers (1931–1937) played as members of the Texas League.

The Galveston Buccaneers first began play in 1931, when the Waco Cubs relocated to Galveston. Galveston owner Shearn Moody had purchased the Waco franchise, moved the team to Galveston and constructed Moody Stadium. The Buccaneers won the Texas League championship in 1934. The franchise moved to become the Shreveport Sports after the 1937 season when Shearn Moody died and the franchise was sold.

The Galveston White Caps were founding members of the Class B level Gulf Coast League in 1950 before joining the Big State League in 1954, before disbanding in 1955.

The Gulf Coast League folded after the season 1953 season, with members Galveston White Caps, Harlingen Capitals, Laredo Apaches, Brownsville Charros, Port Arthur Seahawks, Corpus Christi Aces, Lake Charles Lakers and Texas City Texans. Galveston won the league's final regular season title with a record of 94–48.

In the Gulf Coast League, Galveston finished 80–68 in 1950, 71–83 in 1951, 80–74 in 1952 and 94–48 in 1953.

In 1954, the Galveston White Caps joined the Big State League. Galveston played alongside the Austin Pioneers, Corpus Christi Clippers, Del Rio Indians, Harlingen Capitals, Temple Eagles, Tyler Tigers, Port Arthur Sea Hawks and Waco Pirates as fellow league members. The White Caps franchise folded on June 12, 1955, with a record of 28–30.

Joining the Big State League, the White Caps finished 73–73 in 1954 and were 28–30 when the franchise folded on June 12, 1955.

Galveston, Texas has not hosted another minor league team.

Today, the Galveston "White Caps" moniker is used by the athletic teams at Galveston College.

== The ballparks ==
Galveston minor league teams reportedly played minor league games at Beach Park (1884-1904), Sportsman’s Park (1905-1911), Beach Park (1912-1914), Gulf View Park/Pirate Field (1914–1921), Moody Stadium (1931-1943) and White Cap Park (1950-1955).

Beach Park was located at the corner of Avenue Q and & 23rd Street, Galveston, Texas. The 500 capacity stadium was located across the street from the Beach Hotel. In 1895 the bleachers collapsed during a game.

Gulfview Park / Pirate Field was located at 2802 Avenue R, Galveston, Texas. The ballpark had a capacity of 4,000. It had dimensions of 260 RF and was called Pirate Field when hosting the Pirates. The ballpark was damaged by a tropical storm on August 15, 1915, and the park was unusable for the remainder of the 1915 season.

Beginning in 1931, Galveston minor league teams were noted to have played home games at Moody Stadium. Moody Stadium was one of the first minor league stadiums equipped with lights. Moody Stadium was located ad 5108 Avenue G Galveston, Texas. Moody Stadium had a capacity of 8,000 in 1937 and dimensions of (left, center, right): 338–460–324.

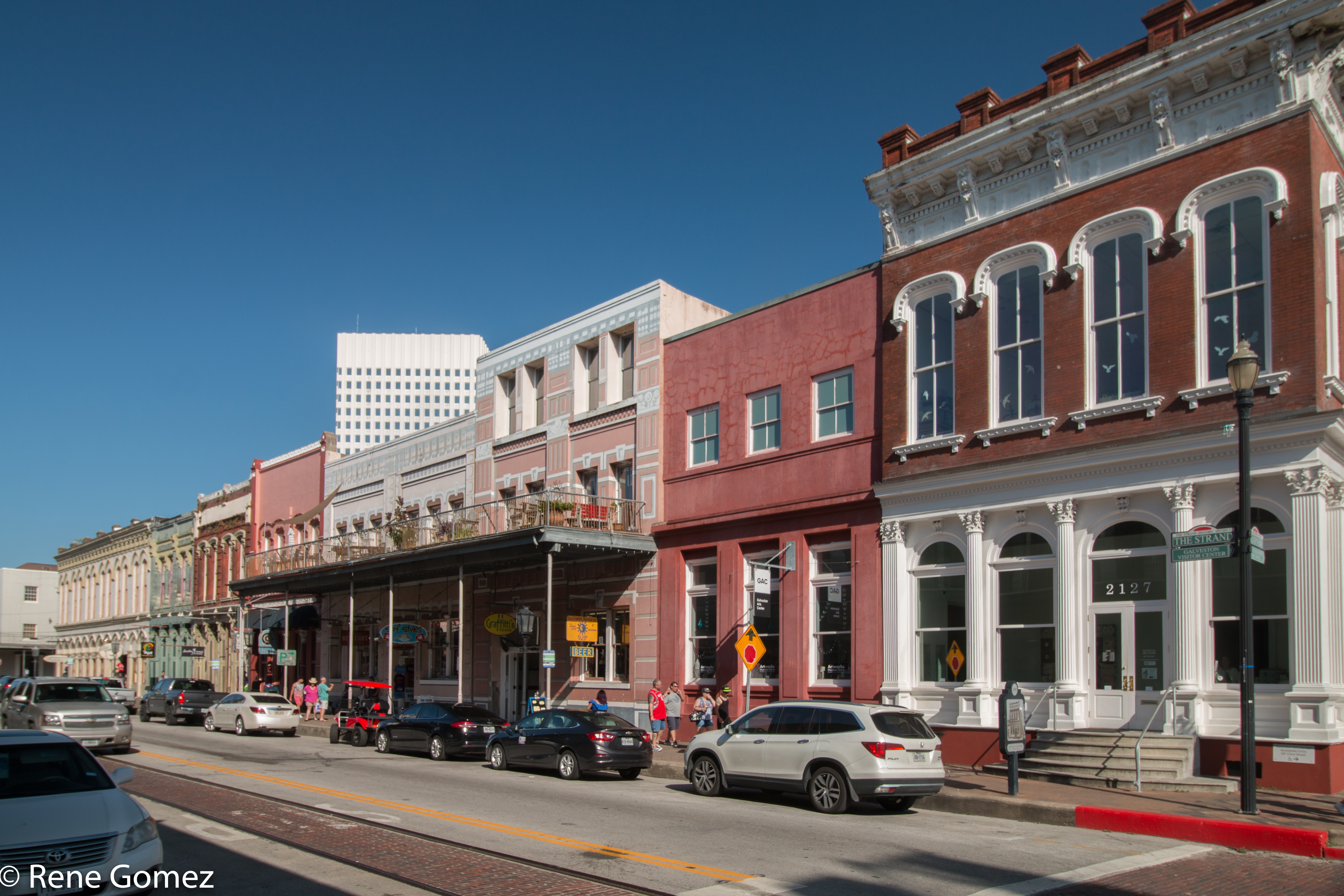
(2017) The Strand. National Register of Historic Places. Galveston, Texas

== Year–by–year records ==
1950	80–68	2nd	Ben Phillips	Lost in 1st round
1951	71–83	5th	Harry Gumbert	Did not qualify
1952	80–74	4th	Stan Goletz / Harry Gumbert	Lost in 1st round
1953	94–48	1st	Barney White	Lost League Finals
1954	73–73	5th	Chase Riddle / Henry Robinson	Did not qualify
1955	28–30	--	Jodie Beeler	Team disbanded June 12

== Notable alumni ==
- Jodie Beeler (1955, MGR)
- Beau Bell (1931–1932) MLB All-Star
- Harry Brecheen (1935–1936) 2x MLB All-Star; St. Louis Cardinals Hall of Fame
- Max Butcher (1935)
- Jiggs Donahue (1911, MGR)
- Vallie Eaves (1954)
- Stan Goletz (1952–1953)
- Julio Gonzalez (1951)
- Harry Gumbert (1951, MGR)
- Harvey Hendrick (1922)
- Ira Hutchinson (1933–1934)
- Hank Izquierdo (1951–1953)
- Rene Monteagudo (1951)
- Wally Moses (1933–1934) 2x MLB All-Star; Philadelphia Baseball Wall of Fame
- Del Pratt (1931–1932, MGR)
- Chase Riddle (1954, MGR)
- Hank Severeid (1937)
- Tully Sparks (1897)
- Harry Steinfeldt (1896)
- Jake Stenzel (1890)
- Monty Stratton (1934) MLB All-Star; Movie: The Stratton Story
- Jeff Tesreau (1908) MLB ERA Title
- Gus Weyhing (1910)
- Barney White (1951–1952), (1953, MGR)
- Galveston White Caps players

== Media ==
The Galveston Buccaneers were the subject of a 2015 book, "The Galveston Buccaneers" by Kris Rutherford, Arcadia Publishing. ISBN 1626198373
