= Texas City Texans =

- 1951–1977; (1951-1956, 1977); Texas City, Texas

Minor league affiliations
- Class: Class B (1951–1953); Class C (1954); Class B (1955–1956); Class C (1956); Class A (1977)
- League: Gulf Coast League (1951–1953); Evangeline League (1954); Big State League (1955–1956); Lone Star League (1977)

Major league affiliations
- Team: St. Louis Cardinals (1956); Baltimore Orioles (1956)

Minor league titles
- League titles (1): 1953
- Conference titles (1): 1977

Team data
- Name: Texas City Texans (1951–1953); Texas City Pilots (1954); Texas City Texans (1955); Texas City Exporters (1956); Texas City Stars (1977)
- Ballpark: Texan Park (1951–1956, 1977)

The Texas City Texans were a minor league baseball team based in Texas City, Texas. Between 1951 and 1977, Texas City teams played as members of the Gulf Coast League from 1951 to 1953, Evangeline League in 1954, Big State League in 1955 and 1956 and the Lone Star League in 1977. Texas City won the 1953 league championship and hosted all minor league home games at Texan Park.

Texas City was a minor league affiliate of both the Baltimore Orioles and St. Louis Cardinals in 1956.

== History ==
Beginning minor league play in 1951, the Texas City Texans played as members of the Class B level Gulf Coast League from 1951 to 1953 and Big State League from 1955 to 1956. After a two-decade hiatus, Texas City hosted the Class A level Texas City Stars, who played as a member of the Lone Star League in 1977.

In 1951, Texas City shared the franchise with neighboring La Marque, Texas, playing as a charter member of the Gulf Coast League.

The Gulf Coast League folded after the season 1953 season, with members Galveston White Caps, Harlingen Capitals, Laredo Apaches, Brownsville Charros, Port Arthur Seahawks, Corpus Christi Aces and Lake Charles Lakers.

Texas City finished with records 70–84, 64–90 and 87–57, playing in the Gulf Coast League from 1951 to 1953. The Texas City teams finished with records of 71–67 and 59–81, playing as members of the Big States League in 1955 and 1956. The Texas City Texans captured the final Gulf Coast League Championship in 1953.

In 1954, the Texas City Pilots joined the Evangeline League. However, the franchise moved to Thibodaux, Louisiana on June 17, 1954, becoming the Thibodaux Pilots and ending the season with a record of 51–79.

The Texas City Texans were reformed and joined the Big State League in 1955. Texas City played alongside the Corpus Christi Clippers, Waco Pirates, Tyler Tigers, Galveston White Caps, Port Arthur Sea Hawks, Harlingen Capitals and Austin Pioneers in league play. The franchise folded after the season.

In 1956, the Beaumont Exporters, a St. Louis Cardinals affiliate in the Big State League briefly moved to Texas City and became the Texas City Exporters. The Exporters moved to Texas City on July 2, 1956, only to move back to Beaumont, Texas on July 8, 1956. Then, the Lubbock Hubbers, also of the Big State League, moved from Lubbock, Texas to Texas City on July 8, 1956, completing the season as the Texas City Texans. The team was an affiliate of the Baltimore Orioles. After the 1956 season, the Texas City franchise folded. The Big States League folded after the 1957 season.

In 1977, the Texas City Stars became members of the newly formed Class A Lone Star League, joining the Beeville Blazers, Corpus Christi Seagulls, Harlingen Suns, McAllen Dusters, and Victoria Rosebuds. The league had first formed as the Gulf States League in 1976. The Texas City Stars finished 16–22 in the Lone Star League first half standings. The Stars then won the second half in the North Division at 19–19. However, the playoffs were cancelled when the Corpus Christi Seagulls declined to participate in post-season play. The Lone Star League then folded after the 1977 season.

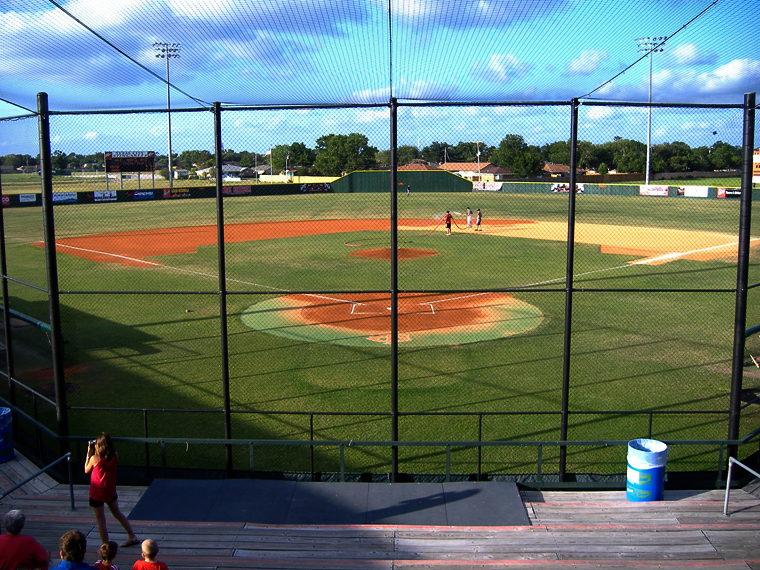
(2009) Robinson Stadium. Texas City, Texas

== The ballpark ==
Texas City hosted minor league home games at Texan Park. The ballpark was also known as Pilot Park in the era. The ballpark had a capacity of 2,750 with dimensions (Left, Center, Right): 335–385–335. The franchise drew between 46,000 and 35,000 total during its minor league seasons of 1951 to 1955, averaging 500 to 600 fans per contest. Today, the ballpark site is still in use, known as Robinson Stadium. Robinson Stadium hosted the Bay Area Toros in the independent Continental Baseball League. The ballpark lies within Amoco Park. The location of Amoco Park is 1500 29th Street North in Texas City, Texas.

== Notable alumni ==
- Rollie Hemsley (1951) 5x MLB All-Star
- Red Murff (1951)
- Tony Taylor (1954) 2x MLB All-Star; Philadelphia Phillies Wall of Fame
- Barney White (1954)
- Les Fleming (1956)
- Ford Garrison (1956)
- Bill Lajoie (1956)
- Mickey Livingston (1956)
- Ron Moeller (1956)
- Ray Robinson (1956)
- Willie Tasby (1956)
- Al Gallagher (1977)
- Rickey Hill (1977)
- Texas City Pilots players
- Texas City Texans players
