= Big State League =

- Classification: Class B (1947–1957)
- Sport: Minor League Baseball
- First season: 1947
- Folded: 1957
- President: Walter Morris (1947–1950); Howard Green (1951–1955); Hal Sayles (1956–1957)
- No. of teams: 22
- Country: United States of America
- Most titles: 2 Corpus Christi Clippers (1955-1956); Texarkana Bears (1947, 1950); Wichita Falls Spudders (1949, 1953)
- Related competitions: Texas League

The Big State League was a mid-level, Class B level circuit in American minor league baseball that played for 11 seasons, from 1947 through 1957. Its member clubs were exclusively based in Texas. The Corpus Christi Clippers (1955-1956), Texarkana Bears (1947, 1950) and Wichita Falls Spudders (1949, 1953) each won two league championships.

== History ==
It saw much change in its 11-year lifetime, with no team serving as a member in every single season. Waco came the closest, serving from 1947 to 1956. The league was known as an offense-oriented circuit.

The league debuted at the height of the short-lived postwar minor league baseball boom, in 1947, with eight clubs, all unaffiliated with Major League Baseball farm systems. Original teams were the: Austin Pioneers, Gainesville Owls, Greenville Majors, Paris Red Peppers, Sherman–Denison Twins, Texarkana Bears, Waco Dons and Wichita Falls Spudders.

Two clubs, Texarkana and Greenville, won more than 100 games in 1947, and four league members exceeded 100,000 in attendance. But beginning in 1953, the Big State League's teams struggled to reach six figures in that category. Only Corpus Christi drew over the 100,000 mark during the league's final five seasons, doing so on two occasions. The league was further weakened when a traditionally strong member, Austin, moved up to the AA Texas League in 1956.

The league began the 1957 campaign with only six clubs: the Victoria Rosebuds, Corpus Christi Clippers, Beaumont Pirates, Abilene Blue Sox, Port Arthur Redlegs and Wichita Falls Spudders. Its ranks were reduced to four when Wichita Falls disbanded in May, while the Port Arthur team moved to Temple that same month before folding in August. Of the surviving teams, Victoria, a Brooklyn Dodgers farm team, outlasted Corpus Christi, Beaumont and Abilene to win the league's last pennant and playoff championship.

J. Walter Morris served as League President from 1947 through 1950, Howard Green, took over from 1951 through 1955 and Hal Sayles was in charge the final two years, 1956–57.

== Cities represented ==
- Abilene, Texas: Abilene Blue Sox 1956–1957, moved from West Texas–New Mexico League 1946–1955
- Austin, Texas: Austin Pioneers 1947–1955
- Beaumont, Texas: Beaumont Exporters or Beaumont Shippers (depending on source) 1956; Beaumont Pirates 1957
- Bryan, Texas: Bryan Majors 1953; Bryan Indians 1954
- Corpus Christi, Texas: Corpus Christi Clippers 1954–1957
- Del Rio, Texas: Del Rio Indians 1954
- Gainesville, Texas: Gainesville Owls 1947–1951
- Galveston, Texas: Galveston White Caps 1954–1955, moved from Gulf Coast League 1950–1953
- Greenville, Texas: Greenville Majors 1947–1950, moved from East Texas League 1946; Greenville Majors 1953
- Harlingen, Texas: Harlingen Capitals 1954–1955, moved from Gulf Coast League 1951–1953 and Rio Grande Valley League 1950
- Longview, Texas: Longview Cherokees 1952–1953
- Lubbock, Texas: Lubbock Hubbers 1956, moved from West Texas–New Mexico League 1938–1942, 1946–1955
- Paris, Texas: Paris Red Peppers 1947, moved from East Texas League 1946; Paris Panthers 1948; Paris Indians 1952–1953
- Port Arthur, Texas: Port Arthur Sea Hawks 1955–1956, moved from Evangeline League 1954 and Gulf Coast League 1950–1953; Port Arthur Redlegs 1957
- Sherman, Texas and Denison, Texas: Sherman–Denison Twins 1947–1951
- Temple, Texas: Temple Eagles 1949–1954; Temple Redlegs 1957
- Texarkana, Texas: Texarkana Bears 1947–1953, moved from East Texas League 1946
- Texas City, Texas: Texas City Texans 1955; Texas City Exporters 1956
- Tyler, Texas: Tyler East Texans 1951–1953; Tyler Tigers 1954–1955
- Victoria, Texas: Victoria Eagles 1956; Victoria Rosebuds 1957, moved to Texas League 1958–1961
- Waco, Texas: Waco Dons 1947; Waco Pirates 1948–1953, 1954–1956
- Wichita Falls, Texas: Wichita Falls Spudders 1947–1953, moved to Longhorn League 1954; Wichita Falls Spudders 1956–1957

== Standings & statistics ==
=== 1947 to 1952 ===
1947 Big State League
schedule

Team standings	Won	Lost	Pct	GB	Attend	Managers
Texarkana Bears	101	53	.655	-	140,333	Vern Washington
Greenville Majors	100	54	.649	1	154,356	Harry Davis, Jr.
Wichita Falls Spudders	92	61	.601	8	92,553	Bobby Goff
Paris Red Peppers	80	74	.519	21	112,449	Lloyd Rigby
Sherman-Denison Twins	69	85	.448	32	81,550	Guy Sturdy
Gainesville Owls	65	87	.428	35	60,971	Leroy Gilchrist
Austin Pioneers	55	99	.357	46	106,099	Beau Bell
Waco Dons	52	101	.340	48	52,577	Red Barkley
Total attendance					800,888	

Season highlights
Playoffs: Texarkana Bears beat the Paris Red Peppers 4 games to 0.; Wichita Falls Spudders over the Greenville Majors 4 games to 2.
Finals:Texarkana Bears 4 games to 2 over the Wichita Falls Spudders.
Vern Washington of the Texarkana Bears led all hitters with a .404 batting average. Buck Frierson of the Sherman-Denison Twins led the league in four categories: 188 runs scored, 248 hits, 197 RBI and 58 home runs. Vallie Eaves, Texarkana Bears pitched his team to 25 wins and Nathaniel Love of the Greenville Majors struck out 192 opposing batters. Jim Walkup of the Paris Red Peppers led the league with a 3.72 ERA.

1948 Season Big State League
schedule

Team standings	Won	Lost	Pct.	GB	Attend	Managers
Sherman-Denison Twins	94	51	.648	-	117,046	Jose Rodriquez
Wichita Falls Spudders	84	62	.575	10½	130,138	Marcus Carrola
Waco Pirates	82	64	.562	12½	82,762	Buster Chatham
Austin Pioneers	79	67	.541	15½	163,666	Prince Oana
Gainesville Owls	69	77	.473	25½	80,479	Babe Peebles / Jackie Reid
Paris Panthers	62	85	.422	33½	72,636	Homer Peel
Texarkana Bears	60	83	.420	33	70,508	Ed Borom
Greenville Majors	52	93	.359	42½	67,334	Buddy Hancken / Nat Love
Total attendance					784,569	

Season highlights
Playoffs: Sherman-Denison Twins 4 games Austin Pioneers 1; Wichita Falls Spudders 4 games Waco Pirates 0
Finals:Sherman-Denison Twins 4 wins Wichita Falls Spudders 3 wins.
Vern Washington of the Texarkana Bears again led the league in hitting, this time with a .384 average. Donald Cena of the Waco Pirates scored 142 runs to lead that stat. The trio from Wichita Falls Spudders of Paul Brotherton with 218 hits, Jack Bradsher, with 152 RBI and Albert McCarty with 32 HR, led those departments. Thomas Finger of the Wichita Falls Spudders had 21 wins to lead all pitchers and Glenn Blackwood who split time with the Greenville Majors and the Wichita Falls Spudders led the league with 176 strikeouts. Rafael Rivas of the Sherman-Denison Twins had a 2.33 ERA.

1949 Big State League
schedule

Team standings	Won	Lost	Pct	GB	Attend	Managers
Wichita Falls Spudders	90	58	.608	-	128,400	Jack Bradsher
Texarkana Bears	86	61	.585	3½	96,522	George Archie
Austin Pioneers	86	62	.562	4	188,193	Prince Oana
Waco Pirates	76	72	.514	14	95,825	Buddy Hancken
Sherman-Denison Twins	70	78	.473	20	77,474	Lloyd Brown / Pete Appleton
Greenville Majors	66	82	.446	24	58,500	Red Davis
Gainesville Owls	59	89	.399	31	66,544	Ray Taylor / Lon Goldstein
Temple Eagles	58	89	.395	31½	72,624	Barney White / Homer Peel
Total attendance					784,082	

Season highlights
Playoffs:Waco Pirates over the Wichita Falls Spudders 4 games to 2; Texarkana Bears over the Austin Pioneers 4 games to 1.
Finals: Waco Pirates 4 games to 1 over the Texarkana Bears.
Frank Saucier of the Wichita Falls Spudders led the league in hitting with an average of .446 and his teammate Al McCarty scored 132 runs. Frank Carswell of the Texarkana Bears had the most hits with 229 and also led in RBI with 145. Conklyn Meriwether of the Greenville Majors had 27 HR. 3 pitchers had an even 20 wins: Elwood Moore and George Estock of the Austin Pioneers and Sidney Peterson of Wichita Falls Spudders. William Pierro of the Waco Pirates struck out 275 batters and John Whitehead of the Sherman-Denison Twins led with a 2.73 ERA.

1950 Big State League

Team standings	Won	Lost	Pct	GB	Attend	Managers
Texarkana Bears	93	51	.646	-	83,604	George Archie
Gainesville Owls	82	63	.566	11½	56,890	James Adair
Wichita Falls Spudders	80	66	.548	14	103,439	Hack Miller
Temple Eagles	74	70	.514	19	105,081	Lou Finney
Greenville Majors	75	71	.514	19	50,511	Bill Gann
Waco Pirates	72	76	.486	23	85,173	Buddy Hancken
Sherman-Denison Twins	54	91	.372	39½	48,762	Homer Peel
Austin Pioneers	52	94	.356	42	116,941	Prince Oana / David Sarver
Total attendance					650,401	

Season highlights:
Playoffs: Texarkana Bears over Temple Eagles 4 to 2; Greenville Majors over Wichita Falls Spudders 4 to 2.
Finals: Texarkana Bears over Greenville Majors 4 to 2.
Frank Carswell of the Texarkana Bears was the leading hitter with an even .400 average. His teammate Lou Fitzgerald scored 138 runs and their teammate Milan Vacelich had 144 RBI. The Waco Pirates slugger John Powers busted 39 four baggers. Junior Bunch had 19 wins for the Temple Eagles. The strikeout leader, Jodie Phipps of the Texarkana Bears struck out 173 batters. Carmen Ferullo of the Wichita Falls Spudders led the league with a 2.89 ERA.

1951 Big State League
schedule

Team standings	Won	Lost	Pct	GB	Attend	Managers
Gainesville Owls	89	58	.605	-	50,771	Hal Van Pelt
Temple Eagles	88	60	.595	1½	112,022	Bill Herring / Jack Bradsher
Sherman-Denison Twins	79	68	.537	10	60,059	Bill Capps
Austin Pioneers	75	72	.510	14	147,161	Thomas Jordan
Waco Pirates	75	73	.507	14½	61,371	Walt Tauscher
Texarkana Bears	71	77	.480	18½	57,640	Prince Oana / Joe Phipps; Gabby Lusk
Wichita Falls Spudders	66	82	.446	23½	73,415	Bruce Ogrodowski / Cecil McClung
Tyler East Texans	47	100	.320	42	41,541	Hal Epps / Joe Kracher / Gale Pringle
Total attendance					604,100	

Season highlights:
Playoffs:
Gainesville Owls 4 games, Austin Pioneers 2; Sherman-Denison Twins 4 games, Temple Eagles 1.
Finals: Gainesville Owls 4 games, Sherman-Denison Twins 1.
Les Goldstein of the Temple Eagles led all hitters with a .376 average and his teammate Frederick Bell had 216 hits. Bobby Phillips of the Wichita Falls Spudders scored 128 runs and Dean Stafford of the Sherman-Denison Twins led the league in both RBI, with 151 and home runs with 32. Lee Roy Jones of the Austin Pioneers and George O'Donnell of the Waco Pirates had 22 wins each and Robert Upton of the Gainesville Owls led in strikeouts with 209 and also with an ERA of 2.54.

1952 Big State League
schedule

Team standings	Won	Lost	Pct	GB	Attend	Managers
Temple Eagles	85	62	.578	-	101,906	Salty Parker
Tyler East Texans	84	63	.571	1	73,337	Bill Capps
Texarkana Bears	82	65	.559	3	79,275	Tony York
Austin Pioneers	81	66	.551	4	149,601	Thomas Jordan
Paris Indians	79	68	.537	6	77,761	Red Davis
Wichita Falls Spudders	77	70	.524	8	95,240	Frank Mancuso
Longview Cherokees	71	76	.483	14	59,913	Clem Hausmann / Lou Fitzgerald
Waco Pirates	29	118	.197	56	32,966	Tedd Gullic
Total attendance					669,999	

Season highlights:
Playoffs: Austin Pioneers 4 games, Temple Eagles 1; Tyler East Texans 4 games, Texarkana Bears 2.
Finals: Tyler East Texans 4 games, Austin Pioneers 0.
Bob Van Enman of the Wichita Falls Spudders led in hitting with a .387 average. His teammate Billy Queen scored 157 runs while Buck Frierson of the Paris Indians had 222 base hits. Roy Sanner of the Texarkana Bears had 165 RBI and Dean Stafford of the Paris Indians /Tyler East Texans busted 47 home runs. John Andre of the Austin Pioneers led the league with 25 wins and Gale Pringle of the Tyler East Texans had 164 strikeouts and a 2.93 ERA.

=== 1953 to 1957 ===
1953 Big State League
schedule

Team standings	Won	Lost	Pct	GB	Attend	Managers
Wichita Falls Spudders	85	58	.594	-	71,247	Whitey Wietelmann
Tyler East Texans	81	63	.563	4½	50,273	Bill Capps
Texarkana Bears	78	68	.534	8½	89,604	Chuck Hawley
Waco Pirates / Longview Cherokees	77	68	.531	9	32,646	Buster Chatham
Temple Eagles	72	73	.497	14	66,341	Salty Parker / Len Goldstein
Greenville Majors/Bryan Majors	70	77	.476	17	30,051	Jim Adair / Clyde McDowell
Austin Pioneers	69	77	.473	17½	73,229	Al Unser
Paris Indians	48	96	.333	47½	40,658	Red Davis
Total attendance					454,049	

Season highlights:
Waco moved to Longview, May 22; Greenville moved to Bryan, June 25.
Playoffs: Wichita Falls Spudders 4 games, Longview Cherokees 0;Tyler East Texans 4 games, Texarkana Bears 1.
Finals: Wichita Falls Spudders 4 games, Tyler East Texans 3.
Albert Neil of the Wichita Falls Spudders led five different offensive categories: .356 BA, 185 hits, 126 runs, 137 RBI and 39 home runs. Pat Scantlebury of the Texarkana Bears won 24 games and struck out 177. Jodie Phipps of the Bryan Majors had a 2.19 ERA.

1954 Big State League
schedule

Team standings	Won	Lost	Pct	GB	Attend	Managers
Waco Pirates	105	42	.714	-	79,201	Jack Paepke
Tyler Tigers	92	55	.626	13	56,361	Salty Parker
Corpus Christi Clippers	87	60	.592	18	97,255	Bill Capps
Austin Pioneers	79	67	.541	25½	85,119	George Hausmann
Galveston White Caps	73	73	.500	31½	34,205	Chase Riddle / Henry Robinson
Bryan Indians / Del Rio Indians	53	93	.363	51½	34,217	Ray Taylor / Al LaMacchia; Chuck Hawley
Harlingen Capitals	53	94	.361	52	47,825	Earl Caldwell / Sam Harshaney
Temple Eagles	44	102	.301	60½	31,673	Fred Martin / Fred Campbell; Robert Moyer
Total attendance					465,856	

Season highlights:
Bryan moved to Del Rio, July 28.
Playoffs: Waco Pirates 4 games, Austin Pioneers 2; Corpus Christi Clippers 4 games, Tyler Tigers 1.
Finals: Waco Pirates 4 games, Corpus Christi Clippers 3.
Dean Stafford of the Galveston White Caps and the Corpus Christi Clippers led the league in hitting with a .362 average, hits with 212, had 171 RBI to go with 38 home runs. John Wilkinson of the Temple Eagles and Corpus Christi Clippers scored 151 runs. James Vitter of the Corpus Christi Clippers had 23 wins, while Gayle Pringle of the Tyler Tigers struck out 212 with a 2.58 ERA.

1955 Big State League
schedule

Team standings	Won	Lost	Pct	GB	Attend	Managers
Corpus Christi Clippers	93	48	.660	-	102,788	Connie Ryan
Waco Pirates	74	69	.517	20	53,961	Stan Wentzel
Texas City Texans	71	67	.514	20½	35,402	Bones Sanders
Port Arthur Sea Hawks	64	74	.464	27½	71,063	Lou Fitzgerald / Earl Perry / Jack Bumgarner
Harlingen Capitals	65	79	.451	29½	55,418	Ford Garrison
Austin Pioneers	58	85	.406	36	50,536	George Hausmann
Tyler Tigers	36	37	.493	NA	26,443	Jodie Phipps
Galveston White Caps	28	30	.483	NA	19,600	Jodie Beeler
Total attendance					415,211	

Season highlights:
Galveston withdrew June 12; Tyler withdrew July 1.
Playoffs:Corpus Christi Clippers 4 games, Harlingen Capitals 1; Waco Pirates 4 games, Texas City Texans 3.
Finals: Corpus Christi Clippers 4 games, Waco Pirates 0.
Lynn Vandehey of the Texas City Texans led the league with a batting average of .377 and also led in total hits with 195. The Corpus Christi Clippers trio of Ed Charles with 135 runs scored, Dean Stafford with 159 RBI and Keith Little hit 47 home runs to lead those categories. Rene Vega of the Corpus Christi Clippers had 28 wins and a 2.69 ERA. Don Rowe of the Waco Pirates had 226 strikeouts.

1956 Big State League
schedule

Team standings	Won	Lost	Pct	GB	Attend	Managers
Corpus Christi Clippers	83	57	.593	-	112,625	Sibby Sisti
Port Arthur Sea Hawks	78	62	.557	5	57,117	Lloyd Gearhart / Al Barillari
Waco Pirates	78	62	.557	5	39,096	Monty Basgall
Wichita Falls Spudders	76	64	.543	7	60,891	Danny Ozark
Abilene Blue Sox	73	67	.521	10	83,700	Alfred Evans
Lubbock Hubbers/Texas City Texans	59	81	.421	24	53,900	Bill Krueger / Jay Haney
Beaumont Exporters	57	83	.407	26	35,000	Ford Garrison
Victoria Eagles	56	84	.400	27	35,639	James Basso / Lou Fitzgerald / Stubby Greer
Total attendance					477,968	

Season Highlights:
Lubbock transferred to Texas City July 8; Beaumont moved to Texas City July 2, and returned, July 8.
Playoffs:Corpus Christi Clippers 4 games, Wichita Falls Spudders 1.; Port Arthur Sea Hawks 4 games, Waco Pirates 3.
Finals:Port Arthur Sea Hawks 4 games, Corpus Christi Clippers 3.
James Kirby of the Port Arthur Sea Hawks was the league's leading hitter with a .358 average and 190 hits. Joe Christian of the Corpus Christi Clippers scored 119 runs with 142 RBI. Danny Ozark of the Wichita Falls Spudders homered 32 times and tied with Rudolph Mayling of the Abilene Blue Sox in the home run category. Leverette Spencer of the Port Arthur Sea Hawks had 21 pitching victories and a league best 2.37 ERA. Ramon Salgado with the Waco Pirates and Herman Greene of the Corpus Christi Clippers also had 21 pitching wins. Evans Killeen of the Abilene Blue Sox had 236 Strikeouts to lead the league.

1957 Big State League
schedule

Team standings	Won	Lost	Pct	GB	Attend	Managers
Victoria Rosebuds	75	49	.605	-	42,378	Lou Rochelli
Corpus Christi Clippers	69	58	.543	7½	56,871	Joe Just / Jack Wilkinson
Beaumont Pirates	61	63	.492	14	56,342	Monty Basgall
Abilene Blue Sox	61	66	.480	15½	29,995	Burl Storie
Port Arthur Redlegs / Temple Redlegs	48	56	.461	NA	25,484	Al Barillari
Wichita Falls Spudders	4	26	.013	NA	2,558	Jack Wilkinson / Jodie Beeler
Total attendance					214,628	

Season Highlights:
Playoffs: In a shortened format, the Victoria Rosebuds beat the Corpus Christi Clippers 4 games to 1.
Wichita Falls withdrew May 23.
Port Arthur (20-15) moved to Temple May 30. Temple withdrew August 20.
Tony Washington of the Beaumont Pirates led the last year of the league in hitting with a .356 average. He also led with 179 hits. Nate Peeples of the Corpus Christi Clippers scored 116 runs and had 99 RBI to lead those categories. Don Miles of the Victoria Rosebuds hit 28 home runs. In the pitching finalie, Chris Niclosi of the Victoria Rosebuds had 21 wins and 208 strikeouts and Dave Wickersham of the Beaumont Pirates had a 1.95 ERA to lead the league.
