= Paris Indians =

The Paris Indians were a minor league baseball team based in Paris, Texas that played in the Big State League from 1952 to 1953. The club was managed by Red Davis and featured major leaguers Vicente Amor, Alex Carrasquel, Davis, Buck Frierson, Jim Kirby in 1952 and Red Barrett, Clarence Beers, Carrasquel, Davis, Frierson and Carlos Paula in 1953.
