= Austin Pioneers =

- 1947–1955; Austin, Texas

Minor league affiliations
- Class: Class B (1947–1955)
- League: Big State League (1947–1955)

Major league affiliations
- Team: None

Minor league titles
- League titles (0): None
- Wild card berths (5): 1948; 1949; 1951; 1952; 1954

Team data
- Name: Austin Pioneers (1947–1955)
- Ballpark: Disch Field (1947–1955)

The Austin Pioneers were a minor league baseball team based in Austin, Texas from 1947 to 1955. The Pioneers were founding members of the Class B level Big State League, qualifying for the playoffs in five seasons and hosting home games at Disch Field.

The Pioneers were preceded by the 1915 Austin Representatives and succeeded by the 1956 Austin Senators.

== History ==
Preceded in Austin by the Austin Senators, the Austin Pioneers were founded, owned and operated by Edmund P. Knebel, a local bottler of 7-Up and Nu-Grape soft drinks. Knebel had Disch Field constructed for the Pioneers. Knebel sold the team after the 1955 season, when the franchise moved to the Texas League and renamed the Austin Senators.

The Pioneers began play in the Big State League in 1947, joining the Gainesville Owls, Greenville Majors, Paris Red Peppers, Sherman–Denison Twins, Texarkana Bears, Waco Dons and Wichita Falls Spudders as charter members.

The Pioneers never finished higher than 3rd place in the Big State League standings during their nine seasons of play in the league. Austin qualified for the playoffs in five Big State League seasons and advanced to the Finals in 1952.

Minor league baseball began in Austin with the 1888 Austin Senators. The Pioneers were preceded in minor league play by the 1915 Austin Representatives and succeeded by the 1956 Austin Senators.

== The ballpark ==
The Austin Pioneers played minor league home games at Disch Field. Located next to the Colorado River, the ballpark was built for the beginning of the 1947 season, financed by Pioneers' owner Edmund Knebel. Named after collegiate coach Billy Disch, the original ballpark was demolished in 1975. Today, UFCU Disch–Falk Field is a collegiate field, located on the campus of the University of Texas at Austin.

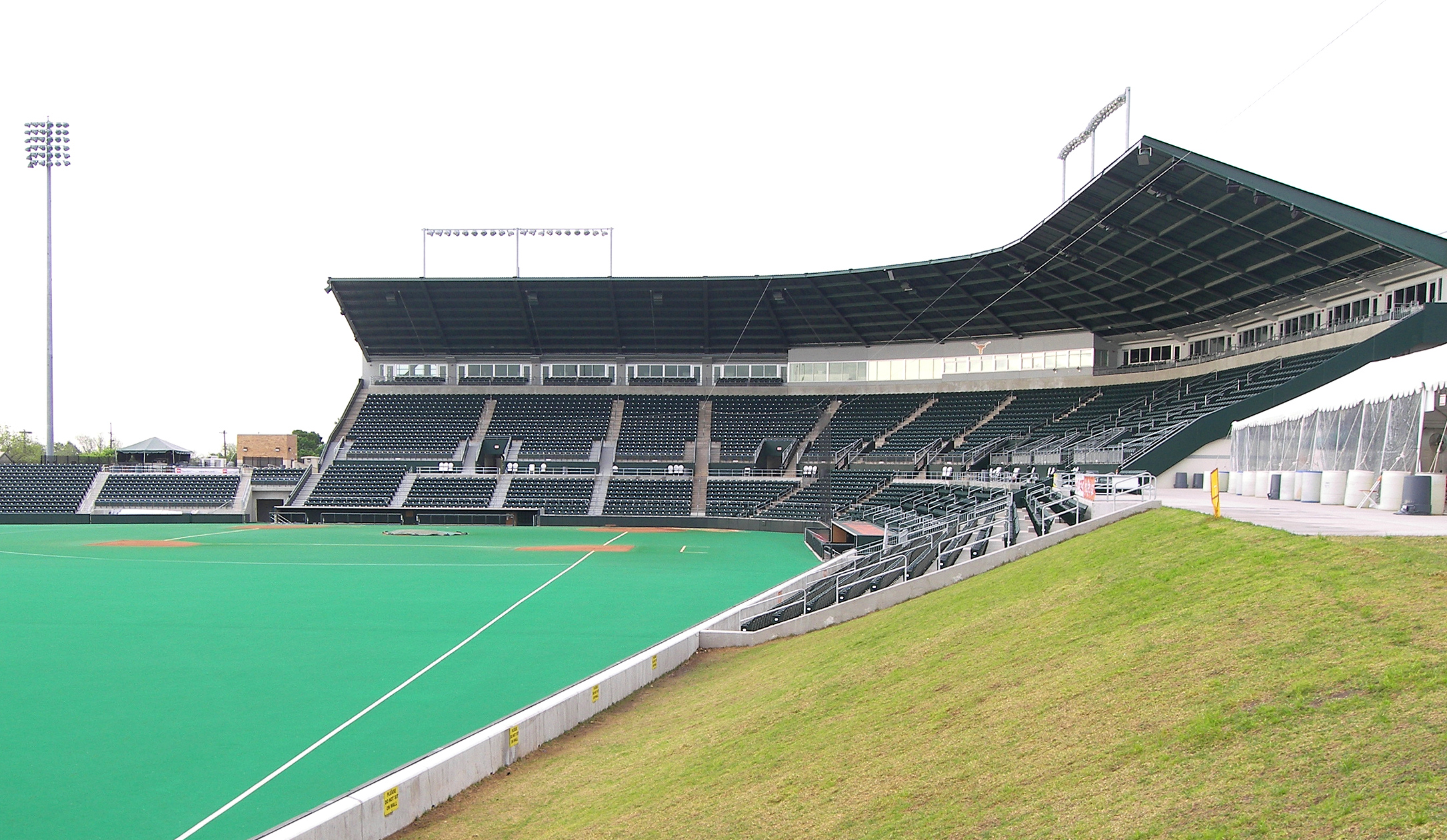
(2008) Disch-Falk Field. Austin, Texas

== Timeline ==
Year(s)	# Yrs.	Team	Level	League	Ballpark
1947–1955	9	Austin Pioneers	Class B	Big State League	Disch Field

== Year–by–year record ==
Year	Record	Finish	Manager	Playoffs/Notes
1947	55–99	7th	Beau Bell	Did not qualify
1948	79–67	4th	Prince Oana	Lost in 1st round
1949	86–62	3rd	Prince Oana	Lost in 1st round
1950	52–94	8th	Prince Oana / David Sarver	Did not qualify
1951	75–72	4th	Tom Jordan	Lost in 1st round
1952	81–66	4th	Tom Jordan	Lost League Finals
1953	69–77	7th	Al Unser	Did not qualify
1954	79–67	4th	George Hausmann	Lost in 1st round
1955	58–85	6th	George Hausmann	Did not qualify

== Notable alumni ==
- John André (1952)
- Beau Bell (1947, MGR) MLB All-Star
- Fred Campbell (1949)
- Aubrey Davis (1947)
- George Estock (1947–1949)
- Ángel Fleitas (1952)
- Sam Harshany (1947)
- George Hausmann (1954–1955, MGR)
- Tex Hughson (1948) 3x MLB All-Star; Boston Red Sox Hall of Fame
- Tom Jordan (1951–1952, MGR)
- Tom Kirk (1953)
- Al LaMacchia (1952–1953)
- Al Monchak (1948)
- Prince Oana (1948–1950, MGR)
- Al Unser (1953, MGR)

== See also ==
Austin Pioneers players
