= Frank Carswell =

American baseball player (1919–1998)

- Outfielder
- Born: November 6, 1919; Palestine, Texas, U.S.
- Died: October 16, 1998 (aged 78); Houston, Texas, U.S.
- Batted: Right Threw: Right

MLB debut
- April 17, 1953, for the Detroit Tigers

Last MLB appearance
- May 30, 1953, for the Detroit Tigers

MLB statistics
- Batting average: .267
- Home runs: 0
- Runs batted in: 2
- Stats at Baseball Reference

Teams
- Detroit Tigers (1953)

Frank Willis Carswell (November 6, 1919 – October 16, 1998) was an American third baseman, first baseman, outfielder, manager and scout in professional baseball. Although he played only 16 Major League Baseball games in his career, for the 1953 Detroit Tigers, Carswell was one of the top minor league hitters of the post-World War II era.

Born in Palestine, Texas, Carswell attended Rice University. He threw and batted right-handed, stood 6 feet (1.8 m) tall and weighed 195 pounds (88 kg). He signed with the Tigers in 1941, and batted .338 in 275 at bats for the Jamestown Falcons of the Class D Pennsylvania–Ontario–New York League (PONY League). But the U.S. entered World War II after that season, and Carswell lost four years while serving in the United States Marine Corps. By the time he returned to pick up his baseball career, he was 26 years old and his prospects for MLB stardom had been dimmed. After spending the 1946 season with the Dallas Rebels of the Double-A Texas League, Carswell was demoted to lower minor leagues for much of 1947–50, where he put up prodigious batting numbers. With the 1947 Paris Red Peppers of the Class B Big State League, Carswell earned All-Star third baseman honors, batting .364 with 36 home runs and 145 runs batted in. Two years later, with the Texarkana Bears of the same circuit, Carswell led the league in RBIs (145) and batting average (.386).

But Carswell's slugging was not confined to the mid-minor leagues. The parent Tigers promoted him, at age 31, to the Buffalo Bisons of the Triple-A International League in 1951, and Carswell batted .302. In 1952, he led the International League in homers (30) and batting average (.344). Then in 1953 he once again batted over .300 for Buffalo and, at 33, had his "cup of coffee" in the American League for the Tigers. In six weeks, Carswell appeared in 16 games and batted 15 times with four hits, all singles, and two RBIs for a .267 batting mark. He then returned to Buffalo to hit over .300 for the remainder of 1953 and all of 1954. All told, Carswell played 13 minor league seasons, compiled a lifetime batting average of .337 and hit 209 home runs.

His managing career began in early 1957 when, still an active player, he was interim manager of the Portland Beavers of the Pacific Coast League after the sudden death from a perforated ulcer of skipper Bill Sweeney on April 18. The following season, he rejoined the Detroit farm system as a full-time manager, working his way up from Class D to Triple-A (including assignments with the Syracuse Chiefs and the Toledo Mud Hens) over the next 13 years (1958–70).

Carswell died at age 78 in Houston, Texas. He was named to the International League Hall of Fame in 2010.

Preceded by Bill Sweeney	Portland Beavers manager 1957	Succeeded by Bill Posedel
Preceded by Frank Skaff	Knoxville Smokies manager 1961–1963	Succeeded by Frank Lary
Preceded by Bob Swift	Syracuse Chiefs manager 1963–1966	Succeeded by Gary Blaylock
Preceded by Wayne Blackburn	Montgomery Rebels manager 1967–1969	Succeeded by Stubby Overmire
Preceded by Jack Tighe	Toledo Mud Hens manager 1970	Succeeded by Mike Roarke
