= Longview Cherokees =

Texas minor league baseball team

The Longview Cherokees were a Big State League baseball team based in Longview, Texas that existed in 1952. They went 71–76 in their only year of existence.

Clem Hausmann and Andy Anderson played for them.
