= Al Silvera =

American baseball player (1935–2002)

- Leftfielder
- Born: August 26, 1935; San Diego, California, U.S.
- Died: July 24, 2002 (aged 66); Los Angeles, California, U.S.
- Batted: Right Threw: Right

MLB debut
- June 12, 1955, for the Cincinnati Redlegs

Last MLB appearance
- May 8, 1956, for the Cincinnati Redlegs

MLB statistics
- Batting average: .143
- Home runs: 0
- Runs batted in: 2
- Stats at Baseball Reference

Teams
- Cincinnati Redlegs (1955–1956)

Aaron Albert Silvera (August 26, 1935 – July 24, 2002) was an American professional baseball player, an outfielder who played parts of two seasons for the Cincinnati Redlegs of Major League Baseball in 1955–1956.

== Early and personal life ==
Silvera was born in San Diego, California, to Albert and Victoria Silvera. He was Jewish, and of Jewish and Italian descent on his paternal side and of Syrian Jewish descent on his maternal side. He was the nephew of former major league pitcher "Subway Sam" Nahem. He threw and batted right-handed, stood 6 feet (1.8 m) tall and weighed 180 pounds (82 kg).

A resident of Beverly Hills, California, Silvera died in Los Angeles at age 66. He was buried at the Hillside Memorial Park Cemetery in nearby Culver City, California.

== High school and college ==
Silvera attended Fairfax High School in Los Angeles. In 1952, as a sophomore outfielder he was named to the All-Western League First Team. In 1953, he batted .500 and received All City honors, was named the Western League Player of the Year, and was named to the All-Western League First Team. In 1954, he batted .367 and received dual All-City and All-Western League Player of the Year honors.

He next attended the University of Southern California, where Silvera played for the USC Trojans baseball team and batted .405.

== Baseball career ==
Silvera signed a $20,000 (equivalent to $240,000 in 2025) bonus contract with the Cincinnati Redlegs as a 19-year-old in 1955, and was placed on Cincinnati's major league roster per the bonus rule of the time. He made his major league debut as a defensive replacement for leftfielder Ray Jablonski in a 12–8 road loss to the Philadelphia Phillies on June 12. After pinch running in his second game (for slow-footed catcher Smoky Burgess), Silvera finally had his first National League at bat as a pinch hitter for Roy McMillan in a 16–5 rout of the Phillies at Crosley Field June 26. His single to right field scored Rocky Bridges and Burgess. It was his only major league hit, driving home his two career runs batted in. He was injured shortly thereafter, and his baseball career was cut short.

Silvera appeared in ten more Cincinnati games in 1955, and one in 1956 (as a pinch runner). In addition to his one hit in seven at bats and two runs batted in, he scored three runs. The Redlegs released him in May 1956, and he played minor league baseball through 1958 before leaving the game. He played for the 1956 Port Arthur Sea Hawks and the 1956 Abilene Blue Sox in the Big State League, the 1957 Columbia Gems in the South Atlantic League and the 1957 Crowley Millers in the Evangeline League, and the 1958 Albany Senators in the Eastern League.

In 2003 he was inducted into the Southern California Jewish Sports Hall of Fame.

== See also ==
- List of baseball players who went directly to Major League Baseball
