= Carlos Paula =

Cuban baseball player (1927–1983)

- Right fielder
- Born: November 28, 1927; Havana, Cuba
- Died: April 25, 1983 (aged 55); Miami, Florida, U.S.
- Batted: Right Threw: Right

MLB debut
- September 6, 1954, for the Washington Senators

Last MLB appearance
- June 23, 1956, for the Washington Senators

MLB statistics
- Batting average: .271
- Home runs: 9
- Runs batted in: 60
- Stats at Baseball Reference

Teams
- Washington Senators (1954–1956)

Carlos Paula Conill (November 28, 1927 – April 25, 1983) was a Cuban Major League Baseball right fielder who played for the Washington Senators from 1954 to 1956. A native of Havana, Cuba, he stood 6'3" and weighed 195 lbs.

Paula was acquired by Washington via a transaction with the Paris Indians Big State League before the 1954 season. He was sent to the Senators Charlotte, North Carolina affiliate, the Charlotte Hornets, on March 30, 1954. When he made his major league debut (September 6, 1954 at Griffith Stadium), he became the first black player in Washington Senators history. He got into nine games that month.

He played in 115 games during the 1955 season, batting .299 with 6 home runs and 55 runs batted in. In 1956 he appeared in only 33 games and batted .183. His last game was on June 23. Paula was optioned to the Minneapolis Millers of the American Association on April 2, 1957. On April 12, 1958, he was sold by the Senators to the Sacramento Solons of the Pacific Coast League.

Career totals for 157 games include a .271 batting average (124-for-457), 9 HR, 60 RBI, 44 runs scored, and a slugging percentage of .416. In his 111 appearances in the outfield, he handled 211 out of 222 total chances successfully for a fielding percentage of .950, well below the league average during his era.

Paula died at the age of 55 in Miami, Florida.

== See also ==
- List of first black Major League Baseball players by team and date
