= Andy Anderson (baseball) =

American baseball player (1922–1982)

- Infielder
- Born: November 13, 1922; Bremerton, Washington, U.S.
- Died: July 18, 1982 (aged 59); Seattle, Washington, U.S.
- Batted: Right Threw: Right

MLB debut
- May 10, 1948, for the St. Louis Browns

Last MLB appearance
- October 2, 1949, for the St. Louis Browns

MLB statistics
- Batting average: .184
- Home runs: 2
- Runs batted in: 17
- Stats at Baseball Reference

Teams
- St. Louis Browns (1948–1949)

Andy Holm Anderson (November 13, 1922 – July 18, 1982) was an American professional baseball player whose career spanned 10 seasons, including two in Major League Baseball with the St. Louis Browns (1948–1949).

Over his major league career, Anderson compiled a batting average of .184 with 23 runs, 41 hits, eight doubles, one triple, two home runs and 17 runs batted in (RBIs) in 122 games played. Anderson also played in the minor leagues with the Class-D Paragould Browns (1941), the Class-B Springfield Browns (1942), the Double-A San Antonio Missions (1946–1947, 1950–1951), the Class-B Longview Cherokees (1952), the open-class Los Angeles Angels (1952), the Class-A Spokane Indians (1953) and the Class-A Yakima Bears (1953). Anderson also served in the United States Army during World War II. During his service, he was captured by German soldiers and held as a prisoner of war. He was later freed and resumed his baseball career.

== Professional career ==
=== Early career ===
Anderson was born on November 13, 1922, on Bremerton, Washington. He attended Silverdale High School and after graduation, was signed by St. Louis Browns scout Jack Fournier. In 1941, Anderson began his professional career with the Class-D Paragould Browns of the Northeast Arkansas League. He batted .259 with 112 hits, 15 doubles, five triples and one home run in 114 games played. On defense, Anderson played 64 games at shortstop, committing 24 errors in 252 total chances. During the 1942 season, Anderson played with the Springfield Browns of the Class-B Illinois–Indiana–Iowa League. In 109 games played that season, he batted .302 with 111 hits, 19 doubles, seven triples and 14 home runs. In the field, Anderson played 108 games at second base, committing 37 errors in 547 total chances. Amongst Illinois–Indiana–Iowa League batters, Anderson was fourth in home runs, behind Ducky Detweiler with 16 home runs, Tom Jordan with 22 home runs and Pat Seerey with 33 home runs.

=== World War II ===
On November 28, 1942, Anderson entered service in the United States Army. Although out of the professional circuit, Anderson did play amateur baseball in his home state of Washington before deploying overseas. Holding the rank of Private First Class, Anderson fought in Europe during World War II. On November 21, 1944, Anderson was captured by German soldiers and was held as a prisoner of war at Stalag IX-B in Bad Orb, Germany. Anderson, whose weight had dropped from 185 pounds (84 kg) to 125 pounds (57 kg), was rescued on May 4, 1945, just a few days before the end of World War II in Europe. To rehabilitate, Anderson was sent to Santa Barbara, California. Jack Fournier, the scout who originally signed Anderson, visited him when he was in Santa Barbara and told him that when he was ready, he could resume his job in the Browns organization.

=== Return to baseball ===
In 1946, a year after being rescued from a German prisoner of war camp, Anderson returned to the St. Louis Browns organization with the San Antonio Missions of the Double-A Texas League. With San Antonio that season, Anderson batted .246 with 126 hits, 24 doubles, three doubles and one home run in 142 games played. On defense, Anderson played shortstop and second base. He continued playing with San Antonio in 1947, playing in 147 games that season. In those games, Anderson batted .250 with 138 hits, 20 doubles and six home runs. Anderson again played both shortstop and second base in the field.

Anderson joined the St. Louis Browns during spring training in 1948, making the team going into regular season as a back-up infielder. Anderson made his Major League Baseball debut on May 10, 1948, against the Washington Senators, going hitless in one at-bat. His first major league hit came on May 19, against the New York Yankees. Against the Philadelphia Athletics on June 11, Anderson hit his first major league home run. During the 1948 season, Anderson batted .276 with 13 runs, 24 hits, five doubles, one triple, one home run and 12 runs batted in (RBIs) in 51 games played. On defense, Anderson played 21 games at second base, 10 games at shortstop and two games at first base. In 1949, Anderson again made the Browns major league roster. That season, he batted .125 with 10 runs, 17 hits, three doubles, one home run and five RBIs in 71 games played. In the field, Anderson played 44 games at shortstop, eight games at second base and eight games at third base.

=== Later career ===
In 1950, Anderson returned to the minor league and spent the season with the Double-A San Antonio Missions. He played 90 games that season, and batted .247 with 66 hits, nine double and five home runs. Anderson played third base and second base with the Missions that season. During the 1951 season, Anderson played just three games with the Missions, getting no hits. In those games, Anderson played shortstop. Anderson split the 1953 season with the Class-B Longview Cherokees and the open-class Los Angeles Angels. With the Cherokees, who played in the Big State League, Anderson batted .284 with 19 hits and five doubles in 20 games played. Anderson played 10 games with the Angeles, who were members of the Pacific Coast League and affiliated with the Chicago Cubs, he batted .227 with one run, five hits and one double. Anderson played with two teams in the 1954 season, the Class-A Spokane Indians and the Class-A Yakima Bears, both of the Western International League. Combined between the two teams, Anderson batted .234 with 71 hits, 12 doubles and one home run in 88 games played. In all of his 65 games in the field, Anderson played second base. That season would prove to be Anderson's last in professional baseball.

== Personal ==
Anderson was born on November 13, 1922, in Bremerton, Washington. He died on July 18, 1982, in Seattle, Washington, and was buried at Evergreen Washelli Memorial Park.
