= Greenville Majors =

The Greenville Majors minor league baseball team played in the East Texas League (1946), Big State League (1947–1950, 1953) and Sooner State League (1957). It was based in the American city of Greenville, Texas. The club was affiliated with the New York Yankees, whom they defeated in a 1949 home game at Majors Stadium. Both the stadium and team were named after Lt. Truett Jay Majors, the first youth from Greenville to be killed in WW2.

== Major league alumni ==
- Jimmy Adair
- Red Borom
- Gibby Brack
- Harry Davis
- John Davis
- Red Durrett
- Bubba Floyd
- Len Gilmore
- Sal Gliatto
- Buddy Hancken
- Bill Henry
- Alex Hooks
- Joe Koppe
- George Milstead
- Marshall Renfroe
- Lefty Scott
- Dick Stone
- Monty Stratton
- Jay Ward
- Jim Willis
- Bud Zipfel
