= Riverside Stadium (Victoria) =

Baseball venue in Victoria, Texas, US

Coordinates: 28.8131°N 97.0232°W

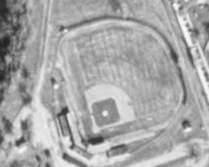
- Interactive map of Riverside Stadium
- Former names: Rosebud Stadium; Toro Stadium (1974)
- Location: 406 Memorial Drive; Victoria, Texas 77901
- Owner: City of Victoria
- Operator: Victoria Parks & Recreation

Construction
- Opened: May 9, 1947
- Cost: $25,000

Tenants
- Victoria Rosebuds (GVL, BSL/TL) (1947–1953, 1957–1961); Victoria Eagles (BSL) (1956); Victoria Toros (TL) (1974); Memorial HS (UIL) (2000–2010); UHV Jaguars (NAIA) (2007–present); Victoria Generals (TCL) (2009–present); Victoria East Titans (UIL) (2010–present); Victoria West Warriors (UIL) (2010–present)

Riverside Stadium is a ballpark located in Victoria, Texas, which is the current home of the UHV Jaguars baseball team and the Victoria Generals of the Texas Collegiate League. It is the former home of the Victoria Rosebuds, who played in the AA classification Texas League from 1958 to 1961. The stadium was opened in 1947 as a part of Riverside Park.
