= Jack Paepke =

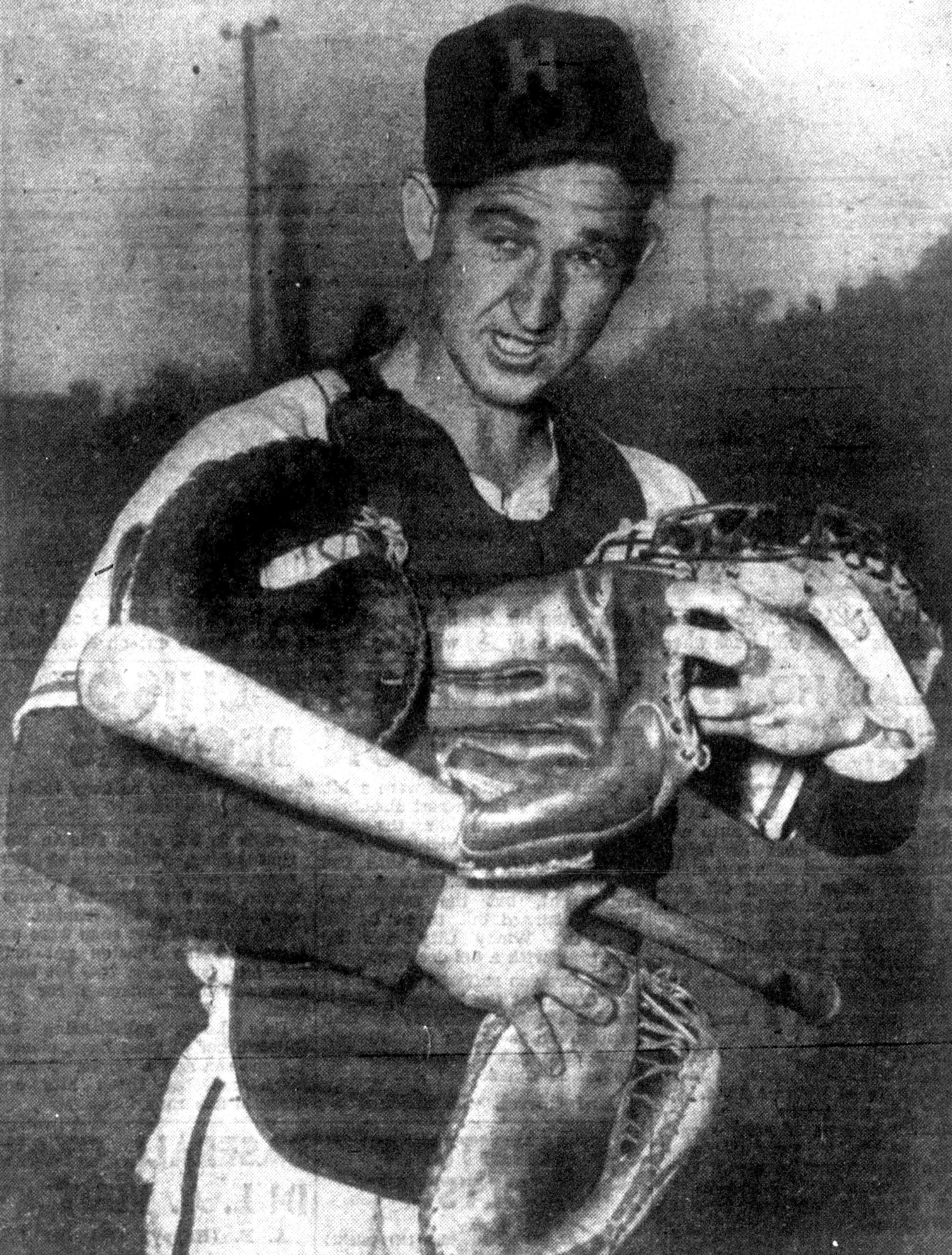
- Paepke, circa 1951
- Coach
- Born: August 28, 1922; Provo, Utah, U.S.
- Died: November 7, 2014 (aged 92); Ramona, California, U.S.
- Batted: Right Threw: Right

Teams
- Los Angeles/California Angels (1961–1966)

Jack Paepke (August 28, 1922 – November 7, 2014) was an American minor league baseball player, manager and player-manager who became a Major League Baseball coach and scout.

== Playing career ==
A native of Provo, Utah, Paepke had a 15-year playing career as a combination pitcher and catcher, with three seasons missed during World War II. He threw and batted right-handed and was listed as 6 feet 2 inches (1.88 m) tall and 220 pounds (100 kg). He began his career in the Brooklyn Dodgers' organization with Santa Barbara in the California League during the 1941 season. He had nine wins and five losses with a 3.44 ERA. This led to his promotion to the International League in 1942, where he played for Montreal. Before the season ended, Paepke joined the military, where he remained for the duration of the war. In 1946, he returned to Montreal and also played for the Fort Worth Cats in the Texas League where he posted a 2.17 ERA.

Paepke spent the 1947 and 1948 seasons in the American Association playing for St. Paul. After a brief stint back in Santa Barbara, Paepke played for the Hollywood Stars in the Pacific Coast League through the 1951 campaign. In 1952 he joined the Pittsburgh Pirates' organization, appearing for the New Orleans Pelicans in the Southern Association.

== Manager and coach ==
Paepke became a player-manager in 1953 and led his Brunswick Pirates to the Georgia–Florida League championship in his first year as skipper. He helped his own cause quite a bit by hitting .318 with 21 HRs and 109 RBI while compiling a 4–1 record on the mound. He was equally successful the following year when he led his Waco Pirates to Big State League crown. This Waco team won 105 games and has been named one of the top 25 minor league teams of all time by minor league baseball's official website. As he wound his way through the Pirate farm system, Paepke saw no more postseasons as a manager. Along the way he made stops as skipper of the Billings Mustangs, Salinas Packers, Kinston Eagles, Jamestown Falcons, Grand Forks Chiefs, San Jose Pirates and Las Vegas Wranglers. He ended his playing and managing career after the 1958 season.

Following his playing career, Paepke became a major league coach for the Los Angeles / California Angels from 1961, their maiden season, to 1966. He was later a scout for the Angels and eventually the Montreal Expos. His son Dennis, a catcher, played in all or parts of four seasons in the major leagues for the Kansas City Royals.

Preceded by Franchise established	Los Angeles/California Angels bullpen coach 1961–1966	Succeeded by Mike Roarke
