= Al Unser (baseball) =

American baseball player (1912–1995)

- Catcher
- Born: October 12, 1912; Morrisonville, Illinois, U.S.
- Died: July 7, 1995 (aged 82); Decatur, Illinois, U.S.
- Batted: Right Threw: Right

MLB debut
- September 14, 1942, for the Detroit Tigers

Last MLB appearance
- September 5, 1945, for the Cincinnati Reds

MLB statistics
- Batting average: .251
- Home runs: 4
- Runs batted in: 30
- Stats at Baseball Reference

Teams
- Detroit Tigers (1942–44); Cincinnati Reds (1945)

Albert Bernard Unser (October 12, 1912 – July 7, 1995) was an American Major League Baseball catcher who played for the Detroit Tigers (1942–1944) and Cincinnati Reds (1945). He was a native of Morrisonville, Illinois and the father of MLB center fielder Del Unser.

== Biography ==
Although Unser's major league career was short, he had a lengthy career in minor league baseball. He began his professional career in 1933, playing for three different minor league teams that season. He was picked up by the St. Louis Cardinals organization in 1934, playing in their farm system until 1940. In 1939, he served as manager of the class-D Gastonia Cardinals of the Tar Heel League, guiding them to the league championship.

In 1941, Unser joined the Tigers' farm system, spending that season with the Beaumont Exporters of the Texas League. He spent most of the 1942 season as a player-manager with the Winston-Salem Twins of the Piedmont League, and at the end of the season he joined the major league club. Unser became one of many baseball players who only appeared in the major leagues during World War II, making his major league debut at age 29 on September 14, 1942, in a home game against the Washington Senators at Briggs Stadium.

Over the next two seasons, Unser played sparingly for Detroit, spending part of each season in the minors with the Buffalo Bisons. The following season, he joined the Reds, where he had his best season in 1945. In his only full season in the majors, Unser batted .265 in 67 games with 3 home runs and 21 runs batted in (RBI). His career MLB totals for 120 games include a .251 batting average (85-for-338), 4 home runs, 30 RBI, 41 runs, .322 on-base percentage, and a slugging percentage of .355.

In 1946, Unser returned to the minor leagues with the Hollywood Stars of the Pacific Coast League, spending two seasons with the club. In 1948, he played with the Tulsa Oilers, then returned to the Stars in 1949. In 1950, he played with the minor league Baltimore Orioles, then played for the minor league Milwaukee Brewers the next two seasons. In 1951, he was named the Most Valuable Player of the American Association, batting .293 with 17 home runs. In 1953, Unser returned to managing, serving as player-manager for the Austin Pioneers of the Big State League.

After splitting 1954 among three teams, he returned to the Cardinals organization as essentially a full-time manager and occasional player. While managing the Midwest League Decatur Commodores from 1955 to 1957, he appeared in just 11 and 7 games in the first two seasons, and just a single game in 1957. That year, Unser won his second league championship as a manager. In 1958, he managed the Winston-Salem Red Birds, then spent the next two seasons managing the Keokuk Cardinals. He made his last appearance as a player for Keokuk in 1961 at age 48. He managed one last season in the Milwaukee Braves farm system in 1962, taking the helm of the Boise Braves. He later served as a scout for the Braves and the Cleveland Indians.

Unser died at the age of 82 in Decatur, Illinois.
