= Chicota, Texas =

Unincorporated community in Texas, US

Coordinates: 33°52′08″N 95°34′16″W

Chicota is an unincorporated community in Lamar County, Texas, United States.

== Notable person ==
- Buck Frierson (1917–1996), longtime professional baseball player who played for the Cleveland Indians late in the 1941 season

== Education ==
The North Lamar Independent School District serves area students.
