= Abilene Blue Sox =

- 1946–1957; Abilene, Texas

Minor league affiliations
- Previous classes: Class B (1955–1957); Class C (1946–1954)
- League: Big State League (1956–1957)
- Previous leagues: West Texas–New Mexico League (1939, 1946–1955)

Major league affiliations
- Previous teams: Kansas City Athletics (1956–1957); Brooklyn Dodgers (1946–1948)

Team data
- Previous names: Abilene Apaches (1939); Abilene Blue Sox (1946–1957)
- Previous parks: Blue Sox Stadium

The Abilene Blue Sox were a minor league baseball team that operated in the West Texas–New Mexico League from 1946 to 1955 and the Big State League from 1956 to 1957. They were an affiliate of the Brooklyn Dodgers (1946–48) and the Kansas City Athletics (1956–57). The nickname came from the blue trim hose used by their Brooklyn parent team. The 1946 Abilene Blue Sox are considered one of the top 100 Minor League Baseball teams of all-time. Among the players who played for them was Al Silvera.
