= Prince Oana =

Hawaiian baseball player (1910–1976)

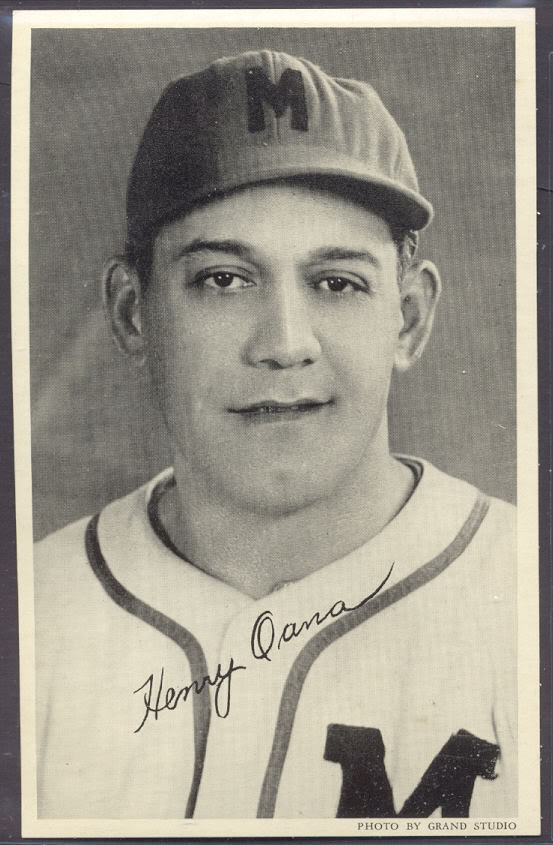
- 1943 Grand Studio baseball card of Oana
- Outfielder/Pitcher
- Born: January 22, 1910; Waipahu, Territory of Hawaii
- Died: June 19, 1976 (aged 66); Austin, Texas, U.S.
- Batted: Right Threw: Right

MLB debut
- April 22, 1934, for the Philadelphia Phillies

Last MLB appearance
- September 18, 1945, for the Detroit Tigers

MLB statistics
- Win–loss record: 3–2
- Batting average: .308
- Earned run average: 3.77
- Stats at Baseball Reference

Teams
- Philadelphia Phillies (1934); Detroit Tigers (1943, 1945)

Career highlights and awards
- World Series champion (1945)

Henry "Hank" Kawaihoa "Prince" Oana Jr. (January 22, 1910 – June 19, 1976) was a professional baseball player for 23 years from 1929 to 1951. He played portions of three seasons in Major League Baseball as an outfielder for the Philadelphia Phillies in 1934, and as a pinch hitter and pitcher for Detroit Tigers in 1943 and 1945. When Oana debuted with the Phillies, he became the fourth Hawaiian player to appear in the major leagues. He compiled a .308 batting average and a 3.77 earned run average (ERA) in three major league seasons.

Born in Hawaii, Oana played five sports in high school, and took up baseball professionally after he was noticed by Ty Cobb. He spent a few seasons in the minor leagues before joining the Phillies, who sent him back to the minors after six games in 1934. For the next decade, he played for various minor league teams, where his Hawaiian heritage proved to be both a selling point for teams and a hindrance to him making the majors, until the outbreak of World War II. Facing a shortage of active players, the Tigers signed him, and Oana played parts of 1943 and 1945 with the team. After 1945, he was sold to the Dallas Rebels, and he finished his professional career in 1951. He later operated a lakeside fishing business until his death in 1976.

== Early years ==
Oana was born at Waipahu, Hawaii, the site of the former Oahu Sugar Company plantation, in 1910. His , Henry Kawaihoa Oana Sr., was a Native Hawaiian from Waialua and an 1896 graduate of Kamehameha Schools, who later worked as a bookkeeper at the sugarcane plantation and as a station agent at the local railroad depot. His mother Mary was of Portuguese descent. His biological father was Manual "Kahuku" Rodrigues. Rodrigues was also a big island athlete.

Oana attended Saint Louis School in Honolulu where he had the nickname "Nutsky," and was "a five-sport star" in baseball, football, basketball, track and swimming. He was a running back in football and was twice (1926 and 1927) selected for the Interscholastic League of Honolulu all-star team.

== Baseball career ==
=== Pacific Coast League ===
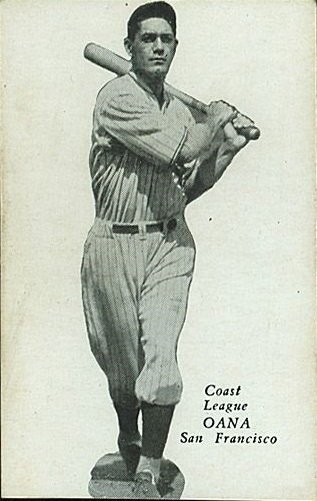
1932 Zeenuts PCL baseball card of Oana

In his youth, Oana played for a Hawaiian "Aratani" baseball team that went on a tour of Japan in 1928. While barnstorming in Japan, Ty Cobb saw Oana playing and suggested he play professionally in the United States, and recommended Oana to the San Francisco Seals of the Pacific Coast League. Oana heeded Cobb's advice and traveled to California in the winter of 1929 to try out with the Seals.

He spent the 1929 season with the Globe Bears, San Francisco's affiliate in the Class D Arizona State League. Oana compiled a .374 batting average with the Bears in his first year of professional play. He compiled a .413 average in 79 games for the Globe Bears at the start of the 1930 season, and was promoted to San Francisco. He joined the Seals organization with the ability to pitch or play in the infield or the outfield. Ultimately, "[h]e found himself as an outfielder being blessed with a powerful throwing arm, great speed and an ability to whack the ball to the far reaches of the parks."

Oana spent the next several seasons as an outfielder for the Seals (1929–1932) and the Portland Beavers (1933–1934), also in the Pacific Coast League. Oana compiled batting averages of .326 in 1930, .345 in 1931, and .332 in 1933. He also totaled 29 home runs, 63 doubles, and 11 triples in 686 at bats during the 1933 season, and led the Pacific Coast League with 163 RBIs.

=== Philadelphia Phillies ===
In November 1933, the Philadelphia Phillies acquired Oana from Portland in exchange for cash, Frank Ragland, Jimmy McLeod, and a player to be named later. Portland manager Spencer Abbott noted that the deal required the Phillies to pay "$2500 for a look" and $20,000 if he was retained for the years." Oana made his major league debut on April 22, 1934, becoming the fourth Hawaiian player to play Major League Baseball. He appeared in only six games for the Phillies, four as the starting left fielder. He compiled a .238 batting average with one double and three RBIs in 21 at bats. On May 1, 1934 the Phillies sent Oana back to Portland after less than 10 days in the big leagues.

=== Hawaiian heritage and nickname ===
Oana's Hawaiian heritage was both a selling point for Pacific Coast League promoters and a handicap in terms of Oana's ability to make it to the major leagues. When Oana signed with the San Francisco Seals, team owner Charlie Graham advertised Oana as "a Hawaiian prince." Graham claimed that, while vacationing in Honolulu, he discovered Oana playing baseball in bare feet. With the popularity of swimmer Duke Kahanamoku, The Sporting News noted: "If Kahanamoku, the great swimmer, could be listed as a duke, Graham figured Oana should be at least a prince." Portland manager Spencer Abbott also boasted that he was the one who had invested Oana "with the halo of Hawaiian royalty."

Oana's Hawaiian heritage was also a handicap in an era before racial integration of Major League Baseball. In January 1934, shortly after Oana had been acquired by the Phillies, The Sporting News wrote a feature story about Oana under the headline, "'Prince' Oana Pops Into the Big League Melting Pot: Adding Dash of Hawaii to Cuban and Indian Spice." Author Daniel M. Daniel offered Oana's promotion to the Phillies as evidence that, "while baseball is as American as America itself, it is also as cosmopolitan as our national population." Daniel wrote that, without going into the justice of the color line, the color line in baseball "is adhered to most strictly." Daniel wrote that, despite Oana's batting record, San Francisco owner Charlie Graham had difficulty selling Oana to a major league club, as some suggested that a full-blooded "Kanaka" may "not be welcome in the ranks of the big leagues." When the Seals signed Oana, he was rated as "an 'important money' prospect" who would likely draw five figures in a sale to a big league club.

To overcome the color line, Graham backed away from the story that Oana was a full-blooded Hawaiian prince and noted that Oana's mother was Portuguese. However, Graham could still not find a major league buyer for Oana. When Oana was acquired by the Phillies at the end of the 1933 season, The Sporting News published a front-page story referring to Oana as a "full-blooded Hawaiian" and a "dark-skinned islander" who "comes from the royal stock of the old Hawaiian dynasty that ruled the islands before the United States took over the country. Hence, the title of prince, which he wears proudly."

=== Atlanta Crackers ===
After his brief stint with the Phillies, Oana was returned to Portland and shortly thereafter sold to the Atlanta Crackers of the Southern Association. Spencer Abbott, who had previously managed Portland and was then the manager in Atlanta, offered to allow Portland to name its price for Oana. Abbott paid $5,000 for Oana and recalled Atlanta's racially segregated bleachers furthered the rationale for acquiring Oana:

At Atlanta we needed a powerful right-handed hitter who could hit the ball into those Negro bleachers in left field. We needed a hero for our colored citizens. Oana was the man.

Abbott agreed to fly Oana to Atlanta and asked him to dress sharply and wear a lei. Abbott arranged for press and photographers to meet Oana at the Atlanta airport. He later recalled: "I sold them on the Hawaiian royalty stuff. It was not far off the beam, either, for Hank comes from the best stock in the islands – and he looked like a prince, tall, dark and handsome." Oana spent most of the 1934 season with the Crackers, compiling a .289 batting average and 17 home runs in 480 at bats. Despite playing less than the full season in the Southern Association, he led the circuit in home runs and finished second in the league with 100 RBIs. Finding no interest from major league clubs after his 1934 season in Atlanta, Oana reportedly expressed interest in pursuing a career as a professional wrestler, with one account indicating that he hoped to "cash in" on his "wrestling experience on the island with Japanese grapplers."

=== Later 1930s ===
Oana spent the 1935 and 1936 seasons with the Syracuse Chiefs of the International League. He hit .300 with 21 doubles, 8 triples, and 12 home runs in 320 at bats during the 1935 season. Oana spent the 1937 season with Knoxville and Little Rock in the Southern Association, but an injury in Little Rock forced him to finish the season playing semipro ball in North Carolina. Oana next spent two years playing for the Jackson Senators in 1938 and 1939. In 1938, he hit .320 with 39 doubles and 26 home runs, and in 1939, he hit .323 with 20 doubles, 12 triples, and a career-high 39 home runs.

=== Conversion to pitcher at Ft. Worth ===
At the end of the 1939 season, the Jackson club sole Oana to the Fort Worth Cats in the Texas League. He continued to play as an outfielder for Fort Worth in 1940 and 1941. However, his offensive production dropped with batting averages of .264 in 1940 and .253 in 1941.

After the 1941 season, with his batting in decline, Oana worked as a pitcher during a barnstorming tour of Mexico. Rogers Hornsby took over as the manager at Fort Worth in 1942, and Oana badgered Hornsby for a chance as a pitcher. According to one account, Hornsby was reportedly prepared to release Oana, who was not hitting well, and said to Oana, "Hank, you hit like a pitcher," to which Oana replied, "I am a good pitcher." Hornsby initially thought that Oana was joking about being a pitcher, but finally relented and allowed him to pitch in relief one day in Houston. In Oana's first 76 innings as a pitcher in 1942, he compiled a 0.76 earned run average (ERA), threw 50 consecutive innings without an earned run, and pitched a no-hitter. In mid-July 1942, Oana's scoreless streak became national news, and resulted in a feature story in The Sporting News. In a total of 25 games as a pitcher during the 1942 season, Oana compiled a 16–5 record with a 1.72 ERA.

=== Detroit Tigers ===
In 1943, the Texas League disbanded due to the shortage of players during World War II. Oana was sold to the Milwaukee Brewers in February 1943, and he appeared in 20 games for that team. However, baseball commissioner Kenesaw Mountain Landis ruled that Oana was a free agent since the Texas League had disbanded. In late June 1943, Oana signed with the Detroit Tigers. In an introductory interview with the Detroit press, Oana had this to say about his supposed connection to Hawaiian royalty:

When I first joined the Seals, stories were published that I was a Hawaiian prince. The more I denied them, the more people believed them. I'm plain plain Henry Oana. Just call me Hank.

On July 3, 1943, Oana played a key role in a double-header sweep of the New York Yankees that Detroit general manager Jack Zeller said brought "the greatest thrills of any game he witnessed." In the second game of the double header, the Yankees led 5–2 in the third inning. Detroit manager Steve O'Neill brought in his newly acquired pitcher, Oana. O'Neill reportedly concluded that "the game was lost and so why waste his good pitchers." Oana gave up four more runs, and the Yankees led 9–3 after seven innings. Oana then held the Yankees scoreless in the eighth inning and hit a three-run home run in the bottom of the eighth inning. He held the Yankees scoreless again in the ninth inning, and the Tigers won the game with four runs in the bottom of the ninth. Oana was the winning pitcher and had his first major league home run in the same game. In all, Oana appeared in 10 games for the Tigers in 1943, all as a reliever, compiling a 3–2 record with a 4.50 ERA in 34 innings pitched. Oana also compiled a .385 batting average with two doubles, a triple, a home run, and seven RBIs in only 26 at bats for the 1943 Tigers.

Late in the 1943 season, Oana was returned to the Milwaukee Brewers, appearing in several games until he sustained a fractured wrist. In December 1943, the Brewers sold Oana to the Buffalo Bisons of the International League. Oana compiled a 13–13 record with a 3.63 ERA in 38 games for the Bisons in 1944. He also spent most of the 1945 season in Buffalo, compiling a 15–14 record (4.20 ERA) in 31 games.

In August 1945, on the recommendation of Buffalo manager Bucky Harris, the Tigers called him back up to the big leagues. With the Tigers were competing for the American League pennant, Oana appeared in three games, one as a starter. Oana compiled a 1.59 ERA in 11 innings for the 1945 Tigers team that won the pennant and the 1945 World Series. His only major league game as a starting pitcher was on September 12, 1945, against the Philadelphia Athletics: Oana allowed one hit through the first eight innings, pitched 10 2/3 innings and allowed only two runs, though the Tigers lost the game, 3–2, in the 16th inning.

=== Final years in the minors ===
After the 1945 season, Oana was sold to the Dallas Rebels of the Texas League. By July 1946, he was ranked among the league's top hitters and pitchers. He finished the 1946 season with a 24–10 record, a 2.54 ERA, a .303 batting average and seven home runs in 185 at bats.

Oana remained in Dallas for two years, 1946 and 1947. He then played three years as a player-manager for the Austin Pioneers of the Big State League from 1948 to 1950. He concluded his career as the player-manager for the Texarkana Bears in 1951. He ended his minor league career with a .304 batting average with 2,292 hits, including 428 doubles, 130 triples, and 261 home runs.

== Personal and later life ==
During his playing career, Oana developed a "reputation as a playboy," who "had too many extra-curricular activities." He was reported to have dressed like "a dandy", been "the Beau Brummel of baseball," and been idolized by fans for his "S-S appeal, socks and sex."

Oana was married multiple times. With his first wife, Arma Puninani Richardson, he had two sons, George (born 1928) and Henry (born 1929). On October 1, 1935, he was married to Joyce Powell of Winter Haven, Florida. By 1942, he had remarried to Patricial Hall of Atlanta. In 1946, he was reported to be happily married to a Texas girl. He also had at least two marriages late in life, in 1968 to a woman named Cynthia, and in 1974 to Opal Gunn. Spencer Abbott, Oana's minor league manager in Portland and Atlanta, recalled that Oana "worried hell out of me." According to Abbott, Oana had friends in every town, and "it was tough for him to live anything resembling a Spartan life." Abbott speculated that, despite having major league talent, Oana's lifestyle may have held him back from becoming a star in the major leagues. In 1946, Abbott opined: "If he had been a less handsome fellow with the same ability he might have been a ten-year star now in the major leagues."

Oana's baseball career ended in 1951, in part due to vision problems. In the spring of 1952, Oana underwent surgery in Austin, Texas, to remove cataracts from his right eye. He reportedly underwent eye surgery five times over the next 10 years and lived and worked during the late 1950s and early 1960s in a rehabilitation center for the blind in Austin, Texas. He worked there as an instructor teaching crafts to the totally blind. In 1965, the Associated Press reported that Oana's vision had returned and that he hoped to secure a job as a baseball coach, which would enable him to reimburse the Travis Association for the Blind for the assistance it provided while his vision was substantially lost due to cataracts in both eyes.

In his later years, Oana regained much of his vision and continued living in Austin, Texas. He operated a lakeside fishing business and was also a captain with the Travis County Sheriff's Department. Oana died of a heart attack in 1976 at his home in Austin, Texas at the age of 66, and was buried at the Oakwood Cemetery in Austin.
