= Salty Parker =

American baseball player and coach (1912–1992)

- Parker in 1936
- Infielder
- Born: July 8, 1912; East St. Louis, Illinois, U.S.
- Died: July 27, 1992 (aged 80); Houston, Texas, U.S.
- Batted: Right Threw: Right

MLB debut
- August 13, 1936, for the Detroit Tigers

Last MLB appearance
- September 16, 1936, for the Detroit Tigers

MLB statistics
- Batting average: .280
- Home runs: 0
- Runs batted in: 4
- Stats at Baseball Reference
- Managerial record at Baseball Reference

Teams
- As player: Detroit Tigers (1936); As coach: San Francisco Giants (1958–1961); Cleveland Indians (1962); Los Angeles/California Angels (1964–1967); New York Mets (1967); Houston Astros (1968–1972); California Angels (1973–1974); As manager: New York Mets (1967); Houston Astros (1972)

Francis James "Salty" Parker (July 8, 1912 – July 27, 1992) was an American professional baseball infielder, manager, and coach. He was part of organized baseball for 60 years.

Parker began playing in the minor leagues for the Moline Plowboys (1930–1932), Beaumont Exporters (1933–1934), and Toledo Mud Hens (1935–1936). He also appeared in 11 games in Major League Baseball as an infielder for the Detroit Tigers during the 1936 season. He sustained a shoulder injury in 1937, but continued playing in the minor leagues, including stints with the Indianapolis Indians (1937), Tulsa Oilers (1938), and Montreal Royals (1945).

Parker was also the manager for several minor league teams, including the Shreveport Sports (1941–1942, 1946–1951), Temple Eagles (1952–1953), Tyler Tigers (1954), El Dorado Oilers (1955), Danville Leafs (1956), Dallas Eagles (1957), and Cedar Rapids Giants (1976).

Parker was also a coach, scout, or instructor for the San Francisco Giants (1958–1961 and 1977–1985), Cleveland Indians (1962), Pittsburgh Pirates (1963), Los Angeles/California Angels (1964–1967 and 1973–1974), New York Mets (1967), Houston Astros (1968–1972), and Seattle Mariners (1986–1987). He also had brief stints as interim manager of the Mets for the final 11 games of the 1967 season and the Astros for one game in 1972. He was inducted into the Texas Baseball Hall of Fame in 1991.

== Early years ==
Parker was born in East St. Louis, Illinois, in 1912. As a boy, he worked at a store in East St. Louis; the store's owner gave him the nickname "Salty" due to his habit of eating the store's salted peanuts.

Parker's family later moved to Granite City, Illinois, where Parker played four years of high school baseball. He also played quarterback on the Granite City football team and forward on the basketball team and received all-conference honors in both sports. He also competed for the track team and received 15 major letters at Granite High School.

== Minor leagues (1930–1936) ==
Parker began his professional baseball career in 1930 with the Moline Plowboys of the Class D Mississippi Valley League. His uncle, Riley Parker, was manager of the Plowboys at the time. He spent three years with Moline from 1930 to 1932.

Parker joined the Beaumont Exporters of the Texas League in 1933. He was sold to the Detroit Tigers but then optioned back to Beaumont for the 1934 season.

In 1935, Parker joined the Toledo Mud Hens under option from the Tigers. He spent the 1935 season and the first half of the 1936 season with Toledo.

== Detroit Tigers (1936) ==
In July 1936, Parker was called up from Toledo to play for the Tigers. Shortly after joining the club, the team was invited to a dinner by an automobile company; Parker was one of only seven players to attend, each of whom received a new automobile. Manager Mickey Cochrane became enamored by Parker's work ethic, one profile noting:

Cochrane likes the boy, likes the way he plays, the way he hustles, the way he keeps busy during the day. In batting practice, you'll see him shagging flies or pitching to the regulars until his turn to bat comes around.

Parker appeared in his first major-league game on August 13, 1936, and appeared in 11 games, seven of which were at shortstop, collecting seven hits and four RBIs for a .280 batting average and a .333 on-base percentage.

== Minor leagues (1937–1939) ==
Parker was traded from the Tigers on December 2, 1936, to the Indianapolis Indians of the American Association, completing a deal that brought Dizzy Trout to the Tigers. Parker broke his shoulder mid-season in 1937.

In December 1937, Parker was sold to the Tulsa Oilers of the Texas League. After spending the first part of the 1938 season with Tulsa, he was sold to the Shreveport Sports in June 1938. He finished the 1938 season in Shreveport.

== Minor league manager ==
=== Lubbock and Marshall (1939–1940) ===
In April 1939, Parker was assigned to the Lubbock Hubbers of the West Texas–New Mexico League where he served as a field manager and shortstop. He led Marshall to the West Texas-New Mexico League championship.

In October 1939, Parker was drafted by the Marshall Tigers of the East Texas League. He served as Marshall's manager and shortstop in 1940. He led Marshall to the East Texas League championship. He also led the league with a career-high .349 batting average in 1940. He also compiled career highs in doubles (46) and slugging percentage in 1940.

=== Shreveport (1941–1942) ===
At the end of August 1940, the Shreveport Sports repurchased Parker's contract. (Marshall was a farm team for Shreveport at the time.) He was Shreveport's manager and shortstop in 1941 and led the Sports to a third-place finish in 1941. In 1942, he led Shreveport to the Texas League championship and a berth in the Dixie Series.

=== St. Paul (1943) ===
The Texas League disbanded in 1943 due to World War II. Parker and 16 other players were purchased by the St. Paul Saints of the American Association. He served as a player-manager for the 1943 St. Paul team. He appeared in 132 games as a player, compiling a .247 batting average and .323 on-base percentage with 51 RBIs and 57 runs scored.

=== Military service (1943–1944) ===
In December 1943, Parker was inducted into the Army. He missed the 1944 baseball season due to military service. He held the rank of private with the Headquarters Battery, 147th AA Battalion, Fort Bliss, Texas. He was given a medical discharge in November 1944 due to a leg injury received previously while playing baseball.

=== Montreal (1945) ===
In 1945, Parker played for the Montreal Royals of the International League. He compiled a .302 batting average and was selected as the league's all-star third baseman.

=== Shreveport (1946–1951) ===
In 1946, Parker returned to the Shreveport Sports as a player-manager. He held that dual job at Shreveport for six years from 1946 to 1951. His Shreveport teams finished in fifth place in 1947, four place in 1948 and 1949, seventh place in 1950, and eighth place in 1951. Parker resigned as manager at Shreveport in October 1951.

=== Temple (1952) ===
In December 1951, Parker was hired manager of the Temple Eagles of the Big State League. He remained with Temple during the 1952 and 1953 seasons. He also appeared in 23 games as a player in 1952, at age 40, and led the team to a first-place finish in the Big States League.

=== Tyler (1954) ===
In December 1953, Parker was hired as both general manager and field manager of the Tyler Tigers of the Big State League. Parker led the Tigers to a second-place finish in 1954 and a berth in playoffs.

=== El Dorado (1955) ===
In January 1955, Parker was hired as manager of the El Dorado Oilers of the Cotton States League. El Dorado was an affiliate of the New York Giants, and the 1955 season was Parker's first in the Giants organization. Parker led the 1955 El Dorado team to a second-place finish in the Cotton States League and tied for manager-of-the-year honors.

=== Danville (1956) ===
After the 1955 season, the Giants appointed Parker as the manager of the Class B Danville Leafs of the Carolina League. He led Danville to a third-place finish in the Carolina League and a berth in the playoffs.

=== Dallas (1957) ===
In October 1956, Parker was transferred by the Giants to manage his third team in three years, this time as the manager the Double-A Dallas Eagles of the Texas League for the 1956 season. He led the club to 102 wins and the Texas League pennant and was named manager of the year by the Texas League Baseball Writers Association.

== Major league coach and manager ==
=== Giants (1958–1961) ===
In December 1957, the Giants added Parker to their coaching staff. He was the club's third-base coach from 1958 to 1961. He resigned the position in October 1961 to accept a position with the Cleveland Indians.

=== Indians (1962) ===
In October 1961, Parker was hired as third-base coach for the Cleveland Indians. He joined longtime friend Mel McGaha who took over as the Indians' manager.

In December 1962, Parker was hired as a managerial consultant for the Pittsburgh Pirates' farm clubs.

=== Angels (1964–1966) ===
In October 1963, Parker was hired by the Los Angeles Angels. He rejoined manager Bill Rigney for whom he had previously coached with the Giants. He was the Angels' third-base coach from 1964 to 1966, during which time the team became the California Angels. In October 1966, the Angels fired four of their coaches, including Parker. He served as manager of the Santo Domingo team in the Dominican Republic league during the off-season between the 1966 and 1967 seasons.

=== New York Mets (1967) ===
Parker was hired as a coach by the New York Mets in November 1966, replacing Whitey Herzog as the club's third-base coach. When Wes Westrum resigned as the Mets' manager on September 21, 1967, Parker took over as interim manager for final 11 games of the season, compiling a 4–7 record.

=== Astros (1968–1972) ===
1972 photocard of Parker for Houston Astros

Parker was hired by the Houston Astros in October 1967 as the team's third-base coach. He held that post through the 1972 season. On August 26, 1972, he led the Astros to a victory as interim head coach in between the tenures of Harry Walker and Leo Durocher. In early October 1972, Durocher fired Parker.

=== Angels (1973–1974) ===
Parker returned to the California Angels in November 1972 as their third base coach. Dick Williams took over as the Angels' manager in late June 1974, and Parker was not asked to return to the club for the 1975 season.

=== Giants (1976–1985) ===
Parker returned to the San Francisco Giants in 1976 and was assigned as manager of the Class-A Cedar Rapids Giants. He led Cedar Rapids to the league's division championship and won the league's manager-of-the-year award. He then worked as the Giants' minor league infield instructor from 1977 to 1985. Interviewed in 1983, Parker described his lifelong love of baseball: "It's a beautiful disease, that's the best way to describe it. I'll never be able to get it out of my system."

=== Mariners (1986–1987) ===
In 1986, Parker was hired by the Seattle Mariners. He was a roving minor league instructor in 1986. In 1987, at age 74, he was a coach for the Bellingham Mariners, working mainly with the infielders.

== Family and later years ==
Parker married his grade-school sweetheart, Thelma Millard, in the fall of 1936. They had three daughters: Jean, Nancy, and Frances.

Parker's wife died in February 1991.

Parker was inducted into the Texas Baseball Hall of Fame in 1991. He died of cancer in August 1992 at age 80 in Houston.

== Managerial record ==
Team	From	To	Regular season record			Post–season record		
Team	From	To	W	L	Win %	W	L	Win %
New York Mets	1967	1967	4	7	.364	—		
Houston Astros	1972	1972	1	0	1.000	—		
Total			5	7	.417	0	0	–
Source: Baseball Reference
