= Tyler East Texans =

The Tyler East Texans were a minor league baseball team that played in the Big State League from 1951 to 1953. It was based in the United States city of Tyler, Texas.

Under manager Bill Capps in 1952, the team won the league championship. It reached the league finals in 1953, but lost the series.

== Major league players ==
Numerous players with major league experience played for the club.

=== 1951 ===
- Merv Connors
- Hal Epps
- Joe Kracher (also managed the club)
- Tony Ordenana
- Bill Reeder

=== 1952 ===
- Hal Epps
- Red Murff

=== 1953 ===
- Jim Kirby
- Hank Wyse
