= Sherman–Denison Twins =

American minor league baseball franchise

The Sherman–Denison Twins were a minor league baseball team representing the Texas cities of Sherman and Denison, which played in the Big State League (1947–1951) and Sooner State League (1953).

== History ==
The team was affiliated with the Washington Senators in 1948, the same year they were Big State League champions under manager José Rodríguez.

Notable players include Bill Atwood, Larry Drake, Buck Frierson, John Whitehead, Pete Appleton, Willy Miranda, Baby Ortiz, Freddy Rodríguez, Joe Smaza, Lindsay Brown, Luis Suarez, Izzy Leon, Monty Stratton, Vicente Amor, Buzz Dozier, Roy Hawes and Buddy Lively. Whitehead, Appleton, Brown and Atwood managed the team as well.
