= Harry Davis (1930s first baseman) =

American baseball player (1908–1997)

- First baseman
- Born: March 7, 1908; Shreveport, Louisiana, U.S.
- Died: March 3, 1997 (aged 88); Shreveport, Louisiana, U.S.
- Batted: Left Threw: Left

MLB debut
- April 13, 1932, for the Detroit Tigers

Last MLB appearance
- October 2, 1937, for the St. Louis Browns

MLB statistics
- Batting average: .264
- Home runs: 7
- Runs batted in: 123
- Stats at Baseball Reference

Teams
- Detroit Tigers (1932–1933); St. Louis Browns (1937)

Harry Albert Davis Jr. (March 7, 1908 – March 3, 1997), (Note: Some sources list his date of birth as March 7, 1908.) nicknamed "Stinky", was an American professional baseball first baseman. His playing career spanned 26 seasons from 1925 to 1950, including three seasons in Major League Baseball (MLB) with the Detroit Tigers (1932–1933) and St. Louis Browns (1937).

== Early years ==
Davis was born in 1908 in Shreveport, Louisiana. He attended C. E. Byrd High School and then Centenary College.

== Professional baseball ==
Davis began his professional baseball career playing for the Shamokin Shammies of the New York-Pennsylvania League from 1925 to 1927. He joined the Syracuse Stars of the same league in 1928. He next played for the Toronto Maple Leafs of the International League from 1929 to 1931.

Davis was the Detroit Tigers' starting first baseman for 141 games in 1932. For the season, he had a .269 batting average with a .339 on-base percentage (OBP), 92 runs scored, 159 hits, and 74 runs batted in (RBIs). The following year, Davis lost his starting job to future Hall of Fame inductee Hank Greenberg, as Davis made 40 starts at first base while Greenberg made 115. Davis' batting average fell to .214 with a .303 OBP and 14 RBIs in a total of 66 appearances.

After leaving the Tigers, Davis returned to the minor leagues, playing for Toledo Mud Hens of the American Association in 1934, the Portland Beavers of the Pacific Coast League in 1935, and Toledo again in 1936. He batted .317, .314, and .298 during those three seasons, respectively.

Davis was acquired from Toledo by the St. Louis Browns in September 1936, in exchange for a player to be named later; the Browns later completed the trade by sending outfielder Ed Coleman to the Mud Hens. Davis returned to the major leagues with the Browns in 1937; he played in 120 games and hit .276 with a .374 OBP and 35 RBIs. In December 1937, the Browns traded Davis to the New York Yankees for pitcher Vito Tamulis. Davis spent the 1938 season with the Yankees' Double-A affiliate, the Kansas City Blues, posting a .299 average.

Davis continued playing in the minor leagues for 12 more seasons, including stints with the Rochester Red Wings (1939–1942), Columbus Red Birds (1942), Toronto Maple Leafs (1943–1946), Williamsport Grays (1946), Greenville Majors (1947), Marshall Tigers (1948), Gadsden Pilots (1948–1949), and Amarillo Gold Sox (1950).

For his career, Davis appeared in 327 major-league games (batting .264) and 2916 minor-league games (batting .292). He also served as a player-manager for parts of five minor-league seasons, during 1945–1948 and 1950.

== Personal life ==
After his playing career ended, Davis worked for the Kansas City Southern Railway and the Williams P&S.

Davis married Cordie Evelyn Douglass in 1928. He died in March 1997.
