= Paris Red Peppers =

The Paris Red Peppers Minor League Baseball team played in the East Texas League in 1946 and the Big State League In 1947. The Peppers were based in the United States city of Paris, Texas, and were affiliated with the St. Louis Browns of the American League.

The name Red Peppers was picked from a name-the-team-contest. Emblems featuring red pepper pods were quickly designed and placed on home jerseys. There were 100 suggestions sent to the club that was returning pro ball to town for the first time since 1934. The winner was Lee Johnson and he received two season passes. The road jerseys were gray with the city name in block letters stretched across the front. A block P would be worn on a dark blue cap.

Frank Sacka, Bob Prichard, Pat McLaughlin and Homer Peel played for the team in 1946. Peel also managed the club. Eddie Carnett, Frank Carswell and Jim Walkup were with the team in 1947. The club was managed by Lloyd Rigby in that season.

== See also ==
- Paris Rockets
