= Tyler Tigers =

The Tyler Tigers were a Big State League baseball team based in Tyler, Texas, US, that played from 1954 to 1955 as members of the Big State League. They were managed by future major league manager Salty Parker in their inaugural season, reaching the playoffs only to lose in the first round. Other highlights from the 1954 season include a perfect game tossed by pitcher Gale Pringle against the Temple Eagles.

They did not complete the 1955 season, as they dropped out of the League – the second squad to do so that season, following the Galveston White Caps. They played their final game of the season on June 29. Team owner J. C. Stroud cited poor attendance, personal ailing health and external pressure from other clubs to shut down the Tyler ball club as the impetuses for the team's dropping out.

Major league pitcher Lou Lombardo spent part of the 1954 season with the team, going 1–2 in six games. He appeared in the big leagues in 1948, pitching for the New York Giants.

The team's games were announced by KTBB.
