= Texarkana Bears =

The Texarkana Bears minor league baseball team played in the East Texas League in 1947 and the Big State League from 1947 to 1953. It was based in the American city of Texarkana, Texas. It was affiliated with the Chicago White Sox in 1946.

In 1947, under manager George Washington, the club won the Big State League championships. It again won the championship in 1950, under manager George Archie.

== Major league alumni ==
- Vicente Amor
- Red Borom
- Frank Carswell
- Buzz Dozier
- Vallie Eaves
- Al Gerheauser
- Len Gilmore
- Warren Hacker
- Joe Kracher
- George Milstead
- Prince Oana
- Jennings Poindexter
- Pete Runnels
- Pat Scantlebury
- Floyd Speer
- Joe Szekely
- George Washington
- Ray Yochim
- Tony York
