= Victoria Rosebuds =

- 1910–1977; (1910–1911, 1926, 1956–1961, 1974, 1976–1977); Victoria, Texas

Minor league affiliations
- Previous classes: Class A (1976–1977); Class AA (1958–1961); Class B (1956–1957); Class D (1910–1911, 1926)
- League: Lone Star League (1977)
- Previous leagues: Gulf States League (1976); Texas League (1958–1961); Big State League (1956–1957); Gulf Coast League (1926); Southwest Texas League (1910–1911)

Major league affiliations
- Previous teams: Baltimore Orioles (1961); Detroit Tigers (1960); Brooklyn/Los Angeles Dodgers (1957–1959)

Minor league titles
- League titles (3): 1926; 1957; 1959

Team data
- Previous names: Victoria Rosebuds (1977); Victoria Cowboys (1976); Victoria Rosebuds (1957–1961); Victoria Eagles (1956); Victoria Rosebuds (1910–1911)
- Previous parks: Riverside Park; Toro Stadium; Cardinal Park

The Victoria Rosebuds were a minor league baseball team in the Double-A Texas League located in Victoria, Texas, between 1958 and 1961

== History ==
On May 27, 1961, the club was transferred to Ardmore, Oklahoma, because of attendance woes. Club owner Tom O'Connor, Jr., a local rancher, suffered a heart attack in 1961, and without his continued support, the team was unable to remain in Victoria. Two weeks later, on June 10, 1961, Victoria received another club struggling at the gate, the Rio Grande Valley Giants, who transferred from Harlingen, Texas. The Rosebuds had originally moved to Victoria from Shreveport, Louisiana, after the 1957 season.

Both the Ardmore Rosebuds (who drew a total of almost 49,000 fans for the season) and Victoria Giants (a total of 43,000) disappeared from the TL map in 1962, succeeded by the Albuquerque Dukes and El Paso Sun Kings.

Several other minor league teams also called themselves the Victoria Rosebuds, including teams in the Southwest Texas League from 1910 to 1911, the original Gulf Coast League in 1926, the Big State League in 1957, and the Lone Star League in 1977.

However, the Rosebuds/Giants' four years in the Texas League during the 1958 to 1961 period (along with a return to the Texas loop in 1974 for one season as the Victoria Toros) represented the highest-level minor league team to represent the city. Victoria has always been by far the smallest market base in its respective leagues. The Texas League Rosebuds competed in a league against Houston and Dallas, with less than 20,000 inhabitants in Victoria. In 1910, the city supported the Rosebuds with a population of less than 5,000.

The Rosebuds' most successful season was in 1959, when they won the TL's regular-season championship before falling in the playoffs to the San Antonio Missions. The team was managed by "Pistol Pete" Reiser, the former star Dodger centerfielder, who won the 1959 Texas League Manager of the Year Award and The Sporting News Minor League Manager of the Year Award for his efforts. Outfielder Carl Warwick, a future major-leaguer, was the league Most Valuable Player, while Carroll Beringer, later a long-time MLB coach, was the TL's Pitcher of the Year.

A number of major league stars advanced from the Rosebuds, including Frank Howard and Tommy Davis

In 1977, Victoria was represented in the Class A Lone Star League by a team nicknamed the Rosebuds. Although the team finished under .500, at 38–42, the Rosebuds compiled the best overall record in the league's North Division and drew 14,000 fans. The league lasted only that one campaign before disbanding.

The Rosebuds played their games in Riverside Stadium, which was built in 1946. Riverside Stadium is still in use by the Victoria Generals in the Texas Collegiate League and by Texas A&M University–Victoria Jaguars.

== Notable Victoria alumni ==
- Tommy Davis (1958) 3 x MLB All-Star; 2 x NL batting title (1962–1963)
- Nino Espinosa (1974)
- Frank Howard (1959) 4 x MLB All-Star; 2 x AL home run leader (1968, 1970); 1970 AL RBI leader; 1960 NL Rookie of the Year
- Byron McLaughlin (1976)
- Dave McNally (1961) 3 x MLB All-Star
- Johnny Pesky (1960, MGR) MLB All-Star
- Pete Reiser (1959, MGR) 3 x MLB All-Star; 1941 NL batting title
- Pete Ward (1961)
