= Mike Roarke =

American baseball player and coach (1930–2019)

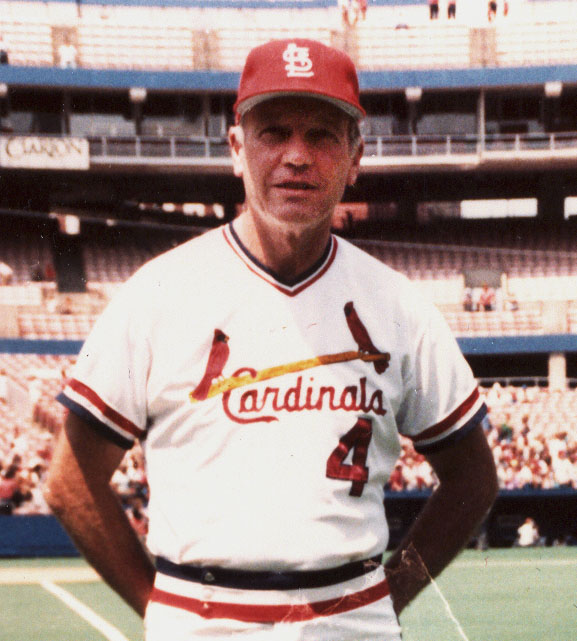
- Roarke as the Cardinals' pitching coach in 1988
- Catcher
- Born: November 8, 1930; West Warwick, Rhode Island, U.S.
- Died: July 27, 2019 (aged 88); West Warwick, Rhode Island, U.S.
- Batted: Right Threw: Right

MLB debut
- April 19, 1961, for the Detroit Tigers

Last MLB appearance
- October 3, 1964, for the Detroit Tigers

MLB statistics
- Batting average: .230
- Home runs: 6
- Runs batted in: 44
- Stats at Baseball Reference

Teams
- As player: Detroit Tigers (1961–1964); As coach: Detroit Tigers (1965–1966); California Angels (1967–1969); Detroit Tigers (1970); Chicago Cubs (1978–1980); St. Louis Cardinals (1984–1990); San Diego Padres (1991–1993); Boston Red Sox (1994)

Michael Thomas Roarke (November 8, 1930 – July 27, 2019) was an American catcher and coach in Major League Baseball. During his playing days he threw and batted right-handed, stood 6 feet 2 inches (1.88 m) tall and weighed 195 pounds (88 kg).

Roarke was born in West Warwick, Rhode Island, where he graduated from West Warwick High School in 1948. He earned a B.Sc. degree in history at Boston College, and served as captain of the Eagles' football and baseball teams. He won the Scanlan Award in 1951 for outstanding ability in scholarship, leadership, and athletic ability.

== Minor-league apprenticeship ==
Like his college teammate, future MLB utilityman and manager Joe Morgan, Roarke signed with the local National League club, the Boston Braves, in 1952. After a brief stint with the Braves' Evansville farm club in the Class B Three-I League, Roarke entered the military, effectively delaying his professional debut until 1954.

Known as a good handler of pitchers and an excellent defensive catcher, Roarke struggled as a hitter, eclipsing a .250 batting average only three times in his seven-year minor league career. The Braves, who had moved to Milwaukee just before the 1953 season, employed one of the best and most durable catchers of the 1950s, eleven-time National League All-Star Del Crandall, and were also one of the era's deepest and strongest Major League clubs. They never called Roarke up from Triple-A.

== Tigers' second-string catcher ==
After the 1959 season, Roarke was traded to the Detroit Tigers in a deal that included Charley Lau. He toiled one further season, 1960, in the minors (with the Denver Bears of the American Association) before finally making his Major League debut with the Tigers at age 30 on April 19, 1961. He spent four seasons (1961–64) as Detroit's second-string receiver, working behind Dick Brown, Gus Triandos and Bill Freehan. In 194 total games, Roarke batted .230 with six home runs and 44 runs batted in.

== Bullpen and pitching coach ==
He retired as an active player on October 9, 1964, to become a bullpen coach with the Tigers (1965–66) and California Angels (1967–69). Roarke then transitioned from bullpen coach to pitching coach—one of the handful of former catchers who excelled at coaching a pitching staff. He returned to the Tigers in 1970 as the replacement for high-profile mound tutor Johnny Sain for one season.

Then, after a seven-year stint (1971–77) as a minor league manager and roving minor league pitching instructor, Roarke served as a pitching coach for the Chicago Cubs, St. Louis Cardinals (where he worked on two NL pennant winners—1985 and 1987—under Whitey Herzog), San Diego Padres and Boston Red Sox, retiring after the strike-shortened 1994 season. He also spent three seasons in his native Rhode Island as pitching coach of the 1981–83 Pawtucket Red Sox of the International League, working with his old college classmate, Morgan, during his first two years with Pawtucket.

He died on July 27, 2019, in West Warwick.

== See also ==
- List of St. Louis Cardinals coaches

Preceded by Wayne Blackburn	Detroit Tigers Bullpen Coach; 1965–1966	Succeeded by Hal Naragon
Preceded by Jack Paepke	California Angels Bullpen Coach; 1967–1969	Succeeded by Norm Sherry
Preceded by Johnny Sain	Detroit Tigers Pitching Coach; 1970	Succeeded by Art Fowler
Preceded by Barney Schultz	Chicago Cubs Pitching Coach; 1978–1980	Succeeded by Les Moss
Preceded by Hub Kittle	St. Louis Cardinals Pitching Coach; 1984–1990	Succeeded by Joe Coleman
Preceded by Pat Dobson	San Diego Padres Pitching Coach; 1991–1993	Succeeded by Sonny Siebert
Preceded by Rich Gale	Boston Red Sox Pitching Coach; 1994	Succeeded by John Cumberland
