= Gary Gearhart =

American baseball player (1923-2001)

- Outfielder
- Born: August 10, 1923; New Lebanon, Ohio, U.S.
- Died: April 2, 2001 (aged 77); Dayton, Ohio, U.S.
- Batted: Right Threw: Left

MLB debut
- April 18, 1947, for the New York Giants

Last MLB appearance
- September 27, 1947, for the New York Giants

MLB statistics
- Batting average: .246
- Home runs: 6
- Runs batted in: 17
- Stats at Baseball Reference

Teams
- New York Giants (1947)

Lloyd William "Gary" Gearhart (August 10, 1923 – April 2, 2001) was an American Major League Baseball outfielder who played for the New York Giants in 1947.

Gearhart began his professional career in 1944, playing in the minor leagues until 1946. On April 18, 1947, he made his major league debut at the age of 23. Playing against the Brooklyn Dodgers, Gearhart went 1-for-2 with two walks in his first big league match. Used as a bench player for most of the season, Gearhart hit .246 with six home runs and 17 RBI in 179 at-bats (73 games). Despite being the Giants' most used reserve in 1947, Gearhart appeared in his final big league game on September 28. In October 1948, he was traded to the Atlanta Crackers of the Southern Association with Dick Wheeler and $60,000 for Davey Williams.

Following his single season in the majors, Gearhart played in the minor leagues from 1948 to 1954 and again in 1956, hitting .298 with 981 hits in his 11-year career at that level. He later managed the Port Arthur Sea Hawks (1956) and Marion Mets (1968), both minor league teams. Gearhart served as Chief Scout for Ohio, Kentucky, West Virginia, and East Indiana for the New York Mets for thirteen seasons and was awarded a World Series Ring for the 1969 Mets World Series championship.

After retiring from baseball, Gearhart became Director of Parks and Recreation for the city of Xenia, Ohio from 1957 to 1967. Gearhart died in Dayton, Ohio on April 2, 2001.
