= Red Davis =

American baseball player (1915-2002)

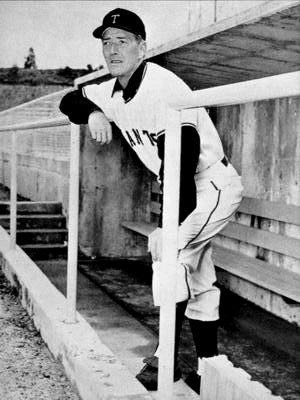
- Third baseman
- Born: July 15, 1915; Wilkes-Barre, Pennsylvania, U.S.
- Died: April 26, 2002 (aged 86); Laurel, Mississippi, U.S.
- Batted: Right Threw: Right

MLB debut
- September 9, 1941, for the New York Giants

Last MLB appearance
- September 28, 1941, for the New York Giants

MLB statistics
- Batting average: .214
- Home runs: 0
- Runs batted in: 5
- Hits: 15
- Stats at Baseball Reference

Teams
- New York Giants (1941)

John Humphrey "Red" Davis (July 15, 1915 – April 26, 2002) was an American third baseman in Major League Baseball and a longtime manager in the minor leagues. Born in Wilkes-Barre, Pennsylvania, Davis threw and batted right-handed, stood 5 ft 11 in (180 cm) tall and weighed 172 pounds (78 kg).

Davis' major league career consisted of 21 games and 70 at bats during September 1941 as a member of the New York Giants. He collected 15 hits, with three doubles and five runs batted in, for a batting average of .214.

Davis made a more indelible imprint as a minor league skipper, logging 27 years (1949–72; 1974–76) in the farm systems of the Giants, Cincinnati Reds, Cleveland Indians and Pittsburgh Pirates, and working at all levels of the minors. He managed at Triple-A with the Minneapolis Millers, Phoenix/Tacoma Giants, Buffalo Bisons, Portland Beavers, Charleston Charlies and Oklahoma City 89ers. His teams won 1,993 games, losing 1,927 (.508) with four league championships.

He died in Laurel, Mississippi, at age 86.

Preceded by Eddie Stanky	Minneapolis Millers manager 1957	Succeeded by Gene Mauch
Preceded by Franchise established	Phoenix Giants manager 1958–1959	Succeeded by Franchise transferred
Preceded by Franchise established	Tacoma Giants manager 1960–1962	Succeeded by Andy Gilbert
Preceded by Kerby Farrell	Buffalo Bisons manager 1966	Succeeded by Lou Fitzgerald
Preceded by Johnny Lipon	Portland Beavers manager 1968–1969	Succeeded by Al Federoff
Preceded by Joe Morgan	Charleston Charlies manager 1972	Succeeded by Joe Morgan
Preceded by Frank Lucchesi	Oklahoma City 89ers manager 1974–1975	Succeeded by Jim Bunning
