= The Stratton Story =

1949 film by Sam Wood

- 1949 theatrical poster
- Directed by: Sam Wood
- Screenplay by: Guy Trosper; Douglas Morrow
- Story by: Douglas Morrow
- Produced by: Jack Cummings
- Starring: James Stewart; June Allyson; Frank Morgan; Agnes Moorehead; Bill Williams
- Cinematography: Harold Rosson
- Edited by: Ben Lewis
- Music by: Adolph Deutsch
- Production company: Metro-Goldwyn-Mayer
- Distributed by: Metro-Goldwyn-Mayer
- Release date: May 12, 1949
- Running time: 106 minutes
- Country: United States
- Language: English
- Budget: $1,771,000
- Box office: $4,488,000

The Stratton Story is a 1949 American biographical film directed by Sam Wood that tells the true story of Monty Stratton, a Major League Baseball pitcher who pitched for the Chicago White Sox from 1934 to 1938. The film is the first of three to pair stars Jimmy Stewart and June Allyson, followed by The Glenn Miller Story and Strategic Air Command. Stratton commented that Stewart "did a great job of playing me, in a picture which I figure was about as true to life as they could make it."

The Stratton Story was a financial success and won the Academy Award for Best Motion Picture Story.

== Plot ==
Texas farm boy Monty Stratton demonstrates a knack for pitching a baseball. With the help of Barney Wile, a retired catcher who is now a scout, he manages to arrange a tryout with the Chicago White Sox during the team's spring training in California. He shows promise and is given a contract.

On his first evening at spring training, Stratton is introduced to a young woman named Ethel. They start dating and fall in love, but Stratton must leave Ethel to travel to Chicago. When he is sent down to a minor league team, he proposes marriage. He is called back up to the White Sox and returns to Chicago with his newlywed bride, and by the end of the season, they are expecting a child.

The next season, Stratton is pitching during a road game and cannot focus because he is thinking of his wife giving birth in Chicago. When he is notified that he has a son, he throws a wild pitch and is pulled from the game smiling.

As his career progresses, Stratton improves so much that he is voted an All-Star in the American League. In the offseason of 1938, he accidentally shoots himself in the right leg while hunting on his farm in Texas. When his leg must be amputated, it appears as though his pitching career is over and he enters a very dark, brooding period. Nevertheless, with the support of his wife and a wooden leg, Stratton learns to walk along with his baby boy. He works hard and starts practicing his pitching again. He makes an inspirational, successful minor-league comeback in 1946.

== Cast ==
- James Stewart as Monty Stratton
- June Allyson as Ethel
- Frank Morgan as Barney Wile
- Agnes Moorehead as Ma Stratton
- Bill Williams as Eddie Dibson
- Bruce Cowling as Ted Lyons
- Cliff Clark as Josh Higgins
- Mary Lawrence as Dot
- Dean White as Luke Appling
- Robert Gist as Earnie
- Gene Bearden as Himself
- Bill Dickey as Himself
- Jimmy Dykes as Himself
- Mervyn "Merv" Shea as Himself

Agnes Moorehead, who played the role of Monty Stratton's mother, was only seven years James Stewart's senior.

Warner Bros. contract player Ronald Reagan sought the title role, but the studio refused to lend him to MGM because it believed that the film would be a failure.

Van Johnson was announced at one stage to play the lead.

== Historical inaccuracy ==
The movie indicates that Stratton's debut for the Chicago White Sox was part of a catastrophic 16–0 loss to the New York Yankees. However, Stratton's MLB debut occurred on Saturday, June 2, 1934, in a White Sox home game at Comiskey Park versus the Detroit Tigers. Detroit already held a 10–0 lead and had two runners on base when Stratton entered the game in relief with two outs in the sixth inning. Stratton retired the Tigers in that inning without any further runs scored. During the game's three final innings, Stratton allowed two more runs (both earned) on four hits as the Tigers won 12–0. It was Stratton's only major-league appearance of the 1934 season.

== Production ==
Scenes were staged at various baseball parks, including:

- Brookside Park in Pasadena, a spring training site for the White Sox
- Comiskey Park in Chicago, the home field of Stratton's team, the White Sox
- Gilmore Field, the home of the Hollywood Stars of the Pacific Coast League, used in the final scenes of the film that were set in Texas
- Wrigley Field (Los Angeles)

Stock footage was used to depict several other American League baseball parks in establishing shots.

== Reception ==
According to MGM records, the film earned $3,831,000 in the U.S. and Canada and $657,000 overseas, resulting in a profit of $1,211,000. It was one of the most popular films of the year.

== Radio adaptation ==
The story was adapted for a one-hour CBS Lux Radio Theatre episode broadcast on February 13, 1950, that was entitled "The Stratton Story." Stewart and Allyson repeated their roles for the program.

== See also ==
- List of baseball films
