= Clem Hausmann =

American baseball player (1919–1972)

- Pitcher
- Born: August 17, 1919; Houston, Texas, U.S.
- Died: August 29, 1972 (aged 53); Baytown, Texas, U.S.
- Batted: Right Threw: Right

MLB debut
- April 28, 1944, for the Boston Red Sox

Last MLB appearance
- April 27, 1949, for the Philadelphia Athletics

MLB statistics
- Win–loss record: 9–14
- Earned run average: 4.21
- Strikeouts: 73
- Stats at Baseball Reference

Teams
- Boston Red Sox (1944–1945); Philadelphia Athletics (1949)

Clemens Raymond Hausmann (August 17, 1919 – August 29, 1972) was an American professional baseball pitcher. He played in Major League Baseball (MLB) from 1944 and 1949 for the Boston Red Sox (1944–1945) and Philadelphia Athletics (1949).

In a three-season career, Hausmann posted a 9–14 record with 73 strikeouts and a 4.21 ERA in 64 appearances, including 25 starts, seven complete games, two shutouts, 20 games finished, four saves, and 263.0 innings of work.

Hausmann died in Baytown, Texas at age 53.

== Sources ==
- Career statistics from Baseball Reference · Retrosheet · Baseball Almanac
- Retrosheet
