= Buddy Hancken =

American baseball player (1914-2007)

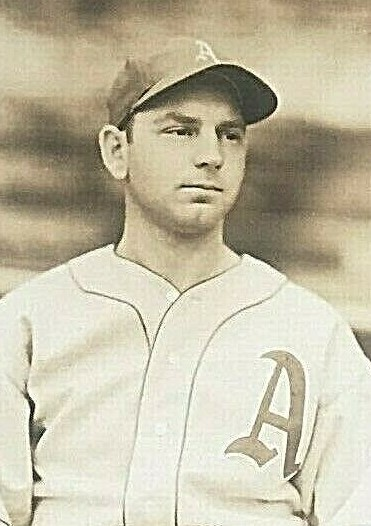
- Catcher
- Born: August 30, 1914; Birmingham, Alabama, U.S.
- Died: February 15, 2007 (aged 92); Orange, Texas, U.S.
- Batted: Right Threw: Right

MLB debut
- May 14, 1940, for the Philadelphia Athletics

Last MLB appearance
- May 14, 1940, for the Philadelphia Athletics

MLB statistics
- Games played: 1
- Plate appearances: 0
- Total chances: 1
- Stats at Baseball Reference

Teams
- Philadelphia Athletics (1940)

Morris Medlock "Buddy" Hancken (August 30, 1914 – February 15, 2007) was an American catcher in Major League Baseball who played during the 1940 season. Hancken batted and threw right-handed. He was born in Birmingham, Alabama.

Hancken spent seven decades in professional baseball as a player, manager, coach, scout, and executive. He began his career in the minor leagues in the late 1930s with the Toledo Mud Hens and Seattle Rainiers. Then reached the Majors when manager Connie Mack knew he could catch knuckleballs and wanted him as the fourth catcher for the Philadelphia Athletics. Hancken played his only Major League game on May 14, 1940, getting a putout in the field, but he never had a chance to bat. Unfortunately, Mack sent his two knuckleballers to the minors and Hancken became expendable.

From 1942 to 1946 Hancken served in the United States Marines during World War II, but he would not leave baseball behind forever. He managed ten different minor league teams, spent time as a scout for several clubs, and served as a bench coach for the Houston Astros from 1968 through 1972. He then joined the Astros front office staff in 1971 and 1991–92, being recognized as a mentor to players like Enos Cabell, Larry Dierker and Art Howe.

Hancken died in Orange, Texas at the age of 92. At the time of his death, he was one of the oldest living former major leaguers.

== Quote ==
- Elected to the Texas Baseball Hall of Fame in 1994, Hancken best described his career in one statement. "I got to play one inning as a catcher, make one putout, meet Connie Mack and shake hands with Babe Ruth and Ty Cobb." His friend, Bill McCurdy (The Encyclopedia of Minor League Baseball), responded him with a reference to the popular baseball movie Field of Dreams: "That's OK, Buddy, at least you got your hands on the ball. Moonlight Graham never did".

== Sources ==
- Baseball Reference
- The Orange Leader - Jason Rollinson article
