= George Archie =

American baseball player (1914–2001)

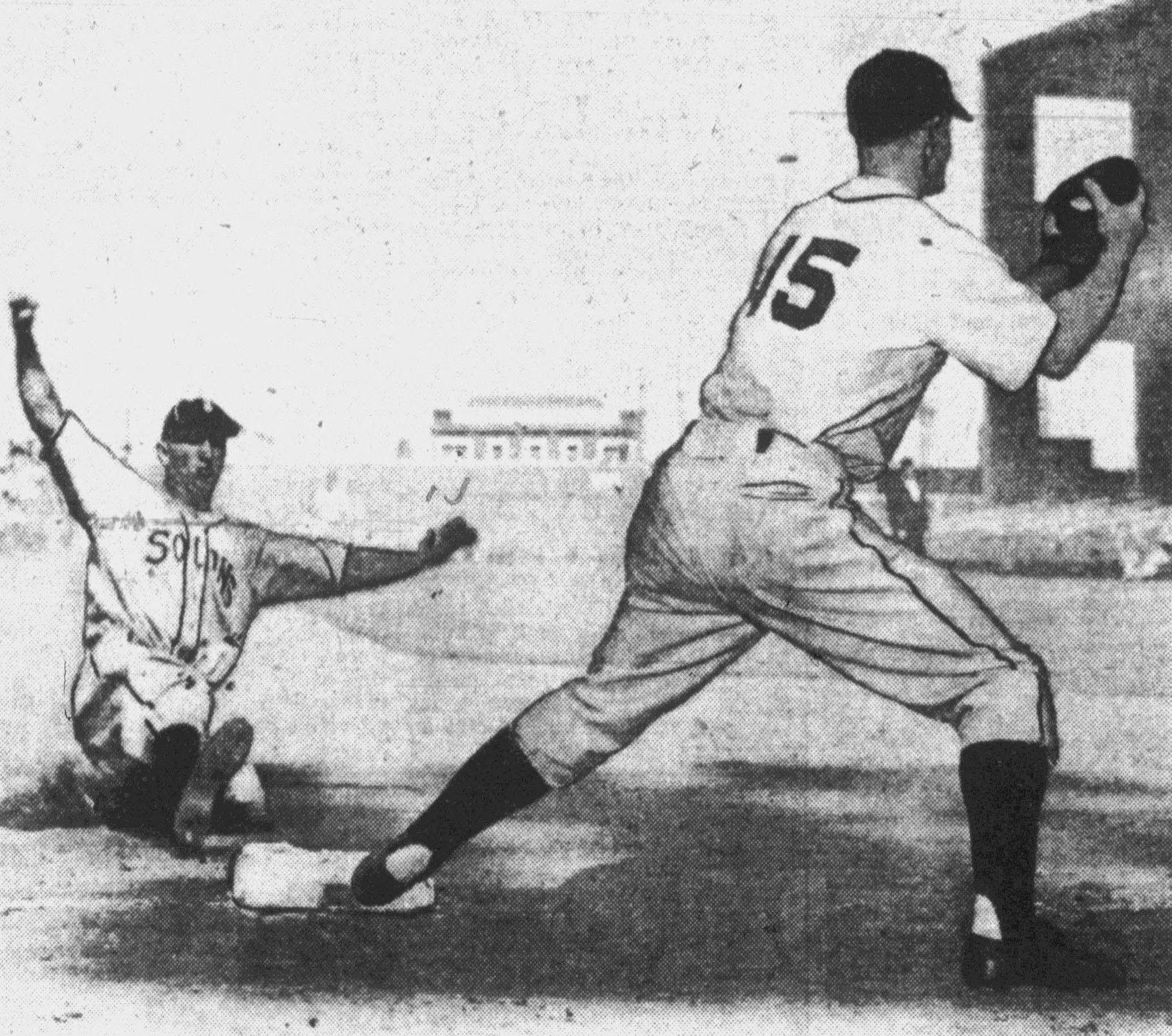
- Archie (right) anticipates the throw as Sacramento Solons player Gene Corbett (left) slides safely into third base.
- Third baseman / First baseman
- Born: April 27, 1914; Nashville, Tennessee, U.S.
- Died: September 20, 2001 (aged 87); Nashville, Tennessee, U.S.
- Batted: Right Threw: Right

MLB debut
- September 14, 1938, for the Detroit Tigers

Last MLB appearance
- April 21, 1946, for the St. Louis Browns

MLB statistics
- Batting average: .273
- Home runs: 3
- Runs batted in: 53
- Stats at Baseball Reference

Teams
- Detroit Tigers (1938); Washington Senators (1941); St. Louis Browns (1941, 1946)

George Albert Archie (April 27, 1914 – September 20, 2001) was an American infielder in Major League Baseball who played for the Detroit Tigers, Washington Senators and St. Louis Browns spanning three seasons. Archie was predominantly a third baseman, but also played first base. Archie began his career with the Detroit Tigers in 1938, and subsequently played for the Washington Senators (1941) and St. Louis Browns (1941, 1946).

== Personal life ==
Archie served as a corporal in the 65th Infantry Division of the United States Army during World War II. Enlisting in December 1941, he served in Europe.
