= Buck Frierson =

American baseball player (1917–1996)

- Outfielder
- Born: July 29, 1917; Chicota, Texas, U.S.
- Died: June 26, 1996 (aged 78); Paris, Texas, U.S.
- Batted: Right Threw: Right

MLB debut
- September 9, 1941, for the Cleveland Indians

Last MLB appearance
- September 15, 1941, for the Cleveland Indians

MLB statistics
- Batting average: .273
- Home runs: 0
- Runs batted in: 2
- Stats at Baseball Reference

Teams
- Cleveland Indians (1941)

Robert Lawrence "Buck" Frierson (July 29, 1917 – June 26, 1996) was an American outfielder in Major League Baseball for the Cleveland Indians. He is most famous for his minor league performance in 1947, when he hit 58 home runs with 197 runs batted in. Frierson stood at 6' 3" and weighed 195 lbs.

== Career ==
Frierson was born in Chicota, Texas. He started his professional baseball career in 1937, with the Texarkana Liners of the East Texas League. In 1938, he had his breakout season, batting .342 with 15 home runs. However, his hitting declined the following season. He rebounded by hitting .335 in the Illinois–Indiana–Iowa League in 1940. Frierson then moved up to the Class A Eastern League in 1941. After batting .310 for the Wilkes-Barre Barons, he was called up to the Cleveland Indians late in the season. In his five major league games, he batted .273 with 2 runs batted in. That would be the only chance he would ever get in the majors.

Frierson spent 1942 back in Wilkes-Barre before leaving professional baseball for the next three seasons due to World War II. He returned in 1946 with the Sherman Twins. Despite playing in only 84 games, he made an immediate impact, batting .391 with 25 home runs. Frierson had his best year in 1947. That season, he slugged a career-high 58 homers and drove in 197 runs for Sherman-Denison, leading the Big State League in both categories. He batted .379 and also led the league in games played, hits, and total bases. The 197 RBI is the fifth highest total in minor league baseball history.

Frierson was batting .367 in 1948 when he moved up to the Dallas Eagles of the Class AA Texas League. He spent 1948 to 1951 in the Texas League. In 1952, Frierson returned to the Big State League with the Paris Indians. He had another good season, batting .376 with 24 home runs. He topped the circuit in batting average, slugging percentage, hits, and doubles.

Frierson retired from professional baseball in 1953. He died in 1996, at the age of 78.
