= Lou Fitzgerald =

American baseball player, scout, and manager

H. Louis Fitzgerald (August 25, 1919 – January 27, 2013) was an American professional baseball player, scout and manager.

A native and lifelong resident of Cleveland, Tennessee, he was a second baseman and third baseman in his playing days (1942; 1946–1957). The 6 ft (1.8 m), 160 lb (73 kg) Fitzergald batted left-handed and threw right-handed.

== Longtime minor league manager ==
In a 20-year (1951–1970) managing career in the minor leagues, Fitzergald won 1,241 games, losing 1,171 (.515). He began his managing career as a playing skipper with unaffiliated teams in the low minors such as the Class D Sooner State League and Evangeline League, but in 1957 he began working for Major League affiliates in the farm systems of the Baltimore Orioles, Houston Colt .45s/Astros, Cincinnati Reds and Atlanta Braves.

In 1967, as skipper of the Buffalo Bisons of the Triple-A International League, Fitzgerald managed a young Johnny Bench, the future Baseball Hall of Fame catcher. However, on July 5, 1967, Fitzgerald swapped jobs with the Reds' Double-A Knoxville Smokies manager, Don Zimmer, and Zimmer would be Bench's last minor league pilot before his promotion to Cincinnati. Fitzgerald was also a longtime associate of Paul Richards, working under Richards with Baltimore, Houston and Atlanta.

== Scout for Pirates, Braves and Marlins ==
Fitzgerald also served as a Tennessee-based scout for the Pittsburgh Pirates (1976), Braves (1982–1990) and Florida Marlins (1991–1993). He was accorded numerous honors during his 55-year baseball career, including membership in the Professional Scouts Hall of Fame and the "sports halls of fame" of Tennessee, Chattanooga, San Antonio, and his home city of Cleveland, where he served as director of the municipal recreation department.

He died at age 93 in Cleveland, Tennessee.
