= Port Arthur Sea Hawks =

The Port Arthur Sea Hawks were a Gulf Coast League (1950–1953), Evangeline League (1940–1942, 1954) and Big State League (1955–1956) baseball team based in Port Arthur, Texas, United States. In 1953, they were affiliated with the Dallas Eagles, and in 1954 they were affiliated with the Tyler Tigers.

The Sea Hawks played in Seahawk stadium, a new baseball field that was built in 1950 that could seat up to 4,800 fans. The stadium was built in the hopes that professional baseball teams would continue playing in Port Arthur, but the stadium was only used for eight years before it was torn down.

They won one league championship in their history, in their final season - 1956, under managers Lloyd Gearhart and Al Barillari. Among the players who played for them was Al Silvera.
