= Homer Peel =

American baseball player (1902–1997)

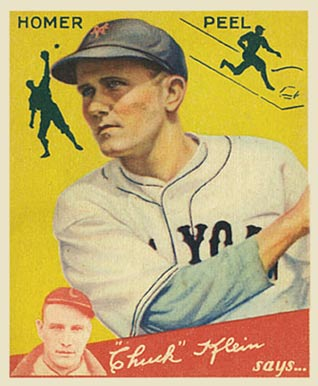
- Homer Peel 1934 Goudey baseball card
- Outfielder
- Born: October 10, 1902; Port Sullivan, Texas, U.S.
- Died: April 8, 1997 (aged 94); Shreveport, Louisiana, U.S.
- Batted: Right Threw: Right

MLB debut
- September 13, 1927, for the St. Louis Cardinals

Last MLB appearance
- June 25, 1934, for the New York Giants

MLB statistics
- Batting average: .238
- Home runs: 2
- Runs batted in: 44
- Stats at Baseball Reference

Teams
- St. Louis Cardinals (1927); Philadelphia Phillies (1929); St. Louis Cardinals (1930); New York Giants (1933–1934)

Career highlights and awards
- World Series champion (1933)

Homer Hefner Peel (October 10, 1902 – April 8, 1997) was an American professional baseball player and manager during the first half of the 20th century. His career lasted for a quarter century (1923–42; 1946–50), including 21 years as an outfielder and four years as a non-playing manager. Peel appeared in 186 Major League Baseball games over five seasons (1927; 1929–30; 1933–34) for the St. Louis Cardinals, Philadelphia Phillies and New York Giants. The native of Port Sullivan, Milam County, Texas, threw and batted right-handed, stood 5 feet 9 inches (1.75 m) tall and weighed 170 pounds (77 kg). He served in the United States Navy during World War II.

Peel batted only .238 with an even 100 hits, two home runs and 44 RBI during his Major League career. But he was a member of the 1933 World Series champion Giants, appearing in two games of the 1933 World Series. He was a defensive replacement in center field for Kiddo Davis in Game 2, and singled as a pinch hitter for Freddie Fitzsimmons in Game 3 off Earl Whitehill of the Washington Senators.

In addition, Peel was one of the top players in minor league baseball during the 1920s and 1930s He hit over .300 for more than a dozen seasons and was known as "the Ty Cobb of the Texas League", where hit batted .325 lifetime. He also managed the Fort Worth Cats, Oklahoma City Indians and Shreveport Sports in the Texas circuit.

Peel died on April 8, 1997 in Shreveport, Louisiana, at age 94.
