= Monty Stratton =

American baseball player (1912–1982)

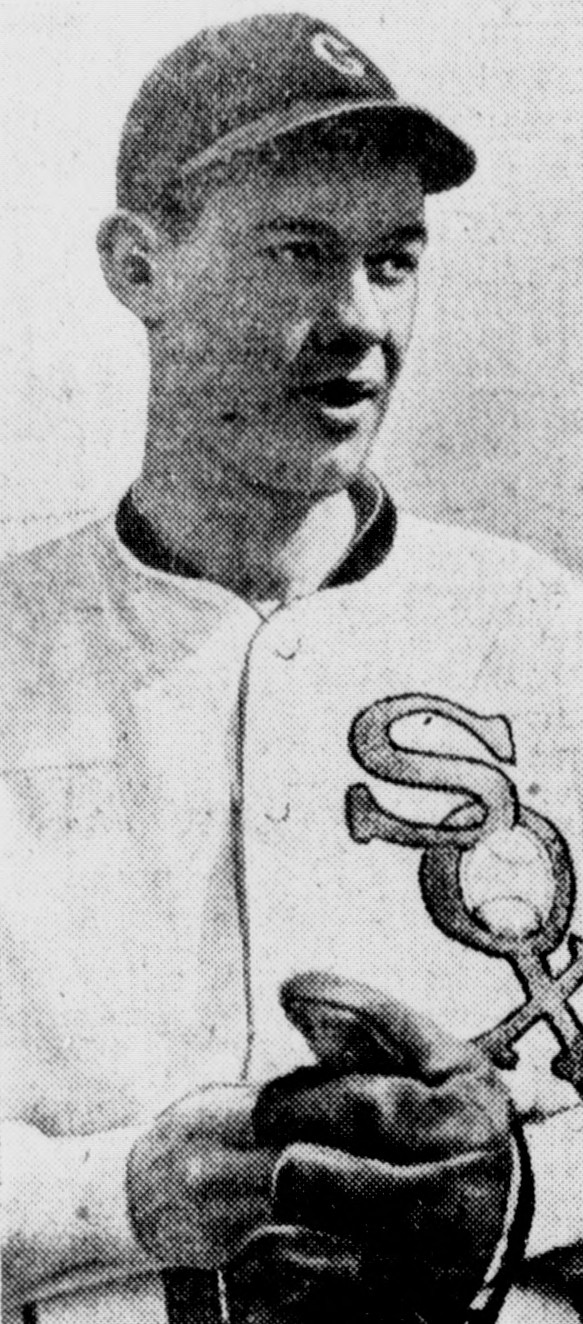
- Stratton, circa 1938
- Pitcher
- Born: May 21, 1912; Palacios, Texas, U.S.
- Died: September 29, 1982 (aged 70); Greenville, Texas, U.S.
- Batted: Right Threw: Right

MLB debut
- June 2, 1934, for the Chicago White Sox

Last MLB appearance
- September 27, 1938, for the Chicago White Sox

MLB statistics
- Win–loss record: 36–23
- Earned run average: 3.71
- Strikeouts: 196
- Stats at Baseball Reference

Teams
- Chicago White Sox (1934–1938)

Career highlights and awards
- All-Star (1937)

Monty Franklin Pierce Stratton (May 21, 1912 – September 29, 1982) was an American professional baseball pitcher in Major League Baseball (MLB). He was born in Palacios, Texas (some sources state Wagner, Texas) and lived in Greenville, Texas, for part of his life. His major league career ended prematurely when a hunting accident in 1938 forced doctors to amputate his right leg. Wearing a prosthetic leg, Stratton played in the minor leagues from 1946 to 1953. His comeback was the subject of the 1949 film The Stratton Story, in which he was portrayed by Jimmy Stewart.

== Major league career ==
Stratton began his career with the Van Alstyne Grays before playing for the Chicago White Sox. Stratton pitched five years with the White Sox (1934–38), compiling a career 36–23 record with 196 strikeouts and a 3.71 earned run average (ERA) in 487 1/3 innings pitched. As a hitter, Stratton was better than average for a pitcher, posting a .224 batting average (43-for-192) with 33 runs, four home runs and 24 runs batted in in 71 games. Defensively, he recorded a .975 fielding percentage.

Stratton was 6 ft 5 in (1.96 m)-tall and was a right-hander. He made his debut with the White Sox on June 2, 1934. He became a starter in 1937, winning 15 games with a 2.40 ERA and five shutouts, and made the American League All-Star squad. The following season, he again won 15 and completed 17 of his 22 starts.

== Post-accident ==
On November 27, 1938, Stratton was hunting rabbits on his family farm when he fell, accidentally discharging his shotgun. The pellets struck his right leg, damaging a main artery enough to require amputation the next day. Fitted with a wooden leg, Stratton worked with the White Sox the next two years as a coach and batting practice pitcher. In 1939, White Sox management sponsored a charity game in Comiskey Park against the Chicago Cubs, the proceeds of which (about $28,000 equal to $648,086 today) went to Stratton. He took the mound to demonstrate that he could still pitch, though he was unable to transfer his weight effectively to the artificial leg.

When World War II began, Stratton attempted to enlist but was rejected. Then he organized a semi-professional baseball team at Greenville, Texas and constantly practiced coordination on the field. He spent much time experimenting and learning how to pitch despite the prosthetic leg, primarily pitching to his wife, Ethel (Milberger) Stratton, and against the side of a barn.

In 1946, Stratton pitched for the Sherman Twins of the East Texas League (Class C) and compiled a record of 18–8, with a 4.17 earned run average (ERA). In 1947, with the Waco Dons of the Big State League (Class B), he went 7–7 with a 6.55 ERA. A major challenge was moving nimbly enough on his prosthetic leg to field the bunts that were commonly sent his way by opponents. After 1947, Stratton never appeared in more than four games in a season, though he joined multiple minor-league teams ranging from Class B to Class D in 1949, 1950, and 1953.

== Legacy and life after baseball ==
Stratton's comeback attempt was the subject of a 1949 film and Lux Radio Theatre episode as The Stratton Story, both of which starred Jimmy Stewart and June Allyson, with big-leaguers Gene Bearden, Bill Dickey, Merv Shea, and Jimmy Dykes in cameo appearances. Stratton had spent most of one year in Hollywood serving as an adviser for the movie. The film was a financial success and earned an Academy Award for best original story.

The Strattons, who lived for many years on a 93-acre farm in the Ardis Heights area of Greenville, were members of Wesley Methodist Church and were also active in the Greenville community. Monty Stratton helped start the Greenville Little League Baseball program and was recognized for his efforts by the naming of Monty Stratton Field near Greenville High School.

Stratton's son Dennis died by suicide in 1964, aged 23 years.

Stratton died in Greenville, Texas, on September 29, 1982, at the age of 70 due to cancer. He was survived by his wife, Ethel; a son, Monty Jr.; two brothers; a sister; and four grandchildren. Ethel, who served for many years as a volunteer at Hunt Regional Medical Center in Greenville, died in 2006 in Arlington, Texas at age 90. Monty and Ethel Stratton are buried at Memoryland Memorial Park in Greenville.

In Woody Allen's Radio Days, there's a parody of a short film documentary about a pitcher based on Monty.
