= Waco Pirates =

- 1947–1956; Waco, Texas

Minor league affiliations
- Previous classes: Class-B
- League: Big State League

Major league affiliations
- Previous teams: Pittsburgh Pirates (1948–1956)

Minor league titles
- League titles: 1949, 1954

Team data
- Previous names: Waco Pirates (1948–1956); Longview Pirates (1953); Waco Dons (1947)
- Previous parks: Katy Park

The Waco Pirates were a minor league baseball team based in Waco, Texas who played in the Big State League from 1947–1956. They were an affiliate of the Pittsburgh Pirates franchise. The team actually began as the Waco Dons in 1947 but changed their name when they became a Pirates affiliate. The team briefly moved to Longview, Texas on May 22, 1953 as a result of damage caused by the 1953 Waco tornado outbreak. The team finished out the season as the Longview Pirates before returning to Waco the following season. As the Longview Pirates, the team featured numerous Major League Baseball players: Brandy Davis, Bob Garber, Fred Green, Dick Hall and Sonny Senerchia. The 1954 Pirates were recognized as one of the 100 greatest minor league teams of all time.
