= 1938 Philadelphia Athletics season =

1938 Philadelphia Athletics
- League: American League
- Ballpark: Shibe Park
- City: Philadelphia
- Record: 53–99 (.349)
- League place: 8th
- Owners: Connie Mack
- Managers: Connie Mack
- Radio: WIP (By Saam); WFIL (Stan Lomax)

The 1938 Philadelphia Athletics season involved the A's finishing eighth in the American League with a record of 53 wins and 99 losses.

== Regular season ==
=== Season standings ===
American League
Team	W	L	Pct.	GB	Home	Road
New York Yankees	99	53	.651	—	55‍–‍22	44‍–‍31
Boston Red Sox	88	61	.591	9½	52‍–‍23	36‍–‍38
Cleveland Indians	86	66	.566	13	46‍–‍30	40‍–‍36
Detroit Tigers	84	70	.545	16	48‍–‍31	36‍–‍39
Washington Senators	75	76	.497	23½	44‍–‍33	31‍–‍43
Chicago White Sox	65	83	.439	32	33‍–‍39	32‍–‍44
St. Louis Browns	55	97	.362	44	31‍–‍43	24‍–‍54
Philadelphia Athletics	53	99	.349	46	28‍–‍47	25‍–‍52

=== Record vs. opponents ===
1938 American League record Sources:
Team	BOS	CWS	CLE	DET	NYY	PHA	SLB	WSH
Boston	—	12–6	12–10	10–12	11–11–1	14–8	17–5	12–9
Chicago	6–12	—	9–13	7–15	8–14	12–10	13–8–1	10–11
Cleveland	10–12	13–9	—	12–10	8–13	18–4	13–9–1	12–9
Detroit	12–10	15–7	10–12	—	8–14	14–8	12–10–1	13–9
New York	11–11–1	14–8	13–8	14–8	—	16–5–2	15–7–1	16–6–1
Philadelphia	8–14	10–12	4–18	8–14	5–16–2	—	12–9	6–16
St. Louis	5–17	8–13–1	9–13–1	10–12–1	7–15–1	9–12	—	7–15
Washington	9–12	11–10	9–12	9–13	6–16–1	16–6	15–7	—

=== Notable transactions ===
- May 4, 1938: Harry Kelley was selected off waivers from the Athletics by the Washington Senators.

=== Roster ===
1938 Philadelphia Athletics
Roster
Pitchers: -- Ralph Buxton; 16 George Caster; 19 Chubby Dean; -- Randy Gumpert; 15 Harry Kelley; 22 Lynn Nelson; 24 Nels Potter; 30 Jim Reninger; 17 Buck Ross; 11 Dave Smith; 18 Eddie Smith; 21,20 Bud Thomas; 21 Al Williams	Catchers: 29 Charlie Berry; 9 Earle Brucker; 8 Frankie Hayes; 26 Hal Wagner; Infielders: 12 Wayne Ambler; -- Irv Bartling; -- Nick Etten; 8 Lou Finney; 5 Gene Hasson; 7 Dario Lodigiani; 2 Skeeter Newsome; 25,30 Ace Parker; 11 Rusty Peters; 10 Dick Siebert; 7 Stan Sperry; 3 Billy Werber	Outfielders: 14 Babe Barna; 14 Sam Chapman; 10 Paul Easterling; 30 Mule Haas; 4 Bob Johnson; 1 Wally Moses	Manager: Connie Mack; Coaches: 29 Charlie Berry; 28 Lena Blackburne; 27 Earle Mack

== Player stats ==
= Indicates team leader

=== Batting ===
==== Starters by position ====
Note: Pos = Position; G = Games played; AB = At bats; H = Hits; Avg. = Batting average; HR = Home runs; RBI = Runs batted in

Pos	Player	GP	AB	H	Avg.	HR	RBI
C	Frankie Hayes	99	316	92	.291	11	55
1B	Lou Finney	122	454	125	.275	10	48
2B	Dario Lodigiani	93	325	91	.280	6	44
SS	Wayne Ambler	120	393	92	.234	0	38
3B	Billy Werber	134	499	129	.259	11	69
OF	Wally Moses	142	589	181	.307	8	49
OF	Bob Johnson	152	563	176	.313	30	113
OF	Sam Chapman	114	406	105	.259	17	63

==== Other batters ====
Note: G = Games played; AB = At bats; H = Hits; Avg. = Batting average; HR = Home runs; RBI = Runs batted in

Player	G	AB	H	Avg.	HR	RBI
Stan Sperry	60	253	69	.273	0	27
Dick Siebert	48	194	55	.284	0	28
Earle Brucker	53	171	64	.374	3	35
Ace Parker	56	113	26	.230	0	12
Hal Wagner	33	88	20	.227	0	8
Nick Etten	22	81	21	.259	0	11
Mule Haas	40	78	16	.205	0	12
Gene Hasson	19	69	19	.275	1	12
Skeeter Newsome	17	48	13	.271	0	7
Irv Bartling	14	46	8	.174	0	5
Babe Barna	9	30	4	.133	0	2
Paul Easterling	4	7	2	.286	0	0
Rusty Peters	2	7	0	.000	0	0
Charlie Berry	1	2	0	.000	0	0

=== Pitching ===
= Indicates league leader

==== Starting pitchers ====
Note: G = Games pitched; IP = Innings pitched; W = Wins; L = Losses; ERA = Earned run average; SO = Strikeouts

Player	G	IP	W	L	ERA	SO
George Caster	42	281.1	16	20	4.35	112
Bud Thomas	42	212.1	9	14	4.92	48
Lynn Nelson	32	191.0	10	11	5.65	75
Buck Ross	29	184.1	9	16	5.32	54
Jim Reninger	4	22.2	0	2	7.15	9

==== Other pitchers ====
Note: G = Games pitched; IP = Innings pitched; W = Wins; L = Losses; ERA = Earned run average; SO = Strikeouts

Player	G	IP	W	L	ERA	SO
Chubby Dean	6	23.0	2	1	3.52	3
Randy Gumpert	4	12.1	0	2	10.95	1
Harry Kelley	4	8.0	0	2	16.88	3

==== Relief pitchers ====
Note: G = Games pitched; W = Wins; L = Losses; SV = Saves; ERA = Earned run average; SO = Strikeouts

Player	G	W	L	SV	ERA	SO
Eddie Smith	43	3	10	4	5.92	78
Nels Potter	35	2	12	5	6.47	43
Al Williams	30	0	7	0	6.94	25
Dave Smith	21	2	1	0	5.08	13
Ralph Buxton	5	0	1	0	4.82	9

== Farm system ==
Level	Team	League	Manager
A	Williamsport Grays	Eastern League	Marty McManus
D	Federalsburg Athletics	Eastern Shore League	Charlie Moss
D	Lexington Indians	North Carolina State League	Phil Lundeen
