= 1938 Boston Red Sox season =

Major League Baseball season

1938 Boston Red Sox
- League: American League
- Ballpark: Fenway Park
- City: Boston, Massachusetts
- Record: 88–61 (.591)
- League place: 2nd
- Owners: Tom Yawkey
- President: Tom Yawkey
- General managers: Eddie Collins
- Managers: Joe Cronin
- Radio: WAAB (Fred Hoey)
- Stats: ESPN.com; Baseball Reference

The 1938 Boston Red Sox season was the 38th season in the franchise's Major League Baseball history. The Red Sox finished second in the American League (AL) with a record of 88 wins and 61 losses, 9 1/2 games behind the New York Yankees, who went on to win the 1938 World Series.

Red Sox first baseman Jimmie Foxx had a .349 batting average with 50 home runs and 175 runs batted in; he was named the AL Most Valuable Player.

== Offseason ==
- December 2, 1937: Red Kress, Buster Mills and Bobo Newsom were traded by the Red Sox to the St. Louis Browns for Joe Vosmik.

On December 6, 1937, the Red Sox purchased outfielder Ted Williams from the Pacific Coast League San Diego Padres for $25,000 and four minor league players, with the deal announced the following day on December 7.

== Regular season ==
The 1938 Boston Red Sox finished higher than any other Sox team since 1918. The Red Sox finished in second place with 88 wins and 61 losses, finishing 9 1/2 games behind the New York Yankees. Jimmie Foxx led the American League with a .349 batting average, 50 home runs and 175 RBIs, becoming the first player to win three American League MVP Awards.

=== Season standings ===
American League
Team	W	L	Pct.	GB	Home	Road
New York Yankees	99	53	.651	—	55‍–‍22	44‍–‍31
Boston Red Sox	88	61	.591	9½	52‍–‍23	36‍–‍38
Cleveland Indians	86	66	.566	13	46‍–‍30	40‍–‍36
Detroit Tigers	84	70	.545	16	48‍–‍31	36‍–‍39
Washington Senators	75	76	.497	23½	44‍–‍33	31‍–‍43
Chicago White Sox	65	83	.439	32	33‍–‍39	32‍–‍44
St. Louis Browns	55	97	.362	44	31‍–‍43	24‍–‍54
Philadelphia Athletics	53	99	.349	46	28‍–‍47	25‍–‍52

=== Record vs. opponents ===
1938 American League record Sources:
Team	BOS	CWS	CLE	DET	NYY	PHA	SLB	WSH
Boston	—	12–6	12–10	10–12	11–11–1	14–8	17–5	12–9
Chicago	6–12	—	9–13	7–15	8–14	12–10	13–8–1	10–11
Cleveland	10–12	13–9	—	12–10	8–13	18–4	13–9–1	12–9
Detroit	12–10	15–7	10–12	—	8–14	14–8	12–10–1	13–9
New York	11–11–1	14–8	13–8	14–8	—	16–5–2	15–7–1	16–6–1
Philadelphia	8–14	10–12	4–18	8–14	5–16–2	—	12–9	6–16
St. Louis	5–17	8–13–1	9–13–1	10–12–1	7–15–1	9–12	—	7–15
Washington	9–12	11–10	9–12	9–13	6–16–1	16–6	15–7	—

=== Opening Day lineup ===
8	Doc Cramer	CF
7	Joe Vosmik	LF
3	Jimmie Foxx	1B
4	Joe Cronin	SS
5	Pinky Higgins	3B
9	Ben Chapman	RF
1	Bobby Doerr	2B
2	Gene Desautels	C
17	Jim Bagby	P

=== Roster ===
1938 Boston Red Sox
Roster
Pitchers: 17 Jim Bagby; 15 Al Baker; 16 Emerson Dickman; 10 Lefty Grove; 11 Bill Harris; 19 Joe Heving; 19 Byron Humphrey; 1 Bill Lefebvre; 12 Johnny Marcum; 14 Archie McKain; 27 Dick Midkiff; 12 Ted Olson; 21 Fritz Ostermueller; 15 Lee Rogers; 11 Charlie Wagner; 18 Jack Wilson	Catchers: 22 Moe Berg; 2 Gene Desautels; 23 Johnny Peacock; Infielders: 4 Joe Cronin; 1 Bobby Doerr; 3 Jimmie Foxx; 5 Pinky Higgins; 6 Eric McNair; 26 Jim Tabor	Outfielders: 9 Ben Chapman; 8 Doc Cramer; 25 Fabian Gaffke; 24 Red Nonnenkamp; 7 Joe Vosmik	Manager: 4 Joe Cronin; Coaches: 30 Tom Daly (Third base); 31 Herb Pennock (Pitching)

== Player stats ==
= Indicates team leader

= Indicates league leader

=== Batting ===
==== Starters by position ====
Note: Pos = Position; G = Games played; AB = At bats; H = Hits; Avg. = Batting average; HR = Home runs; RBI = Runs batted in

Pos	Player	G	AB	H	Avg.	HR	RBI
C	Gene Desautels	108	333	97	.291	2	48
1B	Jimmie Foxx	149	565	197	.349	50	175
2B	Bobby Doerr	145	509	147	.289	5	80
SS	Joe Cronin	143	530	172	.325	17	94
3B	Pinky Higgins	139	524	159	.303	5	106
OF	Joe Vosmik	146	621	201	.324	9	86
OF	Doc Cramer	148	658	198	.301	0	71
OF	Ben Chapman	127	480	163	.340	6	80

==== Other batters ====
Note: G = Games played; AB = At bats; H = Hits; Avg. = Batting average; HR = Home runs; RBI = Runs batted in

Player	G	AB	H	Avg.	HR	RBI
Johnny Peacock	72	195	59	.303	1	39
Red Nonnenkamp	87	180	51	.283	0	18
Eric McNair	46	96	15	.156	0	7
Jim Tabor	19	57	18	.316	1	8
Moe Berg	10	12	4	.333	0	0
Fabian Gaffke	15	10	1	.100	0	1

=== Pitching ===
==== Starting pitchers ====
Note: G = Games pitched; IP = Innings pitched; W = Wins; L = Losses; ERA = Earned run average; SO = Strikeouts

Player	G	IP	W	L	ERA	SO
Jack Wilson	37	194.2	15	15	4.30	96
Lefty Grove	24	163.2	14	4	3.08	99
Johnny Marcum	15	92.1	5	6	4.09	25
Joe Heving	16	82.0	8	1	3.73	34
Bill Harris	13	80.1	5	5	4.03	26

==== Other pitchers ====
Note: G = Games pitched; IP = Innings pitched; W = Wins; L = Losses; ERA = Earned run average; SO = Strikeouts

Player	G	IP	W	L	ERA	SO
Jim Bagby	43	198.2	15	11	4.21	73
Fritz Ostermueller	31	176.2	13	5	4.58	46
Emerson Dickman	32	104.0	5	5	5.28	22
Archie McKain	37	99.2	5	4	4.52	27
Charlie Wagner	13	36.2	1	3	8.35	14
Dick Midkiff	13	35.1	1	1	5.09	10
Lee Rogers	14	27.2	1	1	6.51	7

==== Relief pitchers ====
Note: G = Games pitched; W = Wins; L = Losses; SV = Saves; ERA = Earned run average; SO = Strikeouts

Player	G	W	L	SV	ERA	SO
Al Baker	3	0	0	0	9.39	2
Ted Olson	2	0	0	0	6.43	2
Doc Cramer	1	0	0	0	4.50	1
Bill LeFebvre	1	0	0	0	13.50	0
Byron Humphrey	1	0	0	0	9.00	1

== Farm system ==
Level	Team	League	Manager
AA	Minneapolis Millers	American Association	Donie Bush
A1	Little Rock Travelers	Southern Association	Doc Prothro
A	Hazleton Red Sox	Eastern League	Specs Toporcer
B	Rocky Mount Red Sox	Piedmont League	Herb Brett
C	Clarksdale Red Sox	Cotton States League	Nemo Leibold
C	Canton Terriers	Middle Atlantic League	Floyd "Pat" Patterson
D	Elizabethton Betsy Red Sox	Appalachian League	Hobe Brummette
D	Danville-Schoolfield Leafs	Bi-State League	Red Barnes
D	Moultrie Packers	Georgia–Florida League	Dewey Stover
D	Crookston Pirates	Northern League	Bill Burwell
