= 1938 Chicago White Sox season =

1938 Chicago White Sox
- League: American League
- Ballpark: Comiskey Park
- City: Chicago
- Owners: J. Louis Comiskey
- General manager: Harry Grabiner
- Managers: Jimmy Dykes
- Radio: WBBM (Pat Flanagan, Charlie Grimm, Val Sherman); WCFL (Hal Totten); WGN (Bob Elson); WIND (Russ Hodges, Jimmy Dudley); WJJD (John Harrington, Jack Drees)

The 1938 Chicago White Sox season was the White Sox's 38th season in the major leagues and their 39th season overall. They finished with a record of 65–83, good enough for sixth place in the American League, 32 games behind the first place New York Yankees.

== Offseason ==
- December 2, 1937: Vern Kennedy, Tony Piet, and Dixie Walker were traded by the White Sox to the Detroit Tigers for Mike Tresh, Marv Owen and Gee Walker.

== Regular season ==
=== Season standings ===
American League
Team	W	L	Pct.	GB	Home	Road
New York Yankees	99	53	.651	—	55‍–‍22	44‍–‍31
Boston Red Sox	88	61	.591	9½	52‍–‍23	36‍–‍38
Cleveland Indians	86	66	.566	13	46‍–‍30	40‍–‍36
Detroit Tigers	84	70	.545	16	48‍–‍31	36‍–‍39
Washington Senators	75	76	.497	23½	44‍–‍33	31‍–‍43
Chicago White Sox	65	83	.439	32	33‍–‍39	32‍–‍44
St. Louis Browns	55	97	.362	44	31‍–‍43	24‍–‍54
Philadelphia Athletics	53	99	.349	46	28‍–‍47	25‍–‍52

=== Record vs. opponents ===
1938 American League record Sources:
Team	BOS	CWS	CLE	DET	NYY	PHA	SLB	WSH
Boston	—	12–6	12–10	10–12	11–11–1	14–8	17–5	12–9
Chicago	6–12	—	9–13	7–15	8–14	12–10	13–8–1	10–11
Cleveland	10–12	13–9	—	12–10	8–13	18–4	13–9–1	12–9
Detroit	12–10	15–7	10–12	—	8–14	14–8	12–10–1	13–9
New York	11–11–1	14–8	13–8	14–8	—	16–5–2	15–7–1	16–6–1
Philadelphia	8–14	10–12	4–18	8–14	5–16–2	—	12–9	6–16
St. Louis	5–17	8–13–1	9–13–1	10–12–1	7–15–1	9–12	—	7–15
Washington	9–12	11–10	9–12	9–13	6–16–1	16–6	15–7	—

=== Opening Day lineup ===
- Jackie Hayes, 2B
- Mike Kreevich, CF
- Gee Walker, RF
- Rip Radcliff, LF
- Joe Kuhel, 1B
- Marv Owen, 3B
- Boze Berger, SS
- Luke Sewell, C
- John Whitehead, P

=== Notable transactions ===
- June 11, 1938: Bill Cox was traded by the White Sox to the St. Louis Browns for Jack Knott.

=== Roster ===
1938 Chicago White Sox
Roster
Pitchers: 26 Harry Boyles; 26 Clint Brown; 17 Sugar Cain; 24 Bill Cox; 18 Bill Dietrich; 6 Gene Ford; 26,45 Frank Gabler; 48 George Gick; 24 Jack Knott; 27 Thornton Lee; 16 Ted Lyons; 29 Johnny Rigney; 25 Monty Stratton; 47 Bob Uhl; 34,21 John Whitehead	Catchers: 35 Tony Rensa; 36 Norm Schlueter; 14 Luke Sewell; 15 Mike Tresh; Infielders: 4 Luke Appling; 19 Boze Berger; 18 Merv Connors; 5 Jimmy Dykes; 47 Johnny Gerlach; 37 Jackie Hayes; 3 Joe Kuhel; 28 Jesse Landrum; 17 George Meyer; 2 Marv Owen; 6 Tommy Thompson	Outfielders: 8 Mike Kreevich; 9 Rip Radcliff; 12 Larry Rosenthal; 46 Hank Steinbacher; 7 Gee Walker; Other batters: 45 Joe Martin	Manager: 5 Jimmy Dykes; Coaches: 33 Jimmy Austin; 38 Muddy Ruel; 22 Bill Webb

== Player stats ==
=== Batting ===
Note: G = Games played; AB = At bats; R = Runs scored; H = Hits; 2B = Doubles; 3B = Triples; HR = Home runs; RBI = Runs batted in; BB = Base on balls; SO = Strikeouts; AVG = Batting average; SB = Stolen bases

Player	G	AB	R	H	2B	3B	HR	RBI	BB	SO	AVG	SB
Luke Appling, SS	81	294	41	89	14	0	0	44	42	17	.303	1
Boze Berger, SS, 2B, 3B	118	470	60	102	15	3	3	36	43	80	.217	4
Merv Connors, 1B	24	62	14	22	4	0	6	13	9	17	.355	0
Jimmy Dykes, 2B	26	89	9	27	4	2	2	13	10	8	.303	0
Johnny Gerlach, SS	9	25	2	7	0	0	0	1	4	2	.280	0
Jackie Hayes, 2B	62	238	40	78	21	2	1	20	24	6	.328	3
Mike Kreevich, CF	129	489	73	145	26	12	6	73	55	23	.297	13
Joe Kuhel, 1B	117	412	67	110	27	4	8	51	72	35	.267	9
Jesse Landrum, 2B	4	6	0	0	0	0	0	1	0	2	.000	0
Joe Martin, PR	1	0	0	0	0	0	0	0	0	0	.000	0
George Meyer, 2B	24	81	10	24	2	2	0	9	11	17	.296	3
Marv Owen, 3B	141	577	84	162	23	6	6	55	45	31	.281	6
Rip Radcliff, LF, 1B	129	503	64	166	23	6	5	81	36	17	.330	5
Tony Rensa, C	59	165	15	41	5	0	3	19	25	16	.248	1
Larry Rosenthal, CF	61	105	14	30	5	1	1	12	12	13	.286	0
Norm Schlueter, C	35	118	11	27	5	1	0	7	4	15	.229	1
Luke Sewell, C	65	211	23	45	4	1	0	27	20	20	.213	0
Hank Steinbacher, RF, CF	106	399	59	132	23	8	4	61	41	19	.331	1
Tommy Thompson, 1B	19	18	2	2	0	0	0	2	1	2	.111	0
Mike Tresh, C	10	28	3	7	2	0	0	2	8	4	.241	0
Gee Walker, RF, LF	120	442	69	135	23	6	16	87	38	32	.305	9

Player	G	AB	R	H	2B	3B	HR	RBI	BB	SO	AVG	SB
Harry Boyles, P	9	8	0	1	0	0	0	0	0	2	.125	0
Clint Brown, P	8	2	1	1	1	0	0	0	1	0	.500	0
Sugar Cain, P	5	8	0	0	0	0	0	0	0	5	.000	0
Bill Cox, P	7	2	0	0	0	0	0	0	0	2	.000	0
Bill Dietrich, P	8	16	3	1	0	0	0	0	2	5	.063	0
Gene Ford, P	4	6	0	1	0	0	0	0	0	2	.167	0
Frank Gabler, P	18	21	1	5	1	0	0	2	0	5	.238	0
Jack Knott, P	20	40	0	5	0	0	0	2	2	19	.125	0
Thornton Lee, P	34	97	14	25	3	1	4	16	0	23	.258	0
Ted Lyons, P	24	72	9	14	2	0	0	4	2	9	.194	0
Johnny Rigney, P	38	55	1	8	1	0	0	4	1	17	.145	0
Monty Stratton, P	27	79	17	21	5	0	2	10	2	9	.266	0
John Whitehead, P	32	60	3	6	0	0	0	5	5	15	.100	0
Team totals	149	5199	709	1439	239	55	67	657	515	489	.277	56

=== Pitching ===
Note: W = Wins; L = Losses; ERA = Earned run average; G = Games pitched; GS = Games started; SV = Saves; IP = Innings pitched; H = Hits allowed; R = Runs allowed; ER = Earned runs allowed; HR = Home runs allowed; BB = Walks allowed; K = Strikeouts

Player	W	L	ERA	G	GS	SV	IP	H	R	ER	HR	BB	K
Harry Boyles	0	4	5.22	9	2	1	29.1	31	27	17	2	25	18
Clint Brown	1	3	4.61	8	0	2	13.2	16	8	7	0	9	2
Sugar Cain	0	1	4.58	5	3	0	19.2	26	17	10	0	18	6
Bill Cox	0	2	6.94	7	1	0	11.2	11	14	9	0	13	5
Bill Dietrich	2	4	5.44	8	7	0	48.0	49	33	29	7	31	11
Gene Ford	0	0	10.29	4	0	0	14.0	21	16	16	1	12	2
Frank Gabler	1	7	9.09	18	7	0	69.1	107	74	70	12	34	17
George Gick	0	0	0.00	1	0	0	1.0	0	0	0	0	0	1
Jack Knott	5	10	4.05	20	18	0	131.0	135	70	59	8	54	35
Thornton Lee	13	12	3.49	33	30	1	245.1	252	123	95	12	94	77
Ted Lyons	9	11	3.70	23	23	0	194.2	238	93	80	13	52	54
Johnny Rigney	9	9	3.56	38	12	1	167.0	164	74	66	16	72	84
Monty Stratton	15	9	4.01	26	22	2	186.1	186	95	83	18	56	82
Bob Uhl	0	0	0.00	1	0	0	2.0	1	0	0	0	0	0
John Whitehead	10	11	4.76	32	24	2	183.1	218	108	97	12	80	38
Team totals	65	83	4.36	149	149	9	1316.1	1449	752	638	101	550	432

== Farm system ==
Level	Team	League	Manager
AA	St. Paul Saints	American Association	Babe Ganzel
A1	Dallas Steers	Texas League	Ray Brubaker and Jim Levey
B	Anniston Rams	Southeastern League	Lena Styles and Ray Brubaker
C	Monroe White Sox	Cotton States League	Luther Harvel and Doug Taitt
C	Longview Cannibals	East Texas League	Harold Funk
D	Rayne Rice Birds	Evangeline League	John Fitzpatrick
D	Lubbock Hubbers	West Texas–New Mexico League	Hack Miller

LEAGUE CHAMPIONS: Monroe, Lubbock
