= Bill Knickerbocker =

American baseball player (1911–1963)

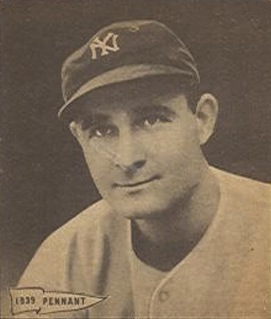
- Shortstop
- Born: December 29, 1911; Los Angeles, California, U.S.
- Died: September 8, 1963 (aged 51); Sebastopol, California, U.S.
- Batted: Right Threw: Right

MLB debut
- April 12, 1933, for the Cleveland Indians

Last MLB appearance
- September 17, 1942, for the Philadelphia Athletics

MLB statistics
- Batting average: .276
- Home runs: 28
- Runs batted in: 368
- Stats at Baseball Reference

Teams
- Cleveland Indians (1933–1936); St. Louis Browns (1937); New York Yankees (1938–1940); Chicago White Sox (1941); Philadelphia Athletics (1942)

William Hart Knickerbocker (December 29, 1911 – September 8, 1963) was an American professional baseball shortstop in Major League Baseball for the Cleveland Indians (1933–1936), St. Louis Browns (1937), New York Yankees (1938–1940), Chicago White Sox (1941) and Philadelphia Athletics (1942). Knickerbocker threw and batted right-handed, stood 5 feet 11 inches (1.80 m) tall and weighed 170 pounds (77 kg).

Born in Los Angeles, Knickerbocker appeared in 46 games for the 1938 Yankees and only six games for the 1939 Yankees. Both clubs won the World Series, but Knickerbocker never appeared in a fall classic contest.

His best season was in 1934 when he finished 19th in voting for the American League MVP Award for playing in 146 games and having 593 at bats, 82 runs, 188 hits, 32 doubles, 5 triples, 4 home runs, 67 RBI, 6 stolen bases, 25 walks, a .317 batting average, .347 on-base percentage, .408 slugging percentage, 242 total bases and 12 sacrifice hits.

In 10 seasons he played in 907 games and had 3,418 at bats, 423 runs, 943 hits, 198 doubles, 27 triples, 28 home runs, 368 RBI, 25 stolen bases, 244 walks, a .276 batting average, .326 on-base percentage, .374 slugging percentage, 1,279 total bases and 82 sacrifice hits.

Knickerbocker spent his whole life in California, and after commencing his career, he established multiple abodes in Whittier. Later on, in 1956, he relocated with his wife, Willda Mary McHolland, to Sebastopol, situated in the wine country of Sonoma County, California.

He died in Sebastopol, California, at the age of 51.

== Sources ==
- Career statistics from Baseball Reference · Baseball Reference (Minors) · Retrosheet · Baseball Almanac
