= 1938 Detroit Tigers season =

Major League Baseball season

1938 Detroit Tigers
- League: American League
- Ballpark: Briggs Stadium
- City: Detroit
- Record: 84–70 (.545)
- League place: 4th
- Owners: Walter Briggs, Sr.
- General managers: Mickey Cochrane
- Managers: Mickey Cochrane, Del Baker
- Radio: WWJ (AM) (Ty Tyson); WXYZ (Harry Heilmann)

The 1938 Detroit Tigers season was a season in American baseball. The Detroit Tigers compiled a record of 84 wins and 70 losses, good enough for fourth place in the American League. Hank Greenberg hit 58 home runs, and became the first unanimous selection as the American League MVP.

== Offseason ==
- December 2, 1937: Mike Tresh, Marv Owen and Gee Walker were traded by the Tigers to the Chicago White Sox for Vern Kennedy, Tony Piet, and Dixie Walker.

== Regular season ==
The highlight of the 1938 season was first baseman Hank Greenberg challenging the single-season home run record held by Babe Ruth (60). Hank went into the season's final weekend against the Cleveland Indians with 58 home runs, but failed to homer on Saturday or Sunday. He did tie Jimmie Foxx's record for a right-handed hitter, set in 1932.

=== Season standings ===
American League
Team	W	L	Pct.	GB	Home	Road
New York Yankees	99	53	.651	—	55‍–‍22	44‍–‍31
Boston Red Sox	88	61	.591	9½	52‍–‍23	36‍–‍38
Cleveland Indians	86	66	.566	13	46‍–‍30	40‍–‍36
Detroit Tigers	84	70	.545	16	48‍–‍31	36‍–‍39
Washington Senators	75	76	.497	23½	44‍–‍33	31‍–‍43
Chicago White Sox	65	83	.439	32	33‍–‍39	32‍–‍44
St. Louis Browns	55	97	.362	44	31‍–‍43	24‍–‍54
Philadelphia Athletics	53	99	.349	46	28‍–‍47	25‍–‍52

=== Record vs. opponents ===
1938 American League record Sources:
Team	BOS	CWS	CLE	DET	NYY	PHA	SLB	WSH
Boston	—	12–6	12–10	10–12	11–11–1	14–8	17–5	12–9
Chicago	6–12	—	9–13	7–15	8–14	12–10	13–8–1	10–11
Cleveland	10–12	13–9	—	12–10	8–13	18–4	13–9–1	12–9
Detroit	12–10	15–7	10–12	—	8–14	14–8	12–10–1	13–9
New York	11–11–1	14–8	13–8	14–8	—	16–5–2	15–7–1	16–6–1
Philadelphia	8–14	10–12	4–18	8–14	5–16–2	—	12–9	6–16
St. Louis	5–17	8–13–1	9–13–1	10–12–1	7–15–1	9–12	—	7–15
Washington	9–12	11–10	9–12	9–13	6–16–1	16–6	15–7	—

=== Roster ===
1938 Detroit Tigers
Roster
Pitchers: 12 Elden Auker; 29 Al Benton; 10 Tommy Bridges; 21 Slick Coffman; 35 Woody Davis; 26 Harry Eisenstat; 16 George Gill; 14 Bob Harris; 11 Vern Kennedy; 15 Roxie Lawson; 17 Boots Poffenberger; 34 Joe Rogalski; 14 Schoolboy Rowe; 18 Jake Wade	Catchers: 23 Ray Hayworth; 28 Birdie Tebbetts; 4 Rudy York; Infielders: 20 Mark Christman; 2 Charlie Gehringer; 5 Hank Greenberg; 24 Benny McCoy; 27 Tony Piet; 7 Billy Rogell; 6 Don Ross	Outfielders: 19 Roy Cullenbine; 9 Pete Fox; 3,25 Chet Laabs; 25 Chet Morgan; 8 Dixie Walker; 22 Jo-Jo White; Other batters: 35 George Archie	Manager: 32 Del Baker; 3 Mickey Cochrane; Coaches: 32 Del Baker; 31 Bing Miller; -- Cy Perkins

== Player stats ==
= Indicates team leader

= Indicates league leader

=== Batting ===
==== Starters by position ====
Note: Pos = Position; G = Games played; AB = At bats; H = Hits; Avg. = Batting average; HR = Home runs; RBI = Runs batted in

Pos	Player	G	AB	H	Avg.	HR	RBI
C	Rudy York	135	463	138	.298	33	127
1B	Hank Greenberg	155	556	175	.315	58	146
2B	Charlie Gehringer	152	568	174	.306	20	107
SS	Billy Rogell	136	501	130	.259	3	55
3B	Don Ross	77	265	69	.260	1	30
OF	Dixie Walker	127	454	140	.308	6	43
OF	Pete Fox	155	634	186	.293	7	96
OF	Chet Morgan	74	306	87	.284	0	27

==== Other batters ====
Note: G = Games played; AB = At bats; H = Hits; Avg. = Batting average; HR = Home runs; RBI = Runs batted in

Player	G	AB	H	Avg.	HR	RBI
Mark Christman	95	318	79	.248	1	44
Chet Laabs	64	211	50	.237	7	37
Jo-Jo White	78	206	54	.262	0	15
Birdie Tebbetts	53	143	42	.294	1	25
Tony Piet	41	80	17	.213	0	14
Roy Cullenbine	25	67	19	.284	0	9
Ray Hayworth	8	19	4	.211	0	5
Benny McCoy	7	15	3	.200	0	0
George Archie	3	2	0	.000	0	0

=== Pitching ===
==== Starting pitchers ====
Note: G = Games pitched; IP = Innings pitched; W = Wins; L = Losses; ERA = Earned run average; SO = Strikeouts

Player	G	IP	W	L	ERA	SO
Vern Kennedy	33	190.1	12	9	5.06	53
George Gill	24	164.0	12	9	4.12	30
Elden Auker	27	160.2	11	10	5.27	46
Tommy Bridges	25	151.0	13	9	4.59	101
Schoolboy Rowe	4	21.0	0	2	3.00	4

==== Other pitchers ====
Note: G = Games pitched; IP = Innings pitched; W = Wins; L = Losses; ERA = Earned run average; SO = Strikeouts

Player	G	IP	W	L	ERA	SO
Roxie Lawson	27	127.0	8	9	5.46	39
Harry Eisenstat	32	125.1	9	6	3.72	37
Boots Poffenberger	25	125.0	6	7	4.82	28
Al Benton	19	95.1	5	3	3.30	33
Bob Harris	3	10.0	1	0	7.20	7

==== Relief pitchers ====
Note: G = Games pitched; W = Wins; L = Losses; SV = Saves; ERA = Earned run average; SO = Strikeouts

Player	G	W	L	SV	ERA	SO
Slick Coffman	39	4	4	2	6.02	31
Jake Wade	27	3	2	0	6.56	23
Joe Rogalski	2	0	0	0	2.57	2
Woody Davis	2	0	0	0	1.50	1

== Awards and honors ==
- Hank Greenberg finished third in the American League MVP voting.

== Farm system ==
Level	Team	League	Manager
A1	Beaumont Exporters	Texas League	Al Vincent
C	Charleston Senators	Middle Atlantic League	Paul O'Malley
D	Andalusia Bulldogs	Alabama–Florida League	Yam Yaryan
D	Beckley Bengals	Mountain State League	Eli Harris
D	Tiffin Mud Hens	Ohio State League	Tony Rogala
D	Harlingen Hubs	Texas Valley League	Jake Atz
D	Hobbs Boosters	West Texas–New Mexico League	Neal Rabe

LEAGUE CHAMPIONS: Beaumont, Beckley, Harlingen
