= Charley Suche =

American baseball player (1915–1984)

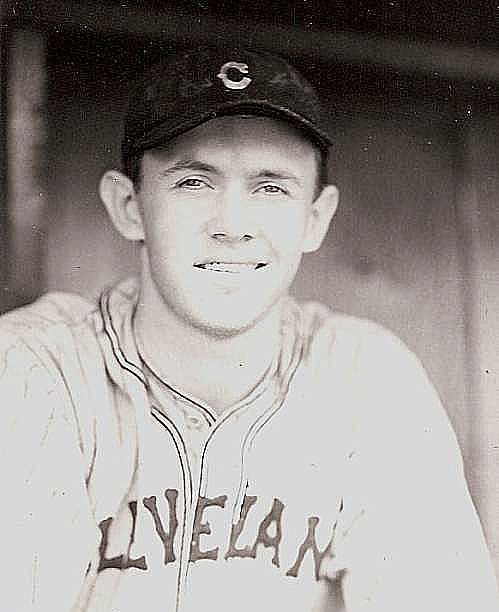
- Suche in 1938
- Pitcher
- Born: August 15, 1915; Cranes Mills, Texas, U.S.
- Died: February 11, 1984 (aged 68); San Antonio, Texas, U.S.
- Batted: Right Threw: Left

MLB debut
- September 18, 1938, for the Cleveland Indians

Last MLB appearance
- September 18, 1938, for the Cleveland Indians

MLB statistics
- Innings pitched: 1.1
- Earned run average: 27.00
- Strikeouts: 1
- Stats at Baseball Reference

Teams
- Cleveland Indians (1938)

Charles Morris Suche (August 15, 1915 – February 11, 1984) was an American Major League Baseball pitcher who played for one season. He played for the Cleveland Indians for one game on September 18 during the 1938 Cleveland Indians season.
