= Dave Smith (pitcher, born 1914) =

American baseball player

- Pitcher
- Born: December 17, 1914; Sellers, South Carolina, U.S.
- Died: April 1, 1998 (aged 83); Whiteville, North Carolina, U.S.
- Batted: Right Threw: Right

MLB debut
- June 16, 1938, for the Philadelphia Athletics

Last MLB appearance
- April 23, 1939, for the Philadelphia Athletics

MLB statistics
- Win–loss record: 2–1
- Earned run average: 5.08
- Strikeouts: 13
- Stats at Baseball Reference

Teams
- Philadelphia Athletics (1938–1939)

David Merwin Smith (December 17, 1914 – April 1, 1998) was an American Major League Baseball pitcher who played in 1938 and 1939 with the Philadelphia Athletics. He batted and threw right-handed.
