= Irv Bartling =

American baseball player (1914-1973)

- Shortstop / Third baseman
- Born: June 27, 1914; Bay City, Michigan, U.S.
- Died: June 12, 1973 (aged 58); Westland, Michigan, U.S.
- Batted: Right Threw: Right

MLB debut
- September 8, 1938, for the Philadelphia Athletics

Last MLB appearance
- September 29, 1938, for the Philadelphia Athletics

MLB statistics
- Batting average: .174
- Fielding percentage: .914
- Putouts: 29
- Stats at Baseball Reference

Teams
- Philadelphia Athletics (1938)

Henry Irving Bartling (June 27, 1914 – June 12, 1973) was an American Major League Baseball infielder. He played for the Philadelphia Athletics during the 1938 season. Bartling attended Michigan State University.
