= 1938 in baseball =

The following are the baseball events of the year 1938 throughout the world.

== Champions ==
=== Major League Baseball ===
- World Series: New York Yankees over Chicago Cubs (4–0)
- All-Star Game, July 6 at Crosley Field: National League, 4–1

=== Other champions ===
- I Amateur World Series: Great Britain
- Negro League Baseball All-Star Game: West, 5–4
- Central American and Caribbean Games: Cuba
- Bolivarian Games: Venezuela

== Awards and honors ==
- Baseball Hall of Fame
  - Grover Cleveland Alexander
  - Alexander Cartwright
  - Henry Chadwick
- Most Valuable Player
  - Jimmie Foxx, Boston Red Sox, 1B (AL)
  - Ernie Lombardi, Cincinnati Reds, C (NL)
- The Sporting News Player of the Year Award
  - Johnny Vander Meer, Cincinnati Reds, P
- The Sporting News Manager of the Year Award
  - Joe McCarthy, New York Yankees

== Statistical leaders ==
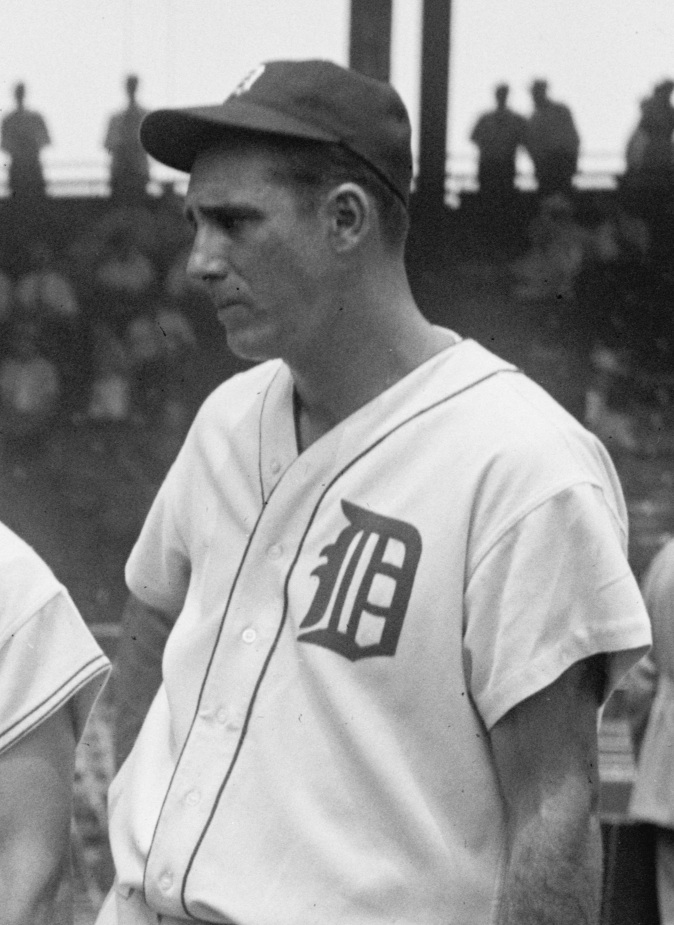
Hank Greenberg, Hall of Famer and 2-time MVP

	American League		National League		Negro American League		Negro National League	
Stat	Player	Total	Player	Total	Player	Total	Player	Total
AVG	Jimmie Foxx (BOS)	.349	Ernie Lombardi (CIN)	.342	David Whatley (MEM/BBB)	.396	Buck Leonard (HOM)	.420
HR	Hank Greenberg (DET)	58	Mel Ott (NYG)	36	Willard Brown (KCM)	7	Josh Gibson (HOM)	13
RBI	Jimmie Foxx (BOS)	175	Joe Medwick (STL)	122	Willard Brown (KCM)	48	Josh Gibson (HOM)	54
W	Red Ruffing (NYY)	21	Bill Lee (CHC)	22	Willie Cornelius (CAG); Hilton Smith^{1} (KCM)	9	Ray Brown^{2} (HOM)	14
ERA	Lefty Grove (BOS)	3.08	Bill Lee (CHC)	2.66	Hilton Smith^{1} (KCM)	1.92	Ray Brown^{2} (HOM)	1.88
K	Bob Feller (CLE)	240	Clay Bryant (CHC)	135	Hilton Smith^{1} (KCM)	88	Ray Brown^{2} (HOM)	70

^{1} Negro American League Triple Crown pitching winner
^{2} Negro National League Triple Crown pitching winner

== Major league baseball final standings ==
=== American League final standings ===
American League
Team	W	L	Pct.	GB	Home	Road
New York Yankees	99	53	.651	—	55‍–‍22	44‍–‍31
Boston Red Sox	88	61	.591	9½	52‍–‍23	36‍–‍38
Cleveland Indians	86	66	.566	13	46‍–‍30	40‍–‍36
Detroit Tigers	84	70	.545	16	48‍–‍31	36‍–‍39
Washington Senators	75	76	.497	23½	44‍–‍33	31‍–‍43
Chicago White Sox	65	83	.439	32	33‍–‍39	32‍–‍44
St. Louis Browns	55	97	.362	44	31‍–‍43	24‍–‍54
Philadelphia Athletics	53	99	.349	46	28‍–‍47	25‍–‍52

Locations of teams for the 1934–1939 American League seasons
American League

=== National League final standings ===
National League
Team	W	L	Pct.	GB	Home	Road
Chicago Cubs	89	63	.586	—	44‍–‍33	45‍–‍30
Pittsburgh Pirates	86	64	.573	2	44‍–‍33	42‍–‍31
New York Giants	83	67	.553	5	43‍–‍30	40‍–‍37
Cincinnati Reds	82	68	.547	6	43‍–‍34	39‍–‍34
Boston Bees	77	75	.507	12	45‍–‍30	32‍–‍45
St. Louis Cardinals	71	80	.470	17½	36‍–‍41	35‍–‍39
Brooklyn Dodgers	69	80	.463	18½	31‍–‍41	38‍–‍39
Philadelphia Phillies	45	105	.300	43	26‍–‍48	19‍–‍57

Locations of teams for the 1938–1940 National League seasons
National League

== Negro leagues final standings ==
All Negro leagues standings below are per Seamheads.

=== Negro American League final standings ===
vs. Negro American League						vs. Major Black teams			
Negro American League	W	L	T	Pct.	GB	W	L	T	Pct.
^{(1)} Memphis Red Sox	39	23	1	.627	—	48	37	1	.564
Kansas City Monarchs	42	27	1	.607	½	50	36	1	.580
^{(2)} Atlanta Black Crackers	30	29	0	.508	7½	34	38	0	.472
Indianapolis ABCs	20	22	1	.477	9	20	22	1	.477
Chicago American Giants	32	35	2	.478	9½	42	43	3	.494
Jacksonville Red Caps	11	13	1	.460	9	14	19	2	.429
Birmingham Black Barons	11	36	0	.234	20½	12	46	0	.207

^{(1)} First half champion ^{(2)} Second half champion

Locations of teams for the 1938 Negro American League season
Negro American League

==== Negro American League postseason ====
Memphis beat Atlanta 2 games to 0 games in a contested play-off. At the league's winter meetings it was decided that the Red Sox had won the Negro American League pennant due to Memphis' two wins and the forfeiture of Atlanta in game three of the series.

=== Negro National League final standings ===
vs. Negro National League						vs. Major Black teams			
Negro National League	W	L	T	Pct.	GB	W	L	T	Pct.
Homestead Grays	47	17	0	.734	—	67	22	0	.753
Baltimore Elite Giants	25	23	2	.514	14	37	28	3	.566
Philadelphia Stars	37	28	2	.567	10½	45	38	3	.541
Pittsburgh Crawfords	28	27	0	.509	14½	35	33	1	.514
Newark Eagles	20	28	0	.417	19	24	29	0	.453
New York Black Yankees	11	28	0	.282	23½	13	32	1	.293
Washington Black Senators	1	18	0	.053	23½	2	20	0	.091

Locations of teams for the 1938 Negro National League season
Negro National League

== Events ==
=== January–May ===
- February 10 – The St. Louis Browns trade Rollie Hemsley to the Cleveland Indians for Ed Cole, Roy Hughes and Billy Sullivan.
- March 6 – The Philadelphia Phillies trade Dolph Camilli to the Brooklyn Dodgers for Eddie Morgan and $45,000.
- April 3 – Goose Goslin joins the Washington Senators.
- April 16 – The St. Louis Cardinals trade Dizzy Dean to the Chicago Cubs for Curt Davis, Clyde Shoun, Tuck Stainback and $185,000.
- April 18 – The Boston Red Sox defeat the New York Yankees in the season opener at Fenway Park. Hall of famer Joe Gordon makes his major league debut at second base for the Yankees.
- April 19
  - Heinie Mueller of the Philadelphia Phillies and Ernie Koy of the Brooklyn Dodgers each hit a home run in their first Major League Baseball at-bats, as Brooklyn defeats Philadelphia, 12–5, at the Baker Bowl.
  - Enos Slaughter goes three-for-five in his major league debut with a double and a strike out.
  - Fritz Ostermueller holds the New York Yankees to just two hits, as the Boston Red Sox shutout the Yanks, 6–0.
- April 24 – Dizzy Dean holds his former team to just four hits, as the Cubs beat the Cardinals, 4–0.
- May 5 – The Chicago Cubs defeat the Philadelphia Phillies 21–2 at Wrigley Field.
- May 6 – At International League, Newark Bears outfielder Bob Seeds hits four home runs in four successive innings and drives in 12 runs against the Buffalo Bisons. The next day, Seeds slams three more. His seven homers in the two-day barrage account for 17 runs batted in and 30 total bases. In his first 59 games‚ Seeds will clout 28 HR with 95 RBI.
- May 14 – The Philadelphia Athletics acquire Dick Siebert from the St. Louis Cardinals in exchange for Paul Easterling, Gene Hasson and George Turbeville.

=== June–July ===
- June 5 – The Chicago White Sox win the first game of a double header with the Philadelphia Athletics, 8–2, to snap a ten-game losing streak.
- June 6 – The Cincinnati Reds sent Alex Kampouris to the New York Giants in exchange for Wally Berger.
- June 11 – Cincinnati Reds pitcher Johnny Vander Meer tosses a no-hitter against the Boston Bees, leading his team to a 3–0 win.
- June 13 – The Philadelphia Phillies sent Bucky Walters to the Cincinnati Reds in exchange for Spud Davis, Al Hollingsworth and $50,000.
- June 15 – Johnny Vander Meer becomes the first, and only to date, pitcher in Major League history to throw two consecutive no-hitters as the Cincinnati Reds blank the Brooklyn Dodgers, 6–0.
- June 18:
  - Babe Ruth signs a contract to coach with the Brooklyn Dodgers. Ruth dons a Dodger uniform the next day, entertains observers with a batting demonstration, and works the third-base coaching box for the remainder of the season.
  - Lefty Mills of the St. Louis Browns pitches a 1–0 shutout over the New York Yankees. It is the second of only two shut outs the Yankees endure all season.
- June 22 - The Tigers Vern Kennedy fans Pinky Higgins in his first-at-bat, ending his consecutive hit streak at 12.
- June 26 – Carl Hubbell wins his 200th career game‚ as the New York Giants beat the visiting Chicago Cubs, 5–1, and stretch their National League lead over the second-place Cincinnati Reds to two games. Larry French takes the loss, while newly acquired Bob Seeds‚ up from Newark‚ leads the way with a 470-foot inside-the-park home run.
- June 30 – In their final game at the Baker Bowl, The Philadelphia Phillies lose to the New York Giants 14–1. Giants outfielder Hank Leiber hit the final home run in the history of the 51 year old stadium.
- July 6 – At Crosley Field, home of the Cincinnati Reds, the National League defeats the American League, 4–1, in the All-Star Game.
- July 12 – The Pittsburgh Pirates complete a thirteen-game winning streak to pull themselves within half a game of the first place New York Giants.
- July 16 – The St. Louis Browns snap a ten-game losing streak with an 8–3 victory over the Boston Red Sox.
- July 29 – Jake Powell is interviewed by WGN's Bob Elson. When asked about his work as a police office in Dayton Ohio, Powell brags that he "beats n*****s in the head". Commissioner Landis suspends Powell for the comments.

=== August–September ===
- August 2 – The Brooklyn Dodgers and the St. Louis Cardinals used a yellow baseball in the first game of a doubleheader as an experiment. The two teams went back to the white ball in the second game as the Dodgers swept the doubleheader 6–2 and 9–3.
- August 7 – Mickey Cochrane is replaced as manager of the Detroit Tigers by Del Baker.
- August 9 – The Philadelphia A's send Bill Nicholson and $30,000 to the Washington Senators for Dee Miles.
- August 10 – The New York Yankees trade Eddie Miller to the Boston Bees for Gil English, Johnny Riddle, cash and four players to be named later. On February 4, 1939, the Yankees receive Joe DiMaggio's brother, Vince to complete the trade.
- August 20 – Cleveland Indians catchers Hank Helf and Frank Pytlak break the "all-time altitude mark" by catching baseballs dropped from the 708-foot Cleveland Terminal Tower.
- August 22 – Preacher Roe makes his major league debut for the St. Louis Cardinals. He lasts just 2.2 innings and gives up four earned runs. He doesn't pitch in the major leagues again until 1944 with the Pittsburgh Pirates.
- August 27 – In the second game of a doubleheader, Monte Pearson pitches a no-hitter as the New York Yankees crush the Cleveland Indians, 13–0.
- September 7: It's Joe Cronin day at Fenway Park, but Jimmie Foxx steals the spotlight with eight RBI in an 11-4 victory over the visiting Yankees.
- September 9:
  - Lou Boudreau makes his major league debut for the Cleveland Indians in an 11–5 loss to the Detroit Tigers.
  - The Cincinnati Reds sell Jake Mooty and Jimmy Outlaw to the Brooklyn Dodgers. Five days later (September 14), Commissioner Landis voids the deal, making both players eligible for the draft. Outlaw is drafted by the St. Louis Cardinals in the 1938 rule 5 draft on October 5, and traded to the Dodgers for Lew Krausse and cash on December 13. Brooklyn then packages him with Buddy Hassett, and send him to the Boston Bees for Ira Hutchinson and Gene Moore the same day. Mooty isn't drafted until October 3, 1939, by the Chicago Cubs from Syracuse (International).
- September 10 – At the Polo Grounds, the New York Giants defeat the Brooklyn Dodgers, 20–2.
- September 30 – The Chicago Cubs and St. Louis Cardinals play to a 7–7 tie. The tie breaks the Cubs' ten-game winning streak that sees them go from 3.5 games back of the Pittsburgh Pirates to first place in the National League.

=== October–December ===
- October 5 – Red Ruffing and the New York Yankees take game one of the 1938 World Series, 3–1, over the Chicago Cubs at Wrigley Field.
- October 6 – The Cubs jump out to a 1–0, then 3–2 lead against the Yankees, however, two run home runs by Frankie Crosetti and Joe DiMaggio in the eighth and ninth inning, respectively, give the Yankees the 6–3 victory.
- October 8 – With two outs and no one on base, a two out rally in the fifth inning plates two runs, as the New York Yankees take game three of the World Series, 5–2.
- October 9 – The New York Yankees defeat the Chicago Cubs, 8–3, in Game four of the World Series to win a record third consecutive World Championship, and seventh overall, four games to none.
- November 1 – National League batting champ Ernie Lombardi of the Cincinnati Reds is named the Most Valuable Player. Chicago Cubs pitcher Bill Lee is the runner-up.
- November 2 – Boston Red Sox first baseman Jimmie Foxx is voted Most Valuable Player of the American League for the third time, with New York Yankees catcher Bill Dickey second in the voting.
- November 28 – The Chicago White Sox 25-year-old pitching star Monty Stratton has his right leg amputated as a result of a hunting accident. Stratton attempted comeback is chronicled in The Stratton Story, with James Stewart in the title role.
- December 6 – The Chicago Cubs trade Frank Demaree, Billy Jurges and Ken O'Dea to the New York Giants for Dick Bartell, Hank Leiber and Gus Mancuso.
- December 14 – Major League Baseball teams adopt several resolutions. The National League allows the Cincinnati Reds to play their season opener one day before other teams, as a way of honoring the 100th anniversary of baseball and of the 1869 Red Stockings being the first professional team. In other news, Will Harridge is re-elected American League president and given a 10-year term. The AL permits the Cleveland Indians and Philadelphia Athletics to play night games. Finally, MLB agree on a standard ball but disagree on increasing rosters from 23 to 25 players. Judge Landis will eventually decide on 25.
- December 15 – The Boston Red Sox trade Ben Chapman to the Cleveland Indians for Denny Galehouse and Tommy Irwin, trade Pinky Higgins and Archie McKain to the Detroit Tigers for Elden Auker, Chet Morgan and Jake Wade, and sell Bill Harris' contract to the New York Giants.
- December 16 – The Boston Bees trade Ray Mueller to the Pittsburgh Pirates for Johnny Dickshot and Al Todd.

== Births ==
=== January ===
- January 7 – Fred Whitfield
- January 10 – Willie McCovey
- January 16 – Ron Herbel
- January 18 – Curt Flood
- January 23 – Bob Moorhead

=== February ===
- February 2 – Max Alvis
- February 7 – Johnny Werhas
- February 13 – Dick Hughes
- February 15 – Chuck Estrada
- February 18 – Manny Mota
- February 19 – Bob Sadowski
- February 22 – Steve Barber

=== March ===
- March 3 – Tetsuya Yoneda
- March 5 – Larry Elliot
- March 15 – Bob Locker
- March 16 – Cal Browning
- March 17 – Jimmie Hall
- March 23 – Sam Bowens
- March 25 – Alan Koch
- March 30 – Dave Baldwin
- March 31:
  - John Herrnstein
  - Moose Stubing

=== April ===
- April 2 – Al Weis
- April 4 – A. Bartlett Giamatti
- April 5:
  - Ron Hansen
  - Don Prince
- April 8 – Tom Butters
- April 11 – Art Quirk
- April 16 – Rich Rollins
- April 18 – Rogelio Álvarez
- April 20 – Jim Dickson
- April 22 – John Orsino

=== May ===
- May 3 – Chris Cannizzaro
- May 4 – Howie Koplitz
- May 10 – Merritt Ranew
- May 12 – Norm Gigon
- May 15 – Al McBean
- May 27 – Fred Bruckbauer
- May 29:
  - Fay Vincent
  - Dale Willis
- May 31 – Ray Washburn

=== June ===
- June 2:
  - Lee Gregory
  - Gene Michael
- June 4 – Art Mahaffey
- June 10 – Johnny Edwards
- June 15 – Billy Williams
- June 19 – Bob Aspromonte
- June 24 – Don Mincher
- June 27 – Elmo Plaskett
- June 28 – Orlando McFarlane

=== July ===
- July 1 – Craig Anderson
- July 2:
  - Don Choate
  - Hal Reniff
- July 6:
  - John Boozer
  - Barry Shetrone
- July 7 – Bob Lipski
- July 8 – Bill Spanswick
- July 10 – Mike Brumley
- July 11 – Ted Schreiber
- July 12 – Ron Fairly
- July 13 – Don Pavletich
- July 16 – Bob Burda
- July 17 – Deron Johnson
- July 19 – Gordie Richardson
- July 20 – Tony Oliva
- July 27 – Harry Wendelstedt
- July 29 – Don Wert

=== August ===
- August 4 – Ray Oyler
- August 11 – Vada Pinson
- August 16 – Buck Rodgers
- August 17 – Dick Lines
- August 27 – Joe McCabe
- August 28:
  - Billy Cowan
  - Dick LeMay

=== September ===
- September 1 – Merlin Nippert
- September 8 – George Werley
- September 9 – Jay Ward
- September 13 – Bob Heffner
- September 14 – Frank Carpin
- September 15 – Gaylord Perry
- September 17 – Bobby Wine
- September 20 – Tom Tresh
- September 24 – George Banks
- September 27 – Alex George
- September 29 – Mike McCormick

=== October ===
- October 2 – Mike de la Hoz
- October 3 – Patricia Roy
- October 11 – Bill Roman
- October 13 – Ron Moeller
- October 18 – Bobby Knoop
- October 19 – Vic Roznovsky
- October 31 – Jim Donohue

=== November ===
- November 5 – Ed Olivares
- November 6 – Mack Jones
- November 7:
  - Jake Gibbs
  - Jim Kaat
- November 14 – Johnnie Seale
- November 17 – Aubrey Gatewood
- November 18 – Bud Zipfel
- November 19:
  - Manny Jiménez
  - Ted Turner
- November 20 – Herm Starrette
- November 27:
  - Vern Handrahan
  - José Tartabull

=== December ===
- December 4 – Billy Bryan
- December 5:
  - Al Moran
  - Chico Ruiz
- December 6 – Amado Samuel
- December 14 – Ken Hunt
- December 17 – Leo Cárdenas
- December 18 – Mike White
- December 22 – Matty Alou
- December 24 – Bobby Henrich
- December 25 – Jack Hamilton

== Deaths ==
=== January ===
- January 1 – Frank Sexton, 65, pitcher for the 1895 Boston Beaneaters of the National League.
- January 12 – Dupee Shaw, 78, pitcher who played six seasons. Won 30 games and struck out 451 batters in 1884.
- January 16:
  - Earl Clark, 30, backup outfielder who hit .291 in 293 games for the Boston Braves and St. Louis Browns from 1927 to 1934.
  - Joe Sommer, 79, infielder/outfielder between 1880 and 1890, most prominently for the Baltimore Orioles of the American Association.
- January 19 – Bill Everitt, 69, infielder who played from 1895 through 1901 for the Chicago Colts/Orphans and the Washington Senators.
- January 20 – Herb Goodall, 67, pitcher for the 1890 Louisville Colonels of the American Association.
- January 24 – Jim Mutrie, 86, manager who led New York Metropolitans to the American Association title in 1884, then won pennants in 1888 and 1889 after moving to NY's NL franchise – which he renamed by marveling over his "Giants"; career .611 winning percentage was best of 19th century.
- January 27 – Larry Battam, 61, third baseman for the 1895 New York Giants of the National League.
- January 28:
  - Bill Hill, 63, pitcher who played from 1896 to 1899 for five different National League clubs.
  - Pop Rising, 56, outfielder for the 1905 Boston Americans.
- January 31:
  - Charlie Chech, 59, pitcher for the Cincinnati Reds, Cleveland Naps and Boston Red Sox between 1905 and 1909.
  - Jim Gray, 75, infielder who played for the Pittsburgh Alleghenys/Burghers/Pirates between 1884 and 1893.

=== February ===
- February 3 – Mike Donovan, 56, third baseman for the Cleveland Naps in 1904 and the New York Highlanders in 1908.
- February 9 – Charlie Daniels, 76, pitcher for the 1884 Boston Reds of the Union Association.
- February 16 – Lee Tannehill, 57, infielder for the Chicago White Sox from 1903 to 1912, who is credited as the first player to hit a home run in the original Comiskey Park.
- February 21 – George Merritt, 57, outfielder who played from 1903 through 1905 for the Pittsburgh Pirates.
- February 22 – Mert Hackett, 78, catcher for five seasons, including the 1883 National League champions, the Boston Beaneaters.
- February 26 – Tex Jones, 53, played nine games for the Chicago White Sox in 1911.

=== March ===
- March 2 – Walter Prince, 76, first baseman who played from 1883 to 1884 for the Louisville Eclipse, Detroit Wolverines and Washington Nationals.
- March 4 – Jack Taylor, 64, pitcher for the Chicago Orphans/Cubs and St. Louis Cardinals from 1898 to 1907, who won twenty or more games in four seasons, hurled 187 consecutive complete games between 1901 and 1906, and was a member of the world champion 1907 Cubs.
- March 6 – Rube Lutzke, 40, third baseman for the Cleveland Indians from 1923 to 1927, who led the American League in putouts and assists in the 1923 season.
- March 7 – Stephen McKeever, 84, co-owner of the Brooklyn Dodgers since 1912 and club president since 1932; his heirs would maintain his 25 percent share in the team until 1975.
- March 13 – Rube Ellis, 52, left fielder who hit .260 in 555 games for the St. Louis Cardinals from 1909 to 1912.
- March 18:
  - Hobe Ferris, 60, lowest ever career on-base percentage; committed first ever error in a World Series game.
  - Milo Netzel, 51, third baseman/left fielder for the 1909 Cleveland Naps of the American League.
- March 20 – Bob Fothergill, 40, rotund left fielder for the Detroit Tigers, Chicago White Sox and Boston Red Sox from 1922 to 1933, whose .325 career average ranks him for 41st place on the Major League all-time list.
- March 24 – Joe Dolan, 65, backup infielder for the Colonels, Phillies and Athletics between the 1896 and 1901 seasons.
- March 25 – Al Burris, 64, pitcher for the 1894 Philadelphia Phillies.
- March 26 – Harry Hempstead, 69, owner of the New York Giants from 1912 to 1919; son-in-law of John T. Brush.
- March 29 – Tillinghast L'Hommedieu Huston, 70, civil engineer and businessman who was the co-owner, with Jacob Ruppert, of the New York Yankees from 1915 to 1923.
- March 30 – Dasher Troy, 81, second baseman for five seasons, most notably for the 1884 American Association champs, the New York Metropolitans.

=== April ===
- April 3:
  - Charlie Brown, 66, pitcher for the 1897 Cleveland Spiders of the National League.
  - Count Campau, 74, outfielder for three seasons (1888, 1890, 1894); in 1890, led the then-major-league American Association in home runs (nine) in 1890 and managed St. Louis Browns to a 27–14 record between June 28 and August 23; prolific base stealer in minor leagues.
- April 6 – J. B. Young, 80, pitcher who appeared in one game with the 1892 St. Louis Browns of the National League.
- April 11 – Cristóbal Torriente, 44, All-Star Cuban right fielder in the Negro leagues who batted .339 lifetime.
- April 17 – Alex Beam, 68, pitcher for the 1889 Pittsburgh Alleghenys of the National League.
- April 20 – Tim O'Rourke, 73, backup infielder who played from 1890 through 1894 for the Syracuse Stars, Columbus Solons, Baltimore Orioles, Louisville Colonels and St. Louis Browns.
- April 30 – Sun Daly, 73, outfielder for the 1892 Baltimore Orioles, who earned his nickname because he never wore sun glasses.

=== May ===
- May 11 – Buzz Murphy, 43, outfielder who played from 1918 to 1919 with the Boston Braves and the Washington Senators.
- May 21:
  - Sam Childs, 76, first baseman for the 1883 Columbus Buckeyes of the American Association.
  - Silver King, 70, pitcher who had three 30-win seasons for the 1887–89 St. Louis Browns and another for the 1890 Chicago team in the Players' League, who is regarded as the first sidearm pitcher.
- May 22 – Harry Lumley, 57, right fielder and manager who spent his entire career with the Brooklyn Superbas in the National League from 1904 to 1910, while leading the league with 18 triples and nine home runs during his rookie season.

=== June ===
- June 12:
  - Josh Reilly, 70, second baseman for the 1896 Chicago Colts of the National League, who later managed in the minor leagues.
  - Buck Thrasher, 48, right fielder who hit .255 in 30 games with the Philadelphia Athletics from 1916 to 1917.
- June 20 – Pat Newnam, 57, first baseman who played from 1910 to 1911 for the St. Louis Browns of the American League.
- June 25 – Bumpus Jones, 68, pitcher for the Cincinnati Reds and New York Giants from 1892 to 1893, who hurled a no-hitter against the Pittsburgh Pirates in the 1892 season.
- June 27 – Jerry Donovan, 61, backup catcher for the 1906 Philadelphia Phillies.

=== July ===
- July 4 – Chief Roseman, 82, outfielder for six different teams between 1882 and 1890, who also managed the St. Louis Browns in his last major league season.
- July 9 – George Dickerson, 46, pitcher for the Cleveland Indians in the 1917 season.
- July 21 – Carl Spongberg, 54, pitcher for the 1908 Chicago Cubs.
- July 27 – Milt Reed, 48, shortstop/second baseman who played between 1911 and 1914 with the Cardinals and Phillies, and for the Brooklyn Tip-Tops of the Federal League in 1915.
- July 31:
  - Bill Carney, 64, right fielder who played briefly for the Chicago Cubs in the 1904 season.
  - Doc Miller, 55, Canadian outfielder who posted a .295 average from 1910 through 1914 for the Chicago Cubs, Boston Doves/Rustlers/Braves, Philadelphia Phillies and Cincinnati Reds, while leading the National League with 192 hits in the 1912 season.

=== August ===
- August 1:
  - Al Munro Elias, 67, who along with his brother Walter founded in 1913 the Elias Sports Bureau, official statistician of the National League.
  - Tug Thompson, 81, Canadian outfielder/catcher for the 1882 Cincinnati Red Stockings and the 1884 Indianapolis Hoosiers, and a member of the 1882 American Association Champion team.
- August 2 – Jim Curry, 52, second baseman who played in part of three seasons for the Philadelphia Athletics, New York Highlanders and Detroit Tigers.
- August 11 – Cliff Hill, 45, pitcher for the Philadelphia Athletics during the 1917 season.
- August 30 – Gene Moore, 52, pitcher who posted a 2–2 record and a 4.76 ERA for the Pittsburgh Pirates and Cincinnati Reds between 1909 and 1912.

=== September ===
- September 7 – Lee King, 44, outfielder for the Philadelphia Athletics (1916) and the Boston Braves (1919).
- September 19 – Pink Hawley, 72, pitcher who posted a 167–179 record and a 3.96 ERA in 393 games with the Browns, Pirates, Reds, Giants and Brewers from 1892 to 1901.
- September 27 – Cy Ferry, 60, pitcher who played from 1904 to 1905 for the Detroit Tigers and Cleveland Naps of the American League.
- September 28 – Bill Rollinson, 82, catcher for the 1884 Washington Nationals of the Union Association.

=== October ===
- October 3 – Morgan Murphy, 71, catcher and noted sign stealer for 11 seasons, from 1890 to 1901.
- October 4 – Fred Doe, 74, pitcher who played for the Pittsburgh Burghers and the Buffalo Bisons of the Players' League during the 1890 season.
- October 16 – Joe Knight, 79, Canadian-born outfielder who finished sixth in the 1890 National League batting race with a .312 average.
- October 24 – George Borchers, 69, pitcher for the Chicago White Stockings (1888) and the Louisville Colonels (1895).
- October 29:
  - Tom Daly, 72, catcher/second baseman for five teams of three different leagues, who posted a .278 average in 1568 career games played between 1884 and 1903.
  - Babe Towne, 58, backup catcher for the 1906 Chicago White Sox.

=== November ===
- November 1 – Charles Weeghman, 64, owner of the Chicago Whales of the "outlaw" Federal League (1914–1915) and Chicago Cubs (1916–1919); builder of what would become Wrigley Field.
- November 3 – Milt Scott, 77, first baseman who played between 1882 and 1886 for the Chicago White Stockings, Detroit Wolverines, Pittsburgh Alleghenys and Baltimore Orioles.
- November 10 – Chet Spencer, 55, outfielder for the 1906 Boston Beaneaters of the National League.
- November 11 – Fred Hartman, 70, third baseman who posted a .278 average and 333 RBI between 1894 and 1902 for the Pirates, Browns, Giants, White Sox and Cardinals.
- November 12 – Andy Harrington, 49, pitcher who played for the Cincinnati Reds in the 1913 season.
- November 14 – Les Nunamaker, 49, catcher for the Red Sox, Yankees, Browns and Indians from 1911 to 1922, who in 1914 threw out three baserunners attempting to steal in the same inning, to become the only 20th-century catcher to accomplish this feat at major league level.
- November 21 – Polly Wolfe, 50, backup outfielder who played in 1912 and 1914 for the Chicago White Sox.

=== December ===
- December 3 – Guy Hecker, 82, American Association pitcher/first baseman who won the Triple Crown as a pitcher in 1884 and a batting title in 1886 while hurling a no-hitter in 1882; one of two pitchers to hit three home runs in a single game (along Jim Tobin) and the only pitcher in Major League Baseball history to collect six hits in a nine-inning game.
- December 7 – Tom Kearns, 79, second baseman/catcher who played between 1880 and 1884 for the Buffalo Bisons and Detroit Wolverines.
- December 19 – Art Griggs, 54, first baseman/outfielder for the Browns, Naps, Tip-Tops and Tigers between the 1909 and 1918 seasons.
- December 24:
  - Luke Lutenberg, 74, first baseman for the 1894 Louisville Colonels.
  - Bill Yohe, 60, first baseman who played for the Washington Senators of the American League during the 1909 season.
