= 1938 St. Louis Browns season =

Major League Baseball season

1938 St. Louis Browns
- League: American League
- Ballpark: Sportsman's Park
- City: St. Louis, Missouri
- Record: 55–97 (.362)
- League place: 7th
- Owners: Donald Lee Barnes
- General managers: Bill DeWitt
- Managers: Gabby Street and Ski Melillo
- Radio: KMOX (France Laux, Jim Alt); KWK (Johnny O'Hara, Allan Anthony)

The 1938 St. Louis Browns season involved the Browns finishing 7th in the American League with a record of 55 wins and 97 losses.

== Offseason ==
- December 1, 1937: Elon Hogsett was traded by the Browns to the Washington Senators for Ed Linke.
- December 2, 1937: Joe Vosmik was traded by the Browns to the Boston Red Sox for Red Kress, Buster Mills and Bobo Newsom.

== Regular season ==
=== Season standings ===
American League
Team	W	L	Pct.	GB	Home	Road
New York Yankees	99	53	.651	—	55‍–‍22	44‍–‍31
Boston Red Sox	88	61	.591	9½	52‍–‍23	36‍–‍38
Cleveland Indians	86	66	.566	13	46‍–‍30	40‍–‍36
Detroit Tigers	84	70	.545	16	48‍–‍31	36‍–‍39
Washington Senators	75	76	.497	23½	44‍–‍33	31‍–‍43
Chicago White Sox	65	83	.439	32	33‍–‍39	32‍–‍44
St. Louis Browns	55	97	.362	44	31‍–‍43	24‍–‍54
Philadelphia Athletics	53	99	.349	46	28‍–‍47	25‍–‍52

=== Record vs. opponents ===
1938 American League record Sources:
Team	BOS	CWS	CLE	DET	NYY	PHA	SLB	WSH
Boston	—	12–6	12–10	10–12	11–11–1	14–8	17–5	12–9
Chicago	6–12	—	9–13	7–15	8–14	12–10	13–8–1	10–11
Cleveland	10–12	13–9	—	12–10	8–13	18–4	13–9–1	12–9
Detroit	12–10	15–7	10–12	—	8–14	14–8	12–10–1	13–9
New York	11–11–1	14–8	13–8	14–8	—	16–5–2	15–7–1	16–6–1
Philadelphia	8–14	10–12	4–18	8–14	5–16–2	—	12–9	6–16
St. Louis	5–17	8–13–1	9–13–1	10–12–1	7–15–1	9–12	—	7–15
Washington	9–12	11–10	9–12	9–13	6–16–1	16–6	15–7	—

=== Opening Day lineup ===
- Mel Mazzera, LF
- Billy Sullivan Jr., C
- Sam West, CF
- Beau Bell, 3B
- Harlond Clift, 3B
- Red Kress, SS
- George McQuinn, 1B
- Don Heffner, 2B
- Bobo Newsom, P

=== Notable transactions ===
- June 11, 1938: Jack Knott was traded by the Browns to the Chicago White Sox in exchange for Bill Cox.
- September 8, 1938: Joe Grace was purchased by the Browns from the Memphis Chicks (Southern Association).

=== Roster ===
1938 St. Louis Browns
Roster
Pitchers: 20 Emil Bildilli; 27 Julio Bonetti; 26 Ed Cole; 17 Bill Cox; 18 Oral Hildebrand; 16 Fred Johnson; 23 Harry Kimberlin; 17 Jack Knott; 20 Glenn Liebhardt; 22 Ed Linke; 25 Lefty Mills; 12 Bobo Newsom; 20 Vito Tamulis; 19 Les Tietje; -- Bill Trotter; 21 Russ Van Atta; 24 Jim Walkup; -- Jim Weaver	Catchers: 4,8 Sam Harshany; 9 Tommy Heath; 2 Billy Sullivan; Infielders: 7 Harlond Clift; -- Sig Gryska; 1 Don Heffner; 11 Roy Hughes; 3 Red Kress; 23 Johnny Lucadello; 5 George McQuinn	Outfielders: 8 Ethan Allen; 6 Mel Almada; 10 Beau Bell; 30 Joe Grace; 14 Mel Mazzera; 4 Glenn McQuillen; 15 Buster Mills; 6 Sam West	Manager: 29 Ski Melillo; 31 Gabby Street; Coaches: 28 Fred Hofmann; 29 Ski Melillo

== Player stats ==
=== Batting ===
==== Starters by position ====
Note: Pos = Position; G = Games played; AB = At bats; H = Hits; Avg. = Batting average; HR = Home runs; RBI = Runs batted in

Pos	Player	G	AB	H	Avg.	HR	RBI
C	Billy Sullivan	111	375	104	.277	7	49
1B	George McQuinn	148	602	195	.324	12	82
2B	Don Heffner	141	473	116	.245	2	69
SS	Red Kress	150	566	171	.302	7	79
3B	Harlond Clift	149	534	155	.290	34	118
OF	Mel Almada	102	436	149	.342	3	37
OF	Buster Mills	123	466	133	.285	3	46
OF	Beau Bell	147	526	138	.262	13	84

==== Other batters ====
Note: G = Games played; AB = At bats; H = Hits; Avg. = Batting average; HR = Home runs; RBI = Runs batted in

Player	G	AB	H	Avg.	HR	RBI
Mel Mazzera	86	204	57	.279	6	29
Tommy Heath	70	194	44	.227	2	22
Sam West	44	165	51	.309	1	27
Glenn McQuillen	43	116	33	.284	0	13
Roy Hughes	58	96	27	.281	2	13
Joe Grace	12	47	16	.340	0	4
Ethan Allen	19	33	10	.303	0	4
Sam Harshany	11	24	7	.292	0	0
Sig Gryska	7	21	10	.476	0	4
Johnny Lucadello	7	20	3	.150	0	0

=== Pitching ===
==== Starting pitchers ====
Note: G = Games pitched; IP = Innings pitched; W = Wins; L = Losses; ERA = Earned run average; SO = Strikeouts

Player	G	IP	W	L	ERA	SO
Bobo Newsom	44	329.2	20	16	5.08	226
Lefty Mills	30	210.1	10	12	5.31	134
Oral Hildebrand	23	163.0	8	10	5.69	66
Harry Kimberlin	1	8.0	0	0	3.38	1
Bill Trotter	1	8.0	0	1	5.62	1
Jim Weaver	1	7.0	0	1	9.00	4

==== Other pitchers ====
Note: G = Games pitched; IP = Innings pitched; W = Wins; L = Losses; ERA = Earned run average; SO = Strikeouts

Player	G	IP	W	L	ERA	SO
Russ Van Atta	25	104.0	4	7	6.06	35
Jim Walkup	18	94.0	1	12	6.80	28
Ed Cole	36	88.2	1	5	5.18	26
Fred Johnson	17	69.0	3	7	5.61	24
Bill Cox	22	63.0	1	4	7.00	16
Les Tietje	17	62.0	2	5	7.55	15
Jack Knott	7	30.0	1	2	4.80	8
Emil Bildilli	5	21.2	1	2	7.06	11
Vito Tamulis	3	15.1	0	3	7.63	11

==== Relief pitchers ====
Note: G = Games pitched; W = Wins; L = Losses; SV = Saves; ERA = Earned run average; SO = Strikeouts

Player	G	W	L	SV	ERA	SO
Ed Linke	21	1	7	0	7.94	18
Julio Bonetti	17	2	3	0	6.35	7
Glenn Liebhardt	2	0	0	0	6.00	1

== Farm system ==
Level	Team	League	Manager
AA	Toledo Mud Hens	American Association	Fred Haney
A1	San Antonio Missions	Texas League	Zack Taylor
B	Meridian Scrappers	Southeastern League	Harry Whitehouse
B	Springfield Browns	Illinois–Indiana–Iowa League	Walter Holke
C	Palestine Pals	East Texas League	Abe Miller, Neil Andrews and John Kosey
C	Johnstown Johnnies	Middle Atlantic League	Bobby Goff
D	Pennington Gap Lee Bears	Appalachian League	Ralph Goldsmith and Lynn Lunsford
D	Siloam Springs Travelers	Arkansas–Missouri League	Vince "Moon" Mullen, Runt Marr and Mike Serlick
D	Easton Browns	Eastern Shore League	George Jacobs
D	Lafayette White Sox	Evangeline League	Frank Oceak
D	Mayfield Clothiers	KITTY League	Bennie Tate
D	Lincoln Links	Nebraska State League	Pug Griffin
D	Batesville White Sox	Northeast Arkansas League	Elmer Kirchoff
D	Findlay Browns	Ohio State League	Grover Hartley
D	Beaver Falls Browns	Pennsylvania State Association	Howard Shanks
D	Corpus Christi Spudders	Texas Valley League	Rod Whitney
