= Harry Boyles =

American baseball player (1911–2005)

- Pitcher
- Born: November 29, 1911; Granite City, Illinois, U.S.
- Died: January 7, 2005 (aged 93); McAllen, Texas, U.S.
- Batted: Right Threw: Right

MLB debut
- August 3, 1938, for the Chicago White Sox

Last MLB appearance
- August 23, 1939, for the Chicago White Sox

MLB statistics
- Win–loss record: 0–4
- Earned run average: 5.79
- Strikeouts: 19
- Stats at Baseball Reference

Teams
- Chicago White Sox (1938–1939)

Harry Boyles (November 29, 1911 – January 7, 2005) was an American professional baseball pitcher in Major League Baseball who appeared in eleven games for the Chicago White Sox over parts of the 1938–39 seasons.
