= Joe Rogalski =

American baseball player (1912–1951)

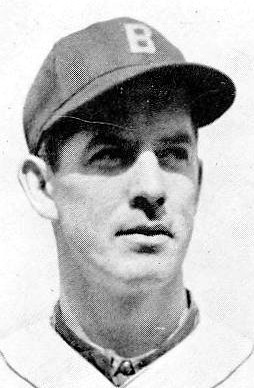
- Rogalski in 1940
- Pitcher
- Born: July 15, 1912; Ashland, Wisconsin, US
- Died: November 20, 1951 (aged 39); Ashland, Wisconsin, US
- Batted: Right Threw: Right

MLB debut
- September 14, 1938, for the Detroit Tigers

Last MLB appearance
- September 23, 1938, for the Detroit Tigers

MLB statistics
- Win–loss record: 0–0
- Earned run average: 2.57
- Strikeouts: 2
- Stats at Baseball Reference

Teams
- Detroit Tigers (1938)

Joseph Anthony Rogalski (July 15, 1912 – November 20, 1951), was a Major League Baseball (MLB) pitcher who made two relief appearances in 1938 with the Detroit Tigers. He batted and threw right-handed. Rogalski was born and died in Ashland, Wisconsin, after a long illness.
