= 1938 Cleveland Indians season =

1938 Cleveland Indians
- League: American League
- Ballpark: League Park; Cleveland Municipal Stadium
- City: Cleveland, Ohio
- Owners: Alva Bradley
- General managers: Cy Slapnicka
- Managers: Ossie Vitt
- Radio: WCLE (Jack Graney, Pinky Hunter)

The 1938 Cleveland Indians season was a season in American baseball. The team finished third in the American League with a record of 86–66, 13 games behind the New York Yankees.

== Regular season ==
=== Season standings ===
American League
Team	W	L	Pct.	GB	Home	Road
New York Yankees	99	53	.651	—	55‍–‍22	44‍–‍31
Boston Red Sox	88	61	.591	9½	52‍–‍23	36‍–‍38
Cleveland Indians	86	66	.566	13	46‍–‍30	40‍–‍36
Detroit Tigers	84	70	.545	16	48‍–‍31	36‍–‍39
Washington Senators	75	76	.497	23½	44‍–‍33	31‍–‍43
Chicago White Sox	65	83	.439	32	33‍–‍39	32‍–‍44
St. Louis Browns	55	97	.362	44	31‍–‍43	24‍–‍54
Philadelphia Athletics	53	99	.349	46	28‍–‍47	25‍–‍52

=== Record vs. opponents ===
1938 American League record Sources:
Team	BOS	CWS	CLE	DET	NYY	PHA	SLB	WSH
Boston	—	12–6	12–10	10–12	11–11–1	14–8	17–5	12–9
Chicago	6–12	—	9–13	7–15	8–14	12–10	13–8–1	10–11
Cleveland	10–12	13–9	—	12–10	8–13	18–4	13–9–1	12–9
Detroit	12–10	15–7	10–12	—	8–14	14–8	12–10–1	13–9
New York	11–11–1	14–8	13–8	14–8	—	16–5–2	15–7–1	16–6–1
Philadelphia	8–14	10–12	4–18	8–14	5–16–2	—	12–9	6–16
St. Louis	5–17	8–13–1	9–13–1	10–12–1	7–15–1	9–12	—	7–15
Washington	9–12	11–10	9–12	9–13	6–16–1	16–6	15–7	—

=== Roster ===
1938 Cleveland Indians
Roster
Pitchers: 15 Johnny Allen; 14 Bob Feller; 16 Denny Galehouse; 18 Mel Harder; 17 Joe Heving; 12 Willis Hudlin; 21 Johnny Humphries; 19 Ken Jungels; 20 Al Milnar; 30 Clay Smith; -- Charley Suche; 11 Earl Whitehill; 19 Bill Zuber	Catchers: 10 Hank Helf; 9 Rollie Hemsley; 8 Frankie Pytlak; Infielders: 34 Lou Boudreau; 31 Oscar Grimes; 4 Odell Hale; 32 Tommy Irwin; 25 Ken Keltner; 2 John Kroner; 1 Lyn Lary; 36 Ray Mack; 7 Hal Trosky; 5 Skeeter Webb	Outfielders: 3 Earl Averill; 23 Bruce Campbell; 24 Jeff Heath; 6 Moose Solters; 22 Roy Weatherly; 33 Chuck Workman; Other batters: -- Lloyd Russell	Manager: 26 Ossie Vitt; Coaches: 28 Johnny Bassler; 27 Wally Schang

== Player stats ==
=== Batting ===
==== Starters by position ====
Note: Pos = Position; G = Games played; AB = At bats; H = Hits; Avg. = Batting average; HR = Home runs; RBI = Runs batted in

Pos	Player	G	AB	H	Avg.	HR	RBI
C	Frankie Pytlak	113	364	112	.308	1	43
1B	Hal Trosky	150	554	185	.334	19	110
2B	Odell Hale	130	496	138	.278	8	69
SS	Lyn Lary	141	568	152	.268	3	51
3B	Ken Keltner	149	576	159	.276	26	113
OF	Bruce Campbell	133	511	148	.290	12	72
OF	Earl Averill	134	482	159	.330	14	93
OF	Jeff Heath	126	502	172	.343	21	112

==== Other batters ====
Note: G = Games played; AB = At bats; H = Hits; Avg. = Batting average; HR = Home runs; RBI = Runs batted in

Player	G	AB	H	Avg.	HR	RBI
Roy Weatherly	83	210	55	.262	2	18
Rollie Hemsley	66	203	60	.296	2	28
Moose Solters	67	199	40	.201	2	22
John Kroner	51	117	29	.248	1	17
Skeeter Webb	20	58	16	.276	0	2
Hank Helf	6	13	1	.077	0	1
Oscar Grimes	4	10	2	.200	0	2
Tommy Irwin	3	9	1	.111	0	0
Ray Mack	2	6	2	.333	0	2
Chuck Workman	2	5	2	.400	0	0
Lou Boudreau	1	2	0	.000	0	0
Lloyd Russell	2	0	0	.---	0	0

=== Pitching ===
==== Starting pitchers ====
Note: G = Games pitched; IP = Innings pitched; W = Wins; L = Losses; ERA = Earned run average; SO = Strikeouts

Player	G	IP	W	L	ERA	SO
Bob Feller	39	277.2	17	11	4.08	240
Mel Harder	38	240.0	17	10	3.83	102
Johnny Allen	30	200.0	14	8	4.19	112
Earl Whitehill	26	160.1	9	8	5.56	60
Willis Hudlin	29	127.0	8	8	4.89	27

==== Other pitchers ====
Note: G = Games pitched; IP = Innings pitched; W = Wins; L = Losses; ERA = Earned run average; SO = Strikeouts

Player	G	IP	W	L	ERA	SO
Clay Smith	4	11.0	0	0	6.55	3
Joe Heving	3	6.0	1	1	9.00	0
Charley Suche	1	1.1	0	0	27.00	1

==== Relief pitchers ====
Note: G = Games pitched; W = Wins; L = Losses; SV = Saves; ERA = Earned run average; SO = Strikeouts

Player	G	W	L	SV	ERA	SO
Johnny Humphries	45	9	8	6	5.23	56
Denny Galehouse	36	7	8	3	4.34	66
Al Milnar	23	3	1	1	5.00	29
Bill Zuber	15	0	3	1	5.02	14
Ken Jungels	9	1	0	0	8.80	7

== Awards and honors ==
All Star Game

Johnny Allen, pitcher

Earl Averill, outfielder (starter)

Bob Feller, pitcher

== Farm system ==
Level	Team	League	Manager
AA	Milwaukee Brewers	American Association	Allen Sothoron
A1	New Orleans Pelicans	Southern Association	Larry Gilbert
B	Spartanburg Spartans	Sally League	Eddie Moore and Chick Galloway
C	Oswego Netherlands	Canadian–American League	Riley Parker
C	Springfield Indians	Middle Atlantic League	Earl Wolgamot
D	Troy Trojans	Alabama–Florida League	Charley Hilcher, Tilden Campbell and Gene Babbitt
D	Gainesville G-Men	Florida State League	Don McShane
D	Hopkinsville Hoppers	KITTY League	Red Smith
D	Owensboro Oilers	KITTY League	Hughie Wise
D	Logan Indians	Mountain State League	Eddie Hock
D	Fargo-Moorhead Twins	Northern League	Jack Knight

LEAGUE CHAMPIONS: Troy, Gainesville
