= Ralph Buxton =

Canadian baseball player (1911–1988)

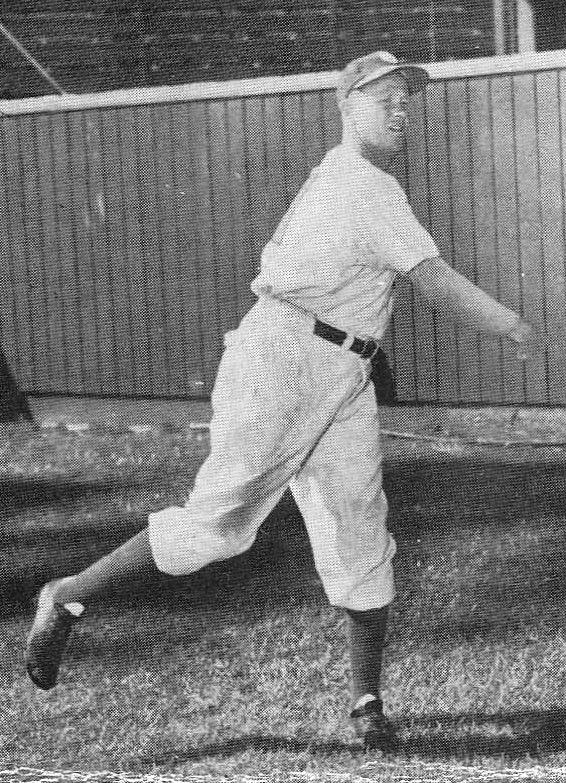
- Buxton in 1947
- Pitcher
- Born: June 7, 1911; Weyburn, Saskatchewan, Canada
- Died: January 6, 1988 (aged 76); San Leandro, California, U.S.
- Batted: Right Threw: Right

MLB debut
- September 11, 1938, for the Philadelphia Athletics

Last MLB appearance
- September 23, 1949, for the New York Yankees

MLB statistics
- Win–loss record: 0–2
- Earned run average: 4.25
- Strikeouts: 23
- Stats at Baseball Reference

Teams
- Philadelphia Athletics (1938); New York Yankees (1949)

Ralph Stanley "Buck" Buxton (June 7, 1911 – January 6, 1988) was a Canadian major league pitcher. He pitched five games for the Philadelphia Athletics in 1938 and 14 games for the New York Yankees in 1949. In between, he pitched for the Oakland Oaks of the Pacific Coast League.

== Early life and career ==
Buxton was born in Weyburn but grew up in Long Beach, California. He attended Long Beach Polytechnic High School. He played a couple of seasons of minor league baseball before making his major league debut in 1938 for the Philadelphia Athletics.

He appeared in 5 games that season. Buxton pitched for the minor league Oakland Oaks, where he was managed by Casey Stengel. He began to anticipate being drafted into the military before the 1943 season, and he missed the 1944 through 1946 seasons due to his military service. He returned to the major leagues in 1949, pitching 14 times for Stengel's New York Yankees.
