= Hank Helf =

American baseball player (1913–1984)

- Catcher
- Born: August 26, 1913; Austin, Texas, U.S.
- Died: October 27, 1984 (aged 71); Austin, Texas, U.S.
- Batted: Right Threw: Right

MLB debut
- May 5, 1938, for the Cleveland Indians

Last MLB appearance
- September 29, 1946, for the St. Louis Browns

MLB statistics
- Batting average: .184
- Home runs: 6
- Runs batted in: 22
- Stats at Baseball Reference

Teams
- Cleveland Indians (1938, 1940); St. Louis Browns (1946)

Henry Hartz Helf (August 26, 1913 – October 27, 1984) was an American professional baseball player. He played as a catcher in Major League Baseball for the Cleveland Indians in 1938 and 1940 and the St. Louis Browns in 1946. From 1944 to 1945, Helf served in the military during World War II.

On August 20, 1938, as part of a publicity stunt by the Come to Cleveland Committee, Helf, along with Indians' catcher, Frankie Pytlak, caught baseballs dropped from Cleveland's 708-foot-tall (216 m) Terminal Tower by Indians' third baseman Ken Keltner. The 708-foot (216 m) drop broke the 555-foot, 30-year-old record set by Washington Senator catcher Gabby Street at the Washington Monument. The baseballs were estimated to have been traveling at 138 miles per hour when caught.
