= George Meyer (baseball) =

American baseball player (1909–1992)

- Second baseman
- Born: August 3, 1909; Chicago, Illinois, U.S.
- Died: January 3, 1992 (aged 82); Hoffman Estates, Illinois, U.S.
- Batted: Right Threw: Right

MLB debut
- September 3, 1938, for the Chicago White Sox

Last MLB appearance
- October 2, 1938, for the Chicago White Sox

MLB statistics
- Batting average: .296
- Home runs: 0
- Runs batted in: 9
- Stats at Baseball Reference

Teams
- Chicago White Sox (1938)

George Francis Meyer (August 3, 1909 – January 3, 1992) was an American professional baseball second baseman who played for the Chicago White Sox of Major League Baseball in 1938.
