= Al Williams (1930s pitcher) =

American baseball player (1914-1969)

- Pitcher
- Born: May 11, 1914; Valhermoso Springs, Alabama
- Died: July 19, 1969 (aged 55); Groves, Texas
- Batted: Right Threw: Right

MLB debut
- April 19, 1937, for the Philadelphia Athletics

Last MLB appearance
- September 4, 1938, for the Philadelphia Athletics

MLB statistics
- Win–loss record: 4-8
- Earned run average: 6.24
- Strikeouts: 52
- Stats at Baseball Reference

Teams
- Philadelphia Athletics (1937–1938)

Almon Edward "Al" Williams (May 11, 1914 – July 19, 1969) was a Major League Baseball pitcher who played in 1937 and 1938 with the Philadelphia Athletics. He batted and threw right-handed.
