= Sig Gryska =

American baseball player

- Shortstop
- Born: November 4, 1914; Chicago, Illinois, U.S.
- Died: August 27, 1994 (aged 79); Hines, Illinois, U.S.
- Batted: Right Threw: Right

MLB debut
- September 28, 1938, for the St. Louis Browns

Last MLB appearance
- October 1, 1939, for the St. Louis Browns

MLB statistics
- Batting average: .329
- Home runs: 0
- Runs batted in: 12
- Stats at Baseball Reference

Teams
- St. Louis Browns (1938–1939)

Sigmund Stanley Gryska (November 4, 1914 – August 27, 1994) was an American Major League Baseball shortstop who played with the St. Louis Browns in 1938 and 1939.
