= Johnny Gerlach =

American baseball player (1917–1999)

- Shortstop
- Born: May 11, 1917; Shullsburg, Wisconsin, U.S.
- Died: August 28, 1999 (aged 82); Madison, Wisconsin, U.S.
- Batted: Right Threw: Right

MLB debut
- September 3, 1938, for the Chicago White Sox

Last MLB appearance
- September 21, 1939, for the Chicago White Sox

MLB statistics
- Batting average: .333
- Home runs: 0
- Runs batted in: 1
- Stats at Baseball Reference

Teams
- Chicago White Sox (1938–1939)

John Glenn Gerlach (May 11, 1917 – August 28, 1999) was an American professional baseball shortstop in Major League Baseball. He played for the Chicago White Sox.
