= Lee Rogers (baseball) =

American baseball player (1913–1995)

- Pitcher
- Born: October 8, 1913; Tuscaloosa, Alabama, U.S.
- Died: November 23, 1995 (aged 82); Little Rock, Arkansas, U.S.
- Batted: Right Threw: Left

MLB debut
- April 27, 1938, for the Boston Red Sox

Last MLB appearance
- September 29, 1938, for the Brooklyn Dodgers

MLB statistics
- Win–loss record: 1–3
- Earned run average: 6.14
- Strikeouts: 18
- Stats at Baseball Reference

Teams
- Boston Red Sox (1938); Brooklyn Dodgers (1938)

Lee Otis Rogers (October 8, 1913 – November 23, 1995), nicknamed "Buck", was an American professional pitcher in Major League Baseball who played for the Boston Red Sox and Brooklyn Dodgers during the 1938 season.

Despite a successful collegiate baseball career at the University of Alabama, Rogers' MLB experience was limited to a single season. Following his brief baseball career, he served in the US Navy during World War II.

Born in Tuscaloosa, Alabama, Rodgers died in Little Rock, Arkansas, on November 23, 1995, aged 82.
