= 1938 Washington Senators season =

1938 Washington Senators
- League: American League
- Ballpark: Griffith Stadium
- City: Washington, D.C.
- Record: 75–76 (.497)
- League place: 5th
- Owners: Clark Griffith and William Richardson
- Managers: Bucky Harris
- Radio: WJSV (Arch McDonald)

The 1938 Washington Senators won 75 games, lost 76, and finished in fifth place in the American League. They were managed by Bucky Harris and played home games at Griffith Stadium.

== Offseason ==
- December 1, 1937: Ed Linke was traded by the Senators to the St. Louis Browns for Elon Hogsett.

== Regular season ==
=== Season standings ===
American League
Team	W	L	Pct.	GB	Home	Road
New York Yankees	99	53	.651	—	55‍–‍22	44‍–‍31
Boston Red Sox	88	61	.591	9½	52‍–‍23	36‍–‍38
Cleveland Indians	86	66	.566	13	46‍–‍30	40‍–‍36
Detroit Tigers	84	70	.545	16	48‍–‍31	36‍–‍39
Washington Senators	75	76	.497	23½	44‍–‍33	31‍–‍43
Chicago White Sox	65	83	.439	32	33‍–‍39	32‍–‍44
St. Louis Browns	55	97	.362	44	31‍–‍43	24‍–‍54
Philadelphia Athletics	53	99	.349	46	28‍–‍47	25‍–‍52

=== Record vs. opponents ===
1938 American League record Sources:
Team	BOS	CWS	CLE	DET	NYY	PHA	SLB	WSH
Boston	—	12–6	12–10	10–12	11–11–1	14–8	17–5	12–9
Chicago	6–12	—	9–13	7–15	8–14	12–10	13–8–1	10–11
Cleveland	10–12	13–9	—	12–10	8–13	18–4	13–9–1	12–9
Detroit	12–10	15–7	10–12	—	8–14	14–8	12–10–1	13–9
New York	11–11–1	14–8	13–8	14–8	—	16–5–2	15–7–1	16–6–1
Philadelphia	8–14	10–12	4–18	8–14	5–16–2	—	12–9	6–16
St. Louis	5–17	8–13–1	9–13–1	10–12–1	7–15–1	9–12	—	7–15
Washington	9–12	11–10	9–12	9–13	6–16–1	16–6	15–7	—

=== Notable transactions ===
- May 4, 1938: Harry Kelley was selected off waivers by the Senators from the Philadelphia Athletics.

=== Roster ===
1938 Washington Senators
Roster
Pitchers: 18 Pete Appleton; 11 Ken Chase; 15 Jimmie DeShong; 10 Wes Ferrell; 14 Elon Hogsett; 22 Harry Kelley; 33 Joe Kohlman; 12 Joe Krakauskas; 16 Dutch Leonard; -- René Monteagudo; 19 Bill Phebus; 17 Monte Weaver	Catchers: 8 Rick Ferrell; 9 Tony Giuliani; 21 Mickey Livingston; Infielders: 27 Ossie Bluege; 3 Zeke Bonura; 2 Buddy Lewis; 1 Buddy Myer; 5 Cecil Travis; 19,22,24 Jimmy Wasdell	Outfielders: 4 Mel Almada; 25 George Case; 20 Goose Goslin; 3 Al Simmons; 6 John Stone; 4 Sam West; 23 Taffy Wright	Manager: 30 Bucky Harris; Coaches: 28 Nick Altrock; 29 Clyde Milan

== Player stats ==
= Indicates team leader

=== Batting ===
==== Starters by position ====
Note: Pos = Position; G = Games played; AB = At bats; H = Hits; Avg. = Batting average; HR = Home runs; RBI = Runs batted in

Pos	Player	G	AB	H	Avg.	HR	RBI
C	Rick Ferrell	135	411	120	.292	1	58
1B	Zeke Bonura	137	540	156	.289	22	114
2B	Buddy Myer	127	437	147	.336	6	71
SS	Cecil Travis	146	567	190	.335	5	67
3B	Buddy Lewis	151	656	194	.296	12	91
OF	Al Simmons	125	470	142	.302	21	95
OF	George Case	107	433	132	.305	2	40
OF	Sam West	92	344	104	.302	5	47

==== Other batters ====
Note: G = Games played; AB = At bats; H = Hits; Avg. = Batting average; HR = Home runs; RBI = Runs batted in

Player	G	AB	H	Avg.	HR	RBI
Taffy Wright	100	263	92	.350	2	36
John Stone	56	213	52	.244	3	28
Mel Almada	47	197	48	.244	1	15
Ossie Bluege	58	184	48	.261	0	21
Jimmy Wasdell	53	140	33	.236	2	16
Tony Giuliani	46	115	25	.217	0	15
Goose Goslin	38	57	9	.158	2	8
Mickey Livingston	2	4	3	.750	0	1

=== Pitching ===
==== Starting pitchers ====
Note: G = Games pitched; IP = Innings pitched; W = Wins; L = Losses; ERA = Earned run average; SO = Strikeouts

Player	G	IP	W	L	ERA	SO
Dutch Leonard	33	223.1	12	15	3.43	68
Wes Ferrell	23	149.0	13	8	5.92	36

==== Other pitchers ====
Note: G = Games pitched; IP = Innings pitched; W = Wins; L = Losses; ERA = Earned run average; SO = Strikeouts

Player	G	IP	W	L	ERA	SO
Pete Appleton	43	164.1	7	9	4.60	62
Ken Chase	32	150.0	9	10	5.58	64
Harry Kelley	38	148.1	9	8	4.49	44
Monte Weaver	31	139.0	7	6	5.24	43
Jimmie DeShong	31	131.1	5	8	6.58	41
Joe Krakauskas	29	121.1	7	5	3.12	104
Elon Hogsett	31	91.0	5	6	6.03	33
René Monteagudo	5	22.0	1	1	5.73	13

==== Relief pitchers ====
Note: G = Games pitched; W = Wins; L = Losses; SV = Saves; ERA = Earned run average; SO = Strikeouts

Player	G	W	L	SV	ERA	SO
Joe Kohlman	7	0	0	0	6.28	5
Bill Phebus	5	0	0	1	11.37	2

== Farm system ==
Level	Team	League	Manager
A1	Chattanooga Lookouts	Southern Association	Wally Millies and Rogers Hornsby
A	Trenton Senators	Eastern League	Spencer Abbott
B	Charlotte Hornets	Piedmont League	Calvin Griffith
B	Greenville Spinners	Sally League	E. A. Donahue
D	Salisbury Indians	Eastern Shore League	Jake Flowers
D	Saint Augustine Saints	Florida State League	Lyle Judy
D	Sanford Lookouts	Florida State League	Guy Lacy and Bill Rodgers
D	Americus Cardinals	Georgia–Florida League	Alex McColl

LEAGUE CHAMPIONS: Charlotte, Salisbury
