= Jim Reninger =

American baseball player (1915-1993)

- Pitcher
- Born: March 7, 1915; Aurora, Illinois, U.S.
- Died: August 23, 1993 (aged 78); North Fort Myers, Florida, U.S.
- Batted: Right Threw: Right

MLB debut
- September 17, 1938, for the Philadelphia Athletics

Last MLB appearance
- August 30, 1939, for the Philadelphia Athletics

MLB statistics
- Win–loss record: 0-4
- Earned run average: 7.38
- Strikeouts: 12
- Stats at Baseball Reference

Teams
- Philadelphia Athletics (1938–1939)

James David Reninger (March 7, 1915 – August 23, 1993) was an American Major League Baseball pitcher who played in 1938 and 1939 with the Philadelphia Athletics. He batted and threw right-handed.
