= Bob Uhl =

American baseball player (1913–1990)

- Pitcher
- Born: September 17, 1913; San Francisco, California, U.S.
- Died: August 21, 1990 (aged 76); Santa Rosa, California, U.S.
- Batted: Both Threw: Left

MLB debut
- May 8, 1938, for the Chicago White Sox

Last MLB appearance
- September 14, 1940, for the Detroit Tigers

MLB statistics
- Earned run average: 0.00
- Games played: 2
- Base on balls: 2
- Stats at Baseball Reference

Teams
- Chicago White Sox (1938); Detroit Tigers (1940)

Robert Ellwood "Lefty" Uhl (September 17, 1913 – August 21, 1990) was an American professional pitcher who played two seasons in Major League Baseball. He pitched in the Chicago White Sox for one game during the 1938 season and one game for the Detroit Tigers during the 1940 season.
