= Woody Davis =

American baseball player (1913–1999)

- Pitcher
- Born: April 25, 1913; Nicholls, Georgia, U.S.
- Died: July 18, 1999 (aged 86); Jesup, Georgia, U.S.
- Batted: Left Threw: Right

MLB debut
- May 2, 1938, for the Detroit Tigers

Last MLB appearance
- May 7, 1938, for the Detroit Tigers

MLB statistics
- Games pitched: 2
- Earned run average: 1.50
- Innings pitched: 6.0
- Stats at Baseball Reference

Teams
- Detroit Tigers (1938)

Woodrow Wilson Davis (April 25, 1913 – July 18, 1999), nicknamed "Babe", was an American Major League Baseball pitcher who played in two games for the Detroit Tigers in 1938.
