= Mickey Cochrane =

American baseball player and manager (1903–1962)

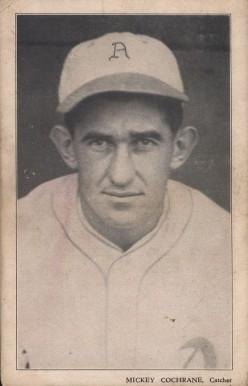
- Cochrane 1929 Becker Brothers baseball card
- Catcher / Manager
- Born: April 6, 1903; Bridgewater, Massachusetts, U.S.
- Died: June 28, 1962 (aged 59); Lake Forest, Illinois, U.S.
- Batted: Left Threw: Right

MLB debut
- April 14, 1925, for the Philadelphia Athletics

Last MLB appearance
- May 25, 1937, for the Detroit Tigers

MLB statistics
- Batting average: .320
- Home runs: 119
- Runs batted in: 830
- Managerial record: 348–250
- Winning %: .582
- Stats at Baseball Reference
- Managerial record at Baseball Reference

Teams
- As player: Philadelphia Athletics (1925–1933); Detroit Tigers (1934–1937); As manager: Detroit Tigers (1934–1938)

Career highlights and awards
- 2× All-Star (1934, 1935); 3× World Series champion (1929, 1930, 1935); 2× AL MVP (1928, 1934); Philadelphia Baseball Wall of Fame; Athletics Hall of Fame

Member of the National

Baseball Hall of Fame
- Induction: 1947
- Vote: 79.5% (sixth ballot)

Gordon Stanley "Mickey" Cochrane (April 6, 1903 – June 28, 1962), nicknamed "Black Mike", was an American professional baseball player, manager and coach. He played in Major League Baseball (MLB) as a catcher for the Philadelphia Athletics and Detroit Tigers. Cochrane was considered one of the best catchers in baseball history and is a member of the Baseball Hall of Fame. In his first season as manager, he led the Tigers to 101 wins, which was the most for a rookie manager for 27 years. Since Cochrane, six other managers have won 100 games as a rookie.

Cochrane was born in Massachusetts and was a multi-sport athlete at Boston University. After college, he chose baseball over basketball and football. He made his major league debut in 1925, having spent only one season in the minor leagues. He was chosen as the American League (AL) Most Valuable Player in 1928 and he appeared in the World Series from 1929 to 1931. Philadelphia won the first two of those World Series, but Cochrane was criticized for giving up stolen bases when his team lost the series in 1931. Cochrane's career batting average (.320) is still an MLB record for a catcher.

Cochrane's career ended abruptly after a near-fatal head injury from a beanball in 1937. After his professional baseball career, he served in the United States Navy in World War II and ran an automobile business. Cochrane died of cancer in 1962. In 1999, The Sporting News ranked him 65th on its list of the 100 Greatest Baseball Players.

== Early life ==
Cochrane was born in Bridgewater, Massachusetts. His father, John Cochrane, had immigrated from Omagh, County Tyrone in what is now Northern Ireland and his mother, Sadie Campbell, had come from Prince Edward Island, Canada, whence her family had immigrated from Scotland. He was also known as "Black Mike" because of his fiery, competitive nature.

Cochrane was educated at Boston University, where he played five sports, excelling at football and basketball. Although Cochrane considered himself a better football player than baseball player, professional football was not as established as Major League Baseball at the time, so he signed with the Portland Beavers of the Pacific Coast League in 1924.

== Playing career ==
=== Philadelphia Athletics ===
After just one season in the minor leagues, Cochrane was promoted to the major leagues, making his debut with the Philadelphia Athletics on April 14, 1925 at the age of 22. He made an immediate impact by becoming Connie Mack's starting catcher in place of Cy Perkins, who was considered one of the best catchers in the major leagues at the time. A left-handed batter, he ran well enough that Mack would occasionally have him bat leadoff. He hit third more often, but whatever his place in the order his primary role was to get on base so that hard-hitting Al Simmons and Jimmie Foxx could drive him in. In May, he tied what was the 20th-century major league record by hitting three home runs in a game. He ended his rookie season with a .331 batting average and a .397 on-base percentage, helping the Athletics to a second-place finish.

By the start of the 1926 season, Cochrane was already considered the best catcher in the major leagues. He won the 1928 American League Most Valuable Player Award, mostly for his leadership and defensive skills, when he led the American League in putouts and hit .293 along with 10 home runs and 58 runs batted in. Cochrane was a catalyst in the Athletics' pennant-winning years of 1929, 1930 and 1931, during which he hit .331, .357 and .349 respectively.

He played in those three World Series, winning the first two, but was sometimes blamed for the loss of the 1931 World Series, when the St. Louis Cardinals, led by Pepper Martin, stole eight bases and the series. However, in his book The Life of a Baseball Hall of Fame Catcher, author Charlie Bevis cites the Philadelphia pitching staff's carelessness in holding runners as a contributing factor. Notwithstanding this, the blame for the 1931 World Series loss dogged Cochrane for the rest of his life.

=== Detroit Tigers ===
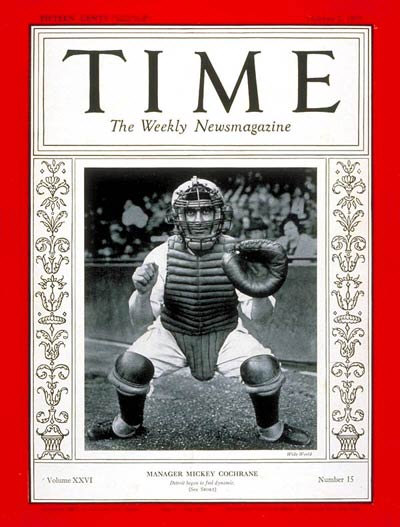
Mickey Cochrane in the cover of Time magazine in 1935

In 1934, Mack started to disassemble his dynasty for financial reasons and put Cochrane on the trade block. He found a willing recipient in the Detroit Tigers. Their owner, Frank Navin, was also suffering from financial troubles. They had not finished higher than third since 1923, and had developed a reputation for being content with mediocrity. Attendance at Navin Field had sagged for some time. Navin had originally hoped to acquire Babe Ruth and name him player-manager, but after those talks fizzled, he turned to the A's. A deal to send Cochrane to Detroit was quickly arranged, and Navin immediately named him player-manager.

With Detroit, Cochrane cemented his reputation as a team leader, and his competitive nature drove the Tigers, who had been picked to finish in fourth or fifth place, to the 1934 American League championship, their first pennant in 25 years. They won 101 games, which was the most by the team for 34 years, and Cochrane was the first ever rookie manager to achieve 100 wins. Cochrane routinely platooned Gee Walker, a right-handed batter, to spell left fielder Goose Goslin and center fielder Jo-Jo White, who were both left-handed batters.

Cochrane's leadership and strategic skills won him the 1934 Most Valuable Player Award, shocking considering that Lou Gehrig had won the Triple Crown, compiled a 10.0 WAR (Wins Above Replacement) rating which was more than double that of Cochrane's and utterly dominated the league in every major offensive category. He followed this by leading the Tigers to another American League pennant in 1935 and earning a victory over the Chicago Cubs in the 1935 World Series; it was Detroit's first undisputed world championship.

In late 1935, the Detroit Free Press speculated Cochrane might eventually succeed Navin as team president. Due in part to his high-strung nature, as well as considerable pressure to join the Black Legion, then-prominent in the Detroit area, he suffered a nervous breakdown during the 1936 season.

On May 25, 1937, Cochrane suddenly had his playing career come to an end. He hit a home run in the third inning off Yankees pitcher Bump Hadley, but on his next plate appearance in the fifth inning, he was hit by a pitch in the head. Hospitalized for seven days, Cochrane nearly died from the injury. This accident generated a call for protective helmets for batters, although tradition won out at that time. Cochrane was forced to retire at the age of 34 after doctors ordered him not to attempt to play baseball again.

Mickey Cochrane was honored alongside the retired numbers of the Detroit Tigers in 2000.

Cochrane compiled a .320 batting average while hitting 119 home runs and 830 runs batted in over a 13-year playing career. He also had 1,652 hits, 1,041 runs scored, 333 doubles, 64 triples, 64 stolen bases and a .478 slugging percentage. His .320 batting average is the highest career mark for catchers. His .419 on-base percentage is among the best in baseball history and is the highest all-time among catchers, aside from Negro Leagues players, such as Josh Gibson. In 1932, he became the first major league catcher to score 100 runs and produce 100 runs batted in during the same season.

He hit for the cycle twice in his career, on July 22, 1932 and August 2, 1933.

In his first 11 years, he never caught fewer than 110 games. He led American League catchers six times in putouts and twice each in double plays assists and fielding percentage.

Cochrane returned to the dugout to continue managing the Tigers but had lost his competitive fire. He managed for the remainder of the 1937 season but was replaced midway through the 1938 season by coach and former catcher Del Baker. His all-time managerial record was 348–250, for a .582 winning percentage.

== Managerial record ==
Team	Year	Regular season					Postseason			
Team	Year	Games	Won	Lost	Win %	Finish	Won	Lost	Win %	Result
DET	1934	154	101	53	.656	1st in AL	3	4	.429	Lost World Series (STL)
DET	1935	151	93	58	.616	1st in AL	4	2	.667	Won World Series (CHC)
DET	1936	53	29	24	.547	2nd in AL	–	–	–	
DET	1936	67	36	31	.537	2nd in AL	–	–	–	
DET	1937	29	16	13	.552	Injured	–	–	–	
DET	1937	46	26	20	.565	Injured	–	–	–	
DET	1938	98	47	51	.480	Fired	–	–	–	
Total		598	348	250	.582		7	6	.538	

== Later life and legacy ==
Despite his head injury, Cochrane served in the United States Navy during World War II. Commissioned as a lieutenant and assigned to Naval Station Great Lakes, he oversaw physical training of new recruits and coached the baseball team. On July 7, 1942, Cochrane managed an All-Service team that played against an American League all-star squad at Cleveland’s Municipal Stadium; the American League team beat the servicemen, 5–0. Later in the war Cochrane, by now a lieutenant commander, was assigned to a similar role in the Pacific Theater.

In 1947, Cochrane became the third catcher enshrined in the Baseball Hall of Fame, after Roger Bresnahan and Buck Ewing. Long after the Athletics left Philadelphia for Kansas City in 1954 without retiring his uniform number 2, the Philadelphia Phillies honored him by electing him to the Philadelphia Baseball Wall of Fame at Veterans Stadium. The Athletics' plaques from that display have since been moved to the Philadelphia Athletics Museum in Hatboro, Pennsylvania.

The Tigers honored him by renaming National Avenue, Cochrane Avenue, located behind the third-base stands of the old Tiger Stadium. Despite making the Hall of Fame, the Tigers did not retire his uniform number No. 3. In 2018, the number was retired for Alan Trammell—22 years after Trammell's retirement.

Cochrane briefly worked in baseball after World War II, notably serving as a coach and then as general manager of the Athletics during the 1950 season, Mack's last year as manager. He also owned an automobile business after his baseball days; he sold it in the mid-1950s. A heavy smoker, Cochrane was only 59 when he died in 1962 in Lake Forest, Illinois of lymphatic cancer.

In his book, The Bill James Historical Baseball Abstract, baseball historian Bill James ranked Cochrane fourth all-time among major league catchers. During MLB’s Centennial celebrations in 1969, he was honored as the greatest catcher of all time by being named to the All-Time Team. In 1999, he was ranked 65th on The Sporting News list of the 100 Greatest Baseball Players, and was a nominee for the Major League Baseball All-Century Team. Yankee Hall of Fame slugger Mickey Mantle was named after him.

In 2013, the Bob Feller Act of Valor Award honored Cochrane as one of 37 Baseball Hall of Fame members for his service in the United States Navy during World War II.

== See also ==
- List of Major League Baseball career runs scored leaders
- List of Major League Baseball players to hit for the cycle
- List of Major League Baseball player-managers
- List of Major League Baseball players with a home run in their final major league at bat

Preceded by Tony Lazzeri; Arky Vaughan	Hitting for the cycle July 22, 1932; August 2, 1933	Succeeded by Pepper Martin; Pinky Higgins
Preceded by n/a	Detroit Tigers General Manager; 1936–1938	Succeeded by Jack Zeller
Preceded by n/a	Philadelphia Athletics General Manager; 1950	Succeeded by Arthur Ehlers
