= Byron Humphrey =

American baseball player (1911–1992)

Bill Humphrey
- Pitcher
- Born: June 17, 1911; Vienna, Missouri, U.S.
- Died: February 13, 1992 (aged 80); Springfield, Missouri, U.S.
- Batted: Right Threw: Right

MLB debut
- April 24, 1938, for the Boston Red Sox

Last MLB appearance
- May 4, 1938, for the Boston Red Sox

MLB statistics
- Win–loss record: 0-0
- Earned run average: 9.00
- Games pitched: 2
- Stats at Baseball Reference

Teams
- Boston Red Sox (1938)

Byron William Humphrey (June 17, 1911 – February 13, 1992) was an American relief pitcher in Major League Baseball who played briefly for the Boston Red Sox during the 1938 season. Listed at 6 ft 0 in (1.83 m), 180 pounds (82 kg), Humphrey batted and threw right-handed. He was born in Vienna, Missouri.

Humphrey posted a 9.00 earned run average in two relief appearances, allowing two runs on five hits and one walk without strikeouts in two innings of work. He did not have a decision.

Humphrey died in Springfield, Missouri, at the age of 80.
