= 1938 New York Yankees season =

Season for the Major League Baseball team the New York Yankees

1938 New York Yankees
- World Series champions American League champions
- League: American League
- Ballpark: Yankee Stadium
- City: New York City
- Record: 99–53 (.651)
- League place: 1st
- Owners: Jacob Ruppert
- General managers: Ed Barrow
- Managers: Joe McCarthy

The 1938 New York Yankees season was their 36th season. The team finished with a record of 99–53, winning their tenth pennant, finishing 9.5 games ahead of the Boston Red Sox. New York was managed by Joe McCarthy. The Yankees played their home games at Yankee Stadium. In the 1938 World Series, they beat the Chicago Cubs in 4 games. This marked the first time any team had won three consecutive World Series.

== Offseason ==
- Prior to 1938 season: Milo Candini was acquired by the Yankees from the El Paso Texans.

== Regular season ==
=== Season standings ===
American League
Team	W	L	Pct.	GB	Home	Road
New York Yankees	99	53	.651	—	55‍–‍22	44‍–‍31
Boston Red Sox	88	61	.591	9½	52‍–‍23	36‍–‍38
Cleveland Indians	86	66	.566	13	46‍–‍30	40‍–‍36
Detroit Tigers	84	70	.545	16	48‍–‍31	36‍–‍39
Washington Senators	75	76	.497	23½	44‍–‍33	31‍–‍43
Chicago White Sox	65	83	.439	32	33‍–‍39	32‍–‍44
St. Louis Browns	55	97	.362	44	31‍–‍43	24‍–‍54
Philadelphia Athletics	53	99	.349	46	28‍–‍47	25‍–‍52

=== Record vs. opponents ===
1938 American League record Sources:
Team	BOS	CWS	CLE	DET	NYY	PHA	SLB	WSH
Boston	—	12–6	12–10	10–12	11–11–1	14–8	17–5	12–9
Chicago	6–12	—	9–13	7–15	8–14	12–10	13–8–1	10–11
Cleveland	10–12	13–9	—	12–10	8–13	18–4	13–9–1	12–9
Detroit	12–10	15–7	10–12	—	8–14	14–8	12–10–1	13–9
New York	11–11–1	14–8	13–8	14–8	—	16–5–2	15–7–1	16–6–1
Philadelphia	8–14	10–12	4–18	8–14	5–16–2	—	12–9	6–16
St. Louis	5–17	8–13–1	9–13–1	10–12–1	7–15–1	9–12	—	7–15
Washington	9–12	11–10	9–12	9–13	6–16–1	16–6	15–7	—

=== Roster ===
1938 New York Yankees
Roster
Pitchers: 24 Ivy Andrews; 22 Joe Beggs; 21 Spud Chandler; 28 Atley Donald; 25 Wes Ferrell; 11 Lefty Gomez; 14 Bump Hadley; 19 Johnny Murphy; 16 Monte Pearson; 15 Red Ruffing; 33 Lee Stine; 32 Steve Sundra; 25 Joe Vance; 20 Kemp Wicker	Catchers: 8 Bill Dickey; 26 Joe Glenn; 18 Arndt Jorgens; Infielders: 1 Frankie Crosetti; 12 Babe Dahlgren; 4 Lou Gehrig; 6 Joe Gordon; 10 Bill Knickerbocker; 2 Red Rolfe	Outfielders: 5 Joe DiMaggio; 17 Tommy Henrich; 9 Myril Hoag; 7 Jake Powell; 3 George Selkirk	Manager: -- Joe McCarthy; Coaches: 30 Earle Combs; 29 Art Fletcher; 31 Johnny Schulte

== Player stats ==
=== Batting ===
==== Starters by position ====
Note: Pos = Position; G = Games played; AB = At bats; H = Hits; Avg. = Batting average; HR = Home runs; RBI = Runs batted in

Pos	Player	G	AB	H	Avg.	HR	RBI
C	Bill Dickey	132	454	142	.313	27	115
1B	Lou Gehrig	157	576	170	.295	29	114
2B	Joe Gordon	127	458	117	.255	25	97
SS	Frankie Crosetti	157	631	166	.263	9	55
3B	Red Rolfe	151	631	196	.311	10	80
OF	George Selkirk	99	335	85	.254	10	62
OF	Tommy Henrich	131	471	127	.270	22	91
OF	Joe DiMaggio	145	599	194	.324	32	140

==== Other batters ====
Note: G = Games played; AB = At bats; H = Hits; Avg. = Batting average; HR = Home runs; RBI = Runs batted in

Player	G	AB	H	Avg.	HR	RBI
Myril Hoag	85	267	74	.277	0	48
Jake Powell	45	164	42	.256	2	20
Bill Knickerbocker	46	128	32	.250	1	21
Joe Glenn	41	123	32	.260	0	25
Babe Dahlgren	27	43	8	.186	0	1
Arndt Jorgens	9	17	4	.235	0	2

=== Pitching ===
==== Starting pitchers ====
Note: G = Games pitched; IP = Innings pitched; W = Wins; L = Losses; ERA = Earned run average; SO = Strikeouts

Player	G	IP	W	L	ERA	SO
Red Ruffing	31	247.1	21	7	3.31	127
Lefty Gomez	32	239.0	18	12	3.35	129
Monte Pearson	28	202.0	16	7	3.97	98
Spud Chandler	23	172.0	14	5	4.03	36
Bump Hadley	29	167.1	9	8	3.60	61
Wes Ferrell	5	30.0	2	2	8.10	7
Atley Donald	2	12.0	0	1	5.25	6

==== Other pitchers ====
Note: G = Games pitched; IP = Innings pitched; W = Wins; L = Losses; ERA = Earned run average; SO = Strikeouts

Player	G	IP	W	L	ERA	SO
Steve Sundra	25	93.2	6	4	4.80	33
Joe Beggs	14	58.1	3	2	5.60	8
Joe Vance	3	11.1	0	0	7.15	2

==== Relief pitchers ====
Note: G = Games pitched; W = Wins; L = Losses; SV = Saves; ERA = Earned run average; SO = Strikeouts

Player	G	W	L	SV	ERA	SO
Johnny Murphy	32	8	2	11	4.24	43
Ivy Andrews	19	1	3	1	3.00	13
Lee Stine	4	0	0	0	1.04	4
Kemp Wicker	1	1	0	0	0.00	0

== 1938 World Series ==
AL New York Yankees (4) vs. NL Chicago Cubs (0)

Game	Score	Date	Location	Attendance
1	Yankees – 3, Cubs – 1	October 5	Wrigley Field	43,642
2	Yankees – 6, Cubs – 3	October 6	Wrigley Field	42,108
3	Cubs – 2, Yankees – 5	October 8	Yankee Stadium	55,236
4	Cubs – 3, Yankees – 8	October 9	Yankee Stadium	59,847

== Farm system ==
Level	Team	League	Manager
AA	Kansas City Blues	American Association	Billy Meyer
AA	Newark Bears	International League	Johnny Neun
A	Binghamton Triplets	Eastern League	Bruno Betzel
B	Norfolk Tars	Piedmont League	Ray White
B	Augusta Tigers	Sally League	Sam Agnew
B	Wenatchee Chiefs	Western International League	Glenn Wright
C	Akron Yankees	Middle Atlantic League	Pip Koehler
C	Joplin Miners	Western Association	Ted Mayer
D	El Paso Texans	Arizona–Texas League	Jimmy Zinn
D	Neosho Yankees	Arkansas–Missouri League	Dennis Burns
D	Bassett Furniture Makers	Bi-State League	Walter Novak
D	Snow Hill Billies	Coastal Plain League	Peahead Walker
D	Norfolk Elks	Nebraska State League	Doc Bennett
D	Butler Yankees	Pennsylvania State Association	Lefty Jenkins

LEAGUE CHAMPIONS: Kansas City, Newark, El Paso, Neosho, Bassett, Norfolk (NSL), Butler
