= Harry Kelley (baseball) =

American baseball player (1906-1958)

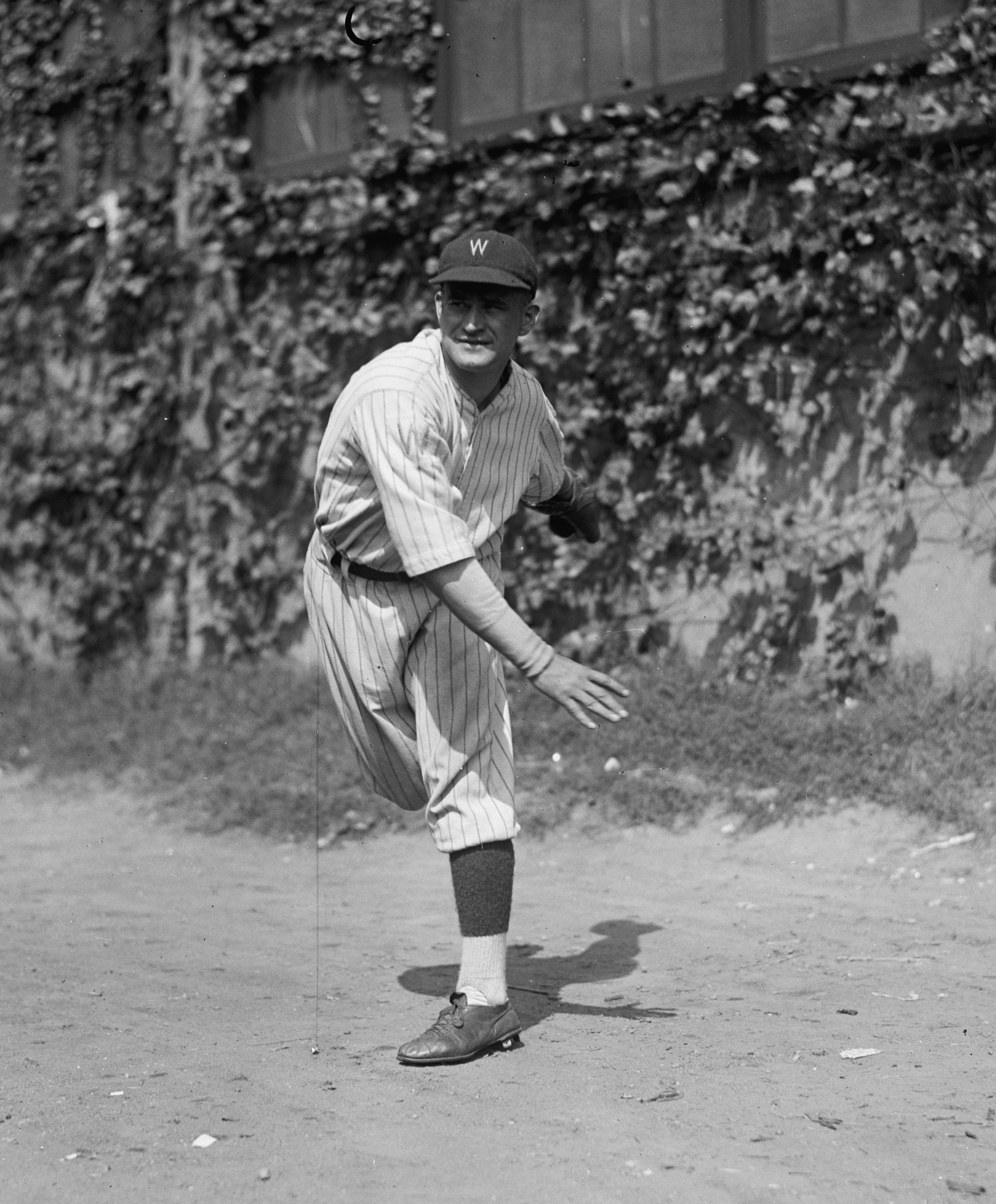
- Pitcher
- Born: February 13, 1906; Parkin, Arkansas, U.S.
- Died: March 23, 1958 (aged 52); Parkin, Arkansas, U.S.
- Batted: Right Threw: Right

MLB debut
- April 16, 1925, for the Washington Senators

Last MLB appearance
- July 23, 1939, for the Washington Senators

MLB statistics
- Win–loss record: 42–47
- Earned run average: 4.86
- Strikeouts: 230
- Stats at Baseball Reference

Teams
- Washington Senators (1925–1926); Philadelphia Athletics (1936–1938); Washington Senators (1938–1939)

Harry Leroy Kelley (February 13, 1906 – March 23, 1958) was an American professional baseball pitcher. He played in Major League Baseball (MLB) from 1925 to 1926 and again from 1936 to 1939 for the Washington Senators and Philadelphia Athletics. In between, he pitched mainly for the Memphis Chicks of the Southern Association.

A native of Parkin, Arkansas, he died of a long illness on March 23, 1958. He had spent time at Baptist Hospital in Memphis, Tennessee followed by 17 weeks of bedrest at home. His funeral was held at the Methodist Church in Parkin on March 25 and his burial was at Cogbill Cemetery in Wynne, Arkansas.
