= Paul Easterling =

American baseball player (1905–1993)

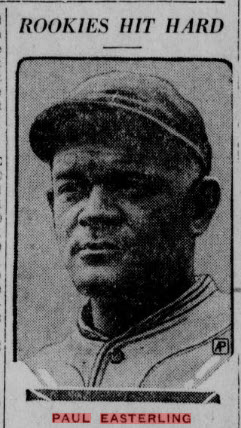
- Outfielder
- Born: September 28, 1905; Reidsville, Georgia, U.S.
- Died: March 15, 1993 (aged 87); Reidsville, Georgia, U.S.
- Batted: Right Threw: Right

MLB debut
- April 11, 1928, for the Detroit Tigers

Last MLB appearance
- May 11, 1938, for the Philadelphia Athletics

MLB statistics
- Batting average: .275
- Home runs: 4
- Runs batted in: 26
- Stats at Baseball Reference

Teams
- Detroit Tigers (1928, 1930); Philadelphia Athletics (1938)

Paul Easterling (September 28, 1905 – March 15, 1993) was a major league outfielder for the Detroit Tigers (1928, 1930) and the Philadelphia Athletics (1938). He batted and threw right-handed. Easterling debuted in 1928 with the Detroit Tigers, playing in 43 games and hitting .325 with seven doubles and four home runs. He took a year off and came back with the Tigers in 1930, this time only playing in 29 games and hitting .203 with 14 Runs batted in. Then, Easterling took seven years off before being signed by the Philadelphia Athletics on September 10, 1937. He played in 4 games for them in 1938, getting 2 hits in his only seven at-bats. Easterling was then traded along with Gene Hasson to the St. Louis Cardinals for Dick Siebert. He would never play again in the major leagues.

Easterling died in his birth town of Reidsville, Georgia in 1993 at the age of 87.
