= George Werley =

American baseball player (1938-2013)

- Pitcher
- Born: September 8, 1938; St. Louis, Missouri, U.S.
- Died: November 21, 2013 (aged 75); St. Louis, Missouri, U.S.
- Batted: Right Threw: Right

MLB debut
- September 29, 1956, for the Baltimore Orioles

Last MLB appearance
- September 29, 1956, for the Baltimore Orioles

MLB statistics
- Earned run average: 9.00
- Record: 0–0
- Strikeouts: 0
- Stats at Baseball Reference

Teams
- Baltimore Orioles (1956)

George William Werley (September 8, 1938 – November 21, 2013) was an American right-handed Major League Baseball pitcher who played in one game for the Baltimore Orioles in 1956 at the age of 18. Prior to playing professionally, he attended St. Louis University.

Werley appeared in his only big league game on September 29, 1956, against the Washington Senators, having been signed by the Orioles just a few weeks prior on September 2. He came into the game in the bottom of the eighth inning, replacing relief pitcher Bill Wight. In quick succession he retired the first two batters, Herb Plews and Ed Fitz Gerald. He then began to struggle, walking the next two batters – Pete Runnels and Roy Sievers – and allowing a single to Jim Lemon, which drove Runnels home from second. The next batter he faced was Hall of Famer Harmon Killebrew – who grounded out.

Though Werley spent only one game in the major leagues, he spent three seasons in the minors, going a combined 24–22 in 88 games. In 1958 with the Dublin Orioles, he went 16–10 with a 4.28 ERA.

Werley died on November 21, 2013, at age 75 in St. Louis, Missouri. He is survived by two children and eight grandchildren.
