= Joe Heving =

American baseball player (1900–1970)

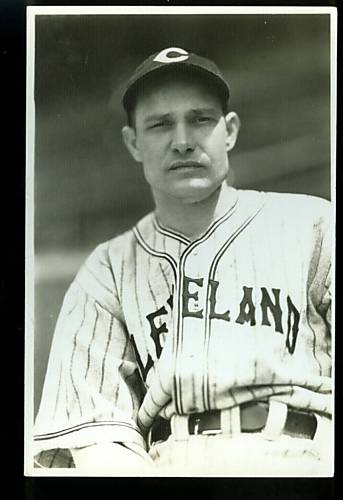
- Pitcher
- Born: September 2, 1900; Covington, Kentucky, U.S.
- Died: April 11, 1970 (aged 69); Covington, Kentucky, U.S.
- Batted: Right Threw: Right

MLB debut
- April 29, 1930, for the New York Giants

Last MLB appearance
- August 5, 1945, for the Boston Braves

MLB statistics
- Win–loss record: 76–48
- Earned run average: 3.90
- Strikeouts: 429
- Saves: 63
- Stats at Baseball Reference

Teams
- New York Giants (1930–1931); Chicago White Sox (1933–1934); Cleveland Indians (1937–1938); Boston Red Sox (1938–1940); Cleveland Indians (1941–1944); Boston Braves (1945)

Joseph William Heving (September 2, 1900 – April 11, 1970) was an American professional baseball player. Heving played as a pitcher for the New York Giants, Chicago White Sox (1933–34), Cleveland Indians (1937–38 and 1941–44), Boston Red Sox (1938–40) and Boston Braves (1945).

In 1944, Heving led all American League pitchers in appearances with 63, despite being the only grandfather playing in the major leagues. Heving was the oldest player in the American League from 1942 to 1944.

Heving was the brother of catcher Johnnie Heving. He was born and died in Covington, Kentucky.

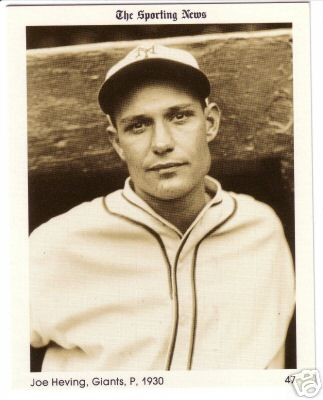

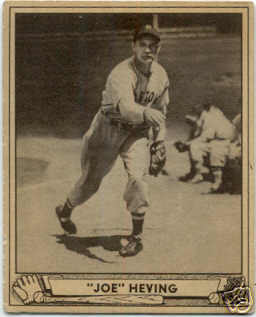

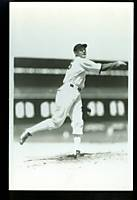
