= Gene Hasson =

American baseball player (1915-2003)

- First baseman
- Born: July 20, 1915; Connellsville, Pennsylvania, U.S.
- Died: July 30, 2003 (aged 88); Pomona, California, U.S.
- Batted: Left Threw: Left

MLB debut
- September 9, 1937, for the Philadelphia Athletics

Last MLB appearance
- May 11, 1938, for the Philadelphia Athletics

MLB statistics
- Batting average: .293
- Home runs: 4
- Runs batted in: 26
- Stats at Baseball Reference

Teams
- Philadelphia Athletics (1937–1938)

Charles Eugene Hasson (July 20, 1915 – July 30, 2003) was an American Major League Baseball first baseman during parts of the 1937 and 1938 seasons for the Philadelphia Athletics.

He is one of 133 Major League ballplayers to hit a home run in their first ever Major League at-bat, as of February 2023.

== See also ==
- Home run in first Major League at-bat
