= 1938 Major League Baseball season =

1938 MLB season
- League: American League (AL); National League (NL)
- Sport: Baseball
- Duration: Regular season: April 18 – October 2, 1938 (AL); April 19 – October 2, 1938 (NL); World Series: October 5–9, 1938
- Games: 154
- Teams: 16 (8 per league)

Regular season
- Season MVP: AL: Jimmie Foxx (BOS); NL: Ernie Lombardi (CIN)
- AL champions: New York Yankees
- AL runners-up: Boston Red Sox
- NL champions: Chicago Cubs
- NL runners-up: Pittsburgh Pirates

World Series
- Champions: New York Yankees
- Runners-up: Chicago Cubs

MLB seasons
- ← 1937 1939 →

Locations of teams for the 1934–1939 American League seasons
American League
Locations of teams for the 1938–1940 National League seasons
National League

The 1938 major league baseball season began on April 18, 1938. The regular season ended on October 2, with the Chicago Cubs and New York Yankees as the regular season champions of the National League and American League, respectively. The postseason began with Game 1 of the 35th World Series on October 5 and ended with Game 4 on October 9. In the second iteration of this World Series matchup, the Yankees swept the Cubs in four games, capturing their seventh championship in franchise history, and their third in a four-World Series run, becoming the first team to win three consecutive World Series.

The sixth All-Star Game was held on July 6 at Crosley Field in Cincinnati, Ohio, home of the Cincinnati Reds. The National League won, 4–1.

== Schedule ==
The 1938 schedule consisted of 154 games for all teams in the American League and National League, each of which had eight teams. Each team was scheduled to play 22 games against the other seven teams of their respective league. This continued the format put in place since the 1904 season (except for 1919) and would be used until 1961 in the American League and 1962 in the National League.

American League Opening Day took place on April 18 with four teams playing, while National League Opening Day took place the following day, featuring all eight teams. This was the first season since 1932 that both leagues opened on different days. The final day of the regular season was on October 2 and featured all sixteen teams, continuing the trend since the previous season. The World Series took place between October 5 and October 9.

== Teams ==
An asterisk (*) denotes the ballpark a team played the minority of their home games at

League	Team	City	Ballpark	Capacity	Manager
American League	Boston Red Sox	Boston, Massachusetts	Fenway Park	33,817	Joe Cronin
American League	Chicago White Sox	Chicago, Illinois	Comiskey Park	50,000	Jimmy Dykes
American League	Cleveland Indians	Cleveland, Ohio	League Park	22,500	Ossie Vitt
American League	Cleveland Indians	Cleveland, Ohio	Cleveland Stadium*	78,811*	Ossie Vitt
American League	Detroit Tigers	Detroit, Michigan	Briggs Stadium	58,000	Mickey Cochrane
American League	Detroit Tigers	Detroit, Michigan	Briggs Stadium	58,000	Del Baker
American League	New York Yankees	New York, New York	Yankee Stadium	71,699	Joe McCarthy
American League	Philadelphia Athletics	Philadelphia, Pennsylvania	Shibe Park	33,000	Connie Mack
American League	St. Louis Browns	St. Louis, Missouri	Sportsman's Park	34,023	Gabby Street
American League	St. Louis Browns	St. Louis, Missouri	Sportsman's Park	34,023	Oscar Melillo
American League	Washington Senators	Washington, D.C.	Griffith Stadium	32,000	Bucky Harris
National League	Boston Bees	Boston, Massachusetts	National League Park	41,700	Casey Stengel
National League	Brooklyn Dodgers	New York, New York	Ebbets Field	35,000	Burleigh Grimes
National League	Chicago Cubs	Chicago, Illinois	Wrigley Field	38,396	Charlie Grimm
National League	Chicago Cubs	Chicago, Illinois	Wrigley Field	38,396	Gabby Hartnett
National League	Cincinnati Reds	Cincinnati, Ohio	Crosley Field	29,401	Bill McKechnie
National League	New York Giants	New York, New York	Polo Grounds	51,856	Bill Terry
National League	Philadelphia Phillies	Philadelphia, Pennsylvania	Baker Bowl*	18,800*	Jimmie Wilson
National League	Philadelphia Phillies	Philadelphia, Pennsylvania	Shibe Park	33,000	Jimmie Wilson
National League	Philadelphia Phillies	Philadelphia, Pennsylvania	Shibe Park	33,000	Hans Lobert
National League	Pittsburgh Pirates	Pittsburgh, Pennsylvania	Forbes Field	40,000	Pie Traynor
National League	St. Louis Cardinals	St. Louis, Missouri	Sportsman's Park	34,023	Frankie Frisch
National League	St. Louis Cardinals	St. Louis, Missouri	Sportsman's Park	34,023	Mike González

== Standings ==
=== American League ===
American League
Team	W	L	Pct.	GB	Home	Road
New York Yankees	99	53	.651	—	55‍–‍22	44‍–‍31
Boston Red Sox	88	61	.591	9½	52‍–‍23	36‍–‍38
Cleveland Indians	86	66	.566	13	46‍–‍30	40‍–‍36
Detroit Tigers	84	70	.545	16	48‍–‍31	36‍–‍39
Washington Senators	75	76	.497	23½	44‍–‍33	31‍–‍43
Chicago White Sox	65	83	.439	32	33‍–‍39	32‍–‍44
St. Louis Browns	55	97	.362	44	31‍–‍43	24‍–‍54
Philadelphia Athletics	53	99	.349	46	28‍–‍47	25‍–‍52

=== National League ===
National League
Team	W	L	Pct.	GB	Home	Road
Chicago Cubs	89	63	.586	—	44‍–‍33	45‍–‍30
Pittsburgh Pirates	86	64	.573	2	44‍–‍33	42‍–‍31
New York Giants	83	67	.553	5	43‍–‍30	40‍–‍37
Cincinnati Reds	82	68	.547	6	43‍–‍34	39‍–‍34
Boston Bees	77	75	.507	12	45‍–‍30	32‍–‍45
St. Louis Cardinals	71	80	.470	17½	36‍–‍41	35‍–‍39
Brooklyn Dodgers	69	80	.463	18½	31‍–‍41	38‍–‍39
Philadelphia Phillies	45	105	.300	43	26‍–‍48	19‍–‍57

=== Tie games ===
16 tie games (8 in AL, 8 in NL), which are not factored into winning percentage or games behind (and were often replayed again) occurred throughout the season.

==== American League ====
- Boston Red Sox, 1
- Chicago White Sox, 1
- Cleveland Indians, 1
- Detroit Tigers, 1
- New York Yankees, 5
- Philadelphia Athletics, 2
- St. Louis Browns, 4
- Washington Senators, 1

==== National League ====
- Boston Bees, 1
- Brooklyn Dodgers, 2
- Chicago Cubs, 2
- Cincinnati Reds, 1
- New York Giants, 2
- Philadelphia Phillies, 1
- Pittsburgh Pirates, 2
- St. Louis Cardinals, 5

== Postseason ==
The postseason began on October 5 and ended on October 9 with the New York Yankees sweeping the Chicago Cubs in the 1938 World Series in four games.

=== Bracket ===
World Series
AL	New York Yankees	4
NL	Chicago Cubs	0

== Managerial changes ==
=== Off-season ===
Team	Former Manager	New Manager
Boston Bees	Bill McKechnie	Casey Stengel
Cincinnati Reds	Bobby Wallace	Bill McKechnie
Cleveland Indians	Steve O'Neill	Ossie Vitt
Detroit Tigers	Cy Perkins	Mickey Cochrane
Philadelphia Athletics	Earle Mack	Connie Mack
St. Louis Browns	Jim Bottomley	Gabby Street

=== In-season ===
Team	Former Manager	New Manager
Chicago Cubs	Charlie Grimm	Gabby Hartnett
Detroit Tigers	Mickey Cochrane	Del Baker
Philadelphia Phillies	Jimmie Wilson	Hans Lobert
St. Louis Browns	Gabby Street	Oscar Melillo
St. Louis Cardinals	Frankie Frisch	Mike González

== League leaders ==
=== American League ===
Hitting leaders
Stat	Player	Total
AVG	Jimmie Foxx (BOS)	.349
OPS	Jimmie Foxx (BOS)	1.166
HR	Hank Greenberg (DET)	58
RBI	Jimmie Foxx (BOS)	175
R	Hank Greenberg (DET)	143
H	Joe Vosmik (BOS)	201
SB	Frankie Crosetti (NYY)	27

Pitching leaders
Stat	Player	Total
W	Red Ruffing (NYY)	21
L	George Caster (PHA)	20
ERA	Lefty Grove (BOS)	3.08
K	Bob Feller (CLE)	240
IP	Bobo Newsom (SLB)	329.2
SV	Johnny Murphy (NYY)	11
WHIP	Dutch Leonard (WSH)	1.227

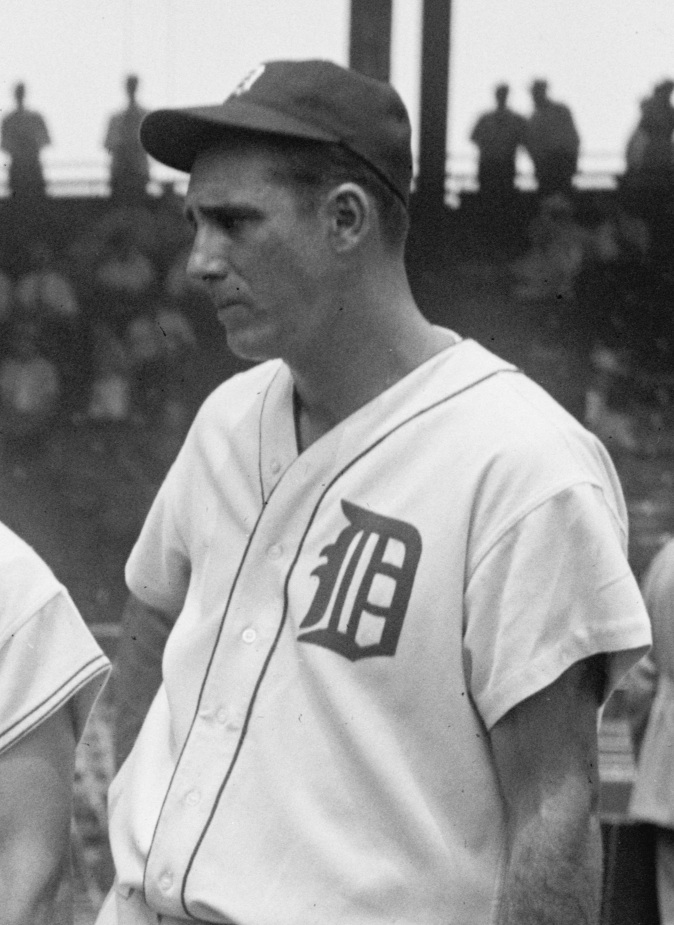
Hank Greenberg, Hall of Famer and 2-time MVP

=== National League ===
Hitting leaders
Stat	Player	Total
AVG	Ernie Lombardi (CIN)	.342
OPS	Johnny Mize (STL)	1.036
HR	Mel Ott (NYG)	36
RBI	Joe Medwick (STL)	122
R	Mel Ott (NYG)	116
H	Frank McCormick (CIN)	237
SB	Stan Hack (CHC)	16

Pitching leaders
Stat	Player	Total
W	Bill Lee (CHC)	22
L	Hugh Mulcahy (PHI)	20
ERA	Bill Lee (CHC)	2.66
K	Clay Bryant (CHC)	135
IP	Paul Derringer (CIN)	307.0
SV	Dick Coffman (NYG)	12
WHIP	Carl Hubbell (NYG)	1.140

== Milestones ==
=== Batters ===
==== Cycles ====
- Odell Hale (CLE):
  - Hale hit for his first cycle and third in franchise history, on July 12 against the Washington Senators.

==== Other batting accomplishments ====
- Jimmie Foxx (BOS):
  - Became the third player in Major League history to hit 400 home runs in the fifth inning against the Cleveland Indians on June 27.

=== Pitchers ===
==== No-hitters ====
- Johnny Vander Meer (CIN):
  - Vander Meer threw his first career no-hitter and sixth no-hitter in franchise history, by defeating the Boston Bees 3–0 on June 11. Vander Meer walked three and struck out four.
  - Vander Meer threw his second career no-hitter and seventh no-hitter in franchise history, by defeating the Brooklyn Dodgers 6–0 on June 15. Vander Meer walked eight and struck out seven. He is the first in major league history to throw two no-hitters in a season, as well as the only player to ever throw no-hitters in back-to-back starts, the latter of which has been described as "the most unbreakable of all baseball records" by LIFE.
- Monte Pearson (NYY):
  - Pearson threw his first career no-hitter and third no-hitter in franchise, by defeating the Cleveland Indians 13–0 on August 27. Pearson walked two and struck out seven.

==== Other pitching accomplishments ====
- Bob Feller (CLE):
  - Set a modern Major League record for most strikeouts in a single game, throwing 18 strikeouts in a 4–1 loss to the Detroit Tigers in game one of a doubleheader on October 2.

== Awards and honors ==
=== Regular season ===
Baseball Writers' Association of America Awards
BBWAA Award	National League	American League
Most Valuable Player	Ernie Lombardi (CIN)	Jimmie Foxx (BSN)

=== Other awards ===
The Sporting News Awards
Award	National League	American League
Most Valuable Player	Ernie Lombardi (CIN)	Jimmie Foxx (BSN)
Player of the Year	Johnny Vander Meer (CIN)	—
Manager of the Year	—	Joe McCarthy (NYY)
Executive of the Year	Warren Giles (CIN)	—

=== Baseball Hall of Fame ===
- Grover Cleveland Alexander
- Alexander Cartwright (pioneer contributor)
- Henry Chadwick (pioneer contributor)

== Home field attendance ==
Team name	Wins	%±	Home attendance	%±	Per game
New York Yankees	99	−2.9%	970,916	−2.7%	12,290
Chicago Cubs	89	−4.3%	951,640	6.3%	12,359
New York Giants	83	−12.6%	799,633	−13.7%	10,954
Detroit Tigers	84	−5.6%	799,557	−25.4%	10,121
Cincinnati Reds	82	46.4%	706,756	71.9%	9,179
Brooklyn Dodgers	69	11.3%	663,087	37.4%	8,961
Cleveland Indians	86	3.6%	652,006	15.4%	8,579
Boston Red Sox	88	10.0%	646,459	15.5%	8,619
Pittsburgh Pirates	86	0.0%	641,033	39.5%	8,218
Washington Senators	75	2.7%	522,694	31.4%	6,701
Philadelphia Athletics	53	−1.9%	385,357	−10.5%	5,070
Boston Bees	77	−2.5%	341,149	−11.5%	4,549
Chicago White Sox	65	−24.4%	338,278	−42.6%	4,634
St. Louis Cardinals	71	−12.3%	291,418	−32.4%	3,598
Philadelphia Phillies	45	−26.2%	166,111	−21.9%	2,215
St. Louis Browns	55	19.6%	130,417	5.9%	1,694

== Venues ==
Over 76 home games, the Cleveland Indians played 58 games at League Park and 18 games at Cleveland Stadium. All Thursday games took place at League Park. This would be the 4th of 12 seasons since 1932 that saw the Indians play at both venues.

The Detroit Tigers' venue, Navin Field, named after former owner Frank Navin, was renamed to Briggs Stadium, named after new owner Walter Briggs Sr., prior to the season's start.

The Philadelphia Phillies would play their last game at the Baker Bowl on June 30 after 28 home games, having played 52 seasons there going back to 1887, and moved into the Philadelphia Athletics' home at Shibe Park, where they would go on to play for 33 seasons through 1970.

== See also ==
- 1938 in baseball (Events, Births, Deaths)
