= East Texas League =

- Classification: Class D (1916, 1923–1926); Class C (1936–1940, 1946, 1949–1950)
- Sport: Minor League Baseball
- First season: 1916
- Folded: 1950
- Replaced by: Lone Star League
- President: Lawrence Jordan (1916); Ike Hockwald (1923); T. Lamar Denman (1924); H.E. Crosby (1925); T.H. Fisher (1926); Harry Wanderling (1931); J. Walter Morris (1936–1937); C.P. Mosley (1938–1940); J. Walter Morris (1946, 1949–1950)
- No. of teams: 10
- Country: United States of America
- Most titles: 3 Tyler Trojans (1924, 1936,–1937); Henderson Oilers (1931, 1939, 1946)
- Related competitions: Big State League

The East Texas League was a Texas–based minor league baseball league that existed between 1916 and 1950. The East Texas League played as a Class D level league in 1916 and from 1923 to 1926. The league became a Class C level league from 1936 to 1940, 1946 and 1949 to 1950. The Tyler Trojans and Henderson Oilers each won three league championships.

== Cities represented ==
- Bryan, TX: Bryan Bombers 1949; Bryan Sports 1950
- Crockett, TX: Crockett 1916
- Gladewater, TX: Gladewater Bears 1936, 1949–1950
- Greenville, TX: Greenville Staplers 1923; Greenville Hunters 1924–1926; Greenville Majors 1946
- Henderson, TX: Henderson Oilers 1936–1940, 1946, 1949–1950
- Jacksonville, TX: Jacksonville Tomato Pickers 1916; Jacksonville Jax 1936–1940, 1946
- Kilgore, TX: Kilgore Braves 1936; Kilgore Rangers 1937–1938; Kilgore Boomers 1939–1940; Kilgore Drillers 1949–1950
- Longview, TX: Longview Cannibals 1923–1926; Longview Cannibals 1936–1939; Longview Texans 1940, 1949–1950
- Lufkin, TX: Lufkin Lumbermen 1916; Lufkin Foresters 1946
- Marshall, TX: Marshall Indians 1923–1926; Marshall Orphans 1936; Marshall Tigers 1937–1940; Marshall Browns 1949–1950
- Mount Pleasant, TX: Mount Pleasant Cats 1923–1925
- Nacogdoches, TX: Nacogdoches Cogs 1916
- Palestine, TX: Palestine Athletics 1916; Palestine Pals 1936–1940
- Paris, TX: Paris Grays 1923; Paris North Stars 1924; Paris Bearcats 1925–1926; Paris Red Peppers 1946; Paris Panthers 1949–1950
- Rusk, TX: Rusk Governors 1916
- Sherman, TX: Sherman Twins 1946
- Sulphur Springs, TX: Sulphur Springs Lions 1923; Sulphur Springs Saints 1924; Sulphur Springs Spartans 1925
- Texarkana, TX: Texarkana Twins 1924–1926; Texarkana Liners 1937–1940; Texarkana Bears 1946
- Tyler, TX: Tyler Trojans 1924–1926, 1936–1940, 1946, 1949–1950

== History ==
=== 1916 ===
In 1916, the first East Texas League began play. A Class D level league, it folded on July 19, 1916. The "league champions", by default, were the Palestine Athletics and Lufkin Lumbermen, who both finished atop the league with a .609 winning percentage. The other teams in the league were the Nacogdoches Cogs, Rusk Governors, Jacksonville Tomato Pickers and a team based in Crockett, Texas that did not have a (known) nickname. Crockett, Nacogdoches and Rusk would never field a professional baseball team again. The Athletics dissolved following the season, with the next Palestine team showing up in 1925 as the Palestine Pals in the Texas Association. The Lumbermen dissolved as well, although a team with that name played in the West Dixie League in 1934.

=== 1923–1926 ===
The next incarnation of the league began play in 1923, and ran until 1926. After playing in the Texas–Oklahoma League in 1921 and 1922 as the Paris Snappers, the Paris Grays moved to the East Texas League and finished at the top with a 76–43 record in 1923, with the Longview Cannibals finishing last, with a 41–77 record. Other teams in the league that year were the Greenville Staplers who played in the Texas–Oklahoma League as the Greenville Togs in 1922; the Marshall Indians; the Mt. Pleasant Cats and Sulphur Springs Lions.

The Cannibals, Cats and Indians returned to the league in 1924. The Greenville, Sulphur Springs and Paris-based teams did as well, however they underwent name changes: the Greenville Staplers became the Greenville Hunters, the Sulphur Springs Lions became the Sulphur Springs Saints and the Paris Grays became the Paris North Stars. In its very first season of existence, league newcomer the Tyler Trojans were league champions with an 83–37 record. Another team, the Texarkana Twins, was new to the league as well.

Returning to the league in 1925 were the Tyler Trojans, Greenville Hunters, Longview Cannibals, Texarkana Twins, Marshall Indians and Mt. Pleasant Cats. The Sulphur Springs Saints became the Sulphur Springs Spartans for 1925, and the Paris North Stars became the Paris Bearcats. The Bearcats won the league championship with a 76–46 record. The Spartans disbanded on June 7 of that year, and because of that the Cannibals consolidated with the Mt. Pleasant Cats, playing as the Longview-Mount Pleasant Longcats until July 12, when the team permanently settled in Longview. The records on June 7 were Longview 18-27 and Mt. Pleasant 22-22.

1926 was the final year of the second incarnation of the East Texas League. The Longview Cannibals, Texarkana Twins, Greenville Hunters, Tyler Trojans and Paris Bearcats returned to the league with the names they held the previous year. The Marshall Indians became the Marshall Snappers-Indians. After finishing first in the league in 1925, the Bearcats finished last in the league in 1926, with a 39–81 record. The Cannibals finished with the best record in the league that year, with a mark of 83–39.

=== 1931 ===
The league was revived in 1931, lasting not even the whole season. The Longview Cannibals and Tyler Trojans returned to the league, and newcomers the Henderson Oilers and Kilgore Gushers joined the league as well. Tyler disbanded on May 5 and the entire league disbanded on May 7, with the default league champions being the Oilers who went 4–1. The Gushers and Trojans both went 1–3, while the Cannibals went 4–3.

=== 1936–1940 ===
In 1936, the league resumed play once again, this time until 1940. For the first time in the league's history, it was a Class C level league, upgrading from a Class D level league. Returning teams were the Tyler Trojans, Longview Cannibals and Henderson Oilers. The Kilgore team was now known as the Kilgore Braves, while the Marshall team, which did not participate in the 1931 incarnation, was known as the Marshall Orphans. Jacksonville and Palestine had representatives in the league for the first time since 1916, with teams known as the Jacksonville Jax and Palestine Pals, respectively. The Gladewater Bears were completely new to the league, coming from the West Dixie League, where they played in 1935. The Bears won the League Championship, as they beat the Trojans four games to two in the finals. The Trojans had placed first in the regular season standings that year, going 94–56, while the Bears went 93–59 to finish second in the league. The Braves finished last in the league, going 45–106. Following the season, the Bears ceased to exist in Gladewater. A new team with that name would show up in 1948, playing in the Lone Star League.

The Tyler Trojans, Jacksonville Jax, Henderson Oilers, Palestine Pals and Longview Cannibals returned to the league for 1937 with their names the same. The Marshall team changed its name to the Marshall Tigers, while Kilgore became the Kilgore Rangers. Texarkana had a representative in the league for the first time since 1926, with a team known as the Texarkana Liners. Despite Tyler leading the league with an 85–52 record in the regular season, they were eliminated in the first round of the playoffs. Jacksonville beat Marshall in the league finals four games to two, to become the league champions. Kilgore finished last in the league with a 42–97 record.

For the first time in East Texas League history, the same exact same teams played in the league two consecutive seasons: 1937 and 1938. Following 1937, there were no league departures, and there were no name changes or new teams for the 1938 season. The Trojans, who had finished in fourth place in the regular season, beat the Oilers, who had finished in third place during the regular season, four games to three in the league finals to win the league championship. Marshall (84–55) and Texarkana (80–60) had finished first and second in the league, respectively, however they were knocked out of the playoffs in the first round. The Jax finished last with a 58–82 record.

No teams would leave the league following 1938, and only one team would change its name for the 1939 season: the Kilgore Rangers became the Kilgore Boomers. Aside from that, every team would stay the same. The Henderson Oilers had the best record in the league, going 85–55, while the Jacksonville Jax went only 51–89. In the league finals, the second-place Boomers beat the first-place Oilers four games to zero. The Jax again finished last in the league, this time with a 51–89 record.

1940 was the final year of the fourth incarnation of the East Texas League. Each team returned from the previous season, and only one team underwent a name change: the Longview Cannibals became the Longview Texans. The third-place Trojans beat the fourth-place Tigers in the league championship. Longview had finished first in the league with a 79–53 record, but were eliminated in the first round of the playoffs. On June 5, both the Palestine Pals and Jacksonville Jax disbanded. The Marshall Tigers moved on to the Cotton States League for the 1941 season. The Texarkana Liners changed their name back to the Texarkana Twins and moved to the Cotton States League as well.

=== 1946 ===
The league made a one-year comeback in 1946, with the Oilers, Trojans and Jax returning. Texarkana came back with a new team name, the Texarkana Bears, as did Greenville (which hadn't had a team in the league since 1926), its team known as the Greenville Majors. Paris, too, returned with a team called the Paris Red Peppers, and Lufkin returned to the league for the first time since 1916, with a team known as the Lufkin Foresters. Sherman was entirely new to the league, with a team known as the Twins. Henderson finished atop the league with an 83–56 record, and they won the League Championship as well, defeating Texarkana four games to two. Lufkin finished last in the league with a 47–92 record. The league disbanded following the 1946 season. The Oilers, Jax, Foresters and Trojans moved on to the Lone Star League, while the Bears, Majors, Red Peppers and Twins moved on to the Big State League. The Twins became known as the Sherman–Denison Twins.

=== 1949–1950 ===
1949 was the beginning of the sixth and final incarnation of the East Texas League. It would last until 1950. The Longview Texans returned to the league after not playing in it during the 1946 incarnation, coming from the Lone Star League. The Gladewater Bears returned as well, after not playing in the league since 1936. They too arrived from the Lone Star League. The Tyler Trojans and Henderson Oilers returned after spending time in the Lone Star League, as well. The Paris team arrived from the Big State League, changing its name from the Paris Rockets (it changed its name to the Rockets for the 1948 Big State League season) to the Paris Panthers. Kilgore returned as the Kilgore Drillers, coming from the Lone Star League. The Marshall team was now known as the Marshall Browns. They arrived from the Lone Star League, where they were known as the Marshall Comets in 1947 and Marshall Tigers in 1948. Bryan, Texas had a representative in the league for the first time, the Bryan Bombers. They arrived from the Lone Star League. So many team arrived from the Lone Star league because that league folded following the 1948 season.

Longview finished first in the league in 1949, with an 89–51 record. Gladewater ended up winning the league championship, however, defeating the fourth–place Kilgore four games to zero. The Bombers finished last in the league, with a 48–91 record.

Every team that played in the league in 1949 returned for 1950, with the Bombers changing their name to the Bryan Sports. The Sports and Paris Panthers disbanded on July 20. Gladewater led the league with a 92–45 record, but second-place Marshall beat fourth–place Longview four games to one in the finals.

The league folded following the 1950 season. The Gladewater Bears, Marshall Browns, Henderson Oilers and Kilgore Drillers folded with it. The Longview Texans did not play in 1950, however Longview was represented by the Longview Cherokees in 1952 and the Longview Pirates in 1953 in the Big State League. The Tyler Trojans became the Tyler East Texans and moved to the Big State League. A team named the Paris Indians represented Paris in Big State League from 1952 to 1953. Paris had minor league teams through 1957. Bryan had minor league teams until 1954, although none in 1951 and 1952.

== Standings & statistics ==
=== 1916 ===
1916 East Texas League

| Team standings | W | L | PCT | GB | Managers |
|---|---|---|---|---|---|
| Palestine Athletics | 14 | 9 | .609 | - | Dick Brewer |
| Lufkin Lumbermen | 14 | 9 | .609 | - | Lee Lemon |
| Nacogdoches Cogs | 10 | 9 | .526 | 2.0 | Tom Cherry |
| Crockett | 9 | 13 | .409 | 4.5 | Bob Countryman |
| Rusk Governors | 7 | 11 | .389 | 4.5 | Jack Ashton |
| Jacksonville Tomato Pickers | 3 | 6 | .333 | NA | Art Wickes |

Jacksonville joined the league June 29 and disbanded July 13; Crockett disbanded July 15.
The league disbanded July 19.

Player statistics
| Player | Team | Stat | Tot | Player | Team | Stat | Tot |
|---|---|---|---|---|---|---|---|
| Lee Lemon | Lufkin | BA | .407 | George Crevenstine | Lufkin | W | 6 |
| J.T. Ellis | Nacogdoches | Runs | 10 | George Crevenstine | Lufkin | Pct | 1.000; 6-0 |
| J.T. Ellis | Nacogdoches | Hits | 13 | | | | |
| Haywood McDaniel | Palestine | Hits | 13 | | | | |
| Hank Utzman | Lufkin | HR | 3 | | | | |

=== 1923 to 1926 ===
1923 East Texas League

| Team standings | W | L | PCT | GB | Managers |
|---|---|---|---|---|---|
| Paris Grays | 76 | 43 | .639 | - | Paul Trammell |
| Greenville Staplers | 70 | 48 | .593 | 5.5 | Bennie Brownlow |
| Marshall Indians | 63 | 55 | .534 | 12.5 | Hick Munsell / Jackie Reid / Jones / Larry Parker |
| Mount Pleasant Cats | 53 | 66 | .445 | 23.0 | Frank Youree / Roy Storey |
| Sulphur Springs Lions | 53 | 67 | .442 | 23.5 | Roy Eichord |
| Longview Cannibals | 41 | 77 | .348 | 34.5 | Jack Lockhart / Grady White / Hick Munsell |

Player statistics
| Player | Team | Stat | Tot | Player | Team | Stat | Tot |
|---|---|---|---|---|---|---|---|
| Fred Craig | Greenville | BA | .328 | Jackie Reid | Marshall | W | 20 |
| Chalmers Williams | Paris | Runs | 105 | Jack Robertson | Greenville | SO | 193 |
| Fred Craig | Greenville | Hits | 156 | Jack Robertson | Greenville | Pct | .731; 19-7 |
| Lillard Belcher | Marshall/Paris | HR | 31 | | | | |

1924 East Texas League
schedule

| Team standings | W | L | PCT | GB | Managers |
|---|---|---|---|---|---|
| Tyler Trojans | 83 | 37 | .692 | - | Pop Kitchens |
| Greenville Hunters | 71 | 50 | .587 | 12.5 | Bennie Brownlow |
| Texarkana Twins | 63 | 56 | .529 | 19.5 | Hub Northen / Wesley Bradshaw |
| Longview Cannibals | 56 | 63 | .471 | 26.5 | Les Tullos / Jack Johnston |
| Mount Pleasant Cats | 56 | 63 | .471 | 26.5 | Paul Trammell / Edgar Behrens |
| Sulphur Springs Saints | 56 | 66 | .459 | 28.0 | Johnny Meanor / Abe Bowman |
| Marshall Indians | 48 | 69 | .410 | 33.5 | Bugs Young / Johnnie Baggan |
| Paris North Stars | 43 | 72 | .374 | 37.5 | Bill Byers / Rollie Zeider |

Player statistics
| Player | Team | Stat | Tot | Player | Team | Stat | Tot |
|---|---|---|---|---|---|---|---|
| Tom Osborne | Mt. Pleasant | BA | .432 | Red Roberts | Greenville | W | 23 |
| George Jackson | Tyler | Runs | 103 | Lloyd Brown | Paris | SO | 224 |
| Tom Osborne | Mt. Pleasant | Hits | 171 | Carl Yowell | Tyler | Pct | .813; 13-3 |
| Pete Daniels | Marshall | HR | 35 | | | | |

1925 East Texas League
schedule

| Team standings | W | L | PCT | GB | Managers |
|---|---|---|---|---|---|
| Paris Bearcats | 76 | 46 | .623 | - | Les Tullos |
| Tyler Trojans | 69 | 55 | .556 | 8.0 | Pop Kitchens |
| Greenville Hunters | 63 | 61 | .508 | 14.0 | Walt Alexander / Lee Ballanfant |
| Longview Cannibals / Longview-Mount Pleasant Longcats | 63 | 61 | .508 | 14.0 | Jack Johnston / Willie Crosby |
| Texarkana Twins | 58 | 64 | .475 | 18.0 | Mike Prendergast/ Paul Trammell / Verdo Elmore |
| Marshall Indians | 51 | 69 | .425 | 24.0 | Johnnie Baggan / Cecil Coombs |
| Mount Pleasant Cats | 22 | 22 | .500 | NA | Bob Countryman |
| Sulphur Springs Spartans | 11 | 35 | .239 | NA | Abe Bowman |

Sulphur Springs disbanded June 7.
Mt. Pleasant and Longview merged June 7, playing as the Longview-Mt. Pleasant Longcats.
Playoff: Paris 2 games, Texarcana 1, one tie, for the first half championship.

Player statistics
| Player | Team | Stat | Tot | Player | Team | Stat | Tot |
|---|---|---|---|---|---|---|---|
| Tom Pyle | Greenville | BA | .388 | Gus Burleson | Paris | W | 19 |
| Jim Holloway | Tyler | Runs | 115 | Kearby Lybrand | Tyler | W | 19 |
| Joe Granade | Texar/Tyler | Hits | 182 | Kearby Lybrand | Tyler | SO | 154 |
| Jim Holloway | Tyler | HR | 41 | Gus Burleson | Paris | Pct | .760; 19-6 |

1926 East Texas League
schedule

| Team standings | W | L | PCT | GB | Managers |
|---|---|---|---|---|---|
| Longview Cannibals | 83 | 39 | .680 | - | Bennie Brownlow |
| Texarkana Twins | 66 | 54 | .550 | 16.0 | Tex Wisterzil |
| Greenville Hunters | 62 | 57 | .521 | 19.5 | George Jackson |
| Tyler Trojans | 57 | 64 | .471 | 25.5 | Pop Kitchens |
| Marshall Indians | 55 | 67 | .451 | 28.0 | Red Snapp / Buster Wisrock / Mike Massey / Dutch Bernsen |
| Paris Bearcats | 39 | 81 | .325 | 43.0 | Les Tullos / Faustin Gallegos / Red Snapp |

Player statistics
| Player | Team | Stat | Tot | Player | Team | Stat | Tot |
|---|---|---|---|---|---|---|---|
| Moose Clabaugh | Tyler | BA | .376 | Abe Bowman | Longview | W | 20 |
| Moose Clabaugh | Tyler | Runs | 106 | Noel Haynes | Paris | SO | 120 |
| Joe Granade | Texarkana | Hits | 180 | Abe Bowman | Longview | Pct | .833; 20-4 |
| Moose Clabaugh | Tyler | HR | 62 | | | | |
| Moose Clabaugh | Tyler | RBI | 164 | | | | |

=== 1931 ===
1931 East Texas League
schedule

| Team standings | W | L | PCT | GB | Managers |
|---|---|---|---|---|---|
| Henderson Oilers | 4 | 1 | .800 | - | Hick Munsell / Bennie Bedford |
| Longview Cannibals | 4 | 3 | .571 | 1.0 | Abe Bowman |
| Kilgore Gushers | 1 | 3 | .250 | 2.5 | Turkey Gross |
| Tyler Trojans | 1 | 3 | .250 | 2.5 | Pop Kitchens |

Tyler disbanded May 5
League disbanded May 7.

Player statistics
| Player | Team | Stat | Tot | Player | Team | Stat | Tot |
|---|---|---|---|---|---|---|---|
| M.B. Hauser | Henderson | BA | .462 | Jackie Reid | Longview | W | 2 |
| Kenneth Westbrook | Westbrook | BA | .462 | Rudy Leopold | Kilgore | SO | 22 |
| Gilbert Humphries | Longview | Runs | 9 | Jackie Reid | Longview | Pct | 1.000; 2-0 |
| Lester Seward | Longview | Hits | 11 | | | | |
| M.B. Hauser | Henderson | HR | 4 | | | | |

=== 1936 to 1940 ===
1936 East Texas League

| Team standings | W | L | PCT | GB | Managers |
|---|---|---|---|---|---|
| Tyler Trojans | 94 | 56 | .627 | - | Wally Dashiell |
| Gladewater Bears | 93 | 59 | .612 | 2.0 | Eddie Hock |
| Longview Cannibals | 86 | 64 | .573 | 8.0 | Tex Jeanes |
| Jacksonville Jax | 80 | 69 | .537 | 13.5 | Ray Flaskamper / Horace Simmons |
| Palestine Pals | 74 | 77 | .490 | 20.5 | Bobby Goff |
| Henderson Oilers | 70 | 80 | .467 | 24.0 | Jimmy Dalrymple / Gus Burleson |
| Marshall Orphans / Marshall Tigers | 59 | 90 | .396 | 34.5 | Harvey Albrecht / Tex Nugent / Bama Jones |
| Kilgore Braves | 45 | 106 | .298 | .49.5 | Lee Cunningham / Dutch Seebold / Jack Fitzpatrick / Robert Rawlins |

Playoffs: Tyler 4 games, Jacksonville 2; Gladewater 4 games, Longview 1.
Finals: Gladewater 4 games, Tyler 2.

Player statistics
| Player | Team | Stat | Tot | Player | Team | Stat | Tot |
|---|---|---|---|---|---|---|---|
| Tex Jeanes | Longview | BA | .362 | Kip Saurbrun | Tyler | W | 23 |
| Charles Baron | Tyler | Runs | 133 | Stidham Talley | Palestine | SO | 203 |
| Walter Paschal | Longview | Hits | 194 | L. Meadows | Jacksonville | ERA | 2.72 |
| Larry Kinzer | Tyler | Hits | 194 | James Gravin | Jacksonville | PCT | .846; 11-2 |
| Larry Kinzer | Tyler | RBI | 121 | | | | |
| Merv Connors | Longview | HR | 24 | | | | |
| Clary Hack | Gladewater | HR | 24 | | | | |

1937 East Texas League
schedule

| Team standings | W | L | PCT | GB | Managers |
|---|---|---|---|---|---|
| Tyler Trojans | 85 | 52 | .620 | - | Wally Dashiell |
| Jacksonville Jax | 85 | 55 | .607 | 1.5 | Tony Robello |
| Marshall Tigers | 76 | 62 | .551 | 9.5 | Bama Jones / Jim Dalrymple |
| Henderson Oilers | 74 | 62 | .544 | 10.5 | Gus Burleson / Guy Curtright |
| Palestine Pals | 75 | 64 | .540 | 11.0 | Abe Miller |
| Longview Cannibals | 70 | 70 | .500 | 16.5 | Harry Faulkner / Wally Paschal |
| Texarkana Liners | 46 | 91 | .336 | 39.0 | Bill Windle / Eddie Hock |
| Kilgore Rangers | 42 | 97 | .302 | 44.0 | Tom Estel / Jimmy Kerr |

Playoffs: Marshall 4 games, Tyler 1; Jacksonville 4 games, Henderson 3.
Finals: Jacksonville 4 games, Marshall 2.

Player statistics
| Player | Team | Stat | Tot | Player | Team | Stat | Tot |
|---|---|---|---|---|---|---|---|
| Jesse Newman | Palestine | BA | .363 | Red Lynn | Jacksonville | W | 32 |
| Walter Bliss | Palestine | Runs | 124 | Walter Shaffer | Henderson | SO | 274 |
| Norman Peterson | Jacksonville | Hits | 207 | Red Lynn | Jacksonville | ERA | 2.65 |
| Tony Robello | Jacksonville | RBI | 130 | Rufus Meadows | Tyler | PCT | .806; 25-6 |
| Tony Robello | Jacksonville | HR | 33 | | | | |

1938 East Texas League
schedule

| Team standings | W | L | PCT | GB | Managers |
|---|---|---|---|---|---|
| Marshall Tigers | 84 | 55 | .604 | - | Guy Sturdy / Willard Coker / Abe Miller |
| Texarkana Liners | 80 | 60 | .571 | 4.5 | Sam Gray |
| Henderson Oilers | 75 | 65 | .536 | 9.5 | Ed Hall |
| Tyler Trojans | 72 | 66 | .522 | 11.5 | Doug Taitt / Fred Browning / Red Rollings |
| Kilgore Rangers | 64 | 74 | .464 | 19.5 | Jimmy Dalrymple |
| Longview Cannibals | 63 | 75 | .457 | 20.5 | Harold Funk |
| Palestine Pals | 60 | 79 | .432 | 24.0 | Abe Miller / Neil Andrews / John Kosey |
| Jacksonville Jax | 58 | 82 | .414 | 26.5 | Tony Robello |

Playoffs: Tyler 4 games, Marshall 1; Henderson 4 games, Texarkana 3.
Finals: Tyler 4 games, Henderson 3.

Player statistics
| Player | Team | Stat | Tot | Player | Team | Stat | Tot |
|---|---|---|---|---|---|---|---|
| Gordon Houston | Texarkana | BA | .384 | Jack Van Orsdol | Marshall | W | 21 |
| Gabby Lusk | Texarkana | Runs | 152 | Eugene Davis | Texarkana | SO | 231 |
| Ed Hall | Henderson | Hits | 196 | Fred Isert | Kilgore | ERA | 2.30 |
| Tony Robello | Jacksonville | RBI | 146 | Vallie Eaves | Texarkana | PCT | .789 15-4 |
| Tony Robello | Jacksonville | HR | 38 | | | | |

1939 East Texas League
schedule

| Team standings | W | L | PCT | GB | Managers |
|---|---|---|---|---|---|
| Henderson Oilers | 85 | 55 | .607 | - | Jake Atz |
| Kilgore Boomers | 80 | 59 | .576 | 4.5 | Jimmy Dalrymple |
| Palestine Pals | 76 | 63 | .547 | 8.5 | Ray Flood / Jack Calvey |
| Marshall Tigers | 72 | 68 | .514 | 13.0 | Cal Cowman / Hub Northen / Gabby Lusk / Guy Sturdy |
| Tyler Trojans | 70 | 69 | .504 | 14.5 | Bobby Goff |
| Texarkana Liners | 64 | 75 | .460 | 20.5 | Eph Lobaugh |
| Longview Cannibals | 59 | 79 | .428 | 25.0 | Jack Fitzpatrick |
| Jacksonville Jax | 51 | 89 | .364 | 34.0 | Jimmy Zinn / Sam Hancock / Lee Stebbins / Hal Grant / Roxy Middleton |

Playoffs: Henderson 4 games, Marshall 3; Kilgore 4 games, Palestine 1.
Finals: Kilgore 4 games, Henderson 0.

Player statistics
| Player | Team | Stat | Tot | Player | Team | Stat | Tot |
|---|---|---|---|---|---|---|---|
| Lou Kahn | Palestine | BA | .346 | Steve Rachunok | Henderson | W | 22 |
| Eddie Knoblauch | Kilgore | Runs | 125 | Bill Roberson | Tyler | SO | 222 |
| Eddie Knoblauch | Kilgore | Hits | 189 | Ed Lopat | Longview | ERA | 2.11 |
| Gilbert Turner | Marshall | RBI | 112 | Frank Perk | Kilgore | PCT | .833 20-4 |
| Gilbert Turner | Marshall | HR | 26 | | | | |

1940 East Texas League
schedule

| Team standings | W | L | PCT | GB | Managers |
|---|---|---|---|---|---|
| Longview Texans | 79 | 53 | .598 | - | Tex Jeanes / Al Costello |
| Henderson Oilers | 79 | 55 | .590 | 1.0 | Jake Atz |
| Tyler Trojans | 79 | 56 | .585 | 1.5 | Bobby Goff / Sam Hancock |
| Marshall Tigers | 67 | 64 | .511 | 11.5 | Salty Parker |
| Kilgore Boomers | 55 | 78 | .414 | 24.5 | Jimmy Dalrymple |
| Texarkana Liners | 47 | 87 | .351 | 33.0 | Abe Miller / Clair Bates |
| Palestine Pals | 25 | 20 | .556 | NA | Elmer Kirchoff |
| Jacksonville Jax | 14 | 32 | .304 | NA | Stormy Davis / Walter Bohl |

Palestine and Jacksonville disbanded June 5.
Playoffs: Marshall 3 games, Henderson 2; Tyler 3 games, Longview 2.
Finals: Tyler 4 games, Marshall 3.

Player statistics
| Player | Team | Stat | Tot | Player | Team | Stat | Tot |
|---|---|---|---|---|---|---|---|
| Salty Parker | Marshall | BA | .349 | Pat Beasley | Longview | W | 20 |
| Billy Binstrub | Tyler | Runs | 120 | Bob Gillespie | Henderson | SO | 224 |
| George Kovach | Palestine/Tyler | Hits | 175 | Pat Beasley | Longview | ERA | 2.33 |
| George Kovach | Palestine/Tyler | RBI | 108 | Jim Steger | Henderson | PCT | .778 14-4 |
| Tom Jordan | Marshall | HR | 19 | | | | |

=== 1946, 1949 to 1950 ===
1946 East Texas League

| Team standings | W | L | PCT | GB | Managers |
|---|---|---|---|---|---|
| Henderson Oilers | 83 | 56 | .597 | - | Ray Honeycutt |
| Texarkana Bears | 81 | 58 | .582 | 2.0 | Gabby Lusk / Joe Kracher |
| Tyler Trojans | 76 | 63 | .547 | 7.0 | Doug Taitt / Dutch Prather |
| Greenville Majors | 71 | 67 | .514 | 11.5 | Sal Gliatto / Alex Hooks |
| Sherman Twins | 70 | 70 | .500 | 13.5 | Guy Sturdy |
| Paris Red Peppers | 68 | 72 | .486 | 15.5 | Homer Peel |
| Jacksonville Jax | 60 | 78 | .435 | 22.5 | Lloyd Rigby |
| Lufkin Foresters | 47 | 92 | .338 | 36.0 | Hank Doty / Mike Mistovich |

Playoffs: Texarkana 4 games, Tyler 1; Henderson 4 games, Greenville 3.
Finals: Henderson 4 games, Texarkana 2.

Player statistics
| Player | Team | Stat | Tot | Player | Team | Stat | Tot |
|---|---|---|---|---|---|---|---|
| Don Stokes | Tyler/Sherman | BA | .361 | Elton Davis | Henderson | W | 26 |
| Gene Olive | Henderson | Runs | 128 | Louis Christy | Tyler/Henderson | SO | 190 |
| Gene Olive | Henderson | Hits | 211 | Elton Davis | Henderson | ERA | 2.31 |
| Paul Martin | Henderson | RBI | 127 | Elton Davis | Henderson | PCT | .813 26-6 |
| Frank Sacka | Paris | HR | 30 | | | | |

1949 East Texas League

| Team standings | W | L | PCT | GB | Attend | Managers |
|---|---|---|---|---|---|---|
| Longview Texans | 89 | 51 | .636 | - | 63,103 | Dixie Parsons |
| Gladewater Bears | 87 | 53 | .621 | 2.0 | 50,328 | Hal Van Pelt |
| Paris Panthers | 75 | 62 | .547 | 12.5 | 66,509 | Jim Walkup |
| Kilgore Drillers | 75 | 65 | .536 | 14.0 | 52,701 | Joe Kracher |
| Marshall Browns | 69 | 68 | .504 | 18.5 | 60,585 | Walter DeFreitas |
| Tyler Trojans | 62 | 78 | .443 | 27.0 | 56,064 | Carl McNabb / Mel Hicks |
| Henderson Oilers | 51 | 88 | .367 | 37.5 | 34,500 | Mel Hicks / George Milstead |
| Bryan Bombers | 48 | 91 | .345 | 40.5 | 40,000 | Felix Penso / Stan Goletz |

Playoffs: Kilgore 4 games, Longview 3; Gladewater 4 games, Paris 3.
Finals: Gladewater 4 games, Kilgore 0.

Player statistics
| Player | Team | Stat | Tot | Player | Team | Stat | Tot |
|---|---|---|---|---|---|---|---|
| Vern Washington | Gladewater | BA | .387 | George Yanen | Paris | W | 22 |
| Al Kubski ] | Longview | Runs | 132 | James Upchurch | Marshall | SO | 210 |
| John Stone | Henderson | Hits | 199 | Rafael Rivas | Gladewater | ERA | 2.09 |
| Joe Burns | Longview | RBI | 136 | | | | |
| Nick Gregory | Kilgore | HR | 23 | | | | |

1950 East Texas League

| Team standings | W | L | PCT | GB | Attend | Managers |
|---|---|---|---|---|---|---|
| Gladewater Bears | 92 | 45 | .672 | - | 27,789 | Dutch Meyer / Hal Van Pelt |
| Marshall Browns | 88 | 46 | .657 | 2.5 | 47,254 | Bruce Ogrodowski |
| Kilgore Drillers | 78 | 59 | .569 | 14.0 | 37,742 | Al Kubski |
| Longview Texans | 67 | 67 | .500 | 23.5 | 41,146 | Dixie Parsons |
| Tyler Trojans | 60 | 78 | .435 | 32.5 | 54,778 | Otto Nitcholas / Stan Goletz / Joe Kracher |
| Henderson Oilers | 60 | 79 | .432 | 33.0 | 23,384 | Burl Storie / John Stone / Bill Sinton |
| Paris Panthers | 30 | 59 | .337 | NA | 30,600 | Jim Walkup / Joe Weeks |
| Bryan Sports | 23 | 65 | .261 | NA | 26,050 | Bones Sanders |

Paris and Bryan disbanded July 20.
Playoffs: Longview 4 games, Gladewater 3; Marshall 4 games, Kilgore 1.
Finals: Marshall 4 games, Longview 1.

Player statistics
| Player | Team | Stat | Tot | Player | Team | Stat | Tot |
|---|---|---|---|---|---|---|---|
| Dutch Meyer | Gladewater | BA | .375 | Darwin Dobbs | Tyler | W | 21 |
| Hal Van Pelt | Gladewater | Runs | 130 | John Fine | Longview | SO | 178 |
| Jack Jones | Longview | Hits | 168 | Howard Waters | Marshall | ERA | 1.87 |
| Jack Jones | Longview | RBI | 128 | Norm Wielansky | Marshall | PCT | .792 19-5 |
| Jack Jones | Longview | HR | 26 | | | | |
| Merv Connors | Kilgore | HR | 26 | | | | |
