= Lone Star League =

- Formerly: East Texas League
- Classification: Class D (1927–1929); Class C (1947–1948); Class A (1977)
- Sport: Minor League Baseball
- First season: 1927
- Folded: 1977
- President: Patrick Newnam (1927–1928); T. H. Fisher (1929); Fred Nicholson (1947–1948); Vernon L. Harrison (1977)
- No. of teams: 21
- Country: United States of America
- Most titles: 2 Tyler Trojans; Kilgore Drillers
- Related competitions: Texas Association; Gulf States League

The Lone Star League was the name of three American minor professional baseball leagues located in the state of Texas during the 20th century. The leagues operated from 1927–1929 (as a Class D circuit), 1947–1948 (Class C) and 1977 (Class A).

== History ==
Each of the three leagues was the result of a reorganization of a previous circuit. The Lone Star League of the 1920s was created by merging two Class D loops, the East Texas League and the Texas Association; it disbanded on May 16, 1929. The eight-member postwar Lone Star circuit of 1947–1948 was formed from a foundation of four teams that had played in the Class C East Texas League of 1946. After the demise of the LSL, the East Texas League was revived for the 1949–1950 seasons.

The 1977 Lone Star League was the successor of the failed Gulf States League of 1976, inheriting Texas-based GSL franchises in Beeville, Corpus Christi, Harlingen and Victoria. Like the GSL, it was an official Class A minor league, not an "independent league," although its six teams were not affiliated with Major League Baseball farm systems. The 1977 Lone Star League played an 80-game regular season schedule from June 10 to the end of August.

The defending Gulf States League champion Corpus Christi Seagulls, managed by future Major League pitching coach Leo Mazzone, dominated the Lone Star League, winning 53 of its 80 games and the South Division title. No championship playoff was held and the league folded after the 1977 campaign.

== Member teams ==
- Beeville, TX: Beeville Blazers 1977
- Bryan, TX: Bryan Bombers 1947–1948
- Corsicana, TX: Corsicana Oilers 1927–1928
- Corpus Christi, TX: Corpus Christi Seagulls 1977
- Gladewater, TX: Gladewater Bears 1948
- Harlingen, TX: Harlingen Suns 1977
- Henderson, TX: Henderson Oilers 1947–1948
- Jacksonville, TX: Jacksonville Jax 1947
- Kilgore, TX: Kilgore Drillers 1947–1948
- Longview, TX: Longview Cannibals 1927; Longview Texans 1947–1948
- Lufkin, TX: Lufkin Foresters 1947–1948
- McAllen, TX: McAllen Dusters 1977
- Marshall, TX: Marshall Indians 1927; Marshall Comets 1947; Marshall Tigers 1948
- Mexia, TX: Mexia Gushers 1927–1928
- Palestine, TX: Palestine Pals 1927–1929
- Paris, TX: Paris Snappers 1927; Paris Colts/Rustlers 1928
- Sherman, TX: Sherman Snappers 1929
- Texas City, TX: Texas City Stars 1977
- Texarkana, TX: Texarkana Twins 1927–1929
- Tyler, TX: Tyler Trojans 1927–1929, 1947–1948
- Victoria, TX: Victoria Rosebuds 1977

== Standings & statistics ==
=== 1927 to 1929 ===
1927 Lone Star League schedule

Team name	W	L	PCT	GB	Managers
Palestine Pals	69	51	.575	–	Rip Ripperton
Texarkana Twins	67	53	.558	2.0	Charlie Miller
Mexia Gushers	68	55	.553	2.5	Les Hayes / Jim Kendrick / Abe Bowman
Tyler Trojans	63	55	.534	5.0	George Jackson
Paris Snappers	54	67	.446	15.5	Red Snapp / T. H. Fisher
Corsicana Oilers	48	72	.400	21.0	Les Nunamaker / Bennie Brownlow
Marshall Indians	12	17	.414	NA	Abe Bowman
Longview Cannibals	9	20	.310	NA	Bennie Brownlow

Longview withdrew May 21. Marshall folded to even the number of teams. Both teams were disbanded May 22.
Finals: Tyler 4 games, Mexia 2.

Player Statistics
Player	Team	Stat	Tot	Player	Team	Stat	Tot
Carl Reynolds	Palestine	BA	.376	Gene McClung	Corsic/Mex	W	21
Buster Wisrock	Marsh/Tyl	Runs	87	Gene McClung	Corsicana/Mexia	W	21
Carl Reynolds	Palestine	Hits	180	E. H. McBride	Long/Cors	SO	139
Tom Pyle	Tyler	HR	26	Atlas Carter	Mexia	Pct	.810; 17–4

1928 Lone Star League schedule

Team name	W	L	PCT	GB	Managers
Texarkana Twins	75	47	.615	–	Charlie Miller
Palestine Pals	72	51	.585	3.5	Walt Alexander
Tyler Trojans	67	53	.558	7.0	George Jackson
Mexia Gushers	55	66	.455	19.5	Roy Leslie
Corsicana Oilers	55	68	.447	20.5	Ray Falk
Paris Colts/Rustlers	42	81	.341	33.5	Abe Bowman / Connally Ludwick / Turkey Gross

Finals: Palestine 4 games, Texarkana 1.

Player Statistics
Player	Team	Stat	Tot	Player	Team	Stat	Tot
Charlie Dorman	Tyler	BA	.408	Ed Hopkins	Texarkana	W	19
Charlie Dorman	Tyler	Runs	122	Ed Hopkins	Texarkana	SO	134
Charlie Dorman	Tyler	Hits	188	Phil Gallivan	Texarkana	Pct	.750; 15–5
Charlie Dorman	Tyler	HR	39				

1927 Lone Star League schedule

Team name	W	L	GB	Pct.	Manager
Tyler Trojans	12	8	.600	–	Roy Leslie
Palestine Pals	12	8	.600	–	Dillard Payne
Sherman Snappers	9	9	.500	2.0	Red Snapp
Texarkana Twins	6	14	.300	6.0	Ray Corgan

Texarkana disbanded May 16. The league disbanded on the same date.

Player Statistics
Player	Team	Stat	Tot	Player	Team	Stat	Tot
Clyde Pratt	Sherman	BA	.442	Leon Pettit	Tyler	W	5
Embert Mueller	Tyler	Runs	25	Leon Pettit	Tyler	SO	40
Clyde Pratt	Sherman	Hits	34	Leon Pettit	Tyler	Pct	1.000; 5–0
Ed Kallina	Sherman	HR	6				
John King	Tyler	HR	6				

=== 1947 to 1948, 1977 ===
1947 Lone Star League schedule

Team name	W	L	PCT	GB	Attend	Managers
Kilgore Drillers	78	60	.565	–	71,685	Joe Kracher
Longview Texans	78	61	.561	0.5	73,134	Jesse Landrum
Marshall Comets	76	63	.547	2.5	51,494	Jerry Feille /Paul Kardow
Tyler Trojans	76	64	.543	3.0	64,810	Hack Miller
Jacksonville Jax	73	67	.521	6.0	37,817	Watty Watkins
Lufkin Foresters	72	68	.514	7.0	42,692	Dixie Parsons
Henderson Oilers	65	72	.474	12.5	50,000	Ray Honeycutt
Bryan Bombers	38	101	.273	40.5	36,817	Mike Mistovich / Harry Logan / Joe Moore

Playoffs: Kilgore 4 games, Tyler 0;Marshall 4 games, Longview 1.
Finals: Kilgore 4 games, Marshall 2.

Player Statistics
Player	Team	Stat	Tot	Player	Team	Stat	Tot
John Stone	Henderson	BA	.396	Jake Henson	Jacksonville	W	21
Lew Morton	Henderson	Runs	145	Robert Ross	Kilgore	W	21
Bob Marquis	Lufkin	Runs	145	Okie Flowers	Longview	SO	218
John Stone	Henderson	Hits	224	Frank Martin	Longview	ERA	2.55
John Stone	Henderson	RBI	185	Robert Ross	Kilgore	PCT	.750 21–7
John Stone	Henderson	HR	32				

1948 Lone Star League schedule

Team name	W	L	PCT	GB	Attend	Managers
Kilgore Drillers	94	44	.681	–	67,255	Joe Kracher
Longview Texans	89	50	.640	5.5	65,033	Dixie Parsons
Tyler Trojans	77	63	.550	18	67,101	Hack Miller
Henderson Oilers	69	70	.496	25.5	48,116	Guy Sturdy / John Stone / Roland Miller / Mel Hicks
Bryan Bombers	66	74	.471	2.09	43,513	Jesse Landrum
Gladewater Bears	59	81	.421	36.0	48,056	Jim Dalrymple / Arthur Nelson
Marshall Tigers	55	83	.399	39.0	38,940	Harry Davis / Red Jones
Lufkin Foresters	48	92	.343	47.0	46,037	Red Jones / Stan Bartkowski / Fred Millican

Playoffs: Kilgore 4 games, Henderson 3; Longview 4 games, Tyler 3.
Finals: Kilgore 4 games, Longview 0.

Player Statistics
Player	Team	Stat	Tot	Player	Team	Stat	Tot
Joe Kracher	Kilgore	BA	.433	Ralph Pate	Longview	W	23
Al Kubski	Longview	Runs	140	Willis Chamness	Kilgore	SO	162
Allen Cross	Kilgore	Hits	193	Otho Nitcholas	Tyler	ERA	1.97
John Stone	Henderson	RBI	146	Ralph Pate	Longview	PCT	.885 23–3
John Stone	Henderson	HR	23				

1977 Lone Star League

North standings	W	L	PCT	GB	Attend	Managers
Victoria Rosebuds	38	42	.475	–	14,198	Tom Zimmer
Beeville Blazers	37	43	.463	1.0	7,150	Bill Bryk
Texas City Stars	35	41	.461	1.0	12,305	Al Gallagher

South standings	W	L	PCT	GB	ATTEND	Managers
Corpus Christi Seagulls	53	27	.663	–	93,137	Leo Mazzone
Harlingen Suns	40	38	.513	12.0	68,203	Paul Thomas / Mike Krizmanich
McAllen Dusters	33	45	.423	19.0	35,752	Shannon Kelly / Jack Allen

Playoffs: None. Corpus Christi refused to play. Victoria and Texas City cancelled their series for a North Division championship.

Player Statistics
Player	Team	Stat	Tot	Player	Team	Stat	Tot
Ken Jones	Beeville	BA	.393	Nick Baltz	Beeville	W	12
Mike Manderino	Beeville	Runs	76	Armando Reyes	Corpus Christi	SO	101
Lloyd Thompson	Corpus Christi	Hits	109	Armando Reyes	Corpus Christi	ERA	2.59
Charles Diering	Victoria	Hits	109	Jim Rainey	Corpus Christi	RBI	67
Mark Sinovich	Corpus Christi	HR	16				
