= Tyler Governors =

- 1933–1934; Tyler, Texas

Minor league affiliations
- Class: Class C (1933–1934)
- League: Dixie League (1933); West Dixie League (1934)

Major league affiliations
- Team: None

Minor league titles
- League titles (0): None

Team data
- Name: Tyler Governors (1933–1934)
- Ballpark: Trojan Park Athletic Field (1933); East Texas Fair Association Fair Grounds (1934)

The Tyler Governors were a minor league baseball team based in Tyler, Texas. In 1933 and 1934, the Governors played as members of the Class C level Dixie League and West Dixie League. The Governors hosted home games at the Trojan Park Athletic Field in 1933 and the East Texas Fair Association Fair Grounds in 1934. The Tyler Trojans preceded and succeeded the Governors in minor league play.

== History ==
The Governors were preceded by the Tyler Trojans, who last played in the 1931 season as members of the East Texas League.

In 1933, the Tyler "Governors" became charter members of the eight–team, Class C level Dixie League. The Baton Rouge Solons, El Dorado Lions, Henderson Oilers , Jackson Senators, Longview Cannibals, Shreveport Sports and Waco Cubs teams joined the Governors in beginning league play on April 27, 1933.

The Tyler Governors ended the 1933 Dixie League season with a record of 59–65, placing fifth. Wray Query managed the Governors, who did not qualify for the playoff won by Baton Rouge. Tyler finished 18.0 games behind first place Baton Rouge in the final regular season standings. Tyler pitcher George Mills led the league with 143 strikeouts.

In 1934, the six–team, Class C level West Dixie League was created when the Dixie League divided into the East Dixie League and West Dixie League. The Governors were joined by the Henderson Oilers, Jacksonville Jax, Longview Cannibals, Palestine Pals and Paris Pirates in beginning West Dixie League play on April 26, 1934.

The Tyler Governors of the West Dixie League ended the 1934 season with a record of 63–62, placing fourth in the final standings. Wray Query again managed the Governors, hitting .365 in 104 at–bats, while serving as the backup catcher at age 40. The Governors finished 20.0 games behind first place Jacksonville in the final West Dixie League standings, as no playoffs were held. Fern Bell of Tyler won the league batting title, hitting .373, while teammate Grady Bassett struck out 178 to lead the league pitchers.

In 1935, the "Governors" again became the Tyler "Trojans," continuing play in the West Dixie League. The Trojans captured the 1935 West Dixie League pennant.

== The ballparks ==
The Tyler Governors hosted minor league home games at the Trojan Park Athletic Field in 1933. The ballpark was located on North Poplar Avenue between East Line Street & East Locust Street.

In 1934, Temple began playing home games at the East Texas Fair Association Fair Grounds. Today, Tyler still hosts the East Texas State Fair at the fairgrounds, located at 2112 West Front Street.

== Timeline ==
| Year(s) | # Yrs. | Team | Level | League | Ballpark |
|---|---|---|---|---|---|
| 1933 | 1 | Tyler Governors | Class C | Dixie League | Trojan Park Athletic Field |
| 1934 | 1 | Tyler Governors | Class C | West Dixie League | East Texas Fair Association Fairgrounds |

== Year–by–year records ==
| Year | Record | Finish | Manager | Notes |
|---|---|---|---|---|
| 1933 | 59–56 | 5th | Wray Query | Did not qualify |
| 1934 | 63–62 | 4th | Wray Query | No playoffs held |

== Notable alumni ==
- Fern Bell (1934)
- Kerby Farrell (1934)
- Alex Mustaikis (1933)
- Oscar Tuero (1934)

== See also ==
Tyler Governors players
