= Longview Texans =

The Longview Texans minor league baseball team played in the East Texas League (1940, 1949–1950) and the Lone Star League (1947–1948). The team, which was based in the American city of Longview, Texas, was affiliated with the Chicago White Sox and St. Louis Cardinals in 1940 and the New York Yankees in 1948.

== Notable alumni ==
- Jimmy Adair
- Heinz Becker
- Merv Connors
- Tex Jeanes
- Paul Kardow
- Jesse Landrum
- Ralph McCabe
- Dixie Parsons
- Jackie Sullivan

Adair and Jeanes managed the team in 1940, Landrum managed the team in 1947 and Parsons managed the team from 1948 to 1950.
