= Heinie Schuble =

American baseball player (1906–1990)

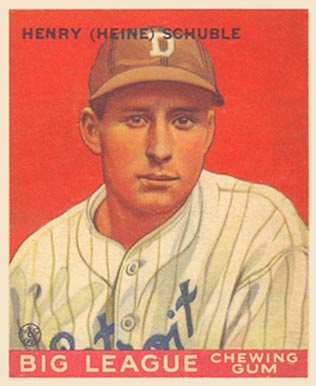
- Heinie Schuble baseball card, 1933
- Shortstop / Third baseman
- Born: November 1, 1906; Houston, Texas, U.S.
- Died: October 2, 1990 (aged 83); Baytown, Texas, U.S.
- Batted: Right Threw: Right

MLB debut
- July 8, 1927, for the St. Louis Cardinals

Last MLB appearance
- May 15, 1936, for the St. Louis Cardinals

MLB statistics
- Batting average: .251
- Home runs: 11
- Runs batted in: 114
- Stats at Baseball Reference

Teams
- St. Louis Cardinals (1927); Detroit Tigers (1929, 1932–1935); St. Louis Cardinals (1936)

Career highlights and awards
- World Series champion (1935)

Henry George "Heinie" Schuble (November 1, 1906 – October 2, 1990) was an American baseball infielder. He played professional baseball for 11 years from 1926 to 1936, including seven seasons in Major League Baseball with the St. Louis Cardinals (1927 and 1936) and Detroit Tigers (1929–1935). He appeared in 332 major league games (172 at shortstop, 106 at third base) and compiled a .251 batting average and .296 on-base percentage.

== Early years ==
Schuble was born in Houston, Texas, in 1906.

== Professional baseball ==
Schuble began playing professional baseball in 1925 as a second baseman with the Mount Pleasant Cats of the East Texas League. He moved on in 1926 to play as a second baseman in the Texas Association with the Palestine Pals and Temple Surgeons and in the Texas League with the Houston Buffaloes. On July 2, 1926, in his first game for Temple, he hit a home run, a triple, and a single in four at bats.

On September 15, 1926, Schuble was traded by the Houston Buffaloes to the Syracuse Stars. He reported to Syracuse in March 1927, but began the 1927 season with the Danville Veterans of the Three-Eye League before moving up to the St. Louis Cardinals following an injury to St. Louis shortstop Tommy Thevenow. He made his major league debut with the Cardinals on July 8, 1927, and appeared in 65 games, 62 of them as the team's starting shortstop. He compiled a .257 batting average in 218 at bats.

After spending three months with the Cardinals in 1927, Schuble returned to the Houston Buffaloes in the Texas League in 1928, appearing in 157 games with a .285 batting average.

On August 31, 1928, the Buffaloes sold Schuble and pitcher Frank Barnes for $50,000 to the Detroit Tigers, effective at the end of the 1928 season. During the 1929 season, Schuble appeared in 92 games and committed 46 errors in 86 games at shortstop. His .233 batting average and "erratic work in the field" resulted in his being optioned to the Beaumont Exporters (Texas League) in January 1930. His fielding in 1929 was so poor that he was given the nickname "Kid Boots".

During the 1930 season, Schuble appeared in 145 games for Beaumont, principally as a shortstop, compiled a .320 batting average, but committed a career high 55 errors. During one stretch in 1930, he struck out 18 consecutive times.

In February 1931, Schuble spent spring training with the Tigers, competing with Bill Akers for a roster spot as a backup infielder. Harry Bullion in the Detroit Free Press wrote at the time: "If Schuble possessed half the fielding ability that he does genuine nerve, dynamite would be necessary to blow him out of a regular job. Nothing fazes the kid. He can juggle a grounder or throw a ball away and feel no more concern than if he made a perfect stop and play on it." Schuble was sent back to Beaumont for the 1932 season, but he was moved from shortstop to third base, where he committed 43 errors and saw his batting average dip 45 points to .275.

Schuble returned to the Tigers in 1932 and had the best season of his major league career. He appeared in 102 games for the 1932 Tigers, including 72 as the team's starting third baseman and 16 as the starting shortstop. He committed only 19 errors and compiled a career high .271 batting average and a .319 on-base percentage. Schuble was reputed to be the fastest player on the 1932 Tigers and ranked eighth in the American League with 14 stolen bases in 1932.

Schuble remained with the Tigers through the 1935, but was used as a utility infielder and pinch runner after the 1932 season.

Schuble spent most of the 1936 season in the minor leagues with the Houston Buffaloes and Rochester Red Wings. He also appeared in two games for the 1936 St. Louis Cardinals. He did not have an at bat for the Cardinals and played only one inning in the field.

Schuble appeared in 332 major league games, including 172 at shortstop and 106 at third base. In 1,010 plate appearances, he had 235 hits, including 70 extra base hits, and scored 235 runs. He accumulated a .251 career batting average with 11 home runs, 114 runs batted in and a .367 slugging percentage.

== Family and later years ==
Schuble was married on June 5, 1927, to Agnes Shaw in front of 6,000 spectators, in a pre-game ceremony at home plate, while he was a minor league player in Danville, Illinois.

After retiring from baseball, Schuble worked as an electrician at the Humble Oil and Refining Co. plant in Baytown, Texas. He began working at Humble Oil in 1945 and moved to Baytown in 1948.

Schuble died in 1990 at age 83 in Baytown. He was buried at Forest Park Lawndale Cemetery in Houston.
