= West Dixie League =

- Formerly: Dixie League
- Classification: Class C (1934–1935)
- Sport: Minor League Baseball
- First season: 1934
- Folded: 1935
- Replaced by: East Texas League
- President: J. Alvin Gardner (1934); J. Walter Morris (1935)
- No. of teams: 9
- Country: United States of America
- Most titles: 2 Jacksonville Jax (1934–1935)
- Related competitions: East Dixie League

'The West Dixie League was an American professional minor league baseball league that operated for two seasons from 1934 to 1935 as a Class C level league.

== History ==
The West Dixie League was created when the Dixie League divided into the East Dixie League and West Dixie League in 1934. The league included teams from several cities across the region: Louisiana was represented by Baton Rouge and Shreveport; Arkansas by El Dorado; Mississippi by Jackson; and Texas by Henderson, Longview, Tyler, and Waco.

The Jacksonville Jax won both league titles in 1934 and 1935.

In 1936, the West Dixie League effectively became the East Texas League.

== Cities Represented ==
- Gladewater, TX: Gladewater Bears 1935
- Henderson, TX: Henderson Oilers 1934–1935
- Jacksonville, TX: Jacksonville Jax 1934–1935
- Longview, TX: Longview Cannibals 1934–1935
- Lufkin, TX: Lufkin Lumbermen 1934
- Palestine, TX: Palestine Pals 1934–1935
- Paris, TX: Paris Pirates 1934
- Shreveport, LA: Shreveport Sports 1935
- Tyler, TX: Tyler Governors 1934; Tyler Trojans 1935

== Standings & statistics ==
=== 1934 West Dixie League ===
schedule

| Team standings | W | L | PCT | GB | Managers |
|---|---|---|---|---|---|
| Jacksonville Jax | 83 | 42 | .664 | – | Wally Dashiell |
| Henderson Oilers | 67 | 58 | .536 | 16 | Pat Moulton |
| Longview Cannibals | 66 | 59 | .528 | 17 | Ray Flaskamper / Dallas Warren |
| Tyler Governors | 63 | 62 | .504 | 20 | Wray Query |
| Palestine Pals | 53 | 72 | .424 | 30 | Bobby Goff |
| Paris Pirates / Lufkin Lumbermen | 43 | 82 | .344 | 40 | Wayne Windle |

Paris (17–45) moved to Lufkin June 27
No playoffs scheduled.

Player statistics
| Player | Team | Stat | Tot | Player | Team | Stat | Tot |
|---|---|---|---|---|---|---|---|
| Fern Bell | Tyler | BA | .373 | Linville Watkins | Jacksonville | W | 19 |
| Kerby Farrell | Tyler | Runs | 105 | Grady Bassett | Tyler | SO | 178 |
| Tom Pyle | Jacksonville | Hits | 174 | Jackie Reid | Jacksonville | ERA | 1.98 |
| John Cummings | Jacksonville | RBI | 131 | Jackie Reid | Jacksonville | PCT | .857 12–2 |
| Lou Frierson | Paris/Lufkin | HR | 40 | | | | |

=== 1935 West Dixie League ===
schedule

| Team standings | W | L | PCT | GB | Managers |
|---|---|---|---|---|---|
| Tyler Trojans | 76 | 54 | .585 | – | Wally Dashiell |
| Palestine Pals | 76 | 56 | .576 | 1 | Bobby Goff |
| Longview Cannibals | 72 | 60 | .545 | 5 | Tex Jeanes |
| Jacksonville Jax | 66 | 66 | .500 | 11 | Jimmy Sanders / Jack Reid |
| Henderson Oilers | 60 | 70 | .462 | 16 | Ray Flaskamper |
| Shreveport Sports / Gladewater Bears | 44 | 88 | .333 | 33 | Fred Nicholson / Neal Rabe |

Shreveport (8–28) moved to Gladewater June 4.
Playoffs: Jacksonville 3 games, Palestine 2; Tyler 3 games, Longview 2
Finals: Jacksonville 3 games, Tyler 0, one tie.

Player statistics
| Player | Team | Stat | Tot | Player | Team | Stat | Tot |
|---|---|---|---|---|---|---|---|
| Tom Pyle | Tyler | BA | .376 | Grady Bassett | Tyler | W | 23 |
| Charles Baronovic | Tyler | Runs | 98 | Grady Bassett | Tyler | SO | 180 |
| Marshall Mauldin | Longview | Hits | 179 | Hugo Klaerner | Longview | ERA | 1.80 |
| Tom Pyle | Tyler | RBI | 106 | Jack Lamb | Tyler | PCT | .842 16–3 |
| Merv Connors | Palestine | HR | 29 | | | | |
