= Gordon Houston =

American baseball player

- Outfielder / Shortstop
- Born: March 20, 1916; Clarksville, Arkansas
- Died: February 10, 1942 (aged 25); Tacoma, Washington
- Batted: Right Threw: Right

Teams
- Monroe Twins Cotton States League, 1937; Oklahoma City Indians Texas League, 1938; Texarkana Liners East Texas League, 1938–1940

Career highlights and awards
- East Texas League Batting Title (1938); East Texas League All-Star Game (1938); East Texas League Season-End All-Star Team (1938)

Gordon Enloe Houston (March 20, 1916 – February 10, 1942) was an American professional outfielder and shortstop who played from 1937 through 1940 in Minor League Baseball. Listed at 5' 8" (1.77 m), 156 lb. (71 k), he batted and threw right-handed.

Houston is remembered as the first player in Organized Baseball to die during active duty in World War II.

== Early life ==
Born in Clarksville, Arkansas, Houston moved along with his family to Shreveport, Louisiana in the early 1920s, and were in Dallas, Texas in the early 1930s. They eventually settled in San Antonio, Texas, in 1937. Gordon and his brother Charles Jr., commonly called C. L. like their father, showed interest in sports at an early age. Both were stars on the baseball and football teams at Sunset High School in Dallas, and following their graduation in 1934, they enrolled at College of the Ozarks in Clarksville. The brothers attended class during the winter months and played semi-professional baseball with a lumber yard team in the summer. By 1936, the Houstons attended Henderson State Teachers College in Arkadelphia, Arkansas, where they starred on the football team.

== Baseball career ==
After moving to San Antonio, Gordon and C. L. enrolled at local St. Mary's University, and pretty soon they received an invitation to attend a tryout with the Monroe Twins of the Class-C Cotton States League. Both brothers were offered contracts to play with Monroe in the 1937 season. Gordon batted .315 and slugged .417 in 46 games while playing at shortstop; C. L. played at center field and batted .315 in 21 games.

During the off-season, they had heard that the Texarkana Liners of the Class-C East Texas League had appointed Sam Gray as their new manager. Gray, a former Philadelphia Athletics and St. Louis Browns pitcher, would be looking for new players when the team started spring training in 1938. Finally, Gordon was added to the roster, but C. L. did not make the final cut.

Houston had his most productive season with the Liners in 1938, when he led the East Texas League with a .384 average and his .618 slugging percentage was second best in the eight-team circuit. Houston started at left field and later moved to right field, going 3-for-4 on Opening Day and staying above .400 until the midseason, but never hit below .380 throughout the rest of the season. In addition, he collected 32 doubles, seven triples and 18 home runs, driving in 70 runs while stealing 25 bases in 108 games.

Besides, Houston appeared in the midseason East Texas League All-Star Game in which played eleven future major leaguers. Houston went 5-for-5, scored one run and drove in another for the North team. After the game, he was sent to the Class-A Oklahoma City Indians of the Texas League and went 6-for-22 in seven games, helping the Indians swept the Houston Buffaloes in a crucial doubleheader, before returning to Texarkana. At the end of the season, he was selected to the East Texas League Season-End All-Star team.

Houston returned with Texarkana in 1939 and looking forward to achieve another strong season. Unfortunately, he suffered a spike wound to his foot early in the season that kept him out of the lineup for two weeks, which was more detrimental to his performance than he had thought possible. He appeared in just 109 games, batting a paltry .219 average with three homers and 39 RBI.

Houston rebounded in 1940 while playing his third consecutive season with Texarkana, appearing in a career-high 129 games and leading the team in average (.304), hits (158) and doubles (30). It was a solid season for the 24-year-old outfielder but there were no offers available in a year that saw a major escalation in World War II.

== Military service and death ==
In November 1940, the Houston brothers decided to enlist in the peacetime United States Army Air Corp since they both wanted to be pilots. Gordon passed the eye exam, which required 20/20 vision at that time, but C. L. did not. In February 1941, C. L. prepared for basic training in a ground-based role with the Air Corps, while Gordon reported to the Ontario Air National Guard Station in California for primary flight training.

After the attack on Pearl Harbor in December 1941, second lieutenant Houston assumed his position as flight leader with the 55th Pursuit Group stationed at McChord Field in Tacoma, Washington, the headquarters of the GHQ Air Force Northwest Air District. Piloting his Republic P-43 Lancer, a pre-war fighter plane poorly fit for combat, Houston would lead his flight up and down the coast on the lookout for Japanese submarines or aircraft carriers that might be tempted by the concentration of large airplane manufacturing plants in that region.

On February 10, 1942, Houston's flight was landing at McChord Field in Tacoma after an uneventful sortie. As he approached the runway, another plane was coming in directly beneath him. Then, Houston climbed slightly so he could head for the end of the runway and the overrun, a grassy area at the end of the runway that was used in case a plane overshoots a little. What Houston did not realize was that a hitch had been dug during the day to lay some sewer tile. As a result, his plane, which had poor forward visibility when taxiing, hit the ditch and flipped over. Houston died instantly.

Funeral services were held at the Fort Sam Houston Post Chapel in San Antonio, Texas on February 14, 1942, and Gordon Houston was buried in the National Cemetery at Fort Sam Houston with full military honors.

== Batting statistics ==
	Team	League	Class	G	AB	R	H	2B	3B	HR	TB	RBI	AVG	SLG
1937	Monroe	CSTL	C	46	175	19	56	8	3	1	73	20	.320	.417
1938	Texarkana	ETXL	C	108	427	100	164	32	7	18	264	70	.384	.618
1938	Oklahoma City	TL	A1	7	22	0	6	0	0	0	6	0	.272	.272
1939	Texarkana	ETXL	C	109	375	51	82	18	2	3	113	39	.219	.301
1940	Texarkana	ETXL	C	129	519	80	158	30	3	5	209	57	.304	.403
Totals				399	1518	250	466	88	15	27	665	186	.307	.438

Some statistics are incomplete because there are no records available at the time of the request.
