= Edible Field =

Ballpark in Bryan, Texas, US

- Interactive map of Edible Field
- Former names: Travis Field (2018–2022); Nutrabolt Stadium (2016–2018); Cellucor Field (2014–2016); American Momentum Bank Ballpark (2012–2013); Brazos Valley Bank Ballpark (2007–2012); Travis Field/Travis Park (1950–2007); Bomber Field (1947–1949)
- Location: 2200 Bomber Dr. Bryan, TX 77801; 525 W. Carson St. Bryan, TX 77801
- Coordinates: 30.6452°N 96.3696°W
- Capacity: 2,000

Construction
- Groundbreaking: 1946
- Built: 1946-47
- Opened: 24 April 1947
- Renovated: 1956, 2007, 2017

Tenants
- Bryan Bombers (LSL/ETXL) (1947–1949); Bryan Sports (ETXL) (1950); Bryan Majors (BSL) (1953); Bryan Indians (BSL) (1954); Texas A&M Aggies (NCAA) (1959 (playoffs only); 1972–1975, 1978); Brazos Valley Bombers (TCL) (2007–present); Twin City Toucans FC (USL2) (2017–present)

Edible Field is a ballpark located in Bryan, Texas; it is home to the TCL Brazos Valley Bombers and the USL2 Twin City Toucans soccer team. Renamed by a corporate sponsorship with Edible Arrangements in 2021, it was long known as Travis Field during its use by several minor-league baseball teams and Texas A&M Aggies baseball for several decades.

== History ==
Originally known as Bomber Field, the ballpark was the former home to the Bryan Bombers, who were part of the Lone Star League from 1947 to 1948 and the East Texas League in 1949, followed by the Bryan Sports of the East Texas League in 1950, Bryan Majors of the Big State League in 1953, and the Bryan Indians of the Big State League in 1954. Built from 1946 to 1947 at a cost $45,000, Bomber Field opened April 24, 1947 before a maximum crowd of 2,000 spectators with a 3–1 win for the Bombers over the Lufkin Foresters.

The Texas A&M Aggies baseball team played in the 1959 District 6 playoffs against the Arizona Wildcats at Travis Park because the Bryan stadium seated more than Kyle Baseball Field. A&M lost two games in the double-elimination playoff, both 1–0, to the Wildcats before overflow crowds of 6,000.

From 1972 to 1975, Texas A&M had to play home games at Travis Park, as school officials had taken the Kyle baseball stadium away during the expansion of Kyle Field. The Aggies returned to Kyle Baseball Field for two complete seasons before Olsen Field opened in 1978. (The Aggies began that season in February playing at Travis as the Olsen stadium was not yet complete.)

The ballpark has also used by area school and community teams, and by the Texas A&M Aggies softball team before 1994.

A permanent tenant returned to the field in 2007 when the Brazos Valley Bombers of the Texas Collegiate Summer League began play.

In January 2017, it was announced that USL/PDL soccer club Brazos Valley Cavalry (now known as Twin City Toucans) would play their games at the stadium.

== Sources ==
- "Southwest Conference's Greatest Hits," Neal Farmer, c.1996
