= Jacksonville Tomato Pickers =

Texas Basketball team

The Jacksonville Tomato Pickers were a minor league baseball team based in Jacksonville, Texas, United States that played in the East Texas League in 1916. It was the first known professional baseball team to be based in Jacksonville, and would be the last until the Jacksonville Jax of the West Dixie League were formed in 1934. The team was managed by Arthur Wicks.
