= Paris Rockets =

Minor league baseball team

The Paris Rockets were a Class-B minor league baseball team that played in the Big State League in 1948. The team, managed by Homer Peel, was based in Paris, Texas and featured future and/or former Major League Baseball players Red Borom, Frank Carswell, Merv Connors, Tex Shirley, Dave Short, Jim Walkup and Barney White. The team finished with a win-loss record of 62-85, placing 6th in the league, in its only year of existence under that nickname.

== See also ==
- Paris Red Peppers
