= Sulphur Springs Saints =

The Sulphur Springs Saints were a minor league baseball team that played in the East Texas League from 1923 to 1925. The team was known as the Sulphur Springs Lions in 1923 and the Spartans in 1925.

In 1924, the team was managed by Abe Bowman and Johnny Meanor and featured future Major League Baseball players Sam West and Jack Tising. The team were based in Sulphur Springs, Texas.

The team folded after the 1925 season.
