= Johnny Jones (pitcher) =

American baseball player (1892–1980)

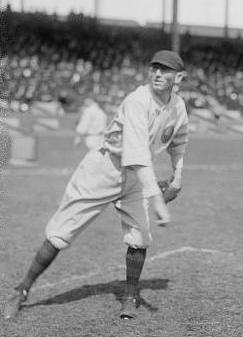
- Pitcher
- Born: August 25, 1892; Arcadia, Louisiana, U.S.
- Died: June 5, 1980 (aged 87); Ruston, Louisiana, U.S.
- Batted: Right Threw: Right

MLB debut
- April 24, 1919, for the New York Giants

Last MLB appearance
- May 15, 1920, for the Boston Braves

MLB statistics
- Win–loss record: 1-0
- Earned run average: 6.06
- Strikeouts: 9
- Stats at Baseball Reference

Teams
- New York Giants (1919); Boston Braves (1920)

John Paul "Admiral" Jones (August 25, 1892 in Arcadia, Louisiana – June 5, 1980 in Ruston, Louisiana) was a right-handed Major League Baseball (MLB) pitcher who played for the New York Giants in 1919 and the Boston Braves in 1920.

== Playing career ==
Jones began his professional career in 1917, playing for the Shreveport Gassers of the Texas League. He went 15–7 with a 1.82 ERA in 24 games that year. Records indicate that he did not play in 1918; however he did play in 1919. He spent most of the year in the minors, pitching for the Toronto Maple Leafs of the International League and going 14–10 with a 2.79 ERA in 32 games. On April 24, he made his major league debut. He made two relief appearances with the New York Giants that year, going 0–0 with a 5.40 ERA.

On August 1, 1919, he was traded by the Giants with Red Causey, Mickey O'Neil, Joe Oeschger and $55,000 to the Boston Braves for Art Nehf.

In 1920, he mostly pitched for the Indianapolis Indians of the American Association, going 20–13 with a 2.52 ERA in 40 games. He pitched three games in the big leagues, starting one of them. He went 1–0 with a 6.52 ERA for the Braves. He played his final big league game on May 15.

He did not pitch professionally in 1921 or 1922. He returned to professional baseball in 1923, pitching for the minor league Norfolk Tars. That year, he went 12–12 with a 2.94 ERA in 41 games. He spent 1924 and 1925 with the Richmond Colts, going 13–5 with a 3.16 ERA in 1924 and 4–9 with a 5.42 ERA in 1925.

Overall, he went 1–0 with a 6.06 ERA in 5 big league games (1 start). He went 78–66 with a 2.91 ERA in six minor league seasons.

== Managerial career ==
Baseball Reference Minors indicates that Jones managed the Meridian Metropolitans and Marshall Indians in 1923 and the Marshall Tigers in 1937. This may be in error though, for multiple reasons: the Meridian Metropolitans ceased to exist in 1913, and the team in Meridian in 1923 was the Meridian Mets. Furthermore, Jones was actively pitching in 1923 for neither the Metropolitans (or Mets) or Indians, so it would seem difficult for him two manage two teams and pitch a complete season with a third team all in the same year.
