= Texarkana Liners =

The Texarkana Liners were a minor league baseball team that played in the East Texas League from 1937 to 1940. The club was based in the American city of Texarkana, Texas and was the cities first professional baseball team since 1929, when the Texarkana Twins played.

The team featured numerous notable managers and players. Bill Windle, Ed Hock and Dolly Gray, who each had major league experience, managed the team at different points. Gray, a pitcher, won 111 games in 10 big league seasons. Outfielders Buck Frierson and Culley Rikard played for the team in 1937. Frierson returned in 1938 and played alongside pitcher Vallie Eaves. Frierson came back from 1939 as well. In 1940, outfielder Charlie Metro played for the team.
