= Gladewater Bears =

Baseball team

The Gladewater Bears were a minor league baseball team that played in the East Texas League (1936, 1949–1950) and Lone Star League (1948). The team was based in Gladewater, Texas and is the only known professional team to be based in that city.

The squad won two league championships, in 1936 under manager Ed Hock and in 1949 under manager Hal Van Pelt. Major leaguers who played for the team include John Burrows, Vallie Eaves, Hock, L. D. Meyer (who also managed the team), George Milstead, Otho Nitcholas Jennings Poindexter, Jim Reninger and George Washington.
