= Travis Field =

Travis Field may refer to:

- Savannah/Hilton Head International Airport, formerly Travis Field
- Travis Field (Bryan, TX), now known as Edible Field
