= George Washington (baseball) =

American baseball player (1907–1985)

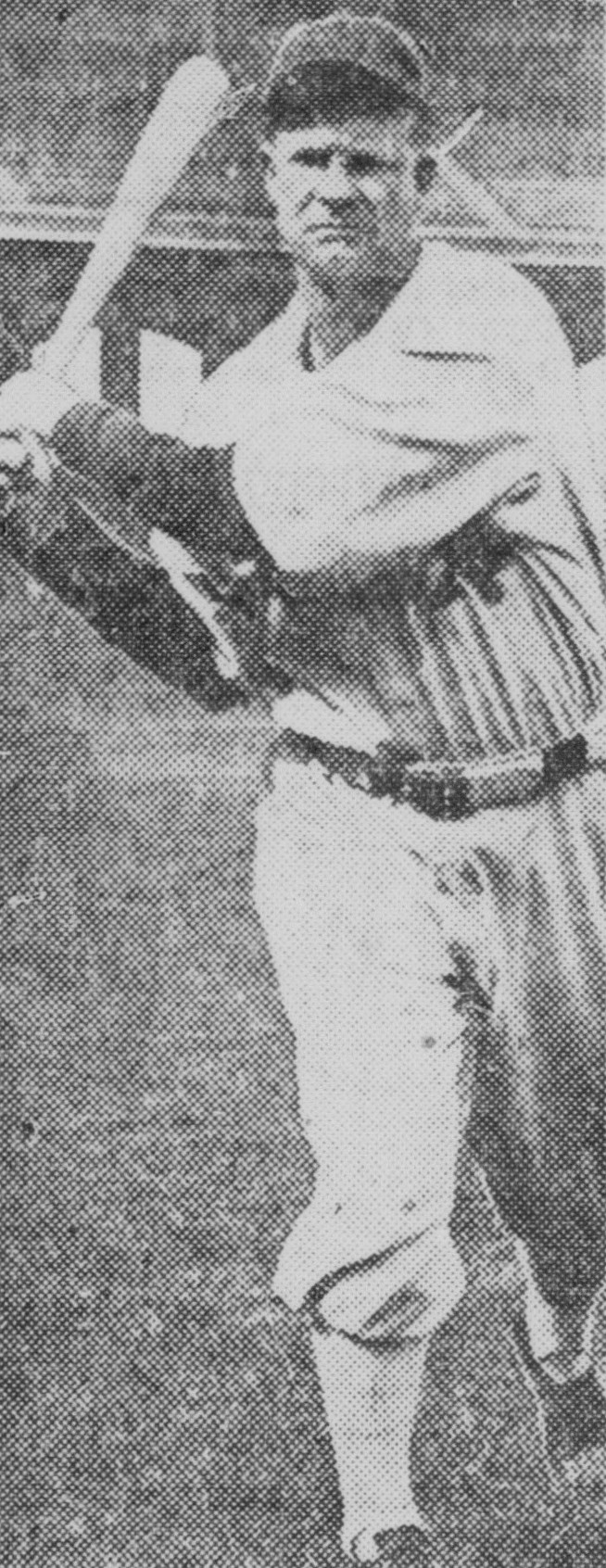
- Washington, circa 1935
- Outfielder
- Born: June 4, 1907; Linden, Texas, U.S.
- Died: February 17, 1985 (aged 77); Linden, Texas, U.S.
- Batted: Left Threw: Right

MLB debut
- April 17, 1935, for the Chicago White Sox

Last MLB appearance
- June 11, 1936, for the Chicago White Sox

MLB statistics
- Batting average: .268
- Home runs: 9
- Runs batted in: 52
- Stats at Baseball Reference

Teams
- Chicago White Sox (1935–1936)

Sloan Vernon "George" Washington (June 4, 1907 – February 17, 1985) was an American professional baseball outfielder. He played all of 1935 and part of 1936 in Major League Baseball for the Chicago White Sox.

== Professional career ==
Washington's minor league baseball career spanned twenty seasons, from 1931 until 1950. He served as player-manager of the Texarkana Bears of the Big State League in 1947-48. In 1949, while playing for the Gladewater Bears, Washington won the Class-C East Texas League batting title at age 42.

== Sources ==
- Career statistics from Baseball Reference · Baseball Reference (Minors) · Retrosheet · Baseball Almanac
