= Kilgore Rangers =

The Kilgore Rangers were a minor league baseball team that played in the East Texas League from 1937 to 1938. It was based in Kilgore, Texas and replaced the Kilgore Braves.

Pitcher Eddie Lopat, who won 166 games in a 12-year major league career, and Dave Short, who played in the major leagues briefly in the early 1940s, played for the team in 1938.
