= George Jackson (baseball) =

American baseball player (1882-1972)

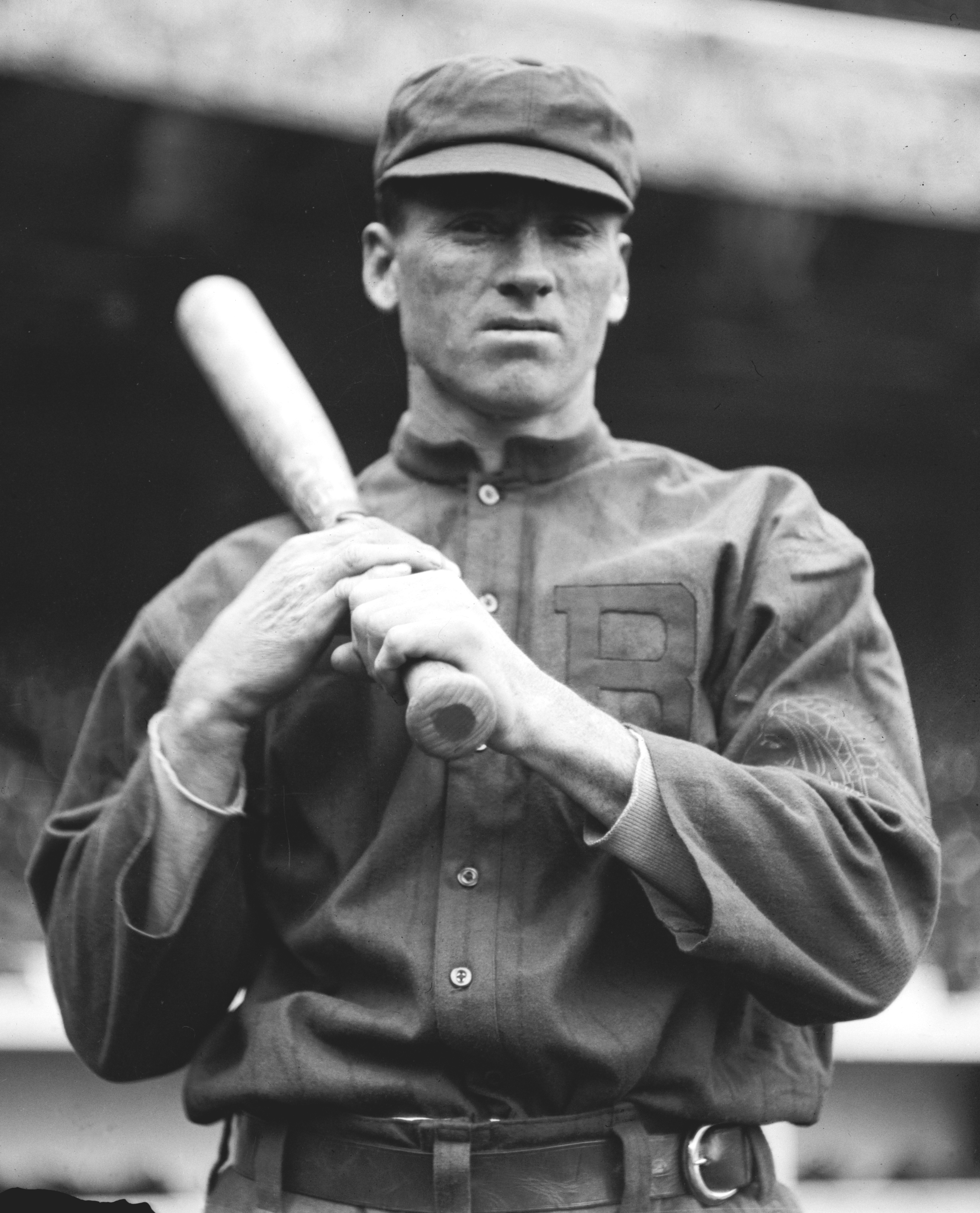
- Outfielder / First baseman
- Born: January 2, 1882; Springfield, Missouri, U.S.
- Died: November 26, 1972 (aged 90); Cleburne, Texas, U.S.
- Batted: Right Threw: Right

MLB debut
- August 2, 1911, for the Boston Rustlers

Last MLB appearance
- April 19, 1913, for the Boston Braves

MLB statistics
- Batting average: .285
- Home runs: 4
- Runs batted in: 73
- Stats at Baseball Reference

Teams
- Boston Rustlers/Braves (1911–1913)

George Christopher Jackson (January 2, 1882 – November 26, 1972), known also as "Hickory" Jackson, was an American professional baseball player whose career spanned 27 seasons, three of which were spent in Major League Baseball (MLB) with the Boston Rustlers/Braves (1911–13). Over his major league career, he compiled a .285 batting average with 85 runs scored, 158 hits, 24 doubles, seven triples, four home runs, 73 runs batted in, and 34 stolen bases in 152 games played. Jackson's professional career started in the minor leagues with the Jackson Senators.

The majority of Jackson's career was spent in the minor leagues. In 1911, he broke into the major leagues as a member of the Boston Rustlers. He spent parts of the next two seasons with the Boston National League club. In 1913, Jackson was sent-down the minor leagues. From there, he played with the Buffalo Bisons (1913–17), Fort Worth Panthers (1918), San Antonio Bronchos (1919), Shreveport Gassers (1920–23) Beaumont Exporters (1923), Tyler Trojans (1924–25, 1927–28), Greenville Hunters (1926), Laurel Cardinals (1929), El Dorado Lions (1930–32). Over his career in the minors, Jackson batted .297 with 2,453 hits, 443 doubles, 74 triples, and 157 home runs in 2,365 games played.

== Early life ==
George Christopher Jackson was born on January 2, 1882, in Springfield, Missouri, to George R., and Elmyra Jackson of England, and Pennsylvania, respectively. By 1900, the Jackson family was living in Hill County, Texas. George C. Jackson worked on his family farm in Blum, Texas, at a young age. In his youth, Jackson recalled loving athletics. He stated that whenever he had any down-time, he would throw a baseball against his barn and catch it, or play a pick-up game with the farm hands.

According to The Washington Post, Jackson displayed a "wonderful" ability to catch the baseball in his youth. He would use a small branch as a baseball bat. Jackson played with the Blum amateur baseball team when he was young. He was given the carfare it took to get to the ballpark by his manager in exchange for playing. Jackson worked as an acrobat at the age of 18. He had five siblings; brothers William, Kennith, and Robert; and sisters Lula, and Elmyra.

== Professional career ==
Jackson's early career

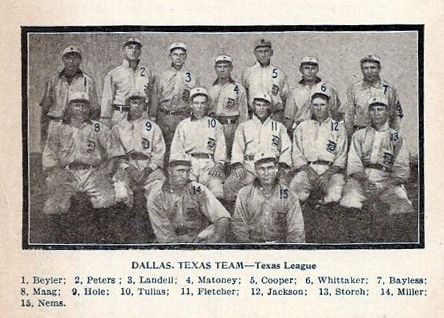
Jackson (labeled 12) spent the 1908 season with the Dallas Giants.

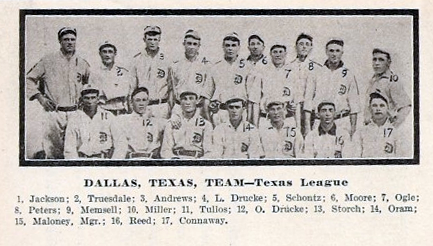
In 1909, Jackson (labeled 1) spent his second season with the Dallas Giants.

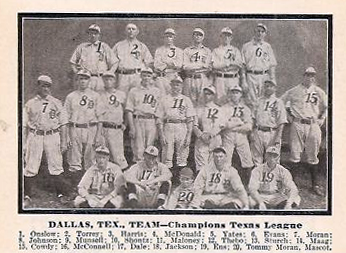
Jackson (labeled 18) spent his final season with the Dallas Giants in 1910.

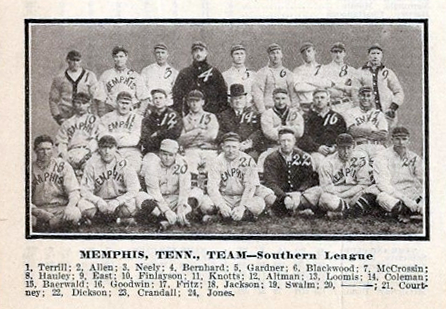
Before making his MLB debut in 1911, Jackson (labeled 18) played with the Memphis Turtles.

=== Early minor league career (1906–1911) ===
Jackson's professional baseball career started in 1906 as a pitcher for the Jackson Senators of the Class-D Jackson Senators. As a member of the Senators, Jackson played with past, and future Major League Baseball players Harry Betts, Orth Collins, Bill Dammann, Tom Gettinger, Billy Kinloch, Jack Ryan, and Elmer Steele. Jackson compiled a record of 1–2 with 20 hits allowed, 16 runs allowed, and eight base on balls issued that season. In 1907, Jackson was discovered by the Dallas Giants of the Class-C Texas League whose management had heard of Jackson through the local newspapers, which described him as a "wonderful ball player". The Giants signed Jackson, and farmed him out to the Lake Charles Creoles of the Class-D Gulf Coast League, where he was used as a first baseman. Jackson was the only player on the Lake Charles club to ever go on to play in the MLB. On the season, Jackson batted .281 with 43 hits, six doubles, two triples, and one home run in 44 games played.

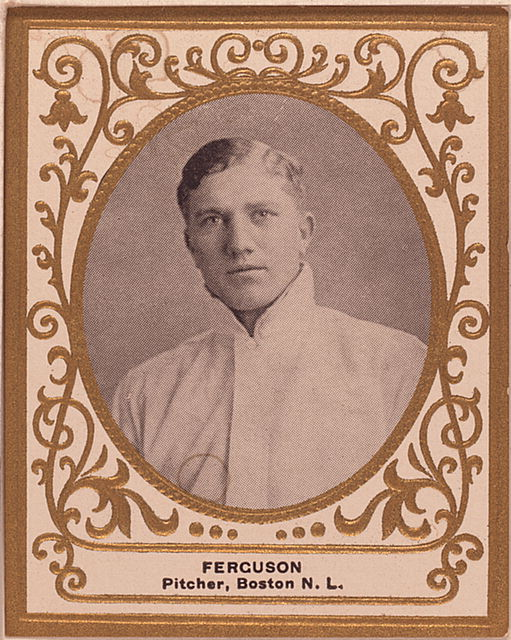
Jackson was sold to the Boston Rustlers during the 1911 season in exchange for George Ferguson (pictured), and cash considerations.

In 1908, the Dallas Giants, who had farmed Jackson out to the Lake Charles Creoles a year prior, asked him to report to the Dallas club. That season, he was used as an outfielder. Jackson batted .242 with 53 hits, 11 doubles, three triples, and one home run in 74 games played. Jackson re-signed with the Giants in 1909. On the season, he batted .271 with 65 runs scored, 117 hits, 21 doubles, three triples, six home runs, and 53 stolen bases in 129 games played. He was tied for third in the league in triples. Jackson again joined the Dallas club in 1910. He batted .280 with 80 runs scored, 144 hits, 17 doubles, seven triples, five home run, and 55 stolen bases in 155 games played.

Towards the end of the 1910 season, Jackson was sold by the Dallas Giants to the Memphis Turtles of the Class-A Southern Association. In those games, he compiled three hits, two of which were doubles, in 18 at-bats. At the start of the 1911 season, Jackson re-signed with the Memphis Turtles. During the season, Billy Hamilton, who was working as a scout from the Boston Rustlers was dispatched to report back on Memphis' shortstop Karl Crandall, who was the brother on MLB player Doc Crandall. When Hamilton arrived in Memphis, he was not impressed by the shortstop. However, he noticed Jackson in the outfield. Hamilton followed the Memphis club for two weeks watching Jackson. Finally, Hamilton reported his finding back to Boston's front office. He was ordered to sign Jackson. With Memphis that season, Jackson batted .260 with 78 hits, 17 doubles, four triples, and two home runs in 85 games played.

=== Boston Rustlers/Braves (1911–13) ===
In exchange for allowing the Boston Rustlers to sign Jackson, the Memphis Turtles was given cash considerations, and pitcher Cecil Ferguson. Jackson made his MLB debut on August 2, against the Pittsburgh Pirates. During his debut, he played center field, and collected three hits. The Washington Post reported that when Jackson "broke in with a bang" with Boston, and that his fielding was "far above par". They also stated that Jackson had an "unassuming disposition", "has all the confidence in his ability", "is fast on his feet", and is a "good waiter". Through late-August, he led the National League in batting average, and averaged a stolen base every game. On August 24, in a game against the St. Louis Cardinals, Jackson his a sacrifice fly in the eight inning to tie the score at 6–to–6, and hit a tenth inning with a run-scoring single, giving Boston the 8–to–7 win. The Reading Eagle described Jackson as a "sensation". With Boston that season, he batted .347 with 28 runs scored, 51 hits, 11 doubles, two triples, 25 runs batted in (RBIs), and 12 stolen bases in 39 games played. Jackson played in too few of games to qualify for the 1911 batting title.

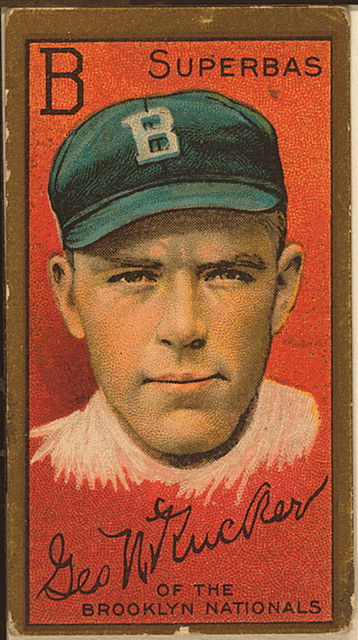
Jackson hit his first career MLB home run, which was inside-the-park, off of pitcher Nap Rucker (pictured).

One month ago if you mentioned the name of George Jackson in the Hub, or, in fact, in most parts of this country, all hands would look with anxious eyes and listen with wide-open ears for some explanation. Now you can hardly find a fan in the country who cannot tell you not only what his full name is, but where he was born, and how many bases he has stolen since coming into the big show.

— —The Washington Post: August 27, 1911

Jackson joined the Boston club, now renamed the Braves, in March 1912 for spring training. On May 30, Jackson hit his first MLB home run, which was inside-the-park, against Brooklyn Dodgers pitcher Nap Rucker. Jackson hit his second career MLB home run on June 17, against Cincinnati Reds pitcher Bert Humphries. Jackson's third home run was also against the Reds, this time off of pitcher George Suggs on August 6. On August 26, during a game against the Pittsburgh Pirates, Jackson hit his fourth, and final home run of the season, which was inside-the-park off of King Cole. It was also the final home run of Jackson's MLB career. On the season, he batted .262 with 55 runs scored, 104 hits, 13 triple, five triples, four home runs, 48 RBIs, and 22 stolen bases in 110 games played. Jackson finished the season tied for third with John Titus in hit by pitches (10), and fifth in strikeouts (72). Jackson was also tied for third with Steve Evans, Josh Devore, Jay Kirke, and Mike Mitchell in errors by an outfielder (15). Jackson played with the Boston Braves again in 1913, but appeared in just three games. In those games, he compiled two runs scored, and three hits in 10 at-bats.

=== Buffalo Bisons, and Texas League (1913–1923) ===
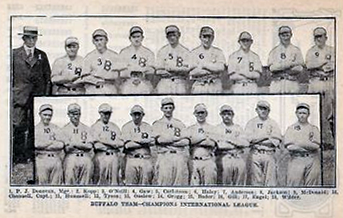
After his MLB career was over, Jackson (labeled 8) played with the Buffalo Bisons for five seasons (1913–17).

On May 14, 1913, the Boston Braves traded Jackson to the Buffalo Bisons of the Double-A International League in exchange for Leslie Mannie. In his first season with Buffalo, Jackson batted .260 with 110 hits, 15 doubles, seven triples, and three home runs in 116 games played. He re-signed with the Bisons in 1914; and batted .269 with 84 hits, 17 doubles, four triples, and four home runs in 97 games played. Jackson spent his third season with the Buffalo club in 1915. He batted .255 with 51 hits, 10 doubles, one triple, and one home run in 78 games played. In 1916, Jackson again played with Buffalo. In 116 games played, he batted .325 with 146 hits, 34 doubles, nine triples, and two home runs. Jackson led the league in doubles. His last season with the Bisons came in 1917. Jackson batted .275 with 111 hits, 20 doubles, three triples, and three home runs in 112 games played.

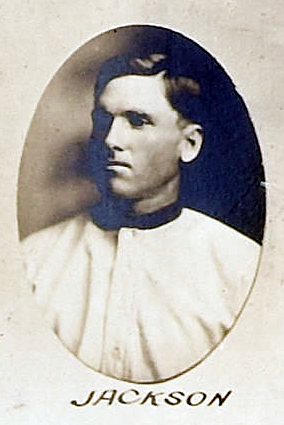
Jackson spent seven seasons (1918–1923) in the Texas League after leaving the Buffalo Bisons.

Jackson joined the Fort Worth Panthers of the Class-B Texas League before the start of the 1918 season. On the season, he batted .305 with 74 hits, 16 doubles, one triple, and three home runs in 69 games played. Jackson signed with the San Antonio Bronchos of the Texas League on June 22, 1919. In September, Jackson suffered a leg injury. On the season, he batted .264 with 75 hits, 10 doubles, one triples, and three home runs in 81 games played. In 1920, Jackson signed with Shreveport Gassers of the Texas League, and played right field. He batted .333 with 164 hits, 31 doubles, nine triples, and six home runs in 133 games played.

Jackson re-signed with the Shreveport club in 1921. On May 5, Jackson hit a single in the eight inning of a game against the Fort Worth Panthers to tie the game at 3–to–3, and later hit a triple in the tenth inning to dive in the winning run, giving the Gassers a 4–to–3 victory. After 38 games that season, Jackson led the Texas League with 14 stolen bases. On August 3, Jackson hit a walk-off home run, giving the Gassers a 12–to–9 victory over the Houston Buffaloes. He batted .310 with 194 hits, 31 doubles, 11 triples, and 10 home runs in 160 games played that season. Jackson was tied for fourth with Joe Connolly in hits that season. In 1922, Jackson batted .344 with 141 hits, 28 doubles, two triples, and 10 home runs in 111 games played with the Gassers that season. He was tied for fourth with Tom Connolly in batting average that season. In 1923, Jackson played with the Shreveport Gassers, and the Beaumont Exporters, both of the Texas League. Between the two clubs, he batted .250 with 64 hits, 11 doubles, three triples, and four home runs in 82 games played.

=== Later career (1924–1932) ===
In 1924, Jackson joined the Tyler Trojans of the Class-D East Texas League. On the season, he batted .371 with 154 hits, 31 doubles, and 26 home runs in 110 games played. He finished the season third in the league in home runs, and fourth in batting average. He played with the Tyler club again during the 1925 season. In 92 games played, Jackson batted .362 with 127 hits, 28 doubles, and 16 home runs. In 1926, Jackson joined the Greenville Hunters, who were also in the East Texas League. He was also employed to manage the club. On the season, he batted .289 with 97 hits, 17 doubles, and 10 home runs in 90 games played. Jackson re-joined the Tyler Trojans, who were now members of the Lone Star League in 1927. He batted .294 with 126 hits, 21 doubles, and 21 home runs in 115 games that year. Jackson finished the season second in home runs. He returned as the player-manager for the Trojans in 1928. Jackson batted .331 with 105 hits, 17 doubles, one triples, and 13 triples in 87 games played.

In January 1929, Jackson attended a meeting consisting of managers of the Lone Star League. However, at the start of the 1929 season, he was hired as the player-manager of the Laurel Cardinals of the Class-D Cotton States League. On the season, he batted .288 with 69 hits, nine doubles, three triples, and one home run in 72 games played. In 1930, Jackson was signed as the player-manager of the El Dorado Lions. The Lions were members of the Cotton States League. Jackson batted .288 with 69 hits, nine doubles, three triples, and one home run in 72 games played. He re-signed with the Lions in 1931. He batted .296 with 37 hits, and eight doubles in 55 games played. His final season of professional baseball came in 1932 at the age of 50 with the El Dorado club. Jackson batted .230 with 20 hits, one double, and one home run in 34 games played. He was replaced as the manager for the Lions mid-season by Clyde Glass.

== Later life ==
Jackson resided in Blum, Texas, with his wife Elizabeth, and their children Finis, Jack, George E., and Evelyn. Jackson's son, George E. Jackson, worked in the oil fields of Texas. By 1900, the Jackson family was living in Hill County, Texas. Jackson died in Cleburne, Texas, on November 26, 1972, at the age of 90. He was buried at Blum Cemetery in Blum, Texas.
