= Bryan Bombers =

The Bryan Bombers were a Class-C minor league baseball team based in Bryan, Texas that played in the Lone Star League (1947–1948) and East Texas League (1949).

Major league players Jo-Jo Moore, Stan Goletz, Jesse Landrum and Mel Deutsch played for the team. Goletz and Landrum also managed it.

In 1953, the Greenville Majors of the Class B Big State League, moved to Bryan on June 25, 1953 and finished the 1953 season playing as the Bryan Majors. Renamed the Bryan Indians in 1954, Bryan moved to Del Rio, Texas on July 28, 1954 and finished the 1954 season as the Del Rio Indians. The team was 17-24 at the time of the move. They finished 53-93. The franchise folded after the season.

The Bombers played their home games at Travis Field.
