= Marshall Browns =

The Marshall Browns were an East Texas League minor league baseball team that played in 1949 and 1950. The team was based in Marshall, Texas and was managed by Walter DeFreitas in 1949 and Bruce Ogrodowski in 1950. Ogrodowski led the squad to a league championship. Mike Blyzka, Red Jones and Bud Thomas played for the 1949 club and Darrell Johnson, Ogrodowski and Thomas were among the 1950 players.

The team was the last pro squad to be based in Marshall, Texas.
