= Lufkin Foresters =

- 1946–1948; Lufkin, Texas

Minor league affiliations
- Class: Class D (1946–1948)
- League: East Texas League (1946); Lone Star League (1947–1948)

Major league affiliations
- Team: None

Minor league titles
- Conference titles (0): None
- Wild card berths (0): None

Team data
- Name: Lufkin Foresters (1946–1948)
- Ballpark: Forester Park (1946–1948)

The Lufkin Foresters were a minor league baseball team based in Lufkin, Texas that played in the East Texas League in 1946 and in the Lone Star League in 1947 and 1948.

In 1950, the Lufkin Angels played a partial season as members of the six–team Class C level Gulf Coast League, before the team relocated to become the Leesville Angels.

== The ballpark ==
Lufkin hosted minor league home games at "Forester Park." The ballpark was located at 112 Shephard Avenue in Lufkin.

== Year-by-year records ==
Year	Record	Finish	Manager	Playoffs
1946	47-92	8th	Hank Doty / Mike "Gus" Mistovich	Did not qualify
1947	72-68	6th	Dixie Parsons	Did not qualify
1948	48-92	8th	Morris "Red" Jones / Stan Bartkowski; Fred Millican	Did not qualify

== Notable alumni ==
- Red Jones (1947; 1948, MGR)
- Bob Marquis (1947)
- Dixie Parsons (1947, MGR)
- Lefty Scott (1947)
