= Kilgore Boomers =

The Kilgore Boomers were a minor league baseball team that played in the East Texas League in 1939 and 1940. It was based in the American city of Kilgore, Texas and replaced the Kilgore Rangers. In 1939, under manager Jimmy Dalrymple, the team won the league championship.

The squad featured numerous Major League Baseball players in 1939: Walter Brown, Clyde Kluttz, Ray Sanders and Tommy Warren suited up for the team. It featured no major leaguers in 1940.
