= Paris Bearcats =

The Paris Bearcats were a minor league baseball team based in Paris, Texas that played in the East Texas League in 1925 and 1926. The team, which was non affiliated with any major league squads, featured multiple major league players, including Jim Battle, Moose Clabaugh, Jim Oglesby, Jack Russell, Red Schillings and Bill Stellbauer. In 1925, under manager Les Tullos, the squad was the league champion.
