= Bob Countryman =

American baseball player and manager

Robert Dee Countryman (October 17, 1895 – November 6, 1964) was an American minor league baseball player and manager and college baseball head coach.

== Biography ==
Countryman was born in Navasota, Texas and died in Houston, Texas on November 6, 1964 (aged 69).

Countryman played in the minor leagues in 1914, from 191620 to '20, and from 192526 to '26 for the San Antonio Bronchos (1914), Fort Worth Panthers (1917), Houston Buffaloes (1918), Greenville Spinners (1919–1920), Galveston Pirates (1919), Mount Pleasant Cats (1925) and Palestine Pals (1926). He managed the Cats in 1925 and the Pals in 1926, replacing Jack Stansbury in the latter campaign. He served in World War I.

Countryman was head coach of the Rice Owls baseball team in 1922 and 1923 and the Texas A&M Aggies baseball team in 1928 and 1929. He had a career college coaching record of 28–31–3.
