= Palestine Athletics =

The Palestine Athletics were a minor league baseball team that played in the East Texas League in 1916. It was the first known professional team to be based in Palestine, Texas, United States and was the last until the Palestine Pals of the Texas Association began play in 1925. The Athletics were managed Richard Brewer. The team was awarded the league pennant.
