= Paris Panthers =

Minor league baseball team based in Paris, Texas

The Paris Panthers were a Class-C minor league baseball team based in Paris, Texas that played in the East Texas League in 1949 and 1950. The team was managed by Jim Walkup in 1949 and featured Major League Baseball player Bob Prichard on the squad that year. It went 75–62 to finish third in the league. In the playoffs, it lost in the first round. Walkup and Joe Weeks managed the team in 1950. The team disbanded on July 20 of that year.
