= Paris North Stars =

Minor league baseball team

The Paris North Stars were a minor league baseball team that played in the East Texas League in 1924. Based in Paris, Texas, the team was managed by Bill Byers and Rollie Zeider and featured future Major League Baseball players Lloyd Brown and Alex Metzler.
