= Sulphur Springs Spartans =

The Sulphur Springs Spartans were an East Texas League baseball team based in Sulphur Springs, Texas that played in 1925. They were managed by Abe Bowman and also featured future Major League Baseball All-Star Sam West.

They did not play the full season, disbanding on June 7.
