= Bryan Sports =

East Texas League minor league baseball

The Bryan Sports were an East Texas League minor league baseball team based in Bryan, Texas that played during the 1950 season. The squad was managed by Bones Sanders and went 23–65 before disbanding on July 20.

The Sports played their home games at Travis Field.
