= Nacogdoches Cogs =

The Nacogdoches Cogs were a minor league baseball team that played in the East Texas League in 1916. The team was the first, and only, known professional baseball team to be based is Nacogdoches, Texas, United States. The team was managed by Tom Cherry.
