= Hub Northen =

American baseball player (1886–1947)

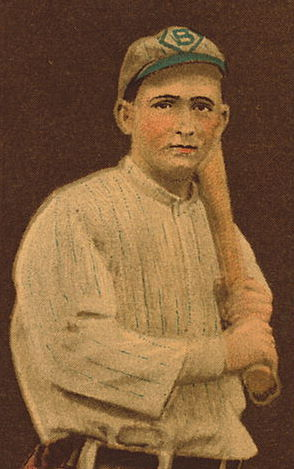
- Outfielder
- Born: August 16, 1886; Atlanta, Texas, U.S.
- Died: October 1, 1947 (aged 61); Shreveport, Louisiana, U.S.
- Batted: Left Threw: Left

Cotton States League debut
- 1908, for the Monroe Municipals

Last East Texas League appearance
- 1924, for the Texarkana Twins

MLB statistics
- Batting average: .272
- Runs: 76
- Hits: 159
- Stats at Baseball Reference

Teams
- Monroe Municipals (1908); Little Rock Travelers (1908); Houston Buffaloes (1909), (1910), (1916), (1917); Fort Worth Panthers (1909); Waco Navigators (1909); St. Louis Browns (1910); Chattanooga Lookouts (1911); Toronto (1911); Cincinnati Reds (1911); Brooklyn Dodgers (1911) – (1912); Newark Indians (1913); Jersey City Skeeters (1913); New Orleans Pelicans (1914); Mobile Sea Gulls(1914) – (1915); San Antonio Bronchos (1918) – (1920), (1922); Mexia Gushers (1923); Texarkana Twins (1924)

Hubbard Edwin Northen (August 16, 1886 – October 1, 1947) was an American outfielder in Major League Baseball who played from 1910 through 1912 for the St. Louis Browns, Cincinnati Reds and Brooklyn Dodgers.

Besides, Northen played at Minor League level in all or parts of 16 seasons spanning 1907–1924.

Northeen was the Dodgers regular center fielder in the 1912 season before being replaced with Casey Stengel when Northen became ill.

In 164 major league games over three seasons, Northern posted a .272 batting average (159-for-584) with 76 runs, 3 home runs and 63 RBIs. He finished his career with a .939 fielding percentage playing at all three outfield positions.

After his retirement as an active player, Northen worked as a scout for various baseball teams, including the Chicago White Sox and the Shreveport Sports of the Texas League.
