= Lufkin Lumbermen =

The Lufkin Lumbermen were a Minor League Baseball team that played in the East Texas League in 1916 and the West Dixie League in 1934. It was based in Lufkin, Texas and the 1916 squad was the first known professional team to come from that city.

The 1934 squad started in Paris, Texas as the Paris Pirates, but moved to Lufkin in late-June. That team featured multiple players of note, including Bob Muncrief, Fred Nicholson, Tip Tobin and Al Unser.

The team finished tied for first place in 1916 and in sixth place in 1934.
