= Mount Pleasant Cats =

American baseball team, 1923 to 1925

The Mount Pleasant Cats were a minor league baseball team that played in the East Texas League from 1923 to 1925. The squad, which was based in the United States city of Mount Pleasant, Texas, featured major leaguers Abe Bowman, Cliff Hill, Gus Mancuso, Randy Moore, Jack Tising, and Max West at different points.
