= Moose Clabaugh =

American baseball player (1901–1984)

- Outfielder
- Born: November 13, 1901; Albany, Missouri, U.S.
- Died: July 11, 1984 (aged 82); Tucson, Arizona, U.S.
- Batted: Left Threw: Right

MLB debut
- August 30, 1926, for the Brooklyn Robins

Last MLB appearance
- September 25, 1926, for the Brooklyn Robins

MLB statistics
- Batting average: .071
- Home runs: 0
- Runs batted in: 1
- Stats at Baseball Reference

Teams
- Brooklyn Robins (1926)

John William "Moose" Clabaugh (November 13, 1901 – July 11, 1984) was an American professional baseball outfielder. He was a batting star in minor league baseball who in 1926 blasted 62 home runs in a low-level circuit, and received an abbreviated trial with the Brooklyn Robins of the National League in the closing weeks of that season. But, hampered by defensive deficiencies as an outfielder, he appeared in only 11 Major League games, made one hit in 14 at bats, and returned to the minors for the remainder of his 16-season career.

Clabaugh was born in Albany, Missouri, batted left-handed, and threw right-handed. Contrary to his nickname, he stood 6 feet (1.8 m) tall and weighed 185 pounds (84 kg). In 1924, his second pro season, he batted over .300 for the first time, and would go on to win five batting titles. But his 1926 season, as a member of the Tyler Trojans of the Class D East Texas League, would earn his MLB audition and cement his reputation as a minor-league batsman. In 121 games played, he hit 62 homers, scored 106 runs, drove in 164 RBI, and batted .376, leading his league in those categories.

His exploits caused the Brooklyn Robins to acquire his contract and bring him to the majors in late August. But because of his poor defense, he was used largely as a pinch hitter, getting into only two games (and one start) as a left fielder; in 11 defensive innings, he made three putouts and two errors in five total chances, for a horrendous fielding percentage of .600. At the plate, he collected one hit, a pinch-hit double off Hal Carlson of the Philadelphia Phillies at Baker Bowl on September 9; it was a key blow in a nine-run, ninth-inning rally that gave Brooklyn a 12–6 victory.

Clabaugh's minor-league career resumed in 1927 and he resumed his heavy hitting in higher classifications, including four years in the top-level Pacific Coast League, before his retirement from baseball after the 1940 season with 346 home runs in 2,098 career games. He died in Tucson, Arizona, at 82 on July 11, 1984.
