= Greenville Staplers =

East Texas League baseball team

The Greenville Staplers were an East Texas League baseball team based in Greenville, Texas, United States that played during the 1923 season. Notable players include Ed Appleton, Uel Eubanks and Chick Sorrells.
