= Rusk Governors =

American minor league baseball team

The Rusk Governors were a minor league baseball team based in Rusk, Texas, United States that played in the East Texas League in 1916. The team was the first (and only) known professional baseball team to be based in Rusk. It was managed by Jack Ashton. It finished fifth in the league standings in its only year of existence.

The origin of the team nickname is not known: although Thomas Rusk (the city's namesake) was an early Secretary of War of the Republic of Texas and later served as a United States Senator, he never served as the state's Governor.
