= Jacksonville Jax =

The Jacksonville Jax were a minor league baseball team based at Ragsdale Park in Jacksonville, Texas, US They played in the West Dixie League from 1934–1935, the East Texas League from 1936–1940, and again in 1946, the Lone Star League in 1947 and the Gulf Coast League in 1950. In 1934, they were affiliated with the New York Giants. They were affiliated with the St. Louis Cardinals from 1935–1938, the Dallas Rebels in 1939 and the Cleveland Indians in 1947.

== League championships ==
Despite lasting a relatively short amount of time (ten seasons), the Jax were able to win multiple league championships. Their first came in their inaugural season, 1934, under the guidance of manager Wally Dashiell. They won again in 1935 under Jimmy Sanders and Jackie Reid, and in 1937 they won under Tony Robello. They won their final championship in their final season, in 1950 under Charles Baron.
