= Paris Grays =

The Paris Grays were a minor league baseball team that played in the East Texas League in 1923. The team, managed by Paul Trammell, finished first in the league standings that season and since there were no playoffs, it was the de facto league champion. It was based in Paris, Texas, United States.
