= Kyle Baseball Field =

Baseball venue in College Station, Texas, US

Coordinates: 30.6072°N 96.3402°W

Kyle Baseball Field was a baseball venue located in College Station, Texas, and was adjacent to the football stadium, Kyle Field. The ballpark was built at the same time as the football stadium in 1904; Texas A&M were one of the original members of the Southwest Conference in 1914 but did not begin baseball until 1915.

== Field conditions ==
In contrast to the more modern Olsen Field, rocks surfaced in the playing field at Kyle Baseball Field because it was built on a previous parking lot. Each day of practice, the team had to line up across the field beforehand and proceed from one end to the other, removing the rocks so the infielders wouldn't get injured in the face from bad hops.

== Field construction ==
The ballpark's grandstand finished in June 1923 which cost $7,500 at the time. Subsequent improvements of Kyle Field in 1929, 1954, and 1969, reduced the size of the Kyle Baseball Field. Because of this, the Aggies had to play the 1959 District 6 playoffs against the University of Arizona at Travis Field in nearby Bryan. Another series of augmentations to Kyle Field forced Texas A&M to move to Travis Field from 1972 to 1975. The Aggies played their last seasons at Kyle Baseball Field in 1976 and 1977. The opening of UFCU Disch-Falk Field in Austin in 1975, led Texas A&M to construct Olsen Field in 1978.

== Sources ==
- "Southwest Conference's Greatest Hits," Neal Farmer, c.1996
