= Marshall Comets =

The Marshall Comets were a Lone Star League minor league baseball team based in Marshall, Texas that played in 1947. Paul Kardow managed the team for part of the year. In its lone year of existence, the team was 76–63, finishing third in the standings and losing the league finals.
