= Wally Dashiell =

American baseball player (1902–1972)

- Shortstop
- Born: May 9, 1902; Jewett, Texas, U.S.
- Died: May 20, 1972 (aged 70); Pensacola, Florida, U.S.
- Batted: Right Threw: Right

MLB debut
- April 20, 1924, for the Chicago White Sox

Last MLB appearance
- April 20, 1924, for the Chicago White Sox

MLB statistics
- Batting average: .000
- Home runs: 0
- RBI: 0
- Stats at Baseball Reference

Teams
- Chicago White Sox (1924)

John Wallace Dashiell (May 9, 1902 – May 20, 1972) was an American professional baseball shortstop. He played one game in Major League Baseball, for the 1924 Chicago White Sox.

Dashiell's professional career spanned 1923 to 1938, plus a single game in 1941. He played over 1300 games in Minor League Baseball, initially in the farm system of the Philadelphia Athletics.

On April 20, 1924, Dashiell appeared in his lone major-league game. With the Chicago White Sox hosting the Cleveland Indians, Dashiell entered the game in the third inning, replacing starting shortstop Hervey McClellan. In three plate appearances, Dashiell recorded a ground out, a pop out, and a sacrifice bunt. Defensively, he had one putout, one assist, and one error. The White Sox won the game, 5–4.

Dashiell later was a minor-league manager from 1934 to 1948 in the West Dixie League, East Texas League, Southeastern League and Texas League.
