= Marshall Indians =

Defunct minor league baseball team

The Marshall Indians were a minor league baseball team based in Marshall, Texas, United States that played from 1923 to 1927 in the East Texas League (1923–1926) and Lone Star League (1927). Notable players include Homer Peel, George Watkins and Elon Hogsett. The team finished with a winning record only once over the course of its existence, and it never finished above third place in the league.
