= Marshall Tigers =

American baseball team

The Marshall Tigers were an East Texas League (1936-1940), Cotton States League (1941) and Lone Star League (1948) baseball team based in Marshall, Texas. They were affiliated with the Chicago White Sox in 1937. Multiple major leaguers, including Eddie Lopat, played for the team.
