= Henderson Oilers =

Minor league baseball team

The Henderson Oilers were a minor league baseball team that played in the East Texas League in 1931, from 1936 to 1940 and in 1946; in the Dixie League in 1933; in the West Dixie League from 1934 to 1935 and from 1949 to 1950; and in the Lone Star League from 1947 to 1948. They were based in Henderson, Texas and played at Henderson Park.

In 1935, 1937 and from 1939 to 1940, they were affiliated with the Detroit Tigers. They were affiliated with the Washington Senators in 1948.

Under manager Ray Honeycutt, the Oilers were East Texas League champions in 1946.
