= Tony Robello =

American baseball player (1913–1994)

- Second baseman
- Born: February 9, 1913; Pahala, Hawaii, U.S.
- Died: December 25, 1994 (aged 81); Fort Worth, Texas, U.S.
- Batted: Right Threw: Right

MLB debut
- August 13, 1933, for the Cincinnati Reds

Last MLB appearance
- September 29, 1934, for the Cincinnati Reds

MLB statistics
- Batting average: .219
- Home runs: 0
- Runs batted in: 3
- Stats at Baseball Reference

Teams
- Cincinnati Reds (1933–1934)

Thomas Vardasco "Tony" Robello (February 9, 1913 – December 25, 1994) was an American professional baseball player who appeared in 16 games in Major League Baseball, primarily as a second baseman, for the 1933–1934 Cincinnati Reds, and later spent 49 years as a scout for four big-league teams. He is credited with scouting and signing Johnny Bench, Baseball Hall of Fame catcher, for Cincinnati in 1965. Robello threw and batted right-handed and was listed as 5 feet 10 inches (1.78 m) tall and 175 pounds (79 kg).

Born in Pahala, Hawaii, and raised in San Leandro, California, Robello entered in baseball in 1932; the following August, he received his MLB trial for the last-place Reds, and collected seven hits in 34 at bats, including three doubles. Three of his hits came on the 1933 season's last day in Cincinnati's last game. He then went hitless in two at bats as a pinch hitter for the 1934 Reds. He returned that year to the minor leagues, where he became a player-manager in 1937, and served in the United States Navy during World War II. Robello was a prodigious power hitter during his prewar days as a playing manager in the lower minors. He led the Class C East Texas League in home runs and runs batted in in both 1937 and 1938. Then, in 1939, with the Pocatello Cardinals of the Pioneer League, he led the Class C circuit in almost every offensive category: runs scored (168), hits (205), home runs (58), and runs batted in (179); his .404 batting average was five points behind the league's batting champion. His production declined in 1940, when he was playing skipper of Salt Lake City in the same circuit, but he still topped the Pioneer League in home runs (with 22) and batted .343.

Postwar, Robello returned to managing in 1946 in the St. Louis Browns' organization and began his scouting career in 1947. He signed future World Series perfect game pitcher Don Larsen for the Browns, but made his greatest imprint scouting for the Reds, to whom he returned in 1962 and where he spent 34 years until his 1995 retirement. In addition to Bench, he signed National League All-Star pitcher Gary Nolan and other key members of the "Big Red Machine" dynasty of the early to middle 1970s. In between his work for the Browns and Reds, he scouted for the St. Louis Cardinals and New York Yankees.
