= Kilgore Braves =

The Kilgore Braves were an East Texas League baseball team based in Kilgore, Texas that existed in 1936. They went 45-106 in their only year of existence, finishing in eighth place in the standings.

Notable players include Harry Boyles, Ray Cunningham, Bubba Floyd, Dick Stone, Oad Swigart and Bennie Warren.
