= Charlie Dorman =

American baseball player (1898–1928)

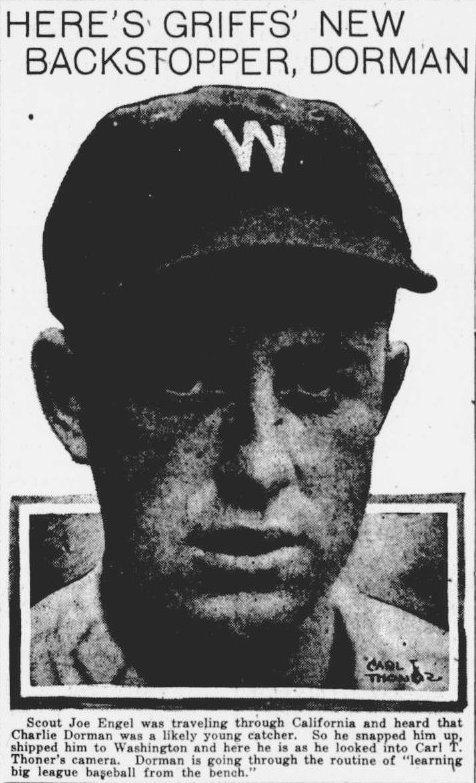
- Catcher
- Born: April 23, 1898; San Francisco, California, U.S.
- Died: November 15, 1928 (aged 30); San Francisco, California, U.S.
- Batted: Right Threw: Right

MLB debut
- May 14, 1923, for the Chicago White Sox

Last MLB appearance
- May 14, 1923, for the Chicago White Sox

MLB statistics
- Games played: 1
- At bats: 2
- Hits: 1
- Stats at Baseball Reference

Teams
- Chicago White Sox (1923)

Charles William Dorman (April 23, 1898 – November 15, 1928) was an American catcher in Major League Baseball. Nicknamed "Legs", he played for the Chicago White Sox in 1923. On his Baseball Reference page, his nickname is given as "Slats," but research by his SABR biographer has determined that is incorrect.
