= Longview Cannibals =

Texas minor league baseball team

The Longview Cannibals were a semi-pro and minor league baseball team based in Longview, Texas, USA that existed on-and-off from 1895 to 1939. In 1912, they officially joined the professional South Central League. From 1923 to 1926, in 1931 and from 1936 to 1939, they played in the East Texas League. In 1927, they played in the Lone Star League; in 1932, the Texas League; in 1933 the Dixie League; and from 1934 to 1935, the West Dixie League.

The Longview Baseball Club had existed as early as 1883, but was named Cannibals on June 3, 1895 when Longview beat the San Antonio Missionaries 7-0. C. B. Cunningham, who was covering the game for the local newspaper, summarized the game by writing, "The poor San Antonio Missionaries were eaten up by the Longview Cannibals today." The name stuck, and from that day forward the Longview Baseball Club would be known as the Longview Cannibals.

They were affiliated with the St. Louis Browns in 1932 and the Chicago White Sox from 1934 to 1939.

They were only the Longview Cannibals for part of the 1932 season, as for part of the year, they were the Wichita Falls Spudders.

Under manager Bennie Brownlow, they won the East Texas League championship in 1926.
