= Palestine Pals =

The Palestine Pals were a minor league baseball team that played on-and-off from 1925 to 1940. The team played in the Texas Association (1925–1926), Lone Star League (1927–1929), West Dixie League (1934–1935) and East Texas League (1936–1940). It was affiliated with the St. Louis Browns from 1935 to 1938 and in 1940.

The team won two league championships, in 1926 under the tutelage of Jack Stansbury and Bob Countryman and in 1928 under Walt Alexander. Notable players include major league All-Star Bob Muncrief and veterans Boom-Boom Beck, Jack Knott, Carl Reynolds and Sarge Connally.

It was the last professional team to be based in Palestine.
