= Jack Stansbury =

American baseball player (1885–1970)

- Third baseman
- Born: December 6, 1885; Phillipsburg, New Jersey, U.S.
- Died: December 26, 1970 (aged 85); Easton, Pennsylvania, U.S.
- Batted: Right Threw: Right

MLB debut
- June 30, 1918, for the Boston Red Sox

Last MLB appearance
- July 28, 1918, for the Boston Red Sox

MLB statistics
- Batting average: .128
- Home runs: 0
- Runs batted in: 2
- Stats at Baseball Reference

Teams
- Boston Red Sox (1918)

John James Stansbury (December 6, 1885 – December 26, 1970) was an American third baseman in Major League Baseball who played briefly for the Boston Red Sox during the 1918 season. Listed at 5 ft 9 in (1.75 m), 165 lb., Stansbury batted and threw right-handed. He was born in Phillipsburg, New Jersey.

In his one-season career, Stansbury was a .128 hitter (6 for 47) in 20 games, including three runs, one double, and two RBI.

Stansbury died at age 85 in Easton, Pennsylvania.

== Fact ==
- Was a member of the 1918 American League champions Red Sox, although he did not play in the World Series.
