= Texarkana Twins =

The Texarkana Twins were a South Central League (1912), East Texas League (1924-1926), Lone Star League (1927-1929) and Cotton States League (1941) baseball team based in Texarkana, Texas, United States. They were affiliated with the Detroit Tigers in 1941.

In 1912, they finished first in the South Central League, becoming the league's de facto champion, as it folded before the scheduled season ended.
