= Guy Sturdy =

American baseball player (1899-1965)

- First baseman
- Born: September 30, 1899; Sherman, Texas, U.S.
- Died: May 4, 1965 (aged 65); Marshall, Texas, U.S.
- Batted: Left Threw: Left

MLB debut
- September 30, 1927, for the St. Louis Browns

Last MLB appearance
- August 21, 1928, for the St. Louis Browns

MLB statistics
- Batting average: .288
- Home runs: 1
- Runs batted in: 13
- Stats at Baseball Reference

Teams
- St. Louis Browns (1927–1928)

Guy R. Sturdy (August 7, 1899 – May 4, 1965) was an American professional baseball player. He was a first baseman over parts of two seasons (1927–1928) with the St. Louis Browns. For his career, he compiled a .288 batting average and one home run in 66 at-bats, with 13 runs batted in.

On September 30, 1927, Sturdy became the first player in major league history to get six hits on his first day in the majors. In the first game of a doubleheader against Cleveland, the St. Louis Browns rookie went 3 for 4 with two RBIs. Sturdy matched his hit total in the second game when he went 3 for 5 with two more RBIs.

Sturdy’s six hits on his first day in the majors is a feat matched four years later but never surpassed.

Sturdy was born in Sherman, Texas. After his playing careers, he managed in the minor leagues for 12 seasons, including one season in his hometown, leading the Sherman Twins to a 70–70 record in 1946. Sturdy died in Marshall, Texas, at the age of 65.
