= Dave Short =

American baseball player (1917–1983)

- Outfielder
- Born: May 11, 1917; Magnolia, Arkansas, U.S.
- Died: November 22, 1983 (aged 66); Shreveport, Louisiana, U.S.
- Batted: Left Threw: Right

MLB debut
- September 16, 1940, for the Chicago White Sox

Last MLB appearance
- April 29, 1941, for the Chicago White Sox

MLB statistics
- Batting average: .091
- Home runs: 0
- Runs batted in: 0
- Stats at Baseball Reference

Teams
- Chicago White Sox (1940–1941)

David Orvis Short (May 11, 1917 – November 22, 1983) was an American professional baseball player. He was an outfielder for parts of two seasons (1940–41) with the Chicago White Sox. For his career, he compiled a .091 batting average in 11 at-bats. After playing for the Chicago White Sox he joined the military during World War II. He was murdered in 1983.

An alumnus of Louisiana Tech University, he was born in Magnolia, Arkansas and later died in Shreveport, Louisiana at the age of 66.
