= Otho Nitcholas =

American baseball player (1908-1986)

- Pitcher
- Born: September 13, 1908; McKinney, Texas, U.S.
- Died: September 11, 1986 (aged 77); McKinney, Texas, U.S.
- Batted: Right Threw: Right

MLB debut
- April 18, 1945, for the Brooklyn Dodgers

Last MLB appearance
- June 3, 1945, for the Brooklyn Dodgers

MLB statistics
- Win–loss record: 1–0
- Earned run average: 5.30
- Strikeouts: 4
- Stats at Baseball Reference

Teams
- Brooklyn Dodgers (1945)

Otho James Nitcholas (September 13, 1908 – September 11, 1986) was an American Major League Baseball pitcher who appeared in seven games, all in relief, for the Brooklyn Dodgers in 1945. The 36-year-old rookie right-hander stood 6 ft 0 in (1.83 m) and weighed 190 lb (86 kg).

Nitcholas is one of many ballplayers who only appeared in the major leagues during World War II. He made his major league debut on April 18, 1945 against the Philadelphia Phillies at Ebbets Field. His lone major league win came eighteen days later in a 10–7 victory over the Phillies in the second game of a doubleheader at Shibe Park.

Season and career totals for 7 games include a 1–0 record, 3 games finished, and an ERA of 5.30 in 18 2/3 innings pitched. Nitcholas walked one batter. He did give up four home runs during that span.

Nitcholas was a manager in the minor leagues from 1950–52.

On January 1, 1957, Nitcholas was appointed the first Chief of Police in Plano, Texas.

Nitcholas died in his hometown of McKinney, Texas, in 1986.
