= George Milstead =

American baseball player (1903–1977)

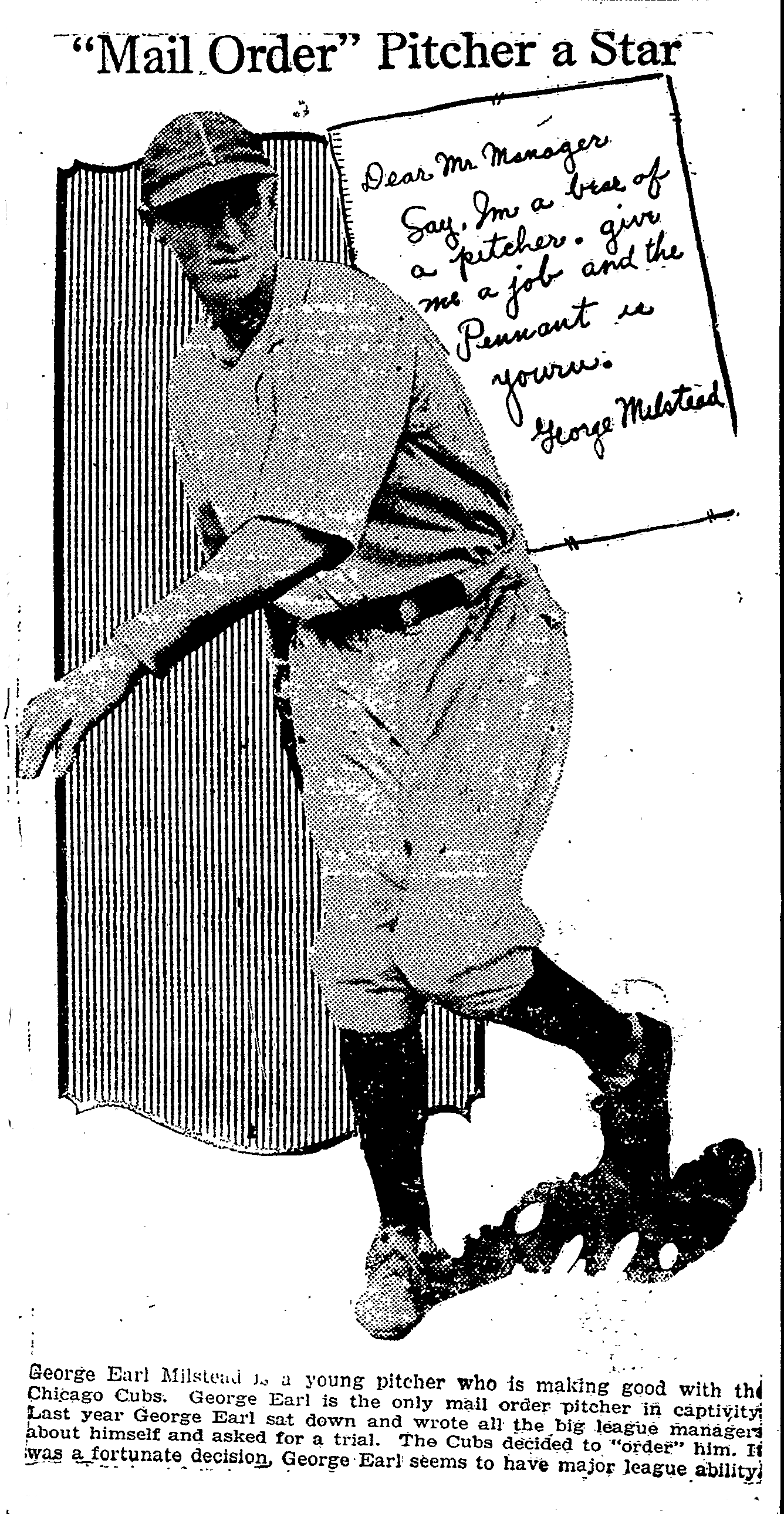
- Pitcher
- Born: June 26, 1903; Cleburne, Texas, U.S.
- Died: August 9, 1977 (aged 74); Cleburne, Texas, U.S.
- Batted: Left Threw: Left

MLB debut
- June 27, 1924, for the Chicago Cubs

Last MLB appearance
- September 14, 1926, for the Chicago Cubs

MLB statistics
- Win–loss record: 3–7
- Earned run average: 4.16
- Strikeouts: 27
- Stats at Baseball Reference

Teams
- Chicago Cubs (1924–1926)

George Earl Milstead (June 26, 1903 – August 9, 1977) was an American professional baseball pitcher. A left-hander, he played three seasons in Major League Baseball from 1924 to 1926 with the Chicago Cubs of the National League.

He pitched in 36 games during his career, starting nine. He won three games, and lost seven. He has a career earned run average of 4.16. In addition, Milstead played 25 seasons for 25 teams in the minor leagues between 1921 and 1950, winning 231 games.
