= Jack Tising =

American baseball player (1903–1967)

- Pitcher
- Born: October 9, 1903; High Point, Missouri
- Died: September 5, 1967 (aged 63); Leadville, Colorado
- Batted: Left Threw: Right

MLB debut
- April 24, 1936, for the Pittsburgh Pirates

Last MLB appearance
- May 30, 1936, for the Pittsburgh Pirates

MLB statistics
- Win–loss record: 1–3
- Earned run average: 4.21
- Strikeouts: 27
- Stats at Baseball Reference

Teams
- Pittsburgh Pirates (1936)

Johnnie Joseph Tising (October 9, 1903 – September 5, 1967) was a pitcher in Major League Baseball who appeared in ten games (six starts) for the 1936 Pittsburgh Pirates.

Prior to his major league career, Tising pitched for the University of Denver. in 1951 He and his wife built and opened Tising Stage Coach Cafe in Buena Vista CO 81211. A restaurant is still in operation today. It is now called Jans since 1991.
