= Ray Flaskamper =

American baseball player (1901–1978)

- Shortstop
- Born: October 31, 1901; St. Louis, Missouri, U.S.
- Died: February 3, 1978 (aged 76); San Antonio, Texas, U.S.
- Batted: Switch Threw: Right

MLB debut
- August 16, 1927, for the Chicago White Sox

Last MLB appearance
- October 2, 1927, for the Chicago White Sox

MLB statistics
- Batting average: .221
- Home runs: 0
- Runs batted in: 6
- Stats at Baseball Reference

Teams
- Chicago White Sox (1927)

Raymond Harold Flaskamper (October 31, 1901 – February 3, 1978) was an American Major League Baseball shortstop. He played in 26 games for the Chicago White Sox in 1927.

In March 1929 Flaskamper was sold by the San Antonio Bears to the Dallas Steers for $7,500.
