= Bill Windle =

American baseball player (1904–1981)

- First baseman
- Born: December 13, 1904; Galena, Kansas, U.S.
- Died: December 8, 1981 (aged 76); Corpus Christi, Texas, U.S.
- Batted: Left Threw: Left

MLB debut
- September 27, 1928, for the Pittsburgh Pirates

Last MLB appearance
- September 27, 1929, for the Pittsburgh Pirates

MLB statistics
- Batting average: .500
- At bats: 2
- Doubles: 1
- Stats at Baseball Reference

Teams
- Pittsburgh Pirates (1928–29)

Willis Brewer Windle (December 13, 1904 – December 8, 1981) was an American professional baseball player. He played three games over two seasons in Major League Baseball for the Pittsburgh Pirates from 1928 to 1929. He went to the University of Missouri. He was born in Galena, Kansas and died in Corpus Christi, Texas.
