= Joe Kracher =

American baseball player (1913–1981)

- Catcher
- Born: Joseph Peter Kracher; November 4, 1913; Philadelphia, Pennsylvania, US
- Died: December 24, 1981 (aged 68); San Angelo, Texas, US
- Batted: Right Threw: Right

MLB debut
- September 17, 1939, for the Philadelphia Phillies

Last MLB appearance
- September 30, 1939, for the Philadelphia Phillies

MLB statistics
- Games played: 5
- At bats: 5
- Hits: 1
- Stats at Baseball Reference

Teams
- Philadelphia Phillies (1939)

Joseph Peter Kracher (November 4, 1913 – December 24, 1981) was an American catcher in Major League Baseball. Nicknamed "Jug", he played for the Philadelphia Phillies in 1939.
