= Bill Byers =

American baseball player (1877–1948)

- Catcher
- Born: October 3, 1877; Bridgeton, Indiana, U.S.
- Died: September 8, 1948 (aged 70); Baltimore, Maryland, U.S.
- Batted: Left Threw: Right

MLB debut
- April 15, 1904, for the St. Louis Cardinals

Last MLB appearance
- June 4, 1904, for the St. Louis Cardinals

MLB statistics
- Batting average: .217
- Home runs: 0
- Runs batted in: 4
- Stats at Baseball Reference

Teams
- St. Louis Cardinals (1904)

James William Byers (October 3, 1877 – September 8, 1948) was an American catcher in Major League Baseball. He played for the St. Louis Cardinals in 1904.
