= Jim Walkup (right-handed pitcher) =

American baseball player (1909–1997)

- Pitcher
- Born: December 14, 1909; Havana, Arkansas, U.S.
- Died: February 7, 1997 (aged 87); Danville, Arkansas, U.S.
- Batted: Right Threw: Right

MLB debut
- September 22, 1934, for the St. Louis Browns

Last MLB appearance
- July 18, 1939, for the St. Louis Browns

MLB statistics
- Win–loss record: 16–38
- Earned run average: 6.74
- Strikeouts: 134
- Stats at Baseball Reference

Teams
- St. Louis Browns (1934–1939); Detroit Tigers (1939)

James Elton Walkup (December 14, 1909 – February 7, 1997), was an American professional baseball player who played pitcher in the Major Leagues from 1934–1939 for the Detroit Tigers and St. Louis Browns.

He was born in Havana, Arkansas, and died in Danville, Arkansas.
