= Tyler Trojans =

The Tyler Trojans were a minor league baseball team based in Tyler, Texas that played on-and-off from 1924 to 1950. The team played in the East Texas League (1924–1926, 1931, 1936–1940, 1946, 1949–1950), Lone Star League (1927–1929, 1947–1948) and West Dixie League (1935). The team was affiliated with the New York Giants in 1935 and 1936, the Cleveland Indians in 1939, the St. Louis Browns (1940) and Cincinnati Reds (1947–1949).

The squad won league championships in 1924, under manager Pop Kitchens, in 1938, under managers Doug Taitt, Fred Browning and Red Rollings and in 1940, under managers Bobby Goff and Sam Hancock.

Multiple Major League Baseball players spent time with the team, most notably later Major Leaguer Phil Weintraub and All-Stars Roy McMillan and Harry Walker.
