= Jesse Landrum =

American baseball player (1912–1983)

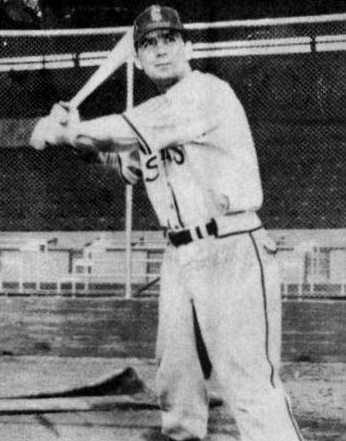
- Landrum with the Sacramento Solons (PCL) in 1946
- Second baseman
- Born: July 31, 1912; Crockett, Texas, U.S.
- Died: June 27, 1983 (aged 70); Beaumont, Texas, U.S.
- Batted: Right Threw: Right

MLB debut
- April 26, 1938, for the Chicago White Sox

Last MLB appearance
- May 11, 1938, for the Chicago White Sox

MLB statistics
- At bats: 6
- Hits: 0
- Runs batted in: 1
- Stats at Baseball Reference

Teams
- Chicago White Sox (1938)

Jesse Glenn Landrum (July 31, 1912 – June 27, 1983) was an American professional baseball player who later became a longtime scout. He appeared in Major League Baseball as a second baseman in four games for the Chicago White Sox during the early weeks of the 1938 season, but played in 1,521 games in the minor leagues between 1937 and 1953.

Born in Crockett, Texas, Landrum threw and batted right-handed and was listed as 5 feet, 111/2 inches (1.8m) tall and 175 pounds (79 kg). He attended Texas A&M University and began his professional baseball career at age 24. In his brief MLB trial, Landrum was hitless in six at bats with one run batted in, and played errorless ball in field the field over 111/3 innings.

Landrum later became a player-manager in the minors in the late 1940s, and then forged a long career as a scout for three major-league organizations. He died at age 70 in Beaumont, Texas, in 1983.
