= Tex Jeanes =

American baseball player (1900–1973)

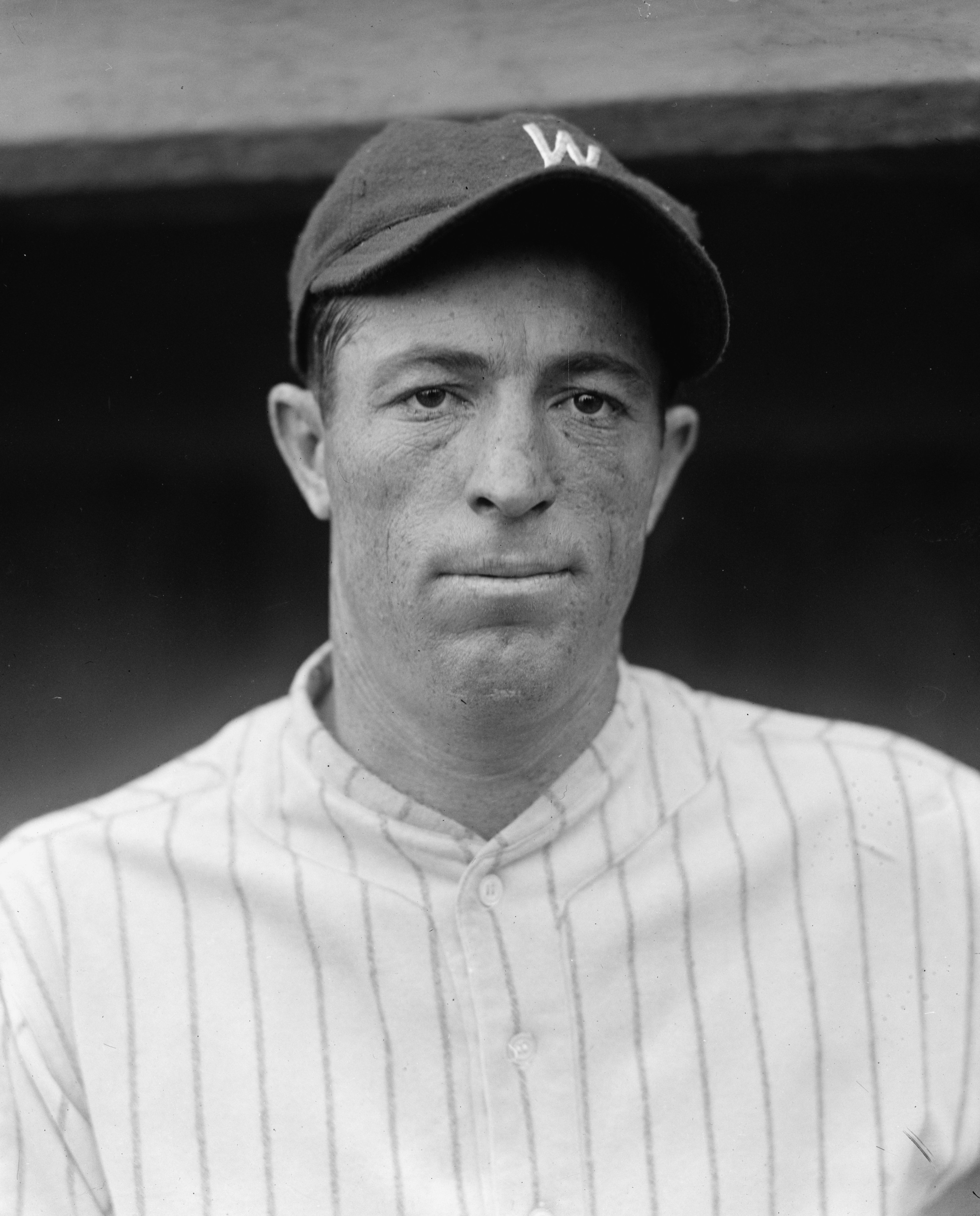
- Outfielder
- Born: December 19, 1900; Maypearl, Texas, U.S.
- Died: April 5, 1973 (aged 72); Longview, Texas, U.S.
- Batted: Right Threw: Right

MLB debut
- April 20, 1921, for the Cleveland Indians

Last MLB appearance
- June 26, 1927, for the New York Giants

MLB statistics
- Batting average: .274
- Home runs: 1
- Runs batted in: 11
- Stats at Baseball Reference

Teams
- Cleveland Indians (1921–1922); Washington Senators (1925–1926); New York Giants (1927)

Ernest Lee "Tex" Jeanes (December 19, 1900 – April 5, 1973) was an American Major League Baseball outfielder who played for five seasons. He played for the Cleveland Indians (1921–1922), the Washington Senators (1925–1926), and the New York Giants in 1927. His uncle was Hall of Famer Tris Speaker.

In 53 major league games, Jeanes posted a .274 batting average (20-for-74) with 15 runs, a home run and 11 RBI. In 149 innings (148 innings in the outfield, 1 inning at pitcher), Jeanes handled 48 total chances (46 putouts, 2 assists) without an error for a perfect 1.000 fielding percentage.
