= Red Jones (outfielder) =

American baseball player (1911–1974)

- Outfielder
- Born: November 2, 1911; Timpson, Texas, U.S.
- Died: June 30, 1974 (aged 62); Lincoln, California, U.S.
- Batted: Left Threw: Right

MLB debut
- April 16, 1940, for the St. Louis Cardinals

Last MLB appearance
- May 14, 1940, for the St. Louis Cardinals

MLB statistics
- Batting average: .091
- Home runs: 0
- Runs batted in: 1
- Stats at Baseball Reference

Teams
- St. Louis Cardinals (1940)

Morris E. "Red" Jones (November 2, 1911 – June 30, 1974) was an American professional baseball player. He was an outfielder for one season (1940) with the St. Louis Cardinals. For his career, he compiled a .091 batting average in 11 at-bats, with one run batted in.

He was born in Timpson, Texas and he died in Lincoln, California at the age of 62.
