= Vallie Eaves =

American baseball player (1911–1960)

- Pitcher
- Born: September 6, 1911; Allen, Oklahoma, U.S.
- Died: April 19, 1960 (aged 48); Norman, Oklahoma, U.S.
- Batted: Right Threw: Right

MLB debut
- September 12, 1935, for the Philadelphia Athletics

Last MLB appearance
- April 26, 1942, for the Chicago Cubs

MLB statistics
- Win–loss record: 4–8
- Earned run average: 4.58
- Strikeouts: 46
- Stats at Baseball Reference

Teams
- Philadelphia Athletics (1935); Chicago White Sox (1939–1940); Chicago Cubs (1941–1942)

Vallie Ennis Eaves (September 6, 1911 – April 19, 1960) was an American professional baseball pitcher. He played in Major League Baseball (MLB) from 1935 to 1942 for the Philadelphia Athletics, Chicago White Sox, and Chicago Cubs.

Eaves died of lung cancer on April 19, 1960, in Norman, Oklahoma.
