= Merv Connors =

American baseball player (1914–2006)

- Third baseman
- Born: January 23, 1914; Berkeley, California, U.S.
- Died: January 8, 2006 (aged 91); Berkeley, California, U.S.
- Batted: Right Threw: Right

MLB debut
- September 4, 1937, for the Chicago White Sox

Last MLB appearance
- October 2, 1938, for the Chicago White Sox

MLB statistics
- Batting average: .279
- Home runs: 8
- Runs batted in: 25
- Stats at Baseball Reference

Teams
- Chicago White Sox (1937–1938)

Mervin James Connors (January 23, 1914 – January 8, 2006) was an American professional baseball player who played 52 games as an infielder in the Major Leagues from 1937 to 1938 for the Chicago White Sox.

Hit three home runs in successive at-bats and just missed a fourth in one game in 1938.

He accumulated 400 home runs with 1,629 RBI during his career in the minor leagues.

He died at age 91 on January 8, 2006, and was interred in Chapel of the Chimes Columbarium and Mausoleum, Oakland, California.

== See also ==
- Chicago White Sox all-time roster
