= Dixie Parsons =

American baseball player (1916–1991)

- Catcher
- Born: May 12, 1916; Talladega, Alabama, U.S.
- Died: October 31, 1991 (aged 75); Longview, Texas, U.S.
- Batted: Right Threw: Right

MLB debut
- August 16, 1939, for the Detroit Tigers

Last MLB appearance
- October 3, 1943, for the Detroit Tigers

MLB statistics
- Batting average: .176
- Home runs: 2
- Runs batted in: 10
- Stats at Baseball Reference

Teams
- Detroit Tigers (1939, 1942–1943)

Edward Dixon Parsons (May 12, 1916 – October 31, 1991) was an American Major League Baseball player. Parsons played for the Detroit Tigers in 1939, 1942 and 1943. He batted and threw right-handed.

He was born in Talladega, Alabama and died in Longview, Texas.
