= Abe Bowman =

American baseball player (1893–1979)

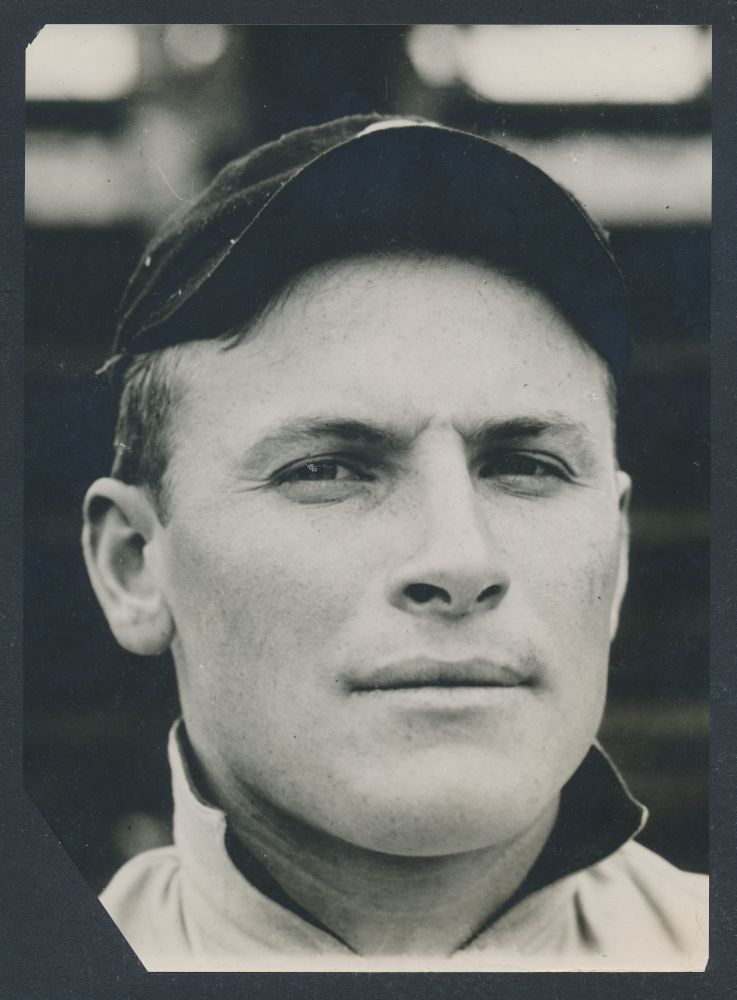
- Pitcher
- Born: January 25, 1893; Greenup, Illinois, U.S.
- Died: October 11, 1979 (aged 86); Longview, Texas, U.S.
- Batted: Right Threw: Right

MLB debut
- May 19, 1914, for the Cleveland Naps

Last MLB appearance
- June 23, 1915, for the Cleveland Indians

MLB statistics
- Win–loss record: 2-8
- Earned run average: 4.74
- Strikeouts: 27
- Stats at Baseball Reference

Teams
- Cleveland Naps/Indians (1914–1915)

Alvah Edson Bowman (January 25, 1893 – October 11, 1979), nicknamed "Abe", was an American professional baseball right-handed pitcher, who played as a swingman in Major League Baseball (MLB) for the Cleveland Naps/Indians, from 1914 to 1915.

== Baseball career ==
=== Minor league career ===
Bowman played in Minor League Baseball (MiLB) for 18 non-consecutive seasons, beginning in 1912; he also managed in MiLB from 1927 to 1933. (At times, Bowman served as a player-manager.)

=== Major league career ===
In Bowman's second year of professional baseball, he was purchased by the MLB Cleveland "Naps" from the Grand Rapids Bill-eds of the Central League, on August 7, 1913. (However, Bowman did not pitch in the major leagues, that season.)

Bowman made his big league debut on May 19, 1914, in a no-decision against the Washington Senators, in Washington — pitching three scoreless innings — in relief of Willie Mitchell. Although Bowman pitched in 22 games for Cleveland in 1914, his role was more limited in 1915. He played the remainder of his baseball career in the minor leagues, last pitching in the 1933 season.

== Death ==
Bowman died at the age of 86, on October 11, 1979, in Longview, Texas.
