= Texas League Hall of Fame =

- Established: 2004
- Type: Professional sports hall of fame
- Website: Official website

The Texas League Hall of Fame is an American baseball hall of fame which honors players, managers, and executives of the Double-A Texas League of Minor League Baseball for their accomplishments or contributions to the league in playing, administrative, or other roles. The Hall of Fame inducted its first class in 2004. As of 2016, 138 individuals have been inducted into the Texas League Hall of Fame.

== Table key ==
†	Indicates a member of the National Baseball Hall of Fame and Museum
Year	Indicates the year of induction
Position(s)	Indicates the inductee's primary playing position(s) or association with the league
Team inducted as	Indicates the team for which the inductee has been recognized

== Inductees ==
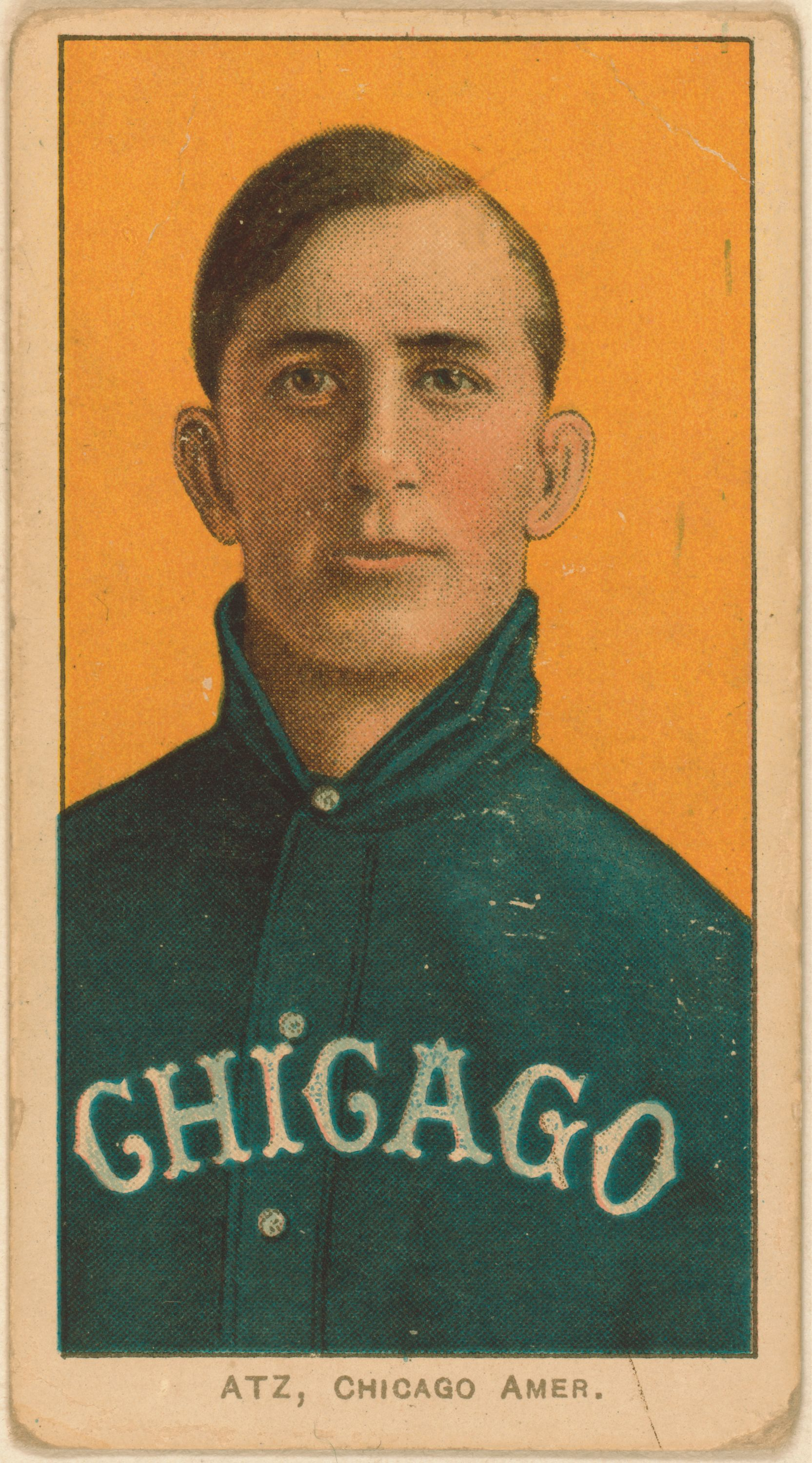
Jake Atz, inducted in 2004

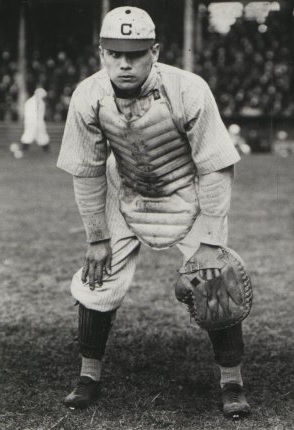
Nig Clarke, inducted in 2015

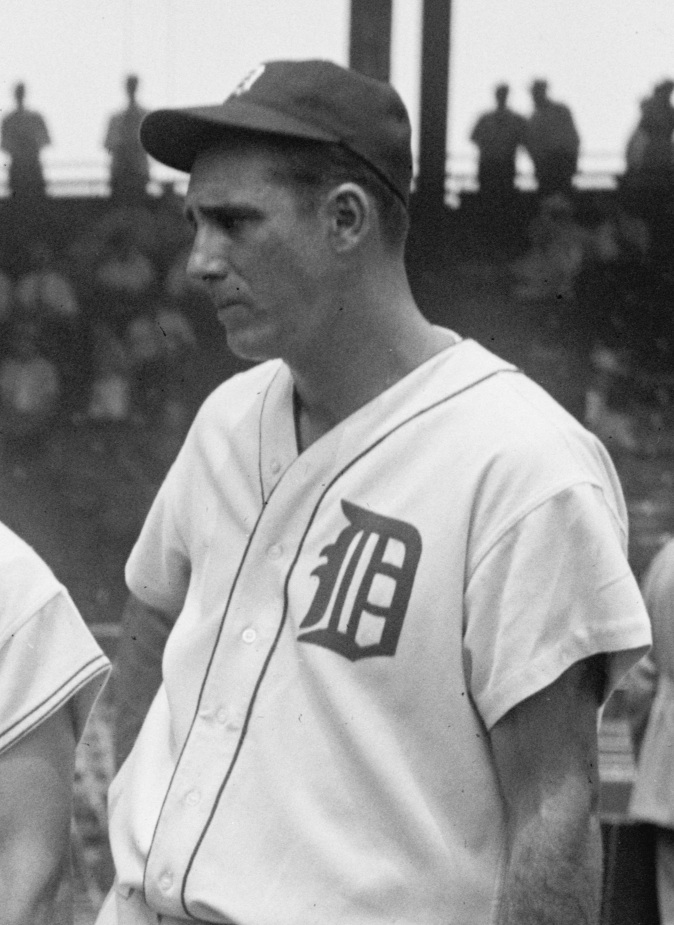
Hank Greenberg, inducted in 2004

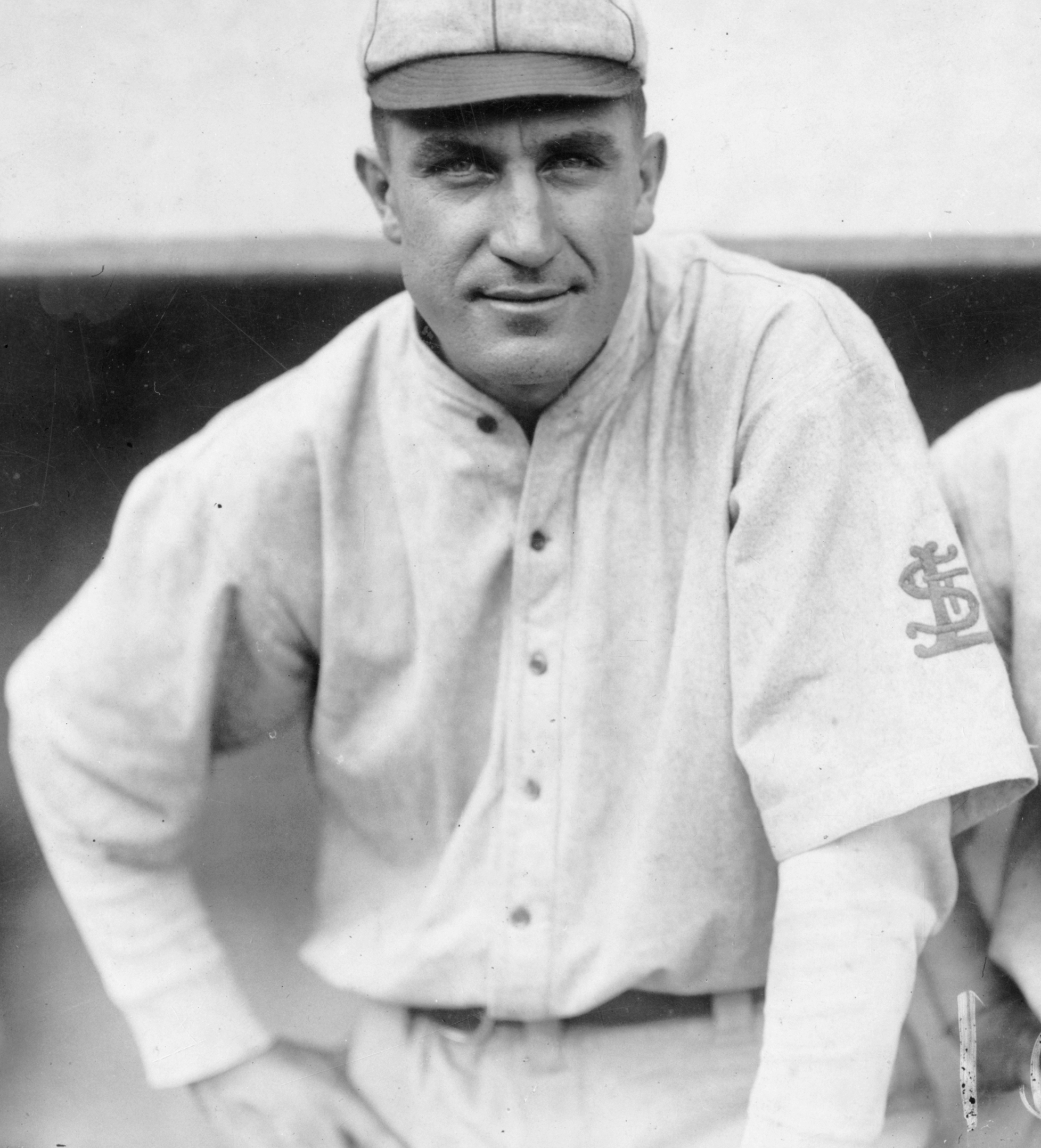
Ed Konetchy, inducted in 2008

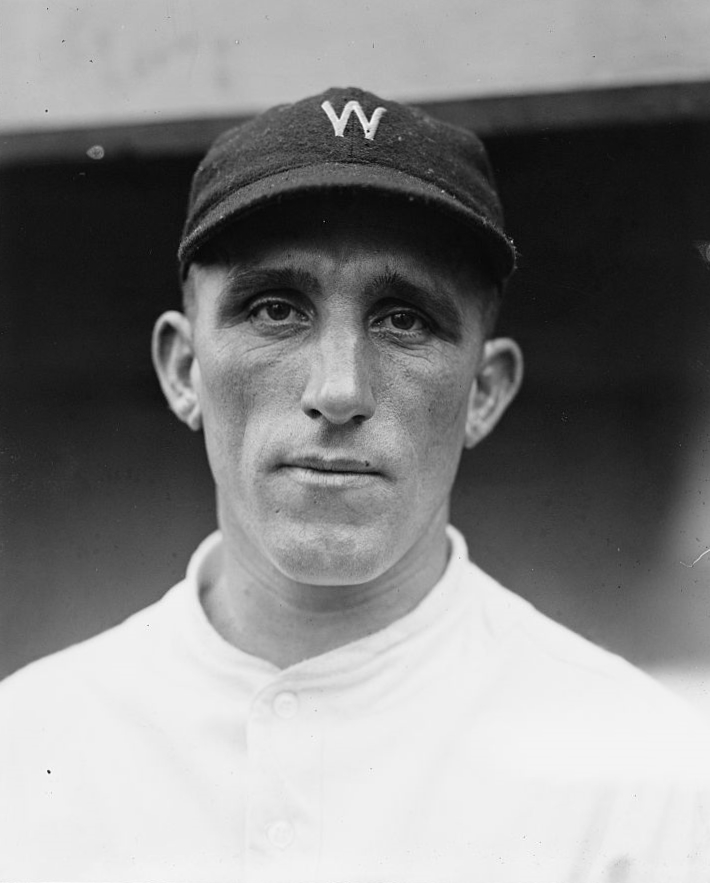
Joe Martina, inducted in 2005

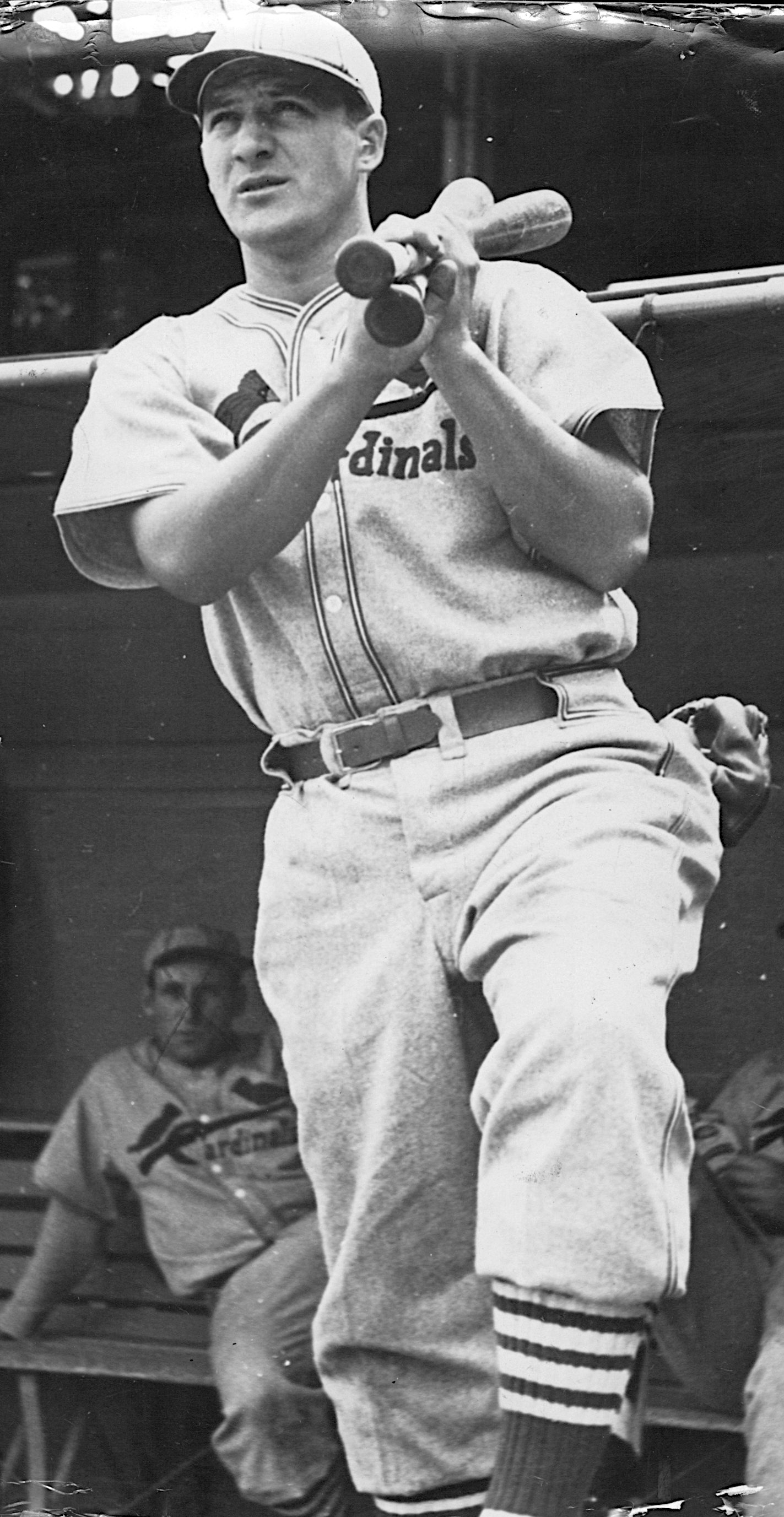
Joe Medwick, inducted in 2005

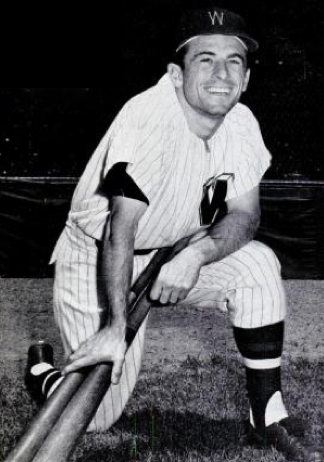
Albie Pearson, inducted in 2014

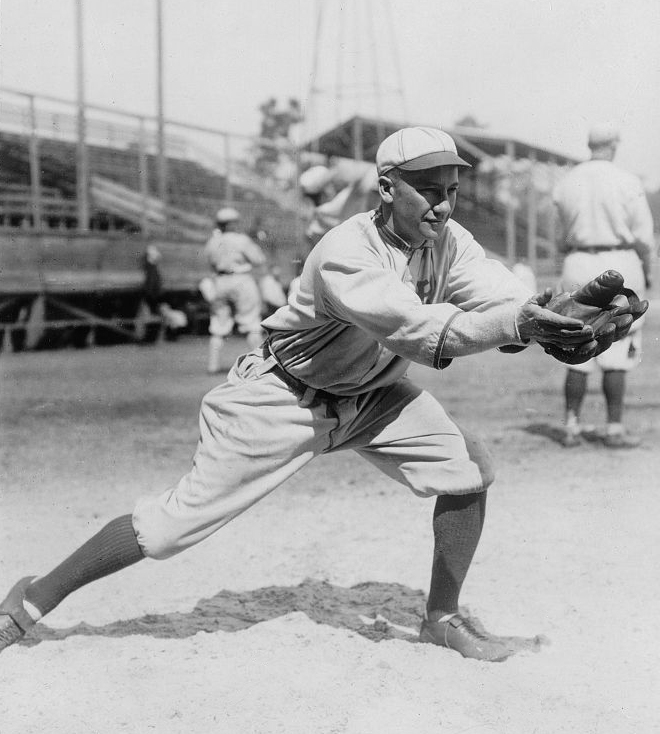
Del Pratt, inducted in 2006

Hank Robinson, inducted in 2011

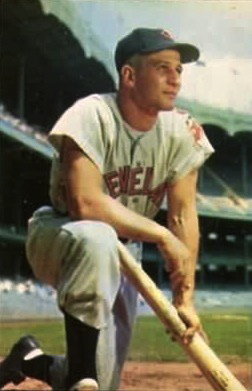
Al Rosen, inducted in 2005

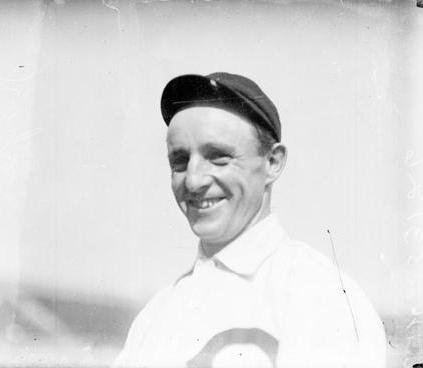
Jimmy Slagle, inducted in 2013

Year	Name	Position(s)
2012	Harry Ables	Pitcher/Team executive
2011	Roy Acuff	Broadcaster
2011	Roberto Alomar^{†}	Shortstop
2004	Jake Atz	Manager
2009	Lee Ballanfant	Umpire
2008	Clyde Bateman	Pitcher/Third baseman
2008	Carroll Beringer	Pitcher
2014	John Bischoff	Catcher
2016	Keith Bodie	Outfielder/Third baseman
2007	Joe Bonowitz	Outfielder
2007	Zeke Bonura	First baseman
2004	Ike Boone	Outfielder
2004	Bobby Bragan	Player-manager/League President
2016	Mark Brouhard	Outfielder
2006	Willard Brown^{†}	Catcher
2004	Dick Burnett	Team owner
2004	Russell Burns	Outfielder
2006	Dick Butler	League President
2007	Earl Caldwell	Pitcher
2008	José Cardenal	Outfielder
2015	Nig Clarke	Catcher
2010	Snipe Conley	Pitcher
2004	Dode Criss	Pitcher
2015	Dick Dietz	Outfielder
2009	Jerry Doggett	Broadcaster
2006	Ed Donalds	Pitcher
2010	Dick Dunavan	Groundskeeper
2012	Grant Dunlap	Outfielder/First baseman
2013	Alex Dupree	Pitcher
2008	Eddie Dyer	Manager
2004	Paul Easterling	Outfielder
2005	Dennis Eckersley^{†}	Pitcher
2013	Ox Eckhardt	Outfielder
2014	Jim Elder	Broadcaster
2016	Dave Elmore	Team owner
2009	Hal Epps	Outfielder
2005	Sid Fernandez	Pitcher
2008	George Ferran	Pitcher
2005	Howie Fitzgerald	Outfielder
2015	Chet Fowler	Umpire
2006	LaVel Freeman	Outfielder
2005	Jim Galloway	Second baseman
2004	J. Alvin Gardner	Team owner/League President
2004	Hank Greenberg^{†}	Outfielder
2004	Ken Guettler	Outfielder
2004	Chick Hafey^{†}	Outfielder
2016	Bob Hards	Broadcaster
2005	Ellis Hardy	Umpire
2016	Harold Hillin	Pitcher
2016	Monty Hoppel	Team executive
2007	Tyrone Horne	Outfielder
2004	Dave Hoskins	Pitcher
2014	Mark Howie	Third baseman/First baseman
2010	Grayle Howlett	Team executive
2006	Went Hubbard	Team owner
2005	Tim Ireland	Manager
2010	John Jaha	First baseman
2011	Gregg Jefferies	Shortstop
2009	Tom Jenkins	Outfielder
2006	Augie Johns	Pitcher
2016	Tom Kayser	League President
2004	Ed Knoblauch	Outfielder
2008	Ed Konetchy	First baseman
2004	Clarence Kraft	Outfielder
2004	Paul LaGrave	Team executive
2012	Chuck Lamson	Pitcher/Team owner
2008	Joe Macko	First baseman/Third baseman
2011	Curley Maloney	Outfielder/Pitcher/Manager
2014	J. Con Maloney	Team owner
2005	Joe Martina	Pitcher
2004	Wilson Mathews	Umpire
2004	Willie McCovey^{†}	First baseman
2004	John McCloskey	League founder
2010	Alex McFarlan	Pitcher/Outfielder
2004	Joe Medwick^{†}	Outfielder
2014	Taylor Moore	Team owner
2004	Joe Morgan^{†}	Second baseman
2013	Walter Morris	Catcher/Manager/Team owner/League President
2004	Red Murff	Pitcher
2004	Pat Newnam	First baseman
2004	Mike O'Connor	League founder
2010	Eddie Palmer	Second baseman/Umpire
2014	Al Papai	Pitcher
2015	Bert Parke	Team executive
2004	Joe Pate	Pitcher
2012	Joe Patterson	Outfielder
2004	Jim Paul	Team owner
2006	George Payne	Pitcher
2014	Albie Pearson	Outfielder
2004	Homer Peel	Outfielder
2012	Cap Peterson	Shortstop
2006	Adam Piatt	Outfielder
2004	Howie Pollet	Pitcher
2006	Del Pratt	Second baseman/Manager
2016	Miles Prentice	Team owner
2009	Randy Ready	Third baseman
2016	Bob Richmond	Team owner
2004	J. Doak Roberts	League president
2011	Claud Robertson	Catcher/Manager
2012	Billy Jo Robidoux	First baseman
2004	Brooks Robinson^{†}	Third baseman
2011	Hank Robinson	Pitcher
2009	Chuck Rose	Pitcher
2005	Al Rosen^{†}	Third baseman
2004	William Ruggles	League historian
2012	Ron Santo^{†}	Third baseman
2015	Carl Sawatski	Team executive
2016	Ken Schrom	Pitcher/Team executive
2005	Ziggy Sears	Outfielder/Umpire
2007	Carey Selph	Third baseman/Manager
2004	Al Simmons^{†}	Outfielder
2013	Jimmy Slagle	Outfielder
2004	Milt Steengrafe	Pitcher/Umpire
2004	Bobby Stow	Shortstop
2008	Moose Stubing	First baseman/Manager
2010	Homer Summa	Outfielder
2004	Don Sutton^{†}	Pitcher
2015	Frank Tanana	Pitcher
2004	Arch Tanner	Shortstop
2011	Pete Turgeon	Second baseman/Shortstop
2004	Bill Valentine	Umpire/Broadcaster/Team executive
2013	Lee Velarde	Groundskeeper
2005	Al Vincent	Manager
2004	Paul Wachtel	Pitcher
2013	Bill Walberg	Broadcaster
2015	Tom Walker	Pitcher
2008	Frannie Walsh	Umpire
2007	Frank Weikart	Pitcher/Manager
2005	George Whiteman	Outfielder
2015	Bill Whittaker	Pitcher
2005	Dick Whitworth	Pitcher
2004	Billy Williams^{†}	Outfielder
2009	Dick Williams^{†}	Outfielder
2013	Don Wilson	Pitcher
2009	Lucky Wright	Pitcher
2009	Hank Wyse	Pitcher
2016	Burl Yarbrough	Team executive
2014	Anthony Young	Pitcher
