= List of Major League Baseball players (Ma) =

The following is a list of Major League Baseball players, retired or active as of the 2010 season.

== Ma ==
Name	Debut	Final game	Position	Teams	Ref
Duke Maas	April 21, 1955	April 23, 1961	Pitcher	Detroit Tigers, Kansas City Athletics, New York Yankees	
Kevin Maas	June 29, 1990	June 20, 1995	Designated hitter	New York Yankees, Minnesota Twins	
Bob Mabe	April 18, 1958	May 5, 1960	Pitcher	St. Louis Cardinals, Cincinnati Reds, Baltimore Orioles	
Chris Mabeus	May 29, 2006	May 29, 2006	Pitcher	Milwaukee Brewers	
John Mabry	April 23, 1994	May 17, 2007	Outfielder	St. Louis Cardinals, Seattle Mariners, San Diego Padres, Florida Marlins, Philadelphia Phillies, Oakland Athletics, Chicago Cubs, Colorado Rockies	
Mac MacArthur	May 2, 1884	June 9, 1884	Pitcher	Indianapolis Hoosiers (AA)	
Frank MacCormack	June 14, 1976	May 3, 1977	Pitcher	Detroit Tigers, Seattle Mariners	
Bill Macdonald	May 6, 1950	May 24, 1953	Pitcher	Pittsburgh Pirates	
Bob MacDonald	August 14, 1990	June 7, 1996	Pitcher	Toronto Blue Jays, Detroit Tigers, New York Yankees, New York Mets	
Harvey MacDonald	June 12, 1928	July 19, 1928	Outfielder	Philadelphia Phillies	
Mike MacDougal	September 22, 2001		Pitcher	Kansas City Royals, Chicago White Sox, Washington Nationals, St. Louis Cardinals, Los Angeles Dodgers	
Harry Mace	May 5, 1891	May 13, 1891	Pitcher	Washington Statesmen	
Macey, first name unknown	October 2, 1890	October 2, 1890	Catcher	Philadelphia Athletics (AA)	
Mike Macfarlane	July 23, 1987	October 3, 1999	Catcher	Kansas City Royals, Boston Red Sox, Oakland Athletics	
Danny MacFayden	August 25, 1926	September 13, 1943	Pitcher	Boston Red Sox, New York Yankees, Cincinnati Reds, Boston Bees/Braves, Pittsburgh Pirates, Washington Senators	
Ed MacGamwell	April 14, 1905	April 18, 1905	First baseman	Brooklyn Superbas	
Ken Macha	September 14, 1974	September 30, 1981	Third baseman	Pittsburgh Pirates, Montreal Expos, Toronto Blue Jays	
Mike Macha	April 20, 1979	May 26, 1980	Third baseman	Atlanta Braves, Toronto Blue Jays	
Alejandro Machado	September 2, 2005	October 2, 2005	Utility player	Boston Red Sox	
Anderson Machado	September 27, 2003	July 28, 2005	Shortstop	Philadelphia Phillies, Cincinnati Reds, Colorado Rockies	
Julio Machado	September 7, 1989	October 6, 1991	Pitcher	New York Mets, Milwaukee Brewers	
Robert Machado	July 24, 1996	September 18, 2004	Catcher	Chicago White Sox, Montreal Expos, Seattle Mariners, Chicago Cubs, Milwaukee Brewers, Baltimore Orioles	
Chuck Machemehl	April 6, 1971	May 7, 1971	Pitcher	Cleveland Indians	
Dave Machemer	June 21, 1978	July 2, 1979	Second baseman	California Angels, Detroit Tigers	
Drew Macias	September 29, 2007		Outfielder	San Diego Padres	
José Macías	May 12, 1999	October 2, 2005	Utility player	Detroit Tigers, Montreal Expos, Chicago Cubs	
Bill Mack	July 14, 1908	July 21, 1908	Pitcher	Chicago Cubs	
Connie Mack β	September 11, 1886	August 29, 1896	Catcher	Washington Nationals (1886–1889), Buffalo Bisons (PL), Pittsburgh Pirates	
Denny Mack	May 6, 1871	September 27, 1883	Utility player	Rockford Forest Citys, Philadelphia Athletics (1860–76), Philadelphia White Stockings, St. Louis Brown Stockings, Buffalo Bisons (NL), Louisville Eclipse, Pittsburgh Alleghenys	
Earle Mack	October 5, 1910	October 1, 1914	Utility player	Philadelphia Athletics	
Frank Mack	August 16, 1922	June 15, 1925	Pitcher	Chicago White Sox	
Joe Mack	April 17, 1945	July 4, 1945	First baseman	Boston Braves	
Quinn Mack	June 16, 1994	June 21, 1994	Outfielder	Seattle Mariners	
Ray Mack	September 9, 1938	September 28, 1947	Second baseman	Cleveland Indians, New York Yankees, Chicago Cubs	
Reddy Mack	September 16, 1885	October 2, 1890	Second baseman	Louisville Colonels, Baltimore Orioles (AA)	
Shane Mack	May 25, 1987	July 30, 1998	Outfielder	San Diego Padres, Minnesota Twins, Boston Red Sox, Oakland Athletics, Kansas City Royals	
Tony Mack	July 27, 1985	July 27, 1985	Pitcher	California Angels	
Pete Mackanin	July 3, 1973	October 3, 1981	Second baseman	Texas Rangers, Montreal Expos, Philadelphia Phillies, Minnesota Twins	
Eric Mackenzie	April 23, 1955	April 23, 1955	Catcher	Kansas City Athletics	
Gordon Mackenzie	August 13, 1961	September 16, 1961	Catcher	Kansas City Athletics	
Ken MacKenzie	May 2, 1960	August 4, 1965	Pitcher	Milwaukee Braves, New York Mets, St. Louis Cardinals, San Francisco Giants, Houston Astros	
Felix Mackiewicz	September 7, 1941	May 20, 1947	Outfielder	Philadelphia Athletics, Cleveland Indians, Washington Senators	
John Mackinson	April 16, 1953	August 29, 1955	Pitcher	Philadelphia Athletics, St. Louis Cardinals	
Steve Macko	August 18, 1979	August 6, 1980	Second baseman	Chicago Cubs	
Rob Mackowiak	May 19, 2001	June 5, 2008	Outfielder	Pittsburgh Pirates, Chicago White Sox, San Diego Padres, Washington Nationals	
Evan MacLane	July 7, 2010		Pitcher	St. Louis Cardinals	
Billy MacLeod	September 13, 1962	September 22, 1962	Pitcher	Boston Red Sox	
Lonnie Maclin	September 7, 1993	October 3, 1993	Outfielder	St. Louis Cardinals	
Max Macon	April 21, 1938	April 17, 1947	Utility player	St. Louis Cardinals, Brooklyn Dodgers, Boston Braves	
Waddy MacPhee	September 27, 1922	September 30, 1922	Third baseman	New York Giants	
Harry MacPherson	August 14, 1944	August 14, 1944	Pitcher	Boston Braves	
Scott MacRae	July 24, 2001	October 6, 2001	Pitcher	Cincinnati Red	
Matt Macri	May 24, 2008		Third baseman	Minnesota Twins	
Jimmy Macullar	May 5, 1879	October 14, 1886	Shortstop	Syracuse Stars (NL), Cincinnati Red Stockings (AA), Baltimore Orioles (AA)	
Keith MacWhorter	May 10, 1980	October 5, 1980	Pitcher	Boston Red Sox	
Bunny Madden	June 3, 1909	September 21, 1911	Catcher	Boston Red Sox, Philadelphia Phillies	
Frank Madden	July 4, 1914	August 5, 1914	Catcher	Pittsburgh Rebels	
Gene Madden	April 20, 1916	April 20, 1916	Pinch hitter	Pittsburgh Pirates	
Kid Madden	May 16, 1887	October 6, 1891	Pitcher	Boston Beaneaters, Boston Reds (1890–91), Baltimore Orioles (AA)	
Len Madden	August 31, 1912	September 19, 1912	Pitcher	Chicago Cubs	
Mike Madden	April 5, 1983	June 11, 1986	Pitcher	Houston Astros	
Morris Madden	June 11, 1987	June 23, 1989	Pitcher	Detroit Tigers, Pittsburgh Pirates	
Tommy Madden	September 10, 1906	April 15, 1910	Outfielder	Boston Beaneaters, New York Highlanders	
Clarence Maddern	September 19, 1946	September 25, 1951	Outfielder	Chicago Cubs, Cleveland Indians	
Elliott Maddox	April 7, 1970	October 1, 1980	Outfielder	Detroit Tigers, Washington Senators (1961–1971), Texas Rangers, New York Yankees, Baltimore Orioles, New York Mets	
Garry Maddox	April 25, 1972	April 20, 1986	Outfielder	San Francisco Giants, Philadelphia Phillies	
Jerry Maddox	June 3, 1978	June 16, 1978	Third baseman	Atlanta Braves	
Nick Maddox	September 13, 1907	September 12, 1910	Pitcher	Pittsburgh Pirates	
Greg Maddux	September 3, 1986	September 27, 2008	Pitcher	Chicago Cubs, Atlanta Braves, Los Angeles Dodgers, San Diego Padres	
Mike Maddux	June 3, 1986	July 4, 2000	Pitcher	Philadelphia Phillies, San Diego Padres, Los Angeles Dodgers, New York Mets, Pittsburgh Pirates, Boston Red Sox, Seattle Mariners, Montreal Expos, Los Angeles Dodgers, Houston Astros	
Tony Madigan	July 10, 1886	September 4, 1886	Pitcher	Washington Nationals (1886–1889)	
Art Madison	September 9, 1895	August 22, 1899	Utility infielder	Philadelphia Phillies, Pittsburgh Pirates	
Dave Madison	September 26, 1950	August 20, 1953	Pitcher	New York Yankees, St. Louis Browns, Detroit Tigers	
Scotti Madison	July 6, 1985	October 1, 1989	Third baseman	Detroit Tigers, Kansas City Royals, Cincinnati Reds	
Ed Madjeski	May 2, 1932	October 3, 1937	Catcher	Philadelphia Athletics, Chicago White Sox, New York Giants	
Bill Madlock	September 7, 1973	October 4, 1987	Third baseman	Texas Rangers, Chicago Cubs, San Francisco Giants, Pittsburgh Pirates, Los Angeles Dodgers, Detroit Tigers	
Alex Madrid	July 20, 1987	May 30, 1989	Pitcher	Milwaukee Brewers, Philadelphia Phillies	
Sal Madrid	September 17, 1947	September 28, 1947	Shortstop	Chicago Cubs	
Warner Madrigal	July 2, 2008		Pitcher	Texas Rangers	
Bobby Madritsch	July 21, 2004	April 6, 2005	Pitcher	Seattle Mariners	
Ryan Madson	September 27, 2003		Pitcher	Philadelphia Phillies	
Calvin Maduro	September 8, 1996	June 4, 2002	Pitcher	Philadelphia Phillies, Baltimore Orioles	
Héctor Maestri	September 24, 1960	September 17, 1961	Pitcher	Washington Senators, Washington Senators (1961–1971)	
Dave Magadan	September 7, 1986	September 26, 2001	Utility infielder	New York Mets, Florida Marlins, Seattle Mariners, Houston Astros, Chicago Cubs, Oakland Athletics, San Diego Padres	
Ever Magallanes	May 17, 1991	May 22, 1991	Shortstop	Cleveland Indians	
Bill Magee	May 18, 1897	June 7, 1902	Pitcher	Louisville Colonels, Philadelphia Phillies, Washington Senators (NL), St. Louis Cardinals, New York Giants	
Lee Magee	July 4, 1911	September 28, 1919	Outfielder	St. Louis Cardinals, Brooklyn Tip-Tops, New York Yankees, St. Louis Browns, Cincinnati Reds, Brooklyn Robins, Chicago Cubs	
Sherry Magee	June 29, 1904	September 27, 1919	Outfielder	Philadelphia Phillies, Boston Braves, Cincinnati Reds	
Wendell Magee	August 16, 1996	September 1, 2002	Outfielder	Philadelphia Phillies, Detroit Tigers	
Harl Maggert (1910s OF)	September 4, 1907	October 3, 1912	Outfielder	Pittsburgh Pirates, Philadelphia Athletics	
Harl Maggert (1930s OF)	April 19, 1938	October 1, 1938	Outfielder	Boston Bees	
Sal Maglie	August 9, 1945	August 31, 1958	Pitcher	New York Giants, Cleveland Indians, Brooklyn Dodgers, New York Yankees, St. Louis Cardinals	
Mike Magnante	April 22, 1991	July 29, 2002	Pitcher	Kansas City Royals, Houston Astros, Anaheim Angels, Oakland Athletics	
John Magner	July 14, 1879	July 14, 1879	Outfielder	Cincinnati Reds (1876–1880)	
Stubby Magner	July 12, 1911	September 30, 1911	Utility infielder	New York Highlanders	
Jim Magnuson	June 28, 1970	May 27, 1973	Pitcher	Chicago White Sox, New York Yankees	
Trystan Magnuson	May 17, 2011		Pitcher	Oakland Athletics	
George Magoon	June 29, 1898	September 28, 1903	Shortstop	Brooklyn Bridegrooms, Baltimore Orioles (NL), Chicago Orphans, Cincinnati Reds, Chicago White Sox	
Joe Magrane	April 25, 1987	June 21, 1996	Pitcher	St. Louis Cardinals, California Angels, Chicago White Sox	
Tom Magrann	September 7, 1989	October 1, 1989	Catcher	Cleveland Indians	
Pete Magrini	April 13, 1966	May 9, 1966	Pitcher	Boston Red Sox	
Chris Magruder	September 4, 2001	September 28, 2005	Outfielder	Texas Rangers, Cleveland Indians, Milwaukee Brewers	
Freddie Maguire	September 22, 1922	September 27, 1931	Second baseman	New York Giants, Chicago Cubs, Boston Braves	
Jack Maguire	April 18, 1950	September 9, 1951	Outfielder	New York Giants, Pittsburgh Pirates, St. Louis Browns	
Jim Mahady	October 2, 1921	October 2, 1921	Second baseman	New York Giants	
Art Mahaffey	July 30, 1960	July 17, 1966	Pitcher	Philadelphia Phillies, St. Louis Cardinals	
Lou Mahaffey	April 26, 1898	April 26, 1898	Pitcher	Louisville Colonels	
Roy Mahaffey	August 31, 1926	July 28, 1936	Pitcher	Pittsburgh Pirates, Philadelphia Athletics, St. Louis Browns	
Art Mahan	April 30, 1940	September 29, 1940	First baseman	Philadelphia Phillies	
Frank Mahar	August 29, 1902	August 29, 1902	Outfielder	Philadelphia Phillies	
Kevin Mahar	May 16, 2007		Outfielder	Texas Rangers	
Billy Maharg	May 18, 1912	October 5, 1916	Utility player	Detroit Tigers, Philadelphia Phillies	
Ron Mahay	May 21, 1995		Pitcher	Boston Red Sox, Oakland Athletics, Florida Marlins, Chicago Cubs, Texas Rangers, Atlanta Braves, Kansas City Royals, Minnesota Twins	
Tom Maher	April 24, 1902	April 26, 1902	Pinch hitter	Philadelphia Phillies	
Greg Mahlberg	September 24, 1978	September 30, 1979	Catcher	Texas Rangers	
Mickey Mahler	September 13, 1977	September 28, 1986	Pitcher	Atlanta Braves, Pittsburgh Pirates, California Angels, Montreal Expos, Detroit Tigers, Texas Rangers, Toronto Blue Jays	
Rick Mahler	April 20, 1979	August 6, 1991	Pitcher	Atlanta Braves, Cincinnati Reds, Montreal Expos	
Paul Maholm	August 30, 2005		Pitcher	Pittsburgh Pirates	
Pat Mahomes	April 12, 1992	August 26, 2003	Pitcher	Minnesota Twins, Boston Red Sox, New York Mets, Texas Rangers, Chicago Cubs, Pittsburgh Pirates	
Al Mahon	April 22, 1930	May 11, 1930	Pitcher	Philadelphia Athletics	
Bob Mahoney	May 3, 1951	June 14, 1952	Pitcher	Chicago White Sox, St. Louis Browns	
Chris Mahoney	July 12, 1910	October 8, 1910	Pitcher	Boston Red Sox	
Dan Mahoney	August 20, 1892	July 30, 1895	Catcher	Cincinnati Reds, Washington Senators (NL)	
Danny Mahoney	May 15, 1911	May 15, 1911	Pinch runner	Cincinnati Reds	
Jim Mahoney	July 28, 1959	June 14, 1965	Shortstop	Boston Red Sox, Washington Senators (1961–1971), Cleveland Indians, Houston Astros	
Mike Mahoney (1B)	May 18, 1897	April 17, 1898	First baseman	Boston Beaneaters, St. Louis Browns (NL)	
Mike Mahoney (C)	September 8, 2000	September 24, 2005	Catcher	Chicago Cubs, St. Louis Cardinals	
Bob Maier	April 17, 1945	September 20, 1945	Third baseman	Detroit Tigers	
Mitch Maier	September 23, 2006		Outfielder	Kansas City Royals	
Emil Mailho	April 14, 1936	June 4, 1936	Outfielder	Philadelphia Athletics	
Duster Mails	September 28, 1915	April 29, 1926	Pitcher	Brooklyn Robins, Cleveland Indians, St. Louis Cardinals	
Alex Main	April 18, 1914	June 29, 1918	Pitcher	Detroit Tigers, Kansas City Packers, Philadelphia Phillies	
Woody Main	April 21, 1948	April 28, 1953	Pitcher	Pittsburgh Pirates	
John Maine	July 23, 2004		Pitcher	Baltimore Orioles, New York Mets	
Scott Maine	August 27, 2010		Pitcher	Chicago Cubs	
Jim Mains	August 22, 1943	August 22, 1943	Pitcher	Philadelphia Athletics	
Willard Mains	August 3, 1888	June 2, 1896	Pitcher	Chicago White Stockings, Cincinnati Kelly's Killers, Milwaukee Brewers (AA), Boston Beaneaters	
Oswaldo Mairena	September 5, 2000	September 28, 2002	Pitcher	Chicago Cubs, Florida Marlins	
Charlie Maisel	October 2, 1915	October 2, 1915	Catcher	Baltimore Terrapins	
Fritz Maisel	August 11, 1913	August 28, 1918	Third baseman	New York Yankees, St. Louis Browns	
George Maisel	May 1, 1913	September 30, 1922	Outfielder	St. Louis Browns, Detroit Tigers, Chicago Cubs	
Hank Majeski	May 17, 1939	July 26, 1955	Third baseman	Boston Bees/Braves, New York Yankees, Philadelphia Athletics, Chicago White Sox, Cleveland Indians, Baltimore Orioles	
Gary Majewski	August 26, 2004		Pitcher	Montreal Expos, Washington Nationals, Cincinnati Reds, Houston Astros	
Val Majewski	August 20, 2004	September 8, 2004	Outfielder	Baltimore Orioles	
Frank Makosky	April 30, 1937	September 30, 1937	Pitcher	New York Yankees	
Tom Makowski	May 1, 1975	May 23, 1975	Pitcher	Detroit Tigers	
Mike Maksudian	September 2, 1992	August 10, 1994	First baseman	Toronto Blue Jays, Minnesota Twins, Chicago Cubs	
Bill Malarkey	April 16, 1908	August 16, 1908	Pitcher	New York Giants	
John Malarkey	September 21, 1894	September 20, 1903	Pitcher	Washington Senators (NL), Chicago Orphans, Boston Beaneaters	
Mark Malaska	July 17, 2003	July 24, 2004	Pitcher	Tampa Bay Devil Rays, Boston Red Sox	
José Malavé	May 23, 1996	August 30, 1997	Outfielder	Boston Red Sox	
Charlie Malay	April 24, 1905	October 7, 1905	Second baseman	Brooklyn Superbas	
Joe Malay	September 7, 1933	April 19, 1935	First baseman	New York Giants	
Candy Maldonado	September 7, 1981	September 29, 1995	Outfielder	Los Angeles Dodgers, San Francisco Giants, Cleveland Indians, Milwaukee Brewers, Toronto Blue Jays, Chicago Cubs, Texas Rangers	
Carlos Maldonado (P)	September 16, 1990	October 3, 1993	Pitcher	Kansas City Royals, Milwaukee Brewers	
Carlos Maldonado (C)	September 8, 2006		Catcher	Pittsburgh Pirates, Washington Nationals	
Martín Maldonado	September 3, 2011		Catcher	Milwaukee Brewers	
Jim Maler	September 3, 1981	July 24, 1983	First baseman	Seattle Mariners	
Tony Malinosky	April 26, 1937	July 16, 1937	Utility infielder	Brooklyn Dodgers	
Cy Malis	August 17, 1934	August 17, 1934	Pitcher	Philadelphia Phillies	
Bobby Malkmus	June 1, 1957	May 15, 1962	Second baseman	Milwaukee Braves, Washington Senators, Philadelphia Phillies	
Jerry Mallett	September 19, 1959	September 27, 1959	Outfielder	Boston Red Sox	
Brian Mallette	April 12, 2002	May 23, 2002	Pitcher	Milwaukee Brewers	
Mal Mallette	September 25, 1950	September 29, 1950	Pitcher	Brooklyn Dodgers	
Rob Mallicoat	September 11, 1987	September 22, 1992	Pitcher	Houston Astros	
Les Mallon	April 14, 1931	September 29, 1935	Second baseman	Philadelphia Phillies, Boston Braves	
Ben Mallonee	September 14, 1921	September 23, 1921	Outfielder	Philadelphia Athletics	
Jule Mallonee	August 4, 1925	August 23, 1925	Outfielder	Chicago White Sox	
Jim Mallory	September 8, 1940	August 25, 1945	Outfielder	Washington Senators, St. Louis Cardinals, New York Giants	
Sheldon Mallory	April 10, 1977	September 27, 1977	Outfielder	Oakland Athletics	
Alex Malloy	September 10, 1910	October 9, 1910	Pitcher	St. Louis Browns	
Bob Malloy (1940s P)	May 4, 1943	May 6, 1949	Pitcher	Cincinnati Reds, St. Louis Browns	
Bob Malloy (1980s P)	May 26, 1987	June 8, 1990	Pitcher	Texas Rangers, Montreal Expos	
Herm Malloy	October 6, 1907	June 1, 1908	Pitcher	Detroit Tigers	
Marty Malloy	September 6, 1998	June 7, 2002	Second baseman	Atlanta Braves, Florida Marlins	
Harry Malmberg	April 12, 1955	September 11, 1955	Second baseman	Detroit Tigers	
Chuck Malone	September 6, 1990	October 3, 1990	Pitcher	Philadelphia Phillies	
Eddie Malone	July 17, 1949	June 25, 1950	Catcher	Chicago White Sox	
Fergy Malone	May 20, 1871	April 17, 1884	Catcher	Philadelphia Athletics (1860–76), Philadelphia White Stockings, Chicago White Stockings, Philadelphia Keystones	
Lew Malone	May 31, 1915	September 27, 1919	Utility infielder	Philadelphia Athletics, Brooklyn Robins	
Martin Malone	June 20, 1872	September 13, 1872	Pitcher	Eckford of Brooklyn	
Pat Malone	April 12, 1928	September 28, 1937	Pitcher	Chicago Cubs, New York Yankees	
Billy Maloney	May 2, 1901	October 6, 1908	Outfielder	Milwaukee Brewers (1901), St. Louis Browns, Cincinnati Reds, Chicago Cubs, Brooklyn Superbas	
Charlie Maloney	August 10, 1908	August 10, 1908	Pitcher	Boston Doves	
Jim Maloney	July 27, 1960	September 21, 1971	Pitcher	Cincinnati Reds, California Angels	
John Maloney	September 15, 1876	August 28, 1877	Outfielder	New York Mutuals, Hartford Dark Blues	
Matt Maloney	June 6, 2009		Pitcherer	Cincinnati Reds	
Pat Maloney	June 19, 1912	August 5, 1912	Outfielder	New York Highlanders	
Sean Maloney	April 28, 1997	September 26, 1998	Pitcher	Milwaukee Brewers, Los Angeles Dodgers	
Paul Maloy	July 11, 1913	July 22, 1913	Pitcher	Boston Red Sox	
Gordon Maltzberger	April 27, 1943	September 17, 1947	Pitcher	Chicago White Sox	
Frank Malzone	September 17, 1955	October 1, 1966	Third baseman	Boston Red Sox, California Angels	
Al Mamaux	September 23, 1913	September 2, 1924	Pitcher	Pittsburgh Pirates, Brooklyn Robins, New York Yankees	
Frank Mancuso	April 18, 1944	September 26, 1947	Catcher	St. Louis Browns, Washington Senators	
Gus Mancuso	April 30, 1928	September 11, 1945	Catcher	St. Louis Cardinals, New York Giants, Chicago Cubs, Brooklyn Dodgers, Philadelphia Phillies	
Carl Manda	September 11, 1914	September 22, 1914	Second baseman	Chicago White Sox	
Hal Manders	August 12, 1941	September 24, 1946	Pitcher	Detroit Tigers, Chicago Cubs	
Vincent Maney	May 18, 1912	May 18, 1912	Shortstop	Detroit Tigers	
Jim Mangan	April 16, 1952	August 2, 1956	Catcher	Pittsburgh Pirates, New York Giants	
Matt Mangini	September 23, 2010		Third baseman	Seattle Mariners	
Ángel Mangual	September 15, 1969	June 20, 1976	Outfielder	Pittsburgh Pirates, Oakland Athletics	
Pepe Mangual	September 6, 1972	October 2, 1977	Outfielder	Montreal Expos, New York Mets	
Leo Mangum	July 11, 1924	May 11, 1935	Pitcher	Chicago White Sox, New York Giants, Boston Braves	
George Mangus	August 20, 1912	September 20, 1912	Outfielder	Philadelphia Phillies	
Clyde Manion	May 5, 1920	September 30, 1934	Catcher	Detroit Tigers, St. Louis Browns, Cincinnati Reds	
Phil Mankowski	August 30, 1976	July 21, 1982	Third baseman	Detroit Tigers, New York Mets	
Charlie Manlove	May 31, 1884	June 17, 1884	Catcher	Altoona Mountain City, New York Gothams	
Fred Mann	May 1, 1882	October 10, 1887	Outfielder	Worcester Ruby Legs, Philadelphia Athletics (AA), Columbus Buckeyes, Pittsburgh Alleghenys, Cleveland Blues	
Garth Mann	May 14, 1944	May 14, 1944	Pinch runner	Chicago Cubs	
Jim Mann	May 29, 2000	August 1, 2003	Pitcher	New York Mets, Houston Astros, Pittsburgh Pirates	
Johnny Mann	April 18, 1928	May 23, 1928	Third baseman	Chicago White Sox	
Kelly Mann	September 4, 1989	October 3, 1990	Catcher	Atlanta Braves	
Les Mann	April 30, 1913	September 30, 1928	Outfielder	Boston Braves, Chicago Whales, Chicago Cubs, St. Louis Cardinals, Cincinnati Reds, New York Giants	
Charlie Manning	May 24, 2008		Pitcher	Washington Nationals	
David Manning	August 2, 2003	August 9, 2003	Pitcher	Milwaukee Brewers	
Ernie Manning	May 3, 1914	June 14, 1914	Pitcher	St. Louis Browns	
Jack Manning	April 23, 1873	October 14, 1886	Pitcher	Boston Red Stockings, Baltimore Canaries, Hartford Dark Blues, Boston Red Caps, Cincinnati Reds (1876–1880), Buffalo Bisons (NL), Philadelphia Quakers, Baltimore Orioles (AA)	
Jim Manning (OF/2B)	May 16, 1884	October 13, 1889	Outfielder/infielder	Boston Beaneaters, Detroit Wolverines, Kansas City Cowboys (AA)	
Jim Manning (P)	April 15, 1962	May 2, 1962	Pitcher	Minnesota Twins	
Rick Manning	May 23, 1975	October 4, 1987	Outfielder	Cleveland Indians, Milwaukee Brewers	
Rube Manning	September 25, 1907	August 22, 1910	Pitcher	New York Highlanders	
Tim Manning	May 1, 1882	July 20, 1885	Second baseman	Providence Grays, Baltimore Orioles (AA)	
Don Manno	September 22, 1940	July 10, 1941	Outfielder	Boston Braves	
Julio Mañón	June 5, 2003	October 1, 2006	Pitcher	Montreal Expos, Baltimore Orioles	
Ramón Mañón	April 19, 2001	April 19, 2001	Pitcher	Texas Rangers	
Fred Manrique	August 23, 1981	May 11, 1991	Second baseman	Toronto Blue Jays, Montreal Expos, St. Louis Cardinals, Chicago White Sox, Texas Rangers, Minnesota Twins, Oakland Athletics	
John Mansell	May 9, 1882	July 22, 1882	Outfielder	Philadelphia Athletics (AA)	
Mike Mansell	May 1, 1879	October 15, 1884	Outfielder	Syracuse Stars (NL), Cincinnati Reds (1876–1880), Pittsburgh Alleghenys, Philadelphia Athletics (AA), Richmond Virginians	
Tom Mansell	May 1, 1879	October 15, 1884	Outfielder	Troy Trojans, Syracuse Stars (NL), Detroit Wolverines, St. Louis Browns, Cincinnati Red Stockings (AA), Columbus Buckeyes	
Jeff Manship	August 15, 2009		Pitcher	Minnesota Twins	
Lou Manske	August 31, 1906	September 7, 1906	Pitcher	Pittsburgh Pirates	
Matt Mantei	June 18, 1995	July 1, 2005	Pitcher	Florida Marlins, Arizona Diamondbacks, Boston Red Sox	
Félix Mantilla	June 21, 1956	October 2, 1966	Utility player	Milwaukee Braves, New York Mets, Boston Red Sox, Houston Astros	
Mickey Mantle β	April 17, 1951	September 28, 1968	Outfielder	New York Yankees	
Jeff Manto	June 7, 1990	April 20, 2000	Third baseman	Cleveland Indians, Philadelphia Phillies, Baltimore Orioles, Boston Red Sox, Seattle Mariners, Detroit Tigers, New York Yankees, Colorado Rockies	
Barry Manuel	September 6, 1991	August 8, 1998	Pitcher	Texas Rangers, Montreal Expos, New York Mets, Arizona Diamondbacks	
Charlie Manuel	April 8, 1969	September 21, 1975	Outfielder	Minnesota Twins, Los Angeles Dodgers	
Jerry Manuel	September 18, 1975	May 30, 1982	Second baseman	Detroit Tigers, Montreal Expos, San Diego Padres	
Moxie Manuel	September 25, 1905	September 14, 1908	Pitcher	Washington Senators, Chicago White Sox	
Robert Manuel	July 9, 2009		Pitcher	Cincinnati Reds, Boston Red Sox	
Frank Manush	August 31, 1908	October 2, 1908	Third baseman	Philadelphia Athletics	
Heinie Manush β	April 20, 1923	May 22, 1939	Outfielder	Detroit Tigers, St. Louis Browns, Washington Senators, Boston Red Sox, Brooklyn Dodgers, Pittsburgh Pirates	
Dick Manville	April 30, 1950	September 10, 1952	Pitcher	Boston Braves, Chicago Cubs	
Kirt Manwaring	September 15, 1987	October 3, 1999	Catcher	San Francisco Giants, Houston Astros, Colorado Rockies	
Josías Manzanillo	October 5, 1991	September 22, 2004	Pitcher	Boston Red Sox, Milwaukee Brewers, New York Mets, New York Yankees, Seattle Mariners, Pittsburgh Pirates, Cincinnati Reds, Florida Marlins	
Ravelo Manzanillo	September 25, 1988	May 9, 1995	Pitcher	Chicago White Sox, Pittsburgh Pirates	
Tommy Manzella	September 8, 2009		Shortstop	Houston Astros	
Rolla Mapel	August 31, 1919	September 11, 1919	Pitcher	St. Louis Browns	
Cliff Mapes	April 20, 1948	September 28, 1952	Outfielder	New York Yankees, St. Louis Browns, Detroit Tigers	
Howard Maple	May 19, 1932	September 18, 1932	Catcher	Washington Senators	
George Mappes	September 23, 1885	October 9, 1886	Second baseman	Baltimore Orioles (AA), St. Louis Maroons	
Paul Marak	September 1, 1990	October 2, 1990	Pitcher	Atlanta Braves	
Georges Maranda	April 26, 1960	September 10, 1962	Pitcher	San Francisco Giants, Minnesota Twins	
Rabbit Maranville β	September 10, 1912	September 29, 1935	Shortstop	Boston Braves, Pittsburgh Pirates, Chicago Cubs, Brooklyn Robins, St. Louis Cardinals	
Firpo Marberry	August 11, 1923	June 10, 1936	Pitcher	Washington Senators, Detroit Tigers, New York Giants	
Walt Marbet	June 17, 1913	June 25, 1913	Pitcher	St. Louis Cardinals	
Phil Marchildon	September 22, 1940	July 16, 1950	Pitcher	Philadelphia Athletics, Boston Red Sox	
Johnny Marcum	September 7, 1933	September 30, 1939	Pitcher	Philadelphia Athletics, Boston Red Sox, St. Louis Browns, Chicago White Sox	
Shaun Marcum	September 6, 2005		Pitcher	Toronto Blue Jays, Milwaukee Brewers	
Leo Marentette	September 26, 1965	June 15, 1969	Pitcher	Detroit Tigers, Montreal Expos	
Joe Margoneri	April 25, 1956	June 3, 1957	Pitcher	New York Giants	
Juan Marichal β	July 19, 1960	April 16, 1975	Pitcher	San Francisco Giants, Boston Red Sox, Los Angeles Dodgers	
Jhan Mariñez	July 16, 2010		Pitcher	Florida Marlins	
Dan Marion	April 23, 1914	September 30, 1915	Pitcher	Brooklyn Tip-Tops	
Marty Marion	April 16, 1940	July 6, 1953	Shortstop	St. Louis Cardinals, St. Louis Browns	
Red Marion	September 16, 1935	July 22, 1943	Outfielder	Washington Senators	
Roger Maris	April 16, 1957	September 29, 1968	Outfielder	Cleveland Indians, Kansas City Athletics, New York Yankees, St. Louis Cardinals	
Nick Markakis	April 3, 2006		Outfielder	Baltimore Orioles	
Duke Markell	September 6, 1951	September 29, 1951	Pitcher	St. Louis Browns	
Gene Markland	April 25, 1950	May 7, 1950	Second baseman	Philadelphia Athletics	
Cliff Markle	September 18, 1915	July 14, 1924	Pitcher	New York Yankees, Cincinnati Reds	
Dick Marlowe	September 19, 1951	September 30, 1956	Pitcher	Detroit Tigers, Chicago White Sox	
Carlos Mármol	June 4, 2006		Pitcher	Chicago Cubs	
Harry Marnie	September 15, 1940	September 25, 1942	Second baseman	Philadelphia Phillies	
Fred Marolewski	September 19, 1953	September 19, 1953	First baseman	St. Louis Cardinals	
Lou Marone	May 30, 1969	April 18, 1970	Pitcher	Pittsburgh Pirates	
Mike Maroth	June 8, 2002		Pitcher	Detroit Tigers, St. Louis Cardinals	
Rube Marquard β	September 25, 1908	September 18, 1925	Pitcher	New York Giants, Brooklyn Robins, Cincinnati Reds, Boston Braves	
Ollie Marquardt	April 14, 1931	June 8, 1931	Second baseman	Boston Red Sox	
Gonzalo Márquez	August 11, 1972	June 5, 1974	First baseman	Oakland Athletics, Chicago Cubs	
Isidro Márquez	April 26, 1995	May 12, 1995	Pitcher	Chicago White Sox	
Jeff Marquez	July 9, 2010		Pitcher	Chicago White Sox, New York Yankees	
Luis Márquez	April 18, 1951	July 11, 1954	Outfielder	Boston Braves, Chicago Cubs, Pittsburgh Pirates	
Bob Marquis	April 17, 1953	July 7, 1953	Outfielder	Cincinnati Reds	
Jason Marquis	June 6, 2000		Pitcher	Atlanta Braves, St. Louis Cardinals, Chicago Cubs, Colorado Rockies, Washington Nationals, Arizona Diamondbacks	
Jim Marquis	August 8, 1925	August 11, 1925	Pitcher	New York Yankees	
Roger Marquis	September 25, 1955	September 25, 1955	Outfielder	Baltimore Orioles	
Lefty Marr	October 3, 1886	August 16, 1891	Outfielder	Cincinnati Red Stockings (AA), Columbus Solons, Cincinnati Reds, Cincinnati Kelly's Killers	
Chris Marrero	August 27, 2011		First baseman	Washington Nationals	
Connie Marrero	April 21, 1950	September 7, 1954	Pitcher	Washington Senators	
Eli Marrero	September 3, 1997	August 8, 2006	Utility player	St. Louis Cardinals, Atlanta Braves, Kansas City Royals, Baltimore Orioles, Colorado Rockies, New York Mets	
Oreste Marrero	April 12, 1993	September 26, 1996	First baseman	Montreal Expos, Los Angeles Dodgers	
William Marriott	September 6, 1917	April 28, 1927	Third baseman	Chicago Cubs, Boston Braves, Brooklyn Robins	
Buck Marrow	July 3, 1932	July 4, 1938	Pitchers	Detroit Tigers, Brooklyn Dodgers	
Ed Mars	August 12, 1890	October 12, 1890	Pitcher	Syracuse Stars (AA)	
Armando Marsans	July 4, 1911	July 13, 1918	Outfielder	Cincinnati Reds, St. Louis Terriers, St. Louis Browns, New York Yankees	
Fred Marsh	April 19, 1949	May 29, 1956	Utility infielder	Cleveland Indians, St. Louis Browns, Washington Senators, Chicago White Sox, Baltimore Orioles	
Tom Marsh	June 5, 1992	September 29, 1995	Outfielder	Philadelphia Phillies	
Bill Marshall	June 20, 1931	September 21, 1934	Second baseman	Boston Red Sox, Cincinnati Reds	
Chip Marshall	June 14, 1941	June 14, 1941	Catcher	St. Louis Cardinals	
Cuddles Marshall	April 24, 1946	September 30, 1950	Pitcher	New York Yankees, St. Louis Browns	
Dave Marshall	September 7, 1967	June 22, 1973	Outfielder	San Francisco Giants, New York Mets, San Diego Padres	
Doc Marshall (C)	April 15, 1904	October 7, 1909	Catcher	Philadelphia Phillies, New York Giants, Boston Beaneaters, St. Louis Cardinals, Chicago Cubs, Brooklyn Superbas	
Doc Marshall (IF)	September 28, 1929	September 3, 1932	Shortstop	New York Giants	
Jay Marshall	April 2, 2007		Pitcher	Oakland Athletics	
Jim Marshall	April 15, 1958	September 28, 1962	First baseman	Baltimore Orioles, Chicago Cubs, San Francisco Giants, New York Mets, Pittsburgh Pirates	
Joe Marshall	September 7, 1903	August 17, 1906	Outfielder	Pittsburgh Pirates, St. Louis Cardinals	
Keith Marshall	April 7, 1973	April 24, 1973	Outfielder	Kansas City Royals	
Max Marshall	May 10, 1942	July 26, 1944	Outfielder	Cincinnati Reds	
Mike Marshall (P)	May 31, 1967	October 2, 1981	Pitcher	Detroit Tigers, Seattle Pilots, Houston Astros, Montreal Expos, Los Angeles Dodgers, Atlanta Braves, Texas Rangers, Minnesota Twins, New York Mets	
Mike Marshall (OF)	September 7, 1981	August 4, 1991	Outfielder	Los Angeles Dodgers, New York Mets, Boston Red Sox, California Angels	
Rube Marshall	September 28, 1912	September 26, 1915	Pitcher	Philadelphia Phillies, Buffalo Blues	
Sean Marshall	April 9, 2006		Pitcher	Chicago Cubs	
Willard Marshall	April 14, 1942	June 15, 1955	Outfielder	New York Giants, Boston Braves, Cincinnati Reds, Chicago White Sox	
Lou Marson	September 28, 2008		Catcher	Philadelphia Phillies, Cleveland Indians	
Sam Marsonek	July 11, 2004	July 11, 2004	Pitcher	New York Yankees	
Andy Marte	June 7, 2005		Third baseman	Atlanta Braves, Cleveland Indians	
Dámaso Marte	June 30, 1999		Pitcher	Seattle Mariners, Pittsburgh Pirates, Chicago White Sox, New York Yankees	
Luis Marte	September 1, 2011		Pitcher	Detroit Tigers	
Víctor Marte	September 6, 2009		Pitcher	Kansas City Royals	
Doc Martel	July 6, 1909	June 18, 1910	Utility player	Philadelphia Phillies, Boston Doves	
Al Martin (2B)	May 7, 1872	September 25, 1875	Second baseman	Eckford of Brooklyn, Brooklyn Atlantics	
Al Martin (OF)	July 28, 1992	September 21, 2003	Outfielder	Pittsburgh Pirates, San Diego Padres, Seattle Mariners, Tampa Bay Devil Rays	
Babe Martin	September 25, 1944	July 1, 1953	Outfielder	St. Louis Browns, Boston Red Sox	
Barney Martin	April 22, 1953	April 22, 1953	Pitcher	Cincinnati Reds	
Billy Martin (SS)	October 6, 1914	October 6, 1914	Shortstop	Boston Braves	
Billy Martin (2B)	April 18, 1950	October 1, 1961	Second baseman	New York Yankees, Kansas City Athletics, Detroit Tigers, Cleveland Indians, Cincinnati Reds, Milwaukee Braves, Minnesota Twins	
Doc Martin	October 7, 1908	June 5, 1912	Pitcher	Philadelphia Athletics	
Frank Martin	June 30, 1897	September 25, 1899	Third baseman	Louisville Colonels, Chicago Orphans, New York Giants	
Fred Martin	April 21, 1946	September 24, 1950	Pitcher	St. Louis Cardinals	
Gene Martin	July 28, 1968	September 13, 1968	Outfielder	Washington Senators (1961–1971)	
Hersh Martin	April 23, 1937	September 23, 1945	Outfielder	Philadelphia Phillies, New York Yankees	
Jack Martin	April 25, 1912	October 6, 1914	Shortstop	New York Highlanders, Boston Braves, Philadelphia Phillies	
J. C. Martin	September 10, 1959	August 12, 1972	Catcher	Chicago White Sox, New York Mets, Chicago Cubs	
J. D. Martin	July 20, 2009		Pitcher	Washington Nationals	
Jerry Martin	September 7, 1974	September 19, 1984	Outfielder	Philadelphia Phillies, Chicago Cubs, San Francisco Giants, Kansas City Royals, New York Mets	
Joe Martin (OF)	April 28, 1903	August 31, 1903	Outfielder	Washington Senators, St. Louis Browns	
Joe Martin (3B)	April 27, 1936	April 19, 1938	Third baseman	New York Giants, Chicago White Sox	
John Martin	August 27, 1980	October 2, 1983	Pitcher	St. Louis Cardinals, Detroit Tigers	
Leonys Martín	September 2, 2011		Outfielder	Texas Rangers	
Mike Martin	August 15, 1986	September 27, 1986	Catcher	Chicago Cubs	
Morrie Martin	April 25, 1949	April 22, 1959	Pitcher	Brooklyn Dodgers, Philadelphia Athletics, Chicago White Sox, Baltimore Orioles, St. Louis Cardinals, Cleveland Indians, Chicago Cubs	
Norberto Martin	September 20, 1993	May 4, 1999	Second baseman	Chicago White Sox, Anaheim Angels, Toronto Blue Jays	
Pat Martin	September 20, 1919	June 6, 1920	Pitcher	Philadelphia Athletics	
Paul Martin	July 2, 1955	August 16, 1955	Pitcher	Pittsburgh Pirates	
Pepper Martin	April 16, 1928	October 1, 1944	Outfielder	St. Louis Cardinals	
Phonney Martin	April 26, 1872	October 21, 1873	Outfielder	Troy Haymakers, Eckford of Brooklyn, New York Mutuals	
Ray Martin	August 15, 1943	April 25, 1948	Pitcher	Boston Braves	
Renie Martin	May 9, 1979	September 30, 1984	Pitcher	Kansas City Royals, San Francisco Giants, Philadelphia Phillies	
Russell Martin	May 5, 2006		Catcher	Los Angeles Dodgers, New York Yankees	
Speed Martin	July 5, 1917	April 17, 1922	Pitcher	St. Louis Browns, Chicago Cubs	
Stu Martin	April 14, 1936	September 6, 1943	Second baseman	St. Louis Cardinals, Pittsburgh Pirates, Chicago Cubs	
Tom Martin	April 2, 1997	July 19, 2007	Pitcher	Houston Astros, Cleveland Indians, New York Mets, Tampa Bay Devil Rays, Los Angeles Dodgers, Atlanta Braves, Colorado Rockies	
Joe Martina	April 19, 1924	September 30, 1924	Pitcher	Washington Senators	
Alfredo Martínez	April 20, 1980	June 7, 1981	Pitcher	California Angels	
Anastacio Martínez	May 22, 2004	July 2, 2004	Pitcher	Boston Red Sox	
Buck Martinez	June 18, 1969	October 3, 1986	Catcher	Kansas City Royals, Milwaukee Brewers, Toronto Blue Jays	
Carlos Martínez (IF)	September 2, 1988	July 20, 1995	Utility infielder	Chicago White Sox, Cleveland Indians, California Angels	
Carlos Martínez (P)	April 3, 2006		Pitcher	Florida Marlins	
Carmelo Martínez	August 22, 1983	October 2, 1991	Outfielder	Chicago Cubs, San Diego Padres, Philadelphia Phillies, Pittsburgh Pirates, Kansas City Royals, Cincinnati Reds	
Chito Martínez	July 5, 1991	April 20, 1993	Outfielder	Baltimore Orioles	
Cristhian Martínez	May 21, 2009		Pitcher	Florida Marlins, Atlanta Braves	
Dave Martinez	June 15, 1986	October 7, 2001	Outfielder	Chicago Cubs, Montreal Expos, Cincinnati Reds, San Francisco Giants, Chicago White Sox, Tampa Bay Devil Rays, Texas Rangers, Toronto Blue Jays, Atlanta Braves	
Dennis Martínez	September 14, 1976	September 27, 1998	Pitcher	Baltimore Orioles, Montreal Expos, Cleveland Indians, Seattle Mariners, Atlanta Braves	
Domingo Martínez	September 11, 1992	October 3, 1993	First baseman	Toronto Blue Jays	
Edgar Martínez	September 12, 1987	October 3, 2004	Designated hitter	Seattle Mariners	
Félix Martínez	September 3, 1997	September 30, 2001	Shortstop	Kansas City Royals, Tampa Bay Devil Rays	
Fernando Martínez	May 26, 2009		Outfielder	New York Mets	
Greg Martinez	March 31, 1998	September 27, 1998	Outfielder	Milwaukee Brewers	
Héctor Martínez	September 30, 1962	June 4, 1963	Outfielder	Kansas City Athletics	
J. D. Martinez	July 30, 2011		Outfielder	Houston Astros	
Javier Martínez	April 2, 1998	September 27, 1998	Pitcher	Pittsburgh Pirates	
Joe Martinez	April 7, 2009		Pitcher	San Francisco Giants, Pittsburgh Pirates	
José Martínez (IF)	June 18, 1969	May 28, 1970	Second baseman	Pittsburgh Pirates	
José Martínez (P)	May 10, 1994	May 19, 1994	Pitcher	San Diego Padres	
Luis Martínez (P)	September 3, 2003	September 28, 2003	Pitcher	Milwaukee Brewers	
Luis Martínez (C)	July 15, 2011		Catcher	Pittsburgh Pirates	
Manny Martínez	June 14, 1996	October 3, 1999	Outfielder	Seattle Mariners, Philadelphia Phillies, Pittsburgh Pirates, Montreal Expos	
Marty Martínez	May 2, 1962	October 4, 1972	Shortstop	Minnesota Twins, Atlanta Braves, Houston Astros, St. Louis Cardinals, Oakland Athletics, Texas Rangers	
Michael Martínez	April 3, 2011		Utility player	Philadelphia Phillies	
Osvaldo Martínez	September 19, 2010		Shortstop	Florida Marlins	
Pablo Martínez	July 20, 1996	August 4, 1996	Shortstop	Atlanta Braves	
Pedro Martínez (RHP)	September 24, 1992		Pitcher	Los Angeles Dodgers, Montreal Expos, Boston Red Sox, New York Mets, Philadelphia Phillies	
Pedro Martínez (LHP)	June 29, 1993	September 6, 1997	Pitcher	San Diego Padres, Houston Astros, New York Mets, Cincinnati Reds	
Ramón Martínez (P)	August 13, 1988	May 1, 2001	Pitcher	Los Angeles Dodgers, Boston Red Sox, Pittsburgh Pirates	
Ramón Martínez (IF)	June 20, 1998		Utility infielder	San Francisco Giants, Chicago Cubs, Detroit Tigers, Philadelphia Phillies, Los Angeles Dodgers, New York Mets	
Rogelio Martínez	July 13, 1950	July 16, 1950	Pitcher	Washington Senators	
Sandy Martínez	June 24, 1995	October 3, 2004	Catcher	Toronto Blue Jays, Chicago Cubs, Florida Marlins, Montreal Expos, Cleveland Indians, Boston Red Sox	
Silvio Martínez	April 9, 1977	October 4, 1981	Pitcher	Chicago White Sox, St. Louis Cardinals	
Ted Martínez	July 18, 1970	September 30, 1979	Utility infielder	New York Mets, St. Louis Cardinals, Oakland Athletics, Los Angeles Dodgers	
Tino Martinez	August 20, 1990	October 2, 2005	First baseman	Seattle Mariners, New York Yankees, St. Louis Cardinals, Tampa Bay Devil Rays	
Tippy Martinez	August 9, 1974	April 18, 1988	Pitcher	New York Yankees, Baltimore Orioles, Minnesota Twins	
Tony Martínez	April 9, 1963	June 14, 1966	Shortstop	Cleveland Indians	
Víctor Martínez	September 10, 2002		Catcher	Cleveland Indians, Boston Red Sox, Detroit Tigers	
Willie Martínez	June 14, 2000	June 14, 2000	Pitcher	Cleveland Indians	
Wedo Martini	July 28, 1935	August 28, 1935	Pitcher	Philadelphia Athletics	
Shairon Martis	September 4, 2008		Pitcher	Washington Nationals	
Joe Marty	April 22, 1937	September 28, 1941	Outfielder	Chicago Cubs, Philadelphia Phillies	
Bob Martyn	June 18, 1957	April 10, 1959	Outfielder	Kansas City Athletics	
Gary Martz	July 8, 1975	July 8, 1975	Outfielder	Kansas City Royals	
Randy Martz	September 6, 1980	August 5, 1983	Pitcher	Chicago Cubs, Chicago White Sox	
John Marzano	July 31, 1987	September 23, 1998	Catcher	Boston Red Sox, Texas Rangers, Seattle Mariners	
Onan Masaoka	April 5, 1999	September 30, 2000	Pitcher	Los Angeles Dodgers	
Clyde Mashore	July 11, 1969	September 30, 1973	Outfielder	Cincinnati Reds, Montreal Expos	
Damon Mashore	June 5, 1996	July 11, 1998	Outfielder	Oakland Athletics, Anaheim Angels	
Phil Masi	April 23, 1939	August 17, 1952	Catcher	Boston Bees/Braves, Pittsburgh Pirates, Chicago White Sox	
Harry Maskrey	September 21, 1882	September 21, 1882	Outfielder	Louisville Eclipse	
Leech Maskrey	May 2, 1882	July 7, 1886	Outfielder	Louisville Eclipse/Colonels, Cincinnati Red Stockings (AA)	
Charlie Mason	April 26, 1875	July 4, 1883	Outfielder	Philadelphia Centennials, Washington Nationals (NA 1875), Philadelphia Athletics (AA)	
Del Mason	April 23, 1904	August 16, 1907	Pitcher	Washington Senators, Cincinnati Reds	
Don Mason	April 14, 1966	May 30, 1973	Second baseman	San Francisco Giants, San Diego Padres	
Ernie Mason	July 17, 1894	August 1, 1894	Pitcher	St. Louis Browns (NL)	
Hank Mason	September 12, 1958	April 24, 1960	Pitcher	Philadelphia Phillies	
Jim Mason	September 25, 1971	September 24, 1979	Shortstop	Washington Senators (1961–1971), Texas Rangers, New York Yankees, Toronto Blue Jays, Montreal Expos	
Mike Mason	September 13, 1982	May 8, 1988	Pitcher	Texas Rangers, Chicago Cubs, Minnesota Twins	
Roger Mason	September 4, 1984	August 11, 1994	Pitcher	Detroit Tigers, San Francisco Giants, Houston Astros, Pittsburgh Pirates, San Diego Padres, Philadelphia Phillies, New York Mets	
Gordon Massa	September 24, 1957	September 9, 1958	Catcher	Chicago Cubs	
Nick Masset	June 27, 2006		Pitcher	Texas Rangers, Chicago White Sox, Cincinnati Reds	
Bill Massey	September 18, 1894	September 30, 1894	First baseman	Cincinnati Reds	
Mike Massey	April 12, 1917	June 30, 1917	Second baseman	Boston Braves	
Red Massey	April 16, 1918	August 3, 1918	Outfielder	Boston Braves	
Dan Masteller	June 23, 1995	October 1, 1995	First baseman	Minnesota Twins	
Walt Masters	July 9, 1931	August 25, 1939	Pitcher	Washington Senators, Philadelphia Phillies, Philadelphia Athletics	
Justin Masterson	April 24, 2008		Pitcher	Boston Red Sox, Cleveland Indians	
Paul Masterson	September 15, 1940	May 3, 1942	Pitcher	Philadelphia Phillies	
Walt Masterson	May 8, 1939	September 24, 1956	Pitcher	Washington Senators, Boston Red Sox, Detroit Tigers	
Tom Mastny	July 30, 2006		Pitcher	Cleveland Indians	
Darin Mastroianni	August 24, 2011		Outfielder	Toronto Blue Jays	
Frank Mata	May 26, 2010		Pitcher	Baltimore Orioles	
Víctor Mata	July 22, 1984	June 11, 1985	Outfielder	New York Yankees	
Len Matarazzo	September 6, 1952	September 6, 1952	Pitcher	Philadelphia Athletics	
Tom Matchick	September 2, 1967	October 3, 1972	Utility infielder	Detroit Tigers, Boston Red Sox, Kansas City Royals, Milwaukee Brewers, Baltimore Orioles	
Henry Mateo	July 28, 2001	October 1, 2006	Second baseman	Montreal Expos, Washington Nationals	
Juan Mateo	August 3, 2006	September 30, 2006	Pitcher	Chicago Cubs	
Julio Mateo	May 7, 2002		Pitcher	Seattle Mariners	
Marcos Mateo	August 9, 2010		Pitcher	Chicago Cubs	
Rubén Mateo	June 12, 1999	August 21, 2004	Outfielder	Texas Rangers, Cincinnati Reds, Pittsburgh Pirates, Kansas City Royals	
Mike Matheny	April 7, 1994	May 31, 2006	Catcher	Milwaukee Brewers, Toronto Blue Jays, St. Louis Cardinals, San Francisco Giants	
Joe Mather	May 30, 2008		Outfielder	St. Louis Cardinals, Atlanta Braves	
Joe Mathes	September 19, 1912	September 9, 1916	Second baseman	Philadelphia Athletics, St. Louis Terriers, Boston Braves	
Bobby Mathews	May 4, 1871	October 10, 1887	Pitcher	Fort Wayne Kekiongas, Baltimore Canaries, New York Mutuals, Cincinnati Reds (1876–1880), Providence Grays, Boston Red Caps, Philadelphia Athletics (AA)	
Eddie Mathews β	April 15, 1952	September 27, 1968	Third baseman	Boston/Milwaukee/Atlanta Braves, Houston Astros, Detroit Tigers	
Greg Mathews	June 3, 1986	October 3, 1992	Pitcher	St. Louis Cardinals, Philadelphia Phillies	
Nelson Mathews	September 9, 1960	July 18, 1965	Outfielder	Chicago Cubs, Kansas City Athletics	
T. J. Mathews	July 28, 1995	July 24, 2002	Pitcher	St. Louis Cardinals, Oakland Athletics, Houston Astros	
Terry Mathews	June 21, 1991	August 11, 1999	Pitcher	Texas Rangers, Florida Marlins, Baltimore Orioles, Kansas City Royals	
Christy Mathewson β	July 17, 1900	September 4, 1916	Pitcher	New York Giants, Cincinnati Reds	
Henry Mathewson	September 28, 1906	May 4, 1907	Pitcher	New York Giants	
Carl Mathias	July 31, 1960	July 14, 1961	Pitcher	Cleveland Indians, Washington Senators (1961–1971)	
Scott Mathieson	June 17, 2006		Pitcher	Philadelphia Phillies	
Doug Mathis	May 12, 2008		Pitcher	Texas Rangers	
Jeff Mathis	August 12, 2005		Catcher	Los Angeles Angels of Anaheim	
Ron Mathis	April 13, 1985	July 4, 1987	Pitcher	Houston Astros	
Jimmy Mathison	August 29, 1902	September 29, 1902	Third baseman	Baltimore Orioles (1901–02)	
John Matias	April 7, 1970	October 1, 1970	Utility player	Chicago White Sox	
Jon Matlack	July 11, 1971	September 15, 1983	Pitcher	New York Mets, Texas Rangers	
Francisco Matos	July 17, 1994	August 4, 1994	Second baseman	Oakland Athletics	
Julius Matos	May 31, 2002	September 28, 2003	Second baseman	San Diego Padres, Kansas City Royals	
Luis Matos	June 19, 2000	August 9, 2006	Outfielder	Baltimore Orioles, Washington Nationals	
Osiris Matos	July 3, 2008		Pitcher	San Francisco Giants	
Pascual Matos	May 11, 1999	August 9, 1999	Catcher	Atlanta Braves	
Dave Matranga	June 27, 2003	May 8, 2005	Second baseman	Houston Astros, Los Angeles Angels of Anaheim	
Hideki Matsui	March 31, 2003		Outfielder	New York Yankees, Los Angeles Angels of Anaheim, Oakland Athletics	
Kazuo Matsui	April 6, 2004		Second baseman	New York Mets, Colorado Rockies, Houston Astros	
Daisuke Matsuzaka	April 5, 2007		Pitcher	Boston Red Sox	
Al Mattern	September 16, 1908	April 19, 1912	Pitcher	Boston Doves/Rustlers/Braves	
Troy Mattes	June 19, 2001	July 27, 2001	Pitcher	Montreal Expos	
C. V. Matteson	June 13, 1884	June 13, 1884	Pitcher	St. Louis Maroons	
Eddie Matteson	May 30, 1914	September 1, 1918	Pitcher	Philadelphia Phillies, Washington Senators	
Ryan Mattheus	June 14, 2011		Pitcher	Washington Nationals	
Charles Matthews	September 25, 1891	September 25, 1891	Outfielder	Philadelphia Athletics (AA 1891)	
Gary Matthews	September 6, 1972	October 2, 1987	Outfielder	San Francisco Giants, Atlanta Braves, Philadelphia Phillies, Chicago Cubs, Seattle Mariners	
Gary Matthews Jr.	June 4, 1999		Outfielder	San Diego Padres, Chicago Cubs, Pittsburgh Pirates, New York Mets, Baltimore Orioles, Texas Rangers, Los Angeles Angels of Anaheim	
Joe Matthews	September 18, 1922	September 22, 1922	Pitcher	Boston Braves	
Mike Matthews	May 31, 2000	April 24, 2005	Pitcher	St. Louis Cardinals, Milwaukee Brewers, San Diego Padres, Cincinnati Reds, New York Mets	
Wid Matthews	April 18, 1923	June 7, 1925	Outfielder	Philadelphia Athletics, Washington Senators	
William Matthews	August 28, 1909	September 23, 1909	Pitcher	Boston Red Sox	
Dale Matthewson	July 3, 1943	July 30, 1944	Pitcher	Philadelphia Athletics	
Steve Matthias	April 20, 1884	June 27, 1884	Shortstop	Chicago Browns/Pittsburgh Stogies	
Bobby Mattick	May 5, 1938	August 18, 1942	Shortstop	Chicago Cubs, Cincinnati Reds	
Wally Mattick	April 11, 1912	July 21, 1918	Outfielder	Chicago White Sox, St. Louis Cardinals	
Mike Mattimore	May 3, 1887	July 21, 1890	Pitcher	New York Giants, Philadelphia Athletics (AA), Kansas City Cowboys (AA), Brooklyn Gladiators	
Don Mattingly	September 8, 1982	October 1, 1995	First baseman	New York Yankees	
Earl Mattingly	April 15, 1931	June 9, 1931	Pitcher	Brooklyn Robins	
Ralph Mattis	April 22, 1914	October 9, 1914	Outfielder	Pittsburgh Rebels	
Cloy Mattox	September 1, 1929	September 21, 1929	Catcher	Philadelphia Athletics	
Jim Mattox	April 30, 1922	September 30, 1923	Catcher	Pittsburgh Pirates	
Rick Matula	April 8, 1979	June 11, 1981	Pitcher	Atlanta Braves	
Brian Matusz	August 4, 2009		Pitcher	Baltimore Orioles	
Len Matuszek	September 3, 1981	April 30, 1987	First baseman	Philadelphia Phillies, Toronto Blue Jays, Los Angeles Dodgers	
Harry Matuzak	April 19, 1934	May 2, 1936	Pitcher	Philadelphia Athletics	
Gene Mauch	April 18, 1944	September 28, 1957	Second baseman	Brooklyn Dodgers, Pittsburgh Pirates, Chicago Cubs, Boston Braves, St. Louis Cardinals, Boston Red Sox	
Hal Mauck	April 29, 1893	August 10, 1893	Pitcher	Chicago Colts	
Joe Mauer	April 5, 2004		Catcher	Minnesota Twins	
Al Maul	June 20, 1884	September 9, 1901	Pitcher	Philadelphia Keystones, Philadelphia Quakers, Pittsburgh Alleghenys, Pittsburgh Burghers, Pittsburgh Pirates, Washington Senators (1891–99), Baltimore Orioles (NL), Brooklyn Superbas, Philadelphia Phillies, New York Giants	
Mark Mauldin	September 10, 1934	September 30, 1934	Third baseman	Chicago White Sox	
Ernie Maun	May 16, 1924	June 11, 1926	Pitcher	New York Giants, Philadelphia Phillies	
Dick Mauney	June 13, 1945	June 22, 1947	Pitcher	Philadelphia Phillies	
Harry Maupin	October 5, 1898	July 1, 1899	Pitcher	St. Louis Browns (NL), Cleveland Spiders	
Dave Maurer	July 22, 2000	August 28, 2004	Pitcher	San Diego Padres, Cleveland Indians, Toronto Blue Jays	
Rob Maurer	September 8, 1991	October 4, 1992	First baseman	Texas Rangers	
Ralph Mauriello	September 13, 1958	September 27, 1958	Pitcher	Los Angeles Dodgers	
Carmen Mauro	October 1, 1948	September 27, 1953	Outfielder	Chicago Cubs, Brooklyn Dodgers, Washington Senators, Philadelphia Athletics	
Tim Mauser	July 7, 1991	May 5, 1995	Pitcher	Philadelphia Phillies, San Diego Padres	
Bob Mavis	September 17, 1949	September 17, 1949	Pinch runner	Detroit Tigers	
Brian Maxcy	May 26, 1995	April 25, 1996	Pitcher	Detroit Tigers	
Larry Maxie	August 30, 1969	August 31, 1969	Pitcher	Atlanta Braves	
Dal Maxvill	June 10, 1962	September 28, 1975	Shortstop	St. Louis Cardinals, Oakland Athletics, Pittsburgh Pirates	
Bert Maxwell	September 12, 1906	September 14, 1914	Pitcher	Pittsburgh Pirates, Philadelphia Athletics, New York Giants, Brooklyn Tip-Tops	
Charlie Maxwell	September 20, 1950	April 26, 1964	Outfielder	Boston Red Sox, Baltimore Orioles, Detroit Tigers, Chicago White Sox	
Jason Maxwell	September 1, 1998	October 7, 2001	Utility infielder	Chicago Cubs, Minnesota Twins	
Justin Maxwell	September 5, 2007		Outfielder	Washington Nationals	
Buckshot May	May 9, 1924	May 9, 1924	Pitcher	Pittsburgh Pirates	
Carlos May	September 6, 1968	October 2, 1977	Outfielder	Chicago White Sox, New York Yankees, California Angels	
Darrell May	September 10, 1995	July 15, 2005	Pitcher	Atlanta Braves, Pittsburgh Pirates, California/Anaheim Angels, Kansas City Royals, San Diego Padres, New York Yankees	
Dave May	July 28, 1967	October 1, 1978	Outfielder	Baltimore Orioles, Milwaukee Brewers, Atlanta Braves, Texas Rangers, Pittsburgh Pirates	
Derrick May	September 6, 1990	October 3, 1999	Outfielder	Chicago Cubs, Milwaukee Brewers, Houston Astros, Philadelphia Phillies, Montreal Expos, Baltimore Orioles	
Jakie May	June 26, 1917	September 25, 1932	Pitcher	St. Louis Cardinals, Cincinnati Reds, Chicago Cubs	
Jerry May	September 19, 1964	June 3, 1973	Catcher	Pittsburgh Pirates, Kansas City Royals, New York Mets	
Lee May	September 1, 1965	September 24, 1982	First baseman	Cincinnati Reds, Houston Astros, Baltimore Orioles, Kansas City Royals	
Lucas May	September 4, 2010		Catcher	Kansas City Royals	
Milt May	September 8, 1970	September 30, 1984	Catcher	Pittsburgh Pirates, Houston Astros, Detroit Tigers, Chicago White Sox, San Francisco Giants	
Pinky May	April 21, 1939	October 3, 1943	Third baseman	Philadelphia Phillies	
Rudy May	April 18, 1965	September 21, 1983	Pitcher	California Angels, New York Yankees, Baltimore Orioles, Montreal Expos	
Scott May	September 2, 1988	August 25, 1991	Pitcher	Texas Rangers, Chicago Cubs	
Yunesky Maya	September 7, 2010		Pitcher	Washington Nationals	
John Mayberry	September 10, 1968	September 28, 1982	First baseman	Houston Astros, Kansas City Royals, Toronto Blue Jays, New York Yankees	
John Mayberry Jr.	May 23, 2009		Outfielder	Philadelphia Phillies	
Cameron Maybin	August 17, 2007		Outfielder	Detroit Tigers, Florida Marlins, San Diego Padres	
Lee Maye	July 17, 1959	June 29, 1971	Outfielder	Milwaukee Braves, Houston Astros, Cleveland Indians, Washington Senators (1961–1971), Chicago White Sox	
Ed Mayer (3B)	April 19, 1890	September 30, 1891	Third baseman	Philadelphia Phillies	
Ed Mayer (P)	September 15, 1957	June 5, 1958	Pitcher	Chicago Cubs	
Erskine Mayer	September 4, 1912	September 27, 1919	Pitcher	Philadelphia Phillies, Pittsburgh Pirates, Chicago White Sox	
Sam Mayer	September 7, 1915	September 29, 1915	Outfielder	Washington Senators	
Wally Mayer	September 28, 1911	September 2, 1919	Catcher	Chicago White Sox, Boston Red Sox, St. Louis Browns	
Paddy Mayes	June 11, 1911	June 18, 1911	Outfielder	Philadelphia Phillies	
Buster Maynard	September 17, 1940	April 26, 1946	Outfielder	New York Giants	
Chick Maynard	June 27, 1922	July 8, 1922	Shortstop	Boston Red Sox	
Brent Mayne	September 18, 1990	October 2, 2004	Catcher	Kansas City Royals, New York Mets, Oakland Athletics, San Francisco Giants, Colorado Rockies, Arizona Diamondbacks, Los Angeles Dodgers	
Eddie Mayo	May 22, 1936	October 3, 1948	Infielder	New York Giants, Boston Bees, Philadelphia Athletics, Detroit Tigers	
Jackie Mayo	September 19, 1948	September 27, 1953	Outfielder	Philadelphia Phillies	
Al Mays	May 10, 1885	May 2, 1890	Pitcher	Louisville Colonels, New York Metropolitans, Brooklyn Bridegrooms, Columbus Solons	
Carl Mays	April 15, 1915	September 24, 1929	Pitcher	Boston Red Sox, New York Yankees, Cincinnati Reds, New York Giants	
Joe Mays	April 7, 1999	July 22, 2006	Pitcher	Minnesota Twins, Kansas City Royals, Cincinnati Reds	
Willie Mays β	May 25, 1951	September 9, 1973	Center fielder	New York Giants, San Francisco Giants, New York Mets	
Matt Maysey	July 8, 1992	September 28, 1993	Pitcher	Montreal Expos, Milwaukee Brewers	
Edwin Maysonet	September 7, 2008		Infielder	Houston Astros	
Luis Maza	May 14, 2008		Second baseman	Los Angeles Dodgers	
Bill Mazeroski β	July 7, 1956	October 4, 1972	Second baseman	Pittsburgh Pirates	
Vin Mazzaro	June 2, 2009		Pitcher	Oakland Athletics, Kansas City Royals	
Mel Mazzera	September 9, 1935	September 29, 1940	Outfielder	St. Louis Browns, Philadelphia Phillies	
Lee Mazzilli	September 7, 1976	September 29, 1989	Center fielder	New York Mets, Texas Rangers, New York Yankees, Pittsburgh Pirates, Toronto Blue Jays	
