= Ziggy Sears =

American baseball umpire (1892–1956)

- Born: John William Sears; January 10, 1892; Central City, Kentucky, U.S.
- Died: December 16, 1956 (aged 64); Houston, Texas, U.S.
- Occupation: Umpire
- Years active: 1934–1945
- Employer: National League

John William "Ziggy" Sears (January 10, 1892 – December 16, 1956) was an American professional baseball umpire who worked in the National League from 1934 to 1945. Sears umpired 1,647 major league games in his 12-year career. He umpired in two World Series (1938 and 1944) and two All-Star Games (1935 and 1944). He also was a minor league baseball outfielder for 15 seasons between 1912 and 1928.

== Playing career ==
Sears entered organized baseball in Owensboro, Kentucky in 1913. He played minor league baseball for Fort Worth of the Texas League between 1918 and 1927. The Fort Worth team, nicknamed the "Atz Cats" after manager Jake Atz, won six consecutive Texas League championships between 1920 and 1925. Sears acquired his nickname from Atz, as the manager told him that no "John" would ever play on his team. A player named Ziggy Shears had recently been released from the team, and that nickname stuck. Sears had 11 runs batted in during a single game with Fort Worth, which set a modern baseball record, broken on September 16, 1924, by Jim Bottomley of the St. Louis Cardinals. Sears scored five runs in one game several times with Fort Worth. He also had a streak of 81 games without committing an error. Sears also played for minor league teams in Shreveport, San Antonio and Waco.

== Officiating career ==
After Sears retired as a player in the Texas League, he became an umpire in that circuit. He was initially assigned to partner with Harry Kane, who had ejected Sears as a player more often than all other Texas League umpires combined. Sears was promoted to the National League in the summer of 1934. When he was selected to work the 1935 MLB All-Star Game, Sears became the first umpire with less than a year of MLB experience to receive that honor. Sears umpired in the World Series in 1938 and 1944. He would have also worked the 1943 World Series, but he missed it due to illness. Sears broke his foot while umpiring on the last day of the 1945 regular season, and he retired from major league umpiring.

In addition to his service as a baseball umpire, Sears officiated college football and basketball for the Southwest Conference.

== Later life ==
After leaving the National League in 1945, Sears spent time umpiring in the Pacific Coast League. In a 1951 Texas League exhibition game between Milwaukee and Dallas, Sears was struck in the eye by a thrown ball. The injury forced him to quit umpiring. In 1953, Sears sued the Dallas club for negligence. He asserted that the club allowed the game to continue in rainy conditions and that the team did not provide medical care once he was injured.

Sears lived in Houston, Texas for the last several years of his life, and he worked as a scout for the Pittsburgh Pirates. He died of a heart attack in a Houston hospital on December 16, 1956. He was 64.

== Personal life ==
Ziggy's son, Ken Sears, played baseball and football for a year at the University of Alabama before signing a baseball contract with the New York Yankees organization. Ken, sometimes referred to as "Little Ziggy", appeared in the 1943 World Series. His father was scheduled to umpire that series, but had to withdraw due to illness.

== Movie credits ==
Sears had acting roles in two movies, The Stratton Story (1948) and The Babe Ruth Story (1949). He portrayed umpires in both films.

== See also ==
- List of Major League Baseball umpires (disambiguation)
