= List of Major League Baseball players (M) =

The following is a list of Major League Baseball players, retired or active. As of the end of the 2011 season, there have been 1,859 players with a last name that begins with M who have been on a major league roster at one point.

For reasons of space, this list has been split into three pages:

- Duke Maas through Lee Mazzilli
- Jack McAdams through Lou Meyers
- Bart Miadich through Brian Myrow
