= 1938 World Series =

1938 Major League Baseball championship series

Team (Wins)	Managers	Season
New York Yankees (4)	Joe McCarthy	99–53, .651, GA: 9 1/2
Chicago Cubs (0)	Gabby Hartnett (player/manager)	89–63, .586, GA: 2
- Dates: October 5–9
- Venue(s): Wrigley Field (Chicago); Yankee Stadium (New York)
- Umpires: Charley Moran (NL), Cal Hubbard (AL); Ziggy Sears (NL), Lou Kolls (AL)
- Hall of Famers: Umpire: Cal Hubbard; Yankees: Joe McCarthy (manager); Bill Dickey; Joe DiMaggio; Lou Gehrig; Lefty Gomez; Joe Gordon; Red Ruffing; Cubs: Dizzy Dean; Gabby Hartnett; Billy Herman; Tony Lazzeri

Broadcast
- Radio: NBC (Red and Blue); CBS; Mutual
- Radio announcers: NBC Red: Red Barber; Tom Manning; George Hicks; NBC Blue: Johnny O'Hara; George Higgins; Rosey Rowswell; CBS: John Harrington; Pat Flanagan; France Laux; Bill Dyer; Mel Allen; Mutual: Bob Elson; Quin Ryan; David Driscoll; Stan Lomax

The 1938 World Series was the championship series in Major League Baseball for the 1938 season. The 35th edition of the World Series, it matched the two-time defending champion New York Yankees against the Chicago Cubs. The Yankees swept the Series in four games for their seventh championship overall and record third straight (they would win four in a row from 1936 to 1939, and five in a row later from 1949 to 1953).

Dizzy Dean, who had helped carry the Cubs to the National League pennant despite a sore arm, ran out of gas in the Series as the Yanks crushed the Cubs again, as they had in 1932. Yankee starting pitcher Red Ruffing won two games, although he allowed 17 hits in 18 innings pitched. After Game 2 of the Series, the Bronx Bombers would not return to Wrigley Field for nearly 65 years until a three-game interleague series with the Cubs beginning June 6, 2003.

This was the first World Series played at Wrigley Field following the bleacher reconstruction of 1937, which had significantly shortened the left-center field power alley.

== Summary ==
AL New York Yankees (4) vs. NL Chicago Cubs (0)

Game	Date	Score	Location	Time	Attendance
1	October 5	New York Yankees – 3, Chicago Cubs – 1	Wrigley Field	1:53	43,642
2	October 6	New York Yankees – 6, Chicago Cubs – 3	Wrigley Field	1:53	42,108
3	October 8	Chicago Cubs – 2, New York Yankees – 5	Yankee Stadium	1:57	55,236
4	October 9	Chicago Cubs – 3, New York Yankees – 8	Yankee Stadium	2:11	59,847

== Matchups ==
=== Game 1 ===
Wednesday, October 5, 1938 1:30 pm (CT) at Wrigley Field in Chicago, Illinois
Team	1	2	3	4	5	6	7	8	9	R	H	E
New York	0	2	0	0	0	1	0	0	0	3	12	1
Chicago	0	0	1	0	0	0	0	0	0	1	9	1
WP: Red Ruffing (1–0) LP: Bill Lee (0–1)

Game 1 of the Series matched the Yankees' Red Ruffing, who had won 21 games during the season, against the Cubs' 22-game winner Bill Lee. In the top of the second inning, Lou Gehrig walked and moved to third on a single by Bill Dickey. George Selkirk then reached on an error by Cub second baseman Billy Herman scoring Gehrig, and Joe Gordon drove Dickey in with a single for a 2–0 Bomber lead.

In the bottom of the third, the Cubs cut the lead in half when Ripper Collins singled to lead off and moved to second on a groundout by Lee. Stan Hack's single to right scored Collins, Hack taking second on the throw home. But when he attempted to score on an infield single by Herman, he was gunned down at home. The top of the sixth saw New York extend its lead to 3–1 when Tommy Henrich belted a double to right and scored on a Dickey single. The Cubs could muster nothing further off Ruffing, who scattered nine hits over the course of the game, and the Yankees held on for the win and a 1–0 lead in the Series.

=== Game 2 ===
Thursday, October 6, 1938 1:30 pm (CT) at Wrigley Field in Chicago, Illinois
Team	1	2	3	4	5	6	7	8	9	R	H	E
New York	0	2	0	0	0	0	0	2	2	6	7	2
Chicago	1	0	2	0	0	0	0	0	0	3	11	0
WP: Lefty Gomez (1–0) LP: Dizzy Dean (0–1) Sv: Johnny Murphy (1); Home runs: NYY: Frankie Crosetti (1), Joe DiMaggio (1); CHC: None

Game 2 pitted the Yankees' Lefty Gomez against former St. Louis Cardinals ace Dizzy Dean, who had been traded to Chicago in April and won seven of his eight regular-season wins for his new team on finesse after having lost his fastball by changing his pitching motion to avoid putting weight on the toe he had fractured during the 1937 All-Star Game (on a low line drive back to the mound by Earl Averill). Game 2 of the 1938 Series thus became known as "Ol' Diz's Last Stand".

The Cubs gave Dean a 1–0 lead in the bottom of the first inning when Hack singled, advanced to third on a single by Frank Demaree and scored on Joe Marty's fly ball. But the Bronx Bombers took the lead in the next half-inning when a Gordon double scored both Joe DiMaggio and Gehrig. In the bottom of the third, the Cubs went back out in front by a run when Hack and Herman hit back-to-back singles, were sacrificed to third and second by Demaree, and scored on Marty's double.

Dean pitched effectively for the next four innings, giving up only a single to Gehrig in the fourth. But in the top of the eighth, the Yankees stormed back on a two-run homer by Frankie Crosetti that scored pinch-hitter Myril Hoag for a 4–3 Bomber lead, and DiMaggio added a two-run dinger of his own in the top of the ninth that scored Henrich. Johnny Murphy, in relief of Gomez, held Chicago at bay for the final two innings for a 6–3 Yankee win as the Series moved east to New York with a 2–0 Series advantage for the Yankees.

=== Game 3 ===
Saturday, October 8, 1938 1:30 pm (ET) at Yankee Stadium in Bronx, New York
Team	1	2	3	4	5	6	7	8	9	R	H	E
Chicago	0	0	0	0	1	0	0	1	0	2	5	1
New York	0	0	0	0	2	2	0	1	X	5	8	2
WP: Monte Pearson (1–0) LP: Clay Bryant (0–1); Home runs: CHC: Joe Marty (1); NYY: Joe Gordon (1), Bill Dickey (1)

For Game 3 at Yankee Stadium, the Cubs threw Clay Bryant against the Bombers' Monte Pearson. Both pitchers matched zeroes for the first four innings. In the top of the fifth, the Cubs drew first blood when Hack doubled, moved to third on Gordon's error on Phil Cavarretta and scored on Marty's forceout of Cavarretta at second. In the bottom half of the inning, however, Gordon atoned for his mistake by walloping a solo home run off Bryant to tie the game. Pearson followed with a single to right, advanced to second on a Crosetti walk and scored on a Red Rolfe single to give the Yankees a 2–1 lead.

In the bottom of the sixth, New York tacked on two more runs with a two-run single by Gordon. In the top of the eighth, the Cubs cut the lead in half when Marty hit a home run to notch his fifth RBI of the Series, but Dickey answered for the Yankees with a shot of his own in the bottom half. The Bombers held on for a 5–2 win and a 3–0 Series stranglehold.

=== Game 4 ===
Sunday, October 9, 1938 2:00 pm (ET) at Yankee Stadium in Bronx, New York
Team	1	2	3	4	5	6	7	8	9	R	H	E
Chicago	0	0	0	1	0	0	0	2	0	3	8	1
New York	0	3	0	0	0	1	0	4	X	8	11	1
WP: Red Ruffing (2–0) LP: Bill Lee (0–2); Home runs: CHC: Ken O'Dea (1); NYY: Tommy Henrich (1)

Game 4 was a rematch of the Game 1 starters, Ruffing vs. Lee. Like the closely contested series opener, it stayed close until New York pulled away with four runs in the bottom of the eighth.

In the bottom of the second, the Yankees struck for three runs. Hoag reached on Hack's throwing error from the hot corner, and advanced to third on a Gordon single. Ruffing helped his own cause by singling in Hoag, and Crosetti's triple to left scored Gordon and Ruffing. The Cubs broke the shutout with a Billy Jurges fielder's choice scoring Demaree, but in the sixth the Bombers got the run back with Henrich's solo homer off veteran Cub reliever Charlie Root.

In the top of the eighth, the Cubs cut the New York lead to one with a Ken O'Dea home run scoring Cavarretta ahead of him. But in the bottom half, the Yankees broke the game open with a four-run outburst off four Cub pitchers—Vance Page, Larry French, Tex Carleton and Dean. Crosetti drove in two with a double off Dean, giving him four RBI for the game and six for the Series. As in Game 1, Ruffing went the distance, allowing two earned runs and eight hits with six strikeouts.

This was the last World Series game ever played by Yankee first baseman Lou Gehrig. He had one hit in four at-bats. Defensively he had five putouts and two assists.

== Composite line score ==
1938 World Series (4–0): New York Yankees (A.L.) over Chicago Cubs (N.L.)

Team	1	2	3	4	5	6	7	8	9	R	H	E
New York Yankees	0	7	0	0	2	4	0	7	2	22	37	6
Chicago Cubs	1	0	3	1	1	0	0	3	0	9	33	3
Total attendance: 200,833 Average attendance: 50,208; Winning player's share: $5,729 Losing player's share: $4,675

== Umpires ==
Umpires Cal Hubbard and Lou Kolls were selected from the American League while Charley Moran and Ziggy Sears were chosen from the National League by Commissioner Kenesaw Mountain Landis.

== See also ==
- List of World Series sweeps
