= Fort Worth Cats (Texas League) =

- 1888–1964; (1888–1890, 1892, 1895–1898, 1902–1942, 1946–1959, 1964); Fort Worth, Texas

Minor league affiliations
- Class: AA (1964); AAA (1959); AA (1946–1958); A1 (1936–1942); A (1921–1935); B (1911–1920); C (1907–1910); D (1906); C (1904–1905); D (1902–1903); C (1896–1898); B (1892, 1895)
- League: Texas League (1964); American Association (1959); Texas League (1902–1942, 1946–1958); Texas Association (1896–1898); Texas-Southern League (1895); Texas League (1888–1890, 1892)

Major league affiliations
- Team: Chicago Cubs (1957–1959, 1964); Brooklyn Dodgers (1946–1956); Cincinnati Reds (1935); Detroit Tigers (1919–1929)

Minor league titles
- Dixie Series titles (8): 1920; 1921; 1923; 1924; 1925; 1930; 1937; 1939
- League titles (13): 1895; 1905; 1920; 1921; 1922; 1923; 1924; 1925; 1930; 1937; 1939; 1948; 1958
- First-half titles (6): 1906; 1920; 1921; 1922; 1924; 1925
- Second-half titles (9): 1895; 1904; 1919; 1920; 1921; 1922; 1924; 1925; 1930

Team data
- Name: Fort Worth Cats (1936–1942, 1946–1959, 1964); Fort Worth Colts (1897); Fort Worth Panthers (1888–1890, 1892, 1895–1896, 1898, 1902–1935)
- Ballpark: LaGrave Field (1926–1964); Panther Park (1915–1925); Morris Park (1911–1914); Haines Park (1907–1910)

The Fort Worth Cats (originally the Fort Worth Panthers) were a minor league baseball team that mostly played in the Texas League from 1888 through 1964. They were affiliated with the Indianapolis Indians in 1933, the Brooklyn Dodgers from 1946 to 1956, and the Chicago Cubs from 1957 to 1958. The team joined the American Association in 1959 and then merged with the Dallas Rangers in 1959 to become the Dallas-Fort Worth Rangers. The teams separated again in 1964 when the Cats rejoined the Texas League, but they merged again the following year and became the Dallas-Fort Worth Spurs. The 1920, 1921, 1922, 1924, and 1925 Panthers teams were selected as #4 among the top 100 minor league teams of all time.

== History ==
The Fort Worth Panthers, also called the Fort Worth Cats, played mostly in the Texas League from its founding in 1888 until 1959. The club won league championships in 1895 and 1905. During the late 1910s and early 1920s, Major League Baseball teams would play in Fort Worth against the Panthers on their way from spring training to their home parks. Texas fans enjoyed watching such major leaguers as Ty Cobb, Babe Ruth, Lou Gehrig, and Rogers Hornsby play in their home town.

The Panthers had a winning streak from 1919 to 1925 when they won the regular season title seven years straight. In 1919 they failed to win the playoff for the season, but won the pennant and represented the Texas League in the Dixie Series for the next six years. The Dixie Series was a championship series between the league champions of the Southern Association and Texas Leagues, both of which had established themselves as some of the best in baseball. Amon Carter and other fans would arrange special trains to ensure that avid fans had transportation to these games. Five of the first six championships were won by Fort Worth with their only loss coming in 1922 to Mobile.

Doyle Williams, an FBI agent who portrayed Governor John Connally in the Warren Commission's 1964 reenactment of the Kennedy Assassination, briefly played in the Cats organization in the mid-1930s. The club won both the Texas League and the Dixie Series in 1930, 1937, and 1939. Rogers Hornsby was the Cats' manager in 1942, but World War II put an end to much of minor league baseball.

Following the War, the Cats became a minor league franchise of the Brooklyn Dodgers. In 1948, the Dodgers sent Bobby Bragan to manage the team, which won its last Texas League, but lost the Dixie Series to Birmingham. The first African American player to play for the team was Maury Wills in 1955.

When the Dodgers moved to Los Angeles in 1957, it caused them to shuffle their minor league teams. The Fort Worth franchise was traded to the Chicago Cubs. In 1959, Fort Worth left the Texas League to join the American Association, but they merged with the Dallas Rangers the following year. Fort Worth regained a Texas League franchise for 1964 only, after which there was no professional baseball in Fort Worth for 36 years until a new Fort Worth Cats franchise was founded.

== Year-by-year record ==
Year	Record	Finish	Manager	Playoffs
1888	21–26	--	Mike O'Connor / Mike Firie	Team disbanded June 28
1889	45–51	5th	Jim Horsfield / Paddy Welsh	League disbanded August 12
1890	17–28	5th	John Fogarty	League disbanded June 10
1895	80–40	2nd	Josh Reilly / Sport McAllister / Duke Jantzen	League Champs
1896	72–28	--	Charlie Meyers	Team disbanded August 2
1898	10–10	NA	Jess Reynolds	
1902	48–62	3rd	Ted Sullivan	none
1903	49–59	4th	Con Lucid / Fred Scatzke / Billy Disch	
1904	71–30	1st	Charlie Wills	Lost League Finals
1905	72–59	1st	Al Hubbard / Charlie Wills	none League Champs
1906	78–46	1st (t)	Frederick Canender	Could not field team for playoffs
1907	61–78	5th	Walter Salm / Walt Boles	none
1908	68–74	5th	Dan Curtis / Henry Deiters	none
1909	73–71	6th	Frederick Cavender	none
1910	76–62	3rd	Walter Morris	none
1911	80–67	2nd	Walter Morris	none
1912	59–81	7th	Walter Morris	none
1913	70–83	6th	Walter Morris (34–39) / William Nance (36–44)	none
1914	71–77	5th	William Nance (42–43) / Jake Atz (29–34)	none
1915	81–72	3rd	William Nance (31–31) / Jake Atz (50–41)	none
1916	71–75	5th	Jake Atz (47–34) / Otto McIvor (24–41)	none
1917	90–71	2nd	Jake Atz	none
1918	47–39	2nd	Jake Atz	League suspended operations July 7
1919	94–60	1st	Jake Atz	Lost League Finals
1920	108–40	1st	Jake Atz	none League Champs
1921	107–51	1st	Jake Atz	none League Champs
1922	109–46	1st	Jake Atz	none League Champs
1923	96–56	1st	Jake Atz	none League Champs
1924	109–41	1st	Jake Atz	none League Champs
1925	103–48	1st	Jake Atz	League Champs
1926	83–73	3rd	Jake Atz	none
1927	77–79	4th	Jake Atz	none
1928	83–73	3rd	Jake Atz	
1929	84–76	4th	Jake Atz (41–39) / Frank Snyder (43–37)	
1930	84–69	4th	Frank Snyder	League Champs
1931	90–70	3rd	Art Phelan	
1932	68–81	4th	Dick McCabe / Art Phelan	
1933	63–88	7th	Walter Holke (14–22) / Jake Atz (49–66)	
1934	59–92	7th	Del Pratt	
1935	64–95	8th	Johnnie Heving / Harry McCurdy	
1936	76–78	5th	Harry McCurdy / Homer Peel	
1937	85–74	3rd	Homer Peel	League Champs
1938	61–99	8th	Homer Peel / Cecil Coombs / Jackie Reid	
1939	87–74	4th	Bob Linton	League Champs
1940	52–108	8th	Bob Linton	
1941	78–76	5th	Bob Linton	
1942	84–68	3rd	Rogers Hornsby	Lost in 1st round
1946	101–53	1st	Ray Hayworth	Lost League Finals
1947	95–58	2nd	Les Burge	Lost in 1st round
1948	92–61	1st	Les Burge / George Dockins / Bobby Bragan	League Champs
1949	100–54	1st	Bobby Bragan	Lost League Finals
1950	88–64	2nd	Bobby Bragan	Lost in 1st round
1951	84–77	4th (t)	Bobby Bragan	
1952	86–75	2nd	Bobby Bragan	Lost in 1st round
1953	82–72	3rd	Max Macon	Lost in 1st round
1954	81–80	4th	Al Vincent	Lost League Finals
1955	77–84	6th	Tommy Holmes	
1956	84–70	3rd	Clay Bryant	Lost in 1st round
1957	70–84	6th	Gene Handley	
1958	89–64	1st	Lou Klein	Lost in 1st round
1964	51–89	6th	Alex Grammas	
