= Lou Kolls =

American football player and baseball umpire (1892–1941)

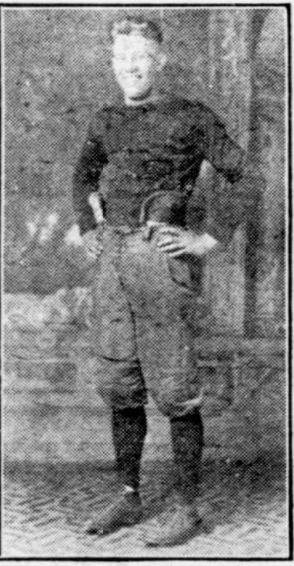
- Kolls as a football player, 1920
- Born: Louis Charles Kolls; December 15, 1892; Rock Island, Illinois, US
- Died: February 23, 1941 (aged 48); Hooppole, Illinois, US
- Resting place: Rock Island National Cemetery
- Occupation: Umpire
- Years active: 1933–1940
- Employer: American League
- Spouse: Irene Tanghe

Louis Charles Kolls (December 15, 1892 – February 23, 1941) was an American professional baseball umpire and American football player. Kolls played in the National Football League from 1920 to 1927 before umpiring in the American League from 1933 to 1940. He umpired in one All-Star Game and one World Series. Kolls was released by the American League a few months before his death.

== Early life ==
Before entering umpiring, Kolls unsuccessfully ran for sheriff in Rock Island, Illinois. He also played semi-pro and minor league baseball. He attended college at St. Ambrose University

== Football career ==
Kolls played seven seasons of professional football, 40 games total), for the 1920 Chicago Cardinals, 1920 Hammond Pros, 1922–1926 Rock Island Independents and 1927 New York Yankees.

== Umpiring career ==
Kolls umpired in the Mississippi Valley League, Western League and International League before making it to the American League in 1933.

Kolls called 1195 games in his major league career. He was named to the staff of the 1936 All-Star Game. In 1938, Kolls suffered a broken nose in spring training, but he umpired a full slate of 161 games and officiated the 1938 World Series. After the 1940 season, American League president Will Harridge issued an outright release to Kolls.

== Personal life ==
Kolls was married to the former Irene Tanghe, who worked as a secretary to U.S. Representative Chester C. Thompson.

== Death ==
Kolls was killed in a two-car accident near Hooppole, Illinois, in 1941. Four occupants of the other car were killed in the head-on collision. Two people were injured, including the sole passenger in the umpire's vehicle.
