= LaVel Freeman =

American baseball player (born 1963)

La Vel Freeman
- Outfielder
- Born: February 18, 1963 (age 55); Oakland, California
- Batted: Left Threw: Left

MLB debut
- April 7, 1989, for the Milwaukee Brewers

Last MLB appearance
- April 8, 1989, for the Milwaukee Brewers

MLB statistics
- Games: 2
- Runs: 1
- Stats at Baseball Reference

Teams
- Milwaukee Brewers (1989)

LaVel Maurice Freeman (born February 18, 1963) is a former Major League Baseball player.

Freeman was born in Oakland, California in 1963 and attended John F. Kennedy High School in Sacramento. In 1981, he played with fellow future Major Leaguer Greg Vaughn on an American Legion Baseball team which won the California state title. He was drafted out of high school by the Chicago White Sox in the 30th round of the 1981 MLB draft but did not sign. He went on to attend Sacramento City College and was drafted in the January phase of the 1983 MLB draft by the Milwaukee Brewers.

In 1987, Freeman hit .395 for the El Paso Diablos. As of September 2018 this is the second-highest minor league batting average since the modern era of Minor League Baseball began in 1963. It was the highest batting average in Texas League history since Danny Clark hit .399 with the San Antonio Bears in 1925. He was later inducted into the Texas League Hall of Fame.

Freeman made his Major League debut with the Milwaukee Brewers at Tiger Stadium in 1989 as the team's starting designated hitter He was twice struck out by Doyle Alexander in three plate appearances. The following day he appeared as a pinch runner for Joey Meyer, eventually coming around to score on a Juan Castillo sacrifice fly.

On June 29, 1989, Freeman was traded to the Texas Rangers in a deal that brought Scott May to the Brewers. Freeman's last year in professional baseball came in 1990 as a member of the Triple A Toledo Mud Hens, the top minor league affiliate of the Detroit Tigers.
