= Bill Walker (baseball) =

American baseball player (1903–1966)

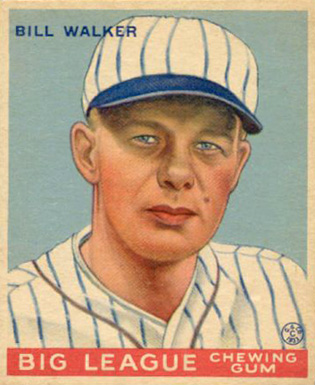
- Pitcher
- Born: October 7, 1903; East St. Louis, Illinois, U.S.
- Died: June 14, 1966 (aged 62); East St. Louis, Illinois, U.S.
- Batted: Right Threw: Left

MLB debut
- September 13, 1927, for the New York Giants

Last MLB appearance
- September 14, 1936, for the St. Louis Cardinals

MLB statistics
- Win–loss record: 97–77
- Earned run average: 3.59
- Strikeouts: 626
- Stats at Baseball Reference

Teams
- New York Giants (1927–1932); St. Louis Cardinals (1933–1936)

Career highlights and awards
- All-Star (1935); World Series champion (1934); 2× NL ERA leader (1929, 1931)

William Henry Walker (October 7, 1903 – June 14, 1966) was an American professional baseball left-handed pitcher over parts of ten seasons (1927–1936) with the New York Giants and St. Louis Cardinals. He was the National League ERA champion twice (1929 and 1931) with New York. For his career, Walker compiled a 97–77 record in 272 appearances with a 3.59 ERA and 626 strikeouts.

Walker was born and later died in East St. Louis, Illinois, on June 14, 1966, at the age of 62. He is buried in Belleville, Illinois.

== See also ==
- List of Major League Baseball annual ERA leaders
