= Scott May (baseball) =

American baseball player (born 1961)

- Pitcher
- Born: November 11, 1961 (age 64); West Bend, Wisconsin
- Batted: Right Threw: Right

MLB debut
- September 2, 1988, for the Texas Rangers

Last MLB appearance
- August 25, 1991, for the Chicago Cubs

MLB statistics
- Win–loss record: 0–0
- Earned run average: 10.61
- Strikeouts: 5

CPBL statistics
- Win–loss record: 7–5
- Earned run average: 3.15
- Strikeouts: 51
- Stats at Baseball Reference

Teams
- Texas Rangers (1988); Chicago Cubs (1991); Wei Chuan Dragons (1993–1994)

Scott Francis May (born November 11, 1961) is a former Major League Baseball pitcher. May was originally drafted in the sixth round of the 1983 Major League Baseball draft by the Los Angeles Dodgers. In 1987, he was traded to the Texas Rangers for Javier Ortiz. He played at the Major League level with the Rangers in 1988. The following year, he was traded along with minor league player Mike Wilson to the Milwaukee Brewers for La Vel Freeman and minor league player Todd Simmons. Later in his career, he signed with the Chicago Cubs and played at the Major League level with the team in 1991.

May attended high school in Almond, Wisconsin and played at the collegiate level at the University of Wisconsin-Stevens Point. He has 2 daughters. Chelsea born 1990 and Alexandria born 1991
