= Joe Marty =

American baseball player (1913–1984)

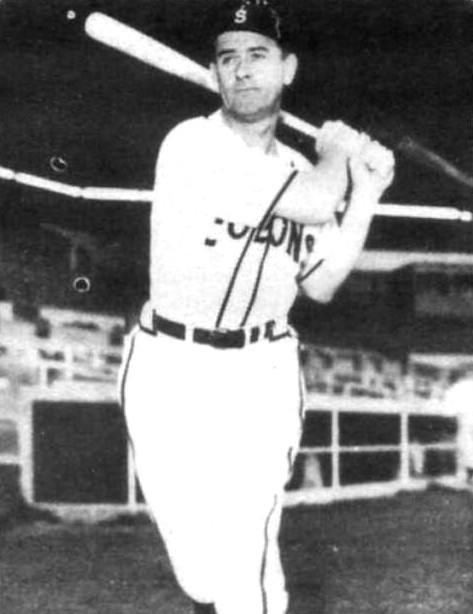
- Marty in 1946
- Centerfielder
- Born: September 1, 1913; Sacramento, California, U.S.
- Died: October 4, 1984 (aged 71); Sacramento, California, U.S.
- Batted: Right Threw: Right

MLB debut
- April 22, 1937, for the Chicago Cubs

Last MLB appearance
- September 28, 1941, for the Philadelphia Phillies

MLB statistics
- Batting average: .261
- Home runs: 44
- Runs batted in: 222
- Stats at Baseball Reference

Teams
- Chicago Cubs (1937–1939); Philadelphia Phillies (1939–1941)

Joseph Anton Marty (September 1, 1913 – October 4, 1984) was an American professional baseball centerfielder. He played in Major League Baseball (MLB) from 1937 to 1941 for the Chicago Cubs and Philadelphia Phillies.

== Career ==
A native of Sacramento, California, Marty graduated from Christian Brothers High School. Marty was a teammate of Joe DiMaggio when they played for the 1934 and 1935 San Francisco Seals, and was the 1936 Pacific Coast League batting average champion.

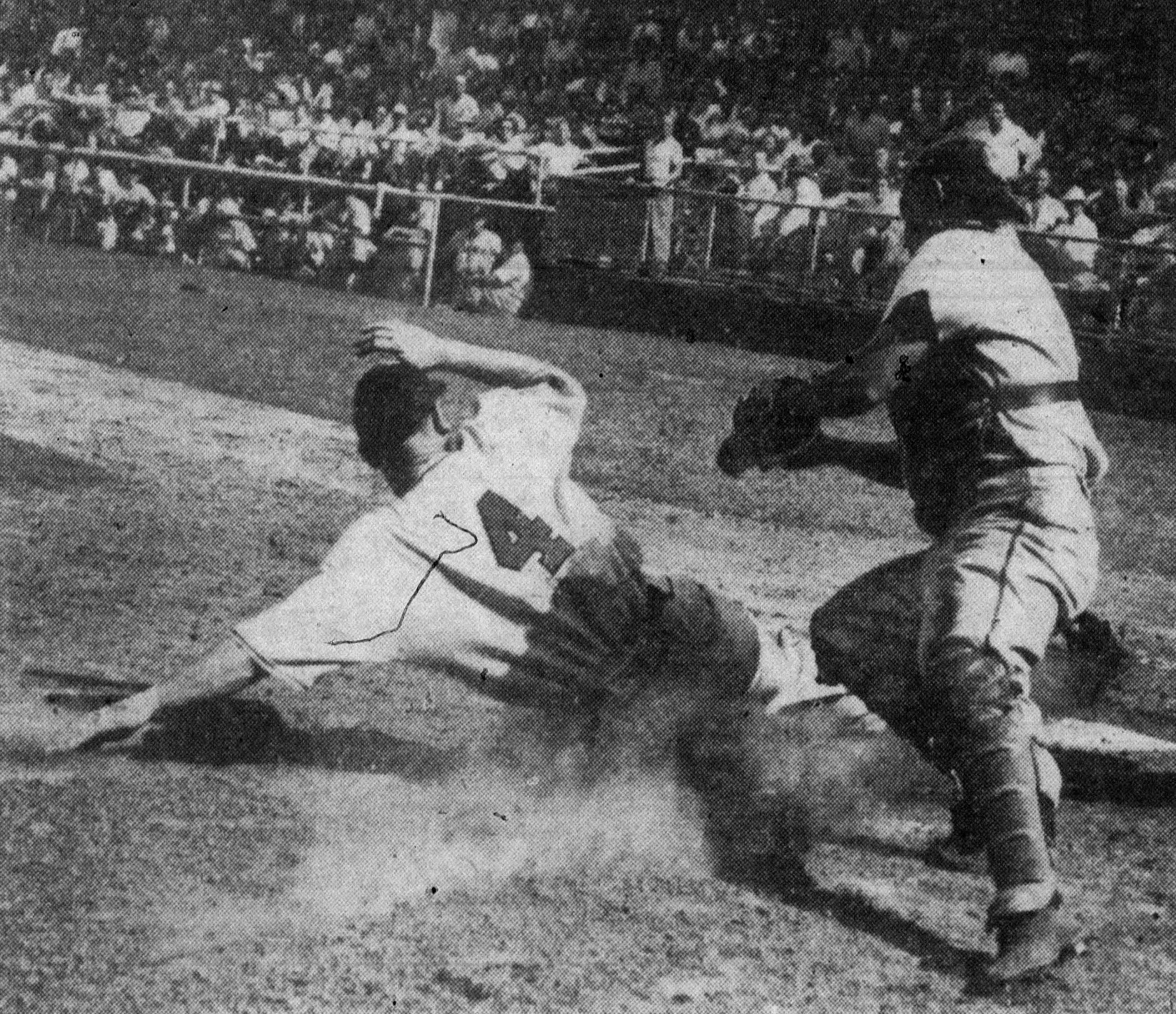
Marty (left), as a member of the Sacramento Solons, slides safe into home plate as Los Angeles Angels catcher Eddie Malone (right) fails to make the tag during a game on September 14, 1947.

Marty was the first Chicago Cubs player to homer in a night game, which he did on July 1, 1938 while playing at Cincinnati. He drove in 5 of the 9 runs in the Cubs' 1938 World Series loss to the New York Yankees. Marty's .500 batting average (6-for-12) led all Yankees and Cubs regulars in the series, although he did not appear in Game 1. On October 8, 1938, in Game 3, Marty's solo home run was the first home run hit in a World Series game by a native Sacramentan.

Over five seasons, in 538 games, Marty posted a .261 batting average (478-1832) with 223 runs scored, 44 home runs and 222 RBI. His career fielding percentage was .972.

== Personal life ==
On October 4, 1984, Marty died after recovering from surgery. He was 71 years of age at the time of his death.
