= Jake Atz =

American baseball player (1879–1945)

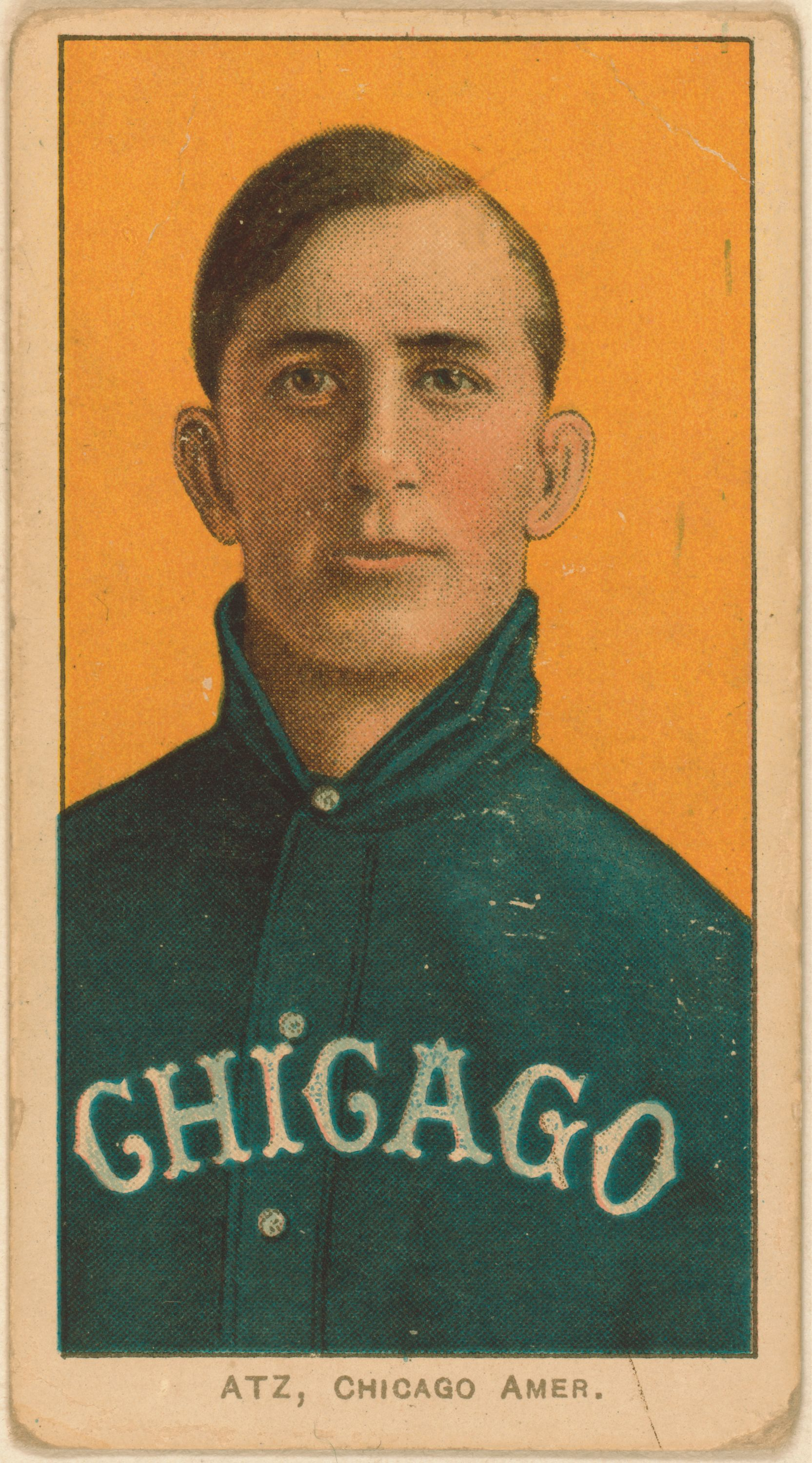
- Second baseman / Shortstop
- Born: July 7, 1879; Washington, D.C., U.S.
- Died: May 22, 1945 (aged 65); New Orleans, Louisiana, U.S.
- Batted: Right Threw: Right

MLB debut
- September 24, 1902, for the Washington Senators

Last MLB appearance
- September 30, 1909, for the Chicago White Sox

MLB statistics
- Batting average: .218
- Home runs: 0
- Runs batted in: 49
- Stats at Baseball Reference

Teams
- Washington Senators (1902); Chicago White Sox (1907–1909)

Jacob Henry Atz (July 7, 1879 – May 22, 1945) was an American professional baseball second baseman. He played in Major League Baseball (MLB) for the Washington Senators and Chicago White Sox. He also was the most successful minor league managers of the 1920s, winning all or parts of the Texas League championship in seven consecutive seasons (1919–1925) as skipper of the Fort Worth Panthers. Atz was born in Washington, D.C.

He is also credited as John Atz in many baseball sources.

== Baseball career ==
Atz played in the major leagues during 4 seasons, 1902 for the Washington Senators and 1907-09 for the Chicago White Sox. He made his debut on September 24, 1902, and played in his last major league game on September 30, 1909. He played for 20 years in the minor leagues, finishing his career in 1921 with the Ft. Worth Panthers in the Texas League.

In four major league seasons, Atz played in 209 games, had 605 at bats, 64 runs, 132 hits, 21 doubles, three triples, 49 RBIs, 23 stolen bases, 69 walks, a .218 batting average, .304 on-base percentage, .263 slugging percentage, and 33 sacrifice hits.

His first managerial assignment was for the Providence Grays of the East League in 1911, and he failed dismally, losing 69 of 108 games (.361). Three years later, in 1914, he took over the Fort Worth Panthers. His Panthers had winning records in his first 13 seasons. During their seven-year skein as kings of the Texas League, the Panthers won over 100 games five times – with records of 108–40 (.730) in 1920, 107–51 (.677) in 1921, 109–43 (.717) in 1922, 109–41 (.727) in 1924, and 103–48 (.682) in 1925. In 1926, the Panthers fell to third and Atz would not win another pennant until 1939, with Henderson, Texas based Henderson Oilers in the Class C East Texas League, three levels below the Texas League. His career record as a manager in the minors over 27 seasons was 1,972 wins, 1,619 losses (.549), still one of the best winning percentages among longtime minor league skippers.

== Personal life ==
Atz died on May 22, 1945, in New Orleans at the age of 64.

== Sources ==
- Career statistics from Baseball Reference · Fangraphs · Baseball Reference (Minors) · Retrosheet · Baseball Almanac
