= Walter Morris =

American baseball player (1880–1961)

- Shortstop
- Born: January 31, 1880; Rockwall, Texas, U.S.
- Died: August 2, 1961 (aged 81); Dallas, Texas, U.S.
- Batted: Right Threw: Right

MLB debut
- August 30, 1908, for the St. Louis Cardinals

Last MLB appearance
- September 26, 1908, for the St. Louis Cardinals

MLB statistics
- Batting average: .178
- Home runs: 0
- Runs batted in: 2
- Stats at Baseball Reference

Teams
- St. Louis Cardinals (1908)

John Walter Morris (January 31, 1880 – August 2, 1961) was an American professional baseball player. He was a shortstop for one season (1908) with the St. Louis Cardinals. For his career, he compiled a .178 batting average in 73 at bats, with two runs batted in.

An alumnus of the University of Texas at Austin, he was born in Rockwall, Texas and died in Dallas, Texas at the age of 81.
