= Clarksdale Cubs =

- 1921–1923; (1904, 1913, 1921–1923); Clarksdale, Mississippi

Minor league affiliations
- Class: Class D (1904, 1913, 1921–1923)
- League: Delta League (1904); Cotton States League (1913); Mississippi State League (1921); Cotton States League (1922–1923)

Major league affiliations
- Team: None

Minor league titles
- League titles (1): 1904
- Conference titles (1): 1921
- Wild card berths (0): None

Team data
- Name: Clarksdale (1904); Clarksdale Swamp Angels (1913); Clarksdale Cubs (1921–1923)
- Ballpark: Ginners Park (1921–1923)

The Clarksdale Cubs were a minor league baseball team based in Clarksdale, Mississippi. The Clarksdale "Cubs' played in 1921 as the pennant winner of the Mississippi State League, before returning to the reformed Cotton States League in 1922, playing until the league folded following the 1923 season.

Clarksdale first hosted minor league baseball in 1904, with the team winning the championship of the six-team class D level Delta League before the league folded after one season. The 1913 Clarksdale Swamp Angels team first joined the Cotton States League.

The Clarksdale Cubs teams hosted home minor league teams at Ginners Park in the era.

== History ==
=== 1904 Delta League: First Clarksdale team wins championship ===
Clarksdale, Mississippi first hosted minor league baseball in 1904, when the Clarksdale baseball club became members of the Class D level Delta League in the only season of play for the league. The Delta League began the season with four charter teams, with Clarksdale joining the Brookhaven, Mississippi based (Brookhaven), Jackson Senators and the Yazoo City Zoos teams in beginning league play. One week into the season, on May 16, 1904, the league expanded to six teams, adding teams from Canton, Mississippi (Canton) and Hattiesburg, Mississippi (Hattiesburg) joining the Delta League.

In their first season of minor league play, the "Clarksdale" team won the Delta League championship, playing the season under manager Dave Gaston. The first place Clarksdale team led the final Delta League standings, and the league held no playoffs. In winning the championship, Clarksdale ended the season with a record of 67–31, finishing 4.0 games ahead of second place Yazoo City Zoos who ended the season with record of 62–32. Third place in the standings was Canton (43–45), who were followed by the Jackson Senators (47–53), Hattiesburg (36–49), and last place Brookhaven (27–70) in the six-team league. Player/manager Dave Gaston of Clarksdale led the Cotton States League with 91 total hits and hit .278 in 90 games. Clarksdale pitcher Harry Kane led the league with both 131 strikeouts and an 18–3 record.

A left-handed pitcher, Harry "Klondike" Kane had pitched briefly in the major leagues for the St. Louis Browns in 1903 and the Detroit Tigers in 1904 before his season with Clarksdale in 1905. In 1906, Kane pitched in 6 games for the Philadelphia Phillies. Following his playing career, Kane became a minor league umpire. He died at age 49 in Portland, Oregon, on September 15th, 1932, while working as an umpire in the Pacific Coast League.

The Delta League permanently folded after the 1904 season.

=== 1913: Cotton States League play ===
After the Delta League folded following the 1904 season, Clarksdale was without minor league baseball until 1913. The Clarksdale "Swamp Angels" resumed minor league baseball, becoming members of the six-team Class D level Cotton States League. The 1913 Swamp Angels replaced the Yazoo City Zoos franchise in the league.

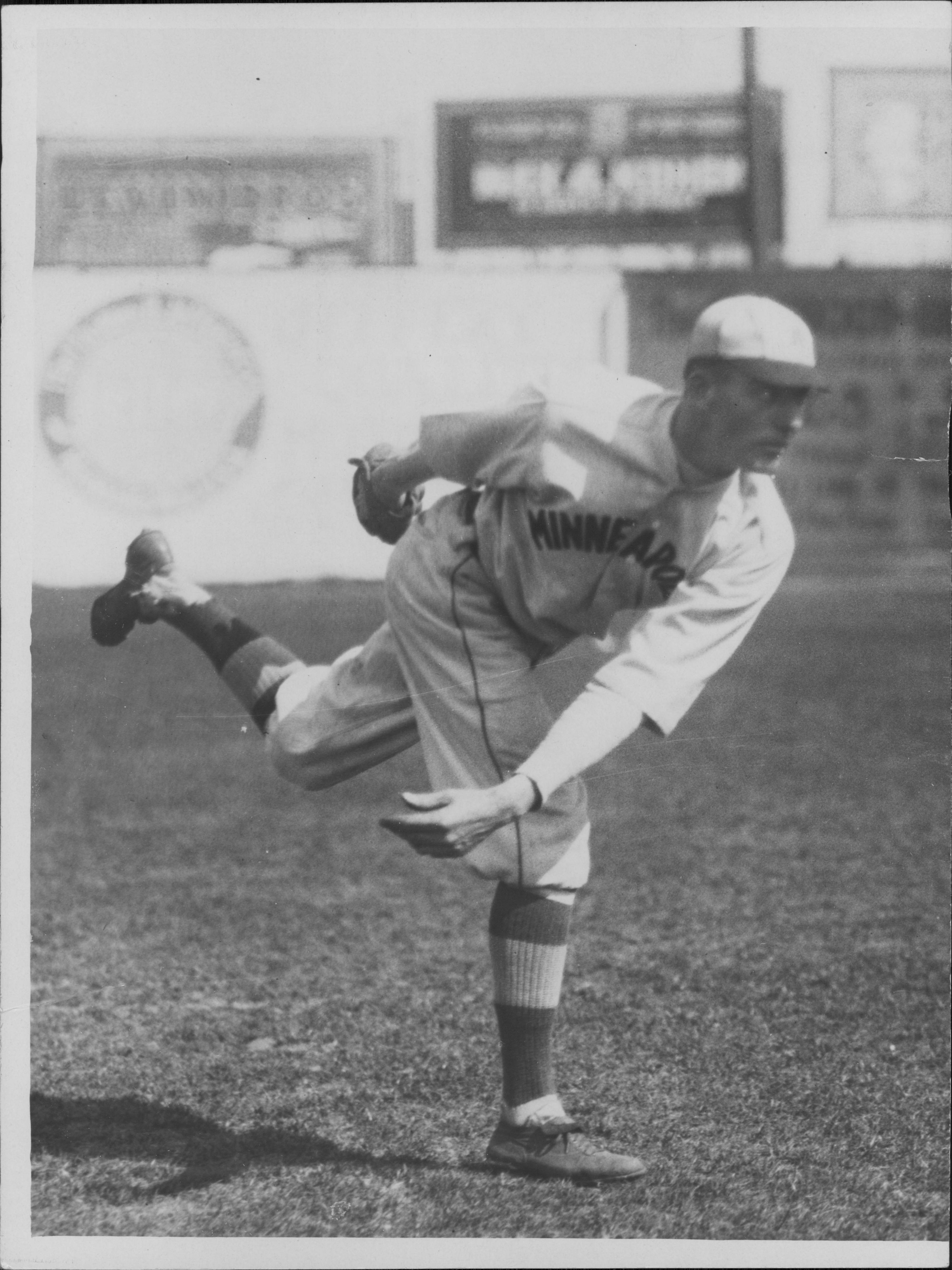
(1917) Claude Thomas, Minneapolis Millers. Thomas pitched for Clarksville in 1913.

Clarksdale joined the Columbus Joy Riders, Jackson Lawmakers, Meridian Metropolitans, Pensacola Snappers and Selma Centralites teams in beginning Cotton States League play on April 10, 1913.

In Clarksdale's first season of Cotton States League play, the Swamp Angels ended the season in fifth place in the six-team Class D level league. With a 40–58 final record, Clarksdale played the season under managers Edward Kerr and Carlos Smith. Clarksdale ended the season 32.5 games behind the first place Jackson Senators in the final league standings. No playoffs were held, as the Cotton States League stopped play early, on August 15, 1913. Player/manager Smith, who split the season between Meridian and Clarksdale, won the league batting title, hitting .361. Dutch Bernsen of Clarksdale led the league with 117 hits.

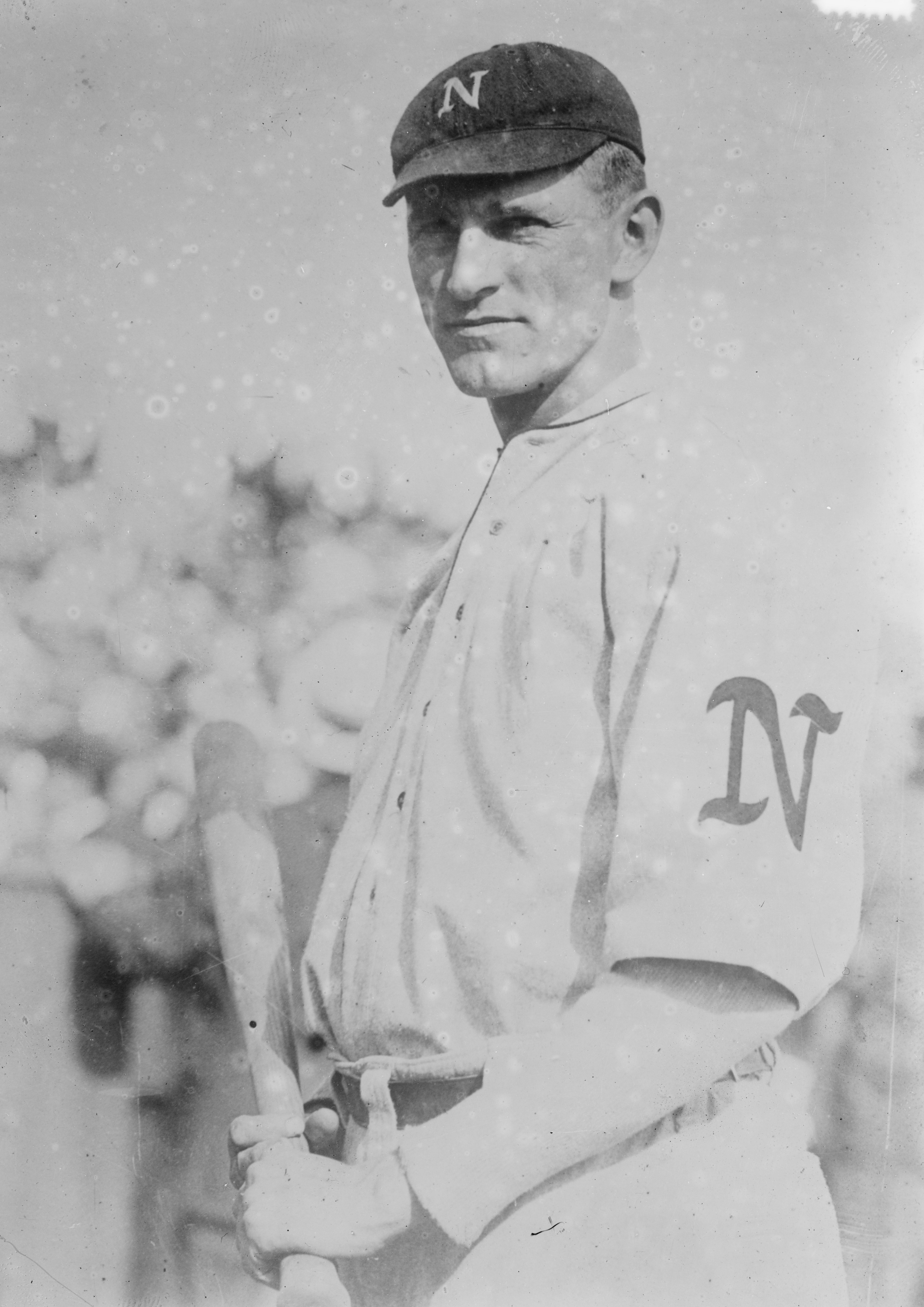
Clarence Kraft in 1914. Kraft hit .328 for Clarksdale in 1913, before making his major league debut with the 1914 World Series champion Boston Braves.

Clarance "Big Boy" Kraft played 57 games for Clarksdale in 1913, hitting .328 with 9 home runs before moving to the New Orleans Pelicans, where he hit .366 in 56 games. Kraft also had a 7–7 record in 16 games as a pitcher for Clarksdale. Kraft made his major league debut with the 1914 World Series champion Boston Braves in their 1914 season. Kraft played his final season for the minor league Fort Worth Panthers in 1924, hitting 55 home runs with 196 RBI before retiring following the season. Kraft opened an automobile dealership in Fort Worth following his final season.

Claude Thomas pitched for Clarksdale in 1913, posting a 9–11 record in 24 games. Thomas had an 18-season professional career and pitched for the 1916 Washington Senators.

After the conclusion of the shortened 1913 season, the Cotton States League did not reform for the 1914 season due to onset of World War I, which affected many minor leagues.

=== 1921: Mississippi State League ===
In 1921, Clarksdale resumed hosting minor league play when the Clarksdale "Cubs" became charter members of the four-team Class D level Mississippi State League. Clarksdale joined with the Greenwood Indians, Jackson Red Sox, and Meridian Mets teams in beginning Mississippi State League play on April 25, 1921.

James "Baxter" Sparks became the Clarksdale manager in 1921. Sparks pitched for the Yazoo City team in the 1904 Delta League and threw a no-hitter against Clarksdale en route to winning 21 consecutive games that season. Sparks later coached the University of Mississippi 1917 baseball team, his only season of college coaching.

The Clarksdale Cubs won the Mississippi State League pennant. Clarksville end3d the regular season in first place in the overall league standings and won a pennant in the split-season schedule. With a record of 65–44, the Cubs finished 6.5 ahead of second-place Greenwood in the overall standings. In the split-season schedule, Clarksdale won the second-half title after Greenwood had won the first-half, setting up the playoff final between the two teams. In the playoff final between the two split-season champions, Greenwood defeated Clarksdale 5 games to 0 to win the Mississippi State League championship. During the league playoffs, Red Lucas threw a no-hitter in a shutout win for Greenwood over Clarksdale and their pitcher Earl Webb. Cubs pitcher Hal Goldsmith won 16 games to lead the league.

In his first professional season at age 22, following his collegiate career at St. Lawrence University, Hal Goldsmith pitched for the New Orleans Pelicans in 1921, following the end of the Mississippi State League season. Goldsmith later pitched in the major leagues for the Boston Braves from 1926 to 1929 and for the St. Louis Cardinals in 1930.

Earl Webb was both a pitcher and a regular position player for Clarksdale in 1921. At age 23, in his first professional season, Webb hit .282 with 7 home runs in 309 at bats for the Cubs. As a pitcher he compiled a 12–8 record. Webb was married and had a family and had worked as a coal miner for many years. After having success as a player for local mill teams, his father convinced him to give up coal mining and pursue a professional career in baseball. He had originally signed to play with the Memphis Chickasaws at age 18 but never reported. After the talk with his father, he reached out to Memphis, who signed him to a contract and assigned him to Clarksdale. Webb was signed by the New York Giants following his season with Clarksdale, but he refused report to the team in New York and spent two seasons with Memphis. Remaining in the minor leagues, Webb gave up pitching after the 1924 season and became strictly an outfielder. In 1925, at age 27, he made his major league debut with the New York Giants. Webb played seven seasons in the major leagues with the Giants, the Chicago Cubs, Boston Red Sox, Detroit Tigers and Chicago White Sox, retiring with a lifetime batting average of .306 and an OBP of .381, playing in 650 career major league games. In 1931, while playing with the Red Sox, Webb hit 67 doubles, to set a major league record for doubles in a season, a record that still stands today. Following his baseball career, Webb returned to his mining career, becoming a foreman with the Consolidated Coal Company in Jenkins, Kentucky, while also serving as the manager of the company's semi-professional baseball team.

William Bobo began his baseball career with Clarksdale in 1921, hitting .275 in 110 games with the Cubs. After his season with Clarksdale became the player/manager of the Indians Greenwood in 1922 and 1923, while simultaneously coaching in college. In 1924, Bobo was hired to serve as the player/manager for the Hattiesburg Pinetoppers in the Cotton States League. Bobo had coached the Hattiesburg High School football team to an 8–1–1 record in 1922 after playing the season with Greenwood. In September 1924, Bobo was named as the athletic director at Mississippi State Teachers College (now the University of Southern Mississippi) in Hattiesburg. Bobo was the Mississippi State Teachers College football coach from 1924 to 1927, compiling a record of 9–17–4. Bobo was also the head basketball coach at Mississippi State Teachers College, coaching the team from 1924 to 1928, with an overall record of 31–17–1. For his third coaching position, Bobo served as and the Mississippi State Teachers College head baseball coach from 1925 to 1928 and compiled a record of 19–10–1 in his tenure.

The Mississippi State League permanently folded following the playoff finals and the completion of the 1921 season. In 1922, all four Mississippi State League franchises became members of the Cotton States League, which reformed after folding following the 1913 season.

=== 1922 & 1923: Cotton States League return ===
When the Cotton States League reformed for the 1922 season, the Clarksdale Cubs continued play the six-team Class D level league. The Greenville Bucks and Vicksburg Hill Billies teams joined the Mississippi State League holdover Clarksdale Cubs, Greenwood Indians, Jackson Red Sox, and Meridian Mets teams in the new Cotton States League. The reformed Cotton States League began play on April 20, 1922.

With a record of 49–70, Clarksdale Cubs finished in fifth place in the Cotton States League overall regular season standings. The Cotton States League played a split-season schedule in 1922. Tom Toland and Harry Collenberger served as the Clarksdale managers during the 1922 season. In the overall standings Clarksdale finished 27 games behind first-place Greenwood in the overall standings. Clarksdale did not qualify for the playoff as Meridian won the first half pennant of the split season schedule and Greenwood won the second half pennant. Greenwood then swept Meridian in four games to win the league championship

Manager Tom Toland briefly managed the Clarkdale Cubs in 1922 and became Greenwood's 1923 manager. While serving as the manager, Toland was also the president of the Greenwood franchise, and he resumed that role with the future Greenwood minor league teams until his death in Greenwood on April 18, 1937.

In 1923, the Clarksdale Cubs continued play as the Cotton States League expanded to become an eight-team Class D level league. The league expanded from a six-team league to an eight-team league in for the 1923 season, adding franchises from Hattiesburg, Mississippi and Laurel, Mississippi as the expansion teams. The Hattiesburg Hubman and Laurel Lumberjacks, joined the returning Greenville Swamp Angels, Greenville Indians, Jackson Senators, Meridian Mets, and Vicksburg Hill Billies teams and joined with Greenwood in beginning league play on April 18, 1923.

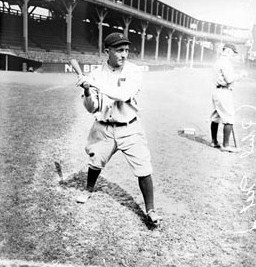
(1914) Hal Irelan, Philadelphia Phillies. Irelan managed the 1923 Clarksdale Cubs in their final season.

The 1923 Cubs ended the season in fourth place as the eight-team Cotton States League played a shortened season, folding before the season schedule was completed. On July 24, the league stopped play for the season. With a record of 41–38 at the time the league folded, the Clarksdale Cubs ended the season 4 games behind the first place Greenville Swamp Angels in the standings. The Clarksdale Cubs were managed during their final season by Hal Irelan. Leonard Glassbrenner of Clarksdale scored 56 runs to lead the league.

Despite folding the season before, the Cotton States League resumed play in 1924, playing as a six-team Class D level league, but without a Clarksdale franchise. The Greenville, Greenwood, and Meridian franchises also folded from the league. The new Brookhaven Truckers and Monroe Drillers teams joined the returning Hattiesburg Hubman, Jackson Senators, Laurel Lumberjacks and Vicksburg Hill Billies franchises in the six-team 1923 Cotton States League.

Following the folding of the Cubs, Clarksdale was without a minor league team for ten seasons. In 1934, minor league play resumed when the Clarksdale Ginners team was formed. The Baton Rouge Red Sticks, who were playing in the East Dixie League, moved to Clarksdale, Mississippi during the season and the team was renamed the "Ginners". That season, the team had a final record 47–82. The Ginners then rejoined the 1936 Cotton States League, beginning another tenure of Clarksdale teams in the league.

== The ballpark ==
The Clarksdale Cubs teams hosted home minor league games at Ginners Park. The ballpark was also called Community Park. In the era, the ballpark site was bordered by 4th Street, Tennessee Street, South Edwards Avenue & Louisiana Avenue in Clarksdale. Today, the ballpark parcel contains commercial property and an open field.

On June 3, 1936, the ballpark hosted a Negro Southern League game between the Birmingham Black Barons and the Claybrook Tigers.

== Timeline ==
Year(s)	# Yrs.	Team	Level	League	Ballpark
1904	1	Clarksdale	Class D	Delta League	Ginners Park
1913	1	Clarksdale Swamp Angels	Class D	Cotton States League	Ginners Park
1921	1	Clarksdale Cubs	Class D	Mississippi State League	Ginners Park
1922–1923	2	Clarksdale Cubs	Class D	Cotton States League	Ginners Park

== Year–by–year records ==
Year	Record	Finish	Manager	Playoffs
1904	67–31	1st	Dave Gaston	No playoffs held Won league championship
1913	40–58	5th	Edward Kerr / Carlos Smith	Season ended August 15; No playoffs held
1921	65–44	1st	Baxter Sparks	Won second half pennant Lost in finals
1922	49–70	5th	Tom Toland / Harry Collenberger	Did not qualify
1923	41–38	4th	Baxter Sparks / Hal Irelan	League disbanded July 24

== Notable alumni ==
- Herschel Bobo (1921)
- Happy Foreman (1921)
- Hal Goldsmith (1921)
- Harry Kane (1904)
- Clarence Kraft (1913)
- John Merritt (1913)
- Claude Thomas (1913)
- Earl Webb (1921)

== See also ==
- Clarksdale Cubs players
- Clarksdale Swamp Angels players
- Clarksdale (minor league baseball) players
