= Clarksdale Planters =

- 1934–1951; (1934–1941, 1947–1951); Clarksdale, Mississippi

Minor league affiliations
- Previous classes: Class-C
- League: Cotton States League
- Previous leagues: Delta League (1904); East Dixie League (1934–1935)

Major league affiliations
- Previous teams: Boston Red Sox (1938–1939); Cleveland Indians (1936)

Team data
- Previous names: Clarksdale (1904); Clarksdale Ginners (1934–1936, 1941); Clarksdale Red Sox (1937–1940)
- Previous parks: Unknown (1935–1936); Ginners Park (1937); Community Park (1938–1951)

The Clarksdale Planters are a defunct minor league baseball team that was based in Clarksdale, Mississippi. They played under different names over their 13 nonconsecutive seasons, including the Ginners (1934–1936, 1941), the Red Sox (1937–1940), and finally the Planters (1947–1951). The team started out in the East Dixie League from 1934 to 1935, and later joined the Cotton States League from 1937 to 1941, and 1947 to 1951. Clarksdale ceased to have a team for five seasons (1942–1946). However, the team returned in 1947 under the Planters name. The team was classified as a Class-C team for all of their 13 years. Clarksdale was affiliated with the Cleveland Indians for one season (1936), and the Boston Red Sox for two seasons (1938–1939).

== Early history ==
Clarksdale, Mississippi has a professional baseball history stretching back to 1904. That season, the Clarksdale baseball club of the Delta League began its one-year run. They were classified as Class D. The team featured Harry Kane and Beals Becker who were the only two players on the club that played or went on to play in Major League Baseball. After the 1904 season, the Clarksdale club ceased operations.

In 1913, Clarksdale included in Cotton States League, who at this time were classified as a Class-D league. The team played under the name the Clarksdale Swamp Angels and featured three players, Clarence Kraft, John Merritt, and Claude Thomas, who had or went on to have major league experience. Like the first professional team in Clarksdale, the Swamp Angels folded after one season. In 1921, Clarksdale was again a home to a professional baseball team. This time the Clarksdale Cubs played for three seasons before folding. Their first season, 1921, the Cubs played in the Mississippi State League. The next two seasons, however, the Cubs played in the Cotton States League. Over their three-year stint, the Cubs were classified as a Class-D team. The 1921 team featured major leaguers Happy Foreman and Earl Webb.

== Ginners and Red Sox ==
In 1934, the Baton Rouge Red Sticks, who were playing in the East Dixie League, moved to Clarksdale, Mississippi during the season and the team was renamed the "Ginners". That season, the team went 47–82. Bill Marshall and Doc Land, who both played limited time in the major leagues over their careers, tied for the most hits on the Ginners with 147. Doc Land led the team in doubles with 32, Carl Fairly led the team in triples with 12, and Frank Myers led the team in home runs with five. Pitching leaders included George Mills and Roy Mackey in wins with 10, Mackey in losses, and Mackey in innings pitched with 209. Until 1936, the Clarksdale club played as the Planters, however, in 1937 the team was renamed the Red Sox.

== Year-by-year results ==
Season	Manager(s)	Record	MLB affiliate
1934	—	47–82	—
1935	Harry Strohm	—	—
1936	Harry Strohm	—	Cleveland Indians
1937	Red Barnes	—	—
1938	Nemo Leibold	—	Boston Red Sox
1939	Leroy Jones	—	Boston Red Sox
1940	Leroy Jones	—	—
1941	Leroy Jones	48–88	—
1947	Calvin Chapman	—	—
1948	Chet Morgan	—	—
1949	Chet Morgan, Clinton Dahlberg	—	—
1950	Chet Morgan	62–76	—
1951	Herschel Bobo, Joseph Kopach, Jim Pruett, Dolph Regelsky	53–87	—
