= Greenwood Scouts =

- 1910–1912; (1910–1912, 1921–1923); Greenwood, Mississippi

Minor league affiliations
- Class: Class D (1910–1912, 1921–1923)
- League: Cotton States League (1910–1912); Mississippi State League (1921); Cotton States League (1922–1923)

Major league affiliations
- Team: None

Minor league titles
- League titles (4): 1910; 1912; 1921; 1922
- Conference titles (2): 1921; 1922
- Wild card berths (0): None

Team data
- Name: Greenwood Scouts (1910–1912); Greenwood Indians (1921–1923)
- Ballpark: Wright Park (1910–1912, 1921–1923)

The Greenwood Scouts were a minor league baseball team based in Greenwood, Mississippi. From 1910 to 1912, the "Scouts" played as a member of the Class D level Cotton States League, winning the 1910 and 1912 league championships before the league folded.

The Greenwood "Indians' resumed play in 1921 as the champion of the Class D level Mississippi State League. The Indians returned to the reformed Cotton States League in 1922 and won the league championship before folding from the league following the 1923 season.

Both the Greenwood Scouts and Indians teams hosted home minor league teams at Wright Park in Greenwood.

== History ==
=== 1910 to 1912: Two Cotton States League championships ===
Greenwood, Mississippi first hosted minor league baseball in 1910, when the Greenwood "Scouts" became members of the six-team, Class D level Cotton States League. The Cotton States League was reforming after not playing the 1909 season and the Greenwood team was added as a new franchise in the league. The Greenwood Scouts joined with the Hattiesburg Timberjacks, Jackson Tigers, Meridian White Ribbons, Vicksburg Hill Billies and Yazoo City Zoos teams in beginning Cotton States League play on May 2, 1910. In an era where team nicknames were often coined by local newspapers, the 1910 Greenwood team was also known as the "Chauffeurs."

Before a Greenwood game in Jackson, Mississippi in July 1910, a former Cotton States umpire named Hunt was in Jackson. One week earlier, Hunt had been fired by the Cotton States League. Greenwood was in town for a game against the Jackson Tigers and public altercations involving Hunt and several Greenwood players occurred. According to reports, while on the corner of Mill and Capitol Streets, Hunt and Greenwood player Orth Collins (who later managed the team) encountered each other. Collins accused Hunt of betting on games that he had umpired. Hunt then punched Collins, knocking him down. Later, Hunt went to the Lemon Hotel, where the Greenwood players were gathering in the lobby. Greenwood catcher Jack Law and Hunt began fighting in the lobby when Hunt fell over a chair and fell to the floor, with Greenville's Ray Rolling, joining the fight while Law kicked Hunt in the eye. Other Greenville players, including Clyde Frakes, cornered Hunt, who began fight off each, knocking them to the floor with punches. Deputy Sheriff Sanders arrived on the scene and arrested Hunt and six Greenville players. Four players were quickly released, but Hunt, Rolling and Collins were jailed overnight before appearing in court the next day. The three were released from jail after paying court issued fines.

In their first season of play, the Greenwood Scouts won the 1910 Cotton States League championship. In the final standings of the Cotton States League, Greenwood placed first in the six-team league, while playing the season under manager Woody Thornton. With a 71–36 record, Greenwood finished first, ending the season just ½ game ahead the second place Jackson Tigers (71–37) in final standings of the six-team league. The Cotton states League did not have a playoff format in 1910. Greenwood pitcher Robert Lee Vernuelle led the Cotton States League with 24 wins. Greenwood manager Woody Thornton came to the team after playing the previous four seasons with the Mobile Sea Gulls of the Cotton States League and Southern Association.

As defending champions, the Greenwood Scouts team continued play in 1911 Cotton States League. The Scouts finished in fifth place in the final standings of six-team Class D level league. With a 46–68 record, the Scouts placed fifth under returning manager Woody Thornton and Orth Collins, finishing 26½ games behind the first place Vicksburg Hill Billies in the six–team league. No league playoffs were held. After leaving Greenwood, manager Woody Thorton finished the 1911 season with the Jackson Drummers in Cotton States League play.

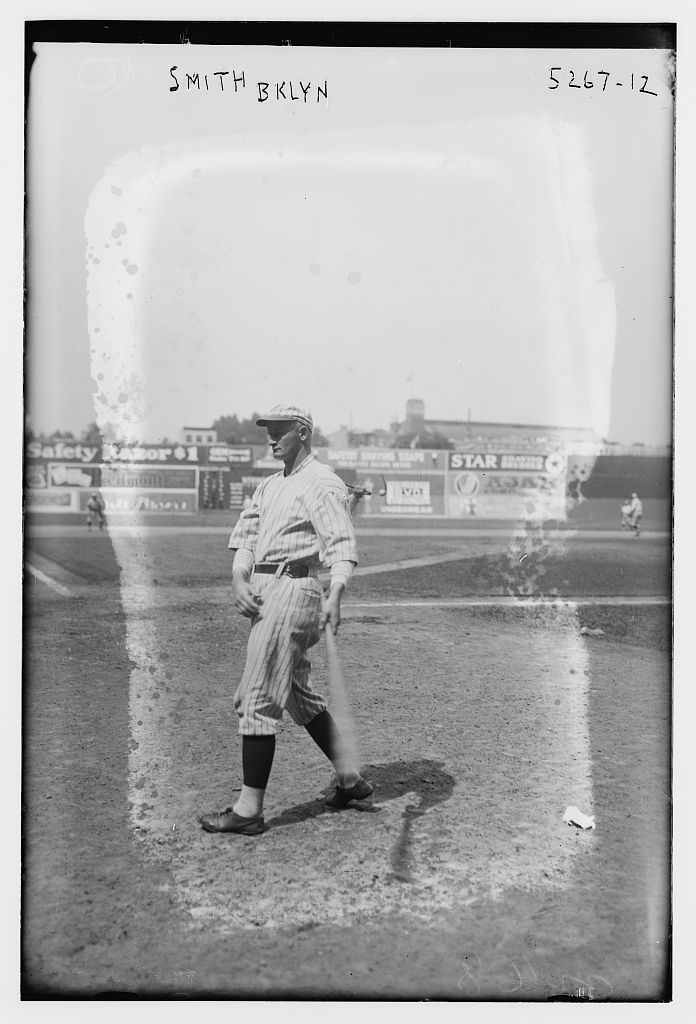
(1920) Sherry Smith, Brooklyn Robins. Smith pitched for Greenwood in 1911 after making his major league earlier in the 1911 season with the Pittsburgh Pirates.

Left-hander Sherry Smith pitched for Greenwood in 1911 at age 20. Smith has made his major league debut with the Pittsburgh Pirates earlier in the 1911 season and was sent by Pittsburgh to Greenwood. With Greenwood, Smith won each of his first three starts for the Scouts. He had a 9–4 record in mid-August when Pittsburgh wished to promote him, however a leg injury, ended his season before he could depart Greenwood. His major league career spanned from 1911 until 1927. Smith pitched for the Pittsburgh Pirates, Brooklyn Robins and Cleveland Indians in his major league career. He then played and managed in the minor leagues through 1932.

Smith had a notable post season career. In Game 2 of the 1916 World Series, Smith was the losing pitcher loser of one of the longest World Series games ever played. Smith pitched a complete game into the 14th inning for the Brooklyn Robins, dueling with the Boston Red Sox starting pitcher, Babe Ruth. The Red Sox the game by the score of 2–1 with a run with two outs in the 14th inning off of Smith. Babe Ruth also pitched a complete game for Boston in the Red Sox' victory.

In the 1920 World Series, on October 7, 1920, Smith was the winning pitcher for Brooklyn in Game 3 of the series against the Cleveland Indians. Smith threw a complete game, three-hitter in a 2–1 Brooklyn victory. In Game 6, of the 1920 series, Smith lost a 1–0 game to with Cleveland's Duster Mails, with both pitchers throwing complete games. In his 14-season career, Smith compiled a 114–118 record with a 3.32 ERA in 2,052.2 innings pitched.

The 1912 Greenwood Scouts continued play as members of the Cotton States League and won the league championship in a shortened season. On June 5, 1912, Greenwood had compiled a 51–64 record when the league stopped play. Playing the season under returning manager Orth Collings and Martin Dudley, Greenwood finished the season in third place, but the first place Vicksburg Hill Billies and other teams had folded during the season. Greenwood was declared the league champion as Vicksburg, the first half winner, had disbanded and Greenwood led the second half standings.

After leaving Greenwood, player/manager Orth Collins joined the Meridian Mets for the remainder of the season in what was his final professional season at age 32.

Manager Martin Dudley came to Greenwood to replace Collins, having started the 1912 season with the Yazoo City Zoos. A catcher, the managerial position with the Scouts was Dudley's first season as a manager. Dudley managed the Thomasville Hornets of the Empire State League in 1913.

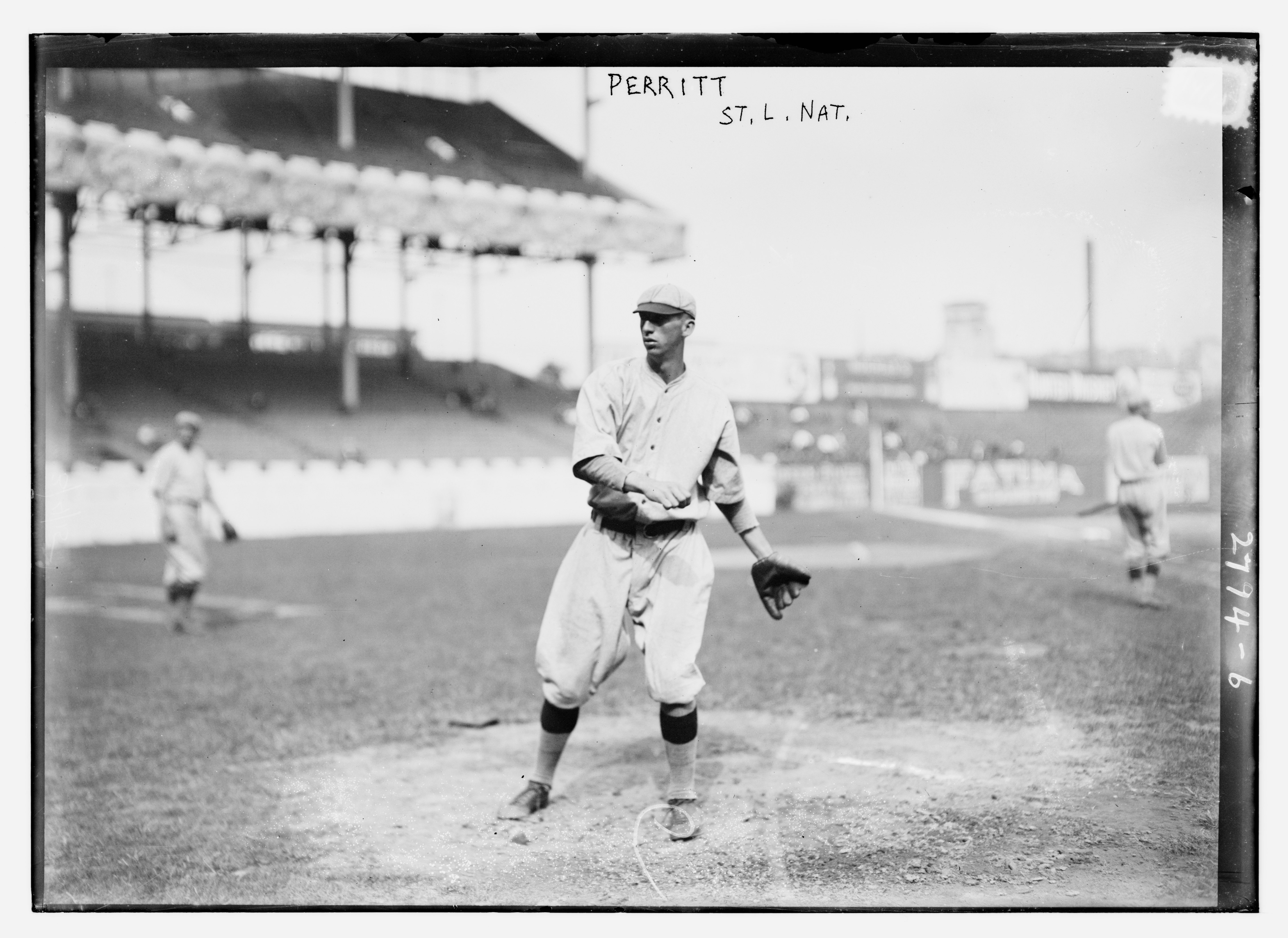
(1914) Pol Perritt, St. Louis Cardinals. Perritt pitched for Greenwood in 1912, before making his major league debut with the St. Louis Cardinals later in the 1912 season.

At age 20, Pol Perritt played for the Scouts in 1912 in his first professional season, splitting the season between the Vicksburg Hill Billies and Greenwood. Between the two teams, Perritt compiled an overall 18–18 record for the season. Perritt had been released by Vicksburg in April, 1912 and was quickly picked up by Greenwood, whom he had pitched against with Vicksburg, catching the attention of Greenwood management. On May 20, 1912, Perritt pitched both games of a doubleheader against Vicksburg, winning one game and losing one. Following the Cotton League season, Perritt was purchased by the St. Louis Cardinals in September 1912. Cardinals scout Bill Armour had signed Perritt and brought Perritt with him on his return to St. Louis. Finishing the season with St. Louis, Perritt compiled a 1–1 record with a 3.19 ERA in six games in the closing weeks of the National League season. Perritt pitched ten major league seasons compiling a 92–78 record with a 2.89 ERA in 256 career major league games. Perritt's major league career ended after he had a financial dispute with the Detroit Tigers. A native of Arcadia, Louisiana, Perritt forged a successful career in the oil business in Louisiana and had encouraged his teammates to join him in the industry while still a player. In 1934, Perritt was injured when shot by a business associate during a fist fight that required police intervention.

The Greenwood franchise did not continue play in the 1913 Cotton States League, as Greenwood was replaced in the league by the Selma Cloverleafs franchise. The Cotton States League continued play for just the 1913 season before disbanding due to the onset of World War I.

=== 1921: Mississippi State League championship ===
In 1921, Greenwood, Mississippi resumed hosting minor league play when the Greenwood "Indians" became charter members of the four-team class D level Mississippi State League. Greenwood joined with the Clarksdale Cubs, Jackson Red Sox and Meridian Mets teams in beginning Mississippi State League play on April 25, 1921.

The Greenwood Indians won the Mississippi State League championship. The championship was won in a season that saw Greenwood end the regular season in second place in the overall league standings and win a pennant in the split season schedule. With a record of 59–49, the Indians finished 6½ games behind the first place Clarksdale Cubs in the overall standings. In the split season schedule, Clarksdale won the second half pennant after Greenwood had won the first half pennant, setting up the playoff between the two teams. Charles Bell managed Greenwood in 1921. In the playoff between the two split season champions, Greenwood defeated Clarksdale 5 games to 0 to win the Mississippi State League championship. During the league playoffs, Red Lucas threw a no-hitter in a shutout win for Greenwood over Clarksdale and their pitcher Earl Webb. Player/manager Charles Bell hit .328 on the season, playing in 100 games for the Indians. John Kane, who split the season between Greenwood and the Meridian Mets won the Cotton States League batting title, hitting .355. Greenwood pitcher Hugh Boyd compiled an 11–5 record to lead the league in winning percentage.

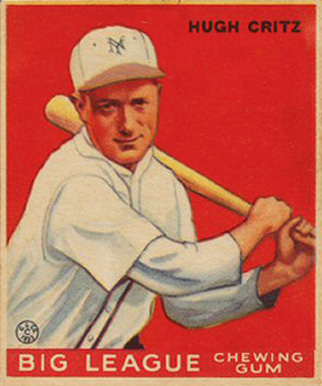
(1933) Hughie Critz, New York Giants. Goudey baseball card. A member of the Cincinnati Reds, Critz played for the 1921 Greenwood Indians in his first professional season. Critz became a businessman in Greenwood following his baseball career.

A member of the Cincinnati Reds Hall of Fame, Hughie Critz played for the Greenwood Indians in 1921 in his first professional season. A native of Starkville, Mississippi, Critz had attended college in Starkville at Mississippi A&M, today's Mississippi State University. His father, Professor Colonel Hugh Critz Sr., was a respected teacher at the college and was appointed president of Mississippi A&M in 1930. After the 1922 season Greenwood sold Critz contract to the Memphis Chickasaws for $2,000 and Critz agreed to the transaction after receiving half of the transaction price.

In the 1921 season, Critz batted .299 for Greenwood, playing in 101 games for the Indians at age 20. Critz made his major league debut with the 1924 Cincinnati Reds, a rookie season in which he hit .322 in 104 games with the Reds. Critz played in the World Series in 1933, as the starting second baseman with the champion New York Giants. Retiring on September 27, 1935, Critz ended his 12-season major league career, with a batting average of .268 with 38 home runs and 531 RBIs, playing in 1478 games. Critz had 97 career stolen bases, 832 runs scored, 195 doubles and 95 triples, with 1591 total hits in 5930 at bats. Defensively, Critz recorded a .974 fielding percentage while playing second base.

After his retirement from baseball, Critz returned to the area and resided on his 1,000-acre plantation located outside Greenwood, Mississippi. His former New York Giants manager Bill Terry wanted Critz to manage the Greenwood Giants, a Cotton States League team owned by Terry, but he turned down the managerial offer. Instead, Crits opened Hugh Critz Motor Co., a Ford-Lincoln dealership in Greenwood. In 1962, Critz died in Greenwood, Mississippi at the age 79.

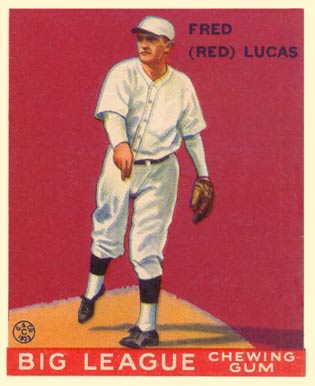
(1033) Red Lucas, Cincinnati Reds. Goudey baseball card. Lucas threw a no-hitter in the 1921 playoffs for Greenwood. Lucas is a member of the Cincinnati Reds Hall of Fame.

At age 19, Red Lucas pitched for Greenwood in 1921 and threw the no-hitter in the playoffs against Jackson. Lucas is a member of the Cincinnati Reds Hall of Fame and was a teammate with Hughie Critz in Cincinnati. Following the playoffs with Greenwood, Lucas finished the 1921 season pitching in 4 games for his hometown Nashville Volunteers of the Southern Association.After making his major league debut with the New York Giants in 1923, Lucas pitched through 1939, winning 157 career games with a 3.74 ERA. Lucas had 202 career complete games and led the National League in complete games in 1929, 1930 and 1932. On May 25, 1935, the day Babe Ruth hit his last three homers, Lucas started the game for the Pittsburgh Pirates against the Boston Braves and gave up Ruth's 712th career home run before being removed from the game.

A strong hitter, Lucas was used as a pinch hitter a total of 505 times in his career, batting .261 in those instances. His 114 total career pinch hits ranks among the top totals for pinch hitters in Major League Baseball history. His total is, by far, the most ever for a player whose primary position was pitcher. As a pitcher, Lucas batted seventh in the lineup for the Reds on September 7, 1933, and was the last Reds pitcher to bat higher than ninth until Jason Marquis batted eighth in May 2015. in hit major league career, Lucas posted a .281 batting average, hitting, 3 home runs with 190 RBI, He also scored 155 runs and drew 124 bases on balls in his major league career. Besides pitching, Lucas also started several games in both the infield and outfield during his career.

Following the completion of his major league career, Lucas managed in the minor leagues. He managed the 1941 Grand Rapids Colts of the Michigan State League and the 1942 Newport Canners of the Appalachian League. Lucas was a player/coach for the Nashville Vols in both the 1944 and 1945 season. He next managed the Lumberton Cubs of the Tobacco State League in 1947. In 1948, Lucas was the manager of the Decatur Commies of the Illinois-Indiana-Iowa League before returning to Lumberton as manager in 1949, his final season in professional baseball.

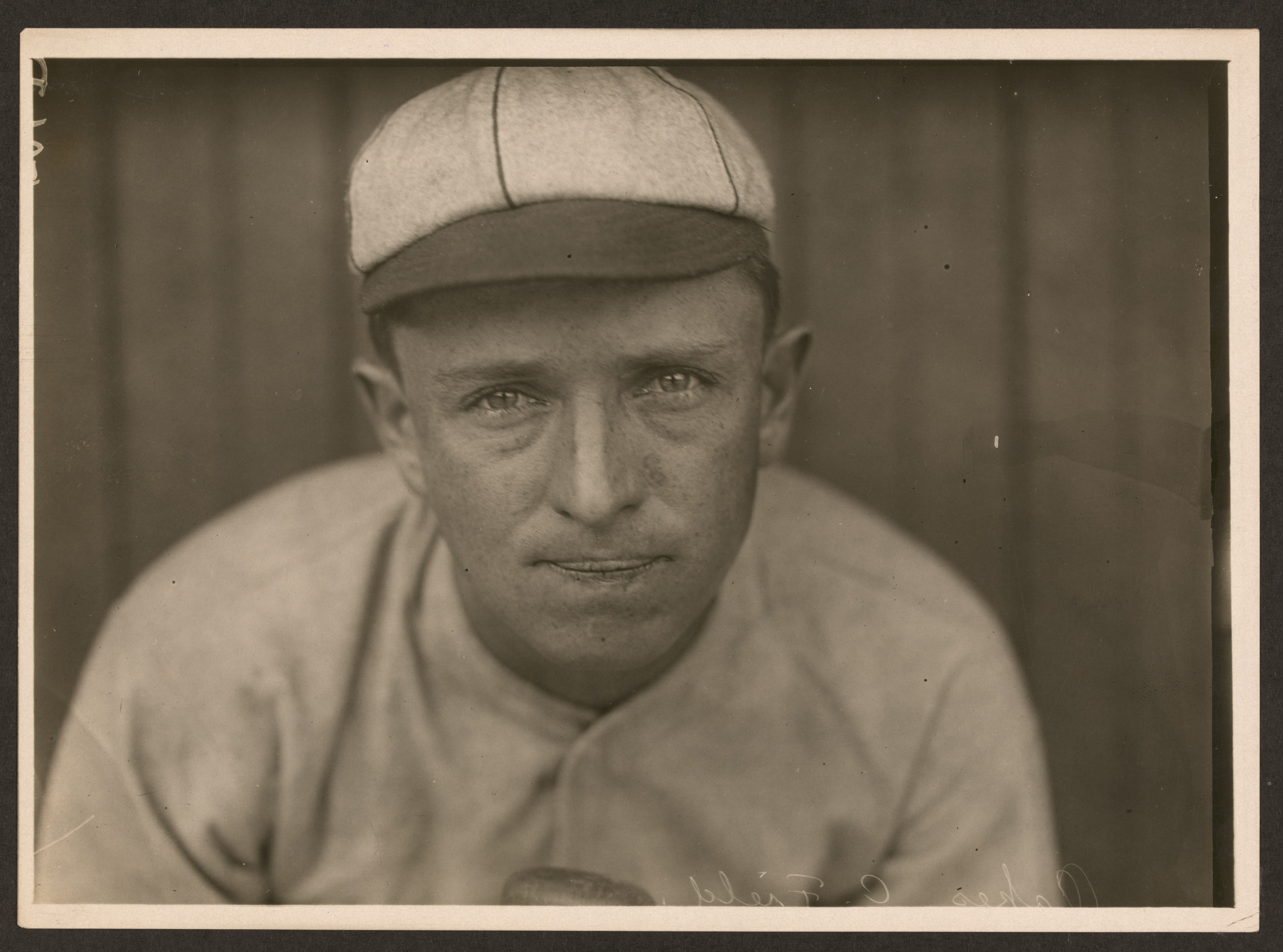
(1910) Rebel Oakes, St. Louis Cardinals. Oakes played for Greenwood in 1921, his final professional season. In 1914 and 1915, Oakes was the namesake player-manager for the Pittsburgh Rebels in the Federal League.

Rebel Oakes played for Greenwood in 1921, in his final professional baseball season. Oakes had begun his career with the 1905 Greenville Cotton Pickers in the Cotton States League after attending the Louisiana Industrial Institute, today's Louisiana Tech University. Oakes his major league debut in 1909 with Cincinnati Reds. In 1910, Oakes was traded by the Reds to the St. Louis Cardinals and became the Cardinals' starting center fielder. After playing four seasons with St. Louis, Oakes decided to play with the newly formed Federal League when the rival league was founded in 1914. Oakes became the player-manager for the Pittsburgh Rebels, and the "Rebels" were Oakes' namesake. After the Federal League folded following the 1915 season, Oakes never returned to major league baseball, as he was essentially blacklisted by teams for his role in the Federal League despite his desire to continue playing. In 1918, Oakes became the player-manager of the Denver Bears, where he played for two seasons.

With money earned from an oil career, Oakes attempted to purchase the Pittsburgh Pirates major league franchise in 1920, a pursuit which proved unsuccessful. In the winter of 1920–1921, Oakes next pursued purchasing the Boston Braves, Philadelphia Phillies and St. Louis Cardinals franchises and was unsuccessful in all three pursuits. In the spring of 1921, Oakes served as the player-manager of the Jackson Red Sox of the Mississippi State League play before joining Greenwood before the year ended, playing in his final minor league season. Following his baseball career, Oakes continued his career in the oil industry, His business dealings in the volatile oil industry Oakes "broke" at the time of his death at age 64 in 1948.

The Mississippi State League permanently folded following Greenwood's playoff victory and the completion of the 1921 season. In 1922, all four Mississippi State League franchises became members of the Cotton States League, which was reformed for the first time since folding following the 1913 season.

=== 1922 & 1923: Cotton States League return ===
When the Cotton States League reformed for the 1922 season, the Greenwood Indians continued play the six–team Class D level league, winning a championship for the second consecutive season. The Greenville Bucks and Vicksburg Hill Billies teams joined the Mississippi State League holdover Clarksdale Cubs, Greenwood Indians, Jackson Red Sox and Meridian Mets teams in forming the new Cotton States League. The reformed Cotton States League began play on April 20, 1922.

With a record of 73–40, Greenwood finished in first place in the Cotton States League overall regular season standings. The Cotton States League played a split season schedule in 1922. Charles Bell returned as the Greenwood manager and led the team to another league championship. In the overall standings Greenwood finished just ½ game ahead of the Meridian Mets (72–40) in the overall standings. Meridian won the first half pennant of the split season schedule and Greenwood won the second half pennant, setting up the two teams to meet in the playoffs. In the playoff final, Greenwood swept Meridian in four games to capture the Cotton States League championship. Greenville player/manager Charles Bell hit .278 with 17 doubles and 15 triples, playing in 111 games for Greenwood. Bell stayed in the league and became the manager of the Jackson Senators in 1923, his final professional baseball season.

In 1923, the Greenwood Indians continued play as the Cotton States League expanded to become an eight–team Class D level league. The Cotton States League expanded from a six-team league to an eight-team league in for the 1923 season, adding franchises from Hattiesburg, Mississippi and Laurel, Mississippi as the expansion teams. The Hattiesburg Hubman and Laurel Lumberjacks, joined the returning Clarksdale Cubs, Greenville Swamp Angels, Jackson Senators, Meridian Mets and Vicksburg Hill Billies teams and joined with Greenwood in beginning league play on April 18, 1923.

With consecutive championships, the prior two seasons, the 1923 Greenwood Indians finished in second place as the eight-team Cotton States League played a shortened season, folding before the season schedule was completed. On July 24, 1923, the Cotton States League stopped play for the season. With a record of 43–35 at the time the league folded, Greenwood finished in a virtual tie for second place in the eight–team league. Greenwood ended the season 1½ games behind the first place Greenville Swamp Angels and the Laurel Lumberjacks had the identical record as Greenwood. The Indians were managed during their final season by Tom Toland. Jake Propst of Greenwood led the Cotton States League with 75 runs scored, tying with his teammate William Waldron. Waldron who also led the league with both 4 home runs and 141 total hits. Their teammate, Greenwood pitcher Hugh Boyd won 24 games to lead the Cotton States League.

Following his two seasons with Greenwood in 1922 and 1923, William Bobo continued his baseball career while simultaneously coaching in college. In 1924, Bobo was hired to serve as the player/manager for the Hattiesburg Pinetoppers in the Cotton States League. Bobo had coached the Hattiesburg High School football team to an 8–1–1 record in 1922 after playing the season with Greenwood. In September 1924, Bobo was named as the athletic director at Mississippi State Teachers College, today's University of Southern Mississippi), which was located in Hattiesburg. Bobo was the Mississippi State Teachers College football coach from 1924 to 1927, compiling a record of 9–17–4. Bobo was also the head basketball coach at Mississippi State Teachers College, coaching the team from 1924 to 1928, with an overall record of 31–17–1. For his third coaching position, Bobo served as and the Mississippi State Teachers College head baseball coach from 1925 to 1928 and compiled a record of 19–10–1 in his tenure.

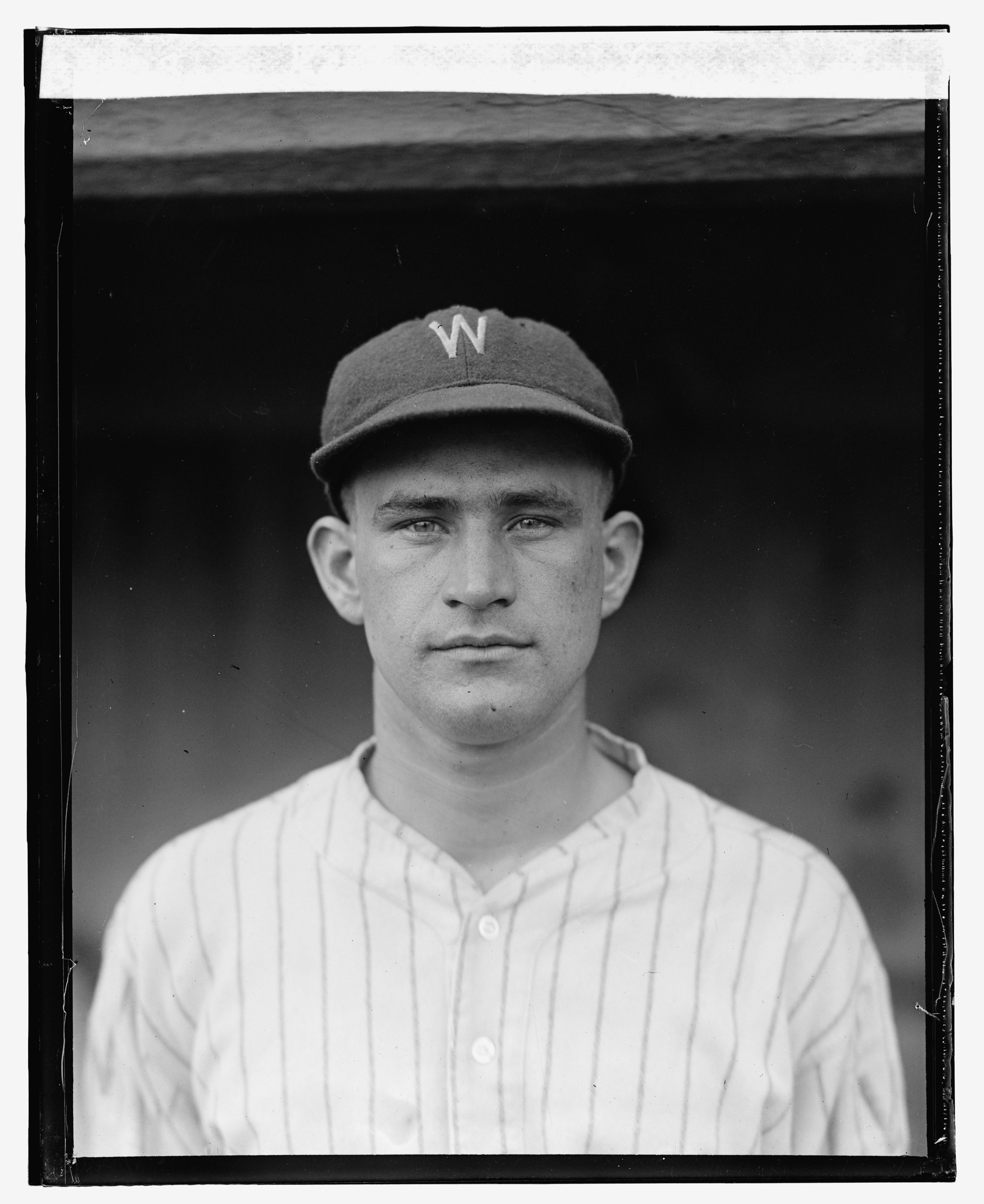
(1925) Harry Kelley, Washington Senators. At age 17, Kelley pitched for Greenwood in 1923, compiling a record of 12–9.

In his first professional season at age 17, Harry Kelley pitched for Greenwood in 1923, compiling a 12–9 record. Kelley then pitched for the Memphis Chickasaws in 1924. Beginning in 1925, Kelley pitched in the major leagues thorough 1926 and again from 1936 to 1939 for the Washington Senators and Philadelphia Athletics.

Greenwood's 1923 manager Tom Toland had played with the Indians in both 1921 and 1922 (hitting .329 and .286) and had briefly managed the Clarkdale Cubs in 1922. While serving as the manager, Toland was also the president of the Greenwood franchise, and he resumed that role with the future Greenwood minor league teams until his death in Greenwood on April 18, 1937.

Despite folding the season before, the Cotton States League resumed play in 1924, playing as a six–team Class D level league, but without a Greenwood franchise. The Clarksdale, Greenville and Meridian franchises also folded from the league. The new Brookhaven Truckers and Monroe Drillers teams joined the returning Hattiesburg Hubman, Jackson Senators, Laurel Lumberjacks and Vicksburg Hill Billies franchises in the six–team 1923 Cotton States League.

Following the folding of the Indians, Greenwood, Mississippi was without a minor league team for ten seasons. In 1934, minor league play resumed when the Greenwood Chiefs team was formed and began a two-seasons of play as charter members of the Class D level East Dixie League. The Greenwood Giants then rejoined the 1936 Cotton States League, beginning another tenure of Greenwood teams in the league.

== The ballpark ==
The Greenwood minor league teams hosted home games at Wright Park in Greenwood. C.E. Wright was a local businessman in the era in Greenwood. He was the owner of the C. E. Wright Ice & Coal Company in the era.

== Timeline ==
Year(s)	# Yrs.	Team	Level	League	Ballpark
1910–1912	3	Greenwood Scouts	Class D	Cotton States League	Wright Park
1921	1	Greenwood Indians	Class D	Mississippi State League	Wright Park
1922–1923	2	Greenwood Indians	Class D	Cotton States League	Wright Park

== Year–by–year records ==
Year	Record	Finish	Manager	Playoffs
1910	71–36	1st	Woody Thornton	League champions
1911	46–68	5th	Woody Thornton / Orth Collins	No playoffs held
1912	51–64	3rd	Orth Collins / Martin Dudley	League champions Declared after Vicksburg folded
1921	59–49	2nd	Charles Bell	Won first half pennant League champions
1922	73–40	1st	Charles Bell	Won second half pennant League champions
1923	43–35	2nd (t)	Tom Toland	League disbanded July 24

== Notable alumni ==
- Herschel Bobo (1922–1923)
- Scoops Carey (1911)
- Orth Collins (1910; 1911–1912, MGR)
- Hughie Critz (1921) Cincinnati Reds Hall of Fame
- Ed Irwin (1911)
- John Kane (1921)
- Harry Kelley (1923)
- Horace Leverette (1911)
- Red Lucas (1921) Cincinnati Reds Hall of Fame
- Rebel Oakes (1921)
- Pat McGehee (1911–1912)
- Herbert Murphy (1912)
- Pol Perritt (1912)
- Ray Rolling (1910–1912)
- Sherry Smith (1911)
- Ollie Welf (1910–1911)

== See also ==
- Greenwood Scouts players
- Greenwood Indians players
- Greenwood Chauffeurs players
