= Mississippi State League =

- Classification: Class D (1921)
- Sport: Minor League Baseball
- First season: 1921
- Folded: 1921
- Replaced by: Cotton States League
- President: John G Dailey (1921)
- No. of teams: 4
- Country: United States of America
- Most titles: 1 Clarksdale Cubs (1921)

The Mississippi State League was a professional, Class D level minor baseball league that played in the 1921 season. The league consisted of teams based exclusively in Mississippi.

== History ==
The Mississippi State League began play in 1921. It featured four teams: the Clarksdale Cubs of Clarksdale, Mississippi, the Greenwood Indians of Greenwood, Mississippi, the Jackson Red Sox of Jackson, Mississippi and the Meridian Mets of Meridian, Mississippi.

The Cubs finished in first place in the league's regular season. Greenwood beat them in the postseason, five games to none to claim the championship. Meridian finished in third place, while Jackson finished in last.

Multiple future and former major leaguers played in the league, including Hughie Critz, Happy Foreman, Red Lucas, Red McDermott, Rebel Oakes (who also managed Jackson) and Earl Webb.

The league folded after 1921. All four cities had teams in the Cotton States League the following year.

== Cities represented ==
- Clarksdale, MS: Clarksdale Cubs 1921
- Greenwood, MS: Greenwood Indians 1921
- Jackson, MS: Jackson Red Sox 1921
- Meridian, MS: Meridian Mets 1921

== Standings & statistics ==
=== 1921 Mississippi State League ===
schedule

| Team standings | W | L | PCT | GB | Managers |
|---|---|---|---|---|---|
| Clarksdale Cubs | 65 | 44 | .596 | -- | Baxter Sparks |
| Greenwood Indians | 59 | 49 | .546 | 5½ | Charles Bell |
| Meridian Mets | 45 | 60 | .429 | 18 | C. Reflogal / Ollie Mills |
| Jackson Red Sox | 45 | 61 | .425 | 18½ | Rebel Oakes |

Playoff: Greenwood 5 games, Clarksdale 0.

Player statistics
| Player | Team | Stat | Tot | Player | Team | Stat | Tot |
|---|---|---|---|---|---|---|---|
| John Kane | Greenwood/Mer | BA | .355 | Hal Goldsmith | Clarksdale | W | 16 |
| Ben Allen | Meridian | Runs | 121 | Frank Albernese | Jackson | SO | 128 |
| Ben Allen | Meridian | Hits | 124 | Hugh Boyd | Greenwood | Pct | .688; 11-5 |
