= Hattiesburg Pinetoppers =

Former minor league baseball team

- 1926–1929; (1904–1905, 1910–1912, 1923–1929); Hattiesburg, Mississippi

Minor league affiliations
- Class: Class D (1904–1905, 1910–1912, 1923–1929)
- League: Delta League (1904); Cotton States League (1905, 1910–1912, 1923–1929)

Major league affiliations
- Team: None

Minor league titles
- League titles (2): 1924; 1926
- Conference titles (3): 1924; 1926; 1928

Team data
- Name: Hattiesburg (1904); Hattiesburg Tar Heels (1905); Hattiesburg Timberjacks (1910); Hattiesburg Woodpeckers (1911); Hattiesburg Timberjacks (1912); Hattiesburg Hubman (1923–1924); Hattiesburg Hubbers (1925); Hattiesburg Pinetoppers (1926–1929)
- Ballpark: Kamper Park (1904–1905, 1910–1912, 1923–1929)

The Hattiesburg Pinetoppers were a minor league baseball team based in Hattiesburg, Mississippi. Between 1905 and 1929, the "Pinetoppers" and other Hattiesburg teams played as members of the Class D level Cotton States League, winning league championships in 1924 and 1926.

Hattiesburg first hosted minor league baseball in 1904, playing the season in the four-team Class D level Delta League.

The Hattiesburg Cotton States Leagues teams hosted home minor league games at Kamper Park. Still in use today as a public park, Kamper Park hosts the Hattiesburg Zoo.

== History ==
=== 1904: Delta League ===
The 1904 "Hattiesburg" team was the first minor league team based in Hattiesburg, playing the 1904 season as charter members of the Class D level Delta League. The Delta League began the season with four charter teams, as the Brookhaven, MS (Brookhaven), Clarksdale, MS (Clarksdale), Jackson Senators and the Yazoo City Zoos began league play. One week into the season, on May 16, 1904, the league expanded to six teams, with two new teams from Canton, MS ("Canton") and Hattiesburg, MS ("Hattiesburg") joining the league.

In their first season of play, the "Hattiesburg" team finished in fifth place when the season ended on September 3, 1904. The Hattiesburg manager was Conrad Best. The final Delta League standings were led by the first place Clarksdale team, who ended the season with a record of 67–31, finishing 32.5 games ahead of fifth place Hattiesburg who ended the season with record of 36–49. Second place in the standings was Yazoo City (62–34), who were followed by Canton (43–45), the Jackson Senators (47–53), and last place Brookhaven (27–70) in the six–team league. The league did not have playoffs in 1904.

The Delta League permanently folded after playing their only season in 1904.

=== 1905: Cotton States League ===
After the folding of the Delta League following the 1904 season, Hattiesburg joined a new league in 1905. Hattiesburg continued minor league play in 1905, now known as the "Tar Heels" and became new members of the Class D level Cotton States League. In 1905, the Cotton States League expanded from a six-team league to an eight-team league by adding the Hattiesburg and Meridian, Mississippi, franchises as expansion teams. Hattiesburg joined the Baton Rouge Cajuns, Greenville Cotton Pickers, Jackson Senators, Meridian White Ribbons, Natchez Indians, Pine Bluff Lumbermen and Vicksburg Hill Climbers teams in beginning Cotton State League play on April 20, 1905.

The 1905 Cotton States League season was shortened due to the Yellow Fever epidemic. On July 31, 1905, the eight–team Cotton States League stopped play with the approval of the National Association, which governed minor league teams and leagues in the era. The Hattiesburg Tar Heels turned their daily operation of the team over to the league on July 8, 1905, and the team was folded by the league just before the end of the season, on July 17, 1905. In the final standings, Harrisburg was credited with a record of 21–46. Despite not finishing the season, Hattiesburg was placed in seventh place with their record, finishing 25.5 games behind first place Greenville Cotton Pickers in the final standings at the end of the shortened season. The Hattiesburg managers in their first Cotton State League season were the returning Conrad Best and Perry Werden. The Hattiesburg franchise did not return to the 1906 Cotton States League, as the league reduced two teams to become a six team league, also dropping the Pine Bluff Lumbermen franchise.

Hattiesburg manager Perry Werden was both a pitcher and hitter for seven seasons in the early major leagues. Werden also had a lengthy and record setting minor league career, retiring with a career .341 batting average. Werden hit .417 with 42 home runs with the 1894 Minneapolis Millers, followed by hitting .428 with 45 home runs for the Millers in 1895. His home run totals were professional baseball records at the time. As a player/manager for Hattiesburg at age 43, Warden hit .328. It was his final stint as a minor league manager. He played a final season for the Vicksburg Hill Billies in 1906. Werden started working as a minor league umpire in 1907, continuing through 1921.

=== 1910 to 1912: Second Cotton States League tenure ===
After a four absence, Hattiesburg returned to minor league play in 1910. The Hattiesburg "Timberjacks" became members of the six-team, Class D level Cotton States League, which was reforming after not playing the 1909 season. Hattiesburg joined the Greenwood Scouts, Jackson Tigers, Meridian White Ribbons, Vicksburg Hill Billies and Yazoo City Zoos teams in beginning league play on May 2, 1910.

Rejoining the Cotton States League, the 1910 Hattiesburg "Timberjacks" placed third in the six-team league, playing the season under their 32-year-old player/manager Link Stickney. With a 50–60 record, Hattiesburg finished 22.5 games behind the first place Greenwood Scouts in the final standings. The league did not have a playoff format in 1910.

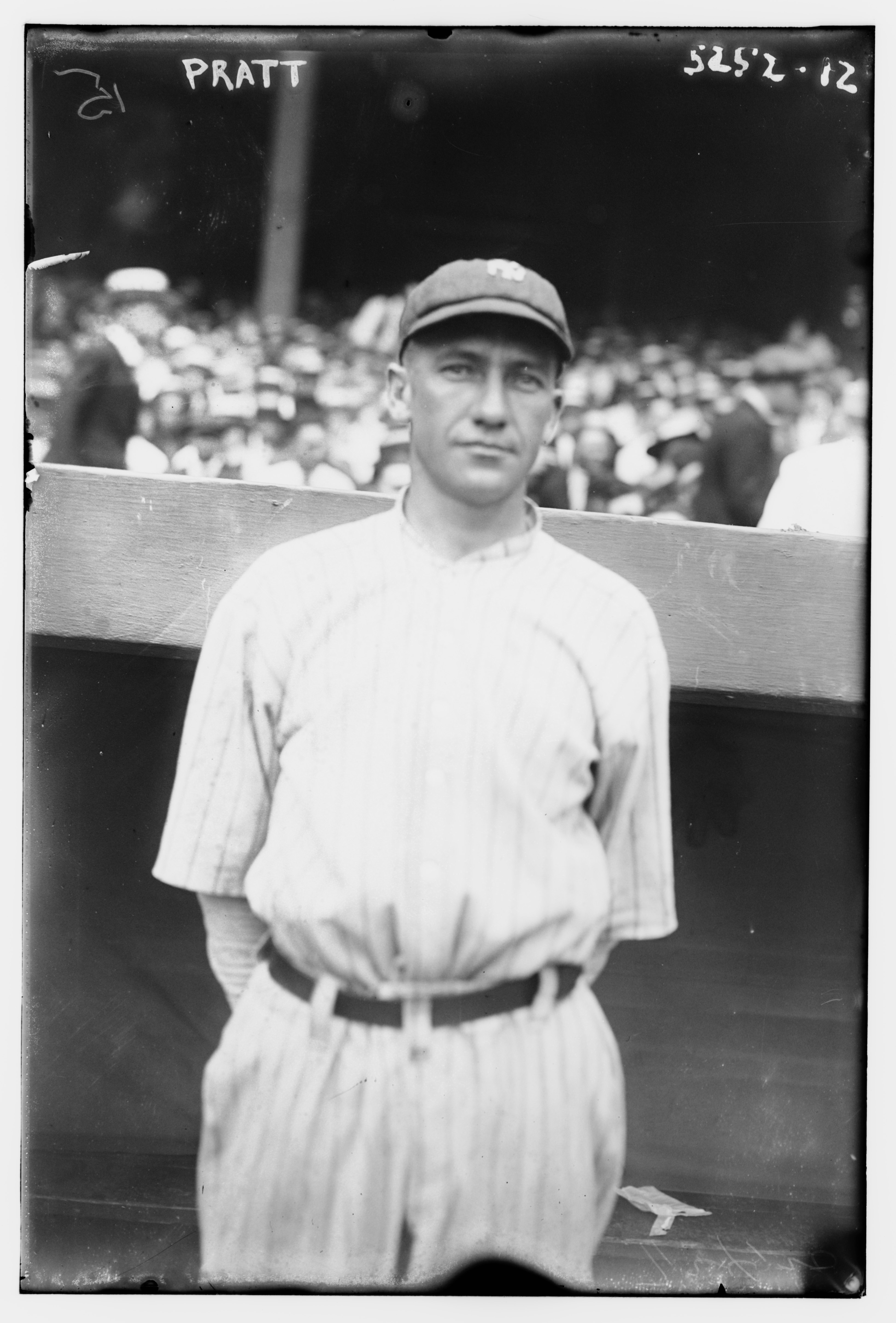
(1922) Del Pratt, New York Yankees. Pratt batted .367 with Hattiesburg in 1910.

Del Pratt played for the 1910 Hattiesburg Timberjacks. Pratt later advanced to the major leagues, where he played 13 seasons with career totals of 987 RBI, a .292 batting average and 45.7 WAR. As a rookie with the 1912 St. Louis Browns, he batted .302 for the season. Pratt led the American League with 103 RBI in 1916. Pratt later became the baseball coach at University of Michigan baseball coach, following Carl Lundgren after being recommended for the position by Branch Rickey. Pratt also served as an assistant football coach and freshman basketball coach at the University of Michigan. Pratt batted .367 while playing for Hattiesburg in 1910.

The Hattiesburg "Woodpeckers" team continued play in 1911 Cotton States League, finishing as the runner-up in the final standings of six-team Class D level league. With a 65–51 record, the Woodpeckers placed second under returning manager Link Stickney, finishing 8.5 games behind the first place Vicksburg Hill Billies in the six–team league. No league playoffs were held

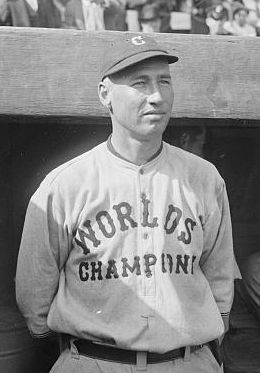
(1921) Jim Bagby Sr., Cleveland Indians Bagby won 22 games for Hattiesburg in 1911. He won 31 games for 1920 World Series Champion Cleveland.

Carlos Smith of Hattiesburg hit over .400 on the 1911 Cotton States League season, winning the league batting championship with an average of .401. Playing in 102 games at age 32, Smith totaled 137 hits in 342 at bats, adding 36 doubles and 9 home runs on the season. Hattiesburg's Guy Tutwiler hit 11 home runs to lead the league and his 87 runs scored were the most in the league. Pitcher Jim Bagby of Hattiesburg led the Cotton States League with 22 victories.

A member of the Cleveland Guardians Hall of Fame, Jim Bagby pitched for Hattiesburg in both the 1910 and 1911 seasons. Bagby made his major league debut with the Cincinnati Reds in 1912 after his successful 1911 season with Hattiesburg. Bagby later became the first pitcher to hit a home run in the World Series, which occurred in Game 5 the 1920 World Series. Bagby is one of the last pitchers to win over 30 games in one season, compiling a 31–12 record in 1920, when he pitched 339 innings. Arm injuries after his 1920 season diminished his pitching successes and he retired following the 1923 season. Following his major league playing career Bagby became a minor league umpire before a stroke during a game in 1942 ended his umpiring career. His son Jim Bagby Jr. became an all-star pitcher for the Cleveland Indians. Bagby and his son became the first father-and-son combination to pitch in the World Series. Jim Jr. pitched in the 1946 World Series for the Boston Red Sox

The 1912 Hattiesburg "Timberjacks" began the season as continuing play as members of the Cotton States League, before the franchise relocated during the season. On June 5, 1912, Hattiesburg had compiled a 19–24 record when the team moved to Columbus, Mississippi, and finished the season playing as the Columbus Joy Riders. After compiling a record of 37–35 while based in Columbus, the team finished the season in fourth place with an overall record of 56–59. Carlos Smith managed the team, which finished 9.5 games behind the first place Vicksburg Hill Billies.

Hattiesburg/Columbus player/manager Carlos Smith won his second consecutive Cotton States League batting title in 1912, hitting .348. His player/teammate W.J. Blanchfield led the Cotton States League with both 116 runs scored and 140 total hits. The 1913 Cotton States League continued play with Columbus and without a Hattiesburg franchise.

=== 1923 to 1929: Two Cotton States League championships ===
After ten seasons without a team, Hattiesburg, Mississippi resumed hosting minor league baseball in 1923, when the Hattiesburg "Hubman" became members of the eight–team Class D level Cotton States League. The Clarksdale Cubs, Greenville Swamp Angels, Greenwood Indians, Laurel Lumberjacks, Jackson Senators, Meridian Mets and Vicksburg Hill Billies teams joined with Hattiesburg in beginning league play on April 18, 1923. The Cotton States League expanded from a six-team leagueto an eight-team league in for the 1923 season, adding the Hattiesburg and Laurel teams as expansion teams.

The "Hubman" nickname corresponds with Hattiesburg being nicknamed as "The Hub City" due to the city's growth after the lumber industry and corresponding railroad industry led to it being a hub for business.

The Hattiesburg "Hubman" finished in last place in the 1923 Cotton States League, as the league played a shortened season. On July 24, 1923, the Cotton States League stopped play for the season. With a record of 31–46 at the time the league folded, Hattiesburg finished in eighth place in the eight–team league, ending the season 12.5 games behind the first place Greenville Swamp Angels. They were managed during the season by Red Torkelson and Fred Smith.

Despite folding the season before the Cotton States League resumed play in 1924, playing as a six–team Class D level league. The Hattiesburg Hubman joined the Brookhaven Truckers, Jackson Senators, Laurel Lumberjacks, Monroe Drillers and Vicksburg Hill Billies teams in resuming league play on May 8, 1924.

Having played with the Paducah Indians in 1923, William "Herschel" Bobo, was hired to serve as the player/manager for Hattiesburg in 1924 at age 27. Bobo had ties to Hattiesburg, having coached the Hattiesburg High School football team to an 8–1–1 record in 1922. In 1924, Hobo began a five-year tenure as the player/manager for Hattiesburg by leading the team to the first of two Cotton States League championships. A native of Clarksdale, Mississippi, Bobo began simultaneously coaching three college sports teams in 1924, in addition to his minor league baseball player/manager responsibilities.

In September 1924, Bobo was named as the athletic director at Mississippi State Teachers College (known today as the University of Southern Mississippi), located in Hattiesburg. He then began coaching three sports at the college in addition to his role as a minor league player/manager. Bobo served as the football coach from 1924 to 1927, compiling a record of 9–17–4. In his first game as football coach, on October 4, 1924, Mississippi State Teachers College defeated Clarke Memorial College 27-0 . In the same period, Bobo was also the head basketball coach at Mississippi State Teachers College. He coached basketball from 1924 to 1928, compiling a final record of 31–17–1. For his third coaching position, Bobo served as and the Mississippi State Teachers College head baseball coach from 1925 to 1928, compiling a record of 19–10–1 in his tenure.

The Hattiesburg Hubman won the 1924 Cotton States League championship, as the league reduced to six teams for the season. The Hubman ended the season with an overall record of 64–33, placing first in the final regular season standings of the Class D level league. Managed by Herschel Bobo, who began his five-year tenure as manager, Hattiesburg ended the season 5.5 games ahead of the second place Monroe Drillers in the final Cotton States League final standings. The league played a split season schedule, but no playoffs were held as the Hattiesburg Hubman won both halves of the season schedule. Player/manager Herschel Bobo led the Cotton States League with 91 runs scored and also batted hit .317 in 98 games for Hattiesburg. Charles "Hoot" Gibson of Hattiesburg led the league with 141 total hits. Hattiesburg pitcher Buddy Williamson led the Cotton States with 21 wins, compiling a 21–5 record on the season.

The 1925 Hattiesburg "Hubbers" continued play in the eight-team Cotton States League and defended their league championship with a second-place finish. Hattiesburg Pinetoppers ended the season with a record of 59–61 to place fifth in the league standings, playing under returning manager Herschel Bobo. The Hattiesburg Hubbers finished just 0.5 games behind the first place Meridian White Ribbons in the final Cotton States League final standings. The league played a split season schedule, and Hattiesburg did not qualify for the play playoffs as the Jackson Senators won the first hald and Meridian won the second half before being swept by Jackson in the final. Player/manager Herschel Bobo batted led the Cotton States League with 17 home rund while also batting .315 in 113 games for Hattiesburg. Hoot Gibson of Hattiesburg won the Cotton States League batting title hitting .351 with a league leading 164 total hits. Gene Poland of Hattiesburg scored 90 runs, most in the Cotton States League.

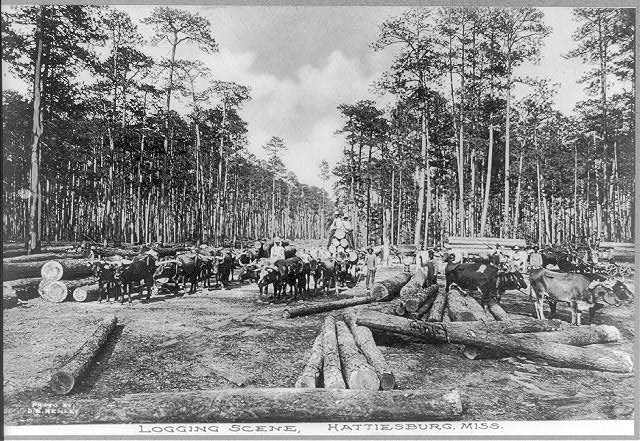
(1920) Logging scene, Hattiesburg, Mississippi. The logging and corresponding railroad industry in Hattiesburg in the era corresponds with the "Hubman" and "Pinetoppers" and related team nicknames.

Hattiesburg continued play in the 1926 Cotton States League, now known as the "Pinetoppers" and the newly nicknamed team won the league championship.

The Hattiesburg "Pinetoppers" nickname corresponds with local geography and industry. Hattiesburg, Mississippi is known for being a "Hub" for both railroad and forestry, which led to the "Hub City" nickname. The Hattiesburg region is known for its forest land, and Mississippi has 19/3 million acres of timberland. In the era, Hattiesburg was a major center of the lumber industry in the late 19th and early 20th centuries. The city's sawmills processed pine trees from the surrounding forests.

Led by returning manager Herschel Bobo, the Pinetoppers ended the 1926 season with a record of 77–46 to place first in the overall league standings, finishing 10.5 games ahead of the second Meridian White Ribbons. With the Cotton States League utilizing a split season schedule, Hattiesburg won the first half pennant and The Vicksburg Hill Billies, who finished seventh in the overall standings, won the second half pennant. No playoff final was held due to second half "irregularities." Player/manager Herschel Bobo hit .318 in 112 games while managing the team to the league championship. Hattiesburg teammates Hoot Gibson and Sammy Mack each scored 98 runs, most in the Cotton States League. Sammy Vick began the 1926 season as player manager of the Laurel Lumberjacks and was replaced mid-season and played for Hattiesburg for the remainder of the season, winning the league batting title, hitting .376 overall.

Roy Spruell had a 22–7 record as a pitcher for Hattiesburg in 1926. On Friday, August 13, he threw a no-hitter against the Monroe Drillers, Spruell had no walks in the game, but player/manager Herschel Bobo had two errors playing shortstop. With two double plays, Spruell faced the minimum of 27 batters.

As defending champions, the 1927 Hattiesburg Pinetoppers continued play in the eight-team, Class D level Cotton States League finishing in third place. With a record of 66–52 in the final overall standings, the Pinetoppers played the season under returning manager Herschel Bobo. With their third-place finish in the eight–team league, Hattiesburg finished 6.5 games behind the first place Jackson Red Sox and did not qualify for the playoffs. The Monroe Drillers won the first half championship of the split season schedule and Jackson won the second. Jackson then swept Monroe in the final to win the championship. Herschel Bobo hit .333 in 120 games as the player/manager for Hattiesburg. Charlse "Hoot" Gibson of Hattiesburg led the Cotton States League with 12 home runs and also won the league batting title, hitting .358. Gibson played four seasons with Hattiesburg and batted .339 in 469 games for the franchise.

A Hattiesburg native and noted football and baseball player for Herschel Bobo at Mississippi State Teacher College, Nollie Felts played for the 1927 Hattiesburg Pinetoppers. Due to amateur guidelines in the era, Felts later lost his collegiate football eligibility due to his season with the Pinetoppers. Felts was an all-American football player at the collegiate level. Felts was inducted into the Southern Mississippi University Hall of Fame in 1965.

In their final season under player/manager Herschel Bobo, the 1928 Hattiesburg Pinetoppers reached the final of the Cotton States League. Hattiesburg placed third in the overall the regular season standings with a 66–52. The Pinetoppers ended the season 9.0 games behind the first place Jackson Red Sox in the final overall standings. Jackson did not qualify for the playoff. In the split season schedule, Hattiesburg won the first half pennant, and the Vicksburg Hill Billies won the second. Vicksburg then defeated the Pinetoppers in the playoff final, 4 games to 3. In his final season with Hattiesburg, Herschel Bobo hit .333 in 114 games in at age 31.

In 1929, Herschel Bobo left Hattiesburg and stayed in the Cotton States League, beginning a tenure as the player/manager of the Jackson Senators. In their final season of Cotton States League membership, the 1929 Hattiesburg Pinetoppers relocated during the season. On May 20, 1929, with a record of 15–19, the Hattiesburg franchise moved to Baton Rouge, Louisiana, playing as the Baton Rouge Essos for the remainder of the 1929 season. The Hattiesburg/Baton Rouge team placed fourth in the eight–team league after the team compiled a 42–42 record while based no Baton Rouge. Playing the season under managers Dee Cousineau and Bill Pierre, the team finished with an overall record of 57–61 in the regular season record. The Essos finished 14.0 games behind the first place Alexandria Reds. In the playoff final, the El Dorado Lions defeated the Jackson Senators.

The Hattiesburg Pinetoppers did not return to the 1930 Cotton States League, as the franchise permanently folded following the 1929 season. Hattiesburg, Mississippi has not hosted another minor league team.

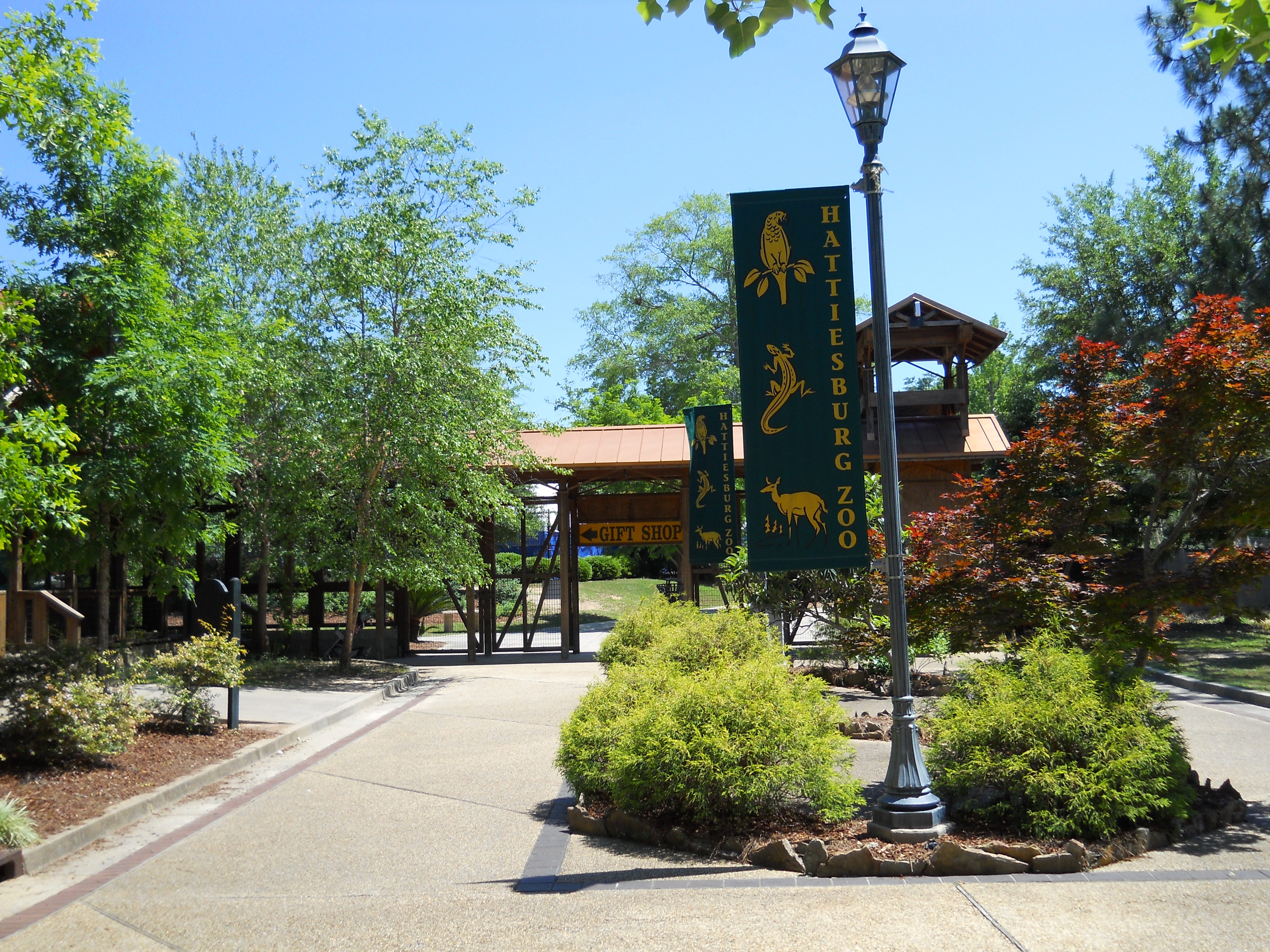
(2011) Entrance to Hattiesburg Zoo. The Zoo is located within Kamper Park. The park parcel contained the former minor league ballfield for the Hattiesburg teams.

== The ballpark ==
The Hattiesburg minor league teams hosted Cotton States League home games at Kamper Park.

In 1902, the 40-acre parcel was donated in 1902 by the park's namesake John Kamper to the Daughters of the Confederacy. It would officially become a public park in 1908. In 1903, work began at the site to transform the land into a park. The Hattiesburg Zoo was opened on a 12-acre portion park in 1950. The ballpark site is still in use today as a public park with the Hattiesburg Zoo, baseball fields and other amenities within the park.

Today, Kamper Park is located at 107 South 17th Avenue in Hattiesburg, Mississippi.

== Timeline ==
| Year(s) | # Yrs. | Team | Level | League | Ballpark |
|---|---|---|---|---|---|
| 1904 | 1 | Hattiesburg | Class D | Delta League | Kamper Park |
| 1905 | 1 | Hattiesburg Tar Heels | Class D | Cotton States League | Kamper Park |
| 1910 | 1 | Hattiesburg Timberjacks | Class D | Cotton States League | Kamper Park |
| 1911 | 1 | Hattiesburg Woodpeckers | Class D | Cotton States League | Kamper Park |
| 1912 | 1 | Hattiesburg Timberjacks | Class D | Cotton States League | Kamper Park |
| 1923–1924 | 2 | Hattiesburg Hubman | Class D | Cotton States League | Kamper Park |
| 1925 | 1 | Hattiesburg Hubbers | Class D | Cotton States League | Kamper Park |
| 1926–1929 | 4 | Hattiesburg Pinetoppers | Class D | Cotton States League | Kamper Park |

== Year-by-year records ==
| Year | Record | Finish | Manager | Playoffs/Notes |
|---|---|---|---|---|
| 1904 | 36–49 | 5th | Conrad Best | Joined league May 16 |
| 1905 | 21–46 | 7th | Conrad Best / Perry Werden | Hattiesburg and Pine Bluff folded July 17; League stopped play July 31 |
| 1910 | 50–60 | 3rd | Link Stickney | No playoffs held |
| 1911 | 65–51 | 2nd | Link Stickney | No playoffs held |
| 1912 | 56–59 | 2nd | Carlos Smith | Team (19–24) moved to Columbus June 5 No playoffs held |
| 1923 | 31–45 | 8th | Red Torkelson / Fred Smith | League disbanded July 24 |
| 1924 | 64–33 | 1st | Herschel Bobo | League champions No playoffs held |
| 1925 | 70–53 | 2nd | Herschel Bobo | Did not qualify |
| 1926 | 77–46 | 1st | Herschel Bobo | League champions No playoffs held |
| 1927 | 68–52 | 3rd | Herschel Bobo | Did not qualify |
| 1928 | 66–52 | 3rd | Herschel Bobo | Lost League Finals |
| 1929 | 57–61 | 4th | Dee Cousineau / Bill Pierre | Team (15–19) moved to Baton Rouge May 30; Did not qualify |

== Notable alumni ==
- Jim Bagby Sr. (1910–1911) Cleveland Guardians Hall of Fame
- Ernie Baker (1905)
- Herschel Bobo (1924–1928, MGR)
- Dee Cousineau (1929, MGR)
- Walton Cruise (1911)
- Spoke Emery (1927)
- Nollie Felts (1927)
- Charlie Hamburg (1904)
- Horace Leverette (1910)
- Bill Lewis (1924)
- Gene Madden (1911)
- Rebel Oakes (1904–1905)
- Del Pratt (1910) AL RBI leader
- Phil Redding (1911–1912)
- Jack Ryan (1905)
- George Stumpf (1929)
- Fred Smith (1924, MGR)
- Guy Tutwiler (1910–1911)
- Perry Werden (1905, MGR)
- Ollie Welf (1912)
- Jack Wentz (1904)

== See also ==
- Hattiesburg Pinetoppers players
- Hattiesburg Hubman players
- Hattiesburg Timberjacks players
- Hattiesburg Woodpeckers players
- Hattiesburg Tar Heels players
- Hattiesburg (minor league baseball) players
