= Hal Goldsmith =

Hal Goldsmith may refer to:

- Hal Goldsmith (baseball) (1898–1985), American Major League pitcher
- Hal Goldsmith (fencer) (1930–2004), American Olympic competitor
