= Brookhaven Truckers =

- 1904–1925; (1904, 1924–1925); Brookhaven, Mississippi

Minor league affiliations
- Class: Class D (1904, 1924–1925)
- League: Delta League (1904); Cotton States League (1924–1925)

Major league affiliations
- Team: None

Minor league titles
- League titles (0): None
- Conference titles (0): None

Team data
- Name: Brookhaven (1904); Brookhaven Truckers (1924–1925)
- Ballpark: High School Park (1924–1925)

The Brookhaven Truckers were a minor league baseball team based in Brookhaven, Mississippi. After the Brookhaven team played as a member of the 1904 Class D level Delta League, the Truckers were a member of the Class D level Cotton States League in 1924 and 1925, hosting home games at the High School Park.

== History ==
=== 1904: Delta League ===
Brookhaven, Mississippi first hosted minor league baseball in 1904. The Brookhaven team played as charter members of the Class D level Delta League. The Canton, Clarksdale, Hattiesburg, Jackson Senators and Yazoo City Zoos teams joined Brookhaven in beginning play on May 9, 1904.

With a record of 27–70, Brookhaven finished the 1904 season in last place in the six–team league. Brookhaven finished 39.5 games behind the first place Clarksdale team, placing sixth in the final Delta League standings. The Delta League permanently folded after one season of play.

=== 1925 & 1925: Cotton States League ===
Brookhaven, Mississippi next hosted minor league baseball in 1924, when the Brookhaven "Truckers" became members of the six–team Class D level Cotton States League. The Hattiesburg Hubmen, Jackson Senators, Laurel Lumberjacks, Monroe Drillers and Vicksburg Hill Billies joined Brookhaven in beginning league play on May 8, 1924.

The Brookhaven Truckers ended the 1924 Cotton States League season schedule with an overall record of 43–50, placing fourth in the final regular season standings. Managed by Sammy Vick, Brookhaven finished 19.0 games behind the first place Hattiesburg Hubmen in the final standings. Hattiesburg won both half–seasons of league play, so no playoffs were held. Brookhaven player/manager Sammy Vick led the Cotton States League with 16 home runs.

The Truckers played their final season in 1925. The 1925 Cotton States League expanded to eight teams, adding the Alexandria Reds and Meridian Mets franchises. Led by managers Tom Toland and Tex Covington, the 1925 Brookhaven Truckers placed seventh in the Cotton States League final standings. The Truckers had a regular season record of 56–69 and finished 15.5 games behind the first place[Meridian Mets in the eight–team league. Brookhaven did not qualify for the Cotton States League playoffs, won by the Jackson Red Sox.

Following the 1925 season, the Brookhaven franchise moved to become the Gulfport Tarpons. Reportedly, a group of local Gulfport businessmen bought the Cotton States League's Brookhaven Truckers franchise and moved the team to Gulfport, Mississippi for the 1926 season.

Brookhaven, Mississippi has not hosted another minor league team.

== The ballparks ==
The Bookhaven Truckers played home minor league games at the High School Park. Today, Brookhaven High School is located at 443 East Monticello Street, Brookhaven, Mississippi.

== Timeline ==
Year(s)	# Yrs.	Team	Level	League	Ballpark
1904	1	Brookhaven	Class D	Delta League	Unknown
1924–1925	2	Brookhaven Truckers	Class D	Cotton States League	Brookhaven High School Park

== Year–by–year record ==
Year	Record	Finish	Manager	Playoffs
1904	27–70	6th	NA	No playoffs Held
1924	43–50	4th	Sammy Vick	No playoffs held
1925	56–69	7th	Tom Toland / Tex Covington	Did not qualify

== Notable alumni ==
- Hod Lisenbee (1924)
- Lou Schettler (1904)
- Sammy Vick (1924, MGR)

== See also ==
- Brookhaven (minor league baseball) players
