= Delta League =

- Classification: Class D (1904)
- Sport: Minor League Baseball
- First season: 1904
- Folded: 1905
- President: S.L. Dodds (1904); V.M. Scanlan (1904)
- No. of teams: 6
- Country: United States of America
- Most titles: 1 Clarksdale (1904)

The Delta League was a Class D level minor league baseball league that played in the 1904 season. The six–team Delta League consisted of franchises based in Mississippi. The Delta League permanently folded after completing the 1904 season, in which Clarksdale captured the league championship.

== History ==
The Delta League began play on May 9, 1904, as four charter members formed for the 1910 Class D level League. The Delta League started the season with the Brookhaven, Mississippi team, Clarksdale (baseball) team, Jackson Senators and Yazoo City Zoos were the four charter members. On May 16, 1904, teams from Canton, Mississippi and Hattiesburg, Mississippi were added to the league after the season started. The 1904 league presidents were S.L. Dodds and V.M. Scanlan.

The league schedule ended on September 3, 1904. The final Delta League standings were led by the first place Clarksdale team, who ended with a record of 67–31, finishing 4.0 games ahead of the second place Yazoo City Zoos (62–34). They were followed by followed by third place Canton (43–45), the Jackson Senators (47–53), Hattiesburg (36–49) and Brookhaven (27–70) in the six–team league. The league did not have playoffs in 1904.

The Delta League permanently folded after playing their only season in 1904. Sources indicate the league formed in 1905, but no teams or statistics are known for a 1905 Delta League season.

== 1904 Delta League teams ==
| Team name | City represented | Ballpark | Year active |
|---|---|---|---|
| Brookhaven | Brookhaven, MS | Unknown | 1904 |
| Canton | Canton, MS | Red Bud Park | 1904 |
| Clarksdale | Clarksdale, MS | Unknown | 1904 |
| Hattiesburg | Hattiesburg, MS | Unknown | 1904 |
| Jackson Senators | Jackson, MS | Athletic Park | 1904 |
| Yazoo City Zoos | Yazoo City, MS | Unknown | 1904 |

== Standings and statistics ==
=== 1904 Delta League ===
| Team standings | W | L | PCT | GB | Managers |
|---|---|---|---|---|---|
| Clarksdale | 67 | 31 | .684 | – | William Gaston |
| Yazoo City Zoos | 62 | 34 | .646 | 4 | Wilson |
| Canton | 43 | 45 | .489 | 19 | Freeman |
| Jackson Senators | 47 | 53 | .470 | 21 | H. Foster |
| Hattiesburg | 36 | 49 | .424 | 24½ | Cooney Best |
| Brookhaven | 27 | 70 | .278 | 39½ | NA |

Player statistics
| Player | Team | Stat | Tot | Player | Team | Stat | Tot |
|---|---|---|---|---|---|---|---|
| Harry Vitter | Canton | BA | .330 | Baxter Sparks | Yazoo City | W | 25 |
| H. Foster | Jackson | Runs | 83 | Harry Kane | Clarksdale | SO | 131 |
| William Gaston | Clarksdale | Hits | 91 | Harry Kane | Clarksdale | Pct | .857; 18–3 |
