= Hal Irelan =

American baseball player (1890–1944)

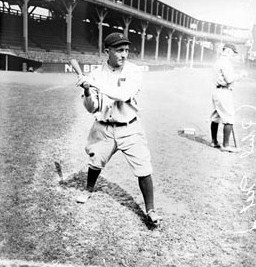
- Second baseman
- Born: August 5, 1890; Burnettsville, Indiana, U.S.
- Died: July 16, 1944 (aged 53); Carmel, Indiana, U.S.
- Batted: Both Threw: Right

MLB debut
- April 23, 1914, for the Philadelphia Phillies

Last MLB appearance
- October 6, 1914, for the Philadelphia Phillies

MLB statistics
- Batting average: .236
- Home runs: 1
- Runs batted in: 16
- Stats at Baseball Reference

Teams
- Philadelphia Phillies (1914)

Harold Irelan (August 5, 1890 – July 16, 1944) was an American Major League Baseball player. Nicknamed "Grump", Irelan played for Philadelphia Phillies in 1914 as a second baseman.

Irelan was born in Burnettsville, Indiana, and died in Carmel, Indiana.
