= List of Ole Miss Rebels baseball seasons =

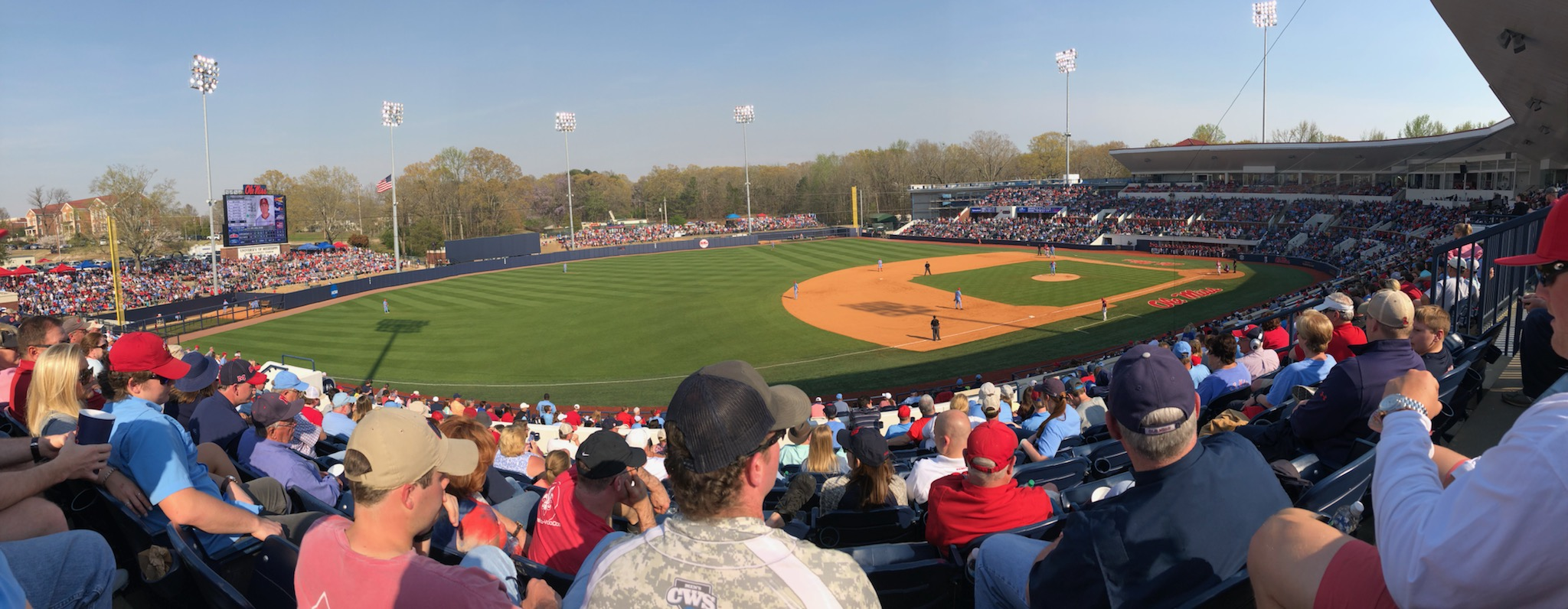
Swayze Field

This is a list of Ole Miss Rebels baseball seasons. The Ole Miss Rebels baseball program is the college baseball team that represents the University of Mississippi in the Western Division of the Southeastern Conference (SEC) in the National Collegiate Athletic Association. Ole Miss plays their home games at Swayze Field in Oxford, Mississippi.

== Season results ==
National champions	College World Series berth	NCAA tournament berth	Conference Tournament champions	Conference/Division Regular season Champions

Season	Head coach	Conference (Note: Ole Miss was a member of the Southern Intercollegiate Athletic Association from 1896 until 1921, but the conference did not sponsor baseball. The Southern Conference, of which Ole Miss was a member from 1922 until 1933, did not sponsor baseball until 1947. Since the 1934 season, Ole Miss has been a member of the Southeastern Conference.)	Season results										Tournament results		Final poll (Note: Collegiate Baseball began team rankings in 1959.)
Season	Head coach	Conference	Overall				Conference						Conference (Note: The Southeastern Conference began a baseball tournament in 1977.)	Postseason (Note: Postseason play involving the NCAA Division I Baseball Championship began in 1947.)	CB
Season	Head coach	Conference	Wins	Losses	Ties	%	Wins	Losses	Ties	%	Overall SEC Finish	Western Division Finish	Conference	Postseason	CB
Ole Miss Rebels
1893	Unknown	Independent	0	1	1	.000	—	—	—	—	—		—	—	—
1894	No Team														
1895	Unknown	Independent	0	2	1	.000	—	—	—	—	—		—	—	—
1896	No Team														
1897	Unknown	Independent	1	1	0	.500	—	—	—	—	—		—	—	—
1898	No Team														
1899	No Team														
1900	T.H. Johnson	Southern Intercollegiate Athletic Association	0	6	0	.000	—	—	—	—	—		—	—	—
1901	P.J. Murphy	Southern Intercollegiate Athletic Association	1	4	0	.250	—	—	—	—	—		—	—	—
1902	Coach Ashford	Southern Intercollegiate Athletic Association	10	7	0	.588	—	—	—	—	—		—	—	—
1903	Dr. W.S. Leathers	Southern Intercollegiate Athletic Association	0	0	0	.000	—	—	—	—	—		—	—	—
1904	T.J. Keefe	Southern Intercollegiate Athletic Association	7	2	0	.778	—	—	—	—	—		—	—	—
1905	J.C. Elmer	Southern Intercollegiate Athletic Association	2	4	0	.333	—	—	—	—	—		—	—	—
1906	Unknown	Southern Intercollegiate Athletic Association	3	5	0	.375	—	—	—	—	—		—	—	—
1907	Unknown	Southern Intercollegiate Athletic Association	6	5	0	.545	—	—	—	—	—		—	—	—
1908	J.M. Acker	Southern Intercollegiate Athletic Association	2	2	0	.500	—	—	—	—	—		—	—	—
1909	Unknown	Southern Intercollegiate Athletic Association	3	5	0	.375	—	—	—	—	—		—	—	—
1910	J.W. McCall	Southern Intercollegiate Athletic Association	11	3	0	.786	—	—	—	—	—		—	—	—
1911	Edgard Moss	Southern Intercollegiate Athletic Association	1	5	0	.167	—	—	—	—	—		—	—	—
1912	Edgard Moss	Southern Intercollegiate Athletic Association	11	14	0	.440	—	—	—	—	—		—	—	—
1913	No Team														
1914	Casey Stengel	Southern Intercollegiate Athletic Association	13	9	0	.591	—	—	—	—	—		—	—	—
1915	Unknown	Southern Intercollegiate Athletic Association	1	1	0	.500	—	—	—	—	—		—	—	—
1916	Fred A. Robins	Southern Intercollegiate Athletic Association	11	14	0	.440	—	—	—	—	—		—	—	—
1917	Baxter Sparks	Southern Intercollegiate Athletic Association	3	5	1	.333	—	—	—	—	—		—	—	—
1918	Dudy Noble	Southern Intercollegiate Athletic Association	9	1	0	.900	—	—	—	—	—		—	—	—
1919	Dudy Noble	Southern Intercollegiate Athletic Association	1	3	0	.250	—	—	—	—	—		—	—	—
1920	Unknown	Southern Intercollegiate Athletic Association	4	2	0	.667	—	—	—	—	—		—	—	—
1921	Unknown	Southern Intercollegiate Athletic Association	3	4	0	.429	—	—	—	—	—		—	—	—
1922	Unknown	Southern Conference	0	6	0	.000	—	—	—	—	—		—	—	—
1923	Pete Shields	Southern Conference	18	3	1	.841	—	—	—	—	—		—	—	—
1924	Pete Shields	Southern Conference	13	9	0	.591	—	—	—	—	—		—	—	—
1925	Pete Shields	Southern Conference	14	6	0	.700	—	—	—	—	—		—	—	—
1926	Pete Shields	Southern Conference	15	6	0	.714	—	—	—	—	—		—	—	—
1927	Pete Shields	Southern Conference	11	4	0	.733	—	—	—	—	—		—	—	—
1928	Pete Shields	Southern Conference	2	8	1	.227	—	—	—	—	—		—	—	—
1929	Pete Shields	Southern Conference	18	3	0	.857	—	—	—	—	—		—	—	—
1930	Pete Shields	Southern Conference	13	10	0	.565	—	—	—	—	—		—	—	—
1931	Pete Shields	Southern Conference	10	10	0	.500	—	—	—	—	—		—	—	—
1932	Tad Smith	Southern Conference	8	8	0	.500	—	—	—	—	—		—	—	—
1933	Tad Smith	Southern Conference	0	2	0	.000	—	—	—	—	—		—	—	—
1934	Tad Smith	Southeastern Conference	1	13	1	.077	0	9	0	.000	10th		—	—	—
1935	Tad Smith	Southeastern Conference	5	13	0	.278	0	10	0	.000	8th		—	—	—
1936	Tad Smith	Southeastern Conference	4	9	0	.308	1	8	0	.111	7th		—	—	—
1937	Tad Smith	Southeastern Conference	9	8	1	.500	4	4	0	.500	4th		—	—	—
1938	Tad Smith	Southeastern Conference	13	6	1	.650	5	5	0	.500	4th		—	—	—
1939	Tad Smith	Southeastern Conference	12	6	0	.667	7	5	0	.583	4th		—	—	—
1940	Tad Smith	Southeastern Conference	8	14	0	.364	1	11	0	.083	12th		—	—	—
1941	Tad Smith	Southeastern Conference	9	7	0	.563	7	4	0	.636	3rd		—	—	—
1942	Tad Smith	Southeastern Conference	4	8	1	.346	4	7	0	.363	8th		—	—	—
1943	Edwin "Goat" Hale	Southeastern Conference	2	10	0	.200	2	10	0	.200	10th		—	—	—
1944		Southeastern Conference	Did not play – World War II												
1945		Southeastern Conference	Did not play – World War II												
1946	Tad Smith	Southeastern Conference	3	3	0	.500	3	3	0	.500	5th		—	—	—
1947	Tad Smith	Southeastern Conference	10	6	0	.625	4	4	0	.500	T-6th		—	—	—
1948	Tad Smith	Southeastern Conference	6	16	0	.273	4	13	0	.235	11th		—	—	—
1949	Tad Smith	Southeastern Conference	4	18	0	.182	2	12	0	.143	12th		—	—	—
1950	Tad Smith	Southeastern Conference	11	6	0	.647	5	5	0	.500	6th		—	—	—
1951	Tom Swayze	Southeastern Conference	16	6	1	.717	10	4	0	.714	3rd		—	—	—
1952	Tom Swayze	Southeastern Conference	10	10	0	.500	6	10	0	.375	11th		—	—	—
1953	Tom Swayze	Southeastern Conference	9	10	0	.474	8	9	0	.471	6th		—	—	—
1954	Tom Swayze	Southeastern Conference	15	7	1	.673	6	3	0	.667	2nd		—	—	—
1955	Tom Swayze	Southeastern Conference	16	3	0	.842	10	3	0	.769	2nd		—	—	
1956	Tom Swayze	Southeastern Conference	24	10	0	.706	13	3	0	.813	T-1st		—	College World Series	
1957	Tom Swayze	Southeastern Conference	16	8	0	.667	9	6	0	.600	6th		—	—	—
1958	Tom Swayze	Southeastern Conference	11	10	0	.524	7	6	0	.538	8th		—	—	—
1959	Tom Swayze	Southeastern Conference	18	6	0	.750	10	3	0	.769	1st		—	—	13
1960	Tom Swayze	Southeastern Conference	22	3	0	.880	12	2	0	.857	1st		—	—	11
1961	Tom Swayze	Southeastern Conference	15	8	0	.652	10	5	0	.667	2nd		—	—	
1962	Tom Swayze	Southeastern Conference	15	10	0	.600	8	9	0	.471	3rd		—	—	
1963	Tom Swayze	Southeastern Conference	19	7	0	.731	11	4	0	.733	1st		—	—	13
1964	Tom Swayze	Southeastern Conference	24	7	0	.774	11	1	0	.917	1st		—	College World Series	2
1965	Tom Swayze	Southeastern Conference	10	12	0	.455	8	7	0	.533	2nd		—	—	
1966	Tom Swayze	Southeastern Conference	18	14	0	.563	10	6	0	.625	2nd		—	—	
1967	Tom Swayze	Southeastern Conference	15	14	0	.517	9	8	0	.529	T-1st		—	—	
1968	Tom Swayze	Southeastern Conference	20	12	0	.625	8	9	0	.471	3rd		—	—	23
1969	Tom Swayze	Southeastern Conference	27	15	0	.643	11	5	0	.688	1st		—	College World Series	5
1970	Tom Swayze	Southeastern Conference	25	8	0	.758	11	6	0	.647	2nd		—	—	17
1971	Tom Swayze	Southeastern Conference	16	21	0	.432	7	11	0	.389	3rd		—	—	
1972	Jake Gibbs	Southeastern Conference	28	16	0	.636	15	3	0	.833	1st		—	College World Series	6
1973	Jake Gibbs	Southeastern Conference	14	12	1	.518	5	8	0	.385	3rd		—	—	
1974	Jake Gibbs	Southeastern Conference	17	15	0	.531	7	8	0	.467	3rd		—	—	
1975	Jake Gibbs	Southeastern Conference	25	19	1	.567	10	12	0	.455	2nd		—	—	
1976	Jake Gibbs	Southeastern Conference	18	18	1	.500	11	13	0	.458	5th		—	—	
1977	Jake Gibbs	Southeastern Conference	39	19	0	.672	15	9	0	.625	1st		1st	South Regional	10
1978	Jake Gibbs	Southeastern Conference	27	21	0	.563	12	11	0	.522	3rd			—	
1979	Jake Gibbs	Southeastern Conference	24	13	0	.649	9	10	0	.474	3rd			—	
1980	Jake Gibbs	Southeastern Conference	24	22	0	.522	9	9	0	.500	2nd			—	
1981	Jake Gibbs	Southeastern Conference	24	24	1	.500	8	14	1	.364	3rd			—	
1982	Jake Gibbs	Southeastern Conference	33	19	1	.632	15	6	0	.714	1st			—	19
1983	Jake Gibbs	Southeastern Conference	26	18	1	.589	10	12	0	.455	3rd			—	
1984	Jake Gibbs	Southeastern Conference	22	24	0	.478	7	16	0	.304	5th			—	
1985	Jake Gibbs	Southeastern Conference	20	28	0	.417	5	18	0	.217	5th			—	
1986	Jake Gibbs	Southeastern Conference	38	17	0	.691	14	13	0	.519	T-4th			—	23
1987	Jake Gibbs	Southeastern Conference	25	25	1	.500	11	16	0	.407	8th			—	
1988	Jake Gibbs	Southeastern Conference	24	29	0	.453	6	21	0	.222	10th			—	
1989	Jake Gibbs	Southeastern Conference	34	21	1	.616	9	15	1	.380	8th			—	25
1990	Jake Gibbs	Southeastern Conference	23	29	0	.442	10	16	0	.385	8th			—	
1991	Don Kessinger	Southeastern Conference	31	24	0	.564	9	15	0	.375	8th			—	
1992	Don Kessinger	Southeastern Conference	29	26	0	.527	9	14	0	.391	11th	5th		—	
1993	Don Kessinger	Southeastern Conference	31	25	0	.554	8	19	0	.296	12th	6th		—	
1994	Don Kessinger	Southeastern Conference	30	26	0	.536	12	14	0	.462	7th	5th		—	
1995	Don Kessinger	Southeastern Conference	40	22	0	.645	14	12	0	.539	5th	4th		Atlantic I Regional	14
1996	Don Kessinger	Southeastern Conference	24	30	0	.444	7	23	0	.233	12th	6th		—	
1997	Pat Harrison	Southeastern Conference	22	31	0	.415	6	24	0	.200	12th	6th		—	
1998	Pat Harrison	Southeastern Conference	30	23	0	.566	13	15	0	.464	8th	6th		—	
1999	Pat Harrison	Southeastern Conference	34	28	0	.548	17	13	0	.567	5th	5th		College Station Regional	
2000	Pat Harrison	Southeastern Conference	30	25	0	.545	12	17	0	.414	9th	5th		—	
2001	Mike Bianco	Southeastern Conference	39	23	1	.627	17	13	0	.567	6th	3rd		New Orleans Regional	25
2002	Mike Bianco	Southeastern Conference	37	19	0	.661	14	16	0	.467	9th	6th		—	
2003	Mike Bianco	Southeastern Conference	35	27	0	.565	17	13	0	.567	5th	4th		Houston Regional	
2004	Mike Bianco	Southeastern Conference	39	21	0	.650	18	12	0	.600	4th	3rd		Oxford Regional	19
2005	Mike Bianco	Southeastern Conference	48	20	0	.706	18	12	0	.600	4th	2nd	2nd	Oxford Super Regional	8
2006	Mike Bianco	Southeastern Conference	44	22	0	.667	17	13	0	.567	5th	3rd	1st	Oxford Super Regional	10
2007	Mike Bianco	Southeastern Conference	40	25	0	.615	16	14	0	.533	5th	3rd		Tempe Super Regional	10
2008	Mike Bianco	Southeastern Conference	39	26	0	.600	15	15	0	.500	8th	3rd	2nd	Coral Gables Regional	
2009	Mike Bianco	Southeastern Conference	44	20	0	.687	20	10	0	.667	T-1st	T-1st		Oxford Super Regional	9
2010	Mike Bianco	Southeastern Conference	39	24	0	.619	16	14	0	.533	6th	3rd		Charlottesville Regional	24
2011	Mike Bianco	Southeastern Conference	30	25	0	.545	13	17	0	.433	10th	6th		—	
2012	Mike Bianco	Southeastern Conference	37	26	0	.587	14	16	0	.467	9th	4th		College Station Regional	
2013	Mike Bianco	Southeastern Conference	38	24	0	.613	15	15	0	.500	6th	4th		Raleigh Regional	
2014	Mike Bianco	Southeastern Conference	48	21	0	.696	19	11	0	.633	2nd	1st		College World Series	3
2015	Mike Bianco	Southeastern Conference	30	28	0	.517	15	14	0	.517	6th	4th		Los Angeles Regional	
2016	Mike Bianco	Southeastern Conference	43	19	0	.694	18	12	0	.600	7th	4th		Oxford Regional	15
2017	Mike Bianco	Southeastern Conference	32	25	0	.561	14	16	0	.467	9th	6th		—	
2018	Mike Bianco	Southeastern Conference	48	17	0	.738	18	12	0	.600	2nd	T-1st	1st	Oxford Regional	9
2019	Mike Bianco	Southeastern Conference	41	27	0	.603	16	14	0	.533	7th	5th	2nd	Fayetteville Super Regional	9
2020	Mike Bianco	Southeastern Conference	16	1	0	.941	0	0	0	–	N/A	N/A		COVID-19 Pandemic	1
2021	Mike Bianco	Southeastern Conference	45	22	0	.672	18	12	0	.600	5th	3rd		Tucson Super Regional	10
2022	Mike Bianco	Southeastern Conference	42	23	0	.646	14	16	0	.467	9th	5th		National Champions	1
2023	Mike Bianco	Southeastern Conference	25	29	0	.463	6	24	0	.200	14th	7th		—	
2024	Mike Bianco	Southeastern Conference	27	29	0	.482	11	19	0	.367	12th	6th		—	
2025	Mike Bianco	Southeastern Conference	43	21	0	.672	16	14	0	.533	7th	—	2nd	Oxford Regional	21
2026	Mike Bianco	Southeastern Conference	41	23	0	.641	15	15	0	.500	9th	—		College World Series	7

=== Notes ===
Sources:
