= Hattiesburg Zoo =

Zoo in Hattiesburg, Mississippi

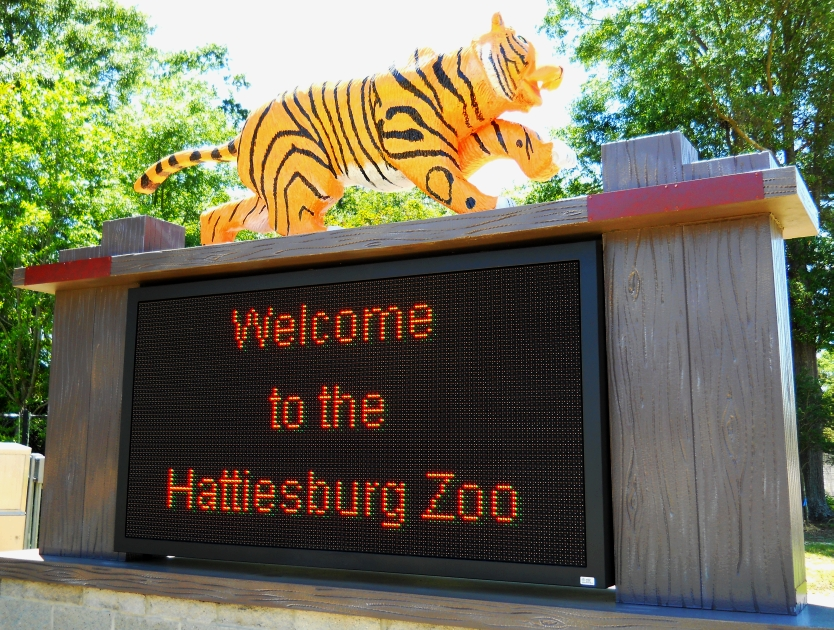
- Interactive map of Hattiesburg Zoo
- 31.323736°N 89.315275°W
- Date opened: 1950
- Location: Hattiesburg, Mississippi, United States
- Land area: 12 acres (4.9 ha)
- No. of species: 55+
- Annual visitors: 125,792 (2014)
- Website: www.zoohattiesburg.com

The Hattiesburg Zoo (sometimes also called the Kamper Park Zoo) is a small 12-acre (4.9 ha) zoo located within Kamper Park in Hattiesburg, Mississippi, United States. The zoo is operated by the Hattiesburg Convention Commission. As of 2019, the Commission's executive director was Rick Taylor. The Zoo is accredited by the Association of Zoos and Aquariums and the Zoological Association of America.

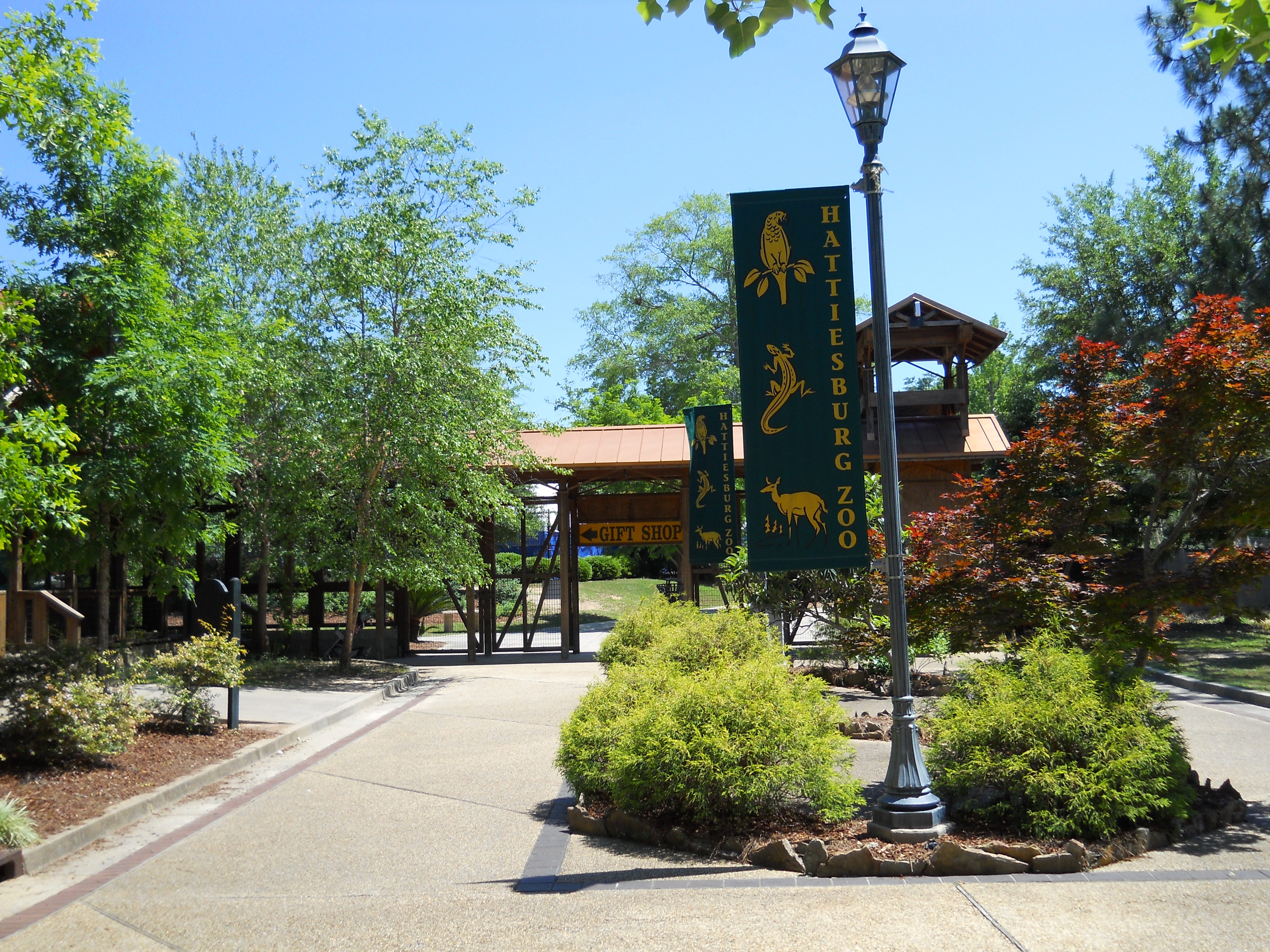
Entrance area at Zoo

== History ==
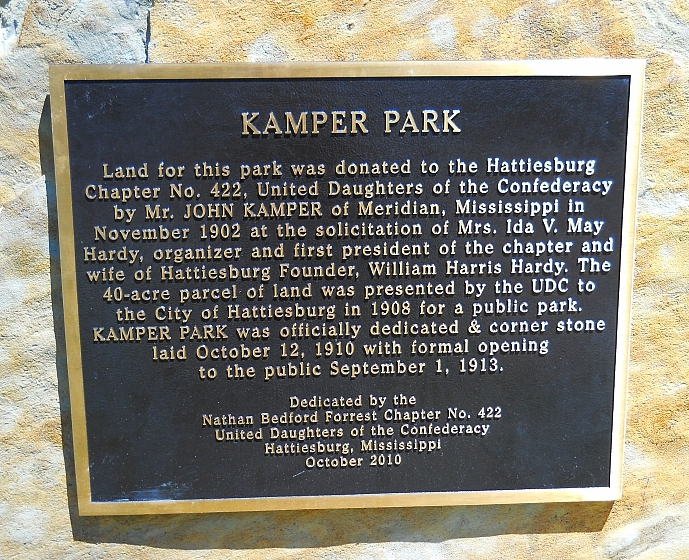

The 40 acres (16 ha) for Kamper Park was donated to the Daughters of the Confederacy by John Kamper in 1902, and was given in turn to Hattiesburg in 1908 for a public park. The zoo was opened on about 12 acres (4.9 ha) of the 40-acre (16 ha) park in 1950. In 2025, the Zoo presented a year-long 75th Anniversary celebration.

== Exhibits ==
The zoo is located within Kamper Park among a grove of oak and pine trees, and is divided into several geographical sections. Animal exhibits include amphibians, birds, invertebrates, mammals, and reptiles.

=== Africa ===
The zoo's northmost area, the exhibit starts off with a mixed exhibit for African Hornbills and porcupines, a Fennec Fox exhibit, and a large veldt area featuring Grant's zebras, bongos, ostriches, and East African Crowned Cranes. Other exhibits include servals, sulcata tortoises, and DeBrazza guenon monkeys.

=== Wallaby Walkabout ===
In 2018, the zoo opened a barrier-free walk through, where visitors can interact with Bennett's wallabies, emus, and kunekune pigs.

== Education ==
=== Asbury Discovery Center ===
In 2014, the 2,200 ft^{2} (200 m^{2}) Asbury Discovery Center opened to serve as a combined laboratory, classroom, and office space. The education center provides learning opportunities for children and adults. This building also provides habitats for the zoo's reptiles, Galapagos tortoise, a family of sloths, a prehensile-tailed porcupine, a Von der Decken's hornbill, and numerous other ambassador animals (animals used in educational programming).

== The future ==
On January 5, 2018, Rick Taylor, the executive director of the Hattiesburg Convention Commission, advised the Hattiesburg City Council of the expansion of the Africa area to include new exhibits for giraffes, colobus monkeys, and spotted hyenas. This new area opened in 2021. Several additional exhibits feature Chilean flamingos, a Giant Anteater, a Lowland Tapir, Genets, Spider Monkeys, and Miniature Donkeys. In 2025, The Hattiesburg Zoo switched to Connect&GO's Attraction Management System to modernize their operations.
