= Clarence Kraft =

American baseball player (1887–1958)

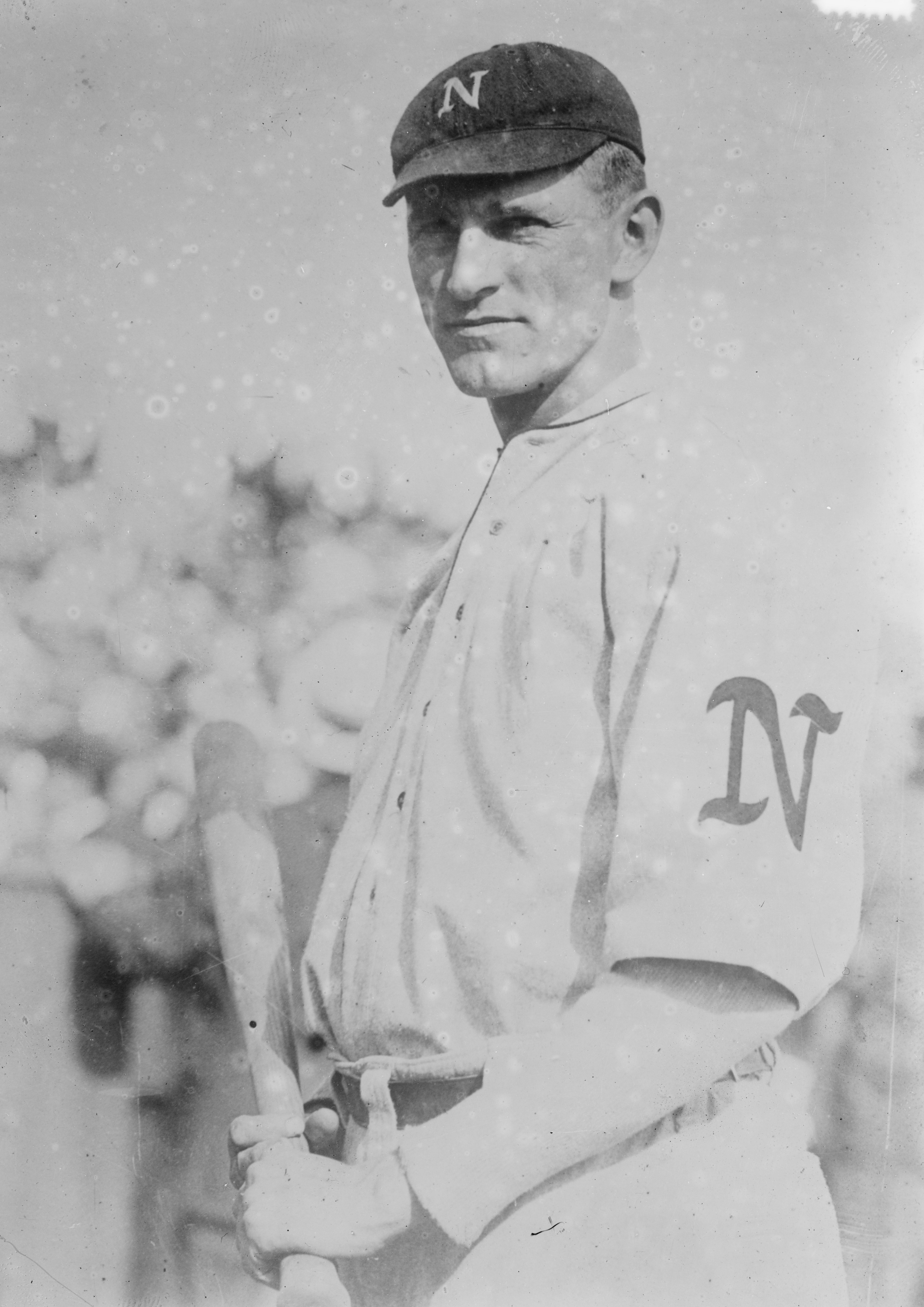
- Kraft in 1914
- First baseman
- Born: June 9, 1887; Evansville, Indiana, U.S.
- Died: March 26, 1958 (aged 70); Fort Worth, Texas, U.S.
- Batted: Right Threw: Right

MLB debut
- May 1, 1914, for the Boston Braves

Last MLB appearance
- May 15, 1914, for the Boston Braves

MLB statistics
- Batting average: .333
- Home runs: 0
- Runs batted in: 0
- Stats at Baseball Reference

Teams
- Boston Braves (1914)

Clarence Otto Kraft (June 9, 1887 – March 26, 1958) was an American Major League Baseball player. He played in three games for the Boston Braves in 1914, but only appeared once in the field (at first base). He went 1-for-3 at the plate with one strikeout.

His greater claims to fame came later, in the minor leagues. The first came immediately after his Major League career ended. The Braves had acquired Kraft from the Brooklyn Robins, and returned Kraft to them in July. Brooklyn tried to send Kraft to the minor leagues, but Kraft sought the protection of the newly formed Fraternity of Professional Baseball Players of America, which under the terms of a new agreement with the Major League teams would allow Kraft to tender his services to higher-classed minor league teams. Under this clause, Kraft signed with the Class AA Newark Indians. However, the National Commission ruled that the rule could not be applied retroactively, and that Kraft's rights belonged to the Class A Nashville Volunteers. Kraft refused to report to the Volunteers, however, and the dispute was only settled when Robins owner Charles Ebbets paid Nashville $2,500 to rescind their claim on Kraft.

Later, playing for the Fort Worth Panthers, Kraft led the Texas League in home runs three straight times (1922–1924). In 1924, he hit 55 home runs and drove in 196 runs for the Panthers while batting .349. That season, he set several league records that stand to this day, including most runs scored (150), extra base hits (96), total bases (414) and runs batted in. Following the season, he announced his retirement and opened an auto dealership. He later served as a judge for Tarrant County before his death in 1958.
