= Claude Thomas (baseball) =

American baseball player (1890–1946)

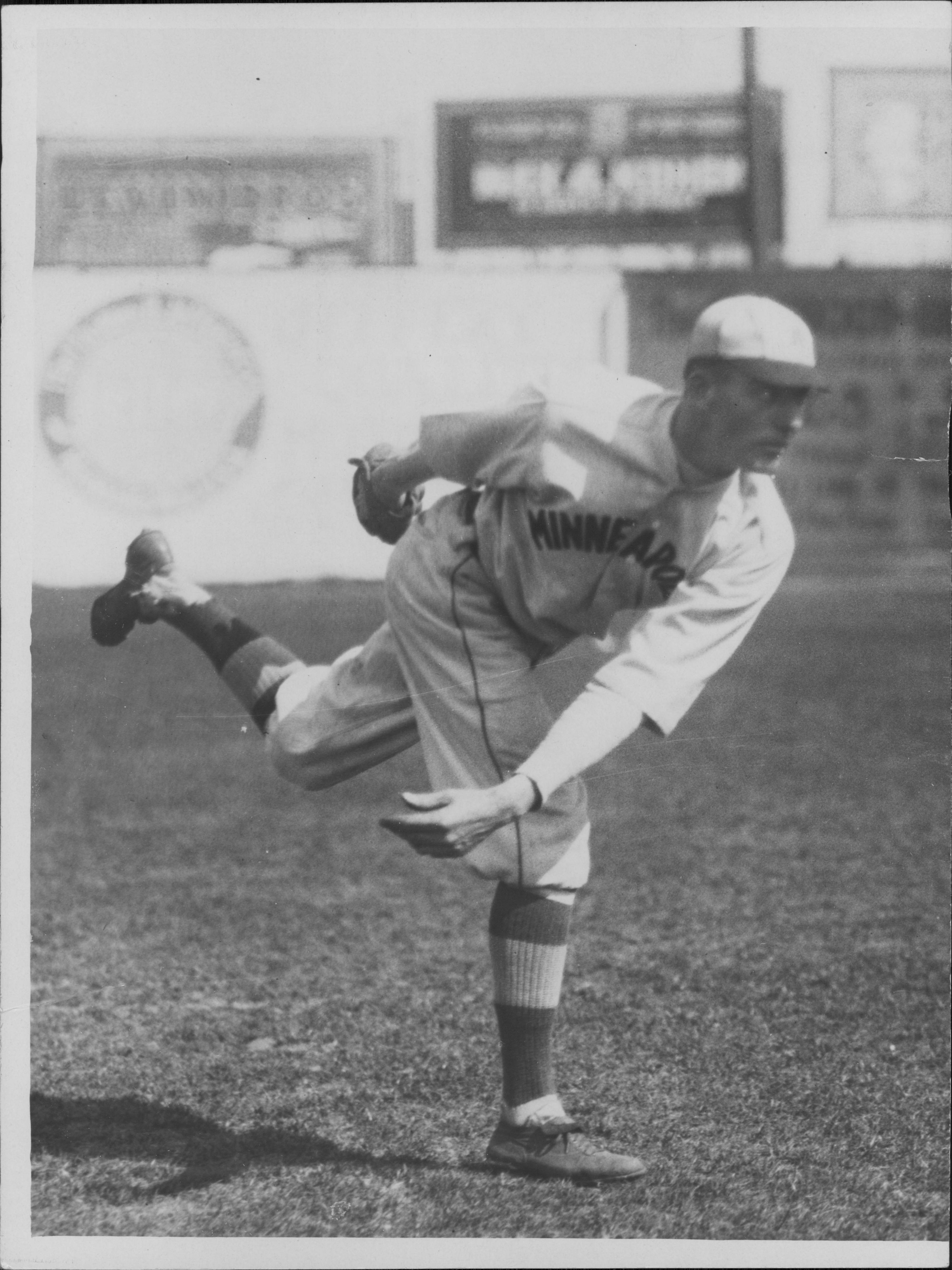
- Pitcher
- Born: May 15, 1890; Stanberry, Missouri, U.S.
- Died: March 6, 1946 (aged 55); Sulphur, Oklahoma, U.S.
- Batted: Left Threw: Left

MLB debut
- September 13, 1916, for the Washington Senators

Last MLB appearance
- October 2, 1916, for the Washington Senators

MLB statistics
- Win–loss record: 1–2
- Earned run average: 4.13
- Strikeouts: 7
- Stats at Baseball Reference

Teams
- Washington Senators (1916)

Claude Alfred "Lefty" Thomas (May 15, 1890 – March 6, 1946) was an American Major League Baseball pitcher who played for the Washington Senators in 1916.
