= John Kane (infielder) =

American baseball player (1900–1956)

- Infielder
- Born: February 19, 1900; Chicago, Illinois, U.S.
- Died: July 25, 1956 (aged 56); Chicago, Illinois, U.S.
- Batted: Both Threw: Right

MLB debut
- September 3, 1925, for the Chicago White Sox

Last MLB appearance
- September 18, 1925, for the Chicago White Sox

MLB statistics
- Batting average: .179
- Home runs: 0
- Runs batted in: 3
- Stats at Baseball Reference

Teams
- Chicago White Sox (1925)

John Francis Kane (February 19, 1900 – July 25, 1956) was an American professional baseball player. He was an infielder for one season (1925) with the Chicago White Sox. For his career, he compiled a .179 batting average in 56 at-bats, with three runs batted in.

He was born and later died in Chicago, Illinois at the age of 56.
