= Horace Leverette =

American baseball player (1889-1958)

Hod Leverette
- Pitcher
- Born: February 4, 1889; Shreveport, Louisiana, U.S.
- Died: April 10, 1958 (aged 68); St. Petersburg, Florida, U.S.
- Batted: Right Threw: Right

MLB debut
- April 22, 1920, for the St. Louis Browns

Last MLB appearance
- May 8, 1920, for the St. Louis Browns

MLB statistics
- Win–loss record: 0–2
- Earned run average: 5.23
- Strikeouts: 0
- Stats at Baseball Reference

Teams
- St. Louis Browns (1920)

Horace Wilbur "Hod" Leverette (February 4, 1889 – April 10, 1958) was an American Major League Baseball pitcher who played for the St. Louis Browns in 1920.
