= John Merritt (baseball) =

American baseball player (1894-1955)

- Outfielder
- Born: October 12, 1894; Tupelo, Mississippi, U.S.
- Died: November 3, 1955 (aged 61); Tupelo, Mississippi, U.S.
- Batted: Right Threw: Left

MLB debut
- September 27, 1913, for the New York Giants

Last MLB appearance
- September 27, 1913, for the New York Giants

MLB statistics
- Games played: 1
- Plate appearances: 0
- Hits: 0
- Stats at Baseball Reference

Teams
- New York Giants (1913)

John Howard Merritt (October 12, 1894 – November 3, 1955) was an American outfielder in Major League Baseball. He played one game for the New York Giants in 1913.
