= Earl Webb =

American baseball player (1897–1965)

- Outfielder / First baseman
- Born: September 17, 1897; White County, Tennessee, U.S.
- Died: May 23, 1965 (aged 67); Jamestown, Tennessee, U.S.
- Batted: Left Threw: Right

MLB debut
- August 13, 1925, for the New York Giants

Last MLB appearance
- October 1, 1933, for the Chicago White Sox

MLB statistics
- Batting average: .306
- Hits: 661
- Home runs: 56
- Runs batted in: 333
- Stats at Baseball Reference

Teams
- New York Giants (1925); Chicago Cubs (1927–1928); Boston Red Sox (1930–1932); Detroit Tigers (1932–1933); Chicago White Sox (1933)

Career highlights and awards
- MLB records: Most doubles in a season: 67 (1931)

William Earl Webb (September 17, 1897 – May 23, 1965) was an American professional baseball outfielder and first baseman in Major League Baseball, playing from 1925 to 1933. He played for five teams, including the Boston Red Sox for three years. He batted left-handed and threw right-handed. He was born in White County, Tennessee.

In 1931, while playing for the Red Sox, he hit a record 67 doubles, a mark that still stands today. Webb set that record as the Red Sox played only 153 games that year, less than the standard 154 games or the current 162-game schedule. That season, Webb also finished second in the American League (AL) in extra base hits (84) and seventh in batting average (.333), as well as coming in sixth in the AL Most Valuable Player voting. He had a career batting average of .306 with 56 home runs and 333 runs batted in.

Webb's professional career began with the Class D Clarksdale Cubs in 1921. He briefly reached the majors in 1925, going hitless with one walk in four plate appearances for the New York Giants. He returned to MLB with the Chicago Cubs in 1927, playing in 164 games over two seasons. He established himself as a regular with the Red Sox in 1930 before his record-setting season the following year. On June 12, 1932, Boston traded him to the Detroit Tigers for Dale Alexander and Roy Johnson. The Chicago White Sox picked Webb off waivers from the White Sox on May 9, 1933. That would be his last season in the majors, though he two seasons each for the minor-league Milwaukee Brewers and Knoxville Smokies.

After his professional career, he worked for the Consolidated Coal Company in Kentucky and managed the company's baseball team. He died on May 23, 1965, at his home in Jamestown, Tennessee.

== See also ==
- List of Major League Baseball doubles records
- List of Major League Baseball annual doubles leaders

Preceded by George Burns	Single season doubles record holders 1931–present	Succeeded by current
