= Yazoo City Zoos =

- 1904–1912; (1904, 1910–1912); Yazoo City, Mississippi

Minor league affiliations
- Class: Class D (1904, 1910–1912)
- League: Delta League (1904); Cotton States League (1910–1912)

Major league affiliations
- Team: None

Minor league titles
- League titles (0): None

Team data
- Name: Yazoo City Zoos (1904, 1910–1912)
- Ballpark: Unknown (1904, 1910–1912)

The Yazoo City Zoos were a minor league baseball team based in Yazoo City, Mississippi. Between 1904 and 1912, the Yazoo City Zoos played as members of two Class D level leagues, the 1904 Delta League and the Cotton States League from 1910 to 1912.

== History ==
=== 1904: Delta League ===
The 1904 Yazoo City Zoos were the first minor league team based in Yazoo City. Playing the 1904 season under manager Harry Wilson, the Zoos became charter members of the Class D level Delta League. The Delta League League began the season with four charter league teams, as the Brookhaven, MS (Brookhaven), Clarksdale, MS (Clarksdale), Jackson Senators teams joined the Yazoo City Zoos as the charter members in. On May 16, 1904, the league expanded to sis teams, as franchises from Canton, MS (Canton) and Hattiesburg, MS (Hattiesburg) were added to the league after the season started.

The Yazoo City Zoos finished in second place when the season ended on September 3, 1904. The final Delta League standings featured the first place Clarksdale team with a record of 67–31, finishing 4.0 games ahead of the second place Yazoo City Zoos who had a record of 62–34. They were followed in the standings by Canton (43–45), the Jackson Senators (47–53), Hattiesburg (36–49) and Brookhaven (27–70) in the six–team league. The league did not have playoffs in 1904.

On June 13, 1904 in a Delta League game, Yazoo City was on the losing end of a no-hitter thrown by William Beeker of Clarksdale in a 6–0 Clarksdale victory.

It was reported that Yazoo City pitcher James Baxter Sparks set a professional baseball record by winning 21 consecutive games in 1904. It was noted that Sparks also threw a no-hitter against Clarksdale during the winning streak, with the game occurring on August 27, 1904, in a 1–0 Yazoo City victory.

The Delta League permanently folded after playing their only season in 1904. It is possible the league formed in 1905, but no teams or statistics are known for a 1905 Delta League season.

=== 1910 to 1912: Cotton States League ===
In 1910, the Yazoo city Zoos returned to minor league play, becoming members of the six-team, Class D level Cotton States League. With a 44–62 record, the team placed fourth in the six-team league, playing the season under manager Walter Hickey. The 1910 team is referred to as the "ZuZus" in some references. Yazoo City finished 26.5 games behind the first place Greenwood Scouts in the final standings.

The Yazoo City Zoos team continued Cotton States League play in 1911. With a 60–54 record, the Zoos placed third under manager Dom Mullaney, finishing 12.5 games behind the first place Vicksburg Hill Billies in the six–team league. The Yazoo City team folded from the Cotton States League after the 1911 season.

In their final season, the 1912 Yazoo City Zoos began the season without a team, then briefly returned to play before folding. On May 9, 1912, the New Orleans Little Pels of the Cotton States League moved to Yazoo City with a 14–9 record. On August 3, 1912, the team had a 27–45 record in Yazoo City and a 41–57 overall record under manager Gene DeMontreville when the franchise permanently disbanded, before the season had concluded.

Yazoo City, Mississippi has not hosted another minor league team.

== The ballpark ==
The name of the Yazoo City home minor league ballpark is not directly referenced.

== Timeline ==
Year(s)	# Yrs.	Team	Level	League
1904	1	Yazoo City Zoos	Class D	Delta League
1910–1912	3	Yazoo City Zoos	Class D	Cotton States League

== Year-by-year records ==
Year	Record	Finish	Manager	Playoffs/Notes
1904	64–34	2nd	Harry Wilson	No playoffs held
1910	44–62	4th	Walter Hickey	No playoffs held
1911	60–54	3rd	Dom Mullaney	No playoffs held
1912	41–57	NA	Gene DeMontreville	New Orleans (14–9) moved to Yazoo City May 9 Team disbanded August 3

== Notable alumni ==
- Harry Betts (1910–1911)
- Joe Martina (1911)
- Moxie Meixell (1912)

== See also ==
- Yazoo City Zoos players
