= Happy Foreman =

American baseball player (1899–1953)

- Pitcher
- Born: July 20, 1897; Memphis, Tennessee, U.S.
- Died: February 13, 1953 (aged 55); New York, New York, U.S.
- Batted: Left Threw: Right

MLB debut
- September 3, 1924, for the Chicago White Sox

Last MLB appearance
- June 25, 1926, for the Boston Red Sox

MLB statistics
- Win–loss record: 0–0
- Earned run average: 3.18
- Strikeouts: 4
- Stats at Baseball Reference

Teams
- Chicago White Sox (1924); Boston Red Sox (1926)

August G. Foreman (July 20, 1899 – February 13, 1953) was an American relief pitcher in Major League Baseball who played between 1924 and 1926 for the Chicago White Sox (1924) and Boston Red Sox (1926). Listed at 5' 7", 160 lb., he batted and threw left-handed. He attended Chamberlain-Hunt Academy in Port Gibson, Mississippi.

Born in Memphis, Tennessee, Foreman was Jewish, and the last of 16 major leaguers nicknamed ″Happy″.

In a two-season career, Foreman posted a 3.18 ERA in six appearances, including four strikeouts, nine walks, three games finished, and 11⅓ innings of work. He did not have a decision.

Foreman died in New York, New York at the age of 55.
