= Harry Kane (baseball) =

American baseball player (1883–1932)

- Pitcher
- Born: July 27, 1883; Hamburg, Arkansas, U.S.
- Died: September 15, 1932 (aged 49); Portland, Oregon, U.S.
- Batted: Left Threw: Left

MLB debut
- August 8, 1902, for the St. Louis Browns

Last MLB appearance
- May 5, 1906, for the Philadelphia Phillies

MLB statistics
- Win–loss record: 2-7
- Earned run average: 4.81
- Strikeouts: 43
- Stats at Baseball Reference

Teams
- St. Louis Browns (1902); Detroit Tigers (1903); Philadelphia Phillies (1905–1906)

Harry Kane (born Henry Kohn) (July 27, 1883 – September 15, 1932) was an American professional baseball player. He played from 1902 to 1906. He was nicknamed Klondike.

Kane was Jewish, and was born in Hamburg, Arkansas.
