= Hal Goldsmith (baseball) =

American baseball player (1898–1985)

- Pitcher
- Born: August 18, 1898; Peconic, New York
- Died: October 20, 1985 (aged 87); Riverhead, New York
- Batted: Right Threw: Right

MLB debut
- June 23, 1926, for the Boston Braves

Last MLB appearance
- August 23, 1929, for the St. Louis Cardinals

MLB statistics
- Win–loss record: 6–10
- Earned run average: 4.04
- Strikeouts: 30
- Stats at Baseball Reference

Teams
- Boston Braves (1926–1928); St. Louis Cardinals (1929)

Harold Eugene "Hal" Goldsmith (August 18, 1898 – October 20, 1985) was a pitcher in Major League Baseball. He played for the Boston Braves from 1926 through 1928 and the St. Louis Cardinals in 1929. He had a career 4.04 earned run average as a professional. Goldsmith played collegiately at St. Lawrence University.
