= Jackson Senators =

Minor league baseball team based in Jackson, Mississippi (USA)

The Jackson Senators was the name of at least two minor league baseball teams that played in Jackson, Mississippi.

== First team ==
The first known Jackson Senators club competed in the Delta League in 1904.

In 1951, club president Emmet Vaughey announced that the club would be disbanded, after the dissolution of the Southeastern League.

Jackson also played as a member of the Cotton States League before 1953. This was a class C minor-league club, and was the last team to represent the city of Jackson before the arrival of the class AA Jackson Mets for the 1975 season.

== Second team ==
The second Jackson Senators team was a member of the independent Central Baseball League from 2002 to 2005, a league that was not affiliated with Major League Baseball. The Senators won the CBL title in 2003. After the CBL disbanded, the Senators were left without a league for the 2006 season.

On January 24, 2006, officials with the team's ownership group, Mississippi Baseball Club LLC, announced that they would not be operating a professional independent team in Jackson for the 2006 season after running the team alongside the Mississippi Braves for the 2005 season, who had relocated to suburban Pearl from Greenville (South Carolina).

The team played at Smith-Wills Stadium.

== Notable players ==
- Jack Mealey (born 1899) -- minor league baseball catcher, who also managed in the minor leagues and served as president of the Sooner State League
