= Cotton States League =

American baseball league(s)

- Sport: Minor League Baseball
- Founded: 1902
- Ceased: 1955
- No. of teams: 32
- Country: United States
- Last champions: 6 Greenville; 5 El Dorado

The Cotton States League was a minor league baseball league that played between 1902 and 1955. The Cotton States League formed on five occasions. The first Cotton States League played from 1902 through 1908 as a Class D level league. After the league did not play in 1909, the Cotton States League was reformulated in 1910, with three of the six 1908 members returning for the new campaign and three new teams joining them. The league played for four seasons, through 1913 before being interrupted by World War I.

In 1922, the Cotton States League reformed after a nine-year hiatus. The 1923 league folded during the season on July 24, 1923, before resuming the next year. The league played for 11 seasons before folding on July 13, 1932, during the Great Depression.

The next revival of the Cotton States League took place in 1936, and the league played six seasons before folding, as many other minor leagues did when World War II began. This time, it operated as a Class C level league. Following the war, the league was resumed play in 1947 continuing play as Class C level league. The Cotton States League played through the 1955 season before permanently folding following its fifth incarnation in less than half a century. In 1953 the Cotton States League tried to evict the Hot Springs Bathers for attempting to include a black player, Jim Tugerson.

== Cotton States League timeline ==
Cities represented/Teams/Seasons

- Alexandria, Louisiana: Alexandria Reds (1925–1930)
- Baton Rouge, Louisiana: Baton Rouge Cajuns (1902–1906); Baton Rouge Essos (1929); Baton Rouge Highlanders (1930); Baton Rouge Standards (1931); Baton Rouge Senators (1932)
- Brookhaven, Mississippi: Brookhaven Truckers (1924–1925)
- Clarksdale, Mississippi: Clarksdale Swamp Angels (1913): Clarksdale Cubs (1922–1923); Clarksdale Ginners (1936, 1941); Clarksdale Red Sox (1937–1940); Clarksdale Planters (1947–1951)
- Cleveland, Mississippi: Cleveland A's (1936)
- Columbus, Mississippi: Columbus Discoverers (1907–1908); Columbus Joy Riders (1912–1913)
- DeQuincy, Louisiana: DeQuincy Railroaders (1932)
- El Dorado, Arkansas: El Dorado Lions (1929–1932, 1936–1940); El Dorado Oilers (1941, 1947–1955)
- Greenville, Mississippi: Greenville Cotton Pickers (1902, 1904–1905); Greenville Grays (1903); Greenville Bucks (1922); Greenville Swamp Angels (1923); Greenville Bucks (1936–1938); Greenville Buckshots (1939–1941, 1953, 1955); Greenville Tigers (1954)
- Greenwood, Mississippi: Greenwood Scouts (1910–1912; Greenwood Indians (1922–1923); Greenwood Chiefs (1936); Greenwood Giants (1937) Greenwood Dodgers (1938, 1947–1952); Greenwood Crackers (1939); Greenwood Choctaws (1940)
- Gulfport, Mississippi: Gulfport Crabs (1906–1907); Gulfport Tarpons (1926–1928)
- Gulfport, Mississippi/Biloxi, Mississippi: Gulfport-Biloxi Crabs (1908)
- Hattiesburg, Mississippi: Hattiesburg Tar Heels (1905); Hattiesburg Woodpeckers (1910–1911); Hattiesburg Timberjacks (1912); Hattiesburg Hubmen (1923–1924); Hattiesburg Hubbers (1925); Hattiesburg Pinetoppers (1926–1929)
- Helena, Arkansas: Helena Seaporters (1936–1941, 1947–1949)
- Hot Springs, Arkansas: Hot Springs Bathers (1938–1941, 1947–1955)
- Jackson, Mississippi: Jackson Senators (1905–1908, 1912); Jackson Tigers (1910); Jackson Drummers (1911); Jackson Lawmakers (1913); Jackson Senators (1922–1931); Jackson Mississippians (1932); Jackson Senators (1936, 1953)
- Lake Charles, Louisiana: Lake Charles Newporters (1929–1930)
- Laurel, Mississippi: Laurel Lumberjacks (1923–1927); Laurel Cardinals (1928–1929)
- Marshall, Texas: Marshall Tigers (1941)
- Meridian, Mississippi: Meridian White Ribbons (1905–1911); Meridian Metropolitans (1912–1913); Meridian Mets (1925–1929); Meridian Millers (1952–1955)
- Mobile, Alabama: Mobile Sea Gulls (1905–1907)
- Monroe, Louisiana: Monroe Hill Citys (1903–1904); Monroe Municipals (1908); Monroe Drillers (1924–1930); Monroe Twins (1931–1932, 1937); Monroe White Sox (1938–1941); Monroe Sports (1950–1955)
- Natchez, Mississippi: Natchez Indians (1902–1903); Natchez Hill Climbers (1904–1905); Natchez Indians (1948–1953)
- New Orleans, Louisiana: New Orleans Little Pels (1912)
- Opelousas, Louisiana: Opelousas Orphans (1932)
- Pensacola, Florida: Pensacola Snappers (1913)
- Pine Bluff, Arkansas: Pine Bluff Lumbermen (1903–1904); Pine Bluff Judges (1930–1932, 1936–1940); Pine Bluff Cardinals (1948–1949); Pine Bluff Judges (1950–1955)
- Port Arthur, Texas: Port Arthur Refiners (1932)
- Selma, Alabama: Selma Centralites (1913)
- Texarkana, Texas: Texarkana Twins (1941)
- Vicksburg, Mississippi: Vicksburg Hill Billies (1902–1908, 1910–1912, 1922–1932, 1937, 1941, 1955)
- Yazoo City, Mississippi: Yazoo City Zoos (1910–1911); Yazoo City (1912)

== Championship teams ==
=== First stage (1902–1908) ===
- 1902 – Natchez Indians
- 1903 – Baton Rouge Cajuns
- 1904 – Pine Bluff Lumbermen
- 1905 – Greenville Cotton Pickers
- 1906 – Mobile Sea Gulls
- 1907 – Mobile Sea Gulls
- 1908 – Jackson Senators
- 1909 – The league did not play

=== Second stage (1910–1913) ===
- 1910 – Greenwood Scouts
- 1911 – Vicksburg Hill Billies
- 1912 – Vicksburg Hill Billies *
- 1913 – Jackson Lawmakers

* Greenwood Scouts was declared champion as first half champion Vicksburg had disbanded.

- From 1914 through 1921 the league did not play

=== Third stage (1922–1932) ===
- 1922 – Greenwood Indians; Playoff: Greenwood defeated Meridian Mets, 4 games to 0
- 1923 – Greenville Swamp Angels No playoff after the league disbanded
- 1924 – Hattiesburg Hubmen
- 1925 – Meridian Mets
- 1926 – Hattiesburg Pinetoppers
- 1927 – Jackson Red Sox; Playoff: Jackson defeated Monroe Drillers, 4 games to 1
- 1928 – Jackson Red Sox; Playoffs: Hattiesburg Pinetoppers defeated Meridian, 4 games to 1; Vicksburg Hill Billies defeated Jackson, 4 games to 2
  Final series: Vicksburg defeated Hattiesburg, 4 games to 3
- 1929 – Alexandria Reds; Playoffs: El Dorado Lions defeated Laurel Cardinals, 4 games to 1; Jackson Red Sox defeated Alexandria, 4 games to 1
  Final series: El Dorado defeated Jackson, 4 games to 1
- 1930 – Pine Bluff Judges; Playoff: Pine Bluff Judges defeated El Dorado, 4 games to 0
- 1931 – Jackson Red Sox; Playoff: Jackson defeated Vicksburg, 4 games to 0
- 1932 – Baton Rouge Senators; No playoff after the disbanding of the league
- From 1933 through 1935 the league did not play

=== Fourth stage (1936–1941) ===
- 1936 – Greenwood Giants; Playoffs: El Dorado Lions defeated Greenwood, 3 games to 1; Greenville Bucks beat Pine Bluff, 3 games to 1
  Final series: El Dorado beat Greenville, 4 games to 1
- 1937 – Pine Bluff Judges; Playoffs: Pine Bluff beat Greenville, 4 games to 1; El Dorado defeated Greenwood, 4 games to 1
  Final series: El Dorado beat Pine Bluff, 4 games to 1
- 1938 – Greenville Bucks; Playoffs: Monroe White Sox defeated beat Helena, 3 games to 1; Greenville defeated El Dorado, 3 games to 1
  Final series: Monroe beat Greenville, 4 games to 2
- 1939 – Monroe White Sox; Playoffs: Hot Springs Bathers defeated Monroe, 3 games to 2; Greenville Buckshots defeated Clarksdale, 3 games to 1
  Final series: Greenville defeated Hot Springs, 4 games to 1
- 1940 – Monroe White Sox; Playoffs: Monroe defeated Greenville, 3 games to 1; El Dorado Oilers defeated Helena, 3 games to 1
  Final series: Monroe defeated El Dorado, 4 games to 1
- 1941 – Monroe White Sox; Playoffs: Vicksburg Hill Billies defeated Monroe, 3 games to 2; Hot Springs Bathers defeated Greenville, 3 games to 0
  Final series: Hot Springs defeated Vicksburg, 4 games to 0
- From 1942 through 1946 the league did not play

=== Fifth stage (1947–1955) ===
- 1947 – Greenwood Dodgers; Playoffs: Greenwood defeated Clarksdale Cubs, 3 games to 1; Greenville Bucks defeated El Dorado, 3 games to 2
  Final series: Greenwood defeated Greenville, 4 games to 3
- 1948 – Greenwood Dodgers; Playoffs: Greenwood defeated Natchez, 3 games to 0; Hot Springs Bathers defeated Clarksdale, 3 games to 0
  Final series: Hot Springs defeated Greenwood, 4 games to 3
- 1949 – Greenwood Dodgers; Playoffs: Natchez Indians defeated El Dorado, 4 games to 3; Pine Bluff Cardinals defeated Greenwood, 4 games to 2
  Final series: Natchez defeated Pine Bluff, 4 games to 1
- 1950 – Pine Bluff Judges; Playoffs: Hot Springs Bathers defeated Monroe, 4 games to 2; Natchez Indians defeated Pine Bluff, 4 games to1
  Final series: Hot Springs defeated Natchez, 4 games to 3
- 1951 – Monroe Sports; Playoffs: Natchez Indians defeated Monroe, 4 games to 2; Pine Bluff Judges defeated Greenwood, 4 games to 3
  Final series: Natchez defeated Pine Bluff, 4 games to 1
- 1952 – Meridian Millers; Playoffs: Meridian defeated Monroe, 4 games to 2; Natchez Indians defeated Greenwood, 4 games to 2
  Final series: Meridian defeated Natchez, 4 games to 3
- 1953 – Meridian Millers; Playoffs: Meridian defeated Jackson, 4 games to 2; El Dorado Oilers defeated Pine Bluff, 4 games to 0
  Final series: Meridian defeated El Dorado, 4 games to 0
- 1954 – Greenville Tigers; Playoffs: Greenville defeated Monroe, 4 games to 1; El Dorado Oilers defeated Meridian, 4 games to 3
  Final series: El Dorado defeated Greenville, 4 games to 2

== Standings & statistics ==
=== 1902 to 1908 ===
1902 Cotton States League

Team standings	W	L	PCT	GB	Managers
Natchez Indians	55	51	.519	—	George Blackburn
Baton Rouge Cajuns	53	54	.495	2½	Robert Pender
Vicksburg Hill Climbers	52	53	.495	2½	Jesse Reynolds
Greenville Cotton Pickers	53	55	.491	3	Bell Hebron

Player statistics
Player	Team	Stat	Tot
Howard Murphy	Baton Rouge	BA	.400

1903 Cotton States League

Team standings	W	L	PCT	GB	Managers
Baton Rouge Red Sticks	74	42	.638	—	Robert Pender
Vicksburg Hill Billies	70	46	.603	4	Billy Earle
Natchez Indians	59	59	.500	16	Albert Haupt
Pine Bluff Lumbermen	54	60	.474	19	George Blackburn / Frank Christian
Greenville Grays	53	64	.453	21½	William A. Smith
Monroe Hill Citys	36	75	.324	35½	Henry Hunt / Con Strothers; Jim McDermott

Player statistics
Player	Team	Stat	Tot	Player	Team	Stat	Tot
William A. Smith	Greenville	BA	.308	Howie Camnitz	Vicksburg	W	26
Ed Zinram	Natchez	Hits	144	Howie Camnitz	Vicksburg	SO	294
				Howie Camnitz	Vicksburg	Pct	.788; 26–7

1904 Cotton States League

Team standings	W	L	PCT	GB	Managers
Pine Bluff Lumbermen	73	43	.629	—	Bert Blue / George Reed
Vicksburg Hill Climbers	68	48	.586	5	Billy Earle
Monroe Hill Citys	62	56	.525	12	George Leidy
Greenville Cotton Pickers	51	61	.455	20	Bobby Rothermel
Baton Rouge Red Sticks	49	63	.438	22	Robert Pender
Natchez Indians	42	74	.362	31	George Blackburn / William Breitenstein

Player statistics
Player	Team	Stat	Tot	Player	Team	Stat	Tot
Howard Murphy	Pine Bluff	BA	.343	Robert Lee Vernuelle	Pine Bluff	W	24
Ollie Gfroerer	Pine Bluff	Runs	102	Gordon Hickman	Monroe	W	24
Howard Murphy	Pine Bluff	Hits	156	Ross Helm	Monroe	SO	221
Forrest Plass	Vicksburg	SB	72	Walt Deaver	Pine Bluff	Pct	.762; 16–5

1905 Cotton States League

Team standings	W	L	PCT	GB	Managers
Greenville Cotton Pickers	50	25	.667	—	George Reed
Meridian White Ribbons	49	35	.583	5½	Tom Stouch
Pine Bluff Lumbermen	42	31	.575	7	Guy Sample
Jackson Senators	46	37	.554	8	Tommy Reynolds / Ace Stewart
Baton Rouge Cajuns	44	38	.537	9½	Wilson Matthews
Vicksburg Hill Climbers	32	43	.427	18	Frank Belt / Kid Keenan
Hattiesburg Tar Heels	21	46	.313	25	Cooney Best / Perry Werden
Natchez Indians / Mobile Sea Gulls	24	53	.312	27	George Kelley / George Reed

Natchez (18–27) moved to Mobile June 26.
Hattiesburg and Pine Bluff folded July 16. League disbanded July 31, with National Association approval, due to Yellow Fever epidemic.

Player statistics
Player	Team	Stat	Tot	Player	Team	Stat	Tot
Mike Welday	Greenville	BA	.349	Slim Sallee	Meridian	W	10
Mike Welday	Greenville	Runs	62	Slim Sallee	Meridian	Pct	.714; 10–4
Mike Welday	Greenville	Hits	99				

1906 Cotton States League

Team standings	W	L	PCT	GB	Managers
Mobile Sea Gulls	74	44	.627	—	George Reed / Joe Wright; Charles Miller
Meridian Ribboners	65	54	.546	9½	Guy Sample
Jackson Senators	58	60	.492	16	Ace Stewart
Gulfport Crabs	58	61	.487	16½	Eric Miller / John Bolin; Link Stickney
Baton Rouge Cajuns	57	63	.475	18	Bernie McCay
Vicksburg Hill Billies	44	74	.373	30	Billy Earle / Cy Hooker

Player statistics
Player	Team	Stat	Tot	Player	Team	Stat	Tot
Guy Woodruff	Baton Rouge	BA	.314	Robert Lee Venuelle	Mobile	W	26
J.D. Jefferies	Jackson	Runs	73	McCain Robinson	Jackson	SO	197
Curt Gardner	Meridian	Hits	137	Bill Phillips	Mobile	Pct	.917; 11–1

1907 Cotton States League

Team standings	W	L	PCT	GB	Managers
Mobile Sea Gulls	82	52	.612	—	Bernie McCay
Vicksburg Hill Billies	77	57	.575	5	George Blackburn
Jackson Senators	71	62	.534	10½	Harry Salliard / Roy Montgomery
Gulfport Crabs	68	67	.504	14½	Bob Gilks
Meridian White Ribbons	64	70	.478	18	Guy Sample
Columbus Discoverers	42	96	.304	42	Jack Law

Player statistics
Player	Team	Stat	Tot	Player	Team	Stat	Tot
Roy Montgomery	Jackson	BA	.340	William Bruner	Mobile	W	25
Woodie Thornton	Mobile	Runs	76	Jack Ryan	Gulfport	SO	220
Woodie Thornton	Mobile	Hits	150	Rufus Nolley	Mobile	Pct	.767; 23–7

1908 Cotton States League

Team Standings	W	L	PCT	GB	Managers
Jackson Senators	68	42	.618	—	Roy Montgomery
Vicksburg Hill Climbers	66	49	.574	4½	George Blackburn
Gulfport-Biloxi Sand Crabs	63	52	.548	7½	Bob Gilks
Columbus Discoverers	58	56	.509	12	John Toft / Ace Stewart; Bill May / Louis Hall
Meridian White Ribbons	46	68	.404	24	Fred Schmidt / John Hankey; Nig Fuller
Monroe Municipals	41	75	.353	30	Jack Auslet / Dan Collins; W. Dobard

Player statistics
Player	Team	Stat	Tot	Player	Team	Stat	Tot
Frank Manush	Columbus	BA	.296	Al Demaree	Columbus	W	23
Frank Manush	Columbus	Runs	74	Guy Sample	Vicksburg	Pct	.760; 19–6
Frank Manush	Columbus	Hits	136				

The Cotton States League did not play in 1909

=== 1910 to 1913 ===
1910 Cotton States League

Team standings	W	L	PCT	GB	Managers
Greenwood Indians	71	36	.664	-	Walter Thornton
Jackson Tigers	71	37	.658	½	Doc Nance
Hattiesburg Timberjacks	50	60	.455	22½	Link Stickney / John Stamm
Yazoo City Zoos	44	62	.415	26½	Walter Hickey
Vicksburg Hill Billies	46	65	.414	27	Bruce Hayes / Otto Mills
Meridian White Ribbons	45	67	.402	28	Bernie McCay

Player statistics
Player	Team	Stat	Tot	Player	Team	Stat	Tot
Charles Bates	Jackson	BA	.340	Robert Lee Vernuelle	Greenwood	W	24
Bert Graham	Jackson	Runs	91	Bill Sorrells	Jackson	Pct	.742; 23–8
Bert Graham	Jackson	Hits	122				

1911 Cotton States League

Team standings	W	L	PCT	GB	Managers
Vicksburg Hill Billies	73	42	.635	-	Otto Mills
Hattiesburg Woodpeckers	65	51	.560	8½	B.D. Moore / Carlos Smith
Yazoo City Zoos	60	54	.526	12½	Dom Mullaney
Jackson Drummers	58	60	.492	16½	Frank Norcum
Greenwood Scouts	46	68	.404	26½	Woodie Thornton
Meridian White Ribbons	46	73	.387	29	Forrest Plass

Player statistics
Player	Team	Stat	Tot	Player	Team	Stat	Tot
Carlos Smith	Vick/Hatttie	BA	.401	Jim Bagby	Hattiesburg	W	22
Otto Mills	Vicksburg	Runs	87	Joe Martina	Yazoo City	SO	205
Guy Tutweiler	Hattiesburg	Runs	87	Ralph Comstock	Vicksburg	Pct	.840; 21–4
Otto Mills	Vicksburg	Hits	155	Guy Tutweiler	Hattiesburg	HR	11

1912 Cotton States League

Team standings	W	L	PCT	GB	Managers
Vicksburg Hill Billies	66	42	.611	-	Otto Mills
Meridian Metropolitans	52	46	.531	9	Bob Kennedy / Harry Steinfeldt; Orth Collins
Jackson Senators	57	55	.509	11	Roy Montgomery
Hattiesburg Timberjacks / Columbus Joy Riders	56	59	.487	13½	Carlos Smith
Greenwood Scouts*	51	64	.443	18½	Orth Collins / Martin Dudley
New Orleans Little Pels / Yazoo City Zoos	41	57	.418	20	Gene DeMontreville

New Orleans moved to Yazoo City May 9, Yazoo City disbanded August 3; Hattiesburg moved to Columbus June 5; Meridian disbanded August3; Vicksburg disbanded August 13. Playoff: Second half champion Greenwood declared champion after first half champion Vicksburg disbanded.

Player statistics
Player	Team	Stat	Tot	Player	Team	Stat	Tot
J.J. Cox	Yazoo City	BA	.361	Walt Kinney	Vicksburg/Columbus	W	22
Walter Blanchfield	Hatt/Colum	Runs	116	Larry Cheney	NO/YC/Jac	W	22
Walter Blanchfield	Hatt/Colum	Hits	140	Walter Hirsch	Meridian	Pct	1.000; 12–0
Will Kuhn	Vick/Colum	Hits	140				

1913 Cotton States League

Team standings	W	L	PCT	GB	Managers
Jackson Lawmakers	71	24	.748	-	Otto Mills
Pensacola Snappers	67	29	.698	4½	Jimmy Hamilton
Selma Centralites	49	46	.516	22	Arthur Riggs / Harry Spratt
Columbus Joy Riders	40	57	.412	32	Bob Kennedy
Clarksdale Swamp Angels	40	58	.408	32½	Edward Kerr / Carlos Smith
Meridian Metropolitans	22	75	.227	50	Carlos Smith / Walter Hirsch

Season schedule was shortened to August 15. No playoff held.

Player statistics
Player	Team	Stat	Tot	Player	Team	Stat	Tot
Carlos Smith	Merid/Clark	BA	.361	Henry Benn	Pensacola	W	26
Charles Miller	Pensacola	Runs	74	Ed Poole	Columbus	SO	163
Dutch Bernsen	Clarksdale	Hits	117	Henry Benn	Pensacola	Pct	.867; 26–4

=== 1922 to 1927 ===
1922 Cotton States League

Team standings	W	L	PCT	GB	Managers
Greenwood Indians	73	40	.646	-	Charles Bell
Meridian Mets	72	40	.643	½	Frank Kohlbecker
Greenville Bucks	60	56	.517	14½	Buck Stapleton
Vicksburg Hill Billies	56	60	.483	18½	Les Crichlow / Red Torkelson
Clarksdale Cubs	49	70	.412	27	Tommy Toland / Harry Collenberger
Jackson Red Sox	35	79	.307	38½	James Moore / Red McDermott; Jack Steele

Playoff: Greenwood 4 games, Meridian 0

Player statistics
Player	Team	Stat	Tot	Player	Team	Stat	Tot
Frank Kohlbecker	Meridian	BA	.324	Hugh Boyd	Greenwood	W	24
Jake Propst	Greenwood	Runs	75	Dee Hunter	Meridian	SO	163
William Waldron	Greenwood	Runs	75	Win Ballou	Vicksburg	Pct	.818; 9–2
William Waldron	Greenwood	Hits	141				
William Waldron	Greenwood	HR	4				

1923 Cotton States League

Team standings	W	L	PCT	GB	Managers
Greenville Swamp Angels	46	35	.563	-	Hal Irelan
Laurel Lumberjacks	43	35	.544	1½	Charles Hodge / Bill Statham
Greenwood Indians	43	35	.544	1½	Tom Toland
Clarksdale Cubs	41	38	.519	4	Baxter Sparks
Jackson Red Sox	37	40	.489	7	Charles Bell
Vicksburg Hill Billies	37	43	.481	8½	Cy Slapnicka / Ollie Mills
Meridian Mets	36	43	.456	9	John Jones/ Bill Bongeno
Hattiesburg Hubmen	31	45	.408	12½	Red Torkelson / Fred Smith

The league disbanded July 24.

Player statistics
Player	Team	Stat	Tot	Player	Team	Stat	Tot
Art Bourg	Laurel	BA	.370	Bill Statham	Laurel	W	17
Leonard Glassbrenner	Clarksdale	Runs	56	Bill Statham	Laurel	Pct	.773; 17–5
Chap Marable	Greenville	Hits	93				

1924 Cotton States League

Team standings	W	L	PCT	GB	Managers
Hattiesburg Hubmen	64	33	.660	-	Herschel Bobo
Monroe Drillers	59	39	.602	5½	Bill Wise / Rip Ripperton
Jackson Red Sox	46	52	.469	18½	Nemo Cannon / Buck Stapleton
Brookhaven Truckers	43	50	.462	19	Sammy Vick
Laurel Lumberjacks	43	57	.430	22½	Baxter Sparks / Pat Boyd; Ed McDonald
Vicksburg Hill Billies	38	62	.380	27½	Red Torkelson / Ollie Mills; Doc Johnston / Grady Adkins

Player statistics
Player	Team	Stat	Tot	Player	Team	Stat	Tot
Clyde Freeman	Jackson	BA	.366	Al Williamson	Hattiesburg	W	21
Herschel Bobo	Hattiesburg	Runs	91	Chief Youngblood	Brookhaven	SO	131
Charlie Gibson	Hattiesburg	Hits	141	Al Williamson	Hattiesburg	Pct	.808; 21–5
Sammy Vick	Brookhaven	HR	16				

1925 Cotton States League

Team standings	W	L	PCT	GB	Managers
Meridian Mets	71	53	.573	-	Dutch Quellmalz / Lester Patterson
Hattiesburg Hubbers	70	53	.569	½	Herschel Bobo
Jackson Red Sox	68	54	.557	2	Bill Pierre / Fred Heck
Vicksburg Hill Billies	60	62	.492	10	Runt Marr
Laurel Lumberjacks	58	64	.475	12	Jake Propst / Jim Moore; Pat Devereaux / Sammy Vick
Monroe Drillers	56	65	.463	13½	Bill Wise / Paul Trammell
Brookhaven Truckers	56	69	.448	15½	Tom Toland / Tex Covington
Alexandria Reds	51	70	.421	18½	Patsy Flaherty / Phil Wells

Player statistics
Player	Team	Stat	Tot	Player	Team	Stat	Tot
Charles Gibson	Hattiesburg	BA	.351	Jim Patterson	Meridian	W	19
J. Poland	Hattiesburg	Runs	90	Stan Anderson	Meridian	SO	168
Charles Gibson	Hattiesburg	Hits	164	Roger Williams	Jackson	Pct	.733; 11–4
Herschel Bobo	Hattiesburg	HR	17				
Mel Simons	Meridian	3B	21				

1926 Cotton States League

Team Standings	W	L	PCT	GB	Managers
Hattiesburg Pinetoppers	77	46	.626	-	Herschel Bobo
Meridian Mets	67	57	.540	10½	Spoke Emery
Jackson Red Sox	65	64	.504	15	Frank Heck / Ray Gilwater; Walter Barbare
Alexandria Reds	64	65	.496	16	Bill Pierre
Laurel Lumberjacks	59	61	.492	16½	Sammy Vick / Bill Statham
Gulfport Tarpons	57	67	.460	20½	Cotton Knaupp / Jack Ryan; Clarence Nimitz
Vicksburg Hill Billies	58	71	.450	22	Bob Clark / Bunny Fabrique
Monroe Drillers	56	72	.438	23½	Chick Carroll / L.M. Hollocher; Eddie Palmer

Playoffs: None were played due to second half irregularities.

Player statistics
Player	Team	Stat	Tot	Player	Team	Stat	Tot
Sammy Vick	Hattiesburg	BA	.376	Ed Greer	Meridian	W	24
Sammy Mack	Hattiesburg	Runs	98	Lester Rouprich	Gulf/Jacks	SO	146
Charles Gibson	Hattiesburg	Runs	98	Merle Settlemire	Meridian	Pct	.875; 14–2
Mel Simons	Meridian	Hits	161				
George Ferrell	Monroe	HR	20				

1927 Cotton States League

Team standings	W	L	PCT	GB	Managers
Jackson Red Sox	76	47	.618	-	Walter Barbare
Monroe Drillers	74	48	.607	1½	Eddie Palmer
Hattiesburg Pinetoppers	68	52	.557	6½	Herschel Bobo
Alexandria Reds	59	60	.496	15	Bill Pierre / Sam Barnes
Gulfport Tarpons	57	64	.471	18	Joe Evans
Vicksburg Hill Billies	54	70	.435	22½	Bunny Fabrique / John Wooley
Meridian Mets	48	66	.421	23½	Spoke Emery / Cotton Klindworth
Laurel Lumberjacks	41	70	.369	29	Frank Matthews / Buck Stapleton

Playoff: Jackson 4 games, Monroe 1.

Player statistics
Player	Team	Stat	Tot	Player	Team	Stat	Tot
Charles Gibson	Hattiesburg	BA	.358	Ed Greer	Jackson	W	23
Fred Polvogt	Alexandria	Runs	94	Wayne LaMaster	Jackson	SO	139
Joe Granade	Monroe	Hits	180	Philip Hensick	Monroe	Pct	.759; 22–7
Charles Gibson	Hattiesburg	HR	12				

=== 1928 to 1932 ===
1928 Cotton States League

Team standings	W	L	PCT	GB	Managers
Jackson Red Sox	77	45	.631	-	Snipe Conley / Buck Stapleton
Meridian Mets	71	52	.577	6½	Howie Camp / Dee Payne
Hattiesburg Pinetoppers	66	52	.559	9	Herschel Bobo
Vicksburg Hill Billies	67	56	.545	10½	Bob Taggert / Wray Query
Monroe Drillers	64	56	.533	12	Eddie Palmer
Gulfport Tarpons	50	65	.435	23½	Cotton Knaupp
Laurel Cardinals	44	78	.361	33	John Ganzel / Bobby Schang
Alexandria Reds	42	77	.353	33½	Sam Barnes / Frank Karpp

Playoff: Vicksburg 4 games, Hattiesburg 3.

Player statistics
Player	Team	Stat	Tot	Player	Team	Stat	Tot
Mike Powers	Gulf/Jack	BA	.383	Ed Greer	Jackson	W	20
Joe Granade	Monroe	Runs	96	Ed Durham	Jackson	SO	114
Joe Granade	Monroe	Hits	174	Charlie Perkins	Meridian	Pct	.800; 16–4
Mike Powers	Gulf/Jack	Hits	174				
Horace Long	Jackson	HR	21				

1929 Cotton States League

Team Standings	W	L	PCT	GB	Managers
Alexandria Reds	74	50	.597	-	Pete Kilduff
Jackson Senators	70	57	.551	5½	Herschel Bobo
El Dorado Lions	66	55	.545	6½	George Jackson
Laurel Cardinals	59	63	.484	14	Clay Hopper
Hattiesburg Pinetoppers / Baton Rouge Essos	57	61	.483	14	Dee Cousineau / Bill Pierre
Monroe Drillers	55	63	.466	16	Art Ewold / Tillie Metteer; John Kane
Vicksburg Hill Billies	55	68	.447	18½	Wray Query
Meridian Mets / Lake Charles Newporters	51	70	.421	21½	Jake Hurt

Hattiesburg (15–19) moved to Baton Rouge May 30; Meridian (23–27) moved to Lake Charles June 17 Playoff: El Dorado 4 games, Jackson 3.

Player statistics
Player	Team	Stat	Tot	Player	Team	Stat	Tot
Joe Granade	Monroe	BA	.367	Joe Berry	Vicksburg	W	21
Odell Hale	Monroe	Runs	116	Gus Burleson	El Dorado	SO	114
Joe Hutcheson	Jackson	Hits	171	Joe Berry	Vicksburg	ERA	2.66
Stormy Davis	Lake Charles	HR	28	Leon Petit; Decatur Jones	El Dorado; Jackson	PCT	.750 15–5.750 12–4

1930 Cotton States League

Team standings	W	L	PCT	GB	Managers
El Dorado Lions	83	51	.619	-	George Jackson
Monroe Drillers	67	61	.523	13	Jim Bagby / Clarence Huber
Pine Bluff Judges	68	63	.519	13½	Wray Query
Baton Rouge Highlanders	68	65	.511	14½	H.E. "Babe" Irwin
Jackson Senators	64	68	.485	18	Herschel Bobo
Vicksburg Hill Billies	48	82	.369	33	John Brock / Rod Murphy; John King
Alexandria Reds	35	30	.538	NA	Josh Billings
Lake Charles Newporters	24	37	.393	NA	Al Nixon / Clyde Glass

Alexandria & Lake Charles disbanded June 17 Playoff: Pine Bluff 4 games, El Dorado 3.

Player statistics
Player	Team	Stat	Tot	Player	Team	Stat	Tot
Dick Luckey	Alex/Monroe	BA	.358	Tex Nugent	El Dorado	W	21
Buster Wisrock	El Dorado	Hits	181	Jackie Reid	El Dorado	SO	181
Thomas Morris	Jackson	Runs	112	John Singleton	Vicksburg	ERA	3.11
Ralph Winegarner	El Dorado	RBI	128	Tex Nugent	El Dorado	PCT	.724 21–8
Ralph Winegarner	El Dorado	HR	40				

1931 Cotton States League

Team standings	W	L	PCT	GB	Managers
Jackson Senators	79	45	.637	-	Herschel Bobo
Vicksburg Hill Billies	66	52	.559	10	Joe Schepner
Pine Bluff Judges	62	62	.500	17	Wray Query
Baton Rouge Standards	58	62	.483	19	Joe Martina / Bud Davis
Monroe Twins	54	66	.450	23	Eddie Palmer / Frank Meyers; Ted Jourdan
El Dorado Lions	44	76	.367	33	George Jackson

Playoff: Jackson 4 games, Vicksburg 0.

Player statistics
Player	Team	Stat	Tot	Player	Team	Stat	Tot
Hugh Ferrell	Jackson	BA	.345	Gus Burleson	El Dorado/Monroe	W	20
Herschel Bobo	Jackson	Runs	103	Abe White	Monroe	SO	163
Hugh Ferrell	Jackson	Hits	161	Abe White	Monroe	ERA	2.56
Stormy Davis	Pine Bluff	RBI	100	Jackie Reid	Jacksonville	PCT	.762 16–5
Horace Long	Jackson	HR	17				

1932 Cotton States League

Team standings	W	L	PCT	GB	Managers
Baton Rouge Senators	51	20	.718	-	Josh Billings
Pine Bluff Judges	39	29	.574	10½	Wray Query
Vicksburg Hill Billies / Jackson Mississippians	30	33	.476	17	Don McShane / Buck Stapleton; Joe Schepner
El Dorado Lions	33	36	.478	17	George Jackson / Clyde Glass
Monroe Twins	30	37	.448	19	Pop Kitchens / Clay Hopper
Port Arthur Refiners / DeQuincy Railroaders / Opelousas Orphans	17	45	.274	29½	Frank Meyers / Cecil Jones / Milt Delmas

Vicksburg moved to Jackson June 1.; Port Arthur moved to DeQuincy June 19; DeQuincy moved to Opelousas July 7. League disbanded July 13.

Player statistics
Player	Team	Stat	Tot	Player	Team	Stat	Tot
Clyde Glass	El Dorado	BA	.416	Otho Nitcholas	Baton Rouge	W	12
Earl Persons	Pine Bluff	Runs	65	Gus Burleson	El Dorado	SO	87
Calvin Chapman	Baton Rouge	Hits	93	Arthur Galeria	Pine Bluff	ERA	2.33
Horace Long	El Dorado	HR	12	Otho Nitcholas	Baton Rouge	PCT	.857 12–2

=== 1936 to 1941 ===
1936 Cotton States League

Team standings	W	L	PCT	GB	Managers
Greenwood Giants	79	61	.564	-	Frank Brazill
Greenville Bucks	78	62	.557	1	Lena Styles
Pine Bluff Judges	77	62	.554	1½	Cowboy Jones
El Dorado Lions	75	64	.540	3½	Frank O'Rourke
Helena Seaporters	68	70	.493	10	Rod Whitney
Jackson Senators	66	71	.482	11½	Guy Lacey
Cleveland A's	57	80	.416	20½	Slim Brewer / Mays Copeland
Clarksdale Ginners	54	84	.391	24	Harry Strohm / Slim Brewer

Playoffs: El Dorado 3 games, Greenwood 1; Greenville 3 games, Pine Bluff 1. Finals: El Dorado 4 games, Greenville 1.

Player statistics
Player	Team	Stat	Tot	Player	Team	Stat	Tot
Curt Sutherlin	Clarksdale	BA	.364	Whitey Moore	El Dorado	W	20
Doodle Harper	Helena	Runs	120	Les Willis	Pine Bluff	W	20
Curt Sutherlin	Clarksdale	Hits	190	Whitey Moore	El Dorado	SO	2.44
Milt Stroner	El Dorado	RBI	131	Tom Ferrick	Greenwood	ERA	2.17
Milt Stroner	El Dorado	HR	29	Whitey Moore	El Dorado	PCT	.800 20–5

1937 Cotton States League

Team standings	W	L	PCT	GB	Managers
Pine Bluff Judges	87	51	.630	-	Cowboy Jones
El Dorado Lions	78	62	.557	10	Frank O'Rourke
Greenwood Giants	76	62	.551	11	Frank Brazill
Greenville Bucks	72	66	.522	15	Lena Styles
Helena Seaporters	70	69	.504	17½	Rod Whitney
Clarksdale Red Sox	64	76	.457	24	Red Barnes
Vicksburg Hill Billies	55	84	.396	32½	Ray Brubaker / Al Libke
Monroe Twins	53	85	.384	34	Ed Hock / Walt Butler / Buford Rhea

Playoffs: Pine Bluff 4 games, Greenville 1; El Dorado 4 games, Greenwood 2. Finals: El Dorado 4 games, Pine Bluff 1.

Player statistics
Player	Team	Stat	Tot	Player	Team	Stat	Tot
Harry Chozen	El Dorado	BA	.339	Henry Zajac	Pine Bluff	W	24
Jack C. Murphy	Pine Bluff	Runs	125	Les Willis	Pine Bluff	SO	200
Larry Kinzer	Greenville	Hits	169	Henry Zajac	Pine Bluff	ERA	2.59
Kermit Lewis	El Dorado	Hits	169	Henry Zajac	Pine Bluff	PCT	.800 24–6
Larry Kinzer	Greenville	RBI	123				
Kermit Lewis	El Dorado	HR	26				

1938 Cotton States League

Team standings	W	L	PCT	GB	Managers
Greenville Bucks	88	50	.638	-	Jimmy Powell
Helena Seaporters	80	57	.584	7½	Riggs Stephenson
Monroe White Sox	78	60	.565	10	Luther Harvel / Doug Taitt
El Dorado Lions	74	61	.548	12½	Frank O'Rourke
Clarksdale Red Sox	66	71	.482	21½	Nemo Leibold
Pine Bluff Judges	60	73	.451	25½	Cowboy Jones
Greenwood Dodgers	55	83	.399	33	Elmer Yoter
Hot Springs Bathers	45	91	.331	42	Miles Hunter/ Hal Grant / Joe Barnett

Playoffs: Monroe 3 games, Helena 1; Greenville 3 games, El Dorado 1. Finals: Monroe 4 games, Greenville 2.

Player statistics
Player	Team	Stat	Tot	Player	Team	Stat	Tot
Pudge Powers	El Dorado	BA	.345	Chuck Hawley	El Dorado	W	22
Rudy Tone	El Dorado	Runs	139	Chuck Hawley	El Dorado	SO	174
Kirby Farrell	Greenville	Hits	182	Tom Perry	Monroe	ERA	1.71
Pudge Powers	El Dorado	RBI	111	Tom Perry	Monroe	Pct	.895; 17–2
Jay Kirke, Jr.	Pine Bluff	HR	18				
Buford Rhea	Monroe	SB	79				

1939 Cotton States League

Team standings	W	L	PCT	GB	Attend	Managers
Monroe White Sox	92	46	.667	-	51,945	Doug Taitt
Clarksdale Red Sox	77	63	.550	16	56,284	Cowboy Jones
Greenwood Crackers	71	63	.530	19	41,873	Cecil Rhodes
Hot Springs Bathers	71	67	.514	21	33,810	Conrad Fisher
Greenville Buckshots	61	75	.449	30	30,958	Harry Whitehouse / Paul Archiopoli / James Powell
El Dorado Lions	59	75	.440	31	32,291	Frank O'Rourke
Pine Bluff Judges	57	76	.429	32½	23,555	Jimmie Sherlin / Andy Cohen
Helena Seaporters	58	81	.417	34½	19,986	Buster Blakeney

Playoffs: Hot Springs 3 games, Monroe 2; Greenville 3 games, Clarksdale 1. Finals: Greenville 4 games, Hot Springs 1.

Player statistics
Player	Team	Stat	Tot	Player	Team	Stat	Tot
Steve Carter	Hot Springs	BA	.369	John Yelovic	Monroe	W	21
Andy Gilbert	Clarksdale	Runs	136	Earl Harrist	El Dorado	SO	223
John Rowe	Helena	Hits	202	James Hogan	Helena	ERA	3.14
Steve Carter	Hot Springs	RBI	132	Kelton Maxfield	Monroe	PCT	.800 16–4
Al Gardella	Hot Springs	HR	32				

1940 Cotton States League

Team standings	W	L	PCT	GB	Managers
Monroe White Sox	82	45	.646	-	Doug Taitt
El Dorado Lions	78	57	.578	8	Guy Sturdy
Helena Seaporters	71	60	.542	13	Bud Clancy
Greenville Buckshots	70	69	.504	18	Andy Reese
Hot Springs Bathers	67	71	.486	20½	Cecil Coombs
Clarksdale Red Sox	61	75	.449	25½	Cowboy Jones
Greenwood Choctaws	58	76	.433	27½	L.B. Jones / Walter Carson / Nig Lipscombe Jr.
Pine Bluff Judges	49	83	.371	35½	Red Rollings

Playoffs: Monroe 3 games, Greenville 1; El Dorado 3 games, Helena 1. Finals: Monroe 4 games, El Dorado 1.

Player statistics
Player	Team	Stat	Tot	Player	Team	Stat	Tot
Thurman Tucker	Clarksdale	BA	.390	Tom Perry	Monroe	W	21
Monte Duncan	Hot Springs	Runs	127	Carl Wentz	El Dorado	SO	238
Jack Grantham	Clarksdale	Hits	194	Tom Perry	Greenville	ERA	2.96
Eddie Zydowsky	Hot Springs	RBI	157	Lloyd Finck	Helena	PCT	.800 20–5
Monte Duncan	Hot Springs	HR	25				
Eddie Zydowsky	Hot Springs	HR	25				

1941 Cotton States League

Team standings	W	L	PCT	GB	Managers
Monroe White Sox	83	55	.601	-	Doug Taitt
Hot Springs Bathers	77	60	.562	5½	Mike Powers
Greenville Buckshots	76	63	.547	7½	Dave Coble
Vicksburg Hill Billies	76	64	.543	8	Rip Fanning / Al Baker
Helena Seaporters	72	66	.522	11	Jimmy Adair
Texarkana Twins	65	73	.471	18	Walter Kopp / Jake Atz Jr.
El Dorado Oilers	54	82	.397	28	Ray Rice / Guy Sturdy / Sam Hancock
Clarksdale Ginners / Marshall Tigers	48	88	.353	34	Cowboy Jones / Guy Sturdy

Clarksdale (33–47) moved to Marshall July 10. Playoffs: Vicksburg 3 games, Monroe 2; Hot Springs 3 games, Greenville 0; Finals: Hot Springs 4 games, Vicksburg 0.

Player statistics
Player	Team	Stat	Tot	Player	Team	Stat	Tot
Roy Bueschen	Greenville	BA	.370	Alfred Kelley	Vicksburg	W	22
Colman Powell	Hot Springs	Runs	137	Bill Reeder	Monroe	SO	189
Roy Marion	Hot Springs	Hits	207	Charles Pescod	Hot Springs	ERA	3.00
Mike Powers	Hot Springs	RBI	137				
Merv Connors	Texarcana	HR	29				

=== 1947 to 1955 ===
1947 Cotton States League

Team standings	W	L	PCT	GB	Attend	Managers
Greenwood Dodgers	92	38	.708	-	68,746	Jim Bivin
Greenville Bucks	84	46	.646	8	53,887	Harry Chozen
El Dorado Oilers	61	69	.469	31	42,957	James Cookson
Clarksdale Planters	59	71	.454	33	50,136	Calvin Chapman
Hot Springs Bathers	49	81	.377	43	41,818	Joe Santomauro
Helena Seaporters	45	85	.346	47	24,510	Herschel Bobo

Playoffs: Greenwood 3 games, Clarksdale 1; Greenville 3 games, El Dorado 2. Finals: Greenwood 4 games, Greenville 3.

Player statistics
Player	Team	Stat	Tot	Player	Team	Stat	Tot
Ernest Davis	El Dorado	BA	.340	Leslie Edwards	Greenville	W	21
Robert Lee	Greenwood	Runs	102	Russ Oppliger	Greenwood	W	21
Paul Mauldin	Clarksdale	Runs	102	Bob Schultz	Greenville	SO	274
H.G. Talbert	Helena	Runs	102	Billy Briggs	Greenville	ERA	1.93
James Cookson	El Dorado	Hits	164	Leslie Edwards	Greenville	PCT	.808 21–5
Floyd Fogg	Clarksdale	RBI	112				
Floyd Fogg	Clarksdale	HR	27				

1948 Cotton States League

Team standings	W	L	PCT	GB	Attend	Managers
Greenwood Dodgers	92	44	.676	-	48,847	Jim Bivin
Clarksdale Planters	85	53	.616	8	63,883	Chet Morgan
Hot Springs Bathers	82	56	.594	11	83,425	Joe Holden / George Sobek
Natchez Indians	74	64	.536	19	38,069	Joe Rullo
Greenville Bucks	65	73	.471	28	53,499	Lindsay Deal / Wes Livengood
Helena Seaporters	54	82	.397	38	31,292	Woody Johnson / Tince Leonard / Michael Sertich
Pine Bluff Cardinals	50	87	.365	42½	58,342	Arthur Nelson / John George
El Dorado Oilers	48	91	.345	45½	36,273	Howard Roberts

Playoffs: Greenwood 3 games, Natchez 0; Hot Springs 3 games, Clarksdale 0. Finals: Hot Springs 4 games, Greenwood 3.

Player statistics
Player	Team	Stat	Tot	Player	Team	Stat	Tot
Herb Adams	Hot Springs	BA	.375	Bob Upton	Clarksdale	W	21
Herb Adams	Hot Springs	Runs	123	Ed Albrecht	Pine Bluff	SO	195
Herb Adams	Hot Springs	Hits	223	Labe Dean	Greenwood	ERA	1.34
Jack Parks	Natchez	RBI	96	Donald Otten	Greenwood	PCT	.842 16–3
Jack Parks	Natchez	HR	22				

1949 Cotton States League

Team standings	W	L	PCT	GB	Attend	Managers
Greenwood Dodgers	84	56	.600	-	53,228	Jim Bivin
El Dorado Oilers	80	59	.576	3½	56,780	Jim McClure
Natchez Indians	73	66	.533	10½	35,168	Joe Rullo
Pine Bluff Cardinals	72	66	.522	11	82,442	Harry Chozen
Greenville Bucks	72	67	.518	11½	60,371	Jim Acton
Hot Springs Bathers	64	75	.460	19½	48,563	Pete Fox / Glen Stewart
Clarksdale Planters	58	80	.420	25	56,363	Red Davis / Chet Morgan / Clint Dahlberg
Helena Seaporters	53	87	.378	31	34,468	Ray Baker / John A. McPherson / Bob Benish

Playoffs: Natchez 4 games, El Dorado 3; Pine Bluff 4 games, Greenwood 2. Finals: Natchez 4 games, Pine Bluff 1.

Player statistics
Player	Team	Stat	Tot	Player	Team	Stat	Tot
Harold Seawright	Greenville	BA	.325	Ed Albrecht	Pine Bluff	W	29
Ed Sudol	El Dorado	Runs	106	Ed Albrecht	Pine Bluff	SO	389
Harold Seawright	Greenville	Hits	172	Stan Poloczyk	Greenwood	ERA	1.82
Harold Seawright	Greenville	RBI	108	Fred Waters	Greenwood	PCT	.750 18–6
Dan Phalen	Hot Springs	HR	22				

1950 Cotton States League

Team standings	W	L	PCT	GB	Attend	Managers
Pine Bluff Judges	84	54	.609	-	94,902	Harry Chozen
Monroe Sports	81	56	.591	2½	80,814	Al Mazur
Hot Springs Bathers	77	60	.562	6½	61,153	John Antonelli
Natchez Indians	78	61	.561	6½	44,310	Dick Adkins
Greenwood Dodgers	69	69	.500	15	35,140	Lou Rochelli
Greenville Bucks	63	75	.457	21	45,885	Joe Rullo
Clarksdale Planters	62	76	.449	22	47,340	Chet Morgan
El Dorado Oilers	38	101	.273	46½	25,703	Ray Schalk

Playoffs: Hot Springs 4 games, Monroe 2; Natchez 4 games, Pine Bluff 1. Finals: Hot Springs 4 games, Natchez 3.

Player statistics
Player	Team	Stat	Tot	Player	Team	Stat	Tot
Ben Cantrell	Pine Bluff	BA	.363	Cliff Coggin	Monroe	W	21
Harry Schwegman	Pine Bluff	Runs	150	Ryne Duren	Pine Bluff	SO	233
Ben Cantrell	Pine Bluff	Hits	189	Ronald Lurk	Monroe	ERA	1.55
Ben Cantrell	Pine Bluff	RBI	144	Cliff Coggin	Monroe	PCT	.805 21–5
Dick Adkins	Natchez	HR	25				

1951 Cotton States League

Team standings	W	L	PCT	GB	Attend	Managers
Monroe Sports	89	51	.636	-	70,262	Al Mazur
Greenwood Dodgers	83	57	.593	6	44,051	Lou Rochelli
Pine Bluff Judges	82	58	.586	7	63,218	Bob Richards
Natchez Indians	79	61	.564	10	57,844	Jorge Torres
El Dorado Oilers	77	62	.554	11½	63,009	Bill McGhee
Hot Springs Bathers	53	86	.381	35½	40,564	Rex Carr
Clarksdale Planters	53	87	.379	36	31,050	Jim Pruett / Herschel Bobo / Rudy Regelsky / Joseph Kopach
Greenville Bucks	43	97	.307	46	26,082	Charlie Biggs / Lawrence Bucynski

Playoffs: Natchez 4 games, Monroe 3; Pine Bluff 4 games, Greenwood 3. Finals: Natchez 4 games, Pine Bluff 1.

Player statistics
Player	Team	Stat	Tot	Player	Team	Stat	Tot
James Gilbert	Natchez	BA	.352	Billy Muffett	Monroe	W	22
Fred Boiko	Pine Bluff	Runs	125	Vachel Perkins	Pine Bluff	W	22
Fred Boiko	Pine Bluff	Hits	182	William Black	Pine Bluff	SO	171
Steve Molinari	Pine Bluff	RBI	106	Billy Muffett	Monroe	ERA	2.25
Peter Konyar	Pine Bluff	HR	27	Fred Waters	Greenwood	PCT	.917 11–1

1952 Cotton States League

Team standings	W	L	PCT	GB	Attend	Managers
Meridian Millers	78	48	.619	-	61,487	Thomas Davis
Natchez Indians	73	53	.579	5	50,345	Homer Ray Wilson / Troy Mitchell
Greenwood Dodgers	70	56	.556	8	52,067	Stan Wasiak
Monroe Sports	66	60	.524	12	59,128	Fred Harrington
El Dorado Oilers	65	61	.516	13	65,909	Jimmy Morgan / Ray Perry
Pine Bluff Judges	62	64	.492	16	45,749	Hillis Layne
Greenville Bucks	47	79	.373	31	37,918	Harry Chozen
Hot Springs Bathers	43	83	.341	35	37,796	Bob Benish / James Hogan

Playoffs: Meridian 4 games, Monroe 2; Natchez 4 games, Greenwood 2. Finals: Meridian 4 games, Natchez 3.

Player statistics
Player	Team	Stat	Tot	Player	Team	Stat	Tot
Don Allen	Natchez	BA	.335	Bob Harrison	Meridian	W	24
Gene Pompelia	Meridian	Runs	102	John Forizs	Greenwood	SO	252
John Jones	Monroe	Hits	163	Bob Harrison	Meridian	ERA	1.82
John Jones	Monroe	RBI	91	Bob Harrison	Meridian	PCT	.828 24–5
Ray Perry	El Dorado	HR	15				

1953 Cotton States League

Team standings	W	L	PCT	GB	Attend	Managers
Meridian Millers	79	46	.632	-	59,514	Thomas Davis
El Dorado Oilers	67	59	.532	12½	47,938	Bill Adair
Pine Bluff Judges	65	60	.520	14	43,276	Frank Lucchesi
Jackson Senators	63	61	.508	15½	43,805	Marland Doolittle
Hot Springs Bathers	63	61	.508	15½	43,360	Vern Shetler
Greenville Bucks	63	62	.504	16	51,090	Charles Lindquist / Chet Morgan / Bill Vaughn
Natchez Indians	50	75	.400	29	20,424	Wayne Tucker
Monroe Sports	50	76	.397	29½	40,918	Fred Harrington

Jackson defeated Hot Springs 6–2 in a one-game playoff for fourth place. Playoffs: Meridian 4 games, Jackson 2; El Dorado 4 games, Pine Bluff 0. Finals: Meridian 4 games, El Dorado 0.

Player statistics
Player	Team	Stat	Tot	Player	Team	Stat	Tot
Hugh Glaze	Meridian	BA	.355	Bob Harrison	Meridian	W	19
Harold Martin	Hot Springs	Runs	127	Bob Harrison	Meridian	SO	172
Harold Martin	Hot Springs	Hits	169	Bob Harrison	Meridian	ERA	2.15
Harold Martin	Hot Springs	RBI	111	Clyde Baldwin	Hot Springs	PCT	.722 13–5
Harold Martin	Hot Springs	HR	41				

1954 Cotton States League

Team standings	W	L	PCT	GB	Attend	Managers
Greenville Tigers	80	39	.672	-	48,372	Willis Hudlin
El Dorado Oilers	79	39	.669	½	36,115	Bill Adair
Meridian Millers	62	56	.525	17½	33,598	Thomas Davis
Monroe Sports	53	67	.442	27½	30,961	Ed Head
Pine Bluff Judges	47	71	.398	32½	24,196	Frank Lucchesi / Bill Enos
Hot Springs Bathers	35	84	.294	45	24,245	Paul Dean / Jackie Bales / Louis Lucas

Playoffs: Greenville 4 games, Monroe 1; El Dorado 4 games, Meridian 3. Finals: El Dorado 4 games, Greenville 2.

Player statistics
Player	Team	Stat	Tot	Player	Team	Stat	Tot
Frank Walenga	El Dorado	BA	.382	Roy Jayne	Meridian	W	20
Banks McDowell	Greenville	Runs	121	Bobby J. Brown	El Dorado	W	20
Frank Walenga	El Dorado	Hits	174	Bill Halley	Monroe	SO	176
Frank Walenga	El Dorado	RBI	125	Jerry Dean	Greenville	ERA	1.80
Pelham Austin	El Dorado	HR	28	Jerry Dean	Greenville	PCT	.882 15–2

1955 Cotton States League

Team standings	W	L	PCT	GB	Attend	Managers
Monroe Sports	76	41	.650	-	57,704	Ed Head
El Dorado Oilers	70	50	.583	7½	40,512	Salty Parker
Pine Bluff Judges / Meridian Millers	59	56	.513	16	37,959	Robert Knoke / Merrill Smith
Hot Springs Bathers	57	62	.479	20	25,550	Joe Lutz / Mickey O'Neil
Greenville Bucks	49	69	.415	27½	30,641	Willis Hudlin / Luther Tucker; Banks McDowell / Dan Ryan
Vicksburg Hill Billies	43	76	.361	34	35,995	Papa Williams

Pine Bluff moved to Meridian June 16. Playoffs: Monroe 4 games, Hot Springs 0; El Dorado 4 games, Meridian 1. Finals: Monroe 4 games, El Dorado 3.

Player statistics
Player	Team	Stat	Tot	Player	Team	Stat	Tot
Jim Davenport	El Dorado	BA	.363	Richard Malbouer	El Dorado	W	17
Bob Maness	Monroe	Runs	109	Richard Malbouer	El Dorado	SO	197
Jim Davenport	El Dorado	Hits	147	Edward Dick	Monroe	ERA	1.77
Bob Maness	Monroe	Hits	147	Bill Drummond	Monroe	PCT	.764 13–4
Marshall Gilbert	Monroe	RBI	101				
Marshall Gilbert	Monroe	HR	19				
