= Gulfport Tarpons =

- 1906–1928; (1906–1908, 1926–1928); Gulfport, Mississippi

Minor league affiliations
- Class: Class D (1906–1908, 1926–1928)
- League: Cotton States League (1906–1908, 1926–1928)

Major league affiliations
- Team: None

Minor league titles
- League titles (0): None
- Conference titles (0): None

Team data
- Name: Gulfport Crabs (1906–1907); Gulfport-Biloxi Sand Crabs (1908); Gulfport Tarpons (1926–1928)
- Ballpark: Fair Grounds (1926–1928)

The Gulfport Tarpons were a minor league baseball team based in Gulfport, Mississippi. Gulfport teams played exclusively as members of the Class D level Cotton States League. The Gulfport "Crabs" teams played in the league from 1906 to 1908, with the Tarpons playing from 1926 to 1928. The Tarpons hosted home minor league games at the Fair Grounds.

== History ==
=== 1906 to 1908: Cotton States League ===
Gulfport, Mississippi first hosted minor league baseball in 1906 when the Gulfport Crabs became members of the six–team Class D level Cotton States League. The Baton Rouge Cajuns, Jackson Senators, Meridian White Ribbons, Mobile Sea Gulls and Vicksburg Hill Billies teams joined Gulfport in 1906 league play.

On April 19, 1906, the Gulfport Crabs began league play in their first season of minor league baseball. With a record of 58–61, Gulfport placed fourth in the six–team Cotton States League final standings. Gulfport ended the season 16.5 games behind the first place Mobile Sea Gulls in the final standings. The Cotton States League did not hold post-season playoffs. The Crabs were managed during the season by Eric Miller, John Bolin and Link Stickney.

The 1907 season saw The Cotton States League continue play as a six–team Class D league. The Gulfport Crabs ended the 1907 Cotton States League season schedule with a record of 68–67, placing fourth in the final standings. Managed by Bob Gilks, the Crabs finished 14.5 games behind the first place Mobile Sea Gulls in the final standings, as the league again held no playoffs. Pitcher Jack Ryan of Gulfport led the Cotton States League with 220 strikeouts. Ryan would later manage the team.

The 1908 Gulfport team was known as the Gulfport-Biloxi Sand Crabs, playing in partnership with nearby Biloxi, Mississippi. The Gulfport-Biloxi Sand Crabs placed third in the Cotton States League final standings. Gulfport-Biloxi had a final regular season record of 63–52 and finished 7.5 games behind the first place Jackson Senators in the six–team league. Following the 1908 season, the Cotton States League did not play in 1909 and returned to play in 1910 without a Gulfport franchise.

=== 1926 to 1928: Cotton States League ===
after a twenty-season hiatus, minor league baseball returned to Gulfport in 1926. The new Gulfport franchise resumed play when a group of local businessmen bought the Cotton States League's Brookhaven Truckers franchise and moved that franchise to Gulfport, Mississippi.

Gulfport hosted an exhibition game against the Boston Red Sox in 1926 and defeated the Red Sox in the contest.

On May 2, 1926, Gulfport defeated Laurel by the score of 8-5. After the game, Laurel player/manager Sammy Vick protested the result on the grounds that Gulfport had too many "class" men.

The 1926 Gulfport "Tarpons" resumed play in the Cotton States League after the Brookhaven franchise was moved Gulfport. The Gulfport Tarpons became members of the eight–team Class D level league. The Alexandria Reds, Hattiesburg Pinetoppers, Jackson Red Sox, Laurel Lumberjacks, Meridian Mets, Monroe Drillers and Vicksburg Hill Billies teams joined with Gulfport in Cotton States League play.

Gulfport ended the 1926 season with a record of 57–66 to place sixth in the league standings, playing under managers Cotton Knaupp and Jack Ryan, a former player for the franchise. The Tarpons finished 16.5 games behind the first place Hattiesburg Pinetoppers in the final Cotton States League final standings. Pitcher Lester Rouprich, who played for both Gulfport and Jackson during the season, led the Cotton States League with 146 strikeouts.

With a record of 57–64, the 1927 Gulfport Tarpons placed fifth in the Cotton States League standings. Playing the season under manager Joe Evans, the Tarpons finished 29.0 games behind the first place Jackson Red Sox in the final standings and did not qualify for the playoffs.

In their final season of play, The Gulfport Tarpons continued play in the 1928 Cotton States League and ended the season in last place in the final standings of the six-team league. Gulfport finished their final regular season with a 50–65 overall record to place sixth in the league, which had two halves. Managed by the returning Cotton Knaupp, Gulfport finished 33.0 games behind the first place Jackson Red Sox in the final overall standings. Mike Powers, who played for both Gulfport and Jackson during the season, won the Cotton States League batting title, hitting .383. Powers also led the league with 174 total hits.

The Gulfport Tarpons did not return to play in the 2929 Cotton States League, replaced in the eight-team by the El Dorado Lions franchise. Gulfport, Mississippi has not hosted another minor league team.

== The ballparks ==
The Gulfport Tarpons hosted minor league home games at the Gulfport Fair Grounds from 1926 to 1928. The ballpark location was referenced to have been within the Gulfport Fairgrounds. Today, the Harrison County Fairgrounds are still in use, located at 15321 County Farm Road, Gulfport, Mississippi.

The 1908 Gulfport-Biloxi Sand Crabs played some home games in Biloxi, Mississippi.

From 1913 to 1915, the Detroit Tigers hosted their spring training at a location in Gulfport, Mississippi.

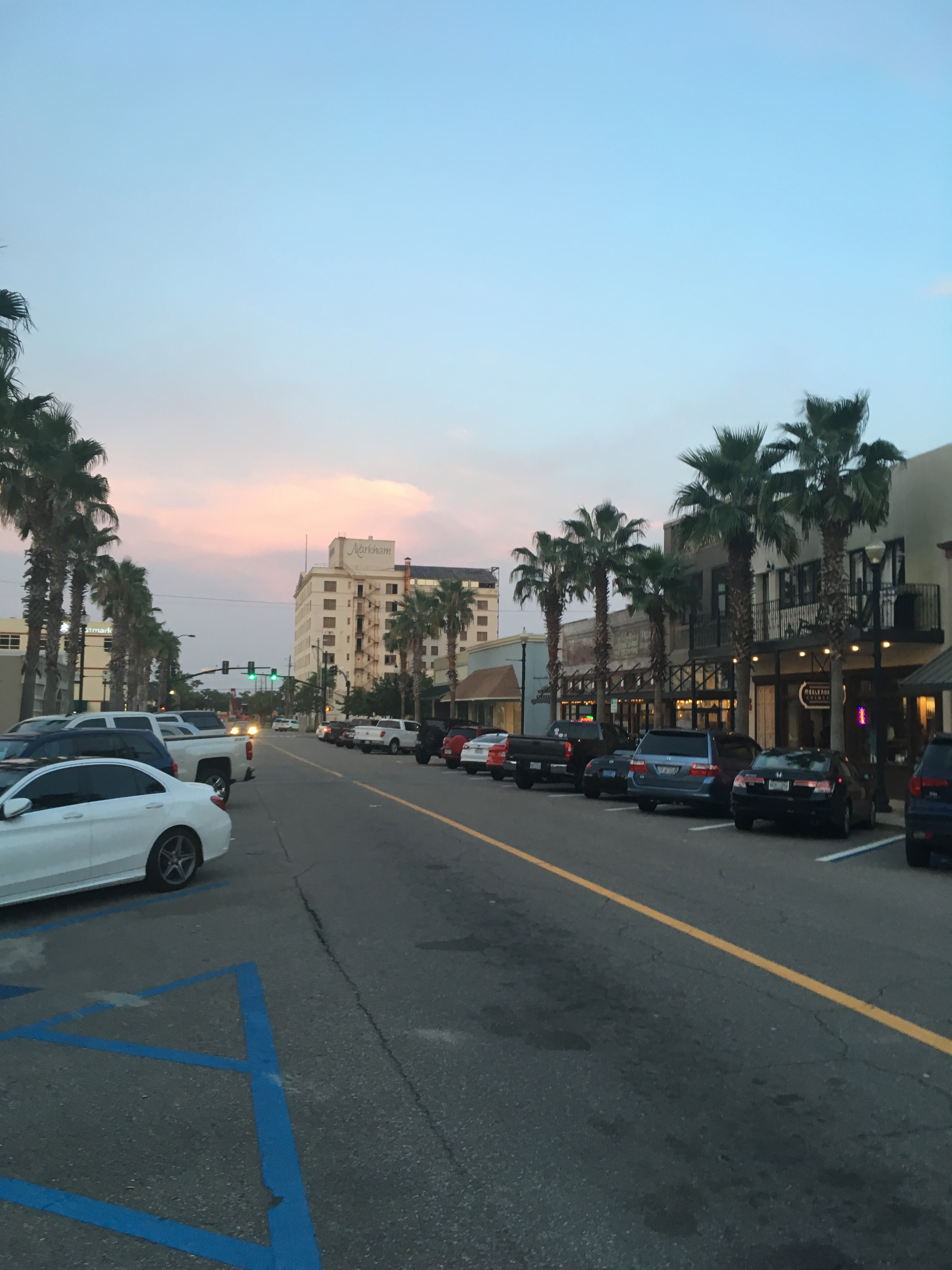
(2018) Downtown. Gulfport, Mississippi.

== Timeline ==
Year(s)	# Yrs.	Team	Level	League
1906–1907	2	Gulfport Crabs	Class D	Cotton States League
1908	1	Gulfport-Biloxi Sand Crabs	Class D	Cotton States League
1926–1928	3	Gulfport Tarpons	Class D	Cotton States League

== Year–by–year records ==
Year	Record	Finish	Manager	Playoffs
1906	58–61	4th	Eric Miller / John Bolin / Link Stickney	No playoffs held
1907	68–67	4th	Bob Gilks	No playoffs held
1908	63–52	3rd	Bob Gilks	No playoffs held
1926	57–66	6th	Cotton Knaupp / Jack Ryan	No playoffs held
1927	57–64	5th	Joe Evans	Did not qualify
1928	50–65	6th	Cotton Knaupp	Did not qualify

== Notable alumni ==
- Joe Berry (1927–1928)
- Jumbo Brown (1927)
- Orth Collins (1906)
- Spud Davis (1926)
- Joe Evans (1927, MGR)
- Don Flinn (1926)
- Tom Gettinger (1908)
- Bob Gilks (1907–1908, MGR)
- Art Goodwin (1907)
- Cotton Knaupp (1926, 1928, MGR)
- Jack Lively (1906–1908)
- Joe Price (1926–1927)
- Tom Reilly (1907–1908)
- Jack Ryan (1906–1907), (1926, MGR)
- Pete Susko (1926)
- Dixie Walker (1928) 5x MLB All–Star

== See also ==
- Gulfport Crabs players
- Gulfport Tarpons players
- Gulfport-Biloxi Sand Crabs players
