= Greenville Cotton Pickers =

- 1902–1905; Greenville, Mississippi

Minor league affiliations
- Class: Class D (1902–1905)
- League: Cotton States League (1902–1905)

Major league affiliations
- Team: None

Minor league titles
- League titles (1): 1905

Team data
- Name: Greenville Cotton Pickers (1902, 1904–1905); Greenville Grays (1903)
- Ballpark: Athletic Park (1902–1905)

The Greenville Cotton Pickers were a minor league baseball team based in Greenville, Mississippi. From 1902 to 1905, the "Cotton Pickers" played as a member of the Class D level Cotton States League, winning the 1905 league championship.

The Greenville Cotton Pickers and Greenville Grays teams hosted home minor league games at Athletic Park.

== History ==
=== Baseball beginnings ===
Prior to hosting minor league baseball, Greenville hosted numerous independent teams in the city.

=== 1902: Cotton States League charter members ===
Greenville, Mississippi first hosted minor league baseball in 1902, when the Greenville "Cotton Pickers" became charter members of the four–team Class D level Cotton States League. The "Greenville Baseball Association" was formed in 1902, corresponding with the team. George Wheatley was listed as the agent. The Greenville franchise joined the Baton Rouge Cajuns, Natchez Indians and Vicksburg Hill Climbers teams as charter members in the newly formed league. The league schedule began on May 8, 1902, and Greenville opened at home on that date against Baton Rouge. The Greenville home ballpark was Athletic Park and Greenville would host games at the ballpark through 1905.

The Greenville "Cotton Pickers" nickname corresponds with local agriculture and industry. The soil in the region led to the founding of the city by cotton pickers and a cotton exchange was set up in the city in 1877. Today, the Greenville cotton agriculture industry is vibrant and cotton remains the primary crop in the region, while the city hosts the state's largest port on the Mississippi River.

In their first season of play the 1902 Greenville Cotton Pickers finished last in the four-team league in a close race between the four teams. The Cotton Pickers finished with a record of 53–55, placing fourth in the Cotton States League. The manager was Bell Hebron as Greenville finished 3.0 games behind the first place Natchez Indians in the final standings. No league playoffs were held.

The 1902 season was the only minor league season for Greenville manager Bell Hebron. John Lawrence Hebron Jr., nicknamed "Bell" was a Greenville native who was a local attorney. On November 3, 1903, Hebron Jr. was elected as a Democrat to serve in the Mississippi State Senate. Hebron served in the Mississippi State Senate in numerous terms through 1936. Hebron and his family were prominent in cotton farming and cultivating in the era.

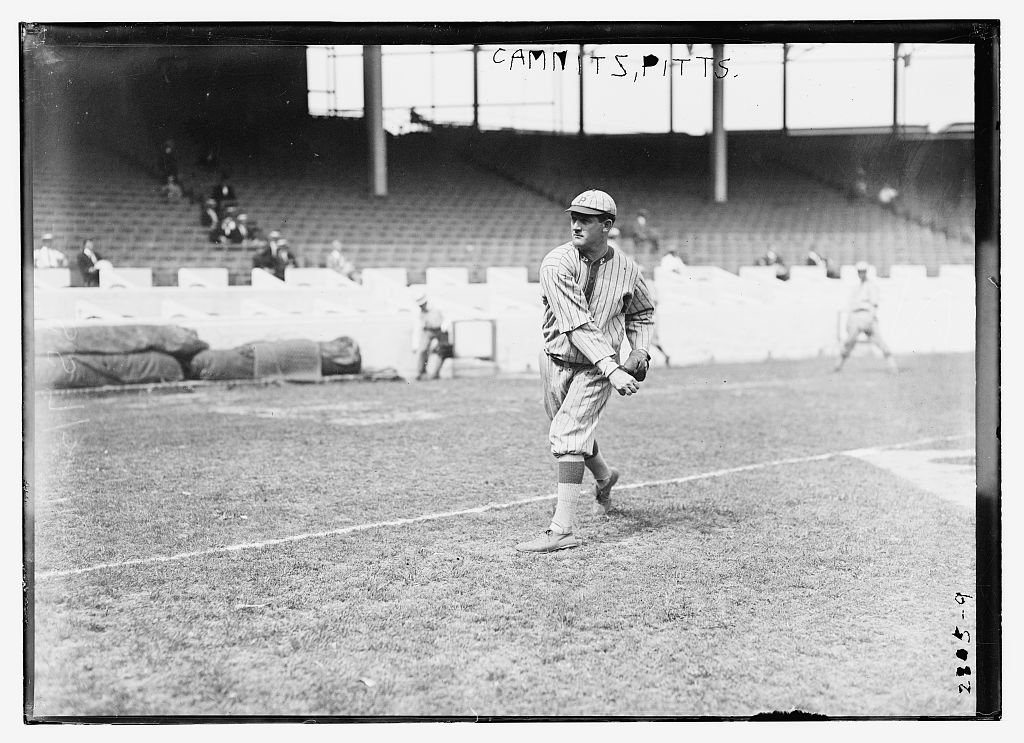
(1911) Howie Camnitz, Pittsburgh Pirates.Camnitz pitched for Greenville in 1902, In 1909 he won 25 games as the Pirates won the 1909 World Series.

At age 20, in his first professional season, Howie Camnitz pitched for Greenville in 1902. After making his major league debut with the Pittsburgh Pirates in 1904, Camnitz had three 20-win seasons for the Pittsburgh Pirates from 1909 to 1912. He won 25 games in 1909, helping the Pirates win 110 games en route to winning the 1909 World Series. in his major league career, Camnitz had a 133–106 record with 915 strikeouts and a 2.75 ERA in 2085 1/3 innings pitched. Following his 10–2 season with Greenville, Camnitz pitched for the Vicksburg Hill Billies in 1903 with a 26–7 record and a Cotton States League leading 294 strikeouts before making his major league debut in 1904.

Admiral Schlei played for Greenville in 1902. A catcher, Schlei advanced to play in the major leagues after playing the 1903 season with the Denver Grizzlies. Between 1904 and 1911, Schlei played for the Cincinnati Reds and New York Giants. With a .237 lifetime batting average, he was a primary catcher from the 1904 to the 1909. Schlei was the first Cincinnati Reds catcher to wear shin guards.

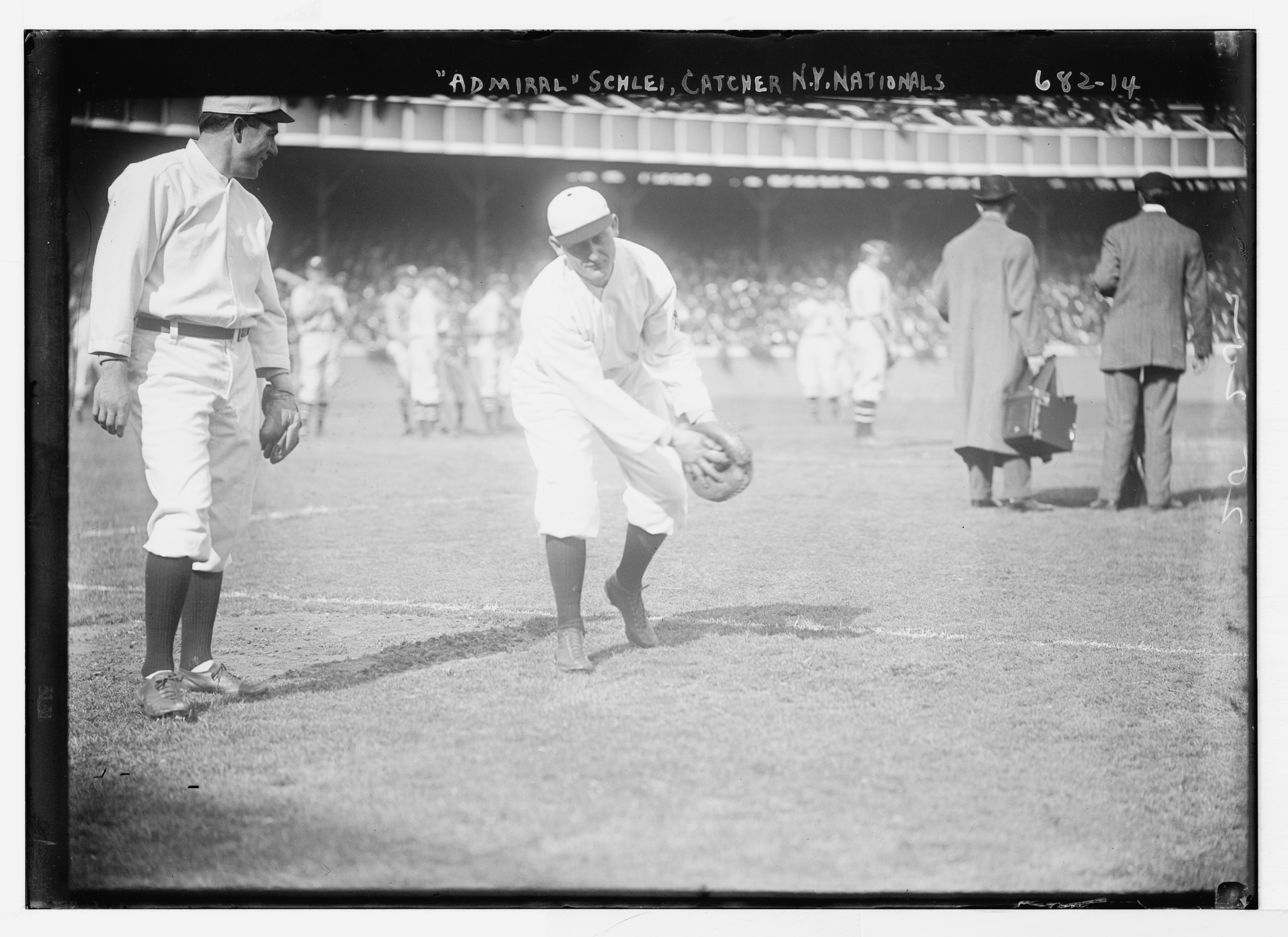
George H. "Admiral" Schlei, New York Giants. Schlei played for Greenville in 1902 before advancing to the major leagues.

=== 1903: Greenville Grays ===
The Cotton States League expanded in 1903, becoming a six team Class D level league with the addition of the Pine Bluff Lumbermen and Monroe Hill Citys franchises as expansion teams. Continuing play in the Cotton States League, the 1903 Greenville team was known' as the "Grays." Greenville and ended the season in fifth place. The Grays had a 53–64 record under manager Billy Smith and finished 21.5 games behind the first place Baton Rouge Red Sticks in the final standings. No playoffs were held. Greenville player/manager Billy Smith won the Cotton States League batting title, hitting .308.

=== 1904 & 1905: Cotton States League championship ===
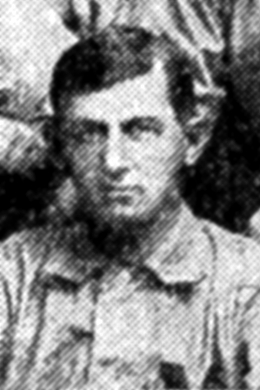
(1906) Bobby Rothermel. Rothermel was the player/manager of the 1904 Greenville Cotton Pickers.

At age 33, Bobby Rothermel became the player/manager for Greenville in 1904. Rothermel had played in major league baseball before the turn of the century with the Baltimore Orioles. In 1903, Rothermel had played in the league Cotton States for the Baton Rouge Red Sticks.

The 1904 Greenville Cotton Pickers placed fourth in the six-team Cotton States League final standings. The team had a record of 51–61, playing the season under manager Bobby Rothermel. The Cotton Pickers ended the season 20.0 games behind the first place Pine Bluff Lumbermen. Player/manager Bobby Rothermel batted .177 in 311 at bats for Greenville in his only season as a manager.

George Blackburn was a pitcher for Greenville in 1904. In his major league career, Blackburn had been a part of history. On July 16, 1897, Blackburn was pitching for the Baltimore Orioles against the Chicago Colts, today's Chicago Cubs. During the game, Chicago's Cap Anson became the first player in major league history to record 3,000 total hits when he hit a single off of Blackburn. Blackwell pitched for the Cotton Pickers in 1904 at age 34 and compiled an 18–12 record in 30 games for Greenville. Blackburn ended his 15-season professional career in the Cotton States League 1908 with the Vicksburg Hill Climbers. He had been a player-manager for numerous teams in the minor leagues and in 1907 he had a perfect 19–0 record while pitching for Vicksburg.

The 1905 Cotton States League season was interrupted by an epidemic and the Greenville Cotton Pickers were in first place when the league stopped play during the season. On July 31, 1905, the eight–team Cotton States League stopped play with the approval of the National Association, which governed minor league teams and leagues in the era. Greenville was led by manager George Reed and placed first in league standings in the shortened season. The Cotton Pickers had a record of 50–25 as Greenville finished 5.5 games ahead of the second place Meridian White Ribbons in the standings. Greenville player Mike Welday won the Cotton States League batting title, hitting .349 in the shortened season. Welday also led the league with both 62 runs scored and 99 total hits.

Following his strong 1905 season with Greenville, Mike Welday spent the 1906 season with the Class A level Des Moines Champs who won the Western League championship. With Des Moines, Welday batted .359, collecting 197 hits and playing in 120 games. Welday made his major league debut on April 21, 1907. He batted .202 in 53 major league games. After beginning his professional career in 1901, Welday continued play in the minor leagues through 1915.

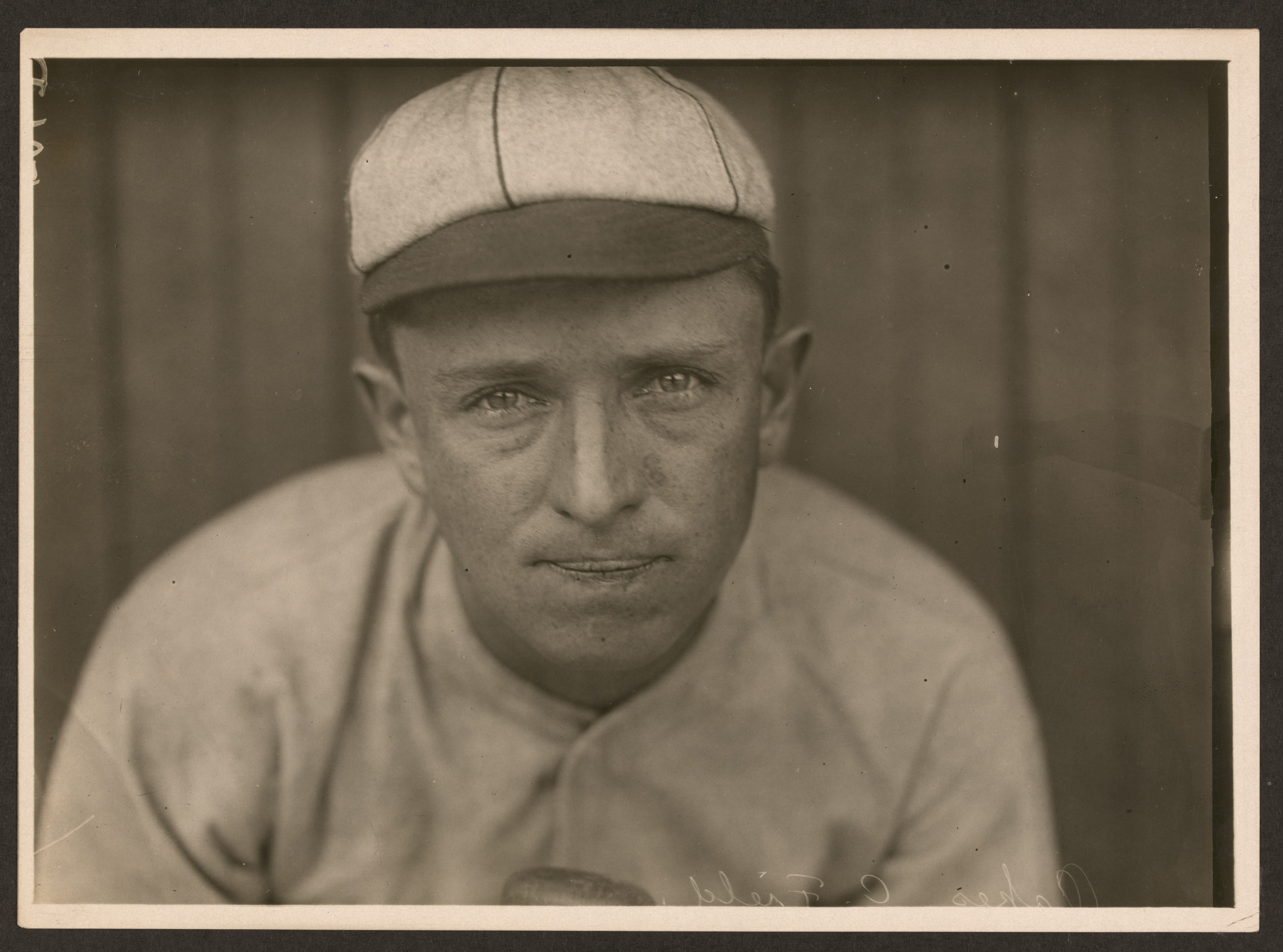
(1910) Rebel Oakes, St. Louis Cardinals. Oakes played for Greenville in 1905, He later became the namesake player-manager for the Pittsburgh Rebels franchise of the shirt-lived Federal League.

Rebel Oakes played for Greenville in 1905. Oakes was beginning his professional career in the Cotton States League after attending the Louisiana Industrial Institute, today's Louisiana Tech University. After his season with Greenville, Oakes continued play in the minor leagues playing in 1906 and 1907 with the Cedar Rapids Rabbits and 1908 with the Los Angeles Angels before making his major league debut in 1909 with Cincinnati Reds. In 1910, Oakes was traded by the Reds to the St. Louis Cardinals with Hall of Fame member manager Miller Huggins for Fred Beebe and became the Cardinals' starting center fielder. After playing four seasons with St. Louis, Oakes moved to the Federal League when the rival league was founded in 1914. Oakes became the player-manager for the Pittsburgh Rebels, who were Oakes' namesake. After the Federal League folded following the 1915 season, Oakes never returned to major league baseball, essentially blacklisted for his role in the Federal League. He served as the player-manager of the Denver Bears in 1916 and 1917 and later attempted to purchase the Pittsburgh Pirates, which proved unsuccessful. He also pursued purchasing the Boston Braves, Philadelphia Phillies and St. Louis Cardinals and was unsuccessful in each instance. In 1921, Oakes served as the player-manager of the Jackson Red Sox of the Mississippi State League in his final minor league season. Oakes continued a volatile career in the oil industry following his baseball career leaving him "broke" at the time of his death at age 64 in 1948.

Greenville did not return to Cotton States League play in 1906. Despite folding in 1905, the Cotton States League returned to play in 1906 as a six-team league, dropping Greenville and the Hattiesburg Pinetoppers franchises from the Class D level league.

Greenville, Mississippi was without minor league baseball for 17 seasons, until the 1922 Greenville Bucks resumed play when the Cotton States League reformed after folding following the 1913 season. The "Bucks" started another tenure of Greenville teams in the Cotton States League.

== The ballparks ==
Greenville teams hosted home Cotton States League minor league games at Athletic Park.

== Timeline ==
Year(s)	# Yrs.	Team	Level	League	Ballpark
1902	1	Greenville Cotton Pickers	Class D	Cotton States League	Athletic Park
1903	1	Greenville Grays	Class D	Cotton States League	Athletic Park
1903–1905	2	Greenville Cotton Pickers	Class D	Cotton States League	Athletic Park

== Year-by-year records ==
Year	Record	Finish	Manager	Playoffs/Notes
1902	53–55	4th	Bell Hebron	No playoffs held
1903	53–64	5th	Billy Smith	No playoffs held
1904	51–61	4th	Bobby Rothermel	No playoffs held
1905	50–25	1st	George Reed	League champions League stopped play July 31

== Notable alumni ==
- George Blackburn (1904)
- Howie Camnitz (1902)
- John Eubank (1903)
- Charlie Fritz (1903)
- Charlie Hamburg (1903)
- Sam LaRocque (1905)
- Bert Maxwell (1905)
- Rebel Oakes (1905)
- Tom Parrott (1905)
- Bobby Rothermel (1904, MGR)
- Admiral Schlei (1902)
- Mike Welday (1905)

== See also ==
- Greenville Cotton Pickers players
- Greenville Grays players
