= Laurel Cardinals =

- 1923–1929; Laurel, Mississippi

Minor league affiliations
- Class: Class D (1923–1929)
- League: Cotton States League (1923–1929)

Major league affiliations
- Team: St. Louis Cardinals (1928–1929)

Minor league titles
- League titles (0): None
- Conference titles (0): None

Team data
- Name: Laurel Lumberjacks (1923–1927); Laurel Cardinals (1928–1929)
- Ballpark: Kamper Park (1923–1929)

The Laurel Cardinals were a minor league baseball team based in Laurel, Mississippi. From 1923 to 1929, Laurel teams played exclusively as a member of the Cotton States League, hosting home games at Kamper Park. The Laurel Cardinals were minor league affiliates of the St. Louis Cardinals in 1928 and 1929, having first played as the Laurel "Lumberjacks."

== History ==
Laurel, Mississippi first hosted minor league baseball in 1923. The Laurel Lumberjacks became members of the eight–team Class D level Cotton States League. The Clarksdale Cubs, Greenville Swamp Angels, Greenwood Indians, Hattiesburg Hubmen, Jackson Red Sox, Meridian Mets and Vicksburg Hill Billies joined Laurel in league play.

On April 18, 1923, the Laurel Lumberjacks began league play in their first season of play. On July 24, 1923, the Cotton States League stopped play for the season. With a record of 43–35, Laurel finished in a second-place tie with the Greenwood Indians in the eight–team league. Laurel finished 1.5 games behind the first place Greenville Swamp Angels. They were managed by Charles Hodge and Bill Statham. Player/manager Bill Statham of Laurel led the Cotton States League with 17 wins.

The 1924 season saw the Cotton States League return to play as a six–team Class D level league. The Laurel Lumberjacks ended the 1924 Cotton States League season schedule with a record of 43–57, placing fifth in the final standings. Managed by Baxter Sparks, Pat Boyd and Ed McDonald, Laurel finished 22.5 games behind the first place Hattiesburg Hubmen.

Led by managers Jake Propst, Jim Moore, Pat Devereaux and Sammy Vick, the 1925 Laurel Lumberjacks placed fifth in the Cotton States League final standings. Laurel had a regular season record of 58–64 and finished 12.0 games behind the first place Meridian Mets in the eight–team league.

The 1926 Laurel Lumberjacks continued play in the Cotton States League. Laurel ended the season with a record of 59–61 to place fifth in the league standings, playing under managers Sammy Vick and Bill Statham. The Lumberjacks finished 16.5 games behind the first place Hattiesburg Pinetoppers in the final Cotton States League final standings. On May 2, 1926, the Gulfport Tarpons defeated Laurel by the score of 8-5. After the game, Laurel player/manager Sammy Vick protested the result on the grounds that Gulfport had too many "class" men. On August 16, 1926 Vick was sold to the New Orleans Pelicans while leading the Cotton States League with a .391 batting average.

With a record of 41–70, the 1927 Laurel Lumberjacks ended the season in last place in the Cotton States League final standings. Playing under managers Frank Matthews and Buck Stapleton, the Laurel Lumberjacks placed eighth in the eight–team league, finishing 29.0 games behind the first place Jackson Red Sox.

The Laurel "Cardinals" continued play in the 1928 Cotton States League, as the franchise became an affiliate of the St. Louis Cardinals. Laurel finished the regular season with a 44–78 overall record to place seventh in the league, which had two halves. Managed by John Ganzel and Bobby Schang, Laurel finished 33.0 games behind the first place Jackson Red Sox in the final overall standings.

In their final season of play, continuing Cotton States League membership, the 1929 Laurel Cardinals placed fourth in the eight–team league. Playing under manager Clay Hopper, the Cardinals finished with a 59–63 regular season record. Laurel finished 14.0 games behind the first place Alexandria Reds. The Laurel franchise permanently folded following the 1929 season.

Laurel, Mississippi has not hosted another minor league team.

== The ballparks ==
Laurel minor league teams played home games at Kamper Park. Today, Kamper Park is still in use as a public park with baseball fields and a zoo. Kamper Park is located at 107 South 17th Avenue in Hattiesburg, Mississippi.

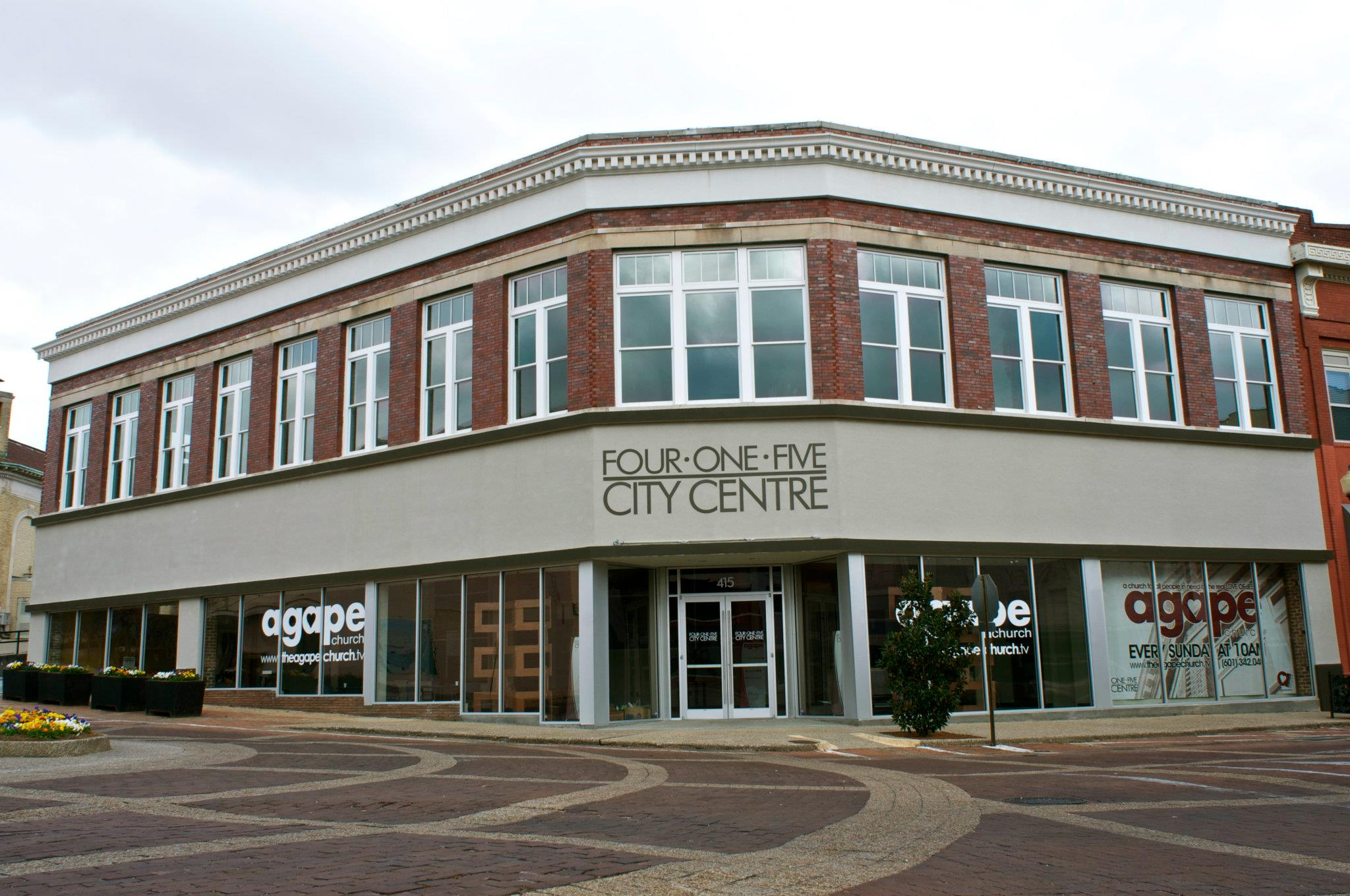
(2012) Historic Woolworth Building. National Register of Historic Places. Laurel, Mississippi.

== Timeline ==
| Year(s) | # Yrs. | Team | Level | League | Affiiate | Ballpark |
|---|---|---|---|---|---|---|
| 1923–1927 | 5 | Laurel Lumberjacks | Class D | Cotton States League | None | Kamper Park |
| 1928–1929 | 2 | Laurel Cardinals | Class D | Cotton States League | St. Louis Cardinals | Kamper Park |

== Year–by–year records ==
| Year | Record | Finish | Manager | Playoffs |
|---|---|---|---|---|
| 1923 | 43–35 | 2nd (t) | Charles Hodge / Bill Statham | League disbanded July 24 |
| 1924 | 43–57 | 5th | Baxter Sparks / Pat Boyd / Ed McDonald | Did not qualify |
| 1925 | 58–64 | 5th | Jake Propst / Jim Moore / Pat Devereaux / Sammy Vick | Did not qualify |
| 1926 | 59–61 | 5th | Sammy Vick / Bill Statham | No playoffs held |
| 1927 | 41–70 | 8th | Frank Matthews / Buck Stapleton | Did not qualify |
| 1928 | 44–78 | 7th | John Ganzel / Bobby Schang | Did not qualify |
| 1929 | 59–63 | 4th | Clay Hopper | Did not qualify |

== Notable alumni ==
- Joe Berry (1927)
- Ed Chapman (1928)
- Como Cotelle (1929)
- Clarence Heise (1928)
- Clay Hopper (1929, MGR)
- Joel Hunt (1928)
- George Jackson (1929)
- Ray Moss (1924)
- Tim Murchison (1927)
- Bill Norman (1929)
- Tom Oliver (1923)
- Ray Pepper (1928)
- Red Rollings (1924–1925)
- Bobby Schang (1928, MGR)
- Merle Settlemire (1925)
- Elmer Tutwiler (1925–1926)
- Sammy Vick (1925-1926, MGR)
- Lon Warneke (1928) 5x MLB All–Star
- Al Williamson (1925)

== See also ==
- Laurel Lumberjacks players
- Laurel Cardinals players
