= Cotton Klindworth =

American baseball player and football coach (1900–1978)

- Catcher
- Born: September 28, 1900; Kansas City, Kansas, US
- Died: September 1978 (aged 77–78); West Memphis, Arkansas, US
- Batted: Right Threw: Right

Martin Ethbert "Cotton" Klindworth (September 28, 1900 – September 1978) was an American professional baseball player and freshman football coach. He attended Mississippi A&M and played in the Cotton States League. He played two years for the Meridian Mets.
