= Rullo =

Rullo is an Italian surname. Notable people with the surname include:

- Erminio Rullo (born 1984), Italian footballer
- Jason Rullo (born 1972), American drummer
- Jerry Rullo (1923–2016), American basketball player
- Joe Rullo (1916–1969), American baseball player
