= Spoke Emery =

American baseball player

- Outfielder
- Born: December 10, 1896; Bay City, Michigan, U.S.
- Died: June 2, 1975 (aged 78); Cape Canaveral, Florida, U.S.
- Batted: Right Threw: Right

MLB debut
- July 18, 1924, for the Philadelphia Phillies

Last MLB appearance
- July 26, 1924, for the Philadelphia Phillies

MLB statistics
- Batting average: .667
- Home runs: 0
- Runs batted in: 0
- Stats at Baseball Reference

Teams
- Philadelphia Phillies (1924)

Herrick Smith "Spoke" Emery (December 10, 1898 – June 2, 1975) was an American Major League Baseball outfielder.

Born in Bay City, Michigan, Spoke played one season in Major League Baseball, in 1924 with the Philadelphia Phillies. He played five games in the major leagues, with two career hits in three at-bats. After the end of his brief career in the majors, he remained active in the minor leagues, as a player-manager. Emery played for and managed the Class D Cotton States League's Meridian Mets from 1926 until the middle of 1927. He also played and managed for the Class D Mississippi Valley League's Cedar Rapids Bunnies in 1927 and 1928, then moved on to the Class D Eastern Carolina League's Goldsboro Goldbugs in 1929, playing and managing there as well. This marked the end of Emery's playing career, but he remained active as a manager for one more season, spending 1930 as the skipper of the Class C Ontario League's Brantford Red Sox.

Emery died on June 2, 1975, in Cape Canaveral, Florida.
