= Natchez, Mississippi minor league baseball history =

Natchez, Mississippi minor league baseball teams
- 1893–1953; (1893–1894, 1902–1905, 1940–1942, 1946–1953); Natchez, Mississippi

Minor league affiliations
- Class: Independent (1893–1894); Class D (1902–1905, 1941–1942, 1946–1947); Class C (1948–1953)
- League: Mississippi State League (1893–1894); Cotton States League (1902–1905); Evangeline League (1940–1942, 1946–1947); Cotton States League (1948–1953)

Major league affiliations
- Team: New York Giants (1942)

Minor league titles
- League titles (4): 1902; 1942; 1949; 1951
- Wild card berths (3): 1946; 1950; 1952

Team data
- Name: Natchez (1893–1894); Natchez Indians (1902–1905); Natchez Pilgrims (1940–1941); Natchez Giants (1942, 1946–1947); Natchez Indians (1948–1953)
- Ballpark: Athletic Park (1893–1894, 1902–1905); Liberty Park (1940–1942, 1946–1953)

Minor league baseball teams were based in Natchez, Mississippi in various seasons between 1893 and 1953. The Natchez teams played as members of the Mississippi State League (1893–1894), Cotton States League (1902–1905), Evangeline League (1940–1942, 1946–1947) and Cotton States League (1948–1953), winning four league championships.

Natchez was a minor league affiliate of the New York Giants in 1942.

== History ==
Minor league baseball began play in Natchez in 1893. The Natchez team played as a member of the Mississippi State League in 1893 and 1894.

The Natchez Indians played as members of the Class D level Cotton States League from 1902 to 1905. The Indians were founding members of the Cotton States League in 1902, along with the Baton Rouge Cajuns, Greenville Cotton Pickers and Vicksburg Hill Climbers. The Natchez Indians were Cotton States League Champions in 1902. Natchez placed third in 1903 with a 59–59 record and placed sixth in 1904, finishing with a 42–74 record. The Indians had a record of 18–27 on June 26, 1905, when the franchise moved to Mobile, Alabama and became the Mobile Sea Gulls.

After a 25–year span between teams, the Natchez Pilgrims began play in the 1940 Class D level Evangeline League when the Houma Buccaneers moved to Natchez on June 27, 1940. The Pilgrims finished in seventh place in both 1940 and 1941.

In 1942, Natchez became an affiliate of the New York Giants and became the Natchez Giants. The Evangeline League suspended play on May 30, 1942, with the Giants in 1st place with a 29–10 record. The League resumed in 1946, with the Natchez Giants placing second in 1946 and being eliminated in the playoffs. The Giants placed sixth in 1947.

In 1948, Natchez joined the Class C level Cotton States League, playing again as the Natchez Indians. The Indians played in the league from 1948 to 1953, capturing the 1949 and 1951 Cotton States League championships and losing in the league finals in 1950 and 1952. Natchez folded after a 50–75, seventh place finish in the 1953 season. Natchez has not hosted another minor league team.

== The ballparks ==
Early Natchez teams were noted to have played at Athletic Park in Natchez, Mississippi.

Beginning in 1940, Natchez minor league teams were referenced to have played at Liberty Park. The ballpark had a capacity 1,400 in 1941 and 2,700 in 1949. Still in use today as a public park, Liberty Park is located at 301 Liberty Road, Natchez, Mississippi.

== Notable alumni ==
- Billy Crowell (1893)
- Hersh Freeman (1948)
- Tom Gettinger (1902–1905)
- Jackie Hayes (1893)
- Ben Koehler (1904)
- Harry Perkowski (1942)
- Joe Rullo (1948–1949, MGR)

== See also ==
- Natchez Giants players
- Natchez Indians players
- Natchez Pilgrims players
