= Pensacola Snappers =

- 1913; Pensacola, Florida

Minor league affiliations
- Class: Class D (1913)
- League: Cotton States League (1913)

Minor league titles
- League titles (0): None

Team data
- Name: Pensacola Snappers (1913)
- Ballpark: Maxent Park (1913)

The Pensacola Snappers were a minor league baseball team based in Pensacola, Florida. In 1913, the Snappers played as members of the Class D level Cotton States League, finishing second in the league standings before the league folded following the season. Pensacola played minor league home games at Maxent Park, which had hosted major league spring training in 1913.

== History ==
The "Snappers" were preceded in minor league play by the 1903 Pensacola team that played as members of the Interstate League.

In 1913, Pensacola resumed minor league play, as the Pensacola "Snappers" became members of the six-team, Class D level Cotton States League. The Clarksdale Swamp Angels, Columbus Joy Riders, Jackson Lawmakers, Meridian Metropolitans and Selma Centralites teams joined Pensacola in beginning league play on April 10, 1913.

The "Snappers" nickname corresponds to local fishing and harvesting. The region is known for red snapper fishing.

On April 27, 1913, the Snappers defeated Columbus 16–3, compiling 27 hits in the victory. After the win over Columbus, Pensacola had a record of 6–5 and were in third place behind first place Jackson, who had a 12–2 record.

In their only season of play, the 1913 Pensacola Snappers finished second in the league standings. Playing under manager Jimmy Hamilton, Pensacola ended the season with a record of 67–29 and finished 4.5 games behind the first place Jackson Lawmakers (71–24) in the final standings.

The Cotton States League folded following the completion of the 1913 season, with the onset of World War I. The league resumed play in 1922, without a Pensacola franchise.

Pensacola, Florida next hosted minor league baseball in 1927, when the Pensacola Pilots began play as members of Class B level Southeastern League.

== The ballpark ==
The Pensacola Snappers hosted 1913 minor league home games at Maxent Park. Built in 1911, the ballpark was later renamed to Legion Field in 1927. The ballpark was located at G Street & Gregory Street. The Snappers also were noted to have played some games at a ballpark near Star Lake in Pensacola.

The Cleveland Naps and Brooklyn Dodgers both held their 1913 spring training at Maxent Park. The ballpark was segregated in the era, with 3,500 white spectators allowed in the grandstands, the seating for 500 black spectators required patrons to sit in the left field line bleachers. The Pensacola Pilots continued minor league play at the ballpark in 1927.

Today, Legion Field is still in use at the same site as a public park with a ballpark and other amenities. The location is 1301 West Gregory Street.

== Year–by–year record ==
Year	Record	Finish	Manager	Playoffs/Notes
1964	67–29	2nd	Jimmy Hamilton	No playoffs held

== Notable alumni ==
- LaRue Kirby (1913)
- Leo Townsend (1913)
- Pensacola Snappers players
