= William Herschel Bobo =

American baseball player and sports coach (1896–1975)

Biographical details
- Born: January 16, 1896; Austin, Mississippi, U.S.
- Died: February 18, 1975 (aged 79); Jackson, Mississippi, U.S.

Playing career

Football
- 1917: Mississippi State

Baseball
- 1921: Clarksdale Cubs
- 1922–1923: Greenswood Indians
- 1923: Paducah Indians
- 1924–1928: Hattiesburg Hubbers/Pinetoppers
- 1929–1931: Jackson Senators
- 1932: Memphis Chickasaws
- 1933: Jackson Senators
- 1934: El Dorado Lions
- 1934–1936: Jackson Senators
- 1937–1938: Blytheville Giants
- 1939–1940: Fort Smith Giants
- Positions: Quarterback (football); Third baseman (baseball)

Coaching career (HC unless noted)

Football
- 1924–1927: Mississippi State Teachers

Basketball
- 1924–1928: Mississippi State Teachers

Baseball
- 1924–1928: Hattiesburg Hubbers/Pinetoppers
- 1925–1928: Mississippi State Teachers
- 1929–1931: Jackson Senators
- 1933: Jackson Senators
- 1934: Auburn
- 1935: Jackson Senators
- 1937–1938: Blytheville Giants
- 1939–1941: Fort Smith Giants
- 1942: Natchez Giants
- 1945: Hickory Rebels
- 1947: Helena Seaporters
- 1951: Clarksdale Planters

Administrative career (AD unless noted)
- 1924–1928: Mississippi State Teachers

Head coaching record
- Overall: 9–17–4 (college football); 31–17–1 (college basketball); 24–14–1 (collegebaseball)

Accomplishments and honors

Awards
- All-Southern (1917)

William Herschel Bobo (January 16, 1896 – February 18, 1975) was an American minor league baseball player and manager, college football, college basketball, and college baseball coach, and athletics administrator. He served as the head football coach at Mississippi State Teachers College—now known as the University of Southern Mississippi—from 1924 to 1927, compiling a record of 9–17–4. Bobo was also the head basketball coach at Mississippi State Teachers from 1924 to 1928, tallying a mark of 31–17–1, and the school's head baseball from 1925 to 1928, amassing a record of 19–10–1.

On March 4, 1934, Bobo was hired as the head baseball coach at Auburn University, succeeding Sam J. McAllister. He resigned several weeks later, on April 14, to work for a wholesale grocery firm in Jackson, Mississippi. He was replaced by Dell Morgan as Auburn's coach.

Bobo was a native of Clarksdale, Mississippi. He died on February 18, 1975, at St. Dominic Hospital in Jackson, Mississippi.

== Head coaching record ==
=== College football ===
Year	Team	Overall	Conference	Standing	Bowl/playoffs
Mississippi State Teachers Yellow Jackets (Independent) (1924–1927)
1924	Mississippi State Teachers	3–3–2			
1925	Mississippi State Teachers	0–6			
1926	Mississippi State Teachers	3–4–1			
1927	Mississippi State Teachers	3–4–1			
Mississippi State Teachers:		9–17–4			
Total:		9–17–4			
