= Lindsay Deal =

American baseball player (1911-1979)

- Outfielder
- Born: September 3, 1911; Lenoir, North Carolina, U.S.
- Died: April 18, 1979 (aged 67); Little Rock, Arkansas, U.S.
- Batted: Left Threw: Right

MLB debut
- September 13, 1939, for the Brooklyn Dodgers

Last MLB appearance
- October 1, 1939, for the Brooklyn Dodgers

MLB statistics
- Batting average: .000
- Home runs: 0
- Runs batted in: 0
- Stats at Baseball Reference

Teams
- Brooklyn Dodgers (1939)

Fred Lindsay Deal (September 3, 1911 – April 18, 1979) was an American professional baseball player who played outfield for the 1939 Brooklyn Dodgers.

He was player/manager of the Greenville Bucks of the Cotton States League in 1948.
