= Alexandria Reds =

Alexandria Reds may refer to:

- Alexandria Reds (Cotton States League), an American minor-league baseball team 1925–1930
- Alexandria Reds (NPSL), an American soccer team in the National Premier Soccer League
