= Whitey Moore =

American baseball player (1912–1987)

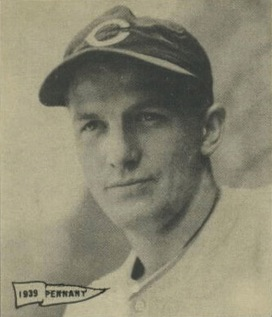
- Pitcher
- Born: June 10, 1912; Tuscarawas, Ohio, U.S.
- Died: December 10, 1987 (aged 75); Uhrichsville, Ohio, U.S.
- Batted: Right Threw: Right

MLB debut
- September 27, 1936, for the Cincinnati Reds

Last MLB appearance
- September 27, 1942, for the St. Louis Cardinals

MLB statistics
- Win–loss record: 30–29
- Earned run average: 3.75
- Strikeouts: 228
- Stats at Baseball Reference

Teams
- Cincinnati Reds (1936–1942); St. Louis Cardinals (1942)

Career highlights and awards
- World Series champion (1940)

Lloyd Albert Moore (June 10, 1912 – December 10, 1987) was an American Major League Baseball player who was a right-handed pitcher from 1936 to 1942. He played for the St. Louis Cardinals and Cincinnati Reds. He stood 6 feet 1 inch (1.85 m) tall and weighed 195 pounds (88 kg).

== Early life ==
Moore was born on June 10, 1912, in Uhrichsville, in Tuscarawas County in eastern Ohio, the second of three sons of Clara Aurelia Moery and Eugene Albert Moore. By the time he was a teenager, he was working in railroad construction along with playing with independent baseball in the area. His talents brought attention, subsequently signing with the Cincinnati Reds in 1934.

== Career ==
Moore began his career with the Jeannette Reds, a Class D team in the Pennsylvania State Association. He went 12–6 with the team before moving up to the Beckley Black Knights of the Middle Atlantic League. He went 1–4 to close out the year. He played with three teams in 1935, the Mount Airy Reds of the Bi-State League, the Wilmington Pirates of the Piedmont League, and the Toronto Maple Leafs of the International League, the highlight being a 10–6 record with Mount Airy. He started 1936 with the El Dorado Lions of the Cotton States League, going 20–5 with a 2.33 ERA. He then went to the Macon Peaches of the South Atlantic League, going 2–2 before being called up by the Reds in September. On September 27, Moore made his debut in the majors, playing against the Pittsburgh Pirates at Crosley Field. He entered in the third inning in relief of Dee Moore. In five innings of work, he allowed three runs on three hits while having four strikeouts and three walks, although the Reds won the game 6–5 to give him his first career win.

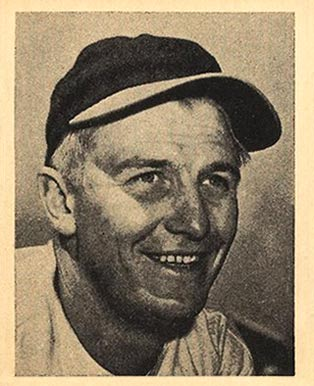
Moore in 1940

Moore contributed thirteen victories to the Cincinnati Reds' 1939 pennant, the most victories he recorded in a season. He had a reputation of having a good fastball. When Cincinnati went to the World Series against the Yankees he pitched three perfect innings in relief in Game 3. During his 7-year career he had an ERA of 3.75 with a record of 30 wins and 29 losses. He recorded 228 strikeouts and started 60 games.

Moore enlisted in the United States Army in Akron in 1943. He was inducted as a private, serving as a combat engineer until 1946.

Moore attempted a brief comeback with the farm team of the St. Louis Cardinals, the Rochester Red Wings. He went 2–7 before deciding to retire. He returned to Tuscarawas County to work as an assembler for Warner-Swasey Company, an industrial plant. He worked there until 1977. He died on December 10, 1987, at the Beacon Point Rest Home in Uhrichsville. He is buried with his wife Frances Jane McClelland at the Union Cemetery.
