= Ed Albrecht =

American baseball player (1929-1979)

- Pitcher
- Born: February 28, 1929; Affton, Missouri, U.S.
- Died: December 29, 1979 (aged 50); Cahokia, Illinois, U.S.
- Batted: Right Threw: Right

MLB debut
- October 2, 1949, for the St. Louis Browns

Last MLB appearance
- April 26, 1950, for the St. Louis Browns

MLB statistics
- Win–loss record: 1-1
- Earned run average: 5.40
- Strikeouts: 2
- Stats at Baseball Reference

Teams
- St. Louis Browns (1949–1950)

Edward Arthur Albrecht (February 28, 1929 – December 29, 1979) was an American professional baseball pitcher. He played parts of two seasons in Major League Baseball, 1949 and 1950, for the St. Louis Browns.

In 1949, at the age of 20, Albrecht earned his shot at the majors by having a record-breaking season in what was then the Class C Cotton States League. Pitching for the Pine Bluff Judges, Albrecht won 29 games and struck out 389 batters, both all-time records for the league. The Browns called him up to make a start for them on the last day of the season, in which he earned his one and only major league win. Albrecht pitched in two games for the Browns in 1950 before returning to the minors, retiring in 1953.

In an odd statistical coincidence, Albrecht's ERA in both of his major league seasons was exactly the same as his career ERA of 5.40.
