= Buckville Cemetery =

Historic cemetery in Arkansas, United States

- U.S. National Register of Historic Places
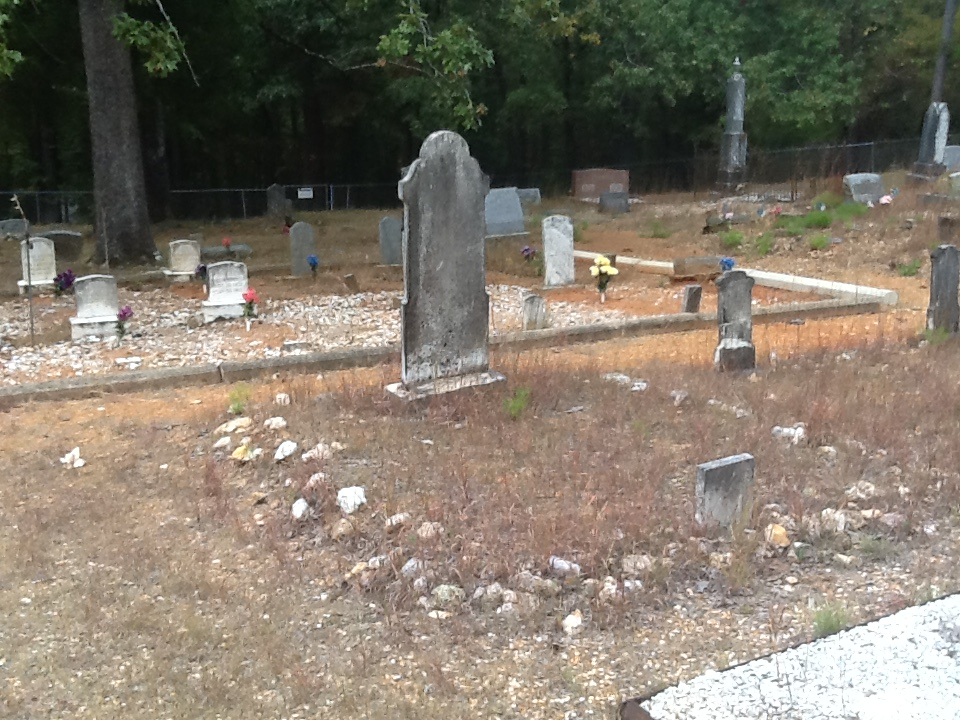

- Location within Arkansas Location within the United States
- Nearest city: Hot Springs, Arkansas
- Coordinates: 34°36′51″N 93°20′32″W
- Area: 2.1 acres (0.85 ha)
- Built: 1861
- NRHP reference No.: 07000994
- Added to NRHP: September 27, 2007

Buckville Cemetery is a historic cemetery in rural Garland County, Arkansas. It is one of the few surviving remnants of the town of Buckville, which was inundated by the creation of Lake Ouachita; the other is the nearby Buckville Baptist Church, which was moved to its present location above the lake's planned water level in 1951. The cemetery, located near the end of Buckville Road on the north side of the lake (accessible via Arkansas Highway 298), the cemetery has more than 300 burials, include graves of some of the area's earliest settlers. The oldest documented burial is dated 1861.

The cemetery was listed on the National Register of Historic Places in 2007.

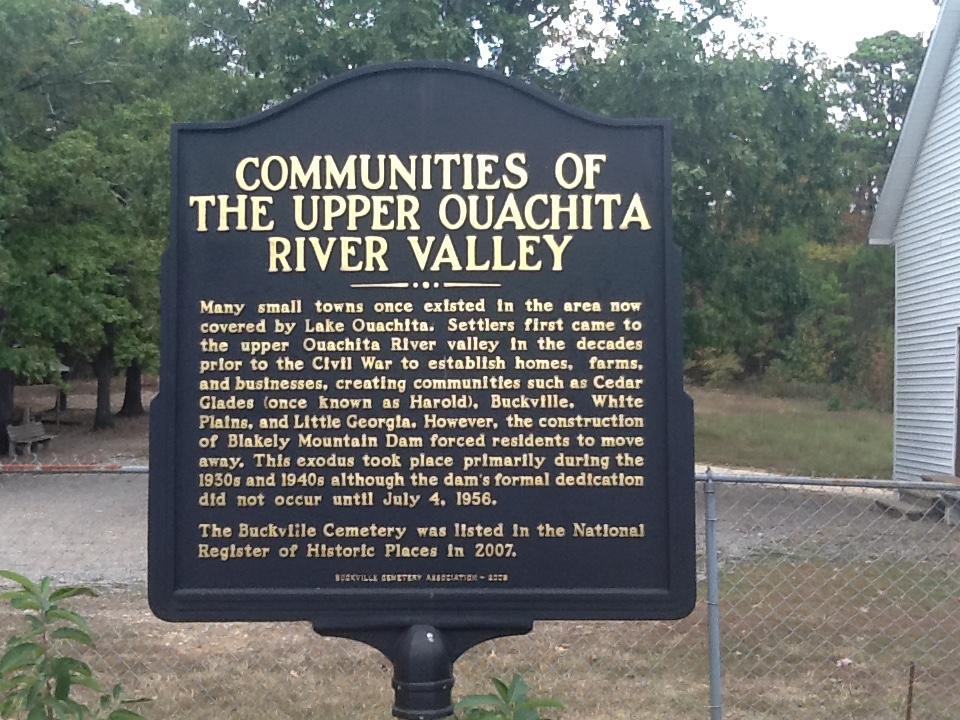
Historical Marker

== See also ==
- Buckville, Arkansas
- National Register of Historic Places listings in Garland County, Arkansas
