= Jackson Lawmakers =

Defunct American baseball club

The Jackson Lawmakers were a Cotton States League minor league baseball team based in Jackson, Mississippi that played during the 1913 season. Managed by Otto Mills, the team finished first in the league's standings. It featured players Rags Faircloth and Alex Malloy.
