= Cowboy Jones =

American baseball player (1874–1958)

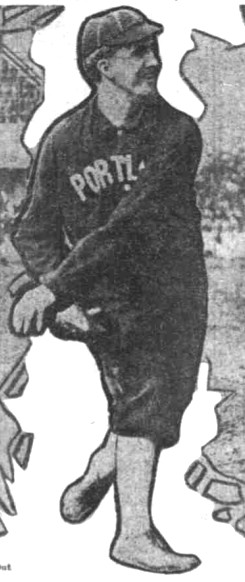
- Pitcher
- Born: August 23, 1874; Golden, Colorado, US
- Died: February 9, 1958 (aged 83); Inglewood, California, US
- Batted: Left Threw: Left

MLB debut
- June 24, 1898, for the Cleveland Spiders

Last MLB appearance
- June 21, 1901, for the St. Louis Cardinals

MLB statistics
- Win–loss record: 25–34
- Strikeouts: 147
- Earned run average: 3.63
- Stats at Baseball Reference

Teams
- Cleveland Spiders (1898); St. Louis Perfectos/Cardinals (1899–1901)

Albert Edward "Cowboy" "Bronco" Jones (August 23, 1874 – February 9, 1958) was an American professional baseball pitcher. He pitched one full season and parts of three others in Major League Baseball from 1898 until 1901 for the Cleveland Spiders and St. Louis Perfectos/Cardinals.

Born August 23, 1874, in Golden, Colorado Territory, Jones pitched collegiately for the Colorado School of Mines in 1894-1895. He has a known college record of 5-1 with 1 no decision, and 1 save if such a statistic had been kept, pitching 65 innings. This includes a 16-strikeout game against the University of Colorado at Golden on May 4, 1895 and an 11-strikeout performance against CU at Boulder on May 25, 1895.

Jones began his professional career in 1896 with the Pueblo Rovers of the Colorado State League and made his major league debut on June 24, 1898 with the Cleveland Spiders. Jones was the first player born in Colorado to play in the major leagues, and the only one who played in the 19th century. In 1899, the Spiders' owners transferred most of the Cleveland stars, including Jones, to the St. Louis Perfectos. Jones pitched three seasons for the Perfectos, who were renamed the Cardinals in 1899. Johnson played with the Cardinals through the 1901 season and continued to play minor league baseball until 1915, when he retired at age 41 and settled in the town of his birth, Golden, Colorado. He later served as Mayor of Golden.

Jones died in Inglewood, California on February 9, 1958.
