= Red Torkelson =

American baseball player (1894–1964)

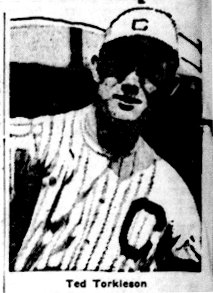
- Pitcher
- Born: March 19, 1894; Chicago, Illinois, U.S.
- Died: September 22, 1964 (aged 70); Chicago, Illinois, U.S.
- Batted: Right Threw: Right

MLB debut
- August 29, 1917, for the Cleveland Indians

Last MLB appearance
- September 29, 1917, for the Cleveland Indians

MLB statistics
- Win–loss record: 2–1
- Earned run average: 7.66
- Strikeouts: 10
- Stats at Baseball Reference

Teams
- Cleveland Indians (1917)

Chester Leroy "Red" Torkelson (March 19, 1894 – September 22, 1964) was an American Major League Baseball pitcher who played in 1917 with the Cleveland Indians. He batted and threw right-handed. Torkelson had a 2-1 record, with a 7.66 ERA, in four games, in his one-year career. He was born and died in Chicago, Illinois.
