= Al Williamson (baseball) =

American baseball player (1900–1978)

- Pitcher
- Born: February 20, 1900; Buckville, Arkansas, U.S.
- Died: November 29, 1978 (aged 78); Hot Springs, Arkansas, U.S.
- Batted: Right Threw: Right

MLB debut
- April 27, 1928, for the Chicago White Sox

Last MLB appearance
- April 27, 1928, for the Chicago White Sox

MLB statistics
- Earned run average: 0.00
- Innings pitched: 2.0
- Stats at Baseball Reference

Teams
- Chicago White Sox (1928)

Silas Albert Williamson (February 20, 1900 – November 29, 1978) was an American Major League Baseball pitcher who played for one season. He played minor league baseball in Arkansas from 1924. He pitched for the Chicago White Sox in one game, playing on April 27 during the 1928 Chicago White Sox season. He was released back to the minor leagues, to the Shreveport team in the Texas League, at the end of the 1928 season. He played in Bloomington, Indiana, in 1931, and in Minneapolis in 1932. In 1933 he was cut from the Minneapolis AA baseball team.

Williamson was born in Buckville, Arkansas. He married and had four children. He died in Hot Springs in 1978, at the age of 78.
