= Bob Harrison (baseball) =

American baseball player (1930–2023)

- Pitcher
- Born: September 22, 1930; St. Louis, Missouri
- Died: January 11, 2023 (aged 92); Fishers, Indiana
- Batted: Left Threw: Right

MLB debut
- September 23, 1955, for the Baltimore Orioles

Last MLB appearance
- September 25, 1956, for the Baltimore Orioles

MLB statistics
- Win–loss record: 0–0
- Earned run average: 12.27
- Innings: 3 2/3
- Stats at Baseball Reference

Teams
- Baltimore Orioles (1955–1956)

Robert Lee Harrison (September 22, 1930 – January 11, 2023) was an American professional baseball player, a right-handed pitcher who had two one-game end-of-season trials in Major League Baseball for the Baltimore Orioles in 1955 and 1956. He batted left-handed, stood 5 feet 11 inches (1.80 m) tall and weighed 178 pounds (81 kg). He was born in St. Louis, Missouri.

In 1955, after a 14–12 win–loss record in the Class A Western League, Harrison was called to Baltimore when the rosters expanded in September. He relieved starting pitcher Eddie Lopat in the fifth inning of the second game of a twinight doubleheader on September 23 at Griffith Stadium against the Washington Senators. Harrison hurled two innings and surrendered four bases on balls, two hits and two earned runs in a 7–3 Oriole defeat.

The following season, Harrison won 10 games and lost 12 in a year split between the Double-A Texas League and the Open-Classification Pacific Coast League. Recalled by the Orioles again, he started on September 26, 1956, at Memorial Stadium against the eventual world champion New York Yankees. He lasted only 1 2/3 innings, giving up three earned runs, three hits and five walks. However, Harrison was not charged with the 11–6 Baltimore defeat, as Hal Brown, who relieved him in the second inning, gave up the winning run. Altogether Harrison appeared in two MLB games, pitched in 3 2/3 innings, and gave up five earned runs, six hits, and five bases on balls. He did not record a strikeout. His eight-year pro career concluded after the 1958 season.

Harrison died in Fishers, Indiana on January 11, 2023, at the age of 92.
