= Sammy Vick =

American baseball player (1895–1986)

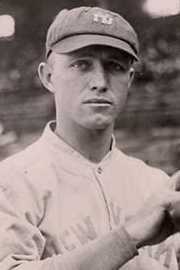
- Right fielder
- Born: April 12, 1895; Batesville, Mississippi, U.S.
- Died: August 17, 1986 (aged 91); Memphis, Tennessee, U.S.
- Batted: Right Threw: Right

MLB debut
- September 20, 1917, for the New York Yankees

Last MLB appearance
- September 24, 1921, for the Boston Red Sox

MLB statistics
- Batting average: .248
- Home runs: 2
- Runs batted in: 50
- Stats at Baseball Reference

Teams
- New York Yankees (1917–1920); Boston Red Sox (1921)

Samuel Bruce Vick (April 12, 1895 – August 17, 1986) was an American professional right fielder in Major League Baseball. He played for the New York Yankees from 1917 to 1920, and the Boston Red Sox in 1921. He stood 5 ft 10 in (1.78 m), and weighed 163 lb., and he batted and threw right-handed. He was born in Batesville, Mississippi, and attended Millsaps College in Jackson, Mississippi.

After playing one season of minor league baseball in 1917, Vick was signed by the Yankees and was used sparingly by them later that same season. He became their starting right fielder in 1919. With Babe Ruth's arrival, and Bob Meusel's emergence in 1920, Vick's productivity and playing time diminished. Following the season, he was traded to the Red Sox in a deal that brought future Hall of Famer pitcher Waite Hoyt to the Yankees. In his five-season career, Vick had a .248 batting average, with two home runs and 50 RBIs in 213 games played.

After his major league career ended after the 1921 season, he returned to the minor leagues and played in various leagues until 1930. Vick died, after a long illness, in Memphis, Tennessee, at age 91.

== Early life ==
Samuel Bruce Vick was born on April 12, 1895 in Batesville, Mississippi, to Hugh, a farmer, and Lillie. After attending Millsaps College in Jackson, Mississippi, he signed a minor league baseball contract with the Memphis Chickasaws of the Southern Association (SA). He played one season in Memphis, playing in 126 games, and had a .322 batting average along with 24 doubles and 12 triples. When the SA season was completed, he signed a contract with the New York Yankees of the American League (AL).

== Career ==
=== New York Yankees ===
Vick made his Major League Baseball (MLB) debut with the Yankees on September 20, 1917. He finished the season with the Yankees, playing in 10 games, all in right field. In 36 at bats during that stretch, he collected 10 hits for a .278 batting average. He played in just two games during the early part of the 1918 season, before being drafted into the military. The first appearance occurred on April 19, in the second game of a double header against the Boston Red Sox. He relieved starting right fielder Frank Gilhooley late in the game, and collected a hit in each of his two at bats against Red Sox pitcher, Babe Ruth. He had a run batted in (RBI) and scored a run in the game, although the Red Sox won the game by a score of 9 to 5. His other appearance that season was as a pinch hitter in a game against the Washington Senators on April 25, and failed to collect a hit.

In 1919, Vick became the Yankees's starting right fielder. On April 30, in his fourth appearance of the season, he led off the bottom of the first inning with a home run off Mule Watson of the Philadelphia Athletics: his first career home run. He struggled at the plate during the first two months of the season, with a batting average of .208 after the June 1 game. However, he began to increase his productivity in June and July. By early August, he had raised his average to a season-high of .266. It was during that time period when he hit his second, and last, major league home run. It was a grand slam off Allan Sothoron in a game on August 7: an 8–2 victory over the St. Louis Browns. For the remainder of the season, Vick's production had a steady, slow decline; he finished the season with a .248 batting average, along with 27 RBIs, 15 doubles, and nine triples.

Vick's playing time dwindled in 1920 with the arrival of Babe Ruth, an off-season purchase from the Red Sox. The Yankees now had an outfield that consisted of Ruth, established players of Duffy Lewis and Ping Bodie, and Bob Meusel, a rookie. Injuries to Lewis and Bodie allowed for periods of lengthy playing time for Vick in July and September. Later in the season, Vick and his manager Miller Huggins got into a heated argument, during which Vick punched Huggins. Appreciating Vick's spirit, the manager quickly forgave him. Vick's final totals in 1920 consisted of a .220 batting average in 51 games. During his time with the Yankees, the New York City sportswriters noted that he was prodigious eater. He was so much so that they proclaimed that any time someone ate a large meal, they were "doing a Sammy Vick."

=== Boston Red Sox ===
The Yankees felt that Vick had not lived up to his potential during his four seasons with the team. Considering the team now had a solid outfield of Ruth, Meusel, Lewis, and Bodie, and the Yankees needed pitching; Vick became expendable. On December 15, 1920, the Yankees traded Vick, Muddy Ruel, Del Pratt and Hank Thormahlen to the Red Sox for Waite Hoyt, Harry Harper, Wally Schang and Mike McNally.

Vick began the 1921 season with an injured leg, which did not allow him to play in either April or May. He did not appear in a game until June 2, and was mostly used as a pinch hitter and late-game replacement. He was absent from the line-up for most of July as well, until August when again, he was used mainly as a pinch hitter. In total, he played in just 44 games for the Red Sox, with only 15 games in the outfield; 12 of them starting the game. Vick had a season-total of 77 at bats, a .260 batting average, and nine RBIs.

== Post major league career ==
After the 1921 season, Vick continued his baseball career in the minor leagues. In 1922, he played for the Toronto Maple Leafs of the International League, batting .233 in 50 games played. He returned to the Memphis Chickasaws for one season in 1923, improving his average to .290. For the 1924 season, he joined the Brookhaven, Mississippi based Brookhaven Truckers of the Cotton States League (CSL) as player-manager, and he produced the best offensive numbers up to this point in his career. He batted .322 with 16 home runs, 21 doubles, and 11 triples.

In 1925, Vick stayed in the CSL and became the Laurel, Mississippi based Laurel Lumberjacks player-manager for two seasons. However, in 1926, his tenure was short, and he joined the New Orleans Pelicans of the SA as a player only for the remaining 32 games of the season. After batting .348 in 1926, he improved his average to .350 in 1927, along with career-highs in hits with 194, doubles with 39, and triples with 16. Staying in New Orleans for the 1928 season, his offensive numbers dropped, but he still batted .302 in 109 games played. His 1929 season was split between three teams; the Pelicans, the Chattanooga Lookouts of the SA, and the Dallas Steers of the Texas League. That season, he hit a career-high 17 home runs, along with a .333 batting average. He finished his minor league career back with Memphis in 1930.

=== Later life ===
According to the 1930 U.S. Census, he became a teacher at a public school in Panola County, Mississippi, following his baseball career. He was married to Lois Monteith, had three sons, and one daughter. Vick died on August 17, 1986 at age 91 in Memphis, Tennessee after a long illness, and is interred at Forrest Memorial Park located in Batesville.

== Bibliography ==
- Gallagher, Mark; Walter LeConte (2003). The Yankee Encyclopedia (6, illustrated ed.). Sports Publishing LLC. p. 500. ISBN 1582616833.
- Stout, Glenn; Dick Joshnson (2002). Yankees Century: 100 Years of New York Yankees Baseball (illustrated ed.). Houghton Mifflin Harcourt. p. 478. ISBN 0618085270.
- Wagenheim, Karl (2001). Babe Ruth: His Life and Legend (illustrated ed.). E-reads/E-rights. p. 316. ISBN 0759231508.
