= Buckville, Arkansas =

Unincorporated community in Arkansas, US

Coordinates: 34°37′N 93°21′W

Buckville is an unincorporated community in Garland County, Arkansas, United States. It is located on hillsides within the Ouachita National Forest. Originally, Buckville was located further down in the valley nearer the Ouachita River; however, with the construction of Blakely Mountain Dam and subsequent filling of Lake Ouachita, the old village was flooded out and a new place was built higher along the hillside.

== See also ==
- Buckville Cemetery

== Sources ==
- Rand-McNally World Atlas, 2009 Edition, p. 10
- Haymond's Complete World Atlas, 1952 Edition, p. 160.
