= Clay Hopper =

American baseball player (1902–1976)

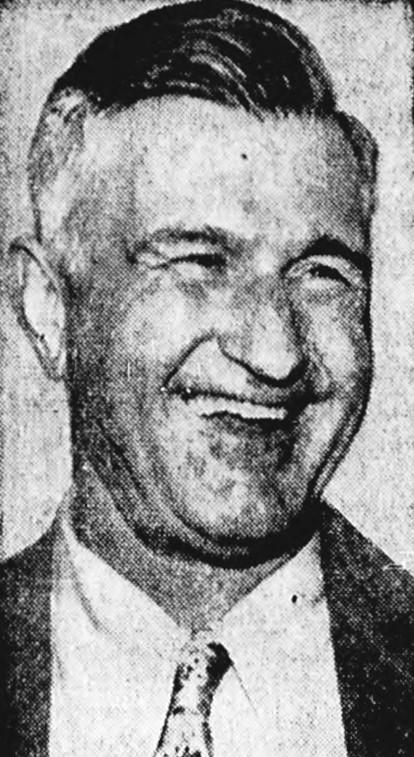
- Hopper, circa 1951
- Born: October 3, 1902; Porterville, Mississippi, U.S.
- Died: April 17, 1976 (aged 73); Greenwood, Mississippi, U.S.
- Batted: Right Threw: Right
- Stats at Baseball Reference

Member of the International League

Baseball Hall of Fame
- Induction: 2009

Robert Clay Hopper (October 3, 1902 – April 17, 1976) was an American professional baseball player and manager in minor league baseball. Hopper played from 1926 through 1941 and continued managing through 1956.

Managing the Montreal Royals of the International League in 1946, Hopper served as Jackie Robinson's first manager in integrated baseball. Hopper was named manager of the year with the Royals in 1946 and with the Portland Beavers of the Pacific Coast League in 1953. He was inducted into the International League Hall of Fame in 2009.

== Career ==
=== College ===
Hopper played collegiately at Mississippi State University, known as Mississippi A&M College at the time, and was a three-year letterman. A search of MSU athletic records from the period shows that Hopper's first collegiate year was as a member of legendary MSU head coach C.R. "Dudy" Noble's 1924 team that won the last of A&M's six baseball championships in the Southern Intercollegiate Athletic Association.

=== Minor leagues ===
Hopper played in minor league baseball from 1926 through 1941. On July 17, 1927, Hopper hit four home runs in a game for the Danville Veterans of the Illinois–Indiana–Iowa League. Joining the Rochester Red Wings of the International League for the final three weeks of the 1928 season as a substitute, Hopper helped lead the team to the league's pennant.

=== Manager ===
Hopper became a player-manager with the Laurel Cardinals in 1929. He played for the Greensboro Patriots in 1930 but did not manage the team. He managed the Scottsdale Cardinals in 1931 and was then hired by the St. Louis Cardinals organization as a player-manager for the Elmira Red Wings. He managed the Greensburg Redwings of the Pennsylvania State Association to the league championship in 1934. After managing the Springfield Cardinals of the Western Association to a second-place finish in 1938, he was promoted to manage the Columbus Red Birds of the South Atlantic League in 1939. He was promoted to manage the Houston Buffaloes of the Texas League in 1942.

Hopper joined the Brooklyn Dodgers organization in 1942. He managed the Mobile Bears of the Southern Association in 1945, leading them to the league championship. He was promoted to become the manager for the Montreal Royals of the International League for the 1946 season. That year Jackie Robinson, the first black player to integrate baseball since the 1880s, entered the Dodgers farm system and was assigned to the Royals. Hopper, who opposed integration of baseball at the time, asked Branch Rickey, the general manager of the Dodgers, to assign Robinson to a different Dodgers affiliate, but Rickey kept Robinson assigned to Montreal. Robinson reported that Hopper treated him well, and the Royals won the Governors' Cup as the International League champions. The Sporting News named Hopper the Manager of the Year for all of minor league baseball that season. Hopper recommended the Dodgers promote Robinson to the major leagues for the 1947 season.

Hopper remained Montreal's manager through the 1949 season. Between 1946 and 1949, Hopper managed three Governors' Cup champions. In 1950, Rickey assigned Hopper to manage the St. Paul Saints of the American Association, as Walter Alston became Montreal's manager.

From 1952 through 1955, Hopper managed the Portland Beavers of the Pacific Coast League (PCL), which at the time was unaffiliated with an MLB franchise. He was named the PCL manager of the year in 1953. Hopper managed the Hollywood Stars of the PCL, a Pittsburgh Pirates affiliate, in 1956. He retired from baseball following the season.

He ranks #15 of all time in minor league wins by a manager. Hopper was posthumously inducted into the International League Hall of Fame in 2009.

== Personal ==
Hopper lived in Greenwood, Mississippi. He worked as a cotton broker during the baseball offseason.

Hopper is portrayed by Brett Cullen in 42, the 2013 biopic about Robinson.
