= Jim Bivin =

American baseball player (1909-1982)

- Pitcher
- Born: December 11, 1909; Jackson, Mississippi, U.S.
- Died: November 7, 1982 (aged 72); Pueblo, Colorado, U.S.
- Batted: lefty Threw: Right

MLB debut
- April 16, 1935, for the Philadelphia Phillies

Last MLB appearance
- September 29, 1935, for the Philadelphia Phillies

MLB statistics
- Win–loss record: 2–9
- Earned run average: 5.79
- Strikeouts: 54
- Stats at Baseball Reference

Teams
- Philadelphia Phillies (1935)

James Nathaniel Bivin (December 11, 1909 – November 7, 1982) was an American pitcher in Major League Baseball. He appeared in 47 games (14 starts) for the Philadelphia Phillies in 1935. Afterwards, he went on to a lengthy career as a minor league baseball manager. He was the last major league pitcher faced by Babe Ruth, on May 30, 1935. (Ruth grounded out to first; it was the only time Bivin faced Ruth.)
