= Cotton Knaupp =

American baseball player (1889–1967)

- Shortstop
- Born: August 13, 1889; San Antonio, Texas, U.S.
- Died: July 6, 1967 (aged 77); New Orleans, Louisiana, U.S.
- Batted: Right Threw: Right

MLB debut
- August 30, 1910, for the Cleveland Naps

Last MLB appearance
- August 28, 1911, for the Cleveland Naps

MLB statistics
- Batting average: .184
- Home runs: 0
- Runs batted in: 11
- Stats at Baseball Reference

Teams
- Cleveland Naps (1910–1911)

Henry Antone "Cotton" Knaupp (August 13, 1889 – July 6, 1967) was an American Major League Baseball player. A shortstop during his major league career, Knaupp batted from the right side and threw with his right hand. He had a listed height of 5 ft 9 in (1.75 m), and a listed weight of 165 pounds.

Knaupp spent parts of two seasons in the major leagues with the Cleveland Naps, known today as the Cleveland Indians. He appeared in 31 games, compiling a .184 batting average, a .252 on-base percentage, and a .245 slugging percentage in 98 at bats. Knaupp continued playing professionally after the end of his major league career, and he achieved a notable milestone in 1916. While playing second base for the New Orleans Pelicans on August 8, 1916, Knaupp became the only player in the history of the Southern Association to turn an unassisted triple play.
