= Orth Collins =

American baseball player (1880–1949)

- Outfielder
- Born: February 27, 1880; Lafayette, Indiana, U.S.
- Died: December 13, 1949 (aged 69); Fort Lauderdale, Florida, U.S.
- Batted: Left Threw: Right

MLB debut
- June 1, 1904, for the New York Highlanders

Last MLB appearance
- July 27, 1909, for the Washington Senators

MLB statistics
- Games played: 13
- At bats: 24
- Hits: 6
- Stats at Baseball Reference

Teams
- New York Highlanders (1904); Washington Senators (1909)

Orth Stein "Buck" Collins (April 27, 1880 – December 13, 1949) was an American Major League Baseball outfielder and pitcher. Collins played for the New York Highlanders in 1904 and the Washington Senators in 1909. In 13 career games, he had six hits, all for the Highlanders, and a .250 batting average.

He batted left and threw right-handed. He also pitched in one game for Washington, in 1909, pitching one inning, and collecting a strikeout.

Collins was born in Lafayette, Indiana, and died in Fort Lauderdale, Florida at age 69.
