= George Blackburn (baseball) =

American baseball player and coach (1869–1938)

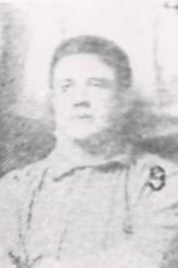
- Pitcher
- Born: September 21, 1869; Ozark, Missouri, US
- Died: December 29, 1938 (aged 69); Oklahoma City, Oklahoma, US
- Batted: Unknown Threw: Right

MLB debut
- July 6, 1897, for the Baltimore Orioles

Last MLB appearance
- July 24, 1897, for the Baltimore Orioles

MLB statistics
- Win–loss record: 2–2
- Earned run average: 6.82
- Strikeouts: 1

Teams
- Baltimore Orioles (1897)

George W. Blackburn [Smiling George] (September 21, 1869 – December 29, 1938) was an American right-handed pitcher in Major League Baseball who played for the Baltimore Orioles in the 1897 season. A native of Ozark, Missouri, he spent 17 years in baseball as a player, coach, and manager

Blackburn posted a 2–2 record with a 6.82 earned run average in five pitching appearances with the Orioles, allowing 30 runs (25 earned) on 34 hits and 12 walks while striking out one batter in 33 innings of work.

On July 16, 1897, Cap Anson of the Chicago Cubs became the first player in major league history to reach 3,000 hits when he singled off Blackburn.

Blackburn also pitched for 34 different minor league teams from 1892 through 1909 and managed six of its teams in 1896 (two), 1903 and from 1907 to 1909, retiring at the age of 48. His date of death is missing.

Blackburn died in Oklahoma City on December 29, 1938, at the age of 69. He donated his body to a medical school.
