= Bobby Rothermel =

American baseball player (1870–1927)

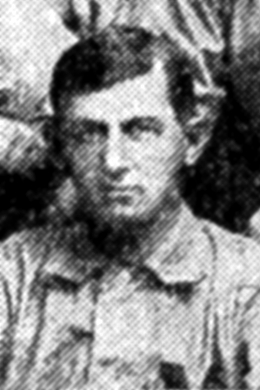
- Infielder
- Born: December 18, 1870; Fleetwood, Pennsylvania, U.S.
- Died: February 11, 1927 (aged 56); Detroit, Michigan, U.S.
- Batted: Unknown Threw: Right

MLB debut
- June 18, 1899, for the Baltimore Orioles

Last MLB appearance
- July 15, 1899, for the Baltimore Orioles

MLB statistics
- Games played: 10
- Hits: 2
- Batting average: .095
- Stats at Baseball Reference

Teams
- Baltimore Orioles (1899)

Edward Hill "Bobby" Rothermel (December 18, 1870 – February 11, 1927) was an American infielder in Major League Baseball for one season with the Baltimore Orioles in 1899.
