= Mike Welday =

American baseball player (1878–1942)

- Outfielder
- Born: December 13, 1878; Conway, Iowa
- Died: May 28, 1942 (aged 63); Leavenworth, Kansas
- Batted: Left Threw: Left

MLB debut
- April 17, 1907, for the Chicago White Sox

Last MLB appearance
- July 8, 1909, for the Chicago White Sox

MLB statistics
- Batting average: .202
- Home runs: 0
- RBI: 5

Teams
- Chicago White Sox (1907, 1909)

Lyndon Earl "Mike" Welday (December 13, 1878 – May 28, 1942) was a left-handed Major League Baseball outfielder who played for the Chicago White Sox in 1907 and 1909.

He made his major league debut on April 21, 1907. He spent 24 games with the White Sox that season, batting .229 in 35 at-bats. Of his eight hits, one was a double and one was a triple. He did not play in the majors in 1908, however in 1909 he played in 29 games, hitting .189 in 74 at-bats. He played his final game on July 8, 1909. On August 18, 1909, he was sent by the White Sox to a minor league team to complete a deal made on July 9, 1909. The White Sox sent players to be named later to the Providence Grays for Lena Blackburne.

Overall, he hit .202 in 53 major league games, collecting 22 hits in 109 at-bats. He had five runs, five RBI and two stolen bases. In the field, he committed six errors in 39 games for a .900 fielding percentage.

Welday also spent 10 (non-consecutive) seasons playing in the minor leagues, from 1901 to 1915. He played in at least 671 minor league games in his career. In 1906 with the Des Moines Champs, Welday hit .359 with 197 hits in 120 games.

Following his death, he was interred at Mount Muncie Cemetery in Lansing, Kansas.
