= Greenville Bucks =

American baseball team

The Greenville Bucks or sometimes Buckshots were a Cotton States League baseball team in Greenville, Mississippi that existed from 1922 to 1955. They were affiliated with the Memphis Chicks in the 1930s, the New York Yankees in the 1940s and the Detroit Tigers in the 1950s. Their home fields included High School Park, Recreation Park, and Sportsman Park.

The writer Shelby Foote followed the Bucks as a youth, and recalls this in interviews in Ken Burns' 1994 documentary Baseball.
