= Joe Rullo =

American baseball player (1916-1969)

- Second baseman
- Born: June 16, 1916; New York City, New York, U.S.
- Died: October 28, 1969 (aged 53); Philadelphia, Pennsylvania, U.S.
- Batted: Right Threw: Right

MLB debut
- September 22, 1943, for the Philadelphia Athletics

Last MLB appearance
- July 4, 1944, for the Philadelphia Athletics

MLB statistics
- Batting average: .212
- Home runs: 0
- Runs batted in: 11
- Stats at Baseball Reference

Teams
- Philadelphia Athletics (1943–1944)

Joseph Vincent Rullo (June 16, 1916 – October 28, 1969) was an American professional baseball player.

Rullo attended South Philadelphia High School where he was not selected for the school's baseball team because he was too small. He nonetheless earned a professional contract on the strength of his play in sandlot ball.

He was a second baseman over parts of two seasons (1943–44) with the Philadelphia Athletics. For his career, he compiled a .212 batting average in 151 at-bats, with 11 runs batted in.

After his playing career ended, he spent several seasons as a minor league manager.

He was born in New York City and died in Philadelphia, at the age of 53.
