= El Dorado Oilers =

- 1929–1955; (1929–1941, 1947–1955); El Dorado, Arkansas

Minor league affiliations
- Previous classes: Class C (1933–1941, 1947–1955); Class D (1929–1932)
- League: Cotton States League (1936–1941, 1947–1955)
- Previous leagues: East Dixie League (1934–1935); Dixie League (1933); Cotton States League (1929–1932)

Major league affiliations
- Previous teams: New York Giants (1955); Cincinnati Reds (1936–1939)

Minor league titles
- League titles: 1929, 1936, 1937, 1954

Team data
- Previous names: El Dorado Oilers (1941, 1947–1955); El Dorado Lions (1929–1940)

The El Dorado Oilers Cotton States League baseball team based in El Dorado, Arkansas that played in 1941 and from 1947 to 1955. They also played as the El Dorado Lions from 1929 to 1940. They were affiliated with the New York Giants in 1951.

In 1954, under manager Bill Adair, they won their only league championship.
