= Meridian Mets =

The Meridian Mets were a Mississippi State League (1921) and Cotton States League (1922–1923; 1925–1929) baseball team based in Meridian, Mississippi, United States. Multiple major leaguers played for the team.
