= Use of nigger in proper names =

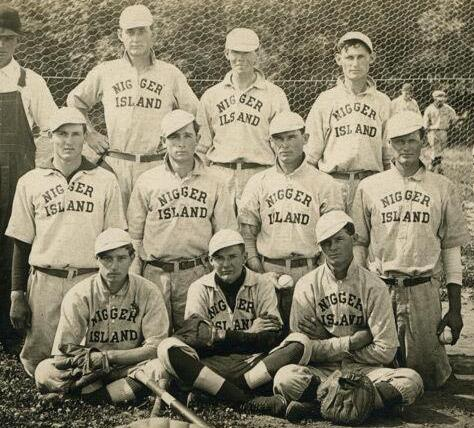
Group photograph of an early 20th-century baseball team from Ohio

The word nigger has historically been used in the names of products, colors, plants, as place names, and as people's nicknames, among others, but has fallen out of favor since the 20th century.

== Commercial products ==
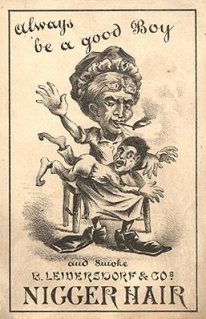
Poster for "Nigger Hair" tobacco, later known as "Bigger Hair"

The word nigger was often featured in branding and packaging consumer products. In 1925, the Matthes Coal and Construction Company was marketing "Niggerhead Coal" as more efficient and a better buy than soft coal. Bouclé fabric was called "niggerhead" in advertisements. An Australian company produced various sorts of licorice candy under the "Nigger Boy" label. These included candy cigarettes and one box with an image of an Indian snake charmer. Compare these with the various national varieties and names for chocolate-coated marshmallow treats, and with Darlie, formerly Darkie, toothpaste. As the term became less acceptable in mainstream culture, product names were changed. "Nigger Hair Tobacco" became "Bigger Hair", and "Niggerhead Oysters" became "Negro Head".

== Plant and animal names ==
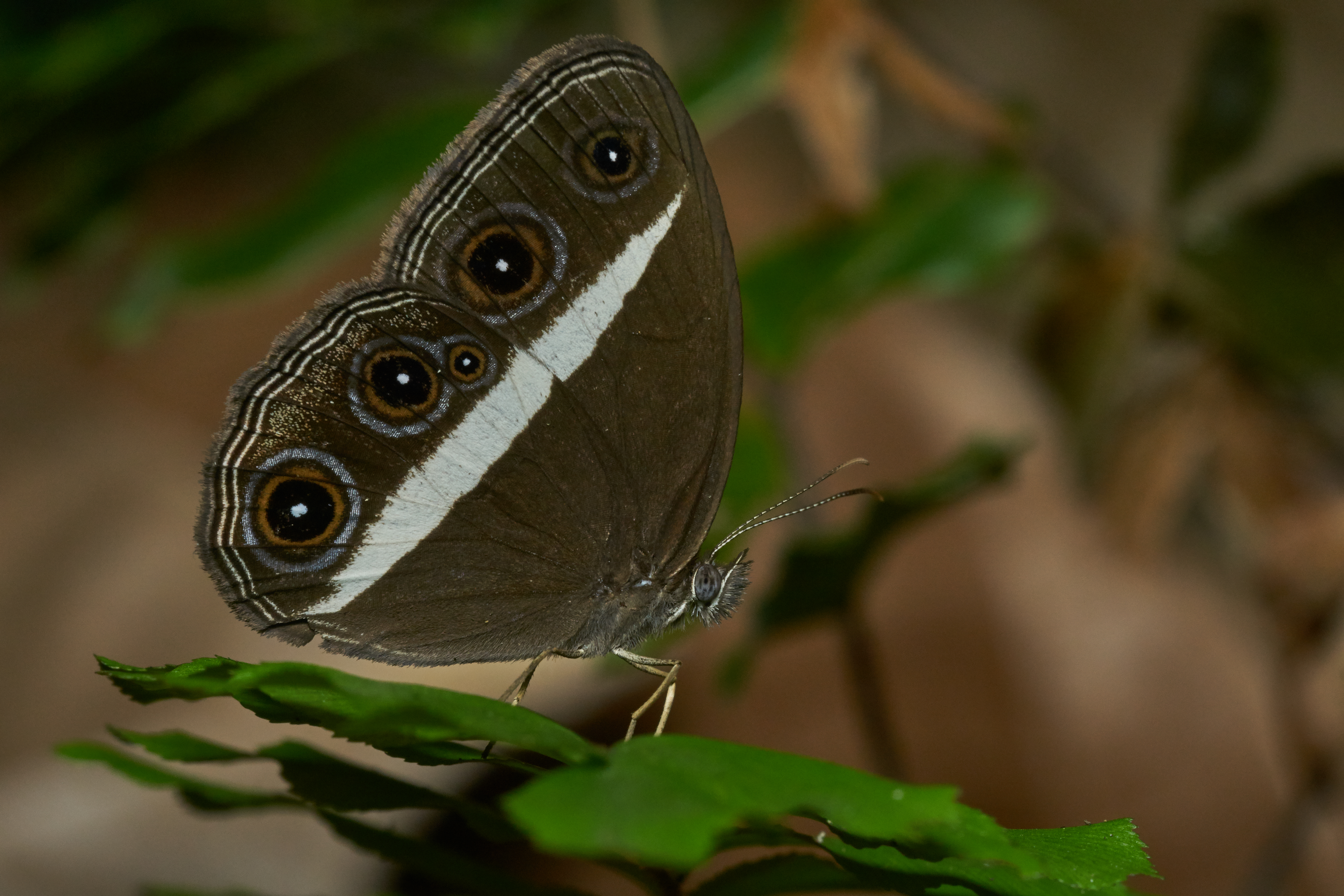
Orsotriaena medus, once known as the nigger butterfly

Some colloquial or local names for plants and animals used to include the word "nigger" or "niggerhead.” One of the colloquial names for echinacea (coneflower) was "niggerhead.” The cotton-top cactus (Homalocephala polycephala, syn. Echinocactus polycephalus) is a round, cabbage-sized plant covered with large, crooked thorns, and used to be known in Arizona as the "niggerhead cactus". In the early 20th century, double-crested cormorants (Phalacrocorax auritus) were known in some areas of Florida as "nigger geese". In some parts of the U.S., Brazil nuts were known as "nigger toes". Red cabbage (Brassica oleracea var. capitata) was sometimes called "niggerhead cabbage" in the United States, and in Britain at least as recently as the 1980s.

The "niggerhead termite" (Nasutitermes graveolus) is a native of Australia.

The butterfly Orsotriaena medus had historically been called "the nigger", referring to its dark brown colour, but it has been renamed in Australian faunal works to "smooth-eyed bushbrown", "medus brown" in India, and "dark grass-brown" in Southeast Asia.

The black Labrador dog owned by Guy Gibson, Squadron Leader of RAF 617 Squadron, 'The Dam Busters', was called Nigger. In 21st-century re-runs on UK (at least) TV, scenes in which the dog's name is mentioned are cut. The dog was run over outside the airfield, and in 2020 a memorial at the spot was replaced with one on which the dog's name is not mentioned.

American cosmic horror author H.P. Lovecraft's black cat was called Nigger-man. Lovecraft owned the cat from childhood until its death in 1904. Lovecraft also used the name for a fictional cat in The Rats in the Walls, first published in 1924.

== Colors ==
A shade of dark brown used to be known as "nigger brown" or simply "nigger"; other colours were also prefixed with the word. Usage for colors continued for some time after it was no longer acceptable for people. Nigger brown commonly identified a colour in the clothing industry and advertising of the early 20th century.

== Nicknames of people ==
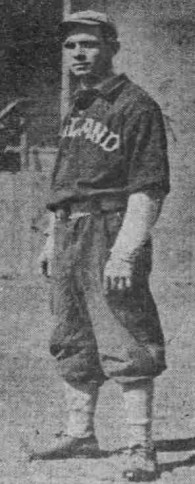
Nig Perrine

During the Spanish–American War U.S. Army General John J. Pershing's original nickname, Nigger Jack, given to him as an instructor at West Point because of his service with "Buffalo Soldier" units, was euphemized to Black Jack by reporters.

In the first half of the twentieth century, before Major League Baseball was racially integrated, many darker-complexioned players were nicknamed Nig; examples are: Johnny Beazley (1941–49), Joe Berry (1921–22), Bobby Bragan (1940–48), Nig Clarke (1905–20), George Cuppy (1892–1901), Nig Fuller (1902), Johnny Grabowski (1923–31), Nig Lipscomb (1937), Charlie Niebergall (1921–24), Nig Perrine (1907), and Frank Smith (1904–15).

The 1933 movie The Bowery with George Raft and Wallace Beery includes a sports bar in New York City named "Nigger Joe's".

In 1960, a stand at the stadium in Toowoomba, Australia, was named the "E. S. 'Nigger' Brown Stand", honoring 1920s rugby league player Edwin Brown, ironically nicknamed because of his pale white skin; his tombstone is engraved Nigger. Stephen Hagan, a lecturer at the Kumbari/Ngurpai Lag Higher Education Center of the University of Southern Queensland, sued the Toowoomba council over the use of nigger in the stand's name; the district and state courts dismissed his lawsuit. He appealed to the High Court of Australia, who ruled the naming matter beyond federal jurisdiction. At first, some Aboriginal Australians did not share Hagan's opposition to nigger. Hagan appealed to the United Nations, winning a committee recommendation to the Australian federal government, that it force the Queensland state government to remove the word nigger from the "E. S. 'Nigger' Brown Stand" name. The Australian federal government followed the High Court's jurisdiction ruling. In September 2008, the stand was demolished. The Queensland Sports Minister, Judy Spence, said that using nigger would be unacceptable, for the stand or on any commemorative plaque. The 2005 book The N Word: One Man's Stand by Hagan includes this episode.

In South Sudan, people who are affiliated with local street gangs or local street gangs themselves are called "niggers".

== Place names ==
Many places once had names that included the word "nigger", sometimes named after a person, or a historical event, or for a perceived resemblance of a geographic feature to a human being (see Niggerhead). Most of these place names have long since been changed.

The majority of places with the word in their name were located in the United States, Canada, Australia and New Zealand.

=== Australia ===
The term "nigger" has historically been used in several Australian place names, especially in Queensland.

In 2003, two creeks in Wondecla, Queensland, previously known as Nigger Creek and North Nigger Creek, were renamed to Wondecla Creek and North Wondecla Creek respectively. This was met with opposition from a local council, which defended the use as a testimony to the region's history. Similarly (although decades earlier), a local school, opened as Nigger Creek Provisional School in 1883, was renamed Nigger Creek State School in 1909 and then Wondecla State School in 1922. The school closed in 1958.

In 2017, several place names in Queensland such as the island of Nigger Head (which is currently unnamed), were changed due to their use of terms such as "nigger".

There is a creek in Northern Territory named "Nigger Creek". As of 2026 the Northern Territory Place Names Register is in the process of renaming the creek.

In 2022 the Tasmanian Government controversially printed new maps showing a rock named "Niggerhead Rock". "Niggerhead Rock", along with "Suicide Bay", "Victory Hill" and several other places, have been renamed with Tasmanian Aboriginal names. The new names are Karanutung, Luwuka and Timuk, respectively.

=== Canada ===
At Penticton, British Columbia, "Niggertoe Mountain" was renamed Mount Nkwala. The place-name derived from a 1908 Christmas story about three black men who died in a blizzard; the next day, the bodies of two were found at the foot of the mountain. John Ware, an influential cowboy in early Alberta, has several features named after him, including "Nigger John Ridge", which is now John Ware Ridge.

In 2015, the Commission de toponymie du Québec ordered name changes for 11 places in the province that contained variations of the word, including Nigger Rapids, a site on the Gatineau River named for a Black couple who drowned there in the early 1900s.

=== Finland ===
An island in North Karelia named Neekerisaari (lit. 'Nigger Island') had its name removed in 2020. It is now known as Seppänen.

A neighborhood in Vaasa called Neekerikylä - so named because the houses were first painted with black tar paint before white paint was available - had its name changed to Aalto-puisto, because most inhabitants found the name problematic.

=== New Zealand ===
In December 2016, the New Zealand Geographic Board changed three place names in Canterbury in the South Island. Nigger Hill, Niggerhead, and Nigger Stream were renamed Kānuka Hills, Tawhai Hill, and Pūkio Stream, respectively. However, other racially charged place names remain, including "Darkies Creek", "Darkies Terrace Track", and "Darkies Terrace" in South Island, named after African-American prospector Arthur "Darkie" Addison in the 1860s, and "Darkie Stream" in North Island.

=== Turks and Caicos Islands ===
There is an island near South Caicos called Nigger Cay.

=== United States ===
In West Texas, "Dead Nigger Creek" was renamed "Dead Negro Draw"; both names probably commemorate the Buffalo Soldier tragedy of 1877. Curtis Island in Maine used to be known as either Negro or Nigger Island. The island was renamed in 1934 after Cyrus H. K. Curtis, publisher of the Saturday Evening Post, who lived locally. It had a baseball team who wore uniforms emblazoned with "Nigger Island" (or in one case, "Nigger Ilsand"). Negro Head Road, or Nigger Head Road, referred to many places in the Old South where black body parts were displayed in warning (see Lynching in the United States). In Los Angeles, Nigger Alley or Negro Alley was used on maps to signify the street originally called Calle de los Negros in the Spanish and Mexican period, referring to Afromestizo or mulatto Mexican residents.

In Saint Paul, Minnesota, a small pond was named "Nigger Lake", but was changed to "Dead Horse Lake" in the 1930s.

On July 27, 1962, citing a standard of "offensive to many", and "no one now would suggest a new name including the word", Secretary of the Interior Stewart Udall sent a letter to the United States Geological Survey's board chairman to press for a plan to remove the use of the word "nigger" anywhere it appeared in the organization's topographical maps product, and to request a policy for and change of all occurrences of it on its maps. This led to a wider codified policy by the USGS against use of any ethnic slur in any map name. Where "nigger" appeared on USGS map objects and another suitable name had not been offered, it was changed to "negro", by 1967. There were, however, communities who did not comply, and disputes extended into the 1970s. In 1971, about 300 students at the University of Vermont protested property owned by the university under the names "Niggerhead Pond" and "Niggerhead Mountain".

During the 2012 United States presidential election campaign in October 2011, the Washington Post reported that Rick Perry, candidate for the Republican nomination, leases a hunting camp once called "Niggerhead". Although it had not been named by him nor his family, according to some local residents interviewed by the Post the Perrys used the camp for years before painting over a large rock with that name on it which stands at an entrance; however, Perry's campaign stated that the Perrys painted over the rock almost immediately after acquiring a lease on the property in 1983.

Some renamings honor a real person. As early as 1936, "Nigger Hollow" in Pennsylvania, named after Daniel Hughes, a free black man who saved others on the Underground Railroad, was renamed Freedom Road. "Nigger Nate Grade Road", near Temecula, California, named for Nate Harrison, an ex-slave and settler, was renamed "Nathan Harrison Grade Road" in 1955, at the request of the NAACP.

Sometimes other substitutes for "nigger" were used. "Nigger Head Mountain", at Burnet, Texas, was named because the forest atop it resembled a black man's hair. In 1966, the First Lady, Lady Bird Johnson, denounced the racist name, asking the U.S. Board on Geographic Names and the U.S. Forest Service to rename it, becoming "Colored Mountain" in 1968. Other renamings were more creative. "Nigger Head Rock", protruding from a cliff above Highway 421, north of Pennington Gap, Virginia, was renamed "Great Stone Face" in the 1970s.

Some names have been metaphorically or literally wiped off the map. In the 1990s, the public authorities stripped the names of "Niggertown Marsh" and the neighbouring Niggertown Knoll in Florida from public record and maps, which was the site of an early settlement of freed black people. A watercourse in the Sacramento Valley was known as Big Nigger Sam's Slough.

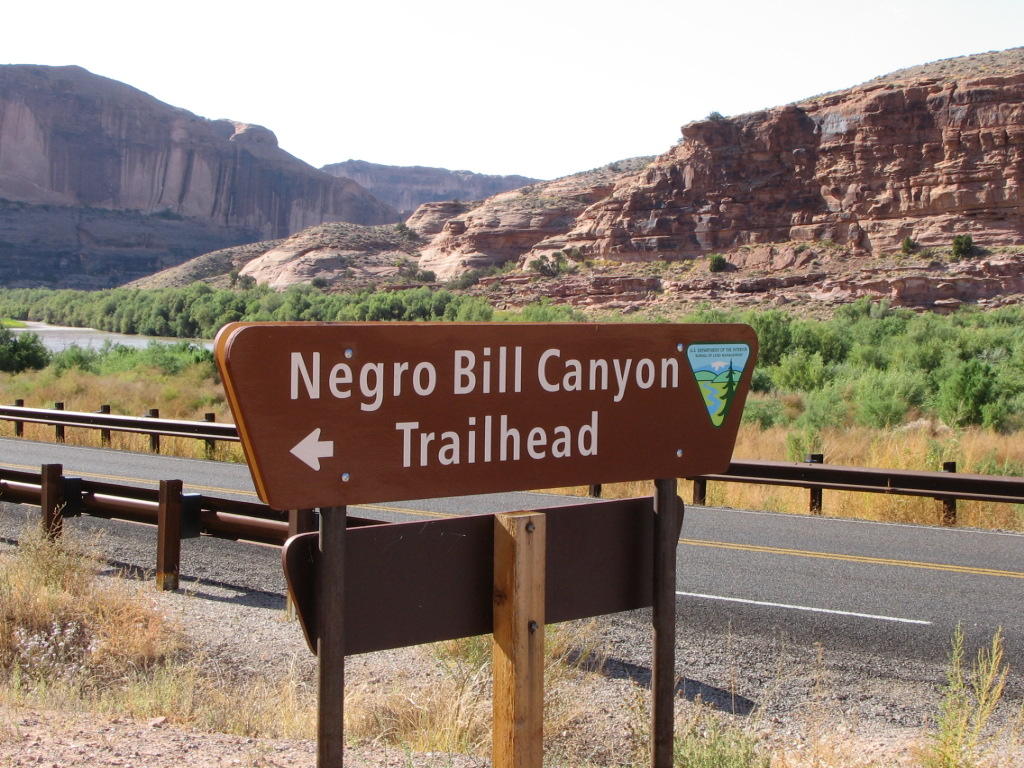
Sign replaced in September 2016

Sometimes a name changes more than once: a peak above Santa Monica, California was first renamed "Negrohead Mountain", and in February 2010 was renamed again to Ballard Mountain, in honor of John Ballard, a black pioneer who settled the area in the nineteenth century. A point on the Lower Mississippi River, in West Baton Rouge Parish, that was named "Free Nigger Point" until the late twentieth century, first was renamed "Free Negro Point", but currently is named "Wilkinson Point". "Nigger Bill Canyon" in southeast Utah was named after William Grandstaff, a mixed-race cowboy who lived there in the late 1870s. In the 1960s, it was renamed Negro Bill Canyon. Within the past few years, there has been a campaign to rename it again, as Grandstaff Canyon, but this is opposed by the local NAACP chapter, whose president said "Negro is an acceptable word". However the trailhead for the hiking trail up the canyon was renamed in September 2016 to "Grandstaff Trailhead". The new sign for the trailhead was stolen within five days of installation.

In 2009, research scientists for the New York State Department of Environmental Conservation learned that there were geographical features and roads in the state still bearing the word "nigger" in official sources. Searches of regulatory indices and maps revealed even further examples in Tompkins County and Hamilton County. In 2011, the department began the process of scrubbing those names from official documents.
