= Niggerhead (disambiguation) =

Niggerhead is a former name for several things thought to resemble the head of a black person.

Niggerhead may also refer to:

== Plants formerly known as niggerhead ==
- Carex secta, a New Zealand sedge
- Homalocephala polycephala, syn. Echinocactus polycephalus, a North American cactus
- Enneapogon nigricans, an Australian grass
- Rudbeckia hirta, a flowering plant in the family Asteraceae

== Other uses ==
- Nigger Head, an island in North Queensland, Australia
- Nigger Head Road, a place in North Carolina, U.S., with similar displays in other Southern towns
- Tawhai Hill, a hill in New Zealand, formerly known as Niggerhead

== See also ==
- Nigger (disambiguation)
- Use of nigger in proper names
