= Nigger (disambiguation) =

Nigger usually refers to the ethnic slur directed at black people, or nigga, the colloquial slang derived from it.

Nigger or Nigga may also refer to:

== Literature ==
- The Nigger, a 1909 play by Edward Sheldon
- Nigger: An Autobiography by Dick Gregory, a book, 1964
- Nigger: The Strange Career of a Troublesome Word, a book by Randall Kennedy, 2002

== Music ==
- Flex (singer), formerly known as "Nigga"
- "Nigger, Nigger", and other songs using nigger in their title, by Johnny Rebel in the 1960s
- "Nigger" (Clawfinger song), 1993
- Strictly 4 My N.I.G.G.A.Z..., 1993 album by Tupac Shakur
- Untitled Nas album, originally titled Nigger, 2008
- N.I.G.G.E.R. (The Slave and the Master), song by Nas, 2008

== Other uses ==
- Nigger (dog), a black labrador belonging to a British air force officer; both dog and man feature in the film Dambusters
- Nigger butterfly, historic name for Orsotriaena medus

== See also ==
- Nigg (disambiguation)
- Niggerhead (disambiguation)
- N-word (disambiguation)
- Niger (disambiguation)
- List of ethnic slurs
- Nigger in the woodpile, an American figure of speech (late 19th-early 20th centuries)
- The Nigger of the Narcissus, an 1897 novel by Joseph Conrad
- Use of nigger in proper names
- Use of nigger in the arts
- Monteniggers, Montenegrin hip-hop band
- Niggor (born 1971), Montenegrin hip-hop and electronic artist
- Controversies about the word niggardly
- Kees Neggers (born 1947), Dutch internet pioneer
