= 1937 St. Louis Browns season =

Major League Baseball season

1937 St. Louis Browns
- League: American League
- Ballpark: Sportsman's Park
- City: St. Louis, Missouri
- Record: 46–108 (.299)
- League place: 8th
- Owners: Donald Lee Barnes
- General managers: Bill DeWitt
- Managers: Rogers Hornsby and Jim Bottomley
- Radio: KMOX (France Laux, Jim Alt); KWK (Johnny O'Hara, Ray Schmidt, Allan Anthony)

The 1937 St. Louis Browns season involved the Browns finishing 8th in the American League with a record of 46 wins and 108 losses. Despite finishing last, the Browns as a team hit .285, which was higher than the American League average of .281. Pitching was the problem - the team's ERA was 6.00 compared to the American League average of 4.62.

== Offseason ==
- December 2, 1936: Ray Pepper was purchased from the Browns by the Buffalo Bisons.

== Regular season ==
=== Season standings ===
American League
Team	W	L	Pct.	GB	Home	Road
New York Yankees	102	52	.662	—	57‍–‍20	45‍–‍32
Detroit Tigers	89	65	.578	13	49‍–‍28	40‍–‍37
Chicago White Sox	86	68	.558	16	47‍–‍30	39‍–‍38
Cleveland Indians	83	71	.539	19	50‍–‍28	33‍–‍43
Boston Red Sox	80	72	.526	21	44‍–‍29	36‍–‍43
Washington Senators	73	80	.477	28½	43‍–‍35	30‍–‍45
Philadelphia Athletics	54	97	.358	46½	27‍–‍50	27‍–‍47
St. Louis Browns	46	108	.299	56	25‍–‍51	21‍–‍57

=== Record vs. opponents ===
1937 American League record Sources:
Team	BOS	CWS	CLE	DET	NYY	PHA	SLB	WSH
Boston	—	10–12	11–11	12–10–1	7–15	17–3	15–7	8–14–1
Chicago	12–10	—	10–12	8–14	9–13	15–7	18–4	14–8
Cleveland	11–11	12–10	—	11–11	7–15–1	13–9	18–4–1	11–11
Detroit	10–12–1	14–8	11–11	—	9–13	14–8	15–7	16–6
New York	15–7	13–9	15–7–1	13–9	—	14–8	16–6–1	16–6–1
Philadelphia	3–17	7–15	9–13	8–14	8–14	—	11–11	8–13–3
St. Louis	7–15	4–18	4–18–1	7–15	6–16–1	11–11	—	7–15
Washington	14–8–1	8–14	11–11	6–16	6–16–1	13–8–3	15–7	—

=== Notable transactions ===
- April 13, 1937: Bill Trotter was signed as a free agent by the Browns.

=== Roster ===
1937 St. Louis Browns
Roster
Pitchers: 25 Ed Baecht; 23 Emil Bildilli; 14 Sheriff Blake; 23 Julio Bonetti; 20 Earl Caldwell; 25 George Hennessey; 18 Oral Hildebrand; 16 Elon Hogsett; -- Harry Kimberlin; 17 Jack Knott; 12,22 Lou Koupal; 25 Bill Miller; -- Lefty Mills; -- Bob Muncrief; 14 Bill Strickland; 25 Tommy Thomas; 19 Les Tietje; 9 Bill Trotter; 21 Russ Van Atta; 24 Jim Walkup	Catchers: 12 Tony Giuliani; -- Sam Harshany; 19,30 Tommy Heath; 11 Rollie Hemsley; 28 Ben Huffman; Infielders: 26 Red Barkley; 2 Jim Bottomley; 3 Tom Carey; 7 Harlond Clift; 27 Harry Davis; 4 Rogers Hornsby; 1 Bill Knickerbocker; 15 Nig Lipscomb	Outfielders: 8 Ethan Allen; 10 Beau Bell; 37 Tom Cafego; 29 Eddie Silber; 5 Joe Vosmik; 6 Sam West; Other batters: 29 Mel Mazzera	Manager: 2 Jim Bottomley; 4 Rogers Hornsby; Coaches: 2 Jim Bottomley; 26 Charley O'Leary

== Player stats ==
= Indicates team leader

= Indicates league leader

=== Batting ===
==== Starters by position ====
Note: Pos = Position; G = Games played; AB = At bats; H = Hits; Avg. = Batting average; HR = Home runs; RBI = Runs batted in

Pos	Player	G	AB	H	Avg.	HR	RBI
C	Rollie Hemsley	100	334	74	.222	3	28
1B	Harry Davis	120	450	124	.276	3	35
2B	Tom Carey	130	487	134	.275	1	40
SS	Bill Knickerbocker	121	491	128	.261	4	61
3B	Harlond Clift	155	571	175	.306	29	118
OF	Sam West	122	457	150	.328	7	58
OF	Beau Bell	156	642	218	.340	14	117
OF	Joe Vosmik	144	594	193	.325	4	93

==== Other batters ====
Note: G = Games played; AB = At bats; H = Hits; Avg. = Batting average; HR = Home runs; RBI = Runs batted in

Player	G	AB	H	Avg.	HR	RBI
Ethan Allen	103	320	101	.316	0	31
Ben Huffman	76	176	48	.273	1	24
Jim Bottomley	65	109	26	.239	1	12
Red Barkley	31	101	27	.267	0	14
Nig Lipscomb	36	96	31	.323	0	8
Eddie Silber	22	83	26	.313	0	4
Rogers Hornsby	20	56	18	.321	1	11
Tony Giuliani	19	53	16	.302	0	3
Tommy Heath	17	43	10	.233	1	3
Sam Harshany	5	11	1	.091	0	0
Mel Mazzera	7	7	2	.286	0	0
Tom Cafego	4	4	0	.000	0	0

=== Pitching ===
==== Starting pitchers ====
Note: G = Games pitched; IP = Innings pitched; W = Wins; L = Losses; ERA = Earned run average; SO = Strikeouts

Player	G	IP	W	L	ERA	SO
Oral Hildebrand	30	201.1	8	17	5.14	75
Elon Hogsett	37	177.1	6	19	6.29	68
Les Tietje	5	30.0	1	2	4.20	5
Lefty Mills	2	12.2	1	1	6.39	10
Bill Miller	1	4.0	0	1	13.50	1
Bob Muncrief	1	2.0	0	0	4.50	0

==== Other pitchers ====
Note: G = Games pitched; IP = Innings pitched; W = Wins; L = Losses; ERA = Earned run average; SO = Strikeouts

Player	G	IP	W	L	ERA	SO
Jack Knott	38	191.1	8	18	4.89	74
Jim Walkup	27	150.1	9	12	7.36	46
Julio Bonetti	28	143.1	4	11	5.84	43
Bill Trotter	34	122.1	2	9	5.81	37
Lou Koupal	26	105.2	4	9	6.56	24
Russ Van Atta	16	58.2	1	2	5.52	34
Earl Caldwell	9	29.0	0	0	6.83	8
Harry Kimberlin	3	15.1	0	2	2.35	5
Emil Bildilli	4	8.0	0	1	10.13	2

==== Relief pitchers ====
Note: G = Games pitched; W = Wins; L = Losses; SV = Saves; ERA = Earned run average; SO = Strikeouts

Player	G	W	L	SV	ERA	SO
Tommy Thomas	17	0	1	0	7.04	10
Sheriff Blake	15	2	2	1	7.61	12
Bill Strickland	9	0	0	0	5.91	6
George Hennessey	5	0	1	0	10.29	4
Nig Lipscomb	3	0	0	0	6.52	1
Ed Baecht	3	0	0	0	12.79	3

== Farm system ==
Level	Team	League	Manager
AA	Toledo Mud Hens	American Association	Fred Haney
A1	San Antonio Missions	Texas League	Zack Taylor
A	Des Moines Demons	Western League	Del Bissonette
B	Meridian Scrappers	Southeastern League	Leonard McNair, Emmett Lipscomb and Harry Whitehouse
B	Terre Haute Tots	Illinois–Indiana–Iowa League	Walter Holke
C	Palestine Pals	East Texas League	Abe Miller
C	Johnstown Johnnies	Middle Atlantic League	Jack Fournier
D	Easton Browns	Eastern Shore League	George Jacobs
D	Lafayette White Sox	Evangeline League	Bobby Goff
D	Mayfield Clothiers	KITTY League	Clarence Mitchell and Walter Holke
D	Fairbury Jeffs	Nebraska State League	Sonny Brookhaus
D	Osceola Indians	Northeast Arkansas League	Elmer Kirchoff
D	Superior Blues	Northern League	George Treadwell
D	Findlay Browns	Ohio State League	Grover Hartley

LEAGUE CHAMPIONS: Mayfield

Terre Haute club folded, July 3, 1937
