= NIG =

NIG or Nig may refer to:

- Israeli Transverse Mercator, commonly known as New Israel Grid
- NIG (insurance company)
- Nig (nickname), various people
- Nig, Iran
- Nig, a canton in Ayrarat, Armenia
- Naigaon railway station (station code: NIG)
- National Institute of Genetics
- Ngalakgan language (ISO 639:nig)
- Niger, IOC country code
- Nigeria, ITU country code
- Nigger (Nig or Nig-nog), a racial slur
- Nik, South Khorasan, romanized as Nig
- Nikunau Airport (IATA: NIG)
- Normal-inverse Gaussian distribution

== See also ==
- Nigg (disambiguation)
