= Meridian White Ribbons =

- 1905–1911; (1905–1913); Meridian, Mississippi

Minor league affiliations
- Class: Class D (1905–1913)
- League: Cotton States League (1905–1913)

Major league affiliations
- Team: None (1905–1913)

Minor league titles
- League titles (0): None

Team data
- Name: Meridian White Ribbons (1905–1911); Merian Metropolitans (1912–1913)
- Ballpark: Meridian Base Ball Park (1905–1913)

The Meridian White Ribbons were a minor league baseball team based in Meridian, Mississippi. From 1905 to 1913, Meridian teams played exclusively as a member of the Class D level Cotton States League. The team was known as the "White Ribbons" or the shortened "Ribboners" until 1912, when it played the first of two seasons as the "Metropolitans."

Meridian teams hosted minor league home games at a parcel called the "Meridian Base Ball Park" in the era.

== History ==
=== 1893: First Meridian team ===
Meridian first hosted minor league baseball in 1893, when the Meridian "Bluebirds" played the season as members of the independent Mississippi State League. No official records were known for the league in 1893. The Mississippi League folded after the 1894 season without a Meridian team. Meridian did not host a minor league team for another 21 seasons.

George Blackburn was a pitcher for the first Meridian team in 1893. On July 16, 1897, Cap Anson of the Chicago Cubs became the first player in major league history to record 3,000 total hits when he singled off Blackburn, pitching for the Baltimore Orioles.

=== 1905 to 1911: Cotton States League ===
After a 21-season hiatus, minor league baseball resumed in Meridian when the 1905 Meridian "White Ribbons" were formed and became members of the Class D Cotton States League. In 1905, the league expanded from a six-team league to an eight-team league, adding the Hattiesburg and Meridian franchises as expansion teams. Meridian joined the Baton Rouge Cajuns, Greenville Cotton Pickers, Hattiesburg Tar Heels, Jackson Senators, Natchez Indians, Pine Bluff Lumbermen and Vicksburg Hill Climbers teams in beginning Cotton State League play on April 20, 1905.

The Meridian "White Ribbons" nickname corresponds with regional recreation and fishing in the era. The White Ribbon Trout, were prevalent in the region in the era and this continues today.

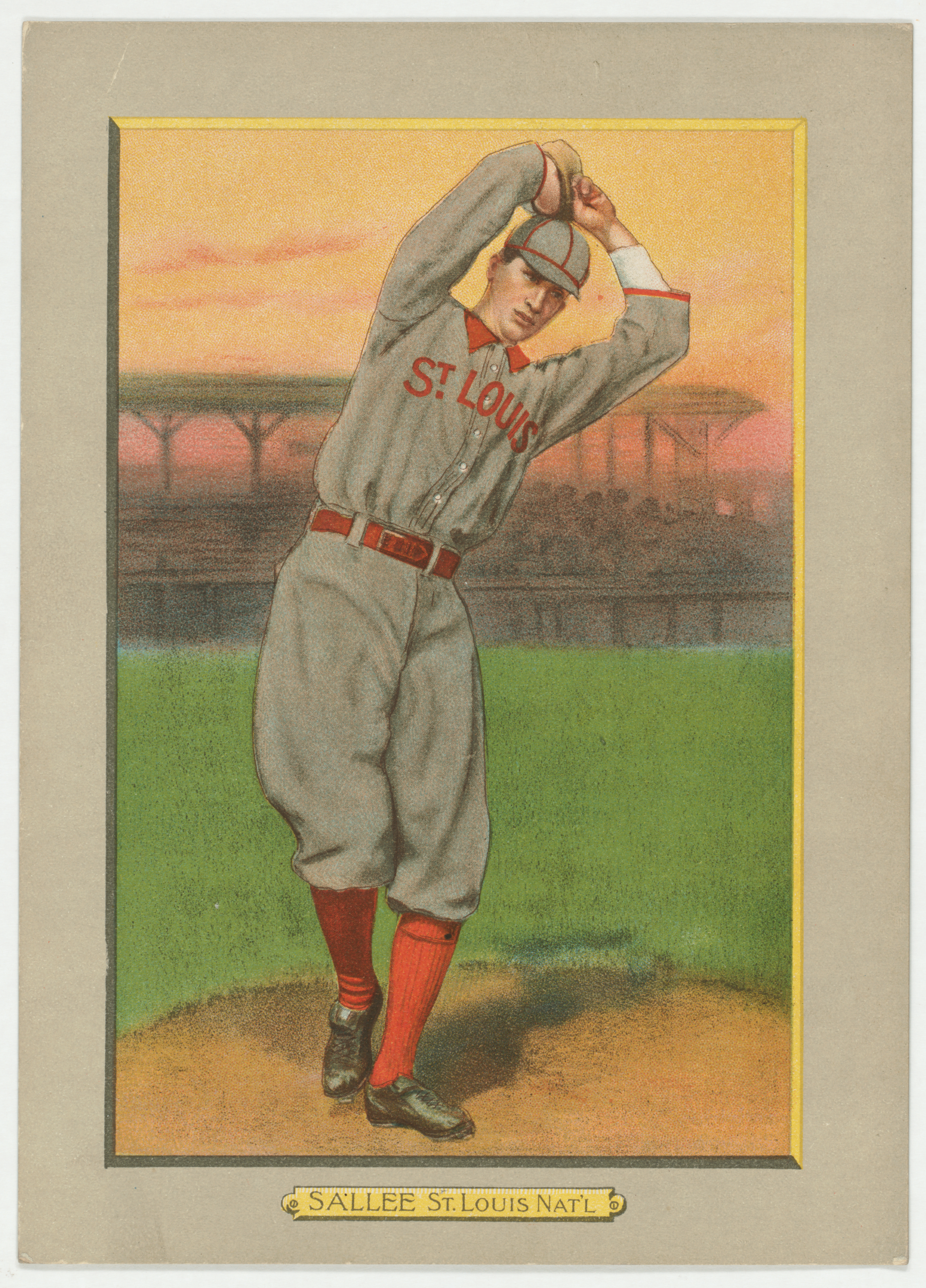
(1911) Slim Sallee, St. Louis Cardinals, baseball card. Sallee had a 10–4 record for Meridian in 1905, leading the Cotton States League in wins.

The 1905 Cotton States League season was interrupted by an epidemic. Due to the Yellow Fever epidemic, the eight–team Cotton States League stopped play on July 31, 1905, with the approval of the National Association, which governed minor league teams and leagues in the era. When the league folded, Meridian White Ribbons had compiled a record of 49–35, which placed them second in the league final standings. In the final standings during the shortened season, the White Ribbons finished 5.5 games behind first place Greenville Cotton Pickers. The Meridian manager in their first Cotton State League season was Tom Stouch. In the shortened season, Meridian pitcher Slim Sallee led the Cotton States League with 10 wins while sporting a 10–4 record.

The 1905 White Ribbons' manager Tom Stouch came to Meridian after managing his 1904 Decatur team to the championship of the Tennessee-Alabama League, which folded after the season. Stouch did not return to manage Meridian in 1906. In 1907, Stouch became the manager of the Greenville Mountaineers of the South Carolina League. While managing for the Mountaineers, Stouch discovered Shoeless Joe Jackson while Jackson was playing semi-professional baseball for a textile mill team in Greenville. In 1908, Stouch signed Jackson to his first professional contract, and he began his professional career playing for Stouch with the Greenville Mountaineers.

After the epidemic of 1905, the Cotton States League and Meridian resumed play in 1906 and the White Ribbons again ended the season in second place in the six-team league. The White Ribbons were managed by player/manager Guy Sample. Meridian ended the season with a final record of 65–54, to place second in the Cotton States League final standings. The White Ribbons ended the season 9.5 games behind the first place Mobile Sea Gulls, as no playoffs were held. Curt Gardner of Meridian led the Cotton States League with 137 total hits.

When the Cotton States League season ended on September 4, 1906, Mobile and Meridian were the two Cotton States League teams that reportedly cleared a profit. The other league teams besides the Baton Rouge Cajuns broke even financially.

Cowboy Jones played for the 1906 Meridian White Ribbons at age 31. Jones had previously pitched in the major leagues from 1899 to 1902. A native of Golden, Colorado, Jones became the first Colorado native to play in the major leagues. He started his professional career after pitching in college at the Colorado School of Mines in Golden and Jones later became the mayor of Golden, Colorado and served six terms.

The 1907 Meridian White Ribbons placed fifth in the Cotton States League, which remained a Class D level league when reduced to six teams. Meridian finished with a record of 64–70, playing the season under returning player/manager Guy Sample. The White Ribbons ended the season 18.0 games behind the first place Mobile Sea Gulls in the final standings as the league held no playoffs.

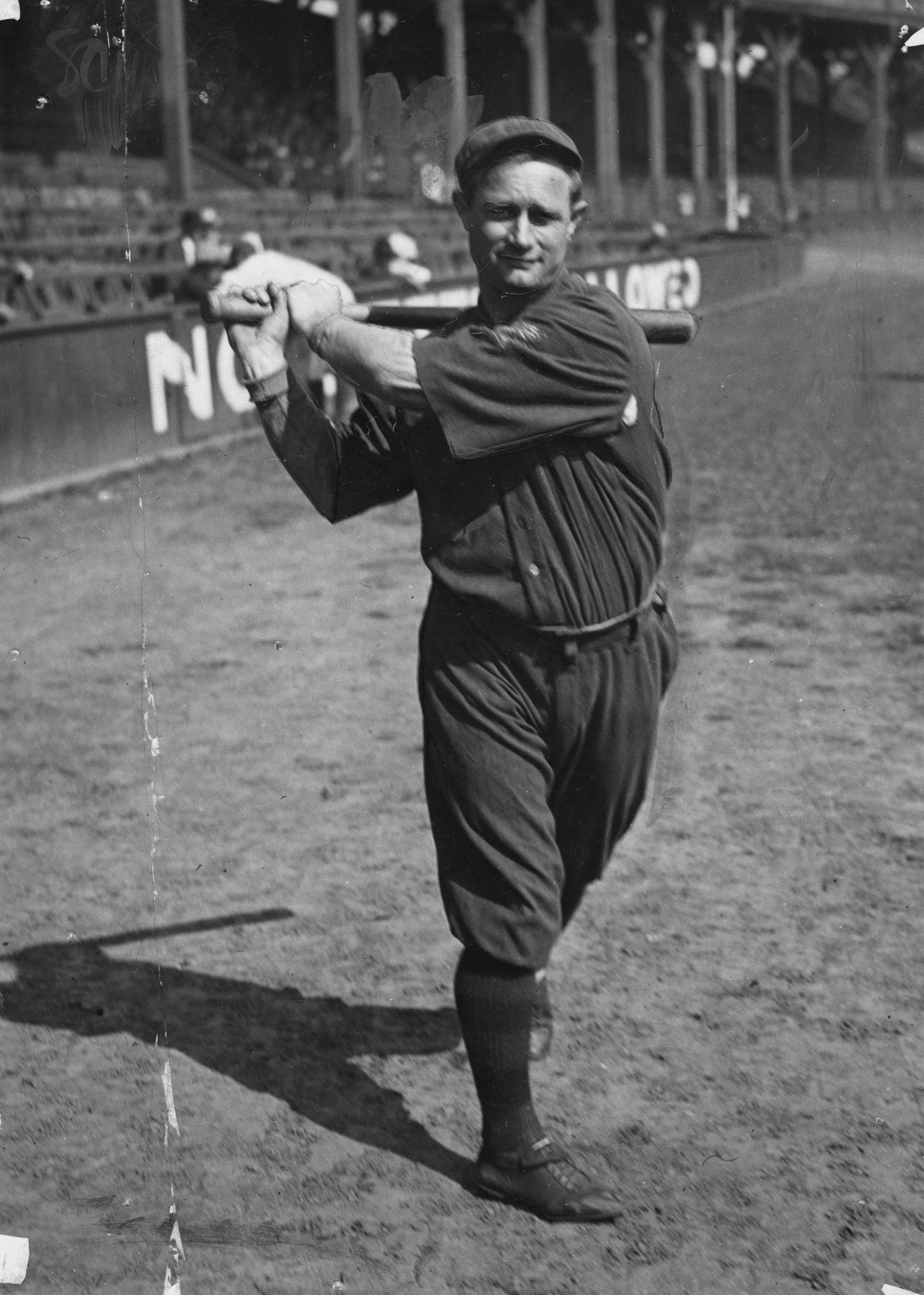
(1914) Josh Devore, World Series champion Boston Braves. Devore played for Meridian in 1906 and 1907 in his first professional seasons.

Josh Devore played for Meridian in the 1906 and 1907 seasons. At age 17, Devore was living in Seelyville, Indiana, working in his older brother William's grocery store and playing semipro baseball. His brother saw an advertisement in the newspaper that Meridian was seeking a left-handed-hitting outfielder for their minor league team. With Devore playing at 5-feet-6 and 160 pounds, Meridian manager Guy Sample agreed to give him a chance to make the team after his brother William put up a $100 guarantee that his brother would make the team.

After making the team, Devore hit .242 during his first professional season in 1906 and earned the nickname "the Seelyville Speed Demon" due to his speed on the bases. Devore had 33 stolen bases in his first season. In 1907, Devore compiles similar statistics for Meridian, hitting .241 with 35 stolen bases. The New York Globe newspaper reported that Devore's power and speed caught the attention of a scout for the New York Giants. The newspaper wrote that the carpenters union in Meridian was upset about Devore's departure, since they would lose the extra revenue that they earned from making repairs on the wooden outfield fence, as it took many collisions from Devore.

The New York Giants purchased Devore from Meridian for $750. After the transaction, the Meridian club president Allan Canto wrote to the National Commission complaining that the Giants hadn't fulfilled the terms of the purchase agreement, and that Meridian wanted Devore returned to them. Despite the dispute, Devore remained the property of the Giants and won two National League pennants while playing with New York.

Continuing Cotton States League play in 1908, the Meridian White Ribbons ended the season with a record of 46–68. They placed fifth in the six-team Cotton States League final standings, managed during the season by Charles Nig Fuller and Jack Hankey. Meridian ended the season 24.0 games behind the first place Jackson Senators in the final standings.

In his final professional season at age 31, Frank Bates pitched for Meridian in 1908. Bates had last pitched in the major leagues for the 1899 1899 Cleveland Spiders, where he lost his final 14 decisions of the season. With Bates on the roster, the 1899 Cleveland Spiders had a final season record of 20–134 (.130), the worst record in MLB history.

A football standout at the University of Minnesota, George Capron played for Meridian in 1908. In 1907, the Minnesota football team scored 55 points the entire season and "Capron accounted for 44 of them." As a kicker, Capron utilized dropkicked field goals, which were worth four points each in the era. Capron was selected as a third-team All-American by Walter Camp at the end of the 1907 season.

Due to amateur rules of the era, Capron became involved in a controversy over his eligibility when reports surfaced that he had played professional baseball under a false name while a student/athlete at the University of Minnesota. Capron later admitted that he played baseball under the name "Robb" while playing for Meridian in 1908 and also during the previous season with the Mattoon Giants team of the Eastern Illinois League'. From 1909 to 1910, Capron played continued his professional baseball, play with teams in the Northwestern League. Capron also played professional football in the early era of pro game during 1910s.

The Cotton States League folded for one year after completing the 1908 season and did not play in 1909. The league returned to play in 1910 after a one-season lapse.

After its one-season hiatus, the Class D Cotton States League returned to play in 1910, reforming as a Class D level, six-team league. Meridian joined the Greenwood Scouts, Hattiesburg Timberjacks, Jackson Tigers, Vicksburg Hill Billies and Yazoo City Zoos teams in resuming Cotton States League play on May 2, 1910.

The Meridian White Ribbons ended their 1910 season in last place in the Cotton States League final standings. With a record of 45–67, playing the season under manager Bernie McCray, Meridian ended the season in sixth place in the six-team league. In the final standings, Meridian finished 28.5 games behind the first place Greenwood Chauffeurs in the final standings. No league playoffs were held.

The 1911 Meridian White Ribbons finished in last place in the Cotton States League final standings for the second consecutive season. With a regular season Cotton States League record of 46–73, the White Ribbons placed six in the six-team Class D level Cotton States League, which had no playoffs. The 1911 Meridian manager was Forrest Plass and Meridian ended the season 29.0 games behind the first place Vicksburg Hill Billies.

After leaving Meridian, 1911 player/manager Forrest Plass became the proprietor of the Plass Toggery Shop, located at 233 Main Street in Dubuque, Iowa. Plass also became the manager and part owner of the Dubuque Dubs of the Three-I League through 1914. He then retired as a player and became an umpire. The Dubuque business founded by Plass is still in operation today, having become known as Gordon's Toggery Shop in 1952.

=== 1912 & 1913: Cotton States League ===
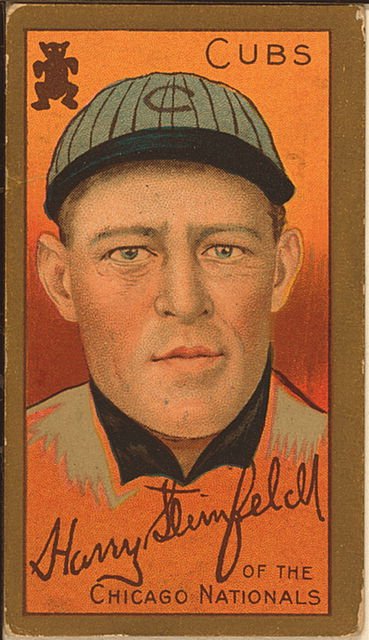
(1911) Harry Steinfeldt, Chicago Cubs. baseball card. Steinfeldt managed Meridian in 1912.

The Meridian team became known as the Meridian "Metropolitans" in 1912, continuing play in the six-team Class D level Cotton States League. On August 3, 1912, Meridian folded from the league while the team was in second place in the league standings with a record of 52–46. Shortly after, Vicksburg was in first place with a record of 66–42, when that franchise disbanded on August 13, 1912. Two other teams in the six–team league had disbanded earlier. The managers of the Metropolitans in the shortened season were Orth Collins, Harry Steinfeldt and Bob Kennedy. The Cotton States League played with three teams until folding for the season on August 28, 1912. Meridian pitcher Walter Hirsch had a perfect 12–0 record to lead the Cotton States League in its unsettled season.

Harry Steinfeldt served as a player/manager the Meridian Metropolitans for part of the 1912 season after playing his final major league season in 1911. He won two world series as the third basemen for the Chicago Cubs. To begin the 1912 season, Steinfeldt briefly managed the Cincinnati Pippins of the United States Baseball League, which folded midseason. He then played for the Louisville Colonels of the American Association, until his release in May. On June 21, 1912, Steinfeldt became the manager of the Meriden Metropolitans. Following his managerial tenure with Meridian, Steinfeldt became ill and bedridden. On August 17, 1914, Harry Steinfeldt died at the age of 37. Steinfeldt died from a cerebral hemorrhage.

Despite folding the season before, the 1913 Meridian Metropolitans resumed play as a member of the Cotton States League play. For the second consecutive season, the Metropolitans ended the season in sixth place in the six-team Class D level league. With a 22–75 final record, Meridian ended the season 48.5 games behind the first place Jackson Senators in the final league standings, as no playoffs were held. Meridian played the season under managers Carlos Smith and Walt Hirsch. Meridian player/manager Carlos Smith captured the Cotton States League batting title, hitting .361 on the season.

After the conclusion of the 1913 season, the Cotton States League folded due to onset of World War I, which affected many minor leagues.

Meridian remained without a minor league baseball franchise until 1921, when Meridian team resumed play under the shortened "Metropolitans" nickname. The 1921 Meridian Mets began play as members of the Class D level Mississippi State League. The Mets continued play in the reformed Cotton States League in 1922, beginning another tenure of Meridian in the league.

== The ballpark ==
From 1905 to 1913, the Meridian minor league teams hosted home games at the "Meridian Baseball Park." In the era, the ballpark was located on 29th avenue, bordered by 6th Street, Davis Street and railroad tracks. The location corresponds with the parcel containing today's Oakland Park. Oakland Park is located at 2729 6th Street in Meridian, Mississippi

== Timeline ==
Year(s)	# Yrs.	Team	Level	League	Ballpark
1905–1911	6	Meridian White Ribbons	Class D	Cotton States League	Meridian Base Ball Park
1912–1913	2	Meridian Metropolitans	Class D	Cotton States League	Meridian Base Ball Park

== Year–by–year records ==
Year	Record	Finish	Manager	Playoffs/Notes
1905	49–35	2nd	Tom Stouch	League stopped play July 31
1906	65–54	2nd	Guy Sample	No playoffs held
1907	64–70	5th	Guy Sample	No playoffs held
1908	46–68	5th	Charles Nig Fuller / Jack Hankey	No playoffs held
1909	NA	NA	NA	Cotton States League did not play.
1910	45–67	6th	Bernie McCay	No playoffs held
1911	46–73	6th	Forrest Plass	No playoffs held
1912	52–46	NA	Orth Collins / Harry Steinfeldt; Bob Kennedy	Team folded August 3
1913	22–75	6th	Carlos Smith / Walt Hirsch	No playoffs held

== Notable alumni ==
- Scotty Alcock (1906)
- Frank Bates (1908)
- Harry Billiard (1906–1908)
- George Blackburn (1893)
- George Capron (1908)
- Danny Clark (1912)
- Orth Collins (1912, MGR)
- Rube Dessau (1905)
- Josh Devore (1906–1907)
- Klondike Douglass (1911)
- Nig Fuller (1908, MGR)
- Frank Genins (1905)
- Cowboy Jones (1906)
- Joe Kutina (1908)
- Pryor McElveen (1905)
- Allie Moulton (1908)
- Tom Parrott (1905)
- Heinie Reitz (1908)
- Slim Sallee (1905)
- Charlie Shields (1910)
- Harry Steinfeldt (1912, MGR)
- Ace Stewart (1907)
- Tom Stouch (1905, MGR)
- Harry Truby (1905)
- Irv Waldron (1911)
- Jimmy Walsh (1908)
- Ollie Welf (1911, 1913)
- Ducky Yount (1907–1908)

== See also ==
- Meridian White Ribbons players
- Meridian Metropolitans players
