= Hynos =

Vietnamese toothpaste brand

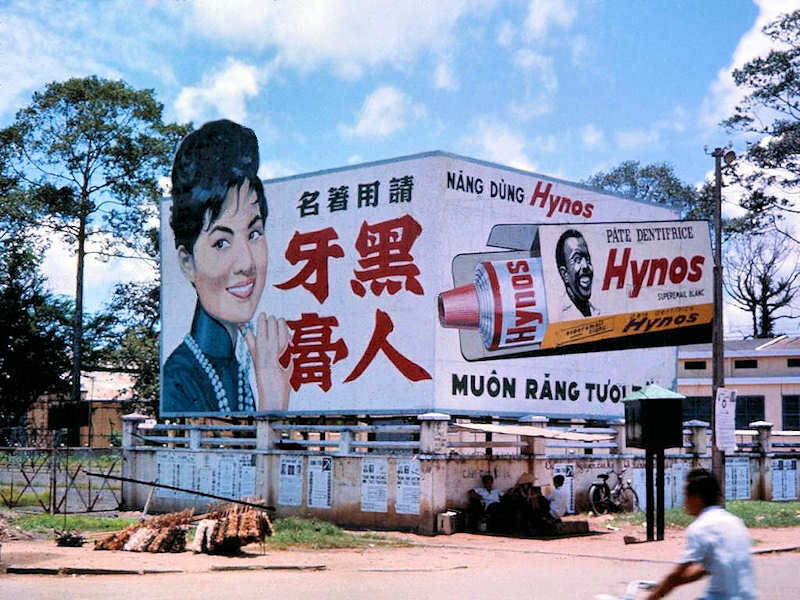
- Product type: Toothpaste
- Country: South Vietnam

Hynos is a Vietnamese toothpaste brand. The brand was originally sold in South Vietnam, Cambodia, Laos, Thailand, Singapore and Hong Kong, and still exists today. Hynos was known for its innovative advertising techniques, which included the use of billboards, film, and jingles.

The brand is known for being featured in several billboards, the most prominent of which show an African man grinning widely with shiny white teeth (similar to the Darlie Toothpaste logo). A scene involving one of its factories in the 1987 film, Full Metal Jacket, where fighting between US Marines and the Viet Cong breaks out in the South Vietnamese city of Huế.

== History ==
Hynos was founded in the 1960s by a Jewish-American businessman in South Vietnam. He was married to a Vietnamese woman, but her premature death caused him to lose interest in the business. The company was sold to a Vietnamese man named Vuong Dao Nghia at a very low price. Vuong decided to focus on making the brand competitive with both domestic and imported toothpaste brands through advertising, choosing the image of a black man with white teeth to represent the Hynos brand. Billboards featuring the man soon became a common sight on the streets of Saigon. The company was also one of the first in Vietnam to advertise through film, hiring Hong Kong actor Jimmy Wang Yu to create a commercial that was screened in theatres. It was reported that Hynos spent 50% of its profits on advertising. Within ten years, the company had a monopoly in the domestic market and was also influential in neighbouring Southeast Asian countries. After the Fall of Saigon in April 1975, the company merged with Kolperlon, another local toothpaste company, to became Orchid Toothpaste Factory. Orchid became Vietnam's first state-owned enterprise on May 30, 1975. At the time, the company produced 80 000 tubes of toothpaste per day, using locally sourced calcium carbonate. The company soon discovered 2 million tubes of imported P/S toothpaste in its warehouses, and thus decided to rebrand itself as P/S. By the mid-1990s, P/S had a 60% market share of the toothpaste industry in Vietnam, but began to drop off following economic reforms that allowed foreign investors and goods into Vietnam. In 1997, P/S entered a joint venture with Unilever, with the latter becoming responsible for manufacturing toothpaste.

The Hynos brand was reintroduced in 2007, but failed to achieve its former popularity.
