= Nigger Head =

Island in Queensland, Australia; no current name

Coordinates: 11°47′49″S 142°56′13″E

Nigger Head is the former name of a small island in the northern part of Shelburne Bay in far north Queensland, Australia about 30 km north of Cape Grenville, Cape York Peninsula in the Great Barrier Reef Marine Park Queensland, Australia. It was named so because it is an isolated coral outcrop; such outcrops were known as niggerheads by British sailors.

In 2017, the Department of Natural Resources and Mines which is responsible for naming places in Queensland, said that the name "Nigger Head" would no longer be used. The Queensland government said that a new name would be chosen for the island, although a new name was never selected and the island remains officially unnamed.

== See also ==
- Bird Islands (Queensland)
- List of islands of Australia
- Use of nigger in proper names
