= Rick Perry 2012 presidential campaign =

American political campaign

Rick Perry for President 2012
- Campaign: Republican primaries U.S. presidential election, 2012
- Candidate: Rick Perry; 47th governor of Texas (2000–2015)
- Affiliation: Republican Party
- Headquarters: Houston, Texas
- Key people: Rob Johnson (manager); Joe Allbaugh, David Carney (advisors); Wayne Hamilton (political director); Ray Sullivan (communications director); Nelson Warfield (spokesman); Curt Anderson (media consultant); Deirdre Delisi (policy and strategy director); Tony Fabrizo, Mike Baselice (pollsters); Margaret Lauderback (director of finance)
- Receipts: US$20,588,252 (2012-06-30)

Website
- Rick Perry for President (archived - Jan, 17, 2012)

The Rick Perry presidential campaign of 2012 began when Rick Perry, four-term Governor of Texas, announced via a spokesman on August 11, 2011, that he would be running for the 2012 Republican Party nomination for president of the United States.

Perry was considered as a potential candidate since as early as the 2008 presidential election, initially denying he was interested in the office but later becoming more open-minded. He formally launched his campaign on August 13, 2011, in Charleston, South Carolina. While he was initially successful in fundraising and was largely considered a serious contender for the nomination, he struggled during the debates and his poll numbers began to decline. After finishing fifth with just over 10% of the vote in the Iowa caucuses on January 3, 2012, Perry considered dropping out of the presidential race but did not. After a poor showing in New Hampshire and with "lagging" poll numbers in South Carolina, Perry formally announced he was suspending his campaign on January 19, 2012.

== Draft efforts ==
Perry had persistently denied aspirations to higher office; he was originally included on the 2012 Presidential Straw Poll ballot at the Values Voter Summit in September 2009, but his name was removed at his own request. In April 2008 while appearing as a guest on CNBC's Kudlow & Company, he specifically stated that he would not agree to serve as vice president in a McCain administration, stating that he already had "the best job in the world" as governor of Texas.

Further, during a Republican gubernatorial debate in January 2010, when asked if he would commit to serving out his term if re-elected, he replied that "the place hasn't been made yet" where he would rather serve than the governor of Texas. In December 2010, when asked if he was a "definite maybe" to run for president in 2012, he replied, "a definite no, brother".

On May 27, 2011, he said he was "going to think about" running for the 2012 Republican presidential nomination after the close of the Texas legislative session. Perry said in a response to a question from a reporter, "but I think about a lot of things," he added with a grin. Republican donors persistently asked Perry to run for office, and the efforts to draft Perry intensified in July and August 2011 until he decided to run. It was later reported by the Associated Press that Perry had called many of his warm contacts and done aggressive networking throughout 2011, and used Texas state phones to do so. The use of government phones for election and campaign activity is considered an ethical violation of an elected office. The Associated Press noted that its investigation was incomplete because the Perry administration had "censored dozens of calls [from the records] for privacy reasons, and his schedules in recent years contain only partial information". A spokesman for the Governor's office insisted that the calls were all official government business.

== Campaign developments ==
=== Beginning ===
On August 11, 2011, a Perry spokesman said that he would be running for president, with plans to announce his formal entry into the race two days later. Perry himself confirmed it on a visit to KVUE, the ABC affiliate in Austin, the state capital. As the Associated Press bulletin announcing his entry into the race came across the wire, Perry signed and dated a printed copy of the bulletin.

On August 13, 2011, in a speech at Charleston, South Carolina, Perry officially announced that he would be a candidate for the Republican nomination. He later stated that it was his wife, Anita, who encouraged him to run for president, as he was happy being governor of Texas.

Perry said Federal Reserve Chairman Ben Bernanke should stop printing more money to stimulate the economy, saying it was "treasonous" and that he would be treated "pretty ugly down in Texas" for his actions. He also criticized Barack Obama for not serving in the military, saying, "The president had the opportunity to serve his country. I'm sure at some time he made the decision that isn't what he wanted to do."

On August 17, 2011, at a breakfast with business leaders in New Hampshire Perry said that he does not believe the science behind global warming. He said "there are a substantial number of scientists who have manipulated data so that they will have dollars rolling into their projects."

=== Make Us Great Again Super PAC ===
Because of Perry's comparatively late entry into the race, he was behind other candidates in fundraising and was under pressure to raise money quickly. Questions were raised about his fundraising methods. For one, his campaign was supported by a super PAC called "Make Us Great Again". A super PAC is allowed to raise unlimited funds from individuals and even from corporations, which cannot contribute to federal candidates, but the super PAC is required to be completely independent from the campaign.

Make Us Great Again was created and headed by Mike Toomey, who had been Perry's chief of staff. This arrangement was criticized as illegal by Fred Wertheimer, the president of the watchdog group Democracy 21, who said, "The idea that such a PAC is going to be independent from the campaign is ridiculous." Perry's former legislative director, Dan Shelley, is also running a pro-Perry super PAC. Perry's longstanding feud with Karl Rove may be another factor in his Super PAC fundraising, as Rove is a key advisor to many major Republican donors.

Perry took the fundraising lead in his first reporting period. The biggest source of his donations was from employees of George Brint Ryan's tax and accounting firm. As of January 16, 2012, the PAC had spent $3.96 million on promoting Perry's campaign.

=== September 2011: Early struggles in debates ===
Perry's performances in the GOP debates received generally poor reviews from the media. His botched attempt to criticize Mitt Romney as a flip-flopper in a debate held in Orlando, Florida was described as a "spectacular failure." His speech was so garbled that Mark Hemingway of the Weekly Standard asked if Perry had suffered a stroke, and Brit Hume of Fox News stated that Perry, "at a time when he needed to raise his game, I mean, he did worse, it seems to me, than he had done in previous debates." However, Paul Burka, senior executive editor at Texas Monthly, said "Eventually the debates will end, and retail politics will take center stage. I think Perry will have an advantage in that format because he is better at the meet-and-greet and connecting with people than Mitt Romney is."

Perry lost many conservatives' support when he defended the Texas policy of allowing in-state tuition for the children of illegal immigrants. He said during one debate that those who opposed financially supporting their education didn't "have a heart." He was later forced to spend much of his time on the campaign trail defending the law, saying it was compassionate conservatism, was a state-only issue, and was well-intentioned because it would turn those citizens into productive, taxpaying members of society.

After he mishandled a question about how he would respond to a "3am call" as president, Perry's advisers insisted that he get more sleep before the remaining debates. However, Alex Castellanos said of his next performance, at Dartmouth College, that the next time he should bring a mattress. Perry admitted after the event that "Debates are not my strong suit." Perry's performance in the Las Vegas debate was better received, at least in comparison to the other GOP hopefuls.

Perry finished in second place in the 2011 California, Florida, Michigan and National Federation of Republican Women's Convention straw polls. He later placed fourth in the Values Voter Summit straw poll and then fifth in the Midwest Leadership Conference and South Carolina tea party straw polls.

He continued at around fifth place until he dropped out of the race.

=== October 2011: Facing difficulties ===
October 2011 was a poor month for his campaign, as his debate performances, scrutiny from conservatives, negative media attention, and the rise of Herman Cain's popularity caused his viability to sink. His wife, Anita Perry, reflected on the "rough month", saying he was being "brutalized" by his opponents for his Christian faith.

In October 2011, the Washington Post reported that Perry's family leases a hunting camp once called "Niggerhead". According to some local residents interviewed by the Post, the Perrys used the camp for years before painting over a large rock with that name on it, which stands at an entrance to the area, and during this time Perry hosted friends and supporters at the camp. Perry was criticized as being "insensitive" by Republican primary rival Herman Cain. Perry's campaign disputed the claims made by Cain and the Post, stating that the Perrys painted over the rock almost immediately after acquiring a lease on the property in 1983.

Following the controversy, Perry's record on racial issues was scrutinized. The suggestion was made that allowing the use of the Confederate flag amounted to racism. He was criticised for having defended a display of Confederate symbols and having allegedly run "race-baiting" ads during his 1990 campaign against liberal activist and Democrat Jim Hightower for Texas agriculture commissioner. The ads pictured Hightower next to Jesse Jackson while a voice-over asks "Does Agriculture Commissioner Jim Hightower share your values?"

The ads were criticized for their racial content by leaders in Texas's congressional black caucus, fellow members with Hightower of the Democratic Party. However, several black Texas Democrats, such as former state Senator Ron Wilson and current Senator Royce West, defended Perry against accusations of racism, with Wilson saying, "He doesn't have a racist bone in his body. He didn't then, and he doesn't now." and West pointing to "many things he has done that were sensitive to ethnic minorities".

Perry's links to the New Apostolic Reformation and its founder C. Peter Wagner, who helped organize Perry's prayer rally The Response, also received scrutiny by enemies of Perry. Perry has said he does not necessarily endorse the views of Wagner, who has advocated publicly burning religious images and claimed that Japan is controlled by demons because its emperor had sex with the sun goddess.

=== Media campaign and recovery attempts ===
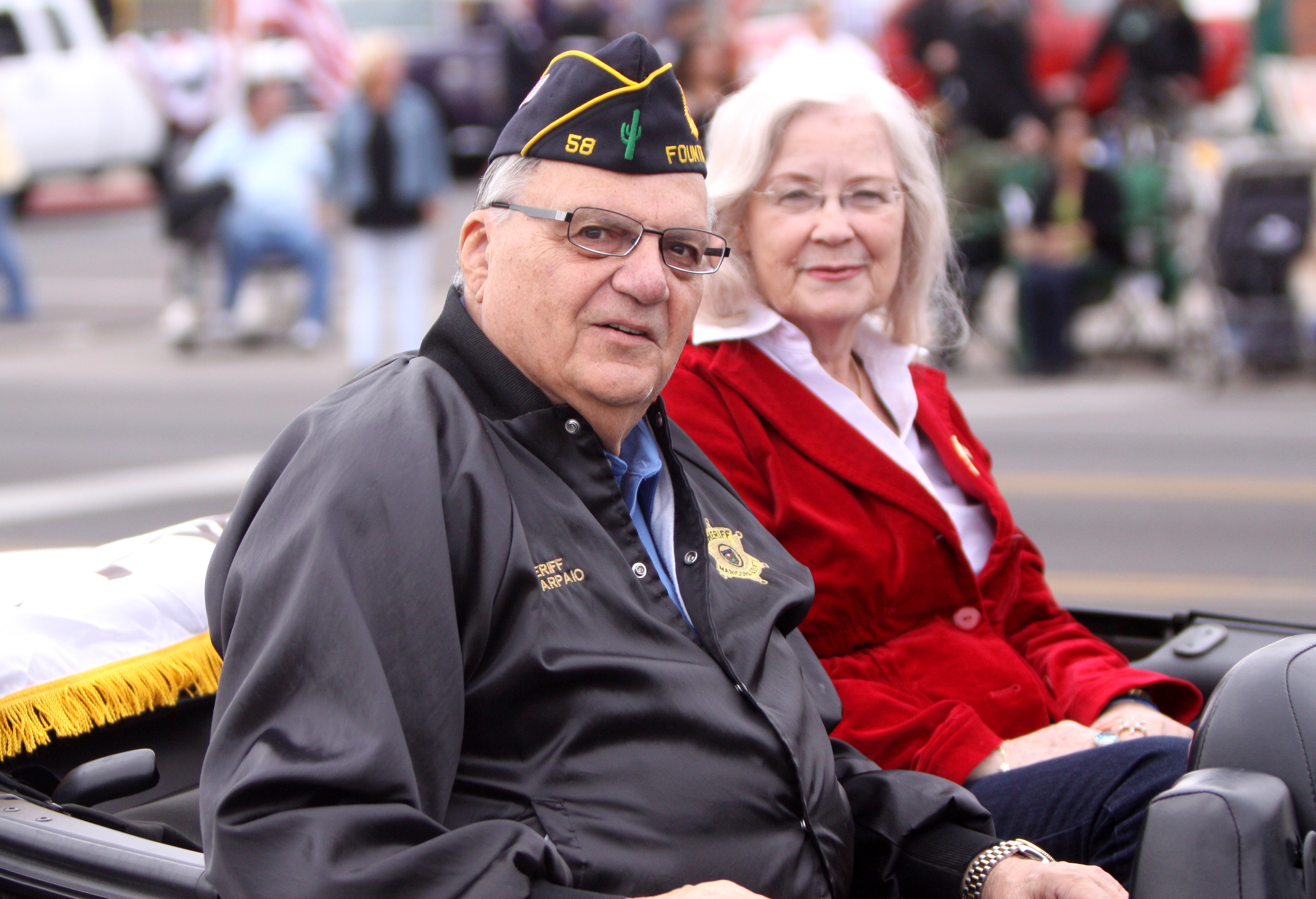
Perry won the endorsement of Sheriff Joe Arpaio, known nationally for his opposition to illegal immigration. The two campaigned together beginning in November 2011.

Perry's campaign, which announced that it had raised $17 million in early October, was well-positioned to endure a long and costly campaign against Mitt Romney. His campaign invested hundreds of thousands of dollars in television and radio advertisements in early states, and was able to finance serious ground operations. The commercials were positive and focused on his tax plan, energy initiatives, and jobs record as Texas governor.

Perry put forward a flat tax proposal that would allow taxpayers to choose either their tax rate under existing law or a flat 20% rate. The plan would also eliminate taxes on Social Security benefits and inheritances. Asked if his tax plan would help wealthy taxpayers, Perry said he was not concerned about that because a lower tax rate would encourage greater investment and job creation by the wealthy. His tax plan was promoted as being so simple and easy that a taxpayer could calculate it on the back of an index card.

Perry hired several high-profile Republican media advisers on October 24, 2011, and began launching more negative television ads against Mitt Romney. Perry's new media team was described as aggressive by Politico, which noted that many had worked for Governor Rick Scott's 2010 campaign in Florida which it described as using "brass-knuckled tactics". One political analyst predicted that "Perry won't just go negative. He'll make your television bleed and beg for mercy".

Perry joked freely during a speech he delivered at an annual banquet in New Hampshire. When clips of it went viral on the Internet, there were negative interpretations. Politico offered the idea that the way the video was cut suggested he was under the influence of alcohol or medicine, something Perry later denied. New Hampshire Republican officials defended Perry, saying the speech was well received by the audience.

=== November 2011: "Oops" moment and continued struggles ===
At the November 9, 2011, Republican debate, Perry began a fiery statement about his platform, pledging to eliminate three government agencies as part of his policy to cut federal spending, but after naming the Departments of Education and Commerce, was unable to remember the name of the third agency, eventually declaring "I can't. The third one, I can't. Sorry. Oops." A few minutes later, Perry said that the agency he had been trying to think of to eliminate was the Department of Energy (he would later become the Secretary of Energy under the Trump administration). The Guardian called it "one of the most humiliating debate performances in recent US political history", and reporters asked him if he was going to continue in the race after that gaffe. "Oh, my God, it was just horrible. Just horrible", said Mark Greenfield, Hamilton County, Iowa GOP chairman and a key supporter of Perry, who expected that the incident likely ended Perry's campaign.

Perry joked off the incident. Observers have speculated that he may have had a natural "retrieval failure" as a result of stress put on him by past poor debates and personal pressure to shine at the event. In a later debate, he called for the United States to start foreign aid at zero and require each country to justify and be accountable for the aid it receives. During the debate, he was immediately asked how he would address Israel's foreign aid, which is over $30 billion. He reassured the commentators that Israel was a "special ally" for the United States and would receive "significant" aid.

In an ad released in November 2011, Perry slammed President Barack Obama for saying, "We've been a little bit lazy I think over the last couple of decades." While many Republicans joined Perry in condemning the remarks, the ad was criticized as misleading by some in the media. Perry went on to say that the "lazy" remark suggested that Obama "grew up in a privileged way".

In the same week, he challenged House Minority Leader Nancy Pelosi to a debate about overhauling Congress. Perry argued for the U.S. Congress to halve its members' salaries and create a shorter, more part-time, schedule so Congressmen would have to "go back home, have a real job, and live under the laws that they pass in Washington, DC." Pelosi declined and mocked Perry's November 9 debate performance. The San Francisco Chronicle printed a story on November 17 citing a sharp downturn in fundraising for the Perry campaign, which was attributed to gaffe-marred debates.

=== Appeals to Christian voters ===
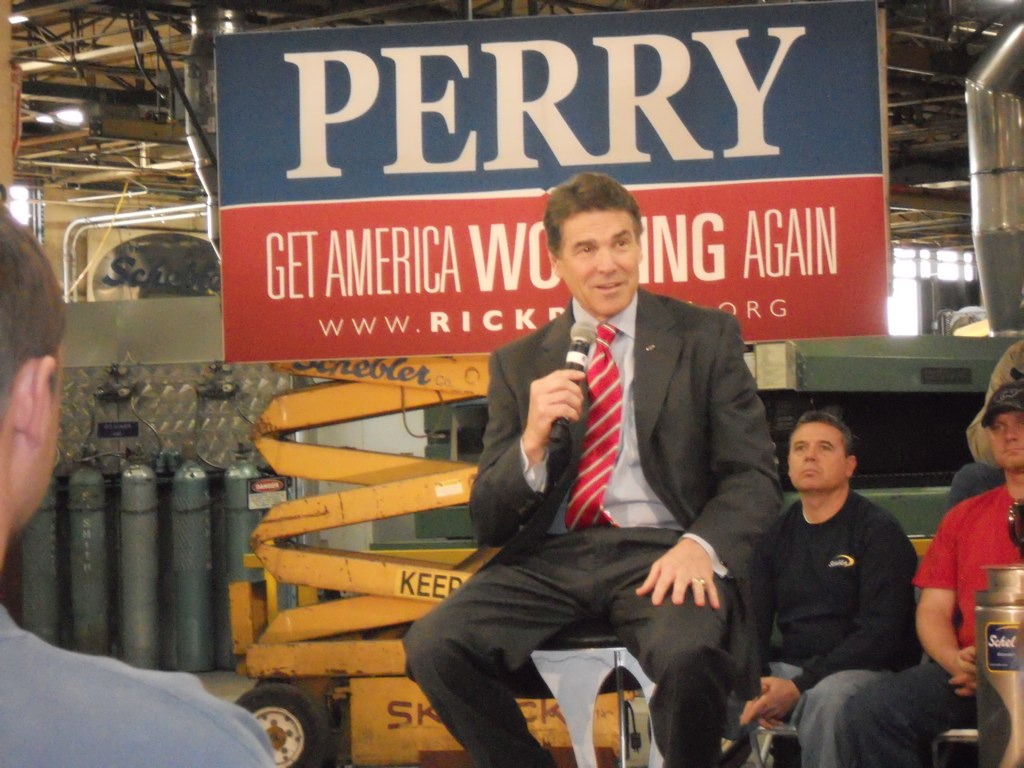
Rick Perry at a campaign stump in December 2011

Perry became more outspoken about his Christian faith and his opposition to gay-related issues beginning in December 2011. Following the exit of Herman Cain, he told potential voters that, like Cain, he did not support the repeal of "don't ask don't tell".

==== "Strong" advertisement ====
He launched advertising in Iowa featuring his faith and the challenge to it from liberal and secular movements. His campaign aired a television ad in December 2011 titled "Strong", the second such ad with the first title "Faith" having been released the previous week.

In the ad, called "Strong", Perry reiterated his opposition to the repeal of "don't ask, don't tell", stating "something's wrong in this country when gays can openly serve in the military, but our children can't openly celebrate Christmas or pray in school", and promised to end Obama's "war on religion." The ad garnered 400,000 "dislikes" after three days, becoming one of the most disliked videos on YouTube and inspiring several parodies. It also created internal dissent among his campaign staff.

The "edgy and viscerally anti-gay" script was proposed by Nelson Warfield, Perry's campaign spokesman who had previously worked on the Bob Dole 1996 presidential campaign. It was intended to be "big and dramatic" in order to "cut through the clutter" of the campaign. On November 21, 2011, highly positive polls of Republican voters were reported internally in the campaign on the ad's language.

"Strong" raised controversy for addressing gay people in the military and religion in public schools, largely due to Perry's disapproval of the former. Time magazine noted that "While [Perry]'s not the first Republican nominee to promote religion as a campaign platform, he just might be the most provocative", as the ad "wastes no time in pushing two of the hottest political buttons in the county". Perry was heckled during a campaign stop after the ad's release, accused of having an anti-gay bias. The Human Rights Campaign criticized the ad, with a director stating "We cannot be in the business of forcing people to choose between who they are, who they love, and their faith. Rick Perry's rhetoric presumes that you can't be Christian and supportive of LGBT people".

==== Other efforts ====
Perry criticized the Obama administration's announcement on December 6, 2011, that the United States would initiate the use of foreign aid for promoting homosexual rights across the world. Perry spoke out against the measure, saying, "Just when you thought Barack Obama couldn't get any more out of touch with America's values, AP reports his administration wants to make foreign aid decisions based on gay rights. This administration's war on traditional American values must stop." During his speech, Perry called homosexuality a "deeply objectionable" lifestyle and firmly objected to any effort by the Obama administration to encroach on traditional family values.

In an apparent reference to the non-renewal of a grant for a Catholic organization, the U.S. Bishops Council on Migratory and Refugee Services, Perry said the administration's decision to reduce federal funding was an example of Obama's "war on religion". Time magazine argued that Perry's criticisms against Obama were overblown, as Catholic organizations had received $1.5 billion in federal grant monies in the last two years of Obama's administration.

Perry gave an interview to the Des Moines Register editorial board arguing against the Supreme Court decisions to end prayer in schools. He said the rulings were made by "eight unelected and, frankly, unaccountable judges" and called the Supreme Court Justice Sonia Sotomayor "Montemayor." The next day, he delivered a speech criticizing a $535 million bailout the Obama administration gave to the solar power industry, saying it was "lost to the country Solyndra", in spite of the fact that Solyndra is a company, not a nation.

Perry reflected on his presidential campaign in December 2011 and attempted to downplay his gaffes, saying voters were not looking for "someone who's gonna be perfect in every way." He spoke candidly about back pain which remained during his early months on the trail, saying he was "fatigued" after his surgery in July 2011, but was feeling healthier and noticed personal improvements in his energy levels. Vanity Fair printed a story ascribing Perry's demeanor during the early debates to his being "uncomfortable" as he twisted his torso and wore orthopedic shoes and a back brace.

A Reuters article predicted that the early caucuses of South Carolina could be "Perry's last stand" to prove himself a viable candidate, but his strong campaign finances would enable him to sustain a campaign without increasing popular support. The National Journal featured a story on Dave Carney, Perry's campaign strategist since 1998, observing that he was astute and methodical in his operations, and that the campaign enjoyed good funds and organization. The article stated that the campaign's "biggest failing" was "the candidate and his ability to deliver a message."

=== Further setbacks and reassessment ===
The 11,911 signatures that the Perry campaign submitted to place his name on the Virginia primary ballot were judged to not have the required valid 10,000 signatures, as was the case also with the slightly fewer signatures submitted by Newt Gingrich's campaign. As a result, only Mitt Romney and Ron Paul qualified from among the field of Republican candidates. Perry filed a federal lawsuit claiming the state's requirements for ballot access are unconstitutional.

After results from the Iowa caucuses on January 3, 2012, indicated that Perry would finish fifth with just over 10% of the vote, he stated that he would "return to Texas, assess the results of tonight's caucus, [and] determine whether there is a path forward for myself in this race." The next morning, his campaign director told staff that Perry would not come to a decision for another "day or two", but hours later, Perry told reporters that he would continue forward and would refocus his efforts on South Carolina. Perry was encouraged to continue forward by a friend of his, who reminded Perry that there were over 450,000 veterans in South Carolina, and Perry's stance on veteran's issues and social conservatism would be a natural fit there. Mike Huckabee, who ran for president in 2008, said Perry's "reassessment" was a poor choice, saying, "In a campaign you never say, 'I might not make it.' I just think that was an incredibly bad blunder from a tactical standpoint."

=== South Carolina and suspension of campaign ===
Perry chose to write off New Hampshire and did not invest much time or money in the state, instead going to South Carolina. During a debate, he was critical of Obama's withdrawal from Iraq, and said he would send troops back into Iraq. He said it was a mistake to withdraw so early, and warned that the Iranians would come in and invade "literally with the speed of light".

The government of Turkey responded to Perry's allegation that it was run by Islamic terrorists by stating that Perry's low rankings in the polls and primaries showed that his views were not widely shared. Anders Fogh Rasmussen, the Secretary General of NATO, stated: "I strongly disagree with these statements. And to be very brief I have noted that the Turkish foreign ministry said that Perry's comments were baseless and inappropriate."

On January, 19 two days before the South Carolina primary, Perry suspended his campaign and endorsed Newt Gingrich for president. Perry endorsed Mitt Romney after Gingrich suspended his campaign in late April.

== Endorsements ==
List of Rick Perry endorsements

Perry received endorsements from:

U.S. Senators

- Jim Inhofe, Oklahoma

U.S. Representatives

- John Carter of Texas
- Mike Coffman of Colorado
- Mike Conaway of Texas
- John Culberson of Texas
- Sam Graves of Missouri
- Jeb Hensarling of Texas
- Mike McCaul of Texas
- Candice Miller of Michigan
- Mick Mulvaney of South Carolina
- Steve Scalise of Louisiana

Governors and state constitutional officers

- Governor Bobby Jindal of Louisiana
- Governor Brian Sandoval of Nevada
- Governor Sam Brownback of Kansas
- Commissioner Michael G. Strain of the Louisiana Department of Agriculture and Forestry

State legislators

California

- Assemblyman Daniel Logue

Mississippi

- Henry Barbour, RNC National Committeeman and nephew of Mississippi Governor Haley Barbour.

Florida

- Don Gaetz, state senator
- Jeff Brandes, state representative
- Dean Cannon, Speaker of the Florida House of Representatives
- Matt Gaetz, state representative
- Carlos Lopez-Cantera, State Representative and House Majority Leader

South Carolina

- Harvey Peeler, State Senator and State Senate Majority Leader
- David Wilkins, former Speaker of the South Carolina House of Representatives and former Ambassador to Canada

Other

- Ted Cruz, former Solicitor General of Texas (2003–2008)
- Kinky Friedman, former Independent candidate for Governor of Texas in 2006, country singer, and mystery author.
- David Wilkins, former Speaker of the South Carolina House of Representatives and former Ambassador to Canada
- Joe Arpaio, Sheriff of Maricopa County, Arizona
- James R. Leininger, entrepreneur and philanthropist
- Dean Cain, actor known for playing Clark Kent/Superman in the TV Series Lois & Clark: The New Adventures of Superman.
- Van Poole, former chairman of the Florida Republican Party from 1989 to 1993.
- Marcus Luttrell, Navy Seal
- Steve Forbes, businessman, CEO of Forbes, Inc., and 2000 Republican presidential contender.
- Kurt Wuelper, New Hampshire Right to Life President.
