= Josh Devore =

American baseball player (1887–1954)

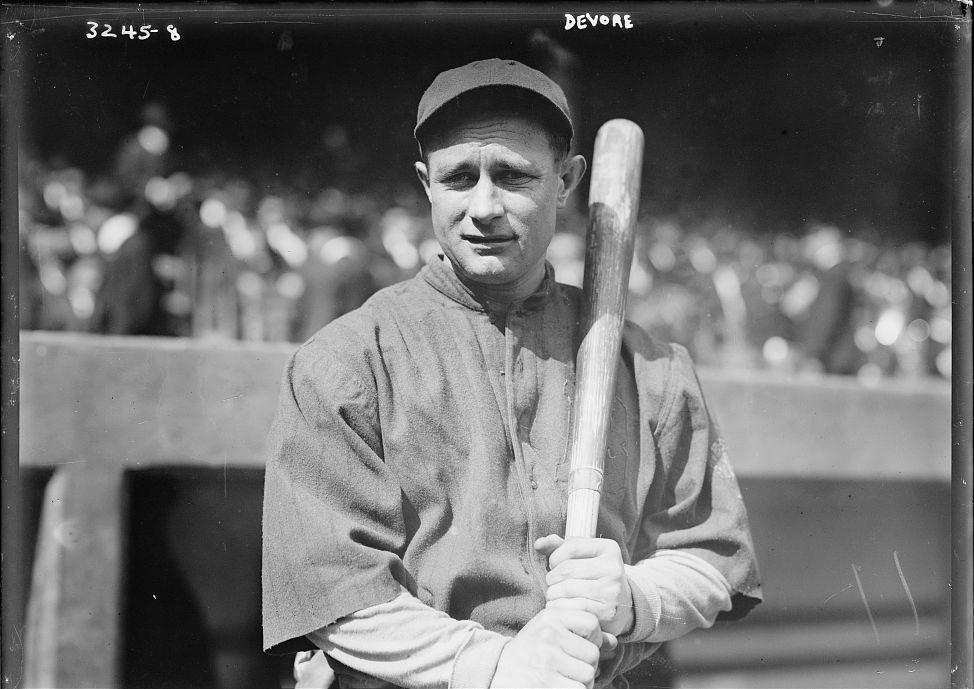
- Outfielder
- Born: November 13, 1887; Murray City, Ohio, U.S.
- Died: October 6, 1954 (aged 66); Chillicothe, Ohio, U.S.
- Batted: Left Threw: Right

MLB debut
- September 25, 1908, for the New York Giants

Last MLB appearance
- October 6, 1914, for the Boston Braves

MLB statistics
- Batting average: .277
- Home runs: 11
- Runs batted in: 149
- Stolen bases: 160
- Stats at Baseball Reference

Teams
- New York Giants (1908–1913); Cincinnati Reds (1913); Philadelphia Phillies (1913–1914); Boston Braves (1914)

Career highlights and awards
- World Series champion (1914)

Joshua M. Devore (November 13, 1887 – October 6, 1954) was an American professional baseball player who played outfield in the major leagues from 1908–1914. He would play for the Cincinnati Reds, Philadelphia Phillies, New York Giants, and Boston Braves.

Devore resided in Seelyville, a small community in Vigo County, Indiana during his early pro baseball career, getting his start in what was known as the Trolley League in Terre Haute, Indiana. Due to his quickness, Josh was known as "The Seelyville Speed Demon." In his prime, Devore was an expert bunter and baserunner who was adept at drawing walks, and he was an effective leadoff man for the Giants' pennant-winners of 1911 and 1912. In the off-season, he owned and operated a boxing gym in Fontanet, Indiana. Devore stood at just 5'6".

== Career ==
As a teenager, Devore played for the Meridian Ribboners of the Cotton States League, hitting poorly the two years he was there. However, in 1908 he moved the Eastern League and hit .290 for the Newark Indians. He joined the New York Giants in September, just in time to watch them lose a playoff game to the Chicago Cubs and finish second in the National League.

Devore's first year as a regular was 1910, which was also the only year he hit .300 in the majors. In 1911, he finished second in the league with 61 stolen bases. In the 1911 World Series, however, Devore went 0 for 3 in steal attempts and batted .167. In the following year's World Series, he improved to .250, but the Giants lost for the second straight time.

Devore was traded to the Cincinnati Reds, then to the Philadelphia Phillies in 1913. In 1914, he was traded once more, to the Boston Braves; he arrived in time for the "Miracle Braves" stretch run which saw them win the National League pennant and World Series.

However, Devore batted .227 for Boston and was released the following January. He spent 1915 in the Ohio State League and played in various minor leagues until 1924. He was a player-manager for the Grand Rapids Joshers of the Central League in 1920 and 1921, leading the team to the 1920 league championship.

In a 7 year, 601 game major league career, Devore compiled a .277 batting average (520-for-1874) with 331 runs, 11 home runs, 149 RBI and 160 stolen bases.

Devore died at the age of 66 and was buried at New Marshfield Cemetery in New Marshfield, Ohio.

== See also ==
- List of Major League Baseball career stolen bases leaders
