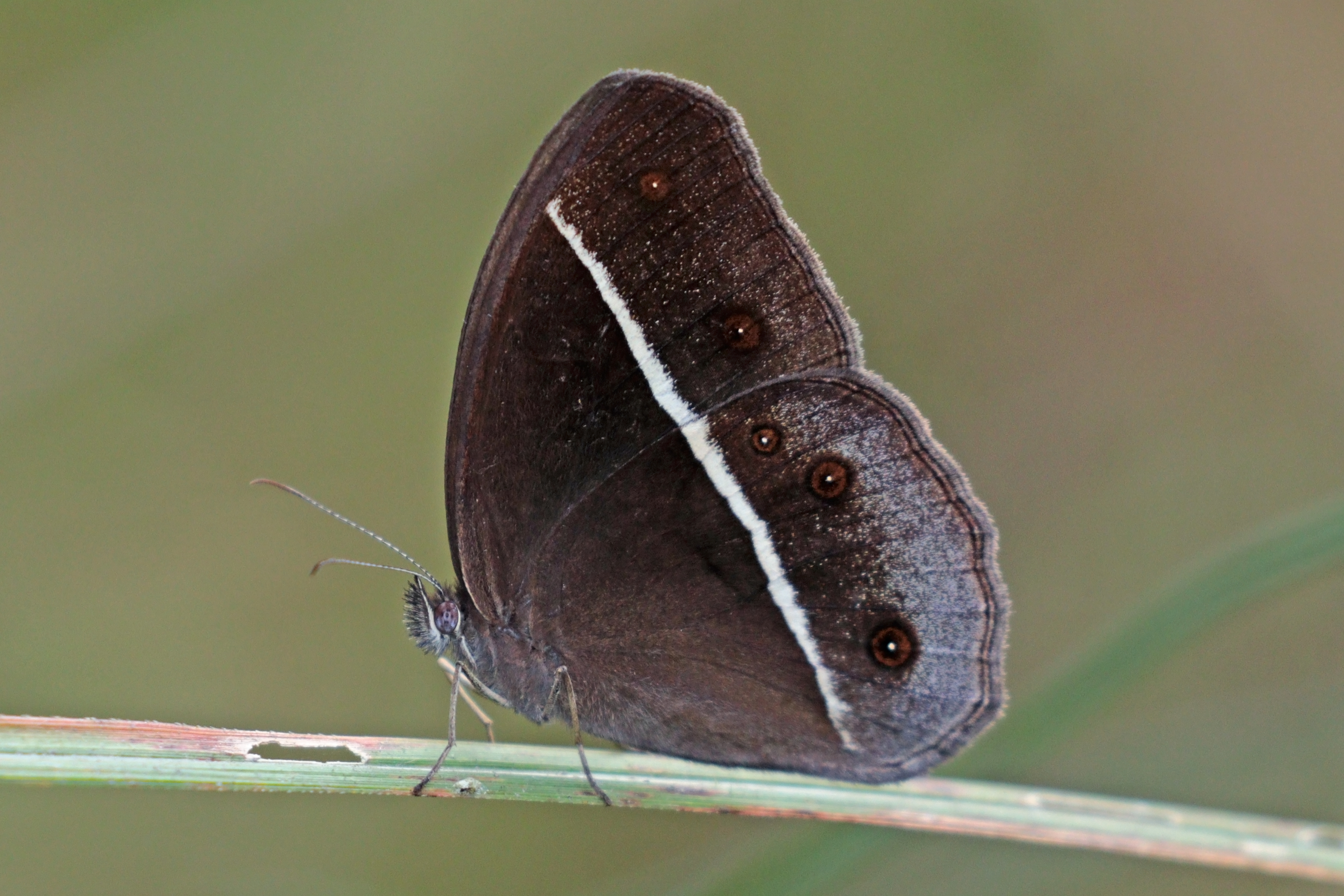
- O. m. medus, dry season form, Nepal
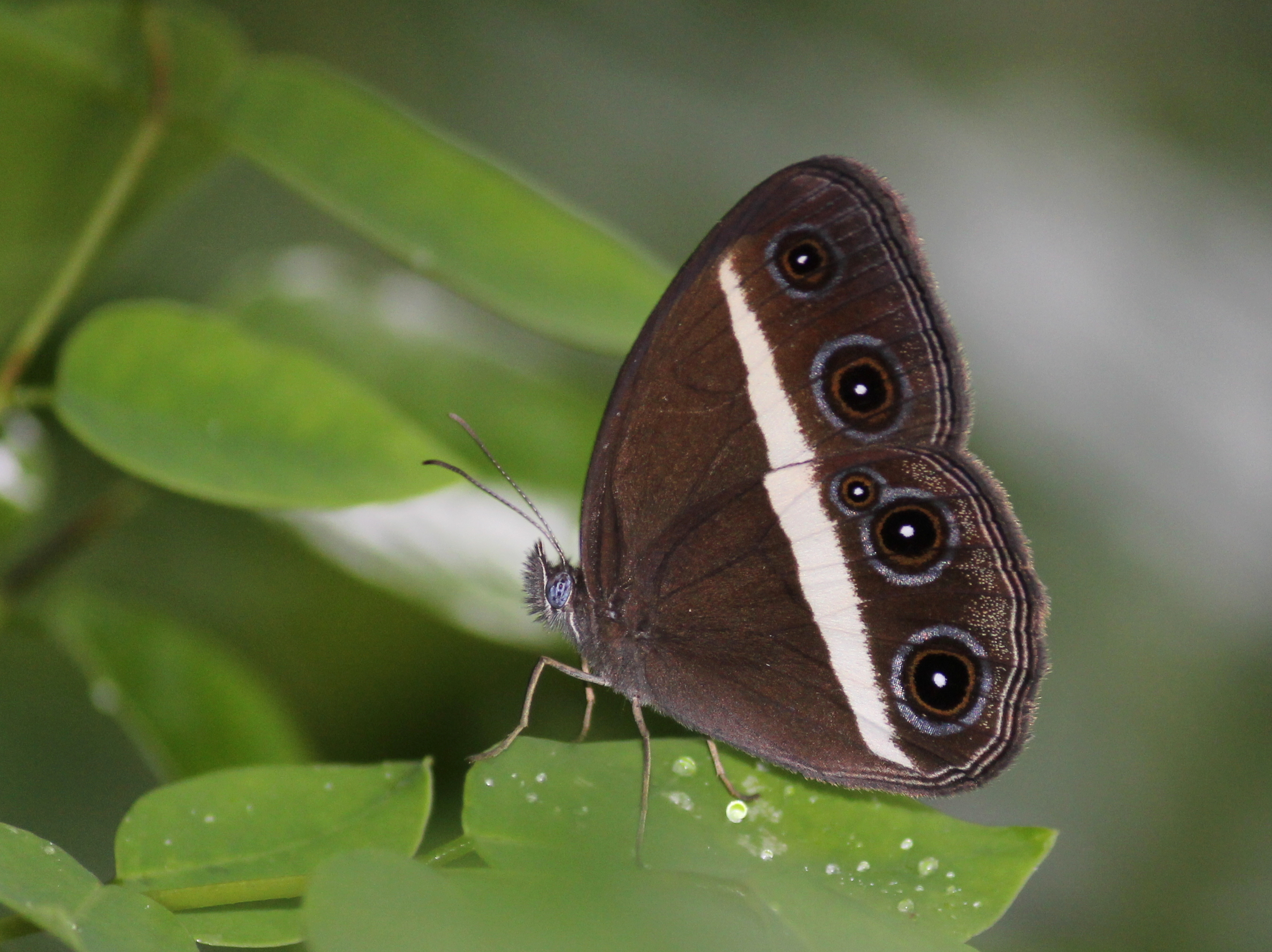
- O. m. mandata, Kerala, India

Scientific classification
- Kingdom: Animalia
- Phylum: Arthropoda
- Clade: Pancrustacea
- Class: Insecta
- Order: Lepidoptera
- Family: Nymphalidae
- Genus: Orsotriaena; Wallengren, 1858
- Species: O. medus

Binomial name
- Orsotriaena medus (Fabricius, 1775)

Synonyms
- Mycalesis mandata Moore, 1857

= Orsotriaena =

Species of butterfly

Orsotriaena medus is a butterfly found in south Asia, southeast Asia, and Australia. It is the only species in the genus Orsotriaena, first described by Hans Daniel Johan Wallengren in 1858.

== Historical name and new common names ==
The butterfly has historically been called the nigger referring to its dark brown colour, but it has been renamed in Australian faunal works to smooth-eyed bushbrown, medus brown in India, and dark grass-brown in Southeast Asia.

== Description ==
Orsotriaena medus is a medium-sized butterfly with wingspan of 45 to 55 mm (1.8 to 2.2 in). The butterfly is dark brown above with a thin marginal pale border. The upper hindwing having a thin submarginal line. There are no eyespots on the upperside of the wings.

Below, the butterfly has a white discal band which runs across both wings. It has five eyespots on the underside of the wings. In the forewing, it has two eyespots, with the anterior eyespot slightly smaller. In the hindwing, it has two eyespots on the apical region and a separate ocellus in the tornal (hindmost) region. The uppermost of the eyespots in the hindwing are greatly smaller, while the remaining two are more or less of equal sizes.

The eggs are spherical and yellowish. They are laid on the leaf blades and stems of grasses. The larvae are spindle shaped, transversely wrinkled, and covered in small tubercles, giving it a rough appearance. Two long brown spines on the head point forward, while a pair of pinkish prongs project from the anal segment. The colour above is rosy red with a blue dorsal and a white lateral line, below which, the underparts are green.

The pupae are perpendicularly suspended, slender and regular, except that the head-case is produced into a long beak formed of two thin processes like split straws. The colour is whitish brown to yellow, with faint bands of a darker shades. It resembles a large grain of barley or a tiny banana.

Orsotriaena medus superficially resembles members of the genus Mycalesis (bushbrowns), but can readily be identified by the number of spots.

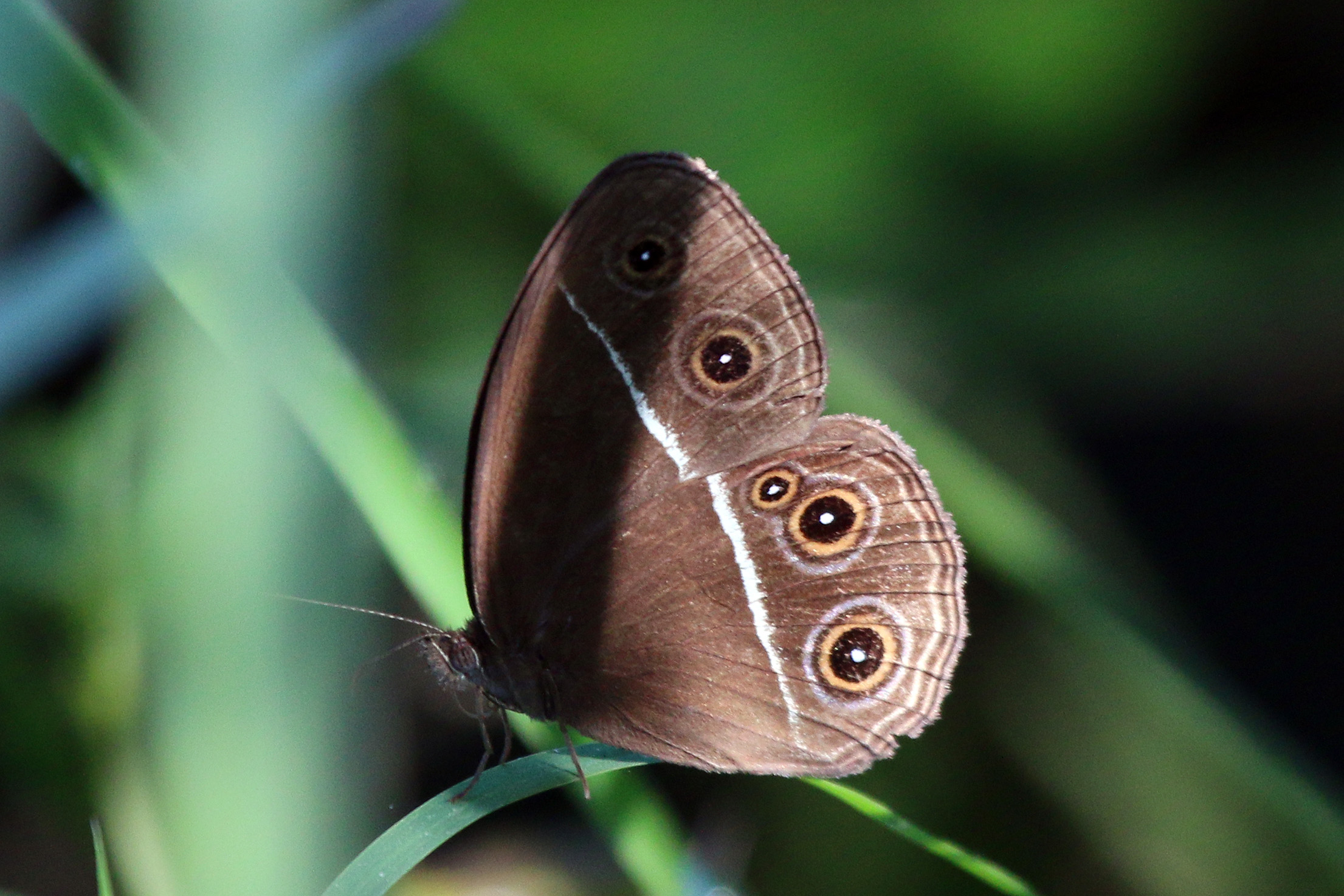
Orsotriaena medus cinerea, Indonesia

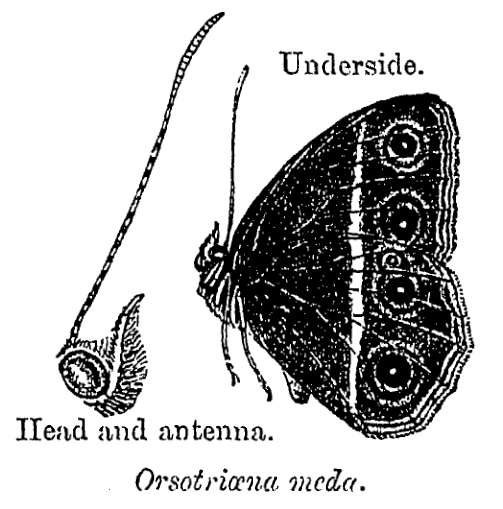
1905 illustration of Orsotriaena medus

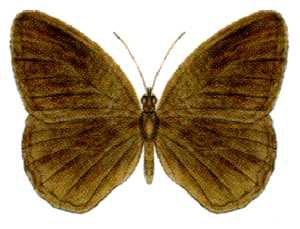
Orsotriaena medus moira, the upper surfaces of the wings of the species are unmarked and plain brown

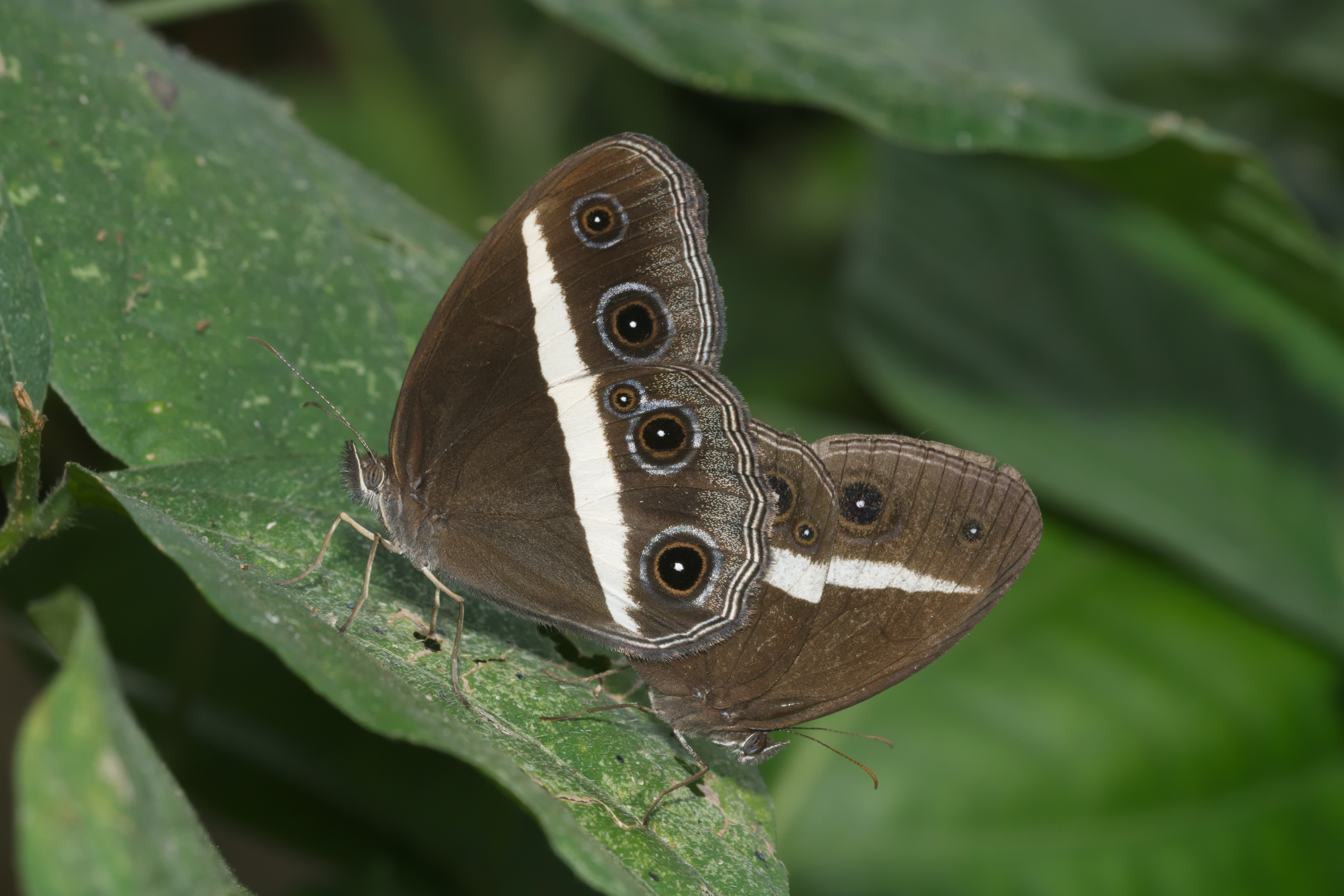
Mating pair

== Distribution and habitat ==
Orsotriaena medus is native to India, Nepal, Sri Lanka, Myanmar, Cambodia, Thailand, southern Yunnan, Malaysia, the Indonesian archipelago, the Philippines, New Guinea, New Britain and Australia.

In India, the butterfly occurs in South India, Punjab, Uttar Pradesh, Bihar, West Bengal, Sikkim, Assam, Nagaland, the Andaman and Nicobar Islands.

O. medus is very common in grassy habitats up to an altitude of 1,600 m (5,200 ft). A shy, weak-flying insect, it stays low amongst the undergrowth, and when disturbed flies for a short distance before settling down. The butterfly basks in the sun, often with its body aligned parallel to the sun's rays.

== Taxonomy ==
Orsotriaena medus is classified under the subfamily Satyrinae (the browns) of the brush-footed butterfly family Nymphalidae. Orsotriaena medus is divided into several subspecies, listed below with their respective synonyms and geographical ranges.

- Orsotriaena Wallengren, 1858

syn. Orstriaena Young, 1903; Orsotrioena Bingham, 1905

- Orsotriaena medus (Fabricius, 1775)

syn. Papilio medus Fabricius, 1775; Mycalesis mandosa Butler, 1868
- Orsotriaena medus cinerea (Butler, 1867) – Sundaland

syn. Mycalesis cinerea Butler, 1867

- Orsotriaena medus jopas (Hewitson, 1864) – North Sulawesi

syn. Mycalesis jopas Hewitson, 1864

- Orsotriaena medus mandata (Moore, 1857) – Sri Lanka, South India

syn. Mycalesis mandata Moore, 1857

- Orsotriaena medus medus (Fabricius, 1775) – N. India to Thailand, Timor, the Philippines, Papua New Guinea, South Yunnan

syn. Papilio hesione Cramer, 1775; Papilio doris Stoll, 1781; Mycalesis runeka Moore, 1857

- Orsotriaena medus mendice (Fruhstorfer, 1911) – South Sulawesi

syn. Orsotriaena mendice Fruhstorfer 1911

- Orsotriaena medus moira (Waterhouse & Lyell, 1914) – Banks Island, Darnley Island, Cape York

syn. Orsotriaena moira Waterhouse & Lyell, 1914

- Orsotriaena medus mutata (Butler, 1875) – New Britain

syn. Orsotriaena mutata Butler, 1875

- Orsotriaena medus paupercula (Fruhstorfer, 1908) – Sula Islands

syn. Orsotriaena paupercula Fruhstorfer, 1908

- Orsotriaena medus zipoetina (Fruhstorfer, 1908) – Sumatra

syn. Orsotriaena zipoetina Fruhstorfer, 1908

== Ecology and behaviour ==
The larvae feed on grasses, including rice plants (Oryza sativa), sugarcanes (Saccharum officinarum), and para grass (Brachiaria mutica). They are predominantly crepuscular, but can sometimes be active during daytime.

== See also ==
- Mycalesis
- Use of nigger in proper names
