= Seppänen (island) =

Island in Finland

Coordinates: 62°27′17″N 29°37′13″E

Seppanen (formerly Neekerisaari) is an island in Finland. It is located in the economic region of Joensuu and the province of Pohjois-Karjala, in the southeastern part of the country, 300 km northeast of Helsinki, the capital of the country.

The climate is boreal.

The average temperature is 0 °C (32 °F). The warmest month is August, at 16 °C (61 °F), and the coldest is January, at −16 °C (3 °F)

It was previously knows as Neekerisaari (lit. 'Nigger Island') before having its name changed in 2020.
