= Bigger Hair =

American tobacco brand

Bigger Hair Smoking Tobacco, formerly known as Nigger Hair Smoking Tobacco, was an American brand of tobacco manufactured by the B. Leidersdorf Company. It was first produced in 1878 but is no longer manufactured.

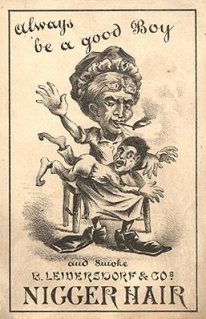
Poster

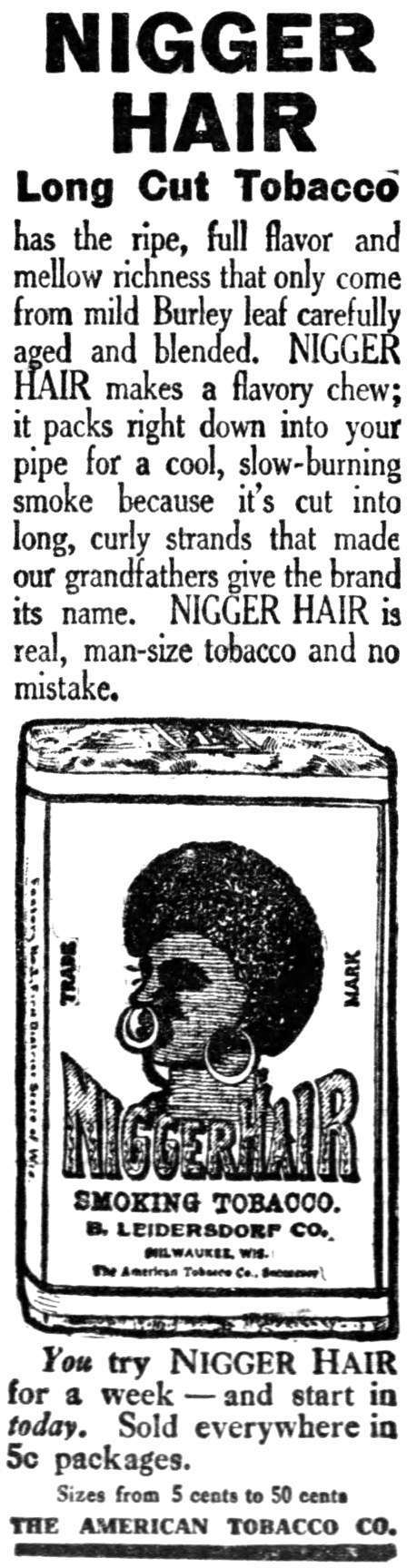
Portion of an advertisement, June 15, 1916, Wisconsin State Journal

== History ==
Nigger Hair Smoking Tobacco was first manufactured by the Milwaukee, Wisconsin-based B. Leidersdorf Company in 1878. According to the company the product was named after "its distinctive, curly Long Cut strands". The product was sold at economic prices and packaged in metal tins with "the head of a negro surmounted with a copious crop of wool, and having a large ring pending from the nose and another from the ear" stamped on the front. Early advertisements for Nigger Hair bore the tagline "Always be a good boy and smoke B. Leidersdorf and Co.'s Nigger Hair". In 1917, tickets for tradeable Nigger Hair Smoking Tobacco were commissioned by the American Tobacco Company. The production company changed the product's name to "Bigger Hair" in the 1950s, following fierce criticism from the National Association for the Advancement of Colored People (NAACP). The product was sold predominantly in North America. Today, its tins remain a prominent collector's item and can be found at various auctions.

The product featured in the 2004 mockumentary C.S.A.: The Confederate States of America using its original name, alongside other products or businesses considered racist alternative timeline commercials.

== Trademark infringement ==
Leidersdorf filed a civil lawsuit in 1879 against a rival tobacco merchant by the surname of Flint who sold the Big Indian brand of Tobacco. Leidersdorf argued that Flint had infringed Nigger Hair's trademark. After discussion the judges ruled in favor of Leidersdorf and concluded that the two logos were similar enough to make consumer deception "plausible and probable".
