= Nik, South Khorasan =

Nik نيك
- Village
- Location within Iran
- Coordinates: 32°24′48″N 59°41′45″E
- Country: Iran
- Province: South Khorasan
- County: Sarbisheh
- Bakhsh: Central
- Rural District: Momenabad

Population (2006)
  - Total: 201
- Time zone: UTC+3:30 (IRST)
  - Summer (DST): UTC+4:30 (IRDT)
- Area code: +98

Nik (Persian: نيك, also Romanized as Nīk, Nig, and Neyk; also known as Neyj and Nik Mo’men Abad) is a village in Momenabad Rural District, in the Central District of Sarbisheh County, South Khorasan Province, Iran. At the 2006 census, its population was 201, in 57 families.
