= Charlie Niebergall =

American baseball player (1899–1982)

- Catcher
- Born: May 23, 1899; New York, New York, U.S.
- Died: August 29, 1982 (aged 83); Holiday, Florida, U.S.
- Batted: Right Threw: Right

MLB debut
- June 17, 1921, for the St. Louis Cardinals

Last MLB appearance
- September 28, 1924, for the St. Louis Cardinals

MLB statistics
- Batting average: .228
- Home runs: 0
- Runs batted in: 8
- Stats at Baseball Reference

Teams
- St. Louis Cardinals (1921, 1923–1924)

Charles Arthur Niebergall (May 23, 1899 – August 29, 1982) was an American professional baseball catcher and scout. He appeared in 54 major league games over three seasons for the St. Louis Cardinals. Listed at 5 feet 10 inches (1.78 m) and 160 pounds (73 kg), he threw and batted right-handed. Niebergall was one of a number of baseball players in the first half of the 20th century to be nicknamed "Nig", being referred to as such in newspaper reports as early as June 1923.

Niebergall spent the entire 1924 season with the Cardinals, playing in 40 games (17 as starting catcher) and batting .293. All told, he had 21 major-league hits, with eight doubles and eight runs batted in. He played in the minor leagues for all or part of 14 seasons between 1920 and 1935, and scouted for the Boston Red Sox after his playing career ended.
