= Julio Bonetti =

Italian baseball player (1911–1952)

- Pitcher
- Born: July 14, 1911; Genoa, Italy
- Died: June 17, 1952 (aged 40); Belmont, California, U.S.
- Batted: Right Threw: Right

MLB debut
- April 22, 1937, for the St. Louis Browns

Last MLB appearance
- April 22, 1940, for the Chicago Cubs

MLB statistics
- Win–loss record: 6–14
- Earned run average: 6.03
- Strikeouts: 50
- Stats at Baseball Reference

Teams
- St. Louis Browns (1937–1938); Chicago Cubs (1940)

Julio Giacomo Bonetti (July 14, 1911 – June 17, 1952) was an Italian born right-handed pitcher in Major League Baseball for the St. Louis Browns and Chicago Cubs. He is one of only seven Italian-born Major League Baseball players in history.

Bonetti made his major league debut with the Browns on April 22, 1937. He became a versatile pitcher for the lowly Browns that season, pitching in 12 games out of the bullpen (notching one save) and starting 16 others, seven of which he completed. He managed just a 4–11 record and a 5.84 ERA, but his ERA was actually better than the last-place team's average of 6.00.

Nevertheless, in 1938 Bonetti pitched exclusively in relief, going 2–3 with a 6.35 ERA in 17 games. His contract was purchased by the Cubs in February 1939, and after some time playing for the Los Angeles Angels of the minor Pacific Coast League, Bonetti worked his way onto the Cubs roster in April 1940. Unfortunately, his Cub debut, which came three years to the day after his major league debut, was disastrous. Bonetti allowed three runs on three hits and four walks in just 1 1/3 innings for an ERA of 20.25. He never pitched in the major leagues again.

Bonetti returned to the Angels, were he saw success, winning 14 games in 1940 and pitching 64 consecutive innings without a walk. On July 2, 1941, however, he was banned from baseball by William Bramham, President of the National Association of Professional Baseball Leagues. A two-month long investigation had discovered that Bonetti had taken money to throw games. Although Bonetti protested the decision, a subsequent reapplication for reinstatement in September 1941 was denied.

Forced to find work outside of baseball, Bonetti became a carpenter and athletic instructor. He served in the U.S. Army during World War II. Bonetti died June 17, 1952, in Belmont, California, after suffering a heart attack.
