= Nigg =

Nigg may refer to:

== Places ==
- Nigg, Aberdeen, Scotland
- Nigg, Highland, Scotland
- Nigg Rock, Antarctica

== People ==
- Joel Nigg, American psychologist
- Joseph Nigg (1782–1863), Austrian painter
- Killing of Michael Nigg
- Serge Nigg (1924–2008), French composer

== Other uses ==
- Nigg Stone, a Pictish carved stone in Easter Ross

== See also ==
- NIG (disambiguation)
- Nigger and nigga, racial slurs against black people
