= Nig (nickname) =

Nig was the nickname of some American athletes of the late 19th and early 20th century. Before the integration of baseball, a number of baseball players were known by the nickname, often adjudged to be a reference to someone's dark complexion. The nickname is a short form of the racial slur nigger. Notable athletes with the nickname include:

- Vincent Borleske (1887–1957), American minor league baseball player, college football player and coach
- Nig Clarke (1882–1949), Canadian-born baseball player in the United States
- Ashel Cunningham (c. 1884 – 1977), American sports coach, athletics administrator
- George Cuppy (1869–1922), American baseball pitcher
- Nig Fuller (1878–1937), American baseball player
- Johnny Grabowski (1900–1946), American baseball player
- Nig Lipscomb (1911–1978), American baseball player
- Charlie Niebergall (1899–1982), American baseball player
- Nig Perrine (1885–1948), American baseball player
- E. M. Waller (1904–1988), American football player and coach

== See also ==
- Harry Rosen (fl. 1930s–1950s), American mobster in Philadelphia
