= Ashel Cunningham =

American sports coach (c. 1884 – 1977)

Biographical details
- Born: c. 1884; Alexandria, Indiana, U.S.
- Died: February 13, 1977 (aged 92); Marin County, California, U.S.

Playing career

Football
- 1908–1910: Indiana

Baseball
- 1908–1911: Indiana
- Positions: Quarterback (football); Outfielder (baseball)

Coaching career (HC unless noted)

Football
- 1911: Indiana (assistant)
- 1912: DePauw
- 1914–1920: Redlands
- 1921–1924: Riverside Poly HS CA)

Basketball
- 1912–1913: DePauw
- 1917–1921: Redlands
- 1926–1949: Redlands

Baseball
- 1912: Indiana (assistant)

Administrative career (AD unless noted)
- 1912–1913: DePauw
- 1913–1921: Redlands
- 1926–1953: Redlands

Head coaching record
- Overall: 26–33–3 (college football)

Ashel Cunningham (c. 1884 – February 13, 1977), nicknamed Heze and Nig, was an American football, basketball, and baseball, track and field, and golf coach and athletics administrator.

A native of Alexandria, Indiana, Cunningham attended Indiana University, where he played football as a quarterback and baseball as an outfielder before graduating in 1911. He served as an assistant football coach at Indiana under James M. Sheldon in 1911, and coached freshmen athletics at his alma mater that year. In 1912, he was hired as athletic director and coach at DePauw University in Greencastle, Indiana, succeeding Arthur Berndt.

A year later, Cunningham left DePauw to become the athletic director at the University of Redlands in Redlands, California. He coached football, basketball, baseball, and track at Redlands for eight years before leaving, in 1921, for Riverside Polytechnic High School in Riverside, California, where he coached football, baseball, and track. Cunningham returned to Redlands in late 1926 as athletic director and coach of basketball, baseball, and track.

Cunningham died on February 13, 1977, at the age of 92, in Marin County, California.

== Head coaching record ==
=== College football ===
Year	Team	Overall	Conference	Standing	Bowl/playoffs
DePauw (Independent) (1912)
1912	DePauw	3–5			
DePauw:		3–5			
Redlands Baptists (Independent) (1913–1914)
1913	Redlands	2–3–1			
1914	Redlands	1–6			
Redlands Baptists/Bulldogs (Southern California Conference) (1915–1920)
1915	Redlands	5–4			
1916	Redlands	4–3	1–3	4th	
1917	Redlands	3–2			
1918	Redlands	3–2			
1919	Redlands	3–4–1	1–3	4th	
1920	Redlands	2–4–1	1–3–1	5th	
Redlands:		23–28–3			
Total:		26–33–3			
