= Darlie =

Brand of toothpaste

- Logo used since 2024

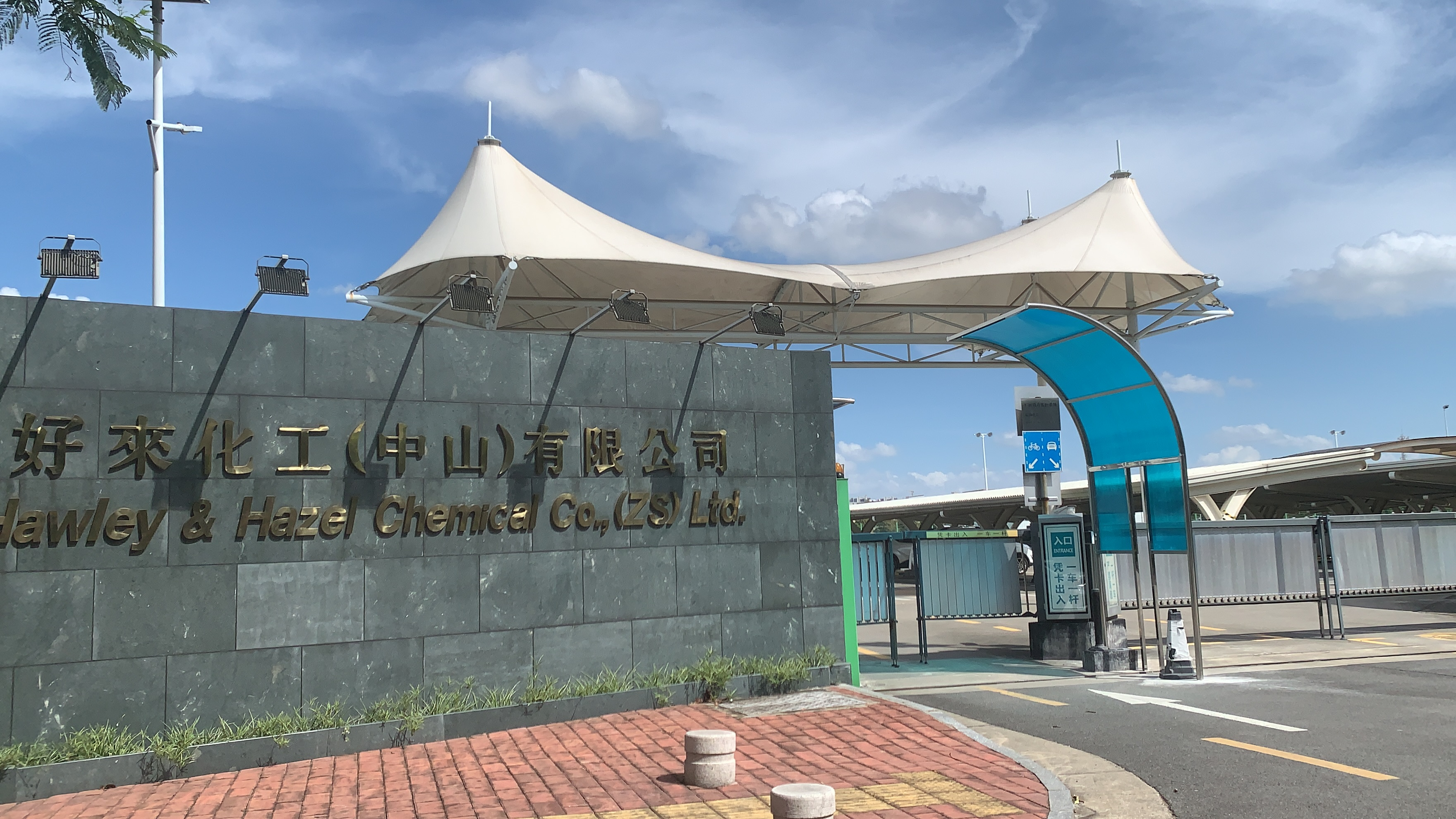
- Hawley & Hazel (Zhongshan) headquarters and factories in Guangdong, China
- Product type: Oral hygiene
- Current owner: Hawley & Hazel
- Produced by: Hawley & Hazel
- Country: Republic of China (1933–); Hong Kong (1973–)
- Introduced: 7 December 1933; 92 years ago
- Markets: Asia
- Website: www.darlie.com

Darlie (formerly Darkie) is an oral care brand owned and manufactured by the Hawley & Hazel Company with a focus on Asian markets. The company is headquartered in Taiwan with manufacturing facilities in Songshan District, Taipei.

== History ==
The brand was launched as Darkie in Shanghai in the 1930s. Colgate-Palmolive acquired 50% equity in Hawley & Hazel in 1985. After the entry of Colgate-Palmolive, the brand continued to be sold in several Asian countries, including Taiwan, China, Indonesia, Malaysia, Singapore, Vietnam and Thailand. Colgate-Palmolive announced the brand would not be sold outside of Asia.

Darkie is one of several other racist name brands featured in mock-advertisements contained in the mockumentary C.S.A.: The Confederate States of America, which are depicted as fictional brands popular in the alternative history of the film, but revealed during the end credits to be real.

== Naming ==
The Chinese name of the brand was 黑人牙膏; hēirén yágāo, lit. 'Black Person Toothpaste'. The English name "Darky," (or "Darkie"), is a term that can be used as a racial slur for Black people. The packaging featured an image of a black man wearing a top hat, monocle, and bow-tie, in a style some people associated with minstrel shows in the US.

In 1985, when Colgate-Palmolive acquired 50% of Hawley & Hazel, controversy erupted over the brand in the United States, to which Colgate-Palmolive CEO Ruben Mark responded by issuing an apology. He changed the English name of the toothpaste to "Darlie" in 1989, and altered the image on the packaging to show a racially ambiguous face in a top hat. The Chinese name remained the same and a Chinese-language advertising campaign reassured customers that "Black Person Toothpaste is still Black Person Toothpaste".

On June 19, 2020, following the murder of George Floyd and subsequent protests, Colgate-Palmolive announced it would work with Hawley & Hazel "...to review and further evolve all aspects" of the Darlie brand, including the brand name. At the time of the announcement, the Chinese name of Darlie was unchanged (still "黑人牙膏"). The announcement followed similar announcements made by PepsiCo–Quaker Oats (Aunt Jemima) and Mars, Incorporated (Uncle Ben's) for their respective brands.

On December 14, 2021, Hawley & Hazel announced the Chinese name of the brand will be changed from "黑人牙膏" ("Black Person Toothpaste") to "好來" ("Hawley / Good things will come") starting in March 2022, aligning it with the subsidiary company's name.

Darkie toothpaste packaging from Thailand in 1988

== Product and market share ==
The original flavor of Darlie was mint. Other flavors are available for children.

In 1989, the toothpaste held a 75% market share in Taiwan, 50% in Singapore, 30% in Malaysia and Hong Kong and 20% in Thailand. As of late 2018, Darlie is one of the bestselling toothpaste brands in its target market areas, with market shares ranging from 10 to 30 percent.

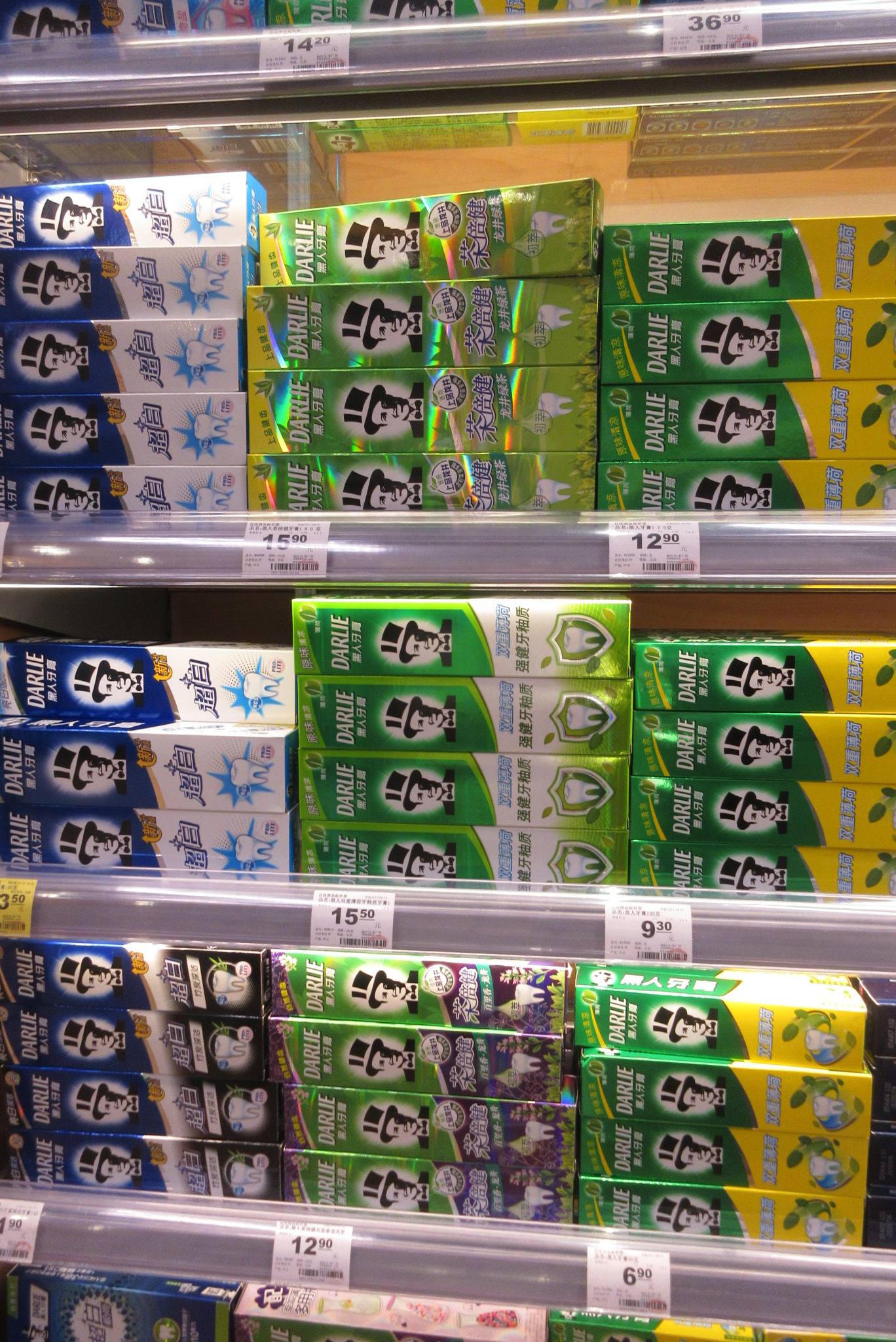
Darlie toothpaste in China, 2017

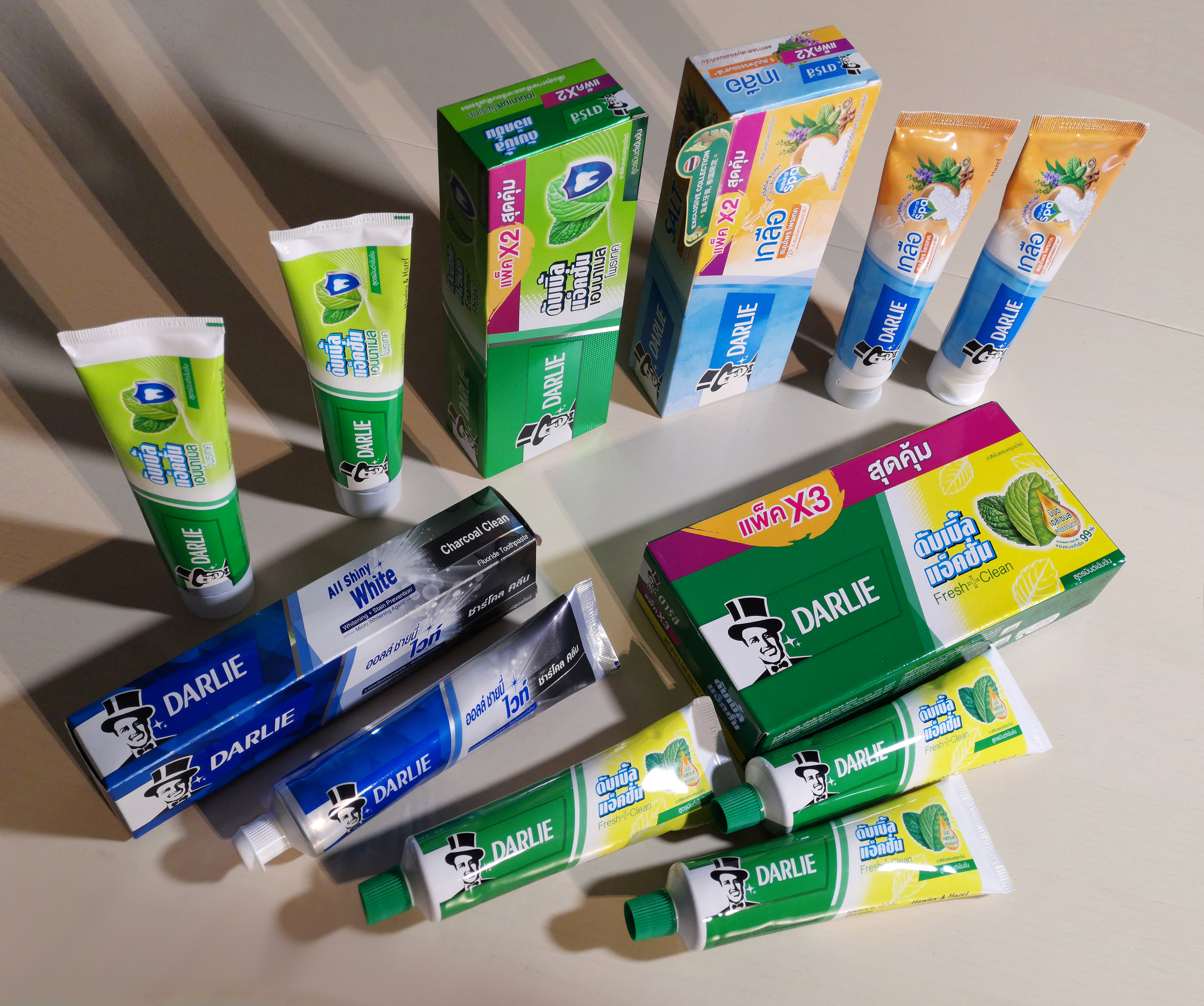
Darlie toothpaste in Thailand, 2023

== See also ==
- Chocolate-coated marshmallow treats, which in many languages are named with words akin to "darky"
- Commercial products using the word "nigger"
- List of toothpaste brands
- Index of oral health and dental articles
- Aunt Jemima
- Ben's Original
