= Negro Head Road =

Place near Wilmington, North Carolina, U.S.

Negro (or Nigger) Head Road is a place outside Wilmington, North Carolina with similar displays in other Southern towns, where body parts of slaves or blacks were displayed in consequence of a purported crime. It is modeled after displays like Blackhead Signpost Road in Southampton County, Virginia. It was here, in 1831, where the head of a slave, Alfred, was displayed on a stake for being part of Nat Turner's Rebellion, as a warning for any future rebels.

== Slave history ==
=== Origins ===
Negro Head Road ran from Point Peter in New Hanover County to Duplin County, opposite of Wilmington, North Carolina. After the Nat Turner's Rebellion in Virginia, a similar slave revolt was building in Wilmington. A slave named Dave, who belonged to Sheriff Thomas K. Morrisey, was planning to march to Wilmington with a group of conspirators, killing white landowners on the way. In Wilmington, they planned to meet up with over 2,000 other slaves and free blacks to continue their killing raid. Dave was tortured into admitting that he was the leader of this revolt, and he and his accomplice, Jim, were killed and decapitated. Their heads were then staked on poles and placed along the road as a warning to other slaves. These slaves would be marched through the road, forced to look at the display, as a clear threat of what would happen to them if they misbehaved. In Wilmington, 15 blacks were arrested, and 6 were found guilty and killed. Their heads, too, were staked and placed along the road, with one at Point Peter, marking the entrance to Negro Head Road. This display was also used to warn children of how to treat whites and what would happen if they did not behave, creating a scared and submissive younger generation at the time. There is no proof that the men were involved or planning anything. They were beaten and tortured and forced to " confess".

== Military use ==
=== Colored troops ===
Peter Churchill was a runaway prisoner of the American Civil War. He tells that "26 Reg. U.S. Col. Troops were encamped on Nigger head road – about the boundary of the City of Wilmington N.C.", and that they remained there from the time that he got to Wilmington in July 1864 to the end of the war, in May 1865.

=== Battle of Moore's Creek Bridge ===
Negro Head Road was used by Loyalists to safely reach the sea and rendezvous with arriving British forces. However, Patriot Colonel Alexander Lillington used it to reach these loyalist troops and marched his minutemen down this historic road on their way to fight the Battle of Moore's Creek Bridge, where North Carolina Revolutionaries proved victorious over Southern Loyalists.

=== Timothy and Thomas Bloodworth ===
Colonel Timothy Bloodworth (sometimes spelled Bludworth) discovered a hollow tree 7 feet in diameter at Point Peter on Negro Head Road. The Bloodworths were mechanical experts and worked handily with metals to create swords, pistols, and rifles. When Colonel Bloodworth discovered this tree, he believed he could create a rifle to pick off British troops in the town while remaining concealed and far from danger. He did just that and made a rifle of uncommon length and caliber. He and his teenage son at the time, Thomas, set up camp for two weeks in that tree and created an opening targeting Market Dock, where the British troops tended to assemble themselves. And so, they shot their two-ounce balls at the redcoats and were successful in their hidden ambush. Timothy Bloodworth was born in North Carolina and began designing muskets and bayonets for the Continental Army in 1776, carrying on his father's expertise and using the hollow tree to his advantage against the redcoats in the town. The distance was so great, and Point Peter was so well concealed that he could successfully kill these troops and avoid being captured by them.
