= Nig Fuller =

American baseball player (1878-1937)

Charles Fuller
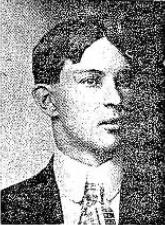
- Fuller, c. 1901
- Catcher
- Born: Charles F. Furrer; March 30, 1878; Toledo, Ohio, U.S.
- Died: March 1, 1937 (aged 58); Toledo, Ohio, U.S.
- Batted: Right Threw: Right

MLB debut
- July 1, 1902, for the Brooklyn Superbas

Last MLB appearance
- July 12, 1902, for the Brooklyn Superbas

MLB statistics
- Batting average: .000 (0-for-9)
- Runs scored: 0
- Runs batted in: 1
- Stats at Baseball Reference

Teams
- Brooklyn Superbas (1902)

Charles F. Fuller (born Charles F. Furrer; March 30, 1878 – March 1, 1937), was an American professional baseball player from 1900 to 1908. He played for the major league Brooklyn Superbas as a catcher in three games during the 1902 season. Fuller was one of several baseball players in the first half of the 20th century to be nicknamed "Nig".

Per his 1918 draft registration card, "Charles F. Furrer" (with a middle initial only) remained his legal name; the card listed his occupation as a railroad switchman, aged 40, married, and living in his hometown of Toledo, Ohio.
