= Nig Lipscomb =

American baseball player (1911–1978)

- Second baseman
- Born: February 24, 1911; Rutherfordton, North Carolina, U.S.
- Died: February 27, 1978 (aged 67); Huntersville, North Carolina, U.S.
- Batted: Right Threw: Right

MLB debut
- April 23, 1937, for the St. Louis Browns

Last MLB appearance
- September 20, 1937, for the St. Louis Browns

MLB statistics
- Batting average: .323
- Home runs: 0
- Runs batted in: 8
- Stats at Baseball Reference

Teams
- St. Louis Browns (1937)

Gerard "Nig" Lipscomb (February 24, 1911 – February 27, 1978) was an American professional baseball infielder during 1933–1947. He played in 36 games for the St. Louis Browns of Major League Baseball in 1937, primarily as a second baseman. Lipscomb was one of several baseball players in the first half of the 20th century to be nicknamed "Nig".
