= Niggerhead =

Former name of items and places

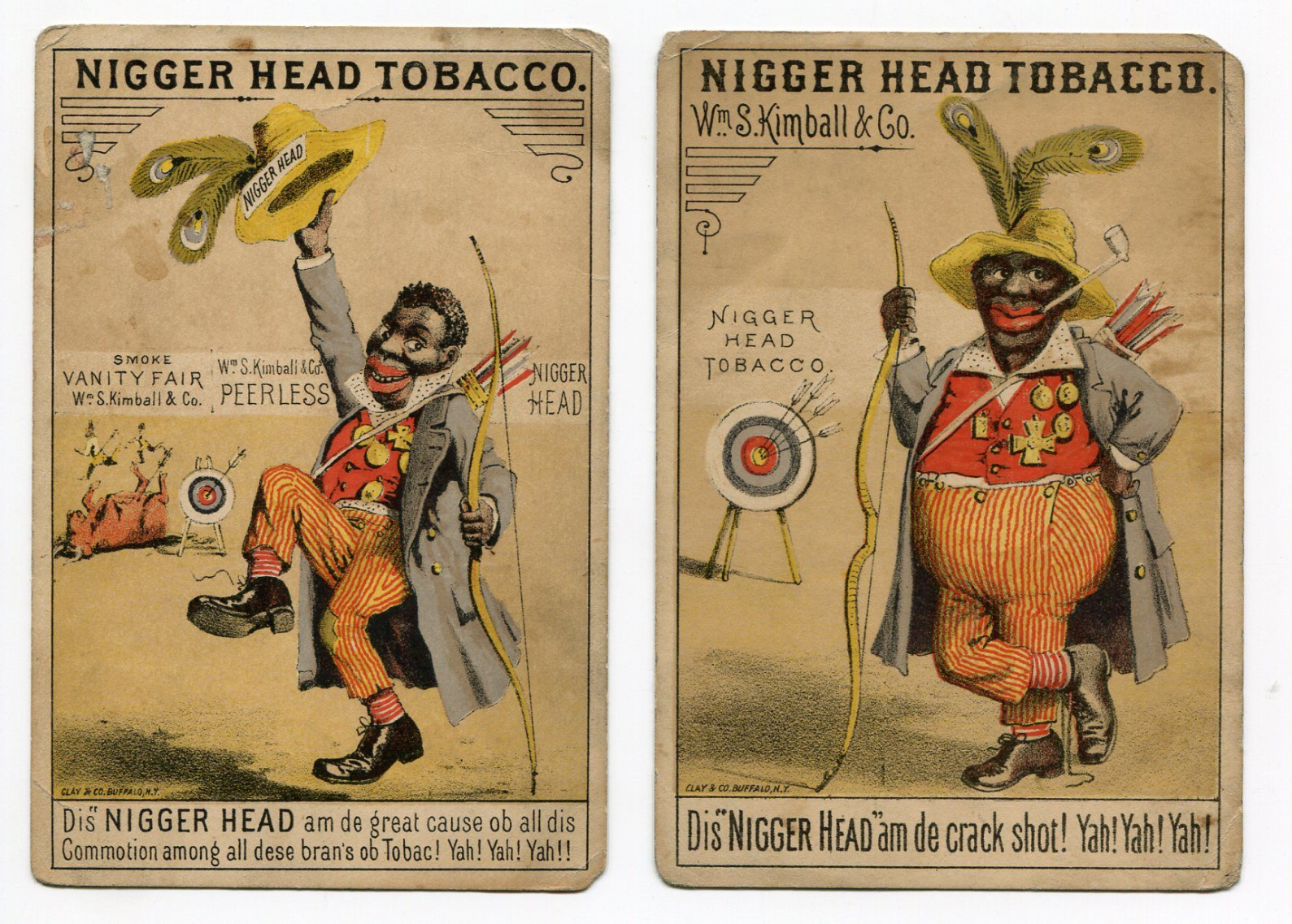
19th-century trade cards advertising "Nigger Head Tobacco"

Negrohead, Arizona, formerly known as "Nigger Head"

"Niggerhead" or "nigger head" is a term historically used in English for various objects thought to resemble the heads of black people. Like the racial slur "nigger" from which it derives, the word is now considered taboo in normal usage.

The term was once widely used for a number of things, including nautical bollards, echinacea plants, and consumer products including soap, chewing tobacco, shoe polish, canned oysters and shrimp, golf tees, and toy cap pistols, among others. It was often used for geographic features such as hills and rocks and geological objects such as geodes. The term appears in several US patents for mechanical devices prior to about 1950.

In 1955, the Aughinbaugh Canning Company of Mississippi renamed its "Nigger Head Brand" oysters to "Negro Head Brand" following pressure from the National Association for the Advancement of Colored People. More than a hundred "Niggerheads", and other place names now considered racially offensive, were changed in 1962 by the U.S. Board on Geographic Names, but many local names remained unchanged.

In October 2011, while Rick Perry was running for president of the United States, controversial reports that his family leased a hunting camp once called "Niggerhead" caused his record on racial issues to be scrutinized.

In August 2021, a large boulder at the University of Wisconsin–Madison was removed after protests by students. The Black Student Union petitioned the university to remove the rock because it had been described in a 1925 Wisconsin State Journal article as a "niggerhead".

== See also ==
- List of rock formations that resemble human beings
- Moor's head
- Use of nigger in proper names
