= Monroe Drillers =

- 1924–1930; (1924–1932, 1937–1941); Monroe, Louisiana

Minor league affiliations
- Class: Class D (1924–1932); Class C (1937–1941)
- League: Cotton States League (1924–1932, 1937–1941)

Major league affiliations
- Team: St. Louis Cardinals (1932)

Minor league titles
- League titles (2): 1938; 1941
- Conference titles (4): 1927; 1939; 1940; 1941
- Wild card berths (1): 1938

Team data
- Name: Monroe Drillers (1924–1930); Monroe Twins (1931–1932, 1937); Monroe White Sox (1938–1941)
- Ballpark: Forsythe Park (1924–1930); Casion Park (1931–1932, 1937–1941)

The Monroe Drillers were a minor league baseball team based in Monroe, Louisiana. From 1924 to 1930, the Monroe "Drillers" began a tenure for Monroe as members of the Class D level Cotton States League, which continued with the Monroe "Twins" and Monroe "White Sox" teams through 1941. Monroe won Cotton States League championships in 1938 and 1941. The 1932 Monroe Twins played the season as a minor league affiliate of the St. Louis Cardinals.

The Monroe Drillers teams hosted home minor league games at Forsythe Park in Monroe through 1930. Beginning in 1931 the Monroe Twins and White Sox teams played Cotton States league home games at the Casino Park ballpark.

== History ==
=== Earlier Monroe minor league teams ===
Monroe first hosted minor league baseball in 1903, when the Monroe "Hill Citys" began play as members of the six-team Class D level Cotton States League and had a two-season tenure in the league. The Drillers were preceded in minor league play by the 1909 Monroe Municipals, who played a partial season as members of the Arkansas State League before relocating during the season.

=== 1924 to 1930: Monroe Drillers / Cotton States League ===
Despite folding the season before the Cotton States League resumed play in 1924, playing as a six–team Class D level league. The Monroe Drillers joined the Brookhaven Truckers, Hattiesburg Hubman, Jackson Senators, Laurel Lumberjacks and Vicksburg Hill Billies teams in resuming league play on May 8, 1924.

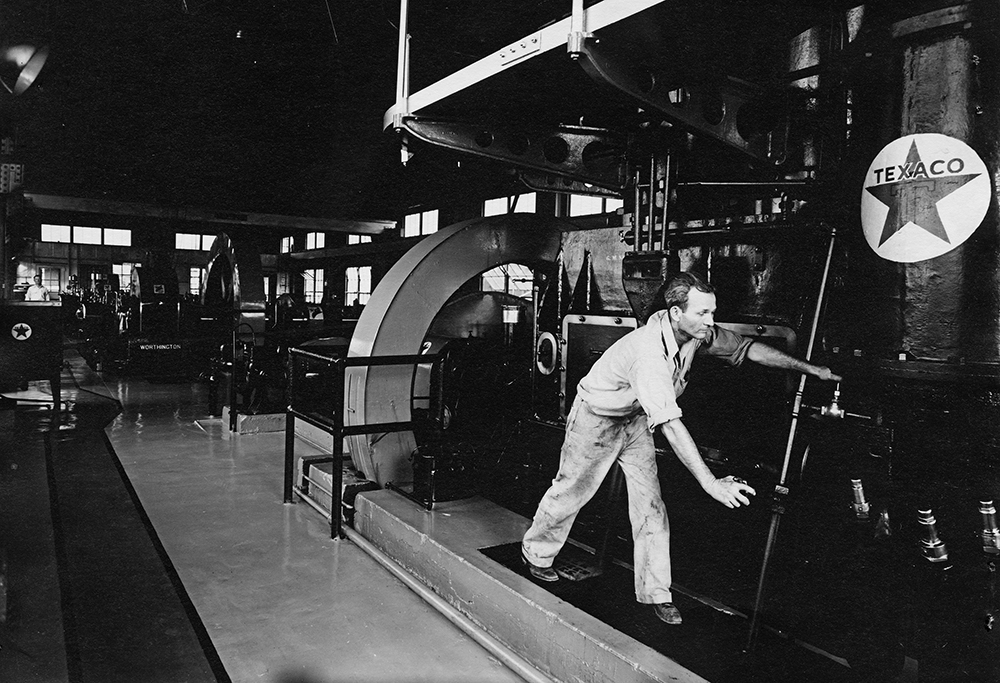
(1937) Life Magazine. Oil pumping. Monroe, Louisiana.

The "Drillers" nickname corresponds to local history and industry in Monroe, Louisiana. In 1916, a natural gas discovery well was drilled in Monroe and a large pool of natural gas was discovered. For a decade, the Monroe pool was considered the largest natural gas producer in the world. The pool was estimated to have contained more 6.5 trillion cubic feet of gas, stretching an area of nearly 500 square miles. To a lesser degree the natural gas drilling industry is still active in Monroe today.

The Monroe Drillers began Cotton States League play, as the league reduced to six teams for the 1924 season and Monroe finished in second place. The Monroe Drillers ended the season with an overall record of 59–39, placing second in the final regular season standings of the Class D level league. Managed by Pep Ripperton and Bill Wise, Monroe ended the season 5.5 games behind of the first place Hattiesburg Hubman in the Cotton States League final standings. The league played a split season schedule, but no playoffs were held as the Hattiesburg Hubman won both halves of the season schedule.

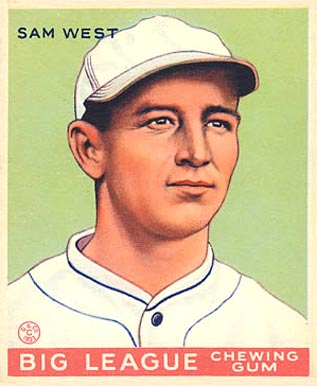
(1933) Sam West, St. Louis Browns, Goudey baseball card. West hit .341 playing for the Drillers in 1925. A four-time major league all-star, West played in the first 1933 Major League Baseball All-Star Game.

The 1925 Monroe Drillers continued play in the eight-team Cotton States League and ended the season with a sixth-place finish. The Drillers ended the season with a record of 56–65 to place sixth in the league standings, playing under returning managers Bill Wise and Paul Trammell. The Monroe Drillers finished 13.5 games behind the first place Meridian White Ribbons in the final Cotton States League final standings. The league played a split season schedule, and Monroe did not qualify for the play playoffs as the Jackson Senators won the first half and Meridian won the second half pennants before Meridian was swept by Jackson in the playoff final.

Sam West played for the Drillers in 1925. After hitting.341 in 23 games for Monroe, West ended the season with the Longview Cannibals of the East Texas League. West became a four-time major league all Star, including appearing in the first ever 1933 Major League Baseball All-Star Game. West had a lifetime batting average of.299 with a.377 OBP in his sixteen-season major league career. With the beginning of World War II, West joined the U.S. Army following the 1942 season and after his discharge in 1945, he never appeared in another

The Monroe Drillers ended the 1926 season in last place in the eight-team Cotton States League. Ending the season with a record of 56–72 to place eighth in the overall league standings, the Drillers finished 23.5 games behind the first place Hattiesburg Pinetoppers. Chick Carroll and Eddie Palmer managed Monroe in 1926. With their last place finish, Monroe did not qualify for the Cotton States League final. With the league utilizing a split season schedule, Hattiesburg won the first half pennant and The Vicksburg Hill Billies, who finished seventh in the overall final standings, won the second half pennant. No playoff final was held due to second half "irregularities." George Ferrell of Monroe led the Cotton States league with 20 home runs.

On Friday, August 13, 1926, Roy Spruell of the Hattiesburg Pinetoppers threw a no-hitter against the Monroe Drillers. Spruell did not issue a walk in the game, but his player/manager Herschel Bobo committed two errors playing shortstop. Both baserunners were eliminated due to two double plays and Spruell faced the minimum of 27 batters in the game.

The Monroe Drillers continued play in the eight-team, Class D level Cotton States League, finishing in second place in 1927. With a record of 74–48 in the final overall standings, the Drillers played the season under returning manager Eddie Palmer. With their second-place finish in the eight–team league, Monroe finished 1.5 games behind the first place Jackson Red Sox and qualified for the playoff final. The Monroe Drillers won the first half championship of the split season schedule and Jackson won the second half pennant qualifying both teams for the final. In the playoff final, Jackson swept Monroe in the final 4 games to 0 to win the championship. Joe Granade 180 hits. Pitcher Phil Hensiek of Monroe led the Cotton States League with a winning percentage of.759, compiling a record of 22–7. His teammate Joe Grande of Monroe had 180 total hits to lead the league.

In 1928, the Monroe Drillers placed fifth in the Cotton States League final regular season standings. Monroe placed sixth in the eight-team league final season standings with a record of 64–56, managed by the returning Eddie Palmer. The Drillers ended the season 12.0 games behind the first place Jackson Red Sox in the final overall standings. Monroe did not qualify for the playoff. In the split season schedule, the third place Hattiesburg Pinetoppers won the first half pennant, and the fourth place Vicksburg Hill Billies won the second half pennant. Vicksburg then defeated the Pinetoppers in the playoff final. Joe Granade of Monroe led the Cotton States League with both 96 runs scored and 174 total hits.

The 1929 Monroe Drillers continued their Class D level Cotton States League membership as both the Hattiesburg Pinetoppers and Meridian Mets franchises relocated during the season. The Monroe Drillers placed sixth in the eight–team league with a record of 55–63, playing the season under managers Art Ewoldt, John Kane and Tillie Metteer. The Drillers finished 16.0 games behind the first place Alexandria Reds. In the playoff final, the second place El Dorado Lions defeated the third place Jackson Senators, after each won a split season pennant. Joe Granade of Monroe won the league batting title, hitting.367. His Monroe teammate Odell Hale had 116 runs scored to lead the Cotton States League.

Monroe played their final season as the "Drillers" in 1930 and were the runner up in the eight-team Class D level Cotton States League final standings. The Drillers ended the season with a record of 67–61 and placed second in the final standings, managed by Jim Bagby and Clarence Huber. Monroe finished 13.0 games behind the first place El Dorado Lions in the final regular standings as the league ended the season with six teams. Monroe Did not qualify for the playoffs, as El Dorado and the Pine Bluff Judges won the pennants in the split season schedule. Pine Bluff won the final series. Dick Luckey, who split the Cotton States League season between the folded Alexandria Reds and Monroe, won the batting title, hitting.358.

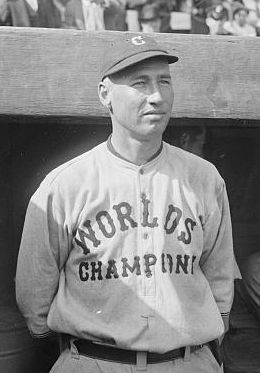
(1921) Jim Bagby Sr., Cleveland Indians. Bagby pitched and managed with Monroe in his final professional season in 1930 at age 40. He won 31 games for the 1920 World Series Champion Cleveland Indians.

In his final professional season at age 40, Jim Bagby Sr. pitched and managed for Monroe in 1930. A member of the Cleveland Guardians Hall of Fame, Bagby was the first pitcher to hit a home run in the World Series, which occurred in Game 5 the 1920 World Series. Bagby is one of the last pitchers to win over 30 games in one season, compiling a 31–12 record in 1920 for Cleveland, when he pitched 339 innings. Arm injuries after his 1920 season diminished his pitching successes and he retired for a time following the 1923 season. Following his playing career, Bagby became a minor league umpire before a stroke during a game in 1942 ended his umpiring career. His son Jim Bagby Jr. was an all-star pitcher for the Cleveland Indians. Bagby and his son became the first father-and-son combination to pitch in the World Series when Jim Jr. pitched for the Boston Red Sox in the 1946 World Series. Jim Bagby Sr. had a 4–1 record with a 2.15 ERA, pitching in 6 games and 48 innings for the 1930 Monroe Drillers.

Joe Martina pitched for Monroe in 1930 at age 40. In his only major league season at age 34, Martina had a 6–8 record with 14 starts and 8 complete games, He pitched a scoreless inning in Game 3 of the 1924 World Series for the World Series Champion Washington Senators, where he was on the pitching staff with Walter Johnson. Martina had a lengthy minor league career and won 322 games in 21 minor league seasons.

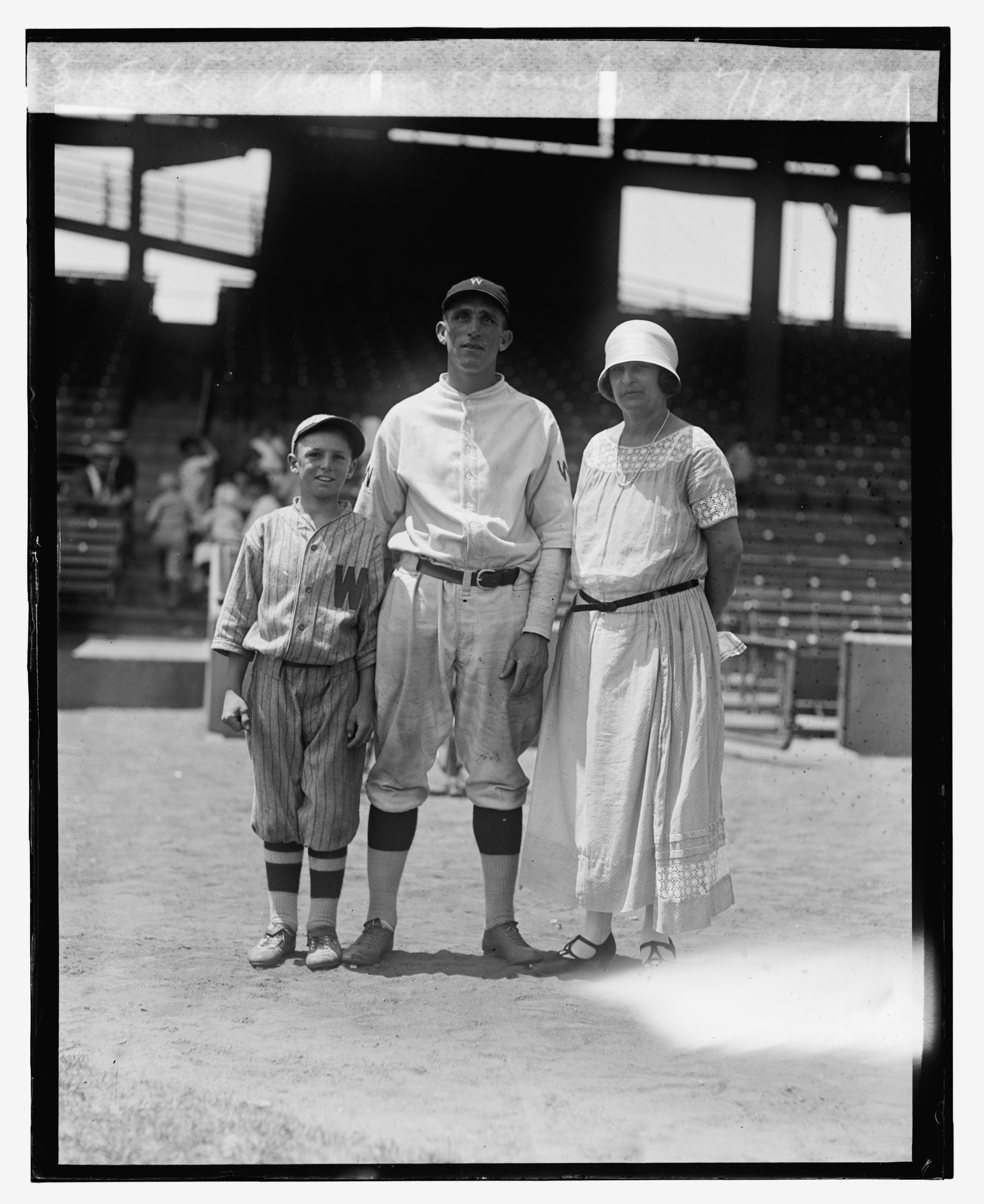
(1924) Joe Martina & family. Washington Senators. July 21, 1924. At age 40, Martina pitched for Monroe in 1930 en route to his 322 career minor league victories.

=== 1931 & 1932: Monroe Twins / Cotton States League ===
For the 1931 season Monroe began hosting minor league games at Casino Park, which was newly constructed. Monroe shared the ballpark with its owner, the Monroe Monarchs franchise. Monroe continued membership in the Cotton States League in 1931, becoming known as the Monroe "Twins". The Twins ended the season fifth place in the six-team league, which remained a Class D level league. The Alexandria Reds and Lake Charles Newporters did not return to the league in 1931 after folding the season before, reducing the league to six teams. With their fifth-place finish, the Twins had a final regular season record 30–66 and managed by Eddie Palmer, Ted Jourdan and Frank Meyers. Monroe ended the season 23.0 games behind the first place Jackson Senators. Monroe did not qualify for the playoff, where Jackson defeated the Vicksburg Hill Billies. Monroe pitcher Abe White led the Cotton States League with both 163 strikeouts and a 2.56 ERA.

The Monroe Twins became a minor league affiliate in 1932 and continued play in the Cotton States League, which folded during the season as the nation faced the Financial turmoil of The Great Depression. The Twins became a minor league affiliate of the St. Louis Cardinals and were in fifth place with a 30–37 record when the Cotton States folded On July 13, 1932, as minor league baseball struggled financially during the Great Depression. The Twins were managed during the season by Frank "Pop" Kitchens and finished 19.0 games behind the Baton Rouge Senators in the shortened season. The Cotton States League remained folded until the 1937 season.

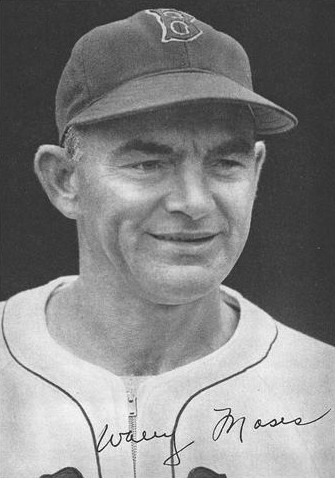
(1947) Wally Moses, Boston Red Sox. A 2-time major league All-Star, Moses played for Monroe in 1932

A member of the Philadelphia Baseball Wall of Fame, Wally Moses played for Monroe in 1932 at age 21. Moses became two-time major-league all-star in his major league career spanning from 1935 to 1951. Playing the majority of his career with the Philadelphia Athletics, Moses played 17 total major league seasons and retired with 2138 hits and a.292 average and.368 OBA. Following his playing career, Moses became a coach for the Philadelphia Athletics from 1952 to 1954, the A's final three seasons in Philadelphia. He then remained in Philadelphia and coached with the Philadelphia Phillies from 1955 to 1958. He continued as a coach with the Cincinnati Reds (1959–60), New York Yankees (1961–62; 1966) and Detroit Tigers (1967–70). Moses coached with world series champion teams in 1961, 1962 and 1967. Moses hit.284 in 67 games for Monroe in 1932.

=== 1937: Return to Cotton States League ===
Monroe, Louisiana next hosted minor league play when the Monroe Twins resumed play in the 1937 season as members of the Cotton States League, which returned to play as a Class C level league. After folding following the 1932 season, the Cotton States League had reformed as an eight-team league in 1936. Monroe replaced the Cleveland A's in the 1937 league. On April 21, 1937, the Twins joined the Clarksdale Red Sox (Boston Red Sox affiliate), El Dorado Lions (Cincinnati Reds), Greenville Bucks, Greenwood Giants (New York Giants), Helena Seaporters, Pine Bluff Judges (St. Louis Cardinals) and Vicksburg Hill Billies (Chicago White Sox) teams in beginning Cotton States League play.

In his first professional season, Gordon Houston played for Monroe in 1937. Houston is remembered as the first player in Organized Baseball to die during active duty in World War II. Gordon and his brother both C.L. both played for Monroe in 1937 after receiving their first professional contracts from the Monroe Twins for the 1937 season. Gordon Houston batted.320 and slugged.417 in 46 games while playing at shortstop; His brother C. L. played at center field and batted.315 in 21 games.

Both brothers were active with the United States Army Air Corp. After the attack on Pearl Harbor in December 1941, Gordon Houston assumed his position as flight leader with the 55th Pursuit Group stationed at McChord Field in Tacoma, Washington, the headquarters of the GHQ Air Force Northwest Air District. As a second lieutenant, Houston lead his flight patrolling the coast, looking for Japanese military presence in that region. On February 10, 1942, Houston was killed while landing his plane after a mission, hitting a ditch while avoiding another plane that was landing. Houston died instantly.

In their return to Cotton States League play, the 1937 Monroe Twins finished in last in the eight-team league. With a final record of 53–85, the Twins ended the season in eighth place, playing the season under managers Ed Hock, Walt Butler and Buford Rhea. The Monroe Twins finished ended the season 34.0 games behind the first place Pine Bluff Judges in the final regular season standings. With their last place finish, Monroe did not qualify for the four-team playoffs, won by the El Dorado Lions. As their tenure of league play continued, the Monroe team continued Class C level Cotton States League play in 1938, becoming known as the "White Sox".

=== 1938 to 1941: Monroe White Sox / Two Cotton States League championships ===
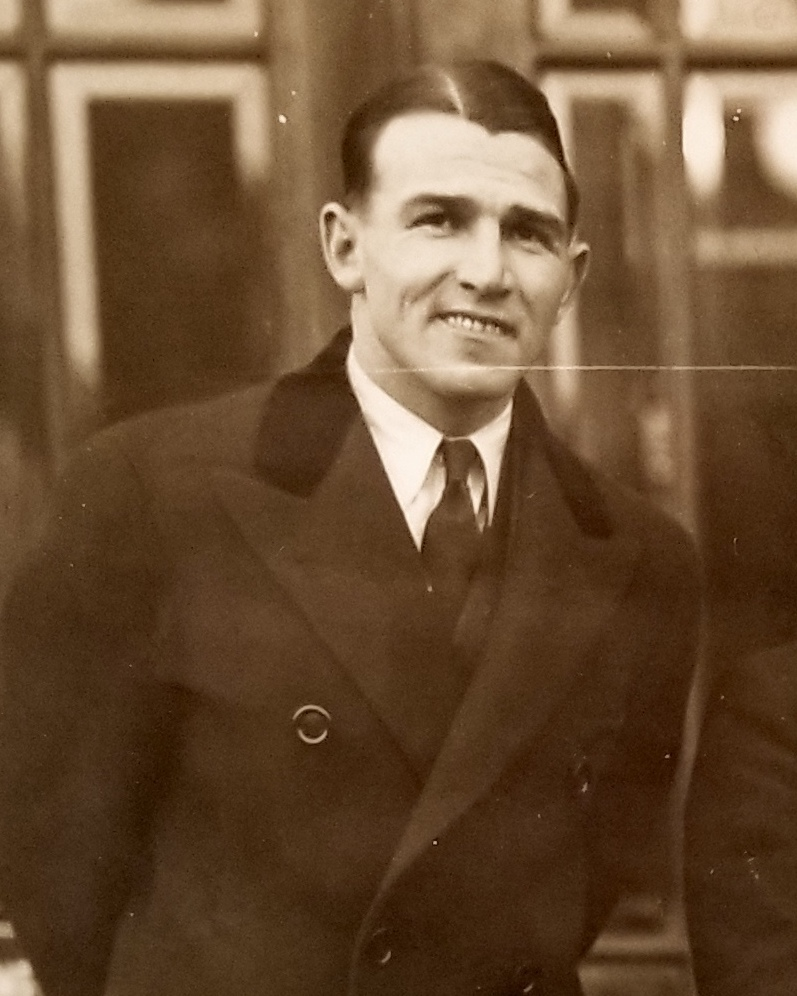
(1929) Doug Taitt. Taitt was the player-manager for the Monroe White Sox from 1938 to 1941. He led the team to three consecutive league pennants and two league championships.

In the 1938 season, Monroe continued play in the eight-team, Class C level Cotton States League with their new nickname and the team went from a last place finish in the previous season to becoming league the Cotton States League champions. The Monroe "White Sox" compiled an overall record of 78–60 and ended the season in third place, playing the Cotton States League season under managers Luther Harvel and Doug Taitt. With his hiring, Taitt began a four-year tenure as manager after having begun the 1938 season as a player with the Shreveport Sports in the Texas League.

The 1938 White Sox finished 10.0 games behind the first place Greenville Bucks in the regular standings and qualified for the four-team playoffs with their third-place finish. With their playoff performance, the Monroe White Sox became League Champions. In the semifinals, Monroe defeated the Helena Seaporters 3 games to 1. In the final, the White Sox won the championship when they defeated the pennant winning Greenville Bucks 4 games to 2. After joining the team at age 35, Monroe player/manager Doug Tait hit .358 with a .483 OBP while appearing in 68 games for the White Sox. Buford Rhea led the Cotton States League with 79 stolen bases. Monroe pitcher Tom Perry led the Cotton States League with both a 1.71 ERA and a 17–2 record.

Doug Tait had been in the major leagues from 1928 to 1932, playing with the Boston Red Sox, Chicago White Sox and Philadelphia Phillies.

The 1939 Monroe White Sox defended their Cotton States League championship the season before by winning the league pennant. In the eight-team league, Monroe ended the regular season with a record of 92–46, finishing in first place, managed by the returning Doug Taitt. The White Sox won league pennant in finishing 16.0 games ahead of the second place Clarksdale Red Sox in the final regular season standings. In the playoffs, the White Sox lost in first round 3 games to 2 to the Hot Springs Bathers, a Detroit Tigers affiliate. The Greenwood Crackers defeated Hot Springs in the final. Player/manager Doug Taitt hit .329 for Monroe with 9 home runs and 75 RBI while playing in 111 games. Monroe pitcher John Yelovic won 21 games to lead the Coton States League, while his teammate Kelton Maxfield had a record of 16–4 to top the league with a .800 winning percentage.

Jake Jones played for Monroe in 1939. His major league career was interrupted by his military service with the U.S. Navy during World War II. in his service, Jones was awarded with two Distinguished Flying Crosses, four Air Medals and the Silver Star. In battle, Jones hot down seven Japanese planes and sunk a number of Japanese ships. He was one of the most highly decorated baseball players serving during World War II.

Monroe continued play in the 1940 Cotton States League and the White Sox won their second consecutive league pennant and their second Cotton States League championship. Monroe ended the regular season with a record of 82–45 winning their second consecutive pennant with a first-place finish under returning player/manager Doug Taitt. The White Sox finished 8.0 games ahead of the second place El Dorado Lions in the final regular season standings in the eight-team Class C level league. In the Cotton States League playoffs, Monroe defeated the Greenville Buckshots 3 games to 1 in the semi-final. In the final, Monroe won the league championship by defeating El Dorado 4 games to 1. to claim their second title in three seasons. Pitcher Tom Perry of Monroe won 21 games to lead the Cotton States League.

(1955) Dave Philley, Baltimore Orioles. Holding his team "Most Valuable Player" trophy. Philley played for Monroe in 1941, before making his major league debut later in the season.

In their final season known as the Monroe "White Sox," Monroe won their third consecutive Cotton States League pennant in 1941. The White Sox won the pennant in 1941, with a first-place finish in the eight-team league, compiling a final regular season record of 83–55, playing under returning manager Doug Taitt. In the Class C level league, Monroe finished 5.5 games ahead of the second place Hot Springs Bathers in the regular season standings. In the four-team playoffs, Monroe was unable to defend their league championship as the lost to the Vicksburg Hill Billies 3 games to 2 in the first round. Hot Springs won the league championship by sweeping Vicksburg in the final. Monroe pitcher Bill Reeder had 189 strikeouts to lead the Cotton States League.

Dave Philley played for the 1941 Monroe White Sox in their final partial season before embarking on a lengthy major league career. Following his tenure with Monroe, Philley made his major league debut with the Chicago White Sox at the end of the 1941 season. Philley then served in the U.S. Army during World War II from 1942 until his discharge in 1946. After his military service, Philley resumed play in the major leagues until his final season with the 1962 Boston Red Sox.

The Cotton States League folded following the 1941 season. The league returned to play in 1947 without a Monroe franchise. Monroe rejoined the league in 1950, when the Monroe Sports began Monroe's final tenure six-year tenure as members of the Cotton States League before the leagues' demise in 1955.

== The ballparks ==
The Monroe Drillers and earlier Monroe teams hosted minor league home games at Forsythe Park through the 1930 season. The site was first called City Park and is within the Monroe Residential Historic District that is listed on the National Register of Historic Places. Besides hosting games, baseball teams trained at the site in the era and utilized the adjacent pool that continued natural spring water. The pool was relocated in the 1930s and the park was reconfigured. Today, the 53-acre Forsythe Park is still in use as a public park with amenities. It is located at 2300 Sycamore in Monroe, Louisiana.

In 1931, the Monroe Twins began play at Casino Park. The ballpark construction was financed by Fred Stovall, the owner of the Stovall Drilling Company and other businesses. The Twins shared the ballpark with the Monroe Monarchs team of the 1931 Texas–Louisiana Negro League and 1932 Negro Southern League, which was owned by Stovall. The ballpark had field dimensions of 360 feet in left, 450 feet in center and 330 feet in right. Casino Park itself also housed a swimming pool and a dance pavilion in addition to the ballpark. Admission to the ballpark was .25 cents and .50 cents. In the era, Casino Park was located at De Siard Street & South 29th Street, at the Missouri Pacific RR tracks, near the site of where Carroll High School is located today in Monroe. Carroll High School is located at 2939 Renwick Street in Monroe, Louisiana. Today, there is an historical marker for the Monroe Monarchs located near the former ballpark site.

== Timeline ==
Year(s)	# Yrs.	Team	Level	League	Affiliate	Ballpark
1924–1930	7	Monroe Drillers	Class D	Cotton States League	None	Forsythe Park
1931	1	Monroe Twins	Class D	Cotton States League	None	Forsythe Park
1932	1	Monroe Twins	Class D	Cotton States League	St. Louis Cardinals	Casino Park
1937	1	Monroe Twins	Class C	Cotton States League	None	Casino Park
1938–1941	4	Monroe White Sox	Class C	Cotton States League	None	Casino Park

== Year–by–year records ==
Year	Record	Finish	Manager	Playoffs/Notes
1924	59–39	2nd	Pep Ripperton / Bill Wise	No playoffs held
1925	56–65	6th	Bill Wise / Paul Trammell	Did not qualify
1926	56–72	8th	Chick Carroll / Eddie Palmer	No playoffs held
1927	74–48	2nd	Eddie Palmer	Won first half pennant Lost in finals
1928	64–56	5th	Eddie Palmer	Did not qualify
1929	55–63	6th	Art Ewoldt / Tillie Metteer; John Kane	Did not qualify
1930	67–61	2nd	Jim Bagby / Clarence Huber	Did not qualify
1931	30–66	5th	Eddie Palmer / Ted Jourdan; Frank Meyers	Did not qualify
1932	30–37	5th	Frank "Pop" Kitchens	League disbanded July 13
1937	53–85	8th	Ed Hock / Walt Butler; Buford Rhea	Did not qualify
1938	78–60	3rd	Luther Harvel / Doug Taitt	League champions
1939	92–46	1st	Doug Taitt	Won league pennant Lost in 1st round
1940	82–45	1st	Doug Taitt	Won league pennant League champions
1941	83–55	1st	Doug Taitt	Won league pennant Lost in 1st round

== Notable alumni ==
- Jim Bagby Sr. (1930)
- Bill Bagwell (1928, 1930)
- Bill Baker (1932)
- Josh Billings (1931)
- Dan Boone (1925)
- Red Borom (1937)
- Charlie Bowles (1940–1941)
- Gilly Campbell (1926–1928)
- Chick Carroll (1926, MGR)
- Lou Chiozza (1931)
- Bill Crouch (1932)
- Art Ewoldt (1929, MGR)
- Curt Fullerton (1938)
- Roy Graham (1927–1928)
- Marv Gudat (1926)
- Luther Harvel (1938. MGR)
- Phil Hensiek (1926–1927)
- Ed Hock (1937, MGR)
- Clarence Huber (1930, MGR)
- Gordon Houston (1937)
- Fred Johnson (1941)
- Jake Jones (1939)
- Ted Jourdan (1931, MGR)
- John Kane (1929, MGR)
- Cactus Keck (1927)
- Gus Ketchum (1950)
- Johnny Lanning (1932)
- Tex McDonald (1925)
- Hersh Martin (1932)
- Joe Martina (1930)
- Rufus Meadows (1927–1928, 1930)
- Dee Miles (1932)
- Wally Moses (1932) 2x MLB All-Star
- Tom Oliver (1924)
- Eddie Palmer (1926–1928, MGR)
- Dave Philley (1941)
- Tony Piet (1929)
- Bill Reeder (1941)
- Jackie Reid (1932)
- Culley Rikard (1937)
- Les Rock (1938)
- Floyd Speer (1939–1940)
- Doug Taitt (1938–1941, MGR)
- Ira Townsend (1925)
- Sam West (1925) 4x MLB All-Star
- Abe White (1931)

== See also ==
- Monroe Drillers players
- Monroe Twins players
- Monroe White Sox players
