= Cleveland A's =

- 1936; (1935-1936); Cleveland, Mississippi

Minor league affiliations
- Class: Class C (1935); Class D (1936)
- League: East Dixie League (1935); Cotton States League (1936)

Major league affiliations
- Team: Philadelphia Athletics (1936)

Minor league titles
- League titles (0): None
- Wild card berths (0): None

Team data
- Name: Cleveland Bengals (1935); Cleveland A's (1936)
- Ballpark: Boyle Park (1935–1936)

The Cleveland A's (or the interchangeable "Athletics") were a minor league baseball team based in Cleveland, Mississippi. In 1935, the Cleveland "Bengals" played a partial season as members of the Class C level East Dixie League. After the East Dixie League folded, the newly named Cleveland franchise joined the 1936 Class D level Cotton States League, as a minor league affiliate of the Philadelphia Athletics, adopting the "A's" nickname.

The Cleveland teams hosted home minor league games exclusively at Boyle Park in Cleveland.

== History ==
Cleveland, Mississippi first hosted minor league baseball in 1935, when the Cleveland Bengals played briefly as members of the eight–team Class C level East Dixie League. On June 18, 1935, the Columbus Bengals moved to Cleveland, Mississippi with a record of 36–41 at the time of the move. After compiling a 28–32 record while based in Cleveland, the team placed sixth in the final standings with an overall record of 64–73, playing the season under manager Henry "Slim" Brewer. The Columbus/Cleveland Bengals finished 19.5 games behind the first place Pine Bluff Judges in the final standings. Bengals player Fred Williams led the East Dixie League with 187 total hits.

The East Dixie League permanently folded following the 1935 season and Cleveland continued minor league play in a new league.

In 1936, Cleveland continued minor league play, when the A's became members of the eight–team Class D level Cotton States League, playing as a minor league affiliate of the Philadelphia Athletics and adopting the nickname. The Clarksdale Ginners, El Dorado Lions, Greenville Bucks, Greenwood Giants, Helena Seaporters, Jackson Senators and Pine Bluff Judges joined Cleveland in beginning league play on April 22, 1936.

The A's ended the 1936 regular season in seventh place in the Cotton States League. With Henry Brewer returning as manager, Cleveland ended the season with a 57–80 record and finished 20.5 games behind the first place Greenwood Chiefs in the final Cotton States League standings. The A's were also managed for part of the season by Mays Copeland and did not qualify for the post season playoffs won by El Dorado.

After drawing 8,600 total fans in 1935, the Cleveland franchise did not return to play in the 1837 Cotton States league Cleveland, Mississippi has not hosted another minor league team.

== The ballparks ==
Cleveland hosted minor league home games at Boyle Park. The ballpark had dimensions of (Left, Center, Right): 375–500–375.

== Timeline ==
Year(s)	# Yrs.	Team	Level	League	Affiliate	Ballpark
1935	1	Cleveland Bengals	Class C	East Dixie League	None	Boyle Park
1936	1	Cleveland A's	Class D	Cotton States League	Philadelphia Athletics	Boyle Park

== Year–by–year records ==
Year	Record	Finish	Manager	Playoffs
1935	64–73	6th	Henry Brewer	Columbus (36–41) moved to Cleveland June 18
1936	57–80	7th	Henry Brewer / Mays Copeland	Did not qualify

== Notable alumni ==
- Cecil Bolton (1936)
- Red Borom (1936)
- Mays Copeland (1936, MGR)
- Sherman Edwards (1936)
- Bill Nagel (1935)
- Culley Rikard (1935–1936)
- Fred Williams (1935)

== See also ==
- Cleveland Bengals players
- Cleveland A's players
