= Columbus Discoverers =

- 1907–1908; (1907–1908, 1912–1913, 1935); Columbus, Mississippi

Minor league affiliations
- Class: Class D (1907–1908, 1912–1913); Class C (1935)
- League: Cotton States League (1907–1908, 1912–1913); East Dixie League (1935)

Major league affiliations
- Team: None

Minor league titles
- League titles (0): None
- Conference titles (0): None

Team data
- Name: Columbus Discoverers (1907–1908); Columbus Joy Riders (1912–1913); Columbus Bengals (1935)
- Ballpark: Fairgrounds Park (1907–1908, 1912–1913, 1935)

The Columbus Discoverers were a minor league baseball team based in Columbus, Mississippi. The Columbus "Discoverers" and "Joy Riders" teams played as members of the Cotton States League from 1907 to 1908 and 1912 to 1913.

The 1935 Columbus "Bengals" played a partial season as members of the East Dixie League.

The Columbus teams hosted home minor league games exclusively at Fairgrounds Park.

== History ==
=== Cotton States League - 1907 & 1908, 1912 & 1913 ===
Columbus, Mississippi first hosted minor league baseball in 1907. The Columbus "Discoverers" became members of the six–team Class D level Cotton States League. The Gulfport Crabs, Jackson Senators, Meridian White Ribbons, Mobile Sea Gulls and Vicksburg Hill Billies joined Columbus in 1907 league play.

The 1907 Columbus Discoverers finished last in their first season of play. The Discoverers ended the season with a record of 42–96 to place sixth in the final standings. Managed by Jack Law, Columbus finished 42.5 games behind the first place Mobile Sea Gulls in the final standings, as the Cotton States League had no playoffs.

The Columbus Discoverers continued Cotton States League play in 1908. In their first season of play, the Discoverers ended the season in fourth place with a final record of 58–56. Managed by Billy May, Louis Hall, Ace Stewart and Jack Toft, Columbus finished 12.0 games behind the first place Jackson Senators in the final standings of the six–team league. Pitcher Al Demaree of Columbus led the Cotton States League with 23 wins. Following the 1908 season, the Cotton States League did not play in 1909, before returning to play in 1910 without a Columbus franchise in the league.

In 1912, Columbus rejoined the six–team Class D level Cotton States League during the season and placed fourth. The Columbus "Joy Riders" began play when the Hattiesburg Timberjacks franchise moved to Columbus, Mississippi on June 5, 1912, with a record of 19–24. Compiling a 37–35 record while based in Columbus, the team finished with an overall record of 56–59, playing under manager Carlos Smith in both locations. The Hattiesburg/Columbus team finished 13.5 games behind the first place Vicksburg Hill Billies in the final standings. Pitcher Walt Kinney of Columbus led the Cotton States League with 22 wins.

On June 11, 1912, Columbus played a double header against the Yazoo City Zoos. Reportedly, the Columbus catcher was injured in the second inning of the first game and the Joy Riders did not have another player available to play catcher. Taylor, the catcher for Yazoo City then volunteered to play catcher for both teams in order for the games to be played. Yazoo City was noted to have won both games, with Taylor catching 32 total innings behind the plate.

The Columbus Joy Riders continued play in the 1913 Cotton States League. The Joy Riders ended the 1913 season in fourth place with a record of 40–57, playing under manager Bob Kennedy in Columbus' final season of Cotton League play. The Joy Riders finished 32.0 games behind the first place Jackson Lawmakers. Pitcher Ed Poole of Columbus led the league with 163 strikeouts. The Cotton States League shortened their season to August 15, 1913 and did not return to play in 1914, due to World War I.

=== East Dixie League - 1935 ===
In 1935, Minor league baseball briefly returned to Columbus, Mississippi for a partial final season. The Columbus "Bengals" briefly played as members of the eight–team Class C level East Dixie League before relocating. On June 18, 1935, the Columbus Bengals moved to Cleveland, Mississippi. The Bengals relocated with a record of 36–41 at the time of their move to Cleveland. After compiling a 28–32 record based in Cleveland, the Cleveland Bengals team placed sixth in the final standings under manager Slim Brewer, with a 64–73 overall record. Columbus/Cleveland finished 19.5 games behind the first place Pine Bluff Judges in the final standings. The East Dixie League permanently folded following the 1935 season.

Columbus, Mississippi has not hosted another minor league team.

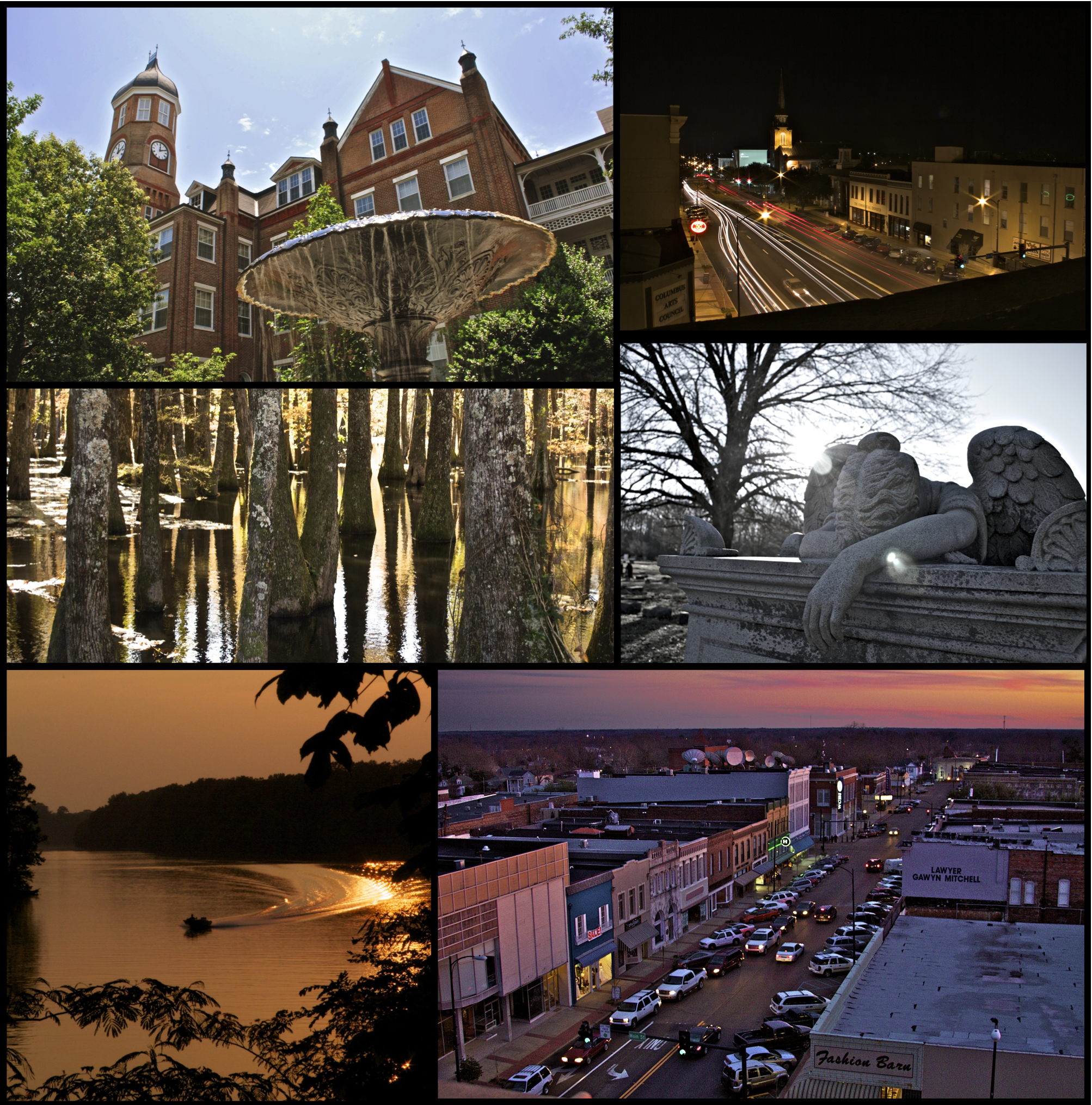
(2011) Images. Columbus, Mississippi

== The ballpark ==
In 1907, Columbus ball field was located in "Lake Park" owned by the "Street & Railway Company". (After the Street Car line closed (1920), the park was sold to the Fairgrounds.) The Columbus minor league teams hosted their home games at the Fairgrounds Park in Columbus. Today, the old Columbus Fairgrounds are still in use as a public city park & ball fields now owned by the city of Columbus Parks & Recreation. (under a new name) Propst Park is located in East Columbus at Hwy 182 East Columbus.

== Timeline ==
Year(s)	# Yrs.	Team	Level	League	Ballpark
1907–1908	2	Columbus Discoverers	Class D	Cotton States League	Fairgrounds Park
1912–1913	2	Columbus Joy Riders	Class D	Cotton States League	Fairgrounds Park
1935	1	Columbus Bengals	Class C	East Dixie League	Fairgrounds Park

== Year-by-year records ==
Year	Record	Finish	Manager	Playoffs
1907	42–96	6th	Jack Law	No playoffs held
1908	58–56	4th	Billy May / Louis Hall; Ace Stewart /Jack Toft	No playoffs held
1912	56–59	4th	Carlos Smith	Hattiesburg (19–24) moved to Columbus June 5
1913	40–57	4th	Bob Kennedy	Season ended August 15
1935	64–73	6th	Slim Brewer	Columbus (36–41) moved to Cleveland June 18

== Notable alumni ==
- Mack Allison (1908)
- Orth Collins (1907)
- Al Demaree (1908)
- Billy Kinloch (1907)
- Frank Manush (1907–1908)
- Ken Penner (1913)
- Phil Redding (1912)
- Culley Rikard (1935)
- Dolly Stark (1907)
- Ace Stewart (1907; 1908, MGR)
- Ollie Welf (1912)
- Fred Williams (1935)

== See also ==
- Columbus Discoverers players
- Columbus Bengals players
- Columbus Joy Riders players
