= East Dixie League =

- Formerly: Dixie League
- Classification: Class C (1934–1935)
- Sport: Minor League Baseball
- First season: 1934
- Folded: 1935
- Replaced by: Cotton States League
- President: J. Alvin Gardner (1934–1935)
- No. of teams: 10
- Country: United States of America
- Most titles: 1 Jackson Mississippians (1934); Pine Bluff Judges (1935)
- Related competitions: West Dixie League

The East Dixie League was an American professional minor league baseball league that operated for two seasons from 1934 to 1935 as a Class C level league.

== History ==
The East Dixie League was created when the Dixie League split up into the East Dixie League and West Dixie League in 1934. Eleven cities were represented in the league; three were in Arkansas, two were in Louisiana, and six were in Mississippi. J. Alvin Gardner served as league president as the Jackson Mississippians won the 1934 championship and the Pine Bluff Judges won in 1935. The East Dixie League played two seasons as a Class C level league then became the Cotton States League.

== Cities represented 1934-1935 ==
- Baton Rouge, LA: Baton Rouge Red Sticks 1934
- Clarksdale, MS: Clarksdale Ginners 1934–1935
- Cleveland, MS: Cleveland Bengals 1935
- Columbus, MS: Columbus Bengals 1935
- El Dorado, AR: El Dorado Lions 1934–1935
- Greenville, MS: Greenville Buckshots 1934–1935
- Greenwood, MS: Greenwood Chiefs 1934–1935
- Helena, AR: Helena Seaporters 1935
- Jackson, MS: Jackson Mississippians 1934–1935
- Pine Bluff, AR: Pine Bluff Judges 1934–1935
- Shreveport, LA: Shreveport Sports 1934

== Standings & statistics ==
=== 1934 East Dixie League ===
schedule

Team standings	W	L	PCT	GB	Managers
Pine Bluff Judges	79	48	.622	–	Lena Styles
Jackson Mississippians	72	54	.571	6½	Guy Lacy
Greenville Buckshots	70	58	.547	9½	Bill Eisemann / Frank Brazill
El Dorado Lions	58	71	.450	22	George Harper
Shreveport Sports / Greenwood Chiefs	57	70	.449	22	Jerry Mallett / Slim Brewer
Baton Rouge Red Sticks / Clarksdale Ginners	47	82	.364	33	Josh Billings

Baton Rouge (19–29) moved to Clarksdale June 11; Shreveport moved to Greenwood July 13
Playoffs: Jackson 4 games, Greenville 2.

Player statistics
Player	Team	Stat	Tot	Player	Team	Stat	Tot
Leslie Horn	Greenville	BA	.364	Hugo Klaerner	Pine Bluff	W	24
Joe Valenti	El Dorado	Runs	100	Hugo Klaerner	Pine Bluff	SO	172
Leslie Horn	Greenville	Hits	182	George Mills	Baton Rouge	ERA	1.89
Hugh Ferrell	Jackson	RBI	95	Hugo Klaerner	Pine Bluff	PCT	.774 24–7
Cecil Bolton	Greenville	HR	19				

=== 1935 East Dixie League ===
schedule

Team standings	W	L	PCT	GB	Managers
Pine Bluff Judges	84	54	.609	–	Lena Styles
El Dorado Lions	80	57	.584	3½	George Harper / Wray Query
Jackson Mississippians	72	64	.529	11	Herschel Bobo / Guy Lacy
Greenville Buckshots	71	68	.511	13½	Glen Bolton / Tommy Taylor
Helena Seaporters	66	70	.485	17	Rod Whitney
Columbus Bengals / Cleveland Bengals	64	73	.467	19½	Slim Brewer
Clarksdale Ginners	60	79	.432	24½	Harry Strohm
Greenwood Chiefs	52	84	.382	31	Clay Hopper

Columbus (28–32) moved to Cleveland June 18
Playoffs: Pine Bluff 4 games, Jackson 0.

Player statistics
Player	Team	Stat	Tot	Player	Team	Stat	Tot
Allen Hunt	El Dorado	BA	.363	Harold Ginn	El Dorado	W	21
Cliff Greer	El Dorado	Runs	117	Harold Ginn	El Dorado	SO	162
Fred Williams	Colum/Cleve	Hits	187	Zach Schuessler	Helena	ERA	2.61
Milt Stroner	El Dorado	RBI	128	Harrold Ginn	El Dorado	PCT	.750 21–7
Earl Nelson	Greenville	HR	28				
