= Fred Williams (first baseman) =

American baseball player (1913–1993)

- First baseman
- Born: July 17, 1913; Meridian, Mississippi, U.S.
- Died: November 2, 1993 (aged 80); Meridian, Mississippi, U.S.
- Batted: Right Threw: Right

MLB debut
- April 19, 1945, for the Cleveland Indians

Last MLB appearance
- July 8, 1945, for the Cleveland Indians

MLB statistics
- Games played: 16
- At bats: 19
- Hits: 4
- Stats at Baseball Reference

Teams
- Cleveland Indians (1945)

Fred "Pap" Williams (July 17, 1913 – November 2, 1993), also listed as Pappy Williams in contemporary reports and Papa Williams in secondary sources, was an American professional baseball first baseman and manager whose career spanned from 1935 to 1955. In 1945, Williams made 16 appearances for the Cleveland Indians of Major League Baseball. He totaled four hits in 19 at-bats, with one walk. Williams batted and threw right-handed.

== Early professional career ==
Williams played baseball, basketball and football at Meridian High School in Meridian, Mississippi.

After graduating in 1934, he made his professional baseball debut for the Columbus/Cleveland Bengals of the East Dixie League in 1935, where he finished the season with a .338 batting average. In March 1936, he was sold to the Memphis Chickasaws of the Southern Association for Mays Copeland, Culley Rikard, Thomas Swayze and cash considerations. He was sent to the Chicks' Cotton States League affiliate the Greenville Bucks, where he batted .333 with 105 runs batted in. For the start of the 1937 season, Williams was optioned to the Meridian Scrappers of the Southeastern League. In August, he was recalled to Memphis after the Southeastern League season ended. He finished the year tied for the Southeastern League lead in hits, with 163. In December, he was transferred to the Savannah Indians in the South Atlantic League. He split 1938 with Savannah, Meridian and the Greenville Spinners before being returned to Savannah in August. In early August 1939, he was acquired by the Greenwood Crackers of the Cotton States League, but was granted his release on August 9 while suffering a foot injury.

== Work as a player-manager ==
On February 24, 1940, Williams signed with the Grand Forks Chiefs of the Northern League as a player-manager. After batting .320 and managing the club to the Northern League championship, he was sold to the Winnipeg Maroons in March 1941 where he was continued as player-manager. He also appeared as a pitcher 11 times, playing the position for the first time in his professional career.

He left organized baseball after the 1941 season, playing for the Moss Specials of Meridian in 1943 and coaching an American Legion club from Meridian in 1944.

== Cleveland Indians ==
Williams was signed by the Cleveland Indians in March 1945. He made his major league debut on April 19 against the Chicago White Sox, pinch hitting and failing to reach base in the eighth inning.

Following his debut, he left to the club to undergo pre-military conscription physical tests in Memphis, Tennessee. According to Williams, both U.S. Army and Navy doctors had turned him away for service in World War II. He returned to the club on May 4. In total, Williams appeared in 16 games for Cleveland, totaling four hits and walking once. He played first base in three games, while appearing as a pinch hitter in the remaining 13 contests.

== Return to the minor leagues ==
In July 1945, he was optioned to the Wilkes-Barre Barons of the Eastern League. He returned to the Southeastern League with the Meridian Peps in March 1946 and was named manager on July 30. He returned to the club as a player for 1947, with Roxie Lawson taking over as manager. He batted .321 in 1946 and .300 in 1947, driving in 97 and 100 runs in those seasons. On March 26, 1948, Williams was released by Meridian. He started the 1948 season for the Kinston Eagles of the Coastal Plain League and moved to the Rocky Mount Leafs during the last month of the year. He ended the season with a .364 batting average. Williams then signed as player-manager for the Greenville Greenies for 1949. He spent the 1950 season as the first baseman for the West Texas–New Mexico League's Borger Gassers, hitting .369. In March 1951, he was named player-manager of the Waycross Bears in the Georgia–Florida League. He led the team in hits and runs batted in and batted .465 in the postseason. Williams returned to Waycross in the same capacity in 1952.

In 1953, Williams returned to his roll as manager of an American Legion club in Meridian, leading the team to the state playoffs. Williams was named played-manager of the Crestview Braves in the Alabama-Florida League in March 1954, where he batted .403, drove in 111 runs and stole 44 bases at age 40. By March 1955, he was named manager of the Vicksburg Hill Billies in a return to the Cotton States League. He played in 90 games and finished with a .337 batting average in his final season as a professional.

Williams worked as an offseason baseball instructor in Mississippi for the Milwaukee Braves in 1957.
