= Crestview Braves =

- 1954–1956; Crestview, Florida

Minor league affiliations
- Class: Class D (1954–1956)
- League: Alabama-Florida League (1954–1956)

Major league affiliations
- Team: Chicago Cubs (1956)

Minor league titles
- League titles (0): None
- Wild card berths (1): 1955

Team data
- Name: Crestview Braves (1954–1956)
- Ballpark: Richbourg Field (1954–1956)

The Crestview Braves were a minor league baseball team based in Crestview, Florida. From 1954 to 1956, the Crestview Braves teams played exclusively as members of the Alabama-Florida League while hosting minor league home games at Richbourg Field. The 1956 Crestview Braves played the season as a minor league affiliate of the Chicago Cubs.

== History ==
Minor league baseball in Crestview, Florida began in the 1954 season. The Crestview "Braves" became members of the six–team Class D level Alabama-Florida League. The Andalusia-Opp Indians, Dothan Rebels, Fort Walton Beach Jets, Graceville Oilers and Panama City Fliers joined Crestview in the league, beginning play on April 15, 1954.

In their first season of play, the Crestview Braves did not qualify for the 1954 Alabama–Florida League playoffs. With a record of 55–59, playing under manager Fred Williams, the Braved placed fifth and finished 16.5 games the first place Dothan Rebels in the final regular season standings. Crestview did not qualify for the playoffs, won by the Graceville Oilers. Neal Cobb of Crestview won the Alabama–Florida League batting title, hitting .432, with a league leading 188 hits.

In 1955 Alabama–Florida League play, the Crestview Braves advanced to the finals in the six–team league playoffs. The Braves ended the regular season with a 54–66 record, playing under manager Nesbit Wilson and placed fourth, qualifying for the four–team playoffs. Crestview finished 19.0 games behind the first place Panama City Fliers in the final Alabama–Florida League regular season standings. In the playoffs, the Braves defeated the Fort Walton Beach Jets 4 games to 1 to advance. In the Finals, the Panama City Fliers won the championship by defeating Crestview 3 games 1. Crestview player/manager Nesbit Wilson hit .403 to lead the Alabama–Florida League in hitting, while teammate Jeff Wadkins won 20 games to lead the league.

Crestview played their final minor league season in 1956, becoming a minor league affiliate of the Chicago Cubs and keeping their "Braves" nickname. The Crestview Braves placed fifth in the six–team Alabama–Florida League final standings. With an overall record of 51–59, playing under manager Walt Dixon, Crestview ended their final season 19.0 games behind the first place Graceville Oilers in the league standings. Crestview did not qualify for the four–team playoffs, won by the Donalsonville Seminoles.

The Crestview franchise permanently folded following the 1954 season, replaced by the Pensacola Dons in the 1957 Alabama–Florida League. Crestview, Florida has not hosted another minor league team.

== The ballpark ==
The Crestview Braves hosted home minor league home games at Richbourg Field. Still in use today, Richbourg Field is located at 275 North Avenue E.

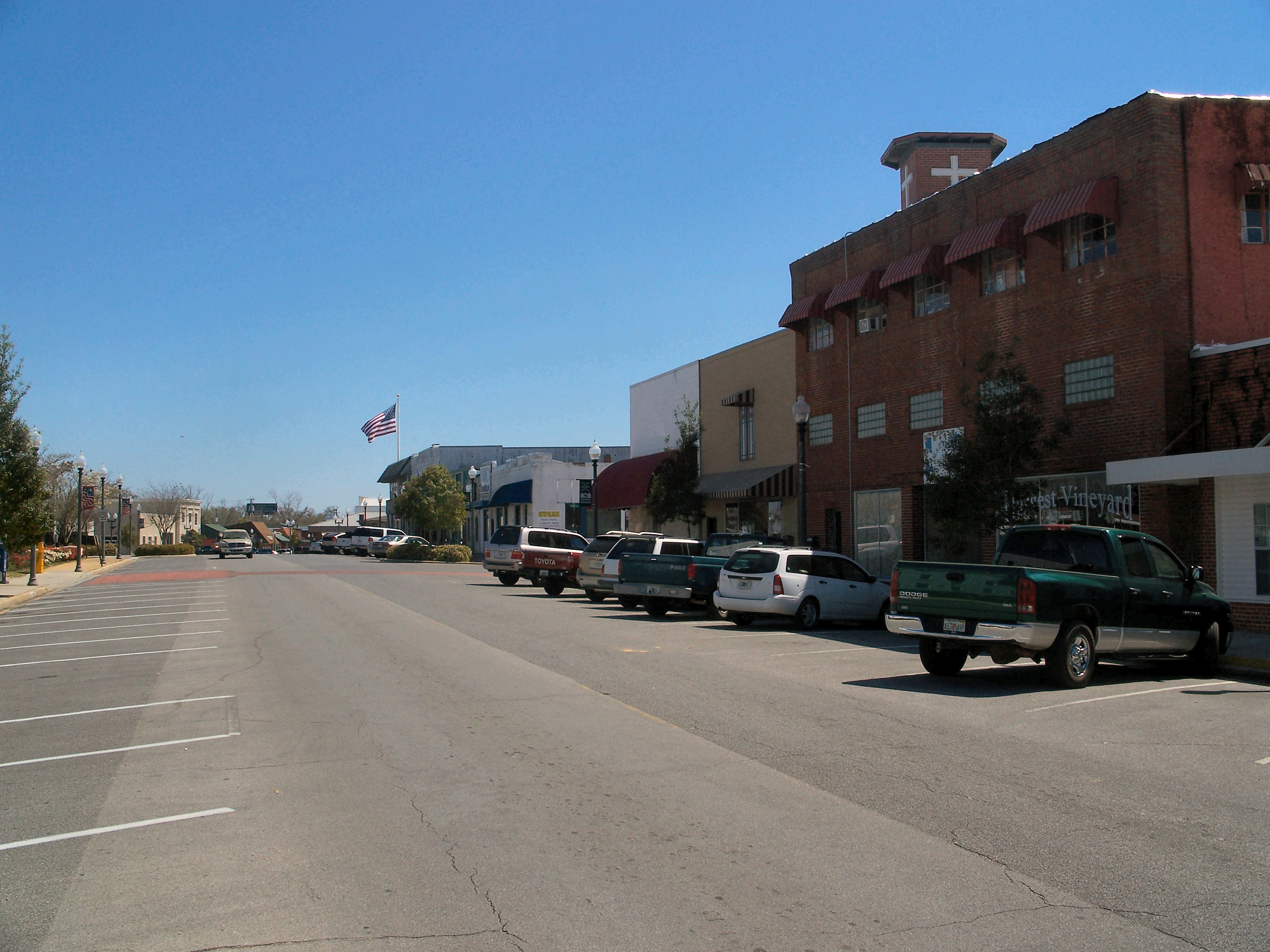
(2008) Main Street. National Register of Historic Places. Crestview, Florida

== Timeline ==
Year(s)	# Yrs.	Team	Level	League	Affiliate	Ballpark
1954–1955	2	Crestview Braves	Class D	Alabama-Florida League	None	Richbourg Field
1956	1	Crestview Braves	Class D	Alabama-Florida League	Chicago Cubs	Richbourg Field

== Year–by–year records ==
Year	Record	Finish	Manager	Playoffs/Notes
1954	55–59	5th	Fred Williams	Did not qualify
1955	54–66	4th	Nesbit Wilson	Lost in Finals
1956	51–59	5th	Walt Dixon	Did not qualify

== Notable alumni ==
- Jack Curtis (1956)
- Walt Dixon (1956, MGR)
- Marshall Renfroe (1954)
- Fred Williams (1954, MGR)

== See also ==
- Crestview Braves players
