= Donalsonville Seminoles =

- 1955–1956; Donalsonville, Georgia

Minor league affiliations
- Class: Class D (1955–1956)
- League: Alabama–Florida League (1955–1956)

Major league affiliations
- Team: None

Minor league titles
- League titles (1): 1956
- Wild card berths (1): 1956

Team data
- Name: Donalsonville Indians (1955); Donalsonville Seminoles (1956)
- Ballpark: Gibson Field (1955–1956)

The Donalsonville Seminoles were a minor league baseball team based in Donalsonville, Georgia. In 1955 and 1956, Donalsonville played as members of the Alabama–Florida League, beginning play as the Donalsonville Indians in 1955. The Seminoles captured the 1956 Alabama–Florida League championship. Donalsonville hosted minor league home games at Gibson Field.

== History ==
Minor League baseball began in Donalsonville in 1955, when the Donalsonville Indians became members of the six–team Class D level Alabama–Florida League. The Crestview Braves, Dothan Cardinals, Fort Walton Beach Jets, Graceville Oilers and Panama City Fliers teams joined the Indians in league play.

Beginning play on April 18, 1955, the Indians ended their first season of Alabama–Florida League play in last place. With a record of 47–73, the Indians placed sixth in the six–team league, playing the season under manager Charley Grant. Donalsonville finished 26.0 games behind the first place Panama City Fliers in the final regular season standings. For the season, the Indians scored 686 total runs and allowed 857 runs, most in the league. Player/manager Charley Grant led the league with 37 home runs and led Donalsonville with a .329 average.

Prior to the beginning of the 1956 season, Donalsonville played an exhibition game against the Florida State Seminoles baseball team.

In their final season of play, the newly named 1956 "Donalsonville Seminoles" won the Alabama–Florida League championship. In the regular season, the Seminoles ended the 1956 season with a record of 68–49, placing second in the Alabama–Florida League regular season standings, finishing 0.5 game behind the first place Graceville Oilers. The Seminoles led the Alabama–Florida League scoring 778 runs under manager Neb Wilson. In the Playoffs, the Donalsonville Seminoles defeated the Dothan Cardinals 3 games to 2 to advance. In the Finals, the Seminoles defeated the Fort Walton Beach Jets 4 games to 2 to win the championship. Neb Wilson was a player/manager and led the league with 40 home runs and 125 RBI. Thomas Fitzgerald of Donalsonville led the league with 206 strikeouts.

The Donalsonville franchise did not return to play following the 1956 championship season. Donalsonville, Georgia has not hosted another minor league team.

== The ballpark ==
The Donalsonville minor league teams hosted minor league home games at Gibson Field. Gibson Field had a capacity of 3,000 and was located within Davis Park. Davis Park is still in use as a public park and is located at South 7th Street & South Dowling Avenue in Donalsonville, Georgia.

== Timeline ==
| Year(s) | # Yrs. | Team | Level | League | Ballpark |
|---|---|---|---|---|---|
| 1955 | 1 | Donalsonville Indians | Class D | Alabama–Florida League | Gibson Field |
| 1956 | 1 | Donalsonville Seminoles | Class D | Alabama–Florida League | Gibson Field |

== Year–by–year records ==
| Year | Record | Finish | Manager | Playoffs/Notes |
|---|---|---|---|---|
| 1955 | 47–73 | 6th | Charley Grant | Did not qualify |
| 1956 | 68–49 | 2nd | Neb Wilson | League champions |

== Notable alumni ==
- Jack Smith (1955)
- Donalsonville Seminoles players
