= Bunny Fabrique =

American baseball player (1887–1960)

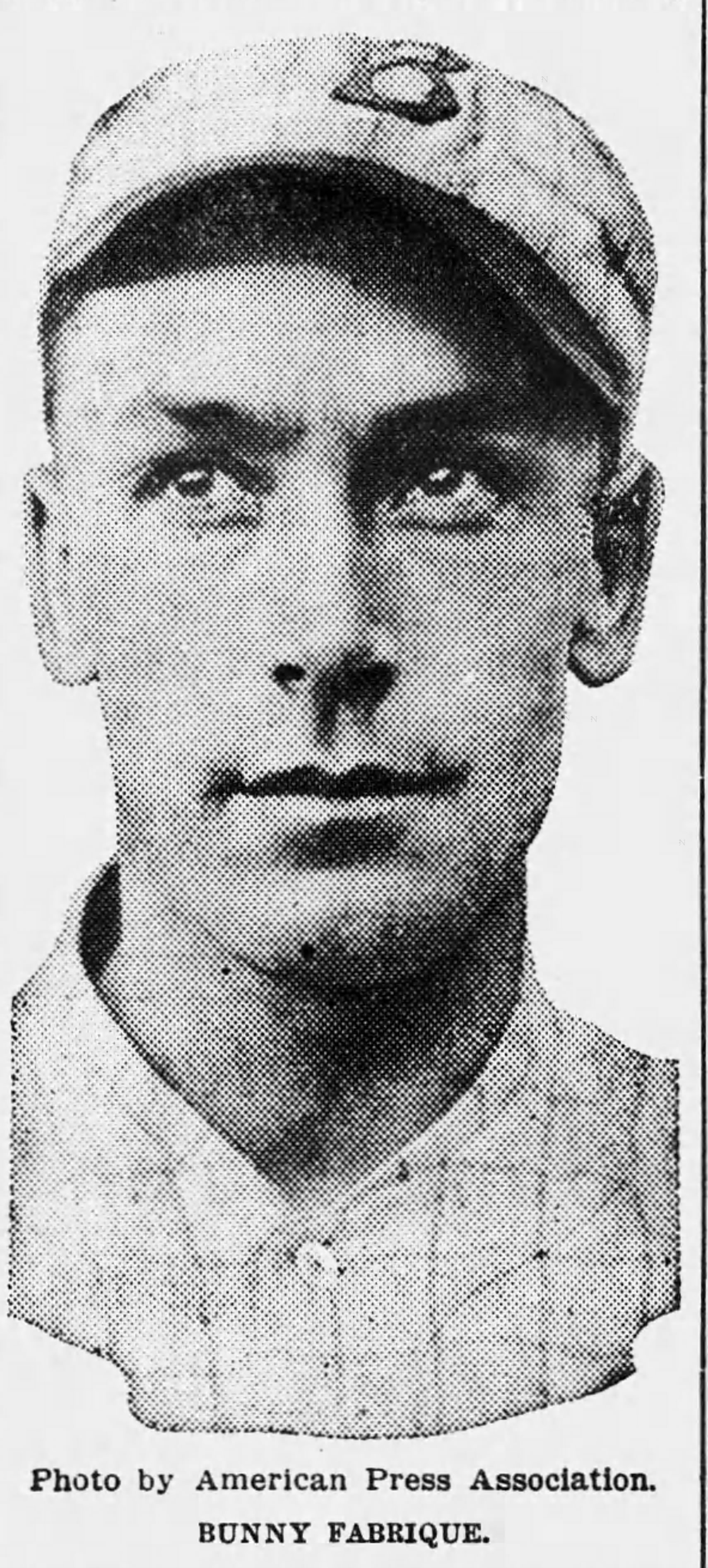
- Shortstop
- Born: December 23, 1887; Clinton, Michigan, U.S.
- Died: January 10, 1960 (aged 72); Ann Arbor, Michigan, U.S.
- Batted: Switch Threw: Right

MLB debut
- October 4, 1916, for the Brooklyn Robins

Last MLB appearance
- June 20, 1917, for the Brooklyn Robins

MLB statistics
- Batting average: .200
- Home runs: 1
- Runs batted in: 3
- Stats at Baseball Reference

Teams
- Brooklyn Robins (1916–1917)

Albert La Verne "Bunny" Fabrique (December 23, 1887 – January 10, 1960) was an American switch-hitting baseball player. A shortstop and, in later years, second baseman, he played for the Brooklyn Robins of the National League for parts of the 1916 and 1917 seasons, appearing in 27 major-league games. He also played over 20 years with more than 15 minor-league and independent baseball teams, starting in 1906 and concluding in 1927. His longest tenures were with the Jackson Convicts (1908–1911), the Fort Wayne Railroaders (1912–1913), and the Providence Grays (1913–1916). During the 1926 and 1927 seasons, he was the player-manager of Vicksburg Hill Billies of the Cotton States League.

== Early life ==
Fabrique was born on December 23, 1887, in Clinton, Lenawee County, Michigan. He was the son of Charles and Mabel Fabrique. Fabrique's mother died when he was two years old, and he was raised by his father, who was a millwright in Clinton.

In high school, Fabrique played shortstop on his high school's baseball team.

=== Reported connection with French royalty ===
It was widely reported, though a later account describes the claim as "improbable", that Fabrique was a descendant of Louis XVI, the king of France who was executed by guillotine during the French Revolution. Fabrique himself reportedly claimed to be a descendant of Louis XVI. The Fort Wayne Weekly Journal-Gazette stated:

The Central League this season will have among its players a man with royal blood coursing through his veins. ... Fabrique is a descendant of Louis XVI, king of France, and although it would take some figuring to prove this, it is a positive fact, for the male side of the family is clearly traced.

The same publication joked that if Louis XVI had possessed "the nerve and steel" of his descendant, France would still be a monarchy. Fabrique quipped that if he were the king, "league baseball would flourish throughout France, and I would build palaces for the umpire and dungeons for the umpire baiters."

In a modern biography of Fabrique published by the Society for American Baseball Research (SABR), biographer David Krell called the royal bloodline into question, writing that Fabrique "enjoyed a reported, though improbable, familial lineage to King Louis XVI."

== Professional baseball ==
=== Michigan clubs (1906–1911) ===
According to one account, Fabrique began his professional baseball career playing in the Jackson Twilight League. In 1906, at age 18, he played shortstop for a team from Columbiaville, Michigan.

In May 1907, at age 19, Fabrique played shortstop for a Flint, Michigan, club. He also played in the Southern Michigan League for a team in Tecumseh, Michigan. He was teammates at Tecumseh with future major-league star Fred Merkle. The manager at Tecumseh "saw nothing promising" in Fabrique and "handed him over" for the 1908 season to the Jackson Convicts in the same league.

Fabrique played four seasons with Jackson, from 1908 to 1911. As of August 2, 1910, Fabrique had "never missed an inning" or been suspended, laid off, gotten sick leave, or been "chased by an umpire", in over two years since joining the Jackson club, and despite being hurt on several occasions.

During the 1911 season, he appeared in 136 games and compiled a .300 batting average and a .364 slugging percentage. After the 1911 season, one scout stated that Fabrique is "fast and has a powerful arm, and is better on balls to his extreme right than any other infielder I have ever seen work, because of the confidence he has in his whip."

=== Fort Wayne and Providence (1912–1916) ===
In 1912, Fabrique was purchased by the Fort Wayne Railroaders of the Class B Central League. Fabrique appeared in 129 games for Fort Wayne in 1912. His batting average dipped to .241 in 1912 (his first season in Class B baseball) but rose to .302 in 107 games at Fort Wayne during the 1913 season. A Fort Wayne sports writer later wrote that, while playing for Fort Wayne, Fabrique was one of the "most popular ball players ever turned out" in Fort Wayne and a player whose "sensational performances in all departments stamped him as one of the greatest ball players ever developed in this city."

Fabrique was purchased by the Detroit Tigers in August 1913, but he was sent to the Providence Grays for "seasoning" and without a trial in Detroit, because it was felt he had no chance of taking the position from Detroit's longtime shortstop, Donie Bush.

In 1914, Fabrique appeared in 147 games, stole 22 bases, and compiled a .335 on-base percentage, helping Providence to a 95–59 record and the International League pennant. In 1915, Fabrique appeared in 137 of 138 games for the Providence team and tallied a .261 batting average and .322 on-base percentage. In 1916, he appeared in 139 games, compiled a career-best .315 batting average, and a .389 slugging percentage. with 25 extra-base hits Fabrique also won a reputation for his defensive play in 1916, tallying 435 assists in 139 games.

=== Brooklyn and Toledo (1916–1917) ===
Near the end of the 1916 season, Fabrique was purchased by the Brooklyn Robins of the National League. He made his major-league debut on October 4, 1916, going hitless in two at bats against the New York Giants.

Fabrique returned to Brooklyn as a 29-year-old rookie in the spring of 1917. During spring training at Hot Springs, Arkansas, Fabrique beat Ivy Olson and Ollie O'Mara for the starting shortstop position on a veteran team that had won the 1916 National League pennant and included future Baseball Hall of Famers Zack Wheat, Rube Marquard, and Casey Stengel. In an early preseason game against the World Series champion Boston Red Sox, Fabrique had four hits and a walk in five plate appearances against Boston's Ernie Shore, Carl Mays, and Babe Ruth. Fabrique also handled seven chances in the game without a bobble. The Brooklyn Eagle wrote:

Facing perhaps the severest test probably ever devised for a rookie just breaking into fast company, the little shortstop from Providence yesterday showed his worth by playing a brilliant all around game against practically the same club that won the world's championship last fall.

He began the 1917 season as one of the hottest batters in the National League. As of April 21, 1917, he ranked fourth in the league with a .500 batting average. Another account stated that Fabrique was "regarded as one of the season's phenoms." His success in Brooklyn was short-lived. A Brooklyn sports article later described Fabrique's rapid rise and fall:

In 1917 Ebbets thought he had solved the problems with Bunny Fabrique, who was fielding spectacularly and far out in front of the league hitters in early June. One day Fabrique stopped hitting, started booting easy chances in the field. He swiftly slid back to the minors and never came back.

Fabrique finished with a .205 batting average in 25 games for the 1917 Brooklyn club. He made his final major-league appearance on June 20, 1917.

Brooklyn sent Fabrique to the Toledo Iron Men of the American Association. The move to Toronto led to an immediate turn-around at the plate, as Fabrique was batting for an average of .512 on July 11. At the end of the season, he led the all Toledo players with at least 50 at bats, registering a .299 batting average and a .367 slugging percentage during the 1917 season. In August 1917, Fabrique had the little toe on his left foot cut off his left foot as a result of being spiked by a runner sliding into second base.

=== Military service and Pacific Coast League (1918–1919) ===
Fabrique enlisted in the United States Navy during World War I and served from May 1918 until his discharge in February 1919.

Fabrique began the 1919 season with the Seattle Rainiers of the Pacific Coast League. Fabrique was credited with "fielding in fast style", but his hitting "was suffering greatly."

In late May 1919, the Los Angeles Angels purchased Fabrique from Seattle. At the end of the season, the Los Angeles Times called Fabrique "a far more valuable man than is generally conceded", and though "rather an awkward fielder," he "gets 'em just the same, and makes some remarkable plays." The Times also called him "about the most dangerous hitter on the club with men on bases" in the latter part of the season.

=== Kansas City, Oil City, and San Joaquin Valley (1920–1923) ===
In February 1920, the Kansas City Blues of the American Association acquired Fabrique in a six-player trade with Los Angeles. He compiled a .277 batting average and a .319 slugging percentage in 25 games for Kansas City.

In mid-May 1920, Fabrique and another player quit the Kansas City Blues to play for the independent Oil City Oilers, sometimes referred to as an "outlaw" team, in Oil City, Pennsylvania. Fabrique and the other player were lured to Oil City by the offer of higher salaries, reportedly $3,500 a year with a $1,000 signing bonus. The Kansas City club threatened legal action at the time.

Fabrique played for Oil City for the balance of the 1920 season and the first half of the 1921 season. He left Oil City at the end of July 1921 to play in California's San Joaquin Valley League. He played the balance of the 1921 season with Dinuba Sun Maids. In 1922 and 1923, he played for the Hanford team in the same league, batting .431 in the second half of the 1922 season.

=== Racine, Springfield, and Vicksburg (1924–1927) ===
Fabrique began the 1924 season with the Racine club in the Midwest League. In 1925, at age 37, Fabrique played at second base for the Springfield Senators in the Three-I League. He finished second in hitting among the league's second baseman and fourth in fielding.

In April 1926, Fabrique signed to manage the Vicksburg Hill Billies in the Cotton States League. He was a player-manager for Vickburg in 1926, appearing in 96 games as the team's second baseman. He took over a team that a Vicksburg newspaper described as a "hopeless tail end cub" and by "good maneuvering" led the team to a first-place finish.

During the offseason after the 1926 season, Fabrique returned to Springfield to work as a bond salesman.

Fabrique returned to Vicksburg in March 1927 as player-manager. He appeared in only 39 games. Fabrique was not able to build a winning combination in 1927 and left the club in early June 1927.

After leaving Vicksburg, Fabrique returned to the Springfield team as a scout. On loan from Springfield, he also played several games for the Terre Haute Tots while their second baseman recovered from an injury.

== Later life and family ==
In 1919, Fabrique married Lois Manning of Providence, Rhode Island. She died in 1925. After the death of his wife, Fabrique returned to Clinton, Michigan, where he lived for 23 years with his sister, Ethel Ward. He worked for the Ford Motor Company in Dearborn, Michigan, and for the Clinton Machine Co. until his retirement from the latter company in approximately 1957.

Fabrique died on January 10, 1960, at age 72, at the Veterans Hospital in Ann Arbor, Michigan. He had been a patient there for a month. His cause of death was Laennec's cirrhosis, a diagnosis used to refer to chronic alcohol-related liver cirrhosis.

== Name ==
During his early years in professional baseball, Fabrique grew from five feet, four inches, 125 pounds, to five feet, eight inches, 150 pounds. He was given the nickname "Bunny" due to his small size and speed. In 2002, The Morning Call included Fabrique on its list of "all 'name' players". In 2019, sports writer Norm Clarke included Fabrique on his lineup card for baseball's best nicknames, writing that Fabrique "would have been a fantastique fan favorite in Montreal."
