= Beidenham Park =

Former baseball field in Louisiana

Coordinates: 32.496943°N 93.765273°W

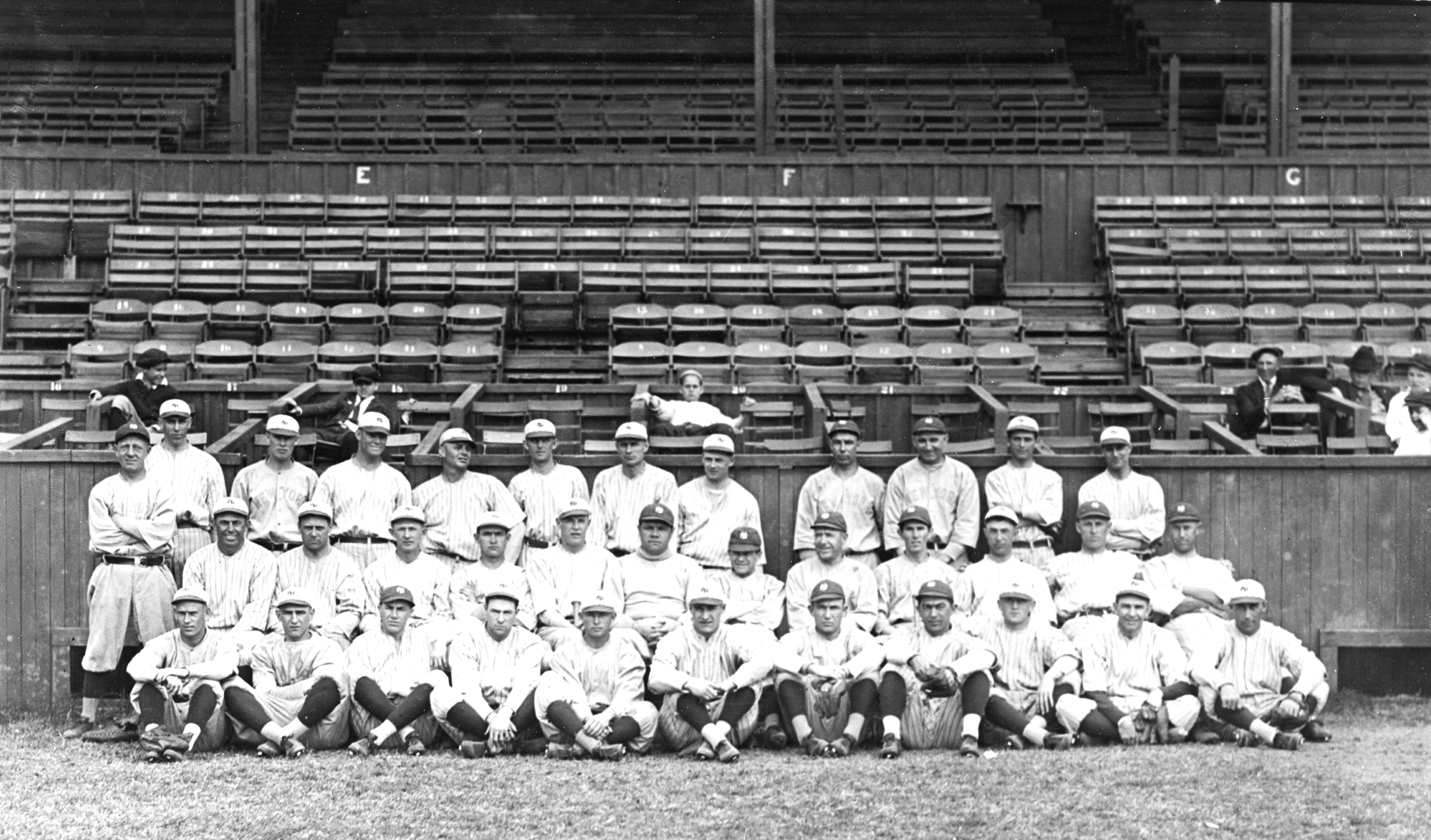
- New York Yankees at then named Gassers Park during spring training in 1921
- Interactive map of Beidenham Park
- Former names: League Park 1901–1910; Gassers Park 1915–1924
- Location: Dove Street at Park and Sycamore Avenues; Shreveport, LA 71103
- Capacity: 6,300 (1919); 5,000 (1924); 7,000 (1932)
- Surface: Grass

Construction
- Opened: 1901
- Demolished: 1932

Tenants
- Shreveport Pirates (SA/TL) 1904–1910; Shreveport Gassers (TL) 1915–1924; Shreveport Sports (TL) 1925–1932; New York Yankees (MLB) (spring training) (1921)

Beidenham Park was a baseball stadium in Shreveport, Louisiana, located at Dove Street intersecting with Park and Sycamore Avenues. The ballpark opened in 1901 and was demolished by fire on May 4, 1932. The stadium had a seating capacity of 6,300 in 1919, 5,000 in 1924 and 7,000 in 1932.

The grandstand area was extensive with a smaller grandstand section and had a long, narrow bleacher area.

== Tenants ==
The ballpark served as the home field of the Shreveport Pirates in both the Southern Association and Texas League from 1904 through 1910, the Shreveport Gassers in the Texas League from 1915 through 1924 and the Shreveport Sports in the Texas League from 1925 through 1932.

The ballpark was the New York Yankees spring training site in 1921.

== Site location ==
SPAR Stadium was later built on the same site in 1935. A community ballpark, Galilee Stewart–Belle Stadium, named for local Negro League and Major League Baseball players, Riley Stewart and Albert Belle, now stands on the site.
