= Clinton, Michigan =

Clinton is the name of some places in the U.S. state of Michigan:

- Clinton County, Michigan
- Clinton Township, Macomb County, Michigan
- Clinton, Lenawee County, Michigan, village
- Clinton Township, Lenawee County, Michigan
- Clinton Township, Oscoda County, Michigan
