= Shreveport Pirates (baseball) =

- 1904–1910; Shreveport, Louisiana

Minor league affiliations
- Class: Double-A (1904–1910)
- League: Southern Association (1904–1907); Texas League (1908–1910)

Team data
- Name: Shreveport Pirates (1904–1910)
- Ballpark: League Park (1904–1910)

The Shreveport Pirates were a minor league baseball team based from Shreveport, Louisiana, United States. The team played from 1904 to 1910, first in the Southern Association from 1904 to 1907, and in the Texas League from 1908 to 1910. The team played their home games at League Park.

Major league players such as Tom Fisher, Bill Grahame and Stub Smith played for the team. Fisher also managed the team during his time on the Pirates.
