= Dixie League (1933 baseball) =

Dixie League 1933
- Classification: Class C (1933)
- Sport: Minor League Baseball
- First season: 1933
- Folded: 1933
- Replaced by: East Dixie League; West Dixie League
- President: J. Alvin Gardner (1933)
- No. of teams: 9
- Country: United States of America
- Most titles: 1 Baton Rouge Solons (1933)
- Related competitions: Dixie League (1916 baseball)

The Dixie League was a Class C level baseball league formed in 1933, with teams based in the US states of Louisiana, Texas, Mississippi, and Arkansas.

== History ==
The 1933 eight–team Dixie League was under the direction of president J. Alvin Gardner. The Baton Rouge Solons won the 1933 league championship. After one season of competition, the Dixie League was split into the East Dixie League and West Dixie League, with both leagues competing in the 1934 and 1935 seasons.

== Standings & statistics ==
=== 1933 Dixie League ===
schedule

Team standings	W	L	PCT	GB	Managers
Baton Rouge Solons	77	47	.621	–	Josh Billings
Shreveport Sports	74	49	.602	2½	Gus Whelan / Dutch Lorbeer
Jackson Senators	70	56	.556	8	Herschel Bobo
Henderson Oilers	64	61	.512	13½	Art Phelan
Tyler Governors	59	65	.476	18	Wray Query
Waco Cubs / Pine Bluff Judges	56	69	.448	21½	Buddy Tanner
El Dorado Lions	49	74	.398	27½	Dusty Boggess / Joe Granade
Longview Cannibals	48	76	.387	29	Abe Bowman / Joe Cantrell; Art Jahn

Waco (24–38) moved to Pine Bluff June 27. Pine Bluff folded August 22 - six remaining games forfeited to the opponent.
Playoff: Baton Rouge 4 games, Shreveport 2, one tie.

Player statistics
Player	Team	Stat	Tot	Player	Team	Stat	Tot
George Brown	Longview	BA	.360	Steve Larkin	Shreveport	W	22
Charles Gilbert	Baton Rouge	Runs	116	George Mills	Tyler	SO	143
Jimmy Dalrymple	Henderson	Hits	180	Gene McClung	Baton Rouge	ERA	2.34
Sam T. Jones	Henderson	RBI	105	Steve Larkin	Shreveport	PCT	.759 22–7
Stormy Davis	Waco/Pine Bluff	HR	17				
