= Shreveport Gassers =

Texas League baseball team based in Shreveport, Louisiana

- 1914–1924; Shreveport, Louisiana

Minor league affiliations
- Class: Double-A (1914–1924)
- League: Texas League (1914–1924)

Major league affiliations
- Team: Philadelphia Athletics (1923–1924)

Minor league titles
- League titles: 1919

Team data
- Name: Shreveport Gassers (1914–1924)
- Ballpark: Gassers Park (1914–1924)

The Shreveport Gassers were a Texas League baseball team based in Shreveport, Louisiana, United States that played from 1915 to 1924 at Gassers Park. They were affiliated with the Philadelphia Athletics from 1923 to 1924.

Under manager Billy Smith, they won their only league championship in 1919.
