= Jim Higgins (basketball) =

American basketball player

Personal information
- Born: December 25, 1918 Olney, Illinois, U.S.
- Died: February 12, 2002 (aged 83) Urbana, Illinois, U.S.
- Listed height: 6 ft 8 in (2.03 m)
- Listed weight: 220 lb (100 kg)

Career information
- High school: Olney (Olney, Illinois)
- Position: Center

Career history
- 1940: Hammond Ciesar All-Americans

James Chaplin Higgins (December 25, 1918 – February 12, 2002) was an American professional basketball player. He played in the National Basketball League for the Hammond Ciesar All-Americans in one game during the 1940–41 season and scored one point.

Higgins was also a minor league baseball player. He played for the Baltimore Orioles (minor league team), Federalsburg A's, Dover Orioles, Appleton Papermakers, and Vicksburg Hill Billies.
