= Doug Taitt =

American baseball player (1902–1970)

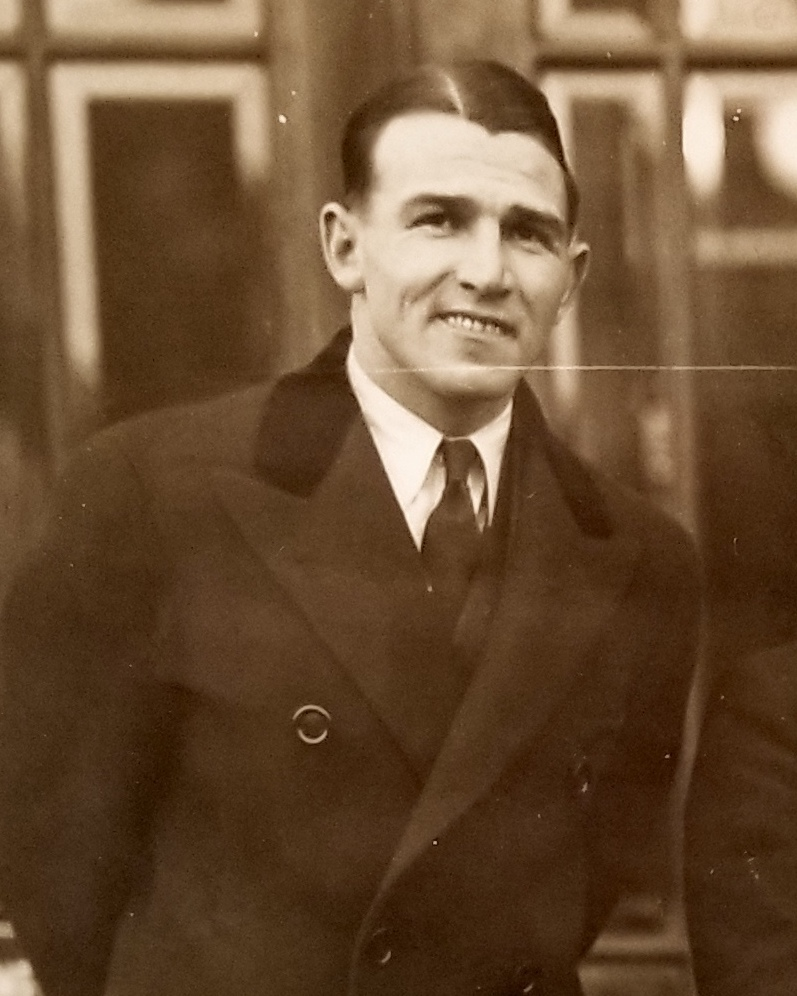
- Tait in 1929
- Outfielder
- Born: August 3, 1902; Bay City, Michigan, U.S.
- Died: December 12, 1970 (aged 68); Portland, Oregon, U.S.
- Batted: Left Threw: Right

MLB debut
- April 10, 1928, for the Boston Red Sox

Last MLB appearance
- May 4, 1932, for the Philadelphia Phillies

MLB statistics
- Batting average: .263
- Home runs: 4
- Runs batted in: 95
- Stats at Baseball Reference

Teams
- Boston Red Sox (1928–1929); Chicago White Sox (1929); Philadelphia Phillies (1931–1932)

Douglas John Taitt [Poco] (August 3, 1902 – December 12, 1970) was an American right fielder in Major League Baseball and a player/manager in the Minor leagues. Listed at 6' 0, 176 lb., he batted left-handed and threw right-handed.

A native of Bay City, Michigan, Taitt spent 23 years in baseball (1925–1947), including four major league seasons between 1928 and 1932.

Taitt entered the majors in 1928 with the Boston Red Sox, playing for them through the 1929 midseason before joining the Chicago White Sox (1929) and Philadelphia Phillies (1931–1932). His most productive season came in his rookie year for Boston, when he posted career-numbers in games (143), hits (144), doubles (28), triples, stolen bases (13) and on-base percentage (.350), while hitting a .299 average with 51 runs scored and 61 runs batted in, also career-highs. Inexplicably, he faded after that and was relegated to a backup role.

In a four-season career, Taitt was a .263 hitter (217-for-824) with four home runs and 95 RBI in 258 games, including 81 runs, 43 doubles, 16 triples and 13 stolen bases. In 228 outfield appearances (58 at left field) he posted a collective .975 fielding percentage (12 errors in 479 chances).

Following his brief stint in major leagues Taitt resumed his career in the minors. In 1931 he led the Southern Association in hits (194), home runs (17) and triples (19), and also topped the league with a .355 average in 1935 and with 20 home runs and 132 RBI a year later. He collected 2,150 hits in his minor league career, while batting .331 with 107 home runs and a slugging of .500 in 1874 games.

He later managed from 1938 through 1947, leading the Monroe White Sox of the Cotton States League to three division titles (1939–1941) and two league championships (1938, 1940).

Taitt died in 1970 in Portland, Oregon, at the age of 68.

== See also ==
- 1928 Boston Red Sox season
