= Steve Larkin =

American baseball player (1910–1969)

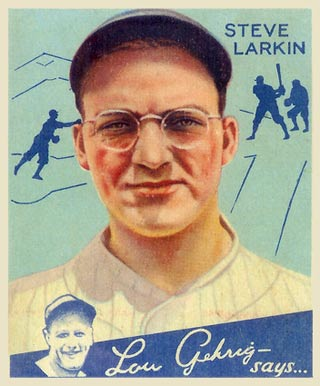
- Pitcher
- Born: December 9, 1910; Cincinnati, Ohio, U.S.
- Died: May 2, 1969 (aged 58); Norristown, Pennsylvania, U.S.
- Batted: Right Threw: Right

MLB debut
- May 6, 1934, for the Detroit Tigers

Last MLB appearance
- May 9, 1934, for the Detroit Tigers

MLB statistics
- Win–loss record: 0–0
- Strikeouts: 8
- Earned run average: 1.50
- Stats at Baseball Reference

Teams
- Detroit Tigers (1934)

Stephen Patrick Larkin (December 9, 1910 – May 2, 1969) was an American Major League Baseball pitcher.

Larkin joined the Detroit Tigers organization in 1931, signing a contract with Evansville. During the 1931 season, he played in Raleigh, North Carolina, and Wheeling, West Virginia. During the 1932 season, he played for the Tigers' farm clubs in Decatur, Illinois, Moline, Illinois, Huntington, and Beaumont. In 1933, he compiled a 22–7 record for the Shreveport Sports in the Dixie League, pitching 280 innings with 142 strikeouts and 96 walks. He led the Dixie League in wins and winning percentage during the 1933 season.

After his strong performance in Shreveport, Larkin was invited to the Tigers' spring camp at Lakeland, Florida, in 1934. He played in two games for the 1934 Detroit Tigers. He pitched 6 innings and gave up only one earned run for an earned run average of 1.50.

With the Tigers' having a strong pitching staff, Larkin was sent to Beaumont in June 1934. In November 1934, The Sporting News profiled Larkin as one of the "Minors Coming UP to Majors in '35." The Sporting News said of Larkin: "If size, weight and general physical appointments mean anything, somebody will have to move over on the Detroit bench and make room for Steve Larkin next spring. The 200-pounder, towering an inch above six feet ... appears to be one of the most promising of the pitching prospects scheduled to receive big league inspection."

Larkin did not make the Tigers' roster in 1935. After two more years in Detroit's farm system, playing in Beaumont and Milwaukee, Larkin was released by the Tigers' organization in December 1936. Larkin concluded his baseball career in 1938 pitching for Portland and Fort Worth.
