= Ted Jourdan =

American baseball player (1895–1961)

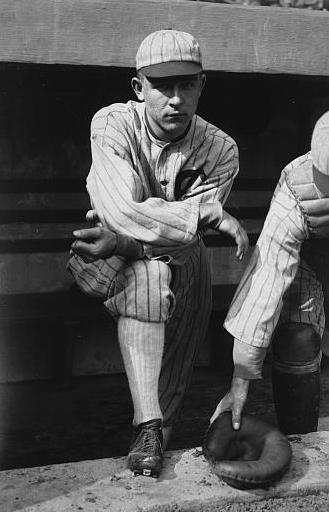
- First baseman
- Born: September 5, 1895; New Orleans, Louisiana, U.S.
- Died: September 23, 1961 (aged 66); New Orleans, Louisiana, U.S.
- Batted: Left Threw: Left

MLB debut
- September 18, 1916, for the Chicago White Sox

Last MLB appearance
- October 3, 1920, for the Chicago White Sox

MLB statistics
- Batting average: .214
- Home runs: 0
- Runs batted in: 11
- Stats at Baseball Reference

Teams
- Chicago White Sox (1916–1918, 1920)

Career highlights and awards
- World Series champion (1917)

Theodore Charles Jourdan (September 5, 1895 – September 23, 1961) was an American professional baseball player. He was a first baseman over parts of four seasons (1916–1918, 1920) with the Chicago White Sox. For his career, he compiled a .214 batting average in 196 at-bats, with 11 runs batted in.

He was born and later died in New Orleans, Louisiana at the age of 66.
