= Ace Stewart =

American baseball player (1869–1912)

- Second baseman
- Born: February 14, 1869; Terre Haute, Indiana, U.S.
- Died: April 17, 1912 (aged 43); Terre Haute, Indiana, U.S
- Batted: Right Threw: Right

MLB debut
- April 18, 1895, for the Chicago Colts

Last MLB appearance
- August 17, 1895, for the Chicago Colts

MLB statistics
- Batting average: .241
- Home runs: 8
- Runs batted in: 76
- Stats at Baseball Reference

Teams
- Chicago Colts (1895)

Asa "Ace" Stewart (February 14, 1869 – April 17, 1912) was an American Major League Baseball player. Stewart played for the Chicago Colts in the 1895 season. He batted and threw right-handed.

Stewart died in his home town of Terre Haute, Indiana in 1912 of uremia.
