= Art Ewoldt =

American baseball player (1894-1977)

- Third baseman
- Born: January 8, 1894; Paullina, Iowa
- Died: December 8, 1977 (aged 83); Des Moines, Iowa
- Batted: Right Threw: Right

MLB debut
- September 17, 1919, for the Philadelphia Athletics

Last MLB appearance
- September 27, 1919, for the Philadelphia Athletics
- Stats at Baseball Reference

Teams
- Philadelphia Athletics (1919)

Arthur Lee Ewoldt (January 8, 1894 – December 8, 1977) was an American Major League Baseball infielder. He played for the Philadelphia Athletics during the 1919 season.
