= Eddie Palmer (baseball) =

American baseball player (1893-1983)

- Third baseman
- Born: June 1, 1893; Petty, Texas, U.S.
- Died: January 9, 1983 (aged 89); Marlow, Oklahoma, U.S.
- Batted: Right Threw: Right

MLB debut
- September 6, 1917, for the Philadelphia Athletics

Last MLB appearance
- October 3, 1917, for the Philadelphia Athletics

MLB statistics
- Batting average: .212
- Home runs: 0
- Runs batted in: 5
- Stats at Baseball Reference

Teams
- Philadelphia Athletics (1917)

Edwin Henry Palmer (June 1, 1893 – January 9, 1983), known as Eddie Palmer and nicknamed Baldy Palmer, was an American Major League Baseball (MLB) third baseman. He played for the Philadelphia Athletics in 1917.
