= Riley Stewart =

American baseball player

- Pitcher
- Born: March 14, 1919; Benton, Louisiana, U.S.
- Died: December 10, 2000 (aged 81); Shreveport, Louisiana, U.S.
- Batted: Left Threw: Right

Negro league baseball debut
- 1946, for the Chicago American Giants

Last appearance
- 1948, for the Chicago American Giants

Teams
- Chicago American Giants (1946–1948)

Riley Anderson Stewart (March 14, 1919 – December 10, 2000) was an American Negro league pitcher in the 1940s.

A native of Benton, Louisiana, Stewart served in the United States Army during World War II. He began his Negro league career in 1946 with the Chicago American Giants, and also played for the Memphis Red Sox.

After his playing career, Stewart was a teacher and coach in Shreveport, Louisiana. Stewart and major league slugger and Shreveport native Albert Belle were responsible for renovating Shreveport's historic SPAR Stadium, which was then renamed "Galilee's Stewart–Belle Stadium". Stewart died in Shreveport in 2000 at age 81.
