= Pine Bluff Judges =

- 1887–1955; (1887, 1903–1906, 1908, 1930–1940, 1948–1955); Pine Bluff, Arkansas

Minor league affiliations
- Previous classes: Class C (1933–1940, 1948–1955); Class D (1903–1906, 1908, 1930–1932)
- League: Cotton States League (1936–1940, 1948–1955)
- Previous leagues: East Dixie League (1934–1935); Dixie League (1933); Cotton States League (1930–1932); Arkansas State League (1908); Arkansas–Texas League (1906); Cotton States League (1903–1905); Southwestern League (1887)

Major league affiliations
- Previous teams: Baltimore Orioles (1954-1955); St. Louis Browns (1949–1953); Brooklyn Dodgers (1939); St. Louis Cardinals (1936–1938)

Minor league titles
- League titles: 4 (1904, 1930, 1935, 1950)

Team data
- Previous names: Pine Bluff Judges (1950–1955); Pine Bluff Cardinals (1948–1949); Pine Bluff Judges (1930–1940); Pine Bluff Pine Knotts (1908); Pine Bluff Barristers (1906); Pine Bluff Lumbermen (1903–1905); Pine Bluff Infants (1887)
- Previous parks: Taylor Memorial Field (1939-1940, 1950-1955) Missouri Pacific Park (1930-1938) Forrest/Bell Park (1904-1905) Jones Park (1887, 1903)

The Pine Bluff Judges were a minor league baseball team, based in Pine Bluff, Arkansas. They existed between 1930 and 1955 and were primarily an affiliate of the St. Louis Browns/Baltimore Orioles playing in the Cotton States League.

The team joined the Cotton States League in 1930 and promptly won the league championship that season. When the league folded after the 1932 season, so did the team. However, the Waco Cubs of the Dixie League moved to town the following season and took on the Judges name. They remained in the East Dixie League the following season and then joined the reformed Cotton States League in 1936.

The team was inactive between 1941 and 1947 during World War II but rejoined the league for the 1948 season. In 1955, they moved to Meridian, Mississippi and became the Meridian Millers.

== Pine Bluff Lumbermen ==
The Pine Bluff Lumbermen existed between 1903-1905 and were members of the Cotton States League. In 1904, The Lumbermen finished with a final record of 73-43 winning their first Cotton States League Pennant, the first championship pennant in the state of Arkansas. The Lumbermen were disbanded in July 1905 due to financial hardships.

== Major Leaguers ==
Pine Bluff MLB Players

1954 - Frank Lucchesi - Manager - Philadelphia 70-72, Texas 75-77, Chicago Cubs 87

1952 - Bob Hale - Baltimore 55-56, 58, Cleveland 60-61, New York Yankees 61

1952 - Hillis Layne - Washington 41

1952 - Jim Snyder - Player Minnesota 61-62, 64 Manager - Seattle 88

1951 - Bud Black - Detroit 52, 55

1950 - Harry Chozen - Cincinnati 37

1950 - Ryne Duren - Baltimore 54, Kansas City 57, NYY 58-61, LAA 61-62, Philadelphia 63-64, Cincinnati 64, Washington 65, Philadelphia 65

1949 - Ed Albrecht - St. Louis 49-50

1940 - Dewey Adkins - Washington 43, Chi Cubs 49

1940 - Stan Goletz - CHI WS 41

1940 - William Red Rollings - Boston 27-28

1940 - Dave Bartosch - St. Louis 45

1939 - Andy Cohen - Player - New York Giants 26, 28-29, Manager - Philadelphia 57

1939 - Ray Hathaway - Brooklyn 45

1939 - Stan Klopp - Boston 44

1939 - Dud Lee - St. Louis 20-21, Boston 24-26

1939 - Jimmy Shevlin - Detroit 30, Cincinnati 32, 34

1937 - Les Willis - Cleveland 47

1936 - Tony Robello - Cincinnati 33-34

1935 - Lena Styles - Philadelphia 19-21, Cincinnati 30-31

1934 - Hugo Klaerner - CHI WS 34

1934 - George Scharein - Philadelphia 37-40

1934 - Les Sweetland - Philadelphia 28-30, CHI Cubs 31

1933 - Bob “Casper” Asbjornson - Boston 28-29, Cincinnati 31-32

1933 - Fred Koster - Philadelphia 31

1933 - George Loepp - Boston 28, Washington 30

1933 - Tony Malinosky - Brooklyn 37

1932 - Joe Berry - Chi Cubs 42, Philadelphia 44-46, Cleveland 46

1931 - Tony DeFate - St. Louis 17, Detroit 17

1931 - Rusty Pence - Chi WS 21

1930 - Howie Camp - NYY 17

1908 - Wild Bill Luhrsen - Pittsburgh 13

1905 - Howard Murphy - St. Louis 09

1904 - Bert Blue - Philadelphia 08, St. Louis 08

1904 - Con Lucid - Louisville 1893, Brooklyn 1894, Philadelphia 1896, St. Louis 1897

1904 - Bert Maxwell - Pittsburgh 06, Philadelphia 08, New York Giants 11, Brooklyn 14

1903 - Georgie Blackburn - Baltimore 1897

1903 - Tim O’Rourke - Syracuse 1890, Columbus 1891, Baltimore 1892-1893, Louisville 1893-94, St. Louis 1894, Washington 1894
