= Clinton Township, Oscoda County, Michigan =

Clinton Township, Michigan
- Civil township
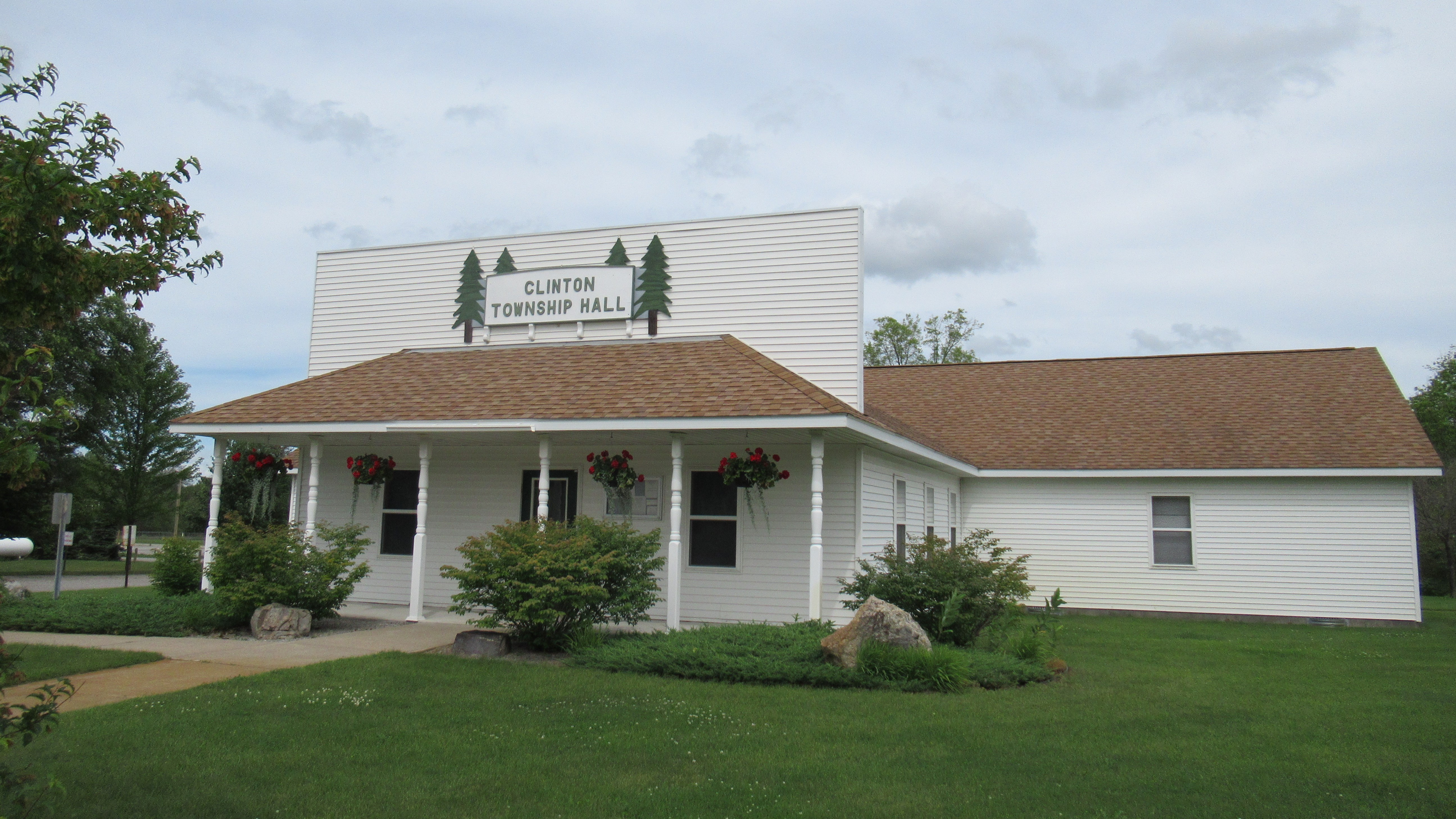
- Clinton Township Hall in Comins

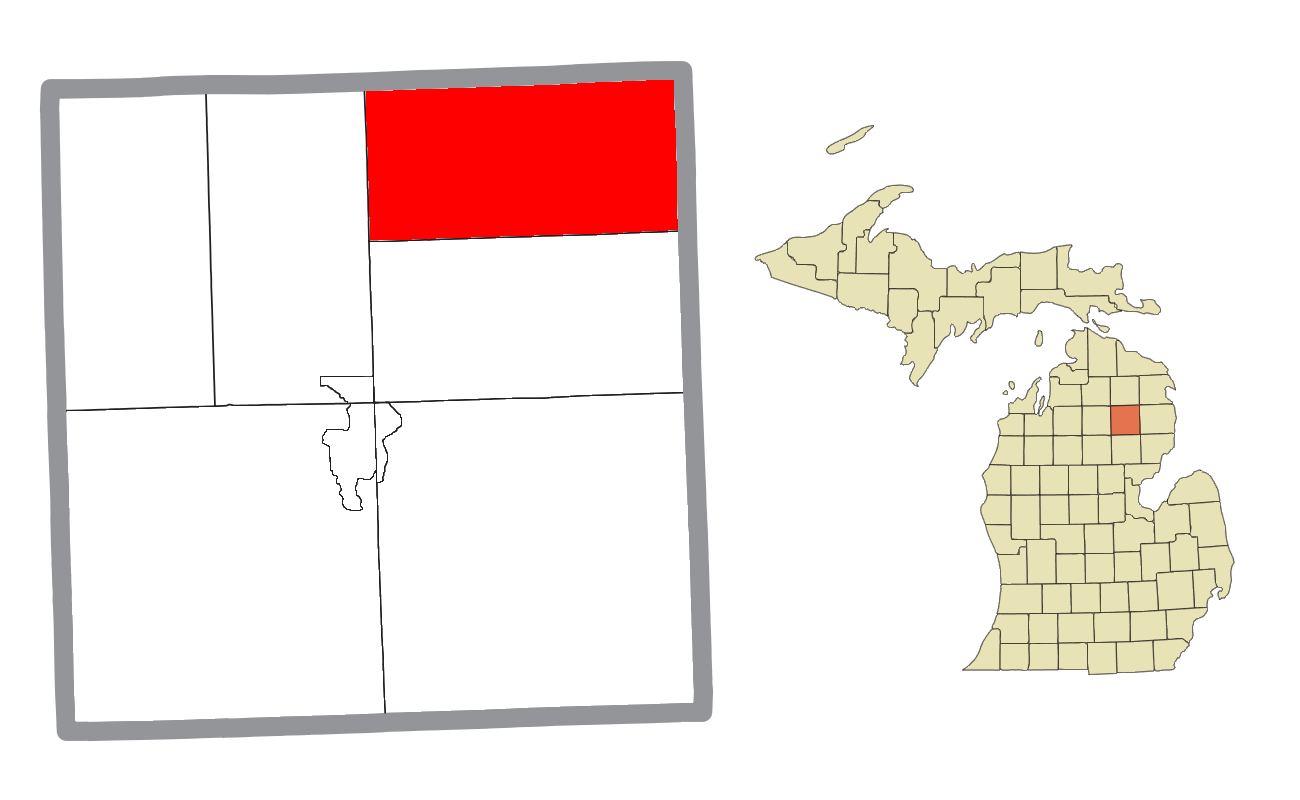
- Location within Oscoda County

- Location within the state of Michigan Location within the United States
- Coordinates: 44°49′09″N 84°00′27″W
- Country: United States
- State: Michigan
- County: Oscoda
- Established: 1891

Government
  - Supervisor: Christopher Neff
  - Clerk: Sheri Sanderson

Area
  - Total: 71.68 sq mi (185.65 km^{2})
  - Land: 70.50 sq mi (182.59 km^{2})
  - Water: 1.18 sq mi (3.06 km^{2})
- Elevation: 994 ft (303 m)

Population (2020)
  - Total: 431
  - Density: 6.11/sq mi (2.36/km^{2})
- Time zone: UTC-5 (Eastern (EST))
  - Summer (DST): UTC-4 (EDT)
- ZIP code(s): 48619 (Comins); 48621 (Fairview); 48647 (Mio); 48728 (Curran)
- Area code: 989
- FIPS code: 26-16540
- GNIS feature ID: 1626101
- Website: https://clinton-township.org/

Clinton Township is a civil township of Oscoda County in the U.S. state of Michigan. The population was 431 at the 2020 census.

== Communities ==
- Comins is an unincorporated community along M-33 at 44°48′18″N 84°03′05″W.

== Geography ==
According to the U.S. Census Bureau, the township has a total area of 71.68 square miles (185.65 km^{2}), of which 70.50 square miles (182.59 km^{2}) is land and 1.18 square miles (3.06 km^{2}) (1.65%) is water.

=== Major highways ===
- M-33 (Abbe Road) runs south–north through the township.

== Demographics ==
As of the census of 2000, there were 511 people, 223 households, and 158 families residing in the township. The population density was 7.3 inhabitants per square mile (2.8/km^{2}). There were 541 housing units at an average density of 7.7 per square mile (3.0/km^{2}). The racial makeup of the township was 97.46% White, 0.20% African American, 1.57% Native American, and 0.78% from two or more races. Hispanic or Latino of any race were 1.17% of the population.

There were 223 households, out of which 22.9% had children under the age of 18 living with them, 60.1% were married couples living together, 6.3% had a female householder with no husband present, and 29.1% were non-families. 24.7% of all households were made up of individuals, and 12.1% had someone living alone who was 65 years of age or older. The average household size was 2.29 and the average family size was 2.67.

In the township the population was spread out, with 18.4% under the age of 18, 6.8% from 18 to 24, 22.3% from 25 to 44, 29.5% from 45 to 64, and 22.9% who were 65 years of age or older. The median age was 46 years. For every 100 females, there were 98.1 males. For every 100 females age 18 and over, there were 104.4 males.

The median income for a household in the township was $33,750, and the median income for a family was $34,375. Males had a median income of $31,528 versus $20,625 for females. The per capita income for the township was $23,549. About 4.8% of families and 6.4% of the population were below the poverty line, including 8.8% of those under age 18 and 5.8% of those age 65 or over.
