= Vicksburg Hill Billies =

- 1893–1955; (1893–1894, 1902–1908, 1910–1912, 1922–1932, 1937, 1941, 1946–1950, 1955); Vicksburg, Mississippi

Minor league affiliations
- Class: Class B (1946–1950); Class C (1937, 1941, 1955); Class D (1902–1908, 1910–1912, 1922–1932)
- League: Mississippi State League (1893–1894); Cotton States League (1902–1908, 1910–1912, 1922–1932, 1937, 1941); Southeastern League (1946–1950); Cotton States League (1955)

Major league affiliations
- Team: St. Louis Cardinals (1923); Chicago White Sox (1937); New York Giants (1950); Chicago Cubs (1955)

Minor league titles
- League titles (2): 1911; 1928
- Conference titles (1): 1912
- Division titles: 6

Team data
- Name: Vicksburg Reds (1893–1894); Vicksburg Hill Climbers (1902); Vicksburg Hill Billies (1903–1904); Vicksburg Hill Climbers (1905); Vicksburg Hill Billies (1906–1907); Vicksburg Hill Climbers (1908); Vicksburg Hill Billies (1910–1912, 1922–1932, 1937, 1941); Vicksburg Billies (1946–1950); Vicksburg Hill Billies (1955)
- Ballpark: Athletic Park (1902–1903, 1907–1908, 1910–1912, 1922–1932); City Park (1937, 1941, 1946–1950, 1955)

The Vicksburg Hill Billies was the primary moniker of the minor league baseball teams based in Vicksburg, Mississippi between 1893 and 1955. Vicksburg teams played as a member of the Mississippi State League (1893–1894), Cotton States League (1902–1903, 1907–1908, 1910–1912, 1922–1932, 1937, 1941), Southeastern League (1946–1950) and Cotton States League (1955).

Vicksburg teams were minor league affiliates of the St. Louis Cardinals in 1923, Chicago White Sox in 1937, New York Giants in 1950 and Chicago Cubs in 1955.

Baseball Hall of Fame member Billy Herman played for the 1928 Vicksburg Hill Billies.

== History ==
=== Mississippi State League (1893–1894) ===
Vicksburg, Mississippi first hosted minor league baseball, when the Vicksburg Reds played as a member of the Mississippi State League in 1893. The Mississippi League folded after the 1894 season.

=== Cotton States League (1902–1908, 1910–1912) ===
In 1902, the Vicksburg Hill Climbers were charter members of the four–team Class D level Cotton States League. The Hill Climbers finished with a record of 52–53, placing third in the Cotton States League. The manager was Jess Reynolds. The ballpark for Vicksburg was Athletic Park. Vicksburg finished third in the 1902 standings, along with the Baton Rouge Cajuns (53–54), Greenville Cotton Pickers (53–55) and Natchez Indians (55–51).

Continuing play in the Cotton States League, the 1903 Vicksburg Hill Billies placed second. The Hill Billies had a 70–46 record under Manager Billy Earle.

The 1904 Vicksburg Hill Climbers finished second in the Cotton States League. The team had a record of 68–48, finishing 2nd in the league under Manager Billy Earle.

The 1905 Cotton States League season was interrupted by an epidemic. The Vicksburg Hill Climbers had a record of 32–43 and placed sixth in league. The managers were Frank Belt and Joe Keenan. Due to the Yellow Fever epidemic, the eight–team Cotton States League stopped play on July 31, 1905, with the approval of the National Association.

Returning to Cotton States League play in 1906, the Vicksburg Hill Billies were managed by Manager Billy Earle and Buck Hooke. The Hill Billies finished 44–74, placing sixth in the Cotton States League.

The 1907 Vicksburg Hill Billies finished second in the Cotton States League. Vicksburg finished with a record of 77–57, playing the season under Manager George Blackburn.

In 1908, the Vicksburg Hill Climbers were 66–49 in the Cotton States League. They finished second in the league and were managed by the returning George Blackburn. The Cotton States league folded for one year after completing the 1908 season.

With the Class D Cotton States League returning to play in 1910, the Vicksburg Hill Billies finished in fifth place. With a record of 46–65 under managers Bruce Hayes and Oliver Mills, Vicksburg continued play at Athletic Park.

The Vicksburg Hill Billies won the 1911 Cotton States League Championship. With a regular season Cotton States League record of 73–42, the Hill Billies finished first in the Cotton States League, which had no playoffs. The 1911 manager was Oliver Mills.

The 1912 Vicksburg Hill Billies disbanded mid-season. Vicksburg was in first place with a record of 66–42, when the franchise disbanded on August 13, 1912, after two other teams in the six–team league disbanded earlier. The manager was Oliver Mills. The Cotton States League played with three teams until folding for the season on August 28, 1912.

=== Cotton States League (1922–1932, 1937, 1941) ===
The Cotton States League reformed, adding playoffs for the first time. The 1922 Vicksburg Hill Billies rejoined the six–team Class D Cotton States League. With a record of 56–60, Vicksburg finished fourth in the Cotton States League. The 1922 managers were Leslie Crichlow and Red Torkelson.

Vicksburg became an affiliate of the St. Louis Cardinals in 1923. On July 24, 1923, the Cotton States League stopped play for the season. With a record of 37–43, Vicksburg finished in sixth place in the eight–team league. They were Managed by Cy Slapnicka and Oliver Mills.

The 1924 season saw The Cotton League return to play. The Vicksburg Hill Billies had four different managers lead the team in Cotton States League play, as the Hill Billies finished 38–62, placing sixth in the Cotton States League. They were managed by Red Torkelson, Grady Adkins, Oliver Mills and Jimmy Johnston.

Led by Manager Clifton Runt Marr, the 1925 Vicksburg Hill Billies finished fourth in the Cotton States League. Vicksburg had a regular season record of 60–62.

The 1926 Vicksburg Hill Billies continued play in the Cotton States League. Vicksburg finished 58–71, placing seventh in the league, under managers Bob Clarke and Bunny Fabrique.

With a record of 54–70, the 1927 Vicksburg Hill Billies finished sixth in the Cotton States League. The manager was Bunny Fabrique.

The Vicksburg Hill Billies won the 1928 Cotton States League Championship. Vicksburg finished the regular season with a 67–56 placing fourth in the league, which had two halves. In the Finals, matching the winner of each half, the Vicksburg Hill Billies defeated the Hattiesburg Pinetoppers 4 games to 3 to capture the championship. The team was managed by Bob Taggert and Wray Query. Baseball Hall of Fame member Billy Herman played for Vicksburg in his first professional season. At age 18, Herman hit .332 in 106 games for the 1928 Hill Billies.

Continuing Cotton States League membership, the 1929 Vicksburg Hill Billies finished with a 55–68 regular season record. Vicksburg was seventh in the 1929 league standings under Wray Query.

Managed by John Brock, Rod Murphy and John King, the 1930 Vicksburg Hill Billies placed sixth in the Cotton States League. Vicksburg had a regular season record of 48–82.

The 1931 Hill Billies made the Cotton States League Playoffs. The Vicksburg Hill Billies finished 66–52, placing second in the Cotton States League regular season, playing under manager Joe Schepner. In the playoffs Finals, the Jackson Senators beat Vicksburg 4 games to 1.

Vicksburg relocated during the 1932 season. On June 1, 1932, the Hill Billies were 13–11 when the franchise moved to Jackson, Mississippi. The team played as the Jackson Mississippians until the Cotton States League disbanded on July 13, 1932. The Vicksburg/Jackson team finished 30–33m placing third overall while playing the season under managers Don McShane, Buck Stapleton and Joe Schepner. 1932 was the last season Vicksburg played at Athletic Park.

Vicksburg rejoined the Class C Cotton States League in 1937 as an affiliate of the Chicago White Sox. The 1937 Vicksburg Hill Billies finished with a record of 55–84. They placed seventh, managed by Ray Brubaker and Alfred Libby. Vicksburg teams began playing at City Park. The 1937 season attendance was 15,835, an average of 228. Vicksburg folded after the season.

Vicksburg rejoined the Class C Cotton States League in 1941 and advanced to the Finals. The 1941 Vicksburg Hill Billies finished with a 76–64 regular season record, placing fourth in the league. Managed by Rip Fanning (0-0) and Al Baker, the Hill Billies qualified for the playoffs. In the 1941 playoffs, Vicksburg defeated the Monroe White Sox 3 games to 2 to advance to the Finals. In the Finals, the Hot Springs Bathers swept Vicksburg in four games. The Cotton States League then folded after the 1941 season.

=== Southeastern League (1946–1950) ===
The Vicksburg Billies joined the Class B level Southeastern League in 1946. The Billies advanced to the 1946 Southeastern League Finals. The Vicksburg Billies finished the regular season with a record of 70–63, ending the season in third place in the Southeastern League. The manager was Buddy Blair. In the playoffs, the Vicksburg Billies defeated the Pensacola Fliers 4 games to 2 to advance. In the Finals, the Anniston Rams defeated Vicksburg in a seven-game series. Playing at City Park, Vicksburg had season attendance of 59,074.

Vicksburg qualified for the 1947 Southeastern League playoffs. The 1947 Vicksburg Billies finished with a 74–69 regular season record, placing fourth under Manager Buddy Blair. In the playoffs, the Pensacola Fliers defeated the Vicksburg Billies 2 games to 1. Season attendance was 99,512, an average of 1,392 per game.

The 1948 Vicksburg Billies made the Southeastern League playoffs again in 1948. Playing in the Class B league, Vicksburg finished with a 77–63 record. They were secondnd in the Southeastern League, managed by Buddy Blair. In the playoffs, the Jackson Senators beat the Vicksburg Billies 4 games to 3. Season attendance at City Park was 88,047, an average of 1,258.

Vicksburg advanced to the 1949 Southeastern League Finals. The 1949 Vicksburg Billies finished the Southeastern League regular season with a 68–66 record, placing fourth in the league. The manager was again Buddy Blair. In the playoffs, the Vicksburg Billies defeated the Meridian Millers 4 games to 3 and advanced. In the Southeastern League Finals, the Pensacola Fliers beat Vicksburg 4 games to 1. Vickburg's season attendance at City Park was 53,033.

The Vicksburg Billies played as a New York Giants affiliate in 1950. The 1950 Vicksburg Billies finished 63–63, placing fifth in the Southeastern League. Vicksburg did not qualify for the playoffs under Buddy Blair. Home attendance was 44,038. The Southeastern League folded after the 1950 season, affected by the Korean War.

=== Cotton States League (1955) ===
In 1955, the Vicksburg Hill Billies franchise reformed for one season. Vicksburg rejoined the six–team Class C Cotton States League as a Chicago Cubs affiliate in 1955. The Hill Billies had a 43–76 record and finished sixth in the Cotton States League. The 1955 manager was Fred Williams. Playing at City Park, the season attendance was 35,995. The Cotton States League permanently folded after the 1955 season.

Vicksburg has not hosted another minor league franchise.

(2016) Vicksburg area map. Vicksburg, Mississippi

== The ballparks ==
From 1902 to 1932, Vicksburg teams were noted to have played at Athletic Park. The ballpark had a capacity of 1,000 (1904). Athletic Park was four acres in size and was owned by the Vicksburg Railroad, Power and Manufacturing Company. The Chicago Cubs held their 1908 spring training in Vicksburg, likely utilizing Athletic Park. Athletic Park was located at Howard, Grove & Main Streets.

Vicksburg teams, between 1937 and 1955, were referenced to have hosted minor league games at City Park. City Park had a capacity of 2,800 in 1941 and 3,500 in 1950. The site later the housed the Vicksburg Street Department. The address of City Park was 815 China Street, Vicksburg, Mississippi.

== Notable alumni ==
- Billy Herman (1928) Inducted Baseball Hall of Fame, 1975
- Woody Abernathy (1928)
- Grady Adkins (1924–1925)
- Win Ballou (1922)
- Joe Berry (1929–1930)
- Josh Billings (1931)
- George Blackburn (1907–1908, MGR)
- Buddy Blair (1946–1950, MGR)
- John Brock (1930, MGR)
- Ray Brubaker (1937)
- Howie Camnitz (1903)
- Lou Chiozza (1931)
- Bruce Connatser (1926)
- Ralph Comstock (1911)
- Sam Covington (1925)
- Billy Earle (1903–1904, 1906, MGR)
- Bunny Fabrique (1926–1927, MGR)
- Kerby Farrell (1932)
- Jim Galloway (1910, 1912)
- Preston Gomez (1946–1947)
- Jim Hackett (1905)
- Ed Hahn (1902–1904)
- Jim Higgins (basketball) (1941)
- Buck Hooker (1906, MGR)
- Newt Hunter (1903)
- Joe Hutcheson (1926–1928)
- Pat Hynes (1903)
- Fred Johnson (1941)
- Dick Jones (1930, 1937)
- Jim Kelly (1928, MGR)
- Bob Kennedy (1937)
- Al Klawitter (1908)
- Al LaMacchia (1950)
- Bill Lewis (1924)
- Moxie Manuel (1903–1904)
- Hersh Martin (1932) MLB All-Star
- Sport McAllister (1893)
- Dick Midkiff (1947, 1949)
- Leo Norris (1927–1929)
- Patsy O'Rourke (1904)
- Charlie Perkins (1927)
- Pol Perritt (1912)
- Parson Perryman (1930)
- Rance Pless (1950)
- Joe Schepner (1931–1932, MGR)
- John Singleton (1930)
- Cy Slapnicka (1922)
- Woody Upchurch (1931)
- Al Vincent (1930)
- Gene Verble (1947)
- Dixie Walker (1929) 5x MLB All-Star
- Perry Werden (1906)
- Fred Williams (1955, MGR)
- Ducky Yount (1907)

== See also ==
- Category:Vicksburg (minor league baseball) players
- Category:Vicksburg Billies players
- Category:Vicksburg Hill Billies players
- Category:Vicksburg Hill Climbers players
