= Ed Hock =

American baseball player (1899–1963)

- Outfielder / Pinch runner
- Born: March 27, 1899; Franklin Furnace, Ohio, U.S.
- Died: November 21, 1963 (aged 64); Portsmouth, Ohio, U.S.
- Batted: Left Threw: Left

MLB debut
- July 8, 1920, for the St. Louis Cardinals

Last MLB appearance
- June 1, 1924, for the Cincinnati Reds

MLB statistics
- Games: 19
- At bats: 10
- hits: 1
- Stats at Baseball Reference

Teams
- St. Louis Cardinals (1920); Cincinnati Reds (1923–1924)

Edward Francis Hock (March 27, 1899 – November 11, 1963) was an American Major League Baseball player who played parts of three seasons for the St. Louis Cardinals and the Cincinnati Reds from 1920 to 1924. He had just one major league hit, but 3,474 in the minor leagues.
