= Mays Copeland =

American baseball player (1913–1982)

- Pitcher
- Born: August 31, 1913; Mountain View, Arkansas, U.S.
- Died: November 29, 1982 (aged 69); Indio, California, U.S.
- Batted: Right Threw: Right

MLB debut
- April 27, 1935, for the St. Louis Cardinals

Last MLB appearance
- April 27, 1935, for the St. Louis Cardinals

MLB statistics
- Win–loss record: 0–0
- Earned run average: 13.50
- Strikeouts: 0
- Stats at Baseball Reference

Teams
- St. Louis Cardinals (1935)

Mays Copeland (August 31, 1913 – November 29, 1982) was an American baseball pitcher. Born in 1913 in Mountain View, Arkansas, he played professional baseball in the St. Louis Cardinals organization from 1933 to 1936. He appeared in 68 professional games, compiling a 46–44 win–loss record.

During the 1933 season, he appeared in 41 games for the Springfield (MO) Cardinals and compiled a 17–12 record.

In April 1934, Springfield sold Copeland to the Houston club in the Texas League. He compiled a 16–10 record for Houston with a 3.65 earned run average (ERA).

After two successful seasons in the minor leagues, he was sold to the Cardinals in December 1934. He injured his arm in spring training camp, and appeared in only one game with the Cardinals on April 27, 1935, giving up two hits and allowing one earned run.

In May 1935, the Cardinals released Copeland to the Columbus Red Birds. He was reportedly sent to Columbus "to work out a 'sore arm'." Branch Rickey rated Copeland as his "No. 1 recruit," and his failure to deliver due to arm trouble was cited by Rickey as the No. 1 reason why the 1935 Cardinals failed to live up to expectations. He spent the rest of the 1935 season with Springfield and Houston.

He concluded his professional baseball career in 1936 with Springfield and the Houston Buffs. He was placed on the suspended list with a sore arm in 1937 and unsuccessfully attempted a comeback in 1938.

His twin brother, Hays Copeland, also played baseball and tried out with the Cardinals.

Copeland served in the U.S. Army during World War II. He was wounded in action in Belgium in December 1944.

Copeland died in 1982 in Indio, California, at age 69.
