= Shreveport Sports =

- 1925–1961; (1925–1935, 1938–1942, 1946–1957, 1959–1961); Shreveport, Louisiana

Minor league affiliations
- Class: Double-A (1946–1957, 1959–1961); Class A1 (1938–1942); Class C (1933–1935); Class A (1928–1932)
- League: Southern Association (1959–1961); Texas League (1938–1942, 1946–1957); West Dixie League (1935); East Dixie League (1934); Dixie League (1933); Texas League (1925–1932)

Major league affiliations
- Team: Kansas City Athletics (1959–1961); Chicago White Sox (1939, 1942, 1946); Boston Red Sox (1935); Detroit Tigers (1933–1934)

Minor league titles
- League titles (3): 1942; 1952; 1955

Team data
- Name: Shreveport Sports
- Ballpark: Texas League Park (1938–1942, 1946–1957); Beidenham Park (1925–1932)

The Shreveport Sports were a professional Minor League Baseball team based in Shreveport, Louisiana, in the United States. The Sports fielded a team from 1925 to 1935, 1938 to 1942, 1946 to 1957, and 1959 to 1961. From 1938, as a member of the Texas League, then the Southern Association, they played at the second-highest level of the minors: Class A1 (through 1942) and Double-A (after 1945). The team (and the Texas League itself) suspended operations from 1943 to 1945 during World War II.

When the farm system concept became widespread in the 1930s, the Sports were affiliated with the Detroit Tigers (1933–1934), Boston Red Sox (1935), Chicago White Sox (1939, 1942, 1946), and Kansas City Athletics (1959–1961). They were frequently operated independently of any Major League Baseball "parent club", including for 11 straight seasons between 1947 and 1957.

== History ==
Professional baseball has been played in Shreveport at various levels since 1895, including several teams named the Shreveport Sports :

- 1925–1932 — Shreveport Sports (Note: After their ballpark burned down, the 1932 team moved to Tyler, Texas, and finished the season as the Tyler Sports.) (Texas League)
- 1933 — Shreveport Sports (Dixie League)
- 1934 — Shreveport Sports (East Dixie League)
- 1935 — Shreveport Sports (West Dixie League)
- 1938–1942 — Shreveport Sports (Texas League)
- 1946–1957 — Shreveport Sports (Texas League)
- 1959–1961 — Shreveport Sports (Southern Association)

=== Championships ===
- 1942 Texas League championship
- 1952 Texas League championship
- 1955 Texas League championship

== Notable alumni ==
=== Hall of Fame inductees ===
- George Sisler
- Bill Terry
- Zack Wheat

=== Prominent major leaguers ===
- Roy Cullenbine
- Ray Hayworth
- Bill Henry
- Bobo Holloman
- Dick Howser
- Ken Hunt
- Jake Jones
- Bob Kennedy
- Jay Kirke
- Lou Klimchock
- Thornton Lee
- Eddie Lopat
- Pat Malone
- Benny McCoy
- Mel McGaha
- Wally Moses
- Billy Muffett
- Fredie Norman
- Salty Parker
- Claude Passeau
- Dave Philley
- Leo Posada
- Rip Radcliff
- José Santiago
- Mike Tresh
- Dave Wickersham
- Rudy York
