= Greenwood Dodgers =

- 1934–1952; Greenwood, Mississippi

Minor league affiliations
- Previous classes: Class C (1934–1940, 1947–1952)
- League: Cotton States League (1936–1940, 1947–1952)
- Previous leagues: East Dixie League (1934–1935)

Major league affiliations
- Previous teams: Brooklyn Dodgers (1938, 1947–1952); New York Giants (1936–1937); St. Louis Cardinals (1935); Detroit Tigers (1934)

Minor league titles
- League titles: 2 (1939, 1947)

Team data
- Previous names: Greenwood Dodgers (1947–1952); Greenwood Chocktaws (1940); Greenwood Crackers (1939); Greenwood Dodgers (1938); Greenwood Giants (1937); Greenwood Chiefs (1934–1936)

The Greenwood Dodgers were a minor league baseball team, affiliated with the Brooklyn Dodgers that was based in Greenwood, Mississippi. They played in the Cotton States League and operated from 1934 to 1940 and 1947 and 1952. The team won the league championship in 1947.

The team originated when the Shreveport Sports moved to Greenwood and became the Greenwood Chiefs in 1934. They changed their names to the Greenwood Giants in 1937, Greenwood Dodgers in 1937, Greenwood Crackers in 1939, Greenwood Chocktaws in 1940 and finally back to the Dodgers after the WWII hiatus ended in 1947.
