= Cecil Bolton =

American baseball player (1904–1993)

- First baseman
- Born: February 13, 1904; Booneville, Mississippi, U.S.
- Died: August 25, 1993 (aged 89); Jackson, Mississippi, U.S.
- Batted: Left Threw: Left

MLB debut
- September 21, 1928, for the Cleveland Indians

Last MLB appearance
- September 30, 1928, for the Cleveland Indians
- Stats at Baseball Reference

Teams
- Cleveland Indians (1928)

Cecil Glenford Bolton (February 13, 1904 – August 25, 1993) was an American Major League Baseball first baseman for the Cleveland Indians near the end of the 1928 season (September 21 – September 30). A native of Booneville, Mississippi, the 24-year-old rookie stood 6 ft 4 in (1.93 m) and weighed 195 lbs.

Bolton had two hits in thirteen at bats (.154), but both hits were triples, giving him a slugging percentage of .462. He shares the record with Ed Irvin for most triples in a career with no other hits at two. He scored one run. At first base, he handled 42 out of 44 chances successfully for a .955 fielding percentage.
