= Hugo Klaerner =

American baseball player (1908–1982)

- Pitcher
- Born: October 15, 1908; Fredericksburg, Texas, U.S.
- Died: January 3, 1982 (aged 73); Fredericksburg, Texas, U.S.
- Batted: Right Threw: Right

MLB debut
- September 10, 1934, for the Chicago White Sox

Last MLB appearance
- September 22, 1934, for the Chicago White Sox

MLB statistics
- Win–loss record: 0-2
- Earned run average: 10.90
- Strikeouts: 9
- Stats at Baseball Reference

Teams
- Chicago White Sox (1934)

Hugo Emil Klaerner (October 15, 1908 – January 3, 1982) was an American professional pitcher in Major League Baseball. He played for the Chicago White Sox. He married Esther Petermann (d. 2009), and is buried in Der Stadt Friedhof Cemetery in Fredericksburg.
