= Fort Walton Beach Jets =

Fort Walton Jets
- 1953–1962; Fort Walton Beach, Florida

Minor league affiliations
- Class: Class D (1953–1962)
- League: Alabama–Florida League (1953–1962)

Major league affiliations
- Team: Minnesota Twins (1961–1962); Washington Senators (1956–1960); Cincinnati Reds (1954–1955)

Team data
- Ballpark: Jet Stadium

The Fort Walton Jets were a professional minor league baseball team based in Fort Walton Beach, Florida from 1953 until 1962. The club played in the Class-D Alabama–Florida League. The team played their home games at Jet Stadium.
