= Lena Styles =

American baseball player (1899–1956)

- Catcher
- Born: November 27, 1899; Gurley, Alabama, U.S.
- Died: March 14, 1956 (aged 56); Huntsville, Alabama, U.S.
- Batted: Right Threw: Right

MLB debut
- September 10, 1919, for the Philadelphia Athletics

Last MLB appearance
- September 27, 1931, for the Cincinnati Reds

MLB statistics
- Batting average: .250
- Home runs: 0
- Runs batted in: 16
- Stats at Baseball Reference

Teams
- Philadelphia Athletics (1919–1921); Cincinnati Reds (1930–1931)

William Graves "Lena" Styles (November 27, 1899 – March 14, 1956) was an American professional baseball catcher. He played in Major League Baseball over parts of five seasons (1919–21, 1930–31) with the Philadelphia Athletics and Cincinnati Reds. For his career, he compiled a .250 batting average in 176 at-bats and drove in 16 runs.

An alumnus of the University of Alabama, he was born in Gurley, Alabama, and died in Huntsville, Alabama from cancer, at the age of 56.
