= Culley Rikard =

American baseball player and coach (1914–2000)

- Outfielder
- Born: May 9, 1914; Oxford, Mississippi, U.S.
- Died: February 25, 2000 (aged 85); Memphis, Tennessee, U.S.
- Batted: Left Threw: Right

MLB debut
- September 20, 1941, for the Pittsburgh Pirates

Last MLB appearance
- September 25, 1947, for the Pittsburgh Pirates

MLB statistics
- Batting average: .270
- Home runs: 4
- Runs batted in: 37
- Stats at Baseball Reference

Teams
- Pittsburgh Pirates (1941–42, 1947)

Culley Rikard (May 9, 1914 – February 25, 2000) was an American professional baseball player. He played three seasons in Major League Baseball, 1941, 1942, and 1947, with the Pittsburgh Pirates of the National League, primarily as an outfielder.

After a handful of games as a pinch hitter the first two seasons, he was drafted for World War II before the 1943 season.

His best season was in 1947 when he played in 109 games with 324 at bats as a fourth outfielder. He batted .287 with four home runs and 32 runs batted in. On June 5, 1947, in a game against the Brooklyn Dodgers he hit a line drive to center field. All-Star outfielder Pete Reiser caught the ball, but collided with the Ebbets Field wall, knocking him unconscious. Reiser famously received last rites by the Catholic Church, but eventually managed to recover with a concussion. The injury also caused a case of vertigo which damaged his career.

Rikard was released to Indianapolis of the American Association after the 47 season. Rikard was later traded to the Pacific Coast League San Francisco Seals during the 1949 season for Dino Restelli.

Rikard was married to Lena Elizabeth Broadway, and had three children.

Rikard died in Memphis, Tennessee.
