= Lebanon Pretzel Eaters =

- 1892; Lebanon, Pennsylvania

Minor league affiliations
- Class: Class B (1892)
- League: Pennsylvania State League (1892)

Major league affiliations
- Team: None

Minor league titles
- League titles (0): None

Team data
- Name: Lebanon Pretzel Eaters (1892)
- Ballpark: Penryn Park (1892)

The Lebanon Pretzel Eaters were a minor league baseball team based in Lebanon, Pennsylvania. In 1892, the Pretzel Eaters played a partial season as members of the Class B level Pennsylvania State League, hosting minor league home games at Penryn Park. The team folded before the end of the Pennsylvania State League season.

== History ==
Lebanon first hosted minor league baseball when the 1899 "Lebanon" team played as members of the Middle States League. The Lebanon team, continued play in 1890 as members of the Atlantic Association. In 1891, the Lebanon Cedars played as members of the Eastern Association.

The Cedars did not return to Eastern Association play in 1892. Instead, Lebanon continued play in a new league, as the "Lebanon Pretzel Eaters" became charter members of the Class B level Pennsylvania State League, continuing play at Penryn Park.

The "Pretzel Eaters" nickname corresponds with the amusement amenities within Penryn Park, which hosted the team.

The Allentown Colts, Altoona Mountaineers, Easton, Harrisburg Ponies, Johnstown Pirates, Reading Actives and Wilkes-Barre Coal Barons teams joined Lebanon in beginning Pennsylvania State League play on May 23, 1892.

On July 21, 1892, the Lebanon Pretzel Eaters folded. Lebanon ended their Pennsylvania State League play with a record of 22-25. George Carman served as manager in the shortened season.

Lebanon next hosted minor league baseball in 1902, when the Lebanon team returned to Pennsylvania State League play.

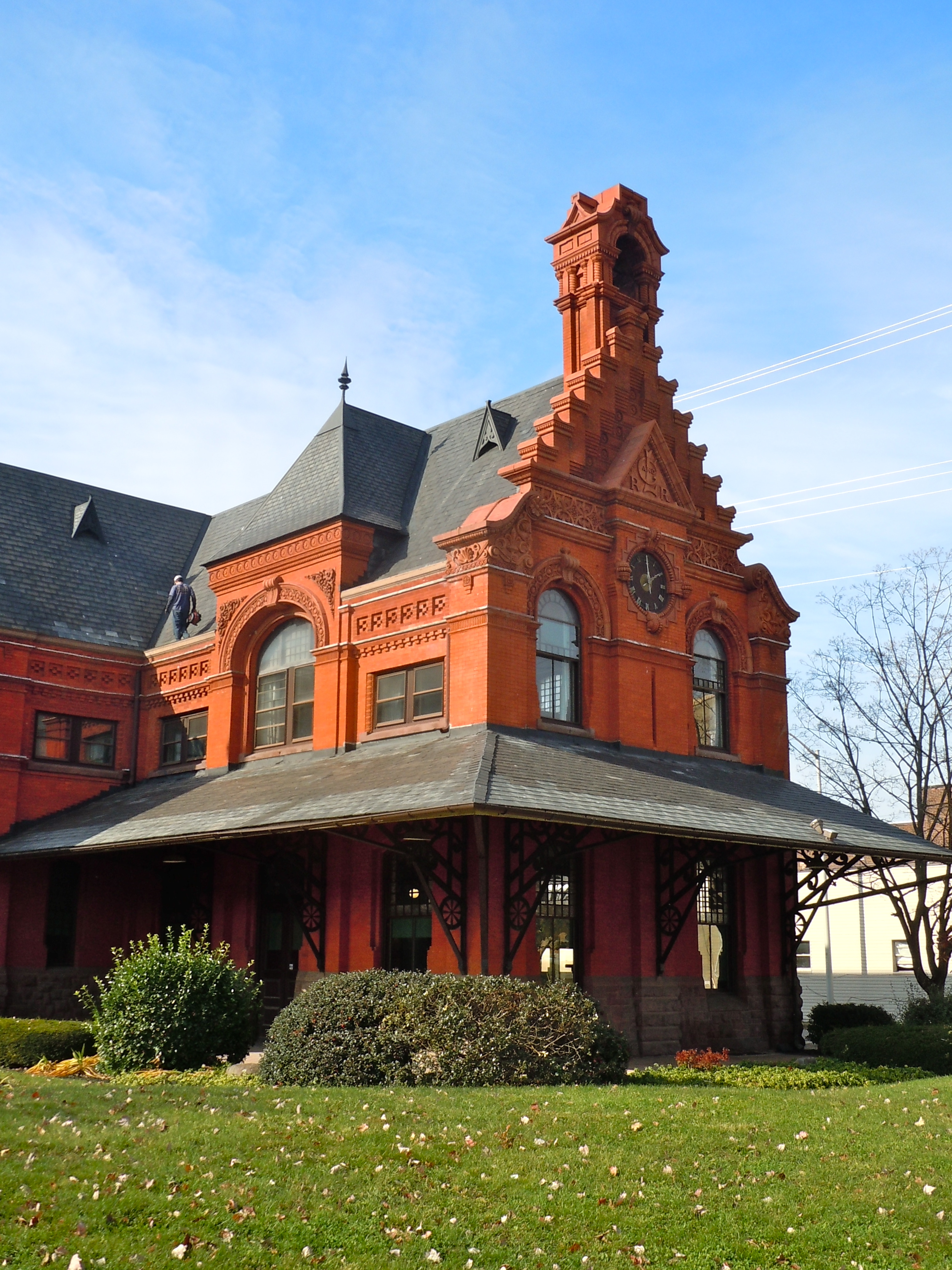
(2011) Cornwell and Lebanon Railroad Station, constructed in 1885. National Register of Historic Places.

== The ballpark ==
The Lebanon Pretzel Eaters hosted home minor league home games at Penryn Park. Penryn Park opened in 1885 in Lebanon as a public park. The park was built by the railroad to attract visitors and increase railroad passenger use of the Cornwall and Lebanon Railroad system serving Lebanon . Penryn Park contained the Cornwell and Lebanon Railroad Station, which still exists today. Penryn Park flooded in July, 1925 and never returned to use as a public park.

In August 1889, the Penryn Park hosted four integrated games between the Cuban Giants and Lebanon Grays teams.

The Cornwell and Lebanon Railroad Station was constructed in 1885 and is still in use, listed on the National Register of Historic Places. Today, the former station is used as a commercial business, located at 161 North 8th Street.

== Year–by–year record ==
Year	Record	Finish	Manager	Playoffs/Notes
1892	22–25	NA	George Carman	Team disbanded July 21

== Notable alumni ==
- George Carman (1892, MGR)
- Bill Fagan (1892)
- Jack Fee (1892)
- Ed Knouff (1892)
- Jerry McCormick (1892)
- John Riddle (1892)
- Frank West (1892)

=== See also ===
Lebanon Pretzel Eaters players
