= Allentown Red Sox =

- 1958–1960; Allentown, Pennsylvania

Minor league affiliations
- Previous classes: Class A (1958–1960)
- League: Eastern League

Major league affiliations
- Previous teams: Boston Red Sox (1958–1960)

Team data
- Previous parks: Max Hess Stadium; 40°37′47″N 075°29′00″W

The Allentown Red Sox (A-Sox) were a minor league baseball team, affiliated with the Boston Red Sox and based in Allentown, Pennsylvania, that played from 1958 through 1960 in the Eastern League. At that time, the Eastern League was officially Class A, but, prior to the minor-league classification realignment that took place in 1963, that level was almost equivalent to Double-A.

== History ==
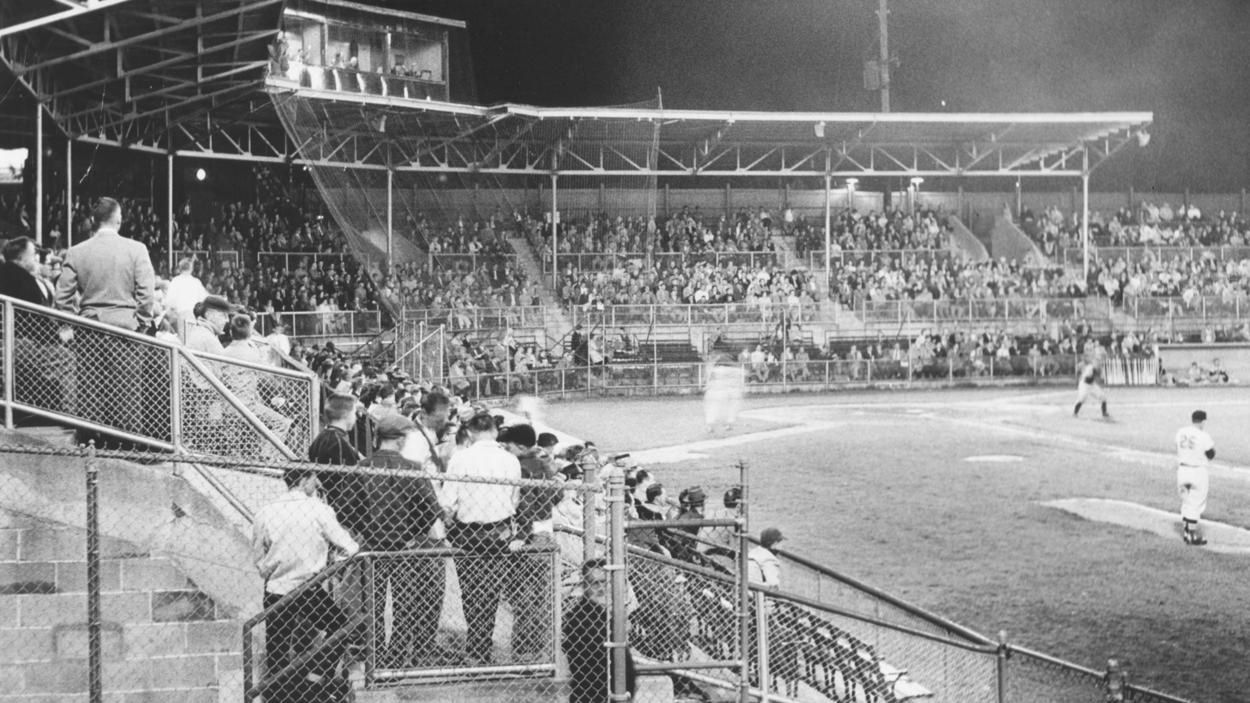
1960 Allentown Red Sox game at Max Hess Stadium in Allentown, Pennsylvania

From 1939 through 1952, Allentown had hosted a Class B Interstate League franchise, the Cardinals—also the Dukes, FleetWings and Wings—and for much of that period, it was an affiliate of the namesake St. Louis Cardinals. When the Interstate loop folded, the Cardinals returned to Allentown in 1954 as a member of the Eastern League for three seasons, through 1956.

The Allentown Red Sox franchise dates to 1933 as the Reading Phillies. It became a farm team for the Red Sox in 1938 as the Hazleton (PA) Red Sox. In 1957, the Red Sox purchased the former Detroit Tigers Eastern League team, the Syracuse Chiefs, and moved the club to Allentown mid-season, being operated as an unaffiliated team for the balance of the season. The Red Sox ended their affiliation with their Eastern League team in Albany, New York after the season and reassigned it to Allentown for the 1958 season.

Owned by Joe Buzas, the team played for three seasons at Max Hess Stadium (formerly Breadon Field), owned by Max Hess, Jr., owner of the Allentown Hess Brothers department store. Former Allentown player Tracy Stallard is remembered as the pitcher who served up Roger Maris' 61st home run in 1961 while playing for Boston. Another player who appeared at the stadium was Curt Simmons, a native of Egypt, Pennsylvania, who pitched at Max Hess Stadium in a rehab assignment for the Asheville (NC) Tourists, a farm team of the Philadelphia Phillies. The presence of Curt Simmons filled up the stands. For the 1960 season, Bob Heffner, who graduated from Allentown High School as a two-sport letterman in 1957 played for the A-Sox. He had the best pitching record on the club at 16-9. Heffner later played in the majors for the Red Sox, Cleveland Indians and California Angels in 1968.

The A-Sox's best season was 1960. On September 3, 1960, the Red Sox kept its Eastern League playoff hopes alive with a 7-6, 3-2 sweep of Williamsport at Hess Stadium, the second of four straight doubleheaders the A-Sox played to close out the season. Two days later, Allentown's playoff bid ended in a 5-4, 11-inning defeat at Springfield in the first game of a Labor Day doubleheader. The holiday crowd of 1,297 at Hess Stadium witnessed the last professional baseball game in Allentown for 37 years.

== Legacy ==
After the 1960 season, the team was relocated due to a lack of attendance (average of 650 fans per game in 1960), the team moved to Johnstown, Pennsylvania on December 5, 1960, for the 1961 season played as the Johnstown Red Sox at Point Stadium. Over subsequent seasons, the club has remained in the Eastern League under different names in various cities:

- 1962 York White Roses, York, Pennsylvania (Class A)
- 1963–1964 Reading Red Sox, Reading, Pennsylvania (Double-A hereafter)
- 1965–1969 Pittsfield Red Sox, Pittsfield, Massachusetts
- 1970–1972 Pawtucket Red Sox, Pawtucket, Rhode Island
- 1973–1982 Bristol Red Sox, Bristol, Connecticut
- 1983–1994 New Britain Red Sox, New Britain, Connecticut
- 1995–2015 Hardware City/New Britain Rock Cats, New Britain, Connecticut (affiliated with Minnesota Twins, then Colorado Rockies)
- 2016– Hartford Yard Goats, Hartford, Connecticut (Colorado Rockies)

The Red Sox parted company with the franchise in 1995, signing a player development contract with the Trenton Thunder. Since 2003, the Portland Sea Dogs have been Boston's affiliate in the Eastern League.

== Seasons ==
- 1958 Season

Won: 51 Lost: 83 Pct: .381 4th Place Eastern Division, 24 GB
Manager: Eddie Popowski

| Pos | Player | Avg | Pos | Player | W-L | ERA |
|---|---|---|---|---|---|---|
| 1B | Matthew Daskalakis | .273 | SP | Albert Antinelli | 7-10 | 4.04 |
| 2B | Douglas Hubacek | .305 | SP | Walt Payne | 8-9 | 4.11 |
| SS | Al Moran | .206 | SP | John Issac | 10-9 | 4.01 |
| 3B | Ed Lavene | .249 | SP | Leverette Spencer | 4-8 | 3.33 |
| C | Don Gile | .274 | SP | Ronald Jirsa | 2-12 | 4.02 |
| OF | Jerry Mallett | .233 | SP | Edwin Binder | 3-5 | 3.14 |
| OF | Jim Tolleson | .226 | RP | Larry Kendig | 4-4 | 3.73 |
| OF | John Siegert | .245 | RP | Jack Thomas | 3-4 | 6.29 |

1958 Complete Team Statistics

- 1959 Season

Won: 82 Lost: 59 Pct: .582 2nd Place, 3 GB
Manager: Sheriff Robinson
Attendance: 84,000

| Pos | Player | Avg | Pos | Player | W-L | ERA |
|---|---|---|---|---|---|---|
| 1B | Daniel Lynk | .299 | SP | Albert Antinelli | 17-9 | 3.83 |
| 2B | Marlan Coughtry | .296 | SP | Ronald Cote | 14-12 | 3.89 |
| SS | Andrew Madalone | .276 | SP | Hal Kolstad | 12-13 | 3.64 |
| 3B | Matthew Sczesny | .266 | SP | William Thom | 5-3 | 4.11 |
| C | Bob Tillman | .272 | SP | Tracy Stallard | 9-4 | 1.68 |
| OF | Jerry Mallett | .278 | RP | Jay Richie | 9-5 | 1.90 |
| OF | Richard McCarthy | .281 | RP | Ralph Birkofer | 6-1 | 3.60 |
| OF | Ezell King | .242 | RP | Arnold Early | 2-5 | 2.86 |

1959 Complete Team Statistics

- 1960 Season

Won: 67 Lost: 72 Pct: .482 5th Place, 9 GB
Manager: Sheriff Robinson
Attendance: 51,654

| Pos | Player | Avg | Pos | Player | W-L | ERA |
|---|---|---|---|---|---|---|
| 1B | Joseph Pedrazzini | .285 | SP | Bob Heffner | 16-9 | 3.23 |
| 2B | Marlan Coughtry | .308 | SP | William Thom | 14-7 | 4.47 |
| SS | John Jenson | .275 | SP | Ben Tench | 3-9 | 4.95 |
| 3B | Ted Schreiber | .257 | SP | Guido Grilli | 9-5 | 3.31 |
| C | Robert Hoffer | .225 | SP | Stan Willis | 2-9 | 6.04 |
| OF | Robert Fidler | .268 | SP | Tracy Stallard | 4-5 | 4.82 |
| OF | Richard McCarthy | .295 | RP | George Moton | 8-7 | 3.13 |
| OF | Paul Jernigan | .245 | RP | Ronald Cote | 8-7 | 4.73 |

1960 Complete Team Statistics

== Major league players ==
- Joe Albanese, 1958
  Washington Senators, AL, 1958
- Al Cihocki, 1958
  Cleveland Indians, AL, 1945
- Galen Cisco, 1959
  Boston Red Sox, AL, 1961, 1967
  New York Mets, NL, 1963-1964
  Kansas City Royals, AL, 1969
- Marlan Coughtry, 1959, 1960
  Boston Red Sox, AL, 1960
  Los Angeles Angels, AL, 1962
  Kansas City Athletics, AL, 1962
  Cleveland Indians, AL, 1962
- Arnold Earley, 1959
  Boston Red Sox, AL, 1960-1965
  Chicago Cubs, NL, 1966
  Houston Astros, NL, 1967
- Don Gile, 1958, 1959
  Boston Red Sox, AL, 1959-1962
- Guido Grilli, 1960
  Boston Red Sox, AL, 1966
  Kansas City Athletics, AL, 1966
- Bob Heffner, 1959, 1960
  Boston Red Sox, AL, 1963-1965
  Cleveland Indians, AL, 1966
- Jim Kirby, 1958
  Chicago Cubs, NL, 1940
- Hal Kolstad, 1959
  Boston Red Sox, AL, 1962-1963
- Jerry Mallett, 1958, 1959, 1960
  Boston Red Sox, AL, 1959
- Al Moran, 1958, 1959, 1960
  New York Mets, NL, 1963-1964
- Jim Pagliaroni, 1958
  Boston Red Sox, AL, 1960-1962
  Pittsburgh Pirates, NL, 1963-1967
  Oakland Athletics, AL, 1967
  Seattle Pilots, AL, 1969
- Bill Pleis, 1958
  Minnesota Twins, 1961-1966
- Jay Ritchie, 1958, 1959
  Boston Red Sox, AL, 1964-1965
  Atlanta Braves, NL, 1966-1967
  Cincinnati Reds, NL, 1968
- Ted Schreiber, 1959, 1960
  New York Mets, NL, 1963
- Tracy Stallard, 1959, 1960
  Boston Red Sox, AL, 1960-1962
  New York Mets, NL, 1963-1964
  St. Louis Cardinals, NL, 1965-1966
- Bob Tillman, 1959
  Boston Red Sox, AL, 1962-1967
  New York Yankees, AL, 1967
  Atlanta Braves, NL, 1968-1970

== See also ==
- Sports in Allentown, Pennsylvania
- History of baseball in Allentown, Pennsylvania
