= Lebanon Cedars =

- 1891; Lebanon, Pennsylvania

Minor league affiliations
- Class: Class A (1891)
- League: Eastern Association (1891)

Major league affiliations
- Team: None

Minor league titles
- League titles (0): None

Team data
- Name: Lebanon Cedars (1891)
- Ballpark: Penryn Park (1891)

The Lebanon Cedars were a minor league baseball team based in Lebanon, Pennsylvania. In 1891, the Cedars played as members of the Class A level Eastern Association, the highest level of minor leagues in the era. The Cedars hosted minor league home games at Penryn Park.

== History ==
Lebanon first hosted minor league baseball with the Lebanon team of the 1889 Middle States League. The Lebanon Cedars were immediately preceded by the 1890 Lebanon team, which played as members of the Atlantic Association.

In 1891, minor league baseball continued in Lebanon, as the Lebanon "Cedars" became members of the Eastern Association. The Eastern Association formed as a Class A level league, the highest level of minor league baseball in the era, playing under the leadership of league president Charles D. White. The Albany Senators, Buffalo Bisons, New Haven Nutmegs, Providence Clamdiggers, Rochester Hop Bitters, Syracuse Stars and Troy Trojans teams joined the Cedars in beginning league play on April 26, 1891.

The "Cedars" nickname corresponds to both the Cedar of Lebanon a species of wood, also referenced in the Bible and the timber industry in Lebanon in the era.

The Lebanon Cedars ended the 1891 Eastern Association season with a record of 48-73, placing fourth in the final standings. Joseph McAllister, Jim Randall and James Farrington served as the Lebanon managers during the season. Lebanon finished last of the four remaining teams, finishing 37.0 games behind the first place Buffalo Bisons in the final standings, as the New Haven, Providence, Rochester and Syracuse teams each folded before completing the season. 21 players on the 1891 Lebanon Cedars' roster advanced to play in the major leagues.

The Lebanon franchise did not return to Eastern Association play in 1892. Lebanon instead joined a new league and continued play as the Lebanon Pretzel Eaters, who became charter members of the Class B level Pennsylvania State League. The Pretzel Eaters team continued hosting minor league home games at Penryn Park.

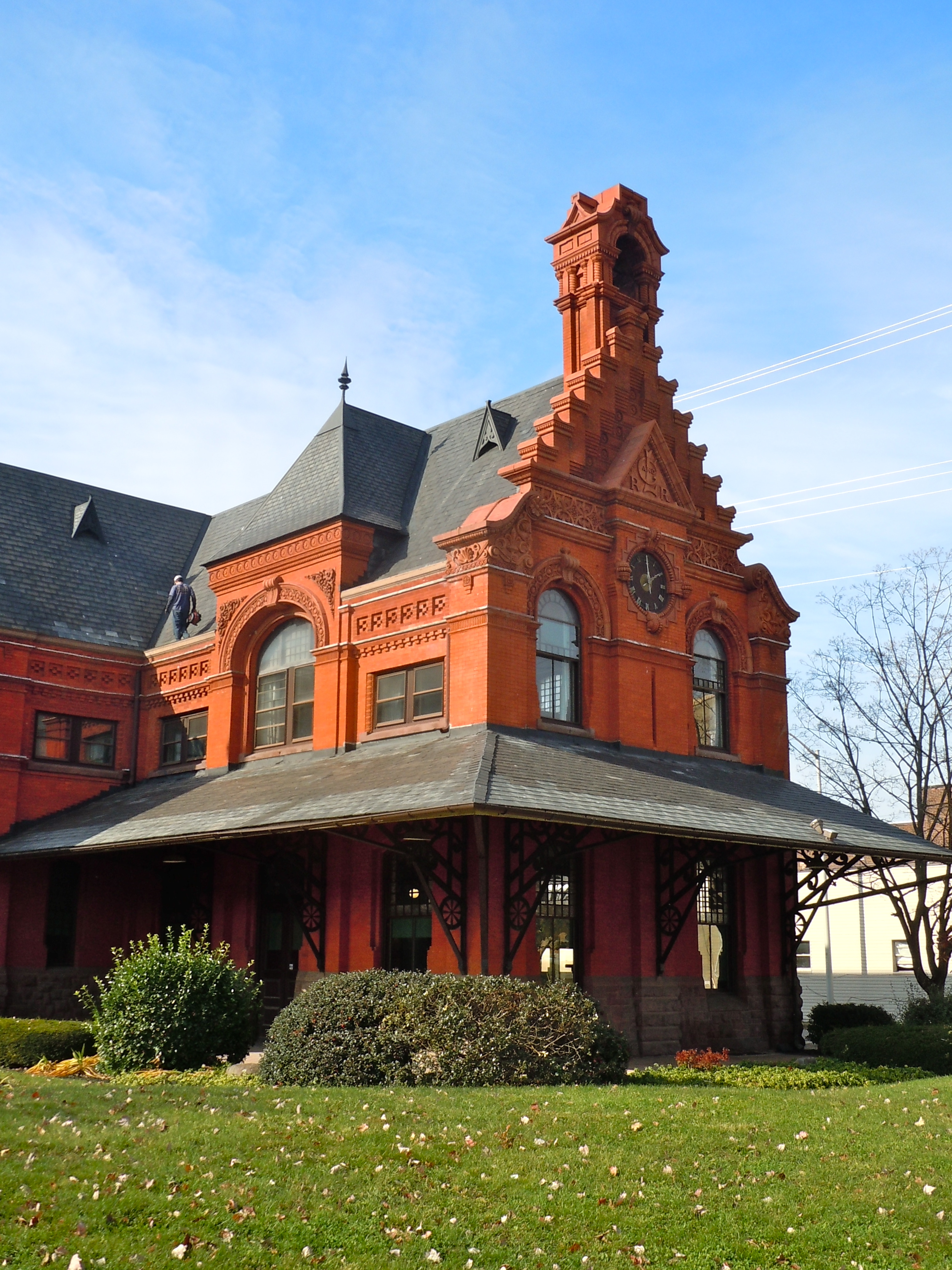
(2011) Cornwell and Lebanon Railroad Station, constructed in 1885. National Register of Historic Places.

== The ballpark ==
The Lebanon Cedars hosted their 1891 home minor league home games at Penryn Park. Penryn Park was first created in 1885 in Lebanon as a public park. The park was intended to attract visitors and increase railroad passenger use of the Cornwall and Lebanon Railroad system serving Lebanon and was constructed by the railroad. Penryn Park contained a railroad station to serve the passengers, which still exists today. Penryn Park was flooded in July, 1925 and never reopened as a public park.

In August 1889, the park hosted four integrated games between the Cuban Giants and Lebanon Grays teams.

The Cornwell and Lebanon Railroad Station, constructed in 1885, is listed on the National Register of Historic Places. Today, the former station is used as a commercial business and is located at 161 North 8th Street.

== Year–by–year record ==
Year	Record	Finish	Manager	Playoffs/Notes
1891	48–73	4th	Joseph McAllister / Jim Randall; James Farrington	No playoffs held

== Notable alumni ==
- Dave Anderson (1891)
- Doc Bushong (1891)
- Bill Clymer (1891)
- Ben Conroy (1891)
- Fred Cooke (1891)
- Monte Cross (1891)
- Sun Daly (1891)
- Ira Davis (1891)
- Alexander Donoghue (1891)
- Herb Goodall (1891)
- Bill Greenwood (1891)
- Belden Hill (1891)
- Sparrow McCaffrey (1891)
- Jerry McCormick (1891)
- John Meister (1891)
- Joe Neale (1891)
- Tom O'Brien (1891)
- John Peltz (1891)
- Harry Sage (1891)
- Pop Tate (1891)
- Jack Taylor (1891)

== See also ==
Lebanon Cedars players
