= Allentown Chiefs =

- 1957–1957; Allentown, Pennsylvania

Minor league affiliations
- Previous classes: Class A (1957)
- League: Eastern League

Major league affiliations
- Previous teams: unaffiliated (Independent)

Team data
- Previous parks: Breadon Field; 40°37′47″N 075°29′00″W

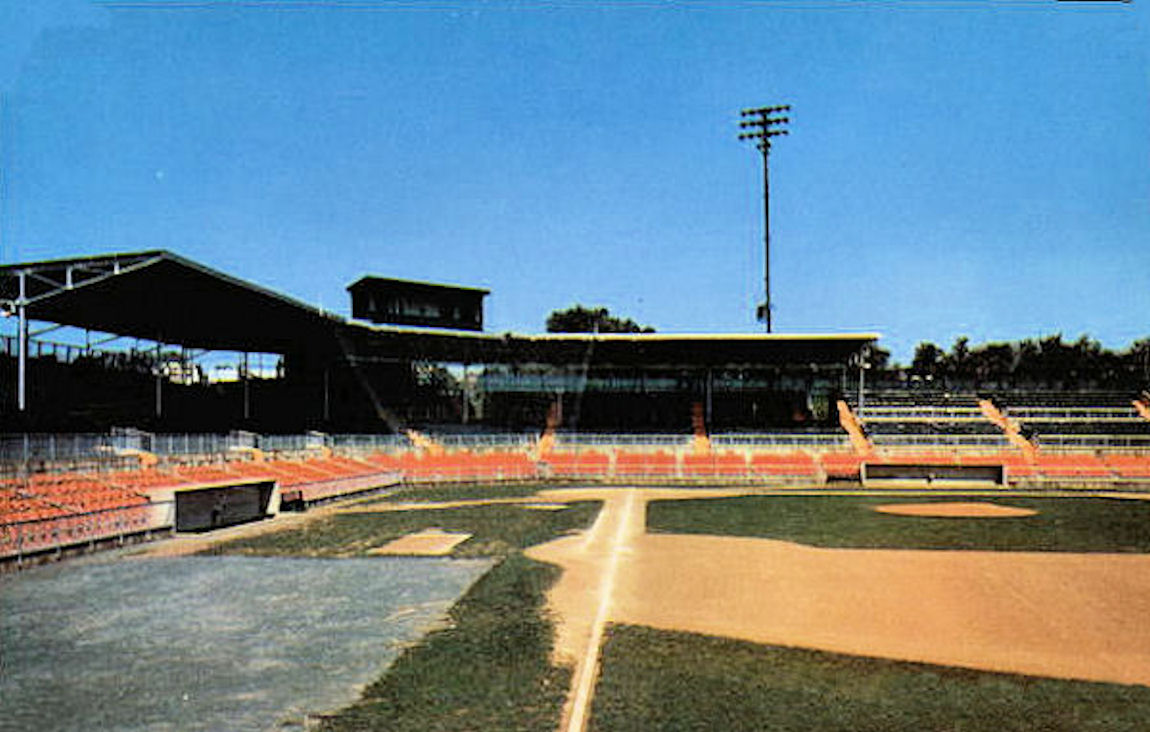
Breadon Field, looking south to north along the first base line, about 1960. The press box is above the roof over the stands.

The Allentown Chiefs were a minor league baseball team. They played in the Class A Eastern League, and started the 1957 season in Syracuse, New York. The team was purchased by the Boston Red Sox and was moved to Allentown, Pennsylvania, mid-season on July 13, 1957, and finished the season playing at Breadon Field in Whitehall Township, just north of Allentown.

The 1957 team was not affiliated with any major league team, however, the Chiefs were a longtime affiliate of the Detroit Tigers prior to the 1957 season. After finishing the season in Allentown, the team was re-designated as the Allentown Red Sox, with Boston moving their Eastern League Class A team from Albany, New York, to Allentown for the 1958 season.

A new Detroit-affiliated team in Lancaster, Pennsylvania, began operations for the 1958 Eastern League season.

== Team ==
- 1957 Season (Combined Syracuse/Allentown)

Won: 56 Lost: 84 Pct: .400 5th Place Eastern Division, 19 GB
Manager: Frank Calo

Pos	Player	Avg	Pos	Player	W-L	ERA
1B	Edward Kneuper	.263	SP	Leverette Spencer	16-14	2.90
2B	Clell Hobson	.230	SP	John Isaac	9-10	5.05
SS	Julio Palazzini	.279	SP	George Aitken	9-13	4.97
3B	Tom Sarna	.253	SP	John Wall	7-10	4.50
C	Jim Tolleson	.249	SP	Cliff Ross	3-15	5.32
OF	Jerry Elder	.223	SP	Marv Rotblatt	8-5	4.01
OF	Andrew Rellick	.248	SP	Ralph Birkofer	2-8	4.90
OF	Jim Kirby	.267	RP	Larry Kendig	2-6	3.36

1957 Complete Team Statistics

== Major league players ==
- Jim Kirby

Chicago Cubs, NL, 1949

- Bob Moorhead

New York Mets, NL, 1962, 1965

- John Romonosky

Chicago White Sox, AL, 1948, 1950, 1951

- Cliff Ross

Cincinnati Reds, NL, 1954

- Marv Rotblatt

Chicago White Sox, AL, 1948, 1950, 1951

== See also ==
- Sports in Allentown, Pennsylvania
- History of baseball in Allentown, Pennsylvania
