= Coca-Cola Park (disambiguation) =

Coca-Cola Park is a ballpark in Allentown, Pennsylvania, United States.

Coca-Cola Park may also refer to:

- Ellis Park Stadium, Johannesburg, South Africa, known as Coca-Cola Park from 2008-2012

== See also ==
- Sahlen Field, known as Coca-Cola Field from 2009 to 2018
