= Pennsylvania State League =

Minor league baseball league (1892-1895)

- Classification: Independent (1892–1895)
- Sport: Minor League Baseball
- First season: 1892
- Folded: 1895
- Replaced by: Atlantic League
- President: J. Monroe Kreiter (1892); Henry B. Diddlebock (1893); E.K. Meyers (1894); A.L. Johnson (1894); John H. Hanlon (1894–1895)
- No. of teams: 6
- Country: United States of America
- Most titles: 1 Wilkes-Barre Coal Barons (1892); Johnstown Terrors (1893); Pottsville Colts (1894); Hazleton Quay-kers (1895)

The Pennsylvania State League was an American minor league baseball sports league that operated from 1892 to 1895, then became the first Atlantic League. The league member teams were exclusively based in Pennsylvania.

== Cities represented ==
- Allentown, PA: Allentown Colts 1892–1893; Allentown Kelly's Killers 1894; Allentown Goobers 1895; Allentown 1895
- Altoona, PA: Altoona 1892; Altoona Mud Turtles 1893; Altoona 1894
- Ashland, PA: Ashland 1894
- Carbondale, PA: Carbondale Anthracites 1895
- Danville, PA: Danville 1892–1893
- Easton, PA: Easton Dutchmen 1893–1894; Easton 1894
- Harrisburg, PA: Harrisburg Hustlers 1893; Harrisburg Senators 1894–1895
- Hazleton, PA: Hazleton Barons 1894; Hazleton Quay-kers 1895
- Johnstown, PA: Johnstown Johnnies 1892; Johnstown Terrors 1893
- Lancaster, PA: Lancaster Chicks 1894–1895
- Lebanon, PA: Lebanon Pretzel Eaters 1892
- Philadelphia, PA: Philadelphia Colts 1894
- Pottsville, PA: Pottsville Colts 1894–1895
- Reading, PA: Reading Actives 1892; Reading Actives 1893–1895; Reading 1895
- Scranton, PA: Scranton Miners 1892–1893; Scranton Indians 1894
- Shenandoah, PA: Shenandoah 1894; Shenandoah Huns 1895
- Wilkes-Barre, PA: Wilkes-Barre Coal Barons 1892
- York, PA: York White Roses 1893

== Standings and statistics ==
1892 Pennsylvania State League

Team standings	W	L	PCT	GB	Managers
Wilkes-Barre Coal Barons	24	9	.727	–	James Randall
Allentown Colts	24	12	.667	1½	John Hanlon
Altoona Colts	23	15	.606	3½	Alexander Donahue
Johnstown Johnnies	21	15	.583	4½	Thayer Torreyson
Danville	9	22	.290	14	NA
Scranton Miners	5	26	.161	18	NA
Reading Actives	8	11	.445	NA	NA
Lebanon Pretzel Eaters	4	8	.333	NA	Bill Sharsig

Lebanon and Reading disbanded.

Player statistics
Player	Team	Stat	Tot	Player	Team	Stat	Tot
John Coleman	Lebanon	BA	.362	George Shaffer	Altoona	Hits	99
George Shaffer	Altoona	Runs	60	Jack Drauby	Wilkes-Barre	Runs	60

1893 Pennsylvania State League

Team standings	W	L	PCT	GB	Managers
Easton	70	36	.660	–	Jay Faatz
Johnstown Terrors	62	39	.614	5½	Thayer Torreyson
Altoona Mud Turtles	57	41	.582	9	Alexander Donahue
Allentown Colts	57	46	.563	11½	John Hanlon
Harrisburg Hustlers	49	52	.485	18½	Felix Marks
York White Roses	51	55	.481	19	William Stevens / Bill Sharsig
Scranton Miners	45	57	.441	23	Martin Swift
Danville / Reading Actives	16	81	.165	49½	Art McCoy / Elias Maier / William Whitman

Danville (5–47) moved to Reading July 7.
Playoff: Johnstown 3 games, Easton 2. Easton refused to continue the series.

Player statistics
Player	Team	Stat	Tot	Player	Team	Stat	Tot
Fred Betts	Easton	BA	.402	John Lyston	Altoona/Harrisburg	W	24
Herman Pitz	Scranton	Runs	127	Jack Fee	Scranton/Allentown	SO	134
Fred Betts	Easton	Hits	150	Henry Miller	Harrisburg	Pct	.762: 16-5
Scoops Carey	Altoona	HR	10	John Slagle	Easton	Pct	.762: 16-5
Ace Stewart	Easton	HR	10				

1894 Pennsylvania State League

Team standings	W	L	PCT	GB	Managers
Pottsville Colts	62	44	.585	-	Phenomenal Smith
Harrisburg Senators	56	45	.554	3½	Jack Huston
Reading Actives	61	50	.550	3½	William Whitman
Allentown Kelly's Killers / Easton Dutchmen / Ashland	53	46	.535	5½	King Kelly / John Milligan
Hazleton Barons	53	53	.500	9	Bill Sharsig
Scranton Indians / Shenandoah	55	55	.500	9	Jim Brennan
Altoona / Lancaster Chicks	51	54	.486	10½	A.T. Bentley / Jim Donahue
Easton Dutchmen / Philadelphia Colts	40	74	.351	26	Bill Parks / Charlie Levis

Easton (8–36) moved to Philadelphia July 4; Altoona (17–31) moved to Lancaster July 7; Scranton (45–28) was replaced by Shenandoah August 12; Allentown (53–29) was replaced by Easton August 16; Easton (0–8) moved to Ashland Sept. 1.
Playoff: Pottsville defeated Harrisburg in a disputed title game.

Player statistics
Player	Team	Stat	Tot	Player	Team	Stat	Tot
John Walters	Allentown	BA	.383	Bill Massey	Scranton/Philadelphia	Hits	176
Tom Golden	Pottsville	Runs	145	Henry Cole	Altoona/Lancaster	HR	21

1895 Pennsylvania State League

Team standings	W	L	PCT	GB	Managers
Hazleton Quay-kers	61	44	.581	–	Bill Sharsig
Carbondale Anthracites	55	48	.533	5	M. Swift
Lancaster Chicks	49	54	.476	11	A.T. Bentley
Pottsville Colts / Allentown/ Reading	44	64	.407	18½	Phenomenal Smith
Allentown Goobers	29	28	.509	NA	John Milligan
Reading	37	27	.578	NA	William Whitman
Harrisburg Senators	19	16	.543	NA	Frank Seiss / Jim Donahue
Shenandoah Huns	1	14	.067	NA	Jim Brennan / Charlie Levis

Shenandoah disbanded May 20; Harrisburg disbanded June 20; Reading disbanded July 20; Allentown disbanded July 24; Pottsville (35–33) moved to Allentown July 27; Allentown (5–7) moved to Reading August 10.
Playoff: None Scheduled

Player statistics
Player	Team	Stat	Tot	Player	Team	Stat	Tot
John Milligan	Allentown/Reading	BA	.457	Bill Massey	Carbondale	Hits	174
Gus Moran	Hazleton	Runs	139				

== Sources ==
The Encyclopedia of Minor League Baseball: Second Edition.
