= Bicentennial Park (Allentown) =

Baseball and softball stadium in Allentown, Pennsylvania

- Interactive map of Bicentennial Park
- Full name: Earl F. Hunsicker Bicentennial Park
- Former names: ECTB Stadium at Earl F. Hunsicker Bicentennial Park (2005-unknown, before 2024); Earl F. Hunsicker Bicentennial Park (1987-2005); Bicentennial Park (1976-1987); Fairview Field (1939-1976)
- Location: Lehigh and South Howard Streets, Allentown, Pennsylvania, U.S.
- Coordinates: 40.587506°N 75.475522°W
- Owner: City of Allentown
- Surface: Grass and Clay

Construction
- Opened: 1939
- Renovated: 1976, 2024-2025
- General contractors: Alvin Butz's Construction Company (original construction; 2024/5 renovations)

Tenants
- Allentown Dukes (1939); Allentown Fleetwings (1940, 1942-1943); Allentown Wings (1941); Allentown Cardinals (1944-1947); Allentown Ambassadors (1997-2003); Philadelphia Force (2006-2009); Allentown Railers (2012-2019); Muhlenberg Mules (2025-present)

Website
- https://muhlenbergsports.com/facilities/bicentennial-park-baseball/13

Bicentennial Park is a baseball and softball stadium in Allentown, Pennsylvania that is home to the Muhlenberg College baseball team. The park, originally named after the bicentennial year of 1976 during which it was renovated, was officially renamed Earl F. Hunsicker Bicentennial Park after Hunsicker's death in 1987.

The stadium and land around it are owned by the City of Allentown and currently leased to Muhlenberg College.

== History ==
=== 20th century ===
The ballpark opened in 1939 as Fairview Field, home to the Allentown Dukes, a Boston Braves Minor League farm team. The Dukes, a founding member of the Interstate League, won both the regular-season pennant and defeated the Sunbury Senators in the playoffs. The 1939 Dukes featured future Major League Baseball players Joe Antolick, George Hennessey, and Tony Parisse.

The following year, the Dukes were replaced by the Allentown Fleetwings, which were affiliated with the St. Louis Cardinals.

In 1941, the team as taken over by the Philadelphia Phillies and renamed again, as the Allentown Wings; they reverted to the Cardinals in 1944 and played their final season at Fairview in 1947. Allentown played for the Interstate League title three times in four years, in 1944, 1945 and 1947, but lost each time. The team moved to Breadon Field, a new ballpark just north of the city in Whitehall Township, on August 6, 1948, after playing on the road until then due to construction delays.

Fairview Field was renovated in the mid-1970s and reopened as Bicentennial Park in 1976 for use as a softball field. The renovation effort was led by Earl F. Hunsicker who raised an estimated $1,400,000 over an 11-year period, aided by Mayor Joseph S. Daddona and the Allentown Recreation Commission.

After the Eastern League's Allentown Red Sox played their final season in 1960, the city was without pro ball until the Allentown Ambassadors of the independent Northeast League arrived in 1997.

=== 21st century ===
==== Allentown Ambassadors ====
From 1997 until 2004, Bicentennial Park was home to the Allentown Ambassadors. Dwindling attendance, hurt by increasingly poor on-field performance, led owner Peter Karoly to fold the Allentown Ambassadors shortly before the 2004 season; the franchise wound up as a travel team for a year as the Northeast League Aces prior to becoming the Worcester Tornadoes in 2005. Over its six seasons, 21 Major League Baseball players played for or managed the Ambassadors, including Ed Ott, Luis Andujar, Kim Batiste, Scott Bullett, Brian Drahman, Angelo Encarnacion, Mike Figga, Jason McDonald, Darryl Motley, and Brad Pennington.

==== Philadelphia Force ====
From 2006 through 2009, Bicentennial Park returned to a softball configuration, hosting the Philadelphia Force of National Pro Fastpitch professional women's softball league.

==== Allentown Railers & LANta Land Ownership Controversy ====
In 2005, the stadium was renamed ECTB Stadium at Earl F. Hunsicker Bicentennial Park. ECTB is an acronym for the Elite Championship Tournament Baseball, a youth baseball organization. The City of Allentown leased the stadium to the ECTB, which in turn subletted the stadium to numerous community organizations which hosted events there throughout the year. At the time, the ballpark could seat 4,600.

In 2009, a controversy emerged over the land on which the stadium existed. LANta, a public transportation service in the Lehigh Valley that owned 0.2 acres of the property extending from the left field parking lot to the left field base line, announced that it planned to build a new garage using federal stimulus money and later expand the site and buy the remaining property the stadium sits on from the city of Allentown. The plan, which would have led to the stadium's demolition, was opposed by the family of Earl Hunsicker and owner Terry Schadler, who opposed the proposal in the Allentown City Council.

After a four-year lease renewal was awarded by Allentown City Council to new stadium owner Dylan Dando in 2016, the matter was resolved in 2017. The property was returned from LANta to the City of Allentown in exchange for existing adjacent land, which had been vacant and used for stadium parking. LANta intends to use the vacant land for expansion of their existing facility near the stadium, which allows for the stadium to remain open.

==== Muhlenberg Mules ====
In February 2024, it was announced that Muhlenberg College had reached an agreement with the City of Allentown to lease and renovate Bicentennial Park for their baseball games. The Mules had been playing at the Lehigh County Sports Fields complex in West Allentown since 1997.

The renovated stadium was expected to be ready for the start of the college's 2025 baseball season. Ultimately, it opened in October at a ceremony that honored the Muhlenberg 1980 championship team.

== See also ==
- History of baseball in Allentown, Pennsylvania
- List of city parks and recreation facilities of Allentown, Pennsylvania
- List of historic places in Allentown, Pennsylvania
- Sports in Allentown, Pennsylvania
