= Harrisburg Senators (1893–1952) =

- (1893–1895, 1900, 1904–1915, 1924–1935, 1940–1942, 1946–1952); Harrisburg, Pennsylvania

Minor league affiliations
- Previous classes: Class B (1895, 1907–1914, 1916–1917, 1924–1932, 1940–1952); Class A (1933–1935); Class AA (1915); Class D (1901)
- Previous leagues: Interstate League (1940–1942, 1946–1952); New York-Penn League (1924–1935); New York State League (1916–1917); International League (1915); Tri-State League (1904–1914); Atlantic League (1900); Pennsylvania State League (1893–1895)

Major league affiliations
- Previous teams: Philadelphia Athletics (1952); Cleveland Indians (1946–1951); Pittsburgh Pirates (1940–1942); Boston Braves (1932–1935)

Minor league titles
- League titles (7): 1912; 1914; 1927; 1928; 1931; 1941; 1946

Team data
- Previous names: Harrisburg Senators (1907–1915, 1924–1925, 1940–1952); Harrisburg Islanders (1916–1917); Harrisburg Ponies (1911); Harrisburg (1900); Harrisburg Senators (1894–1895); Harrisburg Hustlers (1893)
- Previous parks: Island Park

The Harrisburg Senators was originally a name given to several minor league baseball clubs between 1893 and 1952. The name is also currently used by the modern-day team in the Double-A Eastern League, since 1987.

== History ==
=== Early teams ===
The first Senators teams can be traced to the Pennsylvania State League, where the team played as the Harrisburg Hustlers, before taking on the Senators name the following year. In 1900, the city fielded a team in the Atlantic League for one season. In 1911, the team was called the Harrisburg Ponies. In 1912, Harrisburg won the first of three Tri-State League championships. In 1915, the Newark Indians of the International League team moved to Harrisburg. The club lasted one year before moving to the New York State League and playing as the Harrisburg Islanders before disbanding in 1917. This left the city without professional baseball for seven years.

=== First incarnation ===
In 1924, the first incarnation of the Senators joined the newly formed New York–Penn League which was eventually renamed the Eastern League. Initially, the Senators and most of the other New York–Penn League teams were not affiliated with a Major League Baseball team. In 1925, Joe Munson hit a .400 batting average, a record which stands to this day in Senators history, and 33 home runs, a Senators record that was not broken until 1999. In 1927, the Senators started a five-year campaign with three Eastern league championships, winning titles in 1927, 1928, and 1931. The year 1932 brought the Senators an affiliation with the Boston Braves. The original Harrisburg Senators' reign ended in 1936, when flood waters from the surrounding Susquehanna River ruined their home ballpark, Island Field. The flood effectively ended Eastern League participation for the next 51 years.

=== Second and third incarnations ===
Another Senators team, representing Harrisburg and affiliated with the Pittsburgh Pirates, formed four years later in the smaller Interstate League. Like the Senators before it, the team gained success quickly, winning the league title one year later with stars Billy Cox and Dennis Taylor. The success, however, was short lived, as the team moved to nearby York, Pennsylvania to become an incarnation of the York White Roses in 1943. Another team affiliated with the Cleveland Indians was created, but was not as successful. The Interstate League disbanded this Harrisburg team in 1952, and any form of professional baseball was not played in the city for the next 35 years. The 1952 team in June signed a contract for Eleanor Engle, the first woman to sign a contract to play affiliated baseball, though she would never actually take the field.

== Season-by-season ==
Year	Record	Finish	Manager	Playoffs
1893	49-52	5th	Felix Marks / Jack Huston	
1894	56-45	2nd	Jack Huston	Lost disputed title game ( vs. Pottsville Colts)
1895	19-16	--	Frank Seiss	Team disbanded on June 14
1904	58-51	3rd	Peter Agnew	
1905	76-51	4th	Billy Hamilton	
1906	52-74	5th	Billy Hamilton	
1907	79-47	2nd	George Heckert	no playoffs
1908	80-47	2nd	George Heckert	no playoffs
1909	49-65	6th	George Heckert	no playoffs
1910	52-59	6th	Al Selbach	no playoffs
1911	47-61	7th	Al Selbach	
1912	75-37	1st	George Cockill	League Champs; No playoffs
1913	59-52	2nd (t)	George Cockill	no playoffs
1914	78-32	1st	George Cockill	League Champs; No playoffs
1915	61-76	6th	Harry Smith	Newark Indians moved to Harrisburg July 2
1916	48-47	8th Lew Wachter / George Cockill / Walter Blair		
1924	70-60	4th	Steve Yerkes (19–16) / Mickey LaLonge (6–3) / Glenn Killinger (40–34) / Nig Clarke (5–7)	No playoffs
1925	61-69	6th	Rankin Johnson, Sr.	
1926	47-84	8th	Rankin Johnson, Sr. (35–49) / Lee Dempsey (0–1) / Joe Lightner (12–34)	No playoffs
1927	87-51	1st	Win Clark	League Champs; No playoffs
1928	82-54	1st	Glenn Killinger	League Champs; No playoffs
1929	75-62	3rd	Johnny Tillman	No playoffs
1930	70-69	4th	Johnny Tillman	No playoffs
1931	83-56	1st	Joe Cobb (6–8) / Eddie Onslow (77–48)	League Champs; No playoffs
1932	74-66	2nd	Eddie Onslow	No playoffs
1933	60-76	7th	Eddie Onslow	No playoffs
1934	60-75	8th	Leslie Mann	
1935	59-77	6th	Art Shires	
1940	60-62	5th	Les Bell	
1941	81-43	1st	Les Bell	League Champs (vs. Trenton Senators, 4 games to 3); Won in first round (vs. Reading Brooks, 3 games to 1)
1942	69-68	3rd	Danny Taylor	Lost in 1st round (vs. Hagerstown Owls, 3 games to 1)
1946	76-64	2nd	Les Bell	League Champs (vs. Wilmington Blue Rocks, 4 games to 1); Won in first round (vs. Allentown Cardinals, 4 games to 1)
1947	71-69	4th	Les Bell	Lost in 1st round (vs. Wilmington Blue Rocks, 4 games to 1)
1948	64-76	6th	Les Bell	
1949	74-64	3rd	Les Bell	Lost League Finals (vs. Trenton Giants 4 games to 3); Won in first round (vs. Allentown Cardinals, 4 games to 2)
1950	77-62	3rd	Les Bell	Lost in 1st round (vs. Wilmington Blue Rocks, 4 games to 3)
1951	55-84	6th	Les Bell / Harold Cox	
1952	46-94	8th	Buck Etchison / Woody Wheaton	
