= Joe Neale =

American baseball player (1866–1913)

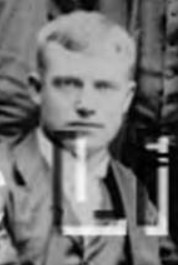
- Pitcher
- Born: May 7, 1866; Wadsworth, Ohio, U.S.
- Died: December 30, 1913 (aged 47); Akron, Ohio, U.S.
- Batted: Right Threw: Right

MLB debut
- June 21, 1886, for the Louisville Colonels

Last MLB appearance
- June 29, 1891, for the St. Louis Browns

MLB statistics
- Win–loss record: 12–12
- Earned run average: 4.59
- Strikeouts: 58
- Stats at Baseball Reference

Teams
- Louisville Colonels (1886–1887); St. Louis Browns (1890–1891)

Joseph Hunt Neale (May 7, 1866 – December 30, 1913) was an American professional baseball player. Neal played 10 seasons in pro-baseball, including 4 in Major League Baseball. He both pitched, and played the outfield positions. In his four-year career, Neale had a win-loss record of 12–12 with a 4.59 ERA, 3 saves, and 58 strikeouts in 31 games pitched, 25 games started.

== Professional career ==
=== Louisville Colonels ===
Before playing in Major League Baseball, Neale played for the 1886 Savannah Class-B minor league baseball team based in Savannah, Georgia. With Savannah, Neale went 3–6 with a 1.40 ERA in 9 games, all starts. With the Louisville Colonels in the majors, Neale went 0–1 with a 7.71 ERA in 1 game. The next season, Neale played the entire 1887 season with the Colonels. In 5 games, he went 1–4 with a 6.97 ERA, and 11 strikeouts.

=== St. Louis Browns ===
After playing for the Colonels, Neale spent the next two seasons in the minors with the Columbus Senators of the Tri-State League, and the Springfield Senators of the Central Interstate League. In 1890, Neale began the season with the major league St. Louis Browns. With the Browns that season, he went 5–3 with a 3.39 ERA, and 23 strikeouts in 10 games, 9 starts. Neale spent the rest of the season in the minor leagues with the Class-A Rochester Hop Bitters, and the Class-A Lebanon Cedars. The next season, Brown again played with the Browns. On the season, he went 6–4 with a 4.24 ERA, 3 saves, and 24 strikeouts in 15 games, 11 starts. Along with Kid Nichols, and John Clarkson, Neale lead the majors in saves.

=== Later career ===
In 1892, Neale played for the Class-B New Orleans Pelicans, and the Class-B Mobile Blackbirds, both of the Southern Association. The next season, Neale played for the Canton Deubers of the Ohio-Michigan League. Neale returned to the Southern Association in 1894 with the Class-B Memphis Giants. In final season in professional baseball, 1895, Neale played for the Class-B Montgomery Grays.
