= Shenandoah Huns =

- 1894–1895; Shenandoah, Pennsylvania

Minor league affiliations
- Previous classes: Class B (1895)
- Previous leagues: Pennsylvania State League

The Shenandoah Huns were a minor league baseball club, based in Shenandoah, Pennsylvania in 1894 and 1895. The team was formed when the Scranton Miners jumped from the Pennsylvania State League to the Eastern League on July 26, 1894. A week later the Huns were formed to replace Scranton in the league on August 2. The team continued to play in the Pennsylvania State League the following year, but disbanded during the season on May 20, 1895.

Prior to the Huns, Shenandoah fielded the Shenandoah Hungarian Rioters a minor league team that played from 1888 to 1889 in the Middle States League and the Central League.

== Season-by-season ==
Year	Record	Finish	Manager	Playoff
1888	28-22	2	J. M. Crinnan	
1889	1-14	NA	J. J. Monaghan	Entered the league July 17 and disbanded August 6
1894	55-55	NA	Martin Swift / George Goetz	Split record Scranton (45-28), Shenandoah(10-27)
1895	1-14	NA	Bill Brennan	Team disbanded on May 20
