= Breadon Field =

Minor league baseball field in Pennsylvania

Breadon Field – Max Hess Stadium
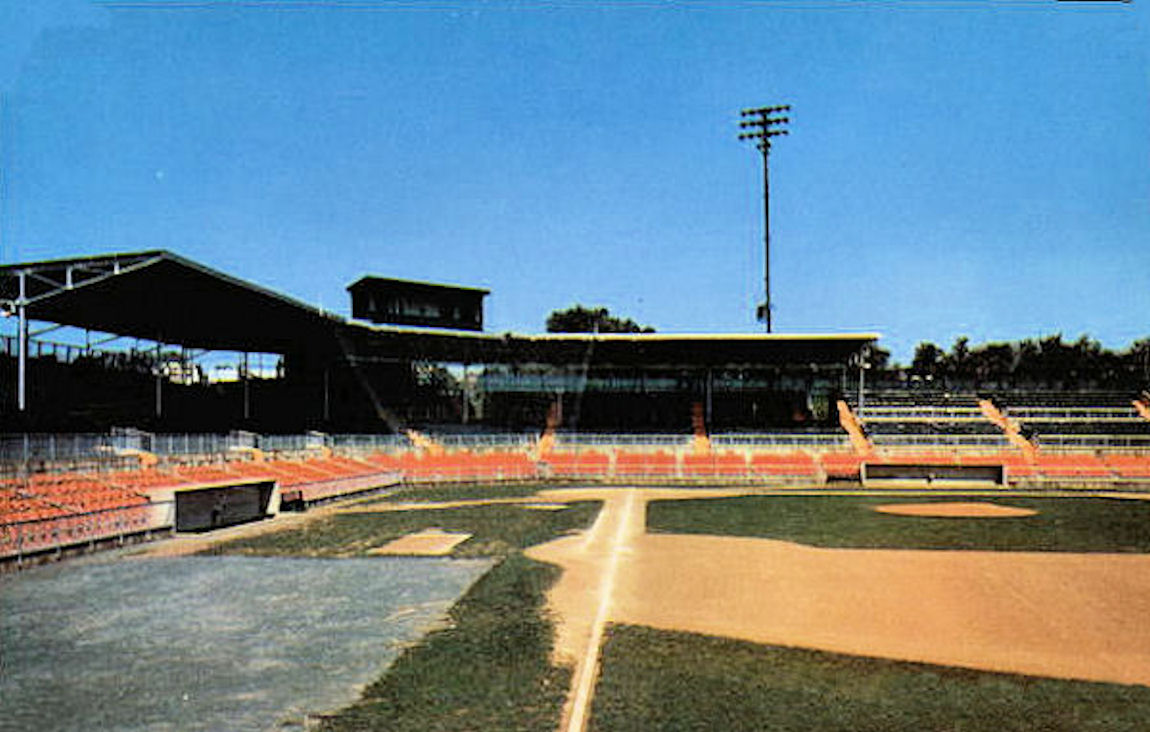
- Breadon Field in 1960
- Interactive map of Breadon Field – Max Hess Stadium
- Former names: Breadon Field (1948–1958); Max Hess Stadium (1958–1964)
- Location: Whitehall Township, Pennsylvania
- Coordinates: 40°37′47″N 075°29′00″W
- Surface: Grass

Construction
- Groundbreaking: 1948
- Opened: 1948
- Closed: 1960
- Demolished: 1964

Tenants
- Allentown Cardinals 1948–1952; 1954–1956; Allentown Chiefs 1957; Allentown Red Sox 1958–1960

Breadon Field was a minor league ballpark in Whitehall Township, Pennsylvania, located on the east side of MacArthur Road, about 0.5 miles (0.80 km) north of the U.S. Route 22 interchange outside of Allentown, Pennsylvania.

During its existence, the field was home to a number of Minor League Baseball teams: the Allentown Cardinals (affiliated with the St. Louis Cardinals), the Allentown Dukes (affiliated with the Atlanta Braves), and the Allentown Red Sox (affiliated with the Boston Red Sox). The stadium opened in 1948 and was demolished in 1964.

== History ==
=== Allentown Cardinals ===
Breadon Field was named for St. Louis Cardinals owner Sam Breadon, who built the ballfield in 1948 as a replacement for Fairview Field. Allentown, Pennsylvania had been a Cardinals "Class B" minor league club since the 1940 season when it bought the Allentown Dukes, a Boston Braves Minor League Baseball team that had opened Fairview Field the season before in 1939.

In 1946, Breadon announced the creation of a new baseball field in the vicinity of what is now Route 22 and MacArthur Road, approximately where the Lehigh Valley Mall is today. Breadon Field was the name given to the new, 5,000 seat, $425,000 ballpark that opened on August 6, 1948. In 1950, the Cardinals turned the task of running Breadon Filed over to Don Dix, a former minor league player in the Cardinals organization. Dix seemed to understand that the world of minor league baseball was changing. He created a number of promotions, most notably a Miss Allentown Cardinals beauty contest. However, a combination of bad weather, TV baseball and the collapse of the Interstate League, of which the Allentown Cardinals were a part, led the Cardinals organization to close Breadon Field after the 1952 season.

=== Allentown Red Sox ===
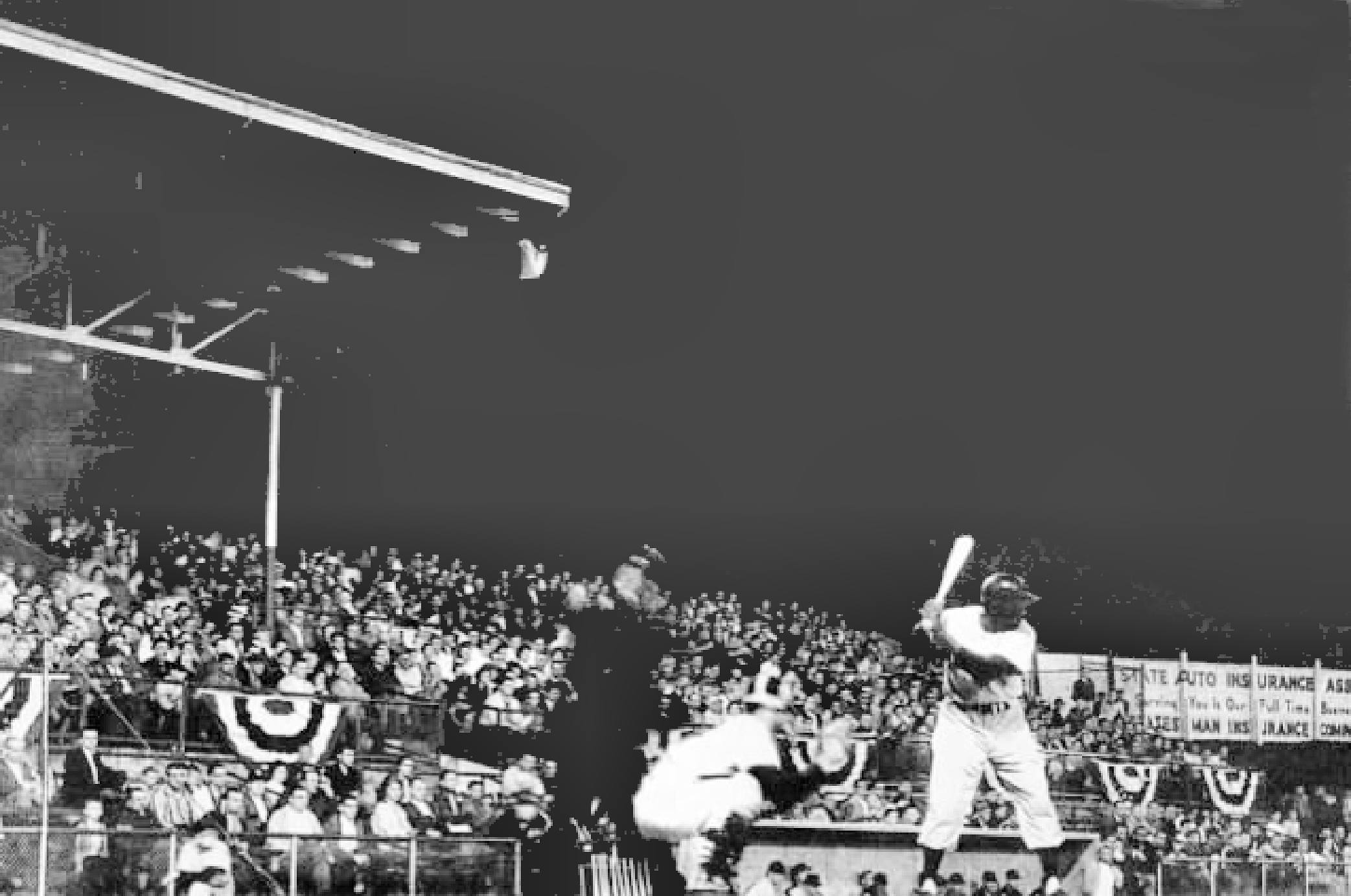
Allentown Red Sox' Opening Day at Breadon Field, 1960

In 1954, the club resumed operations in Allentown as part of the Eastern League under new Cardinals ownership. However, declining attendance led the sale of club and facilities in August 1957 to some local Allentown investors that included Lehigh County District attorney Paul A. McGinley and Brass Rail Restaurant owner Philip Sorrentino, for $180,000. MgGinley and Sorrentino brought a new club to Allentown, the "Class A" farm team of the Boston Red Sox, which became the Allentown Red Sox (A-Sox). Everything appeared to be going well until 1958 when stunned baseball fans learned that the club and Breadon Field had been purchased for $300,000 by Max Hess, Jr, owner of the Allentown Hess Brothers department store. Hess had no real interest in baseball, and to this day it is unclear why he bought the team. Hess renamed the stadium after himself (Max Hess Stadium). The club suffered both a dismal season on the field and also a lack of attendance in 1960. After the season ended, the Red Sox announced that the club would be moved to Johnstown, Pennsylvania for the 1961 season.

=== Demolition ===
After the Red Sox moved out several attempts to obtain another minor league team were made and failed. During the summer of 1961, local businessman Irwin Kreindel posted a $2,500 franchise fee with the Eastern League and obtained a working agreement with one of the National League's new expansion teams, the New York Mets. All he needed was an agreement to use Hess Stadium. However, Kreindel was unable to secure a lease, partly because Hess was negotiating a potential sale to a "big discount organization" looking at the site for a shopping center.

In 1963, the National Association opened talks with Hess about finding a way to put an Eastern League team back in Allentown. Talks went nowhere. Hess claimed no team wanted to play unless guaranteed at least a 50,000 a season attendance, and the stadium sat vacant. Finally, in 1964 Hess decided to demolish the ballpark. After being razed, the former baseball field eventually was sold by Hess in October 1965.

The land was undeveloped for about a decade, going through several owners and eventually being incorporated into a larger tract. It was developed into the Lehigh Valley Mall, which opened in 1976. The site of Breadon Field is located approximately where the entrance road from MacArthur Road enters the mall parking lot.

== Teams ==
The following teams played at Breadon Field:

- Allentown Cardinals, 1948–1952; 1954–1956
- Allentown Chiefs, 1957
- Allentown Red Sox 1958–1960 (as Max Hess Stadium)

== See also ==
- Sports in Allentown, Pennsylvania
- History of baseball in Allentown, Pennsylvania
