= Pottsville Colts =

- 1883–1907; (1883, 1894–1897, 1901, 1907–1909); Pottsville, Pennsylvania

Minor league affiliations
- Previous classes: N/A (1907–1909); Class D (1901); Class F (1897); Class B (1895–1896); N/A (1883, 1894)
- League: Atlantic League (1907–1909); Independent (1902); Pennsylvania State League (1901); Central Pennsylvania League (1897); Pennsylvania State League (1894–1896); Interstate Association (1883)

Minor league titles
- League titles: 1 (1894)

Team data
- Previous names: Pottsville (1901-1902, 1907–1909); Pottsville Greys (1897); Pottsville (1896); Pottsville Colts (1894–1895); Pottsville Anthracites (1883)
- Previous parks: Tumbling Run Park

The Pottsville Colts were a minor league baseball team, that played in Pottsville, Pennsylvania in the late 1890s and early 1900. The team was the second professional baseball club in Pottsville, after the short-lived Pottsville Anthracites that played in the Interstate Association in 1883. The Anthracites posted a 15-50 record, which garnered them 6th place in the league standings.

The Colts were then established in 1894 and played in the Pennsylvania State League. In their first season, the Colts posted a 62-44 record under manager Phenomenal Smith for first place in the standings. In postseason play, Pottsville defeated the Harrisburg Senators in a disputed title game, therefore winning the 1894 league title. The Colts returned to the Pennsylvania State League in 1895, and posted a 35-33 record. However, on July 27, 1895, the club relocated to Allentown, Pennsylvania, after the Allentown Goobers disbanded. The team then relocated to Allentown for Reading, Pennsylvania on August 10, 1895 to finish the season.

Pottsville fielded a new team in 1896, that was noted as just Pottsville in the standings to continue play in the league. The following season, Pottsville fielded a team for play in the Central Pennsylvania League, the Pottsville Greys. However, on June 27, 1897, Pottsville disbanded their team, after posting an 8-13 record. A new team representing Shamokin, Pennsylvania then entered the league on July 5, 1897 taking Pottsville's record, before disbanding shortly afterwards on September 6.

Baseball returned to Pottsville in 1901 as the city fielded another unnamed team, for play in the Pennsylvania State League. However it was short-lived, as the club folded at the end of the season. On May 26, 1902, several thousand fans saw the independent Pottsville club defeat the St. Clair team at night under electric lights. Pottsville later fielded another unnamed team in 1907 that played until 1909 in the Atlantic League.
