= Joe Albanese =

American baseball player (1933–2000)

- Pitcher
- Born: June 26, 1933; New York City, U.S.
- Died: June 17, 2000 (aged 66); New York City, U.S.
- Batted: Right Threw: Right

MLB debut
- July 18, 1958, for the Washington Senators

Last MLB appearance
- September 9, 1958, for the Washington Senators

MLB statistics
- Win–loss record: 0–0
- Earned run average: 4.50
- Strikeouts: 3
- Stats at Baseball Reference

Teams
- Washington Senators (1958)

Joseph Peter Albanese (June 26, 1933 – June 17, 2000) was an American professional baseball player whose career spanned eight seasons, including a part of one in Major League Baseball with the Washington Senators (1958). Albanese was a pitcher. Over his major league career, he was in involved in no decisions with a 4.50 earned run average (ERA) and three strikeouts in six games, all in relief. He also played in the minor leagues with the Class-B Roanoke Ro-Sox (1951–1952), the Class-B Greensboro Patriots (1953, 1955), the Class-A Albany Senators (1953, 1956–1957), the Class-B Raleigh Capitals (1958), the Class-A Allentown Red Sox (1958) and the Double-A Chattanooga Lookouts (1959). While in the minors, Albanese compiled a record of 45–62 within 213 games. Albanese batted and threw right-handed.

== Professional career ==
=== Boston Red Sox ===
Albanese attended Bellarmine College Preparatory in San Jose, California before being signed by the Boston Red Sox in 1951. He started his professional baseball career that season with the Class-B Roanoke Ro-Sox in the Red Sox organization. That season, Albanese went 3–7 with a 5.10 earned run average (ERA) in 21 games, 10 starts. He continued playing with the Ro-Sox in 1952. On the season, Albanese went 13–10 with a 3.40 ERA in 43 games, 21 stars. Albanese split the 1953 season between the Class-B Greensboro Patriots and the Class-A Albany Senators. With the Patriots, he went 1–3 with a 4.21 ERA in 11 games, five starts. After his promotion to the Senators, he went 0–2. Albanese did not play during the 1954 season for unknown reasons. In 1955, Albanese resumed his playing career and was assigned to the Class-B Greensboro Patriots. He went 10–10 that season with a 3.45 earned run average (ERA) in 38 games, 24 starts.

In January 1956, the Boston Red Sox added Albanese to the major league roster. While attending spring training with the Red Sox that season, he separated his shoulder after and filing to catch a fly ball. Albanese was expected to be out for a month. During the 1956 season, he was assigned to the Class-A Albany Senators where he went 5–11 with a 5.10 ERA in 37 games, 14 starts. In 1957, Albanese attended spring training with the Red Sox for the second time in his career. He was again assigned to Class-A Albany that season where he went 9–8 with a 3.77 ERA in 34 games, 27 starts. Albanese began the 1958 season in the Red Sox organization with the Class-B Raleigh Capitals where he went 4–7 with a 3.92 ERA in 16 games, 10 starts. He also played for the Class-A Allentown Red Sox that season, going 0–2 in four games.

=== Washington Senators ===
On July 11, 1958, the Boston Red Sox traded Albanese and pitcher Jack Spring to the Washington Senators in exchange for pitcher Bud Byerly and a player to be named later. The player who was sent to Boston ended up being Spring, meaning in essence he was traded for himself. Albanese made his Major League Baseball debut on July 18, 1958, against the Chicago White Sox, pitching one inning, giving-up no runs and striking out one. In the majors that season, Albanese was involved in no decisions with a 4.50 ERA and six strikeouts in six games, all in relief. During his final season in professional baseball, 1959, Albanese played for the Double-A Chattanooga Lookouts in the Senators organization. With the Lookouts, Albanese compiled a record of 0–2 in nine games.

== Personal ==
Albanese was born on June 26, 1933, in New York City. After his playing career was over, Albanese resided in Colonia, New Jersey. He died on June 17, 2000, in New York City and was buried at St. George Cemetery in Neptune City, New Jersey.
