= Allentown Cardinals =

- 1944–1956; (1944–1952; 1954–1956); Allentown, Pennsylvania

Minor league affiliations
- Previous classes: Class A (1954–1956); Class B (1944–1952)
- League: Eastern League; Interstate League

Major league affiliations
- Previous teams: St. Louis Cardinals

Minor league titles
- League titles: 1955, Eastern League

Team data
- Previous parks: Breadon Field; 40°37′47″N 075°29′00″W

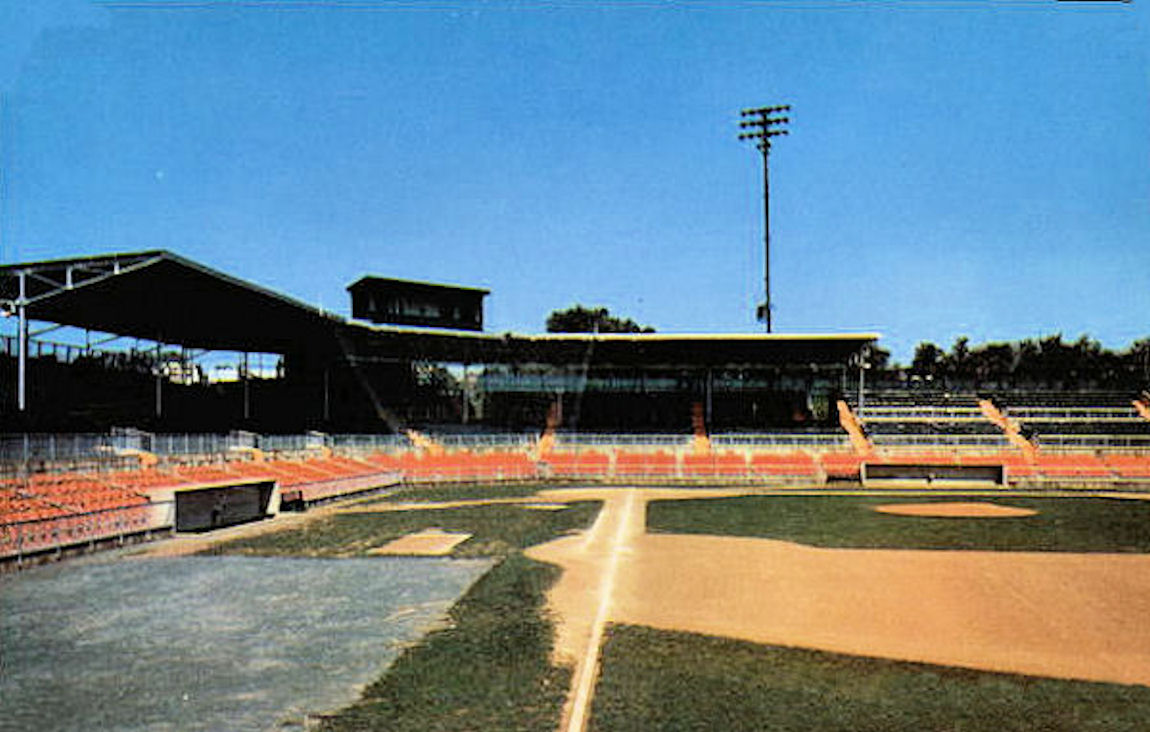
Breadon Field, looking south to north along the first base line, about 1960. Built in 1948, the field was the home of the Allentown Cardinals until their demise in 1956. The press box is above the roof over the stands.

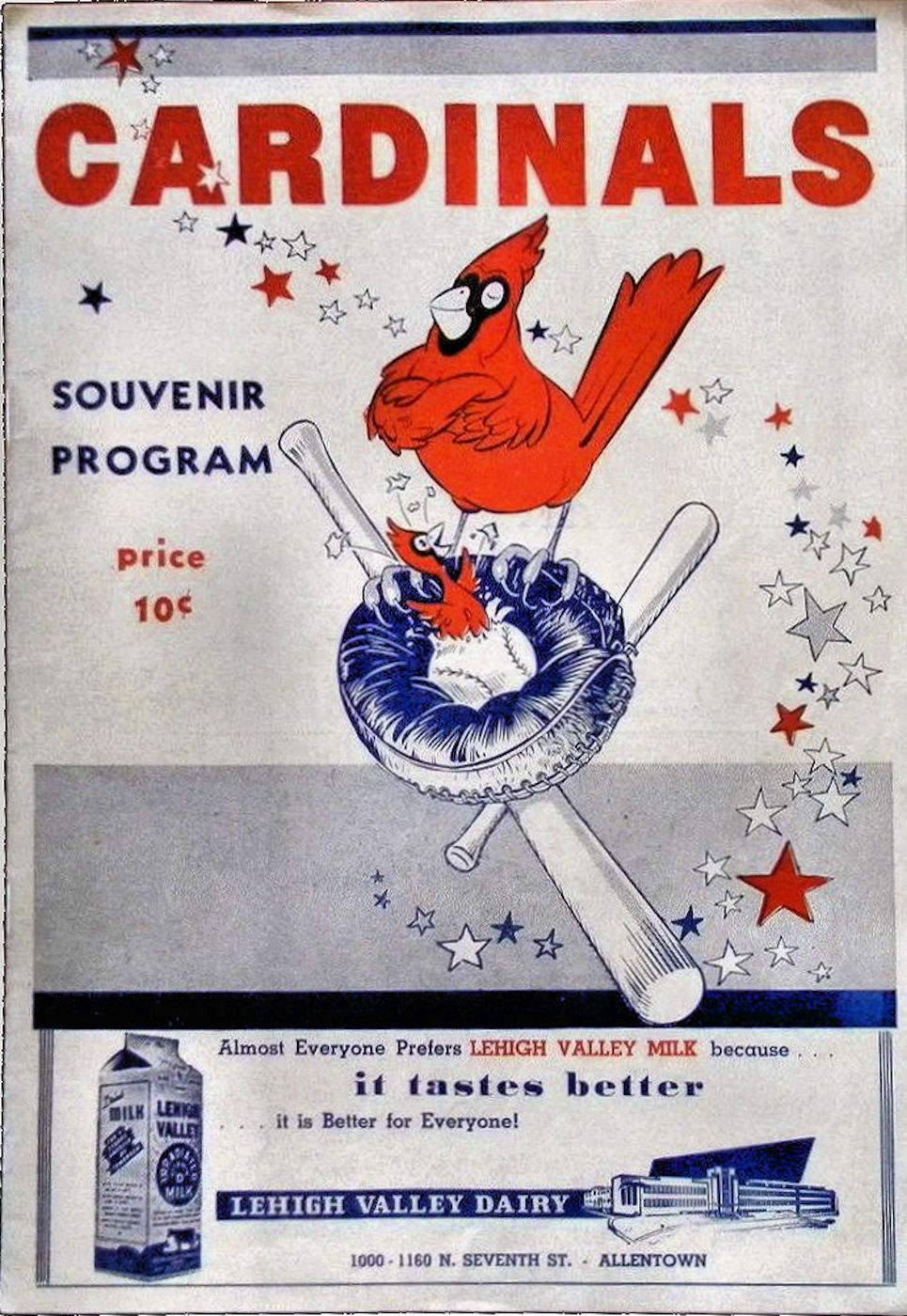
A 1950 Allentown Cardinals program

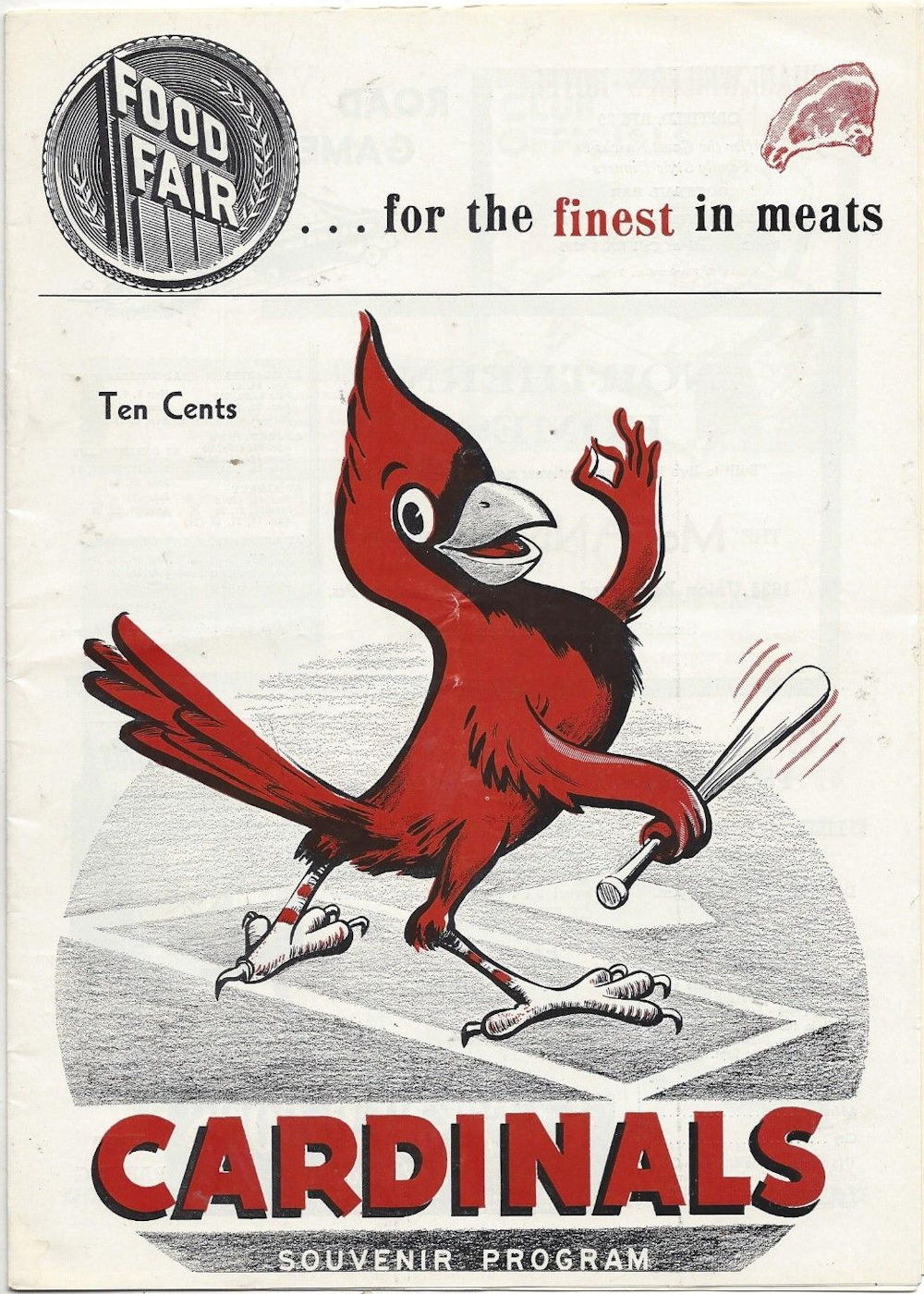
A 1956 Allentown Cardinals program

The Allentown Cardinals were a minor league baseball team. Affiliated with the St. Louis Cardinals, they played in the Class B Interstate League between 1944 and 1952; then in the Class A Eastern League from 1954 to 1956.

Allentown had joined the Interstate League in 1939, with the maiden team known as the Dukes. From 1940 through 1943, the club was nicknamed the Allentown Wings and began its affiliation with the Cardinals in 1942.

The Cardinals played at Fairview Field until 1948. In 1949, the team began play at the newly built Breadon Field, a steel and concrete stadium that seated 5,000 fans, which was located just north of the city in Whitehall Township. Poor attendance led to the teams demise after the 1956 season.

== Seasons ==
- Interstate League (Class B)

Year	Record	Finish
1944	77–62	1st
1945	68–71	4th
1946	69–70	4th
1947	71–67	3rd
1948	73–65	5th
1949	87–52	1st
1950	70–67	5th
1951	91–47	2nd
1952	82–57	2nd

Did not play in 1953 season

- Eastern League (Class A)

Year	Record	Finish
1954	66–74	6th
1955	78–60	2nd
1956	70–67	4th

== See also ==
- History of baseball in Allentown, Pennsylvania
- Sports in Allentown, Pennsylvania

== External references ==
- baseball-reference.com (All team and player statistics and teams)
