= History of professional baseball in Allentown, Pennsylvania =

Coca-Cola Park in Allentown, the home field of the Lehigh Valley IronPigs, the Triple A affiliate of the Philadelphia Phillies

The history of professional baseball in Allentown, Pennsylvania dates back to the late 19th century, starting with the formation of the Allentown Dukes in 1884 and continuing through the present with its hosting of the Allentown-based Lehigh Valley IronPigs, the Triple-A Minor League affiliate of the Philadelphia Phillies of Major League Baseball, which plays at Coca-Cola Park on the city's East Side.

== History ==
=== 19th century ===
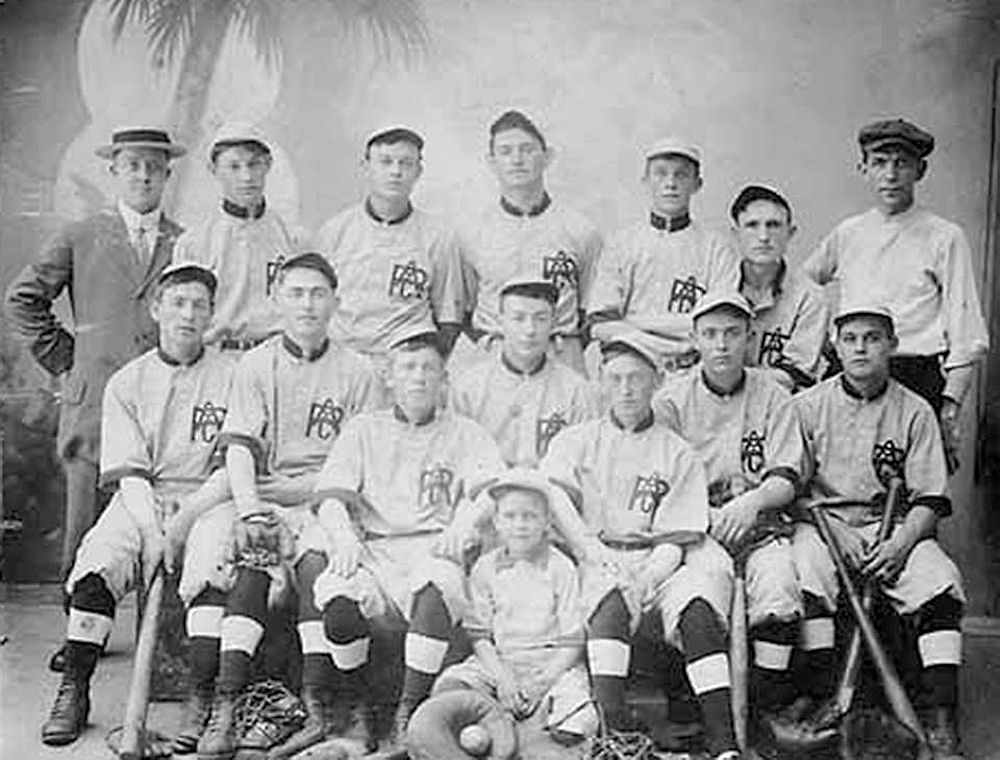
An 1898 photo of the Allentown Peanuts Baseball Club, a professional baseball team in Allentown in the Atlantic League

Professional baseball premiered in Allentown in 1884, when the Allentown Dukes completed one season in the original Eastern League. Four years later, the city fielded a Central League team, the Allentown Peanuts, which also folded after a season.

In the 1890s, a series of baseball clubs emerged in the city. The Allentown Colts played in the Pennsylvania State League from 1892–93. The next year, the team became Kelly's Killers, named for its player-manager, future Hall of Fame member King Kelly. Late in the season, Kelly moved the Eastern League's Binghamton Bingoes here as the Allentown Buffalos. Kelly, the era's most flamboyant figure, died of pneumonia that fall at age 35, and the Buffalos were dissolved.

In 1895, the Allentown Goobers returned to Pennsylvania State League play for one season. In 1898, yet another team was formed, re-using the name the Allentown Peanuts. The Peanuts played for three seasons in the Atlantic League, which succeeded the Pennsylvania State League in 1896. The league and the team were dissolved in 1900.

=== 20th century ===
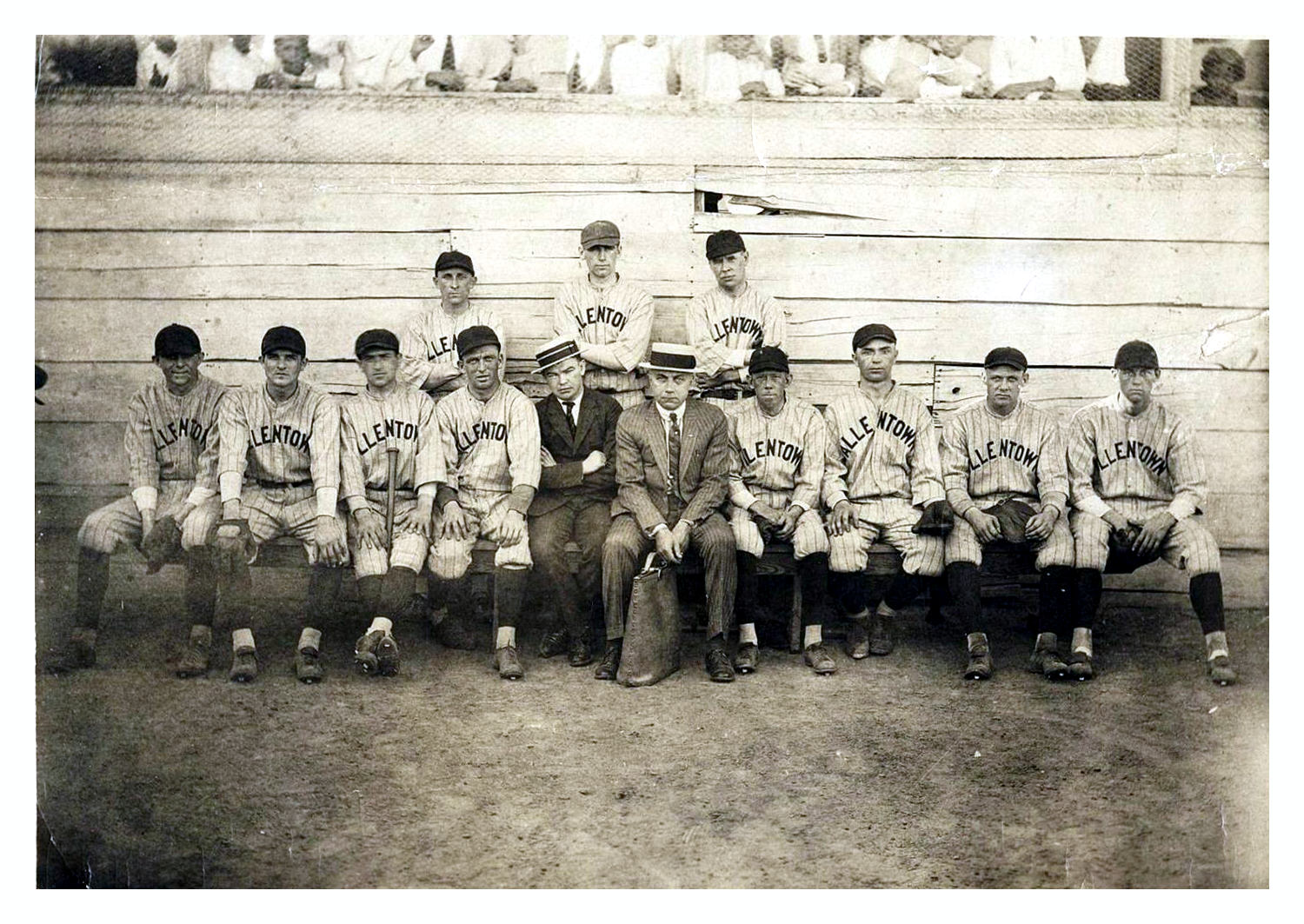
The Allentown Dukes baseball team in 1924

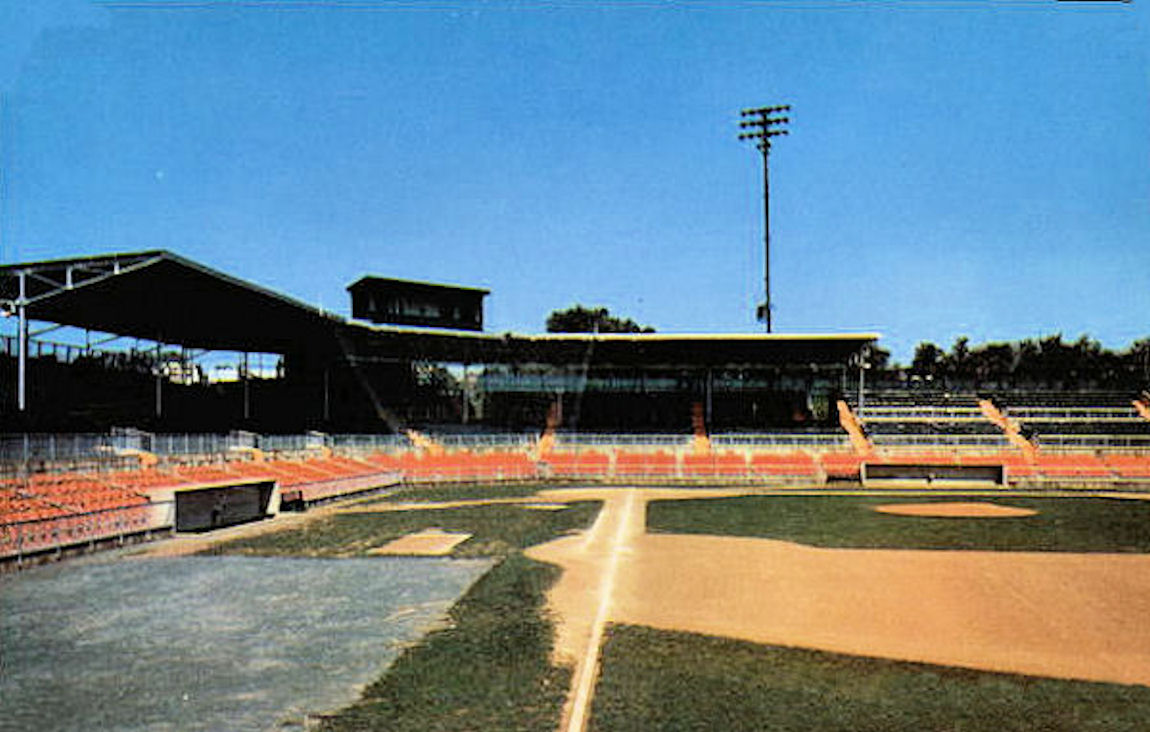
Breadon Field in neighboring Whitehall Township opened in 1948, closed in 1960, and was demolished in 1964

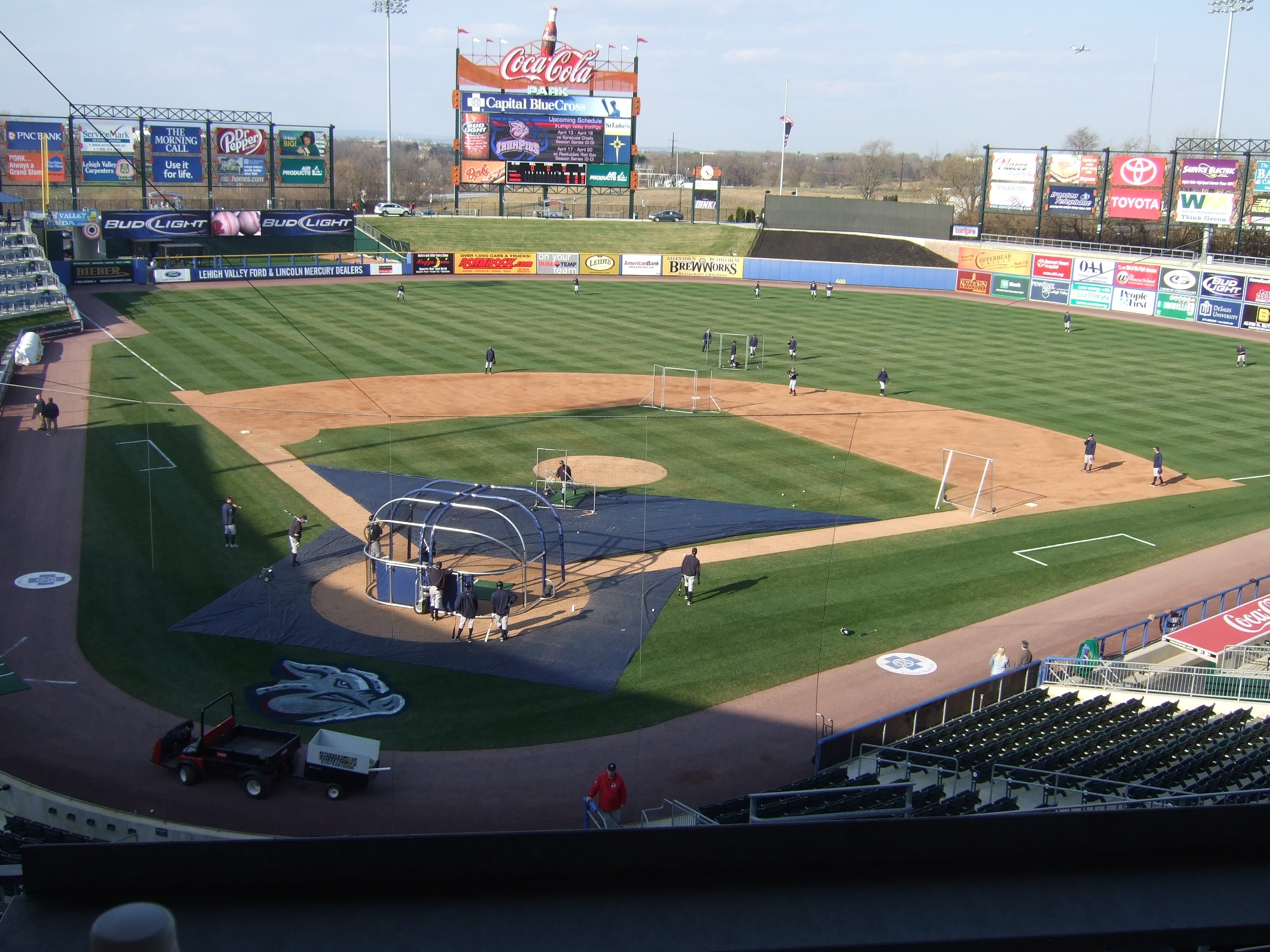
Coca-Cola Park in Allentown, the home of the Lehigh Valley IronPigs, the Triple A Minor League affiliate of the Philadelphia Phillies in April 2009

Over the next two decades, the city saw limited play. In 1908, Allentown hosted a team in the Pennsylvania-New Jersey League, and a Tri-State League club played here from 1912 to 1914. Then, in the 1920s, the name the Allentown Dukes was revived for a semi-professional team that played four seasons (1923–26) at Edgemont Field, a new ballfield at Second and Susquehanna Streets. On September 7, 1923 the Dukes played an exhibition game with the New York Yankees at Edgemont Field. The Dukes tied the score at 7–7 in the eighth inning. In the ninth, Babe Ruth struck out with the bases loaded, and the Dukes scored in the bottom of the inning to win 8–7. The semi-pro team led to the start of an Eastern League team under the same name in 1929. League champions the next year, the team was renamed the Allentown Buffaloes in 1931. At the end of the 1932 season, the league collapsed, and the Buffaloes folded.

In 1935, the city landed its first Major League farm team, when the Brooklyn Dodgers moved their Reading Brooks franchise here just six games into the season. The Allentown Brooks, like the Dukes and Buffaloes, played their home games at the Allentown Fairgrounds. The club, which was in the New York–Pennsylvania League (forerunner of today's Eastern League), finished out the 1936 season, but did not return the next year.

In 1939, the Boston Braves established an Interstate League club, again using the name the Allentown Dukes, and a new park was built on the city's South Side, Fairview Field (now Earl F. Hunsicker Bicentennial Park). The team won the league championship that year. The next year, 1940, the league was upgraded from Class C to B, and the team became the Allentown Fleetwings, a St. Louis Cardinals franchise. The Philadelphia Phillies took over in 1941, playing a season as the Allentown Wings, but the franchise reverted to St. Louis the next year. Renamed the Allentown Cardinals in 1944, the team played at Fairview Field until 1948, when St. Louis Cardinals owner Sam Breadon built a new park. Breadon Field, a steel and concrete stadium that seated 5,000 fans, was located just north of the city in Whitehall Township.

The demise of the Interstate League at the end of the 1952 season resulted in a one-year lull for the franchise. In 1954, the Allentown Cardinals returned as a member of the Class A Eastern League. The team won the league championship in 1955, but had its final season the next year, 1956. Midway through the 1957 season, the Syracuse Chiefs, an unaffiliated Eastern League team, moved to Allentown on July 13 to finish out the season. The Allentown Chiefs were replaced a year later by a Boston Red Sox franchise. The Allentown Red Sox played three seasons at the Whitehall ball park, which was bought by Hess's department store owner Max Hess, Jr., and renamed Max Hess Stadium. When the Red Sox left at the end of the 1960 season, the stadium closed and was demolished in 1964. Today, the site is the home of the Lehigh Valley Mall, which opened in 1976. The ballfield was located near the mall's entrance from MacArthur Road.

In 1997, professional baseball returned to the city with the startup of the Allentown Ambassadors, an independent team that played in the Northeast and Northern leagues. The club, which had its last full season in 2003, was based at Bicentennial Park in South Allentown.

The city unveiled Coca-Cola Park, a $48.4 million, 8,500-seat stadium, in 2008. The stadium was constructed on Allentown's east side to serve as the home field for the Philadelphia Phillies' AAA-level Minor League baseball team, the Lehigh Valley IronPigs. The IronPigs, a member of the International League, are the first Major League-affiliated club to play in the city since 1960.

== 21st century ==
During Summer 2008, the Lehigh Valley Heritage Museum introduced an exhibit, "Play Ball! Baseball in America and the Lehigh Valley," celebrating the history of baseball in Allentown and the surrounding region.
