= Jack Fee =

American baseball player (1867–1913)

- Pitcher
- Born: December 23, 1867; Carbondale, Pennsylvania, U.S.
- Died: March 3, 1913 (aged 45); Carbondale, Pennsylvania, U.S.
- Batted: Unknown Threw: Unknown

MLB debut
- September 14, 1889, for the Indianapolis Hoosiers

Last MLB appearance
- October 4, 1889, for the Indianapolis Hoosiers

MLB statistics
- Win–loss record: 2–2
- Strikeouts: 10
- Earned run average: 4.28
- Stats at Baseball Reference

Teams
- Indianapolis Hoosiers (1889)

John Fee (December 23, 1867 – March 3, 1913) was an American professional baseball player who played pitcher in the Major Leagues. He pitched in seven games, making three starts, for the 1889 Indianapolis Hoosiers of the National League. He continued to play in the minor leagues through 1895, primarily in the Pennsylvania State League.
