= Middle States League =

Defunct baseball league

- Sport: Baseball
- Founded: 1889
- Folded: 1889
- No. of teams: 13 (total)
- Country: United States
- Last champion: Harrisburg Ponies (1889)

The Middle States League was a minor league baseball league that operated in the Northeast United States in 1889. A total of 13 teams competed in the league, though several joined the original 8-team lineup after its April 28 start and several folded before its September 10 close. It was a racially integrated league that included two African American teams, the Cuban Giants and New York Gorhams. The Harrisburg Ponies won the league pennant.

== History ==
The Middle States League began play on April 28, 1889, and ended the season on September 10, 1889.

During the 1889 season there were many franchise changes. Norwalk entered the Middle States League on June 12 and disbanded July 3. Lancaster disbanded on June 15. Reading disbanded June 18. The Norristown team entered the Middle States League on June 20 and disbanded August 21. Philadelphia disbanded June 25. Lancaster disbanded on August 20. Shenandoah entered the Middle States League on July 17 and disbanded on August 6. Lebanon entered the league on August 9. Wilmington entered the Middle States League on August 22 and disbanded on August 30. York disbanded on September 3.

== Teams ==
- Cuban Giants
- Harrisburg Ponies
- Hazleton Pugilists
- Lancaster Dutch
- Lebanon Dutch Grays
- New York Gorhams
- Norristown
- Norwalk
- Philadelphia Giants
- Reading Actives
- Shenandoah Hungarian Rioters
- Trenton Cuban Giants
- Wilmington Peach Growers
- York Hayseeds

== Standings & statistics ==
1889 Middle States League
schedule
President: Charles P. Mason / William H. Voltz

Team standings	W	L	PCT	GB	Managers
Harrisburg Ponies	64	19	.771	-	James Farrington
Cuban Giants	55	17	.764	3½	Cos Govern
York Hayseeds	45	28	.616	14	Henry Myers / Joseph Devine / J. W. Hedrick / W. E. Whorl / Smyser
Norristown	18	22	.450	NA	Barney Stevenson / J. C. Smith
New York Gorhams	14	20	.412	NA	Benjamin Butler
Lancaster Dutch	10	15	.400	NA	Terrence Connell
Norwalk	12	19	.387	NA	James Donnelly
Wilmington Quicksteps	4	9	.308	NA	Thomas Kane
Lebanon Dutch Grays	6	16	.273	NA	Joseph Buck
Hazleton Pugilists	10	27	.270	NA	Harry Foote
Reading Actives	6	17	.261	NA	Edgar Cuthbert
Philadelphia Giants	2	24	.077	NA	Charles Mason
Shenandoah Hungarian Rioters	1	14	.071	NA	J. J. Monaghan

Norwalk entered the league June 12 and disbanded July 3; Lancaster disbanded June 15
Reading disbanded June 18; Norristown entered the league June 20 and disbanded August 21
Philadelphia disbanded June 25; franchise based at Lancaster, PA; disbanded August 20
Shenandoah entered the league July 17 and disbanded August 6
Lebanon entered the league August 9; Wilmington entered the league August 22 and disbanded August 30
York disbanded September 3
The Cuban Giants played in Trenton and Hoboken. The New York Gorhams played in Hoboken and Easton.
