= George Cockill =

American athlete and coach (1881–1937)

Biographical details
- Born: June 28, 1881; Pottsville, Pennsylvania, U.S.
- Died: November 2, 1937 (aged 56); Steelton, Pennsylvania, U.S.

Playing career

Football
- 1901–1904: Bucknell

Baseball
- 1901: Pottsville
- 1905: Coatesville/Shamokin
- 1906–1907: Albany Senators
- 1908: Williamsport Millionaires
- 1909–1910: Montreal Royals
- 1911: Reading Pretzels
- 1912–1914: Harrisburg Senators

Coaching career (HC unless noted)

Football
- 1905: Mansfield
- 1908: Mansfield
- 1914: Bucknell
- c. 1918: Steelton HS (PA)

Basketball
- 1914–1917: Bucknell
- c. 1918: Steelton HS (PA)

Baseball
- 1915–1918: Bucknell
- 1921–1922: Bucknell

Head coaching record
- Overall: 4–4–1 (college football, excluding Mansfield); 26–19 (college basketball); 41–30–1 (college baseball)

George W. Cockill (June 28, 1881 – November 2, 1937) was an American football, baseball, and basketball player and coach. He served as the head football coach at Bucknell University in Lewisburg, Pennsylvania in 1914. He also served as the school's head baseball coach (1915 to 1918, 1921 to 1922) and men's basketball coach (1914 to 1917).
