= Jim Kirby (baseball) =

American baseball player (1923–2009)

- Pinch hitter
- Born: May 5, 1923; Nashville, Tennessee, U.S.
- Died: July 17, 2009 (aged 86); Nashville, Tennessee, U.S.
- Batted: Right Threw: Right

MLB debut
- May 1, 1949, for the Chicago Cubs

Last MLB appearance
- May 13, 1949, for the Chicago Cubs

MLB statistics
- Batting average: .500
- At bats: 2
- Hits: 1
- Stats at Baseball Reference

Teams
- Chicago Cubs (1949)

James Herschel Kirby (May 5, 1923 – July 17, 2009) was an American pinch hitter in Major League Baseball who played for the Chicago Cubs during the 1949 season. Listed at 5 ft 11 in (1.80 m), 175 lb., Kirby batted and threw right-handed. He was born in Nashville, Tennessee.

Kirby began his career in the minor leagues in 1942, but missed the next three years due to military service. Returning to baseball action in 1946 he played until 1958, compiling 13 years of Post-World War II, including another nine and a half seasons after being drafted by the Cubs in the 1948 rule 5 draft.

In three major league games, Kirby had one hit in two at-bats for a .500 career batting average.

Kirby died in his home town of Nashville, Tennessee, at the age of 86.
