= Sports in Allentown, Pennsylvania =

Overview of sports activities in Allentown, Pennsylvania

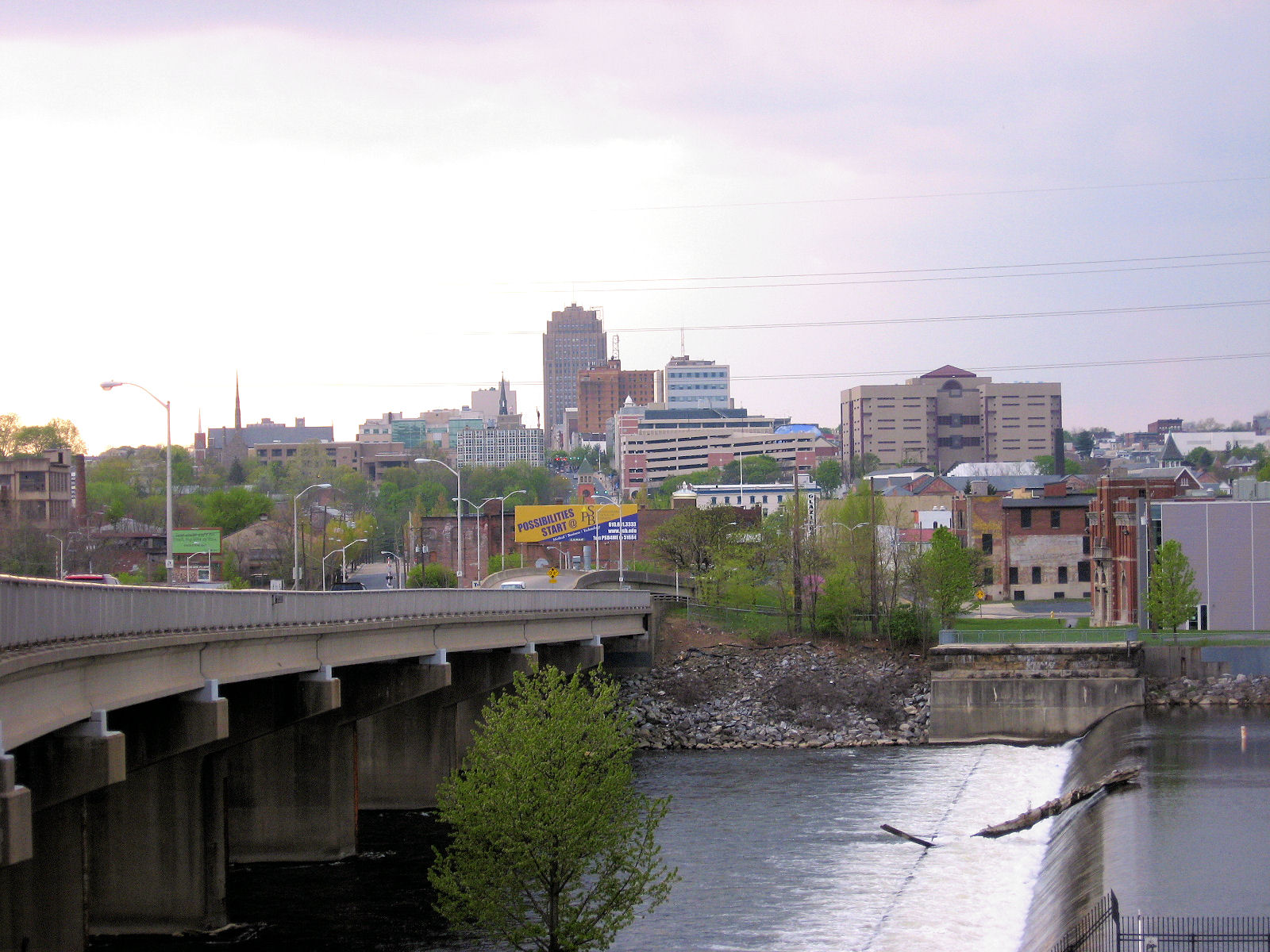
Allentown, the largest city in the Lehigh Valley, third-largest city in Pennsylvania, and county seat of Lehigh County in May 2010

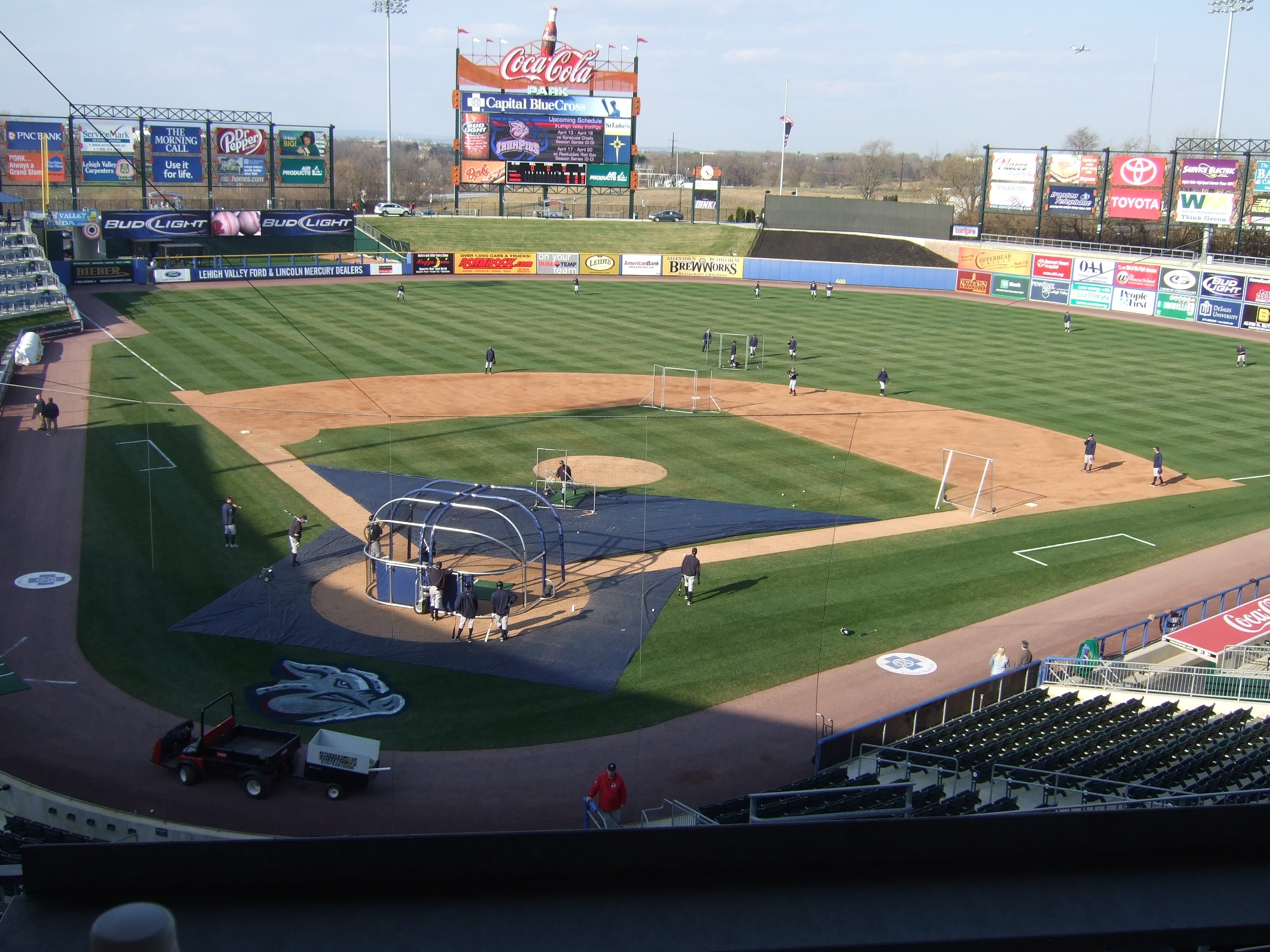
Coca-Cola Park in East Allentown, home of the Lehigh Valley IronPigs, the Triple A affiliate of the Philadelphia Phillies of Major League Baseball

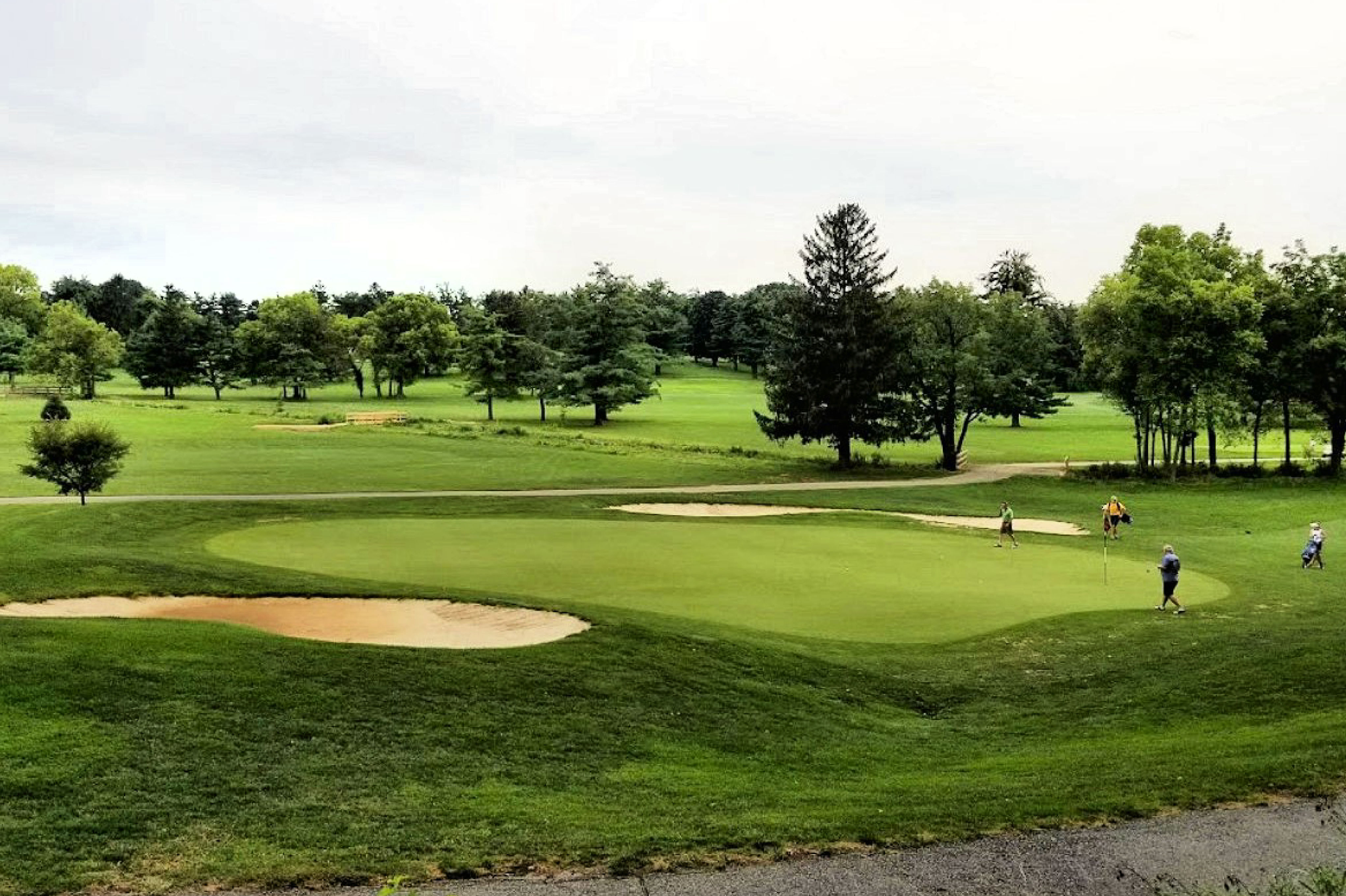
Allentown Municipal Golf Course on Tilghman Street

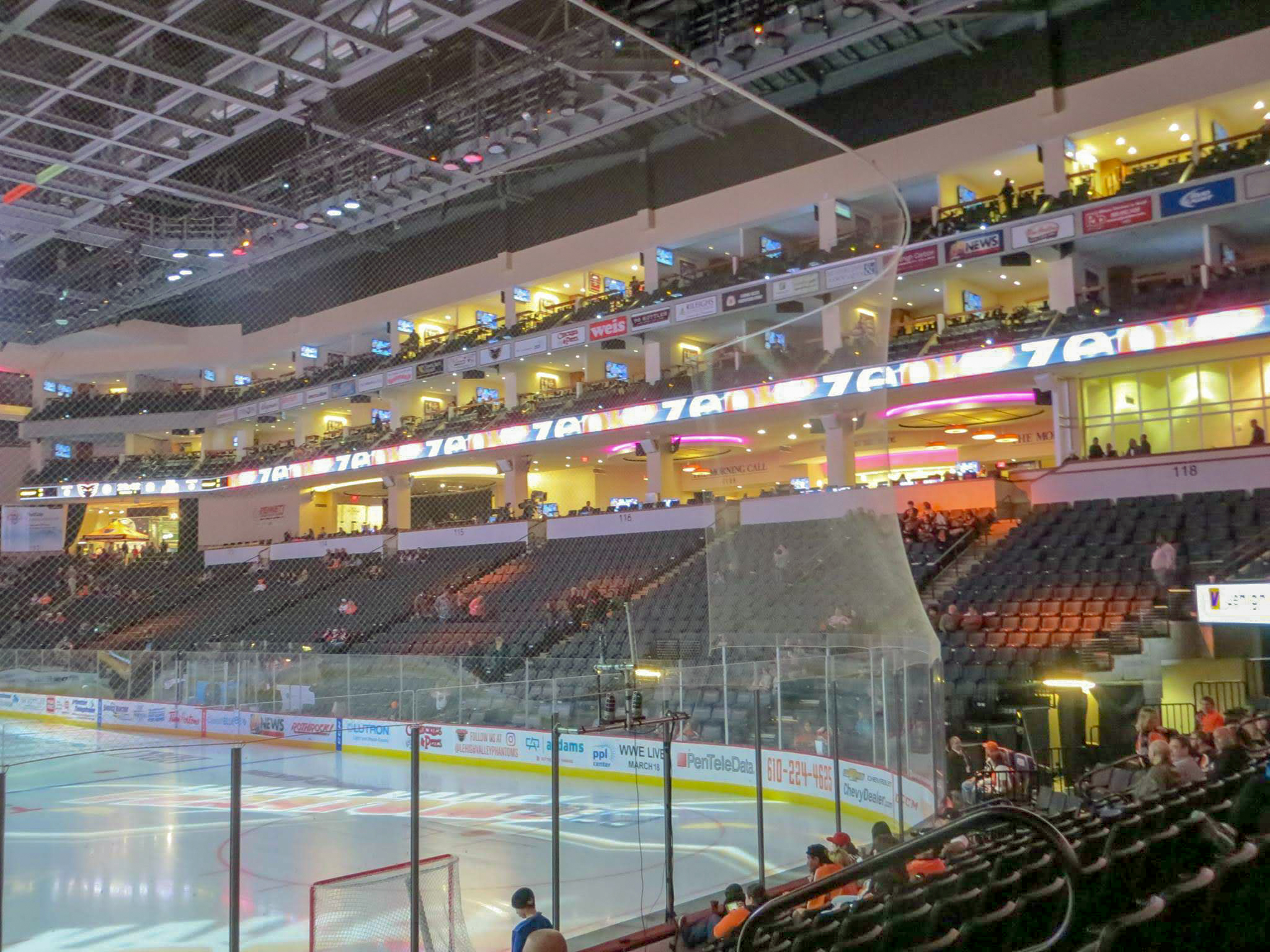
PPL Center in Allentown, the home arena of the Lehigh Valley Phantoms of the American Hockey League, the primary development team of the Philadelphia Flyers

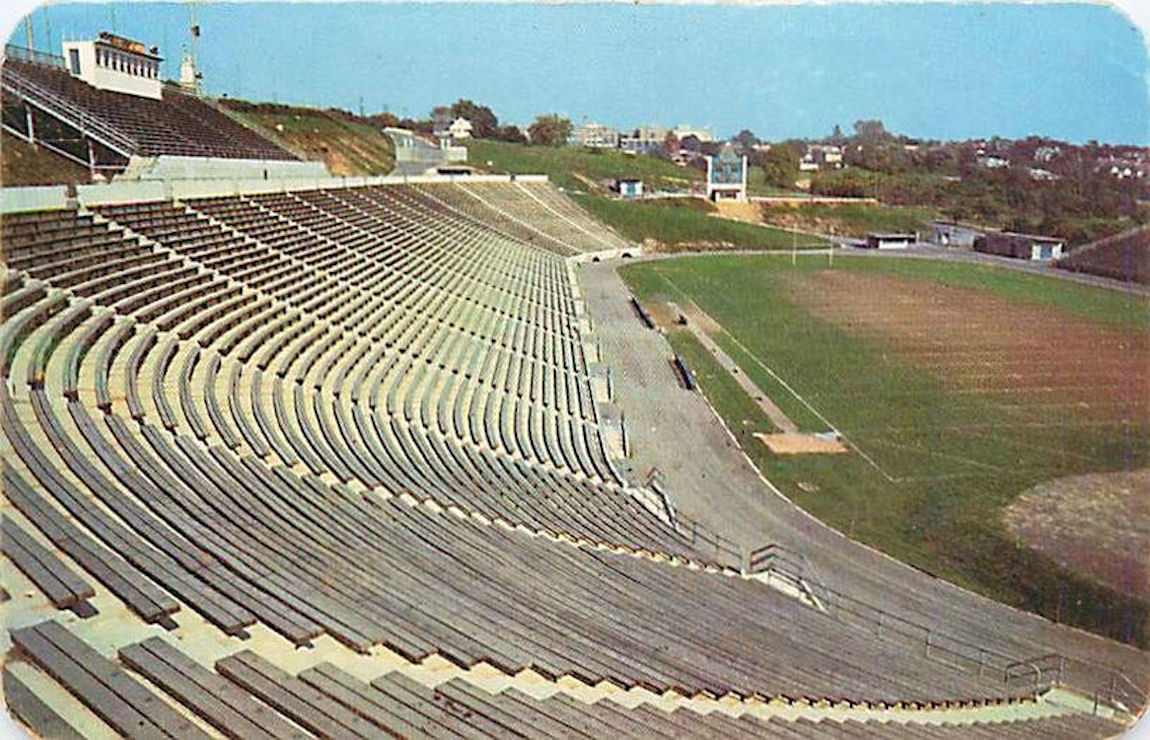
J. Birney Crum Stadium in Allentown, the largest high school stadium in the Mid-Atlantic U.S. and home field for three large Allentown-based Eastern Pennsylvania Conference high school football teams, Allen High School, Central Catholic, and Dieruff High School

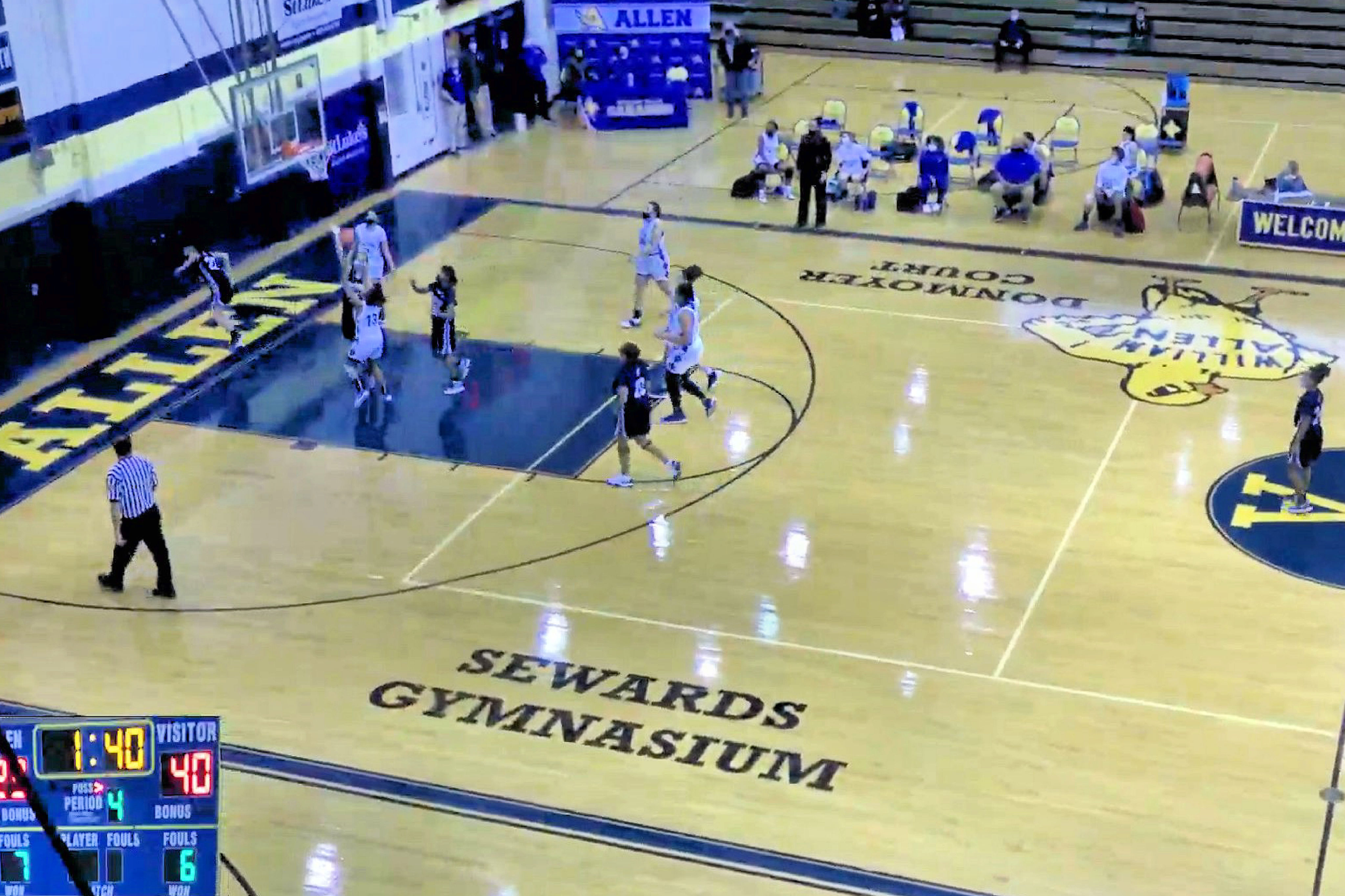
J. Milo Sewards Gymnasium at Allen High School in Allentown in February 2021

Sports in Allentown, Pennsylvania has a rich tradition at all levels, including professional sports, the Olympics, and high school levels. While most Allentown residents support professional sports teams in New York City or Philadelphia, Allentown itself also is home to two major professional sports teams, the Lehigh Valley IronPigs, the Triple A team of the Philadelphia Phillies of Major League Baseball, and the Lehigh Valley Phantoms of the American Hockey League, the primary development team of the Philadelphia Flyers.

The Lehigh Valley IronPigs play their home baseball games at Coca-Cola Park, a 10,178 capacity stadium in east Allentown. The Phantoms play their home ice hockey games at PPL Center, a 9,056 capacity indoor arena in Center City Allentown.

== Teams ==
| Club | League | Sport | Venue | Established | Championships |
|---|---|---|---|---|---|
| Lehigh Valley IronPigs | IL | Baseball | Coca-Cola Park | 2008 | 0 |
| Lehigh Valley Phantoms | AHL | Hockey | PPL Center | 2014 | 0 |

== Collegiate athletics ==
Both Cedar Crest College and Muhlenberg College, each in Allentown, have collegiate athletic programs in most sports. The Muhlenberg Mules football team plays their home games at Scotty Wood Stadium on the Muhlenberg campus in Allentown.

== Golf ==
The Lehigh Valley has many public and private golf courses. Allentown is home to Allentown Municipal Golf Course and Iron Lakes Country Club. Bethlehem is home to the Bethlehem Golf Club and Green Pond Country Club. There are also several other courses located outside of the cities. Saucon Valley Country Club in Upper Saucon Township hosted the 2009 U.S. Women's Open.

== Gymnastics ==
Parkettes National Gymnastics Training Center, which has been the training ground for numerous Olympians and U.S. national gymnastics champions, is based in Allentown. In 2003, CNN aired a documentary on Parkettes, Achieving the Perfect 10, which depicted it as a hugely demanding and competitive training program.

== High school athletics ==
Allentown's three high schools, Allentown Central Catholic High School, Louis E. Dieruff High School, and William Allen High School, all compete in the Eastern Pennsylvania Conference, one of the most elite high school athletic divisions in the nation. The conference comprises twelve of the largest high schools in the Lehigh Valley and offers 21 interscholastic boys and girls sports and has produced an abundant number of athletes who have gone on to compete in the National Football League, Major League Baseball, National Basketball Association, and Olympics. The conference's high school wrestling programs have been labeled "among the nation’s best in the sport for nearly three decades."

== Professional baseball ==
The Lehigh Valley IronPigs, the Triple A minor league affiliate of the Philadelphia Phillies, play their home games at Coca-Cola Park, a 10,178 capacity stadium in east Allentown.

In the 20th century, Minor League Baseball teams affiliated with the St. Louis Cardinals and Boston Braves (later the Boston Red Sox), played at Breadon Field in Whitehall Township near the current location of the Lehigh Valley Mall; the stadium opened in 1948 and was demolished in 1964.

== Professional basketball ==
Allentown hosted the Allentown Jets, an Eastern Professional Basketball League team, from 1958 to 1981. The Jets were one of the most dominant franchises in the league's history, winning eight playoff championships and twelve division titles. The team’s home games were played in Rockne Hall, the indoor arena of Allentown Central Catholic High School in Allentown.

== Professional ice hockey ==
On February 12, 2009, the owners of the Philadelphia Phantoms, the American Hockey League affiliate of the Philadelphia Flyers, announced their interest in moving the team to Allentown. At the time, it was decided that the team would play their home games at a proposed arena to be built on either the Lehigh River front or adjacent to Coca-Cola Park. The team, formerly named the Adirondack Phantoms, played their home games at the Glens Falls Civic Center in Glens Falls, New York.

In March 2011, it was announced that an 8,500-seat arena was to be built in Allentown, and the team was renamed the Lehigh Valley Phantoms. Additional plans for the area surrounding the arena included retail, restaurants, a convention center, and a hotel. The arena was constructed in Center City Allentown on West Hamilton Street. and opened September 10, 2014.

== Professional soccer ==
Allentown is the former home of the Pennsylvania Stoners, a professional soccer team. From 1979-1983, the Stoners were members of the American Soccer League. The team had a five-year league record of 76-49-25, and won the league championship in 1980. Due to increasing competition from other soccer leagues, and decreasing attendance, the team folded in 1983. The team was resurrected in 2007 as the Pennsylvania Stoners, and competes in the National Premier Soccer League (NPSL). The team played its home games at J. Birney Crum Stadium in Allentown until 2009, when the team changed venue to Zephyr Sports Complex in Whitehall. The Easton-based Northampton Laurels FC, of the Women's Premier Soccer League, plays their home games at Allentown's at J. Birney Crum Stadium.

== See also ==
- List of people from the Lehigh Valley
