= Coca-Cola Park =

Baseball Park in Pennsylvania, United States

- Coca-Cola Park in Allentown, Pennsylvania

- Location within Pennsylvania Location within the United States
- Location: 1050 IronPigs Way; Allentown, Pennsylvania; U.S.
- Coordinates: 40°37′34″N 75°27′9″W
- Owner: Lehigh County
- Operator: Lehigh County/L.V. Baseball LP.
- Capacity: 10,178 (8,278 seats)
- Surface: Kentucky bluegrass
- Field size: Left field: 323 ft (98 m); Left-center field: 374 ft (114 m); Deep left-center: 387 ft (118 m); Left of center field: 409 ft (125 m); Center field: 400 ft (120 m); Right of center field: 398 ft (121 m); Right-center field: 369 ft (112 m); Right field: 325 ft (99 m)
- Public transit: LANta bus: EBS Green Line, EBS Blue Line, 102 (at Union Boulevard)

Construction
- Groundbreaking: September 6, 2006
- Opened: March 30, 2008
- Cost: $50.25 million ($75.1 million in 2025 dollars)
- Architect: Populous
- Structural engineers: Brinjac Engineering, Inc.
- Services engineers: Brinjac Engineering, Inc.
- General contractor: Alvin H. Butz Inc.

Tenant
- Lehigh Valley IronPigs (IL/AAAE) 2008–present

Coca-Cola Park is a baseball park in Allentown, Pennsylvania. It is the home field for the Lehigh Valley IronPigs, the Triple-A level Minor League Baseball affiliate of the Philadelphia Phillies.

Coca-Cola Park accommodates 10,178 fans, including auxiliary areas (lawn, dugout suites, and Tiki Terrace), and cost $50.25 million to build. On March 7, 2007, naming rights to the stadium were awarded to the Coca-Cola Company Bottling Co. of the Lehigh Valley.

On February 3, 2026, the IronPigs and ABARTA Coca-Cola Beverages announced that Coca-Cola would be concluding its naming rights partnership at the end of the 2026 season. The stadium will be renamed to Jefferson Park in 2027 after the team reached a naming rights deal with Jefferson Health.

== Features ==
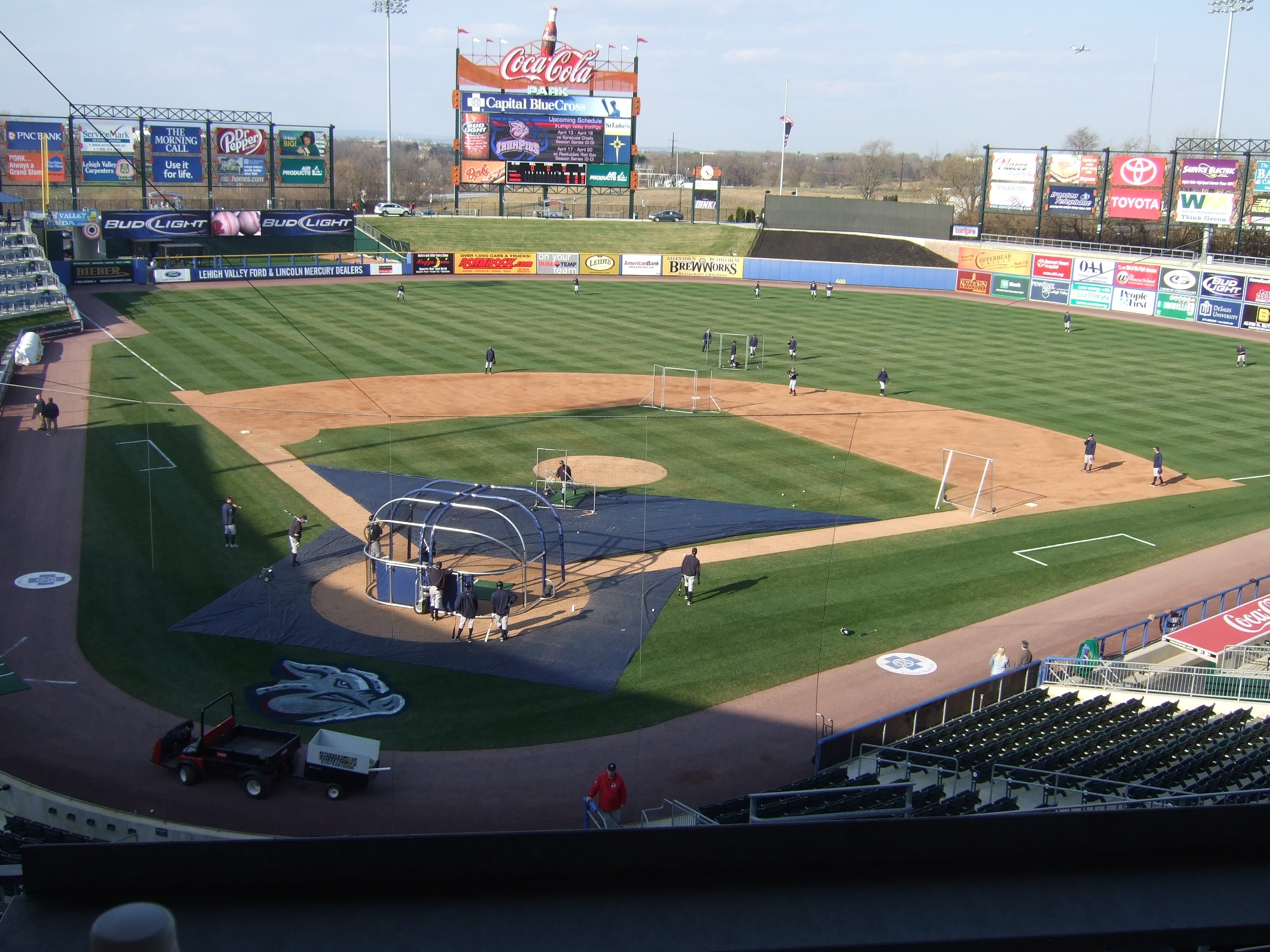
The infield of Coca-Cola Park in Allentown prior to a Lehigh Valley IronPigs game against the Pawtucket Red Sox in April 2009

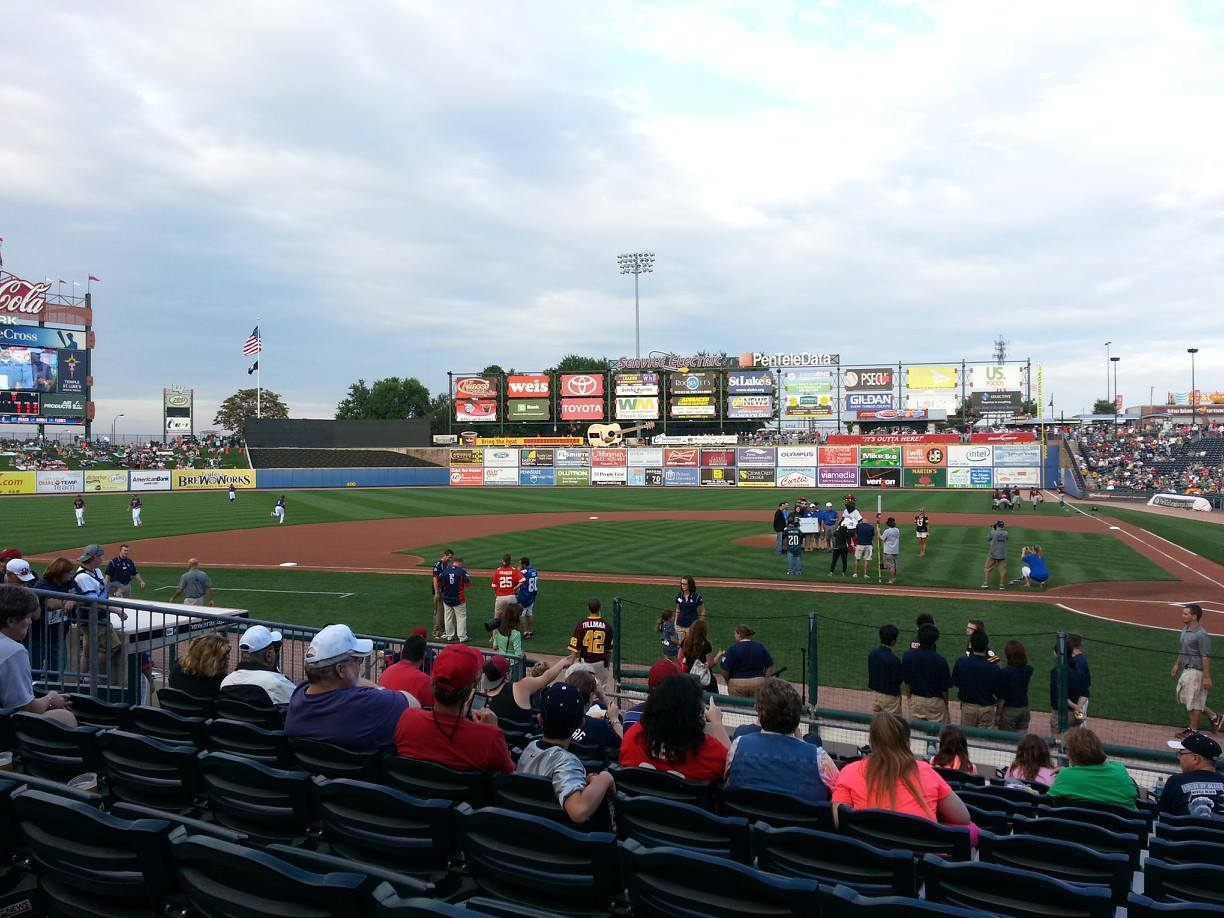
Coca-Cola Park infield as seen from field-level seats in 2015

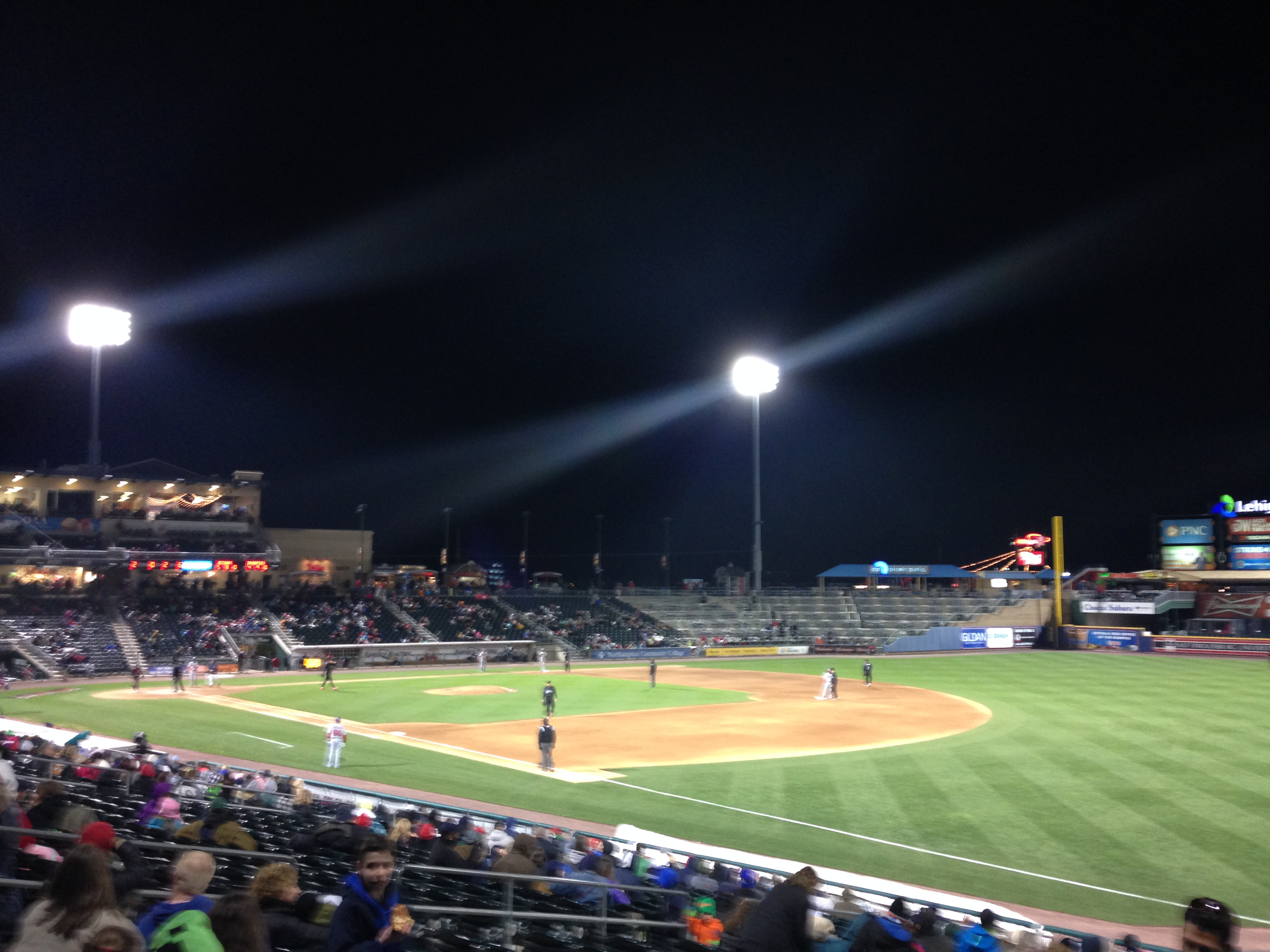
The Lehigh Valley IronPigs playing the Buffalo Bisons in a night game at Coca-Cola Park in April 2015

The stadium features the team "clubhouse" store, which sells team apparel. The Bacon Strip is an area immediately behind the right field wall that provides patrons the opportunity to stand and socialize during the game. The team's name is drawn from pig iron, used in the manufacturing of steel, a vital industry in the Lehigh Valley for most of the 20th century. References to the "pig" theme are used in the majority of concession stands and stores. The Picnic Patio is immediately adjacent to left field that features buffet style food and can be booked by groups. The club level of the stadium features an indoor concourse with access to the club level seats, the suites and the two party porches.

Dugout Suites are situated immediately behind home plate and slightly sunken in below field level. There is a kid zone with a playground area and a number of games, including speed pitch and slides.

In 2012, the park added the Tiki Terrace in Left Field over the bullpens which features large group seating, tables for four, and a bar area accessible to all ticketed fans.

The maximum capacity is 10,178, which includes 8,278 seats plus seating for 1,900 on the grass berm in center field. There is one main scoreboard which is located at the 400' mark on the field. The scoreboard consists of a 20' × 50' high definition video board, a 76' × 4' LED ribbon board, as well as a large Coca-Cola bottle, which also serves as a firework launcher when a run is scored.

In addition to its traditional stadium seating, Coca-Cola Park has a wide variety of seating options, including the grass berm, picnic benches, fold-down seats, and standing room. The initial estimate of the IronPigs stadium was $48.4 million. Its final price tag of $50.25 million, just four percent over the estimate, makes Coca-Cola Park one of the most expensive Minor League Baseball stadiums in the nation.

== History ==
=== 2006 groundbreaking ===
Groundbreaking ceremonies for the new ballpark were held on September 6, 2006, and construction was completed in February 2008. Coca-Cola Park was built on land formerly owned by LSI Corporation. The field dimensions and wall heights are similar to those at Citizens Bank Park in South Philadelphia differing in left field being six feet closer (323 feet, with the addition of the new "Pig Pen" seating section in 2015, to the foul pole compared to 329), center field being one foot shorter and the right field foul pole being five feet closer (325 feet in Allentown compared to 330 feet at Citizens Bank Park).

With its completion, Coca-Cola Park is Allentown's newest stadium, but it is not the city's largest. That distinction belongs to J. Birney Crum Stadium, which has a seating capacity in excess of 15,000, and is the second largest outdoor high school stadium in Pennsylvania.

The layout of Coca-Cola Park is slightly different from most ballparks with the main entrance located on the right field line rather than the common location behind home plate. Fans with club seating tickets, however, have a designated entrance behind home plate.

=== First concert: Bob Dylan, Willie Nelson, and John Mellencamp concert ===
The park hosted its first major non-sporting event on July 14, 2009, with a concert headlined by Bob Dylan, Willie Nelson, and John Mellencamp. More than 10,000 people attended the five-hour show, which was sold out. Following the event's success, Coca-Cola Park management indicated there was a good possibility other concerts would be held at the park in the future.

=== 2010 Triple-A All Star Game ===
The stadium hosted the 2010 Triple-A All-Star Game in which the International League All-Stars defeated the Pacific Coast League All-Stars, 2–1.

=== Usage by the Phillies ===
The stadium served as the Philadelphia Phillies' alternate training site in 2020 when the COVID-19 pandemic forced cancellation of the Minor League Baseball season and abbreviated the Major League Baseball season.

==== Rehab stints ====
In August 2022, as Phillies' star right fielder Bryce Harper was designated to the IronPigs in a final step in his rehabilitation stint as part of his comeback from a fractured thumb, IronPigs' fans in Allentown greeted Harper's appearance enthusiastically, and games featuring Harper against the Gwinnett Stripers at Coca-Cola Park quickly sold out to the stadium's 10,100 capacity. In his August 23 appearance with the IronPigs at Coca-Cola Park, Harper homered twice against the Stripers. In 2015 Chase Utley had a rehab stint in Lehigh Valley. During that stint there was a home game where he hit a home run to a sold-out crowd.

== Seating options ==
The seating options at Coca-Cola park include: The Oasis "Island" where each island includes circular half-table cocktail-style seating for the four fans in the party and wait service, club and field level seating, the "Bacon Strip" which is bar stool seating in left field, the "Pig Pen" which are seats just beyond the home run fence in right field, and general admission which allows fans access to the lawn, the Rum Bar area, the Tiki Terrace Bar and all standing room drink rail areas on the concourse.

== Location and transportation ==
The stadium is located on the east side of Allentown. The eastern segment of American Parkway provides access to the main entrance to the stadium and is accessible from U.S. Route 22. Union Boulevard and Airport Road serve as local arterials to the stadium. Paid parking is available on several on-site lots.
