= Eastern League Most Valuable Player Award =

- Sport: Baseball
- League: Eastern League
- Awarded for: Regular-season most valuable player of the Eastern League
- Country: United States; Canada
- Presented by: Eastern League

History
- First award: Jim Ray Hart (1962)
- Most recent: Franklin Arias (2026)

The Eastern League Most Valuable Player Award (MVP) is an annual award given to the best player in Minor League Baseball's Eastern League based on their regular-season performance as voted on by league managers. League broadcasters, Minor League Baseball executives, and members of the media have previously voted as well. Though the league was established in 1938, the award was not created until 1962. After the cancellation of the 2020 season, the league was known as the Double-A Northeast in 2021 before reverting to the Eastern League name in 2022.

Twenty-three outfielders have won the MVP Award, the most of any position. First basemen, with 18 winners, have won the most among infielders, followed by third basemen (9) and second basemen and shortstops (3). Five catchers and three pitchers have also won the award.

Twelve players who have won the MVP Award have also won the Eastern League Top MLB Prospect Award (formerly the Rookie of the Year Award) in the same season: Cliff Floyd (1993), Mark Grudzielanek (1994), Jay Payton (1995), Vladimir Guerrero (1996), Calvin Pickering (1998), Marlon Byrd (2001), Ryan Howard (2004), Jordan Brown (2007), Brandon Laird (2010), Darin Ruf (2012), Cavan Biggio (2018), and Franklin Arias. From 1964 to 1984, pitchers were eligible to win the MVP Award as no award was designated for pitchers. In 1985, the Eastern League established a Pitcher of the Year Award.

Nine players from the Reading Fightin Phils have been selected for the MVP Award, more than any other team in the league, followed by the Harrisburg Senators (6); the Chesapeake Baysox (4); the Akron RubberDucks, Binghamton Rumble Ponies, Glens Falls Tigers, New Hampshire Fisher Cats, and Portland Sea Dogs (3); the Elmira Pioneers, Erie SeaWolves, Pittsfield Cubs, Pittsfield Red Sox, Trenton Thunder, Trois-Rivières Aigles, and West Haven A's (2); and the Albany-Colonie Yankees, Altoona Curve, Berkshire Brewers, Buffalo Bisons, Charleston Indians, Holyoke Millers, New Britain Red Sox, New Haven Ravens, Pittsfield Rangers, Sherbrooke Pirates, Somerset Patriots, Springfield Giants, Thetford Mines Pirates, Waterbury Indians, Williamsport Mets, and York Pirates (1).

Nine players from the Philadelphia Phillies Major League Baseball (MLB) organization have won the award, more than any other, followed by the Baltimore Orioles and Pittsburgh Pirates organizations (6); the Boston Red Sox, Cleveland Guardians, New York Yankees, and Washington Nationals organizations (5); the New York Mets and Toronto Blue Jays organizations (4); the Detroit Tigers organization (3); the Chicago Cubs, Chicago White Sox, Cincinnati Reds, and Milwaukee Brewers organizations (2); and the Miami Marlins, Oakland Athletics, San Francisco Giants, and Texas Rangers organizations (1).

== Winners ==
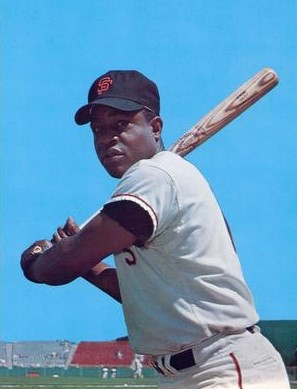
Jim Ray Hart won the first Eastern League Most Valuable Player Award in 1962.

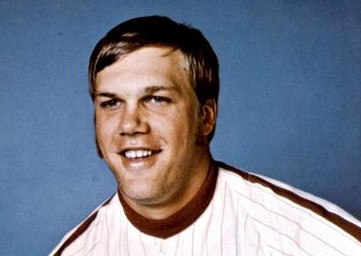
Greg Luzinski, winner of the 1970 MVP Award, became a four-time MLB All-Star (1975–1978).

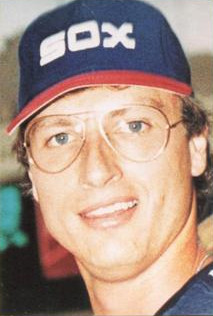
Ron Kittle, the 1981 MVP, won the 1983 American League Rookie of the Year Award.

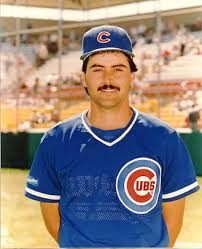
Rafael Palmeiro, winner of the 1986 MVP Award, became a four-time MLB All-Star (1988, 1991, 1998, 1999).

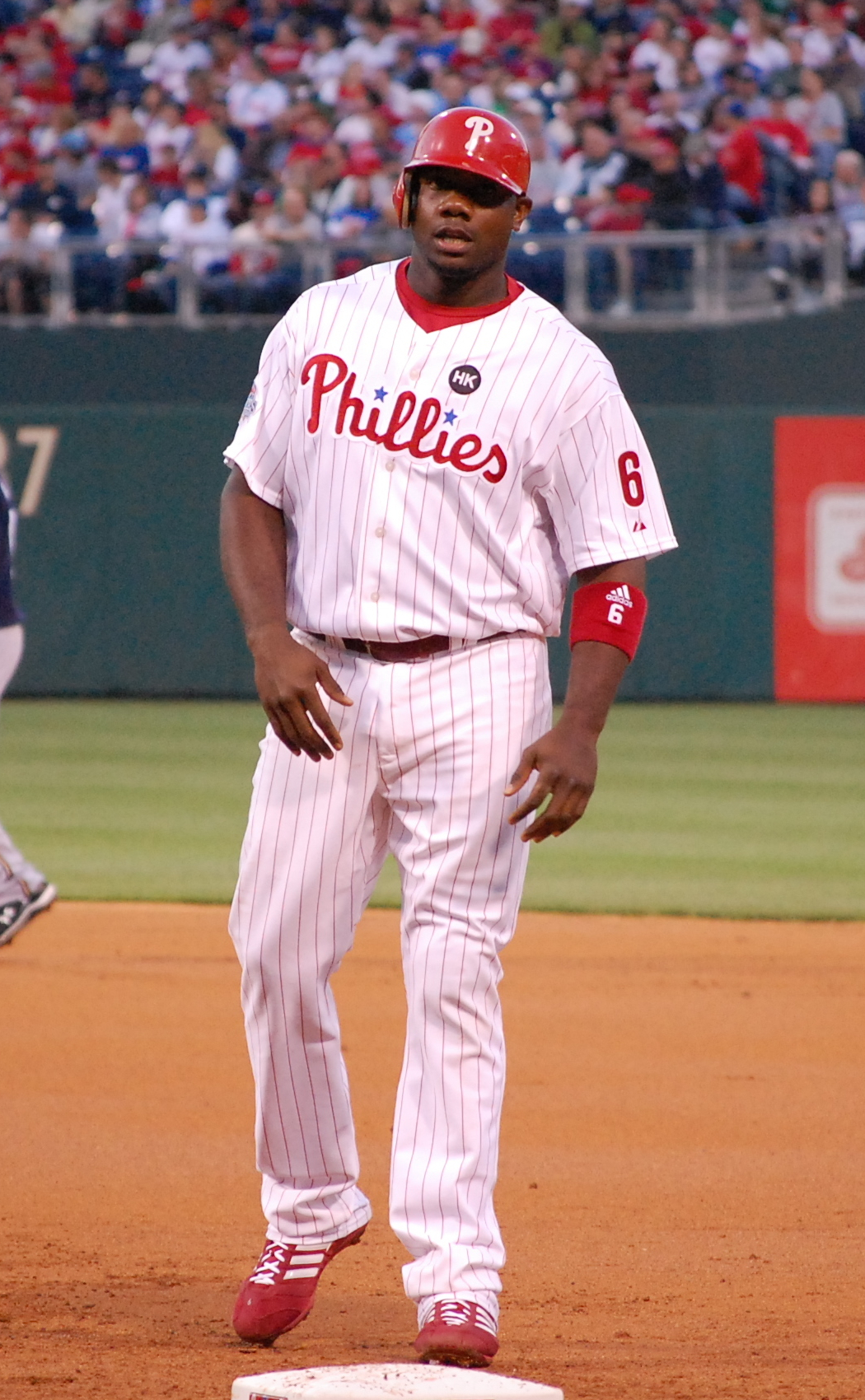
Ryan Howard, the 2004 MVP, won the 2005 National League Rookie of the Year Award and the 2006 NL MVP Award.

Key
Position	Indicates the player's primary position

Winners
Year	Winner	Team	Organization	Position	Ref(s).
1962	Jim Ray Hart	Springfield Giants	San Francisco Giants	Third baseman	
1963	Bob Chance	Charleston Indians	Cleveland Indians	First baseman	
1964	Frank Bertaina	Elmira Pioneers	Baltimore Orioles	Pitcher	
1965	Owen Johnson	Pittsfield Red Sox	Boston Red Sox	Catcher	
1966	Tom Fisher	Elmira Pioneers	Baltimore Orioles	Pitcher	
1967	Bernie Smith	Williamsport Mets	New York Mets	Outfielder	
1968	Carmen Fanzone	Pittsfield Red Sox	Boston Red Sox	Third baseman	
1969	Ángel Mangual	York Pirates	Pittsburgh Pirates	Outfielder	
1970	Greg Luzinski	Reading Phillies	Philadelphia Phillies	First baseman	
1971	Gene Locklear	Trois-Rivières Aigles	Cincinnati Reds	Outfielder	
1972	Fernando González	Sherbrooke Pirates	Pittsburgh Pirates	Third baseman	
1973	Tom Robson	Pittsfield Rangers	Texas Rangers	First baseman	
1974	Ken Macha	Thetford Mines Pirates	Pittsburgh Pirates	Catcher	
1975	Dave Bergman	West Haven Yankees	New York Yankees	First baseman	
1976	Danny Thomas	Berkshire Brewers	Milwaukee Brewers	Outfielder	
1977	Harry Spilman	Trois-Rivières Aigles	Cincinnati Reds	First baseman	
1978	Jeff Yurak	Holyoke Millers	Milwaukee Brewers	Outfielder	
1979	Rick Lancellotti	Buffalo Bisons	Pittsburgh Pirates	Outfielder	
1980	Mark Davis	Reading Phillies	Philadelphia Phillies	Pitcher	
1981	Ron Kittle	Glens Falls White Sox	Chicago White Sox	Outfielder	
1982	Jim Bennett	West Haven A's	Oakland Athletics	Outfielder	
1983	Jeff Stone	Reading Phillies	Philadelphia Phillies	Outfielder	
1984	Pat Adams	Glens Falls White Sox	Chicago White Sox	First baseman	
1985	Cory Snyder	Waterbury Indians	Cleveland Indians	Third baseman	
1986	Rafael Palmeiro	Pittsfield Cubs	Chicago Cubs	Outfielder	
1987	Mark Grace	Pittsfield Cubs	Chicago Cubs	First baseman	
1988	Rob Richie	Glens Falls Tigers	Detroit Tigers	Outfielder	
1989	Wes Chamberlain	Harrisburg Senators	Pittsburgh Pirates	Outfielder	
1990	Jeff Bagwell	New Britain Red Sox	Boston Red Sox	Third baseman	
1991	Matt Stairs	Harrisburg Senators	Montreal Expos	Second baseman	
1992	Russ Davis	Albany-Colonie Yankees	New York Yankees	Third baseman	
1993	Cliff Floyd	Harrisburg Senators	Montreal Expos	First baseman	
1994	Mark Grudzielanek	Harrisburg Senators	Montreal Expos	Shortstop	
1995	Jay Payton	Binghamton Mets	New York Mets	Outfielder	
1996	Vladimir Guerrero	Harrisburg Senators	Montreal Expos	Outfielder	
1997	Kevin Millar	Portland Sea Dogs	Florida Marlins	First baseman	
1998	Calvin Pickering	Bowie Baysox	Baltimore Orioles	First baseman	
1999	Andy Tracy	Harrisburg Senators	Montreal Expos	Third baseman	
2000	Adam Hyzdu	Altoona Curve	Pittsburgh Pirates	Outfielder	
2001	Marlon Byrd	Reading Phillies	Philadelphia Phillies	Outfielder	
2002	Víctor Martínez	Akron Aeros	Cleveland Indians	Catcher	
2003	Alex Ríos	New Haven Ravens	Toronto Blue Jays	Outfielder	
2004	Ryan Howard	Reading Phillies	Philadelphia Phillies	First baseman	
2005	Mike Jacobs	Binghamton Mets	New York Mets	First baseman	
2006	Adam Lind	New Hampshire Fisher Cats	Toronto Blue Jays	Outfielder	
2007	Jordan Brown	Akron Aeros	Cleveland Indians	First baseman	
2008	Lou Montañez	Bowie Baysox	Baltimore Orioles	Outfielder	
2009	Carlos Santana	Akron Aeros	Cleveland Indians	Catcher	
2010	Brandon Laird	Trenton Thunder	New York Yankees	Third baseman	
2011	Travis d'Arnaud	New Hampshire Fisher Cats	Toronto Blue Jays	Catcher	
2012	Darin Ruf	Reading Phillies	Philadelphia Phillies	First baseman	
2013	Allan Dykstra	Binghamton Mets	New York Mets	First baseman	
2014	Steven Moya	Erie SeaWolves	Detroit Tigers	Outfielder	
2015	Brock Stassi	Reading Fightin Phils	Philadelphia Phillies	First baseman	
2016	Dylan Cozens	Reading Fightin Phils	Philadelphia Phillies	Outfielder	
2017	Garabez Rosa	Bowie Baysox	Baltimore Orioles	Outfielder	
2018	Cavan Biggio	New Hampshire Fisher Cats	Toronto Blue Jays	Second baseman	
2019	Chris Gittens	Trenton Thunder	New York Yankees	First baseman	
2020	None selected (season cancelled due to COVID-19 pandemic)				
2021	Oswaldo Cabrera	Somerset Patriots	New York Yankees	Second baseman	
2022	Quincy Nieporte	Erie SeaWolves	Detroit Tigers	First baseman	
2023	Coby Mayo	Bowie Baysox	Baltimore Orioles	Third baseman	
2024	Kristian Campbell	Portland Sea Dogs	Boston Red Sox	Shortstop	
2025	Felix Reyes	Reading Fightin Phils	Philadelphia Phillies	Outfielder	
2026	Franklin Arias	Portland Sea Dogs	Boston Red Sox	Shortstop	

== Wins by team ==
Active Eastern League teams appear in bold.

Team	Award(s)	Year(s)
**Reading Fightin Phils** (Reading Phillies)	9	1970, 1980, 1983, 2001, 2004, 2012, 2015, 2016, 2025
**Harrisburg Senators**	6	1989, 1991, 1993, 1994, 1996, 1999
**Chesapeake Baysox** (Bowie Baysox)	4	1998, 2008, 2017, 2023
**Akron RubberDucks** (Akron Aeros)	3	2002, 2007, 2009
**Binghamton Rumble Ponies** (Binghamton Mets)	3	1995, 2005, 2013
Glens Falls Tigers (Glens Falls White Sox)	3	1981, 1984, 1988
**New Hampshire Fisher Cats**	3	2004, 2011, 2018
**Portland Sea Dogs**	3	1997, 2024, 2026
Elmira Pioneers	2	1964, 1966
**Erie SeaWolves**	2	2014, 2022
Pittsfield Cubs	2	1986, 1987
Pittsfield Red Sox	2	1965, 1968
Trenton Thunder	2	2010, 2019
Trois-Rivières Aigles	2	1971, 1977
West Haven A's (West Haven Yankees)	2	1975, 1982
Albany-Colonie Yankees	1	1992
**Altoona Curve**	1	2000
Berkshire Brewers	1	1976
Buffalo Bisons	1	1979
Charleston Indians	1	1963
Holyoke Millers	1	1978
New Britain Red Sox	1	1990
New Haven Ravens	1	2003
Pittsfield Rangers	1	1973
Sherbrooke Pirates	1	1972
**Somerset Patriots**	1	2021
Springfield Giants	1	1962
Thetford Mines Pirates	1	1974
Waterbury Indians	1	1985
Williamsport Mets	1	1967
York Pirates	1	1969

== Wins by organization ==
Active Eastern League–Major League Baseball affiliations appear in bold.

Organization	Award(s)	Year(s)
**Philadelphia Phillies**	9	1970, 1980, 1983, 2001, 2004, 2012, 2015, 2016, 2025
**Baltimore Orioles**	6	1964, 1966, 1998, 2008, 2017, 2023
**Pittsburgh Pirates**	6	1969, 1972, 1974, 1979, 1989, 2000
**Boston Red Sox**	5	1965, 1968, 1990, 2024, 2026
**Cleveland Guardians** (Cleveland Indians)	5	1963, 1985, 2002, 2007, 2009
**New York Yankees**	5	1975, 1992, 2010, 2019, 2021
**Washington Nationals** (Montreal Expos)	5	1991, 1993, 1994, 1996, 1999
**New York Mets**	4	1967, 1995, 2005, 2013
**Toronto Blue Jays**	4	2003, 2006, 2011, 2018
**Detroit Tigers**	3	1988, 2014, 2022
Chicago Cubs	2	1986, 1987
Chicago White Sox	2	1981, 1984
Cincinnati Reds	2	1971, 1977
Milwaukee Brewers	2	1976, 1978
Miami Marlins (Florida Marlins)	1	1997
Oakland Athletics	1	1982
**San Francisco Giants**	1	1962
Texas Rangers	1	1973
