= List of Eastern League champions =

The Eastern League of Minor League Baseball is A Double-A baseball league in the United States that began play in 1923. A league champion has determined at the end of each season. Champions have been determined by postseason playoffs, winning the regular season pennant, or being declared champion by the league office. For 2019, the league operated under a split season format in which the first place teams from each division in both the first and second halves of the season qualified for the playoffs. In the event that the same team won both halves, the team with the best win–loss record over the full season qualified. The first and second half winners then competed in a best-of-five series to determine division champions. The division winners then played each other in a best-of-five series to determine a league champion. As of 2022, the winners of each division from both the first and second halves of the season meet in a best-of-three division series, with the winners of the two division series meeting in a best-of-three championship series.

The 2020 season was cancelled due to the COVID-19 pandemic, and the league ceased operations before the 2021 season in conjunction with Major League Baseball's (MLB) reorganization of Minor League Baseball. In place of the Eastern League, MLB created the Double-A Northeast, a 12-team circuit divided into two divisions. Prior to the 2022 season, MLB renamed the Double-A Northeast as the Eastern League, and it carried on the history of the league prior to reorganization. In 2021, the Double-A Northeast held a best-of-five series between the top two teams in the league, regardless of division standings, to determine a league champion.

== League champions ==
Score and finalist information is only presented when postseason play occurred. The lack of this information indicates a declared league champion.

Year	Champion	Score	Finalist
1923	Williamsport Billies	—	—
1924	Williamsport Grays	—	—
1925^{[a]}	York White Roses	3–1	Williamsport Grays
1926	Scranton Miners	—	—
1927	Harrisburg Senators	—	—
1928	Harrisburg Senators	—	—
1929	Binghamton Triplets	—	—
1930	Wilkes-Barre Barons	—	—
1931	Harrisburg Senators	—	—
1932	Wilkes-Barre Barons	—	—
1933	Binghamton Triplets	—	—
1934	Williamsport Grays	4–2	Binghamton Triplets
1935	Binghamton Triplets	4–3	Scranton Miners
1936	Scranton Miners	4–0	Elmira Pioneers
1937	Elmira Colonels	4–1	Wilkes-Barre Barons
1938	Elmira Pioneers	3–2	Binghamton Triplets
1939	Scranton Red Sox	4–1	Albany Senators
1940	Binghamton Triplets	4–1	Hartford Bees
1941	Elmira Pioneers	4–3	Williamsport Grays
1942	Scranton Red Sox	4–1	Binghamton Triplets
1943	Elmira Pioneers	4–2	Scranton Red Sox
1944	Binghamton Triplets	4–2	Utica Blue Sox
1945	Albany Senators	4–3	Wilkes-Barre Barons
1946	Scranton Red Sox	4–1	Hartford Chiefs
1947	Utica Blue Sox	4–3	Albany Senators
1948	Scranton Red Sox	4–0	Albany Senators
1949	Binghamton Triplets	4–3	Wilkes-Barre Indians
1950	Wilkes-Barre Indians	4–1	Binghamton Triplets
1951	Scranton Red Sox	4–0	Elmira Pioneers
1952	Binghamton Triplets	4–1	Reading Indians
1953	Binghamton Triplets	4–2	Reading Indians
1954	Albany Senators	4–1	Reading Indians
1955	Allentown Cardinals	3–2	Schenectady Blue Jays
1956	Schenectady Blue Jays	3–0	Reading Indians
1957	Reading Indians	3–1	Albany Senators
1958	Binghamton Triplets	3–2	Lancaster Red Roses
1959	Springfield Giants	3–1	Williamsport Grays
1960^{[b]}	Springfield Giants; Williamsport Grays	—	—
1961	Springfield Giants	—	—
1962	Elmira Pioneers	3–1	Williamsport Grays
1963	Charleston Indians	—	—
1964	Elmira Pioneers	—	—
1965	Pittsfield Red Sox	—	—
1966	Elmira Pioneers	—	—
1967	Binghamton Triplets	3–1	Elmira Pioneers
1968	Reading Phillies	3–1	Pittsfield Red Sox
1969^{[c]}	York Pirates	—	—
1970	Waterbury Pirates	—	—
1971	Elmira Royals	3–1	Trois-Rivières Aigles
1972	West Haven Yankees	3–0	Trois-Rivières Aigles
1973	Reading Phillies	3–1	Pittsfield Rangers
1974	Thetford Mines Pirates	2–0	Pittsfield Rangers
1975	Bristol Red Sox	3–0	Reading Phillies
1976	West Haven Yankees	3–0	Trois-Rivières Aigles
1977	West Haven Yankees	3–0	Trois-Rivières Aigles
1978	Bristol Red Sox	2–0	Reading Phillies
1979	West Haven Yankees	—	—
1980	Holyoke Millers	2–1	Waterbury Reds
1981	Bristol Red Sox	3–2	Glens Falls White Sox
1982	West Haven A's	3–0	Lynn Sailors
1983	New Britain Red Sox	3–1	Lynn Sailors
1984	Vermont Reds	3–2	Waterbury Angels
1985	Vermont Reds	3–1	New Britain Red Sox
1986	Vermont Reds	3–2	Reading Phillies
1987	Harrisburg Senators	3–2	Vermont Reds
1988	Albany-Colonie Yankees	3–1	Vermont Mariners
1989	Albany-Colonie Yankees	3–1	Harrisburg Senators
1990	London Tigers	3–0	New Britain Red Sox
1991	Albany-Colonie Yankees	3–0	Harrisburg Senators
1992	Binghamton Mets	3–2	Canton-Akron Indians
1993	Harrisburg Senators	3–2	Canton-Akron Indians
1994	Binghamton Mets	3–1	Harrisburg Senators
1995	Reading Phillies	3–2	New Haven Ravens
1996	Harrisburg Senators	3–1	Portland Sea Dogs
1997	Harrisburg Senators	3–1	Portland Sea Dogs
1998	Harrisburg Senators	3–1	New Britain Rock Cats
1999	Harrisburg Senators	3–2	Norwich Navigators
2000	New Haven Ravens	3–1	Reading Phillies
2001^{[d]}	New Britain Rock Cats; Reading Phillies	—	—
2002	Norwich Navigators	3–2	Harrisburg Senators
2003	Akron Aeros	3–0	New Haven Ravens
2004	New Hampshire Fisher Cats	3–0	Altoona Curve
2005	Akron Aeros	3–1	Portland Sea Dogs
2006	Portland Sea Dogs	3–2	Akron Aeros
2007	Trenton Thunder	3–1	Akron Aeros
2008	Trenton Thunder	3–1	Akron Aeros
2009	Akron Aeros	3–1	Connecticut Defenders
2010	Altoona Curve	3–1	Trenton Thunder
2011	New Hampshire Fisher Cats	3–1	Richmond Flying Squirrels
2012	Akron Aeros	3–1	Trenton Thunder
2013	Trenton Thunder	3–0	Harrisburg Senators
2014	Binghamton Mets	3–0	Richmond Flying Squirrels
2015	Bowie Baysox	3–2	Reading Fightin Phils
2016	Akron RubberDucks	3–0	Trenton Thunder
2017	Altoona Curve	3–0	Trenton Thunder
2018	New Hampshire Fisher Cats	3–0	Akron RubberDucks
2019	Trenton Thunder	3–1	Bowie Baysox
2020	None (season cancelled due to COVID-19 pandemic)		
2021	Akron RubberDucks	3–0	Bowie Baysox
2022	Somerset Patriots	2–1	Erie SeaWolves
2023	Erie SeaWolves	2–0	Binghamton Rumble Ponies
2024	Erie SeaWolves	2–0	Somerset Patriots
2025	Binghamton Rumble Ponies	2–1	Erie SeaWolves
2026	Reading Fightin Phils	2–0	Erie SeaWolves

== Championship wins by team ==
Current EL teams appear in bold.

Wins	Team	Championship years
10	Binghamton Triplets	1929, 1933, 1935, 1940, 1944, 1949, 1952, 1953, 1958, 1967
8	Elmira Colonels/Pioneers/Royals	1937, 1938, 1941, 1943, 1962, 1964, 1966, 1971
7	Scranton Miners/Red Sox	1926, 1936, 1939, 1942, 1946, 1948, 1951
6	**Harrisburg Senators**	1987, 1993, 1996, 1997, 1998, 1999
6	**Akron RubberDucks** (Akron Aeros)	2003, 2005, 2009, 2012, 2016, 2021
5	**Reading Fightin Phils** (Reading Phillies)	1968, 1973, 1995, 2001, 2026
5	West Haven Yankees/A's	1972, 1976, 1977, 1979, 1982
4	**Binghamton Rumble Ponies** (Binghamton Mets)	1992, 1994, 2014, 2025
4	Trenton Thunder	2007, 2008, 2013, 2019
4	Williamsport Billies/Grays	1923, 1924, 1934, 1960
3	**New Hampshire Fisher Cats**	2004, 2011, 2018
3	Albany-Colonie Yankees	1988, 1989, 1991
3	Bristol Red Sox	1975, 1978, 1981
3	Harrisburg Senators (NYPL)	1927, 1928, 1931
3	Springfield Giants	1959, 1960, 1961
3	Vermont Reds	1984, 1985, 1986
3	Wilkes-Barre Barons/Indians	1930, 1932, 1950
2	Albany Senators	1945, 1954
2	**Altoona Curve**	2010, 2017
2	**Erie SeaWolves**	2023, 2024
2	New Britain Red Sox/Rock Cats	1983, 2001
2	York White Roses/Pirates	1925, 1969
1	Allentown Cardinals	1955
1	**Bowie Baysox**	2015
1	Charleston Indians	1963
1	Holyoke Millers	1980
1	London Tigers	1990
1	New Haven Ravens	2000
1	Norwich Navigators	2002
1	Pittsfield Red Sox	1965
1	**Portland Sea Dogs**	2006
1	Reading Indians	1957
1	Schenectady Blue Jays	1956
1	**Somerset Patriots**	2022
1	Thetford Mines Pirates	1974
1	Utica Blue Sox	1947
1	Waterbury Pirates	1970

== Notes ==
- ^{a} Williamsport and York finished the season with identical win–loss records. York defeated Williamsport, 3–1, in a championship series to determine the champion.
- ^{b} Springfield and Williamsport were declared co-champions after inclement weather forced the cancellation of the playoffs.
- ^{c} York was declared champion after inclement weather forced the cancellation of the playoffs.
- ^{d} New Britain and Reading were declared co-champions after the playoffs were cancelled in the wake the September 11 terrorist attacks.
