= Eastern League Pitcher of the Year Award =

- Sport: Baseball
- League: Eastern League
- Awarded for: Best regular-season pitcher in the Eastern League
- Country: United States
- Presented by: Eastern League

History
- First award: Brad Arnsberg (1985)
- Most recent: Anthony Eyanson (2026)

The Eastern League Pitcher of the Year Award is an annual award given to the best pitcher in Minor League Baseball's Eastern League. The award is based on their regular-season performance as voted on by league managers. Broadcasters, Minor League Baseball executives, and members of the media have previously voted as well. Though the league was established in 1938, the award was not created until 1985. After the cancellation of the 2020 season, the league was known as the Double-A Northeast in 2021 before reverting to the Eastern League name in 2022.

From 1962 to 1984, pitchers were eligible to win the Eastern League Most Valuable Player Award (MVP) as no award was designated for pitchers. Three pitchers won the MVP Award: Frank Bertaina (1964), Tom Fisher (1966), and Mark Davis (1980). One pitcher has also won the league's Top MLB Prospect Award (formerly the Rookie of the Year Award): Juan Acevedo (1994), who won both awards in the same season.

Six players from the Binghamton Rumble Ponies have been selected for the Pitcher of the Year Award, more than any other team in the league, followed by the Chesapeake Baysox and Portland Sea Dogs (5); the Akron RubberDucks and New Haven Ravens (3); the Albany-Colonie Yankees, Erie SeaWolves, Harrisburg Senators, New Hampshire Fisher Cats, and Trenton Thunder (2); and the Altoona Curve, Glens Falls Tigers, Hagerstown Suns, Hartford Yard Goats, Nashua Pirates, New Britain Rock Cats, Reading Fightin Phils, Richmond Flying Squirrels, Somerset Patriots, Vermont Reds, and Williamsport Bills (1).

Six players from the Baltimore Orioles and New York Mets Major League Baseball (MLB) organizations have won the award, more than any other, followed by the Boston Red Sox organization (5); the New York Yankees organization (4); the Cleveland Guardians, Colorado Rockies, and Detroit Tigers organizations (3); the Pittsburgh Pirates, Seattle Mariners, Toronto Blue Jays, and Washington Nationals organizations (2); and the Cincinnati Reds, Miami Marlins, Minnesota Twins, Philadelphia Phillies, and San Francisco Giants organizations (1).

== Winners ==
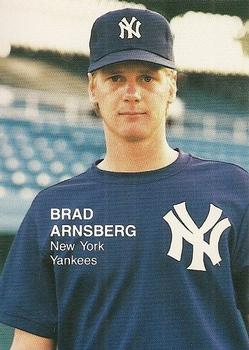
Brad Arnsberg won the first Pitcher of the Year Award in 1985.

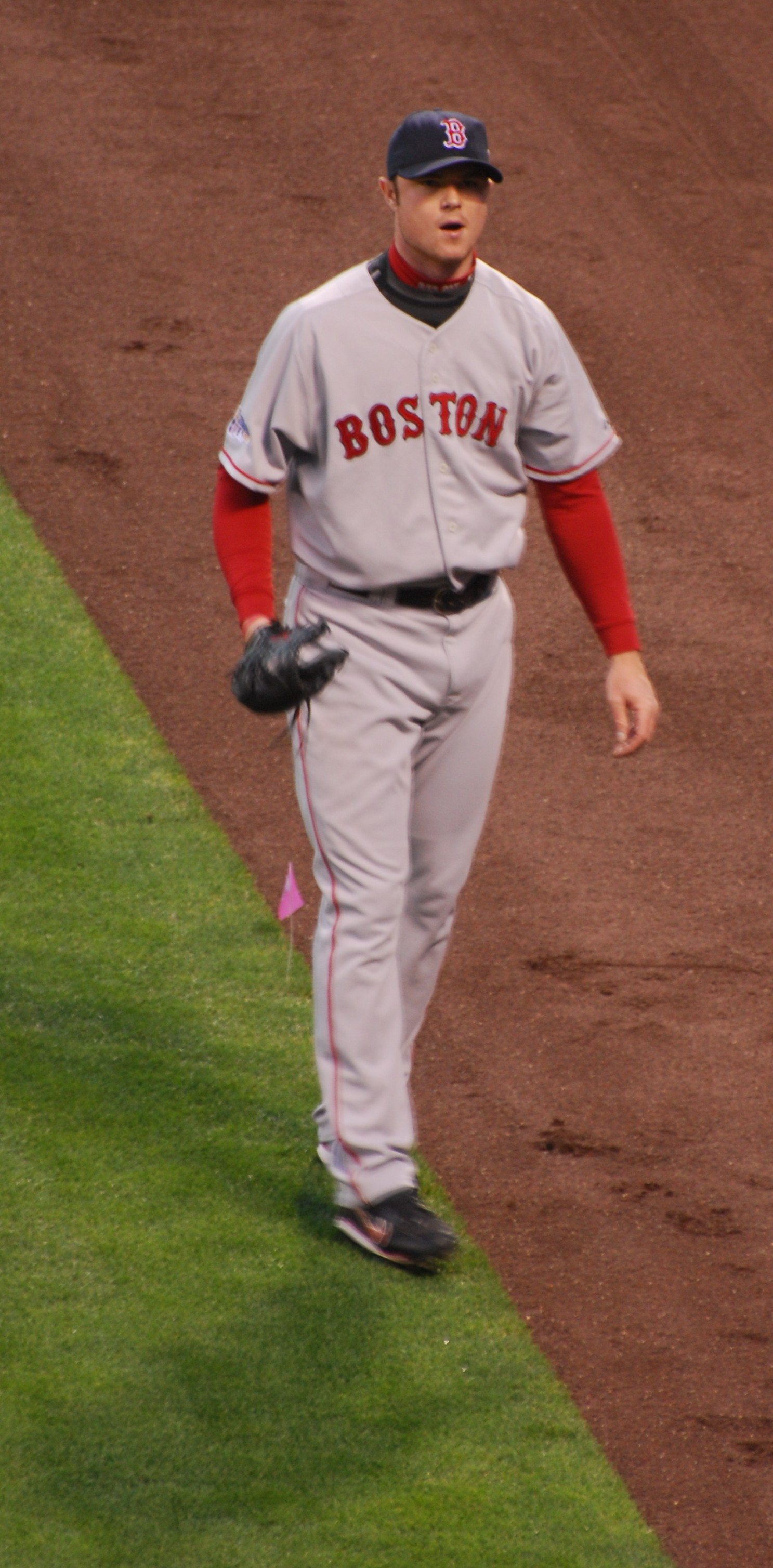
Jon Lester, the 2005 Pitcher of the Year, became a five-time MLB All-Star (2010, 2011, 2014, 2016, and 2018).

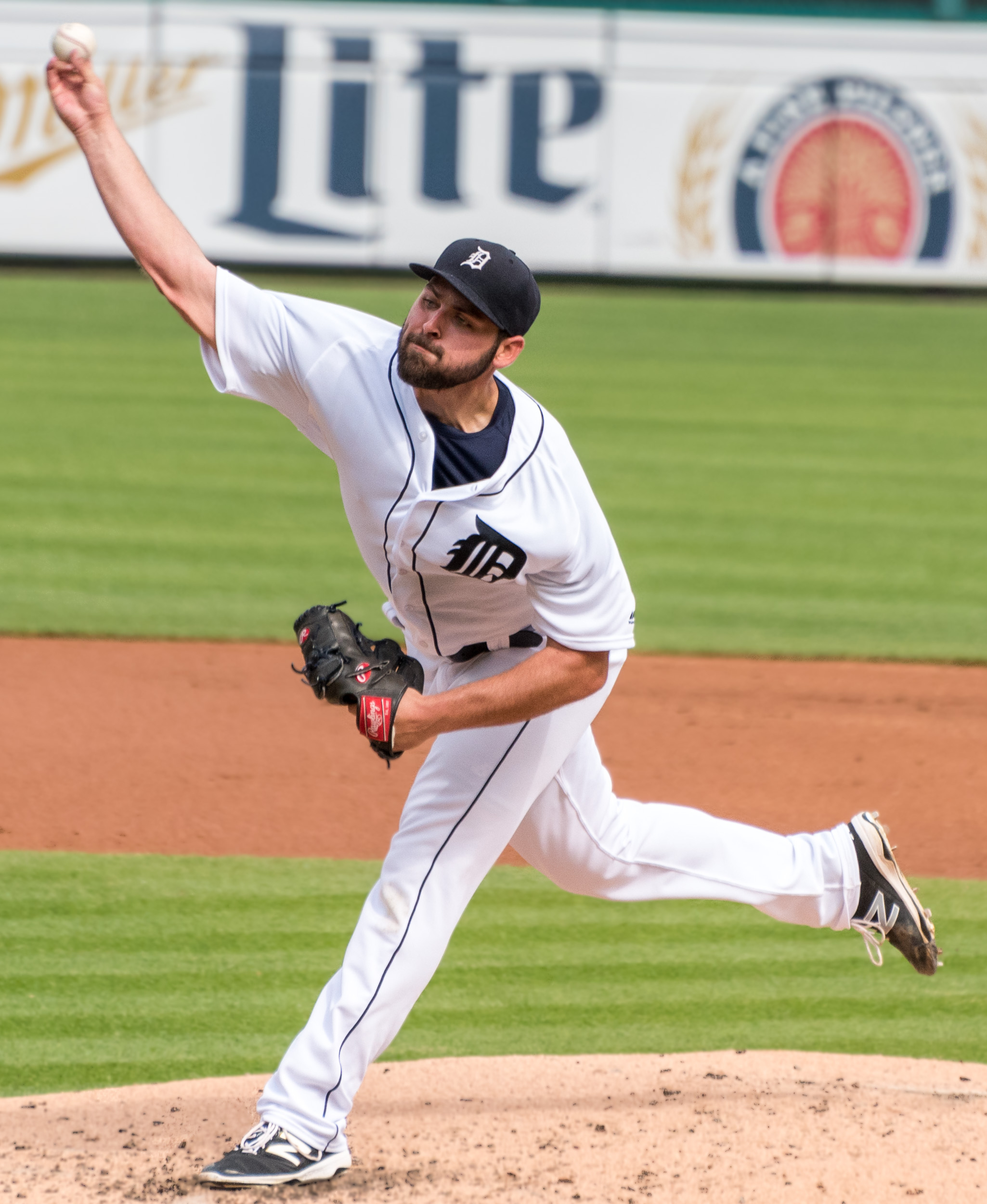
Michael Fulmer, the 2015 winner, was selected for the American League Rookie of the Year Award in 2016.

Key
Record	The pitcher's win–loss record during the regular season
Saves	The number of saves earned by the pitcher, if any, during the regular season
ERA	The pitcher's earned run average (ERA) during the regular season
SO	The number of strikeouts recorded by the pitcher during the regular season

Winners
Year	Winner	Team	Organization	Record	Saves	ERA	SO	Ref(s).
1985	Brad Arnsberg	Albany-Colonie Yankees	New York Yankees	14–2	0	1.59	82	
1986	Jim Neidlinger	Nashua Pirates	Pittsburgh Pirates	12–7	0	2.42	98	
1987	Rob Lopez	Vermont Reds	Cincinnati Reds	13–4	0	2.40	82	
1988	Cesar Mejia	Glens Falls Tigers	Detroit Tigers	14–5	0	2.43	99	
1989	Rod Imes	Albany-Colonie Yankees	New York Yankees	17–6	0	2.73	128	
1990	Mike Gardiner	Williamsport Bills	Seattle Mariners	12–8	0	1.90	149	
1991	Arthur Rhodes	Hagerstown Suns	Baltimore Orioles	7–4	0	2.70	115	
1992	Bobby Jones	Binghamton Mets	New York Mets	12–4	0	1.88	143	
1993	Joey Eischen	Harrisburg Senators	Montreal Expos	14–4	0	3.62	110	
1994	Juan Acevedo	New Haven Ravens	Colorado Rockies	17–6	0	2.37	161	
1995	Paul Wilson	Binghamton Mets	New York Mets	6–3	0	2.17	127	
1996	Carl Pavano	Trenton Thunder	Boston Red Sox	16–5	0	2.63	146	
1997	Mike Vavrek	New Haven Ravens	Colorado Rockies	12–3	0	2.57	101	
1998	Brent Stentz	New Britain Rock Cats	Minnesota Twins	1–2	43	1.98	65	
1999	Michael Tejera	Portland Sea Dogs	Florida Marlins	13–4	0	2.62	152	
2000	Greg Wooten	New Haven Ravens	Seattle Mariners	17–3	0	2.31	115	
2001	John Stephens	Bowie Baysox	Baltimore Orioles	11–4	0	1.84	130	
2002	Ryan Madson	Reading Phillies	Philadelphia Phillies	16–4	0	3.20	132	
2003	Sean Burnett	Altoona Curve	Pittsburgh Pirates	14–6	0	3.21	86	
2004	Gustavo Chacín	New Hampshire Fisher Cats	Toronto Blue Jays	16–2	0	2.86	109	
2005	Jon Lester	Portland Sea Dogs	Boston Red Sox	11–6	0	2.61	163	
2006	Adam Miller	Akron Aeros	Cleveland Indians	15–6	0	2.75	157	
2007	Alan Horne	Trenton Thunder	New York Yankees	12–4	0	3.11	165	
2008	Brad Bergesen	Bowie Baysox	Baltimore Orioles	15–6	0	3.22	72	
2009	Jeanmar Gómez	Akron Aeros	Cleveland Indians	10–4	0	3.43	109	
2010	Kyle Drabek	New Hampshire Fisher Cats	Toronto Blue Jays	14–9	0	2.94	132	
2011	Brad Peacock	Harrisburg Senators	Washington Nationals	10–2	0	2.01	129	
2012	Chris Heston	Richmond Flying Squirrels	San Francisco Giants	9–8	0	2.24	135	
2013	Anthony Ranaudo	Portland Sea Dogs	Boston Red Sox	8–4	0	2.95	106	
2014	Henry Owens	Portland Sea Dogs	Boston Red Sox	14–4	0	2.60	126	
2015	Michael Fulmer (Note: Fulmer was traded from Binghamton (New York) to Erie (Detroit) on July 31, 2015.)	Binghamton Mets; Erie SeaWolves	New York Mets; Detroit Tigers	10–3	0	2.14	116	
2016	Germán Márquez	Hartford Yard Goats	Colorado Rockies	9–6	0	2.85	126	
2017	Corey Oswalt	Binghamton Rumble Ponies	New York Mets	12–5	0	2.28	119	
2018	Keegan Akin	Bowie Baysox	Baltimore Orioles	14–7	0	3.27	142	
2019	Matt Manning	Erie SeaWolves	Detroit Tigers	11–5	0	2.56	148	
2020	None selected (season cancelled due to COVID-19 pandemic)							
2021	Grayson Rodriguez	Bowie Baysox	Baltimore Orioles	6–1	0	2.60	121	
2022	Tanner Bibee	Akron RubberDucks	Cleveland Guardians	6–1	0	1.83	81	
2023	Richard Fitts	Somerset Patriots	New York Yankees	11–5	0	3.48	163	
2024	Brandon Sproat	Binghamton Rumble Ponies	New York Mets	4–1	0	2.45	77	
2025	Jonah Tong	Binghamton Rumble Ponies	New York Mets	8–5	0	1.59	162	
2026	Anthony Eyanson (Note: Eyanson was traded from Portland (Boston) to Chesapeake (Baltimore) on August 3, 2026.)	Portland Sea Dogs; Chesapeake Baysox	Boston Red Sox; Baltimore Orioles	6–1	0	1.82	107	

== Wins by team ==
Active Eastern League teams appear in bold.

Team	Award(s)	Year(s)
**Binghamton Rumble Ponies** (Binghamton Mets)	6	1992, 1995, 2015, 2017, 2024, 2025
**Chesapeake Baysox** (Bowie Baysox)	5	2001, 2008, 2018, 2021, 2026
**Portland Sea Dogs**	5	1999, 2005, 2013, 2014, 2026
**Akron RubberDucks** (Akron Aeros)	3	2006, 2009, 2022
New Haven Ravens	3	1994, 1997, 2000
Albany-Colonie Yankees	2	1985, 1989
**Erie SeaWolves**	2	2015, 2019
**Harrisburg Senators**	2	1993, 2011
**New Hampshire Fisher Cats**	2	2004, 2010
Trenton Thunder	2	1996, 2007
**Altoona Curve**	1	2003
Glens Falls Tigers	1	1988
Hagerstown Suns	1	1991
**Hartford Yard Goats**	1	2016
Nashua Pirates	1	1996
New Britain Rock Cats	1	1998
**Reading Fightin Phils** (Reading Phillies)	1	2002
**Richmond Flying Squirrels**	1	2012
**Somerset Patriots**	1	2023
Vermont Reds	1	1987
Williamsport Bills	1	1990

== Wins by organization ==
Active Eastern League–Major League Baseball affiliations appear in bold.

Organization	Award(s)	Year(s)
**Baltimore Orioles**	6	1991, 2001, 2008, 2018, 2021, 2026
**New York Mets**	6	1992, 1995, 2015, 2017, 2024, 2025
**Boston Red Sox**	5	1996, 2005, 2013, 2014, 2026
**New York Yankees**	4	1985, 1989, 2007, 2023
**Cleveland Guardians** (Cleveland Indians)	3	2006, 2009, 2022
**Colorado Rockies**	3	1994, 1997, 2016
**Detroit Tigers**	3	1988, 2019, 2015
**Pittsburgh Pirates**	2	1986, 2003
Seattle Mariners	2	1990, 2000
**Toronto Blue Jays**	2	2004, 2010
**Washington Nationals** (Montreal Expos)	2	1993, 2011
Cincinnati Reds	1	1987
Miami Marlins (Florida Marlins)	1	1999
Minnesota Twins	1	1998
**Philadelphia Phillies**	1	2002
**San Francisco Giants**	1	2012
