= 1989 Eastern League season =

The 1989 Eastern League season began on approximately April 1 and the regular season ended on approximately September 1.

The Albany/Colonie Yankees defeated the Harrisburg Senators three games to one to win the Eastern League Championship Series.

== Regular season ==
=== Standings ===
Eastern League
Team	Win	Loss	%	GB
**Albany/Colonie Yankees**	92	48	.657	–
Canton–Akron Indians	70	69	.504	21.5
Reading Phillies	68	71	.489	23.5
**Harrisburg Senators**	67	72	.482	24.5
Hagerstown Suns	67	72	.482	24.5
London Tigers	63	76	.453	28.5
Williamsport Bills	63	77	.450	29.0
New Britain Red Sox	60	76	.441	30.0

Notes:

Green shade indicates that team advanced to the playoffs
Bold indicates that team advanced to ELCS
Italics indicates that team won ELCS

== Playoffs ==
=== Semi-finals Series ===
- Albany/Colonie Yankees defeated Reading Phillies 3 games to 1.
- Harrisburg Senators defeated Canton–Akron Indians 3 games to 2.

=== Championship Series ===
- Albany/Colonie Yankees defeated Harrisburg Senators 3 games to 1.
