= 1991 Eastern League season =

The 1991 Eastern League season began on approximately April 1 and the regular season ended on approximately September 1.

The Albany-Colonie Yankees defeated the Harrisburg Senators 3 games to 0 to win the Eastern League Championship Series.

== Regular season ==
=== Standings ===
| Eastern League | | | | |
| Team | Win | Loss | % | GB |
|---|---|---|---|---|
| **Harrisburg Senators** | 87 | 53 | .621 | – |
| Hagerstown Suns | 81 | 59 | .579 | 6.0 |
| **Albany-Colonie Yankees** | 76 | 64 | .543 | 11.0 |
| Canton–Akron Indians | 75 | 65 | .536 | 12.0 |
| Reading Phillies | 72 | 68 | .514 | 15.0 |
| London Tigers | 61 | 78 | .439 | 25.5 |
| Williamsport Bills | 60 | 79 | .432 | 26.5 |
| New Britain Red Sox | 47 | 93 | .336 | 40.0 |

Note: Green shade indicates that team advanced to the playoffs; Bold indicates that team advanced to ELCS; Italics indicates that team won ELCS

== Playoffs ==
=== Semi-finals Series ===
- The Albany-Colonie Yankees defeated the Hagerstown Suns 3 games to 0.
- The Harrisburg Senators defeated the Canton–Akron Indians 3 games to 1.

=== Championship Series ===
- The Albany-Colonie Yankees defeated the Harrisburg Senators in the ELCS 3 games to 0.
