= 1923 New York-Pennsylvania League season =

The 1923 New York–Pennsylvania League season was the league's first season of play. The Williamsport Billies became the New York–Pennsylvania League's (Now Eastern League) first champions by having the best record at the end of the regular season. The New York–Pennsylvania League played at the Class B Level during this season.

== Final standings ==
New York–Pennsylvania League
Club	Wins	Losses	Win %	GB
Williamsport Billies	82	42	.661	--
York White Roses	73	51	.589	9
Scranton Miners	68	54	.557	13
Binghamton Triplets	67	55	.549	14
Wilkes-Barre Barons	47	74	.388	33.5
Elmira Red Jackets	30	91	.248	50.5

== Stats ==
=== Batting leaders ===
Stat	Player	Total
AVG	Earl Babbington (Elmira/York)	.383
HR	Bill Batch (York)	19
RBI		
R		
H		
SB		

=== Pitching leaders ===
Stat	Player	Total
W	Gene Costello (York)	22
L		
ERA		
SO	Dudley Foulk (Williamsport)	167
IP		
SV		
