= Eastern League Top MLB Prospect Award =

- Sport: Baseball
- League: Eastern League
- Awarded for: Best regular-season rookie in the Eastern League
- Country: United States
- Presented by: Eastern League

History
- First award: Cliff Floyd (1993)
- Most recent: Franklin Arias (2026)

The Eastern League Top MLB Prospect Award is an annual award given to the best rookie player in Minor League Baseball's Eastern League based on their regular-season performance as voted on by league managers. Broadcasters, Minor League Baseball executives, and members of the media have previously voted as well. Though the league was established in 1938, the award was not created until 1993 as the Rookie of the Year Award. After the cancellation of the 2020 season, the league was known as the Double-A Northeast in 2021 before reverting to the Eastern League name in 2022. The Top MLB Prospect Award began to be issued instead of the Rookie of the Year Award in 2021.

Fourteen outfielders have won the award, the most of any position. First basemen, with seven winners, have won the most among infielders, followed by shortstops (5), third basemen (3), and second basemen (1). Three catchers and one pitcher have won the award.

Twelve players who have won the Top MLB Prospect Award also won the Eastern League Most Valuable Player Award (MVP) in the same season: Cliff Floyd (1993), Mark Grudzielanek (1994), Jay Payton (1995), Vladimir Guerrero (1996), Calvin Pickering (1998), Marlon Byrd (2001), Ryan Howard (2004), Jordan Brown (2007), Brandon Laird (2010), Darin Ruf (2012), Cavan Biggio (2018), and Franklin Arias. The only pitcher to win the award, Juan Acevedo (1994), also won the Pitcher of the Year Award in the same season.

Seven players from the Reading Fightin Phils have been selected for the Top MLB Prospect Award, more than any other team in the league, followed by the Binghamton Rumble Ponies and Harrisburg Senators (5); the Akron RubberDucks (4); the Altoona Curve, Chesapeake Baysox, New Haven Ravens, and Portland Sea Dogs (2); and the Erie SeaWolves, Hartford Yard Goats, New Hampshire Fisher Cats, Somerset Patriots, and Trenton Thunder (1).

Seven players from the Philadelphia Phillies Major League Baseball (MLB) organization have won the award, more than any other, followed by the New York Mets and Washington Nationals organizations (5); the Cleveland Guardians organization (4); the Baltimore Orioles, Colorado Rockies, Pittsburgh Pirates, and New York Yankees organizations (2); and the Boston Red Sox, Detroit Tigers, Miami Marlins, St. Louis Cardinals, and Toronto Blue Jays organizations (1).

== Winners ==
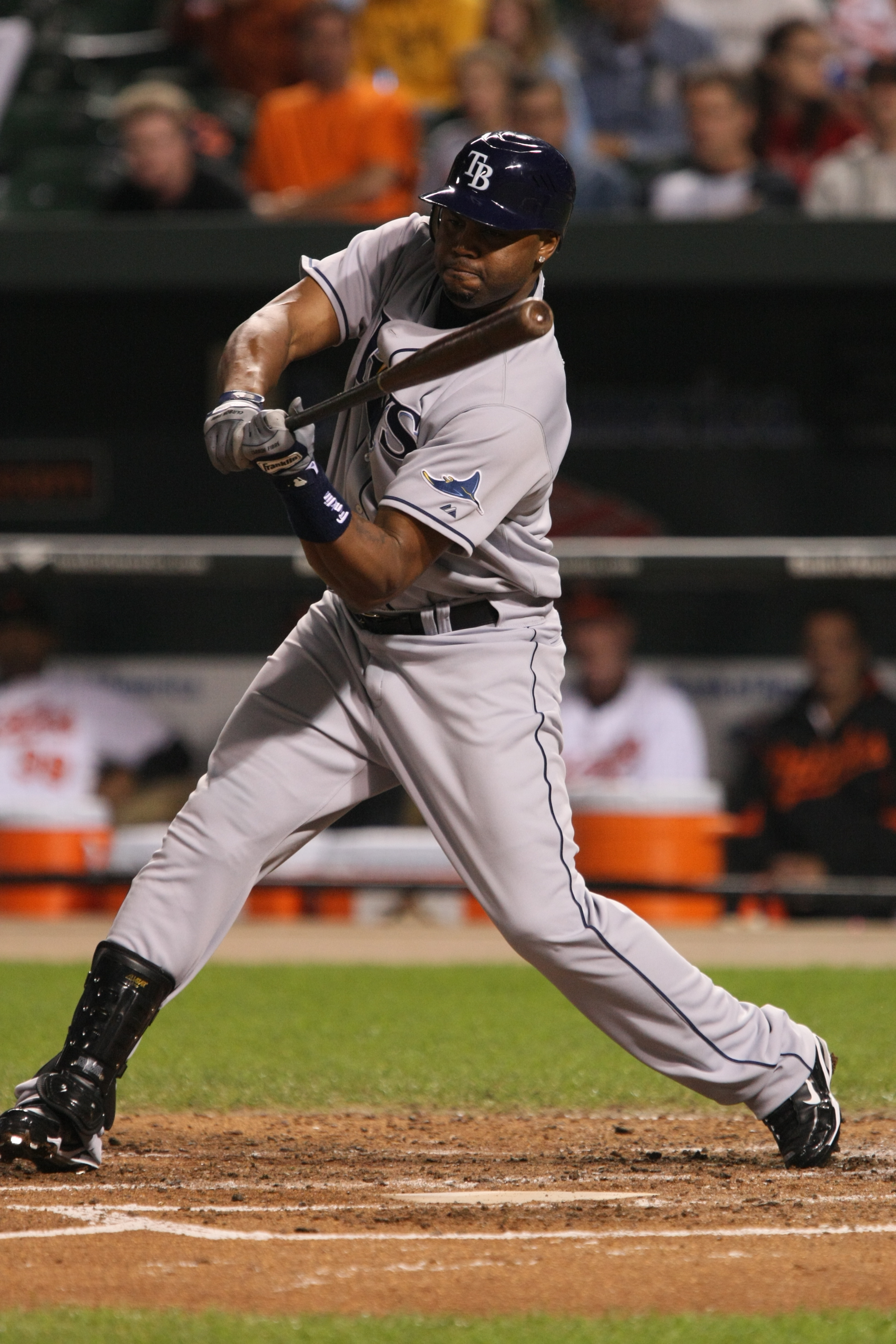
Cliff Floyd won the first Rookie of the Year Award in 1993.

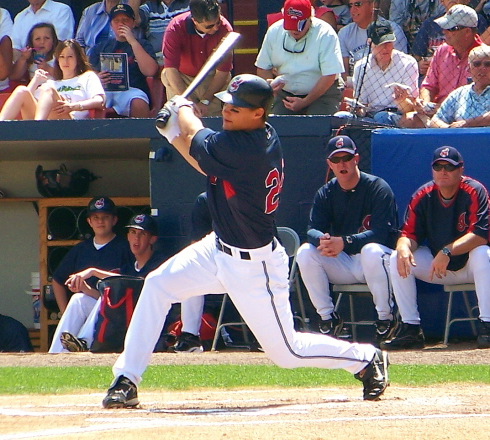
Grady Sizemore, the 2003 winner, became a three-time MLB All-Star (2006–2008).

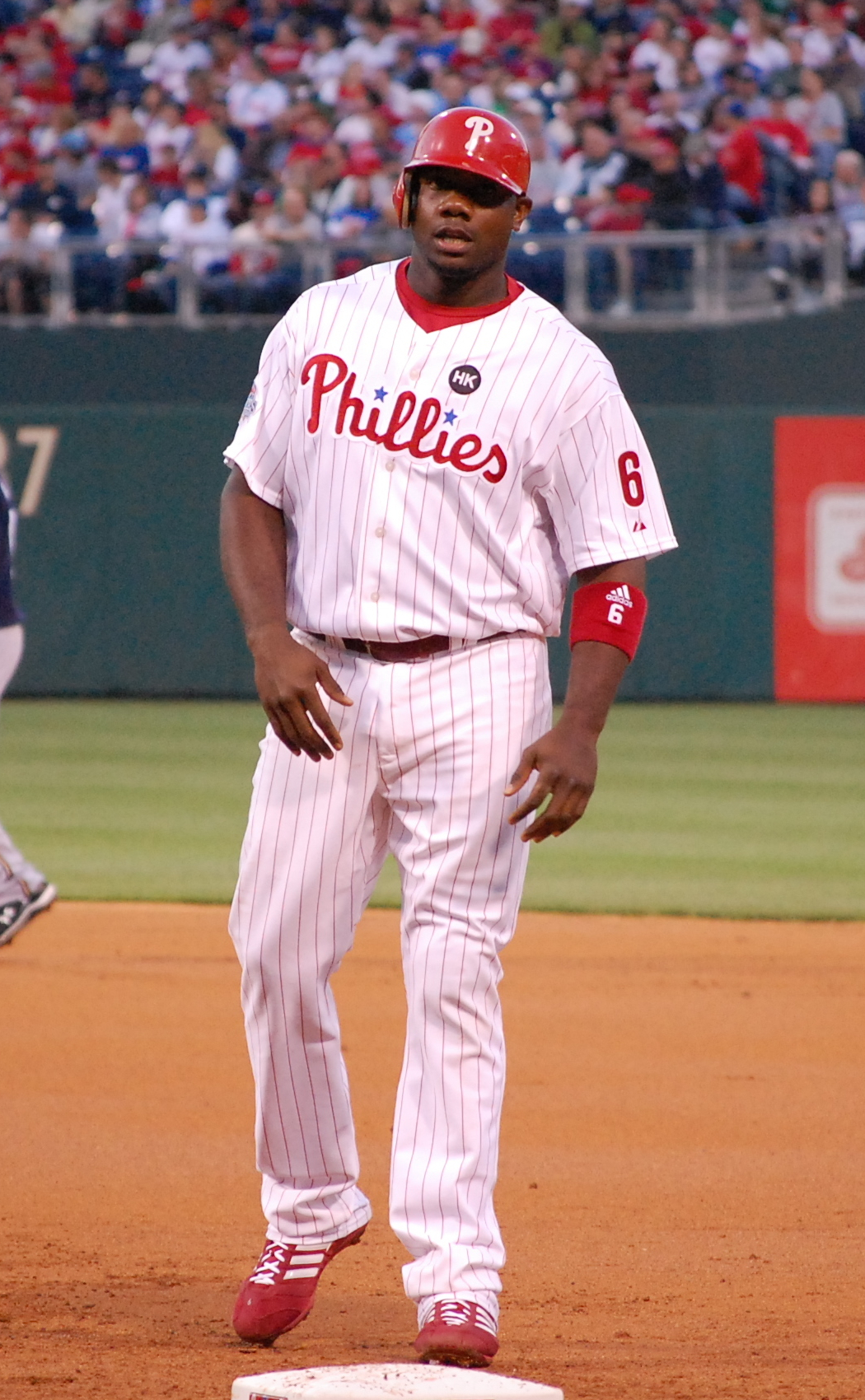
Ryan Howard, the 2004 winner, won the 2005 National League Rookie of the Year Award and the 2006 NL MVP Award.

Key
Position	Indicates the player's primary position
^	Indicates multiple award winners in the same year

Year	Winner	Team	Organization	Position	Ref(s).
1993	Cliff Floyd	Harrisburg Senators	Montreal Expos	First baseman	
1994^	Juan Acevedo	New Haven Ravens	Colorado Rockies	Pitcher	
1994^	Mark Grudzielanek	Harrisburg Senators	Montreal Expos	Shortstop	
1995	Jay Payton	Binghamton Mets	New York Mets	Outfielder	
1996	Vladimir Guerrero	Harrisburg Senators	Montreal Expos	Outfielder	
1997	Mark Kotsay	Portland Sea Dogs	Florida Marlins	Outfielder	
1998	Calvin Pickering	Bowie Baysox	Baltimore Orioles	First baseman	
1999	Pat Burrell	Reading Phillies	Philadelphia Phillies	First baseman	
2000	Alex Escobar	Binghamton Mets	New York Mets	Outfielder	
2001	Marlon Byrd	Reading Phillies	Philadelphia Phillies	Outfielder	
2002	Dee Haynes	New Haven Ravens	St. Louis Cardinals	Outfielder	
2003	Grady Sizemore	Akron Aeros	Cleveland Indians	Outfielder	
2004	Ryan Howard	Reading Phillies	Philadelphia Phillies	First baseman	
2005	Chris Roberson	Reading Phillies	Philadelphia Phillies	Outfielder	
2006	Kory Casto	Harrisburg Senators	Washington Nationals	Third baseman	
2007	Jordan Brown	Akron Aeros	Cleveland Indians	First baseman	
2008	Wes Hodges	Akron Aeros	Cleveland Indians	Third baseman	
2009	Michael D. Taylor	Reading Phillies	Philadelphia Phillies	Outfielder	
2010	Brandon Laird	Trenton Thunder	New York Yankees	Third baseman	
2011	Starling Marte	Altoona Curve	Pittsburgh Pirates	Outfielder	
2012	Darin Ruf	Reading Phillies	Philadelphia Phillies	First baseman	
2013	Alex Dickerson	Altoona Curve	Pittsburgh Pirates	Outfielder	
2014	Michael A. Taylor	Harrisburg Senators	Washington Nationals	Outfielder	
2015	Gavin Cecchini	Binghamton Mets	New York Mets	Shortstop	
2016	Rhys Hoskins	Reading Fightin Phils	Philadelphia Phillies	First baseman	
2017	Francisco Mejía	Akron RubberDucks	Cleveland Indians	Catcher	
2018	Cavan Biggio	New Hampshire Fisher Cats	Toronto Blue Jays	Second baseman	
2019	José Azócar	Erie SeaWolves	Detroit Tigers	Outfielder	
2020	None selected (season cancelled due to COVID-19 pandemic)				
2021	Adley Rutschman	Bowie Baysox	Baltimore Orioles	Catcher	
2022	Ezequiel Tovar	Hartford Yard Goats	Colorado Rockies	Shortstop	
2023	Jasson Domínguez	Somerset Patriots	New York Yankees	Outfielder	
2024	Samuel Basallo	Bowie Baysox	Baltimore Orioles	Catcher	
2025	Jett Williams	Binghamton Rumble Ponies	New York Mets	Shortstop	
2026	Franklin Arias	Portland Sea Dogs	Boston Red Sox	Shortstop	

== Wins by team ==
Active Eastern League teams appear in bold.

Team	Award(s)	Year(s)
**Reading Fightin Phils** (Reading Phillies)	7	1999, 2001, 2004, 2005, 2009, 2012, 2016
**Harrisburg Senators**	5	1993, 1994, 1996, 2006, 2014
**Akron RubberDucks** (Akron Aeros)	4	2003, 2007, 2008, 2017
**Binghamton Rumble Ponies** (Binghamton Mets)	4	1995, 2000, 2015, 2025
**Chesapeake Baysox** (Bowie Baysox)	3	1998, 2021, 2024
**Altoona Curve**	2	2011, 2013
New Haven Ravens	2	1994, 2002
**Portland Sea Dogs**	2	1997, 2026
**Erie SeaWolves**	1	2019
**Hartford Yard Goats**	1	2022
**New Hampshire Fisher Cats**	1	2018
**Somerset Patriots**	1	2023
Trenton Thunder	1	2010

== Wins by organization ==
Active Eastern League–Major League Baseball affiliations appear in bold.

Organization	Award(s)	Year(s)
**Philadelphia Phillies**	7	1999, 2001, 2004, 2005, 2009, 2012, 2016
**Washington Nationals** (Montreal Expos)	5	1993, 1994, 1996, 2006, 2014
**Cleveland Guardians** (Cleveland Indians)	4	2003, 2007, 2008, 2017
**New York Mets**	4	1995, 2000, 2015, 2025
**Baltimore Orioles**	3	1998, 2021, 2024
**Colorado Rockies**	2	1994, 2002
**New York Yankees**	2	2010, 2023
**Pittsburgh Pirates**	2	2011, 2013
**Boston Red Sox**	1	2026
**Detroit Tigers**	1	2019
Miami Marlins (Florida Marlins)	1	1997
St. Louis Cardinals	1	2002
**Toronto Blue Jays**	1	2018
