= 1924 New York – Pennsylvania League season =

The 1924 New York – Pennsylvania League season was the league's second season of play. The Williamsport Grays became the New York–Pennsylvania League (Now Eastern League) champions by having the best record at the end of the regular season. The New York–Pennsylvania League played at the Class B level during this season.

== Final standings ==
New York–Pennsylvania League
Club	Wins	Losses	Win %	GB
Williamsport Grays	87	46	.654	--
Binghamton Triplets
Elmira Colonels
Scranton Miners
Wilkes-Barre Barons
York White Roses
Harrisburg Senators
Oneonta Indians
Utica Utes

== Stats ==
=== Batting leaders ===
Stat	Player	Total
AVG	Dewey Steffens (York)	.376
HR	Roy Leavitt (Williamsport)	18
RBI		
R		
H		
SB		

=== Pitching leaders ===
Stat	Player	Total
W	Thomas George (York)	27
L		
ERA		
SO	Thomas George (York)	167
IP		
SV		
