= Coby Mayo =

American baseball player (born 2001)

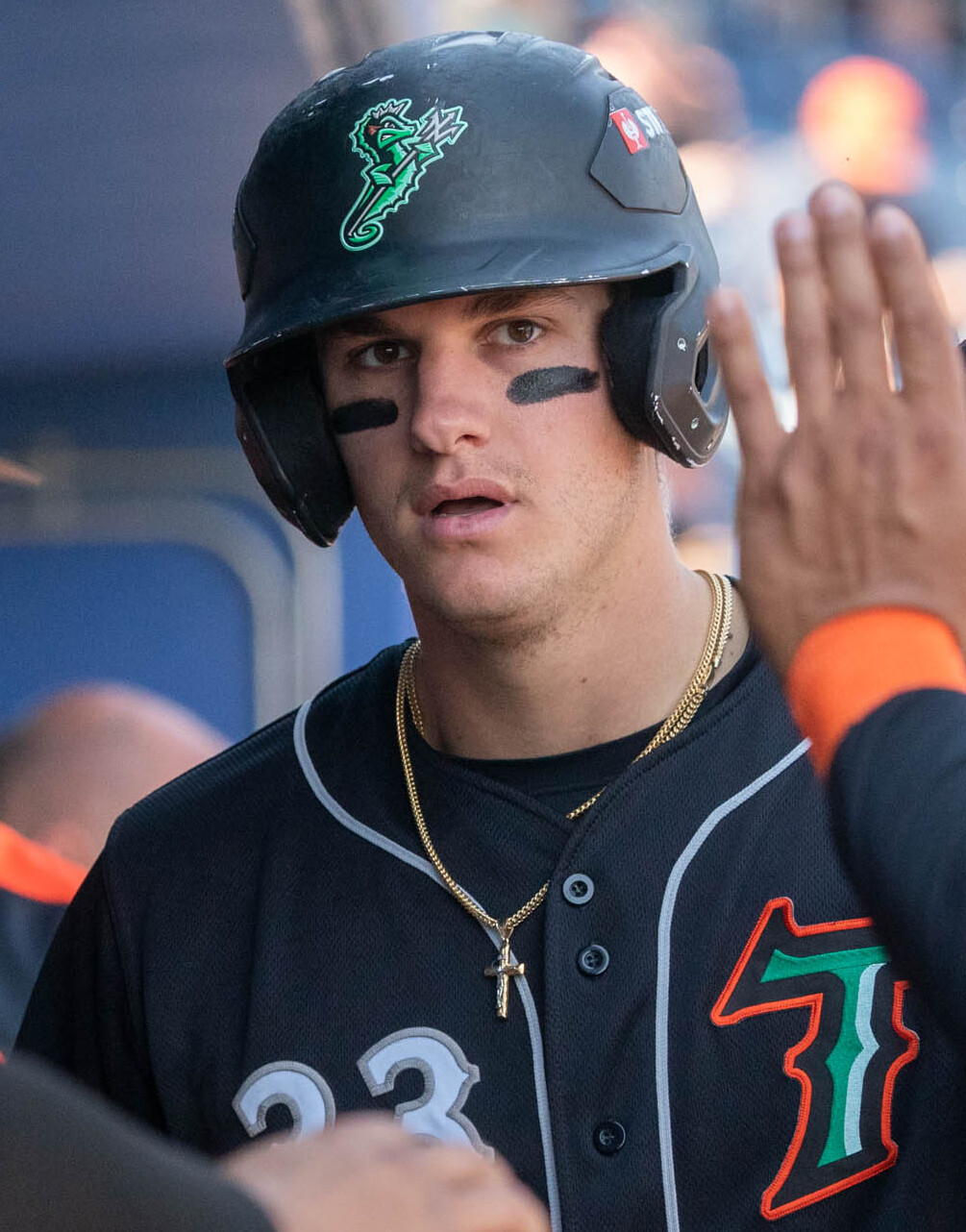
- Mayo with the Norfolk Tides in 2025

Baltimore Orioles – No. 16
- Third baseman / First baseman
- Born: December 10, 2001 (age 24); Coral Springs, Florida, U.S.
- Bats: Right Throws: Right

MLB debut
- August 2, 2024, for the Baltimore Orioles

MLB statistics (through 2026 season)
- Batting average: .216
- Home runs: 35
- Runs batted in: 91
- Stats at Baseball Reference

Teams
- Baltimore Orioles (2024–present)

Coby Gerald Mayo (born December 10, 2001) is an American professional baseball third baseman and first baseman for the Baltimore Orioles of Major League Baseball (MLB). He made his MLB debut in 2024.

== Amateur career ==
Mayo attended Marjory Stoneman Douglas High School in Parkland, Florida. As a sophomore in 2018, he batted .388 with seven home runs. He also survived the Stoneman Douglas shooting. As a junior in 2019, he hit .391 with four home runs. During the summer of 2019, he was named to the Under Armour All-America Baseball Game at Wrigley Field. As a senior in 2020, he batted .455 before the season was cancelled due to the COVID-19 pandemic.

== Professional career ==
=== Minor leagues ===
Mayo was drafted by the Baltimore Orioles in the fourth round, with the 103rd overall selection, of the 2020 Major League Baseball draft. He signed for $1.75 million, forgoing his commitment to play college baseball at the University of Florida. Mayo did not play in a professional game after signing due to the cancellation of the minor league season because of the COVID-19 pandemic. He missed time at the beginning of the 2021 season due to a knee injury. He made his professional debut that July with the Rookie-level Florida Complex League Orioles and was promoted to the Delmarva Shorebirds of the Low-A East in August. Over 53 games between the two clubs, Mayo slashed .319/.426/.555 with nine home runs, 41 RBI, 14 doubles, and 11 stolen bases. Following the season's end, he spent time at Ed Smith Stadium participating in Baltimore's fall instructional league. He was assigned to the Aberdeen IronBirds of the High-A South Atlantic League to begin the 2022 season. In late June, he was promoted to the Bowie Baysox of the Double-A Eastern League. In early July, he was placed on the injured list with back spasms before rehabbing with the Florida Complex League Orioles and being activated in early August. Over 104 games between the three teams, Mayo slashed .247/.326/.456 with 19 home runs, 69 RBI, and twenty doubles. To open the 2023 season, he returned to Bowie. In early July, Mayo was promoted to the Norfolk Tides of the Triple-A International League. Over 140 games between the two teams, he slashed .290/.410/.563 with 29 home runs, 99 RBI, and 45 doubles. He won the 2023 Eastern League Most Valuable Player Award.

Mayo was a non-roster invitee to Orioles spring training in 2024 and batted .326 with one home run and 11 RBI. He was assigned to Norfolk to open the season. In 77 games for Norfolk, he batted .301/.375/.586 with 20 home runs and 61 RBI. Mayo won the 2024 International League Top MLB Prospect Award.

=== Major leagues ===
On August 2, 2024, Mayo was promoted to the major leagues for the first time. His first MLB hit was a fifth-inning leadoff single to left field off DJ Herz to end a 0–for–16 slump in a 4–1 home win over the Washington Nationals twelve days later on August 14. He was optioned to the Tides the following day on August 15. On September 1, Mayo was recalled from the Tides after Ramón Urías was placed on the injured list. He made 17 appearances for the Orioles during his rookie campaign and batted .098 (4-for-41).

Mayo was optioned to Triple-A Norfolk to begin the 2025 season. On June 27, 2025, Mayo hit his first career home run off of José Caballero of the Tampa Bay Rays. Mayo played in 85 games for the Orioles and batted .217 with 11 home runs, 28 RBIs, and 12 doubles.

In 2026 Mayo got significantly more playing time with the Orioles, appearing in 132 games and slashing .228/.297/.461, with 24 home runs and 63 RBI. He had a strong second half of the season and was one of the league's best hitters against left-handers, hitting .322 with an OPS of 1.105 against left-handed pitching. He hit 16 of his 24 home runs against lefties, tied for most in the league. He also had one of MLB's longest home runs of the season on August 17, 2026, hitting a 468 foot home run against the Tampa Bay Rays.

== Personal life ==
Mayo was a student at Marjory Stoneman Douglas High School during the Parkland high school shooting.
