= Chris Gittens =

American baseball player (born 1994)

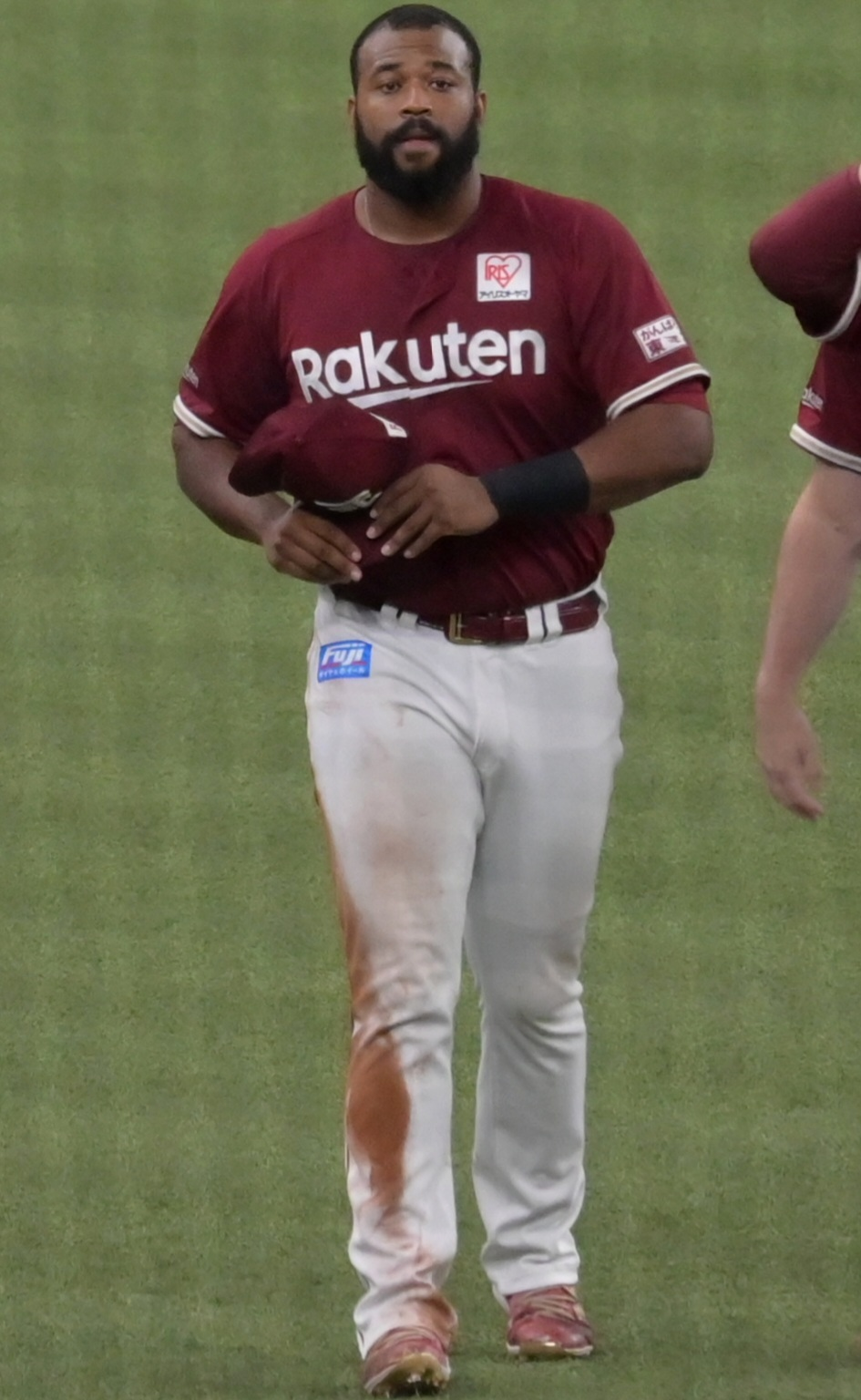
- Gittens with the Tohoku Rakuten Golden Eagles in 2022
- First baseman
- Born: February 4, 1994 (age 32); Sherman, Texas, U.S.
- Batted: Right Threw: Right

Professional debut
- MLB: June 5, 2021, for the New York Yankees
- NPB: April 4, 2022, for the Tohoku Rakuten Golden Eagles

Last appearance
- MLB: July 24, 2021, for the New York Yankees
- NPB: September 23, 2022, for the Tohoku Rakuten Golden Eagles

MLB statistics
- Batting average: .111
- Home runs: 1
- Runs batted in: 5

NPB statistics
- Batting average: .242
- Home runs: 0
- Runs batted in: 8
- Stats at Baseball Reference

Teams
- New York Yankees (2021); Tohoku Rakuten Golden Eagles (2022)

Christopher Ryan Gittens (born February 4, 1994) is an American former professional baseball first baseman. He played in Major League Baseball (MLB) for the New York Yankees and in Nippon Professional Baseball (NPB) for the Tohoku Rakuten Golden Eagles. He made his MLB debut in 2021.

== Amateur career ==
Gittens attended Sherman High School in Sherman, Texas, graduating in 2012. While at Sherman, he played for the school's baseball team as a first baseman and a pitcher. He threw a perfect game and three no-hitters for Sherman. After graduating from Sherman, he enrolled at Grayson County College. At Grayson, Gittens played for the baseball team as a first baseman and pitcher. In his second year at Grayson, in 2014, he had a .422 batting average with 12 home runs and 71 runs batted in (RBIs). He committed to transfer to the University of Arkansas at Little Rock following his sophomore year.

== Professional career ==
=== New York Yankees ===
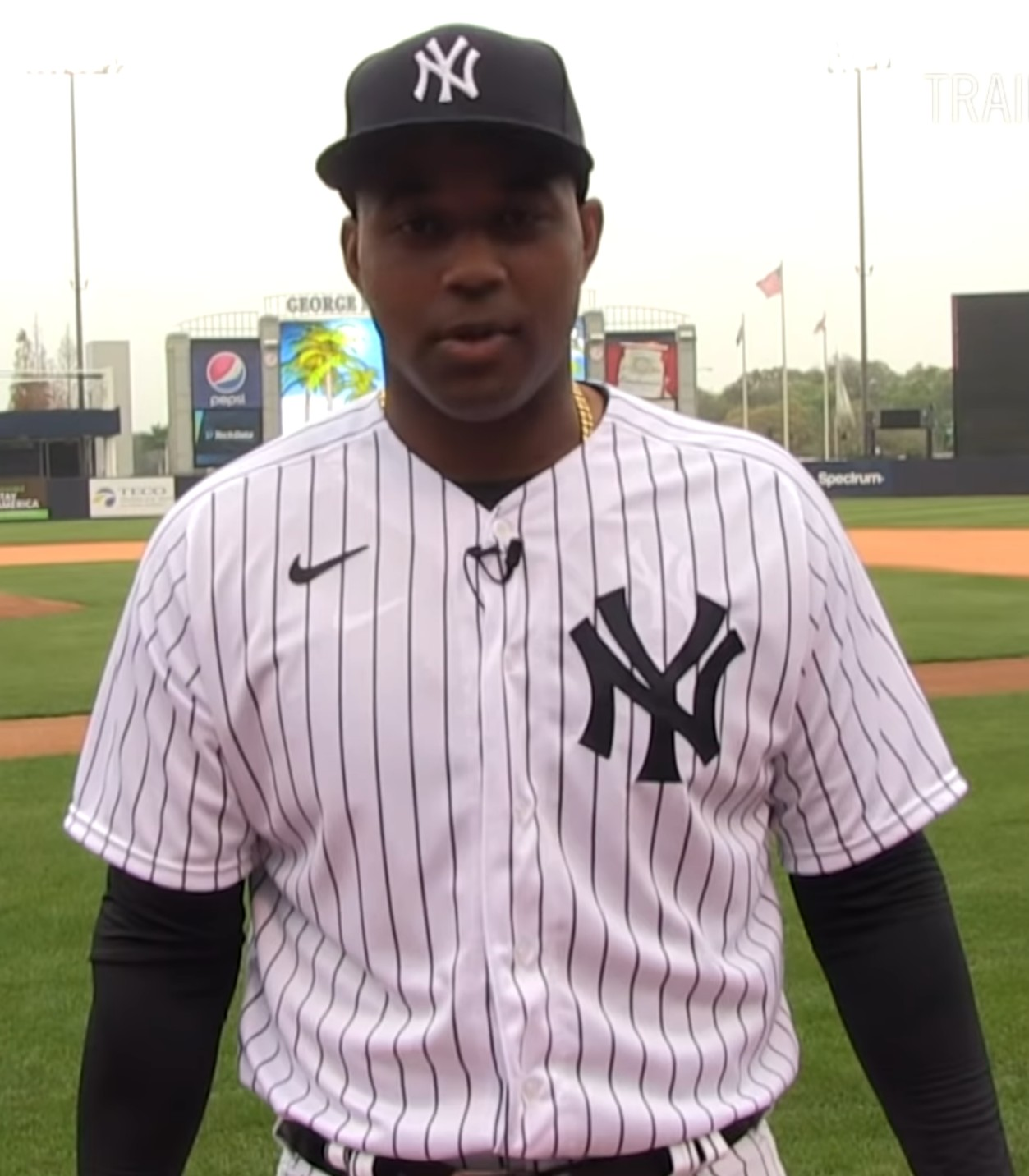
Gittens with the Yankees during 2020 spring training

The New York Yankees selected Gittens in the 12th round, with the 362nd overall selection, of the 2014 Major League Baseball draft. He signed with the Yankees for a $125,000 signing bonus, rather than enroll at Arkansas. He made his professional debut with the Gulf Coast Yankees of the Rookie-level Gulf Coast League.

In 2015, Gittens split the season between the Gulf Coast Yankees and the Tampa Yankees of the High–A Florida State League, slashing .341/.429/.594 with eight home runs and 30 RBIs. The next year, he played for the Charleston RiverDogs of the Single–A South Atlantic League, batting .253/.359/.478 with career-highs in home runs (21) and RBIs (70). In 2017, Gittens played for High-A Tampa, hitting .266/.372/.472 with 13 home runs and 43 RBIs. Gittens split the 2018 season between the Trenton Thunder of the Double–A Eastern League and the Staten Island Yankees of the Low–A New York-Penn League, posting a .193/.294/.330 batting line with six home runs and 27 RBIs in only 57 games, missing some time with a left hip injury.

In 2019, Gittens returned to Trenton, and won the Eastern League Most Valuable Player Award after hitting 281/.393/.500 with career-highs in home runs (23) and RBIs (77). His average exit velocity of 95 miles per hour (153 km/h) led all of the minor leagues. Gittens did not play in a game in 2020 due to the cancellation of the minor league season because of the COVID-19 pandemic.

In 2021, Gittens began the season with the Triple-A Scranton/Wilkes-Barre RailRiders, batting .283 with four home runs and 11 RBIs in 18 games. The Yankees promoted him to the major leagues for the first time on June 5, 2021. In his major league debut that night against the Boston Red Sox, Gittens went 0-for-3 with one walk. He recorded a home run for his first major league hit off of Toronto Blue Jays starter Hyun-jin Ryu on June 15. The Yankees optioned Gittens back to Scranton/Wilkes-Barre on June 21, with Luke Voit ready to be activated off of the injured list, after he had batted .095 with one home run in 10 games. He was named the player of the week in Triple-A East for June 21 to 27 after batting 10-for-19 (.526) with 11 RBIs for the week. The Yankees promoted Gittens back to the major leagues on July 16. In the major leagues, Gittens hit .111 with one home run and five RBIs in 36 at bats during the 2021 season. He batted .301 with 14 home runs and 44 RBIs in 45 games for the RailRiders. On November 30, Gittens was released by the Yankees.

=== Tohoku Rakuten Golden Eagles ===
On December 26, 2021, Gittens signed with the Tohoku Rakuten Golden Eagles of Nippon Professional Baseball. He did not appear in a game with the major league team in 2023 due to a lingering knee issue. He became a free agent following the 2023 season.

=== Houston Astros ===
On December 21, 2023, Gittens signed a minor league contract with the Houston Astros. On November 6, he elected free agency.

== Personal life ==
Gittens and Heather Chee, have a son, who was born in May 2021. Gittens' father told him when he was drafted in 2014 that he would not see any of his games in person until he was promoted to the major leagues. Gittens described it as "a lot of motivation, a little push for me to get where I am right now". Both of Gittens' parents attended his major league debut.
