= Brandon Laird =

American baseball player (born 1987)

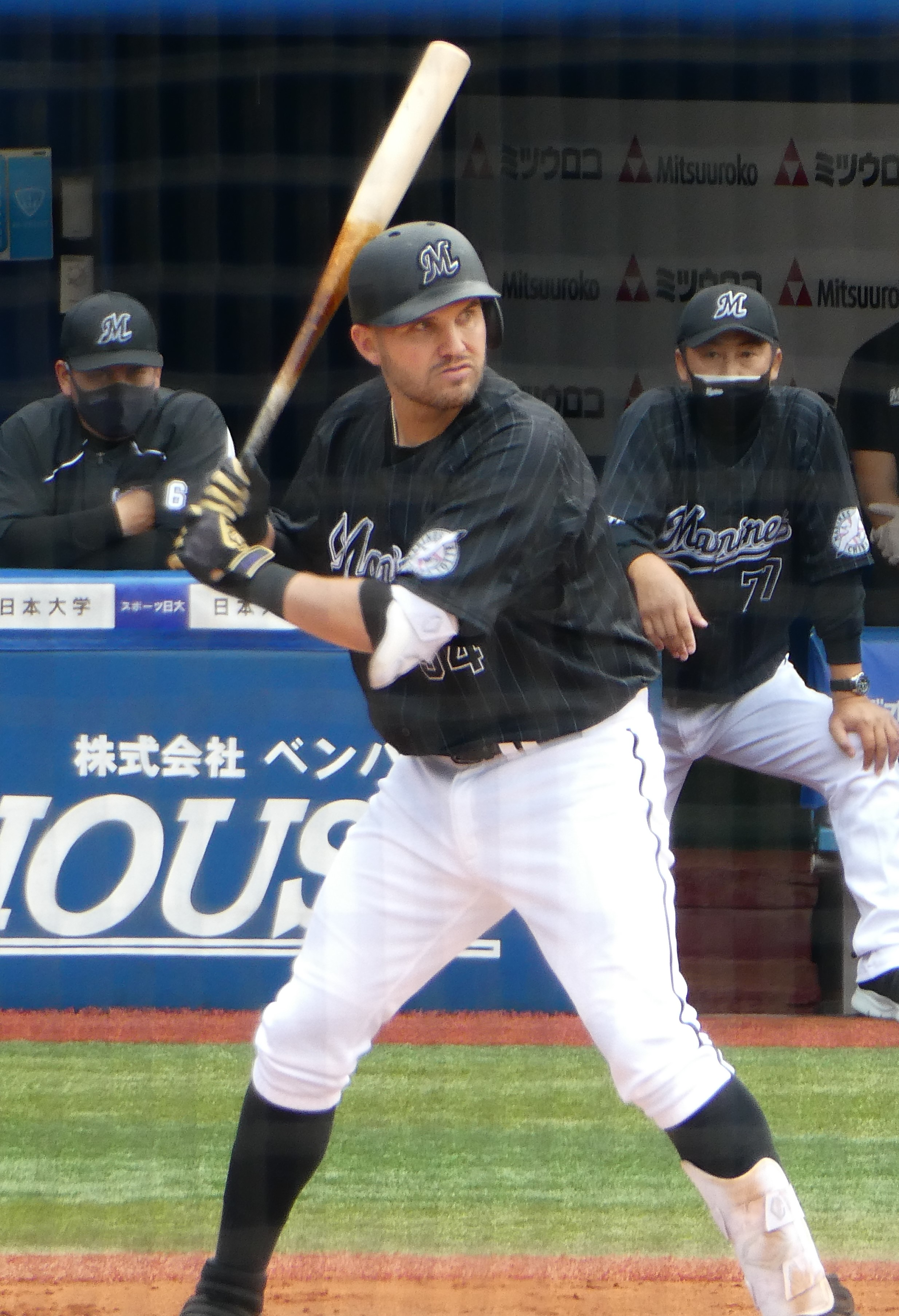
- Laird with the Chiba Lotte Marines
- Third baseman / First baseman
- Born: September 11, 1987 (age 39); Cypress, California, U.S.
- Batted: Right Threw: Right

Professional debut
- MLB: July 22, 2011, for the New York Yankees
- NPB: March 27, 2015, for the Hokkaido Nippon-Ham Fighters

Last appearance
- MLB: September 29, 2013, for the Houston Astros
- NPB: October 2, 2022, for the Chiba Lotte Marines

MLB statistics
- Batting average: .197
- Home runs: 6
- Runs batted in: 16

NPB statistics
- Batting average: .238
- Home runs: 213
- Runs batted in: 596
- Stats at Baseball Reference

Teams
- New York Yankees (2011); Houston Astros (2012–2013); Hokkaido Nippon-Ham Fighters (2015–2018); Chiba Lotte Marines (2019–2022)

Career highlights and awards
- 5× NPB All-Star (2016, 2017, 2019, 2021, 2022); Pacific League home run leader (2016); 2× Pacific League Best Nine Award (2016, 2021); Japan Series champion (2016); Japan Series MVP (2016); NPB Home Run Derby winner (2022)
Medals
Men's baseball
Representing United States
World Youth Baseball Championship
| Gold medal – first place | 2003 Kaohsiung | Team |

Brandon J. Laird (born September 11, 1987), nicknamed "Sushi Boy", is an American former professional baseball third baseman. He has played for the New York Yankees and the Houston Astros of Major League Baseball (MLB), and the Hokkaido Nippon-Ham Fighters and Chiba Lotte Marines of Nippon Professional Baseball (NPB).

== High school and college career ==
Laird attended La Quinta High School in Westminster, California. He was drafted by the Cleveland Indians in the 27th round of the 2005 Major League Baseball draft. He did not sign, opting to attend Cypress College, where he played college baseball for the Cypress Chargers.

== Professional career ==
=== New York Yankees ===
The New York Yankees selected Laird in the 27th round of the 2007 Major League Baseball draft. He signed with the Yankees. Laird was named a Post-Season All-Star for the GCL Yankees that same year after hitting .339/.367/.577 with eight homer runs and 29 RBI in 45 games. He was named a Post-Season All-Star following the 2009 season after hitting .266/.329/.415 with 13 home run and 75 RBI in 124 games for the Tampa Yankees.

Laird was a non-roster invitee to Yankees spring training before the 2010 season. On August 2, 2010, Laird was promoted from the Trenton Thunder of the Double-A Eastern League to the Scranton/Wilkes-Barre Yankees of the Triple-A International League. Laird was named both the Most Valuable Player and Rookie of the Year of the Eastern League in 2010, following a breakout season. After the 2010 season, he was added to the Yankees' 40 man roster in order to protect him from the Rule 5 Draft. Baseball America named him the organization's 10th best prospect.

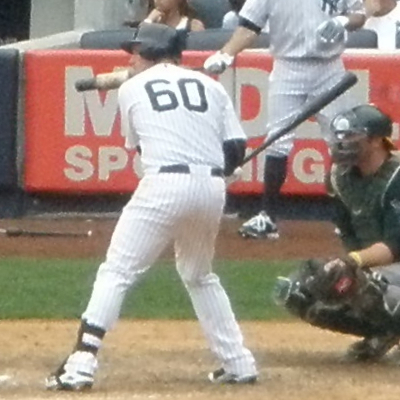
Laird with the New York Yankees in 2011

Laird was promoted to the majors for the first time on July 18, 2011, when Ramiro Peña was placed on the disabled list. On July 22, at Yankee Stadium, Laird made his major league debut, and got his first major league hit and RBI against Oakland Athletics pitcher Craig Breslow on a single to center field. He scored his first run earlier in the game, scoring on a single by Nick Swisher after working a walk off of A's pitcher Joey Devine. Following the season, he won the Rawlings Minor League Gold Glove Award at third base. The Yankees designated Laird for assignment on August 27, 2012.

=== Houston Astros ===
Laird was claimed by the Houston Astros on September 1, 2012. Laird started the 2013 season with the Triple-A Oklahoma City RedHawks. The Astros promoted Laird to the big leagues on April 18, 2013, after Brett Wallace was optioned to Oklahoma City. Laird had been hitting .353 in 12 games to earn his promotion. He was outrighted off the roster on October 2, 2013. Laird ended his 2013 season batting .169.

=== Washington Nationals ===
Laird signed a minor league deal with the Kansas City Royals on November 23, 2013. On March 15, 2014, Laird was traded to the Washington Nationals for a player to be named later. He played for the Syracuse Chiefs of the International League, and was named the league's player of the week for the week of June 16-22 and was a Post-Season All-Star.

=== Hokkaido Nippon Ham Fighters ===
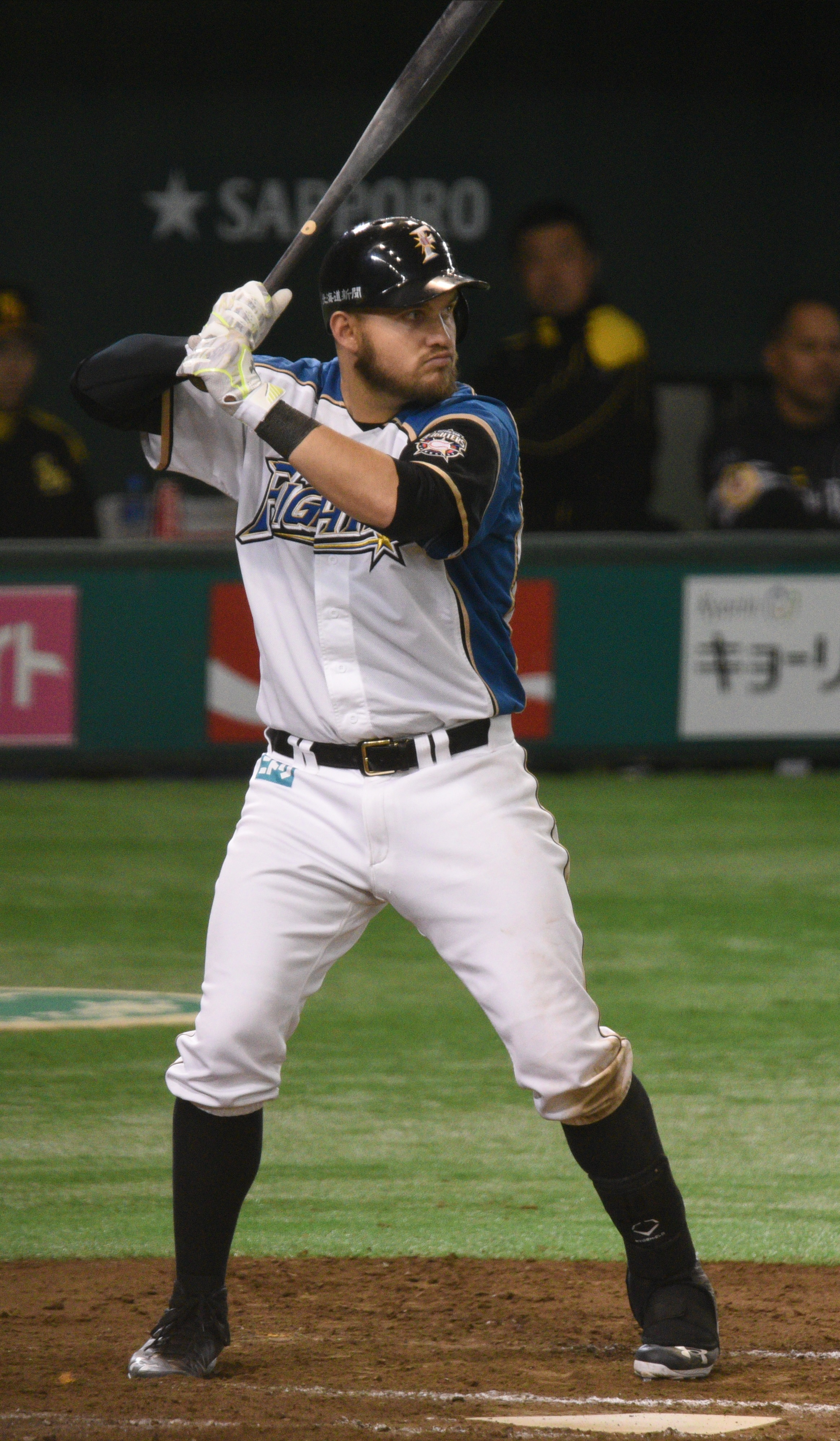
Laird with the Hokkaido Nippon-Ham Fighters in 2016

In November 2014, Laird signed with the Hokkaido Nippon-Ham Fighters of Nippon Professional Baseball (NPB). Laird struggled to start the 2015 season with Hokkaido, batting under .200 into June. On the final day of the All-Star break, Fighters third base coach Shirai took Laird out to dinner at a local sushi restaurant to get him to relax. The chef, a big Fighters fan, suggested that Laird should act like he is making sushi when he got into the batter's box to intimidate the pitcher. The next day, he did not do the gesture getting into the batter's box, but after he hit a home run, he acted like he was making sushi and thus the nickname "sushi boy" was born. He started to gain momentum after that performance and had a nice second half, finishing his first season in NPB with 34 home runs and a batting average of .231.

In May 2016, Laird made international headlines after a home run hit the Kirin sign at the Sapporo Dome, earning him a year's supply of beer and $10,000. That year, he led the Pacific League with 39 home runs. He hit the game-winning home run in Game 4 of the 2016 Japan Series, and a grand slam in Game 6. Laird won the Japan Series Most Valuable Player Award.

He played for Mexico during the 2017 World Baseball Classic. Laird spent the 2017 and 2018 seasons with the club, but failed to reach an agreement on a contract extension prior to the 2019 season and became a free agent.

=== Chiba Lotte Marines ===
On January 15, 2019, Laird signed with the Chiba Lotte Marines of NPB. On July 27, 2022 Chiba Lotte Marines hitter Brandon Laird won the 2022 NPB Home Run Derby He became a free agent following the 2022 season.

=== Mumbai Cobras ===
On October 23, 2023, Laird was selected in the fifth round by the Mumbai Cobras, with the 40th overall pick, of the 2023 Baseball United inaugural draft.

== Personal life ==
Brandon's brother, Gerald, is a catcher who played in the major leagues. In December 2010, Laird, his brother, and their uncle were arrested following an altercation at a Phoenix Suns game. The fight stemmed from accusations that Laird's grandfather had inappropriately touched the wife of Boston Celtics guard Eddie House. A relative of Laird's was killed in the 2017 Las Vegas mass shooting at Route 91 Harvest music festival.
