= NYPL =

NYPL may refer to:

- New York–Penn League, a minor baseball league in the northeastern United States
  - New York–Pennsylvania League (1923–1937)
- New York Public Library, a public library system in New York City
