= Richard Fitts =

American baseball player (born 1999)

St. Louis Cardinals – No. 35
- Pitcher
- Born: December 17, 1999 (age 26); Helena, Alabama, U.S.
- Bats: Right Throws: Right

MLB debut
- September 8, 2024, for the Boston Red Sox

MLB statistics (through 2025 season)
- Win–loss record: 2–5
- Earned run average: 3.97
- Strikeouts: 49
- Stats at Baseball Reference

Teams
- Boston Red Sox (2024–2025)

Richard Logan Fitts (born December 17, 1999) is an American professional baseball pitcher for the St. Louis Cardinals of Major League Baseball (MLB). He has previously played in MLB for the Boston Red Sox.

== Amateur career ==
Fitts grew up in Helena, Alabama, and attended Helena High School. As a senior, he had a 6–5 win–loss record with a 1.68 earned run average (ERA) and 102 strikeouts in 74 2/3 innings pitched.

Fitts enrolled at Auburn University to play college baseball for the Auburn Tigers. He began seeing more consistent playing time towards the end of his 2019 freshman season and made two appearances in the College World Series, finishing the year with a 5.31 ERA with 47 strikeouts in 62 2/3 innings pitched. Fitts made six appearances as a sophomore in 2020, with a 1–0 record and a 2.77 ERA with 16 strikeouts before the season was cut short due to the coronavirus pandemic. Fitts entered his junior season on the watchlist for the Golden Spikes Award. He finished the season with a 1–3 record, a 5.88 ERA, and 41 strikeouts over 41 1/3 innings. That summer, he played collegiate summer baseball with the Wareham Gatemen of the Cape Cod Baseball League.

== Professional career ==
=== New York Yankees ===
The New York Yankees selected Fitts in the sixth round of the 2021 Major League Baseball draft. He signed with the team and made his professional debut in 2022 with the Single–A Tampa Tarpons. After pitching to a 5.01 ERA in 17 starts, he was promoted to the High–A Hudson Valley Renegades, where he recorded an 0.55 ERA in five starts. He won the 2023 Eastern League Pitcher of the Year Award with the Double–A Somerset Patriots after logging an 11–5 record and 3.48 ERA with 163 strikeouts across 27 starts.

=== Boston Red Sox ===
On December 5, 2023, the Yankees traded Fitts, Greg Weissert, and Nicholas Judice to the Boston Red Sox in exchange for Alex Verdugo. Entering the 2024 season, he was ranked as the Red Sox' number 11 minor-league prospect by Baseball America. He began the year with the Triple–A Worcester Red Sox, compiling a 9–5 record and 4.17 ERA with 111 strikeouts over 24 games (23 starts).

On September 8, 2024, Fitts was selected to the 40-man roster and promoted to the major leagues for the first time. He made four starts for Boston during his rookie campaign, posting an 0-1 record and 1.74 ERA with nine strikeouts across 20 2/3 innings pitched.

On July 7, 2025, Fitts recorded his first career win, allowing two runs over 5 2/3 innings pitched against the Colorado Rockies. He made 11 appearances (10 starts) for Boston, logging a 2-4 record and 5.00 ERA with 40 strikeouts over 45 innings of work.

=== St. Louis Cardinals ===
On November 25, 2025, the Red Sox traded Fitts, Brandon Clarke, and Patrick Galle to the St. Louis Cardinals in exchange for Sonny Gray and cash considerations. Fitts was optioned to the Triple-A Memphis Redbirds to begin the 2026 season. In three starts for Memphis, he logged a 2-0 record and 1.76 ERA with 11 strikeouts across 15 1/3 innings pitched. On April 17, 2026, it was announced that Fitts would require season-ending surgery to address a lat strain.
