= Jordan Brown (baseball) =

American baseball player (born 1983)

- Outfielder
- Born: December 18, 1983 (age 42); Walnut Creek, California, U.S.
- Batted: Left Threw: Left

MLB debut
- August 1, 2010, for the Cleveland Indians

Last appearance
- June 30, 2013, for the Miami Marlins

MLB statistics
- Batting average: .225
- Home runs: 0
- Runs batted in: 7
- Stats at Baseball Reference

Teams
- Cleveland Indians (2010); Miami Marlins (2013)

Jordan Cassidy Brown (born December 18, 1983) is an American former professional baseball outfielder. He played in Major League Baseball (MLB) for the Cleveland Indians and Miami Marlins in 2010 and 2013.

== Amateur career ==
Brown attended Vacaville High School in Vacaville, California, and played college baseball for the University of Arizona. In 2004, he played collegiate summer baseball with the Orleans Cardinals of the Cape Cod Baseball League and was named a league all-star.

== Professional career ==
=== Cleveland Indians ===
Brown was drafted by the Cleveland Indians in the fourth round of the 2005 Major League Baseball draft, and was named the Topps Carolina League Player of the Year for 2006. In 2007, Brown was named Eastern League MVP and Rookie of the Year while playing for the Akron Aeros. Brown batted .333 with 11 home runs and 76 RBI. He was named the Indians' 2007 Minor League Player of the Year (receiving the "Lou Boudreau Award").

Brown was designated for assignment by the Indians on January 6, 2011, removing him from the 40-man roster. He was subsequently ourighted to the Triple-A Columbus Clippers on January 14.

=== Milwaukee Brewers ===
On May 2, 2011, Brown was traded to the Milwaukee Brewers in exchange for cash considerations. He spent most of the 2011 season with the Triple-A Nashville Sounds, and hit .317 with eight home runs and 51 RBI in 100 games with the team. Brown elected free agency following the season on November 2.

=== Piratas de Campeche ===
On January 22, 2012, Brown signed a minor league contract with the Houston Astros organization. However, on April 17, he signed with the Piratas de Campeche of the Mexican League. In 11 games for Campeche, Brown batted .191/.261/.310 with one home run and six RBI.

=== Milwaukee Brewers (second stint) ===
On May 1, 2012, Brown signed a minor league contract to return to the Milwaukee Brewers organization. In 104 appearances for the Triple-A Nashville Sounds, he slashed .306/.346/.440 with eight home runs and 37 RBI. Brown elected free agency following the season on November 2.

=== Miami Marlins ===
On December 3, 2012, Brown signed a minor league contract with the Miami Marlins. On May 20, 2013, the Marlins selected Brown's contract, adding him to their active roster. He played in 14 games for the team, batting .200/.235/.267 with no home runs and five RBI. On September 3, Brown was designated for assignment by Miami, and was sent outright to the Triple-A New Orleans Zephyrs two days later. He elected free agency on October 1.

=== Texas Rangers ===
On February 7, 2014, Brown signed a minor league contract with the Texas Rangers. In 32 games split between the Double-A Frisco RoughRiders and Triple-A Round Rock Express, he batted .212/.286/.363 with four home runs and 10 RBI. Brown was released by the Rangers organization on May 12.

=== Piratas de Campeche (second stint) ===
On June 3, 2014, Brown signed with the Piratas de Campeche of the Mexican League. In 61 appearances for Campeche, he batted .318/.363/.480 with eight home runs and 41 RBI. Brown was released by the Piratas on February 17, 2015.
