= Nashua Pirates =

- 1983–1986; Nashua, New Hampshire

Minor league affiliations
- Class: Double-A (1983–1986)
- League: Eastern League (1983–1986)

Major league affiliations
- Team: Pittsburgh Pirates (1984–1986); California Angels (1983)

Team data
- Name: Nashua Pirates (1984–1986); Nashua Angels (1983)
- Mascot: The Nashua Chicken (1983–1986)
- Ballpark: Holman Stadium (1983–1986)
- Owner(s)/ Operator(s): Jerome Mileur, Ben Surner & George Como

The Nashua Pirates were a minor league baseball team, based in Nashua, New Hampshire. The team started in 1983 as the Nashua Angels, an affiliate with the California Angels in the Eastern League. The club changed affiliations in 1984 to the Pittsburgh Pirates and were then renamed the Nashua Pirates. The team's home ballpark was Holman Stadium.

During the mid-1980s, Harrisburg, Pennsylvania initiated a plan to construct a ballpark for a new Minor League Baseball team in the city. This ballpark, named Riverside Stadium, attracted the Pirates, which moved the Nashua affiliate to Harrisburg. The team was renamed the Harrisburg Senators, a nod to the previous Senators franchise.

== Season-by-season ==
Year	Record	Finish	Manager	Playoffs
1983	60-80	6th	Winston Llenas	
1984	58-82	7th	Billy Scripture	
1985	66-73	6th	Johnny Lipon	
1986	62-78	8th	Dennis Rogers	
