= Williamsport Red Sox =

Minor league baseball team in the 1960s and 1970s

- 1964–1972; Williamsport, Pennsylvania

Minor league affiliations
- Previous classes: Short-Season A (1968–1972); Class-AA (1964–1967)
- Previous leagues: New York–Penn League (1968–1972); Eastern League (1964–1967)

Major league affiliations
- Previous teams: Boston Red Sox (1971–1972); Houston Astros (1968–1970); New York Mets (1964–1967)

Team data
- Previous names: Williamsport Red Sox (1971–1972); Williamsport Astros (1968–1970); Williamsport Mets (1964–1967)

The Williamsport Red Sox were a minor league baseball team, based in Williamsport, Pennsylvania. The team began in 1964 as the Williamsport Mets a class-AA affiliate of the New York Mets, in the Eastern League, from 1964 through 1967. The club played all of its games at Williamsport's Bowman Stadium. Among the future major leaguers who played for the Williamsport Mets are: Jerry Koosman, Ken Boswell, Kevin Collins, Nolan Ryan and Jim Bethke. During the 1967 season, the New York Mets announced that the team would leave Williamsport at the end of the season.

In 1968, the club re-organized as the Williamsport Astros, dropping down from AA to the Short-season A New York–Penn League. The team's roster consisted of players both from the team's main major league affiliate, the Houston Astros, as well as some additional players from the Philadelphia Phillies.

After a particularly bad 1970 season, the club changed its affiliation to the Boston Red Sox and its name to the Williamsport Red Sox. Managed by Dick Berardino, the Red Sox went 30-39-1 their first season, finishing 6th in the 8-team NY-Penn. Steve Foran (10-4, 2.38) was the only All-Star, striking out a league-high 138 in 117 innings and also leading in wins and finishing 5th in ERA. 1B Jack Baker (.249/~.358/.502) was second in the league with 12 homers. The most prominent player to emerge from the team, though, was clearly OF Jim Rice, who was far from a star that year with a .256/~.308/.409 line.

The Red Sox continued under Berardino in 1972 but finished last at 22-47. They drew 19,038 fans, 5th in the league, and were outscored 411-278. The team managed no All-Stars though they again had the #2 home run hitter – this time it was 1B-OF Chester Lucas (.285/~.366/.500), who hit 12 long balls. The best career would belong to Don Aase, who led the league in losses with a miserable 0-10, 5.81 season. The team did not play another season.

Sources: 1972 and 1973 Baseball Guides

== Notable alumni ==
- Jim Rice (1971) Inducted Baseball Hall of Fame, 2009
- Nolan Ryan (1966) Inducted Baseball Hall of Fame, 1999
- Don Aase (1972) MLB All-Star
- Bo Diaz (1971) 2x MLB All-Star
- Duffy Dyer (1966-1967)
- Ken Forsch (1968) 2x MLB All-Star
- Jerry Koosman (1965) 2x MLB All-Star
- Steve Renko (1966)
- Roy Sievers (1967, MGR) 5x MLB All-Star; 1949 AL Rookie of the Year
- Ron Swoboda (1964)
- Bill Virdon (1966, MGR) 1955 NL Rookie of the Year
- Ernie Whitt (1972) MLB All-Star

== Year-by-year record ==
Year	Record	Finish	Manager	Playoffs
1964	56-84	5th	Ernie White	Did not qualify
1965	67-73	4th	Kerby Farrell & Bunky Warren	Did not qualify
1966	68-72	4th	Bill Virdon	Did not qualify
1967	73-66	4th	Roy Sievers	Did not qualify
1968	40-35	3rd	Dick Bogard	Lost in 1st round
1969	39-36	4th	Billy Smith	Did not qualify
1970	28-42	8th	Dick Bogard	Did not qualify
1971	30-39	6th	Dick Berardino	Did not qualify
1972	22-47	8th	Dick Berardino	Did not qualify
