= Tom Fisher (1960s pitcher) =

American baseball player (1942–2016)

- Pitcher
- Born: April 4, 1942; Cleveland, Ohio, U.S.
- Died: November 21, 2016 (aged 74); Avon, Indiana, U.S.
- Batted: Right Threw: Right

MLB debut
- September 20, 1967, for the Baltimore Orioles

Last MLB appearance
- September 22, 1967, for the Baltimore Orioles

MLB statistics
- Win–loss record: 0–0
- Earned run average: 0.00
- Strikeouts: 1
- Stats at Baseball Reference

Teams
- Baltimore Orioles (1967)

Thomas Gene Fisher (April 4, 1942 – November 21, 2016) was an American Major League Baseball pitcher. Nicknamed "Big Fish", the 6'0", 180 lb. right-hander was signed by the Baltimore Orioles as an amateur free agent before the 1962 season. He played briefly for the Orioles in 1967.

Fisher had a record of 10–6 with a 3.04 earned run average for the Triple-A Rochester Red Wings when he was called up to Baltimore in September 1967. His career minor league record at the time was 65–33, a winning percentage of .663. He made his major league debut in relief on September 20 against the Washington Senators at D.C. Stadium. He pitched 1.1 scoreless innings, walking two batters. His second big league action came two days later, in a home game against the Boston Red Sox. He hurled two more scoreless innings, striking out one batter, All-Star catcher Elston Howard.

On April 30, 1969 he was traded by the Orioles along with pitcher John O'Donoghue to the Seattle Pilots, and never again made it to the major league level. His lifetime ERA for 3.1 innings stands at 0.00.

== Minor League Trivia ==
- Fisher led Northern League pitchers with 16 complete games while playing for the Aberdeen Pheasants in 1964.
- He led Eastern League pitchers in complete games (16), shutouts (4), winning percentage (.700), strikeouts (142), and ERA (1.88) while playing for the Elmira Pioneers in 1966.
- He tied for the International League lead with 5 shutouts in 1967.
