= Franklin Arias =

Venezuelan baseball player (born 2005)

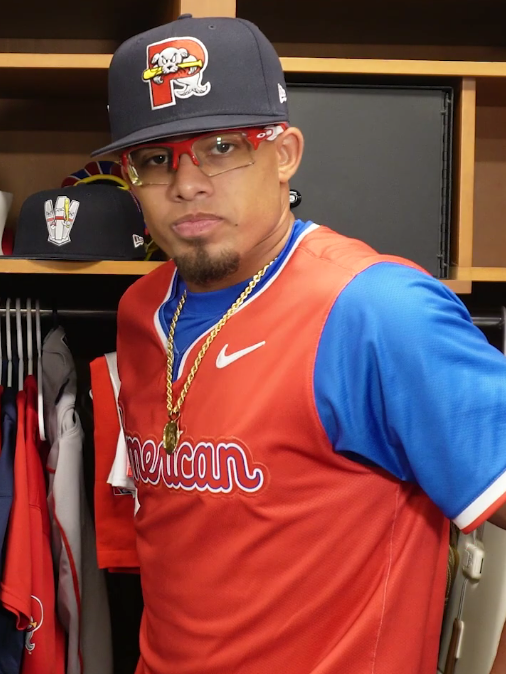
- Arias at the 2026 All-Star Futures Game

Boston Red Sox
- Shortstop / Second baseman
- Born: November 19, 2005 (age 20); Caracas, Venezuela
- Bats: Right Throws: Right
- Stats at Baseball Reference

Franklin Alexander Arias (born November 19, 2005) is a Venezuelan professional baseball shortstop and second baseman in the Boston Red Sox organization. He currently plays for the Red Sox AAA affiliate, the Worcester Red Sox. He is currently MLB's number 2 prospect.

== Career ==
Arias signed with the Boston Red Sox as an international free agent in January 2023. He made his professional debut that year with the Dominican Summer League Red Sox.

Arias played 2024 with the Florida Complex League Red Sox and Salem Red Sox. He played 2025 with Salem Red Sox, Greenville Drive, and Portland Sea Dogs. He opened 2026 with the Portland Sea Dogs and was promoted to the Triple-A Worcester Red Sox in July. In September, he was named the Red Sox’ minor league offensive player of the year.
