= Charleston Indians =

Minor League Baseball team

- 1962–1964; Charleston, West Virginia

Minor league affiliations
- Previous classes: Double-A
- League: Eastern League

Major league affiliations
- Previous teams: Cleveland Indians

Minor league titles
- League titles (1): 1963

Team data
- Previous parks: Watt Powell Park

The Charleston Indians were an American minor league baseball team based in Charleston, West Virginia. They were an affiliate of the Cleveland Indians in the Eastern League from 1962-1964. They were previously the Reading Indians.
