= Glens Falls Tigers =

- 1980–1988; Glens Falls, New York

Minor league affiliations
- Class: Double-A (1980–1988)
- League: Eastern League (1980–1988)
- Division: North (1980–1982)

Major league affiliations
- Teams: Chicago White Sox (1980–1985); Detroit Tigers (1986–1988)

Minor league titles
- Division titles (1): 1981

Team data
- Name: Glens Falls Tigers (1986–1988); Glens Falls White Sox (1980–1985)
- Ballpark: East Field Stadium (1980–1988)

The Glens Falls Tigers (formerly the Glens Falls White Sox) were an American Minor League Baseball team from Glens Falls, New York, that played in the Eastern League from 1980 until 1988. Their home ballpark was East Field Stadium. The team was founded in 1980 as the Glens Falls White Sox, the Double-A affiliate of the Chicago White Sox. In 1986, the team affiliated with the Detroit Tigers and changed their name to Glens Falls Tigers to reflect the new affiliation. After the 1988 season, the franchise moved to London, Ontario, and became the London Tigers in 1989. The franchise relocated to Trenton, New Jersey, as the Trenton Thunder in 1994. In 2021, the organization became members of the collegiate summer baseball MLB Draft League.

== Season-by-season results ==
Glens Falls White Sox
Season	Affiliation	Manager	Record
1980	White Sox	Mike Pazik	63–74, 4th place North
1981	White Sox	Jim Mahoney	83–52, 1st place North
1982	White Sox	Jim Maloney	77-63, 2nd place North
1983	White Sox	Adrian Garrett	53–83, 8th place league
1984	White Sox	John Boles	75–63, 2nd place league
1985	White Sox	Steve Dillard	68–71, 5th place league

Glens Falls Tigers
Season	Affiliation	Manager	Record
1986	Tigers	Bob Schaefer	67–71, 4th place league
1987	Tigers	Tom Burgess, Paul Felix, & Tom Gamboa	58–79, 8th place league
1988	Tigers	John Wockenfuss	80–57, 1st place league

=== Playoff appearances ===
- 1981 season: Lost to Bristol 3–2 in championship series
- 1982 season: Lost to Lynn, 2–0 in semifinals
- 1984 season: Lost to Waterbury, 3–1 in semifinals
- 1986 season: Lost to Reading, 3–1 in semifinals
- 1988 season: Lost to Albany/Colonie, 3–1 in semifinals
