= Williamsport Grays =

- 1923–1962; Williamsport, Pennsylvania

Minor league affiliations
- Previous classes: Class A (1933–1962); Class B (1924–1932)
- League: Eastern League 1938–1962; New York–Penn League 1924–1937

Major league affiliations
- Previous teams: Philadelphia Phillies (1958–1962); Pittsburgh Pirates (1954–1956); Philadelphia Athletics (1953); Detroit Tigers (1946–1952); Washington Senators (1944–1945); Philadelphia Athletics (1933–1942); Cleveland Indians (1932)

Minor league titles
- League titles: 3 (1923, 1934, 1960)

Team data
- Previous names: Williamsport Grays (1954–1962); Williamsport Athletics (1953); Williamsport Tigers (1951–1952); Williamsport Grays (1950); Williamsport Tigers (1947–1949); Williamsport Grays (1924–1937); Williamsport Billies (1923)
- Previous parks: Bowman Field (1926–1962); Williamsport High School athletic fields (1923-1925)

The Williamsport Grays were a minor league baseball team in Williamsport, Pennsylvania between 1923 and 1962. The club began play in 1923 in the New York–Pennsylvania League and were a charter member of the Eastern League in 1938. The team was renamed the Williamsport Tigers and Williamsport Athletics in this period. The Grays played at Williamsport's Bowman Field from the park's opening in 1926.

== Williamsport Grays, 1923-1946 ==
The club was established in 1923 as a charter member of the New York–Pennsylvania League. The team was called the Williamsport Billies by the local media. Other names found in local papers included the Bald Eagles, Hinchmanites, and even the Bills, a name later adopted by the Eastern League clubs in the 1980s. The Billies played their games at Williamsport High School athletic fields, now on the campus of the Pennsylvania College of Technology.

The Billies were league champions in 1923 with a record of 82-42. The most prominent player was Mule Haas who would go on to play for the Philadelphia Athletics from 1929 to 1931.

The team changed its name to the Williamsport Grays for the 1925 season. In 1938, the New York-Pennsylvania League renamed itself the Eastern League and the Grays continued play in the league through 1946.

== Williamsport Tigers, 1947-1952 ==
From 1947–1949 and again in 1951–1952, The team was named the Williamsport Tigers were a AA affiliate of the Detroit Tigers. Detroit had a working relationship with Williamsport from 1946 until 1952.

Earle Halstead was a former American Association umpire and businessman from Dearborn, Michigan. Halstead gave up his business ventures in favor of owning the Williamsport team in 1945. Halstead arranged for the Williamsport franchise to have a working agreement with the Detroit Tigers of the American League.

The Tigers had been the 1945 World Series champions. Local fans were hopeful that the Tigers would fill the roster of the Williamsport team with better players that had previously been sent to Williamsport by the Washington Senators and Philadelphia A's. The Tigers took control of the franchise in 1947 and improved Bowman Field by spending $40,000 to repair flood damage and installing grandstand seats from Briggs Stadium in Detroit.

The Williamsport Grays changed their name to the Tigers for the 1947 season. This was their second year of affiliation with Detroit Tigers, and it was the first time that the Eastern League team in Williamsport was known as something other than the Grays. The 1947 club was managed by George Detore. The Tigers finished in 5th place of an eight team league with a record of 67 wins and 74 losses.

The 1948 season saw the Tigers have a change in manager with Gene Desautels taking over. The Tigers finished in fourth place in the Eastern League and reached a one-game playoff for the final spot in the league playoffs. The Tigers lost that game to the Hartford Chiefs. Lou Kretlow who would go on to play in the majors for the Tigers, St. Louis Browns, Baltimore Orioles, Chicago White Sox and the A's was named the league's Most Valuable Player.

The Tigers slipped back into mediocrity during the 1949, 1951 and 1952 seasons. Notable players and managers to pass through Williamsport during these years included, Jack Tighe, Schoolboy Rowe and Hall of Famer Jim Bunning.

The franchise was sold at the end of the 1952 season to five anonymous businessmen for $7,500. The Tigers era ended at the same time when the team was once again aligned with the Philadelphia A's and the Williamsport Grays name was restored.

== Williamsport Athletics and Williamsport Grays, 1953-1962 ==
In 1953, the club was referred to as the Williamsport A's or Williamsport Athletics a Class AA affiliate of the Philadelphia Athletics. The Athletics names lasted for just the 1953 season. The franchise was purchased at the end of the 1952 season by five anonymous businessmen from the Detroit Tigers. The ownership group moved to establish a working arrangement with the Philadelphia A's owned by Connie Mack.

The Williamsport A's struggled on the field. They finished in sixth place with a record of 65 wins and 85 losses. The first African-Americans to play professional baseball in Williamsport were members of the squad. Joe Taylor a veteran of the Negro leagues and Héctor López who would go on to play in the majors with the A's and New York Yankees played the full season for the Williamsport A's.

The Williamsport Grays were the Philadelphia Phillies' minor league affiliate in the Eastern League from 1958 to 1962. On July 31, 1962, the Phillies traveled to Williamsport and lost to the Grays 4 to 1 at Bowman Field in a mid season exhibition game.

== Year-by-year record ==
Year	Record	Finish	Manager	Playoffs
1923	82-42	1st	Harry Hinchman	League Champs
1924	87-46	1st	Harry Hinchman	none
1925	77-55	1st (t)	Harry Hinchman	Lost League Finals
1926	69-65	3rd	Harry Hinchman	none
1927	56-80	8th	George Burns	none
1928	69-71	4th	George Burns	none
1929	79-60	2nd	Glenn Killinger	none
1930	74-65	3rd	Glenn Killinger	none
1931	76-64	3rd	Glenn Killinger	none
1932	63-76	7th	Herbie Moran / Harry Hinchman / Glenn Killinger	none
1933	64-73	6th	Mike McNally	none
1934	78-60	1st	Mike McNally	League Champs
1935	64-69	5th	Mike McNally	
1936	78-62	4th	Mike McNally	
1937	67-69	5th	Ollie Marquardt	
1938	65-74	6th	Marty McManus	
1939	71-69	6th	Marty McManus	
1940	60-74	7th	Fresco Thompson	
1941	82-55	2nd	Spencer Abbott	Lost League Finals
1942	76-63	5th	Spencer Abbott	
1944	64-75	5th	Ray Kolp	
1945	52-85	8th	Ray Kolp	
1946	59-80	6th (t)	Nig Lipscomb / Harry Davis	
1947	66-74	5th	George Detore	
1948	73-68	5th	Gene Desautels	Lost one game playoff for 4th place
1949	66-74	5th (t)	Gene Desautels	
1950	61-77	6th	Jack Tighe	
1951	55-84	7th	Schoolboy Rowe	
1952	48-90	8th	Paul Campbell	
1953	65-85	6th	George Staller	
1954	63-77	7th	Larry Shepard	
1955	71-66	5th	Larry Shepard	
1956	60-78	7th	John Fitzpatrick	
1958	67-65	5th	Dick Carter	Lost in 1st round
1959	81-60	3rd	Frank Lucchesi	Lost League Finals
1960	76-62	1st	Frank Lucchesi	Co-Champs *
1961	79-61	2nd	Andy Seminick	none
1962	83-57	1st	Frank Lucchesi	Lost League Finals

* Williamsport led Springfield Giants 1 game to 0 when rain hit. Co-champions were declared
