= Calvin Pickering =

American baseball player (born 1976)

- First baseman
- Born: September 29, 1976 (age 49); Saint Thomas, U.S. Virgin Islands
- Batted: Left Threw: Left

Professional debut
- MLB: September 12, 1998, for the Baltimore Orioles
- KBO: 2006, for the SK Wyverns

Last appearance
- MLB: April 25, 2005, for the Kansas City Royals
- KBO: 2006, for the SK Wyverns

MLB statistics
- Batting average: .223
- Home runs: 14
- Runs batted in: 45

KBO statistics
- Batting average: .278
- Home runs: 9
- Runs batted in: 34
- Stats at Baseball Reference

Teams
- Baltimore Orioles (1998–1999); Cincinnati Reds (2001); Boston Red Sox (2001); Kansas City Royals (2004–2005); SK Wyverns (2006)

Calvin Elroy Pickering (born September 29, 1976) is a former professional baseball first baseman. He played in Major League Baseball between 1998 and 2005 for the Baltimore Orioles (1998–1999), Cincinnati Reds (2001), Boston Red Sox (2001), and Kansas City Royals (2004–2005). He also played for the SK Wyverns of the KBO League in 2005.

== Career ==
Pickering was selected by the Baltimore Orioles in the 35th round of the 1995 MLB draft. In 1996, he posted a .325 batting average with 18 home runs and 66 RBI for the Bluefield Orioles, becoming the first rookie-level Oriole to be named the top player in the organization. The following year, Pickering led the Single-A Delmarva Shorebirds to a South Atlantic League title by hitting .311 with 25 home runs and 79 RBI. He was promoted to the Bowie Baysox in Double-A, where he began the 1998 season batting 4-for-41. That season, hit .309 and led the league in both home runs (31) and RBI (114). Pickering received his first call-up to the Majors on September 7, 1998.

In a five-season Major League career, Pickering hit .223 with 14 home runs and 45 RBIs in 95 games played.

He has also played in Mexico with the Cañeros de Los Mochis (2002–2003) and in Korean baseball with the SK Wyverns (2006).

Following surgery in the 2006–07 offseason, Pickering signed with the Kansas City T-Bones of the independent Northern League and played the 2007 season there. He batted .310 with 18 home runs and 83 RBI in 89 games.

In 2008, Pickering signed with the Bridgeport Bluefish of the independent Atlantic League, but was released on July 13 after batting only .265. He then signed with the Schaumburg Flyers of the Northern League and hit .298 with 14 home runs in only 37 games.
