= London Tigers =

- 1989–1993; London, Ontario

Minor league affiliations
- Class: Double-A (1989–1993)
- League: Eastern League (1989–1993)

Major league affiliations
- Team: Detroit Tigers (1989–1993)

Minor league titles
- League titles (1): 1990

Team data
- Name: London Tigers (1989–1993)
- Colors: Midnight navy blue, orange, white
- Ballpark: Labatt Memorial Park (1989–1993)

The London Tigers were a professional Double-A Minor League Baseball team that played in the Eastern League from 1989 to 1993. They played at Labatt Memorial Park in London, Ontario, and were affiliated with the Detroit Tigers. At the time, it was the only EL and Double A franchise in Canada.

== History ==
=== First year and second year in London ===
After 47 years without a pro team, professional baseball returned to London in 1989 when the Glens Falls Tigers moved to the city and took on the name London Tigers.

Sitting on the Tigers' Board of Directors were President Dan Ross, Vice President Mike Tucker, Vice-President and General Manager Bob Gilson, Vice-President and Assistant General Manager General Manager Bill Wilkinson and Vice-President Brian Costello.

Sitting on the Tigers' Advisory Board were Brad Nelson, Bill MacDougall, London restaurant entrepreneur Mike Smith, Spencer Clark, Bruce Johnson and Tom Whealy.

The inaugural season homeopener for the Tigers was on Friday, April 7, 1989, against the Albany-Colonie Yankees.

During the team's inaugural season, the club derived its offence from unusual sources—shortstop and catcher. Shortstop Travis Fryman led the EL with 30 doubles, while hitting .265/.297/.402 and catcher Phil Clark batted .298/.328/.427.

Third baseman Scott Livingstone hit a team-high 14 HR but batted just .217.Paul Wenson went 2–3 with a 3.50 ERA one year after leading the EL in ERA while Darren Hursey (8-13, 3.97) led the league in losses, hits allowed (183) and runs allowed (92). The Tigers went 63-76 and finished 6th of 8 teams.

The London Tigers, managed by former New York Yankee star, Chris Chambliss drew 167,679 fans, more than they had their last two years in Glens Falls.

Chambliss was named Manager of the Year in the 1990 Eastern League after London finished 76–63, just three games behind the Albany-Colonie Yankees, while attendance was just 15 fans off the opening season's pace.

All-Star first baseman Rico Brogna was named the #3 prospect in the circuit and led the league in homers (21), and tied for the lead in RBI (77) while hitting .262/.331/.447. Mike Wilkins (13-5, 2.42), Dave Haas (13-8, 2.99) and Rusty Meacham (15-9, 3.13) gave the club a nice trio of arms; Wilkins was 6th in the league in ERA, Haas 9th and Meacham led in wins.

London hosted the Eastern League All-Star Game on June 25, 1990.

In the post-season, London lost the first two games to the Canton–Akron Indians but then won three in a row at home. They then beat the New Britain Red Sox in three straight games to become the first Detroit Tigers farm club to win the Eastern League championship.

=== Third year in London ===
Gene Roof managed the team to sixth place in 1991 with a 61–78 record as attendance slipped to 150,435.

Brogna was again named one of the top prospects in the loop (4th) though he spent some of the year in the International League while he hit .273/.330/.457; for the second straight year he hit as many doubles as homers for London. Steve Pegues hit .301 and Lou Frazier stole 42 bases and drew 77 walks. John Doherty (3-3, 15 Sv, 2.22) was the top pitcher on the squad.

=== Fourth year in London ===
Mark DeJohn managed London to a 67–70 record in 1992 as the team finished in fifth. Attendance dropped to 112,913, lowest in the EL.

The club's top position players were all repeats at AA. All-Star 1B Iván Cruz hit .273/.321/.407 in his second year with London; he drove in 104 to become the first EL player to top 100 since Mark Grace five years earlier. OF Frazier (in his 4th year at AA and third with London) hit .252/.376/.298 and led the circuit in walks (95), steals (58) and times caught stealing (23). Greg Sparks (in his 5th season at AA) hit .232/.331/.482 and topped the league with 25 homers; he was named to the All-Star team at DH. 3B Rob Reimink (.296/.393/.381 in his second year with London) was 4th in the league in average and Tyrone Kingwood (in his second AA season) (.284/.333/.385, 22 SB) also placed in the top 10 in average.

=== Fifth/final year in London ===
In 1993 with Tom Runnells as manager, the Tigers again drew the fewest fans, with 103,840, when Runnells led the team to a 63–75, 6th-place finish.

The team at least wasn't loaded with minor-league veterans—21-year-old OF Danny Bautista hit .285/.336/.382 and stole 28 bases; 23-year-old OF Rudy Pemberton posted a .276/.311/.435 line with 15 homers; 23-year-old 2B Shannon Penn (.260/.335/.310) led the league with 53 stolen bases and 22-year-old OF Bobby Higginson batted .308/.362/.464 after a call-up from the Lakeland Tigers. Felipe Lira went 10–4 with a 3.38 ERA, the third-best ERA in the league, and was the last London Tiger to make the EL All-Star team. José Lima went 8-13 with a 4.07 ERA.

After the 1993 campaign, the Tigers, frustrated with sinking attendance, moved the team to Trenton, New Jersey where they became the Trenton Thunder. After one year in Trenton, the Thunder switched affiliation from Detroit to the Boston Red Sox, Trenton Thunder Baseball are now members of the collegiate summer baseball MLB Draft League.

== Season-by-season results ==
Season	Affiliation	Manager	Record
1989	Tigers	Chris Chambliss	63–76, 6th place league
1990	Tigers	Chris Chambliss	76–63, 2nd place league
1991	Tigers	Johnny Lipon	61-78, 6th place league
1992	Tigers	Mark DeJohn	67–70, 5th place league
1993	Tigers	Tom Runnells	63-75, 6th place league

=== Playoff appearances ===
- 1990 season: Defeated Canton-Akron 3–2 in semifinals; defeated New Britain 3–2 in championship series
