= Springfield Giants =

From 1957 through 1965, the Springfield Giants were the Single-A and Double-A baseball team affiliate of the New York/San Francisco Giants in the Eastern League. The team played at Pynchon Park in Springfield, Massachusetts.

The Springfield Giants won three consecutive championships in 1959, 1960 (co-champs) and 1961 under manager Andy Gilbert, all leading the way to San Francisco's National League pennant in 1962.

Springfield Giants players with major-league experience include:

- Felipe Alou
- Matty Alou
- Bob Barton
- Ernie Bowman
- Tom Haller
- Bill Hands
- Jim Ray Hart
- Rick Joseph
- Hal Lanier
- Frank Linzy
- Juan Marichal
- Manny Mota
- José Pagán
- Al Stanek

== Sources ==
- Eastern League Baseball
- The Encyclopedia of Minor League Baseball, Lloyd Johnson and Miles Wolff, ed., 1997 edition. Durham, North Carolina: Baseball America.
