= Williamsport Bills =

- 1987–1991; Williamsport, Pennsylvania
Team logo
Cap insignia

Minor league affiliations
- Previous classes: Double-A
- League: Eastern League (1987–1991)

Major league affiliations
- Previous teams: New York Mets (1991); Seattle Mariners (1989–1990); Cleveland Indians (1987–1988)

Team data
- Colors: Blue, orange, white (1991); Blue, gold, white (1989-1990); Navy blue, red, white (1987-1988)
- Previous parks: Bowman Field

The Williamsport Bills were a Class AA Eastern League baseball affiliate of the Cleveland Indians, Seattle Mariners, and New York Mets from 1987 to 1991 in Williamsport, Pennsylvania, in the United States. They played their games in Bowman Field, which is currently home to the Williamsport Crosscutters, a charter member of the MLB Draft League.

The Bills began playing in 1987 as the AA affiliate of the Cleveland Indians, became an affiliate of the Seattle Mariners in 1989, and played their final season in 1991 as part of the New York Mets organization. Over their five-season history, the Bills did not win an Eastern League championship. Notable former Bills players and managers include Pittsburgh Pirates manager Clint Hurdle, who would go on to manage the Colorado Rockies in the 2007 World Series, Mike Hargrove, who managed the Cleveland Indians in the World Series in 1995 and 1997, Turner Gill, former Nebraska quarterback and former head football coach of the Buffalo Bulls and Kansas Jayhawks, two-time All-Star Tino Martinez, and Dave Bresnahan who was ejected from a game for throwing a potato into left field during a faked pick-off of a runner at third base.

== Indians farm team ==
The Bills were the AA farm team of the Cleveland Indians for two seasons. The franchise began play in 1987, having moved from Waterbury, Connecticut, to Williamsport. The two seasons under the leadership of managers Steve Swisher, Orlando Gomez, and Mike Hargrove, were largely unsuccessful, with the team finishing in seventh (1987) and sixth place (1988) in an eight-team league. Future major leaguers Jeff Shaw, Tom Lampkin, and Bernardo Brito were part of the teams during the two years that the Williamsport Bills were affiliated with the Cleveland Indians.

=== The potato incident ===
The franchise's most notable game took place in 1987. Dave Bresnahan was catching for the Bills, who were in seventh place in an eight-team league, playing the last-place Reading Phillies in late-August game. With a runner on third base, Bresnahan switched catcher's mitts and put on a glove in which he had secreted a shaved-down potato. When the pitch came in, Bresnahan fired the white potato down the third-base line, enticing the runner to sprint home. Bresnahan then tagged the runner with the baseball, prompting the umpire to award the runner home plate for Bresnahan's deception, contrary to how Bresnahan was told by an umpire friend that they would just send the runner back to third base and eject him from the game.

The president of the Eastern League took offense to what he perceived as Bresnahan's affront to the game, banning the grandnephew of Hall of Famer Roger Bresnahan from the league. However, the citizens of Williamsport applauded Bresnahan for his ingenuity, eventually prompting the club to retire his number 59. At the retirement ceremony in 1998, Bresnahan was quoted as saying, "Lou Gehrig had to play in 2,130 consecutive games and hit .340 for his number to be retired, and all I had to do was bat .140 and throw a potato."

== Mariners farm team ==
The Williamsport Bills became a farm team of the Seattle Mariners during the 1989 and 1990 seasons after the franchise was moved to Hagerstown, Maryland, becoming the Hagerstown Suns and the Pittsfield, Massachusetts, Pittsfield Cubs were quickly moved to Williamsport to take its place. The team finished in seventh place both years under the leadership of Jay Ward and Rich Morales, respectively. Williamsport trailed the rest of the league in attendance numbers both years. They finished in last place by as many as 50,000 fans behind the next worst team in terms of attendance. Former major leaguers who played for the Bills during the Mariners years included Tino Martinez, Rich DeLucia and Mike Gardiner.

== Mets farm team ==
The 1991 season was the final season in the Eastern League for the Williamsport Bills. The franchise was purchased Maines Family in late 1990; they decided to move the franchise to Binghamton for 1992. The Bills played one last season at Bowman Field under the leadership of Clint Hurdle, and their attendance increased. Former Penn State Nittany Lion running back D. J. Dozier played outfield during his off-season from the NFL's Minnesota Vikings. Dozier made it to the majors during the 1992 season, playing for the Mets. Other future major leaguers to play for the Bills during their final season were Jeromy Burnitz and Tim Bogar.

== Year-by-year record ==
| Year | Record | Finish | Manager |
|---|---|---|---|
| 1987 | 60–79 | 7th | Steve Swisher / Orlando Gomez |
| 1988 | 66–73 | 6th | Mike Hargrove |
| 1989 | 63–77 | 7th | Jay Ward |
| 1990 | 61–79 | 7th | Rich Morales |
| 1991 | 60–79 | 7th | Clint Hurdle |
