= Albany–Colonie Yankees =

- 1983–1994; Colonie, New York

Minor league affiliations
- Class: Double-A (1983–1994)
- League: Eastern League (1983–1994)

Major league affiliations
- Team: New York Yankees (1985–1994); Oakland Athletics (1983–1984)

Minor league titles
- League titles (3): 1988; 1989; 1991
- Pennants (4): 1984; 1985; 1989; 1990

Team data
- Name: Albany–Colonie Yankees (1985–1994); Albany–Colonie A's (1984); Albany A's (1983)
- Mascot: Grounder (1985–1994)
- Ballpark: Heritage Park (1983–1994)

The Albany–Colonie Yankees were a Minor League Baseball team that played in the Double-A Eastern League from 1983 to 1994. They were located in Colonie, New York, and played their home games at Heritage Park. The team was known as the Albany A's in their inaugural 1983 season and the Albany–Colonie A's in 1984 after their Major League Baseball affiliate, the Oakland Athletics. They were renamed the Albany–Colonie Yankees in 1985 when they became an affiliate of the New York Yankees. The team retained the Yankees moniker through their final season in 1994.

For the first 11 years of Albany–Colonie's 12-year membership in the Eastern League, the circuit played without divisions. The top four teams qualified for the playoffs. The A's/Yankees qualified for the postseason on eight occasions, including four seasons by virtue of winning the regular season pennant (1984, 1985, 1989, and 1990). They won the Eastern League championship three times (1988, 1989, and 1991).

== Radio ==
- WABY 1400 AM: Albany (1987–1988 seasons)
- WGNA 1460 AM: Albany (1989–1991 seasons)
- WROW 590 AM: Albany (1992–1993 seasons)

== See also ==
- Former players (1985–1994)
- Former players (1983–1984)

Preceded by Waterbury A's	Oakland Athletics; Double-A affiliate 1980–1984	Succeeded by Huntsville Stars
Preceded by Nashville Sounds	New York Yankees; Double-A affiliate 1985–1994	Succeeded by Norwich Navigators
