= Eastern League (1938–present) =

American sports league in minor league baseball

- Current season, competition or edition: 2026 Eastern League season
- Formerly: New York–Pennsylvania League (1923–1937)
- Classification: Double-A (1963–present); Class A (1938–1962)
- Sport: Baseball
- Founded: 1923 (103 years ago)
- No. of teams: 12
- Country: United States
- Most recent champion: Reading Fightin Phils (2026; 5th title)
- Most titles: Binghamton Triplets (10)
- Website: milb.com

The Eastern League (EL) is a Minor League Baseball (MiLB) league that has operated under that name since 1938, with the exception of the 2021 season, during which the league operated under the moniker Double-A Northeast. The league has played at the Double-A level since 1963, and consists primarily of teams located in the Northeastern United States. Prior to 1963, the league operated at the Class A level.

== History ==
The league was founded in 1923 as the New York–Pennsylvania League. The first team outside the two original states was created in 1936 when the York White Roses of York, Pennsylvania, moved to Trenton, New Jersey, and were renamed the Trenton Senators. The league was renamed as the Eastern League in 1938 when the Scranton Miners of Scranton, Pennsylvania, moved to Hartford, Connecticut, and became the Hartford Bees.

The league has had teams in a total of 52 different cities, located in 12 different states and two Canadian provinces. The league consisted of six to eight teams from 1923 until 1993. The league expanded to 10 teams in 1994 with the addition of the Portland Sea Dogs and the New Haven Ravens and split into two divisions, the Northern Division and the Southern Division. The league expanded to 12 teams in 1999 with the addition of the Altoona Curve and the Erie SeaWolves. The two divisions were restructured and renamed for the 2010 season as the Eastern Division and the Western Division because the Connecticut Defenders moved to Richmond, Virginia, after the 2009 season, becoming the Richmond Flying Squirrels.

The start of the 2020 season was postponed due to the COVID-19 pandemic before ultimately being cancelled.

As part of Major League Baseball's 2021 reorganization of the minor leagues, the league was temporarily renamed the "Double-A Northeast"; the Somerset Patriots, formerly an independent team, joined the league, while the Trenton Thunder were relegated to the newly-formed MLB Draft League. Following MLB's acquisition of the rights to the names of the historical minor leagues, the Double-A Northeast was renamed the Eastern League effective with the 2022 season.

== Current teams ==
Division	Team	MLB affiliation	City	Stadium	Capacity
Northeast	Binghamton Rumble Ponies	New York Mets	Binghamton, New York	Mirabito Stadium	6,012
Northeast	Hartford Yard Goats	Colorado Rockies	Hartford, Connecticut	Dunkin' Park	6,121
Northeast	New Hampshire Fisher Cats	Toronto Blue Jays	Manchester, New Hampshire	Delta Dental Stadium	6,500
Northeast	Portland Sea Dogs	Boston Red Sox	Portland, Maine	Delta Dental Park at Hadlock Field	7,368
Northeast	Reading Fightin Phils	Philadelphia Phillies	Reading, Pennsylvania	FirstEnergy Stadium	9,000
Northeast	Somerset Patriots	New York Yankees	Bridgewater Township, New Jersey	TD Bank Ballpark	6,100
Southwest	Akron RubberDucks	Cleveland Guardians	Akron, Ohio	7 17 Credit Union Park	7,630
Southwest	Altoona Curve	Pittsburgh Pirates	Altoona, Pennsylvania	Peoples Natural Gas Field	7,210
Southwest	Chesapeake Baysox	Baltimore Orioles	Bowie, Maryland	Prince George's Stadium	10,000
Southwest	Erie SeaWolves	Detroit Tigers	Erie, Pennsylvania	UPMC Park	6,000
Southwest	Harrisburg Senators	Washington Nationals	Harrisburg, Pennsylvania	FNB Field	6,187
Southwest	Richmond Flying Squirrels	San Francisco Giants	Richmond, Virginia	CarMax Park	10,000

Northeast Division, Southwest Division

== Complete list of Eastern League teams (1923–present) ==
Notes: This list includes teams in predecessor New York–Pennsylvania League of 1923 to 1937.

Bold font indicates an active Eastern League team.

A "^" indicates that team's article redirects to an article of an active team formerly of the Eastern League.

A "†" indicates that team's article redirects to an article of a defunct Eastern League team.

- Akron Aeros^
- **Akron RubberDucks**
- Albany Senators
- Albany-Colonie A's
- Albany-Colonie Yankees
- Allentown Brooks
- Allentown Cardinals
- Allentown Red Sox
- **Altoona Curve**
- Berkshire Brewers
- **Binghamton Rumble Ponies**
- Binghamton Triplets
- Bowie Baysox
- Bristol Red Sox
- Buffalo Bisons
- Canton–Akron Indians
- Charleston Indians
- **Chesapeake Baysox**
- Connecticut Defenders
- Elmira Colonels
- Elmira Pioneers
- Elmira Red Jackets
- Elmira Red Wings
- Elmira Royals
- **Erie SeaWolves**
- Glens Falls Tigers
- Glens Falls White Sox
- Hagerstown Suns
- **Harrisburg Senators**
- Hartford Bees†
- Hartford Chiefs
- Hartford Laurels
- **Hartford Yard Goats**
- Hazleton Red Sox
- Holyoke Millers
- Jersey City A's
- Jersey City Indians
- Johnstown Johnnies
- Johnstown Red Sox
- Lancaster Red Roses
- London Tigers
- Lynn Pirates
- Lynn Sailors
- Manchester Yankees
- Nashua Angels
- Nashua Pirates
- New Britain Red Sox†
- New Britain Rock Cats
- **New Hampshire Fisher Cats**
- New Haven Ravens^
- Norwich Navigators
- Pawtucket Indians
- Pawtucket Red Sox
- Pittsfield Cubs
- Pittsfield Rangers
- Pittsfield Red Sox
- Pittsfield Senators
- **Portland Sea Dogs**
- Québec Carnavals (also as Québec Metros)
- **Reading Fightin Phils**
- Reading Indians^
- Reading Phillies^
- Reading Red Sox
- **Richmond Flying Squirrels**
- Schenectady Blue Jays
- Scranton Miners
- Scranton Red Sox
- Shamokin Indians
- Sherbrooke Pirates
- **Somerset Patriots**
- Springfield Giants
- Springfield Nationals
- Springfield Rifles
- Syracuse Chiefs
- Syracuse/Allentown Chiefs
- Syracuse Stars
- Thetford Mines Miners
- Thetford Mines Pirates
- Trenton Senators
- Trenton Thunder
- Trois-Rivières Aigles
- Utica Blue Sox
- Utica Braves
- Utica Indians/Oneonta Indians
- Vermont Mariners
- Vermont Reds
- Waterbury A's
- Waterbury Angels
- Waterbury Dodgers
- Waterbury Giants
- Waterbury Indians
- Waterbury Pirates
- Waterbury Reds
- West Haven A's
- West Haven White Caps
- West Haven Yankees
- Wilkes-Barre Barons
- Wilkes-Barre Indians
- Williamsport A's
- Williamsport Billies
- Williamsport Bills
- Williamsport Grays
- Williamsport Mets
- Williamsport Tomahawks
- Williamsport Tigers
- York Pirates
- York White Roses

== Champions ==
League champions have been determined by different means since the Eastern League's formation in 1923. Before 1934, the champions were simply the league pennant winners. A formal playoff system to determine league champions was established in 1934.

The Binghamton Triplets have won 10 championships, the most among all teams in the league, followed by the Elmira Colonels/Pioneers/Royals (8) and the Scranton Miners/Red Sox (7). Among active franchises, the Akron Aeros/RubberDucks and Harrisburg Senators have each won 6 championships, the most in the league, followed by the Reading Fightin Phils (5).

== Awards ==
- Eastern League Most Valuable Player Award
- Eastern League Pitcher of the Year Award
- Eastern League Top MLB Prospect Award (formerly the Eastern League Rookie of the Year Award)
- Eastern League Manager of the Year Award

== See also ==
- List of Eastern League stadiums
- Sports attendances
