= List of Eastern League stadiums =

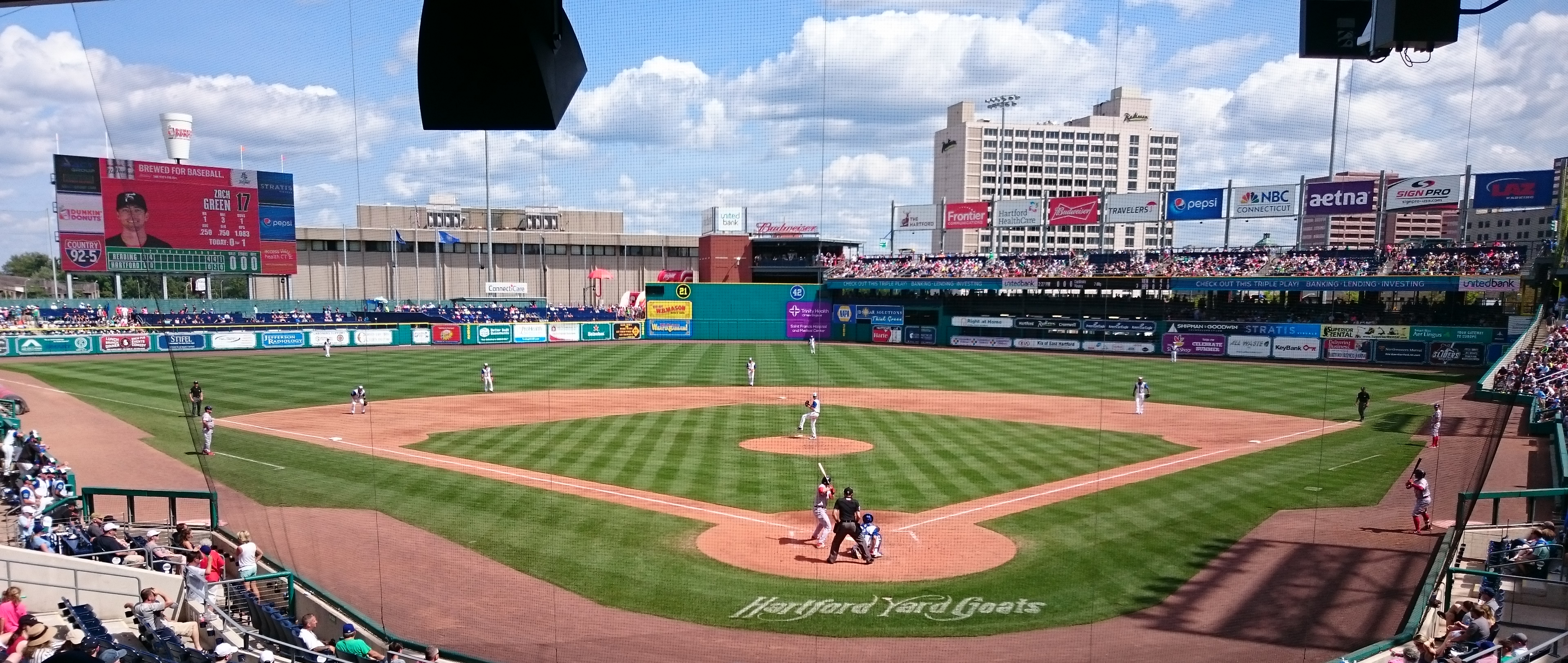
Dunkin' Park, home of the Hartford Yard Goats

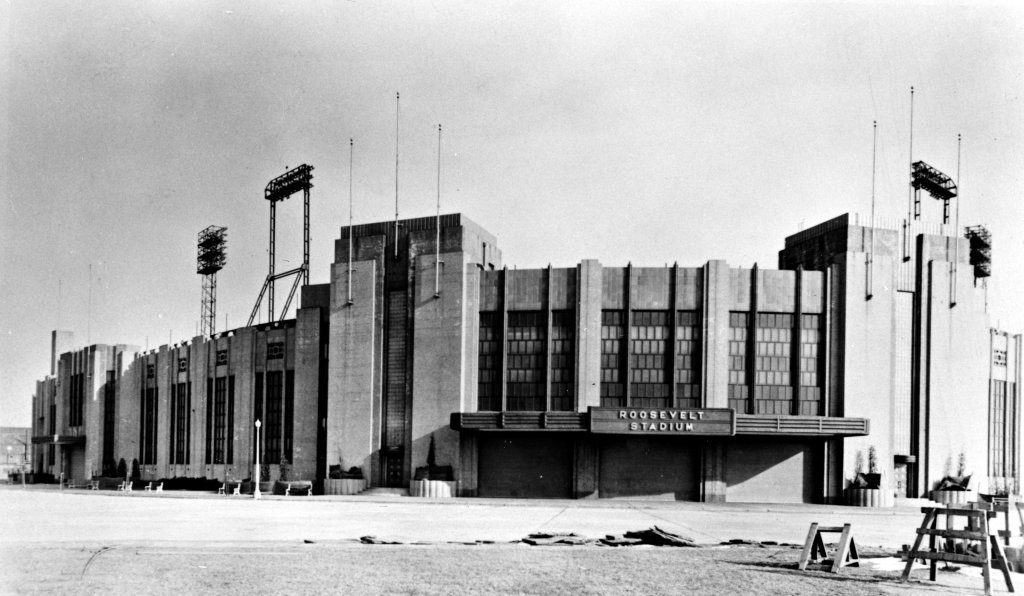
Roosevelt Stadium, home of the Jersey City Indians and Jersey City A's

There are 12 stadiums in use by Eastern League (EL) baseball teams. The oldest stadium is FirstEnergy Stadium (1951) in Reading, Pennsylvania, home of the Reading Fightin Phils. The newest stadium is CarMax Park (2026) in Richmond, Virginia, home of the Richmond Flying Squirrels. One stadium was built in each of the 1950s and 1980s, seven in the 1990s, and one in each of the 2000s, 2010s and 2020s. The highest seating capacity is 10,000 at Prince George's Stadium in Bowie, Maryland, where the Chesapeake Baysox play. The lowest capacity is 6,000 at UPMC Park in Erie, Pennsylvania, where the Erie SeaWolves play. All stadiums use a grass surface.

Since its founding, there have been approximately 70 stadiums located among over 50 municipalities used by the league, including the period when the EL was known as the New York–Pennsylvania League from 1923 to 1937. Of the stadiums with known opening dates, the oldest to have hosted EL games was Pynchon Park (1853), home of the Springfield Nationals, Springfield Rifles, and Springfield Giants; CarMax Park is also the newest of all stadiums to host EL games. The highest known seating capacity was 45,000 at War Memorial Stadium, the Buffalo Bisons home, though it was actually designed for football. The highest capacity of a stadium designed for baseball was 24,167 at Roosevelt Stadium, where the Jersey City Indians and Jersey City A's played their home games. The stadium with the lowest known capacity was Bleecker Stadium, home of the Albany-Colonie A's, which seated only 2,000.

== Active stadiums ==
Name	Team	City	State	Opened	Capacity	Ref.
7 17 Credit Union Park	Akron RubberDucks	Akron	Ohio	1997	7,630	
CarMax Park	Richmond Flying Squirrels	Richmond	Virginia	2026	10,000	
Dunkin' Park	Hartford Yard Goats	Hartford	Connecticut	2017	6,121	
FirstEnergy Stadium	Reading Fightin Phils	Reading	Pennsylvania	1951	9,000	
FNB Field	Harrisburg Senators	Harrisburg	Pennsylvania	1987	6,187	
Delta Dental Park at Hadlock Field	Portland Sea Dogs	Portland	Maine	1994	7,368	
Mirabito Stadium	Binghamton Rumble Ponies	Binghamton	New York	1992	6,012	
Delta Dental Stadium	New Hampshire Fisher Cats	Manchester	New Hampshire	2005	6,500	
Peoples Natural Gas Field	Altoona Curve	Altoona	Pennsylvania	1999	7,210	
Prince George's Stadium	Chesapeake Baysox	Bowie	Maryland	1994	10,000	
TD Bank Ballpark	Somerset Patriots	Bridgewater	New Jersey	1999	6,100	
UPMC Park	Erie SeaWolves	Erie	Pennsylvania	1995	6,000	

=== Map ===
Current stadium locations:
- Northeast Division
- Southwest Division

=== Gallery ===
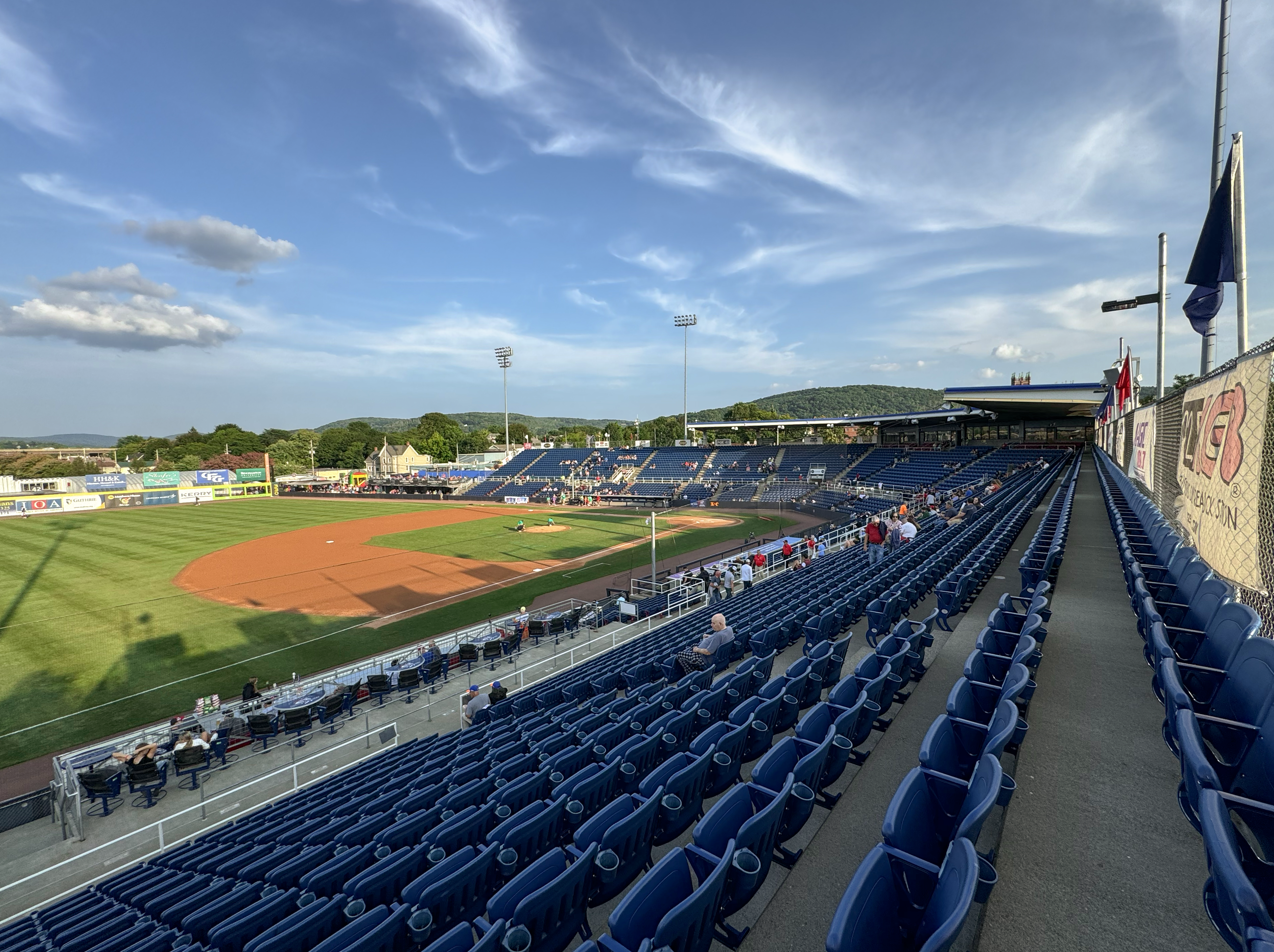
Mirabito Stadium (Binghamton Rumble Ponies)

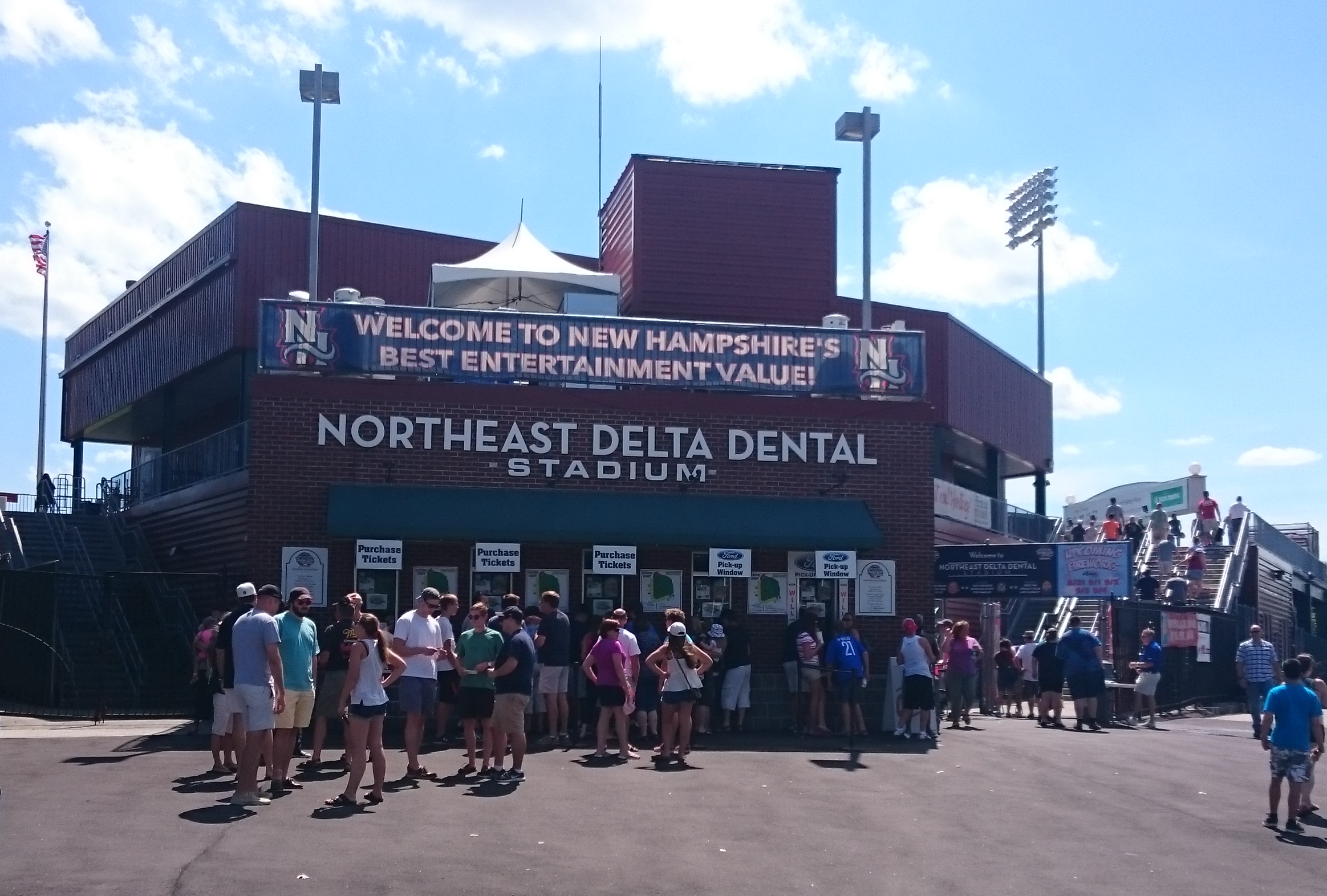
Delta Dental Stadium (New Hampshire Fisher Cats)

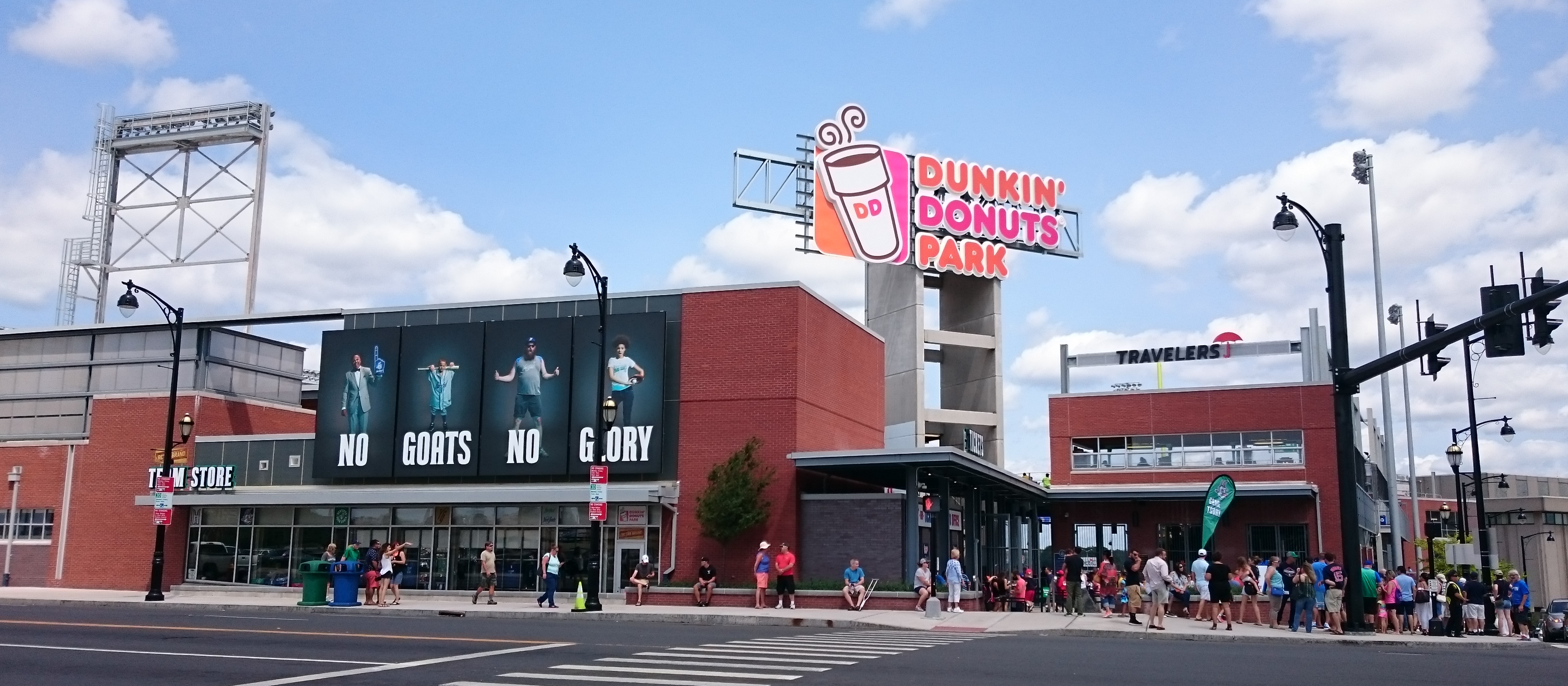
Dunkin' Park (Hartford Yard Goats)

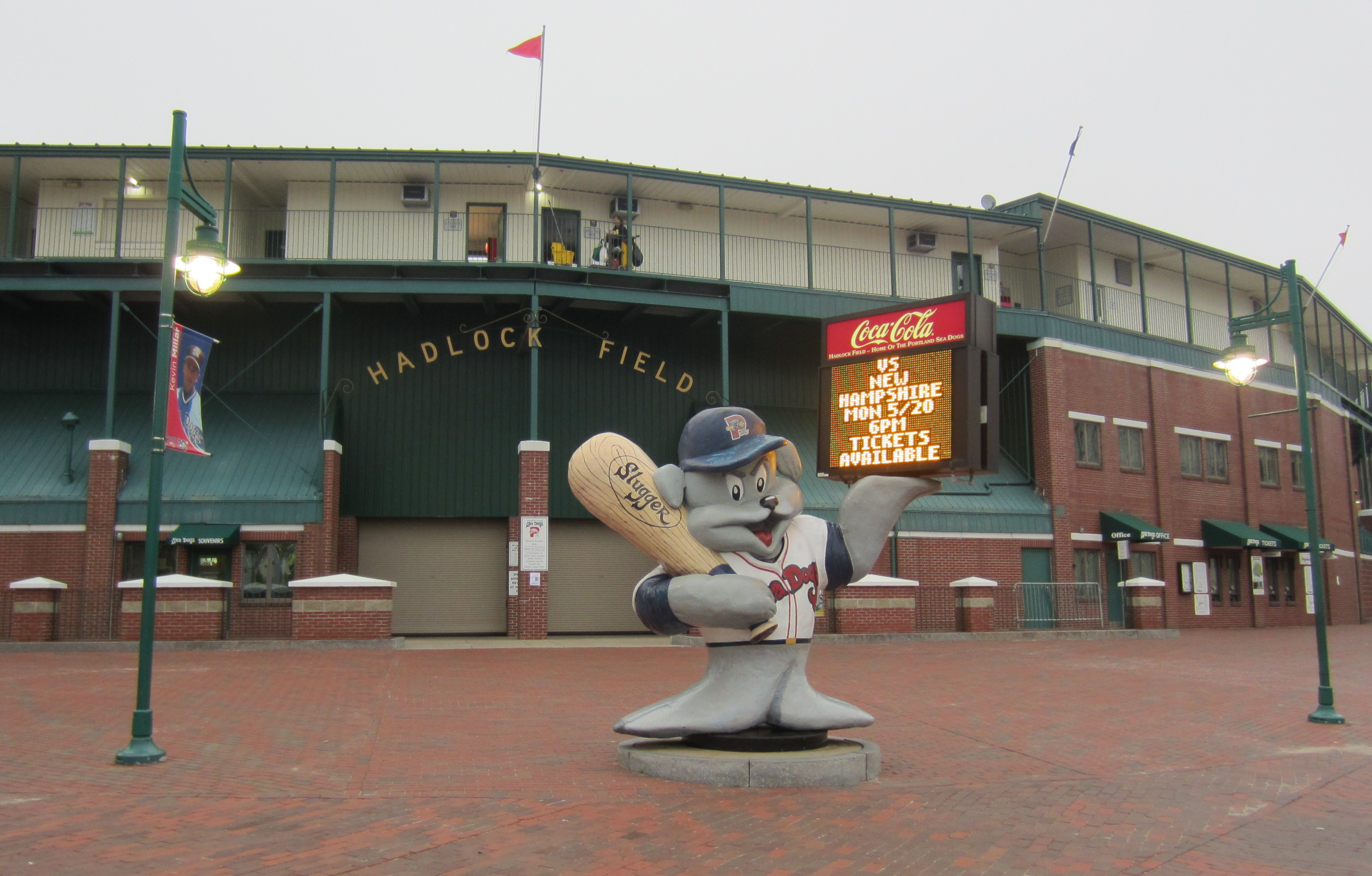
Hadlock Field (Portland Sea Dogs)

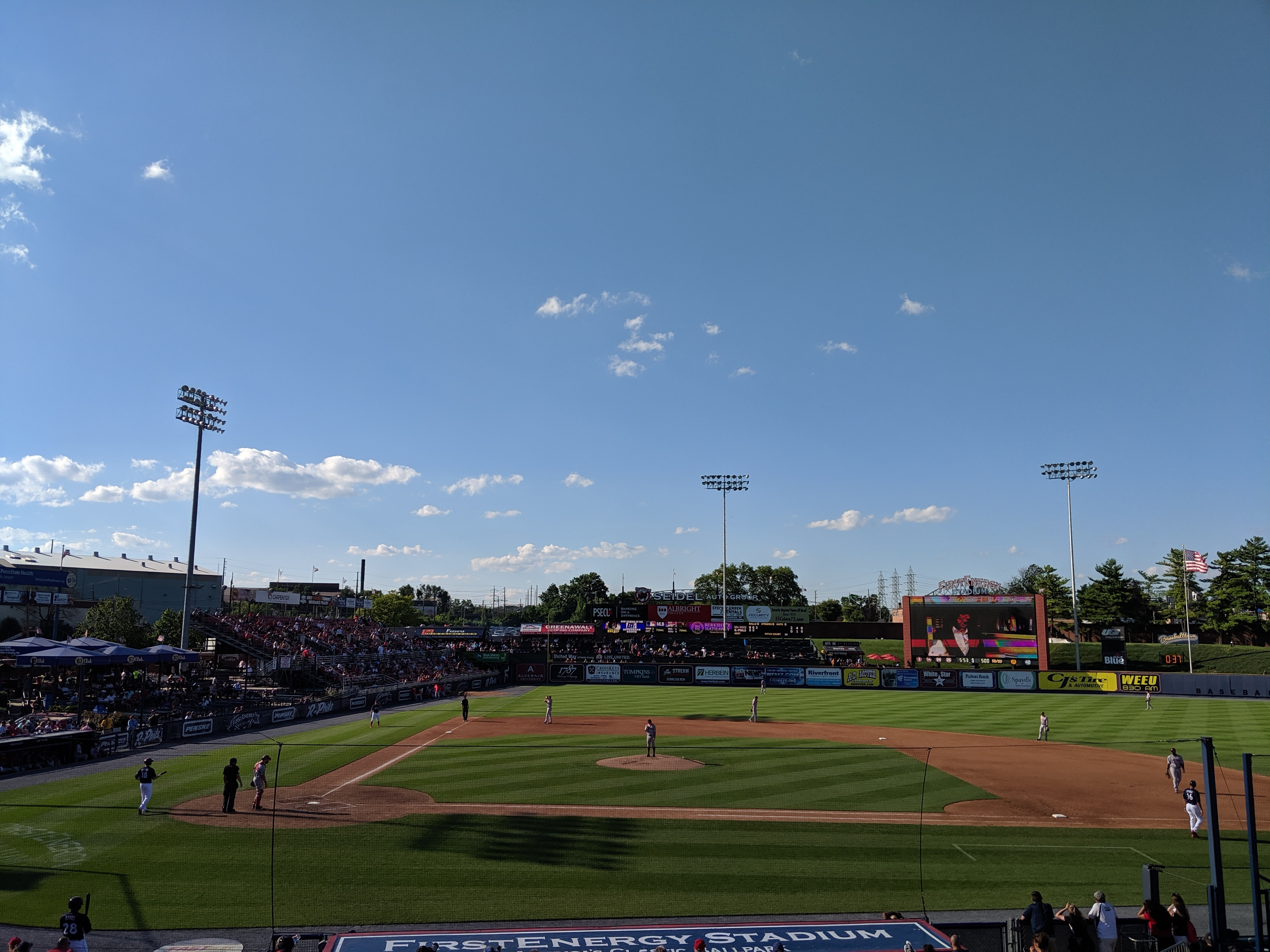
FirstEnergy Stadium (Reading Fightin Phils)

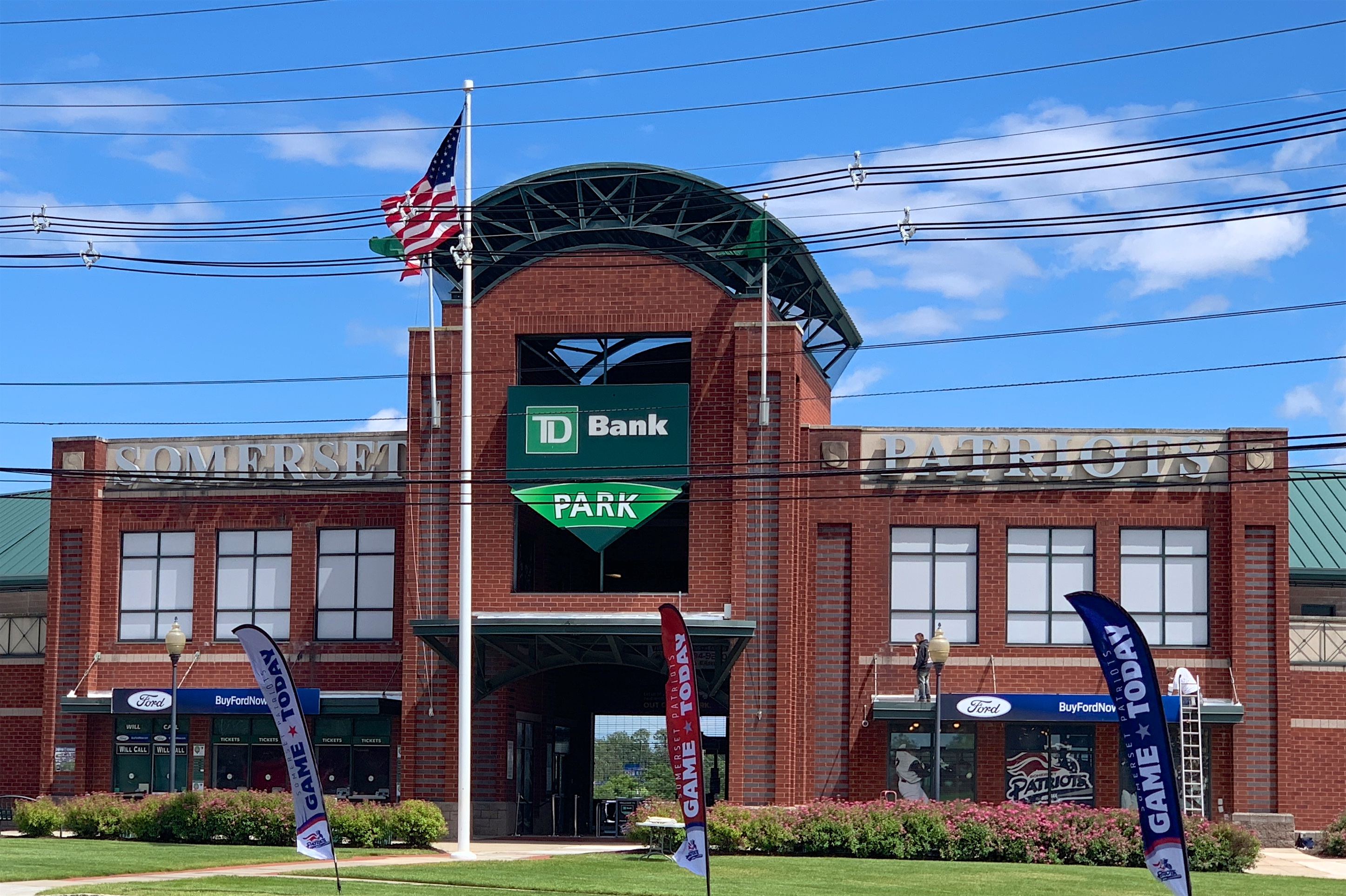
TD Bank Ballpark (Somerset Patriots)

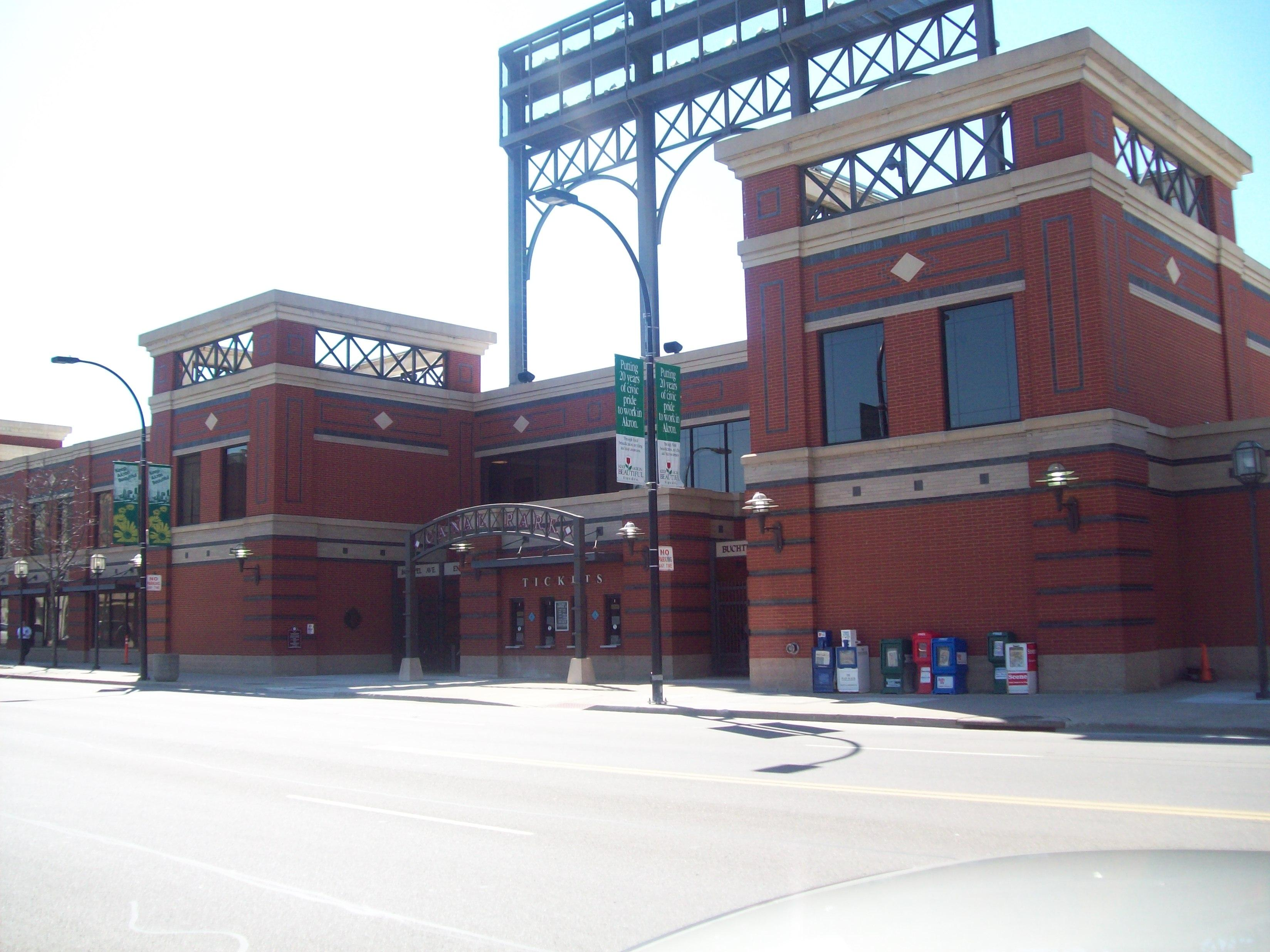
7 17 Credit Union Park (Akron RubberDucks)

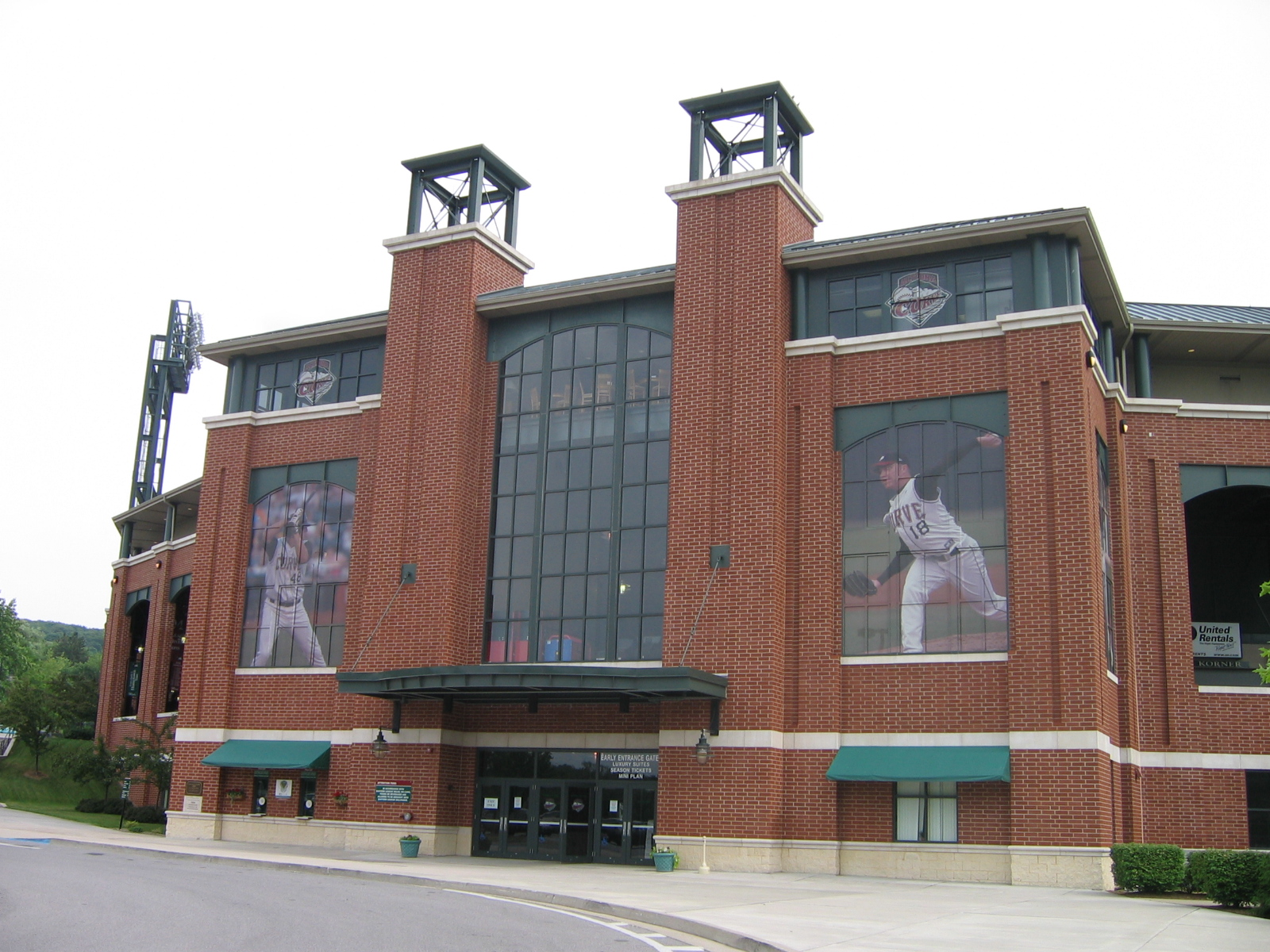
Peoples Natural Gas Field (Altoona Curve)

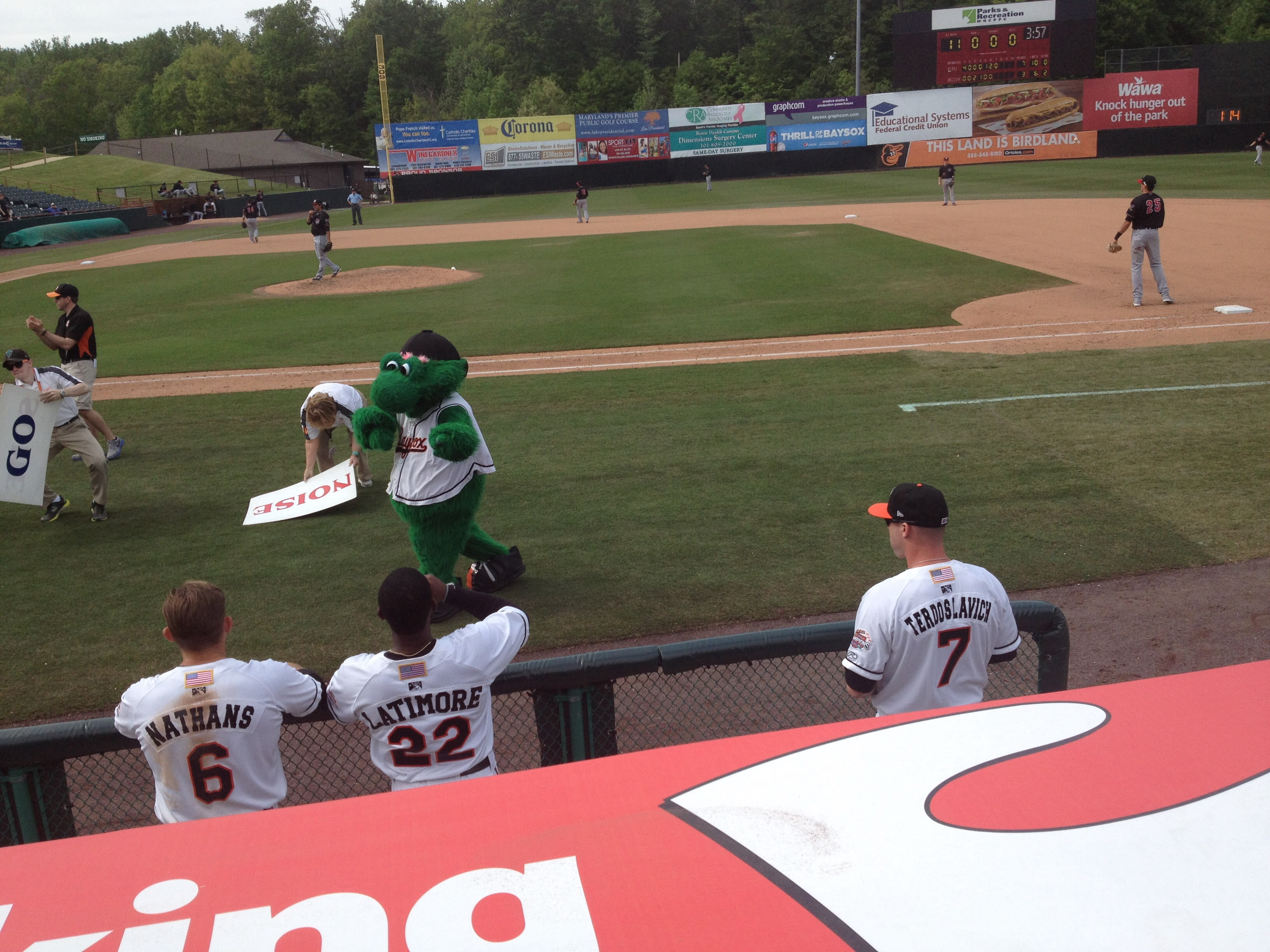
Prince George's Stadium (Chesapeake Baysox)

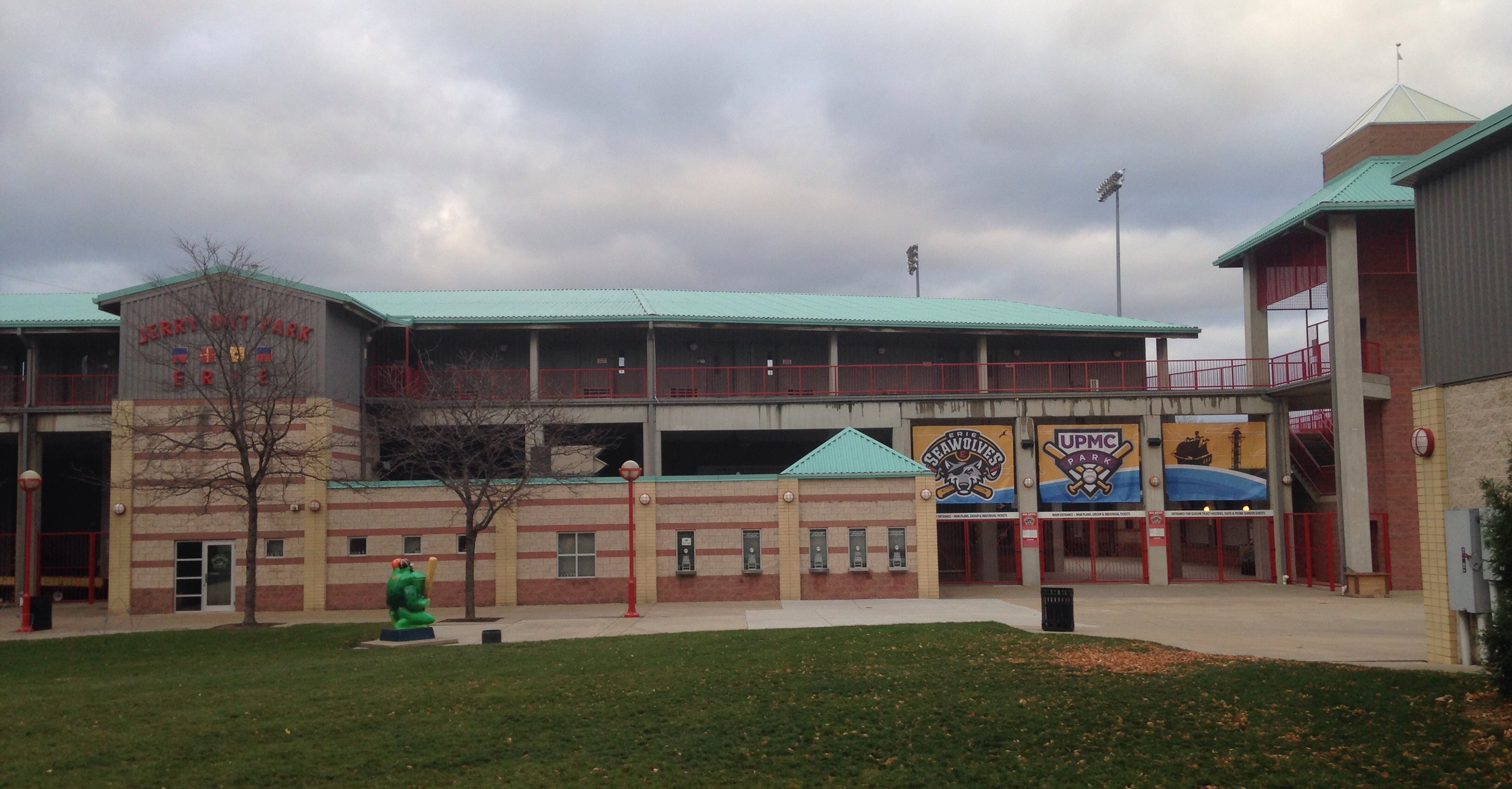
UPMC Park (Erie SeaWolves)

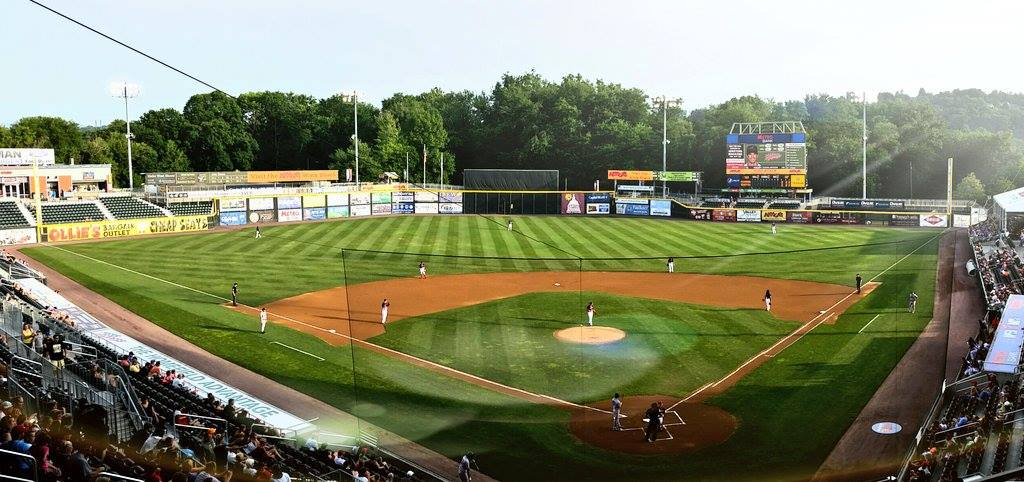
FNB Field (Harrisburg Senators)

== All stadiums ==
Key
Name	Stadium's name in its most recent season of hosting EL baseball
Opened	Opening of earliest stadium variant used for hosting EL baseball
Capacity	Stadium's most recent capacity while hosting EL baseball

Name	Team(s)	Location	State Province	Opened	Capacity	Ref
7 17 Credit Union Park (Note: 7 17 Credit Union Park was previously called Canal Park.)	Akron Aeros/RubberDucks	Akron	Ohio	1997	7,630	
Ambrose McConnell Field (Note: Ambrose McConnell Field was also known as Braves Field (1939–1942).)	Utica Braves/Blue Sox	Utica	New York		5,500	
Amedée Roy Stadium (Note: Amedée Roy Stadium was also known as Municipal Stadium and Park Avenue Stadium.)	Sherbrooke Pirates	Sherbrooke	Quebec	1952	5,200	
Arm & Hammer Park (Note: Arm & Hammer Park was named Mercer County Waterfront Park (1994–2012).) (Note: Arm & Hammer Park's playing surface is named Samuel J. Plumeri, Sr. Field.)	Trenton Thunder	Trenton	New Jersey	1994	6,341	
Artillery Park (Note: Artillery Park is now called George Ralston Field.)	Wilkes-Barre Barons/Indians	Wilkes-Barre	Pennsylvania	1923	4,000	
Beehive Field	New Britain Red Sox, Hardware City Rock Cats	New Britain	Connecticut	1983	4,700	
Bellevue Park (Note: Bellevue Park was also known as Stade des Pirates.)	Thetford Mines Pirates/Miners	Thetford Mines	Quebec		2,400	
Bleecker Stadium	Albany-Colonie A's	Albany	New York	1930	2,000	
Bowman Field (Note: Bowman Field was also known as Municipal Athletic Field (1924–1927) and Memorial Park (1928–1929).)	Williamsport Billies/Bills/Grays/Tigers/Athletics, Williamsport Mets, Williamsport Tomahawks, Williamsport Bills	Williamsport	Pennsylvania	1924	8,000	
Brooks Field (Note: Brooks Field was also known as Sweeney's Field and Athletic Park/Field.)	Scranton Miners/Red Sox (Note: Brooks Field was used by the Scranton Red Sox only while waiting for Scranton-Dunmore Stadium to be completed.)	Scranton	Pennsylvania	1894	9,000	
Buhler Stadium	Hazleton Mountaineers	Hazleton	Pennsylvania		5,000	
Bulkeley Stadium (Note: Bulkeley Stadium was named Clarkin Field (1921–1927).)	Hartford Bees/Laurels/Chiefs	Hartford	Connecticut	1921	7,000	
CarMax Park	Richmond Flying Squirrels	Richmond	Virginia	2026	10,000	
Centennial Field	Vermont Reds, Vermont Mariners	Burlington	Vermont	1922	4,000	
Cranberry Park	Hazleton Mountaineers/Red Sox	Hazleton	Pennsylvania		4,000	
Delta Dental Stadium (Note: Delta Dental Stadium opened as Fisher Cats Ballpark and was previously known as MerchantsAuto.com Stadium and Northeast Delta Dental Stadium.)	New Hampshire Fisher Cats	Manchester	New Hampshire	2005	6,500	
The Diamond	Richmond Flying Squirrels	Richmond	Virginia	1985	9,560	
Dickson City Park (Note: Dickson City Park was also known as Crystal Gardens Stadium.)	Scranton Miners	Scranton	Pennsylvania		7,500	
Dunkin' Park (Note: Dunkin' Park was originally called Dunkin' Donuts Park.)	Hartford Yard Goats	Hartford	Connecticut	2017	6,121	
Dunn Field	Elmira Pioneers/Royals	Elmira	New York	1939	7,200	
Dunn Field	Trenton Senators	Trenton	New Jersey		3,500	
Eagle Park	York White Roses	York	Pennsylvania		3,000	
East Field	Glens Falls White Sox, Glens Falls Tigers	Glens Falls	New York	1980	7,200	
Edgewood Park	Shamokin Shammies/Indians	Shamokin	Pennsylvania		3,000	
Fairgrounds Field (Note: Fairgrounds Field was renamed Fairview Field in 1939.)	Reading Keys/Allentown Brooks	Allentown	Pennsylvania	1929	10,000	
FirstEnergy Stadium (Note: FirstEnergy Stadium was known as Reading Municipal Stadium (1951–1989), Municipal Stadium (1990–1999), and GPU Stadium (2000–2002).)	Reading Indians, Reading Red Sox, Reading Phillies/Fightin Phils	Reading	Pennsylvania	1951	9,000	
FNB Field (Note: FNB Field was previously known as Riverside Stadium (1987–2004), Commerce Bank Park (2004–2009), and Metro Bank Park.)	Harrisburg Senators	Harrisburg	Pennsylvania	1987	6,187	
Fraser Field (Note: Fraser Field was known as Lynn Stadium (1946–1949).)	Lynn Sailors/Pirates	Lynn	Massachusetts	1938	5,000	
Gill Stadium (Note: Gill Stadium was known as Textile Field Athletic Grounds (1914–1934) and Manchester Athletic Field (1946–1949).)	Manchester Yankees, New Hampshire Fisher Cats	Manchester	New Hampshire	1913	4,000	
Delta Dental Park at Hadlock Field	Portland Sea Dogs	Portland	Maine	1994	7,368	
Hawkins Stadium	Albany Senators	Albany	New York	1928	8,300	
Heritage Park	Albany-Colonie A's/Yankees	Colonie	New York	1983	6,000	
Holman Stadium (Note: Holman Stadium was also known as Nokona Field at Holman Stadium.)	Nashua Angels/Pirates	Nashua	New Hampshire	1937	5,500	
Island Park (Note: Island Park was also known as Riverside Park.)	Harrisburg Senators	Harrisburg	Pennsylvania	1902	5,000	
Johnson Field	Binghamton Triplets	Binghamton	New York	1913	5,200	
Labatt Park (Note: Labatt Park was known as Tecumseh Park (1888–1924) and Queens Park (1925–1930).)	London Tigers	London	Ontario	1877	6,000	
Laurer Park	Reading Red Sox	Reading	Pennsylvania			
MacArthur Stadium (Note: MacArthur Stadium was also known as Municipal Stadium (1934–1941).)	Syracuse Chiefs	Syracuse	New York	1934	10,000	
MacKenzie Stadium (Note: MacKenzie Stadium was originally called Elmwood Park and known as Falco Field (1903–1913).)	Holyoke Millers	Holyoke	Massachusetts	1895	3,500	
Max Hess Stadium (Note: Max Hess Stadium was also known as Breadon Field (1948–1958).)	Allentown Cardinals, Allentown Chiefs, Allentown Red Sox	Allentown	Pennsylvania	1948	5,500	
McCoy Stadium	Pawtucket Indians, Pawtucket Red Sox	Pawtucket	Rhode Island	1942	6,000	
Memorial Stadium	Chesapeake Baysox	Baltimore	Maryland	1950	31,000	
Memorial Stadium (Note: Memorial Stadium is also called Bob Hoffman Stadium.)	York White Roses/Pirates	York	Pennsylvania	1947	5,000	
Mirabito Stadium (Note: Mirabito Stadium was previously known as Binghamton Municipal Park (1992–2002) and NYSEG Stadium.)	Binghamton Mets/Rumble Ponies	Binghamton	New York	1992	6,012	
Municipal Stadium	Hagerstown Suns	Hagerstown	Maryland	1930	4,600	
Municipal Stadium	Waterbury Giants/Indians/Pirates/Dodgers/A's/Reds/Angels	Waterbury	Connecticut	1938	5,000	
Muzzy Field	Bristol Red Sox	Bristol	Connecticut	1939	4,500	
Neahwa Park (Note: Neahwa Park was renamed Damaschke Stadium in 1968.)	Oneonta Indians	Oneonta	New York		3,000	
New Britain Stadium	Hardware City/New Britain Rock Cats	New Britain	Connecticut	1996	6,148	
Peoples Natural Gas Field (Note: Peoples Natural Gas Field was known as Altoona Ballpark (1999–2002) and Blair County Ballpark (2003–2011).)	Altoona Curve	Altoona	Pennsylvania	1999	7,210	
Point Stadium (Note: Point Stadium was known as Point Grounds (1905–1913).)	Johnstown Johnnies/Red Sox	Johnstown	Pennsylvania	1926	14,000	
Prince George's Stadium	Chesapeake/Bowie Baysox	Bowie	Maryland	1994	10,000	
Pynchon Park (Note: First two stadiums on the site of Pynchon Park were known as Hampden Park (1853–1908) and Hampden Park II (1908–1937).)	Springfield Nationals, Springfield Rifles, Springfield Giants	Springfield	Massachusetts	1853	4,500	
Quebec Municipal Stadium (Note: Quebec Municipal Stadium is also known as Le Stade.)	Québec Carnavals/Metros	Quebec City	Quebec	1938	6,500	
Quigley Stadium (Note: Quigley Stadium was formerly named Exhibition Stadium.)	West Haven Yankees/Whitecaps/A's	West Haven	Connecticut	1947	4,500	
Recreation Park II	Elmira Colonels/Red Birds/Red Wings/Pioneers	Elmira	New York			
Roosevelt Stadium	Jersey City Indians, Jersey City A's	Jersey City	New Jersey	1937	24,167	
Schenectady Stadium (Note: Schenectady Stadium was also known as McNearney Stadium (1946–1950).)	Schenectady Blue Jays	Schenectady	New York	1947	3,500	
Scranton-Dunmore Stadium	Scranton Miners/Red Sox	Scranton	Pennsylvania	1940	13,500	
Senator Thomas J. Dodd Memorial Stadium	Norwich Navigators, Connecticut Defenders, Hartford Yard Goats	Norwich	Connecticut	1995	6,275	
Stade Municipal de Trois-Rivières (Note: Stade Municipal de Trois-Rivières was renamed Stade Fernand-Bédard (2001), Stade Stéréo+ (2016), and Stade Quillorama (2019).)	Trois-Rivières Aigles	Trois-Rivières	Quebec	1938	4,500	
Star Park	Syracuse Stars	Syracuse	New York		5,500	
Stumpf Field	Lancaster Red Roses	Lancaster	Pennsylvania	1938	5,000	
TD Bank Ballpark (Note: TD Bank Ballpark was previously known as Somerset County Ballpark and Commerce Bank Ballpark.)	Somerset Patriots	Bridgewater	New Jersey	1999	6,100	
Thurman Munson Memorial Stadium	Canton–Akron Indians	Canton	Ohio	1989	5,760	
UPMC Park (Note: UPMC Park was previously known as Jerry Uht Park.)	Erie SeaWolves	Erie	Pennsylvania	1995	6,000	
Utica Athletic Field (Note: Utica Athletic Field was also known as Genesee Park.)	Utica Utes	Utica	New York		3,500	
Wahconah Park	Pittsfield Red Sox, Pittsfield Senators/Rangers, Berkshire Brewers, Pittsfield Cubs	Pittsfield	Massachusetts	1892	3,500	
War Memorial Stadium (Note: War Memorial Stadium's previous names were Civic Stadium (1961), Roesch Stadium, and Grover Cleveland Stadium.)	Buffalo Bisons	Buffalo	New York	1937	45,000	
Watt Powell Park (Note: Watt Powell Park was also known as Exhibition Park.)	Charleston Indians	Charleston	West Virginia	1948	5,500	
Yale Field	New Haven Ravens	New Haven	Connecticut	1927	5,000	

=== Map ===
Eastern League stadium locations

== See also ==
- List of Double-A baseball stadiums
- List of Southern League stadiums
- List of Texas League stadiums
- List of Eastern League teams
