= List of Eastern League teams =

The Eastern League has operated primarily in the Northeastern United States since 1923. It was known as the New York–Pennsylvania League from 1923 to 1937 and the Double-A Northeast in 2021. Over that 104-season span, its teams relocated, changed names, transferred to different leagues, or ceased operations altogether. This list documents teams which played in the league.

== Teams ==
Key
Team name (#)	A number following a team's name indicates multiple iterations of the team in chronological order.

Team	First season	Last season	Location	Fate
Akron Aeros	1997	2013	Akron, Ohio	Renamed the Akron RubberDucks
Akron RubberDucks	2014	—	Akron, Ohio	Active
Albany A's	1983	1983	Albany, New York	Renamed the Albany-Colonie A's
Albany Senators	1937	1959	Albany, New York	Folded
Albany-Colonie A's	1984	1984	Albany, New York	Renamed the Albany-Colonie Yankees
Albany-Colonie Yankees	1985	1994	Albany, New York	Relocated to Norwich, Connecticut, as the Norwich Navigators
Allentown Brooks	1935	1936	Allentown, Pennsylvania	Folded
Allentown Cardinals	1954	1956	Allentown, Pennsylvania	Folded
Allentown Chiefs	1957	1957	Allentown, Pennsylvania	Renamed the Allentown Red Sox
Allentown Red Sox	1958	1960	Allentown, Pennsylvania	Relocated to Johnstown, Pennsylvania, as the Johnstown Red Sox
Altoona Curve	1999	—	Altoona, Pennsylvania	Active
Berkshire Brewers	1976	1976	Pittsfield, Massachusetts	Folded
Binghamton Mets	1992	2016	Binghamton, New York	Renamed the Binghamton Rumble Ponies
Binghamton Rumble Ponies	2017	—	Binghamton, New York	Active
Binghamton Triplets (Note: The Binghamton Triplets were known as the Triple-Cities Triplets (1926–1929) also representing Endicott and Johnson City New York.) (1)	1923	1963	Binghamton, New York	Transferred to the New York–Penn League
Binghamton Triplets (2)	1967	1968	Binghamton, New York	Relocated to Manchester, New Hampshire, as the Manchester Yankees
Bowie Baysox	1993	2024	Bowie, Maryland	Renamed the Chesapeake Baysox
Bristol Red Sox	1973	1982	Bristol, Connecticut	Relocated to New Britain, Connecticut, as the New Britain Red Sox
Buffalo Bisons	1979	1984	Buffalo, New York	Transferred to the American Association
Canton–Akron Indians	1989	1996	Canton, Ohio	Relocated to Akron, Ohio, as the Akron Aeros
Charleston Indians	1962	1964	Charleston, West Virginia	Folded
Chesapeake Baysox	2025	—	Bowie, Maryland	Active
Connecticut Defenders	2006	2009	Norwich, Connecticut	Relocated to Richmond, Virginia, as the Richmond Flying Squirrels
Elmira Colonels (Note: The Elmira Colonels were known as the Elmira Red Wings from 1932 to 1934 and the Elmira Pioneers from 1935 to 1936.)	1924	1937	Elmira, New York	Renamed the Elmira Pioneers (1)
Elmira Pioneers (Note: The Elmira Pioneers were known as the Elmira Colonels in 1937.) (1)	1935	1955	Elmira, New York	Transferred to the New York–Penn League
Elmira Pioneers (Note: The Elmira Pioneers were known as the Elmira Royals in 1971.) (2)	1962	1972	Elmira, New York	Folded
Elmira Red Jackets	1923	1923	Elmira, New York	Renamed the Elmira Colonels
Elmira Red Wings	1932	1934	Elmira, New York	Renamed the Elmira Pioneers (1)
Elmira Royals	1971	1971	Elmira, New York	Renamed the Elmira Pioneers (2)
Erie SeaWolves	1999	—	Erie, Pennsylvania	Active
Glens Falls Tigers	1986	1988	Glens Falls, New York	Relocated to London, Ontario, as the London Tigers
Glens Falls White Sox	1980	1985	Glens Falls, New York	Renamed the Glens Falls Tigers
Hagerstown Suns	1989	1992	Hagerstown, Maryland	Relocated to Bowie, Maryland, as the Bowie Baysox
Hardware City Rock Cats	1995	1996	New Britain, Connecticut	Renamed the New Britain Rock Cats
Harrisburg Senators (1)	1924	1935	Harrisburg, Pennsylvania	Folded
Harrisburg Senators (2)	1987	—	Harrisburg, Pennsylvania	Active
Hartford Bees (Note: The Hartford Bees were known as the Hartford Laurels in 1944.)	1939	1946	Hartford, Connecticut	Renamed the Hartford Chiefs
Hartford Chiefs	1947	1952	Hartford, Connecticut	Folded
Hartford Laurels (Note: The Hartford Laurels were known as the Hartford Bees from 1939 to 1943.)	1938	1944	Hartford, Connecticut	Renamed the Hartford Bees
Hartford Yard Goats	2016	—	Hartford, Connecticut	Active
Hazleton Mountaineers (Note: The Hazleton Mountaineers were inactive for the 1933 season.)	1929	1936	Hazleton, Pennsylvania	Renamed the Hazleton Red Sox
Hazleton Red Sox	1937	1938	Hazleton, Pennsylvania	Transferred to the Interstate League
Holyoke Millers	1977	1982	Holyoke, Massachusetts	Relocated to Nashua, New Hampshire, as the Nashua Angels
Jersey City A's	1978	1978	Jersey City, New Jersey	Relocated to Waterbury, Connecticut, as the Waterbury A's
Jersey City Indians	1977	1977	Jersey City, New Jersey	Renamed the Jersey City A's
Johnstown Johnnies	1955	1956	Johnstown, Pennsylvania	Folded
Johnstown Red Sox	1961	1961	Johnstown, Pennsylvania	Folded
Lancaster Red Roses	1958	1961	Lancaster, Pennsylvania	Folded
London Tigers	1989	1993	London, Ontario	Relocated to Trenton, New Jersey, as the Trenton Thunder
Lynn Pirates	1983	1983	Lynn, Massachusetts	Relocated to Burlington, Vermont, as the Vermont Reds
Lynn Sailors	1980	1982	Lynn, Massachusetts	Renamed the Lynn Pirates
Manchester Yankees	1969	1971	Manchester, New Hampshire	Relocated to West Haven, Connecticut, as the West Haven Yankees
Nashua Angels	1983	1983	Nashua, New Hampshire	Renamed the Nashua Pirates
Nashua Pirates	1984	1986	Nashua, New Hampshire	Relocated to Harrisburg, Pennsylvania, as the Harrisburg Senators (2)
New Britain Red Sox	1983	1994	New Britain, Connecticut	Renamed the Hardware City Rock Cats
New Britain Rock Cats	1997	2015	New Britain, Connecticut	Relocated to Hartford, Connecticut, as the Hartford Yard Goats
New Hampshire Fisher Cats	2004	—	Manchester, New Hampshire	Active
New Haven Ravens	1994	2003	New Haven, Connecticut	Relocated to Manchester, New Hampshire, as the New Hampshire Fisher Cats
Norwich Navigators	1995	2005	Norwich, Connecticut	Renamed the Connecticut Defenders
Oneonta Indians	1924	1924	Oneonta, New York	Folded
Pawtucket Indians	1966	1967	Pawtucket, Rhode Island	Folded
Pawtucket Red Sox	1970	1972	Pawtucket, Rhode Island	Relocated to Bristol, Connecticut, as the Bristol Red Sox
Pittsfield Cubs	1985	1988	Pittsfield, Massachusetts	Relocated to Williamsport, Pennsylvania, as the Williamsport Bills (2)
Pittsfield Rangers	1972	1975	Pittsfield, Massachusetts	Renamed the Berkshire Brewers
Pittsfield Red Sox	1965	1969	Pittsfield, Massachusetts	Renamed the Pittsfield Senators
Pittsfield Senators	1970	1971	Pittsfield, Massachusetts	Renamed the Pittsfield Rangers
Portland Sea Dogs	1994	—	Portland, Maine	Active
Québec Carnavals	1971	1975	Quebec City, Quebec	Renamed the Québec Metros
Québec Metros	1976	1977	Quebec City, Quebec	Relocated to Memphis, Tennessee, as the Memphis Chicks of the Southern League
Reading Brooks	1935	1935	Reading, Pennsylvania	Relocated to Allentown, Pennsylvania, as the Allentown Brooks on July 9
Reading Fightin Phils	2013	—	Reading, Pennsylvania	Active
Reading Indians (1)	1952	1961	Reading, Pennsylvania	Relocated to Charleston, West Virginia, as the Charleston Indians
Reading Indians (2)	1965	1965	Reading, Pennsylvania	Relocated to Pawtucket, Rhode Island, as the Pawtucket Indians
Reading Phillies	1967	2012	Reading, Pennsylvania	Renamed the Reading Fightin Phils
Reading Red Sox (1)	1933	1934	Reading, Pennsylvania	Folded
Reading Red Sox (2)	1963	1964	Reading, Pennsylvania	Relocated to Pittsfield, Massachusetts, as the Pittsfield Red Sox
Richmond Flying Squirrels	2010	—	Richmond, Virginia	Active
Schenectady Blue Jays	1951	1957	Schenectady, New York	Folded
Scranton Miners (1)	1923	1937	Scranton, Pennsylvania	Folded
Scranton Miners (Note: The Scranton Miners were known as the Scranton Red Sox from 1946 to 1951.) (2)	1944	1953	Scranton, Pennsylvania	Folded
Scranton Red Sox (Note: The Scranton Red Sox were known as the Scranton Miners from 1944 to 1945.)	1939	1951	Scranton, Pennsylvania	Renamed the Scranton Miners (2)
Shamokin Indians	1926	1927	Shamokin, Pennsylvania	Transferred to the Anthracite League
Shamokin Shammies	1925	1925	Shamokin, Pennsylvania	Renamed the Shamokin Indians
Sherbrooke Pirates	1972	1973	Sherbrooke, Quebec	Relocated to Thetford Mines, Quebec, as the Thetford Mines Pirates
Somerset Patriots	2021	—	Bridgewater Township, New Jersey	Active
Springfield Giants	1957	1965	Springfield, Massachusetts	Folded
Springfield Nationals	1939	1941	Springfield, Massachusetts	Renamed the Springfield Rifles
Springfield Rifles	1942	1943	Springfield, Massachusetts	Folded
Syracuse Chiefs	1956	1957	Syracuse, New York	Relocated to Allentown, Pennsylvania, as the Allentown Chiefs on July 13
Syracuse Stars	1928	1929	Syracuse, New York	Relocated to Hazleton, Pennsylvania, as the Hazleton Mountaineers on June 16
Thetford Mines Miners	1975	1975	Thetford Mines, Quebec	Relocated to Williamsport, Pennsylvania, as the Williamsport Tomahawks
Thetford Mines Pirates	1974	1974	Thetford Mines, Quebec	Renamed the Thetford Mines Miners
Trenton Senators	1936	1938	Trenton, New Jersey	Transferred to the Interstate League
Trenton Thunder	1994	2020 (Note: The Trenton Thunder last played in the league during the 2019 season, since the 2020 season was cancelled due to the COVID-19 pandemic.)	Trenton, New Jersey	Transferred to the MLB Draft League
Trois-Rivières Aigles	1971	1977	Trois-Rivières, Quebec	Relocated to Nashville, Tennessee, as the Nashville Sounds of the Southern League
Utica Blue Sox	1944	1950	Utica, New York	Folded
Utica Braves	1943	1943	Utica, New York	Renamed the Utica Blue Sox
Utica Utes	1924	1924	Utica, New York	Relocated to Oneonta, New York, as the Oneonta Indians on August 7
Vermont Mariners	1988	1988	Burlington, Vermont	Relocated to Canton, Ohio, as the Canton–Akron Indians
Vermont Reds	1984	1987	Burlington, Vermont	Renamed the Vermont Mariners
Waterbury Angels	1984	1984	Waterbury, Connecticut	Renamed the Waterbury Indians (2)
Waterbury A's	1979	1979	Waterbury, Connecticut	Renamed the Waterbury Reds
Waterbury Dodgers	1973	1976	Waterbury, Connecticut	Renamed the Waterbury Giants (2)
Waterbury Giants (1)	1966	1967	Waterbury, Connecticut	Renamed the Waterbury Indians (1)
Waterbury Giants (2)	1977	1978	Waterbury, Connecticut	Folded
Waterbury Indians (1)	1968	1969	Waterbury, Connecticut	Renamed the Waterbury Pirates
Waterbury Indians (2)	1985	1986	Waterbury, Connecticut	Folded
Waterbury Pirates	1970	1971	Waterbury, Connecticut	Folded
Waterbury Reds	1980	1983	Waterbury, Connecticut	Renamed the Waterbury Angels
West Haven A's	1981	1982	West Haven, Connecticut	Relocated to Albany, New York, as the Albany A's
West Haven Whitecaps	1980	1980	West Haven, Connecticut	Renamed the West Haven A's
West Haven Yankees	1972	1979	West Haven, Connecticut	Renamed the West Haven Whitecaps
Wilkes–Barre Barons (Note: The Wilkes–Barre Barons were known as the Wilkes-Barre Indians from 1949 to 1951 and inactive in 1952.)	1923	1955	Wilkes-Barre, Pennsylvania	Relocated to Johnstown, Pennsylvania, as the Johnstown Johnnies on July 1
Wilkes-Barre Indians	1949	1951	Wilkes-Barre, Pennsylvania	Renamed the Wilkes–Barre Barons
Williamsport A's	1953	1953	Williamsport, Pennsylvania	Renamed the Williamsport Grays
Williamsport Billies	1923	1923	Williamsport, Pennsylvania	Renamed the Williamsport Grays
Williamsport Bills (1)	1987	1988	Williamsport, Pennsylvania	Relocated to Hagerstown, Maryland, as the Hagerstown Suns
Williamsport Bills (2)	1989	1991	Williamsport, Pennsylvania	Relocated to Binghamton, New York, as the Binghamton Mets
Williamsport Grays (Note: The Williamsport Grays were inactive for the 1943 and 1957 seasons, known as the Williamsport Tigers from 1947 to 1949 and 1951 to 1952, and known as the Williamsport A's for the 1953 season.)	1924	1962	Williamsport, Pennsylvania	Folded
Williamsport Mets	1964	1967	Williamsport, Pennsylvania	Renamed the Williamsport Astros of the New York–Penn League
Williamsport Tigers (Note: The Williamsport Tigers were known as the Williamsport Grays for the 1950 season.)	1947	1952	Williamsport, Pennsylvania	Renamed the Williamsport A's
Williamsport Tomahawks	1976	1976	Williamsport, Pennsylvania	Relocated to Jersey City, New Jersey, as the Jersey City Indians
York Pirates	1968	1969	York, Pennsylvania	Folded
York White Roses (1)	1923	1933	York, Pennsylvania	Folded
York White Roses (2)	1936	1936	York, Pennsylvania	Relocated to Trenton, New Jersey, as the Trenton Senators on July 2
York White Roses (3)	1958	1959	York, Pennsylvania	Folded
York White Roses (4)	1962	1967	York, Pennsylvania	Renamed the York Pirates

== Map ==
Eastern League team locations

== See also ==
- List of Southern League teams
- List of Texas League teams
- List of Eastern League stadiums
