= List of Texas League teams =

The Texas League has primarily operated in the South Central United States since its founding in 1902, with a hiatus from 1943 to 1945 during World War II. For the 2021 season, the league was named the Double-A Central before reverting to its original name in 2022. Over that 125-season span, its teams have relocated, changed names, transferred to different leagues, or ceased operations altogether. This list documents all teams which played in the league.

== Teams ==
Key
Team name (#)	A number following a team's name indicates multiple iterations of the team in chronological order.

Team	First season	Last season	Location	Fate
Albuquerque Dodgers	1965	1971	Albuquerque, New Mexico	Transferred to the Pacific Coast League as the Albuquerque Dukes
Albuquerque Dukes	1962	1964	Albuquerque, New Mexico	Renamed the Albuquerque Dodgers
Alexandria Aces	1972	1975	Alexandria, Louisiana	Folded
Amarillo Giants	1968	1974	Amarillo, Texas	Relocated to Lafayette, Louisiana, as the Lafayette Drillers
Amarillo Gold Sox (1)	1959	1963	Amarillo, Texas	Folded
Amarillo Gold Sox (2)	1976	1982	Amarillo, Texas	Relocated to Beaumont, Texas, as the Beaumont Golden Gators
Amarillo Sod Poodles	2019	—	Amarillo, Texas	Active
Amarillo Sonics	1965	1967	Amarillo, Texas	Renamed the Amarillo Giants
Ardmore Rosebuds	1961	1961	Ardmore, Oklahoma	Folded
Ardmore Territorians	1904	1904	Ardmore, Oklahoma	Folded
Arkansas Travelers	1966	—	Little Rock, Arkansas	Active
Austin Braves	1965	1967	Austin, Texas	Relocated to Shreveport, Louisiana, as the Shreveport Braves
Austin Senators (Note: The Austin Senators were dropped by the league on June 6, 1905, played the 1906 season in the South Texas League, and were inactive for the 1909 and 1910 seasons.) (1)	1905	1914	Austin, Texas	Folded
Austin Senators (2)	1956	1964	Austin, Texas	Renamed the Austin Braves
Beaumont Exporters (Note: The Beaumont Exporters were known as the Beaumont Roughnecks from 1950 to 1952.)	1920	1955	Beaumont, Texas	Transferred to the Big State League
Beaumont Golden Gators	1983	1986	Beaumont, Texas	Relocated to Wichita, Kansas as the Wichita Pilots
Beaumont Oilers (Note: The Beaumont Oilers were inactive for the 1918 season.)	1912	1919	Beaumont, Texas	Renamed the Beaumont Exporters
Beaumont Roughnecks	1950	1952	Beaumont, Texas	Renamed the Beaumont Exporters
Cleburne Railroaders	1906	1906	Cleburne, Texas	Folded
Corpus Christi Giants	1958	1959	Corpus Christi, Texas	Relocated to Harlingen, Texas as the Rio Grande Valley Giants
Corpus Christi Hooks	2005	—	Corpus Christi, Texas	Active
Corsicana Oil Citys (Note: The Corsicana Oil Citys were also known as the Corsicana Oil City Indians in 1902 and Corsicana Oil City Oilers in 1904.)	1902	1904	Corsicana, Texas	Renamed the Corsicana Oilers
Corsicana Oilers	1905	1905	Corsicana, Texas	Folded on June 1
Dallas Eagles	1948	1957	Dallas, Texas	Renamed the Dallas Rangers
Dallas Giants	1903	1918	Dallas, Texas	Renamed the Dallas Marines
Dallas Griffins	1902	1902	Dallas, Texas	Renamed the Dallas Giants
Dallas Marines	1919	1919	Dallas, Texas	Renamed the Dallas Submarines
Dallas Rangers	1958	1958	Dallas, Texas	Transferred to the American Association
Dallas Rebels	1939	1947	Dallas, Texas	Renamed the Dallas Eagles
Dallas Steers	1922	1938	Dallas, Texas	Renamed the Dallas Rebels
Dallas Submarines	1920	1921	Dallas, Texas	Renamed the Dallas Steers
Dallas–Fort Worth Spurs	1965	1971	Dallas and Fort Worth, Texas	Folded
El Paso Diablos	1974	2004	El Paso, Texas	Relocated to Springfield, Missouri, as the Springfield Cardinals
El Paso Dodgers (Note: The El Paso Dodgers were also known as the El Paso Sun Dodgers.)	1972	1972	El Paso, Texas	Renamed the El Paso Sun Kings
El Paso Sun Kings (Note: The El Paso Sun Kings were inactive for the 1971 season and known as the El Paso Dodgers in 1972.)	1962	1973	El Paso, Texas	Renamed the El Paso Diablos
Fort Worth Cats (Note: The Fort Worth Cats played the 1959–1963 seasons in the American Association.)	1932	1964	Fort Worth, Texas	Merged with the Dallas Rangers to become the Dallas–Fort Worth Spurs
Fort Worth Panthers	1902	1931	Fort Worth, Texas	Renamed the Fort Worth Cats
Frisco RoughRiders	2003	—	Frisco, Texas	Active
Galveston Buccaneers	1931	1937	Galveston, Texas	Relocated to Shreveport, Louisiana, as the Shreveport Sports (2)
Galveston Pirates (Note: The Galveston Pirates were inactive for the 1918 season.)	1912	1921	Galveston, Texas	Renamed the Galveston Sand Crabs
Galveston Sand Crabs (Note: The Galveston Sand Crabs were known as the Galveston Pirates from 1912 to 1921.)	1907	1924	Galveston, Texas	Folded
Greenville Hunters	1906	1906	Greenville, Texas	Folded on June 30 then transferred to the North Texas League
Houston Buffaloes (Note: The Houston Buffaloes were also known as the Houston Mud Cats in 1907.)	1907	1958	Houston, Texas	Transferred to the American Association as the Houston Buffs
Jackson Generals	1991	1999	Jackson, Mississippi	Relocated to Round Rock, Texas as the Round Rock Express
Jackson Mets	1975	1990	Jackson, Mississippi	Renamed the Jackson Generals
Lafayette Drillers	1975	1976	Lafayette, Louisiana	Relocated to Tulsa, Oklahoma, as the Tulsa Drillers
Longview Cannibals	1932	1932	Longview, Texas	Transferred to the Dixie League
Memphis Blues	1968	1973	Memphis, Tennessee	Transferred to the International League
Midland Angels	1985	1998	Midland, Texas	Renamed the Midland RockHounds
Midland Cubs	1972	1984	Midland, Texas	Renamed the Midland Angels
Midland RockHounds	1999	—	Midland, Texas	Active
Northwest Arkansas Naturals	2008	—	Springdale, Arkansas	Active
Oklahoma City Indians (Note: The Oklahoma City Indians were known as the Oklahoma City Mets in 1910.) (1)	1909	1911	Oklahoma City, Oklahoma	Transferred to the Oklahoma State League as the Oklahoma City Senators
Oklahoma City Indians (2)	1933	1957	Oklahoma City, Oklahoma	Folded
Oklahoma City Mets	1910	1910	Oklahoma City, Oklahoma	Renamed the Oklahoma City Indians (1)
Ozarks Springbirds	2027	—	Springfield, Missouri	Active
Paris Eisenfelder's Homeseekers	1902	1902	Paris, Texas	Renamed the Paris Parasites
Paris Parasites (Note: The Paris Parasites were also known as the Paris Steers in 1903.) (1)	1903	1903	Paris, Texas	Relocated to Waco, Texas, as the Waco Steers on June 26
Paris Parasites (Note: The Paris Parasites were also known as the Paris Red Ravens in 1904.) (2)	1904	1904	Paris, Texas	Relocated to Ardmore, Oklahoma, as the Ardmore Territorians on August 5
Rio Grande Valley Giants	1960	1961	Harlingen, Texas	Relocated to Victoria, Texas, as the Victoria Giants on June 10
Round Rock Express	2000	2004	Round Rock, Texas	Relocated to Corpus Christi, Texas, as the Corpus Christi Hooks
San Antonio Bears	1920	1928	San Antonio, Texas	Renamed the San Antonio Indians
San Antonio Brewers	1972	1976	San Antonio, Texas	Renamed the San Antonio Dodgers
San Antonio Bronchos (Note: The San Antonio Bronchos were also known as the San Antonio Aces in 1919.)	1907	1919	San Antonio, Texas	Renamed the San Antonio Bears
San Antonio Bullets	1963	1964	San Antonio, Texas	Relocated to Amarillo, Texas, as the Amarillo Sonics
San Antonio Dodgers	1977	1987	San Antonio, Texas	Renamed the San Antonio Missions (3)
San Antonio Indians	1929	1932	San Antonio, Texas	Renamed the San Antonio Missions (1)
San Antonio Missions (1)	1933	1962	San Antonio, Texas	Renamed the San Antonio Bullets
San Antonio Missions (2)	1968	1971	San Antonio, Texas	Relocated to Midland, Texas, as the Midland Cubs
San Antonio Missions (3)	1988	2018	San Antonio, Texas	Relocated to Amarillo, Texas, as the Amarillo Sod Poodles
San Antonio Missions (Note: In 2019, a Triple-A team moved to San Antonio and assumed the Missions' name. As part of the MiLB Reorganization of 2021, it was then downgraded to a Double-A team and placed in the Texas League.) (4)	2021	—	San Antonio, Texas	Active
Sherman–Denison Students	1902	1902	Sherman and Denison, Texas	Relocated to Texarkana, Texas, as the Texarkana Casketmakers on May 6
Shreveport Braves	1968	1970	Shreveport, Louisiana	Folded
Shreveport Captains	1971	2000	Shreveport, Louisiana	Renamed the Shreveport Swamp Dragons
Shreveport Gassers	1915	1924	Shreveport, Louisiana	Renamed the Shreveport Sports
Shreveport Pirates	1908	1910	Shreveport, Louisiana	Folded
Shreveport Sports (1)	1925	1932	Shreveport, Louisiana	Relocated to Tyler, Texas, as the Tyler Sports on May 16 after ballkpark burned
Shreveport Sports (2)	1938	1957	Shreveport, Louisiana	Transferred to the Southern Association in 1959
Shreveport Swamp Dragons	2001	2002	Shreveport, Louisiana	Relocated to Frisco, Texas, as the Frisco RoughRiders
Springfield Cardinals	2005	2026	Springfield, Missouri	Renamed the Ozarks Springbirds
Temple Boll Weevils	1905	1907	Temple, Texas	Folded
Texarkana Casketmakers	1902	1902	Texarkana, Texas	Folded on July 8
Tulsa Drillers	1977	—	Tulsa, Oklahoma	Active
Tulsa Oilers	1933	1965	Tulsa, Oklahoma	Transferred to the Pacific Coast League
Tyler Sports	1932	1932	Tyler, Texas	Folded
Victoria Giants	1961	1961	Victoria, Texas	Folded
Victoria Rosebuds	1958	1961	Victoria, Texas	Relocated to Ardmore, Oklahoma, as the Ardmore Rosebuds on May 27
Victoria Toros	1974	1974	Victoria, Texas	Relocated to Jackson, Mississippi as the Jackson Mets
Waco Cubs	1925	1930	Waco, Texas	Relocated to Galveston, Texas, as the Galveston Buccaneers
Waco Navigators	1906	1919	Waco, Texas	Relocated to Wichita Falls, Texas, as the Wichita Falls Spudders
Waco Steers	1903	1903	Waco, Texas	Folded
Waco Tigers (1)	1902	1902	Waco, Texas	Folded on July 8
Waco Tigers (2)	1905	1905	Waco, Texas	Renamed the Waco Navigators
Wichita Falls Spudders	1920	1932	Wichita Falls, Texas	Relocated to Longview, Texas, as the Longview Cannibals on May 20
Wichita Pilots	1987	1988	Wichita, Kansas	Renamed the Wichita Wranglers
Wichita Turbo Tubs	2027	—	Wichita, Kansas	Active
Wichita Wind Surge	2021	2026	Wichita, Kansas	Renamed the Wichita Turbo Tubs
Wichita Wranglers	1989	2007	Wichita, Kansas	Relocated to Springdale, Arkansas as the Northwest Arkansas Naturals

== Map ==
Texas League team locations

== See also ==
- List of Eastern League teams
- List of Southern League teams
- List of Texas League stadiums
