= 1926 New York-Pennsylvania League season =

The 1926 New York–Pennsylvania League season was the minor league baseball league's fourth season of play. The Scranton Miners finished the season with the best overall record, and were declared the league champions. The New York–Pennsylvania League played at the Class B level during this season.

== Final standings ==
New York–Pennsylvania League
Club	Wins	Losses	Win %	GB
Scranton Miners	84	50	.627	--
York White Roses	79	57	.581	6.0
Williamsport Grays	69	65	.515	15.0
Elmira Colonels	68	67	.504	16.5
Binghamton Triplets	67	67	.500	17.0
Shamokin Indians	61	68	.473	20.5
Wilkes-Barre Barons	56	73	.434	25.5
Harrisburg Senators	47	84	.359	35.5

== Stats ==
=== Batting leaders ===
Stat	Player	Total
AVG	Red Shilling (York)	.366
HR	John Rosebury (Shamokin)	10
RBI	Francis Farrell (Scranton)	93
R		
H		
SB		

=== Pitching leaders ===
Stat	Player	Total
W	Eddie Williams (Elmira)	22
L		
ERA	Ed Matteson (Scranton/York)	1.80
SO	Henry Hoffman (Williamsport)	129
IP		
SV		
