= List of Southern League stadiums =

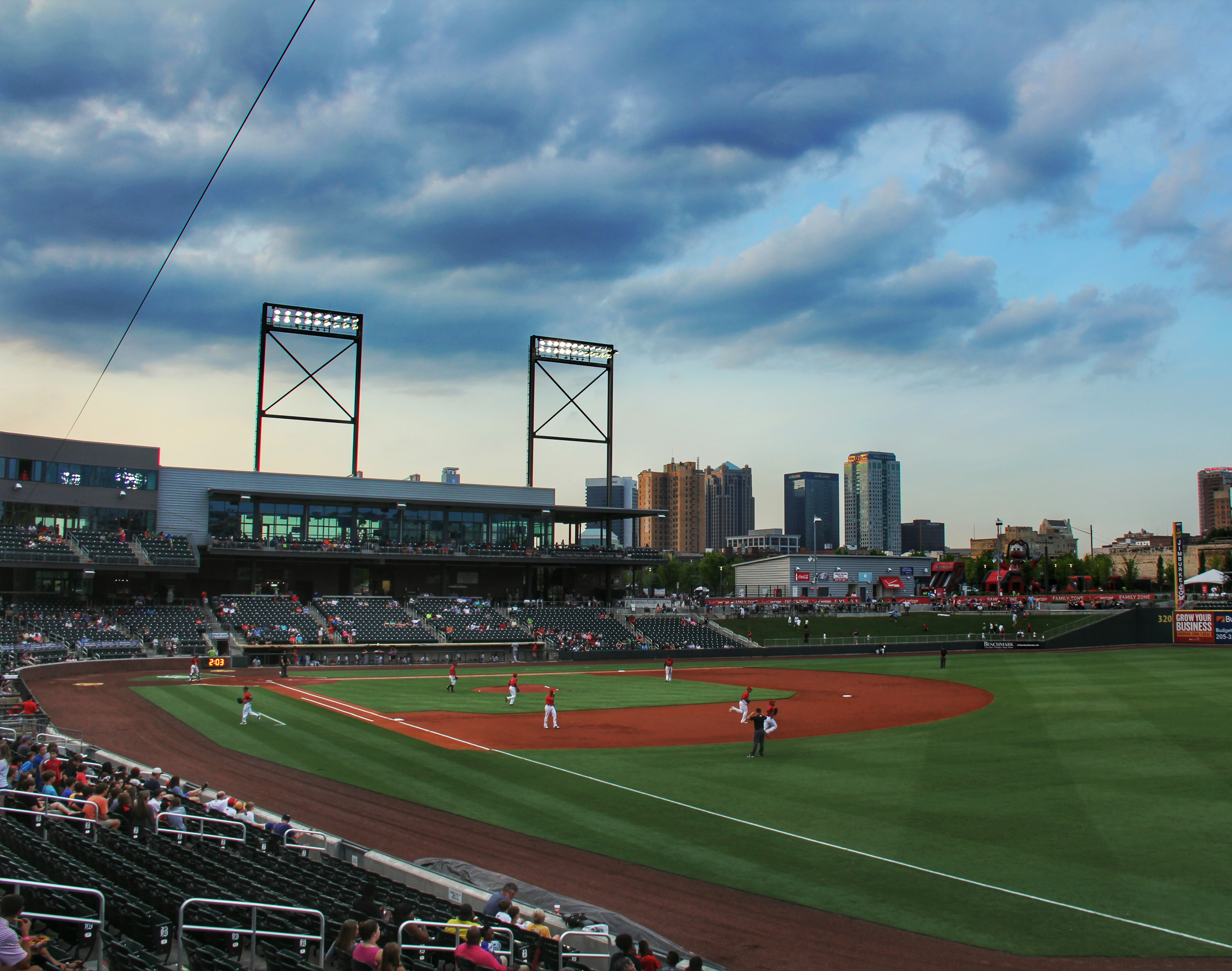
Regions Field, home of the Birmingham Barons

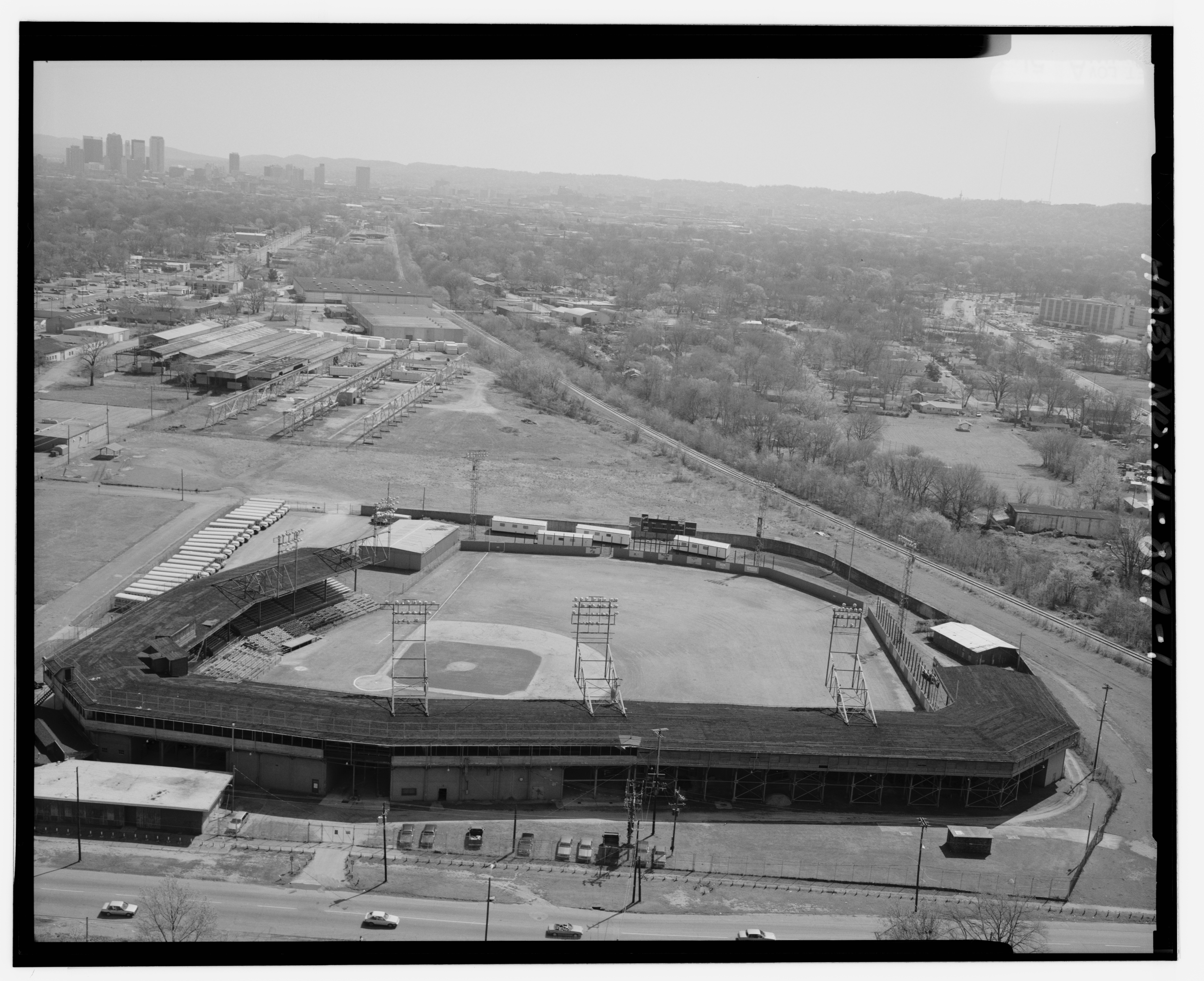
Rickwood Field, a former home of the Birmingham Barons

There are eight stadiums in use by Southern League (SL) baseball teams. The oldest stadium is Pinnacle Park (1926) in Columbus, Georgia, which became the home of the Columbus Clingstones in 2025. The newest stadium is Erlanger Park (2026) in Chattanooga, Tennessee, home of the Chattanooga Lookouts. One stadium was built in each of the 1920s and 2000s, and three in each of the 2010s and 2020s. The highest seating capacity is 8,500 at Regions Field in Birmingham, Alabama, where the Birmingham Barons play. The lowest capacity is 5,038 at Blue Wahoos Stadium in Pensacola, Florida, where the Pensacola Blue Wahoos play. All stadiums use a grass surface.

Since its founding, there have been nearly 40 stadiums located among nearly 30 municipalities known to have been used by the league. Although a few other leagues had contributed to the history of the SL, it was decided that the league would not maintain records prior to the 1964 season. Therefore, the list does not include stadiums from its predecessor leagues. The oldest stadium to have hosted SL games is Rickwood Field (1910), home of the Birmingham Barons; Erlanger Park is also the newest of all stadiums to host SL games. The highest seating capacity was 17,000 at Herschel Greer Stadium, the Nashville Sounds home. The stadium with the lowest capacity was Knights Park, home of the Charlotte Hornets and Charlotte O's/Knights, which seated only 3,000.

== Active stadiums and map ==
Current stadium locations:
- North Division
- South Division

Name	Team	City	State	Opened	Capacity	Ref.
Erlanger Park	Chattanooga Lookouts	Chattanooga	Tennessee	2026	8,032	
Blue Wahoos Stadium	Pensacola Blue Wahoos	Pensacola	Florida	2012	5,038	
Covenant Health Park	Knoxville Smokies	Knoxville	Tennessee	2025	6,355	
Keesler Federal Park	Biloxi Shuckers	Biloxi	Mississippi	2015	6,076	
Dabos Park	Montgomery Biscuits	Montgomery	Alabama	2004	7,000	
Regions Field	Birmingham Barons	Birmingham	Alabama	2013	8,500	
Pinnacle Park	Columbus Clingstones	Columbus	Georgia	1926	5,500	
Toyota Field	Rocket City Trash Pandas	Madison	Alabama	2020	7,000	

=== Gallery ===
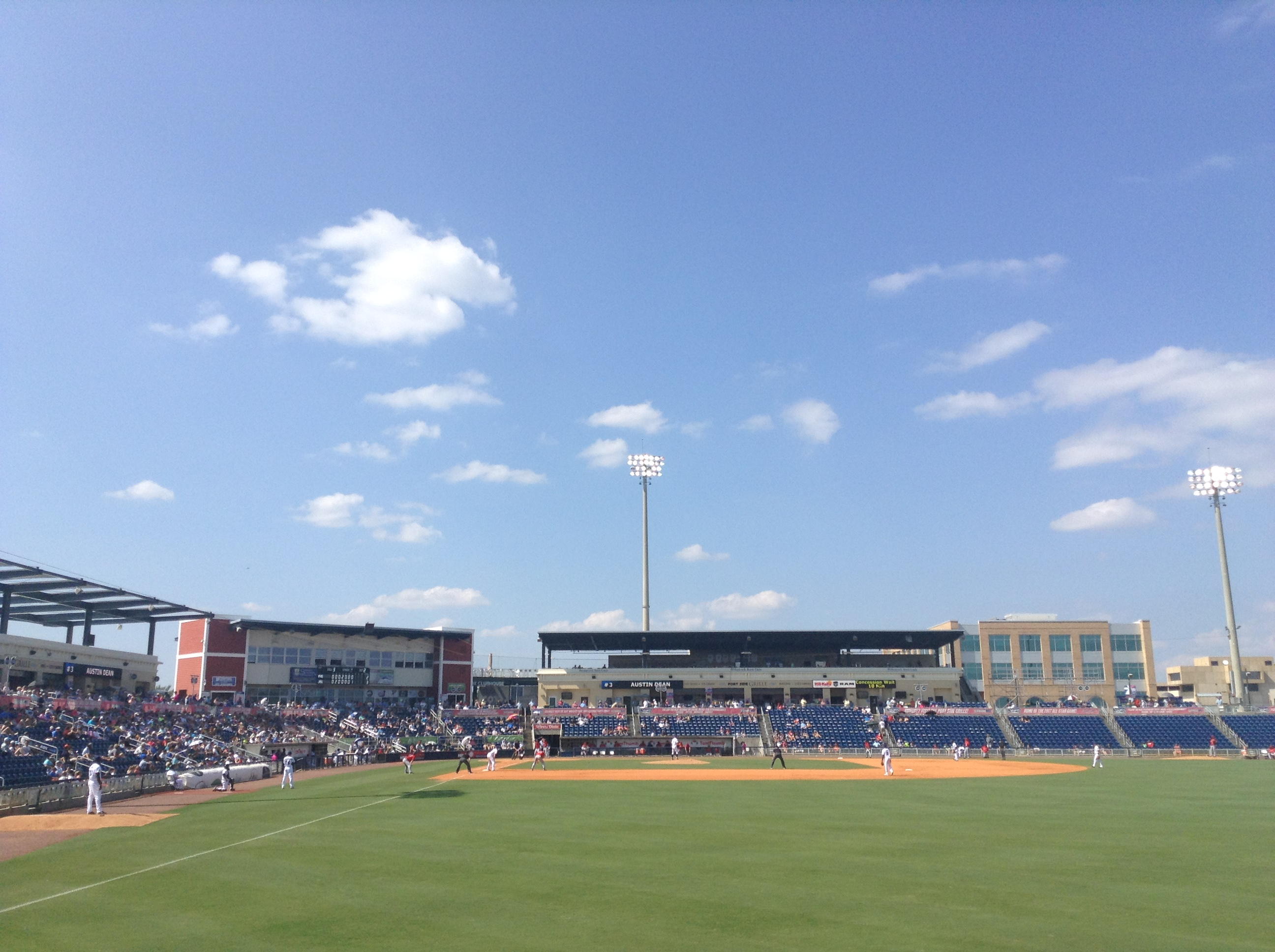
Blue Wahoos Stadium (Pensacola Blue Wahoos)

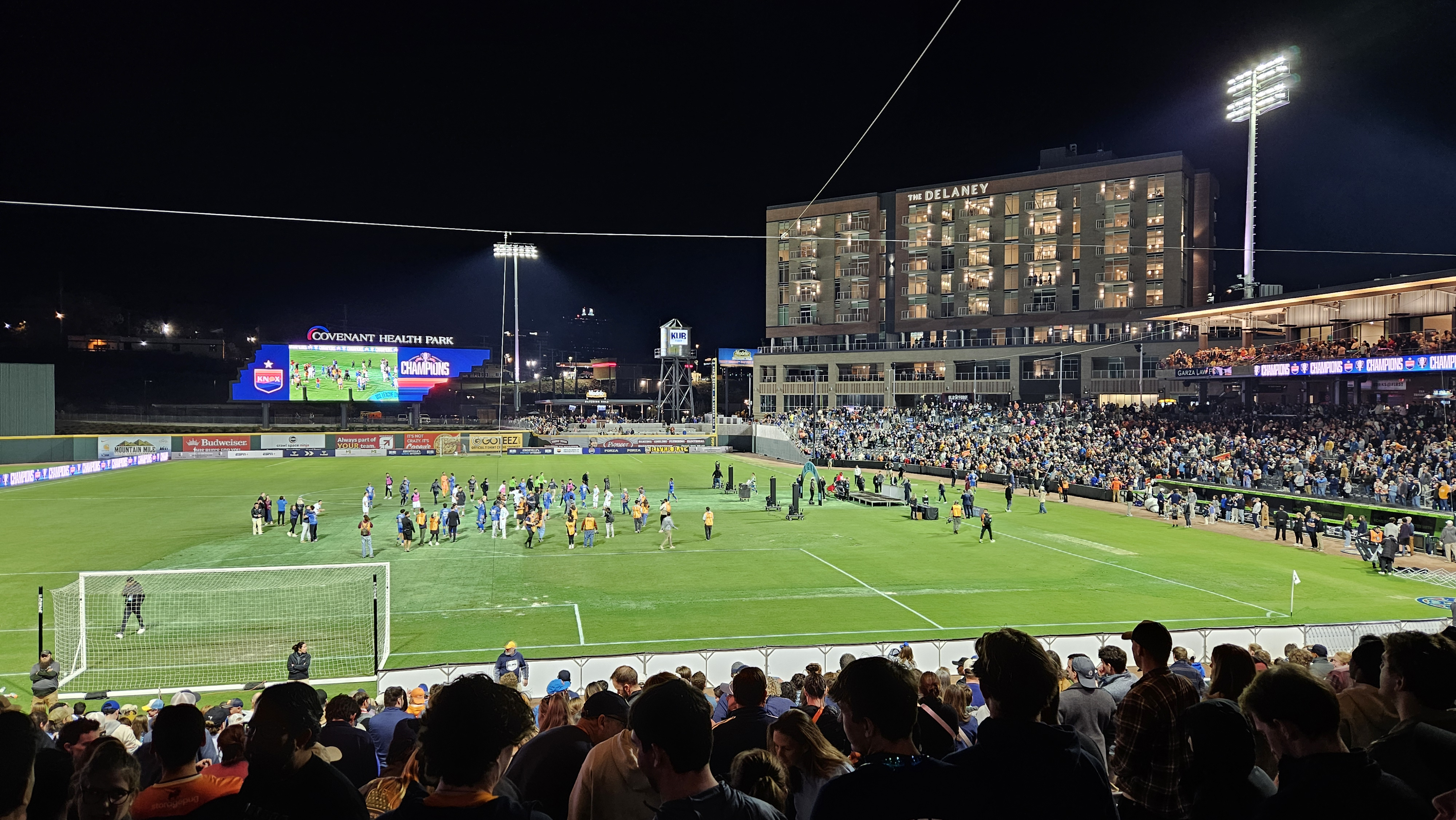
Covenant Health Park (Knoxville Smokies)

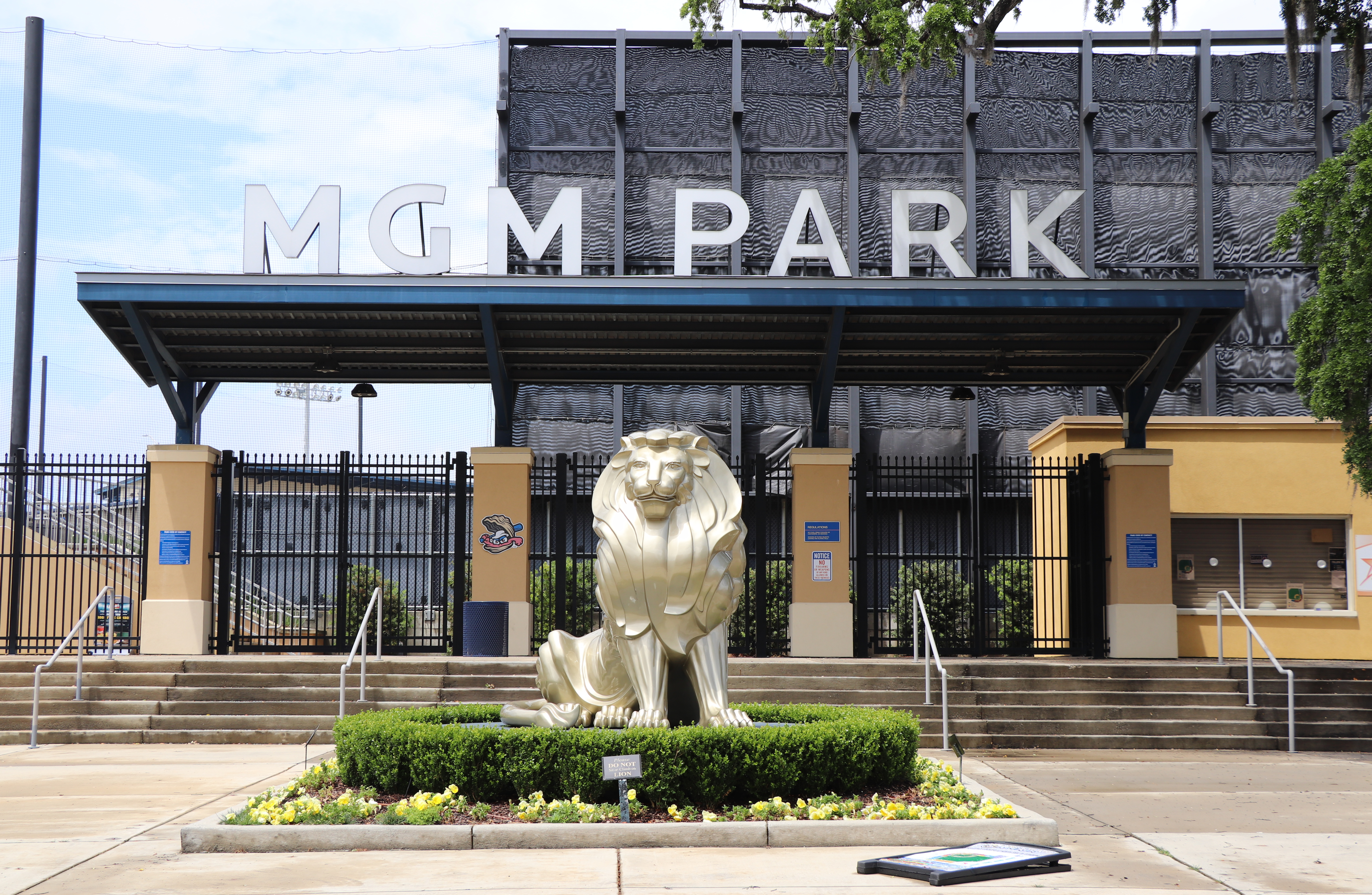
Keesler Federal Park (Biloxi Shuckers)

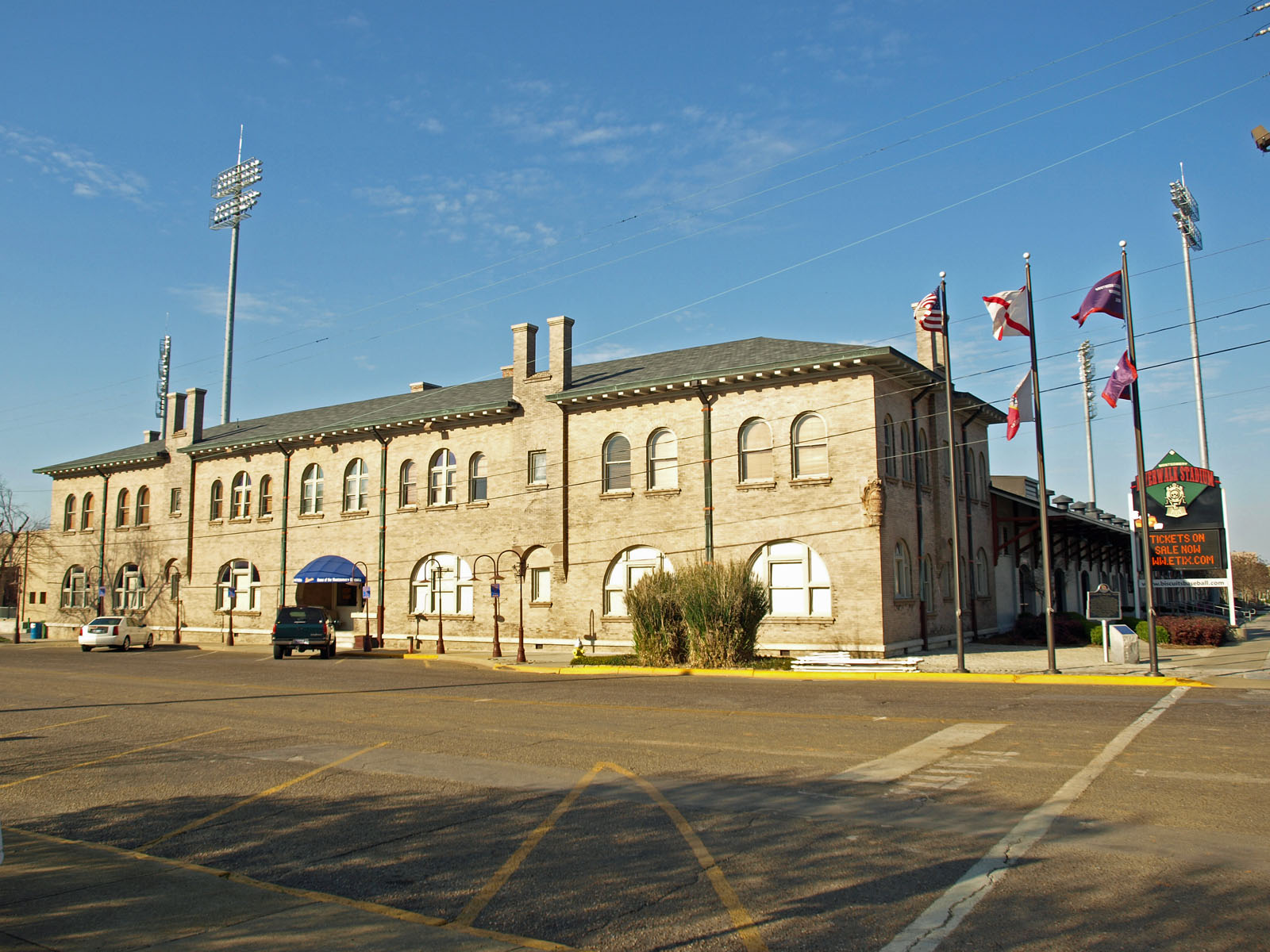
Dabos Park (Montgomery Biscuits)

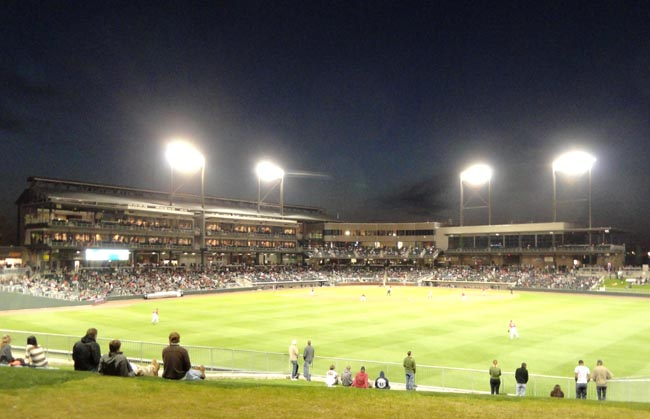
Regions Field (Birmingham Barons)

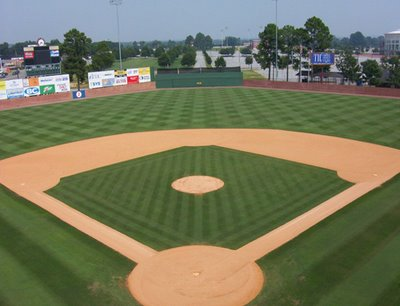
Synovus Park (Columbus Clingstones)

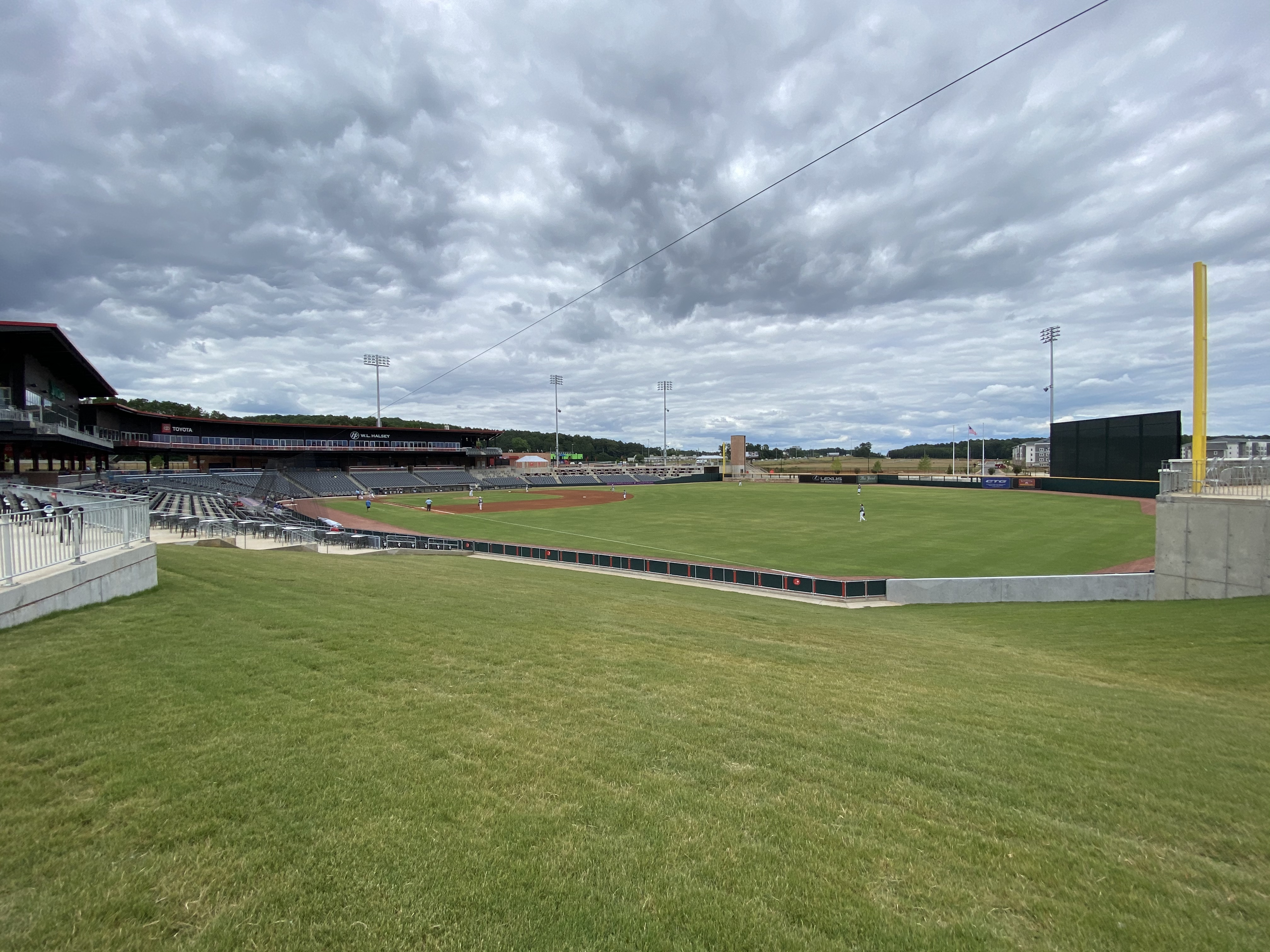
Toyota Field (Rocket City Trash Pandas)

== All stadiums ==
Key
Name	Stadium's name in its most recent season of hosting SL baseball
Opened	Opening of earliest stadium variant used for hosting SL baseball
Capacity	Stadium's most recent capacity while hosting SL baseball

Name	Team	Location	State	Opened	Capacity	Ref(s)
121 Financial Ballpark (Note: 121 Financial Ballpark's previous names were the Baseball Grounds of Jacksonville and Community First Park.)	Jacksonville Suns/Jumbo Shrimp	Jacksonville	Florida	2003	11,000	
AT&T Field	Chattanooga Lookouts	Chattanooga	Tennessee	2000	6,362	
The Ballpark at Jackson (Note: The Ballpark at Jackson was originally named Pringles Park.)	West Tenn Diamond Jaxx/Jackson Generals	Jackson	Tennessee	1998	6,000	
Bill Meyer Stadium (Note: Bill Meyer Stadium was also known as Municipal Stadium and Smithson Stadium, and its playing surface is called Neil Ridley Field.)	Knoxville Smokies/Sox/Blue Jays	Knoxville	Tennessee	1953	6,412	
Blue Wahoos Stadium (Note: Blue Wahoos Stadium is also known as BayFront Stadium, and its playinmg surface is called Admiral Fetterman Field.)	Pensacola Blue Wahoos	Pensacola	Florida	2012	5,038	
Bosse Field	Evansville White Sox	Evansville	Indiana	1915	5,382	
Brooks Field	Port City Roosters	Wilmington	North Carolina	1989	3,500	
Champion Stadium (Note: Champion Stadium was also known as The Ballpark @ Disney's Wide World of Sports and Cracker Jack Stadium.)	Orlando Rays	Orlando	Florida	1997	9,500	
Covenant Health Park	Knoxville Smokies	Knoxville	Tennessee	2025	6,355	
Dabos Park (Note: Dabos Park was formerly known as Montgomery Riverwalk Stadium.)	Montgomery Biscuits	Montgomery	Alabama	2004	7,000	
Erlanger Park	Chattanooga Lookouts	Chattanooga	Tennessee	2026	8,032	
Five County Stadium	Carolina Mudcats	Zebulon	North Carolina	1991	6,500	
Golden Park II	Columbus Yankees, Columbus White Sox/Astros/Mudcats	Columbus	Georgia	1950	6,600	
Grayson Stadium (Note: Grayson Stadium was also known as Municipal Field (1927–1939).)	Savannah Senators/Indians, Savannah Braves	Savannah	Georgia	1927	7,914	
Greenville Municipal Stadium	Greenville Braves	Greenville	South Carolina	1984	7,027	
Hank Aaron Stadium	Mobile BayBears	Mobile	Alabama	1997	6,000	
Hartwell Field	Mobile Athletics/White Sox	Mobile	Alabama	1927	8,000	
Herschel Greer Stadium	Nashville Sounds, Nashville Xpress	Nashville	Tennessee	1978	17,000	
Hoover Metropolitan Stadium (Note: Hoover Metropolitan Stadium was known as Regions Park (2003–2012).)	Birmingham Barons	Birmingham	Alabama	1988	10,800	
Joe W. Davis Municipal Stadium	Huntsville Stars	Huntsville	Alabama	1985	10,250	
Joe Engel Stadium	Chattanooga Lookouts	Chattanooga	Tennessee	1930	7,000	
Keesler Federal Park (Note: Keesler Federal Park was formerly known as MGM Park.)	Biloxi Shuckers	Biloxi	Mississippi	2015	6,076	
Knights Castle Stadium (Note: During Knights Castle Stadium construction in 1989, the Charlotte Knights played in a temporary structure in the parking lot at this site known as Knights Castle.)	Charlotte Knights	Fort Mill	South Carolina	1990	10,002	
Knights Park (Note: Jim Crockett Memorial Park was also known as Clark Griffith Park (1946–1972) and Jim Crockett Memorial Park (1973-1987).)	Charlotte Hornets, Charlotte O's/Knights	Charlotte	North Carolina	1941	3,000	
Luther Williams Field	Macon Peaches	Macon	Georgia	1929	5,000	
Lynchburg City Stadium (Note: Lynchburg City Stadium was also known as Municipal Stadium (1940–1950), Merritt Hutchinson Stadium (2000–2002), Calvin Falwell Field at City Stadium (2004–2019), and renamed Bank of the James Stadium (2020).)	Lynchburg White Sox	Lynchburg	Virginia	1940	4,500	
McCormick Field (Note: This McCormick Field is also called Old McCormick Field.)	Asheville Tourists/Orioles	Asheville	North Carolina	1924	3,200	
Paterson Field (Note: Paterson Field was also known as Tingley Field (1958) and Municipal Stadium.)	Montgomery Rebels	Montgomery	Alabama	1949	6,000	
Regions Field	Birmingham Barons	Birmingham	Alabama	2013	8,500	
Rickwood Field	Birmingham Barons, Birmingham A's	Birmingham	Alabama	1910	10,741	
Sam M. Wolfson Park (Note: Sam M. Wolfson Park was also known as Jacksonville Baseball Park (1955–1963).)	Jacksonville Suns/Expos	Jacksonville	Florida	1955	8,200	
Smokies Stadium	Tennessee Smokies	Kodak	Tennessee	2000	6,412	
Pinnacle Park (Note: Pinnacle Park was previously called Synovus Park (2025–2026) and Golden Park.)	Columbus Clingstones, Columbus Yankees, Columbus White Sox/Astros/Mudcats	Columbus	Georgia	1926	5,500	
Tim McCarver Stadium (Note: Tim McCarver Stadium was also known as Blues Stadium.)	Memphis Chicks	Memphis	Tennessee	1963	10,000	
Tinker Field	Orlando Twins/SunRays/Cubs/Rays	Orlando	Florida	1914	5,104	
Toyota Field	Rocket City Trash Pandas	Madison	Alabama	2020	7,000	
Trustmark Park	Mississippi Braves	Pearl	Mississippi	2005	8,480	

=== Map ===
Southern League stadium locations

== See also ==
- List of Double-A baseball stadiums
- List of Eastern League stadiums
- List of Texas League stadiums
- List of Southern League teams
