= List of Southern League teams =

The Southern League has operated primarily in the Southern United States since 1964. For the 2021 season, the league was named the Double-A South before switching back to its previous moniker in 2022. Over that 63-season span, its teams relocated, changed names, transferred to different leagues, or ceased operations altogether. This list documents teams which played in the league.

== Teams ==
Key
Team name (#)	A number following a team's name indicates multiple iterations of the team in chronological order.

Team	First season	Last season	Location	Fate
Asheville Orioles	1972	1975	Asheville, North Carolina	Relocated to Charlotte, North Carolina, as the Charlotte O's
Asheville Tourists (Note: The Asheville Tourists played in the Carolina League for the 1967 season.)	1964	1971	Asheville, North Carolina	Renamed the Asheville Orioles
Biloxi Shuckers	2015	–	Biloxi, Mississippi	Active
Birmingham A's	1967	1975	Birmingham, Alabama	Relocated to Chattanooga, Tennessee, as the Chattanooga Lookouts (2)
Birmingham Barons (1)	1964	1965	Birmingham, Alabama	Renamed the Birmingham A's in 1967
Birmingham Barons (2)	1981	–	Birmingham, Alabama	Active
Carolina Mudcats	1991	2011	Zebulon, North Carolina	Relocated to Pensacola, Florida, as the Pensacola Blue Wahoos
Charlotte Hornets	1964	1972	Charlotte, North Carolina	Folded
Charlotte Knights	1988	1992	Charlotte, North Carolina	Transferred to the International League
Charlotte O's	1976	1987	Charlotte, North Carolina	Renamed the Charlotte Knights
Chattanooga Lookouts (1)	1964	1965	Chattanooga, Tennessee	Folded
Chattanooga Lookouts (2)	1976	–	Chattanooga, Tennessee	Active
Columbus Astros	1970	1988	Columbus, Georgia	Renamed the Columbus Mudcats
Columbus Clingstones	2025	–	Columbus, Georgia	Active
Columbus Confederate Yankees	1964	1966	Columbus, Georgia	Folded
Columbus Mudcats	1989	1990	Columbus, Georgia	Relocated to Zebulon, North Carolina, as the Carolina Mudcats
Columbus White Sox	1969	1969	Columbus, Georgia	Renamed the Columbus Astros
Evansville White Sox	1966	1968	Evansville, Indiana	Folded
Greenville Braves	1984	2004	Greenville, South Carolina	Relocated to Pearl, Mississippi, as the Mississippi Braves
Huntsville Stars	1985	2014	Huntsville, Alabama	Relocated to Biloxi, Mississippi, as the Biloxi Shuckers
Jackson Generals	2011	2020 (Note: The Jackson Generals and Jacksonville Jumbo Shrimp last played in the league during the 2019 season, since the 2020 season was cancelled due to the COVID-19 pandemic.)	Jackson, Tennessee	Folded
Jacksonville Expos	1985	1990	Jacksonville, Florida	Renamed the Jacksonville Suns
Jacksonville Jumbo Shrimp	2017	2020	Jacksonville, Florida	Transferred to the International League
Jacksonville Suns (Note: The Jacksonville Suns were known as the Jacksonville Expos from 1985 to 1990.)	1970	2016	Jacksonville, Florida	Renamed the Jacksonville Jumbo Shrimp
Knoxville Blue Jays	1980	1992	Knoxville, Tennessee	Renamed the Knoxville Smokies (2)
Knoxville Smokies (1)	1964	1967	Knoxville, Tennessee	Folded
Knoxville Smokies (2)	1993	1999	Knoxville, Tennessee	Relocated to Kodak, Tennessee, as the Tennessee Smokies
Knoxville Smokies (3)	2025	–	Knoxville, Tennessee	Active
Knoxville Sox	1972	1979	Knoxville, Tennessee	Renamed the Knoxville Blue Jays
Lynchburg White Sox	1964	1965	Lynchburg, Virginia	Transferred to the Carolina League
Macon Peaches (Note: The Macon Peaches did not play during the 1965 season.)	1964	1967	Macon, Georgia	Folded
Memphis Chicks	1978	1997	Memphis, Tennessee	Relocated to Jackson, Tennessee, as the West Tenn Diamond Jaxx
Mississippi Braves	2005	2024	Pearl, Mississippi	Relocated to Columbus, Georgia, as the Columbus Clingstones
Mobile Athletics	1966	1966	Mobile, Alabama	Folded
Mobile BayBears	1997	2019	Mobile, Alabama	Relocated to Madison, Alabama, as the Rocket City Trash Pandas
Mobile White Sox	1970	1970	Mobile, Alabama	Folded
Montgomery Biscuits	2004	–	Montgomery, Alabama	Active
Montgomery Rebels	1965	1980	Montgomery, Alabama	Relocated to Birmingham, Alabama, as the Birmingham Barons (2)
Nashville Sounds (Note: In 1985, a Triple-A team moved to Nashville, Tennessee and assumed the Sounds' name.)	1978	1984	Nashville, Tennessee	Relocated to Huntsville, Alabama, as the Huntsville Stars
Nashville Xpress	1993	1994	Nashville, Tennessee	Relocated to Wilmington, North Carolina, as the Port City Roosters
Orlando Cubs	1993	1996	Orlando, Florida	Renamed the Orlando Rays
Orlando Rays	1997	2003	Orlando, Florida	Relocated to Montgomery, Alabama, as the Montgomery Biscuits
Orlando Sun Rays	1990	1992	Orlando, Florida	Renamed the Orlando Cubs
Orlando Twins	1973	1989	Orlando, Florida	Renamed the Orlando Sun Rays
Pensacola Blue Wahoos	2012	–	Pensacola, Florida	Active
Port City Roosters	1995	1996	Wilmington, North Carolina	Relocated to Mobile, Alabama, as the Mobile BayBears
Rocket City Trash Pandas	2020 (Note: The Rocket City Trash Pandas first played in the league during the 2021 season, since the 2020 season was cancelled due to the COVID-19 pandemic.)	–	Madison, Alabama	Active
Savannah Braves	1971	1983	Savannah, Georgia	Relocated to Greenville, South Carolina, as the Greenville Braves
Savannah Indians	1970	1970	Savannah, Georgia	Renamed the Savannah Braves
Savannah Senators	1968	1969	Savannah, Georgia	Renamed the Savannah Indians
Tennessee Smokies	2000	2024	Kodak, Tennessee	Relocated to Knoxville, Tennessee, as the Knoxville Smokies (3)
West Tenn Diamond Jaxx	1998	2010	Jackson, Tennessee	Renamed the Jackson Generals

== Map ==
Southern League team locations

== See also ==
- List of Eastern League teams
- List of Texas League teams
- List of Southern League stadiums
