= Delta Dental Stadium =

Stadium in Manchester, New Hampshire, US

- The Tooth

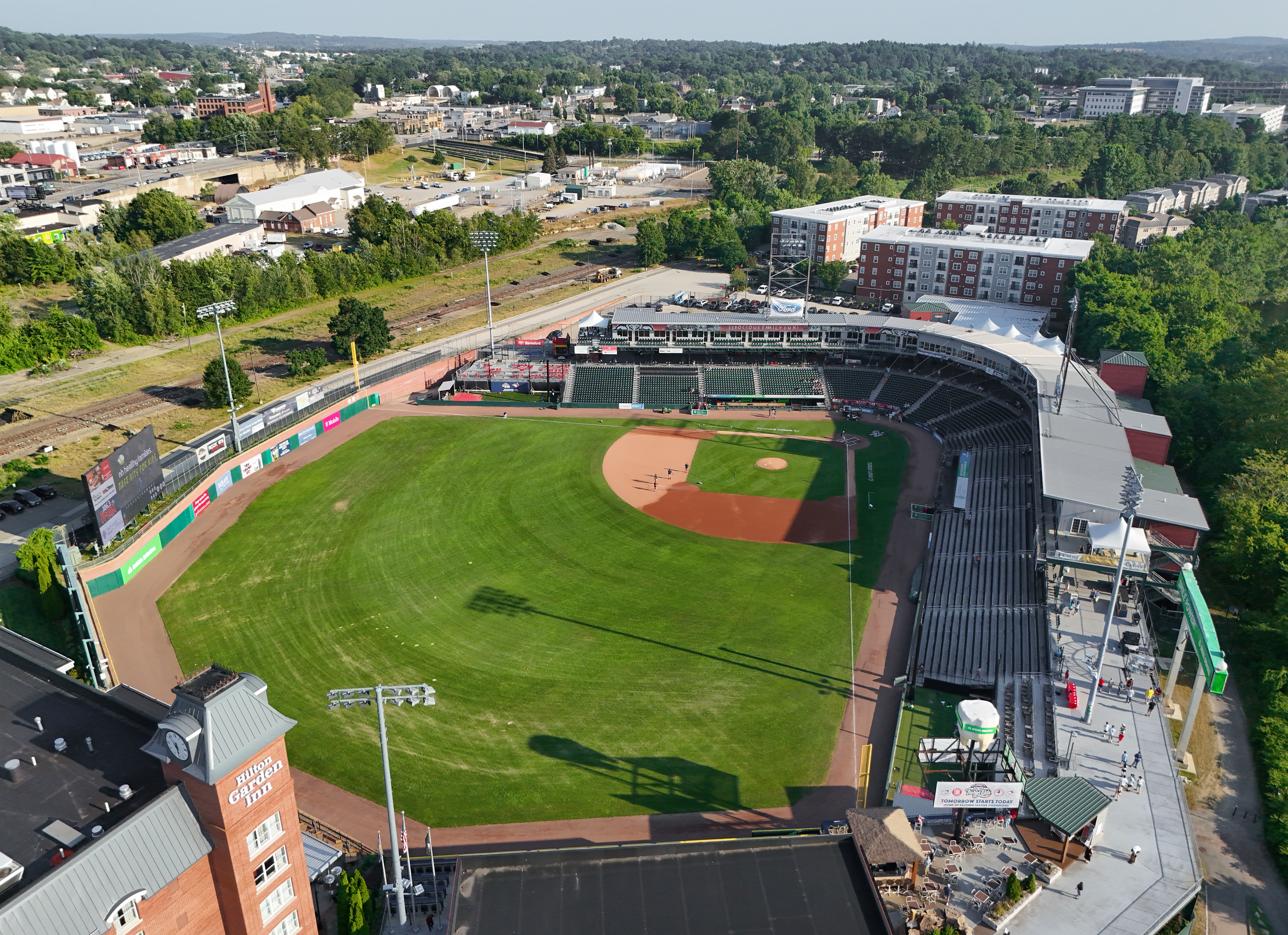

- Location within New Hampshire Location within the United States
- Interactive map of Delta Dental Stadium
- Former names: Northeast Delta Dental Stadium (2012–2021); Merchantsauto.com Stadium (2006–2011); Fisher Cats Ballpark (2005)
- Address: One Line Drive; Manchester, New Hampshire 03102
- Coordinates: 42°58′51″N 71°28′0″W
- Owner: City of Manchester
- Operator: NH Triple Play, LLC.
- Capacity: 6,500
- Surface: Natural Grass
- Field size: Left Field: 326 feet Left Center: 380 feet Center Field: 400 feet Right Center: 353 feet Right Field: 306 feet

Construction
- Groundbreaking: May 7, 2004
- Opened: April 6, 2005
- Cost: $20 million ($33 million in 2025 dollars)
- Architect: HNTB
- Project manager: Parsons Brinckerhoff
- Structural engineers: CLD Consulting Engineers, Inc.
- Services engineers: Henderson Engineers, Inc.
- General contractor: Payton Construction Corp.

Tenant
- New Hampshire Fisher Cats (EL) 2005–present

Delta Dental Stadium (formerly known as Fisher Cats Ballpark, Merchantsauto.com Stadium, and Northeast Delta Dental Stadium) is a stadium in Manchester, New Hampshire that holds 6,500 people. It is used primarily for baseball, and is the home field of the New Hampshire Fisher Cats, an Eastern League baseball team. The first game played at the ballpark was on April 7, 2005, between the New Britain Rock Cats and the Fisher Cats. The first concert was performed by Bob Dylan on August 27, 2006. In 2011 insurance company Northeast Delta Dental signed a 10-year contract for the ballpark's naming rights with a five-year option. The stadium has since updated the name to simply Delta Dental Stadium although Northeast Delta Dental is still the stadium naming rights holder.

== Features ==
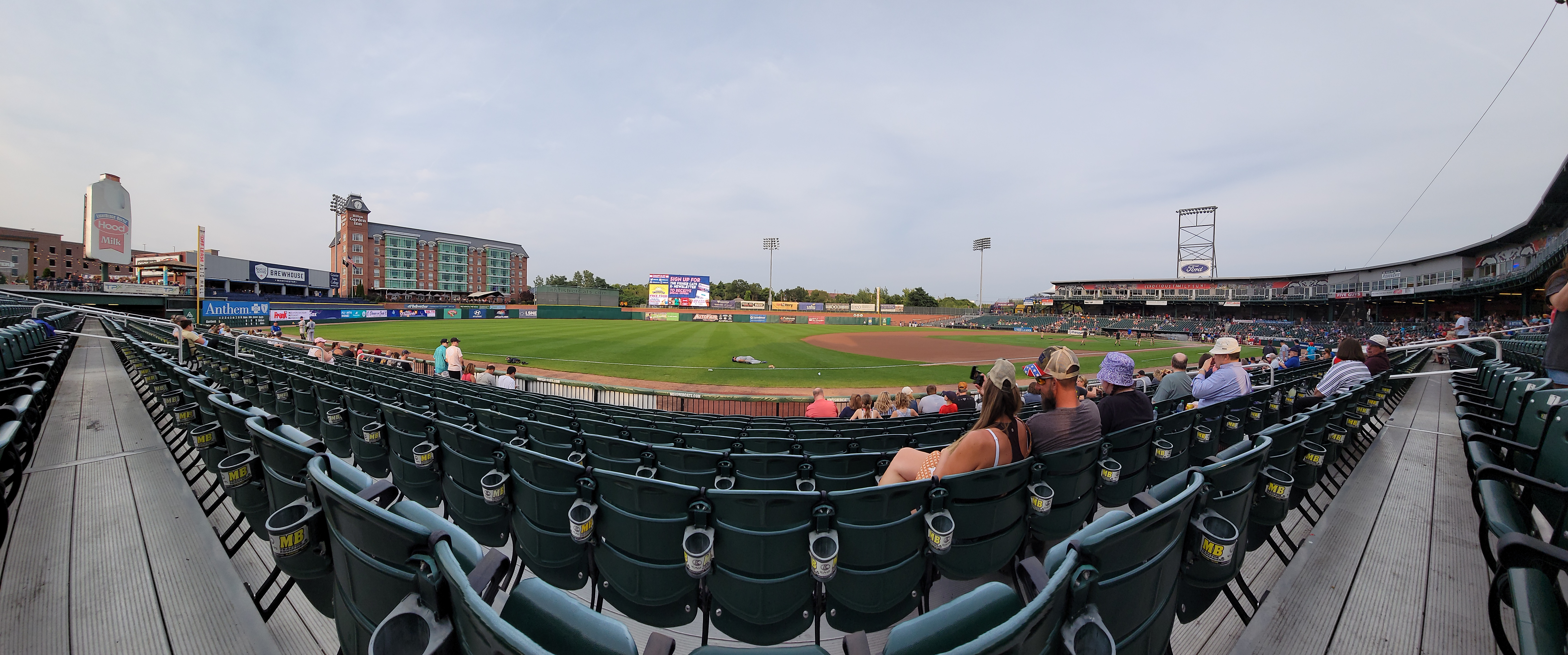
NE Delta Dental Stadium, August 2021

The park was built on the former Singer Park in the Manchester Millyard, a soccer (and occasionally rugby) stadium that was also used for circuses, carnivals and a summer concert series. In 2017, 1,000 seats were added when renovations were done on the left field section of the park. At least a portion of the ballpark is located on the site where bricks recovered from the demolition of the Arms Textile Mill were buried. The Arms Textile Mill was the site of the deadliest outbreak of anthrax in United States history.

The ballpark is located in the downtown area along the Merrimack River, facing northwest towards the heart of downtown. The park is within walking distance of many local landmarks, including Manchester's mill district, the SNHU Arena, the WMUR television station, the University of New Hampshire at Manchester college campus, and countless restaurants, bars, and hotels. It has an open concourse, allowing fans to view the action on the field at all times, and includes 32 luxury suites that line the upper level and provide fans with a panoramic view of the field.

One of the dominant features is the Hilton Garden Inn hotel located beyond the fence in left-center field. The hotel is 7 stories high (6 excluding clock tower) and has more than 125 rooms; each room on the south side of the hotel has windows that overlook center field and have shatterproof glass due to the proximity to the park. The Hilton hotel also has a restaurant which offers outdoor patio seating directly overlooking left-center field. Delta Dental Stadium is one of the only professional baseball fields in the United States with a hotel located inside/ alongside the stadium.

In April 2008 the park opened the Sam Adams Bar and Grill, offering a buffet, full menu, and bar directly overlooking the left field of the park. The Bar and Grill is now known as the Sam Adams Brewhouse.

Prior to the start of the 2017 season, the Fisher Cats announced the most ambitious renovation project in the stadium's history. Team owner Art Solomon invested a million dollars into the facility to transform the left field plaza and pavilion, adding a new tiered seating section beyond the left field wall, a state-of-the-art live music stage, a tiki bar and a rock waterfall at the top of the main entrance stairs. The project was completed in time for Opening Day 2017.

In 2019, the Fisher Cats began transitioning the field to organic turf management with support from sponsor Stonyfield Farm's #playfree campaign. It is the first professional baseball field to transition to all organic management.

== Notable events ==
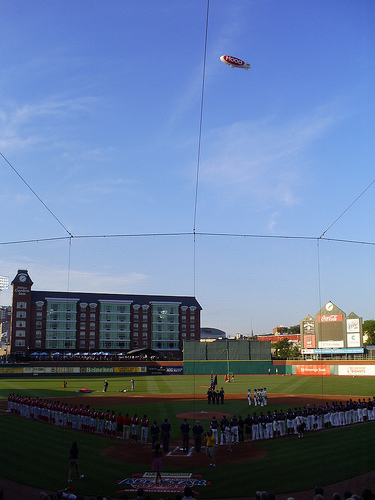
Northeast Delta Dental Stadium during the 2008 Eastern League All-Star Game

On October 21, 2006, the stadium hosted the funeral service for fallen city police officer Michael Briggs, who was shot while responding to a domestic dispute call.

On July 16, 2008, the stadium hosted a record 8,762 fans for the 2008 Northeast Delta Dental Eastern League All-Star Game. This record was surpassed on May 26, 2009, with 8,903 fans in attendance. Red Sox pitcher John Smoltz started the game for the opposing Portland Sea Dogs in a rehab start.

Major League Baseball's future stars returned for the Eastern League All-Star Game on July 13, 2011, and again in 2017 for the Eastern League All-Star Classic July 11–12. The facility is the only stadium in the league to host the game three times in a decade.
