= Dallas Submarines =

The Dallas Submarines, based in Dallas, Texas, United States, were a minor league baseball team that played from 1917 to 1918 in the Texas League. They were managed by Ham Patterson both years. Following the 1922 season, the Dallas team became known as the Dallas Steers.
