= Rio Grande Valley Giants =

American minor league baseball franchise

The Rio Grande Valley Giants was an American minor league baseball franchise in the Double-A Texas League located in Harlingen, Texas, that played from the beginning of the 1960 season through June 10, 1961. As its nickname implies, the team was affiliated with the San Francisco Giants. It played its home games at Harlingen Field.

The Texas League underwent a massive face lift in the late 1950s after three of its top franchises — Dallas, Fort Worth and Houston — moved up to the Triple-A American Association for the 1959 season.

The Corpus Christi Giants, which joined the TL in 1958, finished last in attendance (61,500) in 1959, and transferred to Harlingen over the winter. Harlingen had been represented in numerous lower-level minor leagues, most recently the Big State League (1954–55).

In 1960, the Rio Grande Valley club won the regular-season pennant and finished third in attendance (75,000) in the six-team league. But the following season, a poor club on the field resulted in a severe attendance decline, and the Giants moved to Victoria, Texas, in mid-June. Harlingen has since had clubs in the Gulf States League and the Lone Star League of the 1970s and in independent leagues since 1994.

== Notable alumni ==
- Bobby Bolin
- Chuck Hiller
- Manny Mota
- Gaylord Perry
- José Tartabull
