= Williamsport Tomahawks =

- 1976; Williamsport, Pennsylvania

Minor league affiliations
- Class: Double-A (1976)
- League: Eastern League (1976)

Major league affiliations
- Team: Cleveland Indians (1976)

Team data
- Name: Williamsport Tomahawks (1976)
- Ballpark: Bowman Field (1976)

The Williamsport Tomahawks were the Class AA Eastern League affiliate of the Cleveland Indians in Williamsport, Pennsylvania during the 1976 season. The franchise moved to Williamsport from Thetford Mines, Quebec where they were known as the Thetford Mines Miners. The Tomahawks finished the season with a record of 48-91, worst in the league. Despite the lackluster record, the team had a total attendance of 53,757 at Bowman Field, which placed them 4th in an 8 team league.

Before the next season, the Tomahawks moved to Jersey City, New Jersey as the Jersey City Indians, due to conflicts between ownership and the Williamsport municipal government over beer sales and field maintenance issues. Members of the Tomahawks who would go on to have lengthy careers in the Major Leagues included Alfredo Griffin, Ron Hassey and Larry Andersen.

== Record ==
Year	Record	Finish	Manager	Playoffs
1976	48-91	8th	John "Red" Davis	
