= Reading Red Sox =

American minor-league professional baseball team

The Reading Red Sox were a minor league baseball affiliate of the Boston Red Sox baseball franchise.

== History ==
The team was based in Reading, Pennsylvania, and played in the Class A New York–Pennsylvania League (1933–1934) and its successor league, the Double-A Eastern League (1963–1964). During the latter period, the manager was Eddie Popowski and the team featured such star players as veteran former Red Sox slugger Dick Gernert, a Reading native, and prospects Mike Andrews, Joe Foy, Tony Horton, Mike Ryan, Rico Petrocelli and Reggie Smith.

In 1965, Boston moved its AA affiliate to Pittsfield, Massachusetts, and the Cleveland Indians re-established a farm club in Reading, where the Indians had a successful affiliate from 1950 to 1961. Since 1967, the Philadelphia Phillies have based their Double-A affiliate in the city (named the Reading Fightin Phils as of 2021); it led the Eastern League in attendance in 2006.

== Notable players ==
- See Category:Reading Red Sox players

Preceded by Memphis Chickasaws (1958)	Boston Red Sox; Double-A affiliate 1963–1964	Succeeded by Pittsfield Red Sox
