= Shamokin Shammies =

- 1925–1928; Shamokin, Pennsylvania

Minor league affiliations
- Previous classes: Class B
- League: New York-Pennsylvania League; Anthracite League (1928)

Team data
- Previous names: Shamokin Indians (1926-1928); Shamokin Shammies (1925); Oneonta Indians (1924)

The Shamokin Shammies played baseball in the first New York-Pennsylvania League in 1925, going 54-77, last in the eight team league. They were formed when the Oneonta Indians relocated to Shamokin, Pennsylvania after the 1924 season. The team changed its name to the Shamokin Indians for the 1926 through 1928 seasons.

== Notable alumni ==
- Jim Curry
- Harry Davis
- Ollie Hanson
- Glenn Killinger
- LaRue Kirby
- Rudy Kneisch
- Red Lutz
- Bill Morrisette
- Dutch Schesler
- Amos Strunk

== Year-by-year record ==
Year	Record	Finish	Manager	Playoffs
1925	54-77	8th	Amos Strunk & Clyde Mearkle	
1926	61-68	6th	Glenn Killinger	
1927	62-78	6th	Irvin Trout	
