= New York–Pennsylvania League (1923–1937) =

- Most recent season or competition: 1937 New York-Pennsylvania League season
- Classification: Class A (1933–1937); Class B (1923–1932)
- Sport: Baseball
- Founded: 1923; 103 years ago
- Folded: 1937; 89 years ago
- Replaced by: Eastern League (1938–present)
- No. of teams: 22 (total)
- Country: United States
- Last champion: Elmira Pioneers (1)
- Most titles: Tie (3 each): Williamsport Grays; Harrisburg Senators; Binghamton Triplets

The New York–Pennsylvania League of 1923 through 1937 was an American minor league baseball circuit, the forerunner to the modern Double-A Eastern League.

== History ==
The New York–Pennsylvania League (NY–PL) began in 1923 as Class B circuit and operated at that level through 1932. It then upgraded to Class A for the final five seasons of its existence. When Hartford, Connecticut, entered the loop in 1938, the NY–PL adopted the Eastern League name, and has used that identity since (except for 2021, when it was known as the Double-A Northeast). Previous editions of the Eastern League had existed from 1883–1886, 1892–1911 and 1916–1932. The second incarnation of the Eastern League changed its name in 1912 to the current International League.

The NY–PL's longest-tenured franchises during the 1923–1937 period included Binghamton, a New York Yankees affiliate, Elmira, Scranton, Wilkes-Barre and Williamsport, all of which were members for the league's 15-year existence.

The NY–PL of 1923–1937 was the second of three leagues to bear the name:

- The original New York–Pennsylvania League played for one season, 1891.
- In 1957, the Pennsylvania–Ontario–New York League (PONY League) changed its name to the New York–Penn League and operated under that identity until folding in 2020, beginning as a Class D loop and ending as a Class A Short Season league.

== Member teams ==
- Albany Senators
- Allentown Brooks
- Binghamton Triplets
- Elmira Colonels
- Elmira Pioneers
- Elmira Red Birds/Red Wings
- Harrisburg Senators
- Hazleton Mountaineers
- Hazleton Red Sox
- Oneonta Indians
- Reading Keys
- Reading Red Sox
- Scranton Miners
- Shamokin Indians
- Shamokin Shammies
- Syracuse Stars
- Trenton Senators
- Utica Utes
- Wilkes-Barre Barons
- Williamsport Billies
- Williamsport Grays
- York White Roses

== League champions ==
- 1923—Williamsport Billies
- 1924—Williamsport Grays
- 1925—York White Roses
- 1926—Scranton Miners
- 1927—Harrisburg Senators
- 1928—Harrisburg Senators
- 1929—Binghamton Triplets
- 1930—Wilkes-Barre Barons
- 1931—Harrisburg Senators
- 1932—Wilkes-Barre Barons
- 1933—Binghamton Triplets
- 1934—Williamsport Grays
- 1935—Binghamton Triplets
- 1936—Scranton Miners
- 1937—Elmira Pioneers
