= List of Double-A baseball stadiums =

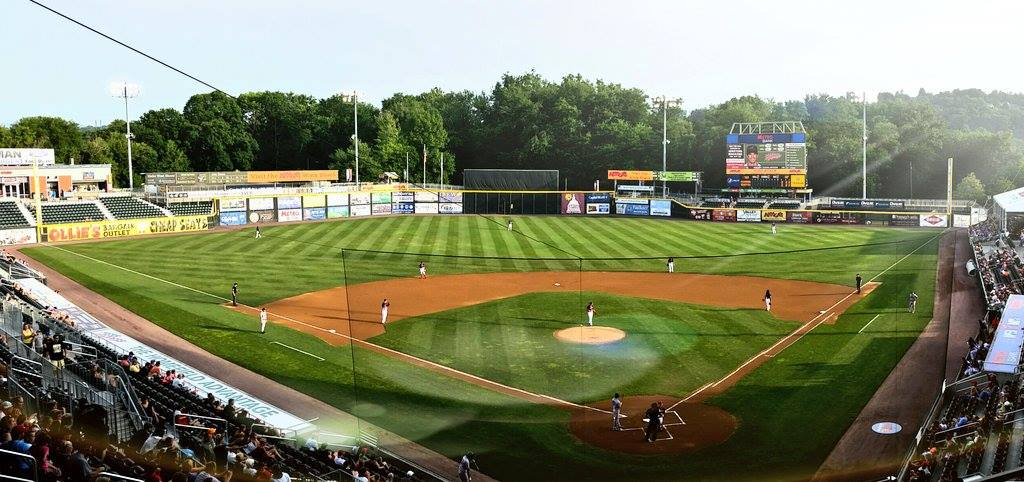
FNB Field opened in 1987 and is the home of the Eastern League's Harrisburg Senators.

There are 30 stadiums in use by Double-A Minor League Baseball teams. The Eastern League (EL) uses 12 stadiums, the Southern League (SL) uses 8, and the Texas League (TL) uses 10. The oldest stadium is Pinnacle Park (1926) in Columbus, Georgia, which became the home of the SL's Columbus Clingstones in 2025. The newest stadiums for the 2026 season will be CarMax Park in Richmond, Virginia, and Erlanger Park in Chattanooga, Tennessee, respective homes of the EL's Richmond Flying Squirrels and the SL's Chattanooga Lookouts. One stadium was built in each of the 1920s, 1950s and 1980s, eight in the 1990s, eight in the 2000s, six in the 2010s, and five in the 2020s. The highest seating capacity is 10,486 at Route 66 Stadium in Springfield, Missouri, where the TL's Springfield Cardinals play. The lowest capacity is 5,038 at Blue Wahoos Stadium in Pensacola, Florida, where the SL's Pensacola Blue Wahoos play.

== Stadiums ==
=== Eastern League ===
Name	Team	City	State	Opened	Capacity	Ref.
7 17 Credit Union Park	Akron RubberDucks	Akron	Ohio	1997	7,630	
CarMax Park	Richmond Flying Squirrels	Richmond	Virginia	2026	10,000	
Dunkin' Park	Hartford Yard Goats	Hartford	Connecticut	2017	6,121	
FirstEnergy Stadium	Reading Fightin Phils	Reading	Pennsylvania	1951	9,000	
FNB Field	Harrisburg Senators	Harrisburg	Pennsylvania	1987	6,187	
Delta Dental Park at Hadlock Field	Portland Sea Dogs	Portland	Maine	1994	7,368	
Mirabito Stadium	Binghamton Rumble Ponies	Binghamton	New York	1992	6,012	
Delta Dental Stadium	New Hampshire Fisher Cats	Manchester	New Hampshire	2005	6,500	
Peoples Natural Gas Field	Altoona Curve	Altoona	Pennsylvania	1999	7,210	
Prince George's Stadium	Chesapeake Baysox	Bowie	Maryland	1994	10,000	
TD Bank Ballpark	Somerset Patriots	Bridgewater	New Jersey	1999	6,100	
UPMC Park	Erie SeaWolves	Erie	Pennsylvania	1995	6,000	

=== Southern League ===
Name	Team	City	State	Opened	Capacity	Ref.
Erlanger Park	Chattanooga Lookouts	Chattanooga	Tennessee	2026	8,032	
Blue Wahoos Stadium	Pensacola Blue Wahoos	Pensacola	Florida	2012	5,038	
Covenant Health Park	Knoxville Smokies	Knoxville	Tennessee	2025	6,355	
Keesler Federal Park	Biloxi Shuckers	Biloxi	Mississippi	2015	6,076	
Dabos Park	Montgomery Biscuits	Montgomery	Alabama	2004	7,000	
Regions Field	Birmingham Barons	Birmingham	Alabama	2013	8,500	
Pinnacle Park	Columbus Clingstones	Columbus	Georgia	1926	5,500	
Toyota Field	Rocket City Trash Pandas	Madison	Alabama	2020	7,000	

=== Texas League ===
Name	Team	City	State	Opened	Capacity	Ref.
Arvest Ballpark	Northwest Arkansas Naturals	Springdale	Arkansas	2008	7,305	
Dickey–Stephens Park	Arkansas Travelers	North Little Rock	Arkansas	2007	7,200	
Route 66 Stadium	Ozarks Springbirds	Springfield	Missouri	2004	10,486	
Hodgetown	Amarillo Sod Poodles	Amarillo	Texas	2019	6,631	
Momentum Bank Ballpark	Midland RockHounds	Midland	Texas	2002	6,669	
Nelson W. Wolff Municipal Stadium	San Antonio Missions	San Antonio	Texas	1994	9,200	
ONEOK Field	Tulsa Drillers	Tulsa	Oklahoma	2010	7,833	
Riders Field	Frisco RoughRiders	Frisco	Texas	2003	10,316	
Equity Bank Park	Wichita Turbo Tubs	Wichita	Kansas	2020	10,000	
Whataburger Field	Corpus Christi Hooks	Corpus Christi	Texas	2005	7,050	

== Map ==
Current Double-A stadium locations:
- Eastern League
- Southern League
- Texas League

== Gallery ==
=== Eastern League ===
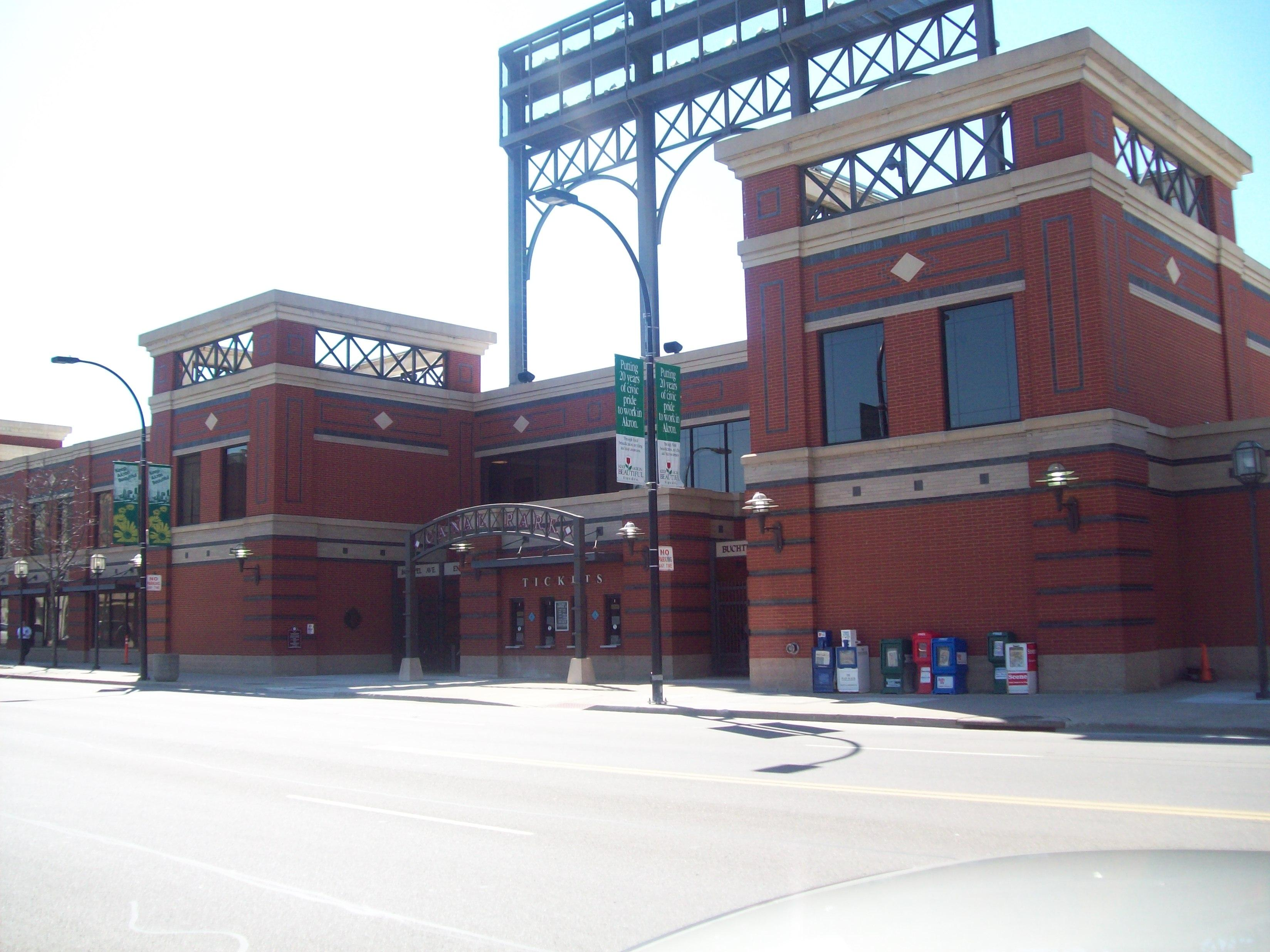
7 17 Credit Union Park (Akron RubberDucks)

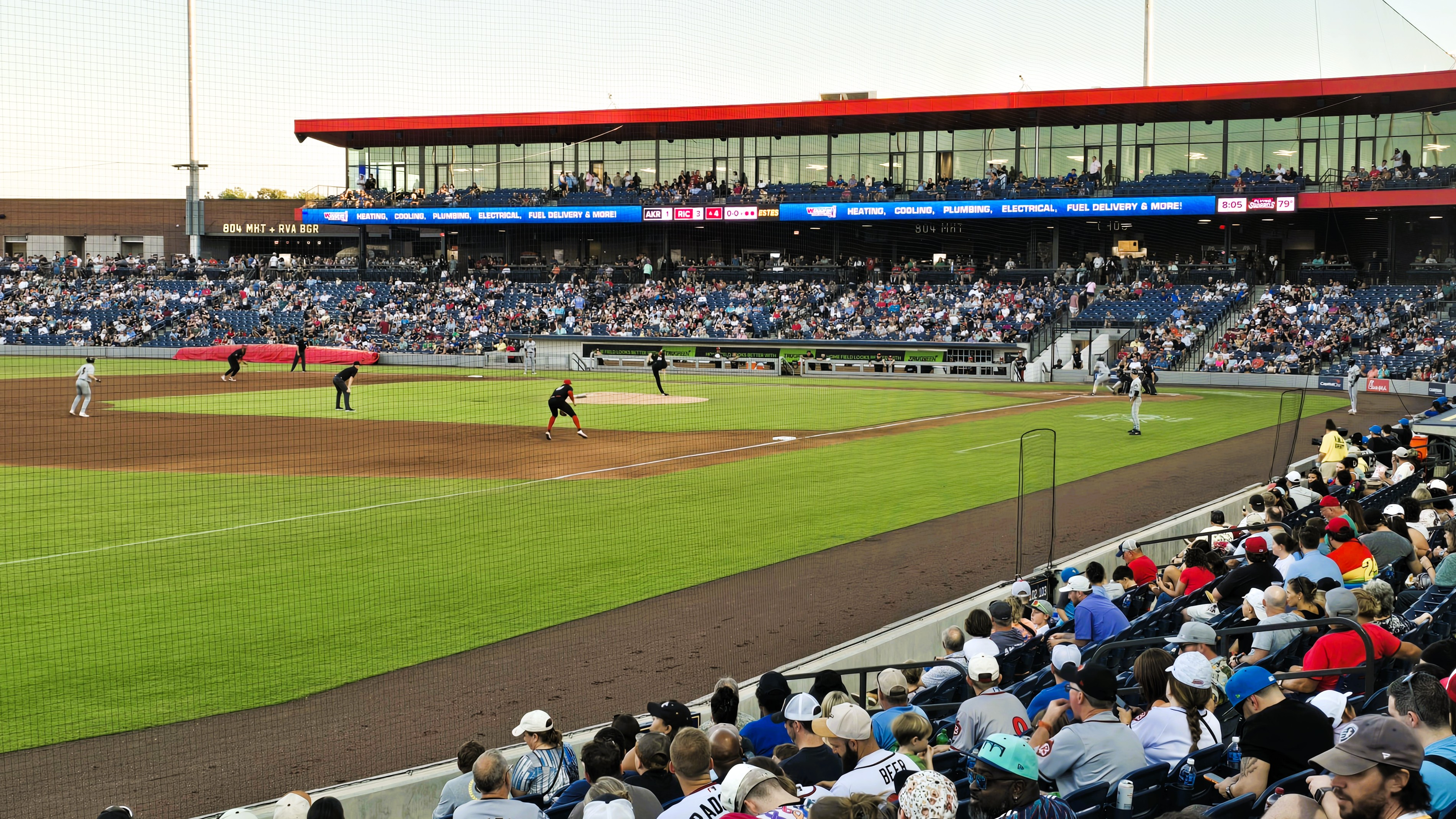
CarMax Park (Richmond Flying Squirrels)

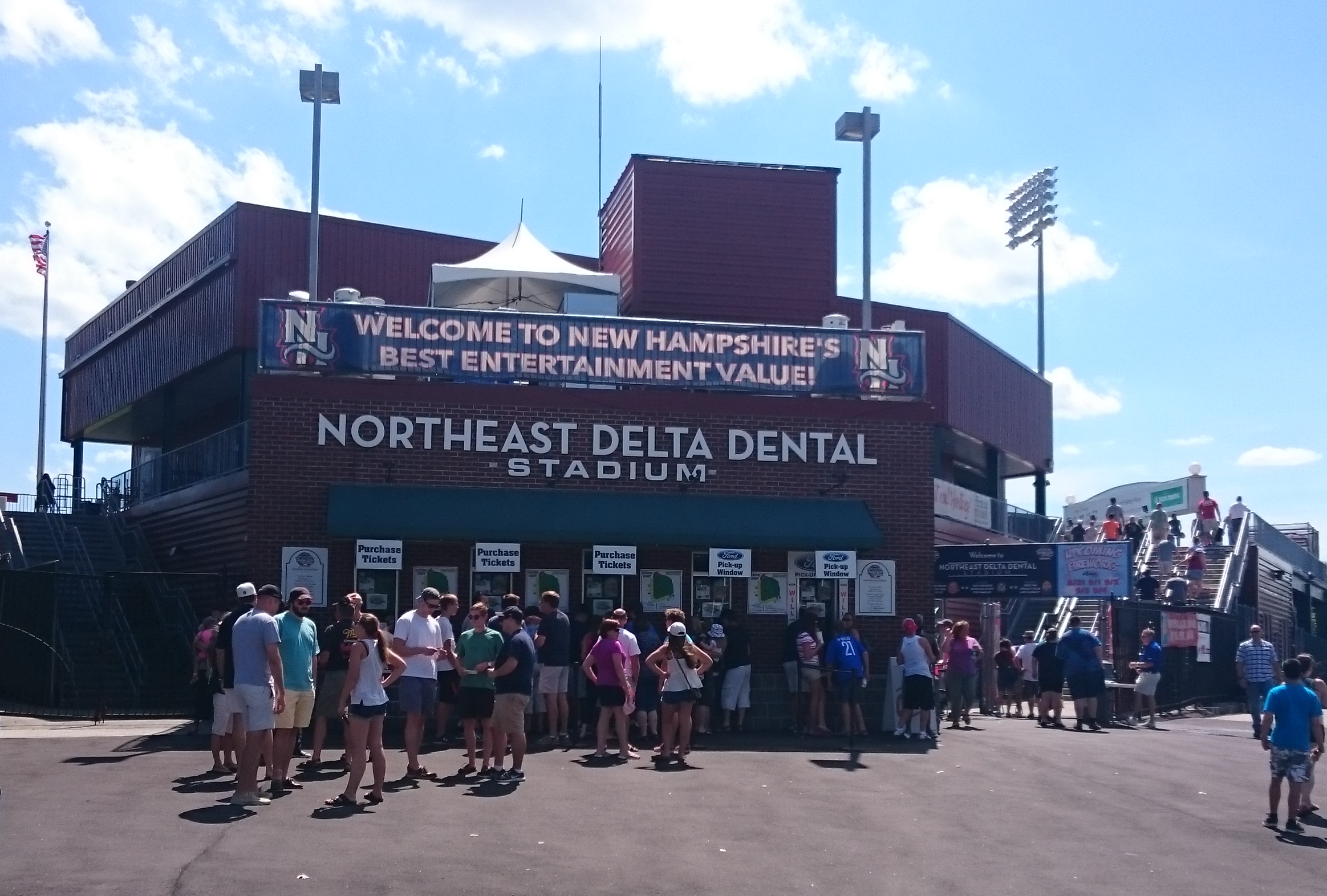
Delta Dental Stadium (New Hampshire Fisher Cats)

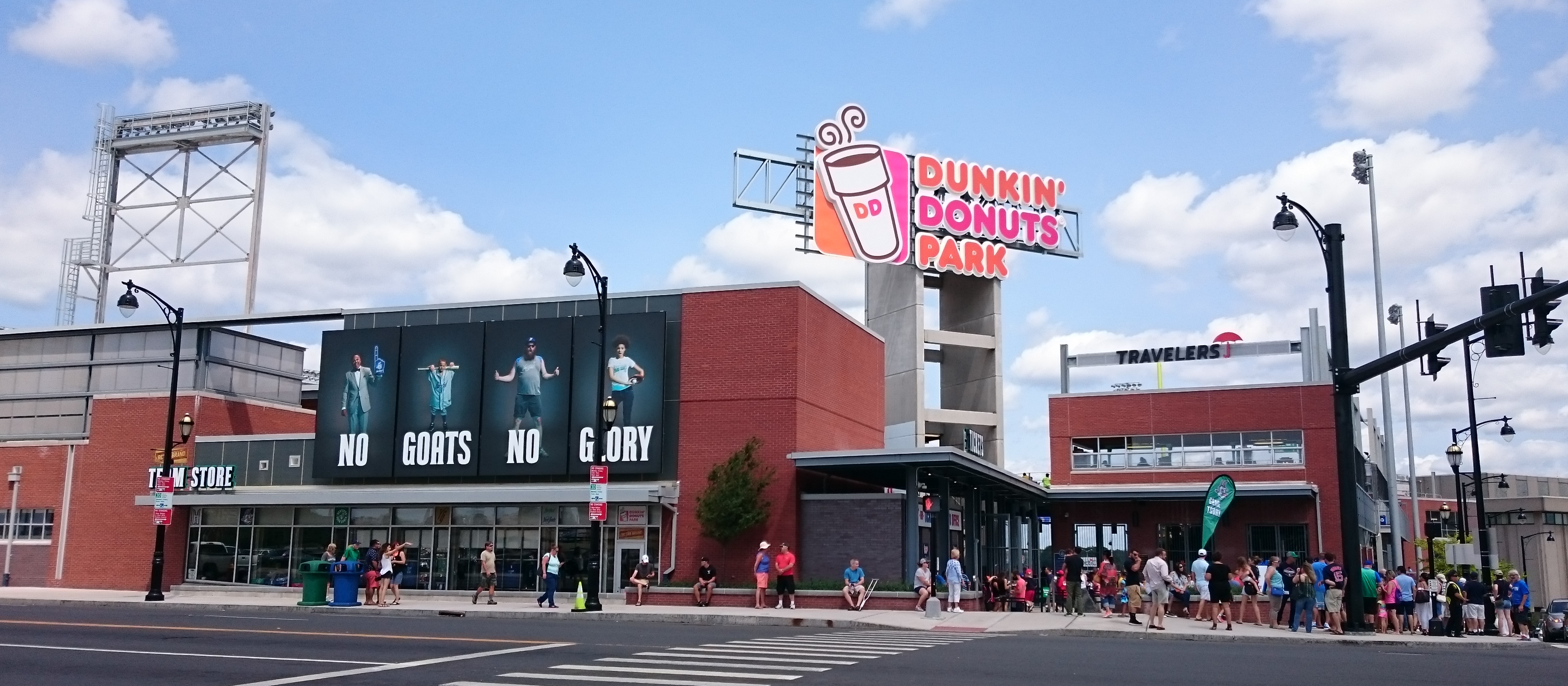
Dunkin' Park (Hartford Yard Goats)

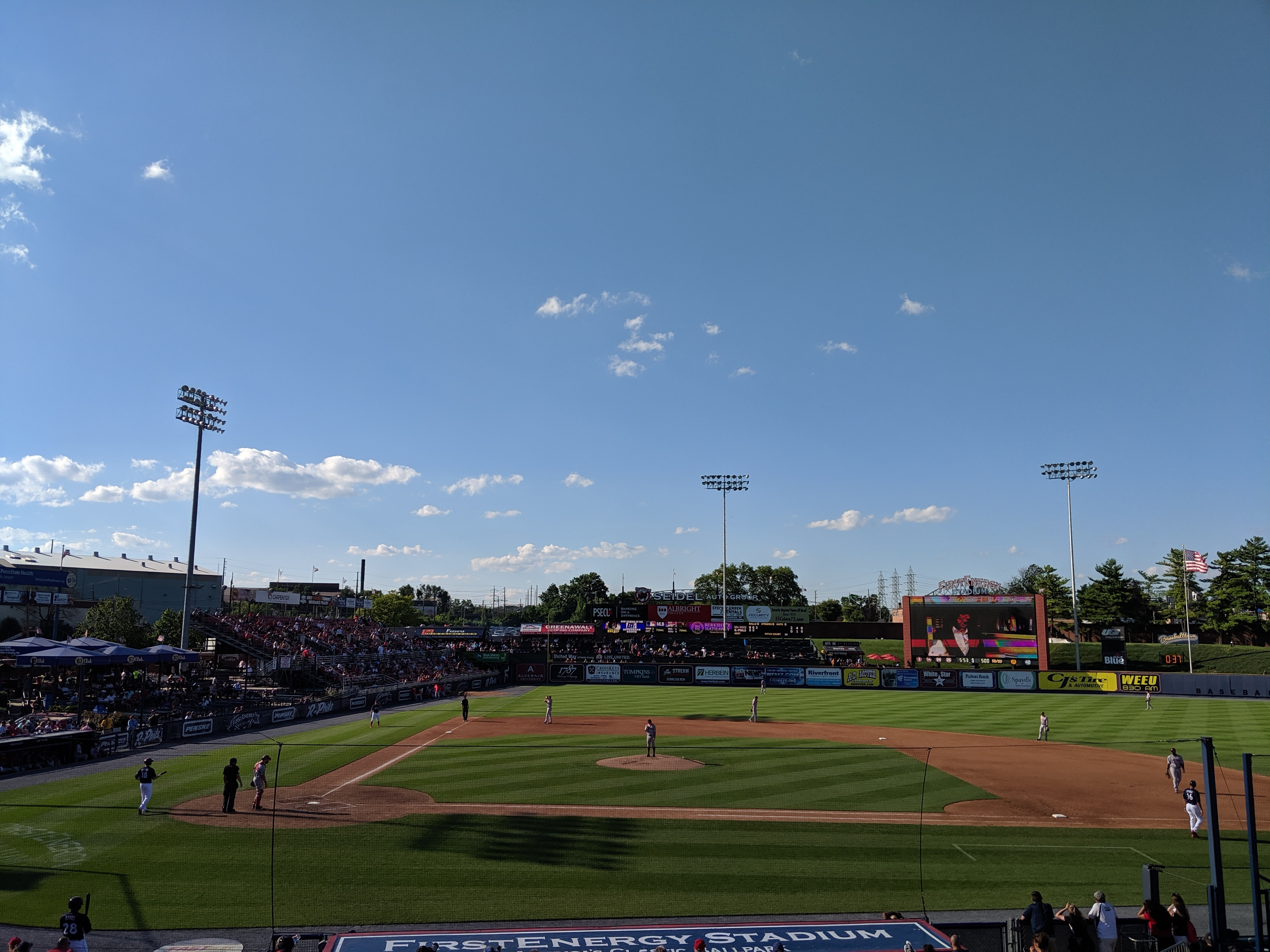
FirstEnergy Stadium (Reading Fightin Phils)

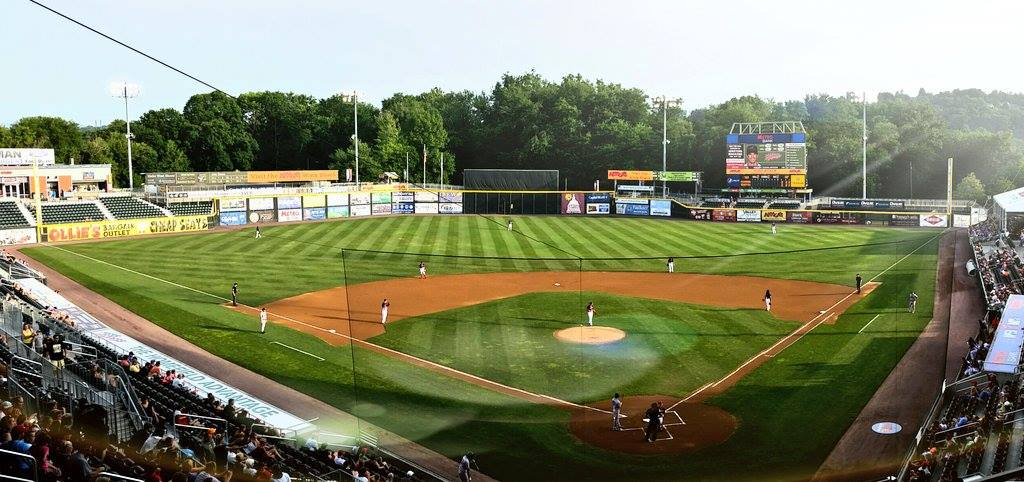
FNB Field (Harrisburg Senators)

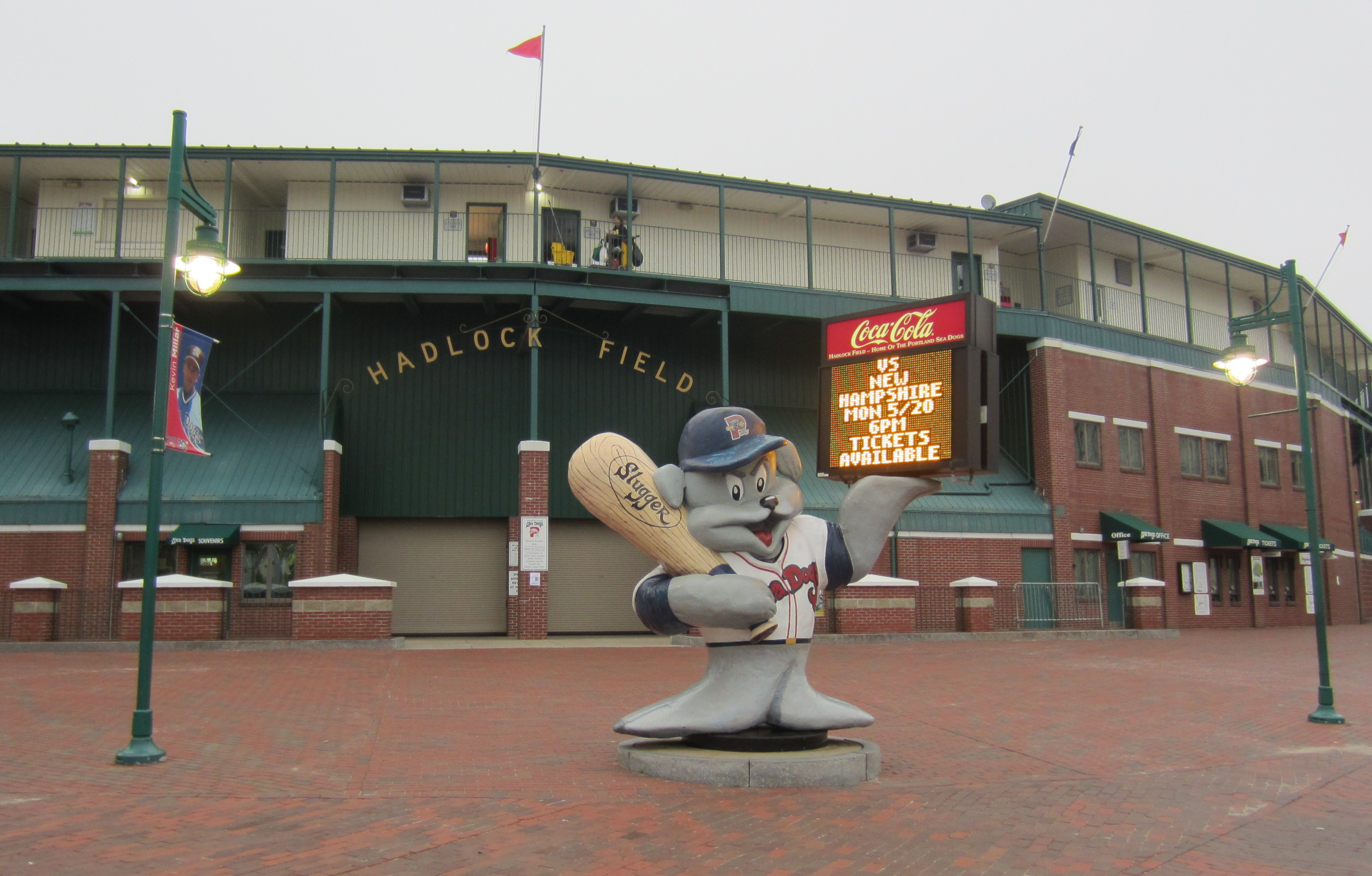
Hadlock Field (Portland Sea Dogs)

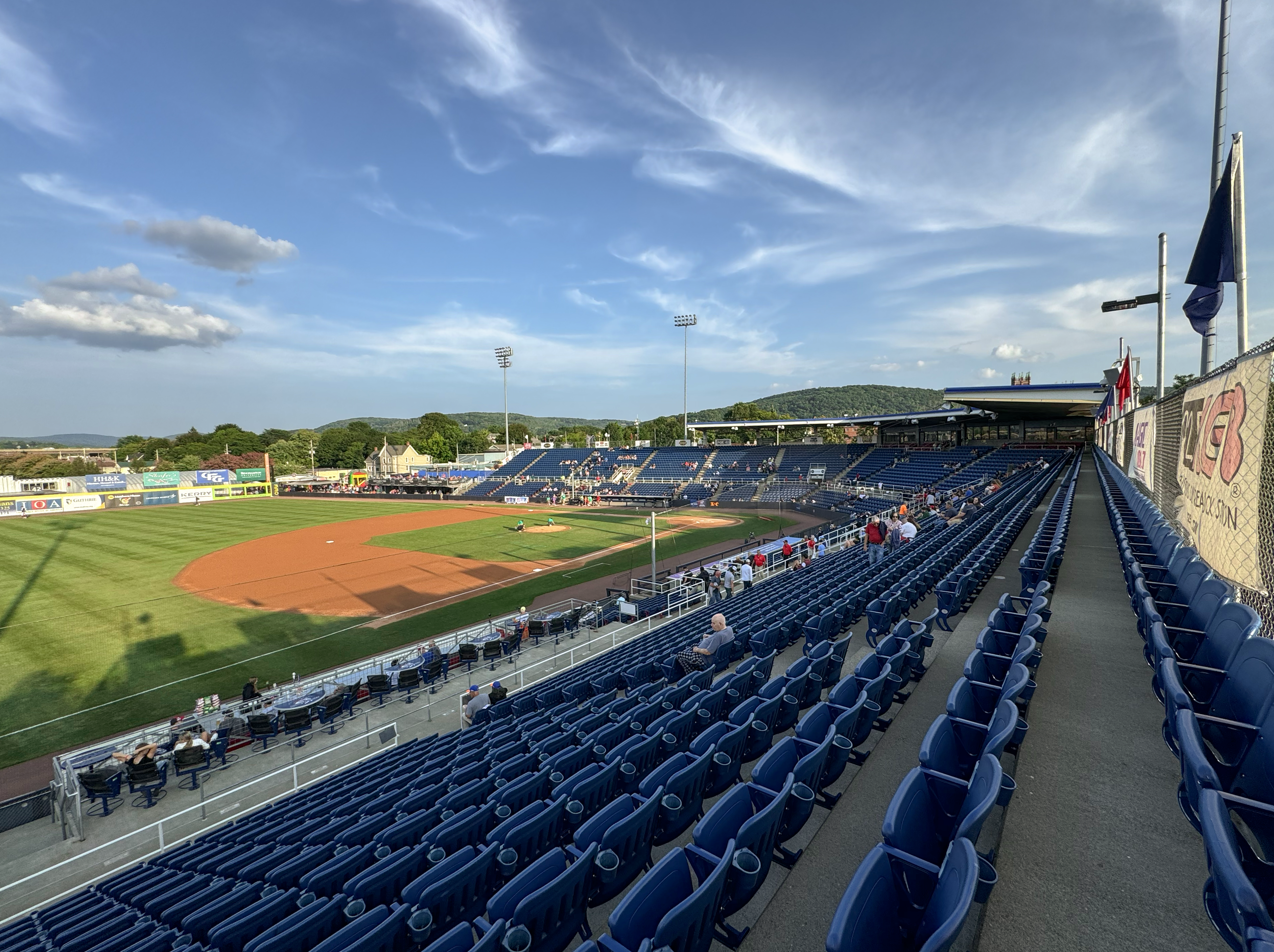
Mirabito Stadium (Binghamton Rumble Ponies)

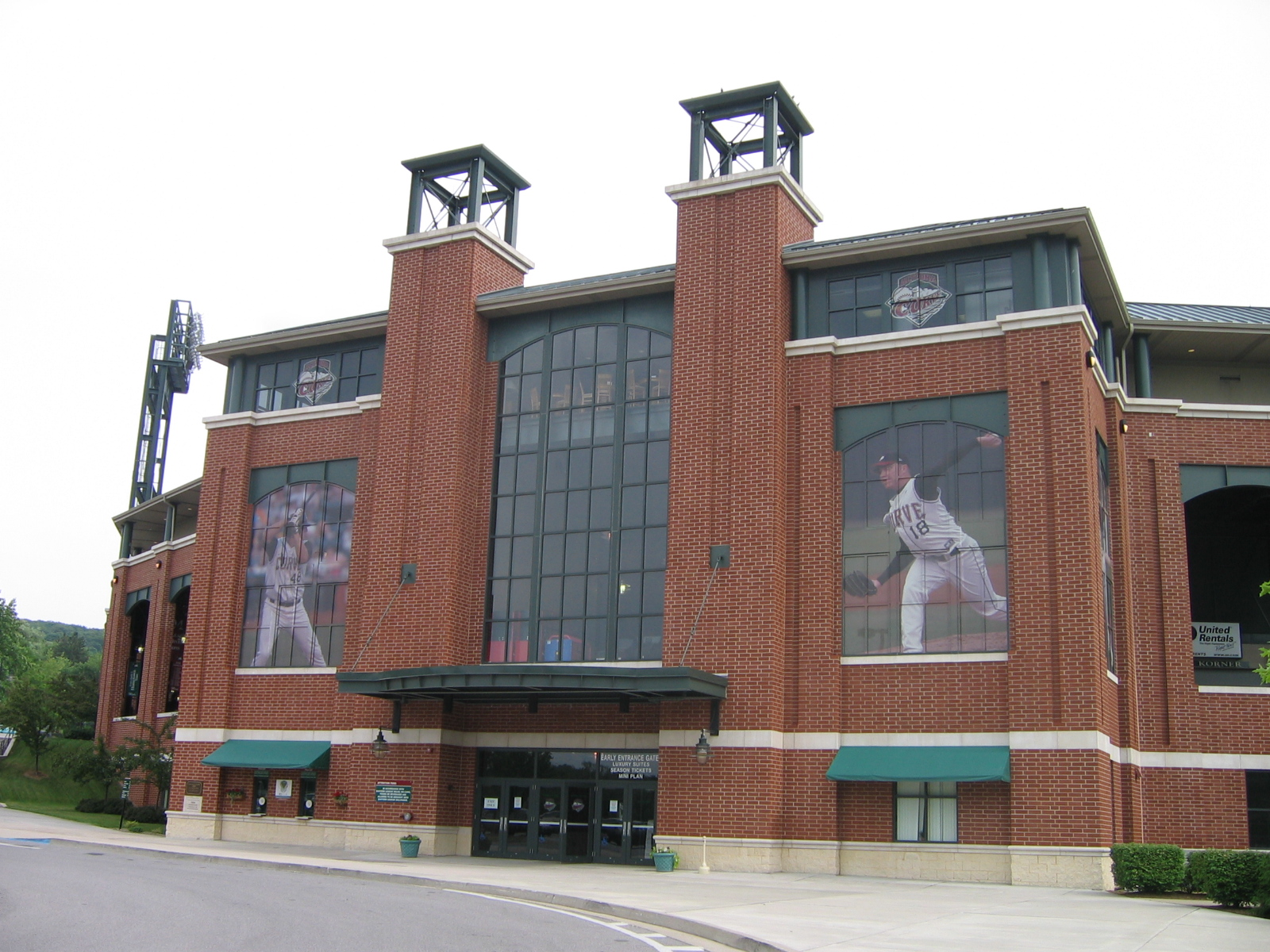
Peoples Natural Gas Field (Altoona Curve)

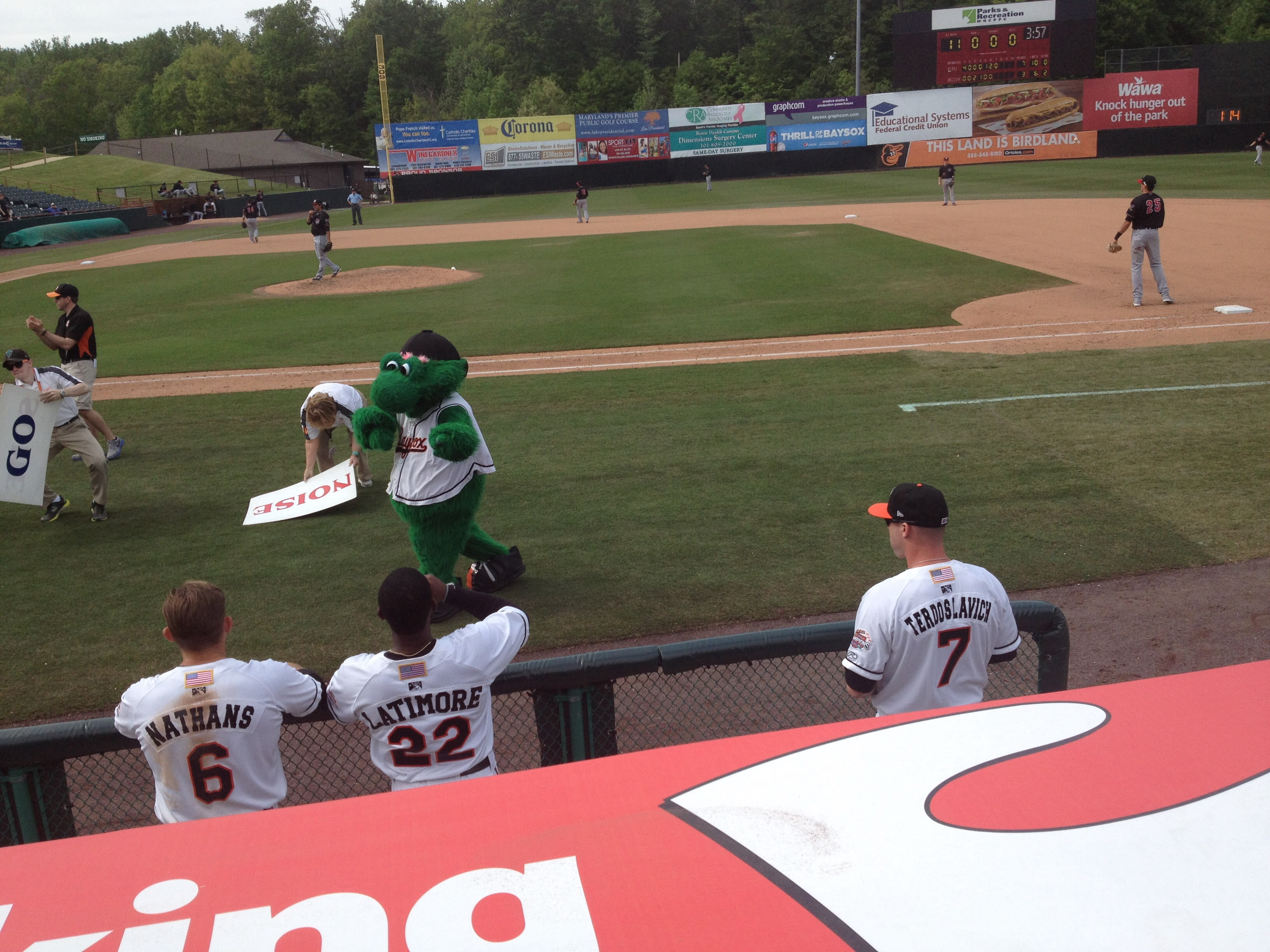
Prince George's Stadium (Chesapeake Baysox)

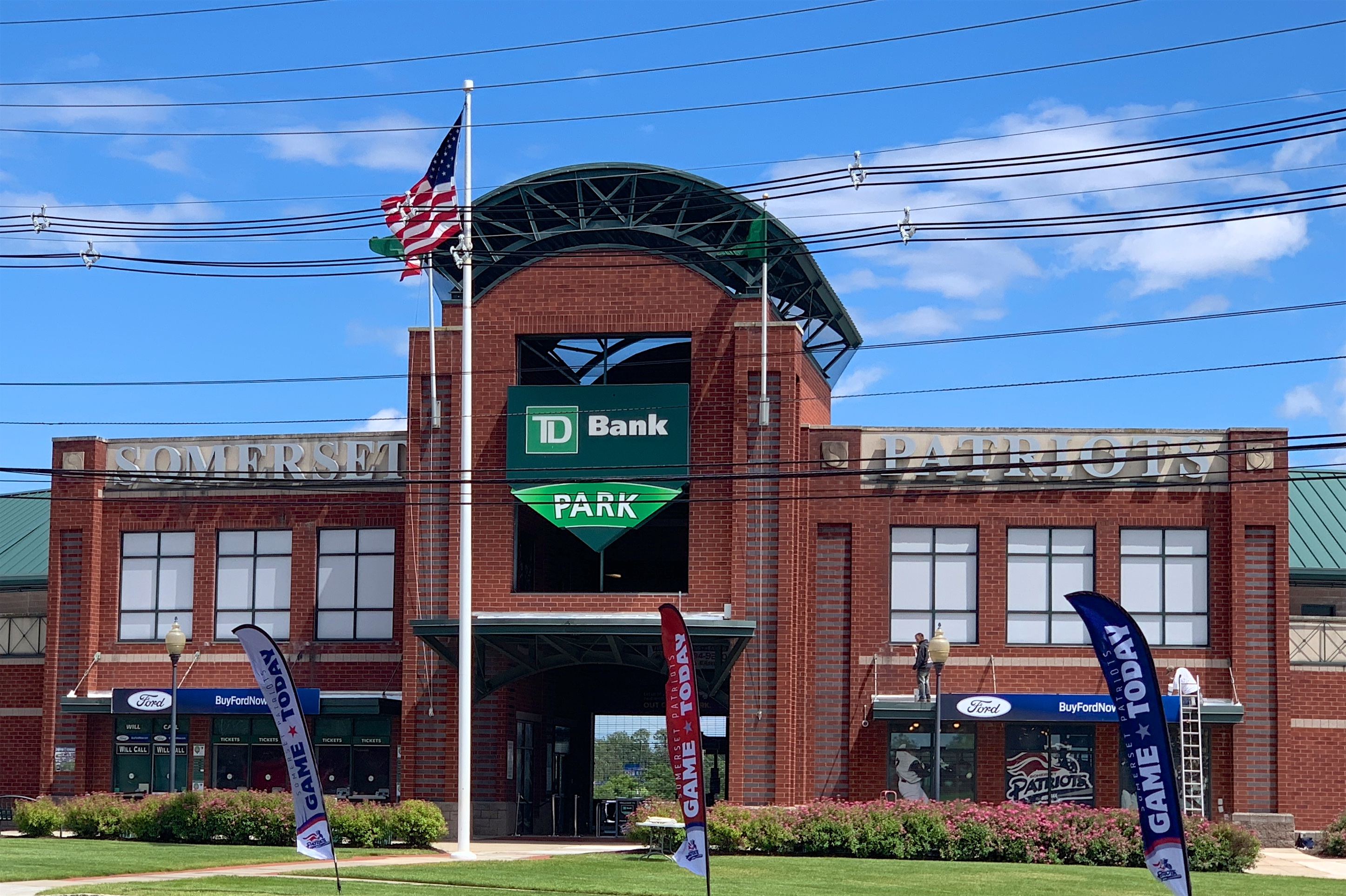
TD Bank Ballpark (Somerset Patriots)

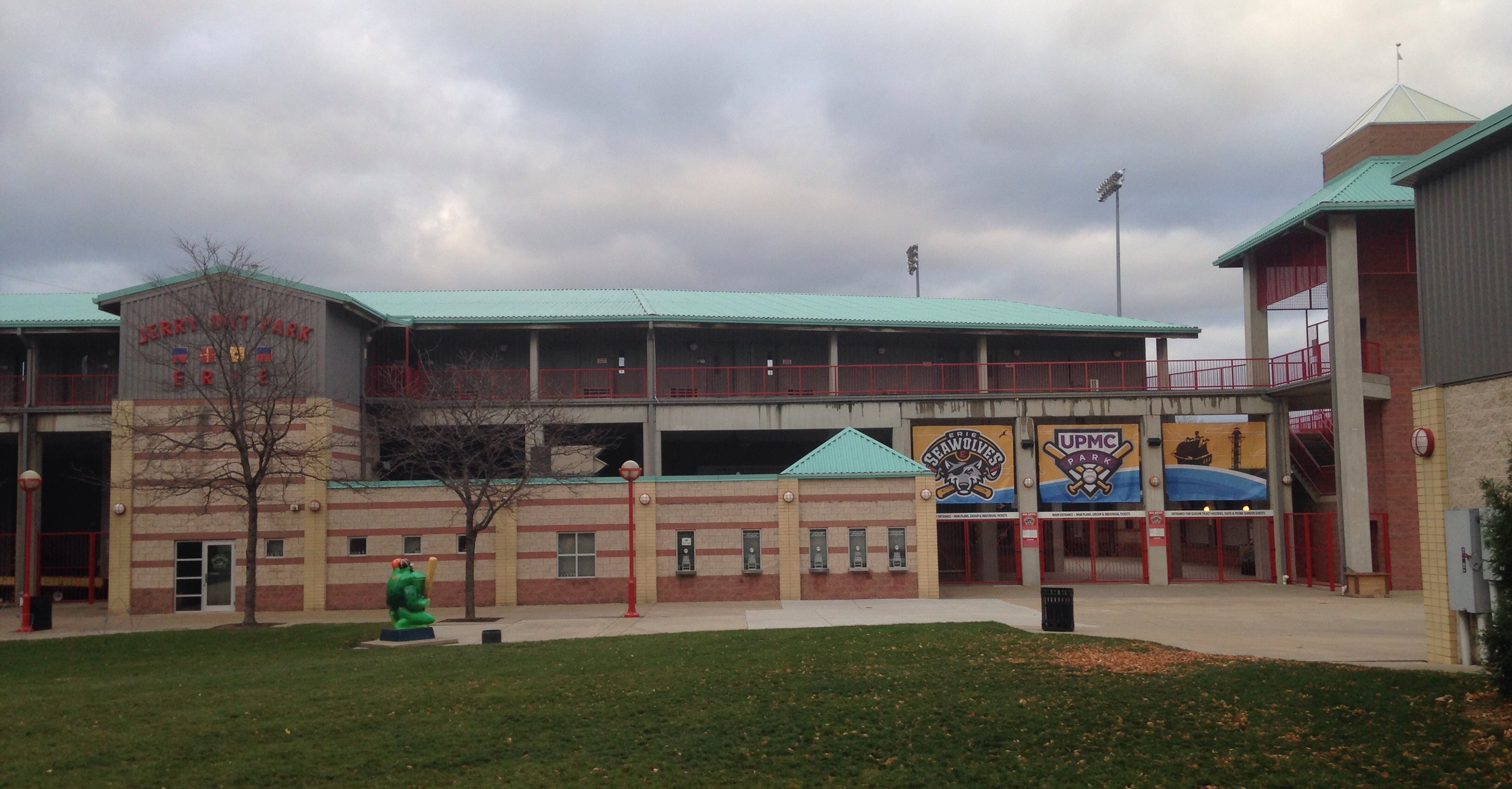
UPMC Park (Erie SeaWolves)

=== Southern League ===
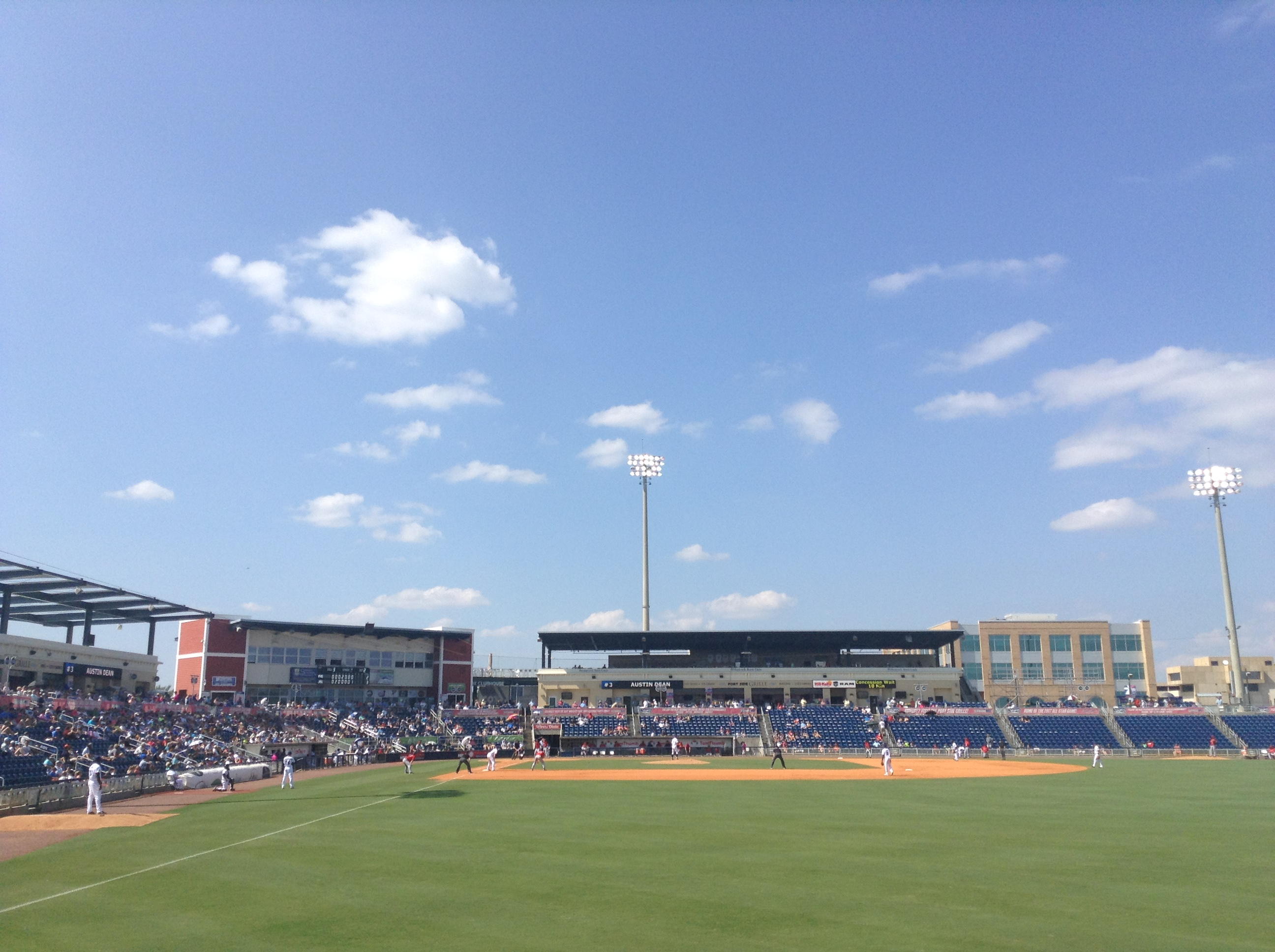
Blue Wahoos Stadium (Pensacola Blue Wahoos)

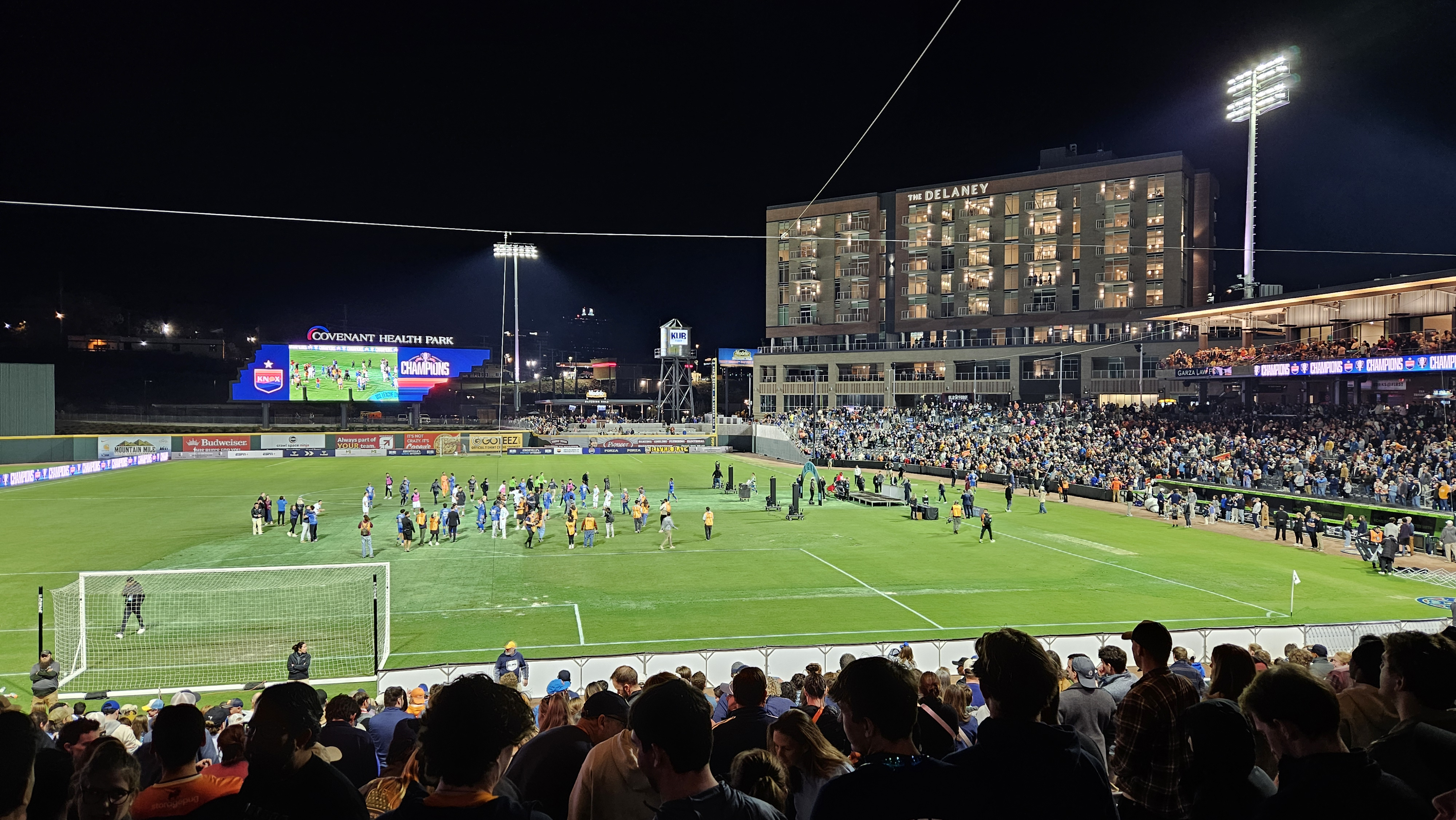
Covenant Health Park (Knoxville Smokies)

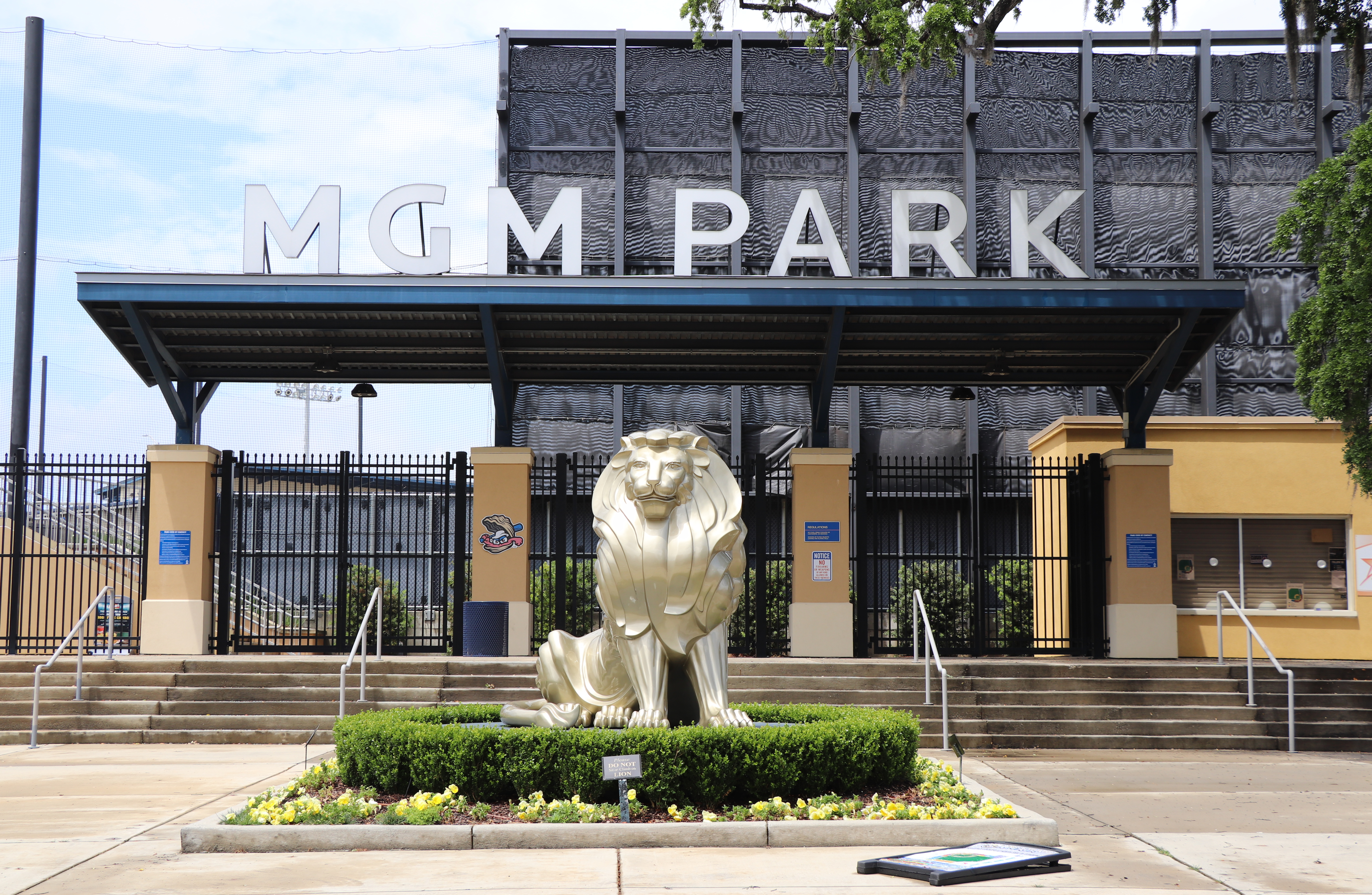
Keesler Federal Park (Biloxi Shuckers)

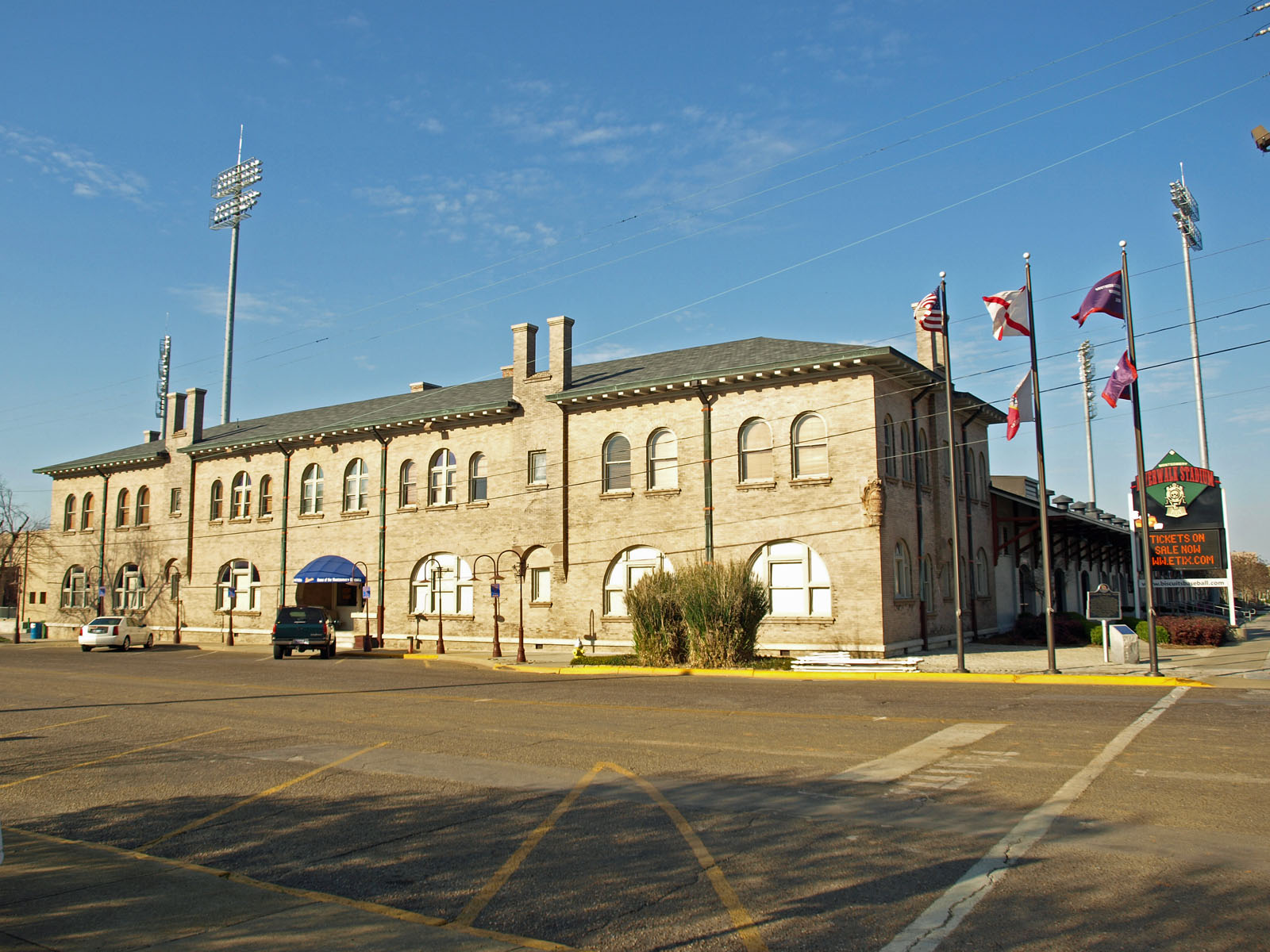
Dabos Park (Montgomery Biscuits)

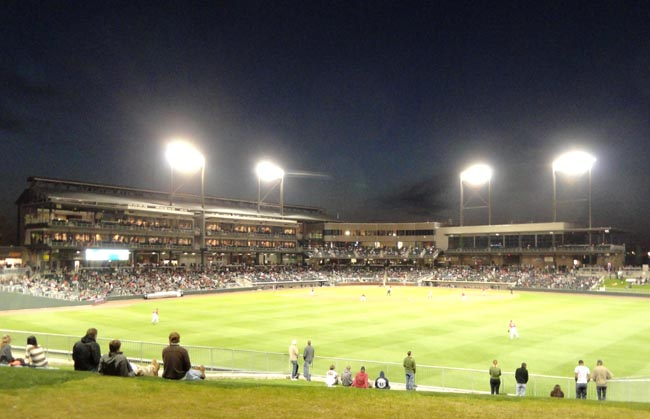
Regions Field (Birmingham Barons)

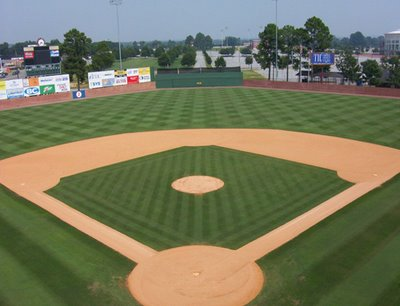
Pinnacle Park (Columbus Clingstones)

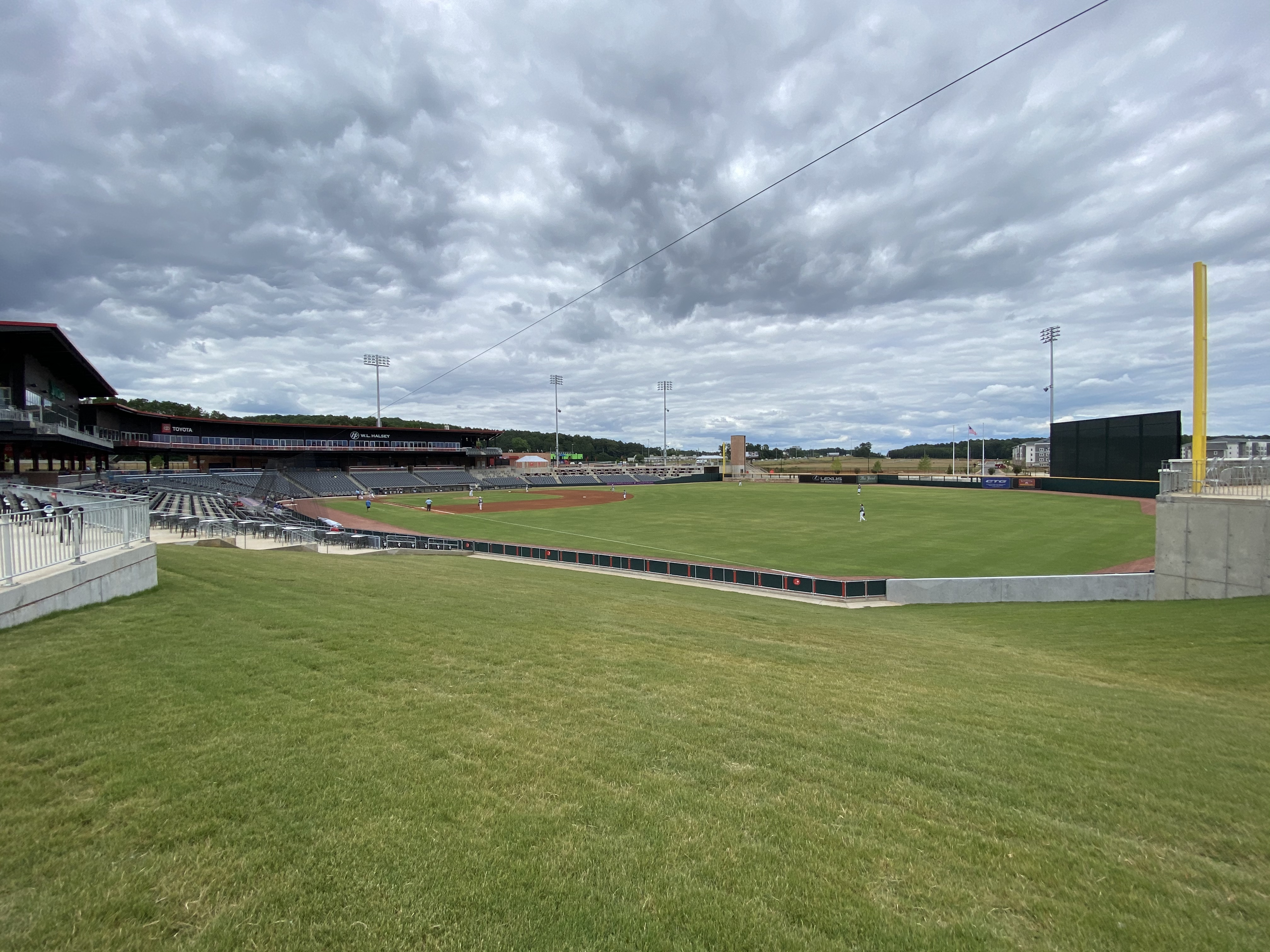
Toyota Field (Rocket City Trash Pandas)

=== Texas League ===
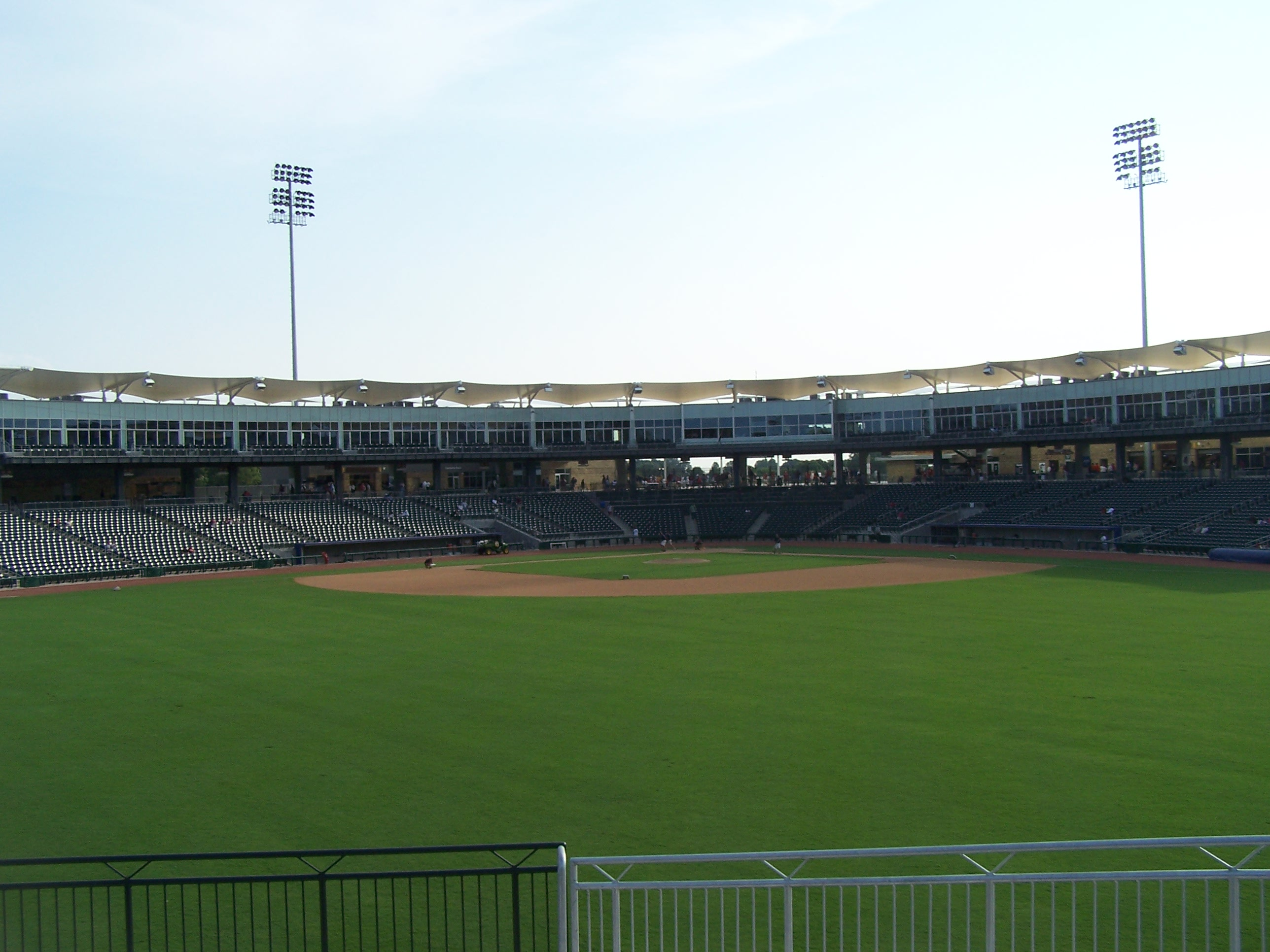
Arvest Ballpark (Northwest Arkansas Naturals)

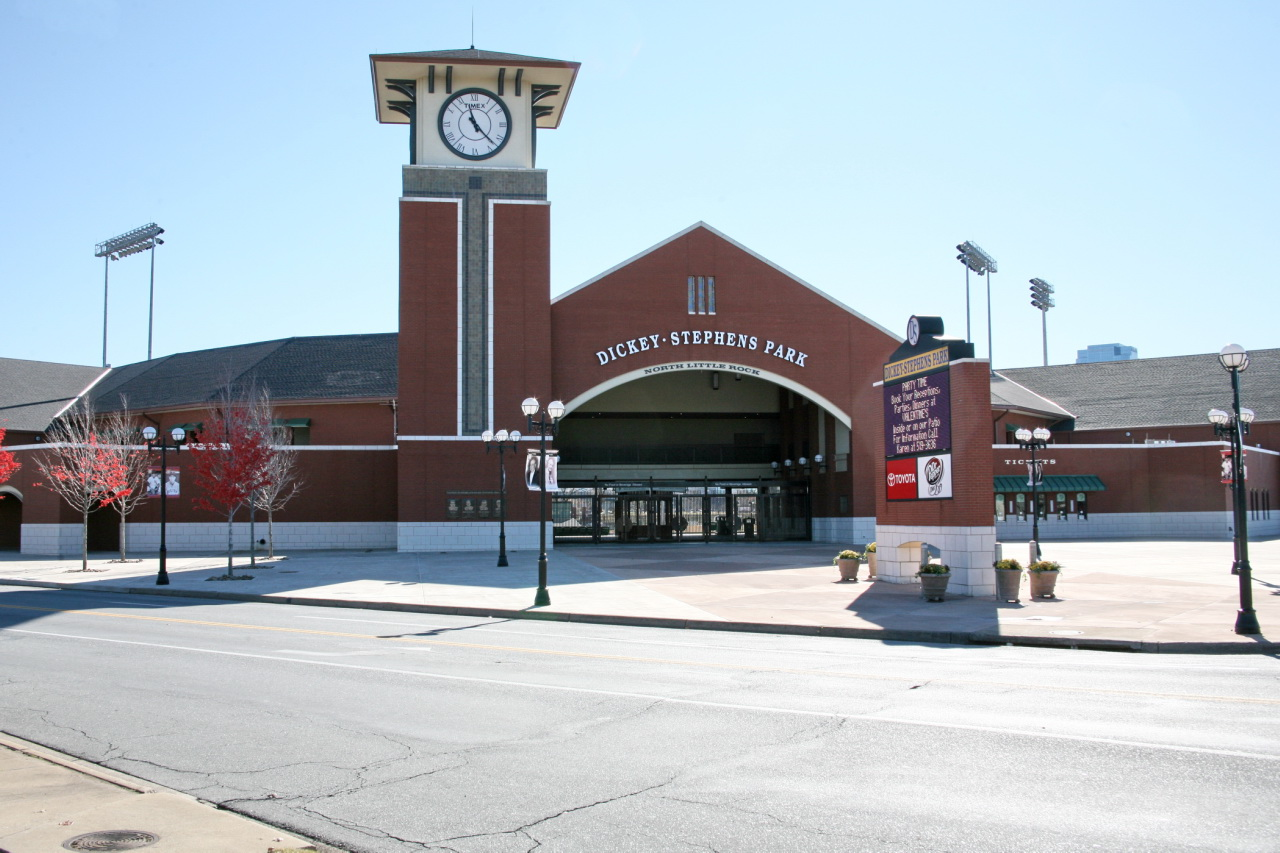
Dickey–Stephens Park (Arkansas Travelers)

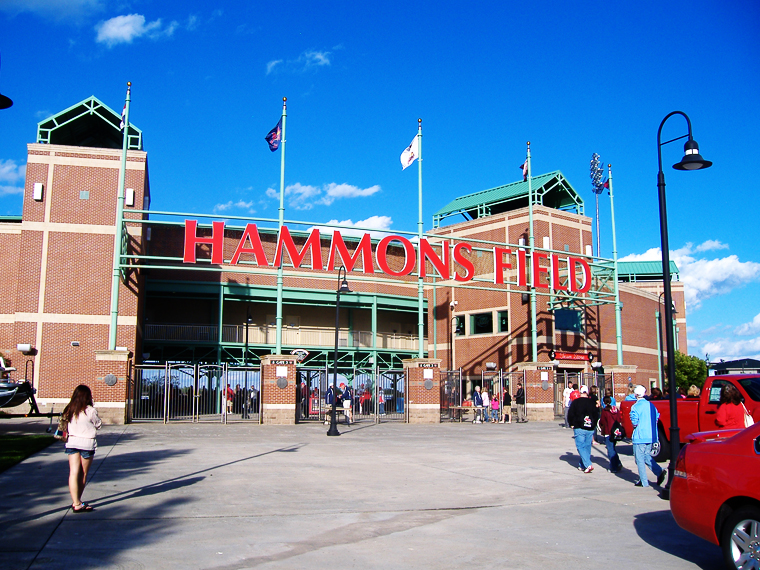
Route 66 Stadium (Ozarks Springbirds)

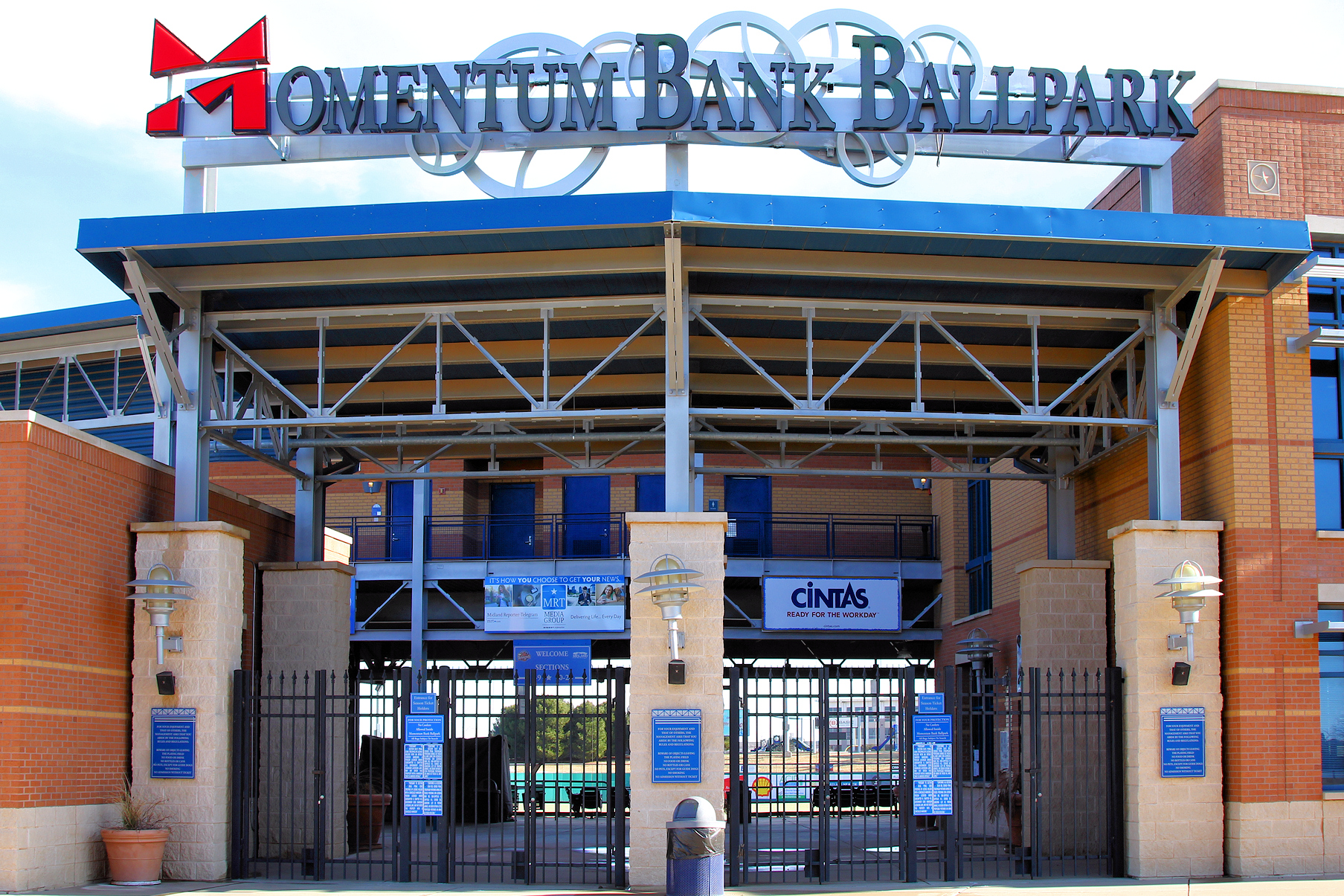
Momentum Bank Ballpark (Midland RockHounds)

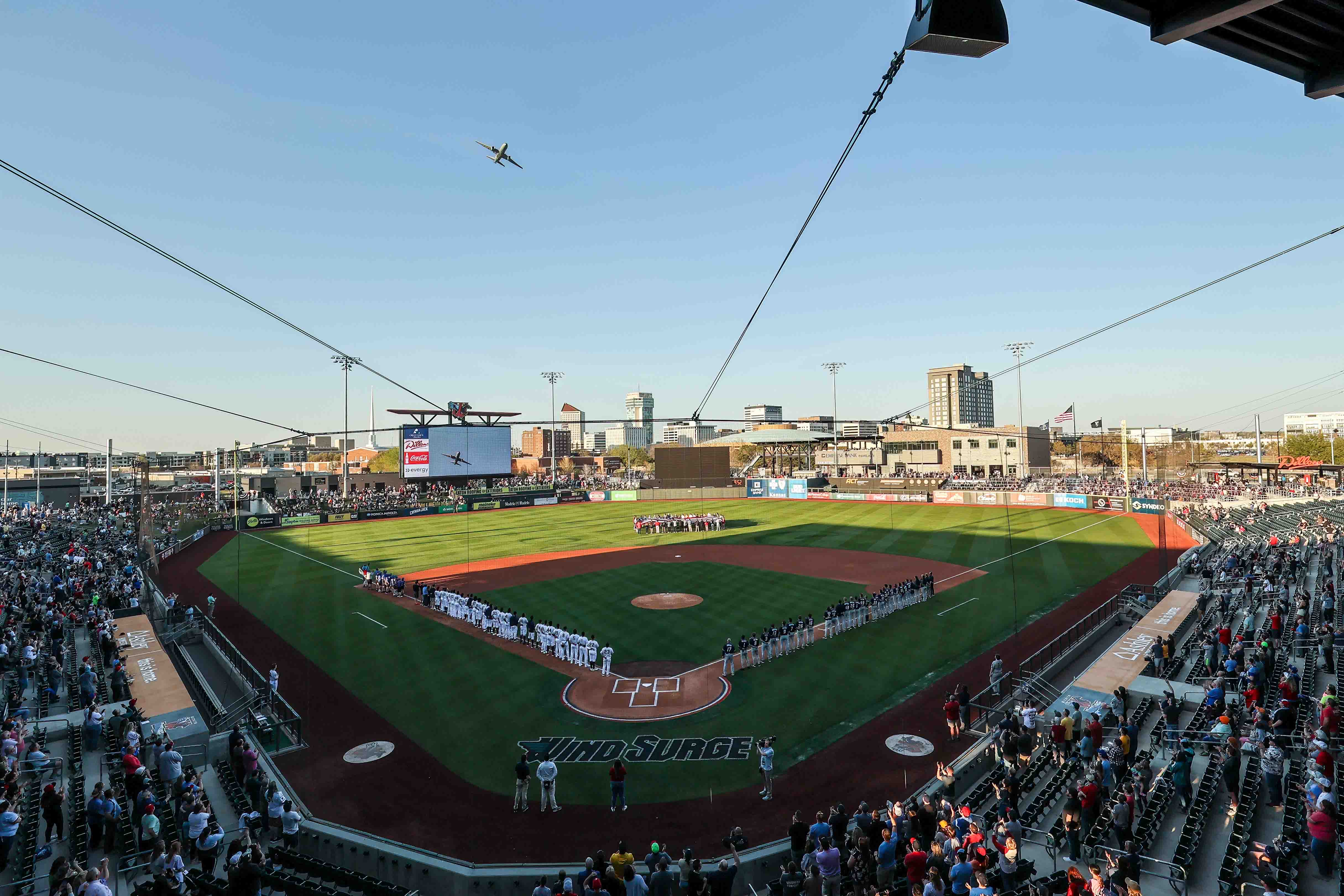
Equity Bank Park (Wichita Turbo Tubs)

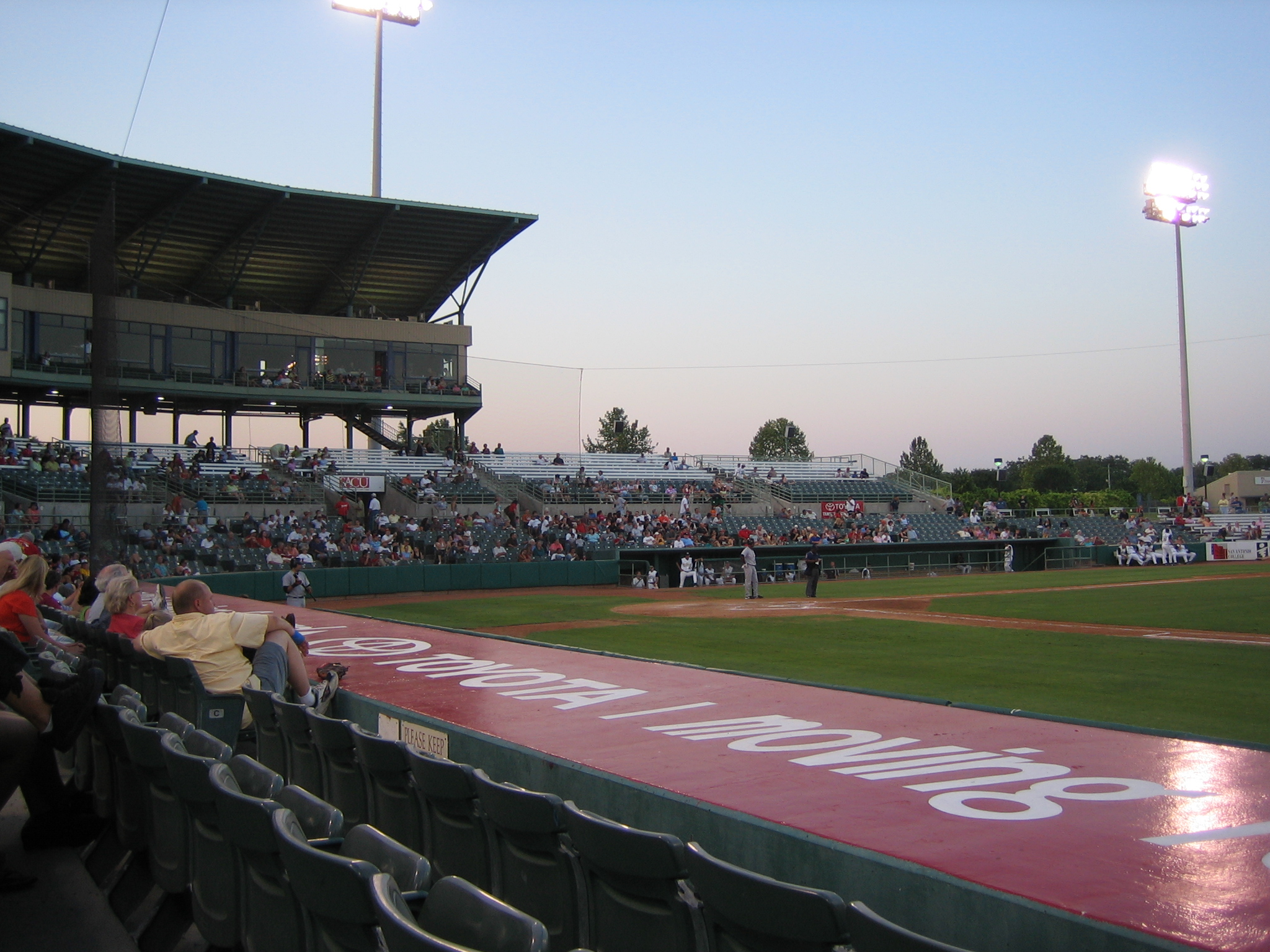
Nelson W. Wolff Municipal Stadium (San Antonio Missions)

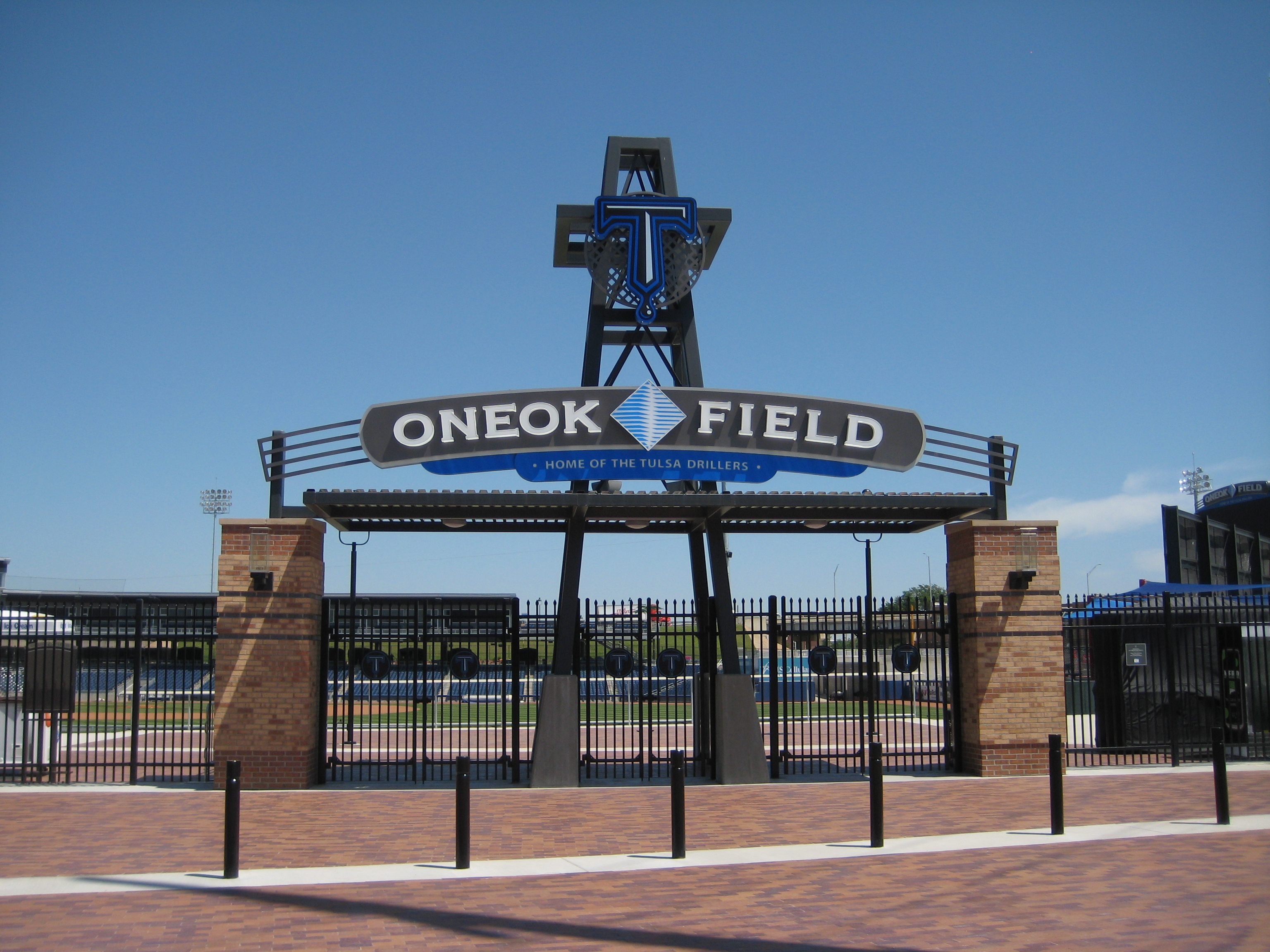
ONEOK Field (Tulsa Drillers)

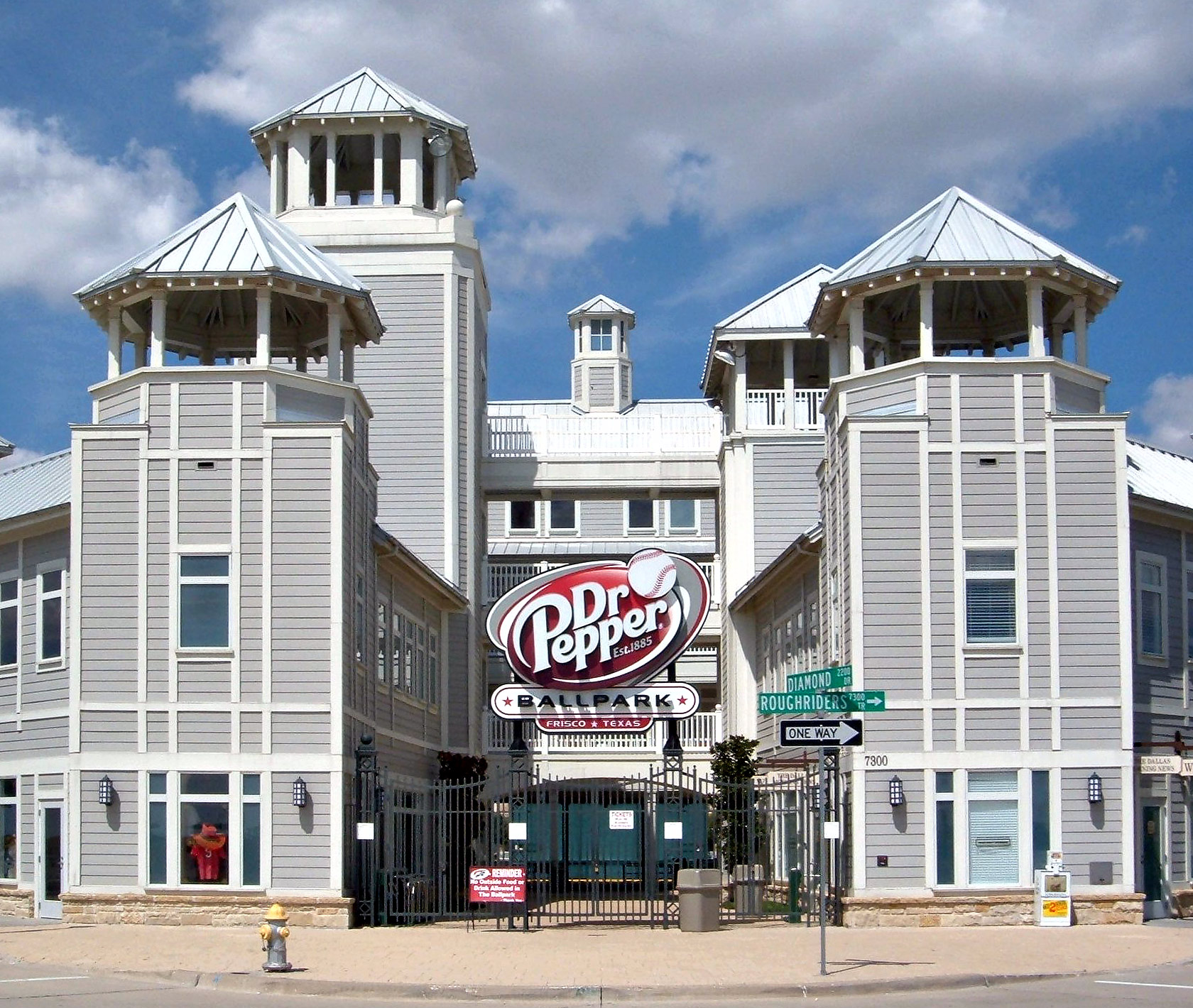
Riders Field (Frisco RoughRiders)

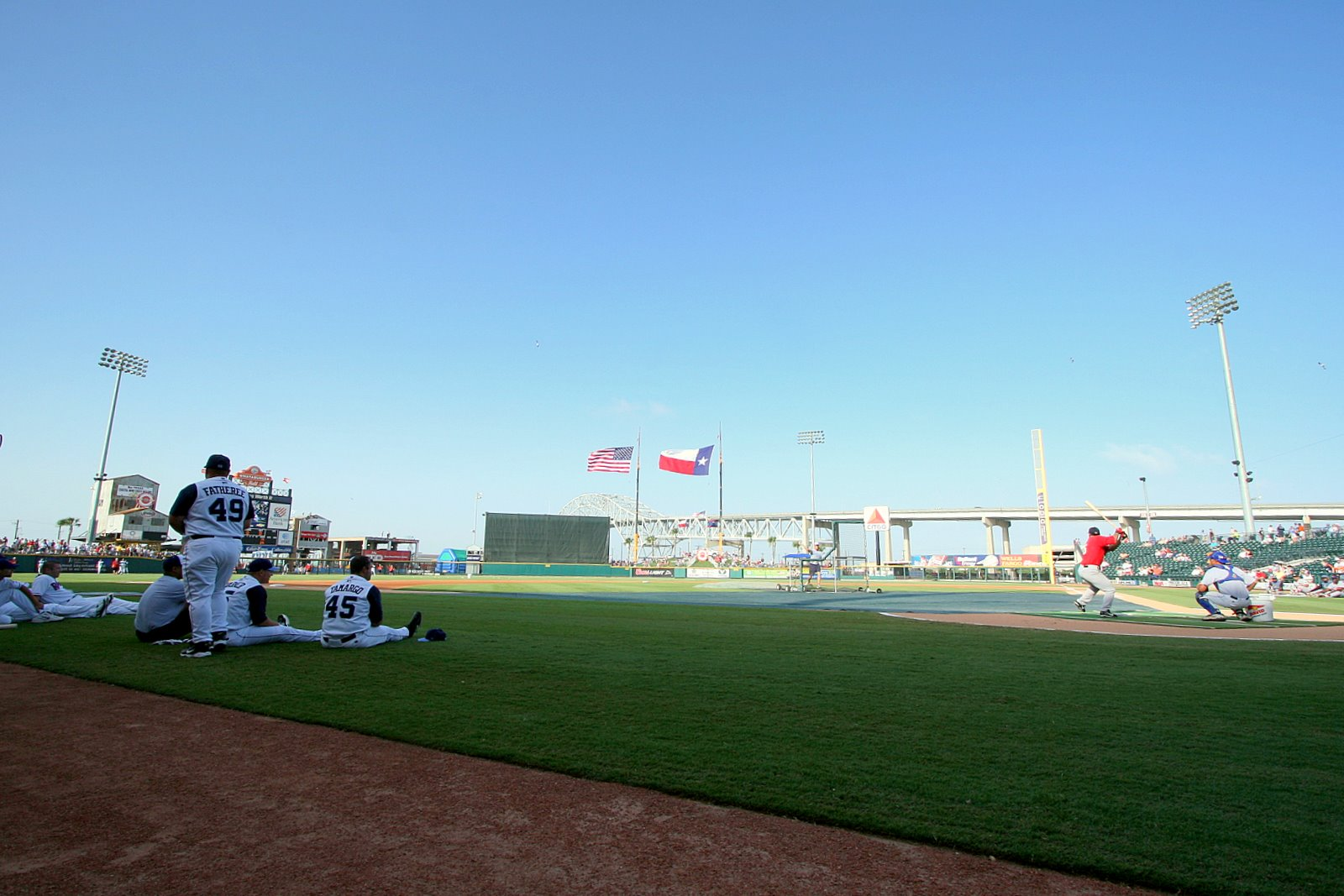
Whataburger Field (Corpus Christi Hooks)

== See also ==
- List of Major League Baseball stadiums
- List of Triple-A baseball stadiums
- List of High-A baseball stadiums
- List of Single-A baseball stadiums
- List of Rookie baseball stadiums

== General reference ==
- "Get to know the teams in the Double-A Northeast". MiLB.com. April 14, 2021.
- "Get to know the teams in the Double-A South". MiLB.com. April 14, 2021.
- "Get to know the teams in the Double-A Central". MiLB.com. April 14, 2021.
