= New Orleans Baby Cakes =

- 1993–2019; Metairie, Louisiana
Team logo
Cap insignia

Minor league affiliations
- Class: Triple-A (1993–2019)
- League: Pacific Coast League (1998–2019); American Association (1993–1997)

Major league affiliations
- Team: Miami Marlins (2009–2019); New York Mets (2007–2008); Washington Nationals (2005–2006); Houston Astros (1997–2004); Milwaukee Brewers (1993–1996)

Minor league titles
- Class titles (1): 1998
- League titles (2): 1998; 2001
- Conference titles (2): 1998; 2001
- Division titles (3): 1998; 2001; 2007

Team data
- Name: New Orleans Baby Cakes (2017–2019); New Orleans Zephyrs (1993–2016)
- Colors: Dark navy, gold, purple, green, café au lait, white
- Mascots: Boudreaux D. Nutria and Clotile
- Ballpark: Shrine on Airline (1997–2019); Privateer Park (1993–1996)

The New Orleans Baby Cakes (formerly the New Orleans Zephyrs) were a Minor League Baseball team in the Pacific Coast League (PCL) and the Triple-A affiliate of the Miami Marlins. They were located in Metairie, Louisiana, a suburb of New Orleans, and played their home games at the Shrine on Airline.

The team began play in 1993 as a member of the Triple-A American Association (AA) when the Denver Zephyrs moved to New Orleans. They joined the PCL in 1998. New Orleans has qualified for the postseason on three occasions and has won the PCL championship twice as the Triple-A affiliate of the Houston Astros (1998 and 2001).

At the end of the 2019 season, the team moved to Wichita, Kansas, where they continue as the Wichita Wind Surge. Initially, the city of New Orleans hoped to bring a Double-A Southern League team to the city and continue operations as the Baby Cakes. However, due to Major League Baseball's reorganization of Minor League Baseball, the campaign ultimately failed.

== History ==
Professional baseball was first played in New Orleans in the late 19th century. The city's longest-running team was the New Orleans Pelicans who played off and on from 1887 to 1977 primarily in the Southern Association. The Pelicans left after the 1977 season, and the city went without a pro team until 1993. The New Orleans Zephyrs came to New Orleans by way of Denver, Colorado, in 1993. With the arrival of the Colorado Rockies Major League Baseball expansion team, the city's Denver Zephyrs were forced to move.

Louisiana lawyer and business promoter Robert E. Couhig Jr. led the effort to move the team to New Orleans. The "Zephyr" name was appropriate for New Orleans, too, as the Zephyr Roller Coaster was a popular ride at the Pontchartrain Beach amusement park (which had closed in 1983). The New Orleans Zephyrs remained in the American Association through 1997. The circuit disbanded after the season, and they joined the Pacific Coast League in 1998.

The Zephyrs won the 1998 PCL championship and went on to win the Triple-A World Series against the Buffalo Bisons, 3–1. The Zephyrs were also slated to participate in the 2001 championship series with the Tacoma Rainiers, but the playoffs were cancelled in the wake of the September 11 attacks, and the teams were named co-champions.

The Zephyrs finished out the last portion of their home games for the 2005 Pacific Coast League season three days before Hurricane Katrina hit the City of New Orleans, and though Zephyr Field sustained moderate damage, the team was able to open the 2006 season at home, making them the first professional team in New Orleans to do so after the hurricane.

On May 5–6, 2006, the Zephyrs and Nashville Sounds participated in a 24-inning game at Nashville, Tennessee's Herschel Greer Stadium which was played over the course of two days and lasted a total of eight hours and seven minutes. The game matched the longest game, in terms of innings played, in PCL history. The Zephyrs scored once in the eighth inning and once in the ninth, and the teams remained tied through 18 innings before curfew was called. New Orleans won, 5–4, on the second day on a Wiki González RBI single. The Zephyrs set 12 franchise records, including striking out a league-record 29 times.

In 2008, the Zephyrs' season ended three days early due to the approach of Hurricane Gustav. When it became apparent that Gustav would hit the Gulf Coast on September 1, they cancelled their games of August 30 through September 1.

On September 22, 2008, the Zephyrs became the Triple-A affiliate of the Florida Marlins (now the Miami Marlins). In October 2009, the team unveiled a new logo with the letter Z set against a fleur-de-lis.

Longtime New Orleans sports public-address announcer Doug Moreau joined the game day staff in 2003 as the organization's fifth stadium announcer; he remained behind the microphone for 13 seasons. J.L. Vangilder was the official scorer from the beginning of the team's time in New Orleans. In June 2014, Moreau also took over the PA announcer duties for the remainder of the 2014 season and much of the 2015 season.

Before the 2017 season, team owners held a rename-the-team contest. The seven finalist monikers were Baby Cakes, Crawfish, King Cakes, Night Owls, Po'boys, Red Eyes, and Tailgators. On November 15, the team unveiled Baby Cakes as the new team name and purple, green, and gold as the new team colors and logos by Brandiose. The team also announced that any child born in the state of Louisiana during 2017 was eligible for a lifetime pass to Baby Cakes games, and would be entered into a raffle wherein the winner would receive a full four-year tuition to a state college in Louisiana upon their 18th birthday in 2035. As part of the renaming, the team's stadium, Zephyr Field, was changed to Shrine on Airline.

The name change was met with mixed reactions. Some fans found the new moniker and logos appealing, and the team reported increased merchandise sales after the announcement. Others expressed disappointment in the new name via social media, claiming it to be an unsuitable name for a sports team and that it did not accurately reflect local culture. At the time of the branding announcement, the team noted fan interest in retaining the Zephyrs moniker, but pointed out that the name had moved from Denver to New Orleans and had no regional ties or significance other than the roller coaster at Pontchartrain Beach which closed in 1983.

On April 14, 2017, Baby Cakes pitchers Scott Copeland (7 IP), Hunter Cervenka (1 IP), and Brandon Cunniff (1 IP) combined to pitch a no-hitter against the Iowa Cubs.

On September 2, 2019, the PCL Triple-A New Orleans Baby Cakes played their final game as the "Baby Cakes" on the road against the Oklahoma City Dodgers in Oklahoma City, winning 10–1 to cap 27 years of Triple-A baseball in the Big Easy.

The team was moved to Wichita, Kansas, in 2020, and renamed the Wichita Wind Surge. This left Louisiana without an affiliated minor league team for the first time since 1967. After the 2021 MiLB reorganization, the team was not invited back as a Triple-A affiliate and was instead invited to serve as a Double-A team.
