= Brandiose =

American sports branding firm

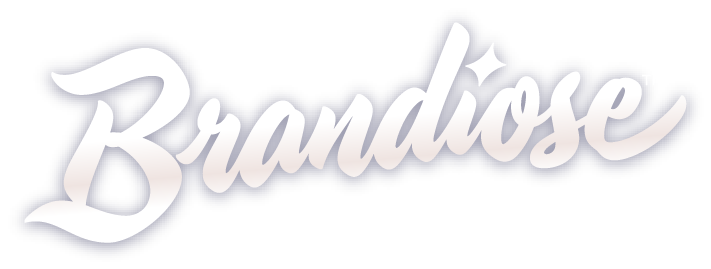
- Formerly: Plan B Branding
- Industry: Branding
- Founded: 2000 in San Diego, California
- Founder: Jason Klein; Casey White
- Headquarters: San Diego, California
- Website: brandiose.com

Brandiose Studios, Inc., commonly referred to as Brandiose, is an American branding firm based in San Diego, California. Founded by Jason Klein and Casey White in 2000, the company is especially known for its branding and design work with Minor League Baseball teams.

== History ==
San Diego natives and childhood friends Jason Klein and Casey White founded Plan B Branding, later renamed Brandiose, in 2000 after their firing from the San Diego Padres organization. The pair was fired after orchestrating a mid-game stunt in which the Padres' mascot, the Swinging Friar, smashed a piñata resembling former Padres pitcher Kevin Brown. Following their dismissal, the duo mailed 150 Minor League Baseball teams with the goal of landing a rebranding project with one of them. One of the teams, the West Tenn Diamond Jaxx, responded, and Brandiose redesigned the team's logo and branding. From that point onward, the company continued to work with a growing number of clients from all levels of Minor League Baseball; in 2021, Klein claimed that Brandiose's work was used by anywhere from 30 to 50 teams at a time.

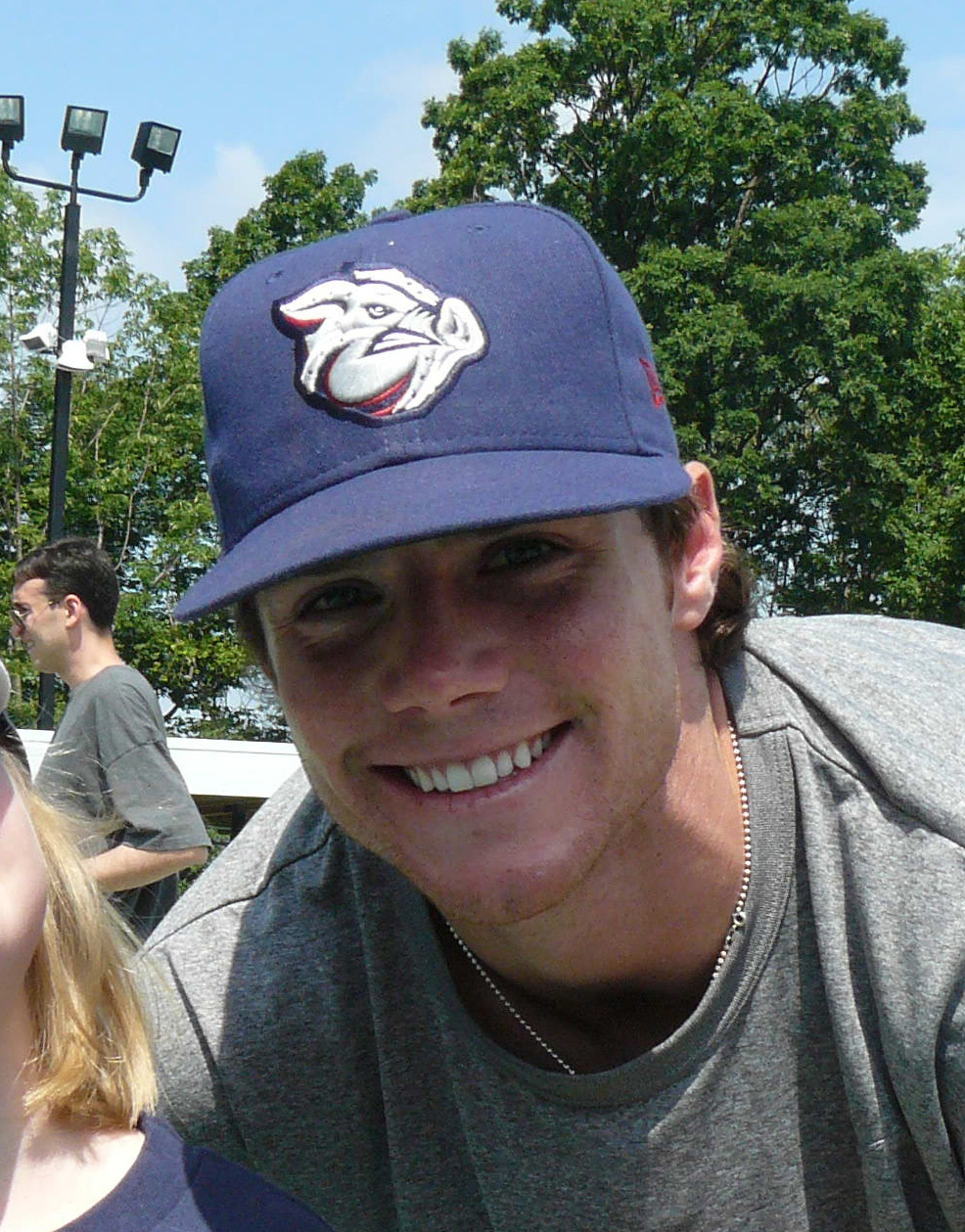
Jason Donald wearing a Lehigh Valley IronPigs cap designed by Brandiose

Two of Brandiose's partners, the Lehigh Valley IronPigs and the Richmond Flying Squirrels, led Minor League Baseball in merchandise sales in 2008 and 2010 respectively. Additionally, Brandiose's work for the Rocket City Trash Pandas in 2018 went viral, leading to $4 million in merchandise sales before the team played its first game in 2021. Outside of baseball, the company was responsible for the marketing for the 2017 ECHL Hockey Summer Meetings and designed the logo of the USL W League's Greenville Liberty. In 2020, in response to the COVID-19 pandemic, Klein and White founded The Clink Room, a website which sells baseball caps created by designers worldwide.

== Public image ==
Brandiose has faced criticism throughout its existence, with some detractors describing their designs as being overly uniform. Additionally, many of their designs and brandings have received negative reactions upon their reveal due to their perceived outlandishness when compared to traditional team names. Brandiose has responded to the criticism by embracing the controversy with the intent of creating more public interest. Klein and White have also insisted that all designs are deeply influenced by the local cultures of the markets represented, and not for pure novelty.
