= CarMax Park =

Ballpark in Richmond, Virginia

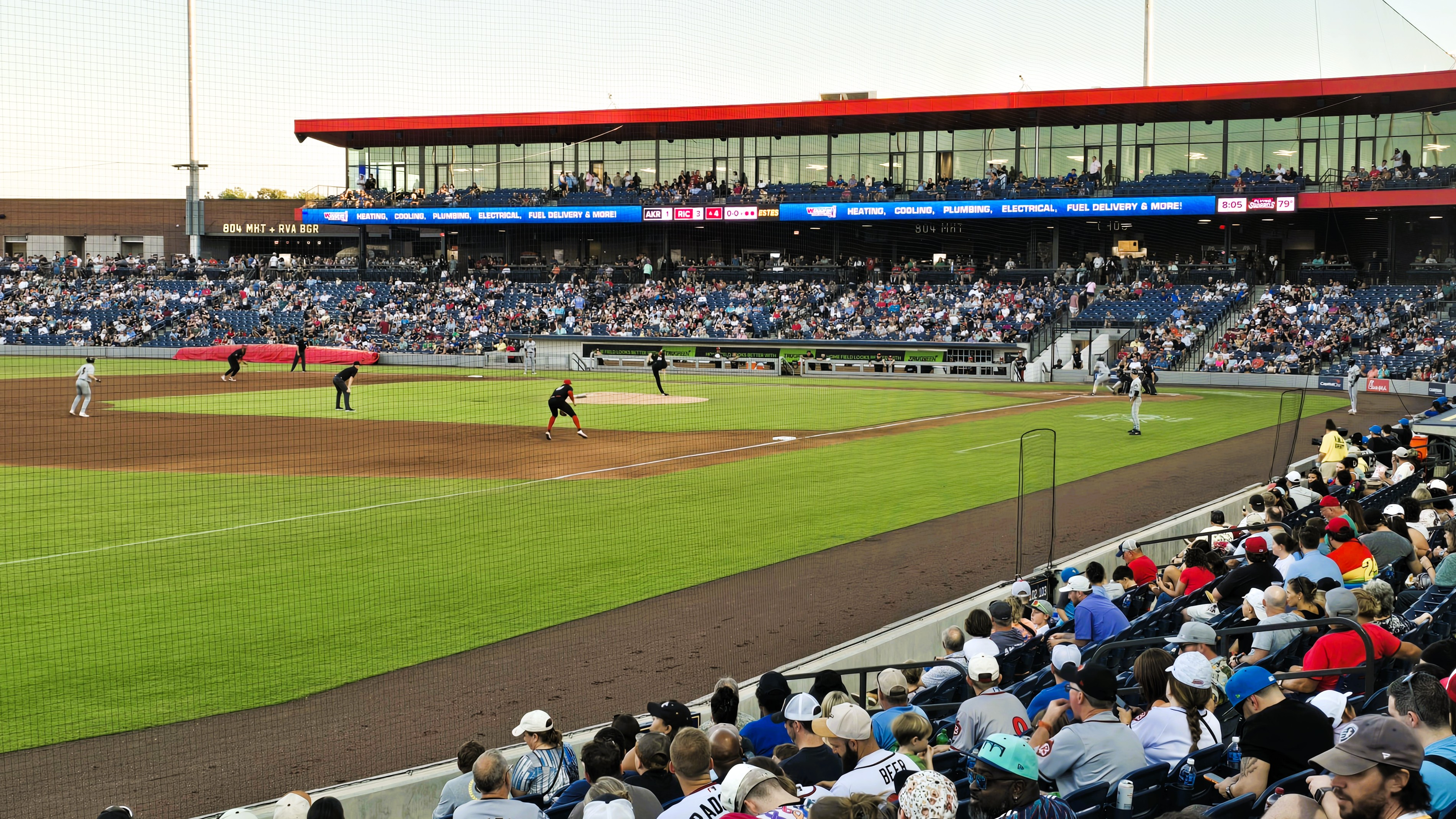
- CarMax Park in June 2026

- Location within Virginia Location within the United States
- Interactive map of CarMax Park
- Address: 2705 North Arthur Ashe Boulevard; Richmond, Virginia, U.S.
- Coordinates: 37°34′10″N 77°27′52″W
- Capacity: 9,585
- Surface: Tahoma 31 Bermudagrass
- Field size: Left field: 325 ft (99 m); Left-center: 350 ft (110 m); Center field: 400 ft (120 m); Right-center: 373 ft (114 m); Right field: 325 ft (99 m)
- Public transit: GRTC: 20

Construction
- Groundbreaking: September 6, 2024
- Opened: April 7, 2026
- Cost: $110 million
- Architects: LaBella Associates; KEi Architects
- Structural engineer: Walter P. Moore
- General contractor: Gilbane

Tenants
- Richmond Flying Squirrels (EL) 2026–present VCU Rams (NCAA) starting 2027

Website
- carmaxpark.com

CarMax Park is a ballpark in Richmond, Virginia, that serves as the home of the Richmond Flying Squirrels of the Eastern League, replacing The Diamond. Construction of the ballpark cost $110 million.

== History ==
The idea of replacing The Diamond as the home minor league ballpark dates back to 2000. One of the original locations for a replacement ballpark was in the Shockoe Bottom neighborhood of Richmond, near Downtown Richmond. Several Shockoe Bottom proposals aimed to replace The Diamond with a modern ballpark closer to downtown, while simultaneously spurring economic development in the area.

In the early 2000s, Richmond officials began exploring relocating the city's minor league baseball team, the Richmond Braves (Triple-A affiliate of the Atlanta Braves), to a new stadium in Shockoe Bottom. Proponents argued that a downtown ballpark would attract more visitors and provide a catalyst for urban redevelopment. However, concerns about flooding, traffic congestion, and the historic significance of Shockoe Bottom—once a major hub for the domestic slave trade—sparked strong opposition. The Richmond Braves eventually left the city in 2008, citing delays and uncertainty surrounding the stadium project. The Braves were replaced by the Richmond Flying Squirrels in 2010, as a Double-A affiliate of the San Francisco Giants.

The stadium proposal resurfaced in 2013 under Mayor Dwight C. Jones, who introduced an ambitious plan to build a multi-use development in Shockoe Bottom. This $200 million project included a 7,200-seat stadium, apartments, a hotel, a grocery store, and a museum to commemorate the area's history. The administration promoted the project as a way to revitalize the neighborhood, but it faced significant backlash from community activists and preservationists who felt the stadium would erase or overshadow the area's painful but vital history related to slavery.

Public opposition grew stronger in 2014, with local historians, preservation groups, and residents emphasizing the need to preserve Shockoe Bottom's history and protect its archeological integrity. Protests, petitions, and alternative proposals calling for the creation of a memorial park in the area gained traction. After failing to gain sufficient support from the Richmond City Council, the stadium proposal was shelved by the end of 2015.

In subsequent years, plans for a stadium in Shockoe Bottom remained dormant, while community efforts to establish a memorial park and museum continued. Meanwhile, discussions about a new stadium shifted focus back to the area surrounding The Diamond on the city's Northside.

=== Teams ===
The Flying Squirrels played their final game at The Diamond in September 2025 and began playing home games at CarMax Park in April 2026. The VCU Rams college baseball team will play a final season at The Diamond in 2026 and move into CarMax Park in 2027.

== Gallery ==
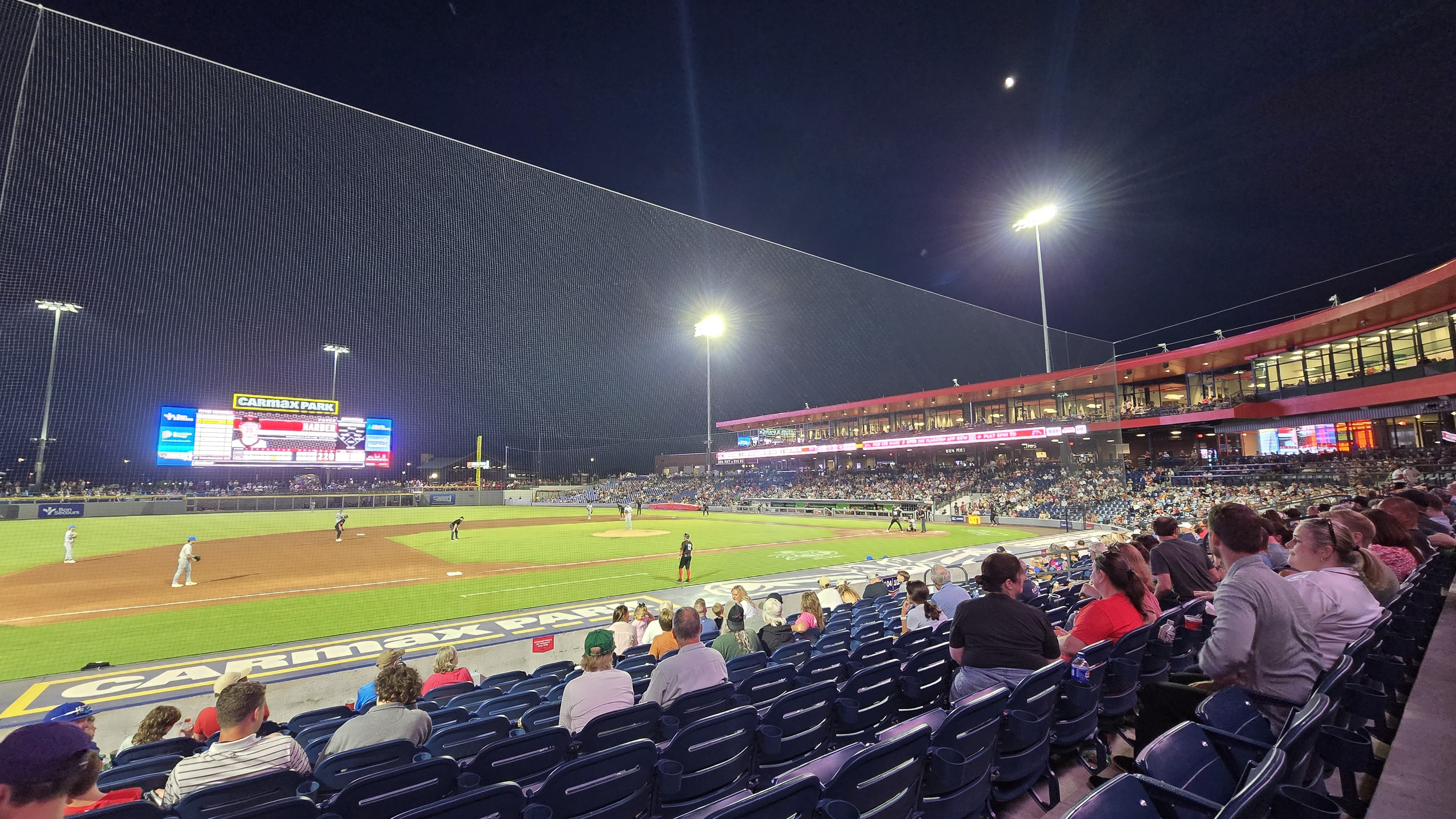
Baseball under the lights

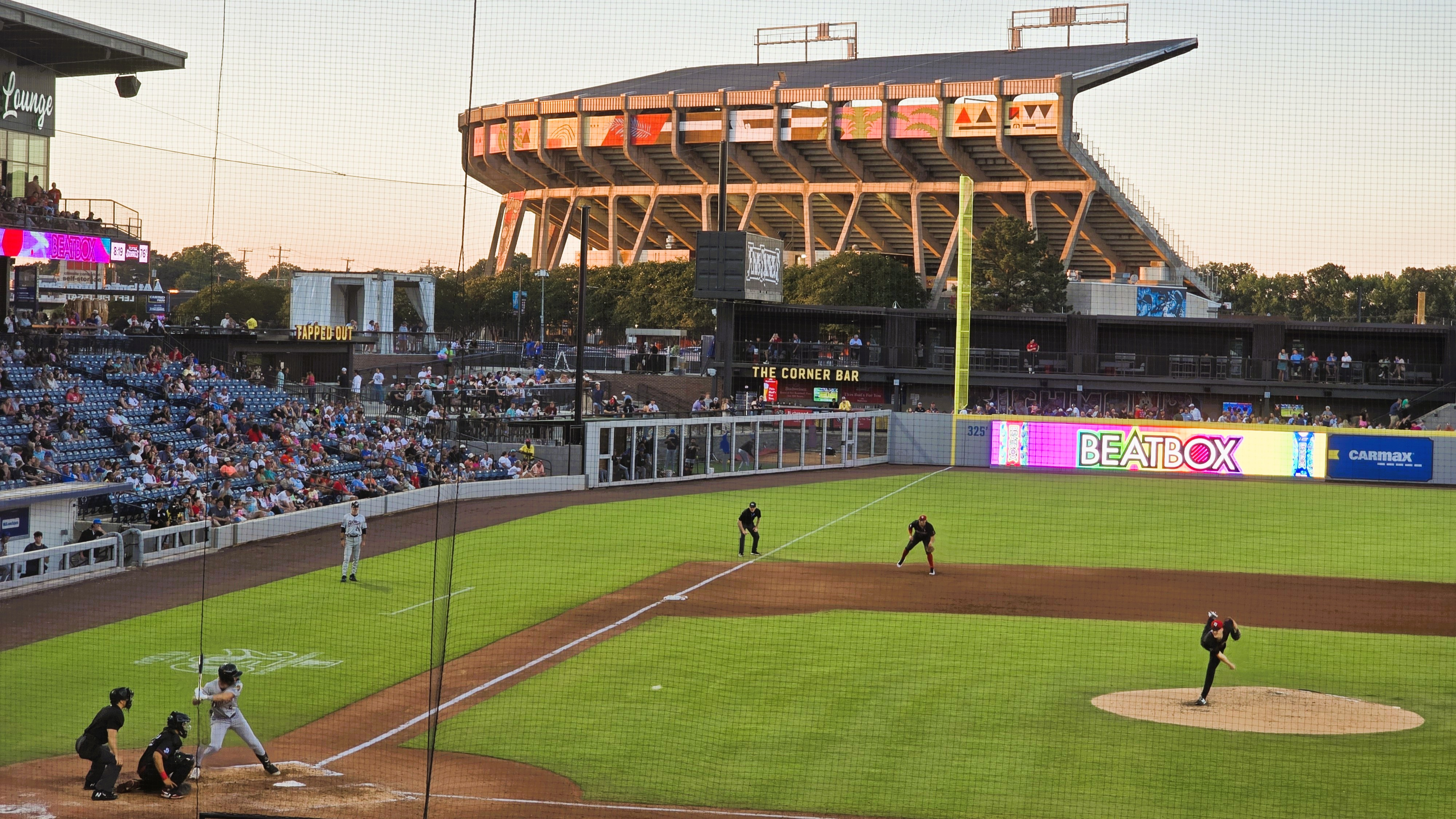
The Diamond in the background
