= Richmond Flying Squirrels =

- Founded in 1995 in Norwich, Connecticut; Based in Richmond, Virginia since 2010
Team logo
Cap insignia

Minor league affiliations
- Class: Double-A
- League: Eastern League
- Division: Southwest Division

Major league affiliations
- Team: San Francisco Giants (2003‍–‍present)
- Previous teams: New York Yankees (1995‍–‍2002)

Minor league titles
- League titles (1): 2002
- Division titles (3): 2002; 2009; 2014
- First-half titles (2): 2022; 2026
- Second-half titles (1): 2023

Team data
- Name: Richmond Flying Squirrels (2010‍–‍present)
- Previous names: Norwich Navigators (1995‍–‍2005); Connecticut Defenders (2006‍–‍2009)
- Colors: Black, red, gray, white
- Mascots: Nutzy and Nutasha
- Ballpark: CarMax Park (2026‍–‍present)
- Previous parks: Dodd Stadium (1995‍–‍2009); The Diamond (2010‍–‍2025)
- Owner/ Operator: Lou DiBella
- General manager: Anthony Oppermann
- Manager: Dennis Pelfrey
- Website: milb.com/richmond

The Richmond Flying Squirrels are a Minor League Baseball team based in Richmond, Virginia. The team, which is a part of the Eastern League, is the Double-A affiliate of the San Francisco Giants major league club, and plays at Carmax Park, the newly developed stadium next to their old ground, the Diamond. The Flying Squirrels have been affiliated with the Giants since 2010, making it the longest-running active affiliation in the Giants organization among teams not owned by the Giants. The Squirrels were previously known as the Connecticut Defenders.

The Flying Squirrels mark affiliated baseball's return to Richmond after a one-year absence prompted by the relocation of the former Triple-A International League's Richmond Braves to Lawrenceville, Georgia, in 2009, where they are now called the Gwinnett Stripers. The Squirrels hold the current record for the longest distance from their major league affiliate, at 2,872.5 miles from Oracle Park.

== History ==
On September 23, 2009, it was announced that the Connecticut Defenders would leave Norwich for their current home at The Diamond in Richmond, Virginia, where they would continue seeking proposals for a new ballpark in the Richmond metropolitan area. The team name was changed to the "Flying Squirrels".

The name the "Richmond Flying Squirrels" was chosen through a Richmond Times-Dispatch readers' "name-the-team-contest," which ended on October 15, 2009. The name was submitted by Brad Mead of Prince George, Virginia. Other finalists were the Rock Hoppers, Hambones, Rhinos, Flatheads, and Hush Puppies. (The name Hambones was later ruled out of the contest after the city's uproar and the NAACP finding that "the Hambones" could be seen as a derogatory term directed towards the African-American community.)

In conjunction with Major League Baseball's restructuring of Minor League Baseball in 2021, the Flying Squirrels were organized into the Double-A Northeast. In 2022, the Double-A Northeast became known as the Eastern League, the name historically used by the regional circuit prior to the 2021 reorganization.

== Logo ==
The new Flying Squirrels logo was unveiled on December 1, 2009. It is a black, red, and grey flying squirrel meant to look like the outline of Virginia with a patch in the shape of an "R" (for Richmond) on top of an acorn over its heart, roughly where Richmond is located in Virginia. The logo was designed by San Diego-based sports branding firm Brandiose. It was named the logo of the year by Ballpark Digest in 2010 and the best minor-league logo by Baseball America in 2015.

== Season records ==
- As Norwich Navigators
  - 1995: 70–71 (3rd), manager Jimmy Johnson
  - 1996: 71–70 (3rd), manager Jim Essian
  - 1997: 73–69 (2nd), manager Trey Hillman
  - 1998: 66–76 (4th), manager Trey Hillman
  - 1999: 78–64 (2nd), manager Lee Mazzilli
  - 2000: 76–66 (3rd), manager Dan Radison
  - 2001: 83–59 (2nd), manager Stump Merrill
  - 2002: 76–64 (1st), manager Luis Sojo
  - 2003: 62–79 (6th), manager Shane Turner
  - 2004: 69–74 (5th), manager Shane Turner
  - 2005: 71–72 (3rd), manager Dave Machemer
- As Connecticut Defenders
  - 2006: 64–77 (5th), manager Dave Machemer
  - 2007: 63–78 (5th), managers Dave Machemer (through July 21) and Shane Turner
  - 2008: 68–73 (4th), manager Bien Figueroa
  - 2009: 83–59 (1st), manager Steve Decker
- As Richmond Flying Squirrels
  - 2010: 68–73 (5th), manager Andy Skeels
  - 2011: 76–66 (2nd), manager Dave Machemer
  - 2012: 70–71 (4th), manager Dave Machemer
  - 2013: 70–72 (4th), manager Dave Machemer
  - 2014: 79–63 (1st), manager Russ Morman
  - 2015: 72–68 (3rd), manager José Alguacil
  - 2016: 62–79 (5th), manager Miguel Ojeda
  - 2017: 63–77 (5th), manager Kyle Haines
  - 2018: 62–76 (6th), manager Willie Harris
  - 2019: 55–84 (6th), manager Willie Harris
  - 2020: Season canceled due to COVID-19 pandemic
  - 2021: 57–56 (4th), manager Jose Alguacil
  - 2022: 66–71 (5th), manager Jose Alguacil
  - 2023: 74–64 (2nd), manager Dennis Pelfrey
  - 2024: 64–74 (4th), manager Dennis Pelfrey
  - 2025: 56–79 (6th), manager Dennis Pelfrey
  - 2026: 74–61 (2nd), manager Dennis Pelfrey

== Playoffs ==
- 1997 season: Lost to Portland, 3–2, in first round
- 1999 season: Defeated Trenton 3–2, in first round; lost to Harrisburg 3–2, in championship round.
- 2001 season: Lost to New Britain, 3–1, in first round
- 2002 season: Defeated New Haven, 3–0, in first round; defeated Harrisburg 3–2 to win Eastern League title.
- 2009 season: Defeated New Britain, 3–1, in first round; lost to Akron 3–1, in championship round.
- 2014 season: Defeated Akron, 3–1, in first round; lost to Binghamton 3–0, in championship round.
- 2022 season: Lost to Erie SeaWolves 2–0 in first round
- 2023 season: Lost to Erie SeaWolves 2–0 in first round
- 2026 season: TBA vs. Erie SeaWolves

== Roster ==
Richmond Flying Squirrels roster
| Players | Coaches/Other |
|---|---|
| Pitchers: 32 Jacob Bresnahan; 48 Jack Choate; 43 Greg Farone; 57 Marty Gair; 46 Marques Johnson; 53 Niko Mazza; 49 Charlie McDaniel; 40 Miguel Méndez *; 50 Manuel Mercedes ~; 37 Ben Peterson; 33 Shane Rademacher; 56 Dale Stanavich; 39 Ryan Vanderhei; 59 Esmerlin Vinicio; 28 Tyler Vogel; 35 Mitch White; Catchers: 19 Ty Hanchey; 26 Onil Perez; 14 Jancel Villarroel; Infielders: 6 Maui Ahuna; 23 Jose Astudillo; 2 Sabin Ceballos; 15 Dayson Croes; 10 Zander Darby; 7 Gavin Kilen; 16 Jack Payton; 13 Jean Carlos Sio; Outfielders: 8 Trevor Cohen; 1 Lisbel Diaz; 5 Dakota Jordan; 29 Zane Zielinski | Manager: 12 Dennis Pelfrey; Coaches: 52 Tommy Everidge (hitting); 9 Mike Morris (bullpen); 17 Lipso Nava (fundamentals); 58 Paul Oseguera (pitching); 60-day injured list: 32 Tyler Switalski; 7-day injured list; * On San Francisco Giants 40-man roster; ~ Development list; # Rehab assignment; ∞ Reserve list; ‡ Restricted list; § Suspended list; † Temporarily inactive list; Roster updated September 11, 2026; Transactions; → More rosters: MiLB • Eastern League; → San Francisco Giants minor league players |
