= 1935 Washington Senators season =

1935 Washington Senators
- League: American League
- Ballpark: Griffith Stadium
- City: Washington, D.C.
- Record: 67–86 (.438)
- League place: 6th
- Owners: Clark Griffith and William Richardson
- Managers: Bucky Harris
- Radio: WJSV (Arch McDonald)

The 1935 Washington Senators won 67 games, lost 86, and finished in sixth place in the American League. They were managed by Bucky Harris and played home games at Griffith Stadium.

== Regular season ==
=== Season standings ===
American League
Team	W	L	Pct.	GB	Home	Road
Detroit Tigers	93	58	.616	—	53‍–‍25	40‍–‍33
New York Yankees	89	60	.597	3	41‍–‍33	48‍–‍27
Cleveland Indians	82	71	.536	12	48‍–‍29	34‍–‍42
Boston Red Sox	78	75	.510	16	41‍–‍37	37‍–‍38
Chicago White Sox	74	78	.487	19½	42‍–‍34	32‍–‍44
Washington Senators	67	86	.438	27	37‍–‍39	30‍–‍47
St. Louis Browns	65	87	.428	28½	31‍–‍44	34‍–‍43
Philadelphia Athletics	58	91	.389	34	30‍–‍42	28‍–‍49

=== Record vs. opponents ===
1935 American League record Sources:
Team	BOS	CWS	CLE	DET	NYY	PHA	SLB	WSH
Boston	—	13–9	9–13–1	9–13	9–12	16–6	10–12	12–10
Chicago	9–13	—	10–12	11–11	9–11	12–10	11–11–1	12–10
Cleveland	13–9–1	12–10	—	7–15–1	8–14	12–10	15–6–1	15–7
Detroit	13–9	11–11	15–7–1	—	11–11	14–5	17–5	12–10
New York	12–9	11–9	14–8	11–11	—	14–6	12–10	15–7
Philadelphia	6–16	10–12	10–12	5–14	6–14	—	11–11	10–12
St. Louis	12–10	11–11–1	6–15–1	5–17	10–12	11–11	—	10–11–1
Washington	10–12	10–12	7–15	10–12	7–15	12–10	11–10–1	—

=== Roster ===
1935 Washington Senators
Roster
Pitchers: 31 Belve Bean; 12 Bobby Burke; 22 Henry Coppola; 18 Bump Hadley; 14 Jim Hayes; 12 Phil Hensiek; 12 Dick Lanahan; 19 Ed Linke; 12 Al McLean; 21 Bobo Newsom; 20 Leon Pettit; 14 Buck Rogers; 17 Jack Russell; 14 Lefty Stewart; 15 Tommy Thomas; 16 Monte Weaver; 11 Earl Whitehill	Catchers: 8 Cliff Bolton; 9 Sammy Holbrook; 10 Jack Redmond; 15 Bill Starr; Infielders: 7 Ossie Bluege; 32 Bobby Estalella; 26 Red Kress; 6 Joe Kuhel; 28 Lyn Lary; 33 Buddy Lewis; 34 John Mihalic; 1 Buddy Myer; 28 Alan Strange; 5 Cecil Travis	Outfielders: 3 Heinie Manush; 10 Red Marion; 31 Dee Miles; 24 Jake Powell; 2 Fred Schulte; 25 Fred Sington; 4 John Stone	Manager: 35 Bucky Harris; Coaches: -- Spencer Abbott; 23 Nick Altrock; 29 Dickey Kerr

== Player stats ==
= Indicates team leader

= Indicates league leader

=== Batting ===
==== Starters by position ====
Note: Pos = Position; G = Games played; AB = At bats; H = Hits; Avg. = Batting average; HR = Home runs; RBI = Runs batted in

Pos	Player	G	AB	H	Avg.	HR	RBI
C	Cliff Bolton	110	375	114	.304	2	55
1B	Joe Kuhel	151	633	165	.261	2	74
2B	Buddy Myer	151	616	215	.349	5	100
3B	Cecil Travis	138	534	170	.318	0	61
SS	Ossie Bluege	100	320	84	.263	0	34
OF	Heinie Manush	119	479	131	.273	4	56
OF	Jake Powell	139	551	172	.312	6	98
OF	John Stone	125	455	143	.314	1	78

==== Other batters ====
Note: G = Games played; AB = At bats; H = Hits; Avg. = Batting average; HR = Home runs; RBI = Runs batted in

Player	G	AB	H	Avg.	HR	RBI
Red Kress	84	252	75	.298	2	42
Fred Schulte	76	226	60	.265	2	23
Dee Miles	60	215	57	.265	0	29
Sammy Holbrook	52	135	35	.259	2	25
Lyn Lary	39	103	20	.194	0	7
Alan Strange	20	54	10	.185	0	5
Bobby Estalella	15	51	16	.314	2	10
Jack Redmond	22	34	6	.176	1	7
Buddy Lewis	8	28	3	.107	0	2
Bill Starr	12	24	5	.208	0	1
Fred Sington	20	22	4	.182	0	3
John Mihalic	6	22	5	.227	0	6
Red Marion	4	11	2	.182	1	1

=== Pitching ===
==== Starting pitchers ====
Note: G = Games pitched; IP = Innings pitched; W = Wins; L = Losses; ERA = Earned run average; SO = Strikeouts

Player	G	IP	W	L	ERA	SO
Earl Whitehill	34	279.1	14	13	4.29	102
Bump Hadley	35	230.1	10	15	4.92	77
Bobo Newsom	28	198.1	11	12	4.45	65
Dick Lanahan	3	20.2	0	3	5.66	10
Lefty Stewart	1	2.2	0	1	13.50	1

==== Other pitchers ====
Note: G = Games pitched; IP = Innings pitched; W = Wins; L = Losses; ERA = Earned run average; SO = Strikeouts

Player	G	IP	W	L	ERA	SO
Ed Linke	40	178.0	11	7	5.01	51
Jack Russell	43	126.0	4	9	5.71	30
Leon Pettit	41	109.0	8	5	4.95	45
Bobby Burke	15	66.1	1	8	7.46	16
Henry Coppola	19	59.1	3	4	5.92	19
Belve Bean	10	31.0	2	0	7.26	6
Jim Hayes	7	28.0	2	4	8.36	9
Phil Hensiek	6	13.0	0	3	9.69	6
Monte Weaver	5	12.0	1	1	5.25	4
Buck Rogers	2	10.0	0	1	7.20	7

==== Relief pitchers ====
Note: G = Games pitched; W = Wins; L = Losses; SV = Saves; ERA = Earned run average; SO = Strikeouts

Player	G	W	L	SV	ERA	SO
Al McLean	4	0	0	0	7.27	3
Red Kress	3	0	0	0	12.71	5
Tommy Thomas	1	0	0	0	54.00	0

== Farm system ==
Level	Team	League	Manager
A	Chattanooga Lookouts	Southern Association	Mule Shirley and Clyde Milan
D	Panama City Pilots	Georgia–Florida League	Bill Snyder, Bill Rodgers and Harry Snyder
