= 1935 Boston Red Sox season =

Major League Baseball season

1935 Boston Red Sox
- League: American League
- Ballpark: Fenway Park
- City: Boston, Massachusetts
- Record: 78–75 (.510)
- League place: 4th
- Owners: Tom Yawkey
- President: Tom Yawkey
- General managers: Eddie Collins
- Managers: Joe Cronin
- Radio: WNAC (Fred Hoey)
- Stats: ESPN.com; Baseball Reference

The 1935 Boston Red Sox season was the 35th season in the franchise's Major League Baseball history. The Red Sox finished fourth in the American League (AL) with a record of 78 wins and 75 losses, 16 games behind the Detroit Tigers, who went on to win the 1935 World Series. This was the Red Sox' first season with more wins than losses since 1918.

== Regular season ==
=== Season standings ===
American League
Team	W	L	Pct.	GB	Home	Road
Detroit Tigers	93	58	.616	—	53‍–‍25	40‍–‍33
New York Yankees	89	60	.597	3	41‍–‍33	48‍–‍27
Cleveland Indians	82	71	.536	12	48‍–‍29	34‍–‍42
Boston Red Sox	78	75	.510	16	41‍–‍37	37‍–‍38
Chicago White Sox	74	78	.487	19½	42‍–‍34	32‍–‍44
Washington Senators	67	86	.438	27	37‍–‍39	30‍–‍47
St. Louis Browns	65	87	.428	28½	31‍–‍44	34‍–‍43
Philadelphia Athletics	58	91	.389	34	30‍–‍42	28‍–‍49

=== Record vs. opponents ===
1935 American League record Sources:
Team	BOS	CWS	CLE	DET	NYY	PHA	SLB	WSH
Boston	—	13–9	9–13–1	9–13	9–12	16–6	10–12	12–10
Chicago	9–13	—	10–12	11–11	9–11	12–10	11–11–1	12–10
Cleveland	13–9–1	12–10	—	7–15–1	8–14	12–10	15–6–1	15–7
Detroit	13–9	11–11	15–7–1	—	11–11	14–5	17–5	12–10
New York	12–9	11–9	14–8	11–11	—	14–6	12–10	15–7
Philadelphia	6–16	10–12	10–12	5–14	6–14	—	11–11	10–12
St. Louis	12–10	11–11–1	6–15–1	5–17	10–12	11–11	—	10–11–1
Washington	10–12	10–12	7–15	10–12	7–15	12–10	11–10–1	—

=== Opening Day lineup ===
1	Max Bishop	2B
5	Billy Werber	3B
6	Carl Reynolds	CF
4	Joe Cronin	SS
7	Rick Ferrell	C
5	Moose Solters	RF
21	Mel Almada	CF
8	Babe Dahlgren	1B
12	Wes Ferrell	P

=== Roster ===
1935 Boston Red Sox
Roster
Pitchers: 23 Stew Bowers; 66 Joe Cascarella; 12 Wes Ferrell; 10 Lefty Grove; 28 George Hockette; 16 Hank Johnson; 14 Fritz Ostermueller; 35 George Pipgras; 11 Gordon Rhodes; 18 Walt Ripley; 23 Hy Vandenberg; 15 Rube Walberg; 17 Johnny Welch; 16 Jack Wilson	Catchers: 19 Moe Berg; 28 George Dickey; 7 Rick Ferrell; Infielders: 1 Max Bishop; 4 Joe Cronin; 8 Babe Dahlgren; 22 Doc Farrell; -- John Kroner; 23 Ski Melillo; 2 Billy Werber; 27 Dib Williams	Outfielders: 21 Mel Almada; 9 Dusty Cooke; 14 Skinny Graham; 3 Roy Johnson; 25 Bing Miller; 6 Carl Reynolds; 7 Moose Solters; Other batters: 22 Lou Legett	Manager: 4 Joe Cronin; Coaches: 30 Tom Daly (Third Base); 26 Al Schacht (Assistant)

== Player stats ==
= Indicates team leader

=== Batting ===
==== Starters by position ====
Note: Pos = Position; G = Games played; AB = At bats; H = Hits; Avg. = Batting average; HR = Home runs; RBI = Runs batted in

Pos	Player	G	AB	H	Avg.	HR	RBI
C	Rick Ferrell	133	458	138	.301	3	61
1B	Babe Dahlgren	149	525	138	.263	9	63
2B	Ski Melillo	106	400	104	.260	1	39
3B	Billy Werber	124	462	118	.255	14	61
SS	Joe Cronin	144	556	164	.295	9	95
OF	Mel Almada	151	607	176	.290	3	59
OF	Roy Johnson	145	553	174	.315	3	66
OF	Dusty Cooke	100	294	90	.306	3	34

==== Other batters ====
Note: G = Games played; AB = At bats; H = Hits; Avg. = Batting average; HR = Home runs; RBI = Runs batted in

Player	G	AB	H	Avg.	HR	RBI
Dib Williams	75	251	63	.251	3	25
Carl Reynolds	78	244	66	.270	6	35
Bing Miller	78	138	42	.304	3	26
Max Bishop	60	122	28	.230	1	14
Moe Berg	38	98	28	.286	2	12
Moose Solters	24	79	19	.241	0	8
George Dickey	5	11	0	.000	0	1
Skinny Graham	8	10	3	.300	0	1
Doc Farrell	4	7	2	.286	0	1
John Kroner	2	4	1	.250	0	0
Lou Legett	2	0	0	----	0	0

=== Pitching ===
= Indicates league leader

==== Starting pitchers ====
Note: G = Games pitched; IP = Innings pitched; W = Wins; L = Losses; ERA = Earned run average; SO = Strikeouts

Player	G	IP	W	L	ERA	SO
Wes Ferrell	41	322.1	25	14	3.22	110
Lefty Grove	35	273.0	20	12	2.70	121
Fritz Ostermueller	22	137.2	7	8	3.92	41

==== Other pitchers ====
Note: G = Games pitched; IP = Innings pitched; W = Wins; L = Losses; ERA = Earned run average; SO = Strikeouts

Player	G	IP	W	L	ERA	SO
Gordon Rhodes	34	146.1	2	10	5.41	44
Johnny Welch	31	143.0	10	9	4.47	48
Rube Walberg	44	142.2	5	9	3.91	44
Jack Wilson	23	64.0	3	4	4.22	19
George Hockette	23	61.0	2	3	5.16	11
Hank Johnson	13	31.0	2	1	5.52	14
Stew Bowers	10	23.2	2	1	3.42	5
Joe Cascarella	6	17.0	0	3	6.88	9
George Pipgras	5	5.0	0	1	14.40	2

==== Relief pitchers ====
Note: G = Games pitched; W = Wins; L = Losses; SV = Saves; ERA = Earned run average; SO = Strikeouts

Player	G	W	L	SV	ERA	SO
Hy Vandenberg	3	0	0	0	20.25	2
Walt Ripley	2	0	0	0	9.00	0

== Farm system ==
Level	Team	League	Manager
B	Charlotte Hornets	Piedmont League	Frank O'Rourke
C	Shreveport Sports / Gladewater Bears	West Dixie League	Fred Nicholson and Neal Rabe
D	Danville-Schoolfield Leafs	Bi-State League	Herb Brett

Shreveport franchise transferred to Gladewater and renamed, June 4, 1935
