= 1935 St. Louis Browns season =

Major League Baseball season

1935 St. Louis Browns
- League: American League
- Ballpark: Sportsman's Park
- City: St. Louis, Missouri
- Record: 65–87 (.428)
- League place: 7th
- Owners: Estate of Phil Ball
- Managers: Rogers Hornsby
- Radio: KMOX (France Laux); KWK (Bob Thomas); WIL (AM) (Neil Norman)

The 1935 St. Louis Browns season was a season in American baseball. It involved the Browns finishing 7th in the American League with a record of 65 wins and 87 losses.

== Regular season ==
=== Season standings ===
American League
Team	W	L	Pct.	GB	Home	Road
Detroit Tigers	93	58	.616	—	53‍–‍25	40‍–‍33
New York Yankees	89	60	.597	3	41‍–‍33	48‍–‍27
Cleveland Indians	82	71	.536	12	48‍–‍29	34‍–‍42
Boston Red Sox	78	75	.510	16	41‍–‍37	37‍–‍38
Chicago White Sox	74	78	.487	19½	42‍–‍34	32‍–‍44
Washington Senators	67	86	.438	27	37‍–‍39	30‍–‍47
St. Louis Browns	65	87	.428	28½	31‍–‍44	34‍–‍43
Philadelphia Athletics	58	91	.389	34	30‍–‍42	28‍–‍49

=== Record vs. opponents ===
1935 American League record Sources:
Team	BOS	CWS	CLE	DET	NYY	PHA	SLB	WSH
Boston	—	13–9	9–13–1	9–13	9–12	16–6	10–12	12–10
Chicago	9–13	—	10–12	11–11	9–11	12–10	11–11–1	12–10
Cleveland	13–9–1	12–10	—	7–15–1	8–14	12–10	15–6–1	15–7
Detroit	13–9	11–11	15–7–1	—	11–11	14–5	17–5	12–10
New York	12–9	11–9	14–8	11–11	—	14–6	12–10	15–7
Philadelphia	6–16	10–12	10–12	5–14	6–14	—	11–11	10–12
St. Louis	12–10	11–11–1	6–15–1	5–17	10–12	11–11	—	10–11–1
Washington	10–12	10–12	7–15	10–12	7–15	12–10	11–10–1	—

=== Notable transactions ===
- June 30, 1935: Heinie Mueller was released by the Browns.

=== Roster ===
1935 St. Louis Browns
Roster
Pitchers: 18 Ivy Andrews; 12 George Blaeholder; 12 Sugar Cain; 16 Earl Caldwell; 16 Dick Coffman; 25 Snipe Hansen; 24 Jack Knott; 21 Bobo Newsom; -- Bob Poser; 17 Fay Thomas; 19 Russ Van Atta; 15 Jim Walkup; 25 Bob Weiland	Catchers: 9 Frank Grube; 9 Tommy Heath; 10 Rollie Hemsley; Infielders: 22 Ollie Bejma; 4 Johnny Burnett; 2 Jack Burns; 14 Tom Carey; 7 Harlond Clift; 11 Rogers Hornsby; 1 Lyn Lary; 5 Ski Melillo; 20 Heinie Mueller; 1 Alan Strange	Outfielders: 3 Beau Bell; 21 Ed Coleman; 15 Debs Garms; 20 Mel Mazzera; 8 Ray Pepper; 5 Moose Solters; 25 Hal Warnock; 6 Sam West	Manager: 11 Rogers Hornsby; Coaches: 27 Grover Hartley; 26 Charley O'Leary

== Player stats ==
=== Batting ===
==== Starters by position ====
Note: Pos = Position; G = Games played; AB = At bats; H = Hits; Avg. = Batting average; HR = Home runs; RBI = Runs batted in

Pos	Player	G	AB	H	Avg.	HR	RBI
C	Rollie Hemsley	144	504	146	.290	0	48
1B	Jack Burns	143	549	157	.286	5	67
2B	Tom Carey	76	296	86	.291	0	42
3B	Harlond Clift	137	475	140	.295	11	69
SS	Lyn Lary	93	371	107	.288	2	35
OF	Sam West	138	527	158	.300	10	70
OF	Ed Coleman	108	397	114	.287	17	71
OF	Moose Solters	127	552	182	.330	18	104

==== Other batters ====
Note: G = Games played; AB = At bats; H = Hits; Avg. = Batting average; HR = Home runs; RBI = Runs batted in

Player	G	AB	H	Avg.	HR	RBI
Ray Pepper	92	261	66	.253	4	37
Beau Bell	76	220	55	.250	3	17
Johnny Burnett	70	206	46	.223	0	26
Ollie Bejma	64	198	38	.192	2	26
Alan Strange	49	147	34	.231	0	17
Tommy Heath	47	93	22	.237	0	9
Ski Melillo	19	62	13	.210	0	5
Mel Mazzera	12	30	7	.233	1	2
Heinie Mueller	16	27	5	.185	0	1
Rogers Hornsby	10	24	5	.208	0	3
Debs Garms	10	15	4	.267	0	0
Hal Warnock	6	7	2	.286	0	0
Frank Grube	3	6	2	.333	0	0

=== Pitching ===
= Indicates league leader

==== Starting pitchers ====
Note: G = Games pitched; IP = Innings pitched; W = Wins; L = Losses; ERA = Earned run average; SO = Strikeouts

Player	G	IP	W	L	ERA	SO
Sugar Cain	31	167.2	9	8	5.26	68
Bobo Newsom	7	42.2	0	6	4.85	22
Earl Caldwell	6	36.2	3	2	3.68	5

==== Other pitchers ====
Note: G = Games pitched; IP = Innings pitched; W = Wins; L = Losses; ERA = Earned run average; SO = Strikeouts; SV = Saves

Player	G	IP	W	L	ERA	SO	SV
Ivy Andrews	50	213.1	13	7	3.54	43	1
Jack Knott	48	187.2	11	8	4.60	45	7
Jim Walkup	55	181.1	6	9	6.25	44	0
Russ Van Atta	53	170.1	9	16	5.34	87	3
Fay Thomas	49	147.0	7	15	4.78	67	1
Dick Coffman	41	143.2	5	11	6.14	34	2
Bob Weiland	14	32.0	0	2	9.56	11	0
George Blaeholder	6	17.2	1	1	7.13	0	0
Bob Poser	4	13.2	1	1	9.22	1	0

==== Relief pitchers ====
Note: G = Games pitched; W = Wins; L = Losses; SV = Saves; ERA = Earned run average; SO = Strikeouts

Player	G	W	L	SV	ERA	SO
Snipe Hansen	10	0	1	0	8.78	8

== Farm system ==
Level	Team	League	Manager
A	San Antonio Missions	Texas League	Hank Severeid
D	Palestine Pals	West Dixie League	Bobby Goff
