= Vito Tamulis =

American baseball player

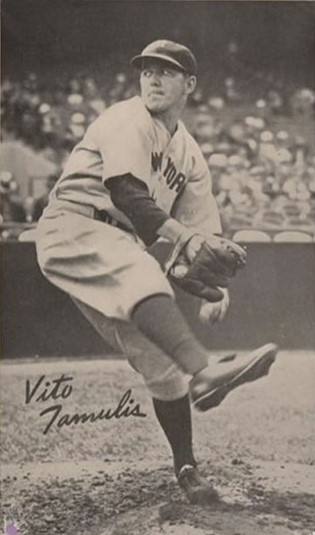
- Pitcher
- Born: July 11, 1911; Cambridge, Massachusetts, U.S.
- Died: May 5, 1974 (aged 62); Nashville, Tennessee, U.S.
- Batted: Left Threw: Left

MLB debut
- September 25, 1934, for the New York Yankees

Last MLB appearance
- July 25, 1941, for the Brooklyn Dodgers

MLB statistics
- Win–loss record: 40–28
- Earned run average: 3.97
- Strikeouts: 294
- Stats at Baseball Reference

Teams
- New York Yankees (1934–1935); St. Louis Browns (1938); Brooklyn Dodgers (1938–1940); Philadelphia Phillies (1941); Brooklyn Dodgers (1941)

Vitautis Casimirus Tamulis (July 11, 1911 – May 5, 1974) was an American left-handed pitcher in Major League Baseball who played for the New York Yankees, St. Louis Browns, Philadelphia Phillies and Brooklyn Dodgers from 1934 to 1941.

== Biography ==
A native of Cambridge, Massachusetts of Lithuanian descent, Tamulis attended The English High School, where he led the school's baseball team to the 1930 Boston city championship. While still in high school in 1929, he played for the Osterville and Hyannis teams in the Cape Cod Baseball League.

Tamulis was signed by the New York Yankees as an 18-year-old, and began his professional baseball career in 1930 with the Chambersburg Young Yanks of the Blue Ridge League. He worked his way through the minor league system, and was called up by New York late in the 1934 season. Tamulis made his major league debut on September 25, getting the start on the mound for the Yankees against the Philadelphia A's at Shibe Park. The A's countered with hurler Joe Cascarella, and featured a lineup that included Baseball Hall of Famer Jimmie Foxx batting cleanup. Tamulis pitched brilliantly, tossing a complete-game shutout, scattering seven hits (two to Foxx), and striking out five. Yankees Hall of Fame slugger Lou Gehrig homered, and Tamulis himself singled and scored on Red Rolfe's triple. New York came away with a 5–0 win in Tamulis' only appearance of the season.

Tamulis became a Yankee regular in 1935, posting a 10–5 record with a 4.09 ERA over 160.2 innings. Highlights of his 1935 season included a complete-game shutout of the Cleveland Indians at Yankee Stadium on May 16, and a 10-inning complete game performance in a hard-luck 2–1 loss to the St. Louis Browns in the second game of a doubleheader in the Bronx on July 21, with Tamulis yielding the game-winning homer to Moose Solters in the 10th. Tamulis himself clouted his only major league four-bagger on June 11, a two-run homer off Browns hurler Russ Van Atta at Sportsman's Park. Tamulis had three RBI on the day, and went the distance on the mound in the Yankees' 9–3 victory.

After the 1935 season, Tamulis was weakened by a prolonged bout of pleurisy, and as a result spent the 1936 and 1937 seasons with the Newark Bears of the International League. After the 1937 season, he was traded to the St. Louis Browns for Harry Davis. Tamulis appeared in only three games for the Browns early in their 1938 season, taking losses in all three appearances with a 7.63 ERA.

He was claimed off waivers by the Brooklyn Dodgers, and turned his season around, posting a 12–6 record in 159.2 innings with a 3.83 ERA for the 1938 Dodgers. He appeared in 39 games for Brooklyn in 1939, and 41 games in 1940. After the 1940 season, the Dodgers traded Tamulis to the Philadelphia Phillies, who traded him back to the Dodgers after six lackluster performances early in the 1941 season. He appeared in 12 more games for the Dodgers that season, before being shipped off to the Nashville Volunteers of the Southern Association in July. He never made another big-league appearance.

Tamulis posted an impressive 20–8 record for Nashville in 1942, and entered military service after the season. With World War II over, Tamulis returned to Nashville for the 1946 season, and in 1948 became player-manager of the Hopkinsville Hoppers of the Kentucky–Illinois–Tennessee League, posting a 17–3 record on the mound in 1948. His last playing season for the Hoppers was 1951. At Hopkinsville, Tamulis was particularly renowned for his Eephus pitch, which he had used with success in the big leagues against sluggers such as Johnny Mize.

Tamulis remained in the Nashville area after his baseball career. Tamulis died of a heart ailment at a Veterans Administration hospital in Nashville on May 5, 1974, age 62.
