= 1935 Cleveland Indians season =

1935 Cleveland Indians
- League: American League
- Ballpark: League Park
- City: Cleveland, Ohio
- Owners: Alva Bradley
- General managers: Billy Evans, Cy Slapnicka
- Managers: Walter Johnson, Steve O'Neill
- Radio: WHK (Jack Graney)

The 1935 Cleveland Indians season was a season in American baseball. The team finished in third place, 12 games behind league champion Detroit.

== Regular season ==
=== Season standings ===
American League
Team	W	L	Pct.	GB	Home	Road
Detroit Tigers	93	58	.616	—	53‍–‍25	40‍–‍33
New York Yankees	89	60	.597	3	41‍–‍33	48‍–‍27
Cleveland Indians	82	71	.536	12	48‍–‍29	34‍–‍42
Boston Red Sox	78	75	.510	16	41‍–‍37	37‍–‍38
Chicago White Sox	74	78	.487	19½	42‍–‍34	32‍–‍44
Washington Senators	67	86	.438	27	37‍–‍39	30‍–‍47
St. Louis Browns	65	87	.428	28½	31‍–‍44	34‍–‍43
Philadelphia Athletics	58	91	.389	34	30‍–‍42	28‍–‍49

=== Record vs. opponents ===
1935 American League record Sources:
Team	BOS	CWS	CLE	DET	NYY	PHA	SLB	WSH
Boston	—	13–9	9–13–1	9–13	9–12	16–6	10–12	12–10
Chicago	9–13	—	10–12	11–11	9–11	12–10	11–11–1	12–10
Cleveland	13–9–1	12–10	—	7–15–1	8–14	12–10	15–6–1	15–7
Detroit	13–9	11–11	15–7–1	—	11–11	14–5	17–5	12–10
New York	12–9	11–9	14–8	11–11	—	14–6	12–10	15–7
Philadelphia	6–16	10–12	10–12	5–14	6–14	—	11–11	10–12
St. Louis	12–10	11–11–1	6–15–1	5–17	10–12	11–11	—	10–11–1
Washington	10–12	10–12	7–15	10–12	7–15	12–10	11–10–1	—

=== Notable transactions ===
- August 12, 1935: Shanty Hogan was signed as a free agent by the Indians.

=== Roster ===
1935 Cleveland Indians
Roster
Pitchers: 17 Belve Bean; 16 Clint Brown; 21 Lloyd Brown; 15 Denny Galehouse; 18 Mel Harder; 19 Oral Hildebrand; 12 Willis Hudlin; 22 Thornton Lee; 33 Monte Pearson; 24 Lefty Stewart; 23 Ralph Winegarner	Catchers: 8 Bill Brenzel; 9 Bob Garbark; 14 Greek George; 9 Glenn Myatt; 15,9 Eddie Phillips; 11 Frankie Pytlak; Infielders: 2 Boze Berger; 34 Odell Hale; 29 Roy Hughes; 5 Willie Kamm; 4 Bill Knickerbocker; 7 Hal Trosky	Outfielders: 3 Earl Averill; 35 Bruce Campbell; 5 Kit Carson; 1 Milt Galatzer; 6 Joe Vosmik; 31 Ab Wright	Manager: 30 Steve O'Neill; 10 Walter Johnson; Coaches: 20 Patsy Gharrity; 30 Steve O'Neill; -- Earl Wolgamot

== Player stats ==
= Indicates team leader

= Indicates league leader

=== Batting ===
==== Starters by position ====
Note: Pos = Position; G = Games played; AB = At bats; H = Hits; Avg. = Batting average; HR = Home runs; RBI = Runs batted in

Pos	Player	G	AB	H	Avg.	HR	RBI
C	Eddie Phillips	70	220	60	.273	1	41
1B	Hal Trosky	154	632	171	.271	26	113
2B	Boze Berger	124	461	119	.258	5	43
SS	Bill Knickerbocker	132	540	161	.298	0	55
3B	Odell Hale	150	589	179	.304	16	101
OF	Joe Vosmik	152	620	216	.348	10	110
OF	Bruce Campbell	80	308	100	.325	7	54
OF	Earl Averill	140	563	162	.288	19	79

==== Other batters ====
Note: G = Games played; AB = At bats; H = Hits; Avg. = Batting average; HR = Home runs; RBI = Runs batted in

Player	G	AB	H	Avg.	HR	RBI
Roy Hughes	82	266	78	.293	0	14
Milt Galatzer	93	259	78	.301	0	19
Ab Wright	67	160	38	.238	2	18
Frankie Pytlak	55	149	44	.295	1	12
Bill Brenzel	52	142	31	.218	0	14
Ralph Winegarner	65	84	26	.310	3	17
Glenn Myatt	10	36	3	.083	0	2
Kit Carson	16	22	5	.227	0	1
Bob Garbark	6	18	6	.333	0	4
Willie Kamm	6	18	6	.333	0	1
Greek George	2	0	0	.---	0	0

=== Pitching ===
==== Starting pitchers ====
Note: G = Games pitched; IP = Innings pitched; W = Wins; L = Losses; ERA = Earned run average; SO = Strikeouts

Player	G	IP	W	L	ERA	SO
Mel Harder	42	287.1	22	11	3.29	95
Willie Hudlin	36	231.2	15	11	3.69	45
Monte Pearson	30	181.2	8	13	4.90	90
Thornton Lee	32	180.2	7	10	4.04	81
Odell Hildebrand	34	171.1	9	8	3.94	49

==== Other pitchers ====
Note: G = Games pitched; IP = Innings pitched; W = Wins; L = Losses; ERA = Earned run average; SO = Strikeouts

Player	G	IP	W	L	ERA	SO
Denny Galehouse	5	13.0	1	0	9.00	8
Belve Bean	1	1.0	0	0	9.00	0

==== Relief pitchers ====
Note: G = Games pitched; W = Wins; L = Losses; SV = Saves; ERA = Earned run average; SO = Strikeouts

Player	G	W	L	SV	ERA	SO
Lloyd Brown	42	8	7	4	3.61	45
Lefty Stewart	24	6	6	2	5.44	24
Ralph Winegarner	25	2	2	0	5.75	41
Clint Brown	23	4	3	2	5.14	20

== Awards and honors ==
All Star Game

Earl Averill, Outfielder (replaced due to injury)

Mel Harder, Pitcher

Joe Vosmik, Outfielder (Starter)

== Farm system ==
Level	Team	League	Manager
A	New Orleans Pelicans	Southern Association	Larry Gilbert
C	Zanesville Grays	Middle Atlantic League	Earl Wolgamot
D	Opelousas Indians	Evangeline League	Jay Kirke and Milt Delmas
D	Fargo-Moorhead Twins	Northern League	Hal Irelan
D	Butler Indians	Pennsylvania State Association	Leo Mackey
