= 1935 Chicago White Sox season =

1935 Chicago White Sox
- League: American League
- Ballpark: Comiskey Park
- City: Chicago
- Owners: J. Louis Comiskey
- General manager: Harry Grabiner
- Managers: Jimmy Dykes
- Radio: WBBM (Pat Flanagan); WGN (Bob Elson); WIND (Russ Hodges); WMAQ (Hal Totten)

The 1935 Chicago White Sox season was the team's 35th season in the major leagues, and its 36th season overall. They finished with a record of 74–78, good enough for fifth place in the American League, 19.5 games behind the first place Detroit Tigers.

== Offseason ==
- November 21, 1934: Billy Sullivan, Phil Gallivan and $20,000 were traded by the White Sox to the Indianapolis Indians for George Washington.

== Regular season ==
=== Season standings ===
American League
Team	W	L	Pct.	GB	Home	Road
Detroit Tigers	93	58	.616	—	53‍–‍25	40‍–‍33
New York Yankees	89	60	.597	3	41‍–‍33	48‍–‍27
Cleveland Indians	82	71	.536	12	48‍–‍29	34‍–‍42
Boston Red Sox	78	75	.510	16	41‍–‍37	37‍–‍38
Chicago White Sox	74	78	.487	19½	42‍–‍34	32‍–‍44
Washington Senators	67	86	.438	27	37‍–‍39	30‍–‍47
St. Louis Browns	65	87	.428	28½	31‍–‍44	34‍–‍43
Philadelphia Athletics	58	91	.389	34	30‍–‍42	28‍–‍49

=== Record vs. opponents ===
1935 American League record Sources:
Team	BOS	CWS	CLE	DET	NYY	PHA	SLB	WSH
Boston	—	13–9	9–13–1	9–13	9–12	16–6	10–12	12–10
Chicago	9–13	—	10–12	11–11	9–11	12–10	11–11–1	12–10
Cleveland	13–9–1	12–10	—	7–15–1	8–14	12–10	15–6–1	15–7
Detroit	13–9	11–11	15–7–1	—	11–11	14–5	17–5	12–10
New York	12–9	11–9	14–8	11–11	—	14–6	12–10	15–7
Philadelphia	6–16	10–12	10–12	5–14	6–14	—	11–11	10–12
St. Louis	12–10	11–11–1	6–15–1	5–17	10–12	11–11	—	10–11–1
Washington	10–12	10–12	7–15	10–12	7–15	12–10	11–10–1	—

=== Roster ===
1935 Chicago White Sox
Roster
Pitchers: -- Italo Chelini; -- George Earnshaw; 25,66 Carl Fischer; 17 Sam Jones; 24 Vern Kennedy; 16 Ted Lyons; 29 Ray Phelps; 48 Jack Salveson; 25 Lee Stine; 36 Monty Stratton; 19 Les Tietje; 48 Joe Vance; 34 John Whitehead; 23 Whit Wyatt	Catchers: 35 Frank Grube; 14 Luke Sewell; 15 Merv Shea; Infielders: 4 Luke Appling; 3 Zeke Bonura; 5 Jimmy Dykes; 2 Jackie Hayes; 27 Marty Hopkins; -- Mike Kreevich; 37 Tony Piet; 28 Glenn Wright	Outfielders: 8 Jocko Conlan; 6 Mule Haas; 9 Rip Radcliff; 7 Al Simmons; 45 Fred Tauby; 12 George Washington; Other batters: -- Bud Hafey	Manager: 5 Jimmy Dykes; Coaches: 33 Jimmy Austin; 22 Bill Webb

== Player stats ==
=== Batting ===
==== Starters by position ====
Note: Pos = Position; G = Games played; AB = At bats; H = Hits; Avg. = Batting average; HR = Home runs; RBI = Runs batted in

Pos	Player	G	AB	H	Avg.	HR	RBI
C	Luke Sewell	118	421	120	.285	2	67
1B	Zeke Bonura	138	550	162	.295	21	92
2B	Jackie Hayes	89	329	88	.267	4	45
3B	Jimmy Dykes	117	403	116	.288	4	61
SS	Luke Appling	153	525	161	.307	1	71
OF	Rip Radcliff	146	623	178	.286	10	68
OF	Al Simmons	128	525	140	.267	16	79
OF	Mule Haas	92	327	95	.291	2	40

==== Other batters ====
Note: G = Games played; AB = At bats; H = Hits; Avg. = Batting average; HR = Home runs; RBI = Runs batted in

Player	G	AB	H	Avg.	HR	RBI
George Washington	108	339	96	.283	8	47
Tony Piet	77	292	87	.298	3	27
Marty Hopkins	59	144	32	.222	2	17
Jocko Conlan	65	140	40	.286	0	15
Merv Shea	46	122	28	.230	0	13
Fred Tauby	13	32	4	.125	0	2
Glenn Wright	9	25	3	.120	0	1
Mike Kreevich	6	23	10	.435	0	2
Frank Grube	9	19	7	.368	0	6
Bud Hafey	2	0	0	----	0	0

=== Pitching ===
==== Starting pitchers ====
Note: G = Games pitched; IP = Innings pitched; W = Wins; L = Losses; ERA = Earned run average; SO = Strikeouts

Player	G	IP	W	L	ERA	SO
John Whitehead	28	222.1	13	13	3.72	72
Vern Kennedy	31	211.2	11	11	3.91	65
Ted Lyons	23	190.2	15	8	3.02	54
Les Tietje	30	169.2	9	15	4.30	64
Sam Jones	21	140.0	8	7	4.05	38
Monty Stratton	5	38.0	1	2	4.03	8
George Earnshaw	3	18.0	1	2	9.00	8

==== Other pitchers ====
Note: G = Games pitched; IP = Innings pitched; W = Wins; L = Losses; ERA = Earned run average; SO = Strikeouts

Player	G	IP	W	L	ERA	SO
Ray Phelps	27	125.0	4	8	4.82	38
Carl Fischer	24	88.2	5	5	6.19	31

==== Relief pitchers ====
Note: G = Games pitched; W = Wins; L = Losses; SV = Saves; ERA = Earned run average; SO = Strikeouts

Player	G	W	L	SV	ERA	SO
Whit Wyatt	30	4	3	5	6.75	22
Jack Salveson	20	1	2	1	4.86	22
Joe Vance	10	2	2	0	6.68	12
Italo Chelini	2	0	0	0	12.60	1
Lee Stine	1	0	0	0	9.00	1

== Farm system ==
Level	Team	League	Manager
A	Dallas Steers	Texas League	Byrne James, Harry Faulkner and Alex Gaston
C	Longview Cannibals	West Dixie League	Tex Jeanes
D	Moultrie Steers	Georgia–Florida League	Bob Murray
