= Hal Warnock =

American baseball player (1912-1997)

- Outfielder
- Born: January 6, 1912; New York, U.S.
- Died: February 8, 1997 (aged 85); Tucson, Arizona, U.S.
- Batted: Left Threw: Right

MLB debut
- September 2, 1935, for the St. Louis Browns

Last MLB appearance
- September 18, 1935, for the St. Louis Browns

MLB statistics
- Games played: 6
- At bats: 7
- Hits: 2
- Stats at Baseball Reference

Teams
- St. Louis Browns (1935)

Harold Charles Warnock (January 6, 1912 – February 8, 1997) was an American Major League Baseball player. Warnock played for the St. Louis Browns in the 1935 season. In six games, he had two hits, both of them doubles, with two runs scored. He batted left-handed and he threw right-handed. He was born in New York and died in Tucson, Arizona.

Warnock attended the University of Arizona where he played basketball and baseball for the Wildcats. He graduated from the University of Arizona College of Law in 1935, the same year as his brief Major League stint, and practiced law in Arizona. He later served in the United States Navy during World War II.
