= Sammy Holbrook =

American baseball player

- Catcher
- Born: July 17, 1910; Meridian, Mississippi, U.S.
- Died: April 10, 1991 (aged 80); Jackson, Mississippi, U.S.
- Batted: Right Threw: Right

MLB debut
- April 25, 1935, for the Washington Senators

Last MLB appearance
- September 29, 1935, for the Washington Senators

MLB statistics
- Batting average: .259
- Home runs: 2
- Runs batted in: 25
- Stats at Baseball Reference

Teams
- Washington Senators (1935)

James Marbury "Sammy" Holbrook (July 17, 1910 - April 10, 1991) was an American Major League Baseball catcher. He played one season in the majors, in 1935, for the Washington Senators. That year, he served as the primary backup to starting catcher Cliff Bolton.

Holbrook's minor league baseball career spanned 14 seasons, from 1929 until 1942. In 1939, he served as player-manager of the Federalsburg A's of the Eastern Shore League. Holbrook batted .361 in 98 games while leading the team to the league championship in his only season as manager.

== Sources ==
- Career statistics from Baseball Reference · Baseball Reference (Minors) · Retrosheet · Baseball Almanac
