= Walt Ripley =

American baseball player (1916–1990)

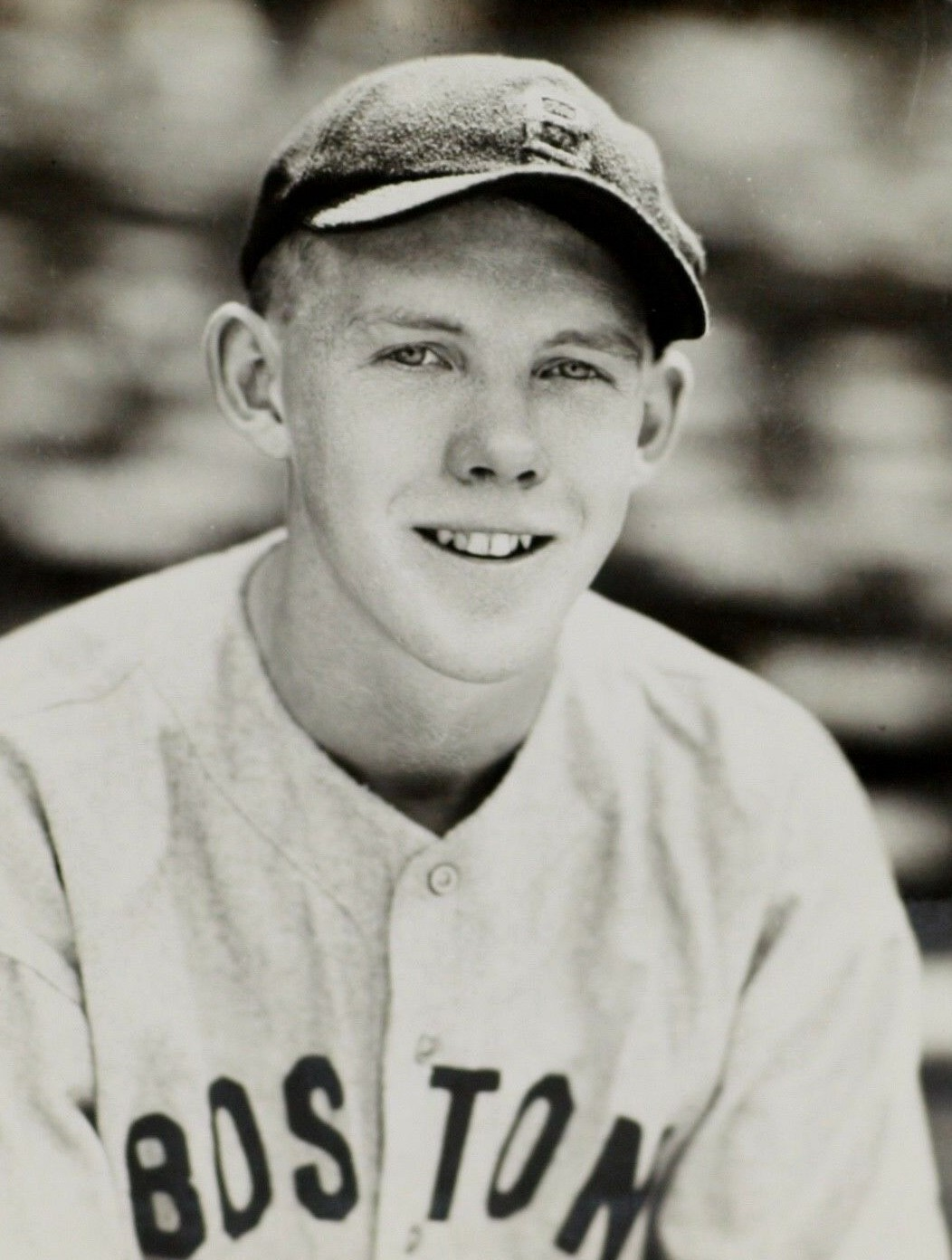
- Pitcher
- Born: November 26, 1916; Worcester, Massachusetts, U.S.
- Died: October 7, 1990 (aged 73); Attleboro, Massachusetts, U.S.
- Batted: Right Threw: Right

MLB debut
- August 17, 1935, for the Boston Red Sox

Last MLB appearance
- September 11, 1935, for the Boston Red Sox

MLB statistics
- Games played: 2
- Innings pitched: 4
- Earned runs: 4
- Stats at Baseball Reference

Teams
- Boston Red Sox (1935)

Walter Franklin Ripley (November 26, 1916 – October 7, 1990) was an American relief pitcher who played in Major League Baseball. Listed at 6 ft 0 in (1.83 m), 168 lb., Ripley batted and threw right-handed.

== Life ==
He was born in Worcester, Massachusetts. His son, Allen Ripley, was also a major league pitcher.

Ripley was 18 years old when he entered the majors in 1935 with the Boston Red Sox, to become the youngest major league player during that season. He broke Smoky Joe Wood's Red Sox record for youngest player by 40 days (Ripley was 18 years, 264 days; Wood was 18 years, 304 days.)

In two relief appearances, Ripley allowed four runs and seven hits, giving up three walks without strikeouts in 4.0 innings of work for a 9.00 earned run average. He did not have a decision or saves and never appeared in a major league game again.

Ripley died in Attleboro, Massachusetts, at the age of 73.

== See also ==
- List of second-generation Major League Baseball players
