= Lou Legett =

American baseball player (1901–1988)

- Catcher
- Born: June 1, 1901; New Orleans, Louisiana, U.S.
- Died: March 6, 1988 (aged 86); New Orleans, Louisiana, U.S.
- Batted: Right Threw: Right

MLB debut
- May 8, 1929, for the Boston Braves

Last MLB appearance
- May 4, 1935, for the Boston Red Sox

MLB statistics
- Batting average: .202
- Home runs: 0
- Runs batted in: 8
- Stats at Baseball Reference

Teams
- Boston Braves (1929); Boston Red Sox (1933–1935)

Louis Alfred (Dutch) Legett (June 1, 1901 – March 6, 1988) was an American backup catcher in Major League Baseball who played for the Boston Braves (1929) and Boston Red Sox (1933–1935). Listed at 5 ft 10 in (1.78 m), 166 lb., Legett batted and threw right-handed. He was born in New Orleans.

In a four-season career, Legett was a .202 hitter (25-for-124) with 13 runs and eight RBI in 68 games, including three doubles and two stolen bases. He did not hit a home run. As a catcher, he recorded 98 outs with 23 assists and committed eight errors in 129 chances for a .938 fielding percentage.

Legget died in his hometown of New Orleans at age 86.

== Transactions ==
- November 7, 1928 – Was one of five players sent by the Chicago Cubs to the Boston Braves in exchange for Rogers Hornsby.
- June 17, 1933 – Purchased by the Boston Red Sox from the Albany Senators (International League)
