= Frankford Plains Cemetery =

Cemetery in Sussex County, New Jersey

Coordinates: 41.1464°N 74.7059°W

Frankford Plains Cemetery is a cemetery located in Frankford Township in Sussex County, New Jersey in the United States. Founded in 1927, it is located on Plains Road in Frankford. The site of the cemetery was once home to a church of timber construction.

== Notable burials ==
- Russ Van Atta (1906–1986), Major League Baseball pitcher (New York Yankees, St. Louis Browns), Sussex County Sheriff (1941–1944)
