= Buck Rogers (baseball) =

American baseball player (1912-1999)

- Pitcher
- Born: November 5, 1912; Spring Garden, Virginia, U.S.
- Died: February 20, 1999 (aged 86); Winston-Salem, North Carolina, U.S.
- Batted: Right Threw: Left

MLB debut
- September 15, 1935, for the Washington Senators

Last MLB appearance
- September 24, 1935, for the Washington Senators

MLB statistics
- Win–loss record: 0-1
- Earned run average: 7.20
- Strikeouts: 7
- Stats at Baseball Reference

Teams
- Washington Senators (1935)

Orlin Woodrow Rogers (November 5, 1912 – February 20, 1999), nicknamed "Buck" or "Lefty", was an American Major League Baseball pitcher who played for the Washington Senators in 1935. He attended college at Virginia where he was a member of Phi Sigma Kappa fraternity.
