= Stew Bowers =

American baseball player (1915–2005)

- Pitcher
- Born: February 26, 1915; New Freedom, Pennsylvania, U.S.
- Died: December 14, 2005 (aged 90); Havertown, Pennsylvania, U.S.
- Batted: Both Threw: Right

MLB debut
- August 5, 1935, for the Boston Red Sox

Last MLB appearance
- May 18, 1937, for the Boston Red Sox

MLB statistics
- Win–loss record: 2–1
- Earned run average: 4.60
- Strikeouts: 5
- Stats at Baseball Reference

Teams
- Boston Red Sox (1935–1937)

Stewart Cole (Doc) Bowers (February 26, 1915 – December 14, 2005) was an American pitcher who played in Major League Baseball from 1935 through 1937. Bowers was a switch hitter and threw right-handed.

== Formative years and family ==
Born in New Freedom, Pennsylvania on February 26, 1915, Stewart C. Bowers was a son of Dr. Stewart C. Bowers and his wife, Jesse. He played baseball at Gettysburg College before being signed by the Boston Red Sox. He was married to Marian C. Kehr. They were the parents of two sons.

== Baseball and later years ==
Bowers reached the majors in 1935 when he signed with the Boston Red Sox. He pitched fifteen games for the Sox between 1935 and 1936, and posted a 2–1 record with a 4.60 ERA and five strikeouts in 29 ⅓ innings, including two starts and one complete game. He also had a single appearance in 1937 as a pinch runner.

Following his baseball career, Bowers served in the United States Army during World War II and later worked for American Insulator Company and for Ford Motor Company. On March 28, 1944, he enlisted in the army.

== Death ==
Bowers died at the age of ninety in Havertown, Pennsylvania on December 14, 2005.
