= 1935 New York Yankees season =

Season for the Major League Baseball team the New York Yankees

1935 New York Yankees
- League: American League
- Ballpark: Yankee Stadium
- City: New York City
- Record: 89–60 (.597)
- League place: 2nd
- Owners: Jacob Ruppert
- General managers: Ed Barrow
- Managers: Joe McCarthy

The 1935 New York Yankees season was the team's 33rd season. The team finished with a record of 89–60, finishing 3 games behind the Detroit Tigers. New York was managed by Joe McCarthy. The Yankees played at Yankee Stadium.

== Offseason ==
- February 26, 1935: Babe Ruth was released by the Yankees.

== Regular season ==
Once again, the Yankees finished second best in the American League, although they came within three games of the eventual world champions, the Detroit Tigers. They were just a season away from starting a four-year dynasty of baseball dominance.

Although Lefty Gomez (12–15) fell off dramatically from his form from the previous four seasons, the Yanks still had the best pitching in the league. The New York staff led the AL in both ERA (3.60) and strikeouts (594). Red Ruffing was the top Yankee winner (16–11) for the first time in five years, followed by Johnny Broaca (15–7), a solid 25-year-old pitcher Johnny Allen (13–6), Johnny Murphy (10–5) and Vito Tamulis (10–5) were also consistent winners.

Before the season, the Yanks released legend Babe Ruth. Ruth, who never cared for Joe McCarthy, had asked Yankee owner Jake Ruppert, if he, Ruth, could manage the team. Ruppert steadfastly refused, and Ruth then asked to be set free. The Yanks worked out a deal with the Boston Braves in which Ruth would join the Braves in many capacities. So when Babe left the Yankees, it was more or less on amicable terms. His departure rendered the club, now Ruthless for the first time since 1919, short on color; home attendance sank to a partly 657,508. second lowest ever in Yankee Stadium.

Lou Gehrig (30 HRs, 120 RBIs, .329) was the only legitimate Yankees power hitter. He led the league in runs scored (125) and walks (132). That was the highest walk total of Gehrig's career-pitchers tended to work around Lou. Earle Combs known as both "The Kentucky Colonel" and "The Mail Carrier" wrapped up his great career. George Selkirk (11 HRs, 94 RBIs, .312) played Ruth's old right field position and performed splendidly. Another youngster Red Rolfe, became the third baseman and hit .300. This Yankee edition still had power, setting a major-league record for the most solo home runs in a single game – six. This was in a June 1 game with the Boston Red Sox (Dickey hit two, Frank Crosetti hit one, Ben Chapman hit one, Selkirk hit one and Rolfe hit one).

=== Season standings ===
American League
Team	W	L	Pct.	GB	Home	Road
Detroit Tigers	93	58	.616	—	53‍–‍25	40‍–‍33
New York Yankees	89	60	.597	3	41‍–‍33	48‍–‍27
Cleveland Indians	82	71	.536	12	48‍–‍29	34‍–‍42
Boston Red Sox	78	75	.510	16	41‍–‍37	37‍–‍38
Chicago White Sox	74	78	.487	19½	42‍–‍34	32‍–‍44
Washington Senators	67	86	.438	27	37‍–‍39	30‍–‍47
St. Louis Browns	65	87	.428	28½	31‍–‍44	34‍–‍43
Philadelphia Athletics	58	91	.389	34	30‍–‍42	28‍–‍49

=== Record vs. opponents ===
1935 American League record Sources:
Team	BOS	CWS	CLE	DET	NYY	PHA	SLB	WSH
Boston	—	13–9	9–13–1	9–13	9–12	16–6	10–12	12–10
Chicago	9–13	—	10–12	11–11	9–11	12–10	11–11–1	12–10
Cleveland	13–9–1	12–10	—	7–15–1	8–14	12–10	15–6–1	15–7
Detroit	13–9	11–11	15–7–1	—	11–11	14–5	17–5	12–10
New York	12–9	11–9	14–8	11–11	—	14–6	12–10	15–7
Philadelphia	6–16	10–12	10–12	5–14	6–14	—	11–11	10–12
St. Louis	12–10	11–11–1	6–15–1	5–17	10–12	11–11	—	10–11–1
Washington	10–12	10–12	7–15	10–12	7–15	12–10	11–10–1	—

=== Roster ===
1935 New York Yankees
Roster
Pitchers: 18 Johnny Allen; 20 Johnny Broaca; 17 Jumbo Brown; 16 Jimmie DeShong; 11 Lefty Gomez; 21 Pat Malone; 19 Johnny Murphy; 15 Red Ruffing; 22 Vito Tamulis; 14 Russ Van Atta	Catchers: 8 Bill Dickey; 26 Joe Glenn; 9 Arndt Jorgens; Infielders: 5 Frankie Crosetti; 4 Lou Gehrig; 10 Don Heffner; 6 Tony Lazzeri; 5 Nolen Richardson; 2 Red Rolfe; 27 Blondy Ryan; 12 Jack Saltzgaver	Outfielders: 7 Ben Chapman; 1 Earle Combs; 25 Jesse Hill; 28 Myril Hoag; 3 George Selkirk; 27 Dixie Walker	Manager: -- Joe McCarthy; Coaches: 1 Earle Combs; 29 Art Fletcher; 31 Johnny Schulte; 30 Joe Sewell

== Player stats ==
=== Batting ===
==== Starters by position ====
Note: Pos = Position; G = Games played; AB = At bats; H = Hits; Avg. = Batting average; HR = Home runs; RBI = Runs batted in

Pos	Player	G	AB	H	Avg.	HR	RBI
C	Bill Dickey	120	448	125	.279	14	81
1B	Lou Gehrig	149	535	176	.329	30	120
2B	Tony Lazzeri	130	477	130	.273	13	83
3B	Red Rolfe	149	639	192	.300	5	67
SS	Frankie Crosetti	87	305	78	.256	8	50
OF	Ben Chapman	140	553	160	.289	8	74
OF	George Selkirk	128	491	153	.312	11	94
OF	Jess Hill	107	392	115	.293	4	33

==== Other batters ====
Note: G = Games played; AB = At bats; H = Hits; Avg. = Batting average; HR = Home runs; RBI = Runs batted in

Player	G	AB	H	Avg.	HR	RBI
Earle Combs	89	298	84	.282	3	35
Jack Saltzgaver	61	149	39	.262	3	18
Myril Hoag	48	110	28	.255	1	13
Blondy Ryan	30	105	25	.238	0	11
Arndt Jorgens	36	84	20	.238	0	6
Nolen Richardson	12	46	10	.217	0	5
Joe Glenn	17	43	10	.233	0	6
Don Heffner	10	36	11	.306	0	8
Dixie Walker	8	13	2	.154	0	1

=== Pitching ===
==== Starting pitchers ====
Note: G = Games pitched; IP = Innings pitched; W = Wins; L = Losses; ERA = Earned run average; SO = Strikeouts

Player	G	IP	W	L	ERA	SO
Lefty Gomez	34	246.0	12	15	3.18	138
Red Ruffing	30	222.0	16	11	3.12	81
Johnny Broaca	29	201.0	15	7	3.58	78
Johnny Allen	23	167.0	13	6	3.61	113
Vito Tamulis	30	160.2	10	5	4.09	57

==== Other pitchers ====
Note: G = Games pitched; IP = Innings pitched; W = Wins; L = Losses; ERA = Earned run average; SO = Strikeouts

Player	G	IP	W	L	ERA	SO
Johnny Murphy	40	117.0	10	5	4.08	28
Jumbo Brown	20	87.1	6	5	3.61	41

==== Relief pitchers ====
Note: G = Games pitched; W = Wins; L = Losses; SV = Saves; ERA = Earned run average; SO = Strikeouts

Player	G	W	L	SV	ERA	SO
Jimmie DeShong	29	4	1	3	3.26	30
Pat Malone	29	3	5	3	5.43	25
Russ Van Atta	5	0	0	0	3.86	3

== Farm system ==
Level	Team	League	Manager
AA	Newark Bears	International League	Bob Shawkey
AA	Oakland Oaks	Pacific Coast League	Ossie Vitt
A	Binghamton Triplets	New York–Pennsylvania League	Billy Meyer
B	Norfolk Tars	Piedmont League	Bill Skiff
C	Akron Yankees	Middle Atlantic League	Johnny Neun
C	Joplin Miners	Western Association	Runt Marr and Stanley Hino
D	Bassett Furniture Makers	Bi-State League	Lefty Jenkins
D	Washington Generals	Pennsylvania State Association	Benny Bengough

LEAGUE CHAMPIONS: Binghamton
