= George Hockette =

American baseball player (1908–1974)

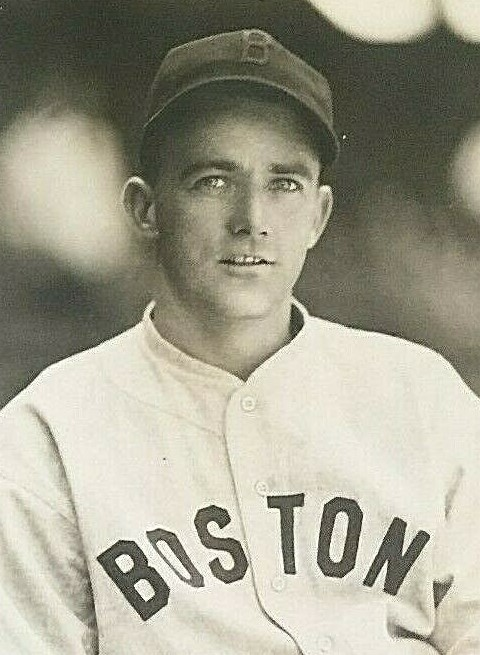
- Pitcher
- Born: April 7, 1908; Perth, Mississippi
- Died: January 20, 1974 (aged 65); Plantation, Florida
- Batted: Left Threw: Left

MLB debut
- September 17, 1934, for the Boston Red Sox

Last MLB appearance
- August 5, 1935, for the Boston Red Sox

MLB statistics
- Win–loss record: 4–4
- Earned run average: 4.08
- Strikeouts: 25

Teams
- Boston Red Sox (1934–1935)

George Edward Hockette [Lefty] (April 7, 1908 – January 20, 1974) was a pitcher in Major League Baseball who played from 1934 through 1935 for the Boston Red Sox. Listed at 6 ft 0 in (1.83 m), 174 lb., Hockette batted and threw left-handed. He was born in Perth, Mississippi.

Over parts of two seasons, Hockette posted a 4–4 record with a 4.08 ERA in 26 appearances, including seven starts, three complete games, eight games finished, 25 strikeouts and 28 walks in 88⅓ innings of work.

Hockette died in Plantation, Florida at age 65.

== Sources ==
- Baseball Reference
