= Ab Wright =

American baseball and football player (1905–1995)

- Outfielder
- Born: November 16, 1905; Terlton, Oklahoma, U.S.
- Died: May 23, 1995 (aged 89); Muskogee, Oklahoma, U.S.
- Batted: Right Threw: Right

MLB debut
- April 20, 1935, for the Cleveland Indians

Last MLB appearance
- October 1, 1944, for the Boston Braves

MLB statistics
- Batting average: .248
- Home runs: 9
- Runs batted in: 53
- Stats at Baseball Reference

Teams
- Cleveland Indians (1935); Boston Braves (1944)

Albert Owen "Ab" Wright (November 16, 1905 – May 23, 1995) was an American professional baseball outfielder and a National Football League tailback. He went to college at Oklahoma State University, then played for the Frankford Yellow Jackets in the NFL in 1930. He then played two seasons in Major League Baseball, one for the Cleveland Indians in 1935, and one for the Boston Braves in 1944. He had an extensive minor league baseball career, lasting from 1928 until 1946.
