= Eddie Phillips (catcher) =

American baseball player (1901–1968)

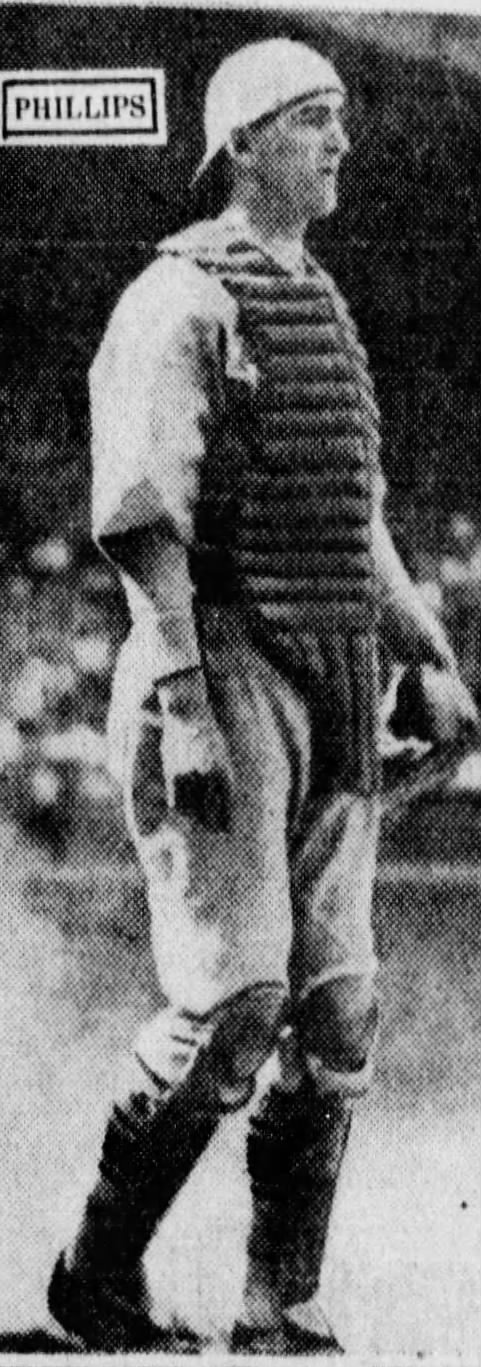
- Phillips in 1929
- Catcher
- Born: February 17, 1901; Worcester, Massachusetts, U.S.
- Died: January 26, 1968 (aged 66); Buffalo, New York, U.S.
- Batted: Right Threw: Right

MLB debut
- May 4, 1924, for the Boston Braves

Last MLB appearance
- September 29, 1935, for the Cleveland Indians

MLB statistics
- Batting average: .237
- Home runs: 14
- Runs batted in: 126
- Stats at Baseball Reference

Teams
- Boston Braves (1924); Detroit Tigers (1929); Pittsburgh Pirates (1931); New York Yankees (1932); Washington Senators (1934); Cleveland Indians (1935)

Career highlights and awards
- World Series champion (1932)

Edward David Phillips (February 17, 1901 – January 26, 1968) was an American professional baseball catcher. He played in Major League Baseball (MLB) from 1924 through 1935 for the Boston Braves, Detroit Tigers, Pittsburgh Pirates, New York Yankees, Washington Senators, and Cleveland Indians. Phillips was born in Worcester, Massachusetts. He batted and threw right-handed.

He helped the Yankees win the 1932 World Series.

In 6 seasons he played in 312 games and had 997 at bats, 82 runs, 236 hits, 54 doubles, 6 triples, 14 home runs, 126 RBI, 3 stolen bases, 104 walks, .237 batting average, .312 on-base percentage, .345 slugging percentage, 344 total bases and 15 sacrifice hits.

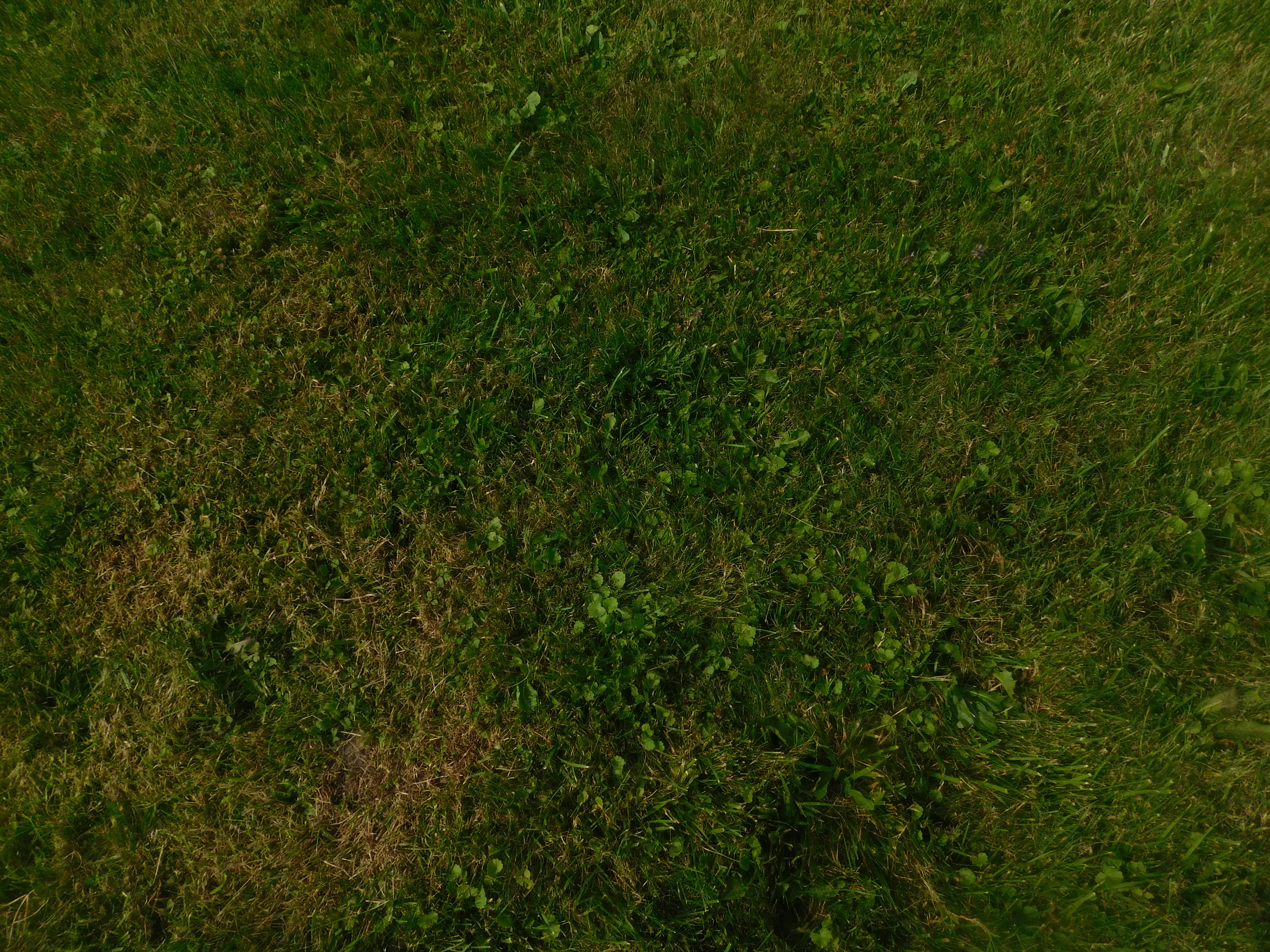
The unmarked gravesite of Phillips in Cheektowaga, New York

He died in Buffalo, New York at the age of 66.

== Sources ==
- Career statistics from Baseball Reference · Retrosheet · Baseball Almanac
