= John Mihalic =

American baseball player (1911–1987)

- Second baseman
- Born: September 13, 1911; Cleveland, Ohio, U.S.
- Died: April 24, 1987 (aged 75); Fort Oglethorpe, Georgia, U.S.
- Batted: Right Threw: Right

MLB debut
- September 18, 1935, for the Washington Senators

Last MLB appearance
- September 12, 1937, for the Washington Senators

MLB statistics
- Batting average: .244
- Home runs: 0
- Runs batted in: 22
- Stats at Baseball Reference

Teams
- Washington Senators (1935–1937)

John Michael Mihalic (November 13, 1911 – April 24, 1987) was an American Major League Baseball (MLB) second baseman who played for the Washington Senators from 1935 to 1937.
