= Jack Redmond =

American baseball player (1910–1968)

- Catcher
- Born: September 3, 1910; Florence, Arizona, U.S.
- Died: July 27, 1968 (aged 57); Garland, Texas, U.S.
- Batted: Left Threw: Right

MLB debut
- April 22, 1935, for the Washington Senators

Last MLB appearance
- August 31, 1935, for the Washington Senators

MLB statistics
- Batting average: .176
- Home runs: 1
- Runs batted in: 7
- Stats at Baseball Reference

Teams
- Washington Senators (1935)

John McKittrick Redmond (September 3, 1910 – July 27, 1968) was an American professional baseball player. He was a catcher for one season (1935) with the Washington Senators. For his career, he compiled a .176 batting average in 34 at-bats, with one home run and seven runs batted in.

An alumnus of the University of Arizona, he was born in Florence, Arizona and died in Garland, Texas at the age of 57.
