= Fred Tauby =

American baseball player (1906–1955)

- Outfielder
- Born: March 27, 1906; Canton, Ohio, U.S.
- Died: November 23, 1955 (aged 49); Concord, California, U.S.
- Batted: Right Threw: Right

MLB debut
- September 1, 1935, for the Chicago White Sox

Last MLB appearance
- June 2, 1937, for the Philadelphia Phillies

MLB statistics
- Games played: 24
- Hits: 4
- Batting average: .077
- Stats at Baseball Reference

Teams
- Chicago White Sox (1935); Philadelphia Phillies (1937)

Frederick Joseph Tauby (born Taubensee; March 27, 1906 – November 23, 1955) was an American professional baseball outfielder in Major League Baseball. He played in 1935 and 1937 with the Chicago White Sox and the Philadelphia Phillies. He batted and threw right-handed. Tauby had a .077 career batting average, with four hits in 54 at-bats.

Tauby was born in Canton, Ohio to German parents. Early in his career, he signed a contract with the Detroit Tigers but badly injured his knee while playing in the minors for the Beaumont Exporters and was released by the Tigers. By 1934, he legally changed his surname to Tauby. He died in Concord, California.
