= Bill Starr =

American baseball player (1911-1991)

Bill "Chick" Starr
- Catcher
- Born: February 16, 1911; Brooklyn, New York, U.S.
- Died: August 12, 1991 (aged 80); La Jolla, California, U.S.
- Batted: Right Threw: Right

MLB debut
- August 23, 1935, for the Washington Senators

Last MLB appearance
- June 20, 1936, for the Washington Senators

MLB statistics
- Batting average: .208
- Home runs: 0
- Runs batted in: 1
- Stats at Baseball Reference

Teams
- Washington Senators (1935–36)

William "Chick" Starr (February 16, 1911 – August 12, 1991) was an American Major League Baseball catcher. He played in parts of two seasons, 1935 and 1936, for the Washington Senators.

He was born in Brooklyn, New York, and was Jewish. He attended James Medill High School in Chicago, Illinois.
