= Al McLean (baseball) =

American baseball player (1912–1990)

- Pitcher
- Born: September 20, 1912; Chicago, Illinois, U.S.
- Died: September 29, 1990 (aged 78); Asheboro, North Carolina, U.S.
- Batted: Right Threw: Right

MLB debut
- July 16, 1935, for the Washington Senators

Last MLB appearance
- July 30, 1935, for the Washington Senators

MLB statistics
- Win–loss record: 0-0
- Strikeouts: 0
- Earned run average: 7.27
- Stats at Baseball Reference

Teams
- Washington Senators (1935)

Albert Eldon McLean (September 20, 1912 – September 29, 1990) was an American Major League Baseball pitcher. He pitched in four games for the Washington Senators in 1935, all in relief.

== Sources ==
- Career statistics from Baseball Reference · Baseball Reference (Minors) · Retrosheet · Baseball Almanac
