= Jack Salveson =

American baseball player (1914–1974)

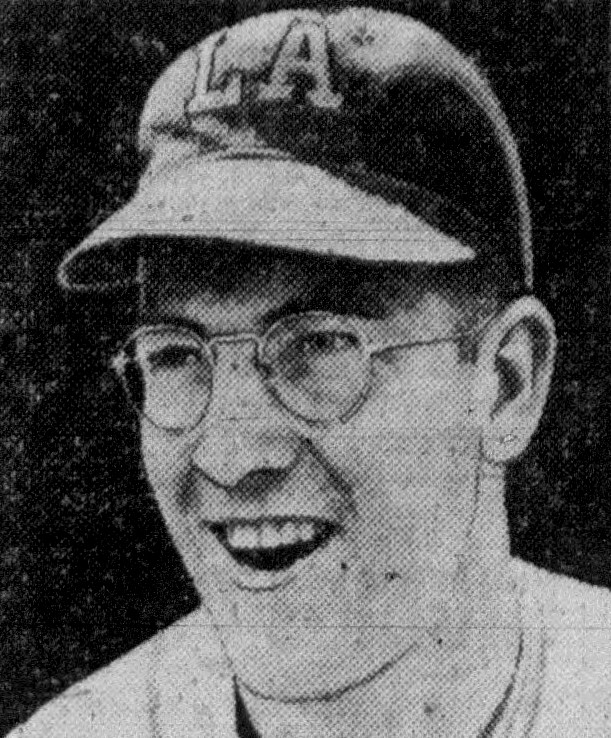
- Salveson, circa 1942
- Pitcher
- Born: January 5, 1914; Fullerton, California, U.S.
- Died: December 28, 1974 (aged 60); Norwalk, California, U.S.
- Batted: Right Threw: Right

MLB debut
- June 3, 1933, for the New York Giants

Last MLB appearance
- September 16, 1945, for the Cleveland Indians

MLB statistics
- Win–loss record: 9–9
- Earned run average: 3.99
- Strikeouts: 85
- Stats at Baseball Reference

Teams
- New York Giants (1933–1934); Pittsburgh Pirates (1935); Chicago White Sox (1935); Cleveland Indians (1943, 1945)

John Theodore Salveson (January 5, 1914 – December 28, 1974) was an American Major League Baseball pitcher who played for five seasons. He played for the New York Giants from 1933 to 1934, the Pittsburgh Pirates and the Chicago White Sox in 1935, and the Cleveland Indians in 1943 and 1945.

Salveson had a long and successful minor league career, spanning 22 years. From 1936 to 1942 and 1946 to 1953 he pitched in the Pacific Coast League, where he won 204 games. In 1942, he won 24 games with the Oakland Oaks, enough to earn him a shot at the majors for the first time in eight years.

During his career, Salveson was known for his efficiency, once pitching a full game in just one hour, twenty minutes, and another time completed a game with just 54 pitches. Long-time PCL star Lefty O'Doul dubbed him "the great conservationist".

Salveson was a good hitting pitcher in his brief major league career. He posted a .260 batting average (20-for-77) with 8 runs, 5 doubles, 3 home runs and 10 RBI. He recorded a .976 fielding percentage with only two errors in 83 total chances.

Salveson also appeared in the movie Pride of the Yankees as a pitcher who hit Lou Gehrig (played by Gary Cooper) in the head with a pitch.
