= Henry Coppola =

American baseball player (1912-1990)

- Pitcher
- Born: August 4, 1912; East Douglas, Massachusetts, U.S.
- Died: July 10, 1990 (aged 77); Norfolk, Massachusetts, U.S.
- Batted: Right Threw: Right

MLB debut
- April 19, 1935, for the Washington Senators

Last MLB appearance
- May 7, 1936, for the Washington Senators

MLB statistics
- Win–loss record: 3–4
- Earned run average: 5.65
- Strikeouts: 21
- Stats at Baseball Reference

Teams
- Washington Senators (1935–1936)

Henry Peter Coppola (August 4, 1912 – July 10, 1990) was an American pitcher who played Major League Baseball for the Washington Senators in 1935 and 1936.
