= Lee Stine =

American baseball player (1913–2005)

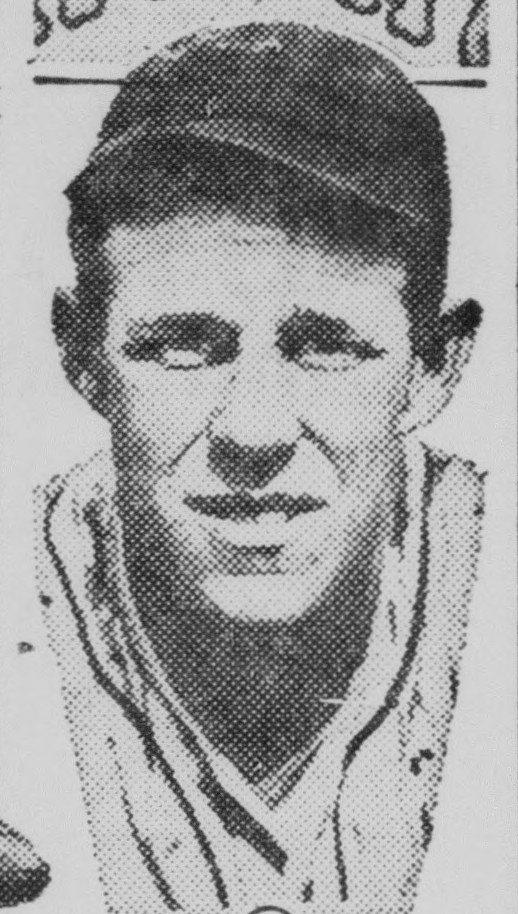
- Stine, circa 1934
- Pitcher
- Born: November 17, 1913; Stillwater, Oklahoma, U.S.
- Died: May 6, 2005 (aged 91); Hemet, California, U.S.
- Batted: Right Threw: Right

MLB debut
- April 17, 1934, for the Chicago White Sox

Last MLB appearance
- May 13, 1938, for the New York Yankees

MLB statistics
- Win–loss record: 3–8
- Earned run average: 5.09
- Strikeouts: 38
- Stats at Baseball Reference

Teams
- Chicago White Sox (1934–1935); Cincinnati Reds (1936); New York Yankees (1938)

Lee Elbert Stine (November 17, 1913 – May 6, 2005) was an American right-handed pitcher in Major League Baseball who played for the Chicago White Sox (1934–35), Cincinnati Reds (1936) and New York Yankees (1938).

Stine was born in Stillwater, Oklahoma. He signed with the San Francisco Seals of the Pacific Coast League when he was just 16. Eventually, he debuted in the major leagues with the Chicago White Sox in 1934. In a four-season career, he posted a 3–8 record with 39 strikeouts and a 5.09 ERA in 143 1/3 innings.

Stine is best known for his historic role in pitching Lou Gehrig's 14th grand slam in 1934. After two years in Chicago, he played for the Reds in 1936, compiling a career high 121 2/3 innings with a 3–8 record and a 5.03 ERA. Injured a year later, he returned in 1938, pitching briefly for the Yankees.

Plagued by tendinitis and injuries, Stine returned to California to play for the Los Angeles Angels of the PCL in 1940. By 1943 he had joined the Navy during World War II and after discharge settled in Long Beach. He later worked as a parimutuel clerk.

Stine died in Hemet, California, due to complications from a stroke, at age 91.
