= Bobby Burke =

American baseball player (1907-1971)

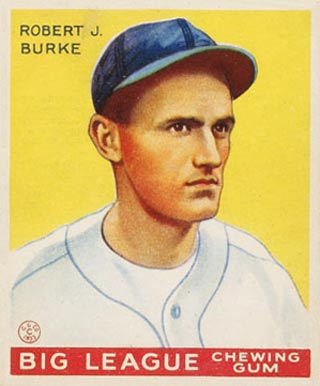
- Pitcher
- Born: January 23, 1907; Joliet, Illinois, U.S.
- Died: February 8, 1971 (aged 64); Joliet, Illinois, U.S.
- Batted: Left Threw: Left

MLB debut
- April 16, 1927, for the Washington Senators

Last MLB appearance
- May 4, 1937, for the Philadelphia Phillies

MLB statistics
- Win–loss record: 38–46
- Earned run average: 4.28
- Strikeouts: 299
- Stats at Baseball Reference

Teams
- Washington Senators (1927–1935); Philadelphia Phillies (1937)

Career highlights and awards
- Pitched a no-hitter on August 8, 1931

Robert James Burke (January 23, 1907 – February 8, 1971) was an American pitcher for the Washington Senators and Philadelphia Phillies.

Burke helped the Senators win the 1933 American League Pennant.

In 10 seasons Burke had a 38–46 win–loss record, appearing in 254 games, starting 88 of them, pitching 27 complete games, tossing 4 shutouts, finishing 93 games, earning 5 saves, 918 2/3 innings pitched, allowing 926 hits, allowing 506 runs (437 earned), surrendering 35 home runs, walking 360, striking our 299, hitting 24 batsmen, 16 wild pitches, facing 3,985 batters, 3 balks and a 4.28 ERA.

On August 8, 1931, while with the Senators, Burke no-hit the Boston Red Sox 5–0 at Griffith Stadium. It was the last no-hitter by a Washington-area Major League Baseball team until Jordan Zimmermann on September 28, 2014.

Burke died on February 8, 1971, aged 64.

== See also ==
- List of Major League Baseball no-hitters

Preceded by Wes Ferrell	No-hitter pitcher August 8, 1931	Succeeded by Paul Dean
