= Jim Hayes (baseball) =

American baseball player (1913-1993)

- Pitcher
- Born: February 11, 1913; Montevallo, Alabama, U.S.
- Died: November 27, 1993 (aged 80); Decatur, Georgia, U.S.
- Batted: Left Threw: Right

MLB debut
- July 13, 1935, for the Washington Senators

Last MLB appearance
- August 10, 1935, for the Washington Senators

MLB statistics
- Win–loss record: 2-4
- Earned run average: 8.36
- Strikeouts: 9
- Stats at Baseball Reference

Teams
- Washington Senators (1935)

James Millard Hayes (February 11, 1913 – November 27, 1993), nicknamed "Whitey", was an American pitcher in Major League Baseball. He played for the Washington Senators.
