= Mel Mazzera =

American baseball player (1914–1997)

- Outfielder
- Born: January 31, 1914; Stockton, California, U.S.
- Died: December 17, 1997 (aged 83); Stockton, California, U.S.
- Batted: Left Threw: Left

MLB debut
- September 9, 1935, for the St. Louis Browns

Last MLB appearance
- September 29, 1940, for the Philadelphia Phillies

MLB statistics
- Batting average: .268
- Home runs: 10
- Runs batted in: 66
- Stats at Baseball Reference

Teams
- St. Louis Browns (1935, 1937–1939); Philadelphia Phillies (1940)

Melvin Leonard "Mike" Mazzera (January 31, 1914 – December 17, 1997) was an American professional baseball player. In an 11-year career, Mazzera participated in five Major League seasons: four with the St. Louis Browns and one with the Philadelphia Phillies. He was officially listed as standing 5 feet 11 inches (180 cm) and weighing 180 pounds (82 kg).

== Biography ==
=== Early life ===
Mazzera was born "Melvin Leonard Mazzera" on January 31, 1914, in Stockton, California.

=== Career ===
In 1933, Mazzera began his professional baseball career playing for the C-level San Antonio Missions. That year, Mazzera also played for the Baton Rouge Solons of the Dixie League, recording a combined batting average of .320 in 124 games played. Mazzera continued his minor-league career in 1934, playing for both the Palestine Pals of Palestine, Texas, and the San Antonio Missions. In 1935, Mazzera participated in 154 games for the San Antonio Missions while making his Major League debut for the St. Louis Browns on September 9, 1935. For his debut, Mazzera replaced Ed Coleman as a pinch runner.

Mazzera spent the entire 1936 season and the majority of the 1937 season with the San Antonio Missions, recording 96 hits, 13 doubles, and four home runs for the Missions in 1936 while recording 134 hits and nine home runs for them in 1937.

Mazzera's 1938 season was spent with the St. Louis Browns. In 86 games played, Mazzera batted for a .279 average with six home runs and twenty-five strikeouts, helping the Browns to finish seventh in the American League with a 55–97 record. Mazzera played in 33 games for the Browns, but also played for the Philadelphia Phillies double-A affiliate, the Toronto Maple Leafs, later that season. Mazzera made his Philies debut in 1940, playing in 69 games for the Phillies. In his only season as a Phillie, Mazzera recorded a .237 batting average with fifteen strikeouts, nineteen walks, and thirteen runs batted in.

In 1940, Mazzera was signed by the San Diego Padres of the Pacific Coast League. Mazzera played for the Padres in the 1941, 1942, and 1944 seasons. In 1942, Mazzera led the Padres in home runs, runs batted in, doubles, and triples, leading to the observance of a "Mel Mazzera Day" on August 30, 1942.

=== After baseball ===
Mazzera died on December 17, 1997, in Stockton, California, and was buried in San Joaquin Cemetery in Stockton.
