= Phil Hensiek =

American baseball player (1901-1972)

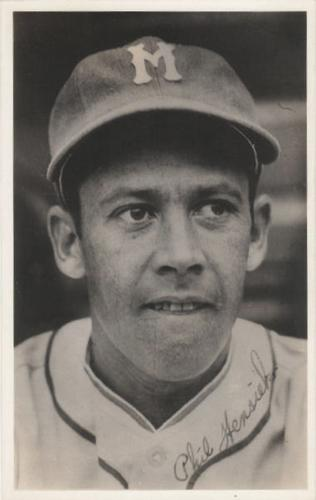
- Pitcher
- Born: October 13, 1901; St. Louis, Missouri, U.S.
- Died: February 21, 1972 (aged 70); St. Louis, Missouri, U.S.
- Batted: Right Threw: Right

MLB debut
- August 15, 1935, for the Washington Senators

Last MLB appearance
- September 2, 1935, for the Washington Senators

MLB statistics
- Win–loss record: 0–3
- Earned run average: 9.69
- Strikeouts: 6
- Stats at Baseball Reference

Teams
- Washington Senators (1935)

Philip Frank Hensiek (October 13, 1901 – February 21, 1972), nicknamed "Sid", was an American pitcher in Major League Baseball. He played for the Washington Senators in 1935.
