= Tommy Heath (baseball) =

American baseball player

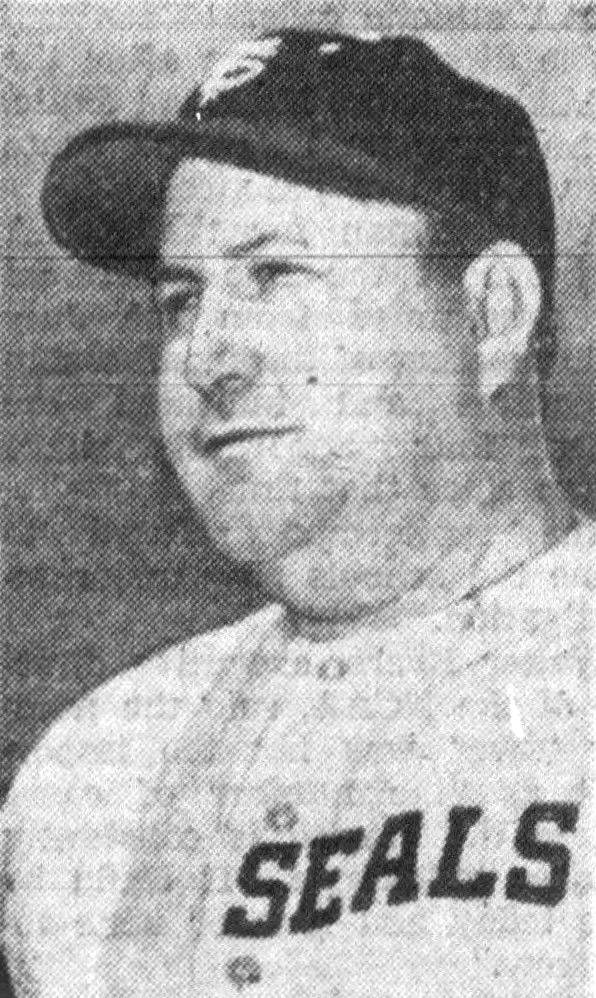
- Catcher
- Born: August 18, 1913; Akron, Colorado, U.S.
- Died: May 19, 2026 (aged 112); Los Gatos, California, U.S.
- Batted: Right Threw: Right

MLB debut
- April 23, 1935, for the St. Louis Browns

Last MLB appearance
- September 18, 1938, for the St. Louis Browns

MLB statistics
- Batting average: .230
- Home runs: 3
- Runs batted in: 34
- Stats at Baseball Reference

Teams
- St. Louis Browns (1935, 1937–38)

Thomas George Heath (August 18, 1913 – February 26, 1967) was an American catcher and scout in Major League Baseball and a manager in minor league baseball. He played in parts of three seasons in the majors between 1935 and 1938, all for the St. Louis Browns. He was a United States Army veteran of World War II.

Heath stood 5 feet 10 inches (1.78 m) tall and weighed 185 pounds (84 kg) and batted and threw right-handed during his playing days. He appeared in 134 total MLB games for the Browns, compiling a batting average of .230 in 330 at bats with 76 hits (including three home runs) and 34 runs batted in.

Heath was somewhat better known for his 18-year career as a minor league manager (1947–1964), where he principally worked in the New York Giants and Los Angeles Angels farm systems, and in between piloted four Pacific Coast League clubs between 1952 and 1961. As the leader of the Giants' Minneapolis Millers Triple-A affiliate (1949–1951), he managed future major leaguers such as Willie Mays and Hoyt Wilhelm — both members of the Baseball Hall of Fame. In 1948, he managed the Trenton Giants to the Interstate League championship, the only title he won during his managerial career.

Heath served as a scout for the Angels after his managing career ended. He died at age 53 in Los Gatos, California.

Sporting positions
Preceded by Billy Herman	Minneapolis Millers manager 1949–1951	Succeeded by Frank Genovese
Preceded by Lefty O'Doul	San Francisco Seals manager 1952–1955	Succeeded by Eddie Joost
Preceded by Tony Freitas	Sacramento Solons manager 1956–1957	Succeeded by Sibby Sisti
Preceded by Bill Posedel; Larry Jansen	Portland Beavers manager 1958; 1959–1960	Succeeded by Larry Jansen; Vern Benson
Preceded by Franchise established	Hawaii Islanders manager 1961	Succeeded by Bill Werle
