= Lyn Lary =

American baseball player (1906–1973)

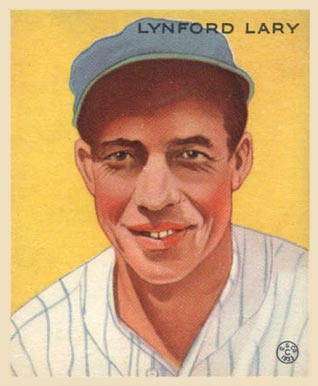
- Shortstop
- Born: January 28, 1906; Armona, California, U.S.
- Died: January 9, 1973 (aged 66); Downey, California, U.S.
- Batted: Right Threw: Right

MLB debut
- May 11, 1929, for the New York Yankees

Last MLB appearance
- August 7, 1940, for the St. Louis Browns

MLB statistics
- Batting average: .269
- Home runs: 38
- Runs batted in: 526
- Stats at Baseball Reference

Teams
- New York Yankees (1929–1934); Boston Red Sox (1934); Washington Senators (1935); St. Louis Browns (1935–1936); Cleveland Indians (1937–1939); Brooklyn Dodgers (1939); St. Louis Cardinals (1939); St. Louis Browns (1940)

Career highlights and awards
- World Series champion (1932); AL stolen base leader (1936)

Lynford Horbart Lary (January 28, 1906 – January 9, 1973), nicknamed "Broadway", was an American professional baseball shortstop. He played twelve seasons in Major League Baseball (MLB) for the New York Yankees, Boston Red Sox, Washington Senators, St. Louis Browns, Cleveland Indians, Brooklyn Dodgers, and St. Louis Cardinals. In a 12-season career, Lary posted a .269 batting average with 38 home runs and 526 RBIs in 1,302 games played.

A well-traveled shortstop, Lary played for six different teams in a span of twelve years, including two stints with the St. Louis Browns and playing for three teams in 1939. A good defensive player, he had good hands with a strong arm and was competent on the double play. Primarily a singles hitter, his hustle on the bases was shown by taking an extra base or for breaking up a double play. He ended his career with a 1.50 walk-to-strikeout ratio (705-to-470).

Lary debuted with the New York Yankees in 1929, finishing with a .309 average. The next season, he hit .289, and .280 in 1931. That season, he collected 107 RBIs, the most ever by a Yankees shortstop, and was one of six Yankees to have at least 100 runs scored. Lou Gehrig, Babe Ruth, Ben Chapman, Earle Combs and Joe Sewell were the others. Lary also had career-numbers in home runs (10) and triples (nine).

From 1934 through 1936 he played for the Yankees, Boston Red Sox, St, Louis Browns and Washington Senators. Before the 1935 season, he was traded by the Red Sox to the Washington Senators in exchange for future Hall of Famer Joe Cronin. Playing for the 1936 Browns, he hit .289 with 112 runs and led the American League with 37 stolen bases and 155 games played. In 1937 with the Cleveland Indians, he batted .290 with 110 runs and posted career-highs in hits (187) and doubles (46).

In 1939, Lary started with Cleveland, was traded to the Brooklyn Dodgers in the midseason, then returned to St. Louis for the rest of the year. He retired in 1940, after a part-time season for the Browns.

He married actress Mary Lawlor. They had a son. Lary died in Downey, California, at age 66.

== See also ==
- List of Major League Baseball annual stolen base leaders
- List of Major League Baseball career stolen bases leaders
- List of Major League Baseball career putouts as a shortstop leaders
