= Gordon Rhodes =

American baseball player (1907–1960)

- Pitcher
- Born: August 11, 1907; Winnemucca, Nevada, U.S.
- Died: March 22, 1960 (aged 52); Bellflower, California, U.S.
- Batted: Right Threw: Right

MLB debut
- April 29, 1929, for the New York Yankees

Last MLB appearance
- September 7, 1936, for the Philadelphia Athletics

MLB statistics
- Win–loss record: 43–74
- Earned run average: 4.85
- Strikeouts: 356
- Stats at Baseball Reference

Teams
- New York Yankees (1929–1932); Boston Red Sox (1932–1935); Philadelphia Athletics (1936)

John Gordon Rhodes (August 11, 1907 – March 22, 1960) was an American professional baseball pitcher who played in Major League Baseball (MLB) from 1929 to 1936. He played for the New York Yankees, Boston Red Sox, and Philadelphia Athletics. Listed at 6 feet 0 inches (1.83 m) and 187 pounds (85 kg), he batted and threw right-handed.

== Biography ==
Rhodes played four sports—baseball, basketball, football, and track—at West High School in Salt Lake City, and then attended the University of Utah for a year before signing a professional baseball contract. His baseball career spanned 12 years, 1928 to 1939; he spent parts of eight seasons in the major leagues (appearing in 203 games) and parts of seven seasons in the minor leagues (appearing in 174 games).

Rhodes made his major league debut in April 1929 at age 21, after his contract was purchased by the New York Yankees from the Hollywood Stars of the Pacific Coast League. During parts of four seasons, he went 7–9 in 41 games (17 starts) with the Yankees. He was then traded to Boston in August 1932, in the same transaction that brought Wilcy Moore to the Yankees.

Rhodes spent parts of four seasons with the Red Sox, recording a career-high total of wins, 12, in both 1932 and 1933. However, he did not have a winning record in any of his years with Boston, compiling a 27–45 record in 124 games (90 starts) with the Red Sox.

Rhodes, minor league catcher George Savino, and cash were sent to the Philadelphia Athletics in December 1935, in a deal that brought Jimmie Foxx and Johnny Marcum to Boston. With the Athletics, Rhodes collected 9 wins in 1936, but led American League pitchers with 20 losses and 26 home runs allowed.

During his major league career, Rhodes posted a 43–74 record with 356 strikeouts and a 4.85 ERA in 200 appearances, including 135 starts, 47 complete games, one shutout, four saves, and 1048 2/3 innings of work. As a hitter, he had a .194 batting average (69-for-356) with two home runs and 34 runs batted in.

Nicknamed "Dusty", Rhodes was born in Salt Lake City, Utah; he died at the age of 52 in Bellflower, California. Rhodes was inducted to the Utah Sports Hall of Fame in 1982.

== Notes ==
Rhodes' places of birth and death are listed as they appear in baseball sources. An alternate source with a family connection to Rhodes has given his place of birth as Winnemucca, Nevada, and place of death as Long Beach, California. Rhodes' draft registration card, which he signed in October 1940, lists his place of birth as Salt Lake City. Long Beach was noted as his place of death in contemporary news reports; Long Beach and Bellflower are adjacent communities.
