= Belve Bean =

American baseball player (1905–1988)

- Pitcher
- Born: April 25, 1905; Mullin, Texas, U.S.
- Died: June 1, 1988 (aged 83); Comanche, Texas, U.S.
- Batted: Right Threw: Right

MLB debut
- May 30, 1930, for the Cleveland Indians

Last MLB appearance
- June 27, 1935, for the Washington Senators

MLB statistics
- Win–loss record: 11–7
- Earned run average: 5.32
- Strikeouts: 89
- Stats at Baseball Reference

Teams
- Cleveland Indians (1930–1931, 1933–1935); Washington Senators (1935)

Belveric Benton Bean (April 25, 1905 – June 1, 1988) was an American Major League Baseball pitcher who played for five seasons. Nicknamed "Bill", he played for the Cleveland Indians from 1930 to 1935 and the Washington Senators in 1935.
