= Gene Hayden =

American baseball player (1935-2003)

- Pitcher
- Born: April 14, 1935; San Francisco, California, US
- Died: June 13, 2003 (aged 68); Lodi, California, US
- Batted: Left Threw: Left

MLB debut
- June 26, 1958, for the Cincinnati Redlegs

Last MLB appearance
- July 6, 1958, for the Cincinnati Redlegs

MLB statistics
- Win–loss record: 0–0
- Earned run average: 4.91
- Strikeouts: 3
- Stats at Baseball Reference

Teams
- Cincinnati Redlegs (1958)

Eugene Franklin "Lefty" Hayden (April 14, 1935 – June 13, 2003) was an American professional baseball player who had a brief career in Major League Baseball as a relief pitcher for the Cincinnati Redlegs in 1958. The native of San Francisco, listed at 6 feet 2 inches (1.88 m) and 175 pounds (79 kg), threw and batted left-handed.

== Biography ==
Hayden, a successful pitcher for Rio Vista High School in California, signed a professional contract in mid-1954 with the Seattle Rainiers of the Pacific Coast League. That season, he played for the Tucson Cowboys in the Arizona–Texas League, then in 1955 played primarily for the Wenatchee Chiefs of the Northwest League. When the Rainiers became an affiliate of the Redlegs in 1956, he joined the Cincinnati organization, playing primarily for the Savannah Redlegs of the South Atlantic League during that season, before spending all of the 1957 season with the Rainiers.

Hayden was called up from the minor leagues in the middle of the 1958 campaign, and pitched in three games for Cincinnati. He was effective in his first two outings, hurling a total of 2 1/3 scoreless innings on June 26 and June 30 against the San Francisco Giants and Milwaukee Braves, respectively. But in his third appearance, against the Philadelphia Phillies on July 6, he gave up four hits, a walk and two earned runs in only one inning pitched. The next day, he was returned to the minor leagues when Cincinnati called up outfielder Danny Morejón. Hayden did not return to the major leagues. He played for the minor league Havana Sugar Kings and Nashville Vols during the 1958 season, his last in professional baseball.

During his baseball career, Hayden pitched in a total of 165 minor league games, compiling a win–loss record of 53–46. While sometimes referred to as "Lefty", a common nickname for left-handed pitchers, Hayden was primarily called "Gene". In 1960, he was hired as a police officer in Rio Vista; he was still with the department in 1969 as a sergeant. As of November 1992, Hayden was working at a substance abuse treatment center in Herald, California, and noted that he was a recovering alcoholic and had spent 1980 homeless in Los Angeles. Hayden died in Lodi, California, at age 68 in 2003.
