= Russ Van Atta =

American baseball player (1906–1986)

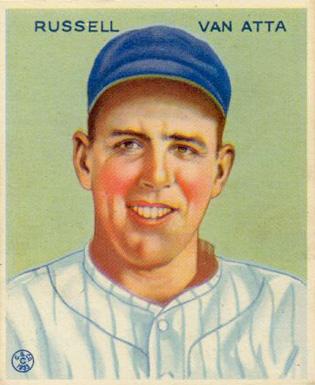
- Pitcher
- Born: June 21, 1906; Augusta, New Jersey, U.S.
- Died: October 10, 1986 (aged 80); Andover, New Jersey, U.S.
- Batted: Left Threw: Left

MLB debut
- April 25, 1933, for the New York Yankees

Last MLB appearance
- May 11, 1939, for the St. Louis Browns

MLB statistics
- Win–loss record: 33–41
- Earned run average: 5.60
- Strikeouts: 339
- Stats at Baseball Reference

Teams
- New York Yankees (1933–1935); St. Louis Browns (1935–1939)

Russell Van Atta (June 21, 1906 – October 10, 1986) was an American professional baseball pitcher who played in Major League Baseball with the New York Yankees and the St. Louis Browns over a seven-season career. After his career ended, he was elected to one-term as sheriff of Sussex County, New Jersey, from 1941 to 1944.

== Biography ==
=== Early life and education ===
He was born on June 21, 1906, near Augusta in Frankford Township, Sussex County, in northwestern New Jersey. Having attended grammar and secondary school locally in Augusta, Van Atta attended the Pennsylvania State University (Penn State) in State College, Pennsylvania. During his years pitching on the team at university, Van Atta only lost a single game in his four collegiate seasons.

=== Baseball career ===
==== Minor leagues (1928–1932) ====
After completing his degree at Penn State, scouts from the Major Leagues considered Van Atta to be a promising prospect and in 1928 the New York Yankees negotiated a contract and paid a signing bonus of $250. However, Miller Huggins, the Manager of the Yankees did not trust Van Atta's talent and sent him to the minors. In 1928, he played for the Hartford Senators, a minor-league team based in Connecticut and affiliated with the Eastern League. He played for the next four seasons with the St. Paul Saints, a Triple-A level minor-league baseball team from Minnesota in the American Association (now defunct).

==== New York Yankees (1933–1935) ====
On September 12, 1932, the New York Yankees acquired Van Atta from the Saints.

At the age of 27, he would make his debut the following season with the Yankees on April 25, 1933, in a game against the Washington Senators. Van Atta's debut was historic—both in his pitching performance shutting out the Senators with a score of 16–0 and for going 4-for-4 in batting performance. To date, he is the only American League (AL) pitcher to get four hits in his major league debut, and one of only seven players in AL history to do so in a nine-inning game. (Note: According to baseball-reference.com, there were 12 major league players to go 4-for-4 in their MLB debuts–7 in the American League, 5 in the National League including Van Atta's feat in 1933. The other eleven include: Art Shires (CHW) in 1928; Cecil Travis (WSH) in 1933; Spook Jacobs (PHA) in 1954; Willie McCovey (SFG) in 1959; Mack Jones (MLN) in 1961; Ted Cox (BOS) in 1977; Hall-of-famer Kirby Puckett (MIN) in 1984; Bill Bean (DET) in 1987; Delino DeShields (MON) in 1990; Derrick Gibson (COL) in 1998, and Wilson Ramos (MIN) in 2010. The overall MLB record for most hits (5) in a debut game is held by Fred Clarke of the National League's Louisville Colonels (1894).)

Van Atta's season performance consisted of a .283 batting average, 4.38 ERA and a record of 12 wins and 4 losses (.750). Although a "late bloomer" at age 27, his rookie year was successful and he led the American League among pitchers in win–loss record, tying for first with Lefty Grove (24–8) of the Philadelphia Athletics.

The successes of Van Atta's rookie year did not carry over into subsequent seasons. His statistics and performance declined for the rest of his career. In 1934, he posted a 6.34 ERA and a 3–5 record. In December 1934, Van Atta injured his pitching hand while breaking a glass window to rescue his pet Cocker Spaniel during a house fire at his home in the Lake Mohawk section of Sparta Township, New Jersey. The injuries included cuts to his left hand that caused nerve damage. For the rest of his career, he would be limited to relief pitching and few spot-starts.

Shortly after spring training, on May 15, 1935, the St. Louis Browns acquired Van Atta from the Yankees.

==== St. Louis Browns (1935–1939) ====
In 1935, Van Atta went 9–16 with a 5.30 ERA, but still Van Atta managed to lead the league with 58 appearances (his 16 losses were the second highest total in the league, behind only Bobo Newsom's 18). He posted an even worse ERA the next season, at 6.60, but again he led the league in appearances with 52. Van Atta played his final game on May 11, 1939.

Overall in his career, Van Atta went 33–41 with a 5.60 ERA. At the plate, he hit .228 with 2 home runs, and on the field he showed off a .929 fielding percentage.

==== Toronto Maple Leafs (1939–1940) ====
On May 14, 1939, he was purchased by Toronto Maple Leafs (now defunct) then a Double-A minor-league team affiliated with the International League from the Browns. (Note: The Maple Leafs and the International League became Triple-A level in 1946. The team eventually became part of the farm system of the Boston Red Sox and in 1973 was moved to Pawtucket, Rhode Island where it operates currently Pawtucket Red Sox.)

=== After baseball ===
Van Atta was elected County Sheriff in Sussex County in northwestern New Jersey in 1941 and served one three-year term until 1944. His fellow Yankee, Babe Ruth campaigned on his behalf. Van Atta later served two three-year terms as on the Sussex County Board of Chosen Freeholders.

Later in life, he partnered a successful oil business, V&H Oil Company of Newton, New Jersey, which was later bought out by Gulf Oil Company.

=== Personal life ===
Russell Van Atta married Helen Elizabeth Depue (1909–1998). They had one son, Russell Van Atta Jr. (1940–2012), and three daughters, Betty Jane, Awilda and Geraldine (1934–2008).

Van Atta died on October 10, 1986, in Andover, New Jersey, at the age of 80. He was buried in the Frankford Plains Cemetery in Augusta.
