= Cliff Bolton =

American baseball player (1907–1979)

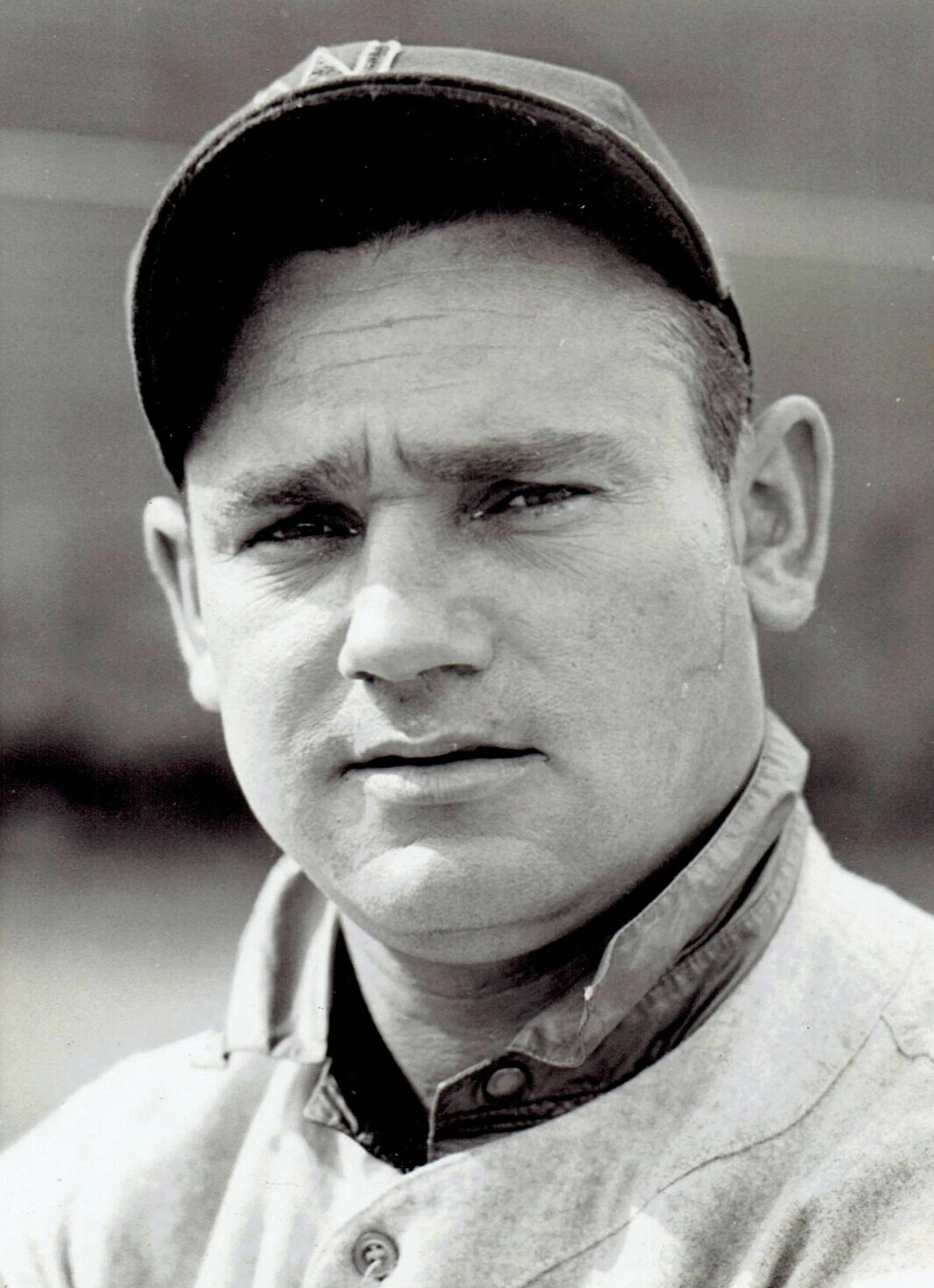
- Bolton, c. 1937
- Catcher
- Born: April 10, 1907; High Point, North Carolina, U.S.
- Died: April 21, 1979 (aged 72); Lexington, North Carolina, U.S.
- Batted: Left Threw: Right

MLB debut
- April 20, 1931, for the Washington Senators

Last MLB appearance
- September 24, 1941, for the Washington Senators

MLB statistics
- Batting average: .291
- Home runs: 6
- Runs batted in: 143
- Stats at Baseball Reference

Teams
- Washington Senators (1931, 1933–1936); Detroit Tigers (1937); Washington Senators (1941)

William Clifton Bolton (April 10, 1907 – April 21, 1979) was an American catcher in Major League Baseball who played for the Washington Senators and Detroit Tigers. The native of High Point, North Carolina, batted left-handed, threw right-handed, and was listed as 5 feet 9 inches (1.75 m) tall and 160 pounds (73 kg).

== Career ==
Bolton started his professional baseball career in 1927 with High Point of the Piedmont League. The following season, he hit .403. He moved up to the class A Eastern League in 1929 and hit .356.

In 1930, he hit .380 for the Chattanooga Lookouts of the Southern Association, and in 1931 he made his major league debut with the Washington Senators. Bolton spent the next few years with Washington. In 1933, he hit .410 coming off the bench; Washington won the American League pennant that season, and Bolton batted twice in the World Series. His only two years as a major league regular were 1935 and 1936.

By 1940, Bolton had returned to the minor leagues. He had another good season in 1941 with the South Atlantic League's Greenville Spinners and returned to the Senators at the end of the season. However, he went 0 for 11 at the plate and never played in the majors again.

In 335 games over seven seasons, Bolton posted a .291 batting average (280-for-962) with 113 runs, 6 home runs, 143 RBI and 110 bases on balls. He finished his career with a .974 fielding percentage.

Bolton had a few more big-hitting seasons in the North Carolina State League towards the end of the 1940s. He retired after the 1952 season.
