= Moose Solters =

American baseball player (1906–1975)

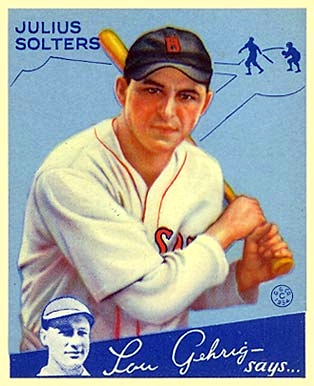
- Left fielder
- Born: March 22, 1906; Pittsburgh, Pennsylvania, U.S.
- Died: September 28, 1975 (aged 69); Pittsburgh, Pennsylvania, U.S.
- Batted: Right Threw: Right

MLB debut
- April 17, 1934, for the Boston Red Sox

Last MLB appearance
- September 26, 1943, for the Chicago White Sox

MLB statistics
- Batting average: .289
- Home runs: 83
- Runs batted in: 599
- Stats at Baseball Reference

Teams
- Boston Red Sox (1934–1935); St. Louis Browns (1935–1936); Cleveland Indians (1937–1939); St. Louis Browns (1939); Chicago White Sox (1940–1941, 1943)

Julius Joseph "Moose" Solters (born Julius Joseph Soltesz; March 22, 1906 – September 28, 1975) was an American professional baseball outfielder who played in Major League Baseball between 1934 and 1943.

== Career ==
Solters played nine seasons in the American League, for four different teams; the Boston Red Sox (125 games), St. Louis Browns (319 games), Cleveland Indians (260 games), and Chicago White Sox (234 games). During his major league career, he appeared in a total of 938 games, batting .289 with 83 home runs and 599 RBIs. He hit for the cycle on August 19, 1934, while with the Red Sox.

On August 2, 1941, while playing for Chicago at Griffith Stadium in Washington, D.C., Solters was struck by an errant baseball during a pregame warmup. The thrown ball fractured his skull and has been attributed to his going blind two years later. Solters died in 1975 in his hometown of Pittsburgh, and is buried in Calvary Cemetery there.

== See also ==
- List of Major League Baseball players to hit for the cycle

Achievements
| Preceded by Lou Gehrig | Hitting for the cycle August 19, 1934 | Succeeded by Joe Medwick |
