= 1935 in baseball =

The following are the baseball events of the year 1935 throughout the world.

== Champions ==
=== Major League Baseball ===
- World Series: Detroit Tigers over Chicago Cubs (4–2)
- All-Star Game, July 8 at Municipal Stadium: American League, 4–1

=== Other champions ===
- Negro League Baseball All-Star Game, August 11 at Comiskey Park: West, 11–8 (11 innings)
- Central American and Caribbean Games: Cuba

== Awards and honors ==
- Most Valuable Player
  - Hank Greenberg, Detroit Tigers (AL)
  - Gabby Hartnett, Chicago Cubs (NL)

== Statistical leaders ==
	American League		National League		Negro National League	
Stat	Player	Total	Player	Total	Player	Total
AVG	Buddy Myer (WSH)	.349	Arky Vaughan (PIT)	.385	Buck Leonard (HOM)	.389
HR	Jimmie Foxx (PHA); Hank Greenberg (DET)	36	Wally Berger (BSN)	34	Josh Gibson (PC)	10
RBI	Hank Greenberg (DET)	168	Wally Berger (BSN)	130	Josh Gibson (PC)	57
W	Wes Ferrell (BOS)	25	Dizzy Dean (STL)	28	Ray Brown (HOM); Leroy Matlock (PC); Webster McDonald (PHS)	8
ERA	Lefty Grove (BOS)	2.70	Cy Blanton (PIT)	2.58	Leroy Matlock (PC)	1.52
K	Tommy Bridges (DET)	163	Dizzy Dean (STL)	190	Luis Tiant (NYC)	64

== Major league baseball final standings ==
=== American League final standings ===
American League
Team	W	L	Pct.	GB	Home	Road
Detroit Tigers	93	58	.616	—	53‍–‍25	40‍–‍33
New York Yankees	89	60	.597	3	41‍–‍33	48‍–‍27
Cleveland Indians	82	71	.536	12	48‍–‍29	34‍–‍42
Boston Red Sox	78	75	.510	16	41‍–‍37	37‍–‍38
Chicago White Sox	74	78	.487	19½	42‍–‍34	32‍–‍44
Washington Senators	67	86	.438	27	37‍–‍39	30‍–‍47
St. Louis Browns	65	87	.428	28½	31‍–‍44	34‍–‍43
Philadelphia Athletics	58	91	.389	34	30‍–‍42	28‍–‍49

Locations of teams for the 1934–1939 American League seasons
American League

=== National League final standings ===
National League
Team	W	L	Pct.	GB	Home	Road
Chicago Cubs	100	54	.649	—	56‍–‍21	44‍–‍33
St. Louis Cardinals	96	58	.623	4	53‍–‍24	43‍–‍34
New York Giants	91	62	.595	8½	50‍–‍27	41‍–‍35
Pittsburgh Pirates	86	67	.562	13½	46‍–‍31	40‍–‍36
Brooklyn Dodgers	70	83	.458	29½	38‍–‍38	32‍–‍45
Cincinnati Reds	68	85	.444	31½	41‍–‍35	27‍–‍50
Philadelphia Phillies	64	89	.418	35½	35‍–‍43	29‍–‍46
Boston Braves	38	115	.248	61½	25‍–‍50	13‍–‍65

Locations of teams for the 1932–1935 National League seasons
National League

== Negro leagues final standings ==
All Negro leagues standings below are per Seamheads.

=== Negro National League final standings ===
vs. Negro National League						vs. Major Black teams			
Negro National League	W	L	T	Pct.	GB	W	L	T	Pct.
^{(1)} Pittsburgh Crawfords	44	20	2	.682	—	53	27	4	.655
Columbus Elite Giants	29	23	2	.556	10½	36	27	2	.569
^{(2)} New York Cubans	32	25	3	.558	9½	36	32	7	.527
Philadelphia Stars	35	32	2	.522	10	39	34	5	.532
Brooklyn Eagles	32	31	0	.508	12½	34	35	1	.493
Homestead Grays	27	33	1	.451	17	31	39	2	.444
Chicago American Giants	24	33	1	.422	16	30	40	3	.432
Newark Dodgers	19	45	1	.300	24½	20	47	1	.301

^{(1)} First half champion ^{(2)} Second half champion Post-season:

- Pittsburgh won the first half of the season, New York won the second half.
- Pittsburgh beat New York 5 games to 2 games in a play-off.
Locations of teams for the 1935 Negro National League season
Negro National League

=== Independent teams final standings ===
A loose confederation of teams existed that were not part of the Negro National League.

vs. All Teams
Independent Clubs	W	L	T	Pct.	GB
Kansas City Monarchs	11	7	2	.600	—
New York Black Yankees	7	5	0	.583	1
Cuban Stars (East)	4	6	0	.400	3
Bismarck Club	3	5	1	.389	3

== Events ==
=== January–May ===
- January 19 – The St. Louis Browns trade Bump Hadley to the Washington Senators for Luke Sewell and cash, then sell Sewell's contract to the Chicago White Sox.
- February 26 – The New York Yankees release Babe Ruth. Later the same day, the Boston Braves sign him.
- April 1 – Dazzy Vance joins the Brooklyn Dodgers.
- April 15 – Johnny Mize, who originally signed with the St. Louis Cardinals, but was sold to the Cincinnati Reds on December 13, 1934, is returned to the Cards.
- April 16 – Opening day, Lefty Gomez holds the New York Yankees to just two hits as the Boston Red Sox win their season opener 1–0 at Yankee Stadium. In the National League, both the Pittsburgh Pirates and Brooklyn Dodgers put up twelve runs in victories over the Cincinnati Reds and Philadelphia Phillies, respectively.
- April 18 – Detroit Tigers leadoff hitter Jo-Jo White draws five walks in the Tigers' 5–4 victory over the Chicago White Sox.
- April 21:
  - The Cleveland Indians open their season with three consecutive extra innings games, amassing 41 total innings.
  - After ten innings, the contest between the Philadelphia Phillies and New York Giants at the Baker Bowl is called a 4–4 tie. The Phillies tie an NL record by turning six double plays, with Phillies shortstop Blondy Ryan tying the individual mark by being part of five of the double plays.
- May 8 – In the first game of a double header with the Philadelphia Phillies, Cincinnati Reds catcher Ernie Lombardi ties a Major League record by hitting four consecutive doubles en route to a 15–4 victory. Lombardi logs just one at-bat in the second game, and gets a single.
- May 24 – At Crosley Field, the Cincinnati Reds and the visiting Philadelphia Phillies played the first night game, which Cincinnati won 2–1. President Franklin D. Roosevelt turns on the lights with a switch in the White House.
- May 25 – Babe Ruth of the Boston Braves goes 4-for-4 with three home runs and six runs batted in. It is the last multi-homer game of Ruth's career, with the final home run, the 714th of his career, being the first ball ever hit to clear the roof at Forbes Field in Pittsburgh.
- May 30 – Babe Ruth ends his playing career with the Boston Braves.

=== June–September ===
- June 26 – The Pittsburgh Pirates sweep a double header with the Boston Braves. Pirates centerfielder Lloyd Waner sets a Major League record with eighteen put outs.
- July 7 – The Detroit Tigers complete a ten-game winning streak that pulls them within one game of the first place Yankees.
- July 8 – At Cleveland Municipal Stadium, home of the Cleveland Indians, the American League defeats the National League, 4–1, in the All-Star Game.
- July 19 – Casey Stengel's Brooklyn Dodgers end the St. Louis Cardinals' fourteen-game winning streak behind a shut out by Johnny Babich.
- July 22 – With a 4–2 victory over the Cincinnati Reds, the Boston Braves end a fifteen-game losing streak.
- July 23 – With first place in the American League on the line, the Detroit Tigers and New York Yankees split a double header. Detroit wins the following day, 4–0, to leave Detroit a half game up on the Yankees. They remain in first for the remainder of the season.
- August 10 – The New York Yankees defeat the Philadelphia A's, 18–7. Right fielder George Selkirk hits two home runs and drives in eight.
- August 16 – Dizzy Dean and Hal Schumacher engage in a pitchers' duel at the Polo Grounds. Schumaker's Giants emerge with the 1–0 victory.
- August 27 – In the first game of a double header at Comiskey Park with the Chicago White Sox, Lou Gehrig goes three-for-five with two RBIs and two runs scored to lead the Yankees to a 13–10 victory. In the second game, Gehrig is walked five times. Chicago wins that game, 4–3.
- August 31 – Vern Kennedy pitches a no-hitter as the Chicago White Sox defeat the Cleveland Indians, 5–0. It is the first no-hitter in the American League since 1931, and the first ever at Chicago's Comiskey Park.
- September 12 – The Philadelphia Athletics sweep a double header from the Chicago White Sox to end a thirteen-game losing streak.
- September 27 – The first place Chicago Cubs sweep a double header with the St. Louis Cardinals that brings their winning streak to 21 games. The Cubs were in third place, 2.5 games back of the Cards, when the streak began.

=== October–December ===
- October 2 – Schoolboy Rowe pitched effectively, however, his fielding error lead to two unearned runs in the first inning as the Chicago Cubs take game one of the 1935 World Series, 3–0.
- October 3 – Hank Greenberg's two-run home run caps off a four-run first inning for the Tigers as Detroit takes game two of the World Series, 8–3. In the bottom of the seventh, Greenberg is hit by a pitch that ends his season.
- October 4 – As part of a double switch, Freddie Lindstrom moves from centerfield to third base in the tenth inning of game three of the World Series. An inning later, he misplays Flea Clifton's ground ball to allow the Detroit Tigers to take the 6–5 victory.
- October 5 – Gabby Hartnett hits a second-inning home run to put the Cubs on the board first, but the Tigers come back with two unanswered runs, and win 2–1.
- October 7 – With the score tied at three, Stan Hack leads off the ninth inning for the Chicago Cubs with a triple. He is left stranded by Bill Jurges, Larry French and Augie Galan fail to drive him in. In the bottom of the inning, Goose Goslin singles in Mickey Cochrane to give the Detroit Tigers their first World Series, four games to two. This was Detroit's first Series victory after failing to win four previous times. Cubs skipper Charlie Grimm is widely second-guessed for letting the pitcher bat in the top of the inning.
- November 26 – The National League assumes control of the bankrupt, Boston Braves franchise after several failed attempts to buy the last-place club. The league takes over only temporarily, until matters can be straightened out.
- December 9 – The New York Giants trade Roy Parmelee, Phil Weintraub and cash to the St. Louis Cardinals for Burgess Whitehead.
- December 10 – The Boston Red Sox acquire Jimmie Foxx and Johnny Marcum from the Philadelphia Athletics for Gordon Rhodes, minor leaguer George Savino and $150,000.
- December 12 – The Boston Braves trade Ed Brandt and Randy Moore to the Brooklyn Dodgers for Ray Benge, Tony Cuccinello, Al López and Bobby Reis. They also sell the contracts of Flint Rhem and Johnny Vander Meer to the Cincinnati Reds.
- December 17 – The Boston Red Sox acquire Heinie Manush from the Washington Senators for Roy Johnson and Carl Reynolds.

== Movies ==
- Alibi Ike

== Births ==
=== January ===
- January 5 – Earl Battey
- January 6 – Ed Bauta
- January 7 – Dick Schofield
- January 8 – Reno Bertoia
- January 9 – Bob Duliba
- January 10 – Ted Bowsfield
- January 17 – Dick Brown
- January 19 – Fred Valentine
- January 26 – Bob Uecker
- January 27 – Steve Demeter

=== February ===
- February 3:
  - Don Kaiser
  - Dick Tracewski
- February 10 – Sherman Jones
- February 11 – George Alusik
- February 17 – Whammy Douglas
- February 19 – Russ Nixon
- February 28 – Bill Haller

=== March ===
- March 13 – Joan LeQuia
- March 19 – Fritz Brickell
- March 22:
  - Gene Oliver
  - Frank Pulli
- March 28:
  - Jeanie Descombes
  - Garland Shifflett

=== April ===
- April 1 – Tom Qualters
- April 8 – Dick Luebke
- April 10 – Joe Gibbon
- April 13 – Bill Deegan
- April 14:
  - Gene Hayden
  - Katie Horstman
- April 19:
  - Don Gile
  - Héctor Maestri
  - John Wyatt
- April 21:
  - Mack Burk
  - Dolores Lee
- April 23 – Ron Blackburn
- April 26 – Nate Smith
- April 28:
  - Bob Botz
  - Pedro Ramos

=== May ===
- May 5 – José Pagán
- May 9 – Joe Shipley
- May 12 – Felipe Alou
- May 13 – Bill Dailey
- May 18 – Ken Hamlin
- May 20 – Gloria McCloskey
- May 22 – Ron Piché
- May 26 – Eddie Haas
- May 27 – Jerry Kindall
- May 30 – Ed Rakow

=== June ===
- June 1:
  - Hal Kolstad
  - Jack Kralick
- June 8 – George Brunet
- June 12 – Bob Thorpe
- June 14 – Neil Wilson
- June 19 – Chet Boak
- June 24 – Charlie Dees
- June 25 – Don Demeter
- June 28 – Bob Blaylock
- June 29 – Katsuya Nomura, Japanese baseball player and manager
- June 30 – Paul Toth

=== July ===
- July 3 – Mutsuo Minagawa
- July 12 – Dave Ricketts
- July 14 – Earl Francis
- July 15:
  - Donn Clendenon
  - Bob Miller
- July 19 – Nick Koback
- July 21 – Moe Drabowsky
- July 25 – Larry Sherry
- July 26:
  - Buddy Gilbert
  - Lou Jackson
- July 27:
  - John Edelman
  - Sarah Jane Sands
- July 28 – Ernie Bowman
- July 31 – Terry Fox

=== August ===
- August 1 – Phyllis Bookout
- August 12 – Ken McBride
- August 13 – Mudcat Grant
- August 15 – Joey Jay
- August 18 – Bob Humphreys
- August 19 – Bobby Richardson
- August 26 – Al Silvera
- August 27 – Ernie Broglio
- August 30 – Frank Funk
- August 31 – Frank Robinson

=== September ===
- September 2:
  - Gordon Massa
  - Don Williams
- September 5 – Tom Patton
- September 7 – Enrique Maroto
- September 9 – Jim Proctor
- September 17 – Tadashi Sugiura
- September 18 – Jerry Mallett
- September 26 – Walt Streuli
- September 27 – Dave Wickersham
- September 28 – Bob Dustal
- September 29:
  - Bob Anderson
  - Howie Bedell

=== October ===
- October 12:
  - Tony Kubek
  - Bobo Osborne
- October 16 – Manny Montejo
- October 18 – Howie Nunn
- October 28 – Bob Veale
- October 30 – Jim Perry

=== November ===
- November 7 – Jay Hankins
- November 9:
  - Bob Gibson
  - Joan Kaufman
- November 15 – Jack Smith
- November 21 – Dick Bertell
- November 25 – Jim Duffalo

=== December ===
- December 2 – Harry Taylor
- December 7 – Don Cardwell
- December 13:
  - Joe Christopher
  - Lindy McDaniel
- December 17 – Cal Ripken Sr.
- December 19 – Tony Taylor
- December 25:
  - Joyce Steele
  - Joanne Weaver
- December 26 – Al Jackson
- December 29 – Annie Gosbee
- December 30 – Sandy Koufax

== Deaths ==
=== January ===
- January 14 – Irv Young, 57, pitcher for the Beaneaters, Doves, WhiteSox and Pirates in six seasons from 1905 to 1911, a 20-game winner in his rookie season, who twice led the National League in starts, complete games and innings pitched.
- January 29 – Ed Murphy, 58, pitcher for the 1898 Philadelphia Phillies and for the St. Louis Cardinals from 1901 to 1903.

=== February ===
- February 18 – Gene DeMontreville, 61, a .303 career hitter with the Senators, Beaneaters, Orioles, Orphans and Superbas from 1894 to 1904, who was able to play all positions except pitcher and catcher.
- February 22 – Marsh Williams, 42, pitcher for the 1916 Philadelphia Athletics.
- February 24 – Joe Moffet, 75, backup infielder/outfielder for the 1884 Toledo Blue Stockings of the American Association.
- February 28 – Harry Schafer, 78, third baseman and outfielder who played from 1881 through 1888 for the Boston Red Stockings.

=== March ===
- March 11 – George Rooks, 71, backup outfielder for the Boston Beaneaters during the 1891 season.
- March 15 – Ed Fuller, 65, pitcher for the 1886 Washington Nationals.
- March 16 – Oscar Streit, 61, pitcher for the Boston Beaneaters in 1899 and the Cleveland Bronchos in 1902.
- March 20 – Bill Holbert, 80, catcher for the Louisville Grays, Milwaukee Grays, Syracuse Stars, Troy Trojans, New York Metropolitans and Brooklyn Bridegrooms in 12 seasons spanning 1876–1888, who holds the major league record for career at-bats without a home run, failing to do so in 2,335 batting appearances.
- March 23 – John Flynn, 51, first baseman who played from 1910 through 1912 with the Pittsburgh Pirates and Washington Senators, also a minor league manager.
- March 31 – Steve Libby, 81, first baseman who played for the Buffalo Bisons of the National League for one game during the 1879 season, and eventually served as an umpire in the league.

=== April ===
- April 2 – Brad Hogg, 46, pitcher for the Boston Rustlers/Braves, Chicago Cubs and Philadelphia Phillies in five seasons spanning 1911–1919.
- April 10 – Pat Hartnett, 71, first baseman for the 1890 St. Louis Browns of the National League.
- April 11 – Charlie Gettig, 64, pitcher who played from 1896 through 1889 for the New York Giants.
- April 14 – Doc Martin, 47, pitcher for the Philadelphia Athletics in a span of three years from 1908 to 1912.
- April 19 – Jim Donahue, 73, catcher for New York Metropolitans, Kansas City Cowboys and Columbus Solons during five seasons spanning 1886–1891.
- April 22:
  - Charlie Blackwell, 40, outfielder in the Negro leagues from 1915 to 1929.
  - George Ross, 42, pitcher for the 1918 New York Giants.
- April 23 – Swede Carlstrom, 47, shortstop for the Boston Red Sox in 1911.
- April 26 – John Thornton, 65, pitcher the Washington Nationals in 1889 and the Philadelphia Phillies from 1891 to 1892, and later an outfielder for the 1892 St. Louis Browns.
- April 28 – Dewey McDougal, 63, pitcher who played from 1895 to 1896 for the St. Louis Browns.

=== May ===
- May 3 – Ted Breitenstein, 65, pitcher for the Browns, Reds and Cardinals from 1891 to 1901, whose 160 victories were the most by a 19th-century left-hander, who also hurled two no-hitters, twice led the National League in complete games, and collected three 20-win seasons.
- May 4 – Dory Dean, 82, pitcher for the 1876 Cincinnati Reds.
- May 7 – Sid Farrar, 75, infielder for the Philadelphia Quakers/Athletics from 1883 to 1890.
- May 16:
  - Wallace Fessenden, 74, 19th century umpire and manager; umpired in 53 National League games from April 24, 1889 to July 2, 1890, then managed Syracuse of the then-major-league American Association from July 21 to August 3, 1890.
  - Pete Weckbecker, 70, catcher who played from 1889 to 1890 for the Indianapolis Hoosiers and Louisville Colonels.
- May 16 – Mark McGrillis, 62, third baseman who played for the 1892 St. Louis Browns of the National League.
- May 22 – Luke Glavenich, 42, pitcher for the 1913 Cleveland Naps.
- May 28 – Charlie Sullivan, 32, pitcher for the Detroit Tigers in part of three seasons spanning 1928–1931.
- May 31 – Casey Patten, 61, pitcher who posted a 105–128 and a 3.36 ERA with the Washington Senators and Boston Red Sox over parts of eight seasons from 1901 to 1908.

=== June ===
- June 8 – Jay Parker, 60, pitcher for the 1899 Pittsburgh Pirates.
- June 17 – Wiman Andrus, 76, who pitched in one game for the 1885 Providence Grays.
- June 11 – Fred Abbott, 60, catcher who played from 1903 through 1905 with the Cleveland Naps and Philadelphia Phillies.
- June 14 – Walt Kuhn, 48, catcher for the Chicago White Sox from 1912 to 1914.
- June 25 – Jack O'Neill, 64, Irish-born catcher who played from 1902 to 1906 for the St. Louis Cardinals, Chicago Cubs and Boston Beaneaters; one of four brothers to play in the majors, including Steve O'Neill.

=== July ===
- July 2 – Hank O'Day, 75, Hall of Fame umpire who officiated in the National League for 30 years between 1895 and 1927 and worked in ten World Series, previously a pitcher in the Players' League and a manager for the Reds and Cubs.
- July 10 – Paul Hines, 83, outfielder/infielder and one of the top stars in the early days of baseball, who is given credit for 13 firsts in Major League history, including the first unassisted triple play and the first Triple Crown, also a .302 hitter in 20 seasons from 1872 to 1891, while amassing more hits than any other player in the National League over its first five seasons.
- July 18 – Tom Ryder, 72, backup outfielder for the St. Louis Maroons of the Union Association during the 1884 season.
- July 24 – Billy Crowell, 49, pitcher who played from 1887 to 1888 for the Cleveland Blues and Louisville Colonels.
- July 26 – Bill Whitrock, 65, pitcher for the St. Louis Browns, Louisville Colonels, Cincinnati Reds and Philadelphia Phillies in part of four seasons spanning 1890–1896.

=== August ===
- August 11 – Jack Zalusky, 56, catcher for the 1903 New York Highlanders of the American League.
- August 24 – George Keefe, 68, pitcher who played for the NL Washington Nationals, PL Buffalo Bisons and AA Washington Statesmen from 1886 to 1891.
- August 30 – Leo Smith, 76, shortstop for the 1890 Rochester Broncos of the American Association.

=== September ===
- September 3 – Mike Ryan, 67, third baseman for the 1895 St. Louis Browns of the National League.
- September 4 – Dan Cotter, 68, pitcher who played with the Buffalo Bisons of the Players' League in 1890.
- September 10 – Pug Bennett, 61, second baseman who played from 1906 to 1907 for the St. Louis Cardinals.
- September 12 – Ed Beecher, 75, outfielder who played with the Pittsburgh Alleghenys, Washington Nationals, Buffalo Bisons, Washington Statesmen and Philadelphia Athletics in part of four seasons spanning 1897–1891.
- September 15 – Joe Ardner, 77, second baseman who played for the Cleveland Blues in 1884 and the Cleveland Spiders in 1890.
- September 17 – Len Koenecke, 31, outfielder who played for the New York Giants in 1932 and the Brooklyn Dodgers from 1934 to 1935; flying back to Brooklyn after being released by the Dodgers — and under the influence of alcohol — he was killed in self-defense by an airplane pilot whom he attacked in mid-air.
- September 21:
  - Herm McFarland, 65, outfielder who played for the Louisville Colonels, Cincinnati Reds, Chicago White Sox, Baltimore Orioles and New York Highlanders in all or part of five seasons from 1896 to 1903.
  - Henry Yaik, 71, catcher and outfielder who played with the Pittsburgh Alleghenys in the 1888 season.

=== October ===
- October 11:
  - George Pierce, 47, pitcher who played from 1912 through 1917 for the Chicago Cubs and St. Louis Cardinals.
  - Chick Smith, 42, pitcher for the 1913 Cincinnati Reds.
- October 12 – Ray Treadaway, 27, third baseman who played with the Washington Senators during the 1930 season.
- October 19 – Walt Doan, 48, pitcher for the Cleveland Naps in 1909 and 1910.
- October 22 – Tommy Tucker, 71, first baseman for the Baltimore Orioles, Boston Beaneaters, Washington Senators, Brooklyn Bridebrooms, St. Louis Browns, and Cleveland Spiders between 1887 and 1899, who led the American Association hitters in 1889 with a .372 average.
- October 30 – Steve Brodie, 67, outfielder and a .303 career hitter for the Beaneaters, Browns, Orioles, Pirates and Giants during 11 seasons spanning 1890–1902.

=== November ===
- November 6 – Billy Sunday, 72, popular outfielder in the National League during the 1880s, who became the most celebrated and influential American evangelist during the first two decades of the 20th century.
- November 9 – Rex DeVogt, 47, backup catcher for the Boston Braves during the 1913 season.
- November 13 – Frank Navin, 64, owner of the Detroit Tigers since 1908 who assembled the American League pennant-winning clubs of 1907, 1908, 1909 and 1934, as well as the 1935 World Series champion team.
- November 17 – Carl Cashion, 44, pitcher for the Washington Senators from 1911 to 1914.

=== December ===
- December 8 – Baldy Louden, 52, second baseman/shortstop for the New York Highlanders (1907), Detroit Tigers (1912–1913) and Cincinnati Reds (1920), who enjoyed his greatest success while playing with the Buffalo Buffeds/Blues of the Federal League, when he ranked among the top-ten in several offensive categories in the 1914 and 1915 seasons.
- December 17 – Charlie Atherton, 62, third baseman for the 1899 Washington Senators of the National League.
- December 21 – Cy Rigler, 53, National League umpire since 1906, who worked in ten World Series, the first All-Star game, and is regarded by creating arm signals for balls and strikes count.
- December 28 – Jack Corcoran, 77, catcher for the 1884 Brooklyn Atlantics.
- December 29 – Harley Payne, 67, pitcher who played from 1896 through 1899 for the Brooklyn Bridegrooms and the Pittsburgh Pirates.
