= 1935 Major League Baseball season =

1935 MLB season
- League: American League (AL); National League (NL)
- Sport: Baseball
- Duration: Regular season: April 16 – September 29, 1935; World Series: October 2–7, 1935
- Games: 154
- Teams: 16 (8 per league)

Regular season
- Season MVP: AL: Hank Greenberg (DET); NL: Gabby Hartnett (CHC)
- AL champions: Detroit Tigers
- AL runners-up: New York Yankees
- NL champions: Chicago Cubs
- NL runners-up: St. Louis Cardinals

World Series
- Champions: Detroit Tigers
- Runners-up: Chicago Cubs

MLB seasons
- ← 1934 1936 →

Locations of teams for the 1934–1939 American League seasons
American League
Locations of teams for the 1932–1935 National League seasons
National League

The 1935 major league baseball season began on April 16, 1935. The regular season ended on September 29, with the Chicago Cubs and Detroit Tigers as the regular season champions of the National League and American League, respectively. The postseason began with Game 1 of the 32nd World Series on October 2 and ended with Game 6 on October 7. The Tigers defeated the Cubs, four games to two, capturing their first championship in franchise history. This was the third World Series between the two teams, and the first to see the Tigers win over the Cubs. Going into the season, the defending World Series champions were the St. Louis Cardinals from the 1934 season.

The third All-Star Game was held on July 8 at the Cleveland Stadium in Cleveland, Ohio, home of the Cleveland Indians. The American League won, 4–1.

== Schedule ==
The 1935 schedule consisted of 154 games for all teams in the American League and National League, each of which had eight teams. Each team was scheduled to play 22 games against the other seven teams of their respective league. This continued the format put in place since the 1904 season (except for 1919) and would be used until 1961 in the American League and 1962 in the National League.

Opening Day took place on April 16 and saw twelve teams across both leagues play. The final day of the regular season was on September 29 and featured all sixteen teams, continuing the trend which began with the 1930 season. The World Series took place between October 2 and October 7.

== Rule changes ==
The 1935 season saw the following rule changes:

- The National League now allowed night games to take place, allowing teams to schedule up to seven night games. Any club scheduling more would be fined $15,000 (equivalent to $352,000 in 2025) and have its gate receipts confiscated.
- The National League adjusted their rules on waivers:
  - Waiver price increased from $4,000 to $6,000 (equivalent to $94,000 to $141,000 in 2025).
  - Time limit on waivers reduced from five days to three.

== Teams ==
League	Team	City	Ballpark	Capacity	Manager
American League	Boston Red Sox	Boston, Massachusetts	Fenway Park	33,817	Joe Cronin
American League	Chicago White Sox	Chicago, Illinois	Comiskey Park	52,000	Jimmy Dykes
American League	Cleveland Indians	Cleveland, Ohio	League Park	21,414	Walter Johnson
American League	Cleveland Indians	Cleveland, Ohio	League Park	21,414	Steve O'Neill
American League	Detroit Tigers	Detroit, Michigan	Navin Field	30,000	Mickey Cochrane
American League	New York Yankees	New York, New York	Yankee Stadium	62,000	Joe McCarthy
American League	Philadelphia Athletics	Philadelphia, Pennsylvania	Shibe Park	33,000	Connie Mack
American League	St. Louis Browns	St. Louis, Missouri	Sportsman's Park	34,023	Rogers Hornsby
American League	Washington Senators	Washington, D.C.	Griffith Stadium	32,000	Bucky Harris
National League	Boston Braves	Boston, Massachusetts	Braves Field	46,500	Bill McKechnie
National League	Brooklyn Dodgers	New York, New York	Ebbets Field	32,000	Casey Stengel
National League	Chicago Cubs	Chicago, Illinois	Wrigley Field	40,000	Charlie Grimm
National League	Cincinnati Reds	Cincinnati, Ohio	Crosley Field	26,060	Chuck Dressen
National League	New York Giants	New York, New York	Polo Grounds	56,000	Bill Terry
National League	Philadelphia Phillies	Philadelphia, Pennsylvania	Baker Bowl	18,800	Jimmie Wilson
National League	Pittsburgh Pirates	Pittsburgh, Pennsylvania	Forbes Field	41,000	Pie Traynor
National League	St. Louis Cardinals	St. Louis, Missouri	Sportsman's Park	34,023	Frankie Frisch

== Standings ==
=== American League ===
American League
Team	W	L	Pct.	GB	Home	Road
Detroit Tigers	93	58	.616	—	53‍–‍25	40‍–‍33
New York Yankees	89	60	.597	3	41‍–‍33	48‍–‍27
Cleveland Indians	82	71	.536	12	48‍–‍29	34‍–‍42
Boston Red Sox	78	75	.510	16	41‍–‍37	37‍–‍38
Chicago White Sox	74	78	.487	19½	42‍–‍34	32‍–‍44
Washington Senators	67	86	.438	27	37‍–‍39	30‍–‍47
St. Louis Browns	65	87	.428	28½	31‍–‍44	34‍–‍43
Philadelphia Athletics	58	91	.389	34	30‍–‍42	28‍–‍49

=== National League ===
National League
Team	W	L	Pct.	GB	Home	Road
Chicago Cubs	100	54	.649	—	56‍–‍21	44‍–‍33
St. Louis Cardinals	96	58	.623	4	53‍–‍24	43‍–‍34
New York Giants	91	62	.595	8½	50‍–‍27	41‍–‍35
Pittsburgh Pirates	86	67	.562	13½	46‍–‍31	40‍–‍36
Brooklyn Dodgers	70	83	.458	29½	38‍–‍38	32‍–‍45
Cincinnati Reds	68	85	.444	31½	41‍–‍35	27‍–‍50
Philadelphia Phillies	64	89	.418	35½	35‍–‍43	29‍–‍46
Boston Braves	38	115	.248	61½	25‍–‍50	13‍–‍65

=== Tie games ===
9 tie games (5 in AL, 4 in NL), which are not factored into winning percentage or games behind (and were often replayed again) occurred throughout the season.

==== American League ====
- Boston Red Sox, 1
- Chicago White Sox, 1
- Cleveland Indians, 3
- Detroit Tigers, 1
- St. Louis Browns, 3
- Washington Senators, 1

==== National League ====
- Brooklyn Dodgers, 1
- Cincinnati Reds, 1
- New York Giants, 3
- Philadelphia Phillies, 3

== Postseason ==
The postseason began on October 2 and ended on October 7 with the Detroit Tigers defeating the Chicago Cubs in the 1935 World Series in six games.

=== Bracket ===
World Series
AL	Detroit Tigers	4
NL	Chicago Cubs	2

== Managerial changes ==
=== Off-season ===
Team	Former Manager	New Manager
Boston Red Sox	Bucky Harris	Joe Cronin
Washington Senators	Joe Cronin	Bucky Harris

=== In-season ===
Team	Former Manager	New Manager
Cleveland Indians	Walter Johnson	Steve O'Neill

== League leaders ==
Any team shown in small text indicates a previous team a player was on during the season.

=== American League ===
Hitting leaders
Stat	Player	Total
AVG	Buddy Myer (WSH)	.349
OPS	Jimmie Foxx (PHA)	1.096
HR	Jimmie Foxx (PHA); Hank Greenberg (DET)	36
RBI	Hank Greenberg (DET)	168
R	Lou Gehrig (NYY)	125
H	Joe Vosmik (CLE)	216
SB	Billy Werber (BOS)	29

Pitching leaders
Stat	Player	Total
W	Wes Ferrell (BOS)	25
L	Bobo Newsom (WSH/SLB)	18
ERA	Lefty Grove (BOS)	2.70
K	Tommy Bridges (DET)	163
IP	Wes Ferrell (BOS)	322.1
SV	Jack Knott (SLB)	7
WHIP	Lefty Grove (BOS)	1.223

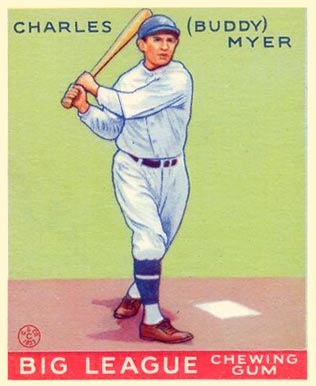
All Star Buddy Myer

=== National League ===
Hitting leaders
Stat	Player	Total
AVG	Arky Vaughan (PIT)	.385
OPS	Arky Vaughan (PIT)	1.098
HR	Wally Berger (BSN)	34
RBI	Wally Berger (BSN)	130
R	Augie Galan (CHC)	133
H	Billy Herman (CHC)	227
SB	Augie Galan (CHC)	22

Pitching leaders
Stat	Player	Total
W	Dizzy Dean (STL)	28
L	Ben Cantwell (BSN)	25
ERA	Cy Blanton (PIT)	2.58
K	Dizzy Dean (STL)	190
IP	Dizzy Dean (STL)	325.1
SV	Dutch Leonard (BRO)	8
WHIP	Cy Blanton (PIT)	1.081

== Milestones ==
=== Batters ===
==== Cycles ====
- Joe Medwick (STL):
  - Medwick hit for his first cycle and eighth in franchise history, on June 29 against the Cincinnati Reds.

==== Other batting accomplishments ====
- Babe Ruth (BSN):
  - Set a Major League record for most career home runs, hitting his 714th home run on May 25 against the Pittsburgh Pirates.

=== Pitchers ===
==== No-hitters ====
- Vern Kennedy (CWS):
  - Kennedy threw his first career no-hitter and ninth no-hitter in franchise history, by defeating the Cleveland Indians 5–0 on August 31. Kennedy walked four and struck out five.

=== Miscellaneous ===
- Boston Braves:
  - Set the modern National League record for most losses in a season on September 29 with 115. The previous record of 109 was set by the Philadelphia Phillies in 1928.
  - Set the modern National League record for worst winning percentage with .248. The previous record of .283 was set by the Philadelphia Phillies in 1928.

== Awards and honors ==
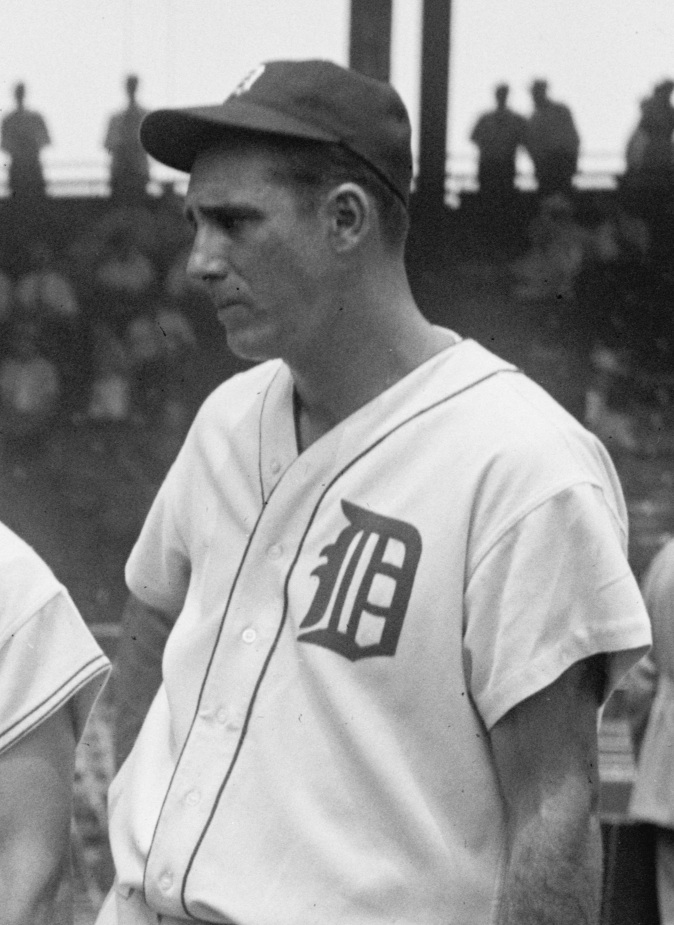
Hank Greenberg, Hall of Famer and two-time MVP

=== Regular season ===
Baseball Writers' Association of America Awards
BBWAA Award	National League	American League
Most Valuable Player	Gabby Hartnett (CHC)	Hank Greenberg (DET)

The Sporting News Awards
Award	National League	American League
Most Valuable Player	Arky Vaughan (PIT)	Hank Greenberg (DET)

== Home field attendance ==
Team name	Wins	%±	Home attendance	%±	Per game
Detroit Tigers	93	−7.9%	1,034,929	12.6%	13,100
New York Giants	91	−2.2%	748,748	2.4%	9,478
Chicago Cubs	100	16.3%	692,604	−2.1%	8,995
New York Yankees	89	−5.3%	657,508	−23.1%	8,885
Boston Red Sox	78	2.6%	558,568	−8.5%	7,070
St. Louis Cardinals	96	1.1%	506,084	55.7%	6,573
Brooklyn Dodgers	70	−1.4%	470,517	8.4%	6,111
Chicago White Sox	74	39.6%	470,281	98.8%	6,108
Cincinnati Reds	68	30.8%	448,247	116.8%	5,898
Cleveland Indians	82	−3.5%	397,615	1.6%	5,164
Pittsburgh Pirates	86	16.2%	352,885	9.4%	4,583
Washington Senators	67	1.5%	255,011	−22.7%	3,312
Philadelphia Athletics	58	−14.7%	233,173	−23.8%	3,239
Boston Braves	38	−51.3%	232,754	−23.2%	3,103
Philadelphia Phillies	64	14.3%	205,470	20.9%	2,601
St. Louis Browns	65	−3.0%	80,922	−29.8%	1,065

== Venues ==
Cleveland Indians played their last full season at League Park, though would host the All-Star Game at Cleveland Stadium (where they previously played in part in 1932 and in full in 1933). Following this season, the team would play 11 consecutive seasons playing at both League Park and Cleveland Stadium.

== See also ==
- 1935 in baseball (Events, Movies, Births, Deaths)
