= 1936 St. Louis Browns season =

Major League Baseball season

1936 St. Louis Browns
- League: American League
- Ballpark: Sportsman's Park
- City: St. Louis, Missouri
- Record: 57–95 (.375)
- League place: 7th
- Owners: Estate of Phil Ball
- Managers: Rogers Hornsby
- Radio: KMOX (France Laux, Ray Schmidt); KWK (Johnny O'Hara)

The 1936 St. Louis Browns season involved the Browns finishing 7th in the American League with a record of 57 wins and 95 losses.

== Regular season ==
=== Season standings ===
American League
Team	W	L	Pct.	GB	Home	Road
New York Yankees	102	51	.667	—	56‍–‍21	46‍–‍30
Detroit Tigers	83	71	.539	19½	44‍–‍33	39‍–‍38
Washington Senators	82	71	.536	20	42‍–‍35	40‍–‍36
Chicago White Sox	81	70	.536	20	43‍–‍32	38‍–‍38
Cleveland Indians	80	74	.519	22½	49‍–‍30	31‍–‍44
Boston Red Sox	74	80	.481	28½	47‍–‍29	27‍–‍51
St. Louis Browns	57	95	.375	44½	31‍–‍43	26‍–‍52
Philadelphia Athletics	53	100	.346	49	31‍–‍46	22‍–‍54

=== Record vs. opponents ===
1936 American League record Sources:
Team	BOS	CWS	CLE	DET	NYY	PHA	SLB	WSH
Boston	—	12–10	9–13	13–9	15–7–1	13–9	12–10	8–14
Chicago	10–12	—	12–10–1	8–14	7–14	15–7	13–8–1	16–5
Cleveland	13–9	10–12–1	—	9–13	6–16–1	13–9	15–7–1	14–8
Detroit	9–13	14–8	13–9	—	8–14	17–5	11–11	11–11
New York	15–7–1	14–7	16–6–1	14–8	—	16–6	14–8	13–9
Philadelphia	9–13	7–15	9–13	5–17	6–16	—	11–10–1	6–16
St. Louis	10–12	8–13–1	7–15–1	11–11	8–14	10–11–1	—	3–19
Washington	14–8	5–16	8–14	11–11	9–13	16–16	19–3	—

=== Roster ===
1936 St. Louis Browns
Roster
Pitchers: 18 Ivy Andrews; 19 Sugar Cain; 20 Earl Caldwell; 16 Elon Hogsett; 23 Sig Jakucki; 14 Harry Kimberlin; 17 Jack Knott; 22 Glenn Liebhardt; 23 Roy Mahaffey; 24 Mike Meola; 25 Tommy Thomas; 19 Les Tietje; 21 Russ Van Atta; 22 Jim Walkup	Catchers: 12 Tony Giuliani; 11 Rollie Hemsley; Infielders: 15 Ollie Bejma; 2 Jim Bottomley; 2 Jack Burns; 3 Tom Carey; 7 Harlond Clift; 4 Rogers Hornsby; 1 Lyn Lary	Outfielders: 10 Beau Bell; 9 Ed Coleman; 8 Ray Pepper; 5 Moose Solters; 6 Sam West	Manager: 4 Rogers Hornsby; Coaches: 27 Grover Hartley; 26 Charley O'Leary

== Player stats ==
= Indicates team leader

=== Batting ===
==== Starters by position ====
Note: Pos = Position; G = Games played; AB = At bats; H = Hits; Avg. = Batting average; HR = Home runs; RBI = Runs batted in

Pos	Player	G	AB	H	Avg.	HR	RBI
C	Rollie Hemsley	116	377	99	.263	2	39
1B	Jim Bottomley	140	544	162	.298	12	95
2B	Tom Carey	134	488	133	.273	1	57
SS	Lyn Lary	155	619	179	.289	2	52
3B	Harlond Clift	152	576	174	.302	20	73
OF	Beau Bell	155	616	212	.344	11	123
OF	Moose Solters	152	628	183	.291	17	134
OF	Sam West	152	533	148	.278	7	70

==== Other batters ====
Note: G = Games played; AB = At bats; H = Hits; Avg. = Batting average; HR = Home runs; RBI = Runs batted in

Player	G	AB	H	Avg.	HR	RBI
Tony Giuliani	71	198	43	.217	0	13
Ollie Bejma	67	139	36	.259	2	18
Ed Coleman	92	137	40	.292	2	34
Ray Pepper	75	124	35	.282	2	23
Jack Burns	9	14	3	.214	0	1
Rogers Hornsby	2	5	2	.400	0	2

=== Pitching ===
==== Starting pitchers ====
Note: G = Games pitched; IP = Innings pitched; W = Wins; L = Losses; ERA = Earned run average; SO = Strikeouts

Player	G	IP	W	L	ERA	SO
Elon Hogsett	39	215.1	13	15	5.52	67
Ivy Andrews	36	191.1	7	12	4.84	33
Sugar Cain	4	16.1	1	1	6.61	8

==== Other pitchers ====
Note: G = Games pitched; IP = Innings pitched; W = Wins; L = Losses; ERA = Earned run average; SO = Strikeouts

Player	G	IP	W	L	ERA	SO
Jack Knott	47	192.2	9	17	7.29	60
Earl Caldwell	41	189.0	7	16	6.00	59
Tommy Thomas	36	179.2	11	9	5.26	40
Russ Van Atta	52	122.2	4	7	6.60	59
Roy Mahaffey	21	60.0	2	6	8.10	13
Les Tietje	14	50.1	3	5	6.62	16
Sig Jakucki	7	20.2	0	3	8.71	9
Jim Walkup	5	15.2	0	3	8.04	5

==== Relief pitchers ====
Note: G = Games pitched; W = Wins; L = Losses; SV = Saves; ERA = Earned run average; SO = Strikeouts

Player	G	W	L	SV	ERA	SO
Glenn Liebhardt	24	0	0	0	8.78	20
Harry Kimberlin	13	0	0	0	5.40	4
Mike Meola	9	0	1	0	9.31	6

== Farm system ==
Level	Team	League	Manager
AA	Toledo Mud Hens	American Association	Fred Haney
A1	San Antonio Missions	Texas League	Bob Coleman
C	Palestine Pals	East Texas League	Bobby Goff
D	Lafayette White Sox	Evangeline League	Leonard Mock and Don Motlow
