= 1936 Washington Senators season =

1936 Washington Senators
- League: American League
- Ballpark: Griffith Stadium
- City: Washington, D.C.
- Record: 82–71 (.536)
- League place: 3rd
- Owners: Clark Griffith and William Richardson
- Managers: Bucky Harris
- Radio: WJSV (Arch McDonald)

The 1936 Washington Senators won 82 games, lost 71, and finished in third place in the American League. They were managed by Bucky Harris and played home games at Griffith Stadium.

== Regular season ==
=== Season standings ===
American League
Team	W	L	Pct.	GB	Home	Road
New York Yankees	102	51	.667	—	56‍–‍21	46‍–‍30
Detroit Tigers	83	71	.539	19½	44‍–‍33	39‍–‍38
Washington Senators	82	71	.536	20	42‍–‍35	40‍–‍36
Chicago White Sox	81	70	.536	20	43‍–‍32	38‍–‍38
Cleveland Indians	80	74	.519	22½	49‍–‍30	31‍–‍44
Boston Red Sox	74	80	.481	28½	47‍–‍29	27‍–‍51
St. Louis Browns	57	95	.375	44½	31‍–‍43	26‍–‍52
Philadelphia Athletics	53	100	.346	49	31‍–‍46	22‍–‍54

=== Record vs. opponents ===
1936 American League record Sources:
Team	BOS	CWS	CLE	DET	NYY	PHA	SLB	WSH
Boston	—	12–10	9–13	13–9	15–7–1	13–9	12–10	8–14
Chicago	10–12	—	12–10–1	8–14	7–14	15–7	13–8–1	16–5
Cleveland	13–9	10–12–1	—	9–13	6–16–1	13–9	15–7–1	14–8
Detroit	9–13	14–8	13–9	—	8–14	17–5	11–11	11–11
New York	15–7–1	14–7	16–6–1	14–8	—	16–6	14–8	13–9
Philadelphia	9–13	7–15	9–13	5–17	6–16	—	11–10–1	6–16
St. Louis	10–12	8–13–1	7–15–1	11–11	8–14	10–11–1	—	3–19
Washington	14–8	5–16	8–14	11–11	9–13	16–16	19–3	—

=== Roster ===
1936 Washington Senators
Roster
Pitchers: 18 Pete Appleton; 21 Joe Bokina; 16 Joe Cascarella; 20 Ken Chase; 14 Syd Cohen; 19 Henry Coppola; 15 Jimmie DeShong; -- Bill Dietrich; 14 Ed Linke; 20 Firpo Marberry; 12 Bobo Newsom; 20 Bill Phebus; 16 Jack Russell; 17 Monte Weaver; 11 Earl Whitehill	Catchers: 8 Cliff Bolton; 31,66 Shanty Hogan; 10 Wally Millies; 22 Alex Sabo; 22 Bill Starr; Infielders: 27 Ossie Bluege; 25 Red Kress; 7 Joe Kuhel; 2 Buddy Lewis; 24 John Mihalic; 1 Buddy Myer; 5 Cecil Travis	Outfielders: 4 Ben Chapman; 3 Jesse Hill; 24 Dee Miles; 4 Jake Powell; 8 Carl Reynolds; 19 Fred Sington; 6 John Stone; Other batters: 19 Bobby Estalella	Manager: 30 Bucky Harris; Coaches: 28 Nick Altrock; 26 Earl McNeely

== Player stats ==
=== Batting ===
==== Starters by position ====
Note: Pos = Position; G = Games played; AB = At bats; H = Hits; Avg. = Batting average; HR = Home runs; RBI = Runs batted in

Pos	Player	G	AB	H	Avg.	HR	RBI
C	Cliff Bolton	86	289	84	.291	2	51
1B	Joe Kuhel	149	588	189	.321	16	118
2B	Ossie Bluege	90	319	92	.288	1	55
SS	Cecil Travis	138	517	164	.317	2	92
3B	Buddy Lewis	143	601	175	.291	6	67
OF	Carl Reynolds	89	293	81	.276	4	41
OF	Ben Chapman	97	401	133	.332	4	60
OF	John Stone	123	437	149	.341	15	90

==== Other batters ====
Note: G = Games played; AB = At bats; H = Hits; Avg. = Batting average; HR = Home runs; RBI = Runs batted in

Player	G	AB	H	Avg.	HR	RBI
Red Kress	109	391	111	.284	8	51
Jesse Hill	85	233	71	.305	0	34
Wally Millies	74	215	67	.312	0	25
Jake Powell	53	210	62	.295	1	30
Buddy Myer	51	156	42	.269	0	15
Fred Sington	25	94	30	.319	1	28
John Mihalic	25	88	21	.239	0	8
Shanty Hogan	19	65	21	.323	1	7
Dee Miles	25	59	14	.237	0	7
Bobby Estalella	13	9	2	.222	0	0
Alex Sabo	4	8	3	.375	0	1
Bill Starr	1	0	0	----	0	0

=== Pitching ===
==== Starting pitchers ====
Note: G = Games pitched; IP = Innings pitched; W = Wins; L = Losses; ERA = Earned run average; SO = Strikeouts

Player	G	IP	W	L	ERA	SO
Bobo Newsom	43	285.2	17	15	4.32	156
Jimmie DeShong	34	223.2	18	10	4.63	59
Earl Whitehill	28	212.1	14	11	4.87	63
Joe Cascarella	22	139.1	9	8	4.07	34

==== Other pitchers ====
Note: G = Games pitched; IP = Innings pitched; W = Wins; L = Losses; ERA = Earned run average; SO = Strikeouts

Player	G	IP	W	L	ERA	SO
Pete Appleton	38	201.2	14	9	3.53	77
Monte Weaver	26	91.0	6	4	4.35	15
Ed Linke	13	52.0	1	5	7.10	11
Jack Russell	18	49.2	3	2	6.34	6
Firpo Marberry	5	14.0	0	2	3.86	4
Joe Bokina	5	8.1	0	2	8.64	5
Bill Phebus	2	7.1	0	0	2.45	4

==== Relief pitchers ====
Note: G = Games pitched; W = Wins; L = Losses; SV = Saves; ERA = Earned run average; SO = Strikeouts

Player	G	W	L	SV	ERA	SO
Syd Cohen	19	0	2	1	5.25	21
Henry Coppola	6	0	0	1	4.50	2
Bill Dietrich	5	0	1	0	9.72	4
Ken Chase	1	0	0	0	11.57	1

== Farm system ==
Level	Team	League	Manager
A1	Chattanooga Lookouts	Southern Association	Clyde Milan, John Mihalic, Alex McColl, Joe Engel and Joe Bonowitz
D	Sanford Lookouts	Florida State League	Stuffy McCrone and Bill Rodgers
