= 1936 Chicago White Sox season =

1936 Chicago White Sox
- League: American League
- Ballpark: Comiskey Park
- City: Chicago
- Owners: J. Louis Comiskey
- General manager: Harry Grabiner
- Managers: Jimmy Dykes
- Radio: WCFL (Hal Totten); WGN (Bob Elson); WIND (Russ Hodges); WJJD (John O'Hara)

The 1936 Chicago White Sox season was the White Sox's 36th season in the major leagues, and their 37th season overall. They finished with a record of 81–70, good enough for fourth place in the American League, 20 games behind the first place New York Yankees. It was the team's first winning season in 10 years.

== Offseason ==
- December 10, 1935: Al Simmons was purchased from the White Sox by the Detroit Tigers for $75,000.

== Regular season ==
=== Season standings ===
American League
Team	W	L	Pct.	GB	Home	Road
New York Yankees	102	51	.667	—	56‍–‍21	46‍–‍30
Detroit Tigers	83	71	.539	19½	44‍–‍33	39‍–‍38
Washington Senators	82	71	.536	20	42‍–‍35	40‍–‍36
Chicago White Sox	81	70	.536	20	43‍–‍32	38‍–‍38
Cleveland Indians	80	74	.519	22½	49‍–‍30	31‍–‍44
Boston Red Sox	74	80	.481	28½	47‍–‍29	27‍–‍51
St. Louis Browns	57	95	.375	44½	31‍–‍43	26‍–‍52
Philadelphia Athletics	53	100	.346	49	31‍–‍46	22‍–‍54

=== Record vs. opponents ===
1936 American League record Sources:
Team	BOS	CWS	CLE	DET	NYY	PHA	SLB	WSH
Boston	—	12–10	9–13	13–9	15–7–1	13–9	12–10	8–14
Chicago	10–12	—	12–10–1	8–14	7–14	15–7	13–8–1	16–5
Cleveland	13–9	10–12–1	—	9–13	6–16–1	13–9	15–7–1	14–8
Detroit	9–13	14–8	13–9	—	8–14	17–5	11–11	11–11
New York	15–7–1	14–7	16–6–1	14–8	—	16–6	14–8	13–9
Philadelphia	9–13	7–15	9–13	5–17	6–16	—	11–10–1	6–16
St. Louis	10–12	8–13–1	7–15–1	11–11	8–14	10–11–1	—	3–19
Washington	14–8	5–16	8–14	11–11	9–13	16–16	19–3	—

=== Roster ===
1936 Chicago White Sox
Roster
Pitchers: 20,26 Clint Brown; 17 Sugar Cain; 30,47 Italo Chelini; 18,20 Bill Dietrich; 28 Red Evans; 24 Vern Kennedy; 16 Ted Lyons; 29 Ray Phelps; 29 Bill Shores; 25 Monty Stratton; 17 Les Tietje; 34,20 John Whitehead; 19 Whit Wyatt	Catchers: 35 Frank Grube; 14 Luke Sewell; 15 Merv Shea; Infielders: 4 Luke Appling; 3 Zeke Bonura; 5 Jimmy Dykes; 37 Jackie Hayes; 27 Jo-Jo Morrissey; 2 Tony Piet; 19 Les Rock	Outfielders: 6 Mule Haas; 8 Mike Kreevich; 9 Rip Radcliff; 12 Larry Rosenthal; 7 George Stumpf; 32,45 Dixie Walker; 12 George Washington	Manager: 5 Jimmy Dykes; Coaches: 33 Jimmy Austin; 38 Muddy Ruel; 22 Bill Webb

== Player stats ==
=== Batting ===
==== Starters by position ====
Note: Pos = Position; G = Games played; AB = At bats; H = Hits; Avg. = Batting average; HR = Home runs; RBI = Runs batted in.

Pos	Player	G	AB	H	Avg.	HR	RBI
C	Luke Sewell	128	451	113	.251	5	73
1B	Zeke Bonura	148	587	194	.330	12	138
2B	Jackie Hayes	108	417	130	.312	5	84
SS	Luke Appling	138	526	204	.388	6	128
3B	Jimmy Dykes	127	435	116	.267	7	60
OF	Mike Kreevich	137	550	169	.307	5	69
OF	Rip Radcliff	138	618	207	.335	8	82
OF	Mule Haas	119	408	116	.284	0	46

==== Other batters ====
Note: G = Games played; AB = At bats; H = Hits; Avg. = Batting average; HR = Home runs; RBI = Runs batted in.

Player	G	AB	H	Avg.	HR	RBI
Tony Piet	109	352	96	.273	7	42
Larry Rosenthal	85	317	89	.281	3	46
Frank Grube	33	93	15	.161	0	11
Dixie Walker	26	70	19	.271	0	11
George Washington	20	49	8	.163	1	5
Jo-Jo Morrissey	17	38	7	.184	0	6
Merv Shea	14	24	3	.125	0	2
George Stumpf	10	22	6	.273	0	5
Les Rock	2	1	0	.000	0	1

=== Pitching ===
==== Starting pitchers ====
Note: G = Games pitched; IP = Innings pitched; W = Wins; L = Losses; ERA = Earned run average; SO = Strikeouts.

Player	G	IP	W	L	ERA	SO
Vern Kennedy	35	274.1	21	9	4.63	99
John Whitehead	34	230.2	13	13	4.64	70
Sugar Cain	30	195.1	14	10	4.75	42
Ted Lyons	26	182.0	10	13	5.14	48
Monty Stratton	16	95.0	5	7	5.21	37
Bill Dietrich	14	82.2	4	4	4.68	39

==== Other pitchers ====
Note: G = Games pitched; IP = Innings pitched; W = Wins; L = Losses; ERA = Earned run average; SO = Strikeouts.

Player	G	IP	W	L	ERA	SO
Italo Chelini	18	83.2	4	3	4.95	16
Ray Phelps	15	68.2	4	6	6.03	17

==== Relief pitchers ====
Note: G = Games pitched; W = Wins; L = Losses; SV = Saves; ERA = Earned run average; SO = Strikeouts.

Player	G	W	L	SV	ERA	SO
Clint Brown	38	6	2	5	4.99	19
Red Evans	17	0	3	1	7.61	19
Bill Shores	9	0	0	0	9.53	5
Whit Wyatt	3	0	0	1	0.00	0
Les Tietje	2	0	0	0	27.00	3

== Farm system ==
Level	Team	League	Manager
A1	Dallas Steers	Texas League	Alex Gaston
C	Longview Cannibals	East Texas League	Tex Jeanes
D	Cassville Blues	Arkansas–Missouri League	Gary Coker and Cliff Clay
D	Rayne Rice Birds	Evangeline League	Harold Funk
D	Crookston Pirates	Northern League	Ken Penner
