= 1936 in baseball =

The following are the baseball events of the year 1936 throughout the world.

== Champions ==
=== Major League Baseball ===
- World Series: New York Yankees over New York Giants (4–2)
- All-Star Game, July 7 at Braves Field: National League, 4–3

=== Other champions ===
- Negro League Baseball All-Star Game: East, 10–2

== Awards and honors ==
- Baseball Hall of Fame
  - Ty Cobb
  - Babe Ruth
  - Honus Wagner
  - Christy Mathewson
  - Walter Johnson
- Most Valuable Player
  - American League: Lou Gehrig, New York Yankees, 1B
  - National League: Carl Hubbell, New York Giants, P
- The Sporting News Player of the Year Award
  - Carl Hubbell, New York Giants, P
- The Sporting News Manager of the Year Award
  - Joe McCarthy, New York Yankees

== Statistical leaders ==
	American League		National League		Negro National League	
Stat	Player	Total	Player	Total	Player	Total
AVG	Luke Appling (CWS)	.388	Paul Waner (PIT)	.373	Josh Gibson^{1} (PC)	.389
HR	Lou Gehrig (NYY)	49	Mel Ott (NYG)	33	Josh Gibson^{1} (PC)	18
RBI	Hal Trosky (CLE)	162	Joe Medwick (STL)	138	Josh Gibson^{1} (PC)	66
W	Tommy Bridges (DET)	23	Carl Hubbell (NYG)	26	Leroy Matlock (PC)	10
ERA	Lefty Grove (BOS)	2.81	Carl Hubbell (NYG)	2.31	Jim Willis (WEG)	2.84
K	Tommy Bridges (DET)	175	Van Lingle Mungo (BRO)	238	Satchel Paige (PC)	72

^{1} Negro National League Triple Crown batting winner

== Major league baseball final standings ==
=== American League final standings ===
American League
Team	W	L	Pct.	GB	Home	Road
New York Yankees	102	51	.667	—	56‍–‍21	46‍–‍30
Detroit Tigers	83	71	.539	19½	44‍–‍33	39‍–‍38
Washington Senators	82	71	.536	20	42‍–‍35	40‍–‍36
Chicago White Sox	81	70	.536	20	43‍–‍32	38‍–‍38
Cleveland Indians	80	74	.519	22½	49‍–‍30	31‍–‍44
Boston Red Sox	74	80	.481	28½	47‍–‍29	27‍–‍51
St. Louis Browns	57	95	.375	44½	31‍–‍43	26‍–‍52
Philadelphia Athletics	53	100	.346	49	31‍–‍46	22‍–‍54

Locations of teams for the 1934–1939 American League seasons
American League

=== National League final standings ===
National League
Team	W	L	Pct.	GB	Home	Road
New York Giants	92	62	.597	—	52‍–‍26	40‍–‍36
St. Louis Cardinals	87	67	.565	5	43‍–‍33	44‍–‍34
Chicago Cubs	87	67	.565	5	50‍–‍27	37‍–‍40
Pittsburgh Pirates	84	70	.545	8	46‍–‍30	38‍–‍40
Cincinnati Reds	74	80	.481	18	42‍–‍34	32‍–‍46
Boston Bees	71	83	.461	21	35‍–‍43	36‍–‍40
Brooklyn Dodgers	67	87	.435	25	37‍–‍40	30‍–‍47
Philadelphia Phillies	54	100	.351	38	30‍–‍48	24‍–‍52

Locations of teams for the 1936–1937 National League seasons
National League

== Negro leagues final standings ==
All Negro leagues standings below are per Seamheads.

=== Negro National League final standings ===
vs. Negro National League						vs. Major Black teams			
Negro National League	W	L	T	Pct.	GB	W	L	T	Pct.
New York Black Yankees	19	13	1	.591	3½	30	19	1	.610
^{(1)} Pittsburgh Crawfords	48	35	2	.576	—	54	42	2	.561
New York Cubans	25	24	1	.510	6	42	29	1	.590
Homestead Grays	29	29	1	.500	6½	40	39	3	.506
Newark Eagles	32	36	1	.471	8½	39	37	2	.513
^{(2)} Washington Elite Giants	28	34	1	.452	9½	36	46	1	.440
Philadelphia Stars	34	44	1	.437	11½	44	50	1	.468

^{(1)} First half champion ^{(2)} Second half champion
Locations of teams for the 1936 Negro National League season
Negro National League

=== Independent teams final standings ===
A loose confederation of teams existed that were not part of the Negro National League.

vs. All Teams
Independent Clubs	W	L	T	Pct.	GB
Kansas City Monarchs	13	7	0	.867	—
NNL All Stars	3	2	0	.333	2½
Chicago American Giants	13	12	1	.478	2½
Brooklyn Royal Giants	3	8	1	.200	5½
St. Louis Stars	1	4	0	.200	4½
Cuban Stars (East)	1	6	0	.333	5½
Cincinnati Tigers	2	13	0	.167	8½
Philadelphia Bacharach Giants	0	7	0	.000	6½

== Events ==
=== January–April ===
- January 4 – The Philadelphia Athletics trade Doc Cramer and Eric McNair to the Boston Red Sox for Hank Johnson, Al Niemiec and $75,000.
- January 6 – New York Giants President Charles A. Stoneham dies of Bright's disease. He was the last surviving member of the trio that purchased the team in 1919. His son, Horace Stoneham, is elected the team's new president. Stoneham‚ 32‚ will remain president for the next 40 years before selling the team in 1976.
- January 13 – The Philadelphia Phillies released Dino Chiozza and Bubber Jonnard.
- January 15 – The Chunichi Dragons of Nagoya‚ Japan‚ are officially formed. Eight days later the Hankyu Braves of Nishinomiya joined them.
- January 16 – Days after being released by the Chicago Cubs, Freddie Lindstrom is signed by the Brooklyn Dodgers, the last stop n a career that would eventually lead to the hall of fame.
- February 2 – The baseball writers vote for the first players to be named to the new Baseball Hall of Fame. Ty Cobb‚ Babe Ruth‚ Honus Wagner‚ Christy Mathewson and Walter Johnson each receive the requisite 75 percent of ballots cast. Active players also are eligible in this first election‚ with Rogers Hornsby finishing 9th‚ Mickey Cochrane 10th‚ Lou Gehrig 15th‚ and Jimmie Foxx 19th. Hal Chase receives 11 votes for 25th place‚ and Shoeless Joe Jackson has two votes to tie for 36th place.
- February 5 – Japanese Baseball League, the first professional baseball league in Asia, is founded (as predecessor of Nippon Professional Baseball).
- March 17 – Rookie Joe DiMaggio makes his spring debut with the New York Yankees, collecting four hits‚ including a triple, in an 8–7 victory over the St. Louis Cardinals.
- March 21 – The Cincinnati Reds trade Jim Bottomley to the St. Louis Browns for Johnny Burnett.
- April 14 – Opening day, the New York Yankees are shut out, 1–0, by Bobo Newsom and the Washington Senators.
  - In St. Louis, the Cardinals' Eddie Morgan becomes the first to hit a pinch-hit home run in his first major league at bat. Morgan connects on the very first pitch he sees in the 7th inning. The Cubs win, 12–7.
- April 16 – Johnny Mize makes his major league debut. He strikes out pinch hitting for Daffy Dean in the Cards' 5–3 loss to the Chicago Cubs.
- April 17 – The Brooklyn Dodgers released pitcher Tom Zachary, who would forever be remembered as the pitcher who surrendered Babe Ruth's then record setting 60th home run in 1927.
- April 26 – In the Brooklyn Dodgers' 10–7 victory over the Philadelphia Phillies, Dodgers shortstop Ben Geraghty reaches base twice on two separate interference calls on Phillies catcher Earl Grace.

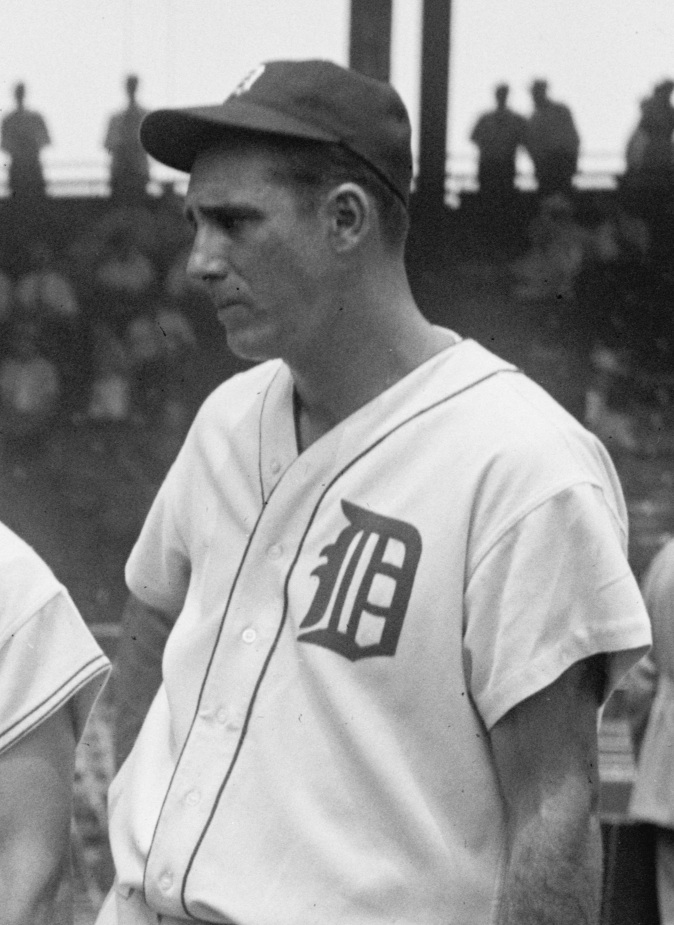
Hank Greenberg, Hall of Famer and 2-time MVP

- April 29:
  - Nagoya defeated Daitokyo 8–5 in the first professional baseball game in Japan.
  - Hank Greenberg breaks his wrist ending his season.
  - In St. Louis‚ Roy Parmelee‚ former New York Giants pitcher‚ beats Carl Hubbell, 2–1, in a seventeen inning duel. The game is scoreless until the 12th when the Giants score a run‚ but the Cardinals match it in the bottom of the 12th. Parmelee allows just six hits in 17 innings‚ while Hubbell gives up 11.

=== May–July ===
- May 3 – Joe DiMaggio makes his major league debut in left field in the New York Yankees' 14–5 victory over the St. Louis Browns. DiMaggio goes three-for-six- with a triple, an RBI and three runs scored.
- May 10 – The New York Yankees defeat the Philadelphia Athletics, 7–2. With a loss by the Boston Red Sox to the Washington Senators, the Yankees take over first place in the American League. They remain in first place for the rest of the season, winning the pennant by 19.5 games over the Detroit Tigers.
- May 11 – At Baker Bowl in Philadelphia, the Giants' Mel Ott drives in 8 runs in a 13–12 victory over the Phillies.
- May 12 – The St. Louis Browns' Pat Malone pitches a six hit shut out against the New York Yankees to end St. Louis' thirteen-game losing streak.
- May 21 – Chuck Klein goes home. The outfielder is traded back to the Philadelphia Phillies where he enjoyed his best years, along with pitcher Fabian Kowalik and $50,000. In return, the Cubs get outfielder Ethan Allen and pitcher Curt Davis.
- May 24 – The New York Yankees defeat the Philadelphia Athletics 25–2. Second baseman Tony Lazzeri has eleven RBIs in the game via two grand slams and a third home run and a triple. With his last blast, Lazzeri amassed seven home runs in four successive games to set a Major League record.
- June 6 – St. Louis Cardinals second baseman Stu Martin ties a major league record with eleven assists in the first game of a doubleheader with the New York Giants.
- June 14 – The Washington Senators trade Jake Powell to the New York Yankees for Ben Chapman.
- June 24 – In the New York Yankees' 18–11 victory over the Chicago White Sox, Joe DiMaggio has five RBIs with two home runs and two doubles.
- July 1 – The Detroit Tigers defeat the Chicago White Sox 21–6. Right fielder Gee Walker has a home run and seven RBIs.
- July 5 – The Boston Red Sox sweep a double header from the Philadelphia Athletics, bringing the A's losing streak to twelve games.
- July 7 – The National League records its first All-Star Game victory over the American League, 4–3, at Braves Field, home of the Boston Bees.
- July 10 – Philadelphia Phillies right-fielder Chuck Klein becomes the fourth player in Major League history to hit four home runs in a game. His final home run came in the top of the tenth inning, leading Philadelphia to a 9–6 win over the Pittsburgh Pirates The feat comes nearly 40 years to the day since it was last accomplished in the National League.
- July 16 – The Cincinnati Reds – Brooklyn Dodgers game is cancelled due to extreme heat.
- July 18 – The Chicago White Sox and Philadelphia Athletics set an American League record for the most combined runs scored by two teams in Chicago's 21–14 victory. White Sox outfielder Rip Radcliff ties an AL record with six hits in seven at-bats.
- July 19 – Bob Feller makes his major league debut on the mound for the Cleveland Indians.
- July 30:
  - The Boston Red Sox are the first Major League team to travel by aircraft to an away game, when they travel from St. Louis to play Chicago.
  - In International League action, Buffalo pitcher Bill Harris tosses his second no-hitter of the season‚ stopping Newark.

=== August–December ===
- August 2 – Down 9–1 in the fifth inning, and 11–3 in the seventh, the Chicago White Sox rally to defeat the Boston Red Sox 12–11 in extra innings. Jack Hayes drives in Larry Rosenthal for the game winning run.
- August 16 – The Philadelphia Phillies defeat the Boston Bees 7–0 behind a three hitter by Claude Passeau. The win ends the team's fourteen-game losing streak.
  - The Boston Bees purchase the contract of Rip Sewell from Buffalo of the International League.
- August 23 – Bob Feller makes his first career start, defeating the St. Louis Browns 4–1.
- August 28 – The New York Giants defeat the Pittsburgh Pirates 7–2 to bring their winning streak to fifteen games.
- September 9 – After sweeping the Cleveland Indians in a double header, the New York Yankees clinch the AL Pennant.
- September 16 – Birdie Tebbetts makes his major league debut behind the plate for the Detroit Tigers in a 6–2 victory over the Philadelphia A's.
- September 23
  - Carl Hubbell logs his sixteenth victory in a row to improve his record to 26–6.
  - The New York Yankees defeat the Philadelphia A's 12–5 for their 100th win of the season.
- September 30 – A solo home run by George Selkirk is all the offense the Yankees can muster up against Carl Hubbell in game one of the 1936 World Series, as the New York Giants take game one of the Subway Series, 6–1.
- October 2 – A seven run third inning, highlighted by Tony Lazzeri's grand slam, carries the Yankees to an 18–4 victory in game two of the World Series.
- October 3 – Frankie Crosetti's eighth inning RBI single carries the Yankees to a 2–1 victory over the Giants in game three of the World Series.
- October 4 – The Yankees jump to an early 4–0 lead against Carl Hubbell, and win game four of the World Series, 5–2.
- October 5 – Jo-Jo Moore leads off the tenth with a double, and comes around to score, as the New York Giants take game five of the World Series, 5–4.
- October 6 – The New York Yankees defeat the New York Giants, 13–5, in Game 6 of the World Series to win their fifth World Championship title, four games to two. During the six games, the Yankees score 43 runs and collect 65 hits.
- November 29 – Judge Landis declares Lee Handley and Johnny Peacock of the Cincinnati Reds free agents. They had been covered up on minor league teams by the Reds.
- December 4 – The Pittsburgh Pirates trade Ralph Birkofer and Cookie Lavagetto to the Brooklyn Dodgers for Ed Brandt, and sell Johnny Welch's contract to the Chicago White Sox.
- December 9 – The Philadelphia A's trade Pinky Higgins to the Boston Red Sox for Billy Werber.
- December 10 – In a three team trade, the Washington Senators send Earl Whitehill to the Cleveland Indians, Indians sent Thornton Lee to the Chicago White Sox, and the White Sox send Jack Salveson to the Senators.

== Births ==
=== January ===
- January 3 – Eddie Einhorn
- January 5:
  - Bud Bloomfield
  - Daryl Robertson
- January 6 – Rubén Amaro
- January 8:
  - Chuck Cottier
  - John DeMerit
- January 9:
  - Julio Navarro
  - Ralph Terry
- January 20 – Jesse Gonder
- January 23 – Don Nottebart
- January 24 – Dick Stigman
- January 25 – Buddy Pritchard

=== February ===
- February 5 – Lee Thomas
- February 7 – Frank Leja
- February 16 – Don Landrum
- February 20:
  - Wynn Hawkins
  - Shigeo Nagashima
- February 27 – Evans Killeen

=== March ===
- March 2:
  - Jim Brady
  - Don Schwall
- March 4 – Bob Johnson
- March 5 – Jacke Davis
- March 7 – Galen Cisco
- March 12 – Ray Barker
- March 13 – Don Miles
- March 20 – Jim Golden
- March 26 – Harry Kalas
- March 28 – Jimmie Coker

=== April ===
- April 1:
  - Ron Perranoski
  - Ted Sadowski
- April 3 – Don Rowe
- April 5 – Jimmie Schaffer
- April 6:
  - Wanita Dokish
  - Wayne Graham
- April 9 – Hal Jones
- April 15 – Leo Posada
- April 18 – Larry Foss
- April 24 – Glen Hobbie

=== May ===
- May 4 – John Tsitouris
- May 9 – Floyd Robinson
- May 14 – Dick Howser
- May 21 – Barry Latman
- May 25 – Marshall Renfroe
- May 30 – Mel Nelson

=== June ===
- June 1 – Jim McKnight
- June 13 – Carl Mathias
- June 22 – Jim Bronstad
- June 28 – Fred Gladding
- June 29 – Harmon Killebrew
- June 30 – Al Barks

=== July ===
- July 1 – Dick Drott
- July 5 – Jack Krol
- July 7 – Bill Kunkel
- July 15 – Gene Leek
- July 16 – Eddie Fisher
- July 20 – Jim McManus
- July 23 – Don Drysdale
- July 27 – Don Lock

=== August ===
- August 6 – Dave Gerard
- August 7:
  - Ron Henry
  - Jerry McNertney
  - Tex Nelson
- August 8 – Frank Howard
- August 9 – Julián Javier
- August 11 – Bill Monbouquette
- August 12:
  - Ellis Burton
  - Tom McAvoy
- August 15 – Mary Lou Graham
- August 17 – John Buzhardt
- August 20 – Cliff Cook
- August 28:
  - Don Denkinger
  - Tony González

=== September ===
- September 3:
  - Steve Boros
  - Lee Weyer
- September 4 – Jim McAnany
- September 5 – Bill Mazeroski
- September 7 – Charlie Lindstrom
- September 14 – Stan Williams
- September 15 – Freddie Burdette
- September 17 – Tom Carroll
- September 22 – Doug Camilli
- September 29 – Hal Trosky

=== October ===
- October 3 – Jack Lamabe
- October 15 – Red Swanson
- October 16 – Jack Baldschun
- October 26 – Elio Chacón
- October 27 – Lee Stange

=== November ===
- November 3:
  - Rick Herrscher
  - Earl Robinson
- November 12 – Joe Hoerner
- November 17:
  - Gary Bell
  - Larry Koentopp
- November 18 – Jay Hook
- November 20 – Jay Ritchie
- November 22 – Joe Gaines

=== December ===
- December 3:
  - Clay Dalrymple
  - Dave Eilers
- December 7 – Bo Belinsky
- December 10:
  - Doc Edwards
  - Jack Feller
- December 10 – Minoru Murayama
- December 13 – J. C. Martin
- December 16 – Duane Richards
- December 17:
  - Jerry Adair
  - Rollie Sheldon
- December 19 – Jack Kubiszyn
- December 20 – Dan Pfister
- December 21:
  - Ralph Lumenti
  - Howie Reed
- December 26 – Wayne Causey

== Deaths ==
=== January ===
- January 5 – Will Sawyer, 71, pitcher who played with the Cleveland Blues in the 1883 season.
- January 6 – Charles Stoneham, 59, owner of the New York Giants since 1919, during which period the team won five National League pennants and three World Series from 1921 to 1922 and 1933.
- January 11 – Turkey Gross, 39, shortstop for the 1925 Boston Red Sox.
- January 24 – Henry Youngman, 70, German infielder for the Pittsburgh Alleghenys in 1890.
- January 29 – Joe Delahanty, 60, outfielder for the St. Louis Cardinals from 1907 to 1909, and one of five Delahanty brothers who played in the Major Leagues.

=== February ===
- February 3 – Andy Boswell, 62, pitcher who played for the Washington Senators and New York Giants of the National League during the 1895 season.
- February 4 – Frank Jones, 77, shortstop and outfielder for the Detroit Wolverines in 1884.
- February 5 – Fred Blank, 61, pitcher who played briefly for the Cincinnati Reds in 1894.
- February 7 – Jimmy Dygert, 51, pitcher for the Philadelphia Athletics from 1905 to 1910, who pitched a combined no-hitter with Rube Waddell during the 1906 season.
- February 9 – Trick McSorley, 83, who played in six different positions for the St. Louis Red Stockings, Toledo Blue Stockings, St. Louis Maroons, and St. Louis Browns in parts of four seasons spanning 1875–1886.
- February 15 – Bill Grahame, 52, pitcher who played from 1908 through 1910 for the St. Louis Browns.
- February 17 – Tom York, 85, left fielder who played 15 seasons from 1871 to 1885, most prominently for the Providence Grays, and also managed them the entire first season of the team's existence in 1878.

=== March ===
- March 6 – Watty Lee, 56, outfielder and pitcher who played from 1901 through 1904 for the Washington Senators and Pittsburgh Pirates.
- March 7 – Tom Rogers, 44, pitcher for the St. Louis Browns, Philadelphia Athletics and New York Yankees in part of four seasons between 1917 and 1921.
- March 17 – Grant Thatcher, 59, pitcher for the Brooklyn Superbas during the 1903 and 1904 baseball seasons.
- March 21 – William McLaughlin, 74, shortstop for the 1884 Washington Nationals of the Union Association.
- March 24 – Charlie Parsons, 72, pitcher who played with the Boston Beaneaters, New York Metropolitans and Cleveland Spiders during three seasons spanning 1886–1990.
- March 25 – Art Hagan, 73, pitcher who played from 1883 to 1884 for the Philadelphia Quakers and Buffalo Bisons.
- March 26:
  - Ed Hawk, 48, pitcher for the 1911 St. Louis Browns of the American League.
  - Dan Costello, 44, backup outfielder who played from 1913 to 1916 for the New York Yankees and the Pittsburgh Pirates.
- March 30 – John Kull, 53, pitcher for the 1909 Philadelphia Athletics of the American League.
- March 31 – Anton Falch, 75, left fielder and catcher in five games for the Milwaukee Brewers of the Union Association in the 1884 season.

=== April ===
- April 14 – Dan Lally, 68, outfielder for the Pittsburgh Pirates in 1891 and the St. Louis Browns in 1897.
- April 24 – Tacks Latimer, 58, catcher who played from 1898 through for the New York Giants, Louisville Colonels, Pittsburgh Pirates, Baltimore Orioles and Brooklyn Superbas.

=== May ===
- May 5:
  - Bill Anderson, 71, pitcher for the Louisville Colonels in the 1889 season.
  - Lou Sylvester, 81, outfielder who played for the Cincinnati Outlaw Reds, Louisville Colonels, Cincinnati Red Stockings and St. Louis Browns in parts of three seasons spanning 1884–1887.
- May 12 – Frank Zinn, 70, catcher for the 1888 Philadelphia Athletics.
- May 19 – Sammy Curran, 61, pitcher for the Boston Beaneaters during the 1902 season.
- May 22 – Kaiser Wilhelm, 62, pitcher for the Pittsburgh Pirates, Boston Beaneaters, Brooklyn Superbas, and Baltimore Terrapins during seven seasons from 1904 to 1915, and also a player/manager for the 1921 Philadelphia Phillies.
- May 23 – Ted Lewis, 63, pitcher for the Boston Beaneaters and Boston Americans from 1896 to 1901, who led the National League with a .768 Win–loss % in 1898, and also one of only three Welsh-born ballplayers in Major League history, along with Jimmy Austin and Peter Morris.

=== June ===
- June 9 – Charlie Bartson, 71, pitcher who played for the Chicago Pirates of the Players' League during the 1890 season.
- June 16 – Billy Shindle, 75, third baseman for the Detroit Wolverines, Baltimore Orioles, Philadelphia Athletics and Phillies, and Brooklyn Bridegrooms from 1886 to 1898, also one of the first sluggers in the deadball era.
- June 18 – Al Nichols, 84, third baseman for the Brooklyn Atlantics, New York Mutuals and Louisville Grays from 1875 to 1877, who is credited as the first player born in England to reach the major leagues.
- June 21 – Ambrose Puttmann, 55, pitcher who played from 1903 through 1906 with the New York Highlanders and the St. Louis Cardinals.

=== July ===
- July 3 – Bill Niles, 69, third baseman who played for the Pittsburgh Pirates in the 1895 season.
- July 5 – Phil Wisner, 67, shortstop who played briefly for the Washington Senators of the National League in 1895.
- July 7 – Bill Pounds, 58, pitcher for the Cleveland Naps and Brooklyn Superbas in the 1903 season.
- July 15 – Ted Goulait, 46, pitcher for the 1912 New York Giants of the National League.
- July 17 – Joe Wall, 62, backup catcher in 16 games for the New York Giants and Brooklyn Superbas during the 1901 and 1902 seasons.

=== August ===
- August 6 – Charlie Girard, 51, pitcher for the 1910 Philadelphia Phillies in 1910.
- August 9:
  - Jim Mahady, 35, second baseman who played briefly with the New York Giants in 1921.
  - Ed Halbriter, 76, pitcher who played for the Philadelphia Athletics in the 1882 season.
- August 13 – Irv Hach, 63, backup infielder for the Louisville Colonels in 1897.
- August 15 – Lew Richie, 52, pitcher who played from 1906 through 1913 with the Philadelphia Phillies, Boston Doves and Chicago Cubs.
- August 28 – Youngy Johnson, 63, pitcher who played for the Philadelphia Phillies in 1897 and the New York Giants in 1899.

=== September ===
- September 8 – Bill Yerrick, 62, pitcher for the Boston Beaneaters of the National League in the 1895 and 1896 seasons.
- September 9 – William Betts, 75, umpire who officiated in the National League from 1894 to 1899 and the American League in 1901 and 1903.
- September 11 – Braggo Roth, 44, outfielder for the Chicago White Sox, Cleveland Indians, Philadelphia Athletics, Boston Red Sox, Washington Senators, and New York Yankees from 1914 through 1921, who led the American League in home runs in the 1915 season.
- September 16 – Henry Lampe, 63, pitcher for the Boston Beaneaters in 1894 and the Philadelphia Phillies in 1895.
- September 19 – Bill Hart, 71, National League pitcher who played with the Philadelphia Athletics, Brooklyn Grooms, Pittsburgh Pirates, St. Louis Browns, and Cleveland Blues in parts of seven seasons spanning 1886–1901.

=== October ===
- October 4 – Hercules Burnett, 67, center fielder who played for the Louisville Colonels in the 1888 and 1895 seasons.
- October 8 – Red Ames, 54, pitcher for the New York Giants, Cincinnati Reds, St. Louis Cardinals and Philadelphia Phillies from 1903 through 1919, who posted a career record of 183–167 wins with a 2.63 ERA and 1,702 strikeouts, and was a member of the World Champions Giants in 1904 and 1905.
- October 16 – Dennis Fitzgerald, 71, English-born shortstop for the Philadelphia Athletics of the American Association in 1890.
- October 19 – Jumping Jack Jones, 75, pitcher who played for the Detroit Wolverines and Philadelphia Athletics during the 1883 season.
- October 20 – George Kelb, 66, pitcher for the 1898 Cleveland Spiders of the National League in 1898.
- October 21 – Charlie Mason, outfielder who played with the Philadelphia Centennials, Washington Nationals, and Philadelphia Athletics in part of two seasons between 1875 and 1883.
- October 22 – Fred Olmstead, 55, pitcher who played from 1908 through 1911 for the Chicago White Sox.
- October 27 – Dave Black, 44, pitcher who played for the Chicago ChiFeds/Whales and Baltimore Terrapins of the Federal League from 1914 to 1915, and the Boston Red Sox in 1923.
- October 30 – Jack Morrissey, 60, second baseman for the Cincinnati Reds from 1902 to 1903.
- October 31 – Deacon McGuire, 72, catcher for 13 different teams over 26 seasons, who set a record number of seasons for a record number of teams, set career catching marks for defensive games, putouts, assists, caught stealing and stolen bases against, and was the first catcher to collect 300 doubles and hit .300 five times, before becoming a long time coach and manager.

=== November ===
- November 9:
  - Bill Stellberger, 71, pitcher for the 1885 Providence Grays.
  - Carl Stimson, 42, pitcher who played with the Boston Red Sox in the 1923 season.
- November 27 – Shad Barry, 58, backup catcher and outfielder who played from 1899 through 1908 for seven different National League clubs, most prominently for the Philadelphia Phillies.
- November 29 – Ri Jones, 77, infield utility man who played with the Louisville Eclipse in 1883 and the Cincinnati Outlaw Reds in 1884.

=== December ===
- December 11 – Moose Grimshaw, 61, right fielder who played from 1905 through 1907 for the Boston Americans.
- December 21 – Fred Gunkle, 79, catcher and right fielder for the Cleveland Blues in 1879.
- December 24 – Ren Deagle, 78, pitcher who played from 1883 to 1884 with the Cincinnati Red Stockings and Louisville Eclipse.
- December 26 – Bill Clymer, 63, shortstop for the Philadelphia Athletics during the 1891 season.
- December 29 – Bill Prough, 49, pitcher for the 1912 Cincinnati Reds.
- December 31 – Doc Casey, 66, third baseman who played from 1898 to 1907 with the Washington Senators, Brooklyn Superbas, Detroit Tigers and Chicago Cubs.
