= 1936 Boston Red Sox season =

Major League Baseball season

1936 Boston Red Sox
- League: American League
- Ballpark: Fenway Park
- City: Boston, Massachusetts
- Record: 74–80 (.481)
- League place: 6th
- Owners: Tom Yawkey
- President: Tom Yawkey
- General managers: Eddie Collins
- Managers: Joe Cronin
- Radio: WNAC (Fred Hoey)
- Stats: ESPN.com; Baseball Reference

The 1936 Boston Red Sox season was the 36th season in the franchise's Major League Baseball history. The Red Sox finished sixth in the American League (AL) with a record of 74 wins and 80 losses, 28 1/2 games behind the New York Yankees, who went on to win the 1936 World Series.

== Offseason ==
- December 10, 1935: Gordon Rhodes, George Savino (minors), and $150,000 were traded by the Red Sox to the Philadelphia Athletics for Jimmie Foxx and Johnny Marcum.

== Regular season ==
=== Season standings ===
American League
Team	W	L	Pct.	GB	Home	Road
New York Yankees	102	51	.667	—	56‍–‍21	46‍–‍30
Detroit Tigers	83	71	.539	19½	44‍–‍33	39‍–‍38
Washington Senators	82	71	.536	20	42‍–‍35	40‍–‍36
Chicago White Sox	81	70	.536	20	43‍–‍32	38‍–‍38
Cleveland Indians	80	74	.519	22½	49‍–‍30	31‍–‍44
Boston Red Sox	74	80	.481	28½	47‍–‍29	27‍–‍51
St. Louis Browns	57	95	.375	44½	31‍–‍43	26‍–‍52
Philadelphia Athletics	53	100	.346	49	31‍–‍46	22‍–‍54

=== Record vs. opponents ===
1936 American League record Sources:
Team	BOS	CWS	CLE	DET	NYY	PHA	SLB	WSH
Boston	—	12–10	9–13	13–9	15–7–1	13–9	12–10	8–14
Chicago	10–12	—	12–10–1	8–14	7–14	15–7	13–8–1	16–5
Cleveland	13–9	10–12–1	—	9–13	6–16–1	13–9	15–7–1	14–8
Detroit	9–13	14–8	13–9	—	8–14	17–5	11–11	11–11
New York	15–7–1	14–7	16–6–1	14–8	—	16–6	14–8	13–9
Philadelphia	9–13	7–15	9–13	5–17	6–16	—	11–10–1	6–16
St. Louis	10–12	8–13–1	7–15–1	11–11	8–14	10–11–1	—	3–19
Washington	14–8	5–16	8–14	11–11	9–13	16–16	19–3	—

=== Opening Day lineup ===
5	Billy Werber	RF
8	Doc Cramer	CF
7	Heinie Manush	LF
3	Jimmie Foxx	1B
6	Joe Cronin	SS
4	Eric McNair	3B
2	Rick Ferrell	C
24	Ski Melillo	2B
12	Wes Ferrell	P

=== Roster ===
1936 Boston Red Sox
Roster
Pitchers: 16 Stew Bowers; 19 Joe Cascarella; 16 Emerson Dickman; 12 Wes Ferrell; 10 Lefty Grove; 21 Jim Henry; 11 Johnny Marcum; 16 Mike Meola; -- Ted Olson; 14 Fritz Ostermueller; -- Jennings Poindexter; 17 Jack Russell; 15 Rube Walberg; 17 Johnny Welch; 18 Jack Wilson	Catchers: 22 Moe Berg; 23 George Dickey; 2 Rick Ferrell; Infielders: 6 Joe Cronin; 16 Babe Dahlgren; 3 Jimmie Foxx; 26 John Kroner; 4 Eric McNair; 24 Ski Melillo; 5 Billy Werber	Outfielders: 1 Mel Almada; 9 Dusty Cooke; 8 Doc Cramer; 25 Fabian Gaffke; 7 Heinie Manush; 27 Bing Miller	Manager: 6 Joe Cronin; Coaches: 30 Tom Daly; 31 Herb Pennock (Pitching); 32 Al Schacht (Third base)

== Player stats ==
=== Batting ===
==== Starters by position ====
Note: Pos = Position; G = Games played; AB = At bats; H = Hits; Avg. = Batting average; HR = Home runs; RBI = Runs batted in

Pos	Player	G	AB	H	Avg.	HR	RBI
C	Rick Ferrell	121	410	128	.312	8	55
1B	Jimmie Foxx	155	585	198	.338	41	143
2B	Ski Melillo	98	327	74	.226	0	32
SS	Eric McNair	128	494	141	.285	4	74
3B	Billy Werber	145	535	147	.275	10	67
OF	Doc Cramer	154	643	188	.292	0	41
OF	Mel Almada	96	320	81	.253	1	21
OF	Dusty Cooke	111	341	93	.273	6	47

==== Other batters ====
Note: G = Games played; AB = At bats; H = Hits; Avg. = Batting average; HR = Home runs; RBI = Runs batted in

Player	G	AB	H	Avg.	HR	RBI
Heinie Manush	82	313	91	.291	0	45
John Kroner	84	298	87	.292	4	62
Joe Cronin	81	295	83	.281	2	43
Moe Berg	39	125	30	.240	0	19
Babe Dahlgren	16	57	16	.281	1	7
Fabian Gaffke	15	55	7	.127	1	3
Bing Miller	30	47	14	.298	1	6
George Dickey	10	23	1	.043	0	0

=== Pitching ===
==== Starting pitchers ====
Note: G = Games pitched; IP = Innings pitched; W = Wins; L = Losses; ERA = Earned run average; SO = Strikeouts

Player	G	IP	W	L	ERA	SO
Wes Ferrell	39	301.0	20	15	4.19	106
Lefty Grove	35	253.1	17	12	2.81	130
Johnny Marcum	31	174.0	8	13	4.81	57
Jennings Poindexter	3	10.2	0	2	6.75	2

==== Other pitchers ====
Note: G = Games pitched; IP = Innings pitched; W = Wins; L = Losses; ERA = Earned run average; SO = Strikeouts

Player	G	IP	W	L	ERA	SO
Fritz Ostermueller	43	180.2	10	16	4.88	90
Jack Wilson	43	136.1	6	8	4.42	74
Rube Walberg	24	100.1	5	4	4.40	49
Jim Henry	21	76.1	5	1	4.60	36
Johnny Welch	9	32.2	2	1	5.51	9
Mike Meola	6	21.1	0	2	5.48	8
Ted Olson	5	18.1	1	1	7.36	5

==== Relief pitchers ====
Note: G = Games pitched; W = Wins; L = Losses; SV = Saves; ERA = Earned run average; SO = Strikeouts

Player	G	W	L	SV	ERA	SO
Jack Russell	23	0	3	0	5.63	9
Joe Cascarella	10	0	2	0	6.97	7
Stew Bowers	5	0	0	0	5.93	0
Emerson Dickman	1	0	0	0	9.00	2

== Farm system ==
Level	Team	League	Manager
AA	Syracuse Chiefs	International League	Nemo Leibold and Mike Kelly
AA	San Diego Padres	Pacific Coast League	Frank Shellenback
A1	Little Rock Travelers	Southern Association	Doc Prothro
A	Elmira Colonels	New York–Pennsylvania League	Rabbit Maranville
B	Rocky Mount Red Sox	Piedmont League	Specs Toporcer
C	Helena Seaporters	Cotton States League	Rod Whitney
C	Canton Terriers	Middle Atlantic League	Floyd "Pat" Patterson
D	Danville-Schoolfield Leafs	Bi-State League	Herb Brett
D	Eau Claire Bears	Northern League	Johnny Mostil

LEAGUE CHAMPIONS: Eau Claire
