= Jimmie DeShong =

American baseball player (1909-1993)

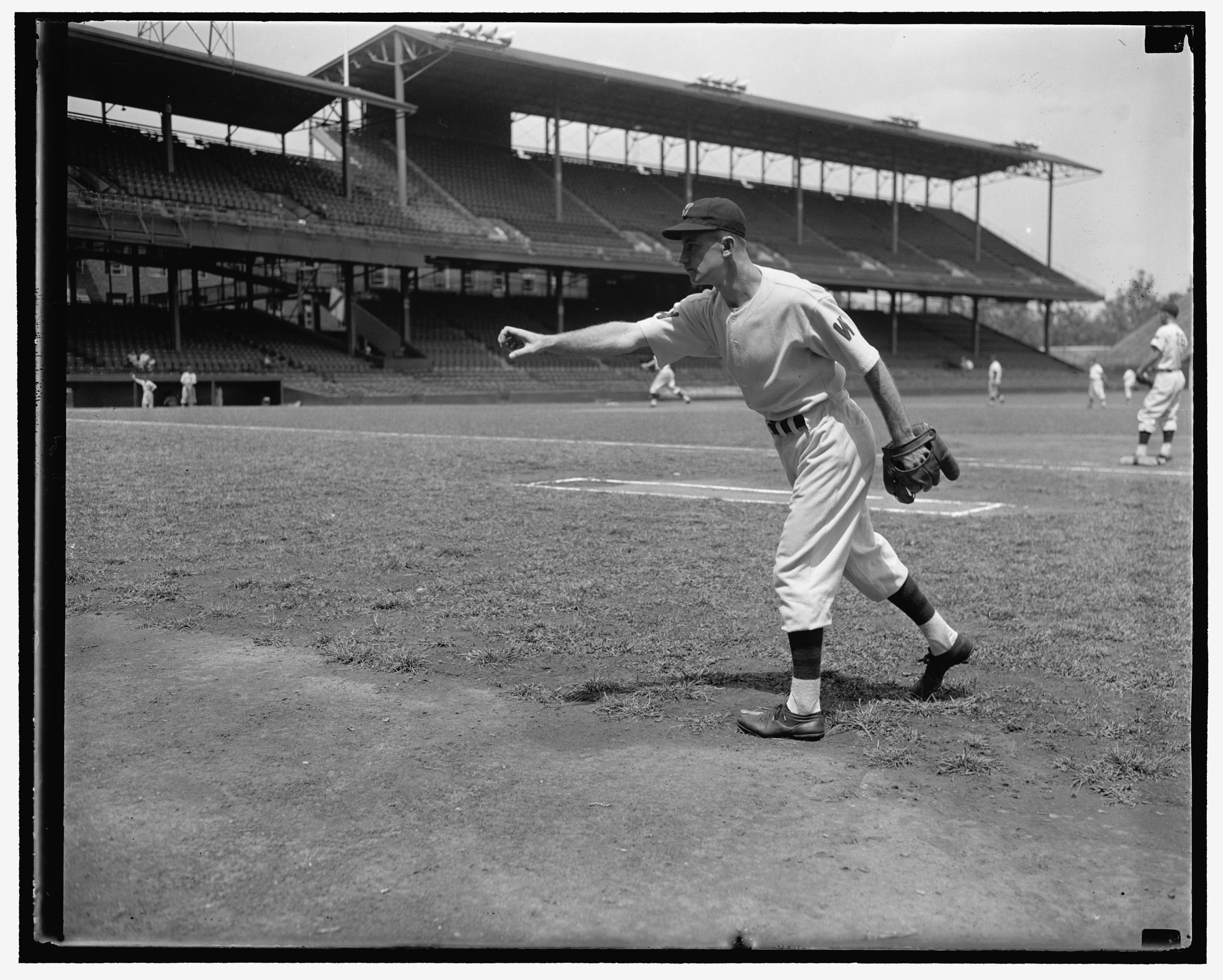
- Pitcher
- Born: November 30, 1909; Harrisburg, Pennsylvania, U.S.
- Died: October 16, 1993 (aged 83); Lower Paxton Township, Pennsylvania, U.S.
- Batted: Right Threw: Right

MLB debut
- April 12, 1932, for the Philadelphia Athletics

Last MLB appearance
- June 10, 1939, for the Washington Senators

MLB statistics
- Win–loss record: 47–44
- Earned run average: 5.08
- Strikeouts: 273
- Stats at Baseball Reference

Teams
- Philadelphia Athletics (1932); New York Yankees (1934–1935); Washington Senators (1936–1939)

James Brooklyn DeShong (November 30, 1909 – October 16, 1993) was an American professional baseball pitcher who appeared in 175 games in Major League Baseball (MLB) for the Philadelphia Athletics (1932), New York Yankees (1934–1935) and Washington Senators (1936–1939). Born in Harrisburg, Pennsylvania, he threw and batted right-handed and was listed as 5 feet 11 inches (1.80 m) tall and 165 pounds (75 kg).

DeShong's playing career lasted for 14 seasons (1928–1941). His MLB service saw him miss, by one year, two dynasties: the 1929–1931 Athletics and the 1936–1939 Yankees. However, he enjoyed a stellar campaign as a member of the 1936 Senators, posting an 18–10 won–lost record and finishing eighth in the American League in victories. His high win total in 1936 was accompanied by a mediocre 4.63 earned run average, and he permitted 255 hits (among them, 11 home runs) and 96 bases on balls in 2232/3 innings pitched, with only 59 strikeouts.

Overall, in his 175 games, which included an even 100 starts, he compiled a 47–44 record and a 5.08 career ERA, permitting 968 hits and 432 walks, with 273 strikeouts, in 8722/3 career innings pitched. He threw two shutouts and 44 complete games, and was credited with nine saves, then an unofficial statistic. On July 28, 1934, DeShong tossed a one-hitter against his former Philadelphia teammates, surrendering only a seventh-inning home run to Baseball Hall of Fame slugger Jimmie Foxx. He was a minor-league manager and a scout for the Athletics after retiring from the field.

Jimmie DeShong died at age 83 in Lower Paxton Township, Pennsylvania.
