= Billy Sullivan Jr. =

American baseball player (1910–1994)

Billy Sullivan
- Catcher / First baseman / Third baseman
- Born: October 23, 1910; Chicago, Illinois, U.S.
- Died: January 4, 1994 (aged 83); Sarasota, Florida, U.S.
- Batted: Left Threw: Right

MLB debut
- June 9, 1931, for the Chicago White Sox

Last MLB appearance
- September 3, 1947, for the Pittsburgh Pirates

MLB statistics
- Batting average: .289
- Home runs: 29
- Runs batted in: 388
- Stats at Baseball Reference

Teams
- Chicago White Sox (1931–1933); Cincinnati Reds (1935); Cleveland Indians (1936–1937); St. Louis Browns (1938–1939); Detroit Tigers (1940–1941); Brooklyn Dodgers (1942); Pittsburgh Pirates (1947)

William Joseph Sullivan Jr. (October 23, 1910 – January 4, 1994) was an American professional baseball player. He played in Major League Baseball as a catcher, first baseman and third baseman with the Chicago White Sox, Cincinnati Reds, Cleveland Indians, St. Louis Browns, Detroit Tigers, Brooklyn Dodgers and the Pittsburgh Pirates between 1931 and 1947.

== Baseball career ==
Sullivan was born in Chicago, Illinois and attended the University of Notre Dame where he played for the Notre Dame Fighting Irish baseball team in 1930 and 1931.

He finished 24th in voting for the 1932 American League Most Valuable Player Award for playing in 93 Games and having 97 hits in 307 at bats for a .316 batting average, along with 1 home run and 45 runs batted in. Sullivan had his best season in 1936 with Cleveland, when he had a .351 batting average with 32 doubles and 48 runs batted in.

In twelve major league seasons, Sullivan played in 962 Games and had 2,840 At Bats, 346 Runs, 820 Hits, 152 Doubles, 32 Triples, 29 Home Runs, 388 RBI, 30 Stolen Bases, 240 Walks, .289 Batting Average, .346 On-base percentage, .395 Slugging Percentage, 1,123 Total Bases and 39 Sacrifice Hits. Sullivan led National League catchers in 1938 with a .990 fielding percentage.

His father, Billy Sullivan, was also a major league catcher. Billy Jr and his father were the first father and son to have both played in a World Series, playing for the White Sox in 1906 (Billy Sr) and Tigers in 1940 (Billy Jr).

He died in Sarasota, Florida at the age of 83.

== See also ==
- List of second-generation Major League Baseball players
