= Fabian Gaffke =

American baseball player (1913–1992)

- Outfielder
- Born: August 5, 1913; Milwaukee, Wisconsin, U.S.
- Died: February 8, 1992 (aged 78); Milwaukee, Wisconsin, U.S.
- Batted: Right Threw: Right

MLB debut
- September 9, 1936, for the Boston Red Sox

Last MLB appearance
- August 12, 1942, for the Cleveland Indians

MLB statistics
- Batting average: .227
- Home runs: 7
- Runs batted in: 42
- Stats at Baseball Reference

Teams
- Boston Red Sox (1936–1939); Cleveland Indians (1941–1942)

Fabian Sebastian Gaffke (August 5, 1913 – February 8, 1992) was an American right fielder who played in Major League Baseball between 1936 and 1942 for the Boston Red Sox (1936–39) and Cleveland Indians (1941–42). Listed at 5 ft 10 in (1.78 m), 185 lb., Gaffke batted and threw right-handed. He was born in Milwaukee, Wisconsin.

In a six-season career, Gaffke was a .227 hitter (73-for-321) with seven home runs and 42 RBI in 129 games, including 43 runs, 14 doubles, four triples, and two stolen bases.

Gaffke died in his homeland of Milwaukee, Wisconsin at age 78.

== Sources ==
- Career statistics from MLB · ESPN · Baseball Reference · Fangraphs · Baseball Reference (Minors) · Retrosheet · Baseball Almanac
