= Paul Kardow =

American baseball player (1915–1968)

- Pitcher
- Born: September 19, 1915; Humble, Texas, U.S.
- Died: April 27, 1968 (aged 52); San Antonio, Texas, U.S.
- Batted: Right Threw: Right

MLB debut
- July 1, 1936, for the Cleveland Indians

Last MLB appearance
- July 4, 1936, for the Cleveland Indians

MLB statistics
- Win–loss record: 0–0
- Earned run average: 4.50
- Strikeouts: 0
- Stats at Baseball Reference

Teams
- Cleveland Indians (1936)

Paul Otto Kardow (September 19, 1915 – April 27, 1968), nicknamed "Tex", was an American Major League Baseball pitcher who played for one season. He pitched in two games for the Cleveland Indians during the 1936 Cleveland Indians season.
