= Elon Hogsett =

American baseball player (1903–2001)

- Hogsett in 1935
- Pitcher
- Born: November 2, 1903; Brownell, Kansas, U.S.
- Died: July 17, 2001 (aged 97); Hays, Kansas, U.S.
- Batted: Left Threw: Left

MLB debut
- September 18, 1929, for the Detroit Tigers

Last MLB appearance
- June 3, 1944, for the Detroit Tigers

MLB statistics
- Win–loss record: 63–87
- Earned run average: 5.02
- Strikeouts: 441
- Stats at Baseball Reference

Teams
- Detroit Tigers (1929–1936); St. Louis Browns (1936–1937); Washington Senators (1938); Detroit Tigers (1944)

Career highlights and awards
- World Series champion (1935)

Elon Chester "Chief" Hogsett (November 2, 1903 – July 17, 2001) was an American professional baseball pitcher who threw with a left-handed submarine motion. He played in Major League Baseball from 1929 to 1938 plus a final season in 1944, appearing in 330 games, 114 as a starter, compiling a 63–87 win–loss record with a 5.02 earned run average (ERA). He spent parts of nine seasons with the Detroit Tigers and pitched in the World Series in 1934 and 1935.

== Early years ==
Hogsett was born in 1903 on a farm in Ness County, Kansas. His parents were divorced in 1905, and his father moved to Illinois. His mother remarried in 1907 to Harry Cranston. His stepfather was an abusive alcoholic, and Hogsett left home when he was 14 years old, moving to Brownell, Kansas.

He pitched for the Brownell high school team and later for town teams, including one from Ness City, Kansas. He claimed to have developed his submarine pitching delivery as a result of his fondness for throwing stones underhanded as a boy. He later recalled, "I never passed a rock that I didn't pick up and throw somewhere." He reportedly ran the 100-yard dash in 10 seconds flat while in high school. He also attended Bethany College where he played college football as a back.

== Professional baseball ==
=== Minor leagues and the "Chief" nickname ===
Hogsett began playing professional baseball in 1925 for the Oklahoma-based Cushing Refiners in the Southwestern League. It was there that he was given the nickname "Chief." Hogsett recalled that his roommate was a full-blooded Kiowa Native American, and because of that, Hogsett was given the nickname. Hogsett offered a different account to a reporter in 1989, stating he was given the nickname while working as a bellhop in a hotel.

Although press accounts during his playing days sometimes referred to him as a "full-blooded Indian", Hogsett later claimed to be only one-thirty-second Cherokee, "maybe more", on his mother's side. During his major league career in Detroit, Hogsett was reportedly greeted with "war whoops" by the fans at Navin Field when he took the mound. While use of his nickname was not uncommon in print, contemporary newspapers mostly used his given name, Elon.

At the end of the 1925 season, the Detroit Tigers acquired his contract and assigned him to the Toronto Maple Leafs of the International League. He was subsequently sent to the lower minor leagues where he played in 1926 with the Fort Worth Panthers of the Texas League and the Marshall Snappers of the East Texas League, in 1927 with the Decatur Commodores of the Illinois–Indiana–Iowa League and the Wheeling Stogies of the Middle Atlantic League, and in 1928 with the Evansville Hubs of the Illinois–Indiana–Iowa League.

=== Montreal ===
In 1929, he returned to Double-A baseball with the Montreal Royals of the International League, compiling a 22–13 record with a 3.03 earned run average (ERA) in 37 games. While playing for Montreal, the local Iroquois tribe held a ceremony at the baseball park during which Hogsett was installed as "Chief Ranantasse", meaning "Chief Strong Arm", of the Six Nations Iroquois Confederacy. He became the most popular player on the Montreal club and was rated as the best left-handed pitcher in the International League.

=== Detroit Tigers ===
In August 1929, the Detroit Tigers acquired Hogsett from Montreal. He reported to the Tigers in September and made his major league debut on September 18. He appeared in four games, all as a starter, compiling a 1–2 record with a 2.83 ERA.

He appeared in 33 games for the Tigers in 1930 (17 of them as a starter), compiling a 9–8 record with a 5.42 ERA. He also led the American League with nine batters hit by pitch. Interviewed years later, Hogsett said: "Did I throw at hitters? Not at their heads. I'd throw at their feet or their knees. That was part of the game back then. The good hitters expected it. Of course, some took exception to it."

In 1931, Hogsett was hampered by a sore arm, compiled an 8–5 record in 22 games for Detroit, and spent part of the season rehabilitating with the Toronto Maple Leafs.

He had his best season in 1932, appearing in a career-high 47 games (15 as a starter) with an 11–9 record. He ranked among the American League leaders that year in with a 3.54 ERA (seventh), an Adjusted ERA+ of 133 (third), 47 games at pitcher (tied for fourth), seven saves (third), 28 games finished (second), and a 2.73 range factor per nine innings as pitcher (fifth).

In 1933, Hogsett became almost exclusively a relief pitcher, appearing in 45 games, only two as a starter. He led the American League with 34 games finished and finished the season with a 6–10 record and a 4.50 ERA.

Hogsett added a sidearm delivery to his pitching repertoire in 1934. That year, he appeared in 26 games, all in relief, with a 3–2 record and 4.29 ERA. He helped he Tigers win the American League pennant. In the 1934 World Series, Hogsett shined, appearing in three games, finished two of them, and compiled a 1.23 ERA.

He helped the Tigers win a second consecutive pennant in 1935. That year, Hogsett appeared in 40 games, all in relief, and led the American League with 30 games finished. He compiled a 6–6 record with a 3.54 ERA and an Adjusted ERA+ of 118. In the 1935 World Series, he appeared in one game, allowing no hits and no runs.

=== St. Louis Browns ===
Hogsett began the 1936 season with the Tigers, but, following an injury to Detroit first baseman Hank Greenberg, Hogsett was traded in late April to the St. Louis Browns in exchange for first baseman Jack Burns. In St. Louis, manager Rogers Hornsby decided to use Hogsett as a starting pitcher. On being told of his new assignment, Hogsett was "all but dumbfounded." He told Hornsby he had not started a game in three years and was concerned that his arm was not capable of pitching nine innings.

Hogsett started 29 games and led the 1936 Browns' pitching staff with 13 wins. He compiled a 5.52 ERA and led the American League's pitchers with six errors and 15 batters hit by pitch. The following year, he started 26 games with a 6.29 ERA and ranked second in the American League with 19 losses.

=== Washington Senators ===
In December 1937, the Browns traded Hogsett to the Washington Senators in exchange for pitcher Ed Linke. Hogsett appeared in 31 games, nine as a starter, for the 1937 Senators, compiling a 5–6 record and a 6.03 ERA. In December 1938, he was sold to the Boston Red Sox, but did not appear in any games for the club.

=== American Association ===
Hogsett continued pitching for six more years in the American Association. Between 1939 and 1941, he had strong seasons with the Minneapolis Millers, compiling a three-year record of 50–29. He played for the Indianapolis Indians in 1942 and split the 1943 season between Indianapolis and Minneapolis.

=== Brief return to the Tigers ===
In 1944, with personnel depleted due to World War II, Hogsett attempted a comeback with the Detroit Tigers. At age 40, he was the ninth oldest player in Major League Baseball that year. He made three relief appearances totaling 6 1/3 innings without allowing an earned run and appeared in his final major league game on June 3, 1944. On June 4, 1944, the Tigers released Hogsett to the Minneapolis Millers. He finished the season with the Millers, compiling a 5–7 record and a 6.83 ERA.

In 330 career games in the American League, Hogsett threw 1,222 innings with 114 games started, 160 games finished, and 33 saves. He also posted a .226 batting average (91-for-403) with 46 runs, six home runs and 27 RBIs.

== Family and later years ==
Hogsett was married in 1928 to Mabel Edith Wilson. They had two children: Virginia, born in 1935, and Stanley Gordon, born in 1940. Hogsett and Mabel remained married until Mabel's death in 1980.

After retiring from baseball, Hogsett worked as a sporting goods salesman. He later moved back to Kansas and worked for many years as a traveling liquor salesman. He lived in Hays, Kansas. After moving to a rest home, Hogsett died in 2001 at age 97.
