= Alex Sabo =

American baseball player (1910–2001)

- Catcher
- Born: February 14, 1910; New Brunswick, New Jersey, U.S.
- Died: January 3, 2001 (aged 90); Tuckerton, New Jersey, U.S.
- Batted: Right Threw: Right

MLB debut
- August 1, 1936, for the Washington Senators

Last MLB appearance
- August 1, 1937, for the Washington Senators

MLB statistics
- Games played: 5
- At bats: 8
- Hits: 3
- Stats at Baseball Reference

Teams
- Washington Senators (1936–1937)

Alexander Sabo (February 14, 1910 – January 3, 2001) was an American Major League Baseball catcher who played for the Washington Senators in 1936 and 1937. Sabo played college football and college baseball at Fordham University. He was later an assistant football coach at Rutgers University
