= Milt Galatzer =

American baseball player (1907–1976)

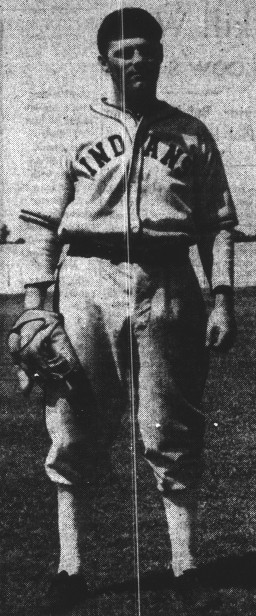
- Galatzer, circa 1939
- Outfielder
- Born: May 4, 1907; Chicago, Illinois, U.S.
- Died: January 29, 1976 (aged 68); San Francisco, California, U.S.
- Batted: Left Threw: Left

MLB debut
- June 25, 1933, for the Cleveland Indians

Last MLB appearance
- October 1, 1939, for the Cincinnati Reds

MLB statistics
- Batting average: .268
- Home runs: 1
- Runs batted in: 57
- Stats at Baseball Reference

Teams
- Cleveland Indians (1933–1936); Cincinnati Reds (1939)

Milton Galatzer (May 4, 1907 – January 29, 1976) was a Major League Baseball outfielder. He played professionally for the Cleveland Indians and the Cincinnati Reds.

== Early life ==
Galatzer was the middle of three children born to Harry and Ida (née Mishunsnik) Galatzer, and was Jewish. His older brother Barney was born in Russia before the family emigrated to the U.S., while he and his younger sister, Min, were born in Chicago. He graduated from Crane High School in Chicago.

== Professional career ==
Galatzer played in his first major league game on June 25, 1933, with the Cleveland Indians. He was in the major league for five seasons, playing with the Indians from 1933 until 1936 and then with the Cincinnati Reds until 1939. His best season was 1935 with the Indians when he had a batting average of .301 in 93 games.

== After MLB ==
After his major league career, Galatzer served in the U.S. Army during World War II. He returned to Chicago after his service, spending most of the rest of his life living in Chicago. He moved to California to live with his sister Min until his death two years later. Galatzer never married and had no children.

Galatzer died on January 29, 1976, in San Francisco, California.
