= George Stumpf =

American baseball player (1910–1993)

- Stumpf with the Reading Red Sox, c. 1933
- Outfielder
- Born: December 15, 1910; New Orleans, Louisiana, U.S.
- Died: March 6, 1993 (aged 82); Metairie, Louisiana, U.S.
- Batted: Left Threw: Left

MLB debut
- September 19, 1931, for the Boston Red Sox

Last MLB appearance
- May 6, 1936, for the Chicago White Sox

MLB statistics
- Batting average: .235
- Home runs: 1
- Runs batted in: 32
- Stats at Baseball Reference

Teams
- Boston Red Sox (1931–1933); Chicago White Sox (1936)

George Frederick Stumpf (December 15, 1910 – March 6, 1993) was an American professional baseball outfielder. He played in Major League Baseball (MLB) for the Boston Red Sox (1931–1933) and Chicago White Sox (1936). Listed at 5 feet 8 inches (1.73 m) and 155 pounds (70 kg), he batted and threw left-handed.

== Biography ==
Stumpf's minor league baseball career spanned 1929 to 1948, playing in 2217 total games for a more than 10 different teams.

Stumpf spent parts of four seasons in the major leagues. He appeared in seven games with the Boston Red Sox in 1931, followed by 79 games in 1932, and 22 games in 1933. In his 108 games with the Red Sox, he had a .231 batting average with one home run and 27 RBIs. His lone home run was hit off of Ted Lyons of the Chicago White Sox on August 24, 1932, at Fenway Park in Boston.

Stumpf briefly returned to the majors in 1936, appearing in 10 games with the White Sox, batting .273 (6-for-22) with five RBIs. Of his 118 total MLB appearances, he entered 40 games as a pinch hitter and six games as a pinch runner; he played defensively in 77 games (54 starts), all in the outfield. His overall batting average in MLB was .235; he had five stolen bases.

Stumpf served in the United States Army during World War II. He died in 1993, aged 82, at East Jefferson General Hospital in Metairie, Louisiana.
