= 1936 New York Yankees season =

Season for the Major League Baseball team the New York Yankees

1936 New York Yankees
- World Series champions American League champions
- League: American League
- Ballpark: Yankee Stadium
- City: New York City
- Record: 102–51 (.667)
- League place: 1st
- Owners: Jacob Ruppert
- General managers: Ed Barrow
- Managers: Joe McCarthy

The 1936 New York Yankees season was the team's 34th season. The team finished with a record of 102–51, winning their eighth pennant, finishing 19.5 games ahead of the Detroit Tigers. New York was managed by Joe McCarthy. The Yankees played at Yankee Stadium. In the World Series, they defeated the New York Giants in 6 games. After a 20-year absence, the "NY" logo returned to the front of the home jerseys where it has remained ever since.

The 1936 NY Yankees are the only team in the modern era (since 1901) to have 5 players (Bill Dickey, Lou Gehrig, Tony Lazzeri, Joe DiMaggio, and George Selkirk) with over 100+ RBIs in their regular lineup.

== Offseason ==
- Prior to 1936 season: Billy Johnson was signed as an amateur free agent by the Yankees.

== Regular season ==
- May 3, 1936: Joe DiMaggio made his major league debut, batting ahead of Lou Gehrig. The Yankees had not been to the World Series since 1932, but, thanks in large part to their sensational rookie, they won the 1936 World Series.
- May 24, 1936: Tony Lazzeri of the Yankees hit two grand slams in one game, the first time this had been accomplished in the major leagues.

=== Season standings ===
American League
Team	W	L	Pct.	GB	Home	Road
New York Yankees	102	51	.667	—	56‍–‍21	46‍–‍30
Detroit Tigers	83	71	.539	19½	44‍–‍33	39‍–‍38
Washington Senators	82	71	.536	20	42‍–‍35	40‍–‍36
Chicago White Sox	81	70	.536	20	43‍–‍32	38‍–‍38
Cleveland Indians	80	74	.519	22½	49‍–‍30	31‍–‍44
Boston Red Sox	74	80	.481	28½	47‍–‍29	27‍–‍51
St. Louis Browns	57	95	.375	44½	31‍–‍43	26‍–‍52
Philadelphia Athletics	53	100	.346	49	31‍–‍46	22‍–‍54

=== Record vs. opponents ===
1936 American League record Sources:
Team	BOS	CWS	CLE	DET	NYY	PHA	SLB	WSH
Boston	—	12–10	9–13	13–9	15–7–1	13–9	12–10	8–14
Chicago	10–12	—	12–10–1	8–14	7–14	15–7	13–8–1	16–5
Cleveland	13–9	10–12–1	—	9–13	6–16–1	13–9	15–7–1	14–8
Detroit	9–13	14–8	13–9	—	8–14	17–5	11–11	11–11
New York	15–7–1	14–7	16–6–1	14–8	—	16–6	14–8	13–9
Philadelphia	9–13	7–15	9–13	5–17	6–16	—	11–10–1	6–16
St. Louis	10–12	8–13–1	7–15–1	11–11	8–14	10–11–1	—	3–19
Washington	14–8	5–16	8–14	11–11	9–13	16–16	19–3	—

=== Roster ===
1936 New York Yankees
Roster
Pitchers: 20 Johnny Broaca; 17 Jumbo Brown; 11 Lefty Gomez; 14 Bump Hadley; 25 Ted Kleinhans; 21 Pat Malone; 19 Johnny Murphy; 16 Monte Pearson; 15 Red Ruffing; 24 Steve Sundra; 25 Kemp Wicker	Catchers: 8 Bill Dickey; 26 Joe Glenn; 18 Arndt Jorgens; Infielders: 5 Frankie Crosetti; 4 Lou Gehrig; 10 Don Heffner; 6 Tony Lazzeri; 2 Red Rolfe; 12 Jack Saltzgaver	Outfielders: 7 Ben Chapman; 9 Joe DiMaggio; 28 Myril Hoag; 1 Roy Johnson; 7 Jake Powell; 22 Bob Seeds; 3 George Selkirk; 27 Dixie Walker	Manager: -- Joe McCarthy; Coaches: 30 Earle Combs; 29 Art Fletcher; 31 Johnny Schulte

== Player stats ==
= Indicates team leader

= Indicates league leader

=== Batting ===
==== Starters by position ====
Note: Pos = Position; G = Games played; AB = At bats; H = Hits; Avg. = Batting average; HR = Home runs; RBI = Runs batted in

Pos	Player	G	AB	H	Avg.	HR	RBI
C	Bill Dickey	112	423	153	.362	22	107
1B	Lou Gehrig	155	579	205	.354	49	152
2B	Tony Lazzeri	150	537	154	.287	14	109
3B	Red Rolfe	135	568	181	.319	10	70
SS	Frankie Crosetti	151	632	182	.288	15	78
OF	Joe DiMaggio	138	637	206	.323	29	125
OF	George Selkirk	137	493	152	.307	18	107
OF	Jake Powell	87	328	99	.302	7	48

==== Other batters ====
Note: G = Games played; AB = At bats; H = Hits; Avg. = Batting average; HR = Home runs; RBI = Runs batted in

Player	G	AB	H	Avg.	HR	RBI
Myril Hoag	45	156	47	.301	3	34
Roy Johnson	63	147	39	.265	1	19
Ben Chapman	36	139	37	.266	1	21
Joe Glenn	44	129	35	.271	1	20
Jack Saltzgaver	34	90	19	.211	1	13
Art Jorgens	31	66	18	.273	0	5
Don Heffner	19	48	11	.229	0	6
Bob Seeds	13	42	11	.262	4	10
Dixie Walker	6	20	7	.350	1	5

=== Pitching ===
==== Starting pitchers ====
Note: G = Games pitched; IP = Innings pitched; W = Wins; L = Losses; ERA = Earned run average; SO = Strikeouts

Player	G	IP	W	L	ERA	SO
Red Ruffing	33	271.0	20	12	3.85	102
Monte Pearson	33	223.0	19	7	3.71	118
Johnny Broaca	37	206.0	12	7	4.24	84
Lefty Gomez	31	188.2	13	7	4.39	105

==== Other pitchers ====
Note: G = Games pitched; IP = Innings pitched; W = Wins; L = Losses; ERA = Earned run average; SO = Strikeouts

Player	G	IP	W	L	ERA	SO
Bump Hadley	31	173.2	14	4	4.35	74
Pat Malone	35	134.2	12	4	3.81	72
Johnny Murphy	27	88.0	9	3	3.38	34
Jumbo Brown	20	64.0	1	4	5.91	19

Note: Pat Malone was team leader in saves with 9.

==== Relief pitchers ====
Note: G = Games pitched; W = Wins; L = Losses; SV = Saves; ERA = Earned run average; SO = Strikeouts

Player	G	W	L	SV	ERA	SO
Ted Kleinhans	19	1	1	1	5.81	10
Kemp Wicker	7	1	2	0	7.65	5
Steve Sundra	1	0	0	0	0.00	1

== 1936 World Series ==
Game	Date	Visitor	Score	Home	Score	Record (NYY-NYG)	Attendance
1	September 30	New York Yankees	1	New York Giants	6	0–1	39,419
2	October 2	New York Yankees	18	New York Giants	4	1–1	43,543
3	October 3	New York Giants	1	New York Yankees	2	2–1	64,482
4	October 4	New York Giants	2	New York Yankees	5	3–1	66,669
5	October 5	New York Yankees	4	New York Giants	5	3–2	50,024
6	October 6	New York Yankees	13	New York Giants	5	4–2	38,427
New York Yankees win 4–2

== Farm system ==
Level	Team	League	Manager
AA	Kansas City Blues	American Association	Dutch Zwilling
AA	Newark Bears	International League	Ossie Vitt
AA	Oakland Oaks	Pacific Coast League	Billy Meyer
A	Binghamton Triplets	New York–Pennsylvania League	Bill Skiff
B	Norfolk Tars	Piedmont League	Johnny Neun
C	Akron Yankees	Middle Atlantic League	Nick Allen
C	Joplin Miners	Western Association	Benny Bengough
D	Rogers Lions	Arkansas–Missouri League	Doc Ledbetter / Bud Stapleton
D	Bassett Furniture Makers	Bi-State League	Lefty Jenkins

LEAGUE CHAMPIONS: Norfolk, Bassett
