= Les Tietje =

American baseball player (1910–1996)

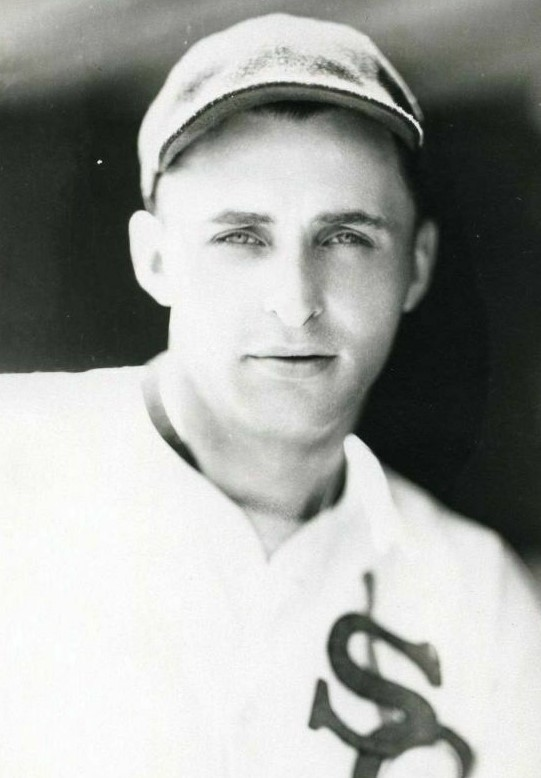
- Pitcher
- Born: September 11, 1910; Sumner, Iowa, U.S.
- Died: October 2, 1996 (aged 86); Rochester, Minnesota, U.S.
- Batted: Right Threw: Right

MLB debut
- September 18, 1933, for the Chicago White Sox

Last MLB appearance
- September 4, 1938, for the St. Louis Browns

MLB statistics
- Win–loss record: 22–41
- Earned run average: 5.11
- Strikeouts: 193
- Stats at Baseball Reference

Teams
- Chicago White Sox (1933–1936); St. Louis Browns (1936–1938)

Leslie William "Toots" Tietje (September 11, 1910 – October 2, 1996) was an American professional baseball pitcher with the Chicago White Sox and St. Louis Browns of Major League Baseball between 1933 and 1938. Tietje batted and threw right-handed. He was born in Sumner, Iowa.

He broke into professional baseball in 1931, pitching for the Waterloo Hawks and going 8–13 with a 5.03 ERA. He spent 1932 with Waterloo, going 8–14, and hitting .212 with four home runs. In 1933, he spent most of the season with the Dallas Steers, going 14–10 with a 3.51 ERA. He earned a call up to the big leagues, and on September 18 he made his debut. He started three games for the White Sox that year, going 2–0 with a 2.42 ERA. As he would throughout his entire career, he walked more batters than he struck out: in 22 1/3 innings, he walked 15 batters and struck out only nine.

According to John Carmichael, Tietje was on pace for a successful career, but he developed arthritis in his arm and was hampered by that for the rest of his career. In 1934, for example, he was only 5–14 with a 4.81 ERA. In 176 innings, he walked 96 batters and struck out only 81. His 4.14 strikeouts per nine innings were seventh best in the league that year, and the 20 home runs he gave up were the second most. His 14 losses were ninth most.

On April 12, 1935, Tietje was scheduled to start the first Chicago White Sox versus Chicago Cubs game ever held at Wrigley Field; he would have faced Lon Warneke. That game was rained out however. In the 1935 regular season, Tietje went 9–15 with a 4.30 ERA. He walked 81 batters and struck out 64. His 15 losses were third most in the league, and his six wild pitches were eighth most. He began the 1936 season with the White Sox, but after posting a 27.00 ERA in two games with them he was traded to the Browns for Sugar Cain. He made 14 appearances for the Browns, half of which he started, and went 3–5 with a 6.62 ERA for them. Overall, he went 3–5 with a 7.52 ERA, walking 35 batters and striking out only 19. He went 1–2 with a 4.20 ERA in 1937, walking 17 batters and striking out five. That season, he spent a large amount of time with the San Antonio Missions, going 14–7 with a 2.67 ERA. In 1938, his final season, he went 2–5 with a 7.55 ERA. He walked 38 batters and struck out 15.

Although he played his final big league game on September 4, 1938, he stuck around and played in the minors until 1942. Playing for the Missions in 1939, he went 14–8 with a 3.24 ERA. He went 5–7 with a 4.12 ERA for the Missions in 1940. Playing for the Waterloo Hawks in 1941, he went 9–8 with a 4.11 ERA. In 1942, his final season, he went 0–4.

Overall, Tietje went 22–41 with a 5.11 ERA in 105 games (65 starts). In 512 2/3 innings, he walked 282 batters and struck out 193. He hit .099 in 171 big league at-bats. Defensively, he recorded a .983 fielding percentage, committing only two errors in 117 total chances. In the minors, he went 67–64. Statistically, he is most similar to Mike Morrison, according to the Similarity Scores at Baseball-Reference.com.

At the time of his death Tietje lived in Kasson, Minnesota.

He was interred at Maple Grove Cemetery in Kasson.
