= Jo-Jo Morrissey =

American baseball player (1904–1950)

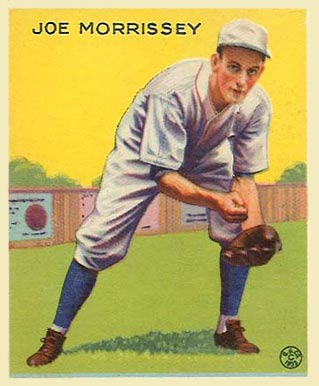
- Jo-Jo Morrissey 1933 Goudey baseball card
- Infielder
- Born: January 16, 1904; Warren, Rhode Island, U.S.
- Died: May 2, 1950 (aged 46); Worcester, Massachusetts, U.S.
- Batted: Right Threw: Right

MLB debut
- April 12, 1932, for the Cincinnati Reds

Last MLB appearance
- September 23, 1936, for the Chicago White Sox

MLB statistics
- Batting average: .232
- Home runs: 0
- Runs batted in: 45
- Stats at Baseball Reference

Teams
- Cincinnati Reds (1932–1933); Chicago White Sox (1936)

Joseph Anselm Morrissey (January 16, 1904 – May 2, 1950), nicknamed Jo-Jo, was an American professional baseball infielder who played three seasons in Major League Baseball for the Cincinnati Reds and the Chicago White Sox from 1932 to 1936.

== Minor league career ==
Morrissey was a graduate of College of the Holy Cross in Massachusetts. He began his professional career in 1926 with the Hartford Senators of the Eastern League, where he played in 44 games and had a batting average of .272 and three home runs. He split the 1927 season with the Scottdale Scotties of the Middle Atlantic League and Hartford. He hit .408 with the Scotties in 26 games while hitting .261 with Hartford.

Morrissey missed two years of baseball before reappearing with the Evansville, Indiana team in the Illinois–Indiana–Iowa League. With Evansville, his batting average was .321, and his teammates included future major leaguers Tommy Bridges, Pete Fox, Gee Walker, and Jo-Jo White, all of whom later played for the Detroit Tigers. Morrissey played for the St. Paul Saints of American Association in 1931. He played in 167 games, collecting 223 hits and setting a career-high in home runs with 22.

== Major league career ==
Morrissey was sold to the Cincinnati Reds prior to the 1932 season. He broke a finger during spring training in 1933. The Reading Eagle reported that Morrissey "developed amazingly". He was a starter during the 1933 season, playing in 148 games and batting .230. Also a poor fielder, he was fifth in the league with 40 errors committed. He was released after the 1933 season and played in 17 games with the White Sox as a backup in 1936. During a May 27 game against the Tigers, while replacing Jimmy Dykes at third base, he made an error that cost the game for the White Sox, when he allowed three runs to score. Morrissey died at the age of 46 at Worcester, Massachusetts.
