= 1936 Cleveland Indians season =

1936 Cleveland Indians
- League: American League
- Ballpark: League Park; Cleveland Municipal Stadium
- City: Cleveland, Ohio
- Owners: Alva Bradley
- General managers: Cy Slapnicka
- Managers: Steve O'Neill
- Radio: WHK (Jack Graney)

The 1936 Cleveland Indians season was a season in American baseball. The team finished fifth in the American League with a record of 80–74, 22½ games behind the New York Yankees.

== Regular season ==
=== Season standings ===
American League
Team	W	L	Pct.	GB	Home	Road
New York Yankees	102	51	.667	—	56‍–‍21	46‍–‍30
Detroit Tigers	83	71	.539	19½	44‍–‍33	39‍–‍38
Washington Senators	82	71	.536	20	42‍–‍35	40‍–‍36
Chicago White Sox	81	70	.536	20	43‍–‍32	38‍–‍38
Cleveland Indians	80	74	.519	22½	49‍–‍30	31‍–‍44
Boston Red Sox	74	80	.481	28½	47‍–‍29	27‍–‍51
St. Louis Browns	57	95	.375	44½	31‍–‍43	26‍–‍52
Philadelphia Athletics	53	100	.346	49	31‍–‍46	22‍–‍54

=== Record vs. opponents ===
1936 American League record Sources:
Team	BOS	CWS	CLE	DET	NYY	PHA	SLB	WSH
Boston	—	12–10	9–13	13–9	15–7–1	13–9	12–10	8–14
Chicago	10–12	—	12–10–1	8–14	7–14	15–7	13–8–1	16–5
Cleveland	13–9	10–12–1	—	9–13	6–16–1	13–9	15–7–1	14–8
Detroit	9–13	14–8	13–9	—	8–14	17–5	11–11	11–11
New York	15–7–1	14–7	16–6–1	14–8	—	16–6	14–8	13–9
Philadelphia	9–13	7–15	9–13	5–17	6–16	—	11–10–1	6–16
St. Louis	10–12	8–13–1	7–15–1	11–11	8–14	10–11–1	—	3–19
Washington	14–8	5–16	8–14	11–11	9–13	16–16	19–3	—

=== Roster ===
1936 Cleveland Indians
Roster
Pitchers: 15 Johnny Allen; 33,16 George Blaeholder; 21 Lloyd Brown; 9 Bob Feller; 36,25 Denny Galehouse; 18 Mel Harder; 19 Oral Hildebrand; 12 Willis Hudlin; 17 Paul Kardow; 22 Thornton Lee; 24,17 Al Milnar; 10 George Uhle; 23 Ralph Winegarner; 31 Bill Zuber	Catchers: 8 Joe Becker; 29,17 Greek George; 11 Frankie Pytlak; 14 Billy Sullivan; Infielders: 2 Boze Berger; 34 Odell Hale; 5 Roy Hughes; 4 Bill Knickerbocker; 7 Hal Trosky	Outfielders: 3 Earl Averill; 35 Bruce Campbell; 1 Milt Galatzer; 31 Jim Gleeson; 21 Jeff Heath; 6 Joe Vosmik; 23 Roy Weatherly	Manager: 30 Steve O'Neill; Coaches: 20 Wally Schang; 10 George Uhle

== Player stats ==
=== Batting ===
==== Starters by position ====
Note: Pos = Position; G = Games played; AB = At bats; H = Hits; Avg. = Batting average; HR = Home runs; RBI = Runs batted in

Pos	Player	G	AB	H	Avg.	HR	RBI
C	Billy Sullivan	93	319	112	.351	2	48
1B	Hal Trosky	151	629	216	.343	42	162
2B	Roy Hughes	152	638	188	.295	0	63
SS	Bill Knickerbocker	155	618	182	.294	8	73
3B	Odell Hale	153	620	196	.316	14	87
OF	Joe Vosmik	138	506	145	.287	7	94
OF	Roy Weatherly	84	349	117	.335	8	53
OF	Earl Averill	152	682	136	.378	28	126

==== Other batters ====
Note: G = Games played; AB = At bats; H = Hits; Avg. = Batting average; HR = Home runs; RBI = Runs batted in

Player	G	AB	H	Avg.	HR	RBI
Frankie Pytlak	75	224	72	.321	0	31
Bruce Campbell	76	172	64	.372	6	30
Jim Gleeson	41	139	36	.259	4	12
Milt Galatzer	49	97	23	.237	0	6
Greek George	23	77	15	.195	0	5
Boze Berger	28	52	9	.173	0	3
Joe Becker	22	50	9	.180	1	11
Jeff Heath	12	41	14	.341	1	8

=== Pitching ===
==== Starting pitchers ====
Note: G = Games pitched; IP = Innings pitched; W = Wins; L = Losses; ERA = Earned run average; SO = Strikeouts

Player	G	IP	W	L	ERA	SO
Johnny Allen	36	243.0	20	10	3.44	165
Mel Harder	36	224.2	15	15	5.17	84
Oral Hildebrand	36	174.2	10	11	4.90	65
Lloyd Brown	24	140.1	8	10	4.17	34

==== Other pitchers ====
Note: G = Games pitched; IP = Innings pitched; W = Wins; L = Losses; ERA = Earned run average; SO = Strikeouts

Player	G	IP	W	L	ERA	SO
Bob Feller	14	62.0	5	3	3.34	76
Al Milnar	4	22.0	1	2	7.36	9
Ralph Winegarner	9	14.2	0	0	4.91	3
Bill Zuber	2	13.2	1	1	6.59	5
George Uhle	7	12.2	0	1	8.53	5
Milt Galatzer	1	6.0	0	0	4.50	3
Paul Kardow	2	2.0	0	0	4.50	0

==== Relief pitchers ====
Note: G = Games pitched; W = Wins; L = Losses; SV = Saves; ERA = Earned run average; SO = Strikeouts

Player	G	W	L	SV	ERA	SO
Thornton Lee	43	3	5	3	4.89	49
Denny Galehouse	36	8	7	1	4.85	71
George Blaeholder	35	8	4	0	5.09	30
Willis Hudlin	27	1	5	0	9.00	20

== Awards and honors ==
All Star Game

Earl Averill, outfielder (starter)

Mel Harder, pitcher

== Farm system ==
Level	Team	League	Manager
A1	New Orleans Pelicans	Southern Association	Larry Gilbert
C	Zanesville Grays	Middle Atlantic League	Earl Wolgamot
D	Opelousas Indians	Evangeline League	Carlos Moore
D	Fargo-Moorhead Twins	Northern League	Hal Irelan
D	Monessen Indians	Pennsylvania State Association	John Hruska

LEAGUE CHAMPIONS: Zanesville
