= Bill Shores =

American baseball player (1904–1984)

- Pitcher
- Born: May 26, 1904; Abilene, Texas, U.S.
- Died: February 19, 1984 (aged 79); Purcell, Oklahoma, U.S.
- Batted: Right Threw: Right

MLB debut
- April 11, 1928, for the Philadelphia Athletics

Last MLB appearance
- September 20, 1936, for the Chicago White Sox

MLB statistics
- Win–loss record: 26–15
- Earned run average: 4.17
- Strikeouts: 129
- Stats at Baseball Reference

Teams
- Philadelphia Athletics (1928–1931); New York Giants (1933); Chicago White Sox (1936)

Career highlights and awards
- World Series champion (1930)

William David Shores (May 26, 1904 – February 19, 1984) was an American professional baseball pitcher. He played in Major League Baseball (MLB) from 1928 to 1936 for the Philadelphia Athletics, Chicago White Sox, and New York Giants.

Shores was the first major league player to wear uniform number 13, while playing for the A's in 1931. The number 13 was not routinely issued to players, except by request.
