= 1936 Detroit Tigers season =

Major League Baseball season

1936 Detroit Tigers
- League: American League
- Ballpark: Navin Field
- City: Detroit, Michigan
- Record: 83–71 (.539)
- League place: 2nd
- Owners: Walter Briggs, Sr.
- General managers: Mickey Cochrane
- Managers: Mickey Cochrane
- Radio: WWJ (AM) (Ty Tyson); WXYZ (Harry Heilmann)

The 1936 Detroit Tigers season was a season in American baseball. The team finished second in the American League with a record of 83–71, 19½ games behind the New York Yankees.

== Offseason ==
- December 10, 1935: Al Simmons was purchased by the Tigers from the Chicago White Sox for $75,000.

== Regular season ==
=== Season standings ===
American League
Team	W	L	Pct.	GB	Home	Road
New York Yankees	102	51	.667	—	56‍–‍21	46‍–‍30
Detroit Tigers	83	71	.539	19½	44‍–‍33	39‍–‍38
Washington Senators	82	71	.536	20	42‍–‍35	40‍–‍36
Chicago White Sox	81	70	.536	20	43‍–‍32	38‍–‍38
Cleveland Indians	80	74	.519	22½	49‍–‍30	31‍–‍44
Boston Red Sox	74	80	.481	28½	47‍–‍29	27‍–‍51
St. Louis Browns	57	95	.375	44½	31‍–‍43	26‍–‍52
Philadelphia Athletics	53	100	.346	49	31‍–‍46	22‍–‍54

=== Record vs. opponents ===
1936 American League record Sources:
Team	BOS	CWS	CLE	DET	NYY	PHA	SLB	WSH
Boston	—	12–10	9–13	13–9	15–7–1	13–9	12–10	8–14
Chicago	10–12	—	12–10–1	8–14	7–14	15–7	13–8–1	16–5
Cleveland	13–9	10–12–1	—	9–13	6–16–1	13–9	15–7–1	14–8
Detroit	9–13	14–8	13–9	—	8–14	17–5	11–11	11–11
New York	15–7–1	14–7	16–6–1	14–8	—	16–6	14–8	13–9
Philadelphia	9–13	7–15	9–13	5–17	6–16	—	11–10–1	6–16
St. Louis	10–12	8–13–1	7–15–1	11–11	8–14	10–11–1	—	3–19
Washington	14–8	5–16	8–14	11–11	9–13	16–16	19–3	—

=== Roster ===
1936 Detroit Tigers
Roster
Pitchers: 13 Elden Auker; 10 Tommy Bridges; 16 Alvin Crowder; 17 Elon Hogsett; 12 Chad Kimsey; 15 Roxie Lawson; 28 Red Phillips; 14 Schoolboy Rowe; 18 Vic Sorrell; 19 Joe Sullivan; 21 Jake Wade	Catchers: 3 Mickey Cochrane; 23 Ray Hayworth; 16 Glenn Myatt; 21 Frank Reiber; -- Birdie Tebbetts; Infielders: 22,29 Jack Burns; 24 Flea Clifton; 26 Gil English; 2 Charlie Gehringer; 5 Hank Greenberg; 8 Marv Owen; 24 Salty Parker; 7 Billy Rogell	Outfielders: 9 Pete Fox; 4 Goose Goslin; 6 Al Simmons; 6 Gee Walker; 25 Jo-Jo White	Manager: 3 Mickey Cochrane; Coaches: 32 Del Baker; 31 Cy Perkins

== Player stats ==
=== Batting ===
==== Starters by position ====
Note: Pos = Position; G = Games played; AB = At bats; H = Hits; Avg. = Batting average; HR = Home runs; RBI = Runs batted in

Pos	Player	G	AB	H	Avg.	HR	RBI
C	Ray Hayworth	81	250	60	.240	1	30
1B	Jack Burns	138	558	158	.283	4	63
2B	Charlie Gehringer	154	641	227	.354	15	116
SS	Billy Rogell	146	585	160	.274	6	68
3B	Marv Owen	154	583	172	.295	9	105
OF	Al Simmons	143	568	186	.327	13	112
OF	Gee Walker	134	550	194	.353	12	93
OF	Goose Goslin	147	572	180	.315	24	125

==== Other batters ====
Note: G = Games played; AB = At bats; H = Hits; Avg. = Batting average; HR = Home runs; RBI = Runs batted in

Player	G	AB	H	Avg.	HR	RBI
Pete Fox	73	220	67	.305	4	26
Mickey Cochrane	44	126	34	.270	2	17
Glenn Myatt	27	78	17	.218	0	5
Frank Reiber	20	55	15	.273	1	5
Jo-Jo White	58	51	14	.275	0	6
Hank Greenberg	12	46	16	.348	1	15
Birdie Tebbetts	10	33	10	.303	1	4
Flea Clifton	13	26	5	.192	0	1
Salty Parker	11	25	7	.280	0	4
Gil English	1	1	0	.000	0	0

=== Pitching ===
==== Starting pitchers ====
Note: G = Games pitched; IP = Innings pitched; W = Wins; L = Losses; ERA = Earned run average; SO = Strikeouts

Player	G	IP	W	L	ERA	SO
Tommy Bridges	39	294.2	23	11	3.60	175
Schoolboy Rowe	41	245.1	19	10	4.51	115
Elden Auker	35	215.1	13	16	4.89	66
Jake Wade	13	78.1	4	5	5.29	30
General Crowder	9	44.0	4	3	8.39	10

==== Other pitchers ====
Note: G = Games pitched; IP = Innings pitched; W = Wins; L = Losses; ERA = Earned run average; SO = Strikeouts

Player	G	IP	W	L	ERA	SO
Vic Sorrell	30	131.1	6	7	5.28	37
Roxie Lawson	41	128.0	8	6	5.48	34
Red Phillips	22	87.1	2	4	6.49	15

==== Relief pitchers ====
Note: G = Games pitched; W = Wins; L = Losses; SV = Saves; ERA = Earned run average; SO = Strikeouts

Player	G	W	L	SV	ERA	SO
Joe Sullivan	26	2	5	1	6.78	32
Chad Kimsey	22	2	3	3	4.85	11
Elon Hogsett	3	0	1	0	9.00	1

== Awards and honors ==
=== League records ===
- Charlie Gehringer, American League record, most doubles in one season by a second baseman (60)

== Farm system ==
Level	Team	League	Manager
AA	Milwaukee Brewers	American Association	Allen Sothoron
A1	Beaumont Exporters	Texas League	Dutch Lorbeer
B	Augusta Tigers	Sally League	Dixie Parker, Pee-Wee Wanninger and Herb Thomas
C	Jackson Senators	Cotton States League	Guy Lacy
C	Charleston Senators	Middle Atlantic League	Ig Walters
D	Fieldale Towlers	Bi-State League	Joe Guyon and Red Smith
D	Alexandria Aces	Evangeline League	Art Phelan
D	Wausau Lumberjacks	Northern League	Lute Boone
D	Tiffin Mud Hens	Ohio State League	Myles Thomas
D	Charleroi Tigers	Pennsylvania State Association	Joe Klinger and John McIlvaine

LEAGUE CHAMPIONS: Milwaukee, Alexandria, Tiffin
