= Ollie Bejma =

American baseball player (1907–1995)

- Infielder
- Born: September 12, 1907; South Bend, Indiana, U.S.
- Died: January 3, 1995 (aged 87); South Bend, Indiana, U.S.
- Batted: Right Threw: Right

MLB debut
- April 24, 1934, for the St. Louis Browns

Last MLB appearance
- October 1, 1939, for the Chicago White Sox

MLB statistics
- Batting average: .245
- Home runs: 14
- Runs batted in: 117
- Stats at Baseball Reference

Teams
- St. Louis Browns (1934–1936); Chicago White Sox (1939)

Aloysius Frank Bejma (BAY-ma; September 12, 1907 – January 3, 1995) was an American professional baseball infielder in Major League Baseball with the Chicago White Sox and the St. Louis Browns between 1934 and 1939.

== Baseball career ==
Born in South Bend, Indiana, Bejma quit school at 16 and eventually wound up working for Studebaker and playing for five years on the company's baseball team. He made his pro baseball debut in 1929 with the Indianapolis Indians of the American Association, just one step below the majors; the 21-year-old batted .287 as a back-up outfielder. He spent most of 1930 with the Class B Quincy Indians (despite the names, neither club was affiliated with the MLB Cleveland Indians) where he hit .344 and switched to second base. After another year in Quincy and two more in the Texas League, Bejma made his major league debut on April 24, 1934, for the Browns in a 15–2 loss to Cleveland. Used as a utility infielder for the remainder of the season, Bejma hit .271 in 95 games (both career highs) and played four positions (shortstop, second base, third base, and outfield).

Bejma (nicknamed "The Polish Falcon") spent the next two seasons with the Browns in a somewhat less frequent reserve role, filling in at every infield position but first base. Bejma made no major league appearances in the 1937 or 1938 seasons, spending the latter in the minor league system of the Chicago White Sox, who had purchased him from the Browns in March 1938. He made his White Sox debut with in 1939 and had 307 at-bats, the most he had in any MLB season. He also surprisingly tallied eight home runs, despite having hit only six in 599 previous major league at-bats; this contributed to his MLB career best of 44 runs batted in.

Bejma's last big-league game was on October 1, 1939, a 4–3 loss to his old team, the Browns. That winter, he was traded by the White Sox with Johnny Gerlach to the Cleveland Indians in exchange for Skeeter Webb. Though Webb played for another nine seasons in the majors, Bejma (nor Gerlach) ever played in MLB again. Bejma played another two seasons in St. Paul, a season out west with the San Francisco Seals, and finally wrapped up his career in Buffalo in 1943. Back in South Bend, Bejma returned to work for Studebaker and played semi-pro ball. He also excelled at a different sport: bowling, where he was part of five-man state championship team in 1954.

Ollie Bejma died on January 3, 1995, at the age of 87.

== Peanuts ==
Bejma was a childhood idol of cartoonist Charles Schulz, and Schulz immortalized the ballplayer in a Peanuts comic strip on February 21, 1974. Snoopy asks his bird friend Woodstock who was the starting shortstop for the pennant-winning 1938 St. Paul Saints, and Woodstock says it was Ollie Bejma. This is in fact incorrect; the Saints' shortstop that year was Tony York (who later briefly played with the Cubs during World War II) while Bejma played second base. Still, the South Bend native was instrumental in leading St. Paul to the pennant, batting .326 and winning the American Association Most Valuable Player Award.
