= Joe Bokina =

American baseball player (1910-1991)

- Pitcher
- Born: April 4, 1910; Northampton, Massachusetts, U.S.
- Died: October 25, 1991 (aged 81); Chattanooga, Tennessee, U.S.
- Batted: Right Threw: Right

MLB debut
- April 16, 1936, for the Washington Senators

Last MLB appearance
- May 9, 1936, for the Washington Senators

MLB statistics
- Win–loss record: 0–2
- Earned run average: 8.64
- Strikeouts: 5
- Stats at Baseball Reference

Teams
- Washington Senators (1936)

Joseph Bokina (April 4, 1910 – October 25, 1991) was an American Major League Baseball pitcher who played with the Washington Senators in 1936.
