= Mike Meola =

American baseball player (1905–1976)

- Pitcher
- Born: October 19, 1905; New York City, U.S.
- Died: September 1, 1976 (aged 70); Fair Lawn, New Jersey, U.S.
- Batted: Right Threw: Right

MLB debut
- April 24, 1933, for the Boston Red Sox

Last MLB appearance
- September 16, 1936, for the Boston Red Sox

MLB statistics
- Win–loss record: 0-3
- Earned run average: 8.16
- Strikeouts: 25
- Stats at Baseball Reference

Teams
- Boston Red Sox (1933, 1936); St. Louis Browns (1936)

Emile Michael Meola (October 19, 1905 – September 1, 1976) was an American pitcher in Major League Baseball who played between the 1933 and 1936 seasons. Listed at 5 ft 11 in (1.80 m), 175 lb., Meola batted and threw right-handed. He was born in New York City.

== Career ==
Meola started his baseball career in 1928 with the Chambersburg Maroons of the Class D Blue Ridge League. He pitched six years in the minor leagues before joining the Boston Red Sox in 1933.

In 1934, Meola enjoyed one of the best seasons ever for a pitcher in minor league history, after going 20–5 with a 2.90 ERA for the Los Angeles Angels of the Pacific Coast League. The next year he finished with a 19–8 mark. He divided his playing time between the St. Louis Browns and Boston Red Sox in 1936, his last major league season.

== Records ==
In a three-year majors career, Meola posted a 0–3 record with 15 strikeouts and an 8.16 ERA in 18 appearances, including three starts, one complete game, one save, and 43.0 innings of work. He also spent more than a decade in the minors, pitching for the Charlotte, Jersey City, Toronto and Syracuse teams, among others. Following his baseball retirement in 1939, he worked as a demolition contractor in New York.

== Death ==
A resident of Fair Lawn, New Jersey, Meola died there at age 70.

== Sources ==
- 1934 Los Angeles Angels
- Baseball Reference
- Deadball Era
- Retrosheet
