= Tony Giuliani =

American baseball player

- Catcher
- Born: November 24, 1912; Saint Paul, Minnesota, U.S.
- Died: October 8, 2004 (aged 91); Saint Paul, Minnesota, U.S.
- Batted: Right Threw: Right

MLB debut
- April 18, 1936, for the St. Louis Browns

Last MLB appearance
- October 3, 1943, for the Washington Senators

MLB statistics
- Batting average: .233
- Home runs: 0
- RBI: 69
- Stats at Baseball Reference

Teams
- St. Louis Browns (1936–1937); Washington Senators (1938–1939, 1943); Brooklyn Dodgers (1940–1941)

Angelo John "Tony" Giuliani (November 24, 1912 – October 8, 2004) was an American catcher in Major League Baseball in 1936–41 and 1943. Born in St. Paul, Minnesota, he attended Saint Thomas Military Academy and has been selected to its Athletic Hall of Fame. He also attended the University of Saint Thomas and the Catholic University of America.

Giuliani threw and batted right-handed; he stood 5 feet 11 inches (1.80 m) tall and weighed 175 pounds (79 kg). His pro career, curtailed by injury, extended for 12 seasons (1932–43) with a one-game appearance in 1949 as a member of the Triple-A Minneapolis Millers.

During his 243-game MLB career, Giuliani collected 157 hits, with 18 doubles and three triples his only blows for extra bases.

After his playing career, he became a longtime scout. He died in Saint Paul at age 91.
