= Jack Russell (baseball) =

American baseball player (1905–1990)

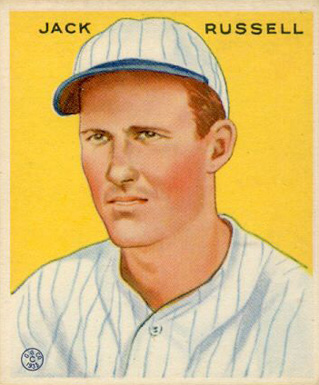
- Pitcher
- Born: October 24, 1905; Paris, Texas, U.S.
- Died: November 3, 1990 (aged 85); Clearwater, Florida, U.S.
- Batted: Right Threw: Right

MLB debut
- May 5, 1926, for the Boston Red Sox

Last MLB appearance
- August 7, 1940, for the St. Louis Cardinals

MLB statistics
- Win–loss record: 85–141
- Earned run average: 4.46
- Strikeouts: 418
- Stats at Baseball Reference

Teams
- Boston Red Sox (1926–1932); Cleveland Indians (1932); Washington Senators (1933–1936); Boston Red Sox (1936); Detroit Tigers (1937); Chicago Cubs (1938–1939); St. Louis Cardinals (1940)

Career highlights and awards
- All-Star (1934)

Jack Erwin Russell (October 24, 1905 – November 3, 1990) was a Major League Baseball player from 1926 to 1940 for the Boston Red Sox, Chicago Cubs, Cleveland Indians, Washington Senators, Detroit Tigers and St. Louis Cardinals. Russell was mainly a pitcher and his career marks were 85 wins, 141 losses, and a 4.46 ERA. After his baseball career ended, Russell settled in Clearwater, Florida, and was instrumental in raising money to build a baseball stadium, Jack Russell Memorial Stadium, which became the spring training home of the Philadelphia Phillies beginning in 1955 and continuing through 2003, when the team moved to Bright House Networks Field, also in Clearwater.

Russell died November 3, 1990, in Clearwater, Florida.

== See also ==
- List of Major League Baseball annual saves leaders
