= Johnny Welch =

American baseball player (1906–1940)

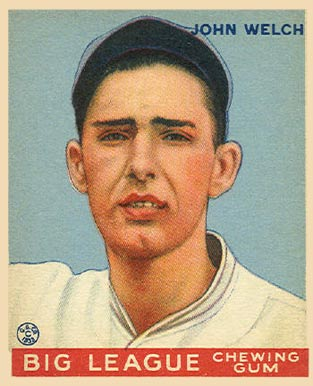
- Pitcher
- Born: December 2, 1906; Washington, D.C., U.S.
- Died: September 2, 1940 (aged 33); St. Louis, Missouri, U.S.
- Batted: Left Threw: Right

MLB debut
- May 22, 1926, for the Chicago Cubs

Last MLB appearance
- August 26, 1936, for the Pittsburgh Pirates

MLB statistics
- Win–loss record: 35–41
- Earned run average: 4.66
- Strikeouts: 257
- Stats at Baseball Reference

Teams
- Chicago Cubs (1926–1928, 1931); Boston Red Sox (1932–1936); Pittsburgh Pirates (1936)

Johnny Welch (December 2, 1906 – September 2, 1940) was a pitcher in Major League Baseball. He played in the major leagues for nine years. Welch died from tuberculosis at age 33 and is buried at Calvary Cemetery in St. Louis, Missouri.

== Career ==
From 1926-1931, Welch played for the Chicago Cubs. He pitched in 14 games total for the Cubs.

From 1932-1936, he played for the Boston Red Sox. He hit his first home run during his first season with them. He pitched in 142 games for four years.

In late 1936, Welch was traded to the Pittsburgh Pirates. He pitched in nine games with them before retiring.

As a hitter, Welch was better than average for a pitcher, posting a career .219 batting average (50-for-228) with 27 runs, 1 home run and 20 RBI in 175 games. He recorded a .975 fielding percentage, which was 19 points higher than the league average at his position.
