= Marshall Renfroe =

American baseball player (1936-1970)

- Pitcher
- Born: May 25, 1936; Century, Florida, U.S.
- Died: December 10, 1970 (aged 34); Pensacola, Florida, U.S.
- Batted: Left Threw: Left

MLB debut
- September 27, 1959, for the San Francisco Giants

Last MLB appearance
- September 27, 1959, for the San Francisco Giants

MLB statistics
- Win–loss record: 0–0
- Earned run average: 27.00
- Strikeouts: 3
- Innings pitched: 2
- Stats at Baseball Reference

Teams
- San Francisco Giants (1959)

Marshall Daniel Renfroe (May 25, 1936 – December 10, 1970) was an American professional baseball player. He was a left-handed pitcher who spent nine seasons (1954–62) in minor league baseball, and saw one game of service in the Major Leagues with the 1959 San Francisco Giants. Born in Century, Florida, he was listed at 6 feet (1.8 m) tall and 180 pounds (82 kg).

Renfroe was recalled by the Giants in September 1959 after posting an 8–8 record with a 3.54 earned run average with the Triple-A Phoenix Giants of the Pacific Coast League. On September 27, the last weekend of the 1959 campaign, he was given the starting assignment against the St. Louis Cardinals at Busch Stadium. Staked to a 2–0 lead in the top of the first inning, Renfroe allowed a solo home run to Stan Musial in the bottom of the frame. He escaped without further damage and retired the Redbirds in order in the second inning. But in the third, with the Giants now ahead 4–1, Renfroe failed to retire a batter, allowing three bases on balls, a two-run double to Joe Cunningham, and an RBI single to Wally Shannon. Relieved by right-hander Al Worthington, Renfroe left the game with none out, two runners on base, and the score tied at four. Those runners eventually scored, giving the Cardinals the lead, 6–4. In his two full innings pitched, Renfroe allowed three hits and six earned runs, with three walks and three strikeouts. The Giants came back later in the game to briefly lead 7–6, but ultimately fell 14–8 with Eddie Fisher taking the loss.

Renfroe then returned to the minors in 1960, and apart from a spring training spent with the 1962 Washington Senators, never returned to the big leagues. He died at age 34 in a car accident in Pensacola, Florida.
