= Harry Kimberlin =

American baseball player (1909-1999)

- Pitcher
- Born: March 13, 1909; Sullivan, Missouri, U.S.
- Died: December 31, 1999 (aged 90); Poplar Bluff, Missouri, U.S.
- Batted: Right Threw: Right

MLB debut
- July 11, 1936, for the St. Louis Browns

Last MLB appearance
- June 24, 1939, for the St. Louis Browns

MLB statistics
- Win–loss record: 1–4
- Earned run average: 4.70
- Strikeouts: 21
- Stats at Baseball Reference

Teams
- St. Louis Browns (1936–1939)

Harry Lydle Kimberlin (March 13, 1909 – December 31, 1999) was an American pitcher in Major League Baseball. He played for the St. Louis Browns.
