= Joe Cascarella =

American baseball player (1907–2002)

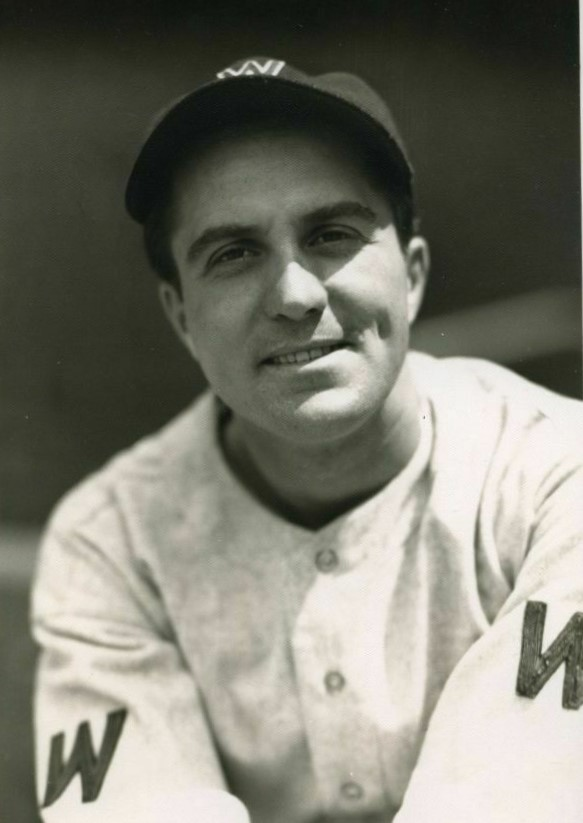
- Pitcher
- Born: June 28, 1907; Philadelphia, Pennsylvania, U.S.
- Died: May 22, 2002 (aged 94); Baltimore, Maryland, U.S.
- Batted: Right Threw: Right

MLB debut
- April 17, 1934, for the Philadelphia Athletics

Last MLB appearance
- September 28, 1938, for the Cincinnati Reds

MLB statistics
- Win–loss record: 27–48
- Earned run average: 4.84
- Strikeouts: 192
- Stats at Baseball Reference

Teams
- Philadelphia Athletics (1934–1935); Boston Red Sox (1935–1936); Washington Senators (1936–1937); Cincinnati Reds (1937–1938)

Joseph Thomas Cascarella (June 28, 1907 – May 22, 2002) was an American pitcher in Major League Baseball who played with four different teams between 1934 and 1938. Listed at 5 ft 10.5 in (1.79 m), 175 lb (79 kg), Cascarella batted and threw right-handed. He was born in Philadelphia.

Cascarella filled various pitching roles, as a starter, or coming out from the bullpen as a middle-reliever or a closer. He reached the majors in 1934 with the Philadelphia Athletics, spending one and a half year with them before moving to the Boston Red Sox (1935–1936), Washington Senators (1936–1937), and Cincinnati Reds (1937–1938). In his rookie year he collected a career-high 12 wins, including seven in relief to lead the American League. He also was selected to an All-Star team which toured Japan after the season, but he never won more than nine games during a regular season.

In a five-season career, Cascarella posted a 27–48 record with 192 strikeouts and a 4.84 ERA in 143 appearances, including 54 starts, 20 complete games, three shutouts, 58 games finished, eight saves, and 540 1/3 innings pitched.

Known as "Crooning Joe" for his fine tenor voice, Cascarella later became a popular singer on radio shows and in night clubs. He also worked as operational vice president of Laurel Race Track.

Cascarella died in Baltimore, Maryland at age 94. At the time of his death, Cascarella was the last surviving member of the 1934 “All Americans” exhibition team, assembled by Connie Mack of American League player that toured Asia-Pacific in 1934. Cascarella was joined by Connie Mack, Babe Ruth, Jimmy Foxx, Lou Gehrig, Lefty Gomez, Charlie Gehringer, Earl Averill, Bing Miller, Moe Berg, Earl Whitehill, Frank Hayes, Eric McNair, and Clint Brown.

== See also ==
- Boston Red Sox all-time roster
