= Al Barks =

American baseball player (1936–2018)

- First baseman
- Born: June 30, 1936; Norfolk, Virginia, U.S.
- Died: August 25, 2018 (aged 82); Georgia, U.S.
- Batted: Right Threw: Right

Negro league baseball debut
- 1957, for the New York Black Yankees

Last appearance
- 1957, for the New York Black Yankees

Teams
- New York Black Yankees (1957)

Alfred Barks (June 30, 1936 – August 25, 2018) was an American baseball first baseman who played for the New York Black Yankees in 1957.

== Career ==
Barks attended St. Joseph High School in Norfolk, Virginia. He then went on the play for the New York Black Yankees in 1957. He died in Georgia on August 25, 2018, at the age of 82.
