= William Betts (umpire) =

American baseball umpire (1865-1936)

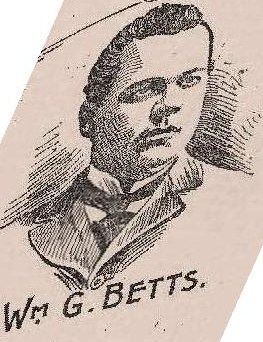
- Born: William G. Betz; 1865; Washington, D.C., U.S.
- Died: September 9, 1936 (aged 70–71); Washington, D.C., U.S.
- Occupation: Umpire
- Years active: 1894-1903
- Employer(s): National League, American League

William G. Betts ([?] 1865 – September 9, 1936) was an American Major League Baseball umpire. He was born William G. Betz.

Betts officiated 121 National League games from 1894 to 1899. He led the league in ejections with five in 1896. He then umpired in the American League in the 1901 and 1903 seasons. A machinist, Betts designed a new umpire indicator for National League umpires prior to the 1895 season. In 1896, he became the first umpire to use a small wisk broom to clean home plate during games. In between his stints in the National and American leagues, Betts worked Virginia League and the Atlantic League.
