= Bill Niles =

American baseball player (1867–1936)

- Third baseman
- Born: January 11, 1867; Covington, Kentucky, U.S.
- Died: July 3, 1936 (aged 69); Springfield, Ohio, U.S.
- Batted: Unknown Threw: Unknown

MLB debut
- May 13, 1895, for the Pittsburgh Pirates

Last MLB appearance
- August 5, 1895, for the Pittsburgh Pirates

MLB statistics
- Batting average: .216
- Hits: 8
- Stolen bases: 2
- Stats at Baseball Reference

Teams
- Pittsburgh Pirates (1895)

William E. Niles (January 11, 1867 – July 3, 1936) was an American Major League Baseball player. Niles played for Pittsburgh Pirates in the 1895 season. He played just eleven games in his career, having eight hits in 37 at-bats, a .216 batting average.

Niles was born in Covington, Kentucky, and died in Springfield, Ohio.
