= Jake Powell =

American baseball player (1908–1948)

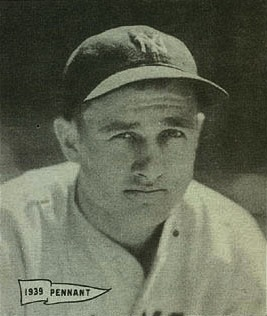
- Powell in 1940
- Outfielder
- Born: July 15, 1908; Silver Spring, Maryland, U.S.
- Died: November 4, 1948 (aged 40); Washington, D.C., U.S.
- Batted: Right Threw: Right

MLB debut
- August 3, 1930, for the Washington Senators

Last MLB appearance
- September 30, 1945, for the Philadelphia Phillies

MLB statistics
- Batting average: .271
- Home runs: 22
- Runs batted in: 327
- Stats at Baseball Reference

Teams
- Washington Senators (1930, 1934–1936); New York Yankees (1936–1940); Washington Senators (1943–1945); Philadelphia Phillies (1945)

Career highlights and awards
- 3× World Series champion (1936–1938)

Alvin Jacob Powell (July 15, 1908 – November 4, 1948) was an American outfielder for the Washington Senators (1930, 1934–1936 and 1943–1945), New York Yankees (1936–1940) and Philadelphia Phillies (1945).

== Career ==
Powell helped the Yankees win the World Series every year from 1936 to 1939 and batted .455 in the 1936 series. In eleven seasons, he played in 688 games and had 2,540 at bats, 353 runs, 689 hits, 116 doubles, 26 triples, 22 home runs, 327 RBIs, 65 stolen bases, 173 walks, a .271 batting average, .320 on-base percentage, .363 slugging percentage, 923 total bases and 43 sacrifice hits. Defensively, he recorded a .975 fielding percentage.

He played in 31 games in 1939. On April 10, 1940, the Yankees were working their way north after spring training in Florida and stopped in Ashland, KY, to play an exhibition game. Powell was pursuing a fly ball when he crashed into an iron light pole and suffered a head injury, most likely a concussion and possibly a fractured skull.

Powell was sidelined until July 15 and was limited to playing in 12 games for the 1940 Yankees.

Powell spent the next two seasons (1941–1942) in the minors before he returned to the big leagues with the Senators in 1943. In the fall of 1944 – during World War II – Powell served as an emergency police officer in Montgomery County, Maryland.

In July 1945, the Senators sent Powell to the Phillies. He had a hit and a RBI in each game of a doubleheader against the Cardinals on Sept. 16, 1945, at St. Louis. He was retired in 1946. In 1948, Powell tried to make a comeback, playing in 31 games for the Gainesville G-Men of the Florida State League, but batted just .220.

== Controversy ==
Throughout his career, Powell had been involved in a number of controversies on and off the field. In the sixth inning of the April 29, 1936 game between the Senators and the Detroit Tigers, the avowedly anti-semitic Powell intentionally collided with Jewish star Hank Greenberg, breaking Greenberg's wrist and costing the first baseman his season after only 12 games. While playing for the 1936 World Series team, he received a $5,000 check, which he later gambled away. He also stole various items out of hotel rooms during his baseball days. During a dugout interview in a July 1938 game versus the Chicago White Sox at Comiskey Park, Powell was asked by WGN radio announcer Bob Elson how he stayed in shape during the off-season. Powell – who claimed to be a policeman in his hometown of Dayton, Ohio (but in reality had only applied without being hired) – replied that he kept in shape by "cracking niggers over the head with my blackjack." He was subsequently suspended for 10 days by Commissioner Kenesaw Mountain Landis, for making "an uncomplimentary reference to a portion of the population." He was later ordered by the Yankees to walk through Harlem as an act of apology, accompanied by noted Black aviator Hubert Julian.

On November 4, 1948, Powell was arrested in Washington D.C. for passing a bad $25 check. Powell, who had a history of passing bad checks in other states, was on the way to New York City with his partner, Josephine Amber, to find a judge that would marry him after every judge in the area rejected him. Amber told Powell that she had a judge in New York City that could get the job done, but stated that the judge was not available. Powell had been looking at getting married while simultaneously married to his first wife, Elizabeth. Powell had cashed $300 in checks and another one for $25 while paying his hotel bill. The desk clerk at the hotel called the bank in Dayton, Ohio on the check and was notified that Powell did not have an account. The assistant hotel manager followed Powell and Amber to Union Station, where they intended to catch a train. The manager called the police, who arrested Powell at the stadium. Amber followed them to the police headquarters.

Powell called a friend at the Montgomery County police and recommended that he come home to Ohio and straighten out. Amber was asked to talk to the police in a nearby office. She informed police that they should frisk Powell for any weapons. At that moment, Powell pounced on his gun and fired two shots into his head, killing him instantly. The police inspector stated that the two detectives who were interviewing Powell and Amber were not going to be disciplined for allowing the suicide because they were not expected to know that Powell would be carrying a gun over a $25 bad check.
