= Sugar Cain =

American baseball player (1907–1975)

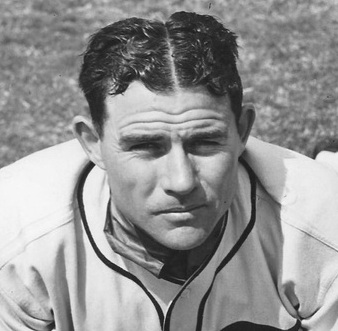
- Cain, circa 1937
- Pitcher
- Born: April 5, 1907; Macon, Georgia, U.S.
- Died: April 3, 1975 (aged 67); Atlanta, Georgia, U.S.
- Batted: Left Threw: Right

MLB debut
- April 15, 1932, for the Philadelphia Athletics

Last MLB appearance
- May 28, 1938, for the Chicago White Sox

MLB statistics
- Win–loss record: 53–60
- Earned run average: 4.83
- Strikeouts: 279
- Stats at Baseball Reference

Teams
- Philadelphia Athletics (1932–1935); St. Louis Browns (1935–1936); Chicago White Sox (1936–1938)

Merritt Patrick "Sugar" Cain (April 5, 1907 – April 3, 1975) was an American professional baseball pitcher who worked in 178 games in the major leagues as a member of the Philadelphia Athletics (1932–1935), St. Louis Browns (1935–1936) and Chicago White Sox (1936–1938). The native of Macon, Georgia, batted left-handed and threw right-handed, stood 5 feet 11 inches (1.80 m) tall and weighed 190 pounds (86 kg).

Over three-quarters of Cain's MLB appearances came as a starting pitcher, and during his career, he amassed 58 complete games and two shutouts. Although his won–lost record was only 53–60 (.469) with an earned run average of 4.83, he posted seasons of 13 (1933) and 15 (1936) wins. However, Cain exhibited poor control of his repertoire, allowing more than 100 bases on balls for three straight seasons (1933–1935), leading the American League in walks issued (123) in 1935, and averaging 5.2 walks per nine innings pitched over his big-league career. Altogether, in 9871/3 innings, Cain allowed 1,119 hits and 569 bases on balls, with 279 strikeouts.

His pitching career ended in the minor leagues in 1943, although he returned to the game to manage the Vidalia-Lyons Twins in the Class D Georgia State League for part of the 1948 campaign. He died in Atlanta on April 3, 1975.
