= Ed Linke =

American baseball player (1911-1988)

- Pitcher
- Born: November 9, 1911; Chicago, Illinois, U.S.
- Died: June 21, 1988 (aged 76); Chicago, Illinois, U.S.
- Batted: Right Threw: Right

MLB debut
- April 27, 1933, for the Washington Senators

Last MLB appearance
- September 4, 1938, for the St. Louis Browns

MLB statistics
- Win–loss record: 22–22
- Earned run average: 5.61
- Strikeouts: 156
- Stats at Baseball Reference

Teams
- Washington Senators (1933–1937); St. Louis Browns (1938)

Edward Karl Linke (November 9, 1911 – June 21, 1988) was a Major League Baseball pitcher. He played all or part of six seasons in the majors, from 1933 until 1938, for the Washington Senators and St. Louis Browns.

Linke was a good hitting pitcher, posting a .263 batting average (41-for-156) with 26 runs, 2 home runs, 17 RBI and 19 bases on balls in 122 games.
