= 1936 Major League Baseball season =

1936 MLB season
- League: American League (AL); National League (NL)
- Sport: Baseball
- Duration: Regular season: April 14 – September 27, 1936; World Series: September 30 – October 6, 1936
- Games: 154
- Teams: 16 (8 per league)

Regular season
- Season MVP: AL: Lou Gehrig (NYY); NL: Carl Hubbell (NYG)
- AL champions: New York Yankees
- AL runners-up: Detroit Tigers
- NL champions: New York Giants
- NL runners-up: St. Louis Cardinals & Chicago Cubs

World Series
- Champions: New York Yankees
- Runners-up: New York Giants

MLB seasons
- ← 1935 1937 →

Locations of teams for the 1934–1939 American League seasons
American League
Locations of teams for the 1936–1937 National League seasons
National League

The 1936 major league baseball season began on April 14, 1936. The regular season ended on September 27, with the New York Giants and New York Yankees as the regular season champions of the National League and American League, respectively. The postseason began with Game 1 of the 33rd World Series on September 30 and ended with Game 6 on October 6. In the fourth iteration of this World Series matchup, the Yankees defeated the Giants, four games to two, capturing their fifth championship in franchise history, since their previous in 1932, and their first in a four-World Series run. Going into the season, the defending World Series champions were the Detroit Tigers from the 1935 season.

The fourth All-Star Game was held on July 7 at National League Park in Boston, Massachusetts, home of the Boston Bees. The National League had their first All-Star victory, winning 4–3.

The Boston Braves changed their nickname to "Bees" this season; they would revert to the Braves in 1941.

== Schedule ==
The 1936 schedule consisted of 154 games for all teams in the American League and National League, each of which had eight teams. Each team was scheduled to play 22 games against the other seven teams of their respective league. This continued the format put in place since the 1904 season (except for 1919) and would be used until 1961 in the American League and 1962 in the National League.

Opening Day, April 14, featured all sixteen teams, the first since the 1934 season. The final day of the regular season was on September 27 and featured fourteen teams (the Chicago White Sox and St. Louis Browns finished their season the day before). This was the first season which didn't feature all sixteen teams since the 1929 season. The World Series took place between September 30 and October 6.

== Rule changes ==
The 1936 season saw the following rule changes:

- The American League banned night games, as well as the installation of lights.
- Players were not allowed to barnstorm until 10 days after the close of the season.

== Teams ==
An asterisk (*) denotes the ballpark a team played the minority of their home games at

League	Team	City	Ballpark	Capacity	Manager
American League	Boston Red Sox	Boston, Massachusetts	Fenway Park	33,817	Joe Cronin
American League	Chicago White Sox	Chicago, Illinois	Comiskey Park	52,000	Jimmy Dykes
American League	Cleveland Indians	Cleveland, Ohio	League Park	22,500	Steve O'Neill
American League	Cleveland Indians	Cleveland, Ohio	Cleveland Stadium*	78,811*	Steve O'Neill
American League	Detroit Tigers	Detroit, Michigan	Navin Field	30,000	Mickey Cochrane
American League	Detroit Tigers	Detroit, Michigan	Navin Field	30,000	Del Baker
American League	New York Yankees	New York, New York	Yankee Stadium	62,000	Joe McCarthy
American League	Philadelphia Athletics	Philadelphia, Pennsylvania	Shibe Park	33,000	Connie Mack
American League	St. Louis Browns	St. Louis, Missouri	Sportsman's Park	34,023	Rogers Hornsby
American League	Washington Senators	Washington, D.C.	Griffith Stadium	32,000	Bucky Harris
National League	Boston Bees	Boston, Massachusetts	National League Park	46,500	Bill McKechnie
National League	Brooklyn Dodgers	New York, New York	Ebbets Field	32,000	Casey Stengel
National League	Chicago Cubs	Chicago, Illinois	Wrigley Field	40,000	Charlie Grimm
National League	Cincinnati Reds	Cincinnati, Ohio	Crosley Field	26,060	Chuck Dressen
National League	New York Giants	New York, New York	Polo Grounds	56,000	Bill Terry
National League	Philadelphia Phillies	Philadelphia, Pennsylvania	Baker Bowl	18,800	Jimmie Wilson
National League	Pittsburgh Pirates	Pittsburgh, Pennsylvania	Forbes Field	41,000	Pie Traynor
National League	St. Louis Cardinals	St. Louis, Missouri	Sportsman's Park	34,023	Frankie Frisch

== Standings ==
=== American League ===
American League
Team	W	L	Pct.	GB	Home	Road
New York Yankees	102	51	.667	—	56‍–‍21	46‍–‍30
Detroit Tigers	83	71	.539	19½	44‍–‍33	39‍–‍38
Washington Senators	82	71	.536	20	42‍–‍35	40‍–‍36
Chicago White Sox	81	70	.536	20	43‍–‍32	38‍–‍38
Cleveland Indians	80	74	.519	22½	49‍–‍30	31‍–‍44
Boston Red Sox	74	80	.481	28½	47‍–‍29	27‍–‍51
St. Louis Browns	57	95	.375	44½	31‍–‍43	26‍–‍52
Philadelphia Athletics	53	100	.346	49	31‍–‍46	22‍–‍54

=== National League ===
National League
Team	W	L	Pct.	GB	Home	Road
New York Giants	92	62	.597	—	52‍–‍26	40‍–‍36
St. Louis Cardinals	87	67	.565	5	43‍–‍33	44‍–‍34
Chicago Cubs	87	67	.565	5	50‍–‍27	37‍–‍40
Pittsburgh Pirates	84	70	.545	8	46‍–‍30	38‍–‍40
Cincinnati Reds	74	80	.481	18	42‍–‍34	32‍–‍46
Boston Bees	71	83	.461	21	35‍–‍43	36‍–‍40
Brooklyn Dodgers	67	87	.435	25	37‍–‍40	30‍–‍47
Philadelphia Phillies	54	100	.351	38	30‍–‍48	24‍–‍52

=== Tie games ===
10 tie games (6 in AL, 4 in NL), which are not factored into winning percentage or games behind (and were often replayed again) occurred throughout the season.

==== American League ====
- Boston Red Sox, 1
- Chicago White Sox, 2
- Cleveland Indians, 3
- New York Yankees, 2
- Philadelphia Athletics, 1
- St. Louis Browns, 3

==== National League ====
- Boston Bees, 3
- Brooklyn Dodgers, 2
- Pittsburgh Pirates, 2
- St. Louis Cardinals, 1

== Postseason ==
The postseason began on September 30 and ended on October 6 with the New York Yankees defeating the New York Giants in the 1936 World Series in six games.

=== Bracket ===
World Series
AL	New York Yankees	4
NL	New York Giants	2

== Managers ==
=== In-season ===
Team	Former Manager	New Manager
Detroit Tigers	Mickey Cochrane	Del Baker

== League leaders ==
=== American League ===
Hitting leaders
Stat	Player	Total
AVG	Luke Appling (CWS)	.388
OPS	Lou Gehrig (NYY)	1.174
HR	Lou Gehrig (NYY)	49
RBI	Hal Trosky (CLE)	162
R	Lou Gehrig (NYY)	167
H	Earl Averill (CLE)	232
SB	Lyn Lary (SLB)	37

Pitching leaders
Stat	Player	Total
W	Tommy Bridges (DET)	23
L	Gordon Rhodes (PHA)	20
ERA	Lefty Grove (BOS)	2.81
K	Tommy Bridges (DET)	175
IP	Wes Ferrell (BOS)	301.0
SV	Pat Malone (NYY)	9
WHIP	Lefty Grove (BOS)	1.192

=== National League ===
Hitting leaders
Stat	Player	Total
AVG	Paul Waner (PIT)	.373
OPS	Mel Ott (NYG)	1.036
HR	Mel Ott (NYG)	33
RBI	Joe Medwick (STL)	138
R	Arky Vaughan (PIT)	122
H	Joe Medwick (STL)	223
SB	Pepper Martin (STL)	23

Pitching leaders
Stat	Player	Total
W	Carl Hubbell (NYG)	26
L	Bucky Walters (PHI)	21
ERA	Carl Hubbell (NYG)	2.31
K	Van Lingle Mungo (BRO)	238
IP	Dizzy Dean (STL)	315.0
SV	Dizzy Dean (STL)	11
WHIP	Carl Hubbell (NYG)	1.059

== Milestones ==
=== Batters ===
==== Four home runs in one game ====
- Chuck Klein (PHI/CHC):
  - Became the fourth player and second in franchise history to hit four home runs in one game as a part of the Philadelphia Phillies in a 9–6 win against the Pittsburgh Pirates on July 10.

==== Cycles ====
- Sam Leslie (NYG):
  - Leslie hit for his first cycle and 11th in franchise history, on May 24 against the Philadelphia Phillies.

==== Other batting accomplishments ====
- Tony Lazzeri (NYY):
  - Set a Major League record for most grand slams in a single game, hitting two grand slams in a 25–2 win against the Philadelphia Athletics on May 24.
  - Became the third player to hit at least 10 runs batted in (RBI) in a single game, hitting 11 against the Philadelphia Athletics on May 24.
- Lou Gehrig (NYY):
  - Became the second player in Major League history to hit 400 home runs in the first inning against the Cleveland Indians on July 10.

=== Miscellaneous ===
- New York Yankees:
  - Set a Major League record for the most runs batted in during a season, with 995.

== Awards and honors ==
=== Regular season ===
Baseball Writers' Association of America Awards
BBWAA Award	National League	American League
Most Valuable Player	Carl Hubbell (NYG)	Lou Gehrig (NYY)

=== Other awards ===
The Sporting News Awards
Award	National League	American League
Most Valuable Player	Carl Hubbell (NYG)	Lou Gehrig (NYY)
Player of the Year	Carl Hubbell (NYG)	—
Manager of the Year	—	Joe McCarthy (NYY)
Executive of the Year	Branch Rickey (STL)	—

=== Baseball Hall of Fame ===
- Ty Cobb
- Babe Ruth
- Honus Wagner
- Christy Mathewson
- Walter Johnson

== Home field attendance ==
Team name	Wins	%±	Home attendance	%±	Per game
New York Yankees	102	14.6%	976,913	48.6%	12,687
Detroit Tigers	83	−10.8%	875,948	−15.4%	11,376
New York Giants	92	1.1%	837,952	11.9%	10,743
Chicago Cubs	87	−13.0%	699,370	1.0%	9,083
Boston Red Sox	74	−5.1%	626,895	12.2%	8,141
Cleveland Indians	80	−2.4%	500,391	25.8%	6,178
Brooklyn Dodgers	67	−4.3%	489,618	4.1%	6,198
Cincinnati Reds	74	8.8%	466,345	4.0%	6,136
St. Louis Cardinals	87	−9.4%	448,078	−11.5%	5,819
Chicago White Sox	81	9.5%	440,810	−6.3%	5,877
Washington Senators	82	22.4%	379,525	48.8%	4,929
Pittsburgh Pirates	84	−2.3%	372,524	5.6%	4,902
Boston Bees	71	86.8%	340,585	46.3%	4,311
Philadelphia Athletics	53	−8.6%	285,173	22.3%	3,704
Philadelphia Phillies	54	−15.6%	249,219	21.3%	3,195
St. Louis Browns	57	−12.3%	93,267	15.3%	1,211

== Venues ==
Over 81 home games, the Cleveland Indians played 80 games at League Park and 1 game at Cleveland Stadium, on Sunday, August 2, against the New York Yankees. This would be the 2nd of 12 seasons since 1932 that saw the Indians play at both venues.

With the renaming of the Boston Braves to the Boston Bees, Braves Field is renamed National League Park, nicknamed by fans as The Bee Hive.

== See also ==
- 1936 in baseball (Events, Births, Deaths)
