= 1912 in baseball =

The following are the baseball events of the year 1912 throughout the world.

== Champions ==
- World Series: Boston Red Sox over New York Giants (4–3–1)

== Awards and honors ==
- Chalmers Award
  - Tris Speaker, Boston Red Sox, OF
  - Larry Doyle, New York Giants, 2B

== Statistical leaders ==
	American League		National League	
Stat	Player	Total	Player	Total
AVG	Ty Cobb (DET)	.409	Heinie Zimmerman^{1} (CHC)	.372
HR	Home Run Baker (PHA); Tris Speaker (BOS)	10	Heinie Zimmerman^{1} (CHC)	14
RBI	Home Run Baker (PHA)	130	Heinie Zimmerman^{1} (CHC)	104
W	Smoky Joe Wood (BOS)	34	Larry Cheney (CHC); Rube Marquard (NYG)	26
ERA	Walter Johnson (WSH)	1.39	Jeff Tesreau (NYG)	1.96
K	Walter Johnson (WSH)	303	Grover Alexander (PHI)	195

^{1} National League Triple Crown batting winner

== Major league baseball final standings ==
=== American League final standings ===
American League
Team	W	L	Pct.	GB	Home	Road
Boston Red Sox	105	47	.691	—	57‍–‍20	48‍–‍27
Washington Senators	91	61	.599	14	45‍–‍32	46‍–‍29
Philadelphia Athletics	90	62	.592	15	45‍–‍31	45‍–‍31
Chicago White Sox	78	76	.506	28	34‍–‍43	44‍–‍33
Cleveland Naps	75	78	.490	30½	41‍–‍35	34‍–‍43
Detroit Tigers	69	84	.451	36½	37‍–‍39	32‍–‍45
St. Louis Browns	53	101	.344	53	27‍–‍50	26‍–‍51
New York Highlanders	50	102	.329	55	31‍–‍44	19‍–‍58

Locations of teams for the 1912 American League season
American League

=== National League final standings ===
National League
Team	W	L	Pct.	GB	Home	Road
New York Giants	103	48	.682	—	49‍–‍25	54‍–‍23
Pittsburgh Pirates	93	58	.616	10	44‍–‍31	49‍–‍27
Chicago Cubs	91	59	.607	11½	46‍–‍30	45‍–‍29
Cincinnati Reds	75	78	.490	29	45‍–‍32	30‍–‍46
Philadelphia Phillies	73	79	.480	30½	34‍–‍41	39‍–‍38
St. Louis Cardinals	63	90	.412	41	37‍–‍40	26‍–‍50
Brooklyn Trolley Dodgers	58	95	.379	46	33‍–‍43	25‍–‍52
Boston Braves	52	101	.340	52	31‍–‍47	21‍–‍54

Locations of teams for the 1912 National League season
National League

== Events ==
- Three clubs opened brand-new ballparks in this season.
  - Boston Red Sox : Fenway Park
  - Cincinnati Reds : Redland Field, which later became Crosley Field
  - Detroit Tigers : Navin Field, which was renamed Briggs Stadium and later Tiger Stadium
  - Fenway Park is the only one still standing.
- In response to the demand for an alternative way to statistically rate pitchers, the National League elected to officially score the Earned Run Average for the first time. New York Giants pitcher Jeff Tesreau went on to lead the new category with a 1.96 ERA.

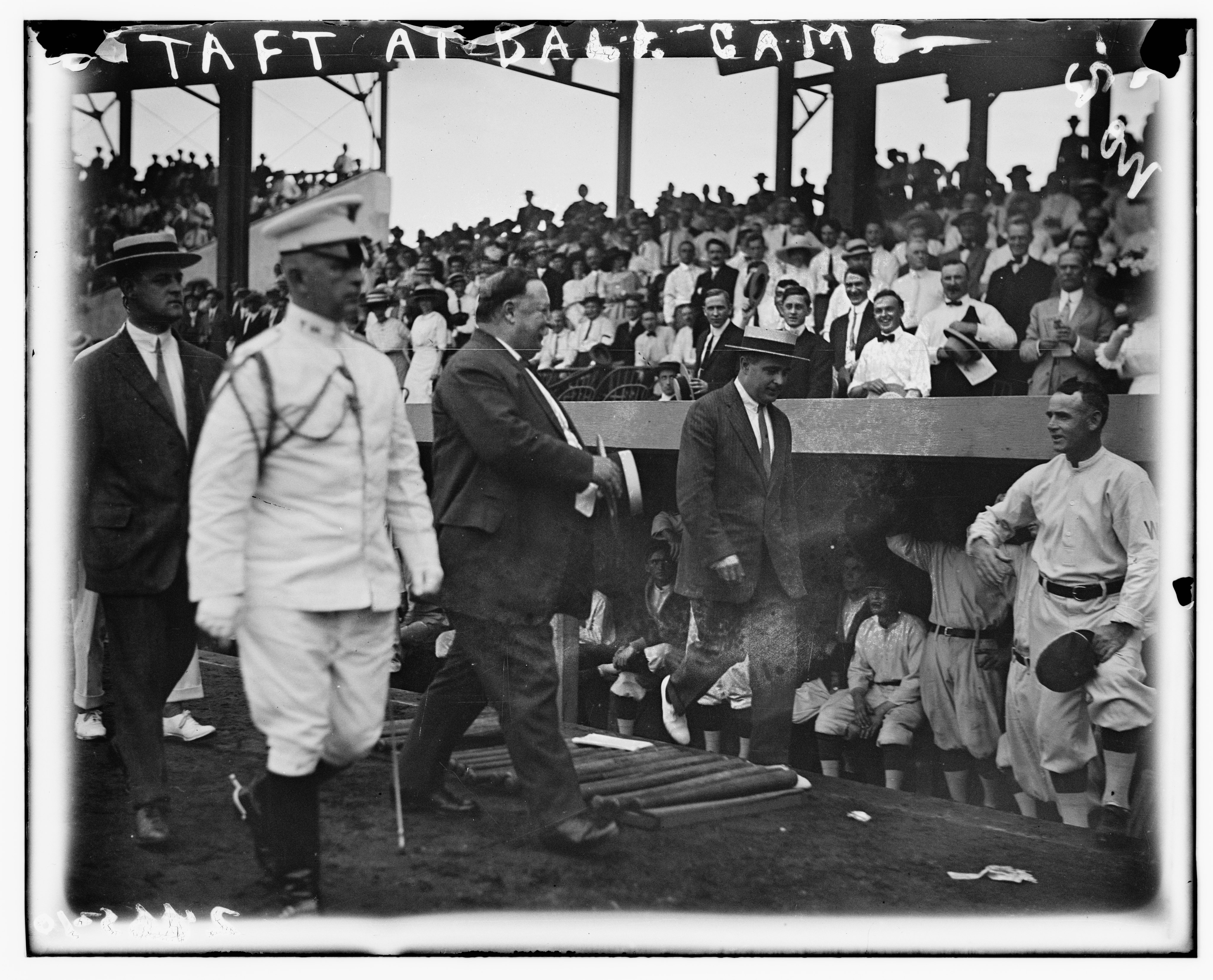
U.S. president Taft at a Washington-Chicago game, August 13

=== January ===
- January 2 – Brooklyn Superbas president and architect Charles Ebbets announces the purchase of 4.5 acres to build a 23,000-seat concrete and steel stadium in the Flatbush Pigeon section of Brooklyn, New York. As a result, construction on the ballpark will start on March 4th. In addition, Ebbets decides to name the ballpark after himself, thus it is called Ebbets Field. Completed in just over a year, Opening Day will be on April 9, 1913.

=== February ===
- February 12 – In a transaction of outfielders, the Boston Braves send Mike Donlin to the Pittsburgh Pirates in exchange for Vin Campbell. After one season at Pittsburgh, Donlin will be waived to the Philadelphia Phillies but will refuse to report and elect to retire.

=== March ===
- March 9 – Arky Vaughan is born in Clifty, Arkansas. Vaughan, a hard-hitting shortstop, will make his major league debut in 1932 and will go on to hit for a .318 batting average during a 14-year career with the Pittsburgh Pirates and the Brooklyn Dodgers, while appearing in nine All-Star Games and winning a National League batting title in 1935. In 1985, Vaughan will be elected to the Hall of Fame.

=== April ===
- April 9 – In the first game ever played at Fenway Park, the Boston Red Sox defeat the Harvard University team in an exhibition game played in a snow storm.
- April 10 - The Boston Braves purchase the contract of third baseman/First baseman Art Devlin from the New York Giants.
- April 11 :
  - The New York Highlanders, predecessors of the New York Yankees, wear pinstripes uniforms for the first time while facing the Boston Red Sox in Opening Day at Hilltop Park. In the first inning, Boston scores a run against pitcher Ray Caldwell‚ while New York respond with two runs in the bottom against Smoky Joe Wood. That is all the scoring until the ninth inning‚ when the Sox score four runs‚ including two on a Wood single. Boston wins‚ 5–3‚ on Wood's seven hitter.
  - New York Giants pitcher Rube Marquard begins a 19-game winning streak with an 18–3 triumph over the Brooklyn Dodgers.
- April 21 – The New York Giants and the New York Highlanders met at the Polo Grounds to play an unscheduled charity game to raise money for the survivors of the RMS Titanic, which had sunk six days earlier. The Giants prevailed, 11–2.
- April 20 – The Boston Red Sox play their first home game in the history of Fenway Park, which was built at a cost of $350,000. The Red Sox open up with an 11-inning, 7–6 victory over the New York Highlanders. Boston outfielder Tris Speaker delivers the game-winning RBI before a crowd of 27,000 fans. Minutes later, the Detroit Tigers christen their Navin Field with a 6–5 victory over the Cleveland Naps.
- April 26 – Hugh Bradley of the Boston Red Sox became the first player to hit a home run over the Green Monster at Fenway Park. It was his only home run of the 1912 season, and one of only two he hit in his five-season career.

=== May ===
- May 17 – Fenway Park is officially dedicated, almost one month after hosting its first game, as the Boston Red Sox host the Chicago White Sox playing in front of an overflow crowd. Nevertheless, the home town fans had their day spoiled as the White Sox trimmed the Red Sox, 5–2.
- May 18 – The Cincinnati Reds play the first game in the history of Crosley Field.
  - Members of the Detroit Tigers protest the suspension of Ty Cobb, and vow not to play the Philadelphia A's. Manager Hughie Jennings is forced to recruit local college and semi-pro players to play in order not to forfeit the game. The A's win 24–2, with pitcher Allan Travers surrendering all 24 runs. It would mark Travers only appearance in a major league game.
- May 30 - The Pittsburgh Pirates acquired pitcher King Cole and outfielder Solly Hofman from the Chicago Cubs in exchange for pitcher Lefty Leifield and outfielder Tommy Leach.
- May 31 – The St. Louis Cardinals ended the 14-game winning streak of the New York Giants after a 5–1 effort. The Giants incredible start of 43–11 remained the best of the century and stood unmatched until 1939, when the New York Yankees tied the mark.

=== June ===
- June 6 - The Philadelphia Phillies signed free agent pitcher Eppa Rixey. Rixey would go on to play 21 years for the Phillies and Cincinnati Reds combined without playing a single game in the minor leagues.
- June 9 – Boston Red Sox outfielder Tris Speaker hits for the cycle, leading his team to a 9–2 victory over the St. Louis Browns.
- June 10 – New York Giants catcher Chief Meyers hits for the cycle against the Chicago Cubs. Chicago wins, however, 9–8.
- June 28 – Christy Mathewson of the New York Giants becomes the eighth pitcher to record 300 career wins.

=== July ===
- July 2 – At Hilltop Park, Larry Gardner of the Boston Red Sox hit two inside-the-park home runs but Boston still lose to the New York Highlanders, 9–7.
- July 4 – In the second game of a double-header, George Mullin of the Detroit Tigers tosses a no-hitter against the St. Louis Browns in a 7–0 Tigers win. Also, the Brooklyn Dodgers defeat the New York Giants 10–4, snapping the Giants' sixteen game winning streak.
- July 25 – Bert Daniels, outfielder for the New York Highlanders, hits for the cycle is a 6– 4 loss to the Chicago White Sox.

=== August ===
- August 15 – Guy Zinn, a little-known New York Highlanders outfielder, steals home twice in a 5–4 win over the Detroit Tigers at Navin Field. This will add to last-place New York's major-league record of 18 steals of home for a single season.
- August 22 – Pittsburgh Pirates shortstop Honus Wagner hits for the cycle against the New York Giants.
- August 30 :
  - The Boston Red Sox run their record to 87–37 with a 2–1 win over the Philadelphia Athletics. Following the game, Athletics' manager Connie Mack says he never realized how strong the Red Sox were, and concedes the pennant to them. There are 30 games left for the Boston club, who will finish with a 105–47 record, 14 games over the Washington Senators and 15 over Philadelphia.
  - St. Louis Browns pitcher Earl Hamilton returns the favor to the Detroit Tigers, as he tosses a no-hitter in a 7–1 Browns victory.
- September 17 – Brooklyn Dodgers outfielder Casey Stengel makes an impressive major league debut against the Pittsburgh Pirates, collecting four hits with two RBI and two stolen bases in the Dodgers 7–3 win.

=== September ===
- September 14 – Former major league catcher and manager and current president of the Connecticut League, Jim O'Rourke, catches a complete game for the New Haven Blues club at age 60. O'Rourke, who spent 32 seasons in the majors from 1872 to 1904, would be elected to the Baseball Hall of Fame and Museum in 1945.

=== October ===
- October 12 - The Chicago Cubs released pitcher Mordecai Brown, AKA "Three Finger Brown".
- October 16 – The Boston Red Sox defeat the New York Giants, 3–2, in Game 8 of the World Series, ending one of the most exciting Series in Major League history. The Red Sox win the World Championship four games to three, with Game 2 being declared a tie. Nearly all of the contests were close, as four games in this series were decided by one run, a fifth ended in a tie, and a sixth was decided by two runs. Game 7 was the only one with a margin greater than three runs. Two games, including the decisive Game 8, went to extra innings. In Games 1 and 3, the losing team had the tying and winning runs on base when the game ended. This was the first time in which a World Series was decided by a walk-off in the final game. It was also the first Series where a team within one inning of losing the series came back to win. The next time a team that close to elimination recovered to win was in Game 6 of the 1986 Series.

=== December ===
- December 24 - The Philadelphia Phillies claimed outfielder Mike Donlin off waivers from the Pittsburgh Pirates.

== Births ==
=== January ===
- January 1 – Hiker Moran
- January 3 – Cliff Melton
- January 4 – Joe Mack
- January 6 – Hal Warnock
- January 31 – Jerry McQuaig

=== February ===
- February 12 – Linc Blakely
- February 12 – Dutch Dietz
- February 16 – Ray Harrell
- February 17 – Bruce Ogrodowski
- February 19 – Dick Siebert
- February 20 – Whitey Wistert
- February 28 – Mark Filley

=== March ===
- March 2 – Bennie Warren
- March 3 – Aubrey Epps
- March 5 – Dick Errickson
- March 5 – Jim Gleeson
- March 8 – Ray Mueller
- March 9 – Arky Vaughan
- March 16 – Bud Bates
- March 16 – Ed Edelen
- March 17 – Whitey Ock
- March 20 – Clyde Shoun
- March 24 – Jud McLaughlin

=== April ===
- April 1 – Jake Wade
- April 9 – Joe Royal
- April 12 – Jack Wilson
- April 13 – Jake Mooty
- April 22 – Pete Center
- April 30 – Chet Laabs

=== May ===
- May 3 – Paul Gehrman
- May 4 – Sid Gautreaux
- May 11 – Del Young
- May 17 – Ace Parker
- May 21 – Monty Stratton
- May 23 – Augie Galan
- May 27 – Terry Moore
- May 31 – Dutch Fehring

=== June ===
- June 8 – Lew Krausse
- June 10 – Whitey Moore
- June 11 – Dan Topping
- June 15 – Babe Dahlgren
- June 15 – Mem Lovett
- June 19 – Red Anderson
- June 19 – Don Gutteridge
- June 23 – Gene Ford
- June 30 – Dino Chiozza
- June 30 – Johnny Hudson
- June 30 – Manny Salvo

=== July ===
- July 8 – Salty Parker
- July 14 – Ed Lagger
- July 15 – Joe Rogalski
- July 16 – Milt Bocek
- July 19 – Ben Geraghty
- July 20 – Heinie Mueller
- July 21 – Billy Holm
- July 24 – Alex Carrasquel
- July 30 – Carl Doyle
- July 30 – Johnny Rizzo
- July 30 – Charlie Uhlir
- July 31 – Jesse Landrum
- July 31 – Archie Wise

=== August ===
- August 3 – Whitey Wilshere
- August 4 – Henry Coppola
- August 4 – Bill Schuster
- August 6 – Bud Hafey
- August 7 – Tom Drake
- August 9 – Lefty Sunkel
- August 12 – Harlond Clift
- August 14 – Paul Dean
- August 19 – Les Rock
- August 21 – Woody Williams
- August 24 – Frank Secory
- August 25 – George Cisar
- August 27 – Ted Olson
- August 28 – Luis Aparicio, Sr.
- August 28 – Goody Rosen

=== September ===
- September 1 – Ham Schulte
- September 1 – Claude Wilborn
- September 4 – Gordon Maltzberger
- September 4 – Fred Walters
- September 6 – Vince DiMaggio
- September 8 – Frank Oceak
- September 9 – Johnny Lazor
- September 14 – Icehouse Wilson
- September 16 – Emil Bildilli
- September 19 – Red Barkley
- September 20 – Tony DePhillips
- September 20 – Al McLean
- September 26 – Grey Clarke
- September 29 – Glen Stewart

=== October ===
- October 1 – Bob Griffith
- October 7 – Bill Patton
- October 9 – Mickey Haefner
- October 11 – Mike Guerra
- October 11 – Wayne Osborne
- October 12 – Ed Moriarty
- October 12 – Al Unser
- October 13 – Xavier Rescigno
- October 15 – Nick Tremark
- October 18 – Guy Curtright

=== November ===
- November 5 – Buck Rogers
- November 10 – Birdie Tebbetts
- November 11 – Hal Trosky
- November 11 – Al Wright
- November 13 – Alex Kampouris
- November 13 – Jackie Price
- November 15 – Kit Carson
- November 18 – Charlie Fuchs
- November 19 – Steve Gerkin
- November 19 – Stu Martin
- November 22 – Ted Cieslak
- November 24 – Tony Giuliani
- November 27 – Tony York

=== December ===
- December 1 – Cookie Lavagetto
- December 3 – Charlie Wagner
- December 20 – Tommy Irwin
- December 23 – Pat Ankenman
- December 24 – Dave Coble
- December 25 – Greek George
- December 25 – Quincy Trouppe
- December 27 – Jim Tobin
- December 28 – Otto Denning

== Deaths ==
=== January ===
- January 11 – Lefty Marr, 49, outfielder/third baseman who hit .289 in 363 games for the Cincinnati Red Stockings, Columbus Solons, and Cincinnati Kelly's Killers from 1886 to 1891.
- January 18 – John Russ, 53, outfielder/pitcher for the 1882 Baltimore Orioles of the American Association.
- January 31 – Ed Taylor, 34, pitcher for the 1903 St. Louis Cardinals.

=== February ===
- February 1 – Jim Doyle, 30, third baseman who hit .278 in two seasons with the Cincinnati Reds (1910) and Chicago Cubs (1911).
- February 11 – Jimmy Knowles, 55, Canadian infielder who .241 in 357 games with six different teams in two leagues between 1884 and 1892.

=== March ===
- March 6 – Pembroke Finlayson, 23, who pitched from 1908 through 1909 for the Brooklyn Superbas of the National League.
- March 9 – Doc Amole, 33, National League pitcher for the Baltimore Orioles (1897) and Washington Senators (1898).
- March 22 – Ed Kenna, 34, pitcher for the 1902 Philadelphia Athletics of the American League.
- March 25 – Harry Keener, 40, pitcher who posted a 3–11 record and a 5.88 ERA for the 1896 Philadelphia Phillies.

=== April ===
- April 17 – Ace Stewart, 43, second baseman for the 1895 Chicago Colts of the National League.
- April 18 – Hank Gehring, 31, pitcher who posted a 3–7 record and a 3.91 ERA for the Washington Senators from 1907 to 1908.
- April 20 – Sam Barkley, 53, American Association second baseman who played from 1884 through 1889 for the Toledo Blue Stockings, St. Louis Browns, Pittsburgh Alleghenys and Kansas City Cowboys.
- April 28 – Josh Bunce, 64, left fielder for the 1877 Brooklyn Hartfords of the National League.

=== May ===
- May 7 – Gus Alberts, 51, third baseman/shortstop for the Blues/Brewers/Nationals/Alleghenys from 1884 to 1891.

=== June ===
- June 11 – Leonidas Lee, 51, outfielder for the 1877 St. Louis Brown Stockings of the National League.
- June 29 – Harry Lyons, 46, outfielder who hit .234 and stole 120 bases in four different leagues with the Giants, Broncos, Browns and Quakers between 1887 and 1893.

=== August ===
- August 6 – Dick Van Zant, 47, third baseman for the 1888 Cleveland Blues of the American Association.
- August 10 – Ed Sales, 51, for the 1890 Pittsburgh Alleghenys of the National League.
- August 15 – Lou Polchow, 32, pitcher for the 1902 Cleveland Bronchos of the American League.
- August 21 – Thomas C. Noyes, 44, newspaper publisher who was part-owner of the Washington Senators from 1904 until his death.

=== September ===
- September 5 – Tug Arundel, 50, catcher who played with four teams in two leagues from 1882 to 1888.
- September 7 – Bugs Raymond, 30, pitcher who posted a 45–57 record and a 2.49 ERA in 136 games for the Tigers, Cardinals and Giants between 1904 and 1911.
- September 15 – Al Barker, 73, who pitched one game for 1871 Rockford Forest Citys of the National Association.
- September 26 – Cherokee Fisher, 67, star pitcher before and after the official beginning of professional baseball, known for his blazing fastball, who led the National Association in 1872 with a .909 W–L% and a 1.80 ERA.

=== October ===
- October 1 – Bill Boyd, 59, National Association IF/OF/P and manager between the 1872 and 1875 seasons.
- October 4 – George Knight, 56, pitcher for the 1875 New Haven Elm Citys of the National Association.
- October 6 – Bill Finley, 49, National League catcher/outfielder for the 1886 New York Giants.
- October 8 – Heinie Heitmuller, 29, outfielder who played from 1909 to 1910 for the Philadelphia Athletics.
- October 10 – Bill Tobin, 58, National League third baseman for the Troy Trojans and Worcester Ruby Legs during the 1880 season.
- October 20 – John Skopec, 32, American League pitcher for the Chicago White Sox (1901) and Detroit Tigers (1903).
- October 21 – Charlie Waitt, 59, outfielder/first baseman for the Orioles/Browns/White Stockings/Quakers from 1875 to 1883.
- October 24 – Piggy Ward, 45, OF/IF who hit .286 with 172 runs and 90 RBI in 221 games with the Senators/Orioles/Reds/Quakers/Pirates from 1883 to 1894.

=== November ===
- November 1 – Ed Green, 52, pitcher/infielder for the 1890 Philadelphia Athletics of the American Association.
- November 4 – Frank Murphy, 36, National League OF/IF who hit a combined .219 average in 80 games for the Boston Beaneaters and New York Giants in 1901.
- November 8 – Cupid Childs, 45, second baseman for the Spiders/Orphans/Stars/Perfectos/Quakers from 1888 to 1901, a .306 career hitter with 1214 hits, who topped the American Association in doubles (1890) and the National League in runs (1892), while ranking third all-time in walks (991) upon retirement.
- November 11 – John Rainey, 48, OF/IF for the New York Giants of the National League (1887) and the Buffalo Bisons of the Players' League (1890).
- November 15 – Dennis O'Neill, 45, first baseman for the 1893 St. Louis Browns of the National League.
- November 26 – John T. Brush, 67, owner of the New York Giants from 1902 until the time of his death, who also owned the Indianapolis Hoosiers in the late 1880s and the Cincinnati Reds from 1891 to 1902.
- November 27 – Fred Corey, 57[?], 3B/P/OF who posted a 27–46 record and hit a .246 average for the Providence Grays, Worcester Ruby Legs and Philadelphia Athletics between 1878 and 1885.

=== December ===
- December 12 – Jim Green, 58, third baseman for the 1884 Washington Nationals of the Union Association.
- December 21 – Jim Conway, 54, American Association pitcher who posted a 22–29 record and a 3.64 ERA in 56 games with the Brooklyn Atlantics (1884), Philadelphia Athletics (1885) and Kansas City Cowboys (1889).
- December 21 – Jim Gilman, 42, third baseman the 1893 Cleveland Spiders of the National League.
- December 22 – Ed Kennedy, 51, third baseman for the Cincinnati Outlaw Reds of the Union Association in 1884.
- December 31 – Charlie Sprague, 48, pitcher who went 10–7 with a 4.51 ERA in three seasons with the Chicago White Stockings (1887), Cleveland Spiders (1889) and Toledo Maumees (1890).
