= 1934 Washington Senators season =

1934 Washington Senators
- League: American League
- Ballpark: Griffith Stadium
- City: Washington, D.C.
- Record: 66–86 (.434)
- League place: 7th
- Owners: Clark Griffith and William Richardson
- Managers: Joe Cronin
- Radio: WJSV (Arch McDonald)

The 1934 Washington Senators played 154 games, won 66, lost 86, and finished in seventh place in the American League. They were managed by Joe Cronin and played home games at Griffith Stadium. In the eighth inning of their game against the Boston Red Sox on June 9, the Washington Senators hit 5 consecutive doubles – the most ever hit consecutively during the same inning.

== Regular season ==
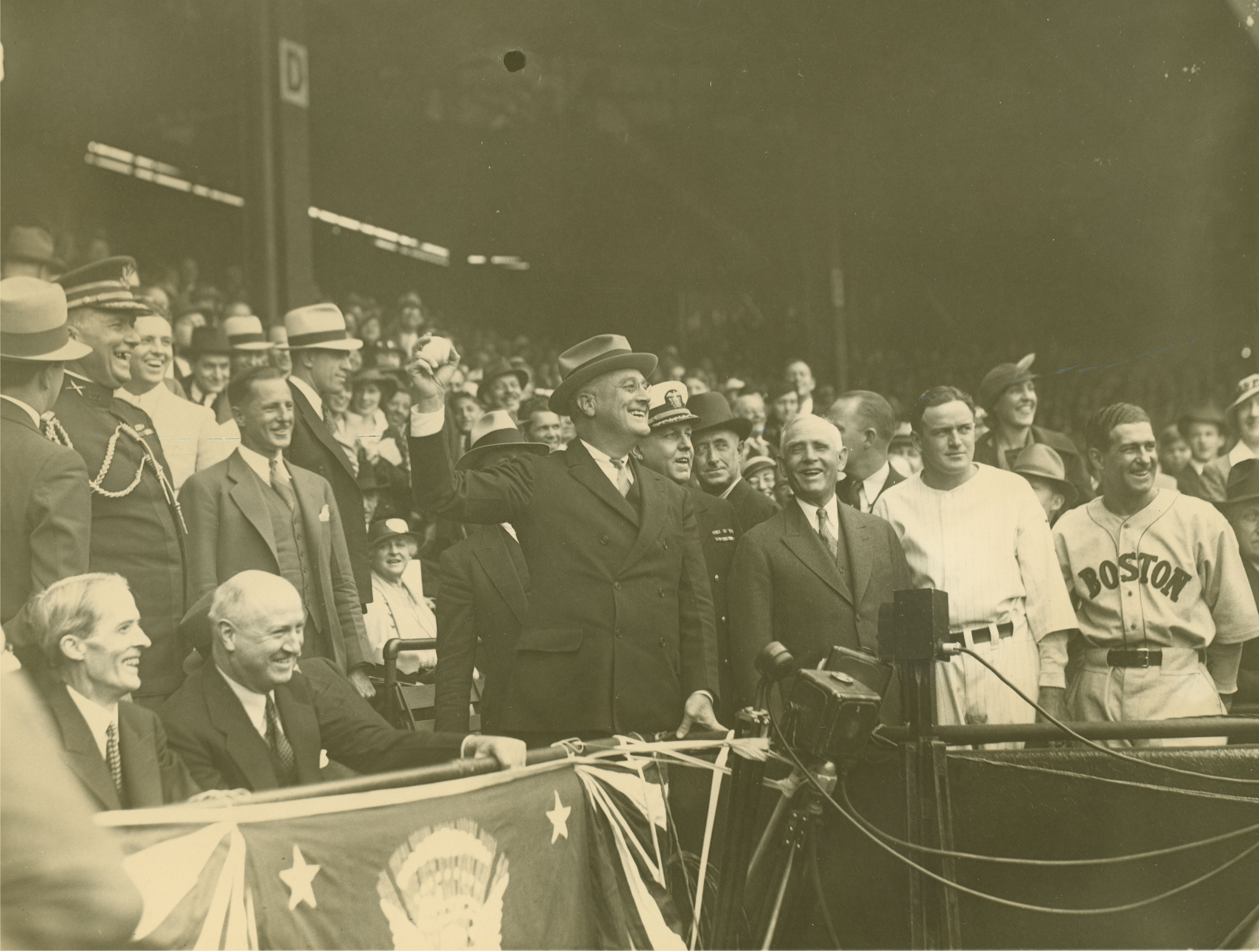
President Franklin D. Roosevelt throwing out the first pitch on Opening Day at Griffith Stadium.

=== Season standings ===
American League
Team	W	L	Pct.	GB	Home	Road
Detroit Tigers	101	53	.656	—	54‍–‍26	47‍–‍27
New York Yankees	94	60	.610	7	53‍–‍24	41‍–‍36
Cleveland Indians	85	69	.552	16	47‍–‍31	38‍–‍38
Boston Red Sox	76	76	.500	24	42‍–‍35	34‍–‍41
Philadelphia Athletics	68	82	.453	31	34‍–‍40	34‍–‍42
St. Louis Browns	67	85	.441	33	36‍–‍39	31‍–‍46
Washington Senators	66	86	.434	34	34‍–‍40	32‍–‍46
Chicago White Sox	53	99	.349	47	29‍–‍46	24‍–‍53

=== Record vs. opponents ===
1934 American League record Sources:
Team	BOS	CWS	CLE	DET	NYY	PHA	SLB	WSH
Boston	—	11–10	7–15	8–14	10–12	12–9	14–8	14–8–1
Chicago	10–11	—	8–14	5–17	5–17	9–13	7–14–1	9–13
Cleveland	15–7	14–8	—	6–16	11–11	13–9	15–7	11–11
Detroit	14–8	17–5	16–6	—	12–10	12–10	15–7	15–7
New York	12–10	17–5	11–11	10–12	—	15–7	17–5	12–10
Philadelphia	9–12	13–9	9–13	10–12	7–15	—	9–12–1	11–9–2
St. Louis	8–14	14–7–1	7–15	7–15	5–17	12–9–1	—	14–8
Washington	8–14–1	13–9	11–11	7–15	10–12	9–11–2	8–14	—

=== Notable transactions ===
- May 9, 1934: Bob Boken was traded by the Senators to the Chicago White Sox for Red Kress.

=== Roster ===
1934 Washington Senators
Roster
Pitchers: 29 Orville Armbrust; 10 Allen Benson; 18 Bobby Burke; 12 Syd Cohen; 12 Alvin Crowder; 22 Reese Diggs; -- Mark Filley; 20 Bob Kline; 29 Ed Linke; 26 Alex McColl; 30 John Milligan; 30 Ray Prim; 17 Jack Russell; 14 Lefty Stewart; 15 Tommy Thomas; 16 Monte Weaver; 11 Earl Whitehill	Catchers: 10 Moe Berg; 9 Cliff Bolton; 21 Elmer Klumpp; 32 Eddie Phillips; 8 Luke Sewell; Infielders: 7 Ossie Bluege; 25 Bob Boken; 4 Joe Cronin; 23 John Kerr; 25 Red Kress; 5 Joe Kuhel; 1 Buddy Myer; 19,22 Pete Susko; 20 Cecil Travis	Outfielders: 22 Gus Dugas; 19 Johnny Gill; 24 Dave Harris; 3 Heinie Manush; 9 Jake Powell; 6 Fred Schulte; 6 Fred Sington; 2 John Stone	Manager: 4 Joe Cronin; Coaches: 27 Nick Altrock; 23 Dickey Kerr; 28 Al Schacht

== Player stats ==
=== Batting ===
==== Starters by position ====
Note: Pos = Position; G = Games played; AB = At bats; H = Hits; Avg. = Batting average; HR = Home runs; RBI = Runs batted in

Pos	Player	G	AB	H	Avg.	HR	RBI
C	Eddie Phillips	56	169	33	.195	2	16
1B	Joe Kuhel	63	263	76	.289	3	25
2B	Buddy Myer	139	524	160	.305	3	57
3B	Cecil Travis	109	392	125	.319	1	53
SS	Joe Cronin	127	504	143	.284	7	101
OF	Fred Schulte	136	524	156	.298	3	73
OF	Heinie Manush	137	556	194	.349	11	89
OF	John Stone	113	419	132	.315	7	67

==== Other batters ====
Note: G = Games played; AB = At bats; H = Hits; Avg. = Batting average; HR = Home runs; RBI = Runs batted in

Player	G	AB	H	Avg.	HR	RBI
Ossie Bluege	99	285	70	.246	0	11
Dave Harris	97	235	59	.251	2	37
Pete Susko	58	224	64	.286	2	25
Luke Sewell	72	207	49	.237	2	21
Red Kress	56	171	39	.228	4	24
Cliff Bolton	42	148	40	.270	1	17
John Kerr	31	103	28	.272	0	12
Moe Berg	33	86	21	.244	0	6
Johnny Gill	13	53	13	.245	2	7
Jake Powell	9	35	10	.286	0	1
Fred Sington	9	35	10	.286	0	6
Bob Boken	11	27	6	.222	0	6
Gus Dugas	24	19	1	.053	0	1
Elmer Klumpp	12	15	2	.133	0	0

=== Pitching ===
==== Starting pitchers ====
Note: G = Games pitched; IP = Innings pitched; W = Wins; L = Losses; ERA = Earned run average; SO = Strikeouts

Player	G	IP	W	L	ERA	SO
Earl Whitehill	32	235.0	14	11	4.52	96
Monte Weaver	31	204.2	11	15	4.79	51
Lefty Stewart	24	152.0	7	11	4.03	36
Allen Benson	2	9.2	0	1	12.10	4

==== Other pitchers ====
Note: G = Games pitched; IP = Innings pitched; W = Wins; L = Losses; ERA = Earned run average; SO = Strikeouts

Player	G	IP	W	L	ERA	SO
Bobby Burke	37	168.0	8	8	3.21	52
Tommy Thomas	33	133.1	8	9	5.47	42
General Crowder	29	100.2	4	10	6.79	39
Ed Linke	7	34.2	2	2	4.15	9
Reese Diggs	4	21.1	1	2	6.75	2
Syd Cohen	3	18.0	1	1	7.50	6
Orville Armbrust	3	12.2	1	0	2.13	3

==== Relief pitchers ====
Note: G = Games pitched; W = Wins; L = Losses; SV = Saves; ERA = Earned run average; SO = Strikeouts

Player	G	W	L	SV	ERA	SO
Jack Russell	54	5	10	8	4.17	38
Alex McColl	42	3	4	2	3.86	29
Ray Prim	8	0	2	0	6.75	3
Bob Kline	6	1	0	0	15.75	1
John Milligan	2	0	0	0	10.13	1
Mark Filley	1	0	0	0	27.00	0

== Farm system ==
Level	Team	League	Manager
A	Chattanooga Lookouts	Southern Association	Zinn Beck and Mule Shirley
