= 1934 Philadelphia Athletics season =

1934 Philadelphia Athletics
- League: American League
- Ballpark: Shibe Park
- City: Philadelphia
- Record: 68–82 (.453)
- League place: 5th
- Owners: Connie Mack, Tom Shibe and John Shibe
- Managers: Connie Mack

The 1934 Philadelphia Athletics season involved the A's finishing fifth in the American League with a record of 68 wins and 82 losses.

== Offseason ==
- November 6, 1933: Tony Freitas, Gowell Claset, and cash were traded by the Athletics to the St. Paul Saints for Rip Radcliff.
- December 12, 1933: Mickey Cochrane was traded by the Athletics to the Detroit Tigers for Johnny Pasek and $100,000.
- December 12, 1933: Lefty Grove, Max Bishop and Rube Walberg were traded by the Athletics to the Boston Red Sox for Bob Kline, Rabbit Warstler, and $125,000.
- March 27, 1934: Rip Radcliff and George Detore were traded by the Athletics to the Louisville Colonels for Hank Erickson. Hank Erickson was returned to the Colonels in April 1934.

== Regular season ==
=== Season standings ===
American League
Team	W	L	Pct.	GB	Home	Road
Detroit Tigers	101	53	.656	—	54‍–‍26	47‍–‍27
New York Yankees	94	60	.610	7	53‍–‍24	41‍–‍36
Cleveland Indians	85	69	.552	16	47‍–‍31	38‍–‍38
Boston Red Sox	76	76	.500	24	42‍–‍35	34‍–‍41
Philadelphia Athletics	68	82	.453	31	34‍–‍40	34‍–‍42
St. Louis Browns	67	85	.441	33	36‍–‍39	31‍–‍46
Washington Senators	66	86	.434	34	34‍–‍40	32‍–‍46
Chicago White Sox	53	99	.349	47	29‍–‍46	24‍–‍53

=== Record vs. opponents ===
1934 American League record Sources:
Team	BOS	CWS	CLE	DET	NYY	PHA	SLB	WSH
Boston	—	11–10	7–15	8–14	10–12	12–9	14–8	14–8–1
Chicago	10–11	—	8–14	5–17	5–17	9–13	7–14–1	9–13
Cleveland	15–7	14–8	—	6–16	11–11	13–9	15–7	11–11
Detroit	14–8	17–5	16–6	—	12–10	12–10	15–7	15–7
New York	12–10	17–5	11–11	10–12	—	15–7	17–5	12–10
Philadelphia	9–12	13–9	9–13	10–12	7–15	—	9–12–1	11–9–2
St. Louis	8–14	14–7–1	7–15	7–15	5–17	12–9–1	—	14–8
Washington	8–14–1	13–9	11–11	7–15	10–12	9–11–2	8–14	—

=== Notable transactions ===
- May 14, 1934: Ed Madjeski was released by the Athletics.
- August 9, 1934: Wally Moses was purchased by the Athletics from the Galveston Buccaneers.

=== Roster ===
1934 Philadelphia Athletics
Roster
Pitchers: 21 Al Benton; 11 Sugar Cain; 20 Joe Cascarella; -- George Caster; 14 Bill Dietrich; 15 Mort Flohr; 16 Bob Kline; 19 Ed Lagger; 17 Roy Mahaffey; 12 Johnny Marcum; 19 Harry Matuzak; 15 Tim McKeithan; 16 Roy Vaughn; 18,26 Whitey Wilshere; -- Jack Wilson	Catchers: 2 Charlie Berry; 28 Frankie Hayes; 10 Ed Madjeski; 10 Charlie Moss; Infielders: 3 Jimmie Foxx; 5 Pinky Higgins; 6 Eric McNair; 22 Rabbit Warstler; 4 Dib Williams	Outfielders: 9 Ed Coleman; 8 Doc Cramer; 23 Lou Finney; 7 Bob Johnson; 10 Jerry McQuaig; 27 Bing Miller	Manager: Connie Mack; Coaches: 31 Lena Blackburne; 30 Earle Mack; 32 Eddie Rommel

== Player stats ==
=== Batting ===
==== Starters by position ====
Note: Pos = Position; G = Games played; AB = At bats; H = Hits; Avg. = Batting average; HR = Home runs; RBI = Runs batted in

Pos	Player	G	AB	H	Avg.	HR	RBI
C	Charlie Berry	99	269	72	.268	0	34
1B	Jimmie Foxx	150	539	180	.334	44	130
2B	Rabbit Warstler	117	419	99	.236	1	36
3B	Pinky Higgins	144	543	179	.330	16	90
SS	Eric McNair	151	599	168	.280	17	82
OF	Doc Cramer	153	649	202	.311	6	46
OF	Bob Johnson	141	547	168	.307	34	92
OF	Ed Coleman	101	329	92	.280	14	60

==== Other batters ====
Note: G = Games played; AB = At bats; H = Hits; Avg. = Batting average; HR = Home runs; RBI = Runs batted in

Player	G	AB	H	Avg.	HR	RBI
Lou Finney	92	272	76	.279	1	28
Frankie Hayes	92	248	56	.226	6	30
Dib Williams	66	205	56	.273	2	17
Bing Miller	81	177	43	.243	1	22
Jerry McQuaig	7	16	1	.063	0	1
Charlie Moss	10	10	2	.200	0	1
Ed Madjeski	8	8	3	.375	0	2

=== Pitching ===
==== Starting pitchers ====
Note: G = Games pitched; IP = Innings pitched; W = Wins; L = Losses; ERA = Earned run average; SO = Strikeouts

Player	G	IP	W	L	ERA	SO
Johnny Marcum	37	232.0	14	11	4.50	92
Sugar Cain	36	230.2	9	17	4.41	66
Jack Wilson	2	9.0	0	1	12.00	2

==== Other pitchers ====
Note: G = Games pitched; IP = Innings pitched; W = Wins; L = Losses; ERA = Earned run average; SO = Strikeouts

Player	G	IP	W	L	ERA	SO
Bill Dietrich	39	207.2	11	12	4.68	88
Joe Cascarella	42	194.1	12	15	4.68	71
Al Benton	32	155.0	7	9	4.88	58
Roy Mahaffey	37	129.0	6	7	5.37	37
George Caster	5	37.0	3	2	3.41	15
Mort Flohr	14	30.2	0	2	5.87	6
Whitey Wilshere	9	21.2	0	1	12.05	19

==== Relief pitchers ====
Note: G = Games pitched; W = Wins; L = Losses; SV = Saves; ERA = Earned run average; SO = Strikeouts

Player	G	W	L	SV	ERA	SO
Bob Kline	20	6	2	1	6.35	14
Harry Matuzak	11	0	3	0	4.88	9
Ed Lagger	8	0	0	0	11.00	2
Tim McKeithan	3	0	0	0	15.75	0
Roy Vaughn	2	0	0	0	2.08	1
