= 1934 Detroit Tigers season =

Major League Baseball season

1934 Detroit Tigers
- American League Champion
- League: American League
- Ballpark: Navin Field
- City: Detroit, Michigan
- Record: 101–53 (.656)
- League place: 1st
- Owners: Frank Navin
- Managers: Mickey Cochrane
- Radio: WWJ (AM) (Ty Tyson); WXYZ (Harry Heilmann)

The 1934 Detroit Tigers season was the 34th season for the Detroit Tigers since entering the American League in 1901. The Tigers won the American League pennant with a record of 101–53, the best winning percentage in team history. The team made its fourth World Series appearance, but lost the 1934 World Series to the St. Louis Cardinals 4 games to 3.

== Pre-season ==
The 1933 Detroit Tigers finished fifth in the American League with a record of 75–79, 25 games behind the Washington Senators. In mid-December 1933, team owner Frank Navin took two key steps to strengthen his team for the 1934 season. On December 12, 1933, the Tigers announced that they had purchased Mickey Cochrane from Connie Mack and the Philadelphia Athletics in exchange for Johnny Pasek and cash. The Tigers announced that they intended to use Cochrane as both a player and the team's manager. One day later, on December 13, 1933, the Tigers' new manager Cochrane negotiated a trade that brought outfielder Goose Goslin to the Tigers in exchange for Johnny Stone.

== Regular season ==
=== Season summary ===
The Tigers won the American League pennant with a record of 101–53, finishing seven games ahead of the New York Yankees, and compiling the best winning percentage in Detroit Tigers history (either before or after). They outscored their opponents 958 to 708 and also finished 1st in attendance with 919,161.

The 1934 Tigers' winning percentage ranks as the best in team history, as follows:

Best Seasons in Detroit Tigers History
Rank	Year	Wins	Losses	Win %	Finish
1	1934	101	53	.656	Lost 1934 World Series to Cardinals
2	1915	100	54	.649	2nd in AL behind Red Sox
3	1909	98	54	.645	Lost 1909 World Series to Pirates
4	1984	104	58	.642	Won 1984 World Series over Padres
5	1968	103	59	.636	Won 1968 World Series over Cardinals

=== The Players ===
==== Catcher/Manager: Mickey Cochrane ====
Hall of Famer Mickey Cochrane was hired as the team's manager and catcher in the off-season before the 1934 season started. Cochrane was acquired by the Tigers on December 12, 1933, from the Philadelphia Athletics for Johnny Pasek and $100,000. Known as "Black Mike", Cochrane is considered one of the greatest catchers of all time. In 1934, he won the American League's Most Valuable Player award, batting .320 with a .428 on-base percentage, 76 RBIs, and 32 doubles. He was the first catcher to win the American League MVP award Aside from his contributions as a player, Cochrane was invaluable as a manager and leader. Second baseman Charlie Gehringer later said: "When Mickey was managing the Tigers from behind the plate I can't remember him ever fouling up anything. Seemed like he made snap judgments that always worked out well, especially in '34 and '35."

==== Infield: Greenberg, Gehringer, Rogell, and Owen ====
The Detroit infield in the mid-1930s was one of the best-hitting combinations in major league history. With Hank Greenberg at first, Gehringer at second, Billy Rogell at shortstop, and Marv Owen at third, the 1934 Tigers infield collected 769 hits (214 by Gehringer, 201 by Greenberg, 179 by Owen and 175 by Rogell), 462 RBIs (139 by Greenberg, 127 by Gehringer, 100 by Rogell, and 96 by Owen), and 179 doubles (63 by Greenberg, 50 by Gehringer, 34 by Owen and 32 by Rogell). Three members of the 1934 Tigers infield (Gehringer, Owen and Rogell) played in all 154 games, and the fourth (Greenberg) played in 153.

"Hammerin' Hank" Greenberg played his second major league season in 1934, hitting .339 with 118 runs and 201 hits. He led the league with 63 doubles, and he was third in the AL with a .600 slugging percentage and 139 RBIs. Late in the 1934 season, he announced that he would not play on Rosh Hashanah, the Jewish New Year. Fans grumbled, "Rosh Hashanah comes every year but the Tigers haven't won the pennant since 1909." Greenberg did considerable soul-searching, and discussed the matter with his rabbi; finally he relented and agreed to play on Rosh Hashanah, but stuck with his decision not to play on the Day of Atonement, Yom Kippur. Of the latter decision, Detroit Free Press columnist and poet Edgar A. Guest expressed the general opinion in a poem titled "Speaking of Greenberg", in which he used the Irish (and thus Catholic) names Murphy and Mulroney. The poem ends with the lines "We shall miss him on the infield and shall miss him at the bat / But he's true to his religion—and I honor him for that." The complete text of the poem is at the end of Greenberg's biography page at the website of the International Jewish Sports Hall of Fame.

Charlie Gehringer had his best year to date in 1934, playing all 154 games. His .356 batting average and .450 on-base percentage were both 2nd best in the league. He led the league in runs scored with 134 and hits with 214. He was also among the league leaders in doubles with 50 (2nd in AL to his teammate Hank Greenberg) and RBIs with a career-high 127 (5th in AL). Gehringer finished 2nd in the AL MVP voting, just 2 points behind Detroit's player-manager, Mickey Cochrane. Known for his consistency as a hitter and fielder, Gehringer was given the nickname "The Mechanical Man" by Yankee pitcher Lefty Gomez. Mickey Cochrane joked that "Charlie says `hello' on Opening Day, `goodbye' on closing day, and in between hits .350."

Shortstop Billy Rogell had the best offensive season of his career in 1934, hitting .296, driving in 100 runs and scoring 114. He spent much of the season batting fifth, frequently hitting after Cochrane, Gehringer, and Goslin and ahead of Greenberg, all four of whom were future Hall of Famers. Rogell, unbeknownst to the Cardinals or the media, played the 1934 World Series on a broken ankle. Despite the injury he was able to collect eight hits and drive in four runs over the seven-game series. He also found his way into one of the most popular plays in World Series history. After driving in a run with a single to right in the fourth inning of Game 4, Spud Davis was replaced by Hall of Famer Dizzy Dean as a pinch runner at first base. Pepper Martin then stepped in and hit a ground ball to Gehringer at second. Gehringer turned and threw to Rogell who forced out Dean at second, and then fired the ball squarely into Dean's forehead on the relay throw to first. The ball ricocheted off Dean's head and landed over a hundred feet away in the outfield. Dean, always known for his quick wit and humorous nature, remarked after a visit to the hospital, "The doctors X-rayed my head and found nothing." Rogell would say of the play later, "If I'd have known his head was there, I would have thrown the ball harder."

Marv Owen batted .317 with 96 RBIs in 1934 and finished 9th in the AL MVP voting. Owen is remembered for a famous incident in Game 7 of the 1934 World Series. Joe Medwick tripled in the 6th inning with the Cardinals ahead by 7 runs. He slid hard into Owen at third, knocking him down. The two fought, and Detroit fans pelted Medwick with fruit and garbage when he returned to left field. As the fan reaction escalated, Commissioner Kenesaw Mountain Landis ordered Medwick removed from the game. Owen batted just .069 (2–29) in the 1934 World Series.

==== Outfield: Goslin, Fox, White and Walker ====
In the outfield, Hall of Famer Goose Goslin played in left field, Pete Fox was the primary right fielder, and the speedy Jo-Jo White and Gee Walker shared most of the responsibility for center field, with White playing in 92 games there (and 100 total games in the outfield).

Pete Fox hit .285, hit 31 doubles, stole 25 bases, and scored 101 runs.

Goose Goslin had a good year with a .305 batting average, 100 RBIs, 106 runs scored, 187 hits, and 38 doubles. After leading the Washington Senators to American League pennants in 1924, 1925, and 1933, owner Clark Griffith traded Goslin to Detroit before the 1934 season. Griffith told Goose he simply couldn't afford to pay his salary. With stars Goslin, Gehringer and Greenberg, the 1934 Tigers became known as the "G-Men."

Center fielder Jo-Jo White hit .313, scored 97 runs, had a .419 on-base percentage, and led the team with 28 stolen bases. White's real first name was Joyner, but he was called "Jo-Jo" because of the way he pronounced his native state of Georgia. Hank Greenberg, who was raised in the Bronx was roommates with White, and according to Greenberg the two of them "used to fight the Civil War every night." Greenberg recalled a game in which White stole home with Greenberg at bat: "He deprived me of a good chance at an RBI, and he did it deliberately because he knew it would burn me up."

Gee Walker, the Tigers fourth outfielder, played in 98 games (80 in the outfield). Known as "The Madman from Mississippi", Walker was a fiery competitor who became a fan favorite in Detroit. He hit .300 for the 1934 Tigers with 20 stolen bases. Though he was regularly among the league leaders in stolen bases, he also developed a reputation for being inattentive and overzealous on the basepaths. He once tried to steal a base while the batter was being given an intentional walk. During the 1934 World Series, he was picked off first while arguing with the Cardinals' bench. On June 30, 1934, Walker was picked off base twice in the same inning. After Hank Greenberg singled, Walker reached base on an error, but was caught off base when the catcher threw to first base. Greenberg tried to draw a throw by running to third base and was thrown out, with Walker taking second base. Moments later, with Walker standing six feet off the bag, the pitcher threw to second base and Walker was tagged out. Detroit manager Mickey Cochrane was so angered by Walker's inattention that he suspended Walker for 10 days and fined him $20.

==== Pitching: Bridges, Rowe, Auker, Marberry and Hogsett ====
The pitching staff was led by starters Tommy Bridges, Schoolboy Rowe, Elden Auker, and Alvin Crowder, who joined the team in August.

Tommy Bridges had a record of 22–11. In 35 starts, Bridges threw 23 complete games. He had 151 strikeouts, and a 3.67 ERA. In a nationwide poll, Bridges was named the No. 2 sports hero of 1935, behind Notre Dame football player Andy Pilney.

Schoolboy Rowe had the best record on the club at 24–8. At one point in the season, he won 16 consecutive decisions. Schoolboy became a fan favorite not only for his pitching performance in 1934 but for his nationally publicized romance. While appearing on the Eddie Cantor radio show, Rowe famously asked his fiancée, "How'm I doing, Edna honey?" The line endeared Schoolboy to the nation, and also resulted in relentless teasing from opposing players and fans. Schoolboy and Edna married after the 1934 season and had their first child during the 1935 season.

Elden Auker, a 23-year-old underhand pitcher out of Kansas A&M, also had a big year for the 1934 Tigers. Auker was 15–7 with a 3.42 ERA. During the 1935 World Series, Auker was interviewed by a young Cubs broadcaster, Ronald Reagan. When they met after Reagan had been elected Governor of California, Reagan told him, "You probably won't remember me, but I'll remember you as long as I live." The 1935 radio interview, Reagan said, "was my first big break."

The Tigers' #4 starter was Vic Sorrell. Sorrell was 6–9 with a 4.79 ERA.

The Tigers did not employ a closer in the modern sense, as their 14 team saves were recorded by 9 different pitchers. Firpo Marberry and Elon Hogsett led the way with three saves each. Marberry was one of the first relief specialists in the major leagues, though he also started many games. In 1934, Marberry appeared in 38 games, starting 19 and finishing 14, and had a record of 15–5. Elon "Chief" Hogsett became a fan favorite as well, having a 3–2 record in 26 games. When Hogsett would take the mound at Navin Field, Detroit fans greeted him with "war whoops." Hogsett later reported that, while he was "one-thirty-second Cherokee on my mother's side", he got the nickname in the minor leagues when he "roomed with a full-blooded Kiowa Indian and the nickname just kind of stuck."

=== Season standings ===
American League
Team	W	L	Pct.	GB	Home	Road
Detroit Tigers	101	53	.656	—	54‍–‍26	47‍–‍27
New York Yankees	94	60	.610	7	53‍–‍24	41‍–‍36
Cleveland Indians	85	69	.552	16	47‍–‍31	38‍–‍38
Boston Red Sox	76	76	.500	24	42‍–‍35	34‍–‍41
Philadelphia Athletics	68	82	.453	31	34‍–‍40	34‍–‍42
St. Louis Browns	67	85	.441	33	36‍–‍39	31‍–‍46
Washington Senators	66	86	.434	34	34‍–‍40	32‍–‍46
Chicago White Sox	53	99	.349	47	29‍–‍46	24‍–‍53

=== Record vs. opponents ===
1934 American League record Sources:
Team	BOS	CWS	CLE	DET	NYY	PHA	SLB	WSH
Boston	—	11–10	7–15	8–14	10–12	12–9	14–8	14–8–1
Chicago	10–11	—	8–14	5–17	5–17	9–13	7–14–1	9–13
Cleveland	15–7	14–8	—	6–16	11–11	13–9	15–7	11–11
Detroit	14–8	17–5	16–6	—	12–10	12–10	15–7	15–7
New York	12–10	17–5	11–11	10–12	—	15–7	17–5	12–10
Philadelphia	9–12	13–9	9–13	10–12	7–15	—	9–12–1	11–9–2
St. Louis	8–14	14–7–1	7–15	7–15	5–17	12–9–1	—	14–8
Washington	8–14–1	13–9	11–11	7–15	10–12	9–11–2	8–14	—

=== Roster ===
1934 Detroit Tigers
Roster
Pitchers: 13 Elden Auker; 10 Tommy Bridges; 16 Alvin Crowder; 15 Carl Fischer; 16 Vic Frazier; 20 Luke Hamlin; 17 Elon Hogsett; 19 Steve Larkin; 11 Firpo Marberry; 19 Red Phillips; 14 Schoolboy Rowe; 18 Vic Sorrell	Catchers: 3 Mickey Cochrane; 23 Ray Hayworth; 19 Rudy York; Infielders: 24 Flea Clifton; 2 Charlie Gehringer; 5 Hank Greenberg; 8 Marv Owen; 7 Billy Rogell; 22 Heinie Schuble	Outfielders: 26 Frank Doljack; 12 Pete Fox; 4 Goose Goslin; 6 Gee Walker; 25 Jo-Jo White; Other batters: 31 Cy Perkins; 21 Frank Reiber; 19 Icehouse Wilson	Manager: 3 Mickey Cochrane; Coaches: 32 Del Baker; 31 Cy Perkins

=== Season highlights ===
- April 17: The Tigers opened their season with an 8–4 victory over the Chicago White Sox at Comiskey Park. Despite having been hospitalized two days earlier with a broken nose and concussion, Goose Goslin played the entire game for the Tigers. Firpo Marberry was the Tigers' opening day starter.
- April 24: The Tigers defeated the White Sox in their home opener, 7–3, in front of a crowd of 24,000 on a cold day at Navin Field in Detroit.
- April 28: Goose Goslin hit into four consecutive double plays‚ but the Tigers beat the Cleveland Indians, 4–1. Marv Owen had unassisted double plays in consecutive games on the 28th and 29th.
- May 7: The Tigers beat the Boston Red Sox, 8–6. Schoolboy Rowe was the winning pitcher and won the game with a home run.
- May 27: Detroit beat Boston, 9–2. Schoolboy Rowe pitched a complete game.
- June 6: The Tigers beat the Indians, 2–1, despite a one-hitter by Cleveland pitcher Bob Weiland. Charlie Gehringer's RBI single was the only hit. Goose Goslin's hit streak ended at 30 games. The victory by Schoolboy Rowe put the Tigers in 1st place.
- June 15: Schoolboy Rowe got the win over the Red Sox‚ 11–4‚ scattering 9 hits. This was the start of Rowe's 16-game win streak.
- June 20: The Tigers beat the Senators, 13–10. They scored three runs in the 11th inning. Marv Owen‚ Mickey Cochrane‚ Charlie Gehringer‚ and Hank Greenberg each had three hits.

== Player stats ==
= Indicates team leader

= Indicates league leader

=== Batting ===
==== Starters by position ====
Note: Pos = Position; G = Games played; AB = At bats; H = Hits; Avg. = Batting average; HR = Home runs; RBI = Runs batted in

Pos	Player	G	AB	H	Avg.	HR	RBI
C	Mickey Cochrane	129	437	140	.320	2	76
1B	Hank Greenberg	153	593	201	.339	26	139
2B	Charlie Gehringer	154	601	214	.356	11	127
3B	Marv Owen	154	565	179	.317	8	96
SS	Billy Rogell	154	592	175	.296	3	100
OF	Goose Goslin	151	614	187	.305	13	100
OF	Pete Fox	128	516	147	.285	2	45
OF	Jo-Jo White	115	384	120	.313	0	44

==== Other batters ====
Note: G = Games played; AB = At bats; H = Hits; Avg. = Batting average; HR = Home runs; RBI = Runs batted in

Player	G	AB	H	Avg.	HR	RBI
Gee Walker	98	347	104	.300	6	39
Ray Hayworth	54	167	49	.293	0	27
Frank Doljack	56	120	28	.233	1	19
Flea Clifton	16	16	1	.063	0	1
Heinie Schuble	11	15	4	.267	0	2
Rudy York	3	6	1	.167	0	0
Cy Perkins	1	1	0	.000	0	0
Frank Reiber	3	1	0	.000	0	0
Icehouse Wilson	1	1	0	.000	0	0

Note: pitchers' batting statistics not included

=== Pitching ===
==== Starting pitchers ====
Note: G = Games pitched; IP = Innings pitched; W = Wins; L = Losses; ERA = Earned run average; SO = Strikeouts

Player	G	IP	W	L	ERA	SO
Tommy Bridges	36	275.0	22	11	3.67	151
Schoolboy Rowe	45	266.0	24	8	3.45	149
Vic Sorrell	28	129.2	6	9	4.79	46
Carl Fischer	20	95.0	6	4	4.36	39
Alvin Crowder	9	66.2	5	1	4.19	30

==== Other pitchers ====
Note: G = Games pitched; IP = Innings pitched; W = Wins; L = Losses; ERA = Earned run average; SO = Strikeouts

Player	G	IP	W	L	ERA	SO
Elden Auker	43	205.0	15	7	3.42	86
Firpo Marberry	38	155.2	15	5	4.57	64
Luke Hamlin	20	75.1	2	3	5.38	30
Vic Frazier	8	22.2	1	3	5.96	11
Steve Larkin	2	6.0	0	0	1.50	8

Note: Marberry tied with Hogsett in team saves with 3.

=== Relief pitchers ===
Note: G = Games pitched; W= Wins; L= Losses; SV = Saves; ERA = Earned run average; SO = Strikeouts

Player	G	W	L	SV	ERA	SO
Elon Hogsett	26	3	2	3	4.29	23
Red Phillips	7	2	0	1	6.17	3

== 1934 World Series ==
The 1934 World Series was a match-up between the St. Louis Cardinals' "Gashouse Gang" and Detroit's "G-Men" (so named because of stars Gehringer, Greenberg, and Goslin). Even nearly 50 years later, Charlie Gehringer (interviewed in 1982) felt the Tigers were robbed of the 1934 championship by umpire Brick Owens. Detroit was ahead 3 games to 2, and in Gehringer's view "we should've won the sixth game." Late in the game, Brick Owens called Mickey Cochrane out on a play at third base "even though all of the photographs show that he was safe by a mile." Gehringer insisted that, if Cochrane had been called safe, "we would've had the bases loaded with nobody out and we could've had a big inning."

The Tigers wound up losing Game 6 by one run. They then lost Game 7 in an 11–0 shutout thrown by Dizzy Dean, despite a 2-for-4 game from Gehringer.

In the sixth inning of Game 7, Joe Medwick slid hard into Marv Owen, the Tigers' third baseman, after hitting a triple. They tangled briefly, and when Medwick went to his position in left field, the Detroit fans, knowing the game was lost (the score was 9–0 by then), vented their frustrations on Medwick, throwing fruit, vegetables, bottles, cushions, etc., at him. Commissioner Landis ordered Medwick benched to end the ruckus. Newsreel footage shows Medwick slamming his glove onto the dugout bench in disgust. (Audio)

Pete Fox played for the Tigers and became the only World Series player to hit six (6) doubles in any Series of any length.

NL St. Louis Cardinals (4) vs. AL Detroit Tigers (3)

Game	Score	Date	Location	Attendance
1	Cardinals – 8, Tigers – 3	October 3	Navin Field	42,505
2	Cardinals – 2, Tigers – 3 (12 innings)	October 4	Navin Field	43,451
3	Tigers – 1, Cardinals – 4	October 5	Sportsman's Park	34,073
4	Tigers – 10, Cardinals – 4	October 6	Sportsman's Park	37,492
5	Tigers – 3, Cardinals – 1	October 7	Sportsman's Park	38,536
6	Cardinals – 4, Tigers – 3	October 8	Navin Field	44,551
7	Cardinals – 11, Tigers – 0	October 9	Navin Field	40,902

== Awards and honors ==
- Mickey Cochrane: AL Most Valuable Player Award

=== League leaders ===
- Tommy Bridges: AL leader in games started (35)
- Charlie Gehringer: MLB leader in hits (214)
- Charlie Gehringer: AL leader in runs (134)
- Hank Greenberg: MLB leader in doubles (63)
- Hank Greenberg: MLB leader in extra base hits (96)
- Schoolboy Rowe: AL leader in strikeout to walk ratio (1.84)

=== Players ranking among top 100 all time at position ===
The following members of the 1934 Detroit Tigers are among the Top 100 of all time at their position, as ranked by The New Bill James Historical Baseball Abstract in 2001:

- Mickey Cochrane: 4th best catcher of all time
- Hank Greenberg: 8th best first baseman of all time
- Charlie Gehringer: 8th best second baseman of all time
- Billy Rogell: 49th best shortstop of all time
- Goose Goslin: 16th best left fielder of all time
- Gee Walker: 92nd best left fielder of all time
- Pete Fox: 96th best right fielder of all time
- Tommy Bridges: 77th best pitcher of all time

== Farm system ==
Level	Team	League	Manager
AA	Toledo Mud Hens	American Association	Steve O'Neill
A	Beaumont Exporters	Texas League	Dutch Lorbeer
C	Shreveport Sports/Greenwood Chiefs	East Dixie League	Jerry Mallett and Slim Brewer
C	Charleston Senators	Middle Atlantic League	Charlie Niebergall
C	Muskogee Tigers	Western Association	Conrad Fisher
D	Charleroi Tigers	Pennsylvania State Association	Dixie Parker

Shreveport club transferred to Greenwood and renamed, July 13, 1934
