= Fire sale =

Sale of goods at extremely discounted prices

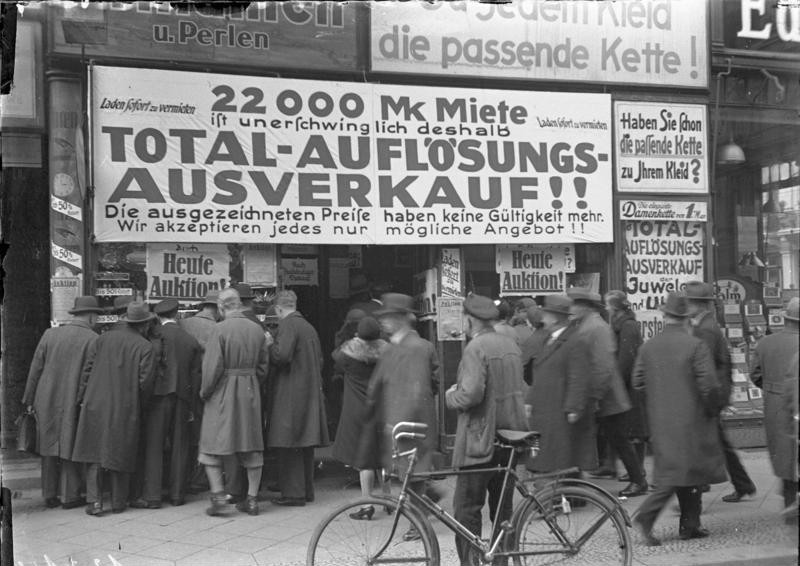
Closeout fire sale in Berlin, Germany, 1931. The sign says that the store is closing as it cannot afford the rent.

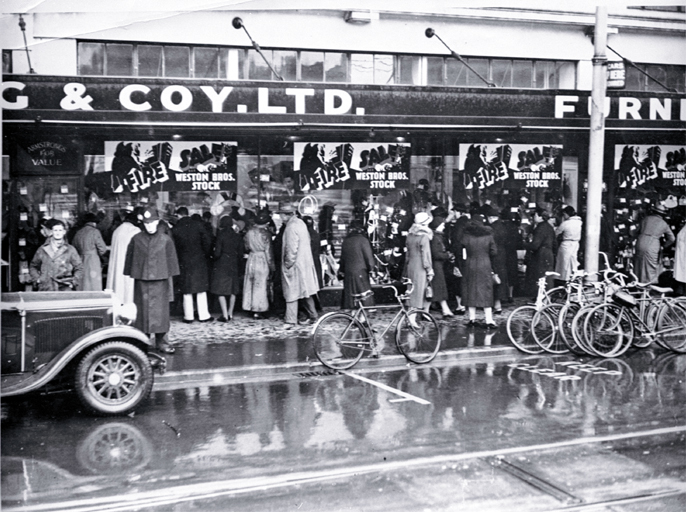
Fire sale in Christchurch, New Zealand, c. 1933

A fire sale is the sale of goods at extremely discounted prices. The term originated in reference to the sale of goods at a heavy discount due to fire damage. It may or may not be defined as a closeout, the final sale of goods to zero inventory. They are said to occur in the financial markets when bidders who value assets highly are prevented from bidding on them, depressing the average selling price below what it otherwise would be. This lowering of the price can cause even further issues because it may be inaccurately perceived as signalling negative information.

== History ==
The term is adapted from reference to the sale of fire-damaged goods at reduced prices. In Proceedings of the Fitchburg [Mass.] Historical Society and Papers Relating to the History of the Town Read by Some of the Members the following entry is found:

In December, 1856, the account of an extensive fire in the American House mentions the following occupants: E. B. Gee, clothing; T. B. Choate, drugs; J. C. Tenney, boots and shoes; Maraton Upton, dry goods; and M. W. Hayward, groceries. Maraton Upton removed his stock to No. 9 Rollstone block, and advertised "Extraordinary fire sale; customers are invited to call and examine goods which are still warm."

The term also has a counterpart in "railroad salvage", the discount sale of goods damaged in derailment or other accidents.

According to Plutarch, Crassus would show up to a burning building with a fire brigade and offer to put out the fire, or sometimes to buy the property at an outrageous discount. If the owner agreed, he would put out the fire. If they refused, he would stand by and let it burn.

== Sports ==
In professional sports, a fire sale occurs when a team trades many of its veteran players, especially expensive star players, to other teams for less expensive and usually younger players. Teams usually have a fire sale for financial reasons. The term is generally thought of as different from merely "rebuilding" a team, because during a rebuilding process, teams often obtain players who are already in the major leagues or who are close to being major-league-ready, while retaining at least some of their key veterans (such as a franchise player) while also getting players from their minor league system; most rebuilding teams have few veterans remaining to jettison in the first place. On the other hand, trades in a fire sale often bring a team draft picks and prospects who have little to no major-league experience in their sport, in exchange for proven, experienced veterans. The term comes from the perception that the team is trying to get rid of all its players.

=== Baseball ===
In sports, the term fire sale is especially used in Major League Baseball, where the most infamous fire sale occurred in 1997. Weeks after winning the 1997 World Series, the Florida Marlins began trading away several of their high-salary players and key cogs in their championship run, with Moisés Alou and Al Leiter among the first of many to go throughout the off-season and well into the 1998 season. Alou would go to the Houston Astros, and Leiter would go to the New York Mets. This ended any realistic chance of the Marlins' title defense. They plummeted to a 54–108 record in 1998, the worst ever by a defending World Series champion.

Owner and manager Connie Mack put the Philadelphia Athletics through a fire sale twice. In 1914, the Athletics lost the 1914 World Series to the "Miracle Braves" in a four-game sweep. Mack traded, sold or released most of the team's star players soon after, in what could be considered as the first fire sale in organized sports.

The second and more consequential fire sale came after the 1933 season. On December 12, Mack traded Mickey Cochrane to the Detroit Tigers for Johnny Pasek and $100,000 and then traded Pasek and former 20-game winner George Earnshaw to the Chicago White Sox for Charlie Berry and $20,000. On the same day he traded another future Hall of Famer, sending Lefty Grove, Max Bishop and Rube Walberg to the Boston Red Sox for Rabbit Warstler, Bob Kline and $125,000. Between 1933 and 1935 the Athletics also traded or sold Jimmie Foxx, Al Simmons, Doc Cramer, and Jimmie Dykes. The Athletics would never come close to having the success they had before the fire sale and the team eventually moved to Kansas City in 1955.

The Athletics went through another major fire sale in anticipation of a move to Las Vegas. In April 2023, the Athletics ceased negotiations with the city of Oakland, California, where the team had played since 1968, in favor of constructing a stadium on a plot of land near Interstate 15. This was eventually changed to the plot of land where the Tropicana hotel and casino sits due to problems with the land that was originally chosen. The fire sale was seen by many as a way to provide a reason for this move. In response, Athletics fans hung several banners deriding team ownership and calling for the team to remain in Oakland at the Coliseum, which were controversially cropped out on the MLB.tv broadcast. The fire sale had taken place since the beginning of the 2022 season, when the Athletics suffered their worst season since 1979, losing 102 games. Despite fan protests, during the 2023 All-Star Game, Rob Manfred confirmed that relocation papers had been filed and that relocation proceedings had begun following the approval of a Nevada legislative package providing funding for the move.

Another infamous fire sale occurred in 1994. The Montreal Expos ended the strike-shortened 1994 season with the best record in the majors. But by the start of the following season, many of the team's young stars had either been traded or lost to free agency. The Expos never really recovered on or off the field from this, and moved to Washington, D.C., as the Nationals in 2005.

The Miami Marlins had another controversial fire sale in the 2012–2013 offseason. In a massive, 12-player trade with the Toronto Blue Jays, they sent away such players as Josh Johnson, José Reyes, and Mark Buehrle.

In the 2017–18 offseason, the Marlins had yet another fire sale. After longtime owner Jeffrey Loria sold the team to a group led by former MLB player Derek Jeter and Bruce Sherman, nearly all of the team's star players, notably Giancarlo Stanton, Christian Yelich, and Marcell Ozuna, were traded to different teams across the major leagues. The motive for the team dismantling was primarily to help lessen payroll to pay off the organization's outstanding debt, only six years after opening their new stadium, LoanDepot Park. The team's popularity notably declined in 2018 as a result of the fire sale, with the team's attendance falling to the lowest in Major League Baseball.

Another infamous fire sale took place immediately after the 2021-22 MLB lockout, when the Cincinnati Reds traded, refused to sign, or waived most of their star players, including Nick Castellanos, Jesse Winker, and Eugenio Suarez. This led to fan protests on social media and at Great American Ball Park, which in turn led to Phil Castellini telling fans "Where are you gonna go?" and "Be careful what you ask for" in an interview with WLW. The Reds went on to only win 3 of their first 25 games, and ended up with a record of 62–100, which was only the 2nd time the Reds lost at least 100 games in a season.

=== Other sports ===
The Ottawa Senators had a fire sale during the 2018–19 season. Several star players like Matt Duchene, Mike Hoffman, Mark Stone and team captain Erik Karlsson were traded in exchange for declining veterans, prospects and draft picks. Many perceived the fire sale as Senators' management being unwilling to sign stars to long-term, expensive extensions, as many of them would be eligible to become free agents after the season. The Senators would finish dead last in 2018–19, while their former stars found success on other teams, and fan attendance and support dropped significantly due to a lack of good will with Senators ownership and the fanbase. Duchene would go to the Columbus Blue Jackets, Stone would go to the Vegas Golden Knights, and Karlsson would go to the San Jose Sharks.

In association football, clubs which go through financial troubles or are relegated and dropped into a lower division may need to go through a fire sale to reduce their operating expenses or replace the revenue lost from leaving the superior division. Players who are deemed to have overinflated wages or a lack of quality may be sold for low or no transfer fees in order to get their wage off the books.

== See also ==
- Suggested retail price
