= 1934 St. Louis Browns season =

Major League Baseball season

1934 St. Louis Browns
- League: American League
- Ballpark: Sportsman's Park
- City: St. Louis, Missouri
- Record: 67–85 (.441)
- League place: 6th
- Owners: Estate of Phil Ball
- Managers: Rogers Hornsby
- Radio: KMOX (France Laux); KWK (Bob Thomas, Ray Schmidt)

The 1934 St. Louis Browns season involved the Browns finishing 6th in the American League with a record of 67 wins and 85 losses.

== Offseason ==
- December 15, 1933: Ray Pepper was purchased by the Browns from the St. Louis Cardinals.

== Regular season ==
=== Season standings ===
American League
| Team | W | L | Pct. | GB | Home | Road |
|---|---|---|---|---|---|---|
| Detroit Tigers | 101 | 53 | .656 | — | 54‍–‍26 | 47‍–‍27 |
| New York Yankees | 94 | 60 | .610 | 7 | 53‍–‍24 | 41‍–‍36 |
| Cleveland Indians | 85 | 69 | .552 | 16 | 47‍–‍31 | 38‍–‍38 |
| Boston Red Sox | 76 | 76 | .500 | 24 | 42‍–‍35 | 34‍–‍41 |
| Philadelphia Athletics | 68 | 82 | .453 | 31 | 34‍–‍40 | 34‍–‍42 |
| St. Louis Browns | 67 | 85 | .441 | 33 | 36‍–‍39 | 31‍–‍46 |
| Washington Senators | 66 | 86 | .434 | 34 | 34‍–‍40 | 32‍–‍46 |
| Chicago White Sox | 53 | 99 | .349 | 47 | 29‍–‍46 | 24‍–‍53 |

=== Record vs. opponents ===
1934 American League record Sources:
| Team | BOS | CWS | CLE | DET | NYY | PHA | SLB | WSH |
|---|---|---|---|---|---|---|---|---|
| Boston | — | 11–10 | 7–15 | 8–14 | 10–12 | 12–9 | 14–8 | 14–8–1 |
| Chicago | 10–11 | — | 8–14 | 5–17 | 5–17 | 9–13 | 7–14–1 | 9–13 |
| Cleveland | 15–7 | 14–8 | — | 6–16 | 11–11 | 13–9 | 15–7 | 11–11 |
| Detroit | 14–8 | 17–5 | 16–6 | — | 12–10 | 12–10 | 15–7 | 15–7 |
| New York | 12–10 | 17–5 | 11–11 | 10–12 | — | 15–7 | 17–5 | 12–10 |
| Philadelphia | 9–12 | 13–9 | 9–13 | 10–12 | 7–15 | — | 9–12–1 | 11–9–2 |
| St. Louis | 8–14 | 14–7–1 | 7–15 | 7–15 | 5–17 | 12–9–1 | — | 14–8 |
| Washington | 8–14–1 | 13–9 | 11–11 | 7–15 | 10–12 | 9–11–2 | 8–14 | — |

=== Roster ===
1934 St. Louis Browns
Roster
| Pitchers: 18 Ivy Andrews; 12 George Blaeholder; 16 Dick Coffman; 17 Bump Hadley; 24 Jack Knott; 20 Bill McAfee; 25 Lefty Mills; 21 Bobo Newsom; -- Jim Walkup; 23 Jim Weaver; 19 Ed Wells | Catchers: 9 Frank Grube; 27 Grover Hartley; 10 Rollie Hemsley; Infielders: 22 Ollie Bejma; 2 Jack Burns; 7 Harlond Clift; 11 Rogers Hornsby; 5 Ski Melillo; 1 Alan Strange | Outfielders: 3 Bruce Campbell; 14 Earl Clark; 15 Debs Garms; 8 Ray Pepper; 4 George Puccinelli; 6 Sam West; Other batters: 26 Charley O'Leary; -- Art Scharein | Manager: 11 Rogers Hornsby; Coaches: 27 Grover Hartley; 26 Charley O'Leary |

== Player stats ==
=== Batting ===
==== Starters by position ====
Note: Pos = Position; G = Games played; AB = At bats; H = Hits; Avg. = Batting average; HR = Home runs; RBI = Runs batted in

| Pos | Player | G | AB | H | Avg. | HR | RBI |
|---|---|---|---|---|---|---|---|
| C | Rollie Hemsley | 123 | 431 | 133 | .309 | 2 | 52 |
| 1B | Jack Burns | 154 | 612 | 157 | .257 | 13 | 73 |
| 2B | Ski Melillo | 144 | 552 | 133 | .241 | 2 | 55 |
| 3B | Harlond Clift | 147 | 572 | 149 | .260 | 14 | 56 |
| SS | Alan Strange | 127 | 430 | 100 | .233 | 1 | 45 |
| OF | Ray Pepper | 148 | 564 | 168 | .298 | 7 | 101 |
| OF | Bruce Campbell | 138 | 481 | 134 | .279 | 9 | 74 |
| OF | Sam West | 122 | 482 | 157 | .326 | 9 | 55 |

==== Other batters ====
Note: G = Games played; AB = At bats; H = Hits; Avg. = Batting average; HR = Home runs; RBI = Runs batted in

| Player | G | AB | H | Avg. | HR | RBI |
|---|---|---|---|---|---|---|
| Ollie Bejma | 95 | 262 | 71 | .271 | 2 | 29 |
| Debs Garms | 91 | 232 | 68 | .293 | 0 | 31 |
| Frank Grube | 65 | 170 | 49 | .288 | 0 | 11 |
| Earl Clark | 13 | 41 | 7 | .171 | 0 | 1 |
| George Puccinelli | 10 | 26 | 6 | .231 | 2 | 5 |
| Rogers Hornsby | 24 | 23 | 7 | .304 | 1 | 11 |
| Grover Hartley | 5 | 3 | 1 | .333 | 0 | 0 |
| Art Scharein | 1 | 2 | 1 | .000 | 0 | 2 |
| Charley O'Leary | 1 | 1 | 1 | 1.000 | 0 | 0 |

=== Pitching ===
==== Starting pitchers ====
Note: G = Games pitched; IP = Innings pitched; W = Wins; L = Losses; ERA = Earned run average; SO = Strikeouts

| Player | G | IP | W | L | ERA | SO |
|---|---|---|---|---|---|---|
| Bobo Newsom | 47 | 262.1 | 16 | 20 | 4.01 | 135 |
| George Blaeholder | 39 | 234.1 | 14 | 18 | 4.22 | 66 |
| Bump Hadley | 39 | 213.0 | 10 | 16 | 4.35 | 79 |
| Jim Weaver | 5 | 19.2 | 2 | 0 | 6.41 | 11 |

==== Other pitchers ====
Note: G = Games pitched; IP = Innings pitched; W = Wins; L = Losses; ERA = Earned run average; SO = Strikeouts

| Player | G | IP | W | L | ERA | SO |
|---|---|---|---|---|---|---|
| Dick Coffman | 40 | 173.0 | 9 | 10 | 4.53 | 55 |
| Ivy Andrews | 43 | 139.0 | 4 | 11 | 4.66 | 51 |
| Jack Knott | 45 | 138.0 | 10 | 3 | 4.96 | 56 |
| Ed Wells | 33 | 92.0 | 1 | 7 | 4.79 | 27 |

==== Relief pitchers ====
Note: G = Games pitched; W = Wins; L = Losses; SV = Saves; ERA = Earned run average; SO = Strikeouts

| Player | G | W | L | SV | ERA | SO |
|---|---|---|---|---|---|---|
| Bill McAfee | 28 | 1 | 0 | 0 | 5.84 | 11 |
| Lefty Mills | 4 | 0 | 0 | 0 | 4.15 | 2 |
| Jim Walkup | 3 | 0 | 0 | 0 | 2.16 | 6 |

== Farm system ==
| Level | Team | League | Manager |
|---|---|---|---|
| A | San Antonio Missions | Texas League | Hank Severeid |
