= 1934 Cleveland Indians season =

1934 Cleveland Indians
- League: American League
- Ballpark: League Park
- City: Cleveland, Ohio
- Owners: Alva Bradley
- General managers: Billy Evans
- Managers: Walter Johnson
- Radio: WHK (Jack Graney)

The 1934 Cleveland Indians season was a season in American baseball. The team finished third in the American League with a record of 85–69, 16 games behind the Detroit Tigers.

== Regular season ==
Pitcher Mel Harder became the first pitcher in the American League to win 20 games in one season while wearing glasses.

=== Season standings ===
American League
| Team | W | L | Pct. | GB | Home | Road |
|---|---|---|---|---|---|---|
| Detroit Tigers | 101 | 53 | .656 | — | 54‍–‍26 | 47‍–‍27 |
| New York Yankees | 94 | 60 | .610 | 7 | 53‍–‍24 | 41‍–‍36 |
| Cleveland Indians | 85 | 69 | .552 | 16 | 47‍–‍31 | 38‍–‍38 |
| Boston Red Sox | 76 | 76 | .500 | 24 | 42‍–‍35 | 34‍–‍41 |
| Philadelphia Athletics | 68 | 82 | .453 | 31 | 34‍–‍40 | 34‍–‍42 |
| St. Louis Browns | 67 | 85 | .441 | 33 | 36‍–‍39 | 31‍–‍46 |
| Washington Senators | 66 | 86 | .434 | 34 | 34‍–‍40 | 32‍–‍46 |
| Chicago White Sox | 53 | 99 | .349 | 47 | 29‍–‍46 | 24‍–‍53 |

=== Record vs. opponents ===
1934 American League record Sources:
| Team | BOS | CWS | CLE | DET | NYY | PHA | SLB | WSH |
|---|---|---|---|---|---|---|---|---|
| Boston | — | 11–10 | 7–15 | 8–14 | 10–12 | 12–9 | 14–8 | 14–8–1 |
| Chicago | 10–11 | — | 8–14 | 5–17 | 5–17 | 9–13 | 7–14–1 | 9–13 |
| Cleveland | 15–7 | 14–8 | — | 6–16 | 11–11 | 13–9 | 15–7 | 11–11 |
| Detroit | 14–8 | 17–5 | 16–6 | — | 12–10 | 12–10 | 15–7 | 15–7 |
| New York | 12–10 | 17–5 | 11–11 | 10–12 | — | 15–7 | 17–5 | 12–10 |
| Philadelphia | 9–12 | 13–9 | 9–13 | 10–12 | 7–15 | — | 9–12–1 | 11–9–2 |
| St. Louis | 8–14 | 14–7–1 | 7–15 | 7–15 | 5–17 | 12–9–1 | — | 14–8 |
| Washington | 8–14–1 | 13–9 | 11–11 | 7–15 | 10–12 | 9–11–2 | 8–14 | — |

=== Roster ===
1934 Cleveland Indians
Roster
| Pitchers: 17 Belve Bean; 16 Clint Brown; 21 Lloyd Brown; 15 Sarge Connally; 24 Denny Galehouse; 18 Mel Harder; 19 Oral Hildebrand; 12 Willis Hudlin; 22 Thornton Lee; 33 Monte Pearson; -- Bill Perrin; 14 Bob Weiland; 23 Ralph Winegarner | Catchers: 31 Moe Berg; 8 Bill Brenzel; 9 Bob Garbark; 9 Glenn Myatt; 11 Frankie Pytlak; 8 Roy Spencer; Infielders: 1 Johnny Burnett; 34 Odell Hale; 5 Willie Kamm; 4 Bill Knickerbocker; 26 Eddie Moore; 7 Hal Trosky | Outfielders: 3 Earl Averill; 26 Kit Carson; 35 Milt Galatzer; 35 Dutch Holland; 2 Dick Porter; 29 Sam Rice; 2 Bob Seeds; 6 Joe Vosmik | Manager: 10 Walter Johnson; Coaches: 20 Patsy Gharrity; -- Earl Wolgamot |

== Player stats ==
=== Batting ===
==== Starters by position ====
Note: Pos = Position; G = Games played; AB = At bats; H = Hits; Avg. = Batting average; HR = Home runs; RBI = Runs batted in

| Pos | Player | G | AB | H | Avg. | HR | RBI |
|---|---|---|---|---|---|---|---|
| C | Frankie Pytlak | 91 | 289 | 75 | .260 | 0 | 35 |
| 1B | Hal Trosky | 154 | 625 | 206 | .330 | 35 | 142 |
| 2B | Odell Hale | 143 | 563 | 170 | .302 | 13 | 101 |
| SS | Bill Knickerbocker | 146 | 593 | 188 | .317 | 4 | 67 |
| 3B | Willie Kamm | 121 | 386 | 104 | .269 | 0 | 42 |
| OF | Earl Averill | 154 | 598 | 187 | .313 | 31 | 113 |
| OF | Joe Vosmik | 104 | 405 | 138 | .341 | 6 | 78 |
| OF | Sam Rice | 97 | 335 | 98 | .293 | 1 | 33 |

==== Other batters ====
Note: G = Games played; AB = At bats; H = Hits; Avg. = Batting average; HR = Home runs; RBI = Runs batted in

| Player | G | AB | H | Avg. | HR | RBI |
|---|---|---|---|---|---|---|
| Johnny Burnett | 72 | 208 | 61 | .293 | 3 | 30 |
| Milt Galatzer | 49 | 196 | 53 | .270 | 0 | 15 |
| Bob Seeds | 61 | 186 | 46 | .247 | 0 | 18 |
| Dutch Holland | 50 | 128 | 32 | .250 | 2 | 13 |
| Glenn Myatt | 36 | 107 | 34 | .318 | 0 | 12 |
| Moe Berg | 29 | 97 | 25 | .258 | 0 | 9 |
| Eddie Moore | 27 | 65 | 10 | .154 | 0 | 8 |
| Bill Brenzel | 15 | 51 | 11 | .216 | 0 | 3 |
| Dick Porter | 14 | 45 | 10 | .222 | 1 | 6 |
| Kit Carson | 5 | 18 | 5 | .278 | 0 | 1 |
| Bob Garbark | 5 | 11 | 0 | .000 | 0 | 0 |
| Roy Spencer | 5 | 7 | 1 | .143 | 0 | 2 |

=== Pitching ===
==== Starting pitchers ====
Note: G = Games pitched; IP = Innings pitched; W = Wins; L = Losses; ERA = Earned run average; SO = Strikeouts

| Player | G | IP | W | L | ERA | SO |
|---|---|---|---|---|---|---|
| Mel Harder | 44 | 255.1 | 20 | 12 | 2.61 | 91 |
| Monte Pearson | 39 | 254.2 | 18 | 13 | 4.52 | 140 |
| Oral Hildebrand | 33 | 198.0 | 11 | 9 | 4.50 | 72 |
| Willis Hudlin | 36 | 195.0 | 15 | 10 | 4.75 | 58 |

==== Other pitchers ====
Note: G = Games pitched; IP = Innings pitched; W = Wins; L = Losses; ERA = Earned run average; SO = Strikeouts

| Player | G | IP | W | L | ERA | SO |
|---|---|---|---|---|---|---|
| Bob Weiland | 16 | 70.0 | 1 | 5 | 4.11 | 42 |
| Sarge Connally | 5 | 5.1 | 0 | 0 | 5.06 | 1 |
| Bill Perrin | 1 | 5.0 | 0 | 1 | 14.40 | 3 |
| Denny Galehouse | 1 | 1.0 | 0 | 0 | 18.00 | 0 |

==== Relief pitchers ====
Note: G = Games pitched; W = Wins; L = Losses; SV = Saves; ERA = Earned run average; SO = Strikeouts

| Player | G | W | L | SV | ERA | SO |
|---|---|---|---|---|---|---|
| Lloyd Brown | 38 | 5 | 10 | 7 | 3.85 | 39 |
| Thornton Lee | 24 | 1 | 1 | 0 | 5.04 | 41 |
| Ralph Winegarner | 22 | 5 | 4 | 0 | 5.51 | 32 |
| Belve Bean | 21 | 5 | 1 | 0 | 3.86 | 20 |
| Clint Brown | 17 | 4 | 3 | 1 | 5.90 | 15 |

== Awards and honors ==
All Star Game

Earl Averill, outfielder

Mel Harder, pitcher

== Farm system ==
| Level | Team | League | Manager |
|---|---|---|---|
| A | New Orleans Pelicans | Southern Association | Larry Gilbert |
| C | Zanesville Grays | Middle Atlantic League | Harry Layne, Bert Grimm and Earl Wolgamot |
| D | Monessen Indians | Pennsylvania State Association | Eddie Onslow, Bill Ward, Earl Wolgamot and Walt Laskowski |

LEAGUE CHAMPIONS: New Orleans, Zanesville
