= 1934 New York Yankees season =

Season for the Major League Baseball team the New York Yankees

1934 New York Yankees
- League: American League
- Ballpark: Yankee Stadium
- City: New York City
- Record: 94–60 (.610)
- League place: 2nd
- Owners: Jacob Ruppert
- General managers: Ed Barrow
- Managers: Joe McCarthy

The 1934 New York Yankees season was the team's 32nd season. The team finished with a record of 94–60, finishing 7 games behind the Detroit Tigers. New York was managed by Joe McCarthy. The Yankees played their home games at Yankee Stadium. This was the final year Babe Ruth played as a Yankee. Lou Gehrig won the American League Triple Crown this season.

== Regular season ==
The 1934 season was Babe Ruth's last season in a Yankee uniform. He was released the following February.

=== Season standings ===
American League
| Team | W | L | Pct. | GB | Home | Road |
|---|---|---|---|---|---|---|
| Detroit Tigers | 101 | 53 | .656 | — | 54‍–‍26 | 47‍–‍27 |
| New York Yankees | 94 | 60 | .610 | 7 | 53‍–‍24 | 41‍–‍36 |
| Cleveland Indians | 85 | 69 | .552 | 16 | 47‍–‍31 | 38‍–‍38 |
| Boston Red Sox | 76 | 76 | .500 | 24 | 42‍–‍35 | 34‍–‍41 |
| Philadelphia Athletics | 68 | 82 | .453 | 31 | 34‍–‍40 | 34‍–‍42 |
| St. Louis Browns | 67 | 85 | .441 | 33 | 36‍–‍39 | 31‍–‍46 |
| Washington Senators | 66 | 86 | .434 | 34 | 34‍–‍40 | 32‍–‍46 |
| Chicago White Sox | 53 | 99 | .349 | 47 | 29‍–‍46 | 24‍–‍53 |

=== Record vs. opponents ===
1934 American League record Sources:
| Team | BOS | CWS | CLE | DET | NYY | PHA | SLB | WSH |
|---|---|---|---|---|---|---|---|---|
| Boston | — | 11–10 | 7–15 | 8–14 | 10–12 | 12–9 | 14–8 | 14–8–1 |
| Chicago | 10–11 | — | 8–14 | 5–17 | 5–17 | 9–13 | 7–14–1 | 9–13 |
| Cleveland | 15–7 | 14–8 | — | 6–16 | 11–11 | 13–9 | 15–7 | 11–11 |
| Detroit | 14–8 | 17–5 | 16–6 | — | 12–10 | 12–10 | 15–7 | 15–7 |
| New York | 12–10 | 17–5 | 11–11 | 10–12 | — | 15–7 | 17–5 | 12–10 |
| Philadelphia | 9–12 | 13–9 | 9–13 | 10–12 | 7–15 | — | 9–12–1 | 11–9–2 |
| St. Louis | 8–14 | 14–7–1 | 7–15 | 7–15 | 5–17 | 12–9–1 | — | 14–8 |
| Washington | 8–14–1 | 13–9 | 11–11 | 7–15 | 10–12 | 9–11–2 | 8–14 | — |

=== Roster ===
1934 New York Yankees
Roster
| Pitchers: 18 Johnny Allen; 21,22,26 Johnny Broaca; 16 Jimmie DeShong; 24,33 Charlie Devens; 11 Lefty Gomez; 20 Burleigh Grimes; 17 Danny MacFayden; 19 Johnny Murphy; 20 Floyd Newkirk; 15 Red Ruffing; 20 Harry Smythe; 22,24 Vito Tamulis; 26 George Uhle; 14 Russ Van Atta | Catchers: 8 Bill Dickey; 9 Arndt Jorgens; 27 Zack Taylor; Infielders: 5 Frankie Crosetti; 4 Lou Gehrig; 10 Don Heffner; 22 Lyn Lary; 6 Tony Lazzeri; 2 Red Rolfe; 12 Jack Saltzgaver | Outfielders: 25 Sammy Byrd; 7 Ben Chapman; 1 Earle Combs; 28 Myril Hoag; 3 Babe Ruth; 1 George Selkirk; 27 Dixie Walker | Manager: -- Joe McCarthy; Coaches: 29 Art Fletcher; 21 Johnny Schulte; 30 Joe Sewell |

== Player stats ==
=== Batting ===
==== Starters by position ====
Note: Pos = Position; G = Games played; AB = At bats; H = Hits; Avg. = Batting average; HR = Home runs; RBI = Runs batted in

| Pos | Player | G | AB | H | Avg. | HR | RBI |
|---|---|---|---|---|---|---|---|
| C | Bill Dickey | 104 | 395 | 127 | .322 | 12 | 72 |
| 1B | Lou Gehrig | 154 | 579 | 210 | .363 | 49 | 166 |
| 2B | Tony Lazzeri | 123 | 438 | 117 | .267 | 14 | 67 |
| 3B | Jack Saltzgaver | 94 | 350 | 95 | .271 | 6 | 36 |
| SS | Frankie Crosetti | 138 | 554 | 147 | .265 | 11 | 67 |
| OF | Ben Chapman | 149 | 588 | 181 | .308 | 5 | 86 |
| OF | Babe Ruth | 125 | 365 | 105 | .288 | 22 | 84 |
| OF | Sammy Byrd | 106 | 191 | 47 | .246 | 3 | 23 |

==== Other batters ====
Note: G = Games played; AB = At bats; H = Hits; Avg. = Batting average; HR = Home runs; RBI = Runs batted in

| Player | G | AB | H | Avg. | HR | RBI |
|---|---|---|---|---|---|---|
| Red Rolfe | 89 | 279 | 80 | .287 | 0 | 18 |
| Earle Combs | 63 | 251 | 80 | .319 | 2 | 25 |
| Don Heffner | 72 | 241 | 63 | .261 | 0 | 25 |
| Samuel Byrd | 106 | 191 | 47 | .246 | 3 | 23 |
| Arndt Jorgens | 58 | 183 | 38 | .208 | 0 | 20 |
| George Selkirk | 46 | 176 | 55 | .313 | 5 | 38 |
| Dixie Walker | 17 | 17 | 2 | .118 | 0 | 0 |
| Zack Taylor | 4 | 7 | 1 | .143 | 0 | 0 |
| Lyn Lary | 1 | 0 | 0 | ---- | 0 | 0 |

=== Pitching ===
==== Starting pitchers ====
Note: G = Games pitched; IP = Innings pitched; W = Wins; L = Losses; ERA = Earned run average; SO = Strikeouts

| Player | G | IP | W | L | ERA | SO |
|---|---|---|---|---|---|---|
| Lefty Gomez | 38 | 281.2 | 26 | 5 | 2.33 | 158 |
| Red Ruffing | 36 | 256.1 | 19 | 11 | 3.93 | 149 |
| Johnny Broaca | 26 | 177.1 | 12 | 9 | 4.16 | 74 |
| Johnny Allen | 13 | 71.2 | 5 | 2 | 2.89 | 54 |
| Charlie Devens | 1 | 11.0 | 1 | 0 | 1.64 | 4 |
| Vito Tamulis | 1 | 9.0 | 1 | 0 | 0.00 | 5 |

==== Other pitchers ====
Note: G = Games pitched; IP = Innings pitched; W = Wins; L = Losses; ERA = Earned run average; SO = Strikeouts

| Player | G | IP | W | L | ERA | SO |
|---|---|---|---|---|---|---|
| Johnny Murphy | 40 | 207.2 | 14 | 10 | 3.12 | 70 |
| Jimmie DeShong | 31 | 133.2 | 6 | 7 | 4.11 | 40 |
| Danny MacFayden | 22 | 96.0 | 4 | 3 | 4.50 | 41 |
| Russ Van Atta | 28 | 88.0 | 3 | 5 | 6.34 | 39 |
| George Uhle | 10 | 16.1 | 2 | 4 | 9.92 | 10 |

==== Relief pitchers ====
Note: G = Games pitched; W = Wins; L = Losses; SV = Saves; ERA = Earned run average; SO = Strikeouts

| Player | G | W | L | SV | ERA | SO |
|---|---|---|---|---|---|---|
| Burleigh Grimes | 10 | 1 | 2 | 1 | 5.50 | 5 |
| Harry Smythe | 8 | 0 | 2 | 1 | 7.80 | 7 |
| Floyd Newkirk | 1 | 0 | 0 | 0 | 0.00 | 0 |

== Awards and honors ==
- Lou Gehrig won the Triple Crown.

== Farm system ==
| Level | Team | League | Manager |
|---|---|---|---|
| AA | Newark Bears | International League | Bob Shawkey |
| A | Binghamton Triplets | New York–Pennsylvania League | Billy Meyer |
| B | Norfolk Tars | Piedmont League | Bill Skiff |
| C | Wheeling Stogies | Middle Atlantic League | Jack Sheehan |
| D | Washington Generals | Pennsylvania State Association | Benny Bengough |

LEAGUE CHAMPION: Norfolk
