= 1934 Boston Red Sox season =

Major League Baseball season

1934 Boston Red Sox
- League: American League
- Ballpark: Fenway Park
- City: Boston, Massachusetts
- Record: 76–76 (.500)
- League place: 4th
- Owners: Tom Yawkey
- President: Tom Yawkey
- General managers: Eddie Collins
- Managers: Bucky Harris
- Radio: WNAC (Fred Hoey)
- Stats: ESPN.com; Baseball Reference

The 1934 Boston Red Sox season was the 34th season in the franchise's Major League Baseball history. The Red Sox finished fourth in the American League (AL) with a record of 76 wins and 76 losses, 24 games behind the Detroit Tigers.

On January 5, 1934, during renovation work at Fenway Park—including the removal of Duffy's Cliff, an embankment in front of the Green Monster—a fire that started at the ballpark caused significant damage and spread to some nearby buildings on Lansdowne Street. Further repair and renovation work, costing over $1 million, was completed in time for Opening Day.

== Offseason ==
- December 12, 1933: Bob Kline, Rabbit Warstler, and $125,000 were traded by the Red Sox to the Philadelphia Athletics for Lefty Grove, Max Bishop and Rube Walberg.

== Regular season ==
In May, pitcher Wes Ferrell, the brother of catcher Rick Ferrell, was acquired for the Red Sox from the Cleveland Indians.

=== Season standings ===
American League
Team	W	L	Pct.	GB	Home	Road
Detroit Tigers	101	53	.656	—	54‍–‍26	47‍–‍27
New York Yankees	94	60	.610	7	53‍–‍24	41‍–‍36
Cleveland Indians	85	69	.552	16	47‍–‍31	38‍–‍38
Boston Red Sox	76	76	.500	24	42‍–‍35	34‍–‍41
Philadelphia Athletics	68	82	.453	31	34‍–‍40	34‍–‍42
St. Louis Browns	67	85	.441	33	36‍–‍39	31‍–‍46
Washington Senators	66	86	.434	34	34‍–‍40	32‍–‍46
Chicago White Sox	53	99	.349	47	29‍–‍46	24‍–‍53

=== Record vs. opponents ===
1934 American League record Sources:
Team	BOS	CWS	CLE	DET	NYY	PHA	SLB	WSH
Boston	—	11–10	7–15	8–14	10–12	12–9	14–8	14–8–1
Chicago	10–11	—	8–14	5–17	5–17	9–13	7–14–1	9–13
Cleveland	15–7	14–8	—	6–16	11–11	13–9	15–7	11–11
Detroit	14–8	17–5	16–6	—	12–10	12–10	15–7	15–7
New York	12–10	17–5	11–11	10–12	—	15–7	17–5	12–10
Philadelphia	9–12	13–9	9–13	10–12	7–15	—	9–12–1	11–9–2
St. Louis	8–14	14–7–1	7–15	7–15	5–17	12–9–1	—	14–8
Washington	8–14–1	13–9	11–11	7–15	10–12	9–11–2	8–14	—

=== Opening Day lineup ===
1	Chalmer Cissell	2B
20	Lyn Lary	SS
25	Eddie Morgan	1B
4	Roy Johnson	LF
5	Carl Reynolds	CF
7	Rick Ferrell	C
22	Dick Porter	RF
8	Billy Werber	3B
11	Gordon Rhodes	P

=== Roster ===
1934 Boston Red Sox
Roster
Pitchers: 12 Wes Ferrell; 10 Lefty Grove; -- George Hockette; 16 Hank Johnson; -- Spike Merena; 14 Joe Mulligan; 19 Fritz Ostermueller; 17 Herb Pennock; 14 George Pipgras; 11 Gordon Rhodes; 15 Rube Walberg; 12 Bob Weiland; 18 Johnny Welch	Catchers: 7 Rick Ferrell; 9 Gordie Hinkle; 24 Lou Legett; Infielders: 1 Max Bishop; 2 Bill Cissell; 25 Joe Judge; 8 Red Kellett; 21 Lyn Lary; 3 Ed Morgan; 23 Freddie Muller; -- Al Niemiec; 8 Bucky Walters; 20 Billy Werber	Outfielders: -- Mel Almada; 6 Dusty Cooke; -- Skinny Graham; 4 Roy Johnson; 23 Dick Porter; 5 Carl Reynolds; 23 Bob Seeds; 22 Moose Solters	Manager: 27 Bucky Harris; Coaches: 30 Tom Daly; 28 Bibb Falk; 26 Jack Onslow (Pitching)

== Player stats ==
=== Batting ===
==== Starters by position ====
Note: Pos = Position; G = Games played; AB = At bats; H = Hits; Avg. = Batting average; HR = Home runs; RBI = Runs batted in

Pos	Player	G	AB	H	Avg.	HR	RBI
C	Rick Ferrell	132	437	130	.297	1	48
1B	Ed Morgan	138	528	141	.267	3	79
2B	Bill Cissell	102	416	111	.267	4	44
3B	Billy Werber	152	623	200	.321	11	67
SS	Lyn Lary	129	419	101	.241	2	54
OF	Roy Johnson	143	569	182	.320	7	119
OF	Carl Reynolds	113	413	125	.303	4	86
OF	Moose Solters	101	365	109	.299	7	58

==== Other batters ====
Note: G = Games played; AB = At bats; H = Hits; Avg. = Batting average; HR = Home runs; RBI = Runs batted in

Player	G	AB	H	Avg.	HR	RBI
Dick Porter	79	264	80	.303	0	56
Max Bishop	97	253	66	.261	1	22
Dusty Cooke	74	168	41	.244	1	26
Mel Almada	23	90	21	.233	0	10
Bucky Walters	23	88	19	.216	4	18
Gordie Hinkle	27	75	13	.173	0	9
Skinny Graham	13	47	11	.234	0	3
Lou Legett	19	38	11	.289	0	1
Al Niemiec	9	32	7	.219	0	3
Joe Judge	10	15	5	.333	0	2
Red Kellett	9	9	0	.000	0	0
Bob Seeds	8	6	1	.167	0	1
Freddie Muller	2	1	0	.000	0	0

=== Pitching ===
==== Starting pitchers ====
Note: G = Games pitched; IP = Innings pitched; W = Wins; L = Losses; ERA = Earned run average; SO = Strikeouts

Player	G	IP	W	L	ERA	SO
Gordon Rhodes	44	219.0	12	12	4.56	79
Fritz Ostermueller	33	198.2	10	13	3.49	75
Wes Ferrell	26	181.0	14	5	3.63	87
George Hockette	3	27.1	2	1	1.65	14
Spike Merena	4	24.2	1	2	2.92	7

==== Other pitchers ====
Note: G = Games pitched; IP = Innings pitched; W = Wins; L = Losses; ERA = Earned run average; SO = Strikeouts

Player	G	IP	W	L	ERA	SO
Johnny Welch	41	206.1	13	15	4.49	91
Hank Johnson	31	124.1	6	8	5.36	66
Lefty Grove	22	109.1	8	8	6.50	43
Rube Walberg	30	104.2	6	7	4.04	38
Bob Weiland	11	55.2	1	5	5.50	29
George Pipgras	2	3.1	0	0	8.10	0

==== Relief pitchers ====
Note: G = Games pitched; W = Wins; L = Losses; SV = Saves; ERA = Earned run average; SO = Strikeouts

Player	G	W	L	SV	ERA	SO
Herb Pennock	30	2	0	1	3.05	16
Joe Mulligan	14	1	0	0	3.63	13

== Farm system ==
Level	Team	League	Manager
AA	Kansas City Blues	American Association	Roger Peckinpaugh
A	Reading Red Sox	New York–Pennsylvania League	Nemo Leibold
B	Columbia Sandlappers/Asheville Tourists	Piedmont League	Bill Laval and Possum Whitted
C	Joplin Miners	Western Association	Wally Schang

Columbia franchise transferred and renamed, June 7, 1934
