= Jack Saltzgaver =

American baseball player (1903–1978)

- Third baseman / Second baseman
- Born: January 23, 1903; Croton, Iowa, U.S.
- Died: February 1, 1978 (aged 75); Keokuk, Iowa, U.S.
- Batted: Left Threw: Right

MLB debut
- April 12, 1932, for the New York Yankees

Last MLB appearance
- September 30, 1945, for the Pittsburgh Pirates

MLB statistics
- Batting average: .260
- Home runs: 10
- Runs batted in: 82
- Stats at Baseball Reference

Teams
- New York Yankees (1932, 1934–1937); Pittsburgh Pirates (1945)

Otto Hamlin "Jack" Saltzgaver (January 23, 1903 – February 1, 1978) was an American professional baseball player. The native of Croton, Iowa, as an infielder, appeared in 278 Major League Baseball games for the New York Yankees (1932; 1934–1937) and the Pittsburgh Pirates (1945).

Saltzgaver batted left-handed, threw right-handed, stood 5 feet 11 inches (180 cm) tall and weighed 165 pounds (75 kg; 11.8 st). His best MLB season came with the 1934 Yankees. At age 31, he was the Bombers' most-used third baseman, appearing in 84 games at the position. He batted a career-high .271 and set personal bests in home runs (6) and runs batted in (36). The following year, he was supplanted by Red Rolfe as the Yanks' starter at the hot corner.

At the time he played for the Pirates, during the last season of the World War II manpower shortage, the 42-year-old Saltzgaver was the oldest active Major League player.

In 278 games over six seasons, Saltzgaver posted a .260 batting average (199-for-764) with 131 runs, 10 home runs, 82 RBI and 105 bases on balls. He recorded a .957 fielding percentage playing at third, second and first base.
