= Prospect (sports) =

Type of sport player

In sports, a prospect, also known as a "minor leaguer" or "farmhand," is any player whose rights are owned by a professional team, but who has yet to surpass a threshold where they achieve rookie status (as defined by their respective league), or is not established with the team yet. Prospects can sometimes be assigned to farm teams, or loaned to lower ranked teams. They may also decide to go back to college to play.

Major-league professional sports teams also trade prospects, by themselves, with draft picks, or with current major-leaguers, in order to acquire another prospect or an established major league player. Teams that trade away several of their star players for other teams' prospects are sometimes said to be having a fire sale.

== Ice hockey ==
=== North America ===
A North American ice hockey prospect is typically a player who was drafted and/or signed by a National Hockey League team, and is assigned to a development farm team. These development leagues are the American Hockey League and the ECHL. Besides these minor leagues, draft picks may continue playing for the team that they were drafted from in the Canadian Hockey League (consisting of the Ontario Hockey League, Quebec Maritimes Junior Hockey League, and Western Hockey League), the NCAA, the United States Hockey League, or various European leagues such as the Czech Extraliga, Finnish Liiga, German Deutsche Eishockey Liga, Russian Kontinental Hockey League, Slovak Extraliga, Swedish Hockey League, or Swiss National League.

== See also ==
- College recruiting
