= Elmer Klumpp =

American baseball player (1906-1996)

- Catcher
- Born: August 26, 1906; St. Louis, Missouri, U.S.
- Died: October 18, 1996 (aged 90); Menomonee Falls, Wisconsin, U.S.
- Batted: Right Threw: Right

MLB debut
- April 17, 1934, for the Washington Senators

Last MLB appearance
- May 3, 1937, for the Brooklyn Dodgers

MLB statistics
- Batting average: .115
- Home runs: 0
- RBI: 2
- Stats at Baseball Reference

Teams
- Washington Senators (1934); Brooklyn Dodgers (1937)

Elmer Edward Klumpp (August 26, 1906 – October 18, 1996) was an American catcher in Major League Baseball. He played for the Washington Senators in 1934 and the Brooklyn Dodgers in 1937.
