= Reese Diggs =

American baseball player (1915-1978)

- Pitcher
- Born: September 22, 1915; Mathews, Virginia
- Died: October 30, 1978 (aged 63); Baltimore, Maryland
- Batted: Both Threw: Right

MLB debut
- September 15, 1934, for the Washington Senators

Last MLB appearance
- September 29, 1934, for the Washington Senators

MLB statistics
- Win–loss record: 1-2
- Earned run average: 6.75
- Strikeouts: 2
- Stats at Baseball Reference

Teams
- Washington Senators (1934)

Reese Wilson "Diggsy" Diggs (September 22, 1915 – October 30, 1978) was a Major League Baseball pitcher who played in four games for the Washington Senators in 1934.
