= Allen Benson =

American baseball player (1905-1999)

- Pitcher
- Born: March 28, 1905; Hurley, South Dakota, U.S.
- Died: November 16, 1999 (aged 94); Viborg, South Dakota, U.S.
- Batted: Right Threw: Right

MLB debut
- August 19, 1934, for the Washington Senators

Last MLB appearance
- August 26, 1934, for the Washington Senators

MLB statistics
- Win–loss record: 0–1
- Earned run average: 12.10
- Strikeouts: 4
- Stats at Baseball Reference

Teams
- Washington Senators (1934)

Allen Wilbert Benson (March 28, 1905 – November 16, 1999), nicknamed "Bullet", was an American professional baseball player who played pitcher in the Major Leagues in 1934. He would play for the Washington Senators.

Benson played for the bearded House of David baseball team before signing with the Senators. Given the rarity of facial hair among the era's baseball players, the Senators signed Benson largely as a publicity stunt to boost attendance. He became one of very few Major League players who wore facial hair between the deadball era and the 1970s. He struggled in two games and was sent to the minor league Albany Senators. He told reporters "I believe I could have made the grade with the Nats but for these danged whiskers."
