= Harry Smythe =

American baseball player (1904–1980)

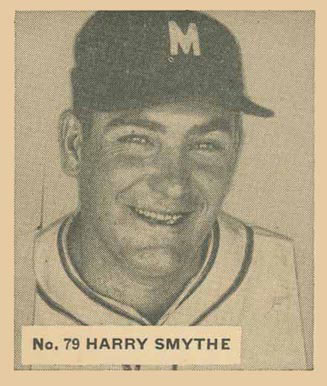
- Pitcher
- Born: October 24, 1904; Augusta, Georgia, U.S.
- Died: August 28, 1980 (aged 75); Augusta, Georgia, U.S.
- Batted: Left Threw: Left

MLB debut
- July 21, 1929, for the Philadelphia Phillies

Last MLB appearance
- June 26, 1934, for the Brooklyn Dodgers

MLB statistics
- Win–loss record: 5–12
- Earned run average: 6.40
- Strikeouts: 33
- Stats at Baseball Reference

Teams
- Philadelphia Phillies (1929–1930); New York Yankees (1934); Brooklyn Dodgers (1934)

William Henry Smythe (October 24, 1904 – August 28, 1980) was an American pitcher in Major League Baseball. He pitched from 1929 to 1934.

Smythe later managed the Montreal Royals in the International League for part of the 1936 season.
