= Mort Flohr =

American baseball player (1911-1994)

- Pitcher
- Born: August 15, 1911; Canisteo, New York, U.S.
- Died: June 2, 1994 (aged 82); Hornell, New York, U.S.
- Batted: Left Threw: Left

MLB debut
- June 8, 1934, for the Philadelphia Athletics

Last MLB appearance
- September 14, 1934, for the Philadelphia Athletics

MLB statistics
- Win–loss record: 0–2
- Earned run average: 5.87
- Strikeouts: 6
- Stats at Baseball Reference

Teams
- Philadelphia Athletics (1934)

Moritz Herman Flohr ( August 15, 1911 – June 2, 1994) was an American Major League Baseball pitcher. Nicknamed "Dutch" or "Mort", he played for the Philadelphia Athletics during the 1934 season.

== Early life ==
Moritz Flohr was born on August 15th, 1911 in Canisteo, a small town in upstate New York. He attended Duke University in Durham, North Carolina from 1929 to 1933, where he played baseball as a left-handed pitcher under coach Jack Coombs. Coombs had pitched for the Philadelphia Athletics under manager Connie Mack, so it was no surprise when Flohr, his protege, was drafted by Mack for the major-league baseball team, fresh out of college, in 1934.

== Career ==
Moritz Flohr joined the Philadelphia Athletics, known as the "As", alongside pitchers Tim McKeithan, Bobby Coombs, Pete Naktenis, and Dave Smith, as well as other rookies like Chubby Dean, Hal Wagner, Wayne Ambler, Ace Parker, and Eric Tipton. In 1934, the As had hit more homers (144) than any other major league team, with a .280 team batting average ahead of the league's .279. However, they lacked strength in their pitching game, compiling an ERA of 5.01 – above the league average of 4.50 – and leading the AL in walks. Reporter Gordon Mackay of the Camden Courier-Post wrote that Connie Mack "hasn’t a hurler destined to go nine innings any time he enters the box."

=== June 8, 1934: Yankees vs. Athletics ===
Flohr's first game on June 8, 1934, had him pitching against baseball legend Babe Ruth. Ruth was nearing the end of his career, playing his last season with the New York Yankees and his second-to-last season of professional baseball altogether. Starting pitcher Lefty Gomez and rookie Harry Matzuak had pitched for the first five innings, and as the Yankees led, Mack summoned Mort Flohr to pitch at the bottom of the sixth. Unfortunately, Flohr's first pitch was an errant ball, hitting the all-star on the wrist and sending the big-hitter out of the game. Ruth was rushed to the hospital, but no bones were found broken, and he resumed playing the next game. Meanwhile, Yankees outfield "caddy" Sammy Byrd, nicknamed “Babe Ruth’s Legs,” ran for Ruth and took his place in right field.

Next up, Lou Gehrig hit Flohr's pitch into the stands above right field, earning himself a fourth hit of the game and a two-run homer nonetheless. Despite this rocky start, Flohr made infield outs against subsequent hitters Myril Hoag and Tony Lazzeri. He then proceeded to give up a double and a single, allowing the Yankees to lead with a score of 11-0. Flohr shut down the Yankees in the seventh inning, but in his first at-bat in the major leagues, struck out, ending the top of the eighth.

Flohr appeared in 14 games, including three starts, with an 0-2 record and a 5.87 ERA. He walked 33 and struck out only 6 in 30 2/3 innings, gave up 34 hits, and threw four wild pitches – second-most on the Philadelphia staff only to Roy Mahaffey.

After the 1934 season, Flohr played a 1937 season in the minor leagues, posting a 1-5 record and an 11.96 ERA with the Ottawa Braves of the Class C Canadian-American League.

Flohr died on June 2, 1994, at age 83, 60 years to the week from his big-league debut.
