= Ham Schulte =

American baseball player (1912–1993)

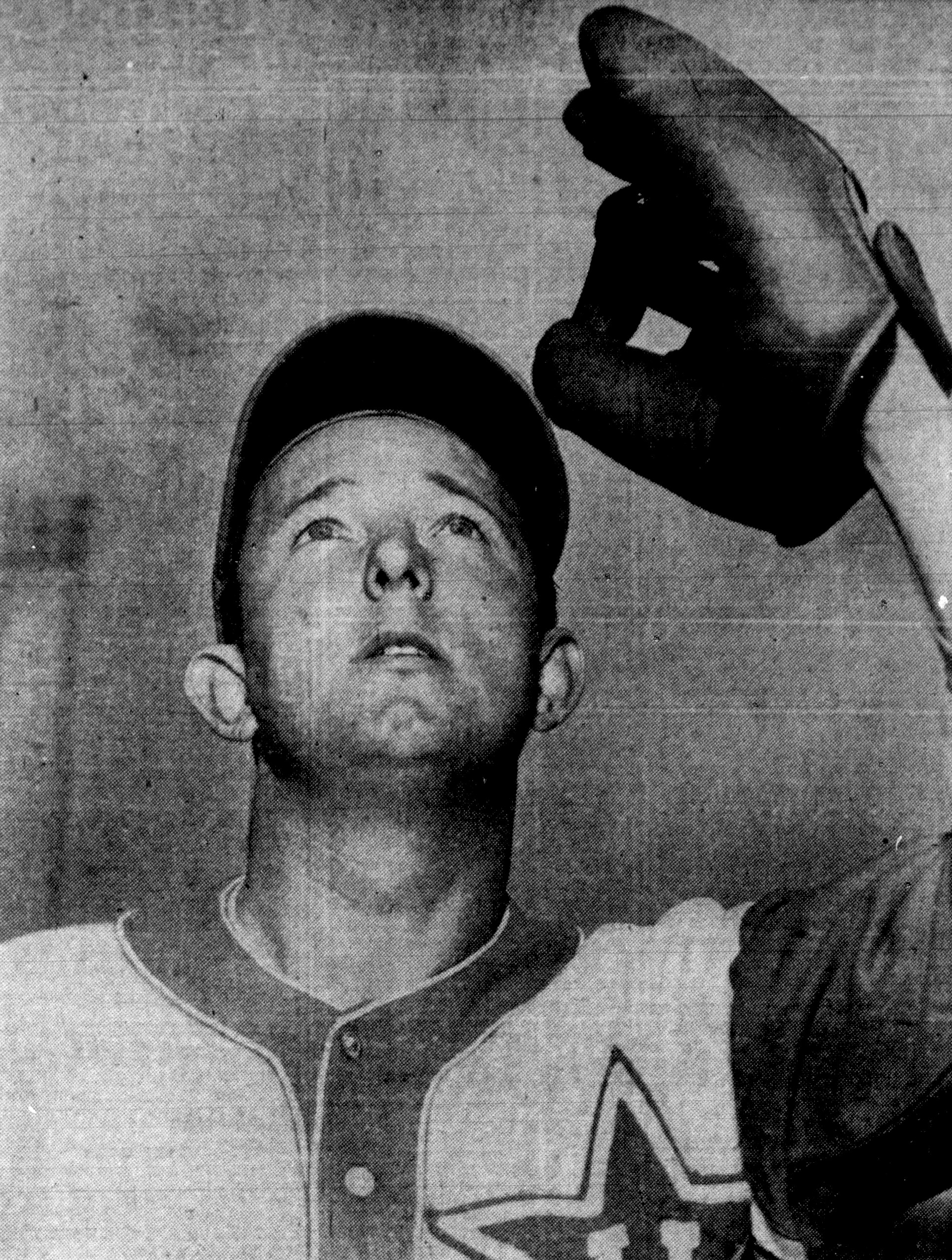
- Schulte, circa 1942
- Second baseman
- Born: September 1, 1912; St. Louis, Missouri, U.S.
- Died: December 21, 1993 (aged 81); St. Charles, Missouri, U.S.
- Batted: Right Threw: Right

MLB debut
- April 16, 1940, for the Philadelphia Phillies

Last MLB appearance
- September 29, 1940, for the Philadelphia Phillies

MLB statistics
- Batting average: .236
- Home runs: 1
- Runs batted in: 21
- Stats at Baseball Reference

Teams
- Philadelphia Phillies (1940)

Herman Joseph "Ham" Schulte (born Schultehenrich; September 1, 1912 – December 21, 1993) was an American professional baseball player. The second baseman appeared in one season (1940) in Major League Baseball as a member of the Philadelphia Phillies. Schulte was born in St. Louis, Missouri, and attended the University of Iowa. A younger brother, Len, also played in MLB as an infielder with the 1944–1946 St. Louis Browns.

Ham Schulte was listed as 5 feet 8 inches (1.73 m) tall and 158 pounds (72 kg); he threw and batted right-handed. His professional career lasted for 18 seasons (1934–1942; 1946–1951), with the 1943–1945 campaigns missed due to his World War II service in the United States Army. During the 1930s, he spent five years at the top levels of the New York Yankees' farm system, until his trade to the Phillies in March 1940.

In his one MLB season, he compiled a .236 batting average in 436 at-bats, with 18 doubles, two triples, one home run and 21 runs batted in. His lone homer came August 16 at the Polo Grounds off Hal Schumacher of the New York Giants in a 5–3 loss, one of the 103 defeats suffered by the Phillies in 1940.

Schulte returned to the high levels of minor league baseball in 1941–1942, then became a player-manager in the minors after returning from the war. He died in St. Charles, Missouri, at the age of 81.
