= Orville Armbrust =

American baseball player

- Pitcher
- Born: March 2, 1910; Beirne, Arkansas, U.S.
- Died: October 2, 1967 (aged 57); Mobile, Alabama, U.S.
- Batted: Right Threw: Right

MLB debut
- September 18, 1934, for the Washington Senators

Last MLB appearance
- September 30, 1934, for the Washington Senators

MLB statistics
- Win–loss record: 1–0
- Strikeouts: 3
- Earned run average: 2.13
- Stats at Baseball Reference

Teams
- Washington Senators (1934)

Orville Martin Armbrust (March 2, 1910 – October 2, 1967) was an American professional baseball pitcher. He appeared in three games in Major League Baseball, two of them starts, in 1934 for the Washington Senators.
