= Tommy Irwin (baseball) =

American baseball player (1912–1996)

- Shortstop
- Born: December 20, 1912; Altoona, Pennsylvania, U.S.
- Died: April 25, 1996 (aged 83); Altoona, Pennsylvania, U.S.
- Batted: Right Threw: Right

MLB debut
- October 1, 1938, for the Cleveland Indians

Last MLB appearance
- October 2, 1938, for the Cleveland Indians

MLB statistics
- Batting average: .111
- Hits: 1
- Home runs: 0
- Stats at Baseball Reference

Teams
- Cleveland Indians (1938)

Thomas Andrew Irwin (December 20, 1912 – April 25, 1996) was an American Major League Baseball player.

Born in Altoona, Pennsylvania, Irwin attended the University of North Carolina, where he played on the school's baseball team. After graduating from college, he signed with the Cleveland Indians, and began playing professionally with the New Orleans Pelicans of the Southern Association. He won the starting shortstop job to begin the 1936 season despite not having any professional baseball experience beforehand. Irwin played in 151 games for the Pelicans both in 1937 and 1938, and finished his second season with a .322 batting average.

Entering the 1938 Cleveland Indians season, Irwin was invited to spring training, and was noted as someone who could win the starting second baseman job. He did not win the job, and was optioned to the Milwaukee Brewers. He played in 125 games on the season, where he had a .296 batting average. At the end of the season, he was promoted to the major league club. He played in the final three games of the season as the team's starting shortstop, and had one hit in nine at-bats.

On December 15, 1938, he was traded to the Boston Red Sox with Denny Galehouse for Ben Chapman. As the Red Sox had Hall of Famer Joe Cronin at the shortstop position, the plan was to keep Irwin in Louisville for a season and go from there. He played in 53 games for the Louisville Colonels, then spent part of 1939 and all of 1940 with the Little Rock Travelers, where he had a .256 batting average in 137 games in 1940. After taking the 1941 season off, he spent part of 1942 with Little Rock. Irwin then the Binghamton Triplets, a team in the New York Yankees organization, and played in 45 games for them before retiring.
