= Icehouse Wilson =

American football and baseball player (1912–1973)

George "Icehouse" Wilson
- Icehouse Wilson, halfback of the "Galloping Gaels"
- Pinch hitter
- Born: September 14, 1912; Maricopa, California, U.S.
- Died: October 13, 1973 (aged 61); Moraga, California, U.S.
- Batted: Right Threw: Right

MLB debut
- May 31, 1934, for the Detroit Tigers

Last MLB appearance
- May 31, 1934, for the Detroit Tigers

MLB statistics
- Batting average: .000
- At bats: 1
- Stats at Baseball Reference

Teams
- Detroit Tigers (1934)

George Peacock "Icehouse" Wilson (September 14, 1912 – October 13, 1973) was an American football and baseball player. He was a star halfback and baseball player for St. Mary's College of California. He also played professional baseball from 1934–1935, including a brief stint in the major leagues with the Detroit Tigers and stints with minor league teams in San Mateo, California, Sioux City, Iowa and Sacramento, California. He later worked as a teacher and coach at Berkeley High School in Berkeley, California for 34 years.

== Early years ==
Wilson was born in Maricopa, California. At age 16, he played for the Montgomery Wards baseball team that won the 1928 American League Junior Series. The team, considered "Oakland's first World Champion Baseball team", won 18 straight games, including 14 by shutouts, in the national junior baseball tournament sponsored by the American Legion. As the team advanced, the Oakland newspapers covered the games and the players on a daily basis, as reflected in the following account: "The excitement that gripped Oakland as their 14 boys progressed through the tournament finals jumps out of the old news clippings. Game results were featured on Page One of the Oakland papers, individual players being written up day after day." When the team returned to Oakland, the headline in the Oakland Tribune read, "Welcome Home World Champions", and the team was greeted at the train station with a victory parade: "Straight up Broadway the lads were paraded, led by a band and drum corps and surrounded by thousands of cheering Oaklanders."

At San Leandro High School in San Leandro, California, Wilson was a star in football and baseball.

== Saint Mary's College ==
After graduating from high school, Wilson enrolled at St. Mary's College in Moraga, California. From 1931–1934, he starred in both football and baseball for the "Galloping Gaels." During the 1930s, St. Mary's football coach, Slip Madigan (later inducted into the College Football Hall of Fame), was an active and colorful promoter of the exploits of his players. One of the tactics Madigan used to promote his players was by "bolstering their reputations with nicknames that promised to titillate the fans and writers in distant cities." Johnny Podesto became "Presto Podesto from Modesto", and it was Madigan who reportedly bestowed the nickname "Icehouse" on his star halfback. The nickname was reportedly given to Wilson because of "his coolness under competitive fire."

The most important game of the year for St. Mary's "Galloping Gaels" football team was an annual rivalry game against Fordham, played each year at the Polo Grounds in New York. In 1933, Wilson was "heralded" by some as "the best ball-lugger on the west coast." When Wilson led St. Mary's to a win over Fordham in 1933, he was described by reporters as "the best halfback ever to play at the Polo Grounds." A photograph of Wilson appeared in newspapers in November 1933 with the following caption:

"THIS 'ICEHOUSE' COOLS 'EM OFF: Here's St. Mary's new backfield sensation – a lad who has the football followers of the Pacific coast calling him an All-American — George (Icehouse) Wilson, star Gael back who has an extremely 'educated' toe as well as the ability to splinter lines for great gains and do very well the other chores of a ball carrier."

Though he became famous as a football player, Wilson was also a star outfielder for the St. Mary's baseball team. As a sophomore, he compiled a batting average of .411. However, a shoulder injury handicapped him in batting as a junior.

== Professional baseball ==
=== Major leagues ===
In 1934, Wilson left college despite having a year remaining in order to play professional baseball. He commenced his professional career in May 1934 with the San Mateo Blues of the California State League. The San Mateo Times announced the signing of Wilson as follows:

"St. Mary's college's brilliant all-American football star and baseball player, George 'Icehouse' Wilson...will make his debut here for San Mateo...Wilson can field as well as hit, and the speed that carried him to fame on the grid field stands him to good advantage in the outfield."

In late May 1934, after a handful of appearances in San Mateo, Wilson was signed by the American League champion Detroit Tigers. The San Mateo News described the news as both startling and inevitable:

"San Mateo fans, if they'll stop and collect their wits a minute, will realize that it was inevitable. Wilson has the makings of a major league sensation. ... That home run clout of his that soared over the left field fence and the double that crashed up against the same fence was proof that Wilson has plenty of power in those husky, broad shoulders of his. ... San Mateo fans will miss Wilson. He was a likeable lad and popular with everyone."

Wilson was a member of the Tigers team for ten weeks in 1934, though he only appeared in one game. His only major league appearance came on May 31, 1934. He pinch-hit for pitcher Luke Hamlin against Ivy Andrews of the St. Louis Browns in the 9th inning of an 11-3 loss. Wilson did not get a hit, resulting in a .000 career batting average in Major League Baseball.

=== Minor leagues ===
After his time in Detroit, Wilson was sent to the minor leagues to play for the Sioux City Cowboys of the Western League. He played 42 games for Sioux City, mostly as an outfielder. In June 1934, Iowa newspapers reported that Wilson had been "hitting the ball hard and playing a fine fielding game" for the Sioux City club. However, after aggravating an old shoulder injury, Wilson missed the remainder of the season.

In 1935, Wilson played for the Sacramento Solons in the Pacific Coast League, but he was released shortly after the season opened.

== Military service ==
Upon the entry of the United States into World War II, Wilson joined the U.S. Navy. In the fall of 1942, he played football for the football team of the United States Navy Pre-Flight School at St. Mary's. In a 1942 football game against the University of Washington, Lieutenant Wilson reportedly "distinguished himself although weather conditions hardly were conducive to sparkling play." He later became a lieutenant commander in the Navy Reserve.

== Teacher and coach ==
After retiring from professional athletics in 1935, Wilson enrolled at the University of California, Berkeley, where he earned a master's degree in history. Wilson worked for 37 years as a school teacher. He began his teaching career at Oroville High School and then McKinley Grade School in Berkeley. He was employed at Berkeley High School for 34 years as a teacher, football and baseball coach, head of the boys' athletic department, vice principal and coordinator of student activities.

Wilson was a member and served as president of the Berkeley Lions Club. He also worked as a football official of the Pacific-8 Conference.

Wilson retired from Berkeley High School in 1973 and died that fall at age 61. Wilson died in Moraga, California, and was buried in St. Joseph Cemetery in San Pablo, California. He was preceded in death by his first wife, Mildred Catherine Beauregard, who died in 1948. Wilson was survived by his wife, Marie, two daughters, Jan Alexander and Sondra Cohelan, and five sons, Terry Wilson, Glen Wilson, Rich Wilson, Tom Wilson and Rob Wilson.
