= John Stone (baseball) =

American baseball player (1905–1955)

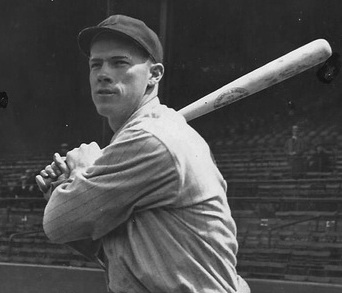
- Stone, circa 1932
- Outfielder
- Born: October 10, 1905; Lynchburg, Tennessee, U.S.
- Died: November 30, 1955 (aged 50); Shelbyville, Tennessee, U.S.
- Batted: Left Threw: Right

MLB debut
- August 31, 1928, for the Detroit Tigers

Last MLB appearance
- June 17, 1938, for the Washington Senators

MLB statistics
- Batting average: .310
- Home runs: 77
- Runs batted in: 710
- Stats at Baseball Reference

Teams
- Detroit Tigers (1928–1933); Washington Senators (1934–1938)

John Thomas Stone (October 10, 1905 – November 30, 1955), nicknamed "Rocky," was an American baseball outfielder. He played 11 season in Major League Baseball for the Detroit Tigers (1928–1933) and Washington Senators (1934–1938). Stone hit over .300 seven times and had a career batting average of .310.

== Early years ==
Stone was born in 1905 in Lynchburg, Tennessee. He attended Maryville College from 1925 to 1928. The school's baseball team was 15-2 in Stone's senior year.

== Professional baseball ==
=== Detroit Tigers ===
Stone signed with the Detroit Tigers and, after a short stint in the minor leagues at Evansville, he appeared in his first major league game on August 31, 1928, just a few months after leaving college. In his first partial season, Stone hit an impressive .354 in 26 games with 15 extra base hits and a .549 slugging percentage.

In 1929, Stone's batting average dropped 94 points to .260, but he returned to solid hitting in 1930 with a .311 batting average and a .452 slugging percentage. During July and August 1930, Stone had a 27-game hitting streak. Only five Detroit Tigers (Ty Cobb, Goose Goslin, Ron LeFlore, Dale Alexander, and Pete Fox) have had longer hitting streaks.

Stone's fourth big league season in 1931 was his best. His .327 batting average was 10th best in the American League. He led the league in singles (142) and was also among the league leaders with 191 hits, 11 triples, and 13 stolen bases. Stone was also 16th in the American League's Most Valuable Player voting for 1931.

In 1932, Stone continued as one of the top batters in the league, with 64 extra base hits, 108 RBIs and a .486 slugging percentage. He ranked ninth in the American League with 283 total bases and also ranked among the Top 10 in triples, home runs and RBIs.

On April 30, 1933, Stone became the first major leaguer to collect six extra base hits in a regulation length doubleheader‚ as he collected four doubles and two home runs against the St. Louis Browns. He finished the 1933 season with a .283 batting average, a .434 slugging percentage, and 55 extra base hits.

On December 13, 1933, Stone was traded to the Washington Senators in exchange for Goose Goslin. Goslin went on to help the Tigers win back-to-back pennants in 1934 and 1935, while the Senators dropped from first place to seventh place in 1934.

=== Washington Senators ===
Stone played for Washington for five seasons from 1934 to 1938, appearing in 556 games and compiling a .317 batting average, .393 on-base percentage, and .476 slugging percentage. Stone retired from baseball after the 1938 season due to a lung ailment.

=== Career statistics ===
Games	PA	AB	R	H	2B	3B	HR	RBI	BB	SO	AVG	OBP	SLG	FLD%
1200	5008	4494	738	1391	268	105	77	710	463	352	.310	.376	.467	.967

== Later years ==
Stone was married to Ruth Ellis Stone. They had a son, John T. Stone, Jr., and a daughter, Suzanne Stone.

When his playing career ended, Stone retired to his farm in Bedford County, Tennessee. He died in 1955 of a heart attack at the age of 50 at his home in Shelbyville, Tennessee. He was buried at the Odd Fellows-Masonic Cemetery in Lynchburg.

== See also ==
- List of Major League Baseball career triples leaders
