= Mark Filley =

American baseball player (1912-1995)

- Pitcher
- Born: February 28, 1912; Lansingburgh, New York, U.S.
- Died: January 20, 1995 (aged 82); Yarmouth, Maine, U.S.
- Batted: Right Threw: Right

MLB debut
- April 19, 1934, for the Washington Senators

Last MLB appearance
- April 19, 1934, for the Washington Senators

MLB statistics
- Games: 1
- Earned run average: 27.00
- Strikeouts: 0
- Stats at Baseball Reference

Teams
- Washington Senators (1934)

Marcus Lucius Filley (February 28, 1912 – January 20, 1995) was an American Major League Baseball pitcher who appeared in one game during 1934 with the Washington Senators. He batted and threw right-handed.

He was born in Lansingburgh, New York and died in Yarmouth, Maine.
