= Jerry McQuaig =

American baseball player (1912–2001)

- Outfielder
- Born: January 31, 1912; Douglas, Georgia, U.S.
- Died: February 5, 2001 (aged 89); Buford, Georgia, U.S.
- Batted: Right Threw: Right

MLB debut
- August 25, 1934, for the Philadelphia Athletics

Last MLB appearance
- September 30, 1934, for the Philadelphia Athletics

MLB statistics
- Games played: 7
- At bats: 16
- Runs scored: 2
- Hits: 1
- Runs batted in: 1
- Batting average: .063
- Stats at Baseball Reference

Teams
- Philadelphia Athletics (1934)

Gerald Joseph McQuaig (January 31, 1912 – February 5, 2001) was an American backup outfielder for the Philadelphia Athletics during the 1934 season.
