= Harlond Clift =

American baseball player (1912-1992)

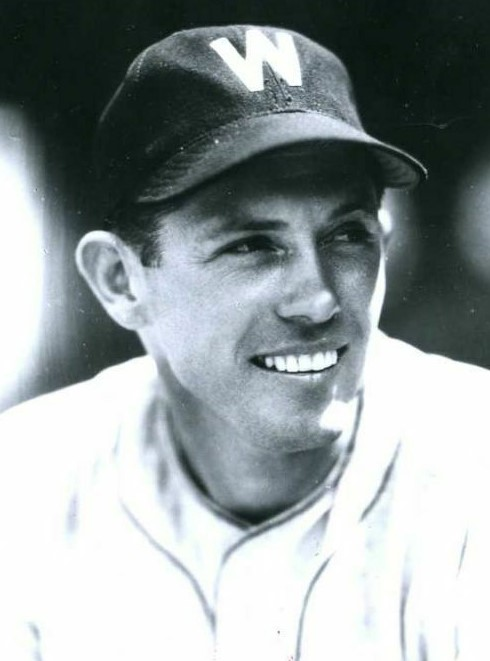
- Third baseman
- Born: August 12, 1912; El Reno, Oklahoma, U.S.
- Died: April 27, 1992 (aged 79); Yakima, Washington, U.S.
- Batted: Right Threw: Right

MLB debut
- April 17, 1934, for the St. Louis Browns

Last MLB appearance
- September 20, 1945, for the Washington Senators

MLB statistics
- Batting average: .272
- Home runs: 178
- Runs batted in: 829
- Stats at Baseball Reference

Teams
- St. Louis Browns (1934–1943); Washington Senators (1943–1945)

Career highlights and awards
- All-Star (1937)

Harlond Benton "Darkie" Clift (August 12, 1912 – April 27, 1992) was a Major League Baseball (MLB) third baseman for the St. Louis Browns (1934–1943) and the Washington Senators (1943–1945). He was an All-Star for the American League in 1937. He threw and batted right-handed, and was listed as 5 feet 11 inches (1.80 m) tall and 180 pounds (82 kg).

== Early life ==
Clift was born in El Reno, Oklahoma. He tried out for the St. Louis Browns in 1931 and sustained an unusual injury during the tryout. While reaching to field a ball, Clift stepped on his own glove, which caused him to trip and roll forward. He broke his collarbone in the fall. Nonetheless, the Browns signed Clift and he made his major-league debut in 1934.

== Career ==
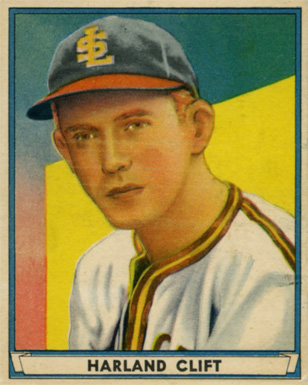
Clift's 1941 Bowman Gum card

Clift batted over .300 twice (in 1936 and 1937) and scored 145 runs in 1936, the second highest total in the American League behind Lou Gehrig. In 1937, he set single-season records of 50 double plays and 405 assists, which stood until 1971. The following year, Clift hit a personal best 34 home runs and equaled his top year for runs batted in with 118.

Clift was traded to the Washington Senators in 1943. A serious case of the mumps and a horse-riding injury hampered Clift's play late in his career. In 12 seasons, Clift played in 1,582 games and had 1,558 hits in 5,730 at bats for a .272 batting average. He belted 178 homers, 309 doubles, 62 triples, and 829 RBI. He scored 1,070 runs and drew 1,070 bases on balls. Clift was one of the first power-hitting third basemen, posting good offensive numbers at a time when players at that position were more valued for their fielding. Nevertheless, Clift was a superb fielder.

Clift's nickname, "Darkie", has what Bill James referred to as "a rather unpleasant derivation": One of his Browns teammates, Alan Strange, misheard Clift's first name and thought that it was Harlem, a predominantly black area in New York.

Clift died in Yakima, Washington at the age of 79.

== See also ==
- List of Major League Baseball career runs scored leaders
