= Ed Lagger =

American baseball player (1912-1981)

- Pitcher
- Born: July 14, 1912; Joliet, Illinois
- Died: November 10, 1981 (aged 69); Joliet, Illinois
- Batted: Right Threw: Right

MLB debut
- June 15, 1934, for the Philadelphia Athletics

Last MLB appearance
- August 27, 1934, for the Philadelphia Athletics

MLB statistics
- Win–loss record: 0-0
- Earned run average: 11.00
- Strikeouts: 2
- Stats at Baseball Reference

Teams
- Philadelphia Athletics (1934)

Edwin Joseph Lagger (June 14, 1912 – November 10, 1981) was a Major League Baseball pitcher who played in 1934 with the Philadelphia Athletics. He batted and threw right-handed.
