= Kit Carson (baseball) =

American baseball player (1912–1983)

- Right fielder
- Born: November 15, 1912; Colton, California
- Died: June 21, 1983 (aged 70); Long Beach, California
- Batted: Left Threw: Left

MLB debut
- July 21, 1934, for the Cleveland Indians

Last MLB appearance
- September 29, 1935, for the Cleveland Indians

MLB statistics
- Batting average: .250
- Games played: 21
- Stats at Baseball Reference

Teams
- Cleveland Indians (1934–1935)

Walter Lloyd "Kit" Carson (November 15, 1912 – June 21, 1983) was a Major League Baseball right fielder who played for the Cleveland Indians in 1934 and 1935. As a 21-year-old rookie in 1934, he was the ninth-youngest player to appear in an American League game that season.

Carson, a native of Colton, California, made his major league debut on July 21, 1934 in a home game against the Boston Red Sox. His last appearance for the Indians was September 29, 1935 in a home game against the St. Louis Browns. He played in a total of 21 games, eight of which were in right field. At the plate he went 10-for-40 (.250) with two runs batted in, five runs scored, and a slugging percentage of .400. In the field he recorded nine putouts without making an error.

In later years, Carson was employed by the Long Beach (California) City College Athletic Department and also managed the Long Beach Rockets amateur baseball team.
