= Johnny Pasek =

American baseball player (1905–1976)

- Catcher
- Born: June 25, 1905; Niagara Falls, New York, U.S.
- Died: March 13, 1976 (aged 70); Niagara Falls, New York, U.S.
- Batted: Right Threw: Right

MLB debut
- July 28, 1933, for the Detroit Tigers

Last MLB appearance
- May 8, 1934, for the Chicago White Sox

MLB statistics
- Batting average: .257
- Hits: 18
- Runs batted in: 4
- Stats at Baseball Reference

Teams
- Detroit Tigers (1933); Chicago White Sox (1934)

John Paul Pasek (June 25, 1905 – May 13, 1976) was an American professional baseball catcher in Major League Baseball. Pasek played for the Detroit Tigers in 1933 and the Chicago White Sox in 1934. He batted and threw right-handed.

Pasek was born in Niagara Falls, New York. From 1927 to 1931, he played for four minor league teams in the Southeastern League, Eastern League, and the New York–Pennsylvania League.

Pasek joined the Detroit Tigers organization in 1932, and had a .260 batting average in 76 for the Beaumont Exporters. In 1933, Pasek had a .292 batting average for the Exporters before getting called up to the Tigers in late July.

He made his Major League debut on July 28 in Cleveland, Ohio as the Tigers were playing the Cleveland Indians. Ray Hayworth started at catcher for the Tigers, going 0-2 before being pinch hit for Jo-Jo White, who singled. Pasek then came in as a defensive replacement for White, and caught for the rest of the game. Pasek got one at bat in his debut game, going 0-1. He also recorded a putout in that game.

Pasek played in 28 games for Detroit in 1933, hitting .246, collecting 15 hits, four runs batted in, and two stolen bases.

On December 12, 1933, Pasek was traded by the Tigers, along with $100,000 to the Philadelphia Athletics for future Baseball Hall of Famer Mickey Cochrane. That same day, the Athletics traded Pasek, along with George Earnshaw to the Chicago White Sox in exchange for Charlie Berry and $20,000.

In 1934, Pasek split time in the minor leagues with the Dallas Steers of the Texas League and the Oakland Oaks of the Pacific Coast League. He had a combined .290 batting average for both clubs. That season, Pasek also briefly got called up by the White Sox, playing in four games for Chicago, going 3-9 with a walk in his short stint with the club.

After playing in a combined 32 Major League games for Detroit and Chicago, Pasek played 12 more years in the minor leagues, mostly with the St. Paul Saints and the Indianapolis Indians. Pasek had a career .278 batting average in his 16-year minor league career, collecting 1,128 hits, 187 doubles, and hitting nine home runs.

On March 13, 1976, Pasek died in his hometown of Niagara Falls, New York. He is buried in Holy Trinity Cemetery in Lewiston, New York.
