= 1934 Chicago White Sox season =

1934 Chicago White Sox
- League: American League
- Ballpark: Comiskey Park
- City: Chicago
- Owners: J. Louis Comiskey
- General manager: Harry Grabiner
- Managers: Lew Fonseca and Jimmy Dykes
- Radio: WGN (Bob Elson); WIND (Johnny O'Hara); WMAQ (Hal Totten)

The 1934 Chicago White Sox season was the team's 34th season in the major leagues and its 35th season overall. They finished with a record of 53–99, good enough for eighth and last place in the American League (47 games behind the first place Detroit Tigers).

== Offseason ==
- October 25, 1933: Chad Kimsey and Charlie English were traded by the White Sox to the Montreal Royals for John Pomorski.

== Regular season ==
=== Season standings ===
American League
Team	W	L	Pct.	GB	Home	Road
Detroit Tigers	101	53	.656	—	54‍–‍26	47‍–‍27
New York Yankees	94	60	.610	7	53‍–‍24	41‍–‍36
Cleveland Indians	85	69	.552	16	47‍–‍31	38‍–‍38
Boston Red Sox	76	76	.500	24	42‍–‍35	34‍–‍41
Philadelphia Athletics	68	82	.453	31	34‍–‍40	34‍–‍42
St. Louis Browns	67	85	.441	33	36‍–‍39	31‍–‍46
Washington Senators	66	86	.434	34	34‍–‍40	32‍–‍46
Chicago White Sox	53	99	.349	47	29‍–‍46	24‍–‍53

=== Record vs. opponents ===
1934 American League record Sources:
Team	BOS	CWS	CLE	DET	NYY	PHA	SLB	WSH
Boston	—	11–10	7–15	8–14	10–12	12–9	14–8	14–8–1
Chicago	10–11	—	8–14	5–17	5–17	9–13	7–14–1	9–13
Cleveland	15–7	14–8	—	6–16	11–11	13–9	15–7	11–11
Detroit	14–8	17–5	16–6	—	12–10	12–10	15–7	15–7
New York	12–10	17–5	11–11	10–12	—	15–7	17–5	12–10
Philadelphia	9–12	13–9	9–13	10–12	7–15	—	9–12–1	11–9–2
St. Louis	8–14	14–7–1	7–15	7–15	5–17	12–9–1	—	14–8
Washington	8–14–1	13–9	11–11	7–15	10–12	9–11–2	8–14	—

=== Notable transactions ===
- May 9, 1934: Red Kress was traded by the White Sox to the Washington Senators for Bob Boken.
- May 20, 1934: Ed Madjeski was signed as a free agent by the White Sox.
- June 27, 1934: Marty Hopkins was purchased by the White Sox from the St. Paul Saints.
- August 11, 1934: Rip Radcliff was purchased by the White Sox from the Louisville Colonels.

=== Roster ===
1934 Chicago White Sox
Roster
Pitchers: 18 George Earnshaw; 22,48 Phil Gallivan; 23 Milt Gaston; 25 Joe Heving; 28 Sam Jones; 24 Vern Kennedy; 17 Harry Kinzy; 19 Hugo Klaerner; 16 Ted Lyons; 24,28 John Pomorski; 27 Lee Stine; 24 Monty Stratton; 38,21 Les Tietje; 19 Whit Wyatt	Catchers: -- George Caithamer; -- Dutch Fehring; 1 Ed Madjeski; 8 Johnny Pasek; 49 Muddy Ruel; 15 Merv Shea; Infielders: 4 Luke Appling; 14 Bob Boken; 3 Zeke Bonura; 12 Joe Chamberlain; 5 Jimmy Dykes; 2 Jackie Hayes; 27 Marty Hopkins; 14 Red Kress; 36 Mark Mauldin	Outfielders: 47 Milt Bocek; 34 Frenchy Bordagaray; 8 Jocko Conlan; 6 Mule Haas; 9 Rip Radcliff; 7 Al Simmons; 9 Evar Swanson; 36 Frenchy Uhalt; 34 Charlie Uhlir	Manager: 5 Jimmy Dykes; 1 Lew Fonseca; Coaches: 37 Jimmy Austin

== Player stats ==
=== Batting ===
==== Starters by position ====
Note: Pos = Position; G = Games played; AB = At bats; H = Hits; Avg. = Batting average; HR = Home runs; RBI = Runs batted in

Pos	Player	G	AB	H	Avg.	HR	RBI
C	Ed Madjeski	85	281	62	.221	5	32
1B	Zeke Bonura	127	510	154	.302	27	110
2B	Jackie Hayes	62	226	58	.257	1	31
3B	Jimmy Dykes	127	456	122	.268	7	82
SS	Luke Appling	118	452	137	.303	2	61
OF	Al Simmons	138	558	192	.344	18	104
OF	Evar Swanson	117	426	127	.298	0	34
OF	Mule Haas	106	351	94	.268	2	22

==== Other batters ====
Note: G = Games played; AB = At bats; H = Hits; Avg. = Batting average; HR = Home runs; RBI = Runs batted in

Player	G	AB	H	Avg.	HR	RBI
Bob Boken	81	297	70	.236	3	40
Jocko Conlan	63	225	56	.249	0	16
Marty Hopkins	67	210	45	.214	2	28
Merv Shea	62	176	28	.159	0	5
Frenchy Uhalt	57	165	40	.242	0	16
Joe Chamberlain	43	141	34	.241	2	17
Frenchy Bordagaray	29	87	28	.322	0	2
Muddy Ruel	22	57	12	.211	0	7
Rip Radcliff	14	56	15	.268	0	5
Milt Bocek	19	38	8	.211	0	3
Mark Mauldin	10	38	10	.263	1	3
Charlie Uhlir	14	27	4	.148	0	3
George Caithamer	5	19	6	.316	0	3
Red Kress	8	14	4	.286	0	1
Johnny Pasek	4	9	3	.333	0	0
Dutch Fehring	1	1	0	.000	0	0

=== Pitching ===
==== Starting pitchers ====
Note: G = Games pitched; IP = Innings pitched; W = Wins; L = Losses; ERA = Earned run average; SO = Strikeouts

Player	G	IP	W	L	ERA	SO
George Earnshaw	33	227.0	14	11	4.52	97
Ted Lyons	30	205.1	11	13	4.87	53
Milt Gaston	29	194.0	6	19	5.85	48
Sam Jones	27	183.1	8	12	5.11	60
Vern Kennedy	3	19.1	0	2	3.72	7
Hugo Klaerner	3	17.1	0	2	10.90	9

==== Other pitchers ====
Note: G = Games pitched; IP = Innings pitched; W = Wins; L = Losses; ERA = Earned run average; SO = Strikeouts

Player	G	IP	W	L	ERA	SO
Les Tietje	34	176.0	5	14	4.81	81
Phil Gallivan	35	126.2	4	7	5.61	35
Whit Wyatt	23	67.2	4	11	7.18	36

==== Relief pitchers ====
Note: G = Games pitched; W = Wins; L = Losses; SV = Saves; ERA = Earned run average; SO = Strikeouts

Player	G	W	L	SV	ERA	SO
Joe Heving	33	1	7	4	7.26	40
Harry Kinzy	13	0	1	0	4.98	12
Lee Stine	4	0	0	0	8.18	8
John Pomorski	3	0	0	0	5.40	0
Monty Stratton	1	0	0	0	5.40	0

== Farm system ==
Level	Team	League	Manager
C	Longview Cannibals	West Dixie League	Roy Flaskamper and Dallas Warren
D	Lafayette White Sox	Evangeline League	Lee Schulte
