= Negro Leagues Baseball Grave Marker Project =

The Negro Leagues Baseball Grave Marker Project is an effort started by Peoria, Illinois anesthesiologist Jeremy Krock and with support of the Society for American Baseball Research to put a proper headstone on the graves of former Negro league baseball players.

== History of the project ==
Founded in 2004, the Project started when Dr. Krock contacted members of the Society for American Baseball Research after he discovered there was no headstone on the grave of Jimmie Crutchfield, a player who grew up in Krock's childhood home of Ardmore, Missouri.

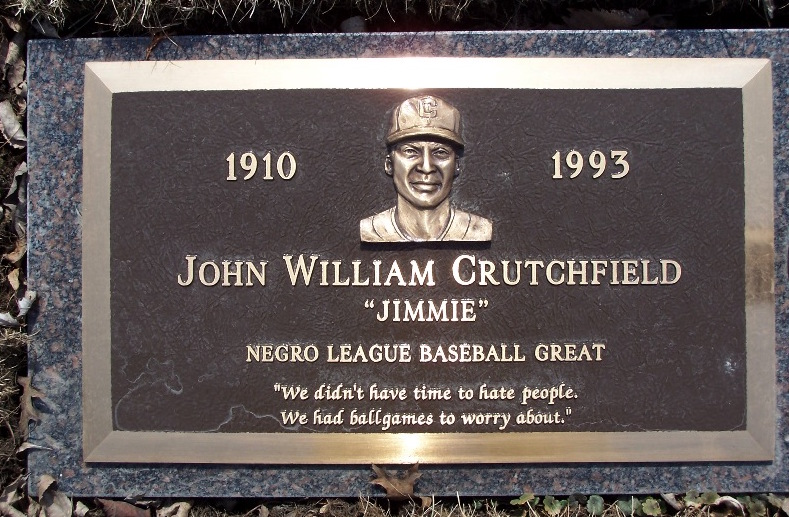
Crutchfield's grave, 2017

After Crutchfield, the Project went on to place headstones on the graves of notables like John Donaldson, Candy Jim Taylor, Theodore "High Pockets" Trent, Steel Arm Johnny Taylor, Sam Bankhead, Bobby Robinson, Bill Gatewood, James Edward "Sap" Ivory, Robery "Fuzzy" Garrett, Frank Grant and Dink Mothell.

Some of the cemeteries where the group has installed stones include Burr Oak Cemetery in Cook County, Illinois, Springdale Cemetery in Peoria, Illinois, East Ridgelawn Cemetery in Clifton, New Jersey, Mt. Zion Cemetery in York County, Pennsylvania, and Greenwood Cemetery and Allegheny Cemetery which are both in Pittsburgh, Pennsylvania.

While the grave marker project depends mostly on small contributions, the group has also received sizeable donations from people like Chicago White Sox owner Jerry Reinsdorf, former player and manager Don Zimmer, and former 8th commissioner of baseball Fay Vincent. In fact, Vincent noted he had met Jimmie Crutchfield and liked him. Vincent has gone on to say the Baseball color line which led to good black athletes being excluded from Major League Baseball was ..."one of the great insults to a community."

The project has managed to seed other gravesite work in the community and in the burial industry. For instance, the wife of Jimmie Crutchfield lay beside him and was also unmarked until the cemetery donated a marker for Julia Crutchfield. Olivia Taylor, the wife of C.I. Taylor is also on the list for a headstone. Often a headstone, such as the marker for Bill Gatewood was donated by the headstone engraver, which automatically advances the donated money to the next Negro league baseball player headstone.

Baseball historian Larry Lester works with Dr. Krock and with other researchers of the Society for American Baseball Research, they have compiled a list of about 3,600 players, their birth dates and death dates, where they are buried, and if they have headstones. Much of the research comes from the Negro Leagues Research Committee, an arm of the Society for American Baseball Research.

== List of players given headstones by the project ==
- Jimmie Crutchfield (2004 - Burr Oak Cemetery)
- John Donaldson (2004 - Burr Oak Cemetery)
- Candy Jim Taylor (2004 - Burr Oak Cemetery)
- Robert Garrett (Umpire) (2005 - Burr Oak Cemetery)
- Theodore "High Pockets" Trent (2005 - Burr Oak Cemetery)
- Daniel G. Burley (Sportswriter) (2005 - Burr Oak Cemetery)
- Guy C. Ousley (2005 - Burr Oak Cemetery)
- William James "Jack" Marshall (2005 - Burr Oak Cemetery)
- Roosevelt "Rosie" Davis (2005 - Burr Oak Cemetery)
- Paul Hardy (2005 - Burr Oak Cemetery)
- Othello Strong (2005 - Burr Oak Cemetery)
- Franklin L. Mann (2008 - Burr Oak Cemetery)
- Lester Lockett (2008 - Oak Wood Cemetery)
- Gable Patterson (2009 - Greenwood Cemetery)
- Robert Gaston (2009 - Greenwood Cemetery)
- Sam Bankhead (2009 - Greenwood Cemetery)
- Bobby Robinson (2010 - Restvale Cemetery)
- Bill Gatewood (2010 - Memorial Park Cemetery)
- James "Sap" Ivory (2010 - Elmwood Cemetery)
- Frank Grant (2011 - East Ridgelawn)
- Dink Mothell (2011 - Mount Hope Cemetery)
- Sol White (2012 - Frederick Douglass Memorial Park)
- Walter Ball (baseball) (2012 - Lincoln Cemetery)
- Bruce Petway (2012 - Lincoln Cemetery)
- Pete Hill (2013 - Holy Sepulchre Cemetery)
- Olivia Taylor (2013 - Crown Hill Cemetery)
- Ted Page (2013 - Allegheny Cemetery)
- Ted Strong (2013 - Lincoln Cemetery)
- Bill Francis (2013 - Lincoln Cemetery)
- Home Run Johnson (2014 - Lakeside Cemetery)
- Connie Morgan (2014 - Mount Lawn Cemetery)
- Fred Goree (2014 - Lincoln Cemetery)
- William Binga (2014 - Crystal Lake Cemetery)
- Clarence "Waxey" Williams (2016 - Atlantic City Cemetery)
- Topeka Jack Johnson (2016 - Mount Auburn Cemetery)
- Weldy Wilberforce Walker (2016 - Union Cemetery)
- Gus Brooks (2016)
- Dan McClellan (2019 - Eden Cemetery)
- Charles Alexander Mills (2019 - St Peters Cemetery)
- Saul Davis (2019 - Rosehill Cemetery)
- Henry Bridgewater (2020 - St Peters Cemetery)
- Peter "Creole Pete" Robertson (2020 - Pinelawn Memorial Park)
- S.K. Govern (2021 - Eden Cemetery)
- William Lindsay (2021 - Forest Grove Cemetery)
- Robert Alexander "Frog" Lindsay (2021 - Forest Grove Cemetery)
- William "Ashes" Jackson (2021 - Forest Grove Cemetery)
- Sylvester Chauvin (2022 - Calvary Cemetery)
- Elias "Country Brown" Bryant (2022 - Frederick Douglass Cemetery)
- Newton Henry "Newt" Allen (2022 - Union Baptist Cemetery)
- Comer Lane "Hannibal" Cox (2022 - St. Peter’s Cemetery)
- Robert "Killer" Palm (2022 - St. Peter’s Cemetery)
- Robert Paul Gilkerson (2022 - Miller Cemetery)
- Frank Warfield (2023 - Mount Auburn Cemetery)

== List of players given headstones by coordinators outside the project ==
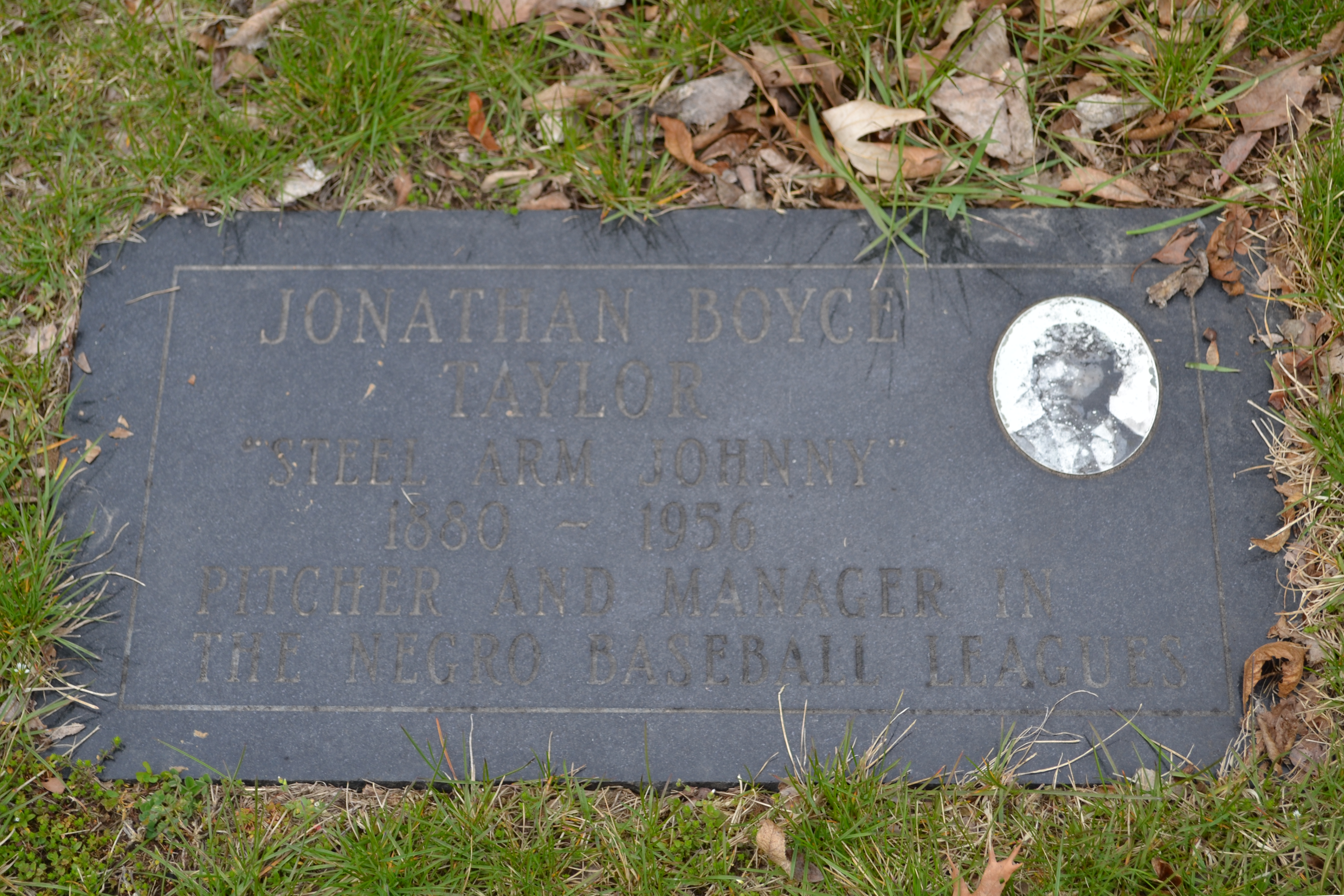
Grave of "Steel Arm" Johnny Taylor at Springdale Cemetery, March 2024

- Steel Arm Johnny Taylor (2007 - Springdale Cemetery) Organized by Pekin Coalition for Equality
- Lester Lockett (2008 - Oak Wood Cemetery) Courtesy of Chris Bohus
- Home Run Johnson (2014 - Lakeside Cemetery) Funding efforts led by Henry W. Henry, Jr.
- Clarence "Waxey" Williams (2016 - Atlantic City Cemetery) Coordinated with the Friends of Waxey Williams

== Future grave markers currently receiving funding ==
- Cecil Kaiser
- Henry Bridgewater
- Sellers McKee Hall

== Honors and awards ==
In 2011, the Josh Gibson foundation honored Dr. Krock and the people behind his Grave Marker Project. Gibson himself was buried in an unmarked grave for nearly three decades.

Krock has received numerous awards from Society for American Baseball Research, including a 2011 Fay Vincent Most Valuable Partner Award at the Jerry Malloy Negro League Conference. Krock also gives an annual report at this conference.

== Burr Oak Cemetery controversy ==
On July 9, 2009, Cook County Sheriff Tom Dart alleged that four workers at Burr Oak Cemetery dug up more than 200 graves, dumped the bodies into unmarked mass graves, and resold the plots in a scheme that went back at least five years. Burr Oak Cemetery has become well known as one of the few cemeteries that has historically focused on the needs of the African American community, it is the final resting place of many black celebrities, including Chicago blues musicians, athletes, and other notables.

Chicago's Cook County Sheriff's Office created a website to give anyone in the world the ability to search 43,555 photos in a database of marked, identified graves at the Burr Oak Cemetery. While it is unknown if any Negro league baseball players' graves were involved in the Burr Oak Cemetery scandal, researchers continue work to determine if this is true.
