= Jack Johnson (second baseman) =

American baseball player (1883–1940)

- Second baseman / Manager
- Born: April 25, 1883; Topeka, Kansas, U.S.
- Died: January 29, 1940 (aged 56); Topeka, Kansas, U.S.
- Batted: Right Threw: Right

debut
- 1903, for the Chicago Union Giants

Last appearance
- 1911, for the Kansas City Giants

Teams
- Chicago Union Giants (1903) to (1905), (1907); Topeka Giants (1906), (1917); Minneapolis Keystones (1908); Kansas City Giants (1909, 1911); Kansas City Royal Giants (1910, 1912)

John Thomas "Topeka Jack" Johnson (April 25, 1883 – January 29, 1940) was an American Negro leagues second baseman and manager for several years before the founding of the first Negro National League. He was also a professional boxer and trainer, and his nickname may have resulted from the need to distinguish him from the heavyweight champion Jack Johnson.

== Baseball career ==
Johnson was an alumnus of Washburn University in Topeka, Kansas. His boxing career spanned into the 1920s and he fought against Jack Johnson, Joe Jeanette (knockout of Johnson Dec 21, 1911) and Sam Langford, whom he fought to a draw on August 19, 1921. In baseball, Johnson's fielding was described as "swift" and "above criticism."

Johnson played for the Chicago Union Giants from 1903 to 1905 and again in 1907, his teammates including George Hopkins, Albert Toney, and Joe Green. He founded and managed the Topeka Giants in 1906, taking them on a tour of Nebraska, Iowa, Illinois, Missouri and Kansas.

When the Kansas City, Kansas based Kansas City Giants turned fully professional in 1909, the Kansas City Giants owner Tobe Smith signed numerous local players who had played for the Jenkins and Sons and a Kansas City Monarchs semi-pro team and hired "Topeka Jack" Johnson to be the Kansas City Giants player/manager. In the winter of 1909, Johnson helped form the Kansas City Royal Giants negro leagues team to be based in Kansas City, Missouri. The Kansas City Royal Giants began play in the 1910 season, immediately becoming a local rival of the Kansas City Giants.

The Kansas Royal Giants were owned by Kansas City businessmen M.B. Garrett and George Washington Walden, with Jack Johnson hired to manage the ballclub. Fortune J. Weaver was also an owner of the KC Royal Giants and was president of the Afro-American Realty and Investment Company. Just before the start of the 1910 season, Topeka Jack Johnson unsuccessfully attempted to start a Negro National League, writing articles that appeared in newspapers in Chicago and other major cities. Johnson wrote: "It certainly has been proven from the big leagues on down to the minors, that there is nothing in the world that beats organized baseball and harmony..."

Johnson left the Kansas City Royal Giants after the 1910 season and returned to manage the Kansas City Giants in 1911. After the 1911 season, Kansas City Giants player and former Royal Giants player Dee Williams was shot to death in Kansas City and the Kansas City Giants continued play, but as a semi–pro barnstorming level team with a depleted roster. Topeka Jack Johnson then returned to the Kansas City Royal Giants in 1912, with Johnson and owner George Washington Walden resolving their differences.

Playing for and managing the Kansas City Giants in 1909 and 1911, and the Kansas City Royal Giants in 1910 and 1912, Johnson worked with players like Tullie McAdoo, Bill Pettus, a young 18-year-old Bill Lindsay, Bingo DeMoss, and Hurley McNair.

In 1917 Johnson managed "Jack Johnson's Topeka Giants," a team that played at least one game against the All Nations baseball club.

In 2016, the Society for American Baseball Research (SABR) held a ceremony, dedicating a new grave marker for "Topeka Jack" Johnson at Mount Auburn Cemetery in Topeka, Kansas.
