= 1910 in baseball =

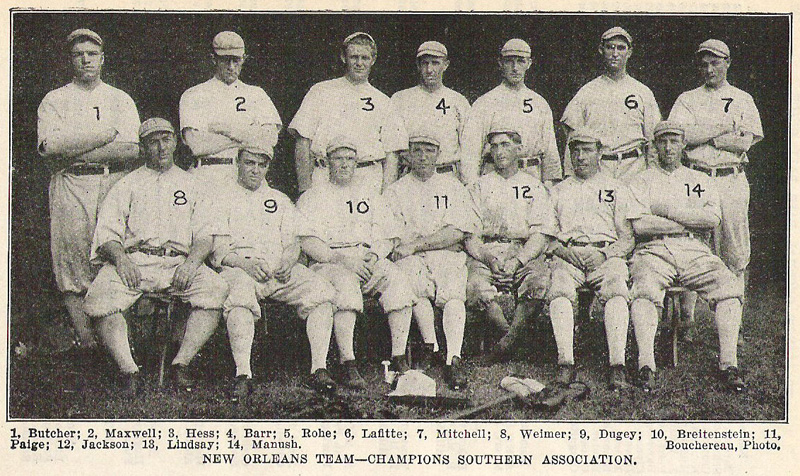
Baseball players in 1910

The following are the baseball events of the year 1910 throughout the world.

== Champions ==
- World Series: Philadelphia Athletics over Chicago Cubs (4–1)

== Awards and honors ==
- Chalmers Award
  - Ty Cobb, Detroit Tigers, OF
  - Nap Lajoie, Cleveland Naps, 2B

== Statistical leaders ==
	American League		National League	
Stat	Player	Total	Player	Total
AVG	Nap Lajoie (CLE)	.383	Sherry Magee (PHI)	.331
HR	Jake Stahl (BOS)	10	Fred Beck (BSN); Frank Schulte (CHC)	10
RBI	Sam Crawford (DET)	120	Sherry Magee (PHI)	123
W	Jack Coombs (PHA)	31	Christy Mathewson (NYG)	27
ERA	Ed Walsh (CWS)	1.27	King Cole (CHC)	1.80
K	Walter Johnson (WSH)	313	Earl Moore (PHI)	185

== Major league baseball final standings ==
=== American League final standings ===
American League
Team	W	L	Pct.	GB	Home	Road
Philadelphia Athletics	102	48	.680	—	57‍–‍19	45‍–‍29
New York Highlanders	88	63	.583	14½	49‍–‍25	39‍–‍38
Detroit Tigers	86	68	.558	18	46‍–‍31	40‍–‍37
Boston Red Sox	81	72	.529	22½	51‍–‍28	30‍–‍44
Cleveland Naps	71	81	.467	32	39‍–‍36	32‍–‍45
Chicago White Sox	68	85	.444	35½	41‍–‍37	27‍–‍48
Washington Senators	66	85	.437	36½	38‍–‍35	28‍–‍50
St. Louis Browns	47	107	.305	57	26‍–‍51	21‍–‍56

Locations of teams for the 1910 American League season
American League

=== National League final standings ===
National League
Team	W	L	Pct.	GB	Home	Road
Chicago Cubs	104	50	.675	—	58‍–‍19	46‍–‍31
New York Giants	91	63	.591	13	52‍–‍26	39‍–‍37
Pittsburgh Pirates	86	67	.562	17½	46‍–‍30	40‍–‍37
Philadelphia Phillies	78	75	.510	25½	40‍–‍36	38‍–‍39
Cincinnati Reds	75	79	.487	29	39‍–‍37	36‍–‍42
Brooklyn Superbas	64	90	.416	40	39‍–‍39	25‍–‍51
St. Louis Cardinals	63	90	.412	40½	35‍–‍41	28‍–‍49
Boston Doves	53	100	.346	50½	29‍–‍48	24‍–‍52

Locations of teams for the 1909–1910 National League seasons
National League

== Events ==
- April 14 – William Howard Taft became the first U.S. president to throw out the ceremonial "first pitch" after he opened the 1910 season at Washington's League Park. Washington Senators' Walter Johnson christened the tradition by pitching a one-hitter, beating the Philadelphia Athletics, 3–0.
- April 20 – Addie Joss of the Cleveland Naps pitches the second no-hitter of his career defeating the Chicago White Sox, 1–0. Joss was the last major leaguer to throw a no-hitter, when he tossed a perfect game on October 2, 1908. That game was also a 1–0 win over the White Sox.
- May 12 – Chief Bender throws a no-hitter for the Philadelphia Athletics, coming within one walk of a perfect game. Philadelphia beats the Cleveland Naps, 4–0.
- June 28 – Chicago Cubs shortstop Joe Tinker steals home twice becoming the first major leaguer to accomplish the feat in Cubs' 11–1 home victory over the Cincinnati Reds. Mordecai Brown is the winning pitcher.
- July 3 – Pittsburgh Pirates outfielder Chief Wilson hits for the cycle in a 10–2 victory over the Cincinnati Reds.
- July 19 – Cleveland Naps ace Cy Young wins the 500th game of his career, defeating the Washington Senators, 5–4.
- August 13 — The "baseball game of perfect symmetry" took place as Brooklyn and Pittsburgh played an 8–8 tie before the game was called because of darkness. Each team had 8 runs, 13 hits, 2 errors, 12 assists, 5 strikeouts, 3 walks, one base hit, and one passed ball.
- August 18 – Rickwood Field opens in Birmingham, Alabama, with 10,000 fans watching the Birmingham Barons defeat the Montgomery Climbers in a 3–2 pitchers' duel won by Harry Coveleski.
- August 25 – Philadelphia Athletics second baseman Danny Murphy hits for the cycle in a 9–6 loss to the St. Louis Browns.
- September 1 – During the league's Rule 5 draft, the Chicago White Sox select infielder Buck Weaver from York in the Tri-State League. Weaver is best remembered today as one of players banned for life regarding the 1919 World Series fix.
- September 17 – Detroit Tigers pitcher Ed Summers, a notoriously poor hitter, bounces two home runs into the stands in a 10–3 victory over the Philadelphia Athletics. The two homers, both off Harry Krause, will comprise his career total.
- October 6 – Boston Doves outfielder Bill Collins hits for the cycle as Boston crushes the Philadelphia Phillies, 20–7. Collins becomes the first player in baseball history to hit for the natural cycle.
- October 9 – Detroit Tigers star Ty Cobb stayed out of the lineup to preserve his .383 batting average. Cleveland Naps' Nap Lajoie went 8-for-8 in a doubleheader where six of his hits were bunt singles. He finished with a .384 batting average and rumor has it that the St. Louis Browns gave Lajoie the singles by playing too deep. American League president Ban Johnson investigated and found no wrongdoing.
- October 23 – The Philadelphia Athletics defeat the Chicago Cubs, 7–2, in Game 5 of the World Series to win their first World Championship, four games to one.

== Births ==
=== January ===
- January 1 – Charlie Devens
- January 3 – Frenchy Bordagaray
- January 4 – Gabe Paul
- January 7 – Johnny McCarthy
- January 10 – Johnny Peacock
- January 11 – Schoolboy Rowe
- January 16 – Dizzy Dean
- January 19 – Hugh Poland
- January 19 – Dib Williams
- January 20 – Frank Makosky
- January 22 – Prince Oana
- January 24 – Johnny Dickshot
- January 27 – Harry Matuzak

=== February ===
- February 1 – Dutch Lieber
- February 10 – Bob Logan
- February 14 – Alex Sabo
- February 24 – Fred Sington

=== March ===
- March 2 – Ace Adams
- March 3 – Bill Brenzel
- March 7 – Fred Archer
- March 7 – Howie McFarland
- March 11 – Ernesto Aparicio
- March 16 – Bob Poser
- March 19 – Robert Gaston
- March 27 – Vince Sherlock
- March 27 – Steve Sundra
- March 29 – Bill Dietrich

=== April ===
- April 4 – Joe Bokina
- April 4 – Joe Vosmik
- April 8 – Charlie English
- April 12 – Bill Miller
- April 15 – Eddie Mayo
- April 22 – Lew Riggs
- April 24 – Sam Harshaney
- April 25 – Jimmy Brown
- April 27 – Frenchy Uhalt

=== May ===
- May 9 – Mike Balas
- May 10 – Joe Chamberlain
- May 12 – Lefty Mills
- May 13 – Boze Berger
- May 17 – Lou Chiozza
- May 19 – Tommy Thompson
- May 21 – Larry Rosenthal
- May 22 – Terris McDuffie
- May 23 – Earl Huckleberry
- May 26 – Jim McCloskey
- May 28 – Willard Hershberger
- May 29 – George McQuinn

=== June ===
- June 6 – Chet Morgan
- June 10 – Frank Demaree
- June 17 – Joe Bowman
- June 18 – Russ Hodges
- June 23 – Bill Perrin
- June 26 – Jim Henry
- June 28 – Lee Gamble
- June 29 – Francis Healy
- June 29 – Burgess Whitehead

=== July ===
- July 7 – Ernie Sulik
- July 7 – Jelly Taylor
- July 9 – Ray Thomas
- July 16 – Bill Norman
- July 17 – Sammy Holbrook
- July 18 – Wes Livengood
- July 19 – Harry Kinzy
- July 22 – George Caithamer
- July 23 – Paul Chervinko
- July 25 – LeGrant Scott
- July 31 – Glenn Liebhardt
- July 31 – Gordon McNaughton

=== August ===
- August 13 – Lou Finney
- August 14 – Billy Myers
- August 17 – Pat McLaughlin
- August 19 – Atley Donald
- August 23 – Lonny Frey
- August 25 – George Cisar
- August 27 – Ewald Pyle
- August 28 – Jack Peerson
- August 31 – Ira Hutchinson

=== September ===
- September 3 – Jack Redmond
- September 6 – Johnny Lanning
- September 9 – Bud Thomas
- September 10 – Buddy Blair
- September 10 – Eddie Sawyer
- September 11 – Les Tietje
- September 17 – Paul Hardy
- September 21 – Elden Auker
- September 21 – Max Butcher
- September 24 – Tom Seats
- September 24 – Dixie Walker
- September 26 – Joe Sullivan
- September 30 – Jennings Poindexter
- September 30 – Frank Skaff

=== October ===
- October 3 – Bob Bowman
- October 3 – Felix Evans
- October 4 – Frankie Crosetti
- October 8 – Wally Moses
- October 12 – Walter Signer
- October 18 – Skeeter Newsome
- October 20 – Sammy T. Hughes
- October 20 – Bob Sheppard
- October 23 – Billy Sullivan
- October 26 – Hugh Shelley

=== November ===
- November 4 – Joe Beggs
- November 6 – Chet Covington
- November 7 – Bill Brubaker
- November 16 – Morrie Arnovich
- November 18 – Joe Cicero
- November 18 – Dykes Potter
- November 23 – Hal Schumacher
- November 27 – Hank Miklos
- November 28 – Ed Gallagher
- November 28 – Bill McWilliams
- November 29 – Ed Leip

=== December ===
- December 9 – Steve Larkin
- December 10 – Pretzel Pezzullo
- December 11 – Slick Coffman
- December 15 – George Stumpf
- December 20 – Calvin Chapman
- December 22 – Stan Klopp
- December 24 – Lloyd Johnson

== Deaths ==
=== January–February ===
- January 12 – Harry Staley, 43, National League pitcher who had four 20-win seasons from 1889 to 1892 for Pittsburgh and Boston teams.
- January 22 – Sam Wise, 52, infielder, mainly for the 1880s Boston National League teams, who was shortstop of the 1883 champions and batted .334 in 1887.
- January 29 – Marty Barrett, 49, catcher who played in 1884 for the Boston Beaneaters of the National League and the Indianapolis Hoosiers of the American Association.
- January 31 – Pidgey Morgan, 56, OF/3B and pitcher for the St. Louis Red Stockings of the National Association (1875) and the Milwaukee Grays of the National League (1878).
- February 8 – Flip Lafferty, 55, who pitched one game for the 1876 Philadelphia Athletics, and played four games in center field for the 1877 Louisville Grays.
- February 8 – Cy Vorhees, 35, pitcher for the NL Philadelphia Phillies and AL Washington Senators in the season.
- February 15 – Bug Holliday, 43, outfielder who hit .311 over parts of 10 seasons with the Cincinnati Red Stockings/Reds, who twice led all hitters in home runs (AA, 1889/NL, 1892) and also umpired for one season.
- February 17 – Horatio Munn, 58, second baseman for the 1875 Brooklyn Atlantics of the National Association.

=== March–April ===
- March 14 – Mike Hines, 47, catcher who played from 1883 to 1888 for the Boston Beaneaters, Brooklyn Grays and Providence Grays.
- March 16 – Charlie Reipschlager, 54, American Association catcher who hit .222 in 296 games for the New York Metropolitans and Cleveland Blues (1883–1887).
- March 18 – Alan Storke, 25, National League infielder who played from 1906 through 1909 for the Pittsburgh Pirates and St. Louis Cardinals.
- April 2 – Jim Nealon, 25, first baseman from 1906 to 1907 for the Pittsburgh Pirates, who tied with Harry Steinfeldt the National League RBI title during his rookie season.
- April 9 – Bob Addy, 65, second baseman/outfielder for six different teams (1871–1877), who also managed the Philadelphia White Stockings (1875) and Cincinnati Reds (1877).
- April 16 – Bill Kienzle, 48, outfielder for the Philadelphia Athletics of the American Association (1882) and the Philadelphia Keystones of the Union Association (1884).
- April 16 – Tom Loftus, 53, manager of teams in Milwaukee, Cleveland, Cincinnati, Chicago and Washington, and later chairman of rules committee.
- April 25 – Jim Carleton, 61, first baseman for the Cleveland Forest Citys from 1871 and 1872.

=== May–June ===
- May 4 – Patrick Gillespie, 58, slugging left fielder who hit .276 with 10 home runs and 371 RBI in 714 games for the New York Giants and Troy Trojans of the National League (1880–1887).
- May 25 – Bill Hassamaer, 45, outfielder who played from 1894 to 1896 for the Louisville Colonels and Washington Senators of the National League.
- June 22 – Tom Doran, 29, catcher for the Boston Americans and Detroit Tigers between 1904 and 1906.

=== July–August ===
- July 14 – Jack Horner, pitcher for the 1894 Baltimore Orioles of the American Association.
- July 27 – Theodore Conover, 42, pitcher for the 1889 Cincinnati Red Stockings of the American Association.
- August 19 – Bill Lennon, 62, National Association catcher who, on the very first major league game ever played, scored the first run and became the first catcher to throw out a baserunner attempting to steal a base (May 4, 1871).
- August 31 – Duke Esper, 42, pitcher who posted a 101–110 record and a 4.39 ERA with seven different cubs between 1890 and 1898.

=== September–October ===
- September 4 – Candy Nelson, 61, shortstop who played 13 seasons between 1872 and 1890 for nine different teams in three different leagues. compiling a .253 career-average in 817 games.
- September 20 – Lou Schiappacasse, 29, American League right fielder for the 1902 Detroit Tigers.
- September 24 – George Boone, 39, pitcher who played with the Louisville Colonels of the American Association in 1891.
- October 2 – Sandy McDougal, 36, pitcher for the Brooklyn Grooms (1895) and St. Louis Cardinals (1905).
- October 6 – Lawrence Farley, 54, outfielder for the 1884 Washington Nationals of the American Association.
- October 12 – George Mundinger, 55, catcher for the 1884 Indianapolis Hoosiers of the American Association.
- October 20 – George Ewell, 59, outfielder who appeared in one game for the 1871 Cleveland Forest Citys of the National Association.

=== November–December ===
- November 1 – Bob Pettit, 49, infielder/outfielder from 1887 to 1891 for the NL Chicago White Stockings and AA Milwaukee Brewers.
- November 20 – Jack O'Brien, 50, American Association catcher/first baseman for the Philadelphia Athletics, Brooklyn Grays/Bridegrooms and Baltimore Orioles between 1882 and 1890.
- November 23 – Charlie Barber, 56, third baseman for the 1884 Cincinnati Outlaw Reds of the Union Association.
- December 13 – Dan McGann, 39, a three-time .300 hitter and first baseman on the New York Giants' pennant winners of 1904 and 1905, who became the first player to steal five bases in a single game (1904) –a feat not matched in the National League until Davey Lopes did it for the Los Angeles Dodgers (1974) and not surpassed until Otis Nixon of the Atlanta Braves swiped six (1991).
- December 25 – John Deasley, 49, shortstop who hit .204 in 44 games for the Washington Nationals and Kansas City Cowboys of the Union Association (1884).
