= William Norman =

William Norman may refer to:

- William Norman (VC) (1832–1896), English recipient of the Victoria Cross
- William Norman (cricketer) (1932–2009), New Zealand cricketer
- William Henry Norman (1812–1869), sea captain in Australia
- Shin Norman (William Rufus Norman, 1886–?), Negro leagues pitcher
- Bill Norman (football manager) (William Lewis Norman, 1873–1931), English football manager
- Bill Norman (footballer) (William John Norman, 1926–2017), Australian rules footballer
