= Burr Oak Cemetery =

Cemetery in Alsip, Illinois, United States

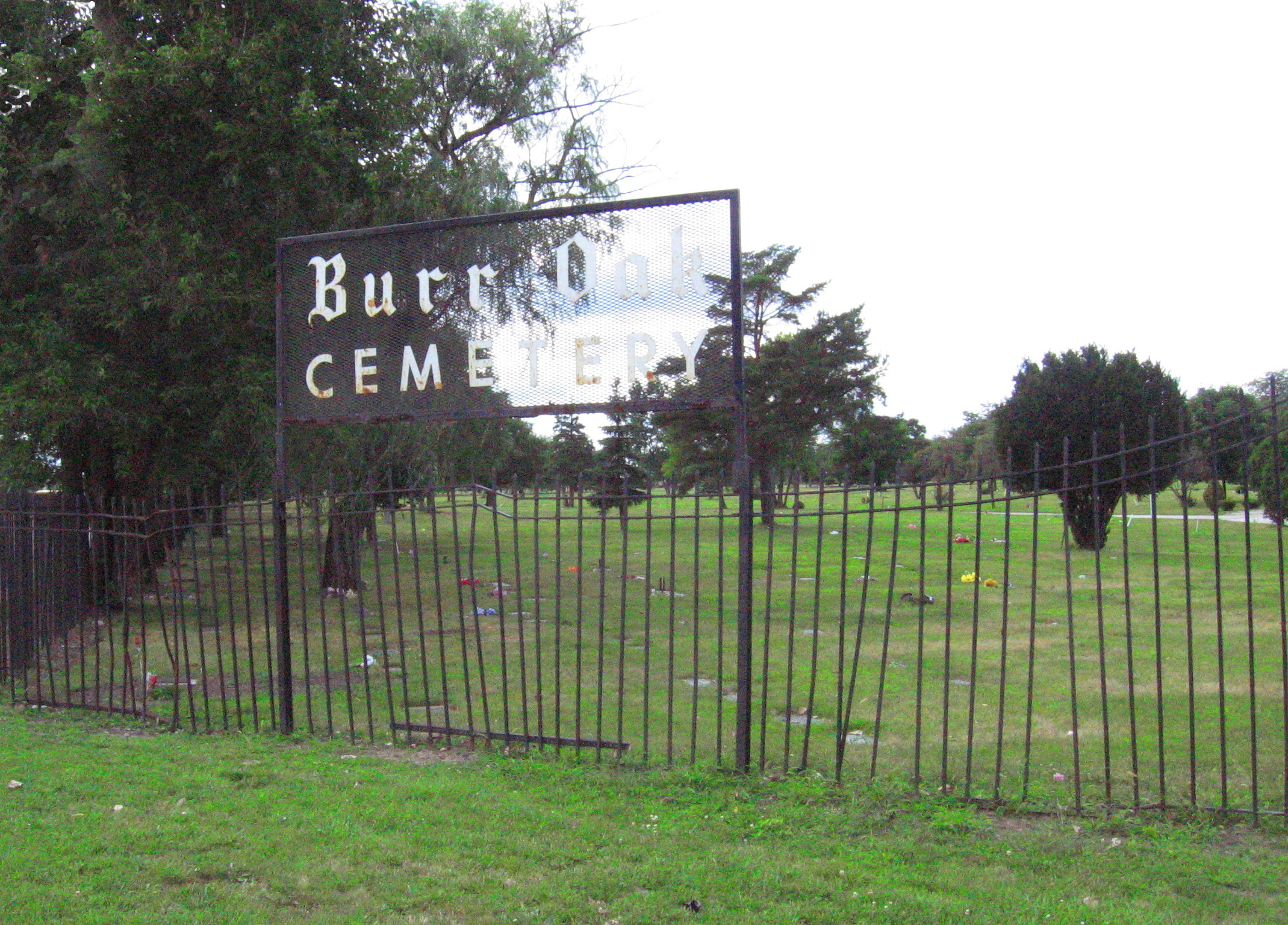
- Photograph of the side entrance to Burr Oak Cemetery on 127th Street, 2009
- Interactive map of Burr Oak Cemetery

Details
- Established: 1927
- Location: Alsip, Illinois
- Country: United States
- Coordinates: 41°39′45″N 87°43′47″W
- Size: 150-acre (0.61 km^{2})
- Website: theburroakcemetery.com
- Find a Grave: Burr Oak Cemetery

Burr Oak Cemetery is a cemetery located in Alsip, Illinois, United States, a suburb southwest of Chicago, Illinois. Established in 1927, Burr Oak was one of the few early Chicago cemeteries focused on the needs of the African-American community, it is the final resting place of many African-American celebrities, including Chicago blues musicians and athletes.

== History ==
The cemetery was established in 1927 with a focus on the African American community in Chicago. Ellis Stewart, secretary of the black-owned Supreme Liberty Life Insurance company, joined with Earl B. Dickerson, a prominent Chicago lawyer, to develop a cemetery that would meet the needs of the burgeoning African-American population in Chicago, a demographic change brought about by the great migration of African-Americans from the South during the early decades of the 20th century. Stewart had located a possible site for the cemetery just outside the Chicago city limits near Alsip, Illinois. The owners of the land ultimately sold 40 acres for $50,000, $40,000 of which was loaned by the Roosevelt State Bank and the remainder raised by subscription. The new group was incorporated as the Burr Oak Cemetery Association, and a suitable corpse was found in the morgue to legally dedicate the cemetery. Unfortunately, the Alsip townsfolk did not approve of an African-American cemetery next to the village and, "with the assistance of armed police", drove the burial party away. The burial party eventually returned, however, with a deputy sheriff (courtesy of Robert E. Crowe the Republican state's attorney) and was successfully able to legally dedicate Burr Oak.

During the Great Depression, the Burr Oak Cemetery Association defaulted on the mortgage. Dickerson again stepped in to help arrange for the black-owned Supreme Liberty Life Insurance company to buy the mortgage at roughly 10 cents to the dollar. The re-constituted Chicago Burr Oak Cemetery Association eventually paid off the mortgage. Dickerson later said that "saving that cemetery was one of the great achievements as a lawyer".

The cemetery was listed on the National Register of Historic Places in 2026.

== 2009 scandal ==
=== Incident ===
On July 11, 2009, Cook County Sheriff Tom Dart alleged that four workers at Burr Oak cemetery dug up more than 200 graves, dumped the bodies into unmarked mass graves, and resold the plots in a scheme that went back at least five years. The three men and one woman were charged with one count each of dismembering a human body. Two men were convicted and sentenced to six and three year prison terms.

=== Investigation ===
Because of the investigation, the entire cemetery was declared a crime scene by the Cook County Sheriff's Office and temporarily closed. The court-assigned receiver managing the cemetery had hoped to reopen it in September, but on October 13, 2009, visiting families found the cemetery still closed, with no statement on when it would reopen. The sheriff's office set up a searchable database with photographs of most headstones. The cemetery records were in great disarray, but the usable ones were computerized and turned over to the receiver for integration into the database.

A study of the records indicated that between 140,190 and 147,568 people were buried at Burr Oak, but the cemetery has space for only 130,000 graves, and some areas appear never to have been used for burials. After burials resumed in November 2009, some human remains were found in areas unknown to have been used. On May 24, 2011, a federal judge approved a plan to place the cemetery into a trust that would use about $2.6 million of a $7 million insurance settlement to renovate and run the cemetery. The judge set aside at least $50,000 for a memorial to honor those whose graves were lost or desecrated. Those who can prove they buried relatives in the cemetery will receive $100 per grave. Those whose relatives' graves were destroyed may apply for more money.

== Notable burials ==
- Barbara Acklin (1942–1998), singer and songwriter.
- Noble Drew Ali (1886–1929), founder of the Moorish Science Temple of America.
- James "Kokomo" Arnold (1901–1968), musician.
- Dayvon Bennett (1994–2020), Drill rapper and Chicago gangster.
- Big Time Sarah (1953–2015), blues singer.
- Timuel Black Jr., (1918–2021), educator, civil rights activist.
- Harold Bradley Sr. (1905–1973), one of the first African-American players in the NFL.
- Ollie Byrd (1896–1929), professional Negro league baseball player
- Dallas Carter (1888–1942), professional Negro league baseball player
- Ezzard Charles (1921–1975), world heavyweight boxing champion.
- George "Sonny" Cohn (1925–2006), musician, jazz trumpeter.
- Willie Cornelius (1906–1989), professional Negro league baseball player.
- Norman Cross (1910–1982), professional Negro league baseball player
- Jimmie Crutchfield (1910–1993), All-Star Negro league baseball player.
- Lester Davenport (1932–2009), Chicago blues harmonica player, singer, and songwriter.
- Blind John Davis (1913–1985), blues and boogie-woogie pianist and singer.
- Rosey Davis (1904–1968), professional Negro league baseball player.
- Bingo DeMoss (1889–1965), professional Negro league baseball player and manager.
- Earl B. Dickerson (1891–1986), attorney and community activist who successfully argued Hansberry v. Lee before the US Supreme Court. Dickerson helped establish and preserve Burr Oak Cemetery.
- Willie Dixon (1915–1992), blues musician and songwriter.
- John Donaldson (1892–1970), baseball player, star pre-Negro league baseball pitcher and barnstormer businessman.
- Richard Durham (1917–1984) cremated remains, creator and scriptwriter of the Chicago-based radio series Destination Freedom
- Jodie Edwards (1895–1967), comedian, member of the comedy duo Butterbeans and Susie.
- Rev. Dr. Clay Evans (1925–2019), Baptist pastor & civil rights leader.
- Malachi Favors (1937–2004), jazz musician.
- Blind Leroy Garnett (1897–1933), musician, boogie-woogie and ragtime pianist and songwriter.
- Charles Albert "Joe" Green (1878–1962), professional baseball player.
- Carl Augustus Hansberry (1895–1946), businessman and political activist, father of playwright Lorraine Hansberry.
- Halley Harding (1904–1967), professional Negro league baseball player and journalist and newspaper editor.
- Paul Hardy (1910–1979), professional Negro league baseball player.
- Frog Holsey (1906–1972), professional Negro league baseball player.
- Inman "Big Jack" Jackson (1907–1973), basketball player, player with the Harlem Globetrotters.
- Annie Turnbo Malone (1877–1957), businesswoman, inventor and philanthropist.
- Roberta Martin (1907–1969), Gospel music singer, pianist, composer and founder of The Roberta Martin Singers.
- Mississippi Matilda (1914–1978), Delta blues singer and songwriter.
- Maxwell Street Jimmy Davis (1925–1995), electric blues singer, guitarist, and songwriter.
- Tullie McAdoo (1884–1961), professional Negro league baseball player.
- Guy Ousley (1910–1964), professional Negro league baseball player.
- Tiny Parham (1900–1943), Canadian-born American jazz bandleader and pianist.
- Graham T. Perry (1900–1960), politician, one of the first African-Americans to serve as assistant attorney general for the State of Illinois, father of director Shauneille Perry and uncle of playwright Lorraine Hansberry.
- Alex Radcliff (1905–1983), professional Negro league baseball player.
- Frank Reed (1954–2014), lead singer of The Chi-Lites.
- Jimmie Lee Robinson (1931–2002), blues musician.
- Otis Spann (1930–1970), blues pianist.
- James A. "Candy Jim" Taylor (1884–1948), Negro league baseball player and manager.
- Sandy Thompson (1895–1965), professional Negro league baseball player.
- Emmett Till (1941–1955), teenaged murder victim whose death helped galvanize the U.S. Civil Rights Movement.
- Mamie Till-Mobley (1921–2003), activist, educator and mother of Emmett Till.
- Tiny Topsy (given name Otha Lee Moore) (1930–1964), R&B singer
- Ted Trent (1903–1944), Negro league baseball player, pitcher.
- Cap Tyson (1903–1973), professional Negro league baseball player.
- Admiral Walker (1898–2001), professional Negro league baseball player.
- William J. Warfield (1883–1966), officer in the Illinois National Guard and a state legislator.
- Dinah Washington (1924–1963), singer, known as the "Queen of the Blues".
- LeRoy Whitfield (1969–2005), journalist reporting on AIDS among African-Americans.
- Billy Williams (1910–1972), African–American singer.
- J. Mayo Williams (1894–1980), early blues and jazz record producer and one of the first African-American players in the NFL.
- Estelle Yancey (1896–1986), blues singer.
- Edward "Pep" Young (1913–1967), Negro league baseball player, first baseman.

== See also ==
- List of United States cemeteries
