= Red Foster (baseball) =

American baseball player

- First baseman

Negro league baseball debut
- 1907, for the Birmingham Giants

Last appearance
- 1911, for the Kansas City Royal Giants

Teams
- Birmingham Giants (1907–1908); San Antonio Black Bronchos (1909); Oklahoma Monarchs (1910); Kansas City Giants (1910); Kansas City Royal Giants (1911)

Charles B. Foster, nicknamed "Red" or "Alabama Red", was an American Negro league first baseman between 1907 and 1911.

Foster made his Negro leagues debut in 1907 with the Birmingham Giants, and played for Birmingham again the following season. He went on to play for the San Antonio Black Bronchos, Oklahoma Monarchs, Kansas City Giants, and Kansas City Royal Giants through 1911.
