= Otto Bolden =

American baseball player

- Catcher
- Born: July 22, 1879; Waco, Texas
- Died: February 17, 1930 (aged 50); Kansas City, Missouri

Negro league baseball debut
- 1909, for the San Antonio Black Bronchos

Last appearance
- 1912, for the Kansas City Royal Giants

Teams
- San Antonio Black Bronchos (1909); Los Angeles Trilbys (1910); Oklahoma Monarchs (1910); Kansas City Giants (1911); Kansas City Royal Giants (1912)

Otto Bolden (July 22, 1879 – February 17, 1930) was an American Negro league catcher between 1909 and 1912.

== Career ==
A native of Waco, Texas, Bolden made his Negro leagues debut in 1909 with the San Antonio Black Bronchos. He went on to play for the Los Angeles Trilbys, Oklahoma Monarchs, Kansas City Giants, and Kansas City Royal Giants.

On August 31, 1910, Bolden married Lucy Johnson, sister of boxer Jack Johnson, in Chicago.

Bolden died in Kansas City, Missouri in 1930 at age 50.
