= Shin Norman =

American baseball player

William Rufus "Shin" Norman
- Pitcher
- Born: March 3, 1886; Topeka, Kansas, U.S.
- Batted: Unknown Threw: Unknown

debut
- 1908, for the Leland Giants

Last appearance
- 1913, for the Chicago Union Giants

Teams
- Topeka Giants (1906); Leland Giants (1907–1909); Chicago Giants (1910); Kansas City Giants (1911); Chicago Union Giants (1913)

William Rufus "Shin" Norman (born March 3, 1886) was an American Negro leagues pitcher for several years before the founding of the first Negro National League.

The 20-year-old Norman was pitching for Topeka Jack Johnson's Topeka Giants when the team toured Nebraska, Iowa, Illinois, Missouri and Kansas in 1906. The tour included several games in Chicago, including one with the Leland Giants, a team Norman would move to in the next season.

He pitched for the Leland Giants, the Chicago Union Giants, and the Kansas City Giants.
