= Dee Williams =

Dee Williams may refer to:

- Dee Williams (baseball) (1884–1911), American baseball player
- Dee Williams (actress) (born 1977), American pornographic actress
- Dee Williams (American football) (born 1999), American football cornerback

== See also ==
- Billy Dee Williams (born 1937), American actor
