= Robert Boone (baseball) =

American baseball player

- Pitcher
- Born: March 28, 1884; Memphis, Tennessee
- Died: December 30, 1954 (aged 70); Kansas City, Missouri
- Threw: Left

Negro league baseball debut
- 1909, for the San Antonio Black Bronchos

Last appearance
- 1912, for the Kansas City Royal Giants
- Stats at Baseball Reference

Teams
- San Antonio Black Bronchos (1909); Oklahoma Monarchs (1910); Kansas City Royal Giants (1911–1912)

Robert Boone (March 28, 1884 - December 30, 1954) was an American Negro league pitcher between 1909 and 1912.

A native of Mississippi, Boone made his Negro leagues debut in 1909 with the San Antonio Black Bronchos. He went on to play for the Oklahoma Monarchs and Kansas City Royal Giants.
