= Bob Mitchell (baseball) =

American baseball player (1932–2019)

Negro leagues
- Pitcher
- Born: November 18, 1932; West Palm Beach, Florida
- Died: June 12, 2019 (aged 86); Tampa, Florida
- Batted: Left Threw: Right

Teams
- Kansas City Monarchs (1954–1957)

Bob Mitchell (November 12, 1932 – June 12, 2019) was an American pitcher who played in Negro league baseball.

== Biography ==
Born and raised in West Palm Beach, Florida, Mitchell was fascinated with baseball since he was an 11-year-old while watching the all-black West Palm Beach Yankees club, often through knotholes in the grandstand or earning a close-up look by selling peanuts. In his spare time, he swatted tennis balls with broom handles or just tuned his fastball tossing rocks at targets on train tracks.

Mitchell graduated from Roosevelt High School in 1951. Though he had an interest in writing, his main motivation was to play baseball. The same year, he won a spot with his beloved West Palm Beach team in the Florida Negro League. In 1952, he pitched for the Florida Cubans based in Lakeland, Florida, home field and training center of the major league Detroit Tigers. Mitchell spent two seasons with the team, including a showdown with the Kansas City Monarchs and a highly touted prospect named Ernie Banks. After the game, Mitchell was approached by the Monarchs manager Buck O'Neil, who showed interest in his pitching abilities. Mitchell then was invited to throw batting practice to the Monarchs and earned a contract to join the team, which had a strong pitching staff featuring the legendary Satchel Paige.

Mitchell debuted with the Monarchs in 1954 and made his first appearance against the Indianapolis Clowns, in which he threw his fastball and his curveball. That was the first start of his four-year career with the Kansas City club. In 1956, Mitchell asked the then manager Jelly Taylor to let him pitch the game that evening in Canada, something pitchers did not do. He pitched a complete game victory while striking out 13 batters in his nine innings of work. He finished his Negro American League career with a 30-14 record.

Mitchell retired in 1957 and married his pregnant fiancéé. He then worked for Pratt & Whitney Aircraft United Technologies from 1964 to 1993.

Mitchell never forgot his former Negro league ballplayers, becoming an advocate for those men whose careers in the Negro leagues did not pave the way for inclusion into organized baseball. In 1993, he successfully lobbied Major League Baseball for a pension plan for black players who were excluded after 1947, the year Jackie Robinson integrated white baseball, getting about 85 players were granted an annual pension. While some MLB teams added black players to their rosters during the decade after Robinson's breakthrough, most only signed one or two black players at a time. Those actions denied most Negro leaguers the chance to show off their skills in the majors and also denied them the pensions afforded those players.

Mitchell continued the fight for those who continued playing in the Negro leagues ball after 1947. As a result, additional black players became eligible to receive supplementary financial assistance from MLB in 2004, including survivor benefits for widows and supplementary financial assistance. As of late 2003, 41 Negro leagues players were drawing the annual $10,000 pension while supplying health insurance for an additional 34 Negro leagues players and spouses, included in the separate 1993 deal.

In his third attempt to aid Negro leaguers, Mitchell managed to get MLB to finally decide that players on segregated black baseball teams in the late 1940s and 1950s were discriminated against because the so-called white leagues did not fully integrate until 1959.

Mitchell received his due recognition in 2008, when he was selected by the Arizona Diamondbacks in the MLB special draft of the surviving Negro league players. Hall of Fame Baseball player Dave Winfield hatched the idea to have this draft while MLB clubs each selected a former NLB player.

Mitchell settled in Tampa Bay, Florida and took an active role in teaching children the essentials of reading, writing, and arithmetic as well as moral values and the importance of faith. He died on June 12, 2019.
