= Tenny =

Tenny may refer to:

== People ==
- Elissa Tenny, American academic
- William Tenny, American baseball player
- Tenny Blount, American sports executive
- Tenny Edwards, American baseball player
- Tenny Manalo, wife of Filipino church leader Eraño Manalo
- Tenny Palepoi, American football player
- Tenny Svensson, Swedish tennis player
- Tenny Wright, American film director
- Tenny Wyss, Swiss swimmer

== Other uses ==
- Tenny River, United States

== See also ==
- Tenné, a shade of orange
- Tennies, a slang term for athletic shoes
