= Ginney Robinson =

- Catcher
- Batted: Unknown Threw: Unknown

debut
- 1902, for the Chicago Columbia Giants

Last appearance
- 1911, for the Kansas City Giants

Teams
- Chicago Columbia Giants (1902); Algona Brownies (1903); Leland Giants (1905–1906); Chicago Union Giants (1908); Kansas City Giants (1909–1911)

Robert "Ginney" Robinson (birthdate unknown) was an American professional baseball catcher and in the pre-Negro leagues.

Robinson was on teams lists in Chicago from 1902 to 1908. He then moved to Kansas City to play for the Kansas City Giants from 1909 to 1911.

He caught for Bill Holland, Will Horn, Walter Ball, Bill Gatewood, Harry Buckner, Bill Lindsay, and Hurley McNair.
