= Sam Bennett (baseball) =

American baseball player (1884–1969)

- Outfielder
- Born: March 7, 1884; Austin, Texas, U.S.
- Died: January 30, 1969 (aged 84); St. Louis, Missouri, U.S.
- Batted: Right Threw: Right

Negro league baseball debut
- 1911, for the St. Louis Giants

Last appearance
- 1925, for the St. Louis Stars
- Stats at Baseball Reference

Teams
- San Antonio Black Bronchos (1908–1909); Oklahoma Monarchs (1910); St. Louis Giants/Stars (1911–1913, 1915–1923, 1925); New York Lincoln Giants (1913–1914); Schenectady Mohawk Giants (1914); Chicago American Giants (1914); Louisville White Sox (1914); Dayton Marcos (1920); St. Louis Giants (1924)

Samuel Bennett (March 7, 1884 – January 30, 1969) was an American professional baseball outfielder in the Negro leagues. He played from 1911 to 1925 with several teams, but he played mostly with the St. Louis Giants/Stars.
