= Uhlíř =

Uhlíř (feminine: Uhlířová) is a Czech surname, meaning 'charcoal burner'. Notable people with the surname include:

- Charlie Uhlir (1912–1984) American baseball player
- Ivana Uhlířová (born 1980), Czech actress
- Jaroslav Uhlíř (born 1945), Czech composer
- Vladimíra Uhlířová (born 1978), Czech tennis player
