= Arthur Hardy (baseball) =

American baseball player

- Pitcher
- Born: February 17, 1891; Topeka, Kansas
- Died: September 1980 (aged 89); Buffalo, New York
- Threw: Right

Negro league baseball debut
- 1911, for the Kansas City Giants

Last appearance
- 1911, for the Kansas City Giants

Teams
- Kansas City Royal Giants (1911)

Arthur Wesley Hardy Jr. (February 17, 1891 – September 1980) was an American Negro league pitcher in the 1910s.

A native of Topeka, Kansas, Hardy attended Washburn University. He pitched for the Kansas City Giants in 1911, posting a 3–1 record and a 2.87 ERA over 31.1 innings. Hardy died in Buffalo, New York in 1980 at age 89.
