= Tom Stirman =

American baseball player and manager

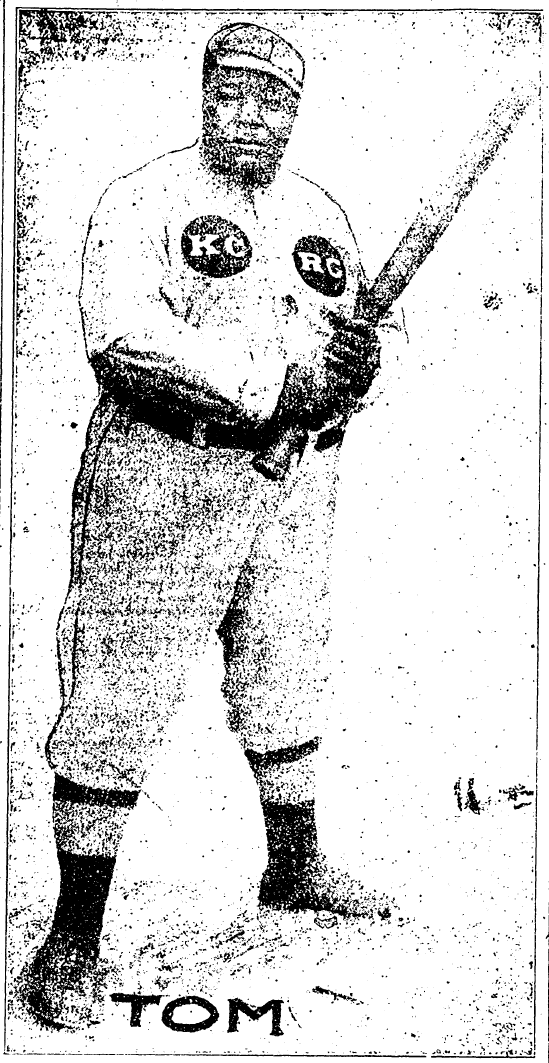
- Left field / Manager
- Born: December 29, 1879; Missouri, U.S.
- Batted: Left Threw: Unknown

debut
- 1909, for the Kansas City Giants

Last appearance
- 1914, for the Marion County team

Teams
- Kansas City Giants (1909); Kansas City Royal Giants (1910–1912); Marion County Ohio team (1914)

Thomas Stirman (born August 22, 1879) was an American Negro leagues outfielder and manager for several years before the founding of the first Negro National League.

He began playing semi-pro baseball in Kansas City, for the Jenkins Piano Company team, and the Bradbury Piano Company team before scoring a role with the Kansas City Giants by 1909.

He spent a few years playing with the Kansas City Royal Giants, and ended up playing for a Marion County, Ohio City League team in 1914. He was asked to manage one of those teams for the 1915 season.
