= Henry Washington =

Henry Washington may refer to:

- Henry Washington (Royalist) (1615–1664), officer in the Royalist army during the English Civil War
- Henry Washington (planter) (1749–1825), American planter and legislator in Virginia
- Henry Stephens Washington (1867–1934), American geologist

== See also ==
- Harry Washington, slave of George Washington, who fought for the British and migrated to Sierra Leone
- Harry Washington (American football) (born 1956), American football wide receiver
- Rube Washington (Harry Washington), American Negro league pitcher
