= William Sloan =

William Sloan may refer to:

- William Gibson Sloan (1838–1914), Scottish evangelist
- William Sloan (politician) (1867–1928), Canadian businessman and politician
- William Elvis Sloan (1867–1961), American inventor
- William Sloan (baseball) (1886–1931), American baseball player
- William Glenn Sloan (1888–1987), American inventor and scientist
- William Boyd Sloan (1895–1970), U.S. judge

== See also ==
- Bill Sloan
- William Sloane (disambiguation)
