= Bill Norman =

Bill Norman may refer to:

- Bill Norman (baseball), American outfielder, coach, manager and scout in Major League Baseball
- Bill Norman (football manager), English football manager
- Bill Norman (footballer), Australian rules footballer
