= Guy Jackson =

Guy Jackson may refer to:

- Guy Jackson (cricketer)
- Guy Jackson (tennis)
- Guy Jackson (baseball)
