= Son Hatten =

American baseball player

- Third baseman

Negro league baseball debut
- 1911, for the Kansas City Royal Giants

Last appearance
- 1911, for the Kansas City Royal Giants

Teams
- Kansas City Royal Giants (1911)

Son Hatten was an American Negro league third baseman in the 1910s.

Hatten played for the Kansas City Royal Giants in 1911. In three recorded games, he posted one hit in 11 plate appearances.
