= Jimmie Crutchfield =

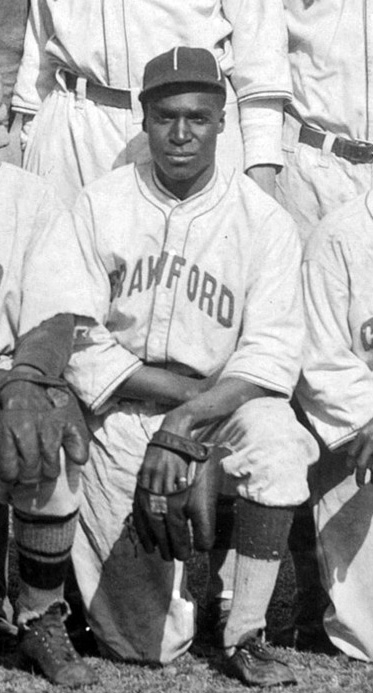
- Outfielder
- Born: March 25, 1910; Ardmore, Missouri, U.S.
- Died: March 31, 1993 (aged 83); Chicago, Illinois, U.S.
- Batted: Left Threw: Right
- Stats at Baseball Reference

Teams
- Birmingham Black Barons (1930); Indianapolis ABCs (1931); Pittsburgh/Toledo Crawfords (1931–1936, 1939); Homestead Grays (1932); Newark Eagles (1937-1938); Chicago American Giants (1941-1942, 1944-1945); Cleveland Buckeyes (1944)

John William "Jimmie" Crutchfield (March 25, 1910 – March 31, 1993) was an American professional baseball outfielder in Negro league baseball from 1930 to 1945.

== Career ==
Crutchfield began his career with the Birmingham Black Barons in 1930, but the following year moved to the Indianapolis ABC's. When the team ran into financial difficulties, he left to play with the Pittsburgh Crawfords, where he remained for the next five years. Teamed with Ted Page and Cool Papa Bell, they formed what is considered the best outfield in the Negro leagues. During this time, his performance earned him three appearances in the East-West All-Star game. In the 1935 game, Crutchfield made an astonishing catch when he chased down a long drive and leapt in the air, catching the ball in his bare hand. In 1941, he was named an All-Star again, this time as a member of the Chicago American Giants.

Crutchfield served in the military during World War II from 1943 to 1944. After his baseball career was over, he went to work for the United States Postal Service.

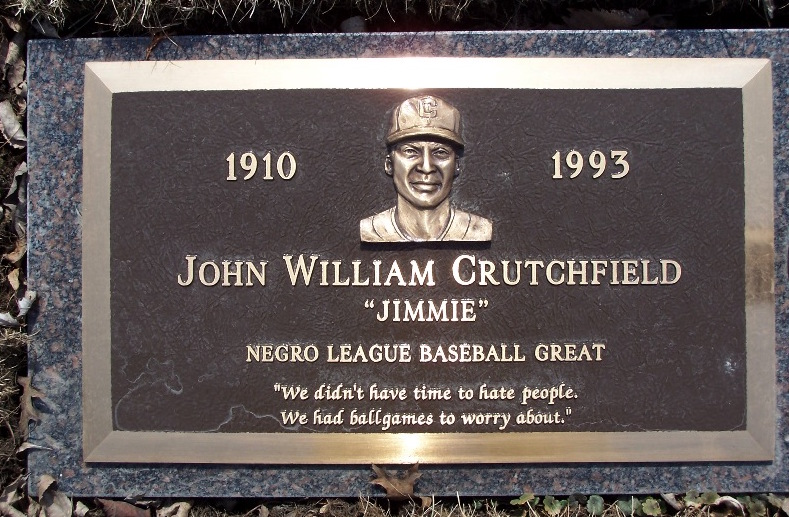
Jimmie Crutchfield's Grave Marker

Crutchfield died in Chicago in 1993 and was interred in the nearby Burr Oak Cemetery, Alsip, Illinois, buried in an unmarked grave until 2004 when Peoria, Illinois, anesthesiologist Jeremy Krock contacted members of the Society for American Baseball Research to try to get a proper headstone on the grave of Crutchfield, who originally came from the same town as Krock. This launched the Negro Leagues Baseball Grave Marker Project, with which Dr. Krock still works today.
