= Jack Marshall (second baseman) =

American baseball player

- Second baseman
- Born: August 8, 1908; Montgomery, Alabama, U.S.
- Died: August 31, 1990 (aged 82); Chicago, Illinois, U.S.
- Batted: Right Threw: Right

Negro league baseball debut
- 1932, for the Chicago American Giants

Last appearance
- 1944, for the Cincinnati Clowns

Teams
- Chicago American Giants (1932–1938); Philadelphia Stars (1936); Kansas City Monarchs (1938); Cincinnati Clowns (1944)

William James Marshall (August 8, 1908 – August 31, 1990), nicknamed "Boisy", was an American Negro league second baseman between 1926 and 1944.

== Biography ==
Marshall's grave at Burr Oak Cemetery

A native of Montgomery, Alabama, Marshall played seven seasons with the Chicago American Giants from 1932 to 1938. He also played for the Philadelphia Stars in 1936, and the Kansas City Monarchs in 1938, and finished his career with a brief stint with the Cincinnati Clowns in 1944. Marshall died in Chicago, Illinois in 1990 at age 82, and was buried at Burr Oak Cemetery in Alsip.
