= William Sloane =

William Sloane may refer to:

- William Douglas Sloane (1844–1915), American businessman, sportsman, philanthropist
- William Milligan Sloane (1850–1928), American educator and historian
- William A. Sloane (1854–1930), American judge
- William Sloane (author) (1906–1974), American writer

== See also ==
- William Sloan (disambiguation)
- William Sloane Coffin (1924–2006), liberal Christian clergyman
