= Ashes Jackson =

American baseball player

- Shortstop
- Born: May 8, 1882; Dover, Missouri
- Died: January 1, 1949 (aged 66); Lexington, Missouri

Negro league baseball debut
- 1909, for the Kansas City Giants

Last appearance
- 1912, for the Kansas City Royal Giants

Teams
- Kansas City Giants (1909–1911); Kansas City Royal Giants (1912)

Wilbur "Ashes" Jackson (May 8, 1882 – January 1, 1949) was an American Negro league shortstop between 1909 and 1912.

Jackson played for the Kansas City Giants from 1909 to 1911, and for the Kansas City Royal Giants in 1912. In 31 recorded career games, he posted 30 hits in 131 plate appearances.
