= Arthur Tiller =

American baseball player

- Outfielder

Negro league baseball debut
- 1909, for the Indianapolis ABCs

Last appearance
- 1911, for the Kansas City Royal Giants

Teams
- Indianapolis ABCs (1909); Kansas City Royal Giants (1911)

Arthur Tiller was an American Negro league outfielder between 1909 and 1911.

Tiller made his Negro leagues debut in 1909 with the Indianapolis ABCs. He went on to play for the Kansas City Royal Giants in 1911.
