= Roy Dorsey =

American baseball player

- Pitcher
- Born: April 25, 1889; Kansas City, Missouri
- Died: August 26, 1972 (aged 83); Kansas City, Missouri

Negro league baseball debut
- 1911, for the Kansas City Giants

Last appearance
- 1911, for the Kansas City Giants

Teams
- Kansas City Giants (1911)

Roy Lee Dorsey (April 25, 1889 – August 26, 1972) was an American Negro league pitcher in the 1910s.

A native of Kansas City, Missouri, Dorsey played for the Kansas City Giants in 1911. He died in Kansas City, Missouri in 1972 at age 83.
