= Gabe Patterson =

American multi-sport athlete

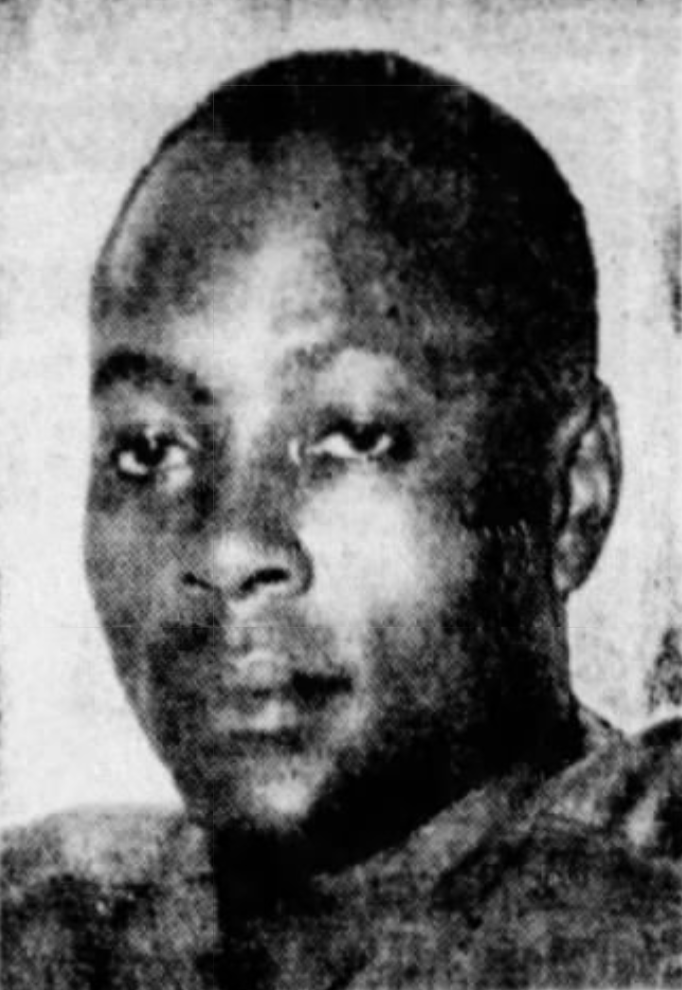

Profile
- Positions: Halfback, kicker

Personal information
- Born: September 9, 1919; Greenwood, South Carolina
- Died: October 26, 1991 (aged 72); Pittsburgh, Pennsylvania

Career information
- College: Kentucky State, Pittsburgh

Career history
- 1947–48: Saskatchewan Roughriders

Awards and highlights
- 2× CFL All-Star (1947, 1948)

Gabe Patterson
- Outfielder
- Batted: Right Threw: Right

Negro league baseball debut
- 1941, for the New York Black Yankees

Last appearance
- 1948, for the Philadelphia Stars

Teams
- New York Black Yankees (1941, 1947); Philadelphia Stars (1947–1948)

Gabe Patterson (September 9, 1919 – October 26, 1991), nicknamed "Galloping Gabe", was an American professional multi-sport athlete who played Canadian football and Negro league baseball.

== Career ==
Patterson played high school football at Schenley High School in Pittsburgh, and his college football at Kentucky State and the University of Pittsburgh. He was signed by the Montreal Alouettes in 1947, but was released. He then signed with the Saskatchewan Roughriders, playing two seasons and was selected an all-star in both seasons. Patterson was the first African-American to play for the Roughriders, breaking the colour barrier, like Herb Trawick.

Patterson also played professional baseball for the New York Black Yankees in 1941 and 1947, and for the Philadelphia Stars in 1947 and 1948. He had a wife and three daughters, and died in Pittsburgh in 1991 at age 72. His previously unmarked grave was marked by the Negro Leagues Baseball Grave Marker Project in 2009.
