= Rabbit Wilkins =

American baseball player

- Outfielder
- Threw: Right

Negro league baseball debut
- 1909, for the Kansas City Giants

Last appearance
- 1910, for the Kansas City Giants

Teams
- Kansas City Giants (1909–1910)

Wesley "Rabbit" Wilkins was an American Negro league outfielder in 1909 and 1910.

Wilkins made his Negro leagues debut in 1909 with the Kansas City Giants and played with the club again the following season. In three recorded games, he posted two hits in 13 plate appearances.
