= Jim Norman (baseball) =

American baseball player

- Third baseman
- Born: February 1883; Tennessee, U.S.
- Died: Unknown
- Threw: Right

Negro league baseball debut
- 1909, for the Kansas City Giants

Last appearance
- 1914, for the Chicago American Giants

Teams
- Kansas City Giants (1909, 1911); French Lick Plutos (1912–1914); Chicago American Giants (1914)

James Norman (February 1883 – death unknown), nicknamed "Big Jim", was an American Negro league third baseman in the 1910s.

A native of Tennessee, Norman made his Negro leagues debut in 1909 with the Kansas City Giants. Norman also played for the French Lick Plutos for three seasons. He then played for the Chicago American Giants in 1914.
