= John Merida =

American baseball player

- Catcher
- Born: May 1879; Spiceland, Indiana, U.S.
- Died: May 13, 1911; Kansas City, Missouri, U.S.
- Threw: Right

Negro league baseball debut
- 1907, for the Indianapolis ABCs

Last appearance
- 1911, for the Kansas City Royal Giants

Teams
- Indianapolis ABCs (1907–1909); Minneapolis Keystones (1910); Kansas City Royal Giants (1911)

John H. Merida (May 1879 – May 13, 1911), nicknamed "Snowball", was an American Negro league catcher and second baseman between 1907 and 1911.

A native of Spiceland, Indiana, Merida suited up for the Spiceland Academy (a local high school) until 1903. He was the only African American on the team during his tenure. He played semiprofessionally around East Central Indiana through 1906 (even catching former major leaguer Jot Goar on multiple occasions). A lone exception during this time was a stint Merida spent playing for Black baseball legend Bud Fowler's Cincinnati Black Tourists in 1905.

He made his Negro leagues debut in 1907 with the Indianapolis ABCs. He played three seasons with the ABCs. He was named captain and on-field manager for the ABCs during their 1908 season.

After a stint with the Minneapolis Keystones in 1910, Merida finished his career in 1911 with the Kansas City Royal Giants. Merida died of spinal meningitis in Kansas City, Missouri in 1911 at age 32.
