= Jess Turner =

American baseball player

- First baseman
- Born: July 6, 1888; Mount Sterling, Alabama, U.S.
- Threw: Right

Negro league baseball debut
- 1911, for the Kansas City Royal Giants

Last appearance
- 1917, for the All Nations

Teams
- Kansas City Royal Giants (1911–1912); Leland Giants (1914, 1916); Chicago Giants (1916); All Nations (1917)

Jess Turner (July 6, 1888 – death date unknown) was an American Negro league first baseman in the 1910s.

A native of Mount Sterling, Alabama, Turner made his Negro leagues debut in 1911 with the Kansas City Royal Giants. He went on to play for the Leland Giants, Chicago Giants, and All Nations clubs.
