= Rube Washington =

American baseball player

- Pitcher

Negro league baseball debut
- 1908, for the Indianapolis ABCs

Last appearance
- 1911, for the Kansas City Royal Giants

Teams
- Indianapolis ABCs (1908); Cuban Stars (West) (1909); Kansas City Giants (1909); Kansas City Royal Giants (1911)

Harry "Rube" Washington was an American Negro league pitcher between 1908 and 1911.

Washington made his Negro leagues debut in 1908 with the Indianapolis ABCs, and went on to play for the Cuban Stars (West), Kansas City Giants and Kansas City Royal Giants. In 13 recorded career appearances on the mound, he posted a 3.46 ERA over 96.1 innings.
