= Andrew Skinner =

American baseball player

- Pitcher
- Born: November 25, 1885; Atchison, Kansas
- Threw: Left

Negro league baseball debut
- 1909, for the Kansas City Giants

Last appearance
- 1911, for the Kansas City Giants

Teams
- Kansas City Giants (1909, 1911)

Andrew John Skinner (November 25, 1885 – death date unknown) was an American Negro league pitcher between 1909 and 1911.

A native of Atchison, Kansas, Skinner played for the Kansas City Giants in 1909 and again in 1911. In 16 recorded career appearances on the mound, he posted a 7–5 record with a 3.25 ERA over 108 innings.
