= Bill Lindsay (pitcher) =

American baseball player

- Pitcher
- Born: June 12, 1891; Lexington, Missouri, U.S.
- Died: September 1, 1914 (aged 23); Chicago, Illinois, U.S.
- Batted: Unknown Threw: Right

debut
- 1909, for the Kansas City Giants

Last appearance
- 1914, for the Chicago American Giants

Teams
- Kansas City Giants (1909–1910); Leland Giants (1910–1911); Chicago American Giants (1911–1914)

William Lindsay (June 12, 1891 – September 1, 1914), nicknamed the "Kansas Cyclone" and "Lightning", was an American Negro leagues pitcher for several years before the founding of the first Negro National League.

Lindsay started his career with the Kansas City, Kansas based Kansas City Giants at the age of 18. His death certificate states that he played ball starting at the age of 14, in 1905. He played for the Kansas City Giants for two years, then moved to the Leland Giants in 1910 where he remained until a court battle split the Leland Giants in 1910.

Lindsay moved to the Chicago American Giants, where he stayed until 1914. During the California Winter Leagues, one writer claimed Lindsay and catcher Bill Pettus were one of the best batteries "ever seen in this strip of sunshine."

Lindsay died in Chicago in 1914 at the age of 23 after he spent 9 days in Provident Hospital with what appears to have been problems with his urinary tract. The coroner's notes appear to say Uremia, which contributed to a Uremic Coma and Sepsis.

His body was taken to Charles Jackson's Chapel, where services were held, and then was returned to his birthplace, Lexington, Missouri. His pall bearers were fellow ball players Pete Booker, Bill Monroe, Bruce Petway, Frank Wickware, Jesse Barber, and Lee Wade.

Lindsay was the brother of fellow Negro leaguer Robert "Frog" Lindsay. His parents, listed on his death certificate, were Peter Lindsay and Mona Mady Lindsay. Another relative, Walter Lindsay, is listed as an informant on his death certificate. Bill Lindsay is also listed as single.

The day he died Rube Foster said of Lindsay, "I have lost a great ball player, a fine gentleman and a noble friend."
