= Sunny Jim Hamilton =

American baseball player

- Pitcher

Negro league baseball debut
- 1911, for the Kansas City Royal Giants

Last appearance
- 1911, for the Kansas City Royal Giants

Teams
- Kansas City Royal Giants (1911)

James Hamilton, nicknamed "Sunny Jim", was an American Negro league pitcher in the 1910s.

Hamilton played for the Kansas City Royal Giants in 1911. In three recorded appearances on the mound, he posted a 3.09 ERA over 11.2 innings.
