= Ray Thomas (baseball) =

American baseball player (1910–1993)

- Catcher
- Born: July 9, 1910; Dover, New Hampshire, U.S.
- Died: December 6, 1993 (aged 83); Wilson, North Carolina, U.S.
- Batted: Right Threw: Right

MLB debut
- July 22, 1938, for the Brooklyn Dodgers

Last MLB appearance
- July 22, 1938, for the Brooklyn Dodgers

MLB statistics
- Batting average: .333
- Home runs: 0
- RBI: 0
- Stats at Baseball Reference

Teams
- Brooklyn Dodgers (1938)

Raymond Joseph Thomas (July 9, 1910 – December 6, 1993) was an American Major League Baseball catcher. He played professionally for the Brooklyn Dodgers during the 1930s.

== Early life and career ==
Thomas was born in Dover, New Hampshire, and played college baseball at Western State Teachers College from 1930 to 1933.

He was signed by the St. Louis Cardinals as a free agent in 1933. He played for the Huntington Red Birds in 1934, the Houston Buffaloes in 1935 and the Cedar Rapids Kernels in 1936 and 1937. Thomas was granted free agency by the Cardinals on April 1, 1938.

Thomas was signed by the Dodgers on April 1, 1938, and played in one game for the Dodgers on July 22, 1938. He had one hit in three at-bats in that game and scored one run. He returned to the minors and played his last game for the Raleigh Capitals in 1946. He had a brief run as a manager in the minor leagues before retiring from baseball.

Thomas died on December 6, 1993, in Wilson, North Carolina.

== See also ==
- History of the Brooklyn Dodgers
