= Kansas City Royal Giants =

Professional Negro leagues baseball team

Information
- League: Independent (1910–1912)
- Location: Kansas City, Missouri
- Ballpark: Shelley Park (1910–1912)
- Established: 1910
- Disbanded: 1912

The Kansas City Royal Giants were an independent Negro leagues baseball team, based in Kansas City, Missouri, from 1910 to 1912, along with their Kansas rival, the Kansas City Giants. The Kansas City Royal Giants played home games at Shelley Park.

== History ==
The Kansas Royal Giants were owned by Kansas City businessmen M.B. Garrett and George Washington Walden, with Jack Johnson hired to manage the ballclub. Fortune J. Weaver was also an owner of the KC Royal Giants and was president of the Afro–American Realty and Investment Company. Just before the start of the 1910 season, Johnson unsuccessfully attempted to start a Negro National League, writing articles that appeared in newspapers in Chicago and other major cities. Johnson wrote: "It certainly has been proven from the big leagues on down to the minors, that there is nothing in the world that beats organized baseball and harmony..."

In beginning play, the Royal Giants ran an advertisement for local teams to play against. The address of 1005 McGee Street, Kansas City, Missouri was listed as the team business address.

The Kansas City Royal Giants began play in 1910, hosting home games at Shelley Park. In July, the Royal Giants won two against the Kansas City Giants in front of 6,00 fans at Shelley Park. Playing at Riverside Park, the Giants defeated the Royal Giants 5–2 and in September the Royal Giants lost three more games to the Kansas City Giants. The Giants were reported to have defeated the Royal Giants by scores of 8–3 and 6–0 in a doubleheader in October, 1910 at Riverside Park. "Norman" and "Sunny Jim" were the noted pitchers for the Royal Giants. The final game between the two teams in 1910 was played at Association Park, a 5–2 Giants victory, with the Giants winning $200 and half of the gate receipts. The Royal Giants' record among documented was reported to have been 4–2, while playing under manager Topeka Jack Johnson. The Kansas City Royal Giants were reported to have compiled a 5–9 record against their new rival, the Kansas City Giants.

In 1910, the Kansas City Giants released three players who attempted to play for the rival Kansas City Royal Giants in a morning game and then travel across the city to play for their own club. The players were said to have played the morning Royal Giants game and then arrived late for the second game and were released by the Giants.

After the 1910 season, friction between Jack Johnson and owner George Washington Walden led to Johnson returning to manage the rival Kansas City Royal Giants.

In 1911, the Royal Giants played under manager Robert Boone with a 3–9 record among documented games. In June 1911, the Kansas City Royal Giants played a three–game series against the Kansas City Giants. The Giants were noted have swept the series, defeating the Royal Giants by the scores of 11–2, 4–1 and 8–7.

On May 13, 1911, it was reported Royal Giants player John Merida died of a heart attack.

In June 1911, Royal Giants' owner Fortune Weaver wrote to the Indianapolis Freeman newspaper in regard to unstable teams and the need for an organized Negro league. Weaver wrote: "Without a league Negro baseball is bound to go down. There are too many would-be managers and too many unreliable players." Weaver cited a Pekin Tigers of Cleveland team that had folded and did not play a scheduled series in Kansas City and the French Lick Plutos from French Lick, Indiana, who also did not show for their series in Kansas City. "Now, this kind of business is killing Negro baseball." Weaver concluded. "I am informed that other team managers are having the same trouble with teams they have booked. I tell you, boys, there is only one remedy for these troubles, and that is the Negro League." It was noted that in 1911, the Royal Giants picked up players who jumped from the Pensacola Giants team while they were in Kansas City, which led the Pensacola club to disband.

After the 1911 season, Kansas City Giants player and former Royal Giants player Dee Williams was shot to death in Kansas City and the Kansas City Giants continued play, but as a semi–pro barnstorming level team with a depleted roster. Topeka Jack Johnson then returned to the Kansas City Royal Giants in 1912, with Johnson and George Washington Walden resolving their differences.

The Kansas City Royal Giants played their final season in 1912, continuing as an independent club. Playing again under Jack Johnson, the Royal Giants finished with a 3–2 record in documented games.

Following the 1912 season, a Kansas City Royal Giants team played in 1916 thorough the 1920s as a semi–professional Negro leagues team.

In 2016, it was reported that the Society for American Baseball Research (SABR) dedicated a new grave marker for "Topeka Jack" Johnson at Mount Auburn Cemetery in Topeka, Kansas.

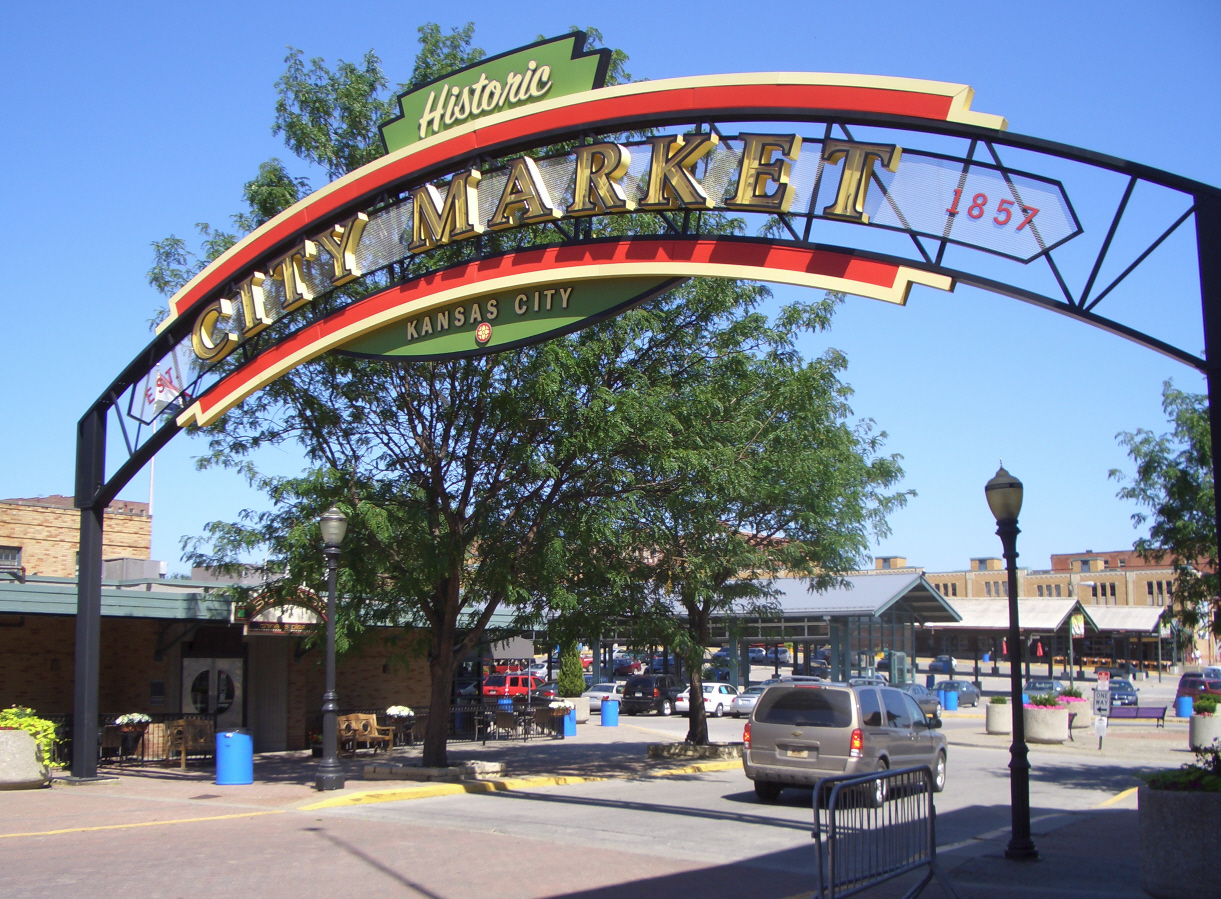
(2008) City Market Entrance. River Market Neighborhood. Kansas City, Missouri

== The ballpark ==
The Kansas City Royal Giants teams from 1910 to 1912 hosted home games at Shelley Park. Shelley Park was located at Oak Street (west); Missouri Avenue (north); Locust Lane (east); Independence Avenue (south) in the River Market Neighborhood, Kansas City, Missouri. The site had previously served as a city graveyard beginning in the 1840s, before namesake mayor George M. Shelley and the city park board had the graveyard condemned, moved and the site turned into a park. Today, the ballpark location is home to a fire station and the I-35 & Hwy 9 interchange.

== Timeline ==
Year(s)	# Yrs.	Team	Level	League	Ballpark
1910–1912	3	Kansas City Royal Giants	Negro minor leagues	Independent	Shelley Park

== Year–by–year records ==
Year	Record	Finish	Manager	Playoffs/Notes
1910	4–2	2nd	"Topeka Jack" Johnson	No playoffs held
1911	3–9	11th	Robert Boone	No playoffs held
1912	3–2	2nd	"Topeka Jack" Johnson	No playoffs held

== Notable alumni ==
- Otto Bolden (1912)
- Robert Boone (1911, MGR)
- Andrew Campbell (1910)
- Red Foster (1911)
- Willie Green (1911)
- Sunny Jim Hamilton (1911)
- Chick Harper (1912)
- Son Hatten (1911)
- Ashes Jackson (1912)
- Guy Jackson (1911–1912)
- "Topeka Jack" Johnson (1910, 1912 MGR)
- Hurley McNair (1912)
- John Merida (1911)
- Eugene Milliner (1910, 1912)
- Johnny Pugh (1911)
- Tom Stirman (1910–1912)
- Arthur Tiller (1911)
- Albert Toney (1910)
- Jess Turner (1911–1912)
- Rube Washington (1911)
- Dee Williams (1910)

== See also ==
- Kansas City Royal Giants players
- Sports in Kansas City
- Negro Leagues Baseball Museum
- List of minor Negro league baseball teams
