= Rosey Davis (baseball) =

American baseball player (1904–1968)

- Pitcher
- Born: November 19, 1904; Bartlesville, Oklahoma, U.S.
- Died: December 28, 1968 (aged 64); Chicago, Illinois, U.S.
- Batted: Right Threw: Right

Negro league baseball debut
- 1924, for the St. Louis Stars

Last appearance
- 1945, for the Cleveland Buckeyes

Negro National League I, East–West League, Negro National League II, & Negro American League statistics
- Win–loss record: 96–62
- Earned run average: 4.07
- Strikeouts: 672
- Stats at Baseball Reference

Teams
- St. Louis Stars (1924–1932); Chicago American Giants (1929); Kansas City Monarchs (1930); Indianapolis ABCs (1931); Pollock's Cuban Stars (1932); Cleveland Stars (1932); Columbus Blue Birds (1933); Pittsburgh Crawfords (1934–1935); New York Black Yankees (1936–1938); Pittsburgh Crawfords (1937); Newark Eagles (1938); Carta Blanca (1939); Memphis Red Sox (1939–1940); New York Black Yankees (1940); Cincinnati/Cincinnati-Indianapolis Clowns (1943–1945); Cleveland Buckeyes (1945)

Career highlights and awards
- Negro American League ERA leader (1945); Negro National League I wins leader (1925)

Roosevelt "Rosey" Davis (November 19, 1904 – December 28, 1968) was an American professional baseball pitcher in the Negro leagues and the Mexican League from the 1920s to the 1940s.

== Biography ==
A native of Bartlesville, Oklahoma, Davis made his Negro leagues debut with the St. Louis Stars in 1924. Known for his spitball and emery ball, he enjoyed a career that lasted over 20 years. Davis died in Chicago, Illinois in 1968 at age 64. His grave was marked by the Negro Leagues Baseball Grave Marker Project in 2005.
