= Tullie McAdoo =

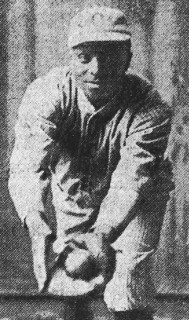
- First baseman
- Born: November 24, 1884; Topeka, Kansas, U.S.
- Died: June 16, 1961; Chicago, Illinois, U.S.
- Batted: Left Threw: Right

debut
- 1908, for the Kansas City Giants

Last appearance
- 1924, for the St. Louis Giants (1924)

Teams
- Kansas City Giants (1908); Oklahoma Monarchs (1910); Kansas City Royal Giants (1910); Salt Lake City Occidentals (1910–1911); St. Louis Giants/Stars (1911–1913, 1915–1917, 1919–1923); Chicago Giants (1914); San Francisco Park (1915); Cleveland Browns (1924); St. Louis Giants (1924) (1924)

Tullie McAdoo (November 24, 1884 – June 16, 1961) was an American professional baseball first baseman in the Negro leagues. He played from 1908 to 1924 with several teams, playing mostly with the St. Louis Giants.

McAdoo played the first part of the 1910 season for the Oklahoma Monarchs, however, he and two other players, third baseman J. Norman and outfielder D. Williams, were given unconditional releases from their contracts when they broke club rules by playing a morning baseball game for the Kansas City Royal Giants on the morning of July 4, 1910. The afternoon game was delayed due to their lateness. By the end of the month, McAdoo was playing with the Kansas City Royal Giants.

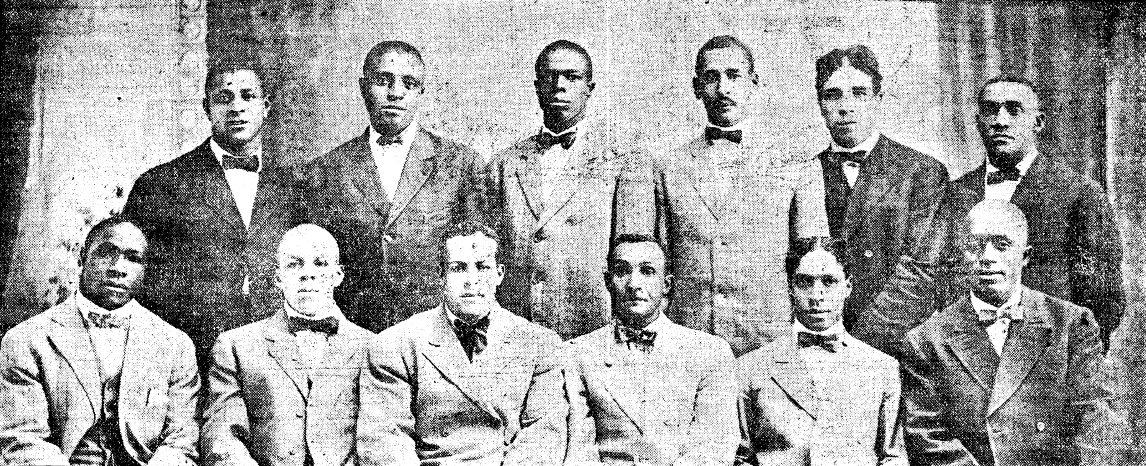
1910 Salt Lake Occidentals

McAdoo worked first base for the Salt Lake City Occidental Club in 1910. The team finished second that year in the Utah state league. He moved back east to join the French Lick Plutos for the 1911 season, but came back to the Occidentals in May 1911. At some point in 1911, McAdoo moved East again to join the St. Louis Giants.

He was still playing for the St. Louis Giants when the team joined the Negro National League in 1920.
