= Charlie Uhlir =

American baseball player (1912–1984)

- Outfielder
- Born: July 30, 1912; Chicago, Illinois, U.S.
- Died: July 9, 1984 (aged 71); Spirit Lake, Iowa, U.S.
- Batted: Left Threw: Left

MLB debut
- August 3, 1934, for the Chicago White Sox

Last MLB appearance
- September 22, 1934, for the Chicago White Sox

MLB statistics
- Batting average: .148
- Hits: 4
- Stats at Baseball Reference

Teams
- Chicago White Sox (1934)

Charles Karel Uhlir (July 30, 1912 – July 9, 1984) was an American professional baseball outfielder who played in Major League Baseball for one season. He played with the Chicago White Sox for 14 games during the 1934 Chicago White Sox season.
