= Lawrence Farley =

American baseball player (1856–1910)

- Outfielder
- Born: August 1856; Seneca Falls, New York, U.S.
- Died: October 6, 1910 (aged 54); Kansas City, Missouri, U.S.
- Batted: Unknown Threw: Unknown

MLB debut
- June 24, 1884, for the Washington Nationals

Last MLB appearance
- July 12, 1884, for the Washington Nationals

MLB statistics
- Batting average: .212
- Home runs: 0
- Runs batted in: 0
- Stats at Baseball Reference

Teams
- Washington Nationals (1884)

Lawrence Farley (August 1856 – October 6, 1910) was an American Major League Baseball outfielder. He played in fourteen games for the 1884 Washington Nationals and recorded 11 hits in 52 at-bats. He later managed the San Antonio club of the Texas League for part of the 1898 season.

== Sources ==
- Career statistics from Baseball Reference · Retrosheet · Baseball Almanac
