= Dallas Carter (baseball) =

American baseball player

- Infielder
- Born: February 14, 1888; Louisville, Kentucky, U.S.
- Died: April 20, 1942 (aged 54); Chicago, Illinois, U.S.
- Threw: Right

Negro league baseball debut
- 1910, for the New York Black Sox

Last appearance
- 1914, for the Louisville White Sox

Teams
- New York Black Sox (1910); Louisville White Sox (1914)

Dallas C. Carter (February 14, 1888 – April 20, 1942) was an American Negro league infielder in the 1910s.

A native of Louisville, Kentucky, Carter played for the New York Black Sox in 1910, and for the Louisville White Sox in 1914. He died in Chicago, Illinois in 1942 at age 54.
