= Bob Boken =

American baseball player (1908–1988)

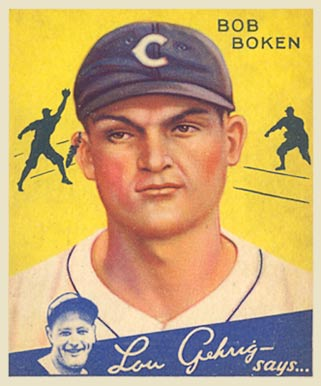
- Infielder
- Born: February 23, 1908; Maryville, Illinois, U.S.
- Died: October 8, 1988 (aged 80); Las Vegas, Nevada, U.S.
- Batted: Right Threw: Right

MLB debut
- April 25, 1933, for the Washington Senators

Last MLB appearance
- September 30, 1934, for the Chicago White Sox

MLB statistics
- Batting average: .247
- Home runs: 6
- Runs batted in: 47
- Stats at Baseball Reference

Teams
- Washington Senators (1933–34); Chicago White Sox (1934)

Robert Anthony Boken (February 23, 1908 – October 8, 1988) was an American professional baseball infielder in Major League Baseball. Boken played for the Washington Senators (1933–34) and the Chicago White Sox (1934).

== Biography ==
Boken (of Lithuanian descent) was born in Maryville, Illinois and played youth ball in the Maryville Little League. He was on the Senators rosters for the 1933 World Series but did not appear in any of its games.

The Senators were the surprise team of 1933, breaking a seven-year monopoly on the AL title jointly held by the New York Yankees and Philadelphia Athletics from 1926 to 1932. Led by future Hall of Famer Joe Cronin, the Senators amassed a 99–53 record and theIr first pennant in eight years, besting the Babe Ruth- and Lou Gehrig-led New York Yankees by seven games.

Boken's first game on April 25, 1933, had him coming in to relieve Joe Cronin at SS, in a home game against the New York Yankees. Boken had one AB and didn't reach the bases in a game where Ruth and Gehrig combined with 4 hits and 5 RBIs to trounce the Senators 16 to 0.

Boken next appeared on April 29, 1933, in Yankee Stadium in relief of John Kerr at 2B. This time, he produced 1 H w 1 RBI in his two AB, contributing to a 6–3 win where Ruth and Gehrig were held to 3 hits and no RBIs on 8 combined AB.

Boken followed that performance on April 30 at Home (Griffith Field) vs Philadelphia, again in relief of Kerr at 2B, and again producing 1 H with 1 RBI in 2 AB.

His first start was at 2B on May 7 in a 9–10 loss to the Tigers in Detroit, going .500 on 6 AB.

In 147 games over two seasons in the major leagues, Boken posted a .247 batting average (113-for-457) with 54 runs, 6 home runs and 72 RBI. Defensively, he recorded an overall .931 fielding percentage.

In addition to his time in the major leagues, Boken had an extensive minor league career, playing from 1929 to 1947. His lifetime production was notable, amassing 1,787 hits, 149 HRs and 232 RBIs across 1,710 games and 5,969 at bats. He achieved a .299 lifetime average and .452 slugging percentage.

Hall of Famer Ralph Kiner, one of the game's premier power hitters, referenced Boken in his HOF induction speech in 1975:

"Going back to my early days, I have to mention a fellow by the name of Bob Boken who is the man who got me started playing baseball. And his son was about four years older than I, and he used to pitch to his son across the street and I’d go out in the outfield and shag the balls. This went on for about a year and I finally got a chance to bat and I realized what a great game this was."

Maryville Little League renamed Khoury League Field No. 2 in Boken's honor on opening day, May 3, 2012.

For a more detailed view of his lifetime statistics, use this link to refer to StatsCrew.com.
