= William Tenny =

American baseball player

- Catcher

Negro league baseball debut
- 1909, for the Kansas City Giants

Last appearance
- 1912, for the French Lick Plutos

Teams
- Kansas City Giants (1909–1911); French Lick Plutos (1912)

William Tenny was an American Negro league catcher between 1909 and 1912.

Tenny played for the Kansas City Giants from 1909 to 1911, and for the French Lick Plutos in 1912. In 47 recorded career games, he posted 59 hits in 203 plate appearances.
