= John Pomorski =

American baseball player (1905–1977)

- Pitcher
- Born: December 30, 1905; Brooklyn, New York, U.S.
- Died: December 6, 1977 (aged 71); Brampton, Ontario, Canada
- Batted: Right Threw: Right

MLB debut
- April 17, 1934, for the Chicago White Sox

Last MLB appearance
- May 5, 1934, for the Chicago White Sox

MLB statistics
- Win–loss record: 0-0
- Earned run average: 5.40
- Strikeouts: 0
- Stats at Baseball Reference

Teams
- Chicago White Sox (1934)

John Leon Pomorski (December 30, 1905 – December 6, 1977) was an American professional baseball pitcher in Major League Baseball. He played for the Chicago White Sox in 1934.

On September 7, 1947, he pitched a complete game 20-inning tie at the age of 41 years old while playing for the St-Maurice de Thetford Mines of the Eastern Townships Independent Intermediate League in a game against the Les Forestiers Catholiques de Drummondville in Canada.
