= Guy Jackson (baseball) =

American baseball player

- Pitcher
- Born: 1882
- Died: Unknown
- Batted: Right Threw: Right

Negro league baseball debut
- 1909, for the Illinois Giants

Last appearance
- 1915, for the Chicago Giants

Teams
- Illinois Giants (1909); Chicago Union Giants (1911); Kansas City Royal Giants (1912-1913); Chicago Giants (1912–1913); Lincoln Stars (1914); Schenectady Mohawk Giants (1914); Chicago Giants (1915)

Guy Jackson (1882 – death unknown) was an American Negro league pitcher in the 1910s.

Jackson made his Negro leagues debut in 1909 with the Illinois Giants before playing with the Chicago Union Giants in 1911. In the following two seasons, he played for the Chicago Giants. Jackson spent 1914 with the Lincoln Stars, then finished his career in 1915 back with the Chicago Giants.
