= Frog Lindsay =

American baseball player

- Shortstop
- Born: March 6, 1885; Lexington, Missouri, U.S.
- Died: December 16, 1964 (aged 79); Columbia, Missouri, U.S.
- Threw: Right

Negro league baseball debut
- 1909, for the Kansas City Giants

Last appearance
- 1910, for the Kansas City Giants

Teams
- Kansas City Giants (1909–1910)

Robert Alexander "Frog" Lindsay (March 6, 1885 – December 16, 1964) was an American Negro league shortstop in 1909 and 1910.

A native of Lexington, Missouri, Lindsay was the brother of fellow Negro leaguer Bill Lindsay. He played for the Kansas City Giants in 1909 and 1910. Lindsay died in Columbia, Missouri in 1964 at age 79.
