= Guy Ousley =

American baseball player

- Shortstop
- Born: July 14, 1910; Valdosta, Georgia, U.S.
- Died: February 28, 1964 (aged 53); Chicago, Illinois, U.S.
- Threw: Right

Negro league baseball debut
- 1931, for the Chicago American Giants

Last appearance
- 1932, for the Baltimore Elite Giants

Teams
- Chicago American Giants (1931); Louisville Black Caps (1932); Memphis Red Sox (1932)

Guy Carswell Ousley (July 14, 1910 – February 28, 1964) was an American Negro league shortstop in the 1930s.

== Early life and career ==
A native of Valdosta, Georgia, Ousley made his Negro leagues debut in 1931 with the Chicago American Giants, and played the following season with the Louisville Black Caps and Memphis Red Sox. He died in Chicago, Illinois in 1964 at age 53. His previously unmarked grave was marked by the Negro Leagues Baseball Grave Marker Project in 2005.
