= Mark Mauldin =

American baseball player (1914–1990)

- Third baseman
- Born: November 5, 1914; Atlanta, Georgia, U.S.
- Died: September 2, 1990 (aged 75); Union City, Georgia, U.S.
- Batted: Right Threw: Right

MLB debut
- September 10, 1934, for the Chicago White Sox

Last MLB appearance
- September 30, 1934, for the Chicago White Sox

MLB statistics
- Batting average: .263
- Home runs: 1
- Runs batted in: 3
- Stats at Baseball Reference

Teams
- Chicago White Sox (1934)

Marshall Reese Mauldin (November 5, 1914 – September 2, 1990) was an American professional baseball third baseman in Major League Baseball. He played for the Chicago White Sox in 1934.
