= Marty Hopkins =

American baseball player (1907–1963)

- Third baseman
- Born: February 22, 1907; Wolfe City, Texas, U.S.
- Died: November 20, 1963 (aged 56); Dallas, Texas, U.S.
- Batted: Right Threw: Right

MLB debut
- April 17, 1934, for the Philadelphia Phillies

Last MLB appearance
- September 22, 1935, for the Chicago White Sox

MLB statistics
- Batting average: .211
- Home runs: 4
- Runs batted in: 48
- Stats at Baseball Reference

Teams
- Philadelphia Phillies (1934); Chicago White Sox (1934–35)

Meredith Hilliard Hopkins (February 22, 1907 - November 20, 1963) was an American professional baseball player in Major League Baseball. He played two seasons in the majors as a reserve infielder, mostly at third base. He debuted in 1934 for the Philadelphia Phillies. Hopkins was sent to the minor league St. Paul Saints a month into the season, then was acquired by the Chicago White Sox in June. He spent the rest of 1934 and all of 1935 with the White Sox, finishing his major league career.

== Sources ==
- Career statistics from Baseball Reference · Baseball Reference (Minors) · Retrosheet · Baseball Almanac
