= William Sloan (baseball) =

American baseball player

- Outfielder / Pitcher
- Born: September 27, 1886; Dayton, Ohio, U.S.
- Died: June 3, 1931 (aged 44); Dayton, Ohio, U.S.
- Threw: Left

Negro league baseball debut
- 1908, for the Cleveland Giants

Last appearance
- 1914, for the Dayton Marcos
- Stats at Baseball Reference

Teams
- Cleveland Giants (1908); Illinois Giants (1909); Kansas City Giants (1909); Leland Giants (1909); Dayton Marcos (1910-1914)

William George Sloan (September 27, 1886 – June 3, 1931) was an American Negro league outfielder and pitcher in the 1900s.

Sloan was a native of Dayton, Ohio.

== Negro league career ==
In 1908, Sloan was on the pitching staff of the semi-pro Cleveland Giants. In 1909, Sloan played for at least 4 teams: the Cuban Stars of Havana, Illinois Giants, Kansas City Giants, and Leland Giants in 1909. In five recorded games, he posted six hits in 20 plate appearances.

=== Dayton Marcos ===
In 1910, Sloan returned to his hometown and served as team captain of the Dayton Marcos. In 1912, Sloan and owner/manager John Matthews had a brief dispute and he was briefly benched, returning in August and remaining on the pitching staff through 1914.

== Dayton flood of 1913 ==
During the Great Dayton Flood of 1913, Sloan, also an employee at the Kuhns Brothers Foundry in the offseason, walked to the nearby Dayton D Handle Company and asked for permission to use their small boat to rescue residents trapped in the flood waters. When the owner refused, Sloan produced a handgun and commandeered the boat with two other men. Over 3 days, Sloan rescued at least 317 people including his own 1-year-old son James and Leroy Crandall, the owner of the boat. For his efforts, Sloan was recommended for the Carnegie Medal.

== Injury and retirement ==
In 1914, Sloan was injured in a work accident when he was stuck under an elevator on a construction site. He was hospitalized with a bruised stomach and hips. Sloan never returned to the Marcos.

== Death and legacy ==
Sloan died in Dayton, Ohio in 1931 at age 44 and buried in an unmarked grave at Woodland Cemetery in Dayton. In 1997, he was depicted in the play "1913-The Great Dayton Flood" at Wright State University. The play was revived in 2013. A historic marker detailing Sloan's role in the 1913 flood was erected on the banks of the Great Miami River in Dayton. In 2013, an anonymous Good Samaritan donated and placed a headstone on Sloan's grave.
