= Bill Pettus =

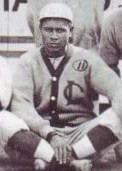
- First baseman
- Born: August 13, 1884; Goliad County, Texas, U.S.
- Died: August 22, 1924 (aged 40); New York, New York, U.S.
- Batted: Right Threw: Right

debut
- 1902, for the Albuquerque, New Mexico

Last appearance
- 1923, for the Harrisburg Giants

Teams
- Albuquerque, New Mexico (1902–1903, 1905–1906); San Francisco, California (1904); Oakland, California (1904); Santa Fe, New Mexico Salmon Grays (1907–1908); Occidental Club (1908–1910); Kansas City Giants (1909); Chicago Giants (1910–1911, 1917); Habana (1911–1912); New York Lincoln Giants (1912, 1916–1920); Chicago American Giants (1912–1913); Brooklyn Royal Giants (1913–1918); New York Lincoln Stars (1914–1916); Philadelphia All-Stars (1917); Atlantic City Bacharach Giants (1917–1918, 1921); Hilldale Club (1917–1918); Philadelphia Giants (1918); Richmond Giants (1922); Harrisburg Giants (1923)

William Thomas Pettus (August 13, 1884 – August 22, 1924) was an American professional baseball first baseman in the Cuban League and Negro leagues. He played from 1902 to 1923 with several teams.

== Career ==
Pettus began playing baseball in 1902 for the Albuquerque, New Mexico team, staying there until the end of the 1903 season. He often went by the nickname "Zack" Pettus.

In addition to baseball, in his twenties, Pettus made money boxing and working in the coal mine near Madrid, New Mexico.

Pitcher Babe Adams said of Pettus's early days, he was "one of the best catchers in the baseball world."

In 1904, Pettus played on the white teams of San Francisco and Oakland California, and was the only black player on those teams.

In 1905, he returned to Albuquerque, New Mexico to manage and captain the team, which was made up of ten Mexicans and two colored ball players. The team won 48 out of 49 games, losing only one.

In 1906, Pettus again was the only black player on a white team when he played for the Albuquerque, New Mexico team.

In 1907 and 1908, Pettus caught for the Santa Fe, New Mexico Salmon Grays.

During 1908–1909 he played for the Occidental Club, a black baseball team in Los Angeles, California.

In 1909, Pettus played first base for the Kansas City Giants. At the end of that year, he re-joined the Occidental Club in Los Angeles.

In 1910, Pettus joined the Chicago Giants, a Frank Leland team that had recently broken off of the Leland Giants after a legal battle over naming rights. Pettus would play there for two seasons, touring much of the upper midwest.

He played winter ball in the 1911–1912 season for Habana, and returned to split the season between the Brooklyn Royal Giants and the New York Lincoln Stars where he played on and off until 1916, continuing on in this way playing on and off with the Lincoln Giants until 1920.

== Death ==
Pettus died on August 22, 1924, in New York City at the age of 40. He is buried at the Mt. Olivet Cemetery in New York, New York.
