= Harry Kinzy =

American baseball player (1910–2003)

- Pitcher
- Born: July 19, 1910; Hallsville, Texas, U.S.
- Died: June 22, 2003 (aged 92); Fort Worth, Texas, U.S.
- Batted: Right Threw: Right

MLB debut
- June 8, 1934, for the Chicago White Sox

Last MLB appearance
- September 26, 1934, for the Chicago White Sox

MLB statistics
- Win–loss record: 0-1
- Earned run average: 4.98
- Strikeouts: 12
- Stats at Baseball Reference

Teams
- Chicago White Sox (1934)

Harry "Slim" Hersel Kinzy (July 19, 1910 – June 22, 2003) was an American professional baseball pitcher in Major League Baseball. He played for the Chicago White Sox.

== Biography ==
Kinzy was born in Hallsville, Texas, and played college baseball at Texas Christian University. He played his first MLB game on June 8, 1934, with the Chicago White Sox. Kinzy pitched in the majors for one season, appearing in 13 games, making two starts.

Kinzy died on June 22, 2003, in Fort Worth, Texas.
