= Robert Gaston =

American baseball player (1910-2000)

- Catcher
- Born: March 19, 1910; Chattanooga, Tennessee, U.S.
- Died: February 11, 2000 (aged 89); Pittsburgh, Pennsylvania, U.S.
- Batted: Right Threw: Right

Negro league baseball debut
- 1932, for the Homestead Grays

Last appearance
- 1948, for the Homestead Grays
- Stats at Baseball Reference

Teams
- Homestead Grays (1933, 1935, 1939–1945, 1947–1948); Brooklyn Brown Dodgers (1946)

Robert Roy "Rab Roy" Gaston (March 19, 1910 – February 11, 2000) was an American professional baseball catcher in the Negro leagues. He played from 1932 to 1948, mostly with the Homestead Grays. He spent the majority of his career as the backup catcher to Josh Gibson.
