= Dee Williams (baseball) =

American baseball player (1884–1911)

- Outfielder
- Born: May 1884; Topeka, Kansas, U.S.
- Died: December 23, 1911 (aged 27); Kansas City, Kansas, U.S.

Negro league baseball debut
- 1909, for the Buxton Wonders

Last appearance
- 1911, for the Kansas City Giants
- Stats at Baseball Reference

Teams
- Buxton Wonders (1909); Kansas City Giants (1909); Kansas City Royal Giants (1910); Kansas City Giants (1911)

Dee Williams (May 1884 – December 23, 1911) was an American Negro league outfielder between 1909 and 1911.

A native of Topeka, Kansas, Williams played for the Buxton Wonders and the Kansas City Giants in 1909, and continued to play for Kansas City through 1911, playing for the Kansas City Royal Giants in 1910, returning to the Kansas City Giants for the 1911 season. He died in Kansas City, Kansas in 1911 at age 27.
