= George Caithamer =

American baseball player (1910–1954)

- Catcher
- Born: July 22, 1910; Chicago, Illinois, U.S.
- Died: June 1, 1954 (aged 43); Chicago, Illinois, U.S.
- Batted: Right Threw: Right

MLB debut
- September 17, 1934, for the Chicago White Sox

Last MLB appearance
- September 30, 1934, for the Chicago White Sox

MLB statistics
- Batting average: .316
- Hits: 6
- Runs batted in: 3
- Stats at Baseball Reference

Teams
- Chicago White Sox (1934)

George Theodore Caithamer (July 22, 1910 – June 1, 1954) was an American professional baseball catcher in Major League Baseball. He played in five games for the Chicago White Sox in 1934. He recorded 6 hits and 0 home runs, but put up an impressive .316 batting average. He died at age 43 in 1954.
