= Bill Norman (footballer) =

Australian rules footballer

Personal information
- Full name: William John Norman
- Born: 26 August 1926
- Died: 2 November 2017 (aged 91)
- Original team: Noble Park
- Height: 183 cm (6 ft 0 in)
- Weight: 81 kg (179 lb)

Playing career^{1}
Years	Club	Games (Goals)
1950	Hawthorn	5 (0)
- ^{1} Playing statistics correct to the end of 1950.

William John Norman (26 August 1926 – 2 November 2017) was an Australian rules footballer who played with Hawthorn in the Victorian Football League (VFL).

In 1951 he moved to VFA side Moorabbin before returning to Noble Park later in the season.
