= Frenchy Uhalt =

American baseball player (1910–2004)

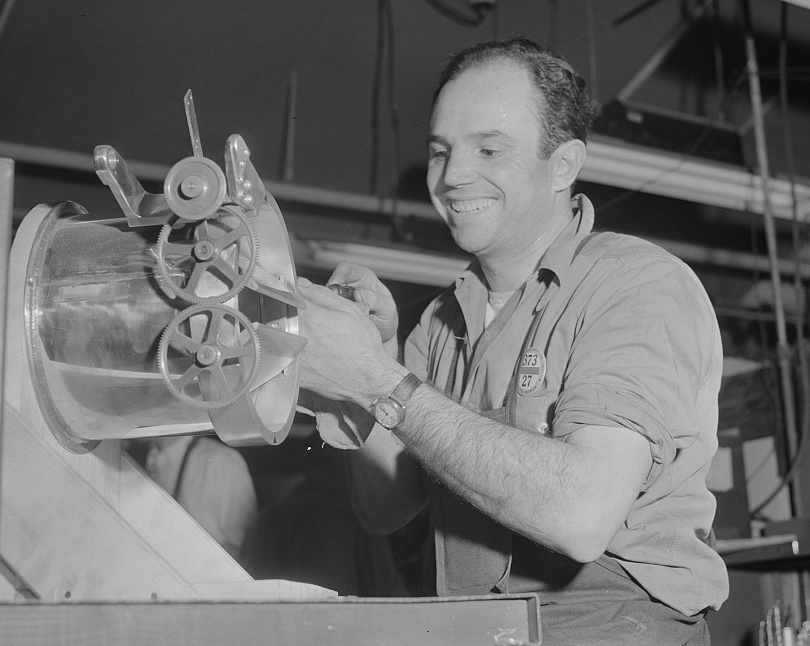
- Outfielder
- Born: April 27, 1910; Bakersfield, California, U.S.
- Died: September 3, 2004 (aged 94); Walnut Creek, California, U.S.
- Batted: Left Threw: Right

MLB debut
- April 17, 1934, for the Chicago White Sox

Last MLB appearance
- July 1, 1934, for the Chicago White Sox

MLB statistics
- Batting average: .242
- Home runs: 0
- Runs batted in: 16
- Stats at Baseball Reference

Teams
- Chicago White Sox (1934)

Bernard Bartholomew "Frenchy" Uhalt (April 27, 1910 – September 3, 2004) was an American Major League Baseball outfielder. He played in 57 games for the Chicago White Sox in 1934.

Uhalt was much better known, however, for his long career in the Pacific Coast League, where he played all or part of 20 seasons, between 1928 and 1948. In the PCL, he played for the Oakland Oaks (1928–36 and 1948), Hollywood Stars (1938–42) and San Francisco Seals (1943–47). He also spent a season and a half with the American Association Milwaukee Brewers. In 1949, he served as player-manager for the Fresno Cardinals.

Overall, Uhalt had over 3,000 hits in the minors, with a batting average of .300. He is a member of the Pacific Coast League Hall of Fame.
