= Jelly Taylor =

American baseball player (1910–1976)

- First baseman
- Born: July 10, 1910; London, Ohio, U.S.
- Died: October 1, 1976 (aged 66); Cleveland, Ohio, U.S.
- Batted: Left Threw: Left

Negro league baseball debut
- 1934, for the Cincinnati Tigers

Last appearance
- 1946, for the Memphis Red Sox
- Managerial record at Baseball Reference

Teams
- Cincinnati Tigers (1934, 1937); Memphis Red Sox (1938–1942, 1946)

Olan "Jelly" Taylor (July 10, 1910 – October 1, 1976) was an American professional baseball first baseman in the Negro leagues. He played for the Cincinnati Tigers in 1934 and 1937 and the Memphis Red Sox from 1938 to 1942, and again in 1946. Taylor was selected to three East-West All-Star Games. He served in the United States Army during World War II.

== Pro career ==
Taylor made his professional debut for the Cincinnati Tigers, becoming the team's starting first baseman in the franchise's first and only season as a Negro league ball club. During his rookie year, Taylor led the team with 349 putouts and batted .275. After the Tigers ceased operations, Taylor followed manager Ted Radcliffe over to Memphis and became a member of the Memphis Red Sox. As a member of the league champion Red Sox, Taylor batted .296 and drove in 16 runs. Taylor remained the regular first baseman for Memphis for the next several years, ever after catcher Larry Brown replaced Radcliffe as the team's player manager.

In 1943, Taylor was replaced at first with Jim Canada. Taylor missed the 1944 season, having enlisted in the military, but returned in 1945. In 1946, Taylor was not only the regular first baseman for Memphis, but he was also the team's manager. After the team started 8-18-1, Ruben Jones was fired and Taylor, at the age of 35. Memphis went 28-22-1 the rest of the season, finishing 34-38-2. Despite the strong finish, Taylor was not named the manager for the 1947 season. Instead, the club brought back Brown to manage the team. Taylor then retired from baseball.

Taylor was a three-time all-star in the Negro Leagues, 1939, 1940 and 1941. He had 28 hits in 1940, good enough for sixth in the league. In 1937, he had the best fielding percentage and finished third in 1937 and 1938 in putouts. In both of those seasons he ranked as one of the league leaders in turned double plays as well.
