= Paul Hardy (baseball) =

American baseball player (1910–1979)

- Catcher
- Born: September 17, 1910; Meridian, Mississippi, U.S.
- Died: August 28, 1979 (aged 68); Chicago, Illinois, U.S.
- Batted: Right Threw: Right

Negro league baseball debut
- 1931, for the Montgomery Grey Sox

Last appearance
- 1945, for the Birmingham Black Barons
- Stats at Baseball Reference

Teams
- Montgomery Grey Sox (1931–1932); Indianapolis ABCs/Detroit Stars (1933); Nashville Elite Giants (1934); Birmingham Black Barons (1934, 1940–1943, 1945); Columbus Elite Giants (1935); Chicago American Giants (1937–1938); Kansas City Monarchs (1939)

Paul James Hardy (September 17, 1910 – August 28, 1979) was an American professional baseball catcher in the Negro leagues. He played from 1932 to 1945 with several teams.

== Biography ==
Hardy's grave at Burr Oak Cemetery

A native of Meridian, Mississippi, Hardy served in the US Army during World War II. He died in Chicago, Illinois in 1979 at age 68, and was buried at Burr Oak Cemetery in Alsip.
