= Joe Chamberlain (baseball) =

American baseball player (1910–1983)

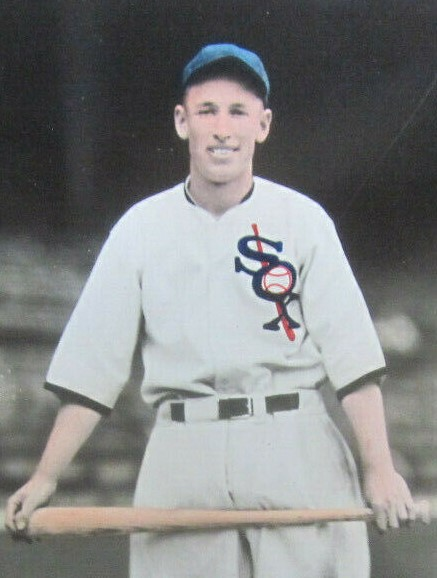
- Shortstop/Third baseman
- Born: May 10, 1910; San Francisco, California, U.S.
- Died: January 28, 1983 (aged 72); San Francisco, California, U.S.
- Batted: Right Threw: Right

MLB debut
- April 17, 1934, for the Chicago White Sox

Last MLB appearance
- July 8, 1934, for the Chicago White Sox

MLB statistics
- Batting average: .241
- Home runs: 2
- Runs batted in: 17
- Stats at Baseball Reference

Teams
- Chicago White Sox (1934)

Joseph Jeremiah Chamberlain (May 10, 1910 – January 28, 1983) was an American professional baseball shortstop and third baseman in Major League Baseball. He played for the Chicago White Sox in 1934.

Chamberlain died on January 28, 1983. He was interred at Holy Cross Cemetery in Colma, California.
