= Oklahoma Monarchs =

Negro league baseball team (1910)

Information
- League: Independent, 1910
- Location: Oklahoma City, Oklahoma
- Ballpark: Colcord Park
- Established: 1910
- Disbanded: 1910

The Oklahoma Monarchs were a Negro league baseball team in the Western Independent Clubs in 1910 based in Oklahoma City, Oklahoma. They played their home games at Colcord Park.

The club featured future Baseball Hall of Famer Louis Santop along with Sam Bennett and Bingo DeMoss.
