= Kansas City Giants =

American Negro league baseball team

Information
- League: Independent (1909–1911)
- Location: Kansas City, Kansas
- Ballpark: Riverside Park (1909–1911)
- Established: 1909
- Disbanded: 1911

The Kansas City Giants were an independent Negro leagues baseball team, based in Kansas City, Kansas, from 1909 to 1911. The Kansas City Giants played home games at Riverside Park. The Giants were a rival of the Kansas City, Missouri based Kansas City Royal Giants.

== History ==
Tobe Smith and Felix Payne were co–owners of the team, which evolved from a semi–pro, barnstorming team of the same name, which began play in 1907.

When the Giants turned fully professional, Kansas City Giants owner Tobe Smith signed numerous local players who had played for the Jenkins and Sons and a Kansas City Monarchs semi-pro teams.

In their first season of "league" play, the 1909 Kansas City Giants were noted to have a record of 12–12 within the Western Independent Clubs, placing 5th among those teams. "Topeka Jack" Johnson was the manager of the Giants. Counting all games in 1909, it was reported the Giants compiled an overall record of 128–19.

Beginning on August 25, 1909, Rube Foster and his Leland Giants team played a three–game series at Riverside Park. The Kansas City Journal labeled the series as the "Colored Championship of the United States" with the winning team receiving a $1,000 purse. Leland won the first game 5–0, with Kansas City winning the second game 3–1, as Bill Lindsay struck out 16. In front of 5,000 fans on August 27, 1909, Kansas City won the third game 3–2.

Player/manager "Topeka Jack" Johnson was a former professional boxer, known to have been a boxing sparring partner of heavyweight champion Jack Johnson. In the winter of 1909, Johnson helped form the Kansas City Royal Giants Negro league team in Kansas City, Missouri. The Royal Giants began play in the 1910 season, immediately becoming a local rival of the Kansas City Giants.

The Kansas City Giants continued play in 1910. Their record among documented games was reported to have been 6–7. The new manager for the Giants was Jim Norman. The Kansas City Giants were documented to have compiled a 9–5 record against their new rival, the Kansas City Royal Giants. In November 1910, the Giants played two Sunday games against the "Johnny Kling All–Stars." Kling was a Kansas City native. Zach Wheat and Casey Stengel played for the Johnny Kling team. The first game ended in a 1–1 tie with Bob Harmon striking out 25 Giants in the game. The teams played again the next week, with the All–Stars winning 6–1 as Harmon struck out 14.

In 1910, the Kansas City Giants released three players who attempted to play for the rival Kansas City Royal Giants in a morning game and then travel across the city to play for their own club. The players were said to have played the morning Royal Giants game and then arrived late for the second game and were released by the Giants.

In their final season of play, Topeka Jack Johnson, returned to manage the 1911 Kansas City Giants. The Giants had a documented record of 18–7. It was reported the Giants did not lose a game until April 26, 1911 and defeated a team from Keio University from Japan in late May. With a winning streak of over 30 games, the Giants compiled a 46–9 record playing against other African American baseball teams in 1911.

Beginning on August 27, 1911, the Kansas City Giants and St. Paul Colored Gophers played a four–game series. Kansas City won the first three games at Riverside Park by scores of 8–2, 13–10 and 12–0. The fourth game was played at Stevens Park in Kansas City, Missouri, with the Giants winning 11–0 to sweep the series. The Giants followed with winning four of five games against the Leland Giants at Riverside Park.

In early October 1911, the Giants played a three–game series against the Kansas City Blues of the American Association, with each team winning a game and the final game ending in a tie because of darkness.

After the 1911 season, Kansas City Giants player Dee Williams was shot to death in Kansas City. In subsequent seasons the Kansas City Giants continued play, but as a semi–pro barnstorming level team with a depleted roster.

The Kansas City Giants were paralleled in Kansas City Negro league baseball by the Kansas City Royal Giants, who played from 1910 to 1912.

In 2016, it was reported that the Society for American Baseball Research (SABR) dedicated a new grave marker for "Topeka Jack" Johnson at Mount Auburn Cemetery in Topeka, Kansas.

== The ballpark ==
The Kansas City Giants hosted home games at Riverside Park. The ballpark was located in Kansas City, Kansas and the team was noted to have averaged 1,700 fans for Sunday home games, with other crowds of up to 5,000. The ballpark was said to have had an enclosed grandstand. Riverside park was located at 2nd Ave and Franklin Avenue, near the Missouri River, Kansas City, Kansas.

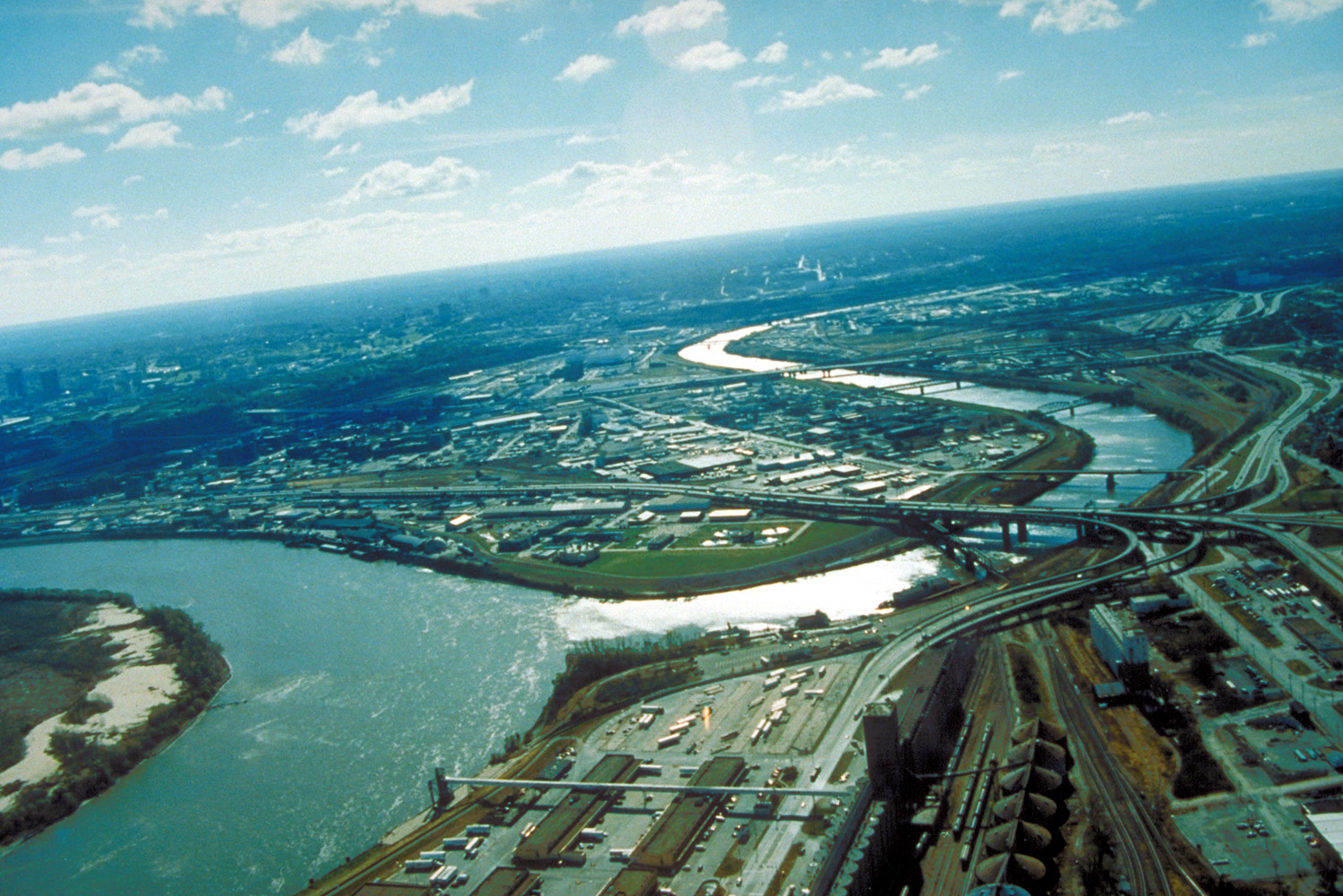
(1999) Aerial view. Kansas City, Kansas

== Timeline ==
Year(s)	# Yrs.	Team	Level	League	Ballpark
1909–1911	3	Kansas City Giants	Negro minor leagues	Independent	Riverside Park

== Year–by–year records ==
Year	Record	Finish	Manager	Playoffs/Notes
1909	12–12	5th	"Topeka Jack" Johnson	No playoffs held
1910	18–7	2nd	Jim Norman	No playoffs held
1911	6–7	4th	"Topeka Jack" Johnson	No playoffs held

== Notable alumni ==
- Bingo DeMoss (1909–1911)
- Roy Dorsey (1911)
- Bob Gilkerson (1909)
- Arthur Hardy (1911)
- Chick Harper (1911)
- Fred Hicks (1909)
- Ashes Jackson (1909–1911)
- "Topeka Jack" Johnson (1909, 1911, MGR)
- Bill Lindsay (1909–1911)
- Frog Lindsay (1909–1910)
- Jim Norman (1909), (1910, MGR)
- Tullie McAdoo (1909)
- Hurley McNair (1911)
- Eugene Milliner (1911)
- Bill Pettus (1909)
- Ginney Robinson (1909–1910)
- William Sloan (1909)
- Andrew Skinner (1909, 1911)
- Tom Stirman (1909)
- Walter Taylor (1909)
- William Tenny (1909–1911)
- Rabbit Wilkins (1909–1910)
- Dee Williams (1911)

== See also ==
- Kansas City Giants players
- Sports in Kansas City
- Negro Leagues Baseball Museum
- List of minor Negro league baseball teams
