= 1960 Baseball Hall of Fame balloting =

Elections to the Baseball Hall of Fame

National Baseball

Hall of Fame and Museum
- New inductees: 0
- Total inductees: 84

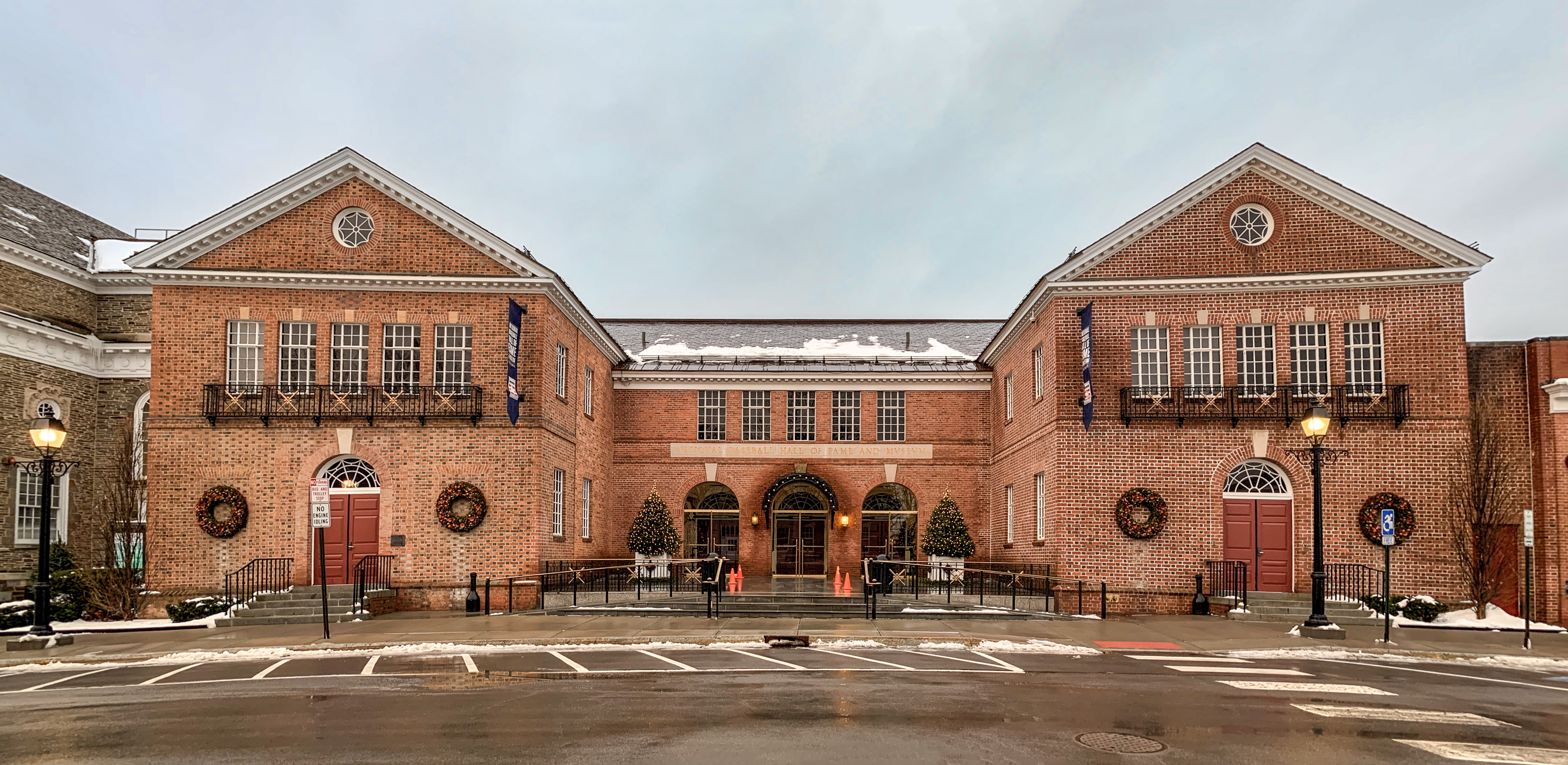
The Hall of Fame in Cooperstown, New York, in 2020

Elections to Baseball Hall of Fame for 1960 followed a system established after the 1956 election. The Veterans Committee was meeting only in odd-numbered years (until 1962). The Baseball Writers' Association of America (BBWAA) voted by mail to select from recent major league players, and as had been the case in 1958, elected no one. For the third time, the induction ceremonies in Cooperstown, New York, were canceled because there was no one to induct. This would be the last time until 2021 that no one was selected for induction to the Hall.

== BBWAA election ==
The BBWAA was authorized to elect players active in 1930 or later, but not after 1954. All 10-year members of the BBWAA were eligible to vote.

Voters were instructed to cast votes for up to 10 candidates; any candidate receiving votes on at least 75% of the ballots would be honored with induction to the Hall. A total of 134 players received votes; 269 ballots were cast, with 202 votes required for election. A total of 2,288 individual votes were cast, an average of 8.51 per ballot.

Candidates who were eligible for the first time are indicated here with a dagger (†). Candidates who have since been elected in subsequent elections are indicated in italics.

Player	Votes	Percent	Change
Edd Roush	146	54.3	▲12.2%
Sam Rice	143	53.2	▲19.4%
Eppa Rixey	142	52.8	▲40.8%
Burleigh Grimes	92	34.2	▲7.5%
Jim Bottomley	89	33.1	▲11.7%
Red Ruffing	86	32.0	▼5.2%
Red Faber	83	30.9	▲5.3%
Luke Appling	72	26.8	▼2.1%
Kiki Cuyler	72	26.8	▼7.0%
Hack Wilson	72	26.8	▼8.5%
Tony Lazzeri	59	21.9	▼8.2%
Lefty Gomez	51	19.0	▼9.6%
Johnny Mize†	45	16.7	-
Lefty O'Doul	45	16.7	▲6.5%
Earle Combs	43	16.0	▲3.2%
Hank Gowdy	38	14.1	▼2.5%
Joe Medwick	38	14.1	▼4.4%
Chuck Klein	37	13.8	▲0.3%
Marty Marion†	37	13.8	-
Lou Boudreau	35	13.0	▼11.1%
Bucky Harris	31	11.5	▼5.4%
Johnny Vander Meer	31	11.5	▼1.7%
Dave Bancroft	30	11.2	▼5.0%
Goose Goslin	30	11.2	▼1.4%
Chick Hafey	29	10.8	▲6.3%
Waite Hoyt	29	10.8	▼3.1%
Pepper Martin	29	10.8	▼6.5%
Jimmy Dykes	27	10.0	▲0.2%
Allie Reynolds†	24	8.9	-
Joe Sewell	23	8.6	▲8.2%
Lloyd Waner	22	8.2	▼6.5%
Jesse Haines	20	7.4	▼0.9%
Heinie Manush	20	7.4	▼0.9%
Bucky Walters	19	7.1	▼5.3%
Nick Altrock	18	6.7	▼0.8%
Glenn Wright	18	6.7	▼3.7%
Bobby Doerr	15	5.6	▼3.8%
Joe Judge	15	5.6	▲2.2%
Freddie Fitzsimmons	13	4.8	▼1.2%
Charlie Grimm	13	4.8	▼5.0%
Howard Ehmke	12	4.5	▼1.9%
Mel Harder	12	4.5	▲2.2%
Eddie Rommel	12	4.5	▲1.9%
Earl Averill	11	4.1	▼1.2%
Joe Gordon	11	4.1	Steady
Travis Jackson	11	4.1	Steady
Wally Schang	11	4.1	▲1.1%
Hal Schumacher	11	4.1	▲3.7%
Cy Williams	11	4.1	▲1.8%
Leo Durocher	10	3.7	▼6.8%
Tommy Henrich	10	3.7	▼0.4%
Bob Meusel	10	3.7	▲1.8%
Red Rolfe	10	3.7	▼1.2%
Arky Vaughan	10	3.7	▲1.4%
Muddy Ruel	9	3.3	▼0.5%
Frankie Crosetti	8	3.0	▲1.1%
Paul Derringer	8	3.0	▼2.6%
Joe Dugan	8	3.0	▲1.1%
Wes Ferrell	8	3.0	▼0.4%
Pete Reiser	8	3.0	▲0.7%
Harry Brecheen†	7	2.6	-
Orval Grove	7	2.6	▲0.7%
Babe Herman	7	2.6	▼2.3%
Charlie Keller	7	2.6	▼0.8%
Terry Moore	7	2.6	▼1.9%
Lefty Grove	6	2.2	-
Stan Hack	6	2.2	▼0.1%
Freddie Lindstrom	6	2.2	▲0.3%
Ernie Lombardi	6	2.2	▲0.7%
Bing Miller	6	2.2	▲1.8%
Bobo Newsom†	6	2.2	-
Jimmie Wilson	6	2.2	▲1.1%
Moe Berg	5	1.9	▲0.4%
Max Bishop	5	1.9	▲0.4%
George Kelly	5	1.9	▲1.1%
Tommy Bridges	4	1.5	▼2.6%
Dom DiMaggio†	4	1.5	-
Dolf Luque	4	1.5	▼4.1%
Riggs Stephenson	4	1.5	▲1.1%
George Uhle	4	1.5	Steady
Lon Warneke	4	1.5	▲0.7%
Hal White	4	1.5	-
Ossie Bluege	3	1.1	▲0.3%
Dolph Camilli	3	1.1	▼0.4%
Lew Fonseca	3	1.1	Steady
Pinky Higgins	3	1.1	▼1.2%
Ralph Kiner	3	1.1	▼12.4%
Red Kress	3	1.1	▲0.7%
Bob O'Farrell	3	1.1	Steady
Schoolboy Rowe	3	1.1	▼3.4%
Luke Sewell	3	1.1	Steady
Eddie Stanky†	3	1.1	-
Earl Whitehill	3	1.1	▲0.3%
Hank Edwards†	2	0.7	-
Bob Elliott†	2	0.7	-
Mike González	2	0.7	▼0.4%
Bill Hallahan	2	0.7	▲0.3%
Tommy Holmes	2	0.7	▼0.1%
Cookie Lavagetto	2	0.7	▼0.8%
Dutch Leonard†	2	0.7	-
Firpo Marberry	2	0.7	▼1.2%
Marty McManus	2	0.7	▼0.1%
Van Mungo	2	0.7	▼0.1%
Jack Quinn	2	0.7	▼2.7%
Charlie Root	2	0.7	▼1.6%
Bill Sherdel	2	0.7	▼0.1%
Sparky Adams	1	0.4	Steady
Dick Bartell	1	0.4	Steady
Ray Blades	1	0.4	Steady
George Case	1	0.4	Steady
Mort Cooper	1	0.4	▼0.7%
Doc Cramer	1	0.4	▼0.4%
Alvin Crowder	1	0.4	▼ %
Harry Danning	1	0.4	▼ %
Rick Ferrell	1	0.4	▼ %
Heinie Groh	1	0.4	-
Mule Haas	1	0.4	Steady
Bubbles Hargrave	1	0.4	Steady
Addie Joss	1	0.4	-
Willie Kamm	1	0.4	▼0.7%
Ken Keltner	1	0.4	Steady
Freddy Leach	1	0.4	▼0.4%
Hans Lobert	1	0.4	-
Wally Moses	1	0.4	Steady
Bill Nicholson†	1	0.4	-
Charley O'Leary	1	0.4	Steady
Johnny Pesky†	1	0.4	-
Preacher Roe†	1	0.4	-
Sibby Sisti†	1	0.4	-
Gus Suhr	1	0.4	Steady
Birdie Tebbetts	1	0.4	▼2.6%
Rube Walberg	1	0.4	Steady
Tom Zachary	1	0.4	Steady

Key to colors
Players who were elected in future elections. These individuals are also indicated in plain italics.

Copies of the 1958 and 1960 ballots are not available, reportedly listing "about 400" and 237 players, respectively. Eight candidates may have received votes for the first time who were previously eligible: Miller, White, Kress, Crowder, Danning, Keltner, Walberg, and Zachary (in table order). The votes for Ralph Kiner may have been write-ins; he played until 1955 and should have been ineligible. Lefty Grove received six votes despite the fact that he had already been elected to the Hall of Fame, in 1947.

The next ballot for 1962 did not include a list of names. Twenty-six candidates who received at least one vote in 1960 may have been eligible for the final time: Edd Roush, Hank Gowdy, Bucky Harris, Dave Bancroft, Joe Sewell, Nick Altrock, Joe Judge, Howard Ehmke, Eddie Rommel, Wally Schang, Cy Williams, Bob Meusel, Joe Dugan, Babe Herman, Lew Fonseca, Mike González, Marty McManus, Jack Quinn, Bill Sherdel, Sparky Adams, Ray Blades, Heinie Groh, Bubbles Hargrave, Addie Joss, Freddy Leach and Hans Lobert.
