= 1958 Baseball Hall of Fame balloting =

Elections to the Baseball Hall of Fame

National Baseball

Hall of Fame and Museum
- New inductees: 0
- Total inductees: 83

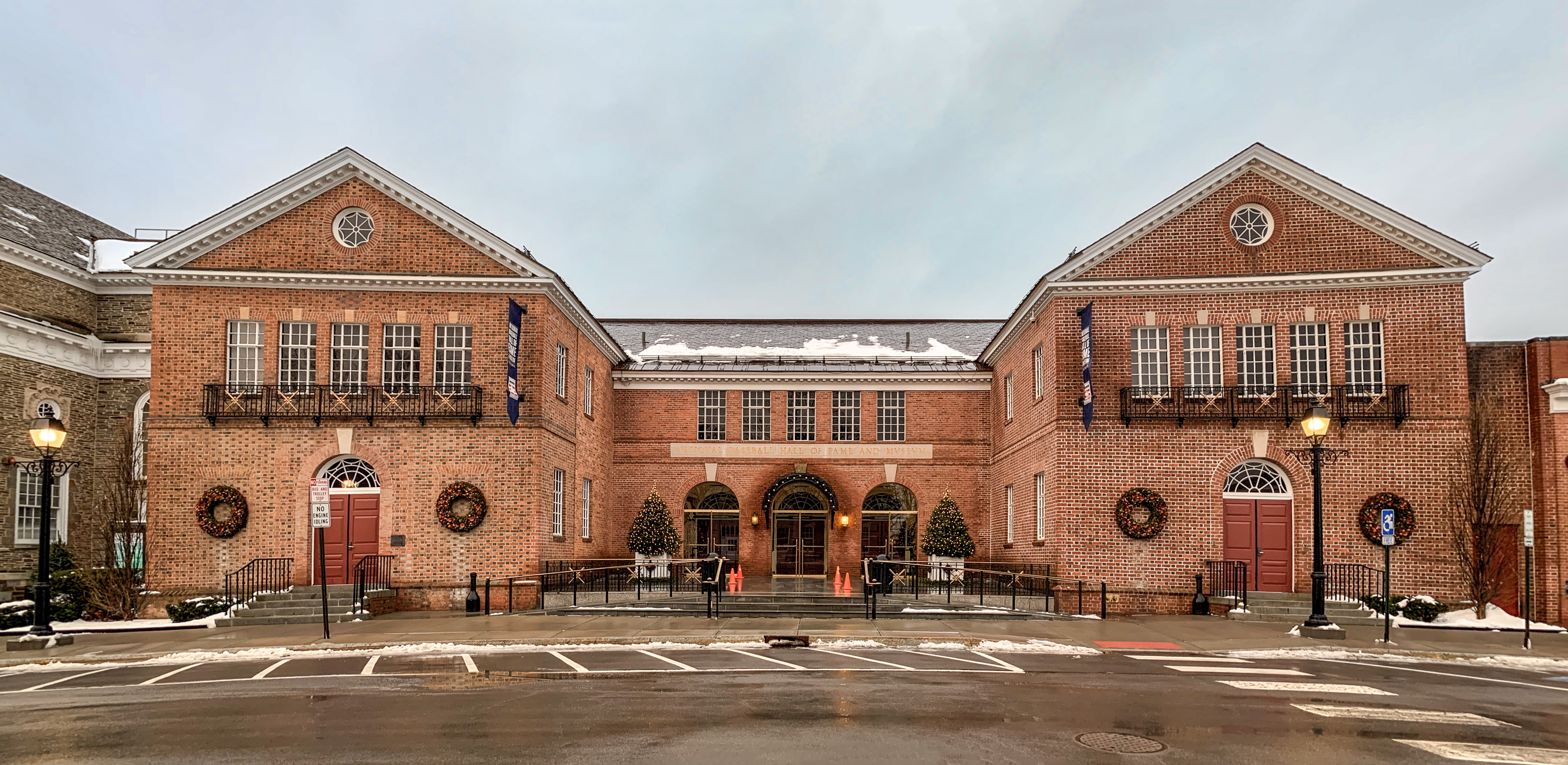
The Hall of Fame in Cooperstown, New York, in 2020

Elections to the Baseball Hall of Fame for 1958 followed a system established after the 1956 election. The Baseball Writers' Association of America (BBWAA) voted by mail to select from recent major league players; they elected no one. The BBWAA was voting only in even-number years, with the Veterans Committee meeting only in odd-numbered years to consider older major league players as well as managers, umpires, and executives. For the first time since 1950, the induction ceremonies in Cooperstown, New York, were canceled because there was no one to induct, the second such occurrence in Hall of Fame history.

== BBWAA election ==
Several elements of the current procedure were put into effect. There was a printed list of eligible candidates, all of whom had played in at least ten major league seasons. Only 10-year members of the BBWAA were eligible to vote, and they were instructed to vote for up to ten candidates rather than ten. The latter revision resulted from complaints by many writers in 1956 that there were no longer many viable candidates, a situation which had been caused partly by changes governing candidate eligibility.

The BBWAA was authorized to elect players active in 1928 or later but not after 1952, a 25-year span of major league finales. (In a change, they were permitted to be active in non-playing roles.) The Hall of Fame would induct any candidate who received at least 75% support, as always, which was 200 votes on 266 ballots returned. A total of 2,400 individual votes were cast, an average of 9.02 per ballot.

There were about 400 players on the new ballot and about 154 received at least one vote. A dagger (†) marks candidates who last played in 1951 or 1952. Under the new rules they would have been on the ballot for the first time, alone among the candidates who received votes, but this was the first ballot with a list of players. Candidates who have been inducted subsequently are named in italics.

With many strong candidates but none who particularly stood out, many players received support but none were elected; while 27 players received between 10% and 40%, only two received more than 40%. Max Carey's 51.1% remains the lowest percentage for a top vote getter in a BBWAA election.

Player	Votes	Percent	Change
Max Carey	136	51.1	▲17.4%
Edd Roush	112	42.1	▼5.1%
Red Ruffing	99	37.2	▼13.1%
Hack Wilson	94	35.3	▼3.0%
Kiki Cuyler	90	33.8	▲5.3%
Sam Rice	90	33.8	▲10.5%
Tony Lazzeri	80	30.1	▼3.1%
Luke Appling	77	28.9	▲21.6%
Lefty Gomez	76	28.6	▼17.5%
Burleigh Grimes	71	26.7	▲13.7%
Red Faber	68	25.6	▲8.0%
Lou Boudreau†	64	24.1	-
Jim Bottomley	57	21.4	▼0.4%
Joe Medwick	50	18.8	▲2.7%
Pepper Martin	46	17.3	▲13.7%
Hank Gowdy	45	16.9	▼8.5%
Bucky Harris	45	16.9	-
Dave Bancroft	43	16.2	▲8.4%
Lloyd Waner	39	14.7	▲5.4%
Waite Hoyt	37	13.9	▼5.3%
Chuck Klein	36	13.5	▼9.3%
Johnny Vander Meer† (Note: While Vander Meer was eligible for the first time in this election, he had received votes in 1945 (while inactive due to military service) and 1956.)	35	13.2	▲11.6%
Earle Combs	34	12.8	▲5.5%
Stan Coveleski	34	12.8	-
Al López	34	12.8	▲12.3%
Bucky Walters	33	12.4	▲9.8%
Eppa Rixey	32	12.0	▼2.0%
Leo Durocher	28	10.5	▲10.0%
Lefty O'Doul	27	10.2	▲7.6%
Jimmy Dykes	26	9.8	▲9.3%
Goose Goslin	26	9.8	▼3.7%
Charlie Grimm	26	9.8	-
Bobby Doerr†	25	9.4	-
Jesse Haines	22	8.3	▲1.0%
Heinie Manush	22	8.3	▲1.6%
Nick Altrock	20	7.5	▲7.0%
Billy Southworth	18	6.8	-
Freddie Fitzsimmons	16	6.0	▲4.4%
Paul Derringer	15	5.6	▼0.6%
Dolf Luque	15	5.6	▲5.1%
Earl Averill	14	5.3	▲3.7%
Babe Herman	13	4.9	▼0.8%
Art Nehf	13	4.9	-
Red Rolfe	13	4.9	▲3.3%
Chick Hafey	12	4.5	▼3.8%
Terry Moore	12	4.5	-
Schoolboy Rowe	12	4.5	-
Tommy Bridges	11	4.1	▲2.5%
Joe Gordon	11	4.1	▲2.0%
Tommy Henrich	11	4.1	▲3.1%
Travis Jackson	11	4.1	▼3.2%
Steve O'Neill	10	3.8	-
Muddy Ruel	10	3.8	▼4.5%
Rick Ferrell	9	3.4	▲2.9%
Joe Judge	9	3.4	▲2.4%
Charlie Keller†	9	3.4	-
Jack Quinn	9	3.4	▲2.9%
Wally Schang	8	3.0	▲2.5%
Birdie Tebbetts†	8	3.0	-
Glenn Wright	8	3.0	▲1.4%
Howard Ehmke	7	2.6	▼1.5%
Billy Herman	7	2.6	▲1.6%
Eddie Rommel	7	2.6	-
Stan Hack	6	2.3	▲1.8%
Mel Harder	6	2.3	-
Pinky Higgins	6	2.3	-
Carl Mays	6	2.3	-
Pete Reiser†	6	2.3	-
Charlie Root	6	2.3	-
Arky Vaughan	6	2.3	▼2.4%
Cy Williams	6	2.3	▼3.4%
Bullet Joe Bush†	5	1.9	-
Frankie Crosetti	5	1.9	▲1.4%
Joe Dugan	5	1.9	▲1.4%
Orval Grove	5	1.9	-
Fielder Jones	5	1.9	-
Freddie Lindstrom	5	1.9	▲0.3%
Firpo Marberry	5	1.9	-
Bob Meusel	5	1.9	▲1.4%
Moe Berg	4	1.5	-
Max Bishop	4	1.5	▲1.0%
Dolph Camilli	4	1.5	▲1.0%
Cookie Lavagetto	4	1.5	-
Ernie Lombardi	4	1.5	▼2.6%
Urban Shocker	4	1.5	-
George Uhle	4	1.5	▲1.0%
Charlie Berry	3	1.1	-
Mort Cooper	3	1.1	▲0.1%
Tony Cuccinello	3	1.1	▲0.6%
Bill Doak	3	1.1	-
Lew Fonseca	3	1.1	▲0.1%
Mike González	3	1.1	-
Frankie Gustine	3	1.1	-
Willie Kamm	3	1.1	-
Bob O'Farrell	3	1.1	-
Luke Sewell	3	1.1	-
Billy Werber	3	1.1	-
Jimmie Wilson	3	1.1	▼7.7%
Wally Berger	2	0.8	▲0.3%
Ossie Bluege	2	0.8	▼0.2%
Doc Cramer	2	0.8	▼1.3%
Tommy Holmes†	2	0.8	-
George Kelly	2	0.8	▼0.2%
Ray Kremer	2	0.8	-
Freddy Leach	2	0.8	-
Joe McCarthy (Note: McCarthy received two votes, despite having been inducted to the Hall of Fame the previous summer; also, he was ineligible to be elected as a player, having never appeared in a major league game.)	2	0.8	-
Marty McManus	2	0.8	-
Lee Meadows	2	0.8	-
Van Mungo	2	0.8	-
Cy Perkins	2	0.8	-
Bill Sherdel	2	0.8	▲0.3%
Lon Warneke	2	0.8	-
Earl Whitehill	2	0.8	▲0.3%
Sparky Adams	1	0.4	-
Jimmy Austin	1	0.4	-
Dick Bartell	1	0.4	-
Larry Benton	1	0.4	-
Ray Blades	1	0.4	-
George Case	1	0.4	-
Sam Chapman†	1	0.4	-
Alvin Crowder	1	0.4	-
Harry Danning	1	0.4	-
Curt Davis	1	0.4	-
Jumbo Elliott	1	0.4	-
Rick Ferrell	1	0.4	▼0.1%
George Grantham	1	0.4	-
Mule Haas	1	0.4	▼0.1%
Bill Hallahan	1	0.4	▼0.1%
Bubbles Hargrave	1	0.4	-
Billy Jurges	1	0.4	-
Ken Keltner	1	0.4	-
Red Kress	1	0.4	-
Red Lucas	1	0.4	-
Gus Mancuso	1	0.4	-
Bing Miller	1	0.4	-
Wally Moses†	1	0.4	-
Johnny Mostil	1	0.4	▼0.1%
Charley O'Leary	1	0.4	-
Monte Pearson	1	0.4	-
Wally Pipp	1	0.4	-
Hal Schumacher	1	0.4	▼0.6%
Jack Scott	1	0.4	-
Joe Sewell	1	0.4	▼1.2%
Rip Sewell	1	0.4	-
Warren Spahn (Note: Spahn received a vote despite still being an active player.)	1	0.4	-
Riggs Stephenson	1	0.4	▼0.6%
Gus Suhr	1	0.4	▼0.1%
Clyde Sukeforth	1	0.4	-
Rube Walberg	1	0.4	-
Harry Walker†	1	0.4	-
Ken Williams	1	0.4	▼0.1%
Whit Wyatt	1	0.4	-
Pep Young	1	0.4	-
Tom Zachary	1	0.4	-

Players who were elected in future elections. These individuals are also indicated in plain italics.
