= 1950 Baseball Hall of Fame balloting =

Elections to the Baseball Hall of Fame

National Baseball

Hall of Fame and Museum
- New inductees: 0
- Total inductees: 58

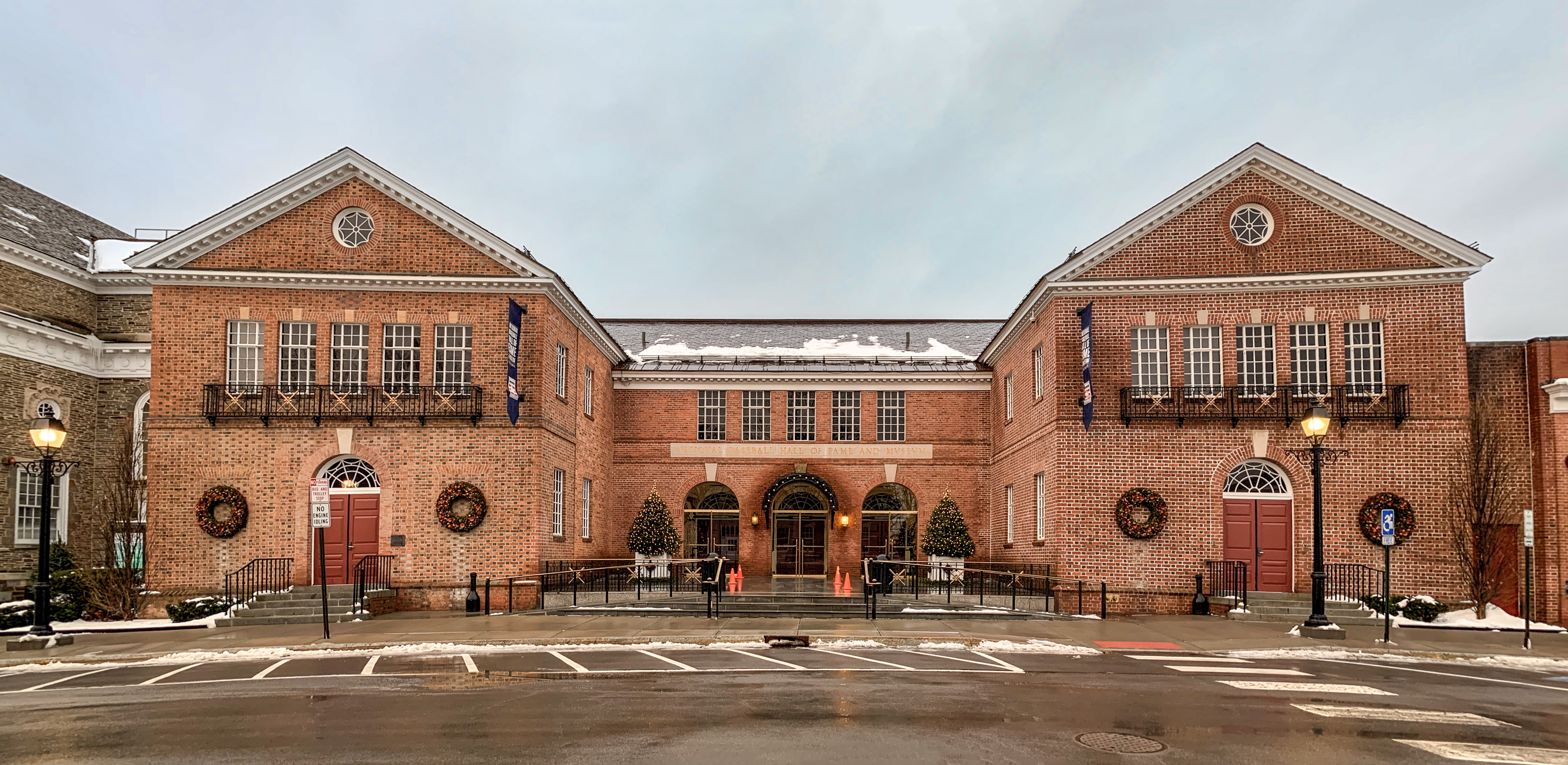
The Hall of Fame in Cooperstown, New York, in 2020

Elections to the Baseball Hall of Fame for 1950 were subject to one rules change, the elimination of a runoff election by the baseball writers in case of no winner, which had been used the year prior. The Baseball Writers' Association of America (BBWAA) voted once by mail to select from major league players retired less than 25 years, and elected no one. Meanwhile, the Old-Timers Committee, with jurisdiction over earlier players and other figures, did not meet. For the first time, except years without any election activity, there were no new Hall of Fame members.

== BBWAA election ==
The 10-year members of the BBWAA had the authority to select any players active in 1925 or later, provided they had not been active in 1949. The year before, a 25-year moving boundary regarding player activity had been established which would remain in the years to come. Voters were instructed to cast votes for 10 candidates; any candidate receiving votes on at least 75% of the ballots would be honored with induction to the Hall.

A new rule had been added for the 1950 ballot. Writers could not vote for anyone currently wearing a baseball uniform, which included some qualified players who were now coaches on teams. This rule would be dropped after a few years.

A total of 168 ballots were cast, with 1,481 individual votes for 100 specific candidates, an average of 8.82 per ballot; 126 votes were required for election. Once again, no candidate received 75% of the vote and the Hall of Fame would not elect any new players in 1950. Candidates who have since been selected in subsequent elections are indicated in italics:

| Player | Votes | Percent | Change |
|---|---|---|---|
| Mel Ott | 115 | 68.5 | ▲7.1% |
| Bill Terry | 105 | 62.5 | ▲9.6% |
| Jimmie Foxx | 103 | 61.3 | ▲5.7% |
| Paul Waner | 95 | 56.5 | ▲8.8% |
| Al Simmons | 90 | 53.6 | ▼4.6% |
| Harry Heilmann | 87 | 51.8 | ▲13.2% |
| Dizzy Dean | 85 | 50.6 | ▼6.9% |
| Bill Dickey | 78 | 46.4 | ▲3.9% |
| Rabbit Maranville | 66 | 39.3 | ▲1.4% |
| Hank Greenberg | 64 | 38.1 | ▼5.7% |
| Gabby Hartnett | 54 | 32.1 | ▲9.2% |
| Dazzy Vance | 52 | 31.0 | ▲9.4% |
| Ted Lyons | 42 | 25.0 | ▲6.0% |
| Joe Cronin | 33 | 19.6 | ▼2.0% |
| Tony Lazzeri | 21 | 12.5 | ▼0.6% |
| Lefty Gomez | 18 | 10.7 | ▼0.4% |
| Zack Wheat | 17 | 10.1 | ▲0.3% |
| Ross Youngs | 17 | 10.1 | ▼3.0% |
| Edd Roush | 16 | 9.5 | ▼0.3% |
| Ray Schalk | 16 | 9.5 | ▼6.2% |
| Hack Wilson | 16 | 9.5 | ▼6.2% |
| Max Carey | 14 | 8.3 | ▼0.5% |
| Chuck Klein | 14 | 8.3 | ▲2.4% |
| Charlie Grimm | 13 | 7.7 | ▲1.2% |
| Red Ruffing | 12 | 7.1 | ▼7.3% |
| Kiki Cuyler | 11 | 6.5 | ▲3.9% |
| Jesse Haines | 11 | 6.5 | ▲5.2% |
| Waite Hoyt | 11 | 6.5 | ▲1.9% |
| Dave Bancroft | 9 | 5.4 | ▲2.1% |
| Red Faber | 9 | 5.4 | ▲1.5% |
| Lefty O'Doul | 9 | 5.4 | ▲2.8% |
| Cy Williams | 9 | 5.4 | ▲4.1% |
| Jim Bottomley | 8 | 4.8 | ▼0.4% |
| Stan Hack | 8 | 4.8 | ▲2.2% |
| Pepper Martin | 7 | 4.2 | ▼6.3% |
| Red Rolfe | 7 | 4.2 | - |
| Babe Adams | 6 | 3.6 | ▲0.3% |
| Chief Bender | 6 | 3.6 | ▲2.3% |
| Hank Gowdy | 6 | 3.6 | ▼2.9% |
| Burleigh Grimes | 6 | 3.6 | ▼1.6% |
| Travis Jackson | 6 | 3.6 | ▼0.3% |
| Eppa Rixey | 6 | 3.6 | ▲1.0% |
| Frank Baker | 4 | 2.4 | - |
| Chick Hafey | 4 | 2.4 | ▲1.1% |
| Bucky Harris | 4 | 2.4 | ▼4.8% |
| Bob O'Farrell | 4 | 2.4 | - |
| Muddy Ruel | 4 | 2.4 | - |
| Bucky Walters | 4 | 2.4 | - |
| Jimmie Wilson | 4 | 2.4 | ▼1.5% |
| Earle Combs | 3 | 1.8 | ▼2.1% |
| Ernie Lombardi | 3 | 1.8 | - |
| Everett Scott | 3 | 1.8 | ▼0.2% |
| Casey Stengel | 3 | 1.8 | ▼0.2% |
| George Burns | 2 | 1.2 | ▲0.5% |
| Spud Chandler | 2 | 1.2 | - |
| Jimmy Dykes | 2 | 1.2 | ▼3.4% |
| George Earnshaw | 2 | 1.2 | ▼0.1% |
| Lew Fonseca | 2 | 1.2 | - |
| Goose Goslin | 2 | 1.2 | ▼1.4% |
| Heinie Groh | 2 | 1.2 | - |
| Mel Harder | 2 | 1.2 | ▼1.4% |
| Babe Herman | 2 | 1.2 | ▼2.1% |
| Pinky Higgins | 2 | 1.2 | - |
| Harry Hooper | 2 | 1.2 | - |
| Miller Huggins | 2 | 1.2 | - |
| Bob Meusel | 2 | 1.2 | ▼0.8% |
| Art Nehf | 2 | 1.2 | ▲0.5% |
| Tommy Thevenow | 2 | 1.2 | - |
| Glenn Wright | 2 | 1.2 | ▲0.5% |
| Stan Coveleski | 2 | 1.2 | ▼0.8% |
| Frankie Crosetti | 1 | 0.6 | - |
| Paul Derringer | 1 | 0.6 | - |
| Jewel Ens | 1 | 0.6 | - |
| Freddie Fitzsimmons | 1 | 0.6 | ▼0.7% |
| Art Fletcher | 1 | 0.6 | ▼0.1% |
| Charlie Gelbert | 1 | 0.6 | ▼0.7% |
| Mike González | 1 | 0.6 | - |
| Fielder Jones | 1 | 0.6 | - |
| Red Lucas | 1 | 0.6 | ▼0.7% |
| Dolf Luque | 1 | 0.6 | - |
| Sherry Magee | 1 | 0.6 | - |
| Firpo Marberry | 1 | 0.6 | - |
| Stuffy McInnis | 1 | 0.6 | ▼4.6% |
| Bill McKechnie | 1 | 0.6 | - |
| Clyde Milan | 1 | 0.6 | - |
| Jo-Jo Moore | 1 | 0.6 | - |
| Terry Moore | 1 | 0.6 | - |
| Steve O'Neill | 1 | 0.6 | ▼3.3% |
| Hub Pruett | 1 | 0.6 | ▼0.1% |
| Sam Rice | 1 | 0.6 | ▼1.4% |
| Eddie Rommel | 1 | 0.6 | ▼0.7% |
| Charlie Root | 1 | 0.6 | ▼0.1% |
| Wally Schang | 1 | 0.6 | - |
| George Selkirk | 1 | 0.6 | ▼0.1% |
| Bill Sherdel | 1 | 0.6 | ▼0.1% |
| Billy Southworth | 1 | 0.6 | ▼4.0% |
| Bill Wambsganss | 1 | 0.6 | - |
| Lloyd Waner | 1 | 0.6 | ▼1.4% |
| Billy Werber | 1 | 0.6 | ▼0.1% |
| Smoky Joe Wood | 1 | 0.6 | - |

| Players who were elected in future elections. These individuals are also indicated in plain italics. |

== Sources ==
- James, Bill (1994). The Politics of Glory: How Baseball's Hall of Fame Really Works. Macmillan. ISBN 0025107747. "Note: reissued in paperback as Whatever Happened to the Hall of Fame?"
