= 1962 Baseball Hall of Fame balloting =

Elections to the Baseball Hall of Fame

National Baseball

Hall of Fame and Museum
- New inductees: 4
- via BBWAA: 2
- via Veterans Committee: 2
- Total inductees: 90
- Induction date: July 23, 1962

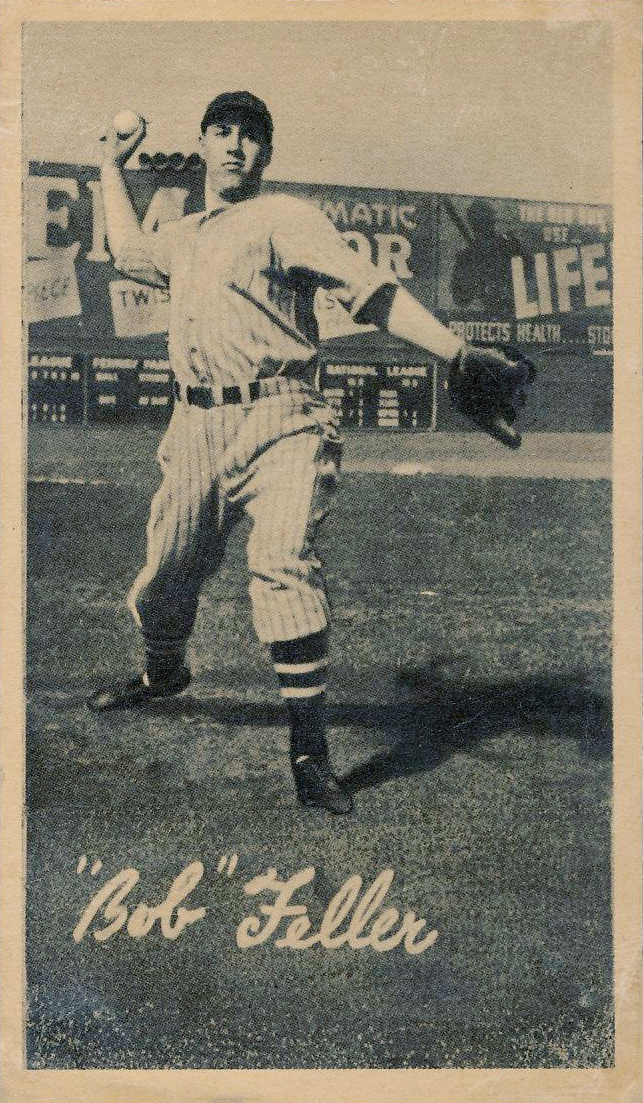
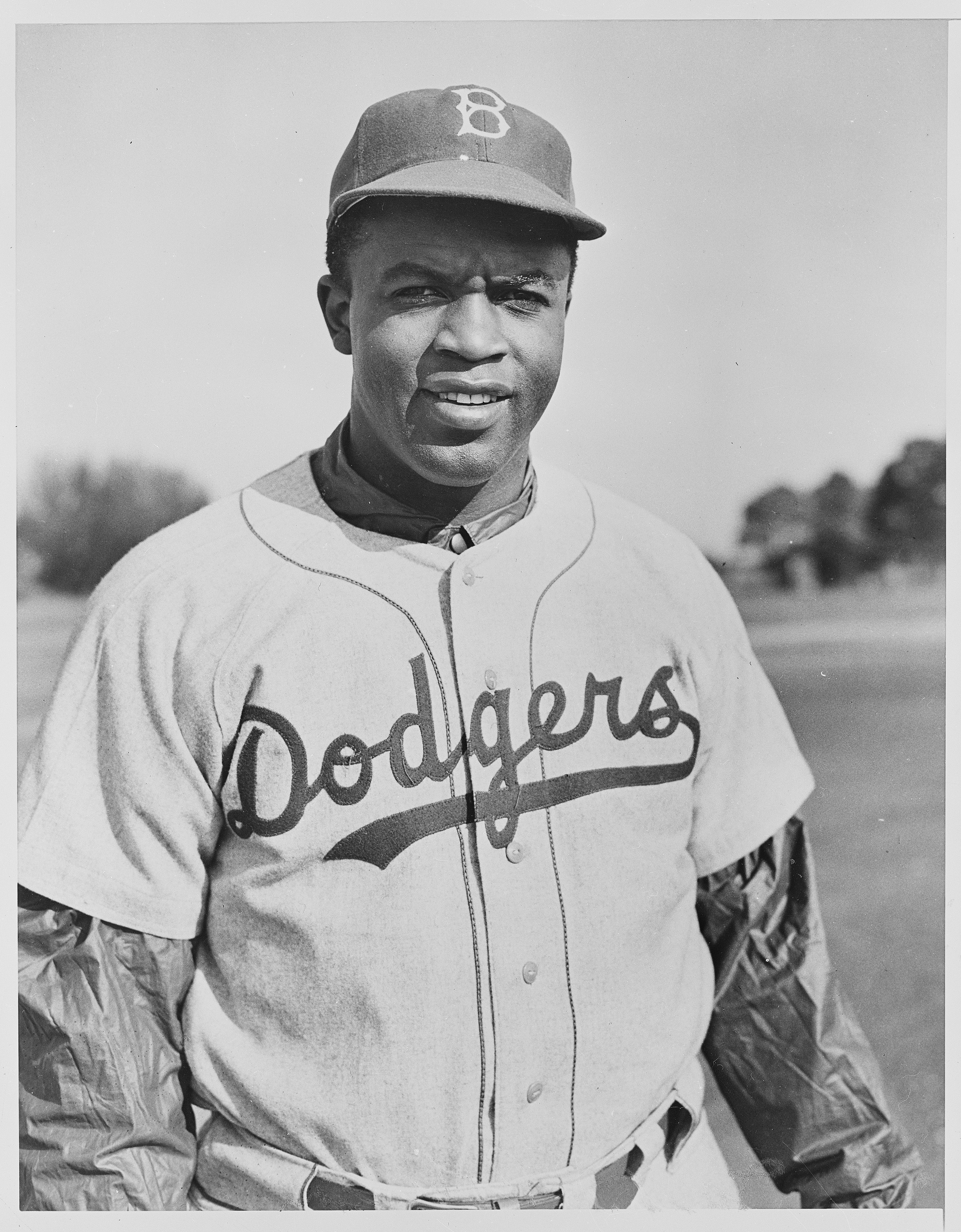
1962 BBWAA inductees Bob Feller (left) and Jackie Robinson

Elections to the Baseball Hall of Fame for 1962 followed a new system for even-number years. Since 1956 the Baseball Writers' Association of America (BBWAA) and Veterans Committee had alternated in their duties, but the BBWAA, voting by mail to select from recent major league players, had elected no one for 1958 and no one for 1960. Now there would be a second, "runoff" election in case of no winner. At the same time, the Veterans Committee resumed meeting annually to consider executives, managers, umpires, and earlier major league players.

The provision for a runoff was not necessary for this election, as the writers elected two new candidates on their first ballot, Bob Feller and Jackie Robinson. The Veterans Committee selected Bill McKechnie and Edd Roush, both of whom were still alive to be interviewed and invited to the induction ceremonies. A formal induction ceremony was held in Cooperstown, New York, on July 23, 1962, with Commissioner of Baseball Ford Frick presiding.

== BBWAA election ==
The BBWAA was authorized to elect players active in 1932 or later, but not after 1956. All 10-year members of the BBWAA were eligible to vote.

Voters were instructed to cast their votes for up to 10 candidates; any candidate receiving votes on at least 75% of the ballots would be honored with induction to the Hall. Results of the 1962 election by the BBWAA were announced on January 23. A total of 78 players received votes; 160 ballots were cast, with 120 votes required for election. A total of 1,090 individual votes were cast, an average of 6.81 per ballot—the first election to average fewer than 8 votes per ballot, and a record low which would stand until 1987 (6.61 votes per ballot).

Eligible for the final time were: Sam Rice, Eppa Rixey, Burleigh Grimes, Hack Wilson, Kiki Cuyler, Red Faber, Jim Bottomley, Lefty Gomez, Waite Hoyt, Heinie Manush, Goose Goslin, Lefty O'Doul, Tony Lazzeri, Chick Hafey, Freddie Lindstrom, Earle Combs, Jimmie Dykes, Jimmie Wilson, Earl Averill, Jesse Haines, Charlie Grimm, Firpo Marberry, Wes Ferrell, Freddie Fitzsimmons, Travis Jackson, George Kelly, Red Rolfe, Luke Sewell, Riggs Stephenson and Glenn Wright.

Many of the above candidates would lose eligibility before the 1964 election due to a rule change affecting the retirement qualifications of those voted on by the BBWAA. While the BBWAA had previously been able to consider those who had been retired between 5 and 30 seasons, after this election the BBWAA were to consider those who had been retired between 5 and 20 seasons. Among the candidates who were affected by this rule change and would not appear on the 1964 BBWAA ballot, the top two vote receivers (Sam Rice and Eppa Rixey) were elected by the Veterans Committee in 1963.

Candidates who were eligible for the first time are indicated with a dagger (†).

Player	Votes	Percent	Change
**Bob Feller**†	150	93.8	-
**Jackie Robinson**†	124	77.5	-
Sam Rice	81	50.6	▼2.6%
Red Ruffing	72	45.0	▲13.0%
Eppa Rixey	49	30.6	▼22.2%
Luke Appling	48	30.0	▲3.2%
Phil Rizzuto†	44	27.5	-
Burleigh Grimes	43	26.9	▼7.3%
Hack Wilson	39	24.4	▼2.4%
Joe Medwick	34	21.3	▼7.2%
Kiki Cuyler	31	19.4	▼7.4%
Red Faber	30	18.8	▼12.1%
Jim Bottomley	20	12.5	▼20.6%
Lefty Gomez	20	12.5	▼6.5%
Waite Hoyt	18	11.3	▲0.5%
Chuck Klein	18	11.3	▼2.5%
Marty Marion	16	10.0	▼3.8%
Heinie Manush	15	9.4	▲2.0%
Allie Reynolds	15	9.4	▼0.5%
Goose Goslin	14	8.8	▼2.4%
Johnny Mize	14	8.8	▼7.9%
Lefty O'Doul	13	8.1	▼8.6%
Lou Boudreau	12	7.5	▼5.5%
Al López	11	6.9	▼2.8%
Bobby Doerr	10	6.3	▼0.7%
Tony Lazzeri	8	5.0	▼16.9%
Chick Hafey	7	4.4	▼6.4%
Mel Harder	7	4.4	▼0.1%
Freddie Lindstrom	7	4.4	▲2.2%
Earle Combs	6	3.8	▼12.2%
Jimmy Dykes	6	3.8	▼6.2%
Pepper Martin	6	3.8	▼7.0%
Earl Whitehill	6	3.8	▲2.7%
Arky Vaughan	6	3.8	▲0.1%
Ralph Kiner	5	3.1	▲2.0%
Ernie Lombardi	5	3.1	▼0.9%
Johnny Vander Meer	5	3.1	▼8.4%
Bucky Walters	5	3.1	▼4.0%
Lloyd Waner	5	3.1	▼5.1%
Joe Gordon	4	2.5	▼1.6%
Billy Herman	4	2.5	▼0.1%
Hal Newhouser†	4	2.5	-
Jimmie Wilson	4	2.5	▲0.3%
Earl Averill	3	1.9	▼2.2%
Jesse Haines	3	1.9	▼5.5%
Tommy Henrich	3	1.9	▼1.8%
Bobo Newsom	3	1.9	▼0.3%
Phil Cavarretta†	2	1.3	-
Spud Chandler	2	1.3	-
Dom DiMaggio	2	1.3	▼0.2%
Charlie Grimm	2	1.3	▼3.5%
Firpo Marberry	2	1.3	▲0.6%
Lon Warneke	2	1.3	▼0.2%
Tommy Bridges	1	0.6	▼0.9%
George Case	1	0.6	▲0.2%
Billy Cox†	1	0.6	-
Doc Cramer	1	0.6	▲0.2%
Leo Durocher	1	0.6	▼3.1%
Bob Elliott	1	0.6	▼0.1%
Wes Ferrell	1	0.6	▼2.4%
Freddie Fitzsimmons	1	0.6	▼4.2%
Fred Hutchinson†	1	0.6	-
Travis Jackson	1	0.6	▼3.5%
Charlie Keller	1	0.6	▼2.0%
George Kelly	1	0.6	▼1.3%
Frank McCormick	1	0.6	-
Terry Moore	1	0.6	▼2.0%
Vic Raschi†	1	0.6	-
Preacher Roe	1	0.6	▲0.2%
Red Rolfe	1	0.6	▼3.1%
Johnny Sain†	1	0.6	-
Hal Schumacher	1	0.6	▼3.5%
Luke Sewell	1	0.6	▼0.5%
Rip Sewell†	1	0.6	-
Riggs Stephenson	1	0.6	▼0.9%
Dixie Walker†	1	0.6	-
Glenn Wright	1	0.6	▼6.1%
Rudy York	1	0.6	-

Key to colors
Elected to the Hall. These individuals are also indicated in **bold italics**.
Players who were elected in future elections. These individuals are also indicated in plain italics.
