= Harry Danning =

American baseball player (1911–2004)

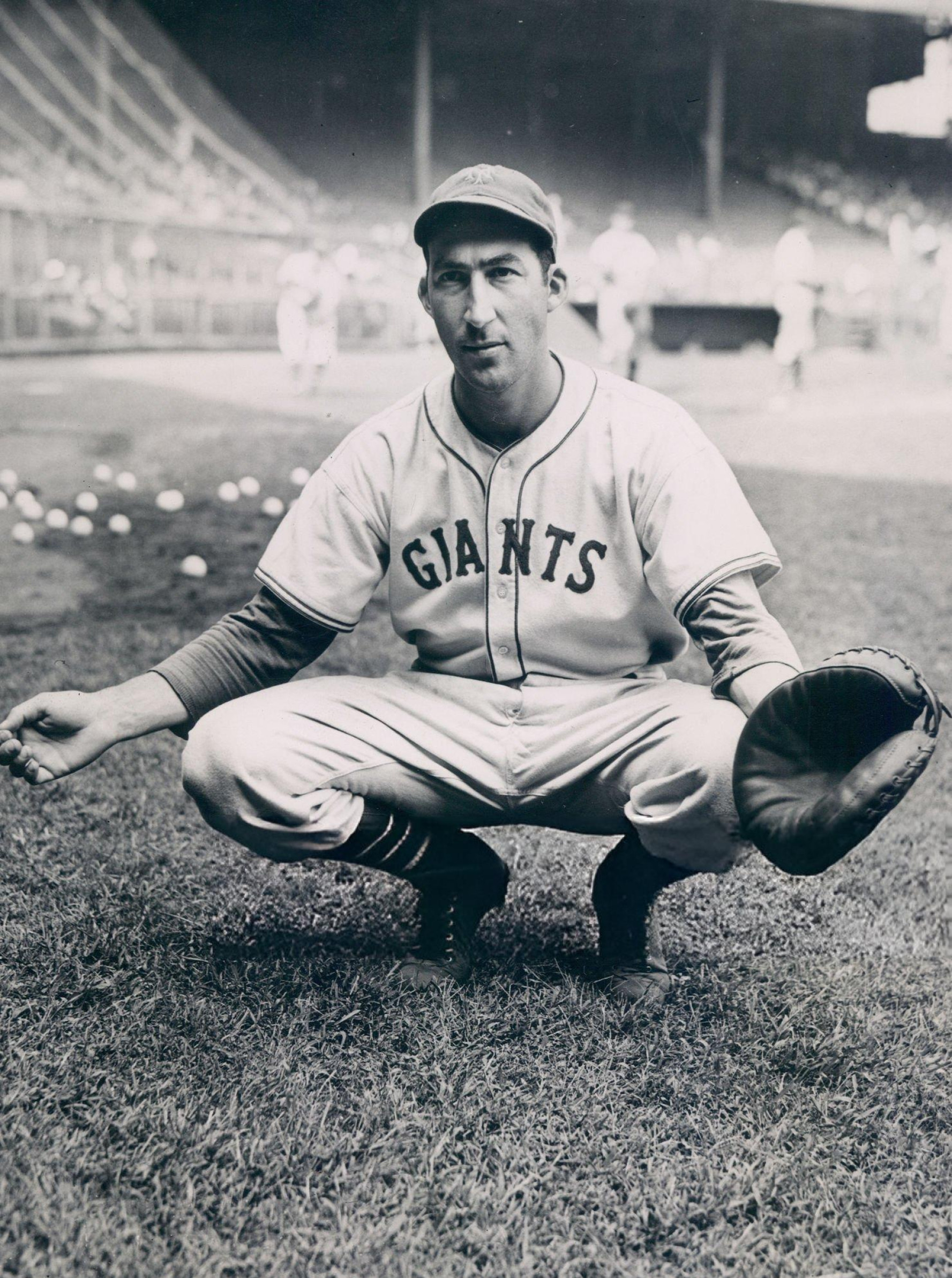
- Danning in 1937
- Catcher
- Born: September 6, 1911; Los Angeles, California, U.S.
- Died: November 29, 2004 (aged 93); Valparaiso, Indiana, U.S.
- Batted: Right Threw: Right

MLB debut
- July 30, 1933, for the New York Giants

Last MLB appearance
- September 25, 1942, for the New York Giants

MLB statistics
- Batting average: .285
- Home runs: 57
- Runs batted in: 397
- Stats at Baseball Reference

Teams
- New York Giants (1933–1942)

Career highlights and awards
- 4× All-Star (1938–1941)

Harry Danning (September 6, 1911 – November 29, 2004), nicknamed "Harry the Horse", was an American professional baseball player. He played his entire Major League Baseball career as a catcher for the New York Giants, and was considered to be both an excellent hitter and one of the top defensive catchers of his era. He batted and threw right-handed, and was a member of the National League All-Star team for four consecutive years, 1938–41.

== Early and personal life ==
Danning was born in Los Angeles to Jewish parents: his father, Robert Danning, was a Polish immigrant and owned a used-furniture store; his mother, Jennie Danning (née Goldberg), was a Latvian immigrant. Danning was one of six children, including three sons; Robert Danning took his sons to see baseball games, including the Pacific Coast League and the Negro league games. Robert's love of baseball inspired both Harry and his older brother Ike Danning, who played for the St. Louis Browns in 1928.

Danning attended Los Angeles High School in Los Angeles. His father became ill and Harry started working at 13, including delivering ice. Danning also worked for a rug salesman after high school. By that time, Danning's father had died, and the rug store job paid well – $90 a month – helping Danning support his family. He supplemented his income playing semipro baseball on Sundays, for $7.50 a week.

== Baseball career ==
In 1931, Danning signed a $150-a-month contract with the Class-A team in Bridgeport, Connecticut, owned by the Giants. When the Bridgeport franchise folded, mid-season 1932, Danning moved to Winston-Salem, North Carolina based Winston-Salem Twins to be part of the Piedmont League. Danning's batting average in the minor leagues was above .300 every season.

Danning first played with the New York Giants in 1933. From 1934 to 1936, he served as the Giants reserve catcher, working behind Gus Mancuso. In 1934 in spring training, despite a team reservation Jewish ballplayers Phil Weintraub and Danning were refused entry to the Flamingo Hotel in Miami Beach, Florida, which had a "No Jews" policy. However, they were allowed to stay when Giants manager Bill Terry threatened he would take the whole team to another hotel if his Jewish ballplayers were not allowed in.

In the 1937 season, Danning and Mancuso shared the catching duties with Danning appearing in 93 games, while Mancuso appeared in 86 games. In 1938 Danning took over the role as the Giants starting catcher. He was selected for the National League All-Star squad in four consecutive years (1938–1941), was on the world champion Giants team that defeated the Washington Senators in the 1933 World Series, and appeared in the pennant-winning clubs that were defeated by the New York Yankees in the 1936 and 1937 World Series.

In the 1937 series, CBS announcer Ted Husing nicknamed Danning "Harry The Horse" for Damon Runyon's Broadway character.

From 1938 through 1940 Danning hit .306, .313 and .300, and finished in the top 10 in National League MVP voting in 1939 (9th) and 1940 (7th). He collected career highs in home runs (16) in 1939, and in RBIs (91) in 1940. He led all National League catchers with a .991 fielding average in 1939.

On June 9, 1939, against the pennant-winning Cincinnati Reds at the Polo Grounds, Danning was one of five Giants to hit a home run in the fourth inning, breaking the prior record of four home runs by a team in one inning. Remarkably, all five were hit by the Giants with two outs. Then, on June 15, 1940, he hit for the cycle in a game against Pittsburgh. His home run came on an inside-the-park home run that landed 460 feet (140 m) on the fly in front of the Giants' clubhouse, wedged behind the Eddie Grant memorial.

Through 2010, he was ninth all-time in career hits (behind Al Rosen) among Jewish major league baseball players.

== Career statistics ==
In addition to batting .300 or higher in three consecutive seasons, Danning had a .285 career batting average, tying Yogi Berra for the 18th highest lifetime batting average among Hall of Fame eligible major league baseball catchers. He hit 57 lifetime home runs and 397 RBIs in 890 games. He had a career fielding percentage of .985, leading National League catchers three times in putouts, and twice in assists and baserunners caught stealing. During his career, he threw out 47% of runners attempting to steal. He caught the screwballer Carl Hubbell, and was also a teammate of Mel Ott, Bill Terry and Travis Jackson, four Hall of Famers.

== After baseball ==
During World War II, Danning served in the United States Army, and announced his retirement from baseball after his military service. He went into the automobile business in Los Angeles, and also worked as a minor league coach.

He received one vote each for the Hall of Fame in both 1958 and 1960. In 1996 he was inducted into the Southern California Jewish Sports Hall of Fame.

He died in Valparaiso, Indiana, at the age of 93. His obituary and photograph appeared in the December 13, 2004, edition of Sports Illustrated magazine.

== Other highlights ==
- The BBWAA in TSN poll for the 1940 All-Star team for both major leagues comprised Frank McCormick, 1b; Joe Gordon, 2b; Luke Appling, ss; Stan Hack, 3b; Harry Danning, c; and Bob Feller, Bucky Walters and Paul Derringer, p (January 8, 1941).
- In 1940 Danning was depicted on a Wheaties box as "the year's best catcher". Bucky Walters and Barney McCoskey were also depicted on that box.

== See also ==
- List of Jewish Major League Baseball players
- List of Major League Baseball players to hit for the cycle
- List of Major League Baseball players who spent their entire career with one franchise

Achievements
Preceded by Harry Craft	Hitting for the cycle June 15, 1940	Succeeded by Johnny Mize
