= Rube Walberg =

American baseball player (1896–1978)

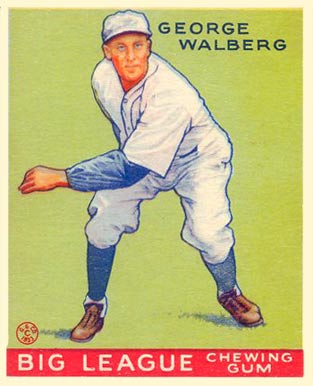
- Goudey baseball card, 1933 Series, #183
- Pitcher
- Born: July 27, 1896; Pine City, Minnesota, U.S.
- Died: October 27, 1978 (aged 82); Tempe, Arizona, U.S.
- Batted: Left Threw: Left

MLB debut
- April 29, 1923, for the New York Giants

Last MLB appearance
- October 2, 1937, for the Boston Red Sox

MLB statistics
- Win–loss record: 155–141
- Earned run average: 4.16
- Strikeouts: 1,085
- Stats at Baseball Reference

Teams
- New York Giants (1923); Philadelphia Athletics (1923–1933); Boston Red Sox (1934–1937)

Career highlights and awards
- 2× World Series champion (1929, 1930); Philadelphia Baseball Wall of Fame

George Elvin Walberg (July 27, 1896 – October 27, 1978) was an American professional baseball player. He played in Major League Baseball as a left-handed pitcher from 1923 through 1937, most notably as a member of the Philadelphia Athletics dynasty that won three consecutive American League pennants from 1929 to 1931, along with the World Series in 1929 and 1930. Walberg also pitched for the New York Giants and the Boston Red Sox.

== Baseball career ==
Walberg was born in Pine City, Minnesota. In 1923, Walberg was purchased by the New York Giants for $15,000. After a short stint with the Giants, Walberg was sent back to the Portland Beavers of the Pacific Coast League to the Philadelphia Athletics in 1923 for the wavier price ($4,500). A consistent and durable pitcher, Walberg averaged 16 wins for the Philadelphia Athletics of Connie Mack from 1926 to 1932, with career-highs of 20 wins in 1931. He also had a 1–1 mark with a 1.93 ERA for the Athletics in five World Series appearances. During the clinching Game 5 of the 1929 World Series, Walberg entered the game during the fourth inning to replace Howard Ehmke. Walberg would pitch the rest of game, allowing only two hits and even retiring the side on three pitches during the seventh inning. The Athletics would win the game and the World Series on a walk-off hit from Bing Miller, with Walberg being credited as the winning pitcher.

A good-hitting pitcher, Walberg collected a .179 batting average with four home runs and 84 runs batted in. When Mack dismantled the Athletics in 1933, he was sent along with Lefty Grove and Max Bishop to the Boston Red Sox in exchange for two players and $150.000. He was a spot starter and reliever with Boston during three seasons and pitched his last game at the age of 41.

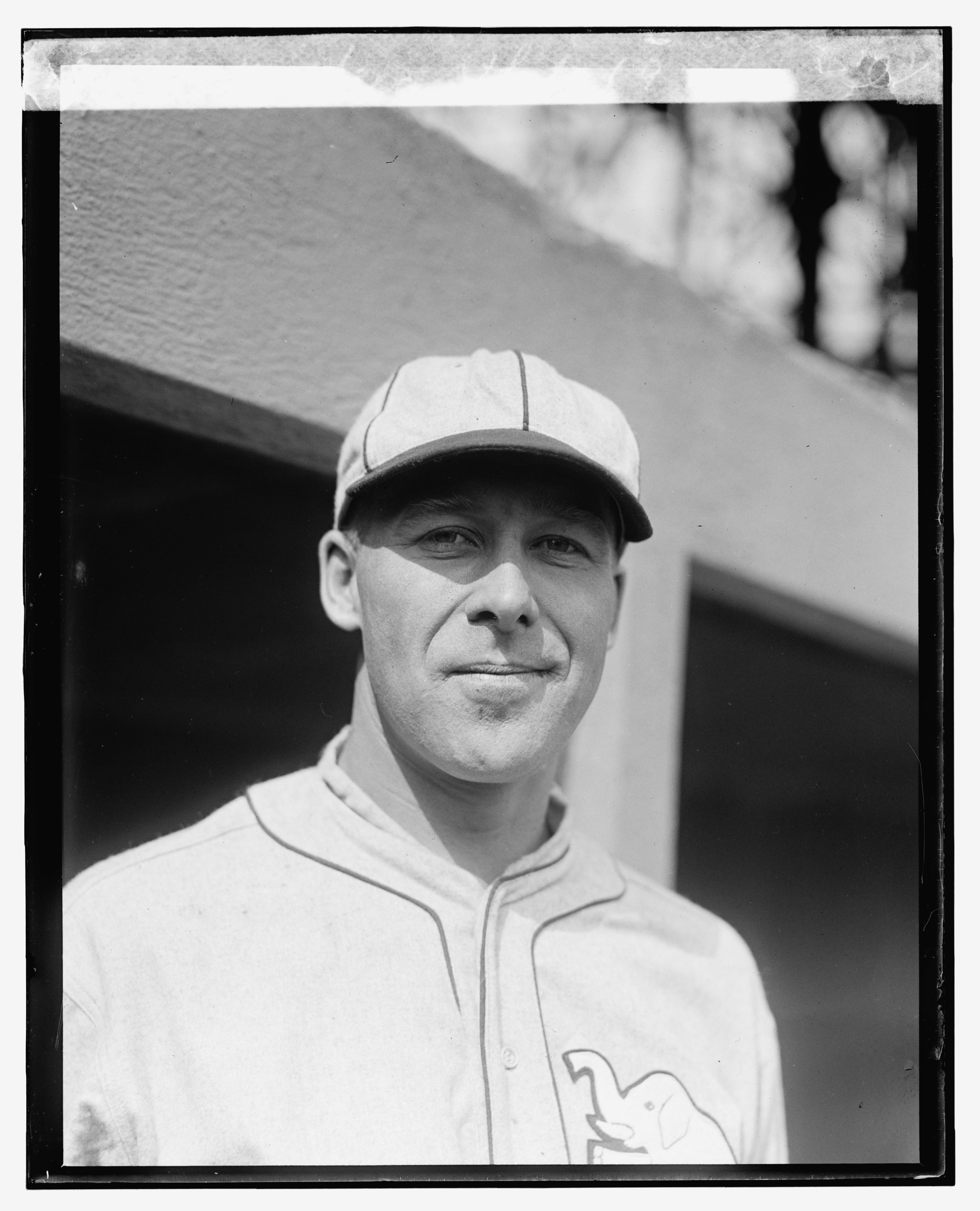
Rube Walberg

In a fifteen-season major league career, Walberg posted a 155–141 record with 1085 strikeouts and a 4.16 ERA in 2,644 innings, including 15 shutouts and 140 complete games. Walberg received 0.4% of the vote in both the 1958 and 1960 Baseball Hall of Fame elections.

Walberg surrendered 17 home runs to Babe Ruth, more than any other pitcher. Ruth himself claimed to have hit 23 home runs off of Walberg, although this is not backed by the statistical record.

Walberg died in Tempe, Arizona at age 82. In 2002, he was inducted into the Philadelphia Baseball Wall of Fame.
