= Orval Grove =

American baseball player (1919–1992)

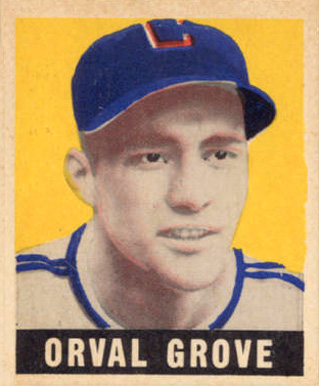
- Orval Grove in 1948
- Pitcher
- Born: August 29, 1919; West Mineral, Kansas, U.S.
- Died: April 20, 1992 (aged 72); Carmichael, California, U.S.
- Batted: Right Threw: Right

MLB debut
- May 28, 1940, for the Chicago White Sox

Last MLB appearance
- April 27, 1949, for the Chicago White Sox

MLB statistics
- Win–loss record: 63–73
- Earned run average: 3.78
- Strikeouts: 374
- Stats at Baseball Reference

Teams
- Chicago White Sox (1940–1949)

Career highlights and awards
- All-Star (1944)

Orval Leroy Grove (August 29, 1919 – April 20, 1992) was an American professional baseball player. He was a pitcher in Major League Baseball (MLB) for ten seasons in the American League with the Chicago White Sox. In 207 career games, Grove pitched 1,176 innings and posted a win–loss record of 63–73, with 66 complete games, 11 shutouts, and a 3.78 earned run average (ERA).

The only freshman on the Proviso Township High School varsity baseball team, Grove's pitching ability attracted the attention of the White Sox. After signing with the team in 1937, Grove moved between the major leagues and minor leagues for a few seasons until 1943, when he found a solid place in the White Sox's pitching rotation. Grove had a career-year in 1943, finishing the season with career-bests in ERA, wins, and complete games; in 1944, he made his only All-Star appearance.

Grove spent four more full seasons with the White Sox, and after pitching one game in 1949, was sent to the Sacramento Solons of the Pacific Coast League. After playing four seasons with them, he formally retired from professional baseball. After retirement, he worked with his uncle in a trucking business in Chicago while continuing to pitch at the semi-pro level. In 1992, Grove died at the age of 72.

== Early life ==
Grove was born in West Mineral, Kansas, on August 29, 1919, and was raised in Maywood, Illinois. By eighth grade, Grove developed a fondness for baseball and began pitching for the Proviso East High School baseball team. He became the first freshman member of the varsity team in school history. During a high school pitching career of three years, Grove lost only two games and pitched a no-hitter and two one-hitters. Over the summer of 1937, Grove attracted the attention of Chicago White Sox talent scout Doug Minor, who requested that he "come and workout with the Sox." Later that year, Grove was signed by the White Sox for $2,500 and began his minor league career, foregoing his senior season of high school.

== Minor league career ==
Grove began his career with the Dallas Steers of the Texas League at the start of the 1938 season. He played with the Steers until management began to replace young players with veterans due to the team's struggling form and moved Grove to the Longview Cannibals. As his first minor league season drew to a close, Grove planned on returning to Proviso High School to complete his education. At the end of the season, the St. Paul Saints purchased Grove's contract to replenish their pitching staff.

After the 1939 season had begun, Grove became part of the Oklahoma City Indians of the Texas League; St. Paul did not see much potential in him. Grove played well enough over the course of the season to receive votes for Most Valuable Player, which ultimately went to Nick Cullop. In 1939, Grove had a peculiar game while pitching against the Tulsa Oilers. Playing in a night game with virtually no light due to storms, Grove did not allow a hit during his time on the mound, but earned the loss because he walked three men in a row, which allowed a run to score. As the 1940 season began, Grove became a part of the White Sox roster and began his Major League career.

== Transition to the majors ==
During spring training in 1940, Hall of Fame pitcher Ted Lyons said that Grove would have a great career, stating, "They'll never drive that sinker very far." Grove was an official part of the 40-man roster as the 1940 season began (teams started rather than ended the season with 40 men at this time), but had not made an appearance after a month on the roster. The White Sox planned to use three rookie pitchers, including Grove, during the final week of May, as they had three doubleheaders that week. Grove made his Major League debut on May 28, 1940. He pitched in two more games for the White Sox that season before being sent back to Oklahoma City. Grove finished 1940 with six innings of major league work over three games, allowing two earned runs. The highlight of Grove's 1940 season came on August 11 against the Oilers; he pitched a complete game that lasted 12 innings, winning 1–0 against Hall of Famer Dizzy Dean. Grove finished the minor league season with nine wins and eight losses, but the team saw issues with his control, and as a result he spent most of the next season in the minor leagues.

In 1941, Grove played two games for the White Sox, pitching seven innings and allowing eight runs during the two outings. He spent the start of the 1941 season at Oklahoma City, though on May 19 he was sent to the Shreveport Sports of the Texas League, where he spent the rest of the season. Grove concluded the year at Oklahoma City with a 17–7 record, an improvement over the previous season. However, Grove received a knee injury late in the season, which he did not think much of at the time. In October, Grove injured his other knee when he was involved in an automobile accident in Missouri.

The following season, Grove was provided an opportunity to be a starting pitcher for the White Sox. Over the course of the season, he started eight games and played in four more en route to a 4–6 record and a 5.16 ERA. In the middle of July, Dr. Philip Kruescher discovered that Grove had torn cartilage in his left knee, a result of the same injury which caused him problems for most of the season and the previous off-season. Grove was scheduled for knee surgery, which necessitated two months of recovery, effectively ending his season. Issues with his knee drew concern both during and after the season. Dr. Kruescher stated that Grove had a "1 in 100" chance of playing again, but the surgery was a success, and by season's end Grove was able to test the knee and do light workouts. Complications arose shortly thereafter as an abscess developed on the back of his knee, prompting another operation in December to correct the problem.

== Prime years ==
As the 1943 season began, the White Sox held strong doubts about Grove's status as a pitcher. They were so doubtful of his recovery from knee surgery that Grove was signed to a $1 contract until he could prove that his playing ability was back on par with the abilities of the other White Sox pitchers. After Grove proved himself in spring training, manager Jimmy Dykes gave him his first major test of the season against the New York Yankees in relief of Eddie Smith. He won the game in extra innings, and was placed in the starting rotation. In 1943, Grove had to deal with issues related to World War II and the selective service. He was originally classified as 3-A, meaning that registration was deferred due to hardship to dependents, but was ordered to take the selective service screening examination in Cleveland in mid-May. After the examination, Grove was classified as 4-F, making him ineligible for military service, which meant that he could continue his baseball career.

Grove took advantage of his place in Chicago's starting rotation by winning nine consecutive decisions to start his season and by not losing a game until a contest against the Yankees, which he lost as the result of a balk. At the time, Grove became the second member of the White Sox to win nine consecutive decisions to start a season. The first pitcher to win nine straight games for the team was Lefty Williams in 1917, and the only one to do it since Grove was LaMarr Hoyt in 1982. On July 8, 1943, Grove nearly became one of the few pitchers in baseball history to pitch a no-hitter. In a game against the Yankees, he was one out away from pitching a no-hitter when Joe Gordon came up to bat. Gordon hit a double to left field that was fair by inches, ending Grove's closest bid for a Major League no-hitter. Grove finished the season with career bests in ERA (2.75), wins (15), and complete games (18). He led the White Sox that season in ERA, wins, innings pitched, complete games, and strikeouts; at the time, Grove was the youngest pitcher on the team's staff. Grove's personal life improved along with his career. On January 8, 1944, he married Catherine Sloan, having met her at a party thrown for the White Sox by her father, Francis Sloan, a year and a half earlier.

Grove started the 1944 season with an interesting honor: he was assigned to the 4-F All-Star team, a group of 25 major league players who were the best of those exempt from military service. Grove was given the job of being the Opening Day starting pitcher for the White Sox. He pitched the first game of the season against the Cleveland Indians and their starting pitcher, Al Smith, on April 19, 1944, and won 3–1. Grove also managed to shut out the Yankees on May 18; it was the first time the Yankees had not scored a run in 1944. By mid-season, Grove had seven wins, six losses, five complete games, and a 3.40 ERA. Because of these statistics, he was selected to the American League All-Star team, his first and only career appearance. Five American League pitchers pitched in the All-Star Game on July 11, although Grove was one of the four on the roster who did not; therefore, his lone All-Star appearance was indeed only an appearance. During the second half of the season, Grove performed well at Comiskey Park, but struggled on the road, at one point losing five straight games despite good run support from the White Sox. Grove finished the season with 14 wins, 15 losses, an ERA of 3.72, two shutouts, and a career best of nearly 235 innings pitched.

There was a sense of closure for Grove before the beginning of the 1945 season, as he was awarded $310 ($5,544 today) in damages for the auto accident in 1941. He held out for a new contract in the off-season, and finally signed with the White Sox a couple weeks before the beginning of the season after becoming the last remaining holdout. Grove was the workhorse of the White Sox, leading the team in games pitched (33) and started (30), while remaining the youngest pitcher on the roster. He finished the season with 217 pitched innings, a career best four shutouts, a 14–12 record, and a 3.44 ERA.

The 1946 season saw Grove persist as a stable part of the White Sox pitching rotation. He pitched in 33 games during the season, second to closer Earl Caldwell, and started in 26, second to Ed Lopat's 29. His best outing of the season occurred on August 3 against the Washington Senators. Grove pitched a complete game and threw to the minimum 27 batters, allowing three hits and a walk, all of which were negated by double plays. He finished the season with more losses than wins because he was eager to succeed and was trying too hard, and because of this the coaching staff planned to make Grove into "as good a pitcher most of the time as he is some of the time". At the end of the 1946 season, Grove had eight wins and 13 losses, a 3.02 ERA, 10 complete games, and a league-leading 10 wild pitches.

== Later career ==
During the off-season, while preparations were underway for the 1947 season, Grove was the subject of trade discussions. Most notably, White Sox manager Ted Lyons and Cleveland Indians president Bill Veeck discussed trading him for Indians pitcher Steve Gromek, but the deal was nixed when they could not come to an agreement. As the season began, Grove remained part of the rotation, which was led by Lopat and included Joe Haynes and Frank Papish. While Grove started off the season well, he struggled through the middle of the year, going from May 18 to August 2 without winning a game. As a result, he was benched, and finished the season with 19 starts in 25 pitching appearances. For the first time, Grove finished a full season with an ERA above 4.00. He ended the season with six wins, eight losses, a 4.44 ERA, and six complete games. Grove spent the off-season working in the men's furnishings department of Henry C. Lytton's department store in Chicago.

In the 1948 season, the White Sox faced difficult decisions regarding their pitching staff and starting rotation. In the midst of Caldwell's departure and Papish's absence for most of the preseason, Grove remained a starter heading into the season, having pitched decently during spring training. In his final exhibition matchup of the season against Johnny Schmitz, Grove pitched the full nine innings and the White Sox defeated the Chicago Cubs 1–0, making Grove the only White Sox pitcher to throw a complete game during the preseason. By the end of May, Grove was the lone White Sox pitcher with a complete game through the first several weeks of the season. However, Grove eventually lost his starting job, and by the end of the season, he had two wins, 10 losses, a 6.16 ERA, and had started 11 games out of 32 total pitching appearances.

As the 1949 season began, Grove was again the subject of trade rumors. The Detroit Tigers agreed to trade an outfielder, presumably Don Lund or Jimmy Outlaw, in exchange for Grove, although the Tigers denied the existence of such a deal, stating "We need pitching, but I don't think Grove would help us." Grove pitched one game during the season on April 27, 1949, allowing four runs in two-thirds of an inning. In his one appearance against the Indians, he hit Lou Boudreau with a pitch, which prompted concern until X-rays revealed Boudreau's left elbow was only bruised.

Shortly afterward, Grove was demoted to the Sacramento Solons of the Pacific Coast League, having pitched his final major league game. During his inaugural season at Sacramento, he was part of a pitching quartet that included Ken Holcombe, Bob Gillespie, and Frank Dasso, and was declared by Sporting News sportswriter John B. Old as "the best any Coast League club ever had." Over the course of the next three seasons, Grove continued to pitch for the Solons. He was one of the workhorses of the 1950 squad, finishing the season with 17 victories.

His contract with the Solons promised him part of the purchase price if he was sold to the majors. When this did not occur, he considered quitting baseball and devoting himself full-time to his uncle's trucking business. However, Grove continued to play, and pitched 159 innings in 1951, compiling an 8–9 record. There was talk of his retiring in the off-season; however, Grove ended up playing part of the 1952 season, making his season debut on June 10 and playing for the rest of the season. After the season ended, Grove was traded to the Portland Beavers, and refused to report, choosing instead to pitch at the semi-pro level. Grove stated, "I'm now pitching for Earl Smith Motors Pontiac sales service", signaling the end of his professional baseball career.

== Later life ==
After his retirement from baseball, Grove continued to work with his uncle. His legacy lived on in his nephew, Wayne Grove. While playing for the Bellwood Lions of the Chicago Little League, Wayne pitched a no-hitter and struck out 15, and narrowly missed a perfect game when a runner got on base with two outs in the bottom of the ninth inning. Despite an unimpressive Major League career, Grove earned a few votes for induction into the Hall of Fame, receiving five votes in the 1958 balloting (1.9% of the required votes needed) and seven in the 1960 balloting (2.6% of the required votes needed).

Grove had four children and four grandchildren, and later was the co-owner of a car wash in Sacramento, California for 20 years. He became close friends with Joe Gordon, the player who broke up Grove's no-hitter, after moving to Sacramento. Grove died in Carmichael, California on April 20, 1992, and is buried alongside his wife, Catherine.

== See also ==
- List of Major League Baseball players who spent their entire career with one franchise
