= 1933 World Series =

1933 Major League Baseball championship series

Team (Wins)	Managers	Season
New York Giants (4)	Bill Terry (player/manager)	91–61, .599, GA: 5
Washington Senators (1)	Joe Cronin (player/manager)	99–53, .651, GA: 7
- Dates: October 3–7
- Venue(s): Polo Grounds (New York); Griffith Stadium (Washington)
- Umpires: Charley Moran (NL), George Moriarty (AL), Cy Pfirman (NL), Red Ormsby (AL)
- Hall of Famers: Giants: Carl Hubbell; Travis Jackson; Mel Ott; Bill Terry; Lefty O'Doul; Senators: Joe Cronin; Goose Goslin; Heinie Manush; Sam Rice

Broadcast
- Radio: NBC; CBS
- Radio announcers: NBC: Hal Totten; Tom Manning; Graham McNamee; CBS: Fred Hoey; France Laux; Roger Baker; Ted Husing

The 1933 World Series was the championship series of the 1933 Major League Baseball season. The 30th edition of the World Series, it matched the National League (NL) pennant winner New York Giants and the American League (AL) pennant winner Washington Senators. The Giants defeated the Senators in five games for their first championship since 1922 and their fourth overall. Key to the Giants' World Series triumph was the pitching of aces "King" Carl Hubbell and "Prince" Hal Schumacher.

This would be the last World Series played in Washington, D.C., until 2019. The Giants next won the World Series in 1954, their final title in New York City as the franchise moved to San Francisco after the 1957 season.

== Background ==
New York Giants majority owner John McGraw retired as manager in 1932 after 30 years at the helm, naming his protégé, young star first baseman Bill Terry, recently the last .400 hitter in the National League, as his player-manager successor. Somewhat similarly, former superstar hurler Walter Johnson also retired in 1932 as Washington Senators manager in favor of young star shortstop Joe Cronin as their new player-manager. (McGraw watched the Series from the stands, and died four months later.)

The Senators were the surprise team of 1933, breaking a seven-year monopoly on the AL title jointly held by the New York Yankees and Philadelphia Athletics from 1926 to 1932. But this could also be called a joint 13-year monopoly by all three, since the Senators had also won in 1924 and 1925 and the Yankees won from 1921 to 1923. 43-year-old future Hall of Famer Sam Rice, in his last year with the Senators, had only one at bat during the series, picking up a pinch hit single in the second game.

== Summary ==
NL New York Giants (4) vs. AL Washington Senators (1)

Game	Date	Score	Location	Time	Attendance
1	October 3	Washington Senators – 2, New York Giants – 4	Polo Grounds	2:07	46,672
2	October 4	Washington Senators – 1, New York Giants – 6	Polo Grounds	2:09	35,461
3	October 5	New York Giants – 0, Washington Senators – 4	Griffith Stadium	1:55	25,727
4	October 6	New York Giants – 2, Washington Senators – 1 (11)	Griffith Stadium	2:59	26,762
5	October 7	New York Giants – 4, Washington Senators – 3 (10)	Griffith Stadium	2:38	28,454

== Matchups ==
=== Game 1 ===
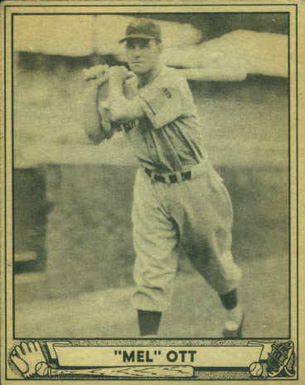
Mel Ott

October 3, 1933 1:30 pm (ET) at Polo Grounds in Manhattan, New York
Team	1	2	3	4	5	6	7	8	9	R	H	E
Washington	0	0	0	1	0	0	0	0	1	2	5	3
New York	2	0	2	0	0	0	0	0	X	4	10	2
WP: Carl Hubbell (1–0) LP: Lefty Stewart (0–1); Home runs: WSH: None; NYG: Mel Ott (1)

Mel Ott had four hits and three RBI in Game 1, hitting a two-run home run in the first and RBI single in the third with two on, all off Lefty Stewart. Travis Jackson scored the Giants' last run on a groundout off Jack Russell. Carl Hubbell struck out ten, allowed two unearned runs (on groundouts by Joe Cronin in the fourth with two on and Joe Kuhel with the bases loaded in the ninth) and pitched a five-hitter.

=== Game 2 ===
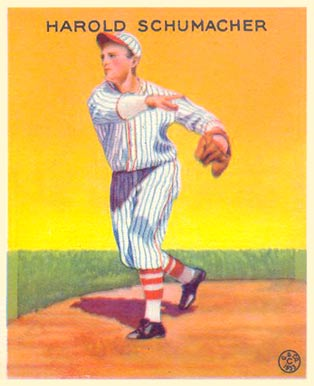
Hal Schumacher

October 4, 1933 1:30 pm (ET) at Polo Grounds in Manhattan, New York
Team	1	2	3	4	5	6	7	8	9	R	H	E
Washington	0	0	1	0	0	0	0	0	0	1	5	0
New York	0	0	0	0	0	6	0	0	X	6	10	0
WP: Hal Schumacher (1–0) LP: General Crowder (0–1); Home runs: WSH: Goose Goslin (1); NYG: None

The Giants overcame a 1–0 deficit (as a result of Goose Goslin's third inning home run) with a six-run sixth inning. They loaded the bases with no outs on a single, double and intentional walk off General Crowder before Lefty O'Doul hit a pinch-hit single that scored two runs. RBI singles by Travis Jackson, Gus Mancuso, Hal Schumacher and Jo-Jo Moore each scored a run. Hal Schumacher pitched a five-hitter for a 6–1 victory, giving New York a 2–0 lead.

=== Game 3 ===
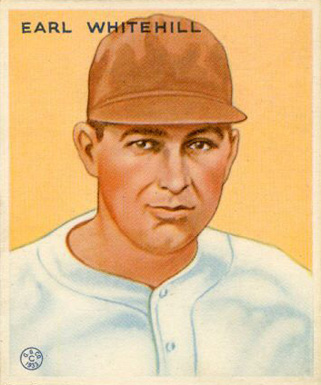
Earl Whitehill

October 5, 1933 1:30 pm (ET) at Griffith Stadium in Washington, D.C.
Team	1	2	3	4	5	6	7	8	9	R	H	E
New York	0	0	0	0	0	0	0	0	0	0	5	0
Washington	2	1	0	0	0	0	1	0	X	4	9	1
WP: Earl Whitehill (1–0) LP: Freddie Fitzsimmons (0–1)

The Senators scored two runs in the first inning on Joe Cronin's RBI groundout with runners on second and third followed by Fred Schulte's RBI double. Next inning, Ossie Bluege hit a leadoff double and scored on Buddy Myer's double. They got one more run in the seventh when Luke Sewell singled, stole second, moved to third on a groundout and scored on Myer's double. Earl Whitehill held New York to five hits in the shutout. To date, this is the last World Series game in which a Washington team won at home.

=== Game 4 ===
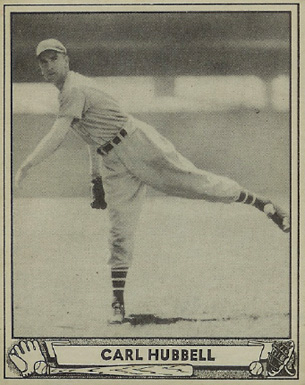
Carl Hubbell

October 6, 1933 1:30 pm (ET) at Griffith Stadium in Washington, D.C.
Team	1	2	3	4	5	6	7	8	9	10	11	R	H	E
New York	0	0	0	1	0	0	0	0	0	0	1	2	11	1
Washington	0	0	0	0	0	0	1	0	0	0	0	1	8	0
WP: Carl Hubbell (2–0) LP: Monte Weaver (0–1); Home runs: NYG: Bill Terry (1); WSH: None

Carl Hubbell went all eleven innings in the 2–1 win. He induced Cliff Bolton to ground out into a bases-loaded, game ending double play. Bill Terry's home run off Monte Weaver put the Giants up 1–0 in the fourth, but the Senators tied the score in the seventh when Joe Kuhel reached on an error, moved to second on a sacrifice bunt and scored on Luke Sewell's single. Travis Jackson singled to lead off the 11th, moved to second on a sacrifice bunt, and scored the game winning run on Blondy Ryan's single.

=== Game 5 ===
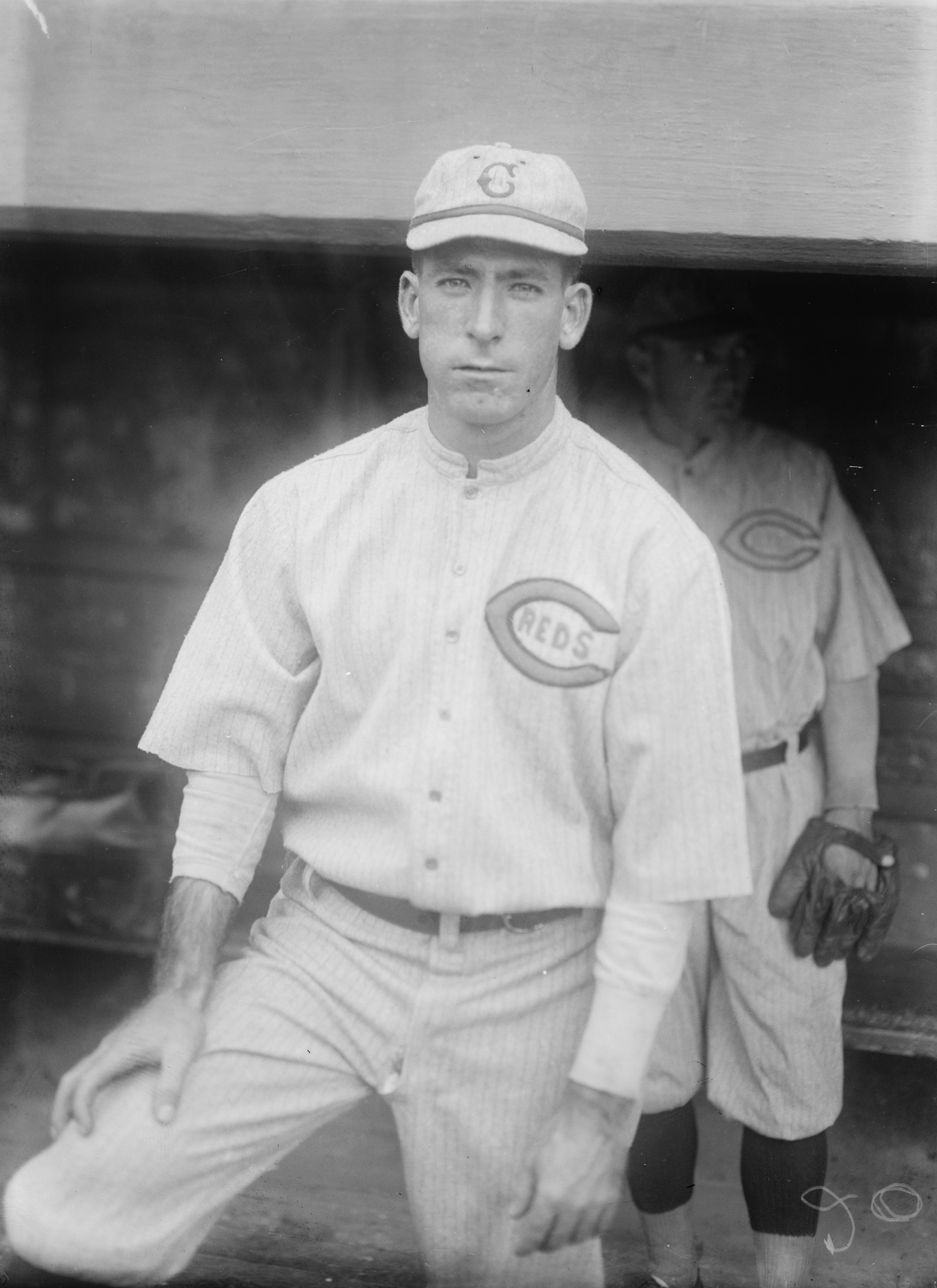
Dolf Luque

October 7, 1933 1:30 pm (ET) at Griffith Stadium in Washington, D.C.
Team	1	2	3	4	5	6	7	8	9	10	R	H	E
New York	0	2	0	0	0	1	0	0	0	1	4	11	1
Washington	0	0	0	0	0	3	0	0	0	0	3	10	0
WP: Dolf Luque (1–0) LP: Jack Russell (0–1); Home runs: NYG: Mel Ott (2); WSH: Fred Schulte (1)

In the second, Hal Schumacher's two-run single with runners on second and third put the Giants up 2–0 off General Crowder. Kiddo Davis hit a leadoff double in the sixth and scored on Gus Mancuso's double to extend the lead to 3–0. Fred Schulte hit a game-tying three run homer in the sixth after two, two-out singles. for the Senators. Mel Ott's second home run of the series in the tenth off Jack Russell won the Series for New York. Dolf Luque earned the win with 4 1/3 shutout innings of relief for Schumacher.

== Composite line score ==
1933 World Series (4–1): New York Giants (N.L.) beat Washington Senators (A.L.)

Team	1	2	3	4	5	6	7	8	9	10	11	R	H	E
New York Giants	2	2	2	1	0	7	0	0	0	1	1	16	47	4
Washington Senators	2	1	1	1	0	3	2	0	1	0	0	11	37	4
Home runs: NYG: Mel Ott (2), Bill Terry (1); WSH: Goose Goslin (1), Fred Schulte (1); Total attendance: 163,076 Average attendance: 32,615; Winning player's share: $4,257 Losing player's share: $3,020

At the time, the winning margin of five runs was second-lowest for a five-game series (later equaled in 1942 and 1974); the 1915 margin was two runs, and three runs in 2000.

== Aftermath ==
This was the last time postseason baseball was played in the nation’s capital until 2012, when the Washington Nationals (formerly the Montreal Expos) captured the #1 seed in the National League but were upset in the NLDS after being one strike away from eliminating the St. Louis Cardinals after their early 6–0 lead had evaporated. The Nationals would eventually win the World Series in 2019 in a major upset over a 107-win Houston Astros team in seven games, which ended a 95-year championship drought for the nation’s capital, dating back to the Senators' only title in 1924.

This first Washington Senators franchise became the Minnesota Twins during the 1960–61 offseason, and would not reach the World Series again until 1965, where they fell to the Los Angeles Dodgers in seven games. The Twins would eventually win the World Series again in 1987 over the St. Louis Cardinals in seven games after being five innings away from elimination in Game 7, ending a 63-year championship drought.

The second Washington Senators, inaugurated in 1961 to replace the first edition on its way to Minnesota, became the Texas Rangers in 1972, who were also defeated four games to one in their first World Series ever by the now San Francisco Giants in 2010. The Rangers were then defeated again in 2011 by the St. Louis Cardinals in seven games after being a strike away from the championship twice in Game 6. On their third attempt in 2023, they defeated the Arizona Diamondbacks in five games.

== Sources ==
- Cohen, Richard M.; Neft, David S. (1990). The World Series: Complete Play-By-Play of Every Game, 1903–1989. New York: St. Martin's Press. pp. 147–150. ISBN 0-312-03960-3.
- Reichler, Joseph (1982). The Baseball Encyclopedia (5th ed.). Macmillan Publishing. p. 2141. ISBN 0-02-579010-2.
- Sarnoff, Gary A. (2009). The Wrecking Crew of '33: The Washington Senators' Last Pennant (1st ed.). McFarland & Company. ISBN 978-0-7864-4291-1.
