= George Kelly (baseball) =

American baseball player (1895–1984)

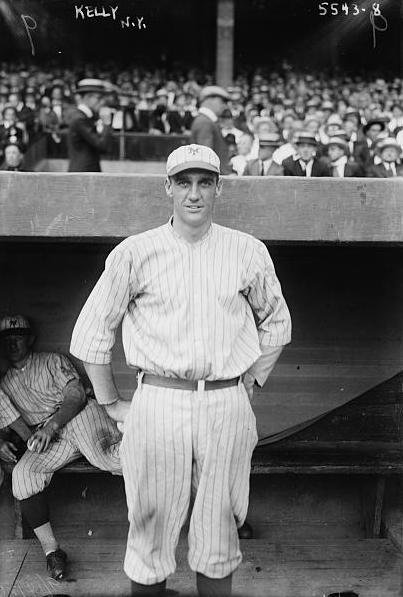
- Kelly in 1920
- First baseman
- Born: September 10, 1895; San Francisco, California, U.S.
- Died: October 13, 1984 (aged 89); Burlingame, California, U.S.
- Batted: Right Threw: Right

MLB debut
- August 18, 1915, for the New York Giants

Last MLB appearance
- July 27, 1932, for the Brooklyn Dodgers

MLB statistics
- Batting average: .297
- Home runs: 148
- Runs batted in: 1,020
- Stats at Baseball Reference

Teams
- New York Giants (1915–1917); Pittsburgh Pirates (1917); New York Giants (1919–1926); Cincinnati Reds (1927–1930); Chicago Cubs (1930); Brooklyn Dodgers (1932)

Career highlights and awards
- 2× World Series champion (1921, 1922); NL home run leader (1921); 2× NL RBI leader (1920, 1924)

Member of the National

Baseball Hall of Fame
- Induction: 1973
- Election method: Veterans Committee

George Lange Kelly (September 10, 1895 – October 13, 1984), nicknamed "Long George" and "High Pockets", was an American professional baseball first baseman. He played most of his Major League Baseball (MLB) career for the New York Giants (1915–1917, 1919–1926), but also played for the Pittsburgh Pirates (1917), Cincinnati Reds (1927–1930), Chicago Cubs (1930), and Brooklyn Dodgers (1932). Kelly threw and batted right-handed, and was listed as a lanky 6 feet 4 inches (1.93 m) tall—the source of his nicknames—and 190 pounds (86 kg).

Kelly was a two-time World Series champion (1921 and 1922). He led the National League in home runs once (1921) and runs batted in twice (1920 and 1924), and was elected to the Baseball Hall of Fame in 1973. However, his selection is regarded as controversial, as many believe he was undeserving of the recognition and was only elected by the Veterans Committee because it consisted of his former teammates.

== Playing career ==
Kelly began his professional career for the Victoria Bees of the Class-B Northwestern League in 1914 and 1915. During the 1915 season, he was purchased by the New York Giants from Victoria for $1,200 (equal to $37,299 today). The Giants were rebuilding their team, and they saw Kelly as a possible replacement for Fred Merkle. However, he played sparingly for the Giants in his first MLB seasons, appearing in only 17 games in 1915 and 49 games in 1916. He was selected off waivers by the Pittsburgh Pirates on July 25, 1917, to back up Honus Wagner, but did not hit sufficiently. The Pirates waived Kelly, and he was reclaimed by the Giants from the Pirates on August 4, 1917. The Giants optioned Kelly to the Rochester Hustlers of the Class-AA International League, where he played the rest of the 1917 season. Kelly did not play professionally in 1918 due to his military service. The Giants sold Kelly to Rochester before the 1919 season to acquire Earl Smith.

Finding success in Rochester, Kelly was purchased by the Giants in 1919 when Hal Chase was suspended. He became a regular in the Giants line-up in 1920, when he had a league-leading 94 runs batted in (RBI). He led the league in assists and putouts in 1920 and 1921; his 1,759 putouts in 1920 remains a league record. Kelly batted in 100 or more runs for four consecutive seasons and hit for a batting average of .300 or higher six consecutive seasons. He opened the 1921 season with at least one hit and one RBI in eight consecutive games, a record that stood until it was broken by Jorge Cantú in 2010. The Giants appeared in the World Series in 1921, 1922, 1923, and 1924, winning in 1921 and 1922. Kelly set a National League record with seven home runs in six consecutive games in 1924, which has since been matched by Graig Nettles, Walker Cooper, and Willie Mays.

In the final series of the 1924 season, the Giants were playing the Philadelphia Phillies at the Polo Grounds and battling for the pennant with the Brooklyn Dodgers. Jimmy O'Connell offered Phillies shortstop Heinie Sand $500 to intentionally lose the games. Sand rejected the bribe and reported it to Phillies manager Art Fletcher. It eventually led to the lifetime suspension of O'Connell and Giants coach Cozy Dolan by Commissioner Kenesaw Mountain Landis. O'Connell implicated Kelly, Frankie Frisch, and Ross Youngs as co-conspirators. However, Commissioner Landis cleared Kelly, Frisch, and Youngs of any wrongdoing.

That following offseason, Kelly, Sam Bohne, and other Major League Baseball (MLB) players agreed to play professional basketball with O'Connell. National League (NL) president John Heydler insisted that anyone who played with O'Connell could be suspended. The Giants were also displeased with Kelly's arrangement, as they were concerned about the chance he could injure himself in non-baseball activity. However, Kelly had not played in any games at that point. He was removed from the roster and thus avoided suspension by MLB.

Kelly, naturally a first baseman, saw regular time as a second baseman in 1925 when Frisch injured his hand, while backup Bill Terry began playing first base. With the emergence of Terry, who requested a trade so that he could receive more playing time, and Giants manager John McGraw desiring an improvement in the outfield, Kelly was traded to the Cincinnati Reds prior to the 1927 season for Edd Roush. The Reds traded Roush due to a contract dispute. With Wally Pipp at first base for the Reds, Kelly was slated to play center field. The Reds released Pipp before the 1929 season, and Kelly returned to first base.

Kelly was released by the Reds on July 10, 1930, and signed by the minor-league Minneapolis Millers of the Class-AA American Association. The Millers traded Kelly to the Chicago Cubs for Mal Moss and a player to be named later (Chick Tolson) late in the 1930 season to fill in for the injured Charlie Grimm. Kelly was released by the Cubs in February 1931. He returned to the Millers for the 1931 season, and participated in a tour of Japan along with Frisch, Lou Gehrig, Mickey Cochrane, Al Simmons, Lefty Grove, and Rabbit Maranville, among others.

In April 1932, the Millers traded Kelly to the Brooklyn Dodgers for Pea Ridge Day. With the Dodgers, he filled in for the injured Del Bissonette. Kelly played his final MLB game on July 27, 1932. He returned to the International League to finish the 1932 season with the Jersey City Skeeters, and played the 1933 season for the Oakland Oaks of the Pacific Coast League before retiring.

== Player profile ==
In 1,622 games over 16 seasons, Kelly posted a .297 batting average (1,778-for-5,993) with 819 runs, 337 doubles, 76 triples, 148 home runs, 1,020 RBI, 65 stolen bases, 386 bases on balls, a .342 on-base percentage, and a .452 slugging percentage. He finished his career with a .992 fielding percentage at first base, his primary position, and a .991 fielding percentage overall playing also at second base and all three outfield positions. In 26 World Series games from 1921 to 1924, he batted .248 (25-for-101) with 11 runs, 2 doubles, 1 home run, 11 RBI, and 5 walks.

Kelly was known as an excellent defensive first baseman. His positioning and footwork on hits to the outfield became the standard method for teaching future first basemen to handle relays. Frisch considered Kelly the finest first baseman he had seen.

Kelly also had a reputation as a clutch hitter. McGraw said there was no player he preferred to have bat in a big situation. Waite Hoyt considered him dangerous in clutch situations.

== Hall of Fame induction ==
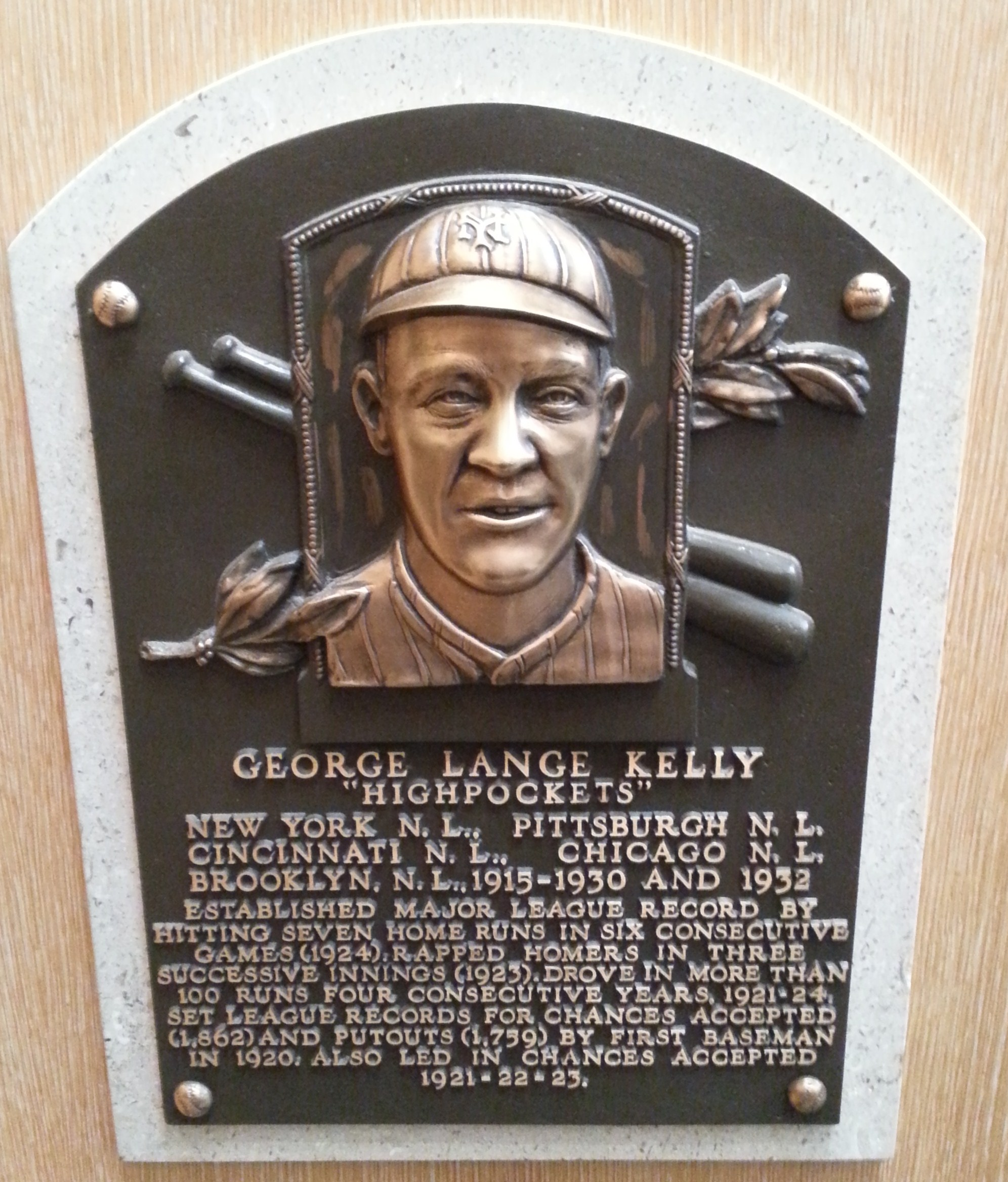
Kelly's plaque at the National Baseball Hall of Fame and Museum

His arm was so tremendous that he was directed to be the relay man on throws from the outfield. His arm was better, in fact, than any of today's players I can think of.

—Frankie Frisch, January 29, 1973

To be inducted into the National Baseball Hall of Fame, a player must receive at least 75% of the vote from the Baseball Writers' Association of America (BBWAA) or the Veterans Committee. Kelly was on the BBWAA ballot seven times, never coming close to being elected, and never garnering more than 1.9% of the vote. By year, voting results for Kelly were: 1947 (one vote, 0.6%), 1948 (two votes, 1.7%), 1949 (one vote, 0.7%), 1956 (two votes, 1.0%), 1958 (two votes, 0.8%), 1960 (five votes, 1.9%), and 1962 (two votes, 0.6%). Despite the lack of support from the BBWAA, he was inducted into the Hall of Fame in 1973 by the Veterans Committee. At the time of Kelly's election, the writers' ballot was voted on by approximately 400 writers, while the Veterans Committee had a membership of 12 former players and executives.

The selection of Kelly was controversial, as many felt Kelly was not worthy of enshrinement in the Hall. According to the BBWAA, the Veterans Committee was not selective enough in choosing members. Charges of cronyism were levied against the Veterans Committee. When Kelly was elected, the Veterans Committee included two of his former teammates, Bill Terry and Frankie Frisch, who also shepherded the selections of teammates Jesse Haines in 1970, Dave Bancroft and Chick Hafey in 1971, Ross Youngs in 1972, Jim Bottomley in 1974, and Freddie Lindstrom in 1976. This led to the Veterans Committee having its powers reduced in subsequent years. In 2001, baseball historian Bill James, while ranking Kelly as the 65th greatest first baseman of all time, also cited Kelly as the worst player in the Hall of Fame.

== Coaching career ==
Kelly served as a coach for the Cincinnati Reds, managed by former teammate Chuck Dressen, from 1935 to 1937. Former teammate Casey Stengel hired Kelly to coach the Boston Braves from 1938 to 1943. He returned to the Reds' coaching staff in 1947 and 1948. He coached the Oakland Oaks of the Pacific Coast League in 1949. In 1954, Kelly managed the independent Wenatchee Chiefs in the Western International League.

== Personal life ==
A native San Franciscan, Kelly remained in the San Francisco Bay Area, living in Millbrae, California, following his playing career. Kelly's brother, Ren Kelly, uncle, Bill Lange, and cousin, Rich Chiles, also played in MLB.

Kelly suffered a stroke on October 5, 1984, and died on October 13 at Peninsula Hospital in Burlingame, California. He is interred at the Holy Cross Cemetery in Colma, California. He was the last surviving member of the 1921 and 1922 world champion New York Giants.

== See also ==
- List of Major League Baseball annual home run leaders
- List of Major League Baseball annual runs batted in leaders
- List of Major League Baseball career runs batted in leaders
