= Freddy Leach =

American baseball player (1897-1981)

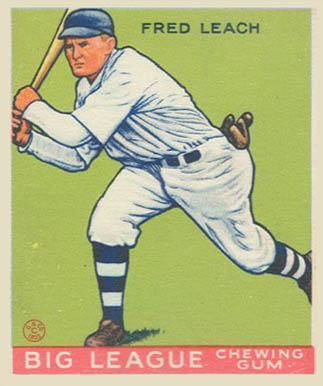
- Freddy Leach 1933 Goudey baseball card
- Outfielder
- Born: November 23, 1897; Springfield, Missouri, U.S.
- Died: December 10, 1981 (aged 84); Hagerman, Idaho, U.S.
- Batted: Left Threw: Right

MLB debut
- May 24, 1923, for the Philadelphia Phillies

Last MLB appearance
- September 20, 1932, for the Boston Braves

MLB statistics
- Batting average: .307
- Home runs: 72
- Runs batted in: 509
- Stats at Baseball Reference

Teams
- Philadelphia Phillies (1923–1928); New York Giants (1929–1931); Boston Braves (1932)

Frederick Leach (November 23, 1897 – December 10, 1981) was an American professional baseball player who played outfield in the Major Leagues from 1923 to 1932. He would play for the Philadelphia Phillies, New York Giants, and Boston Braves. He hit .300 or better six times, with a career high of .329 in 1926.

In a ten year career, Leach was in 991 games played, batted .307 (1147-3733), scoring 543 runs and collecting 509 RBI. His on-base percentage was .341 and slugging percentage was .446.
