= Glenn Wright =

American baseball player (1901–1984)

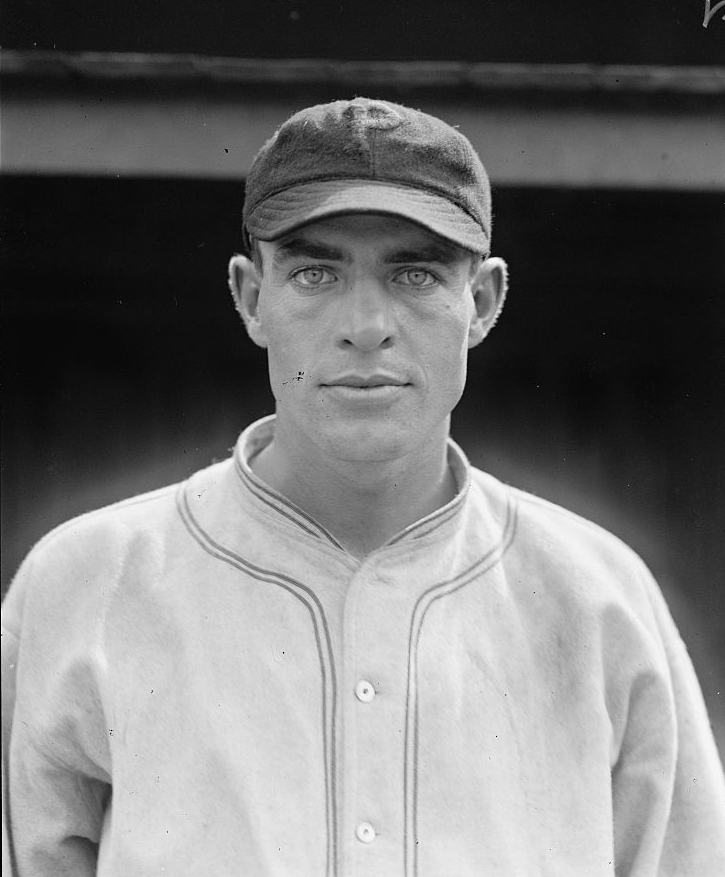
- Shortstop
- Born: February 6, 1901; Archie, Missouri, U.S.
- Died: April 6, 1984 (aged 83); Olathe, Kansas, U.S.
- Batted: Right Threw: Right

MLB debut
- April 15, 1924, for the Pittsburgh Pirates

Last MLB appearance
- June 4, 1935, for the Chicago White Sox

MLB statistics
- Batting average: .294
- Home runs: 94
- Runs batted in: 723
- Stats at Baseball Reference

Teams
- Pittsburgh Pirates (1924–1928); Brooklyn Robins / Dodgers (1929–1933); Chicago White Sox (1935)

Career highlights and awards
- World Series champion (1925)

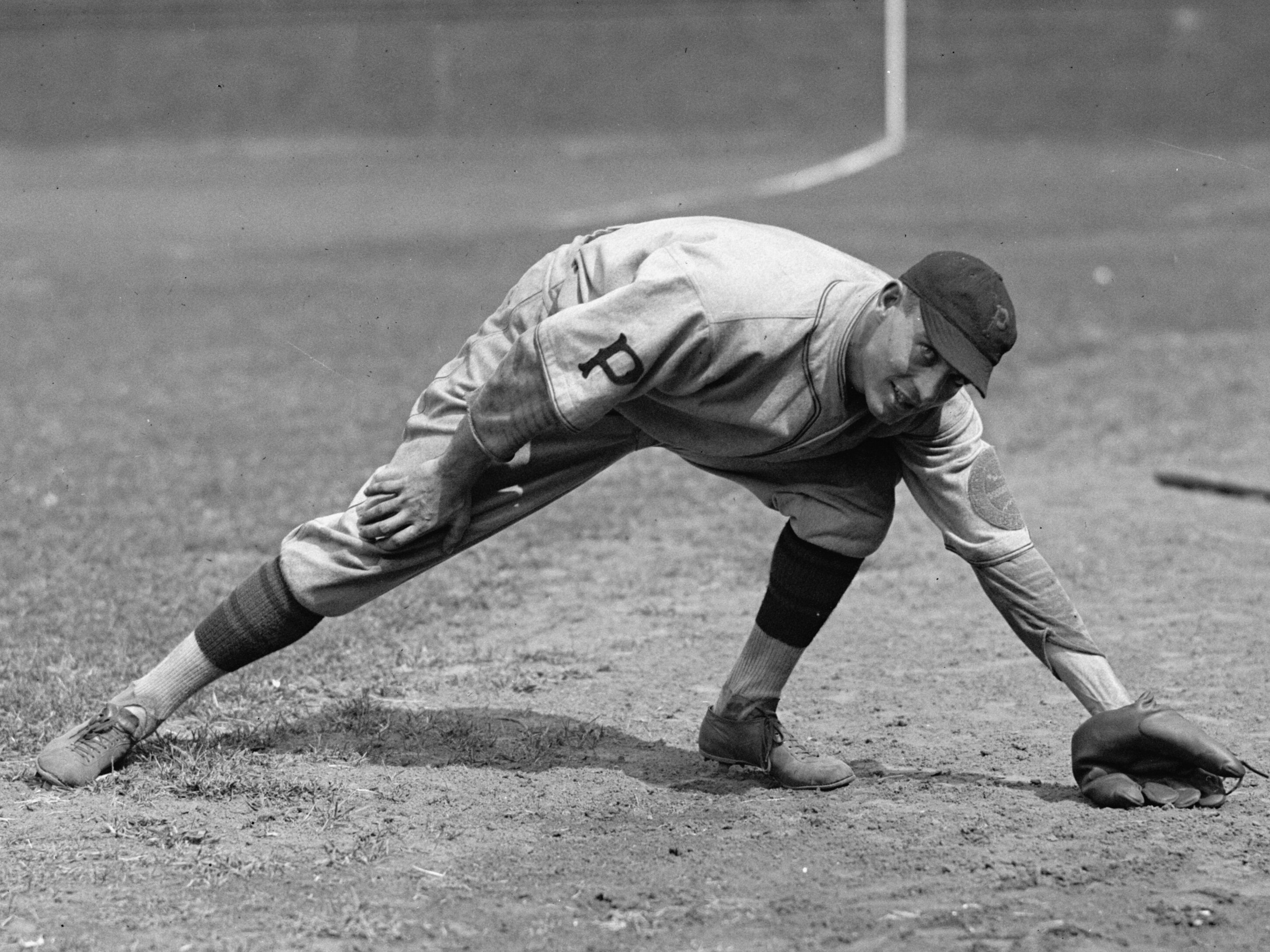
Wright in 1925

Forest Glenn Wright (February 6, 1901 – April 6, 1984) was an American professional baseball shortstop. He played in Major League Baseball from 1924 through 1935 for the Pittsburgh Pirates, Brooklyn Robins / Dodgers, and Chicago White Sox.

== Career ==
Wright was a standout minor league player for the Independence Producers in 1921, and for the Kansas City Blues in 1922–23. In his major league rookie year, he set the record for most assists (601) in a season which stood for 56 years (until broken by Ozzie Smith in 1980). On May 7, 1925, Wright recorded an unassisted triple play against the Cardinals, tagging out Jimmy Cooney and future Hall of Famers Jim Bottomley and Rogers Hornsby. That same year, he finished fourth in NL MVP voting behind Hornsby, Kiki Cuyler, and George Kelly. Wright was a member of the 1925 World Series champion Pittsburgh Pirates, homering off Hall of Fame spitballer Stan Coveleski in Game Two. He was the last surviving member of that 1925 team.

In 1927, Wright and the Pirates returned to the World Series but were swept in four straight games by the New York Yankees. In eleven career World Series games, Wright had only seven hits in 40 at-bats.

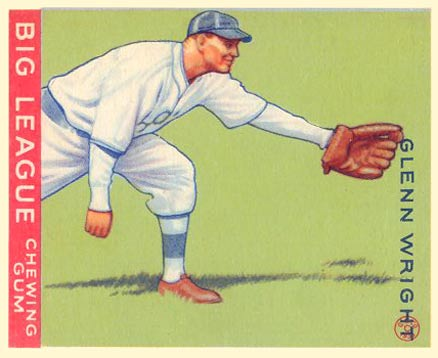
1933 Goudey baseball card of Glenn Wright

Wright was traded to the Brooklyn Robins in 1928 and named team captain the following season. His tenure in Brooklyn coincided with the name change from Brooklyn Robins to the Brooklyn Dodgers in 1932. Considered a premier shortstop of his generation, Wright suffered a major injury to his shoulder in 1929 which plagued him from then on and contributed to his relatively short career.

Despite his injury, Wright put up exceptional numbers in 1930, reaching career highs in batting average (.321), home runs (22), runs batted in (126), and slugging (.543). His 22 home runs were an NL single-season record for shortstops until 1953, when Alvin Dark hit 23 for the Giants.

He was released by the Dodgers after the 1933 season and rejoined the Blues for a season. In 1935, Wright was purchased from Kansas City by the White Sox, but was let go after hitting .120 in nine games. He continued to play in the minor leagues until 1939, mostly with the Wenatchee Chiefs of the International League, before retiring.

Wright finished his career with 1219 hits, 94 home runs, 723 runs batted in and a batting average of .294 over 11 seasons (4153 at bats). He spent the years after his playing days ended as a scout working for the Boston Red Sox until his retirement in 1974.
