= Mike González (catcher) =

Cuban baseball player (1890–1977)

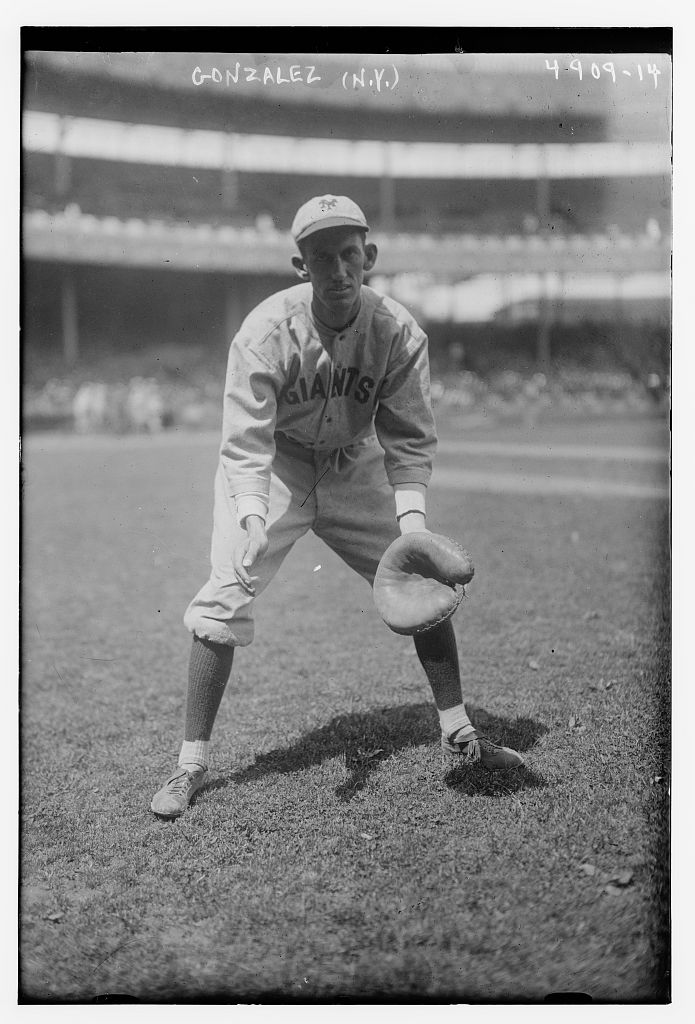
- González in 1920
- Catcher / Manager
- Born: September 24, 1890; Havana, Cuba
- Died: February 19, 1977 (aged 86); Havana, Cuba
- Batted: Right Threw: Right

MLB debut
- September 28, 1912, for the Boston Braves

Last MLB appearance
- September 7, 1932, for the St. Louis Cardinals

MLB statistics
- Batting average: .253
- Home runs: 13
- Runs batted in: 263
- Managerial record: 9–13
- Winning %: .409
- Stats at Baseball Reference

Teams
- As player: Boston Braves (1912); Cincinnati Reds (1914); St. Louis Cardinals (1915–1918); New York Giants (1919–1921); St. Louis Cardinals (1924–1925); Chicago Cubs (1925–1929); St. Louis Cardinals (1931–1932); As coach: St. Louis Cardinals (1934–1937, 1938–1946); As manager: St. Louis Cardinals (1938, 1940)

Career highlights and awards
- 4× World Series champion (1934, 1942, 1944, 1946)

Member of the Cuban

Baseball Hall of Fame
- Induction: 1955

Miguel Ángel González Cordero (September 24, 1890 – February 19, 1977) was a Cuban catcher, coach and interim manager in Major League Baseball (MLB) during the first half of the 20th century. Along with Adolfo Luque, González was one of the first Cubans or Latin Americans to have a long career in the American major leagues.

Born in Havana, González played winter league baseball in the Cuban League from 1910 to 1936 and was a long-time player-manager with Club Habana, which he led to 14 titles from 1914 to 1953. He was elected to the Cuban Baseball Hall of Fame in 1955.

== In the U.S.: catcher, coach and manager ==
González, a right-handed-hitting catcher, made his National League debut with the 1912 Boston Braves, playing only one game. During that time he played "Negro baseball" with integrated teams from Cuba, the Cuban Stars in 1911, 1912 and 1914, and the Long Branch Cubans in 1913. During his organized baseball career he also appeared with the New York Lincoln Giants in 1916.

González returned to the Major Leagues with the Cincinnati Reds in 1914 catching 83 games and hitting .233. During the 1914-15 Cuban winter league, Gonzalez became manager of the Havana Reds. Before the 1915 spring training, he was traded to the St. Louis Cardinals, where he went on to play/coach/manage 16 seasons (as player 1915–18; 1924–25; 1931–32, as coach 1934-38; 1940-46, as manager 1938; 1940), with stints in New York Giants and Chicago Cubs, batting .253 in 1,042 games with 13 home runs and 263 RBI. He appeared in one World Series – 1929 with the Cubs – and was hitless in his only at-bat.

In 1933, he became a coach for the Cardinals' American Association farm club, the Columbus Red Birds, and joined the St. Louis coaching staff in 1934 under manager Frankie Frisch. It was the year of the "Gashouse Gang", the hard-playing Cardinal team that stormed to the NL pennant and a seven-game Fall Classic triumph over the Detroit Tigers.

González coached under Frisch until September 14, 1938, when Frisch was fired. González then took the helm for the final 16 games of the season, leading the Cardinals to an 8–8 record. He resumed his coaching role under Ray Blades the following season, but again became the Cards' interim pilot on June 7, 1940, handling the team until June 10, when Blades' permanent successor, Billy Southworth, arrived from Rochester. Overall, González' big-league managing record was nine wins and 13 defeats (.409).

González continued on the Cardinals' coaching lines through 1946. In the bottom of the eighth inning of his final game, the seventh and deciding contest of the 1946 World Series, Gonzalez was coaching at third base when Enos Slaughter raced home from first base on a double by Harry Walker. "Slaughter's Mad Dash" scored the winning run and earned the Cardinals the world championship. Although films taken of the play appear to show González waving Slaughter in, other accounts report that Slaughter ignored the coach's stop sign and took home on his own initiative.

González is credited with contributing a lasting piece of baseball terminology. Asked by the Giants to scout a winter league player, González judged that the player was outstanding defensively but a liability as a batter. He wired back a four-word scouting report: "Good field, no hit." That phrase is still in use today.

== In Cuban baseball: star player and manager, and club owner ==
González debuted in 1910 as a shortstop for the Fé club. He was a part-time infielder his first three seasons before switching to catcher and gaining a full-time roster spot with Habana in the winter of 1913. He hit .313 in 1918–1919, .296 in 1927–28, and led the league in 1932–33 with an average of .432.

In 1914–15 he became Habana's playing manager and led the team to a championship. It was the first of 13 championships he won at the helm of the team (the others were in 1918–19, 1920–21, 1921–22, 1926–27, 1927–28, 1928–29, 1940–41, 1943–44, 1947–48, 1950–51, 1951–52, and 1952–53). Cuban baseball historian Jorge Figueredo calls his 1927–28 Habana team, which included Jud Wilson, Martín Dihigo, Chino Smith, Alejandro Oms, Ramón Herrera, and Manuel Cueto, "probably the best they ever had in their illustrious history."

== After 1946: 'Ineligible' to return to U.S. organized baseball ==
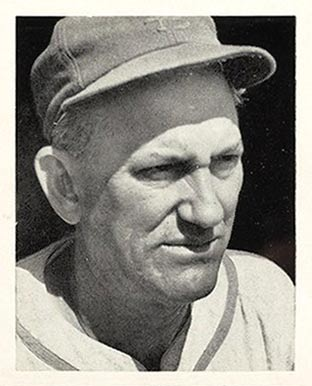
González with the Cardinals

During the 1946 season, the Mexican League, then an insurgent circuit outside the control of "organized baseball", raided Major League teams — notably the Cardinals, Giants and Brooklyn Dodgers — for playing talent, signing Max Lanier, Lou Klein and Fred Martin away from the Cardinals alone. Commissioner of Baseball Happy Chandler responded by banning the "jumping" players for five years, and ruling that any player who competed with or against the jumpers, and any team that employed those banned players, would also lose their professional baseball eligibility.

However, the 1946–47 Cuban Winter League, including González' Habana club, hired some of the banned players in defiance of Chandler's edict, and González resigned from the champion Cardinals' coaching staff to protest the ban. He was simultaneously ruled ineligible from working in U.S. professional baseball. Chandler's ruling was sharply criticized by the Cuban media — while Martin was a star pitcher for Habana in 1946–47. Although Cuban winter league and U.S. baseball officials eventually reached a compromise, and the jumping players were reinstated in 1949, González never returned to the Cardinals or the U.S. Major or minor leagues.

González made a brief fictional appearance in Ernest Hemingway's The Old Man and the Sea, when Hemingway writes "Who is the greatest manager, really, Luque or Mike González?."

González retired as Habana's League manager after the 1952–53 season and in retirement remained in his native country. After the Cuban Revolution brought Fidel Castro to power in 1959, and the ensuing chill in relations between Cuba and the U.S., González was cut off from his old friends and associates in American baseball. He was severely affected by the loss of income after professional baseball was abolished in Cuba in 1961, which forced the dissolution of the Habana Reds. However, he chose to remain in the country, and even made a public appearance at the unveiling of Havana's renovated Gran Stadium (renamed the Estadio Latinoamericano) at the opening of the 1971 Amateur World Series.

He died in Havana at age 86 in 1977.

== See also ==
- List of St. Louis Cardinals coaches • Managers
