= Dolf Luque =

Cuban baseball player (1890–1957)

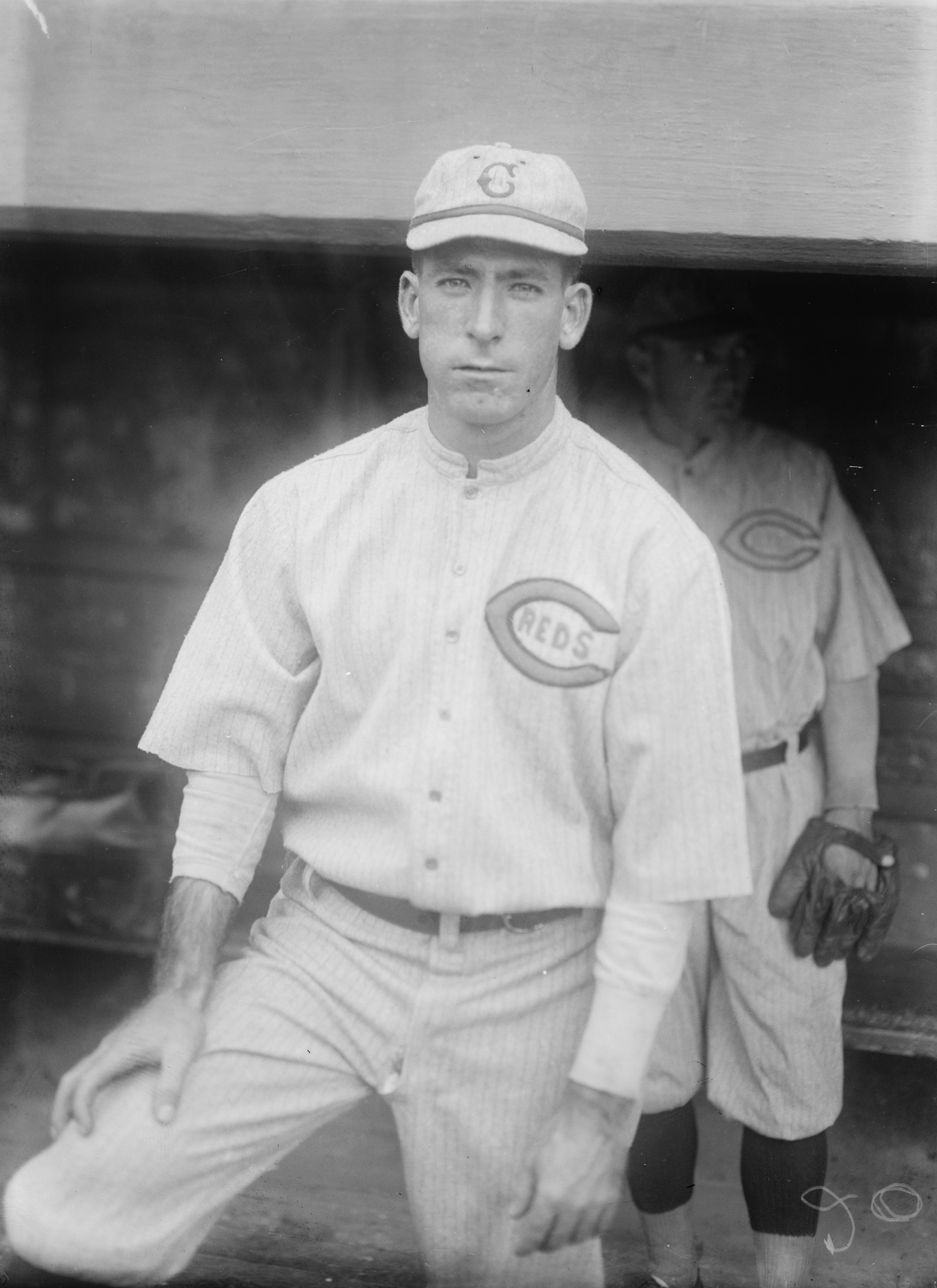
- Pitcher
- Born: August 4, 1890; Havana, Cuba
- Died: July 3, 1957 (aged 66); Havana, Cuba
- Batted: Right Threw: Right

MLB debut
- May 20, 1914, for the Boston Braves

Last MLB appearance
- April 26, 1935, for the New York Giants

MLB statistics
- Win–loss record: 194–179
- Earned run average: 3.24
- Strikeouts: 1,130
- Stats at Baseball Reference

Teams
- Boston Braves (1914–1915); Cincinnati Reds (1918–1929); Brooklyn Robins (1930–1931); New York Giants (1932–1935)

Career highlights and awards
- 2× World Series champion (1919, 1933); MLB wins leader (1923); 2× MLB ERA leader (1923, 1925); Cincinnati Reds Hall of Fame

Member of the Cuban

Baseball Hall of Fame
- Induction: 1957

Adolfo Domingo De Guzmán Luque (August 4, 1890 – July 3, 1957) was a Cuban starting pitcher in Major League Baseball (MLB) from 1914 to 1935. He spent 12 seasons of his career (1918–1929) with the Cincinnati Reds. Luque was not only the first Latin American pitcher in MLB, but also the first to earn a World Series win (in 1919), and the first to lead the majors in wins, shutouts and earned run average (ERA).

A native of Havana, Luque played winter baseball in the Cuban League from 1912 to 1945 and was also a long-time manager in the league, leading Almendares to eight championships over 19 seasons. Along with his contemporary Miguel Ángel González, he is considered one of the best Cuban baseball managers of all time. Additionally, he managed in the Mexican League in all or parts of eight seasons spanning 1946–1956.

Luque was enshrined in the Cuban Baseball Hall of Fame in 1957 and the Cincinnati Reds Hall of Fame in 1967, as well as in the Mexican Baseball Hall of Fame in 1985.

== Playing career ==
Luque made his professional debut in Cuba for the Habana baseball club against a Major League opponent, the Philadelphia Phillies, in an exhibition series in the fall of 1911. He left the game after 8 innings with his team ahead 6–5, but his reliever failed to hold the lead and left Luque with a no decision. He then pitched against the New York Giants, going 1–2, getting the only win for Habana in six games. He debuted in the Cuban League in the winter of 1912, but went 0–4, 0–2, and 2–4 his first three seasons. In 1914/15 he moved to Almendares and had his first winning season, going 7–4. The following season he led the league in wins with a 12–5 record. The next winter, 1917, he tied for the league lead in wins and also led in hitting with a .355 average.

Luque made his major league debut with the Boston Braves in 1914. In 1918, he was traded to the Cincinnati Reds, with whom he played the next 12 seasons. In the notorious 1919 World Series, he appeared in two games as a relief pitcher. Luque also played for the Brooklyn Robins/Dodgers from 1930 to 1931 and with the New York Giants from 1932 to 1935. He was with the Giants in the 1933 World Series, and, pitching in relief, won the fifth and final game over the Washington Senators, thus becoming (at age 43) the oldest pitcher ever to win a World Series game. He ended his career with a record of 194–179 and a 3.24 ERA.

Luque was an above average hitting pitcher in his major league career, posting a .227 batting average (237-for-1043) with 96 runs, 5 home runs and 90 RBI. He also drew 70 bases on balls.

Luque became a starting pitcher in 1920. Primarily pitching with a curveball, he led the National League in losses in 1922, then had his best year in 1923, leading the league with 27 wins and an ERA of 1.93. Luque also led the NL in ERA with a 2.63 in 1925. He was known as an adept mentor in the later years of his pitching career, and went on to become the pitching coach of the Giants from 1936 to 1938 and 1942 to 45.

As a blue-eyed, fair-skinned, white Cuban, he was one of several white Cubans to make it in Major League Baseball at a time when non-whites were excluded. Between 1911 and 1929 alone, seventeen Cuban-born Caucasian players played in the Major Leagues. Many of them, including Luque, also played Negro league baseball with integrated teams from Cuba. Luque played for Cuban Stars in 1912 and the Long Branch Cubans in 1913 before signing with organized baseball.

Luque was known to have a temper. While with the Brooklyn Dodgers, a heckler in the stands hollered "Lucky Luque! Lucky Luque!" repeatedly. Luque went over to the dugout and told manager Wilbert Robinson, "I tell you, Robbie, if this guy don't shut up, I'm gonna shut him up." "Aw, come on, Dolf", said the manager. "He paid his way in—let him boo." Just then the heckler spotted the rotund Robinson and yelled, "Hey, fat belly!" Robinson said, "OK, Dolf—go ahead and clobber the jerk." Luque obliged his manager's request.

Luque also served as a coach at the major league level for seven seasons (1936–1937; 1941–1945) with the New York Giants, working under managers Bill Terry and Mel Ott. As a coach, Luque was a member of the Giants' 1936 and 1937 National League champion teams.

== Managerial career ==
Luque managed in the Mexican League for the Pericos de Puebla (1946–1947), Azules de Veracruz (1948), Tecolotes de Nuevo Laredo (1953–1955) and Leones de Yucatán (1956). Besides, he managed the 1951 Habana Cubans of the Florida International League sandwiched between two stints with the Águilas de Mexicali in 1950 (Sunset League) and 1952 (Southwest International League).

=== Cuba ===
Luque was the only manager to head each of the “big four” teams in the Cuban League; though the bulk of his career was spent with Almendares, he also managed Habana for three seasons (1924, 1955, 1956) and spent one season with Cienfuegos (which he led to a title in 1946) and Marianao.

In 1919/20 Luque became a playing manager for Almendares and led the team to a championship in his first season at the helm, the first of seven championships as a manager. He contributed on the pitching mound with a 10–4 record, leading the league in wins. In 1922/23 he moved to Habana (where Miguel Angel González was manager) and again led the league in wins with an 11–9 record. The next season, he took over the helm as Habana's manager and went 7–2 as a pitcher. Later in the decade, Luque's Major League team, the Cincinnati Reds, did not allow him to play winter baseball in Cuba. Luque sometimes evaded the ban by playing under assumed names.

By the 1930s, Luque had returned to Almendares as manager. He generally pitched only occasionally, though in 1934/35 he contributed as a pitcher to his second championship as a manager; he tied for the league lead in wins with a 6–2 record and led the league with a 1.27 ERA. As manager, he again led Almendares to championships in 1939/40, 1941/42, and 1942/43, led Cienfuegos to a championship in 1945/46, and returned to Almendares for his final championship in 1946/47. He continued to manage for various teams until 1955/56.

Luque's career Cuban League pitching record was 106–71. Luque is the all-time Cuban League leader in years pitching with 22, ranking second behind Martín Dihigo in wins with 106, and seventh in winning percentage with .599.

== Legacy ==
Luque is mentioned in Ernest Hemingway's 1952 novel The Old Man and the Sea, when Hemingway writes "Who is the greatest manager, really, Luque or Mike Gonzalez?."

Luque died July 3, 1957, and is buried at Colon Cemetery, Havana.

== See also ==
- List of Cubans
- List of Major League Baseball players from Cuba
- List of Major League Baseball annual ERA leaders

== Sources ==
- Figueredo, Jorge S. (2003), Cuban Baseball: A Statistical History, 1878–1961, Jefferson, North Carolina: McFarland & Company, ISBN 0-7864-1250-X.
- Riley, James A. (2002). The Biographical Encyclopedia of the Negro Baseball Leagues. 2nd ed.. New York: Carroll & Graf Publ. ISBN 0-7867-0959-6.
