= 1933 Boston Red Sox season =

Major League Baseball season

1933 Boston Red Sox
- League: American League
- Ballpark: Fenway Park
- City: Boston, Massachusetts
- Record: 63–86 (.423)
- League place: 7th
- Owners: Tom Yawkey
- President: Tom Yawkey
- General managers: Eddie Collins
- Managers: Marty McManus
- Radio: WNAC (Fred Hoey)
- Stats: ESPN.com; Baseball Reference

The 1933 Boston Red Sox season was the 33rd season in the franchise's Major League Baseball history. The Red Sox finished seventh in the American League (AL) with a record of 63 wins and 86 losses, 34 1/2 games behind the Washington Senators.

On February 25, 1933, Tom Yawkey bought the Red Sox for $1.25 million from J. A. Robert Quinn, and persuaded friend and former Philadelphia Athletics second baseman Eddie Collins to be the team's vice president and general manager.

There were five rainouts during the season, one game against the Senators and a four-game series against the Chicago White Sox that was cancelled due to the remnants of the 1933 Outer Banks hurricane, which passed to the southeast of New England during the third weekend of September.

== Regular season ==
=== Season Overview ===
In a May meeting of the American League owners, Tom Yawkey reached an agreement with St. Louis Browns owner Phil Ball for the catcher Rick Ferrell and the pitcher Lloyd Brown. Yawkey also paid $100,000 for pitcher George Pipgras and infielder Billy Werber from the New York Yankees.

=== Season standings ===
American League
Team	W	L	Pct.	GB	Home	Road
Washington Senators	99	53	.651	—	46‍–‍30	53‍–‍23
New York Yankees	91	59	.607	7	51‍–‍23	40‍–‍36
Philadelphia Athletics	79	72	.523	19½	46‍–‍29	33‍–‍43
Cleveland Indians	75	76	.497	23½	45‍–‍32	30‍–‍44
Detroit Tigers	75	79	.487	25	43‍–‍35	32‍–‍44
Chicago White Sox	67	83	.447	31	35‍–‍41	32‍–‍42
Boston Red Sox	63	86	.423	34½	32‍–‍40	31‍–‍46
St. Louis Browns	55	96	.364	43½	30‍–‍46	25‍–‍50

=== Record vs. opponents ===
1933 American League record Sources:
Team	BOS	CWS	CLE	DET	NYY	PHA	SLB	WSH
Boston	—	11–7	6–16	11–11	8–14	14–8	9–13	4–17
Chicago	7–11	—	9–13	10–12	7–15–1	12–10	15–7	7–15
Cleveland	16–6	13–9	—	10–12	7–13	6–16	15–7	8–13
Detroit	11–11	12–10	12–10	—	7–15	11–11	14–8–1	8–14
New York	14–8	15–7–1	13–7	15–7	—	12–9	14–7–1	8–14
Philadelphia	8–14	10–12	16–6	11–11	9–12	—	14–6	11–11–1
St. Louis	13–9	7–15	7–15	8–14–1	7–14–1	6–14	—	7–15
Washington	17–4	15–7	13–8	14–8	14–8	11–11–1	15–7	—

=== Opening Day lineup ===
1	Rabbit Warstler	SS
2	Marty McManus	3B
7	Johnny Watwood	CF
15	Dale Alexander	1B
4	Smead Jolley	LF
5	Johnny Hodapp	2B
3	Roy Johnson	RF
9	Merv Shea	C
16	Ivy Andrews	P

=== Roster ===
1933 Boston Red Sox
Roster
Pitchers: 16 Ivy Andrews; 26 Lloyd Brown; 14 Curt Fullerton; 18 Hank Johnson; 24 Bob Kline; 21 Jud McLaughlin; 23 Mike Meola; 11 George Pipgras; 17 Gordon Rhodes; 19 Bob Weiland; 20 Johnny Welch	Catchers: 9 Rick Ferrell; 8 Johnny Gooch; 21 Lou Legett; 9 Merv Shea; Infielders: 15 Dale Alexander; 6 Bernie Friberg; 5 Johnny Hodapp; 23 Joe Judge; 2 Marty McManus; 23 Freddie Muller; 14 Marv Olson; 10 Bob Seeds; 6 Bucky Walters; 1 Rabbit Warstler; 22 Billy Werber	Outfielders: 21 Mel Almada; 7 Dusty Cooke; 13 Bob Fothergill; 3 Roy Johnson; 4 Smead Jolley; 12 Tom Oliver; 25 George Stumpf; 7 Johnny Watwood; 11 Tom Winsett; Pinch hitter: 26 Greg Mulleavy	Manager: 2 Marty McManus; Coaches: 30 Tom Daly; 31 Rudy Hulswitt

== Player stats ==
=== Batting ===
==== Starters by position ====
Note: Pos = Position; G = Games played; AB = At bats; H = Hits; Avg. = Batting average; HR = Home runs; RBI = Runs batted in

Pos	Player	G	AB	H	Avg.	HR	RBI
C	Rick Ferrell	118	421	125	.297	3	72
1B	Dale Alexander	94	313	88	.281	5	40
2B	Johnny Hodapp	115	413	129	.312	3	54
SS	Rabbit Warstler	92	322	70	.217	1	17
3B	Marty McManus	106	366	104	.284	3	36
OF	Smead Jolley	118	411	116	.282	9	65
OF	Roy Johnson	133	483	151	.313	10	95
OF	Dusty Cooke	119	454	133	.293	5	54

==== Other batters ====
Note: G = Games played; AB = At bats; H = Hits; Avg. = Batting average; HR = Home runs; RBI = Runs batted in

Player	G	AB	H	Avg.	HR	RBI
Billy Werber	108	425	110	.259	3	39
Tom Oliver	90	244	63	.258	0	23
Bob Seeds	82	230	56	.243	0	23
Bucky Walters	52	195	50	.256	4	28
Joe Judge	35	108	32	.296	0	22
Johnny Gooch	37	77	14	.182	0	2
Merv Shea	16	56	8	.143	0	8
Freddie Muller	15	48	9	.188	0	3
Mel Almada	14	44	15	.341	1	3
Bernie Friberg	17	41	13	.317	0	9
George Stumpf	22	41	14	.341	0	5
Bob Fothergill	28	32	11	.344	0	5
Johnny Watwood	13	30	4	.133	0	2
Tom Winsett	6	12	1	.083	0	0
Lou Legett	8	5	1	.200	0	1
Marv Olson	3	1	0	.000	0	0
Greg Mulleavy	1	0	0	----	0	0

=== Pitching ===
==== Starting pitchers ====
Note: G = Games pitched; IP = Innings pitched; W = Wins; L = Losses; ERA = Earned run average; SO = Strikeouts

Player	G	IP	W	L	ERA	SO
Gordon Rhodes	34	232.0	12	15	4.03	85
Bob Weiland	39	216.1	8	14	3.87	97
Hank Johnson	25	155.1	8	6	4.06	65
George Pipgras	22	128.1	9	8	4.07	56

==== Other pitchers ====
Note: G = Games pitched; IP = Innings pitched; W = Wins; L = Losses; ERA = Earned run average; SO = Strikeouts

Player	G	IP	W	L	ERA	SO
Lloyd Brown	33	163.1	8	11	4.02	37
Ivy Andrews	34	140.0	7	14	4.95	37
Johnny Welch	47	129.0	4	9	4.60	68
Bob Kline	46	127.0	7	8	4.54	16
Curt Fullerton	6	25.1	0	2	8.53	10

==== Relief pitchers ====
Note: G = Games pitched; W = Wins; L = Losses; SV = Saves; ERA = Earned run average; SO = Strikeouts

Player	G	W	L	SV	ERA	SO
Jud McLaughlin	6	0	0	0	6.23	1
Mike Meola	3	0	0	0	23.14	1

== Farm system ==
Level	Team	League	Manager
A	Reading Red Sox	New York–Pennsylvania League	Nemo Leibold
