= 1933 St. Louis Browns season =

Major League Baseball season

1933 St. Louis Browns
- League: American League
- Ballpark: Sportsman's Park
- City: St. Louis, Missouri
- Record: 55–96 (.364)
- League place: 8th
- Owners: Phil Ball
- Managers: Bill Killefer, Allen Sothoron, and Rogers Hornsby
- Radio: KMOX, KWK (France Laux)

The 1933 St. Louis Browns season involved the Browns finishing 8th in the American League with a record of 55 wins and 96 losses, 43½ games behind the AL Champion Washington Senators.

== Regular season ==
=== Season standings ===
American League
Team	W	L	Pct.	GB	Home	Road
Washington Senators	99	53	.651	—	46‍–‍30	53‍–‍23
New York Yankees	91	59	.607	7	51‍–‍23	40‍–‍36
Philadelphia Athletics	79	72	.523	19½	46‍–‍29	33‍–‍43
Cleveland Indians	75	76	.497	23½	45‍–‍32	30‍–‍44
Detroit Tigers	75	79	.487	25	43‍–‍35	32‍–‍44
Chicago White Sox	67	83	.447	31	35‍–‍41	32‍–‍42
Boston Red Sox	63	86	.423	34½	32‍–‍40	31‍–‍46
St. Louis Browns	55	96	.364	43½	30‍–‍46	25‍–‍50

=== Record vs. opponents ===
1933 American League record Sources:
Team	BOS	CWS	CLE	DET	NYY	PHA	SLB	WSH
Boston	—	11–7	6–16	11–11	8–14	14–8	9–13	4–17
Chicago	7–11	—	9–13	10–12	7–15–1	12–10	15–7	7–15
Cleveland	16–6	13–9	—	10–12	7–13	6–16	15–7	8–13
Detroit	11–11	12–10	12–10	—	7–15	11–11	14–8–1	8–14
New York	14–8	15–7–1	13–7	15–7	—	12–9	14–7–1	8–14
Philadelphia	8–14	10–12	16–6	11–11	9–12	—	14–6	11–11–1
St. Louis	13–9	7–15	7–15	8–14–1	7–14–1	6–14	—	7–15
Washington	17–4	15–7	13–8	14–8	14–8	11–11–1	15–7	—

=== Notable transactions ===
- July 26, 1933: Rogers Hornsby was signed as a free agent by the Browns.

=== Roster ===
1933 St. Louis Browns
Roster
Pitchers: 12 George Blaeholder; -- Garland Braxton; 14 Lloyd Brown; 16 Dick Coffman; 15 Sam Gray; 17 Bump Hadley; 19 Wally Hebert; 18 Jack Knott; 30 Hank McDonald; 22 Rollie Stiles; 28 Ed Wells	Catchers: 25 Jack Crouch; 8 Rick Ferrell; -- Rollie Hemsley; 9 Muddy Ruel; 8 Merv Shea; Infielders: 2 Jack Burns; 1 Jim Levey; 5 Ski Melillo; 7 Art Scharein; 24 Lin Storti	Outfielders: 4 Bruce Campbell; 27 Debs Garms; 26 Ted Gullic; 3 Carl Reynolds; 6 Sam West; Other batters: 16 Rogers Hornsby	Manager: 16 Rogers Hornsby; 33 Bill Killefer; 29 Allen Sothoron; Coaches: 29 Allen Sothoron

== Player stats ==
=== Batting ===
==== Starters by position ====
Note: Pos = Position; G = Games played; AB = At bats; H = Hits; Avg. = Batting average; HR = Home runs; RBI = Runs batted in

Pos	Player	G	AB	H	Avg.	HR	RBI
C	Merv Shea	94	279	73	.262	1	27
1B	Jack Burns	144	556	160	.288	7	71
2B	Ski Melillo	132	496	145	.292	3	79
SS	Jim Levey	141	529	103	.195	2	36
3B	Art Scharein	123	471	96	.204	0	26
OF	Carl Reynolds	135	475	136	.286	8	71
OF	Bruce Campbell	148	567	157	.277	16	106
OF	Sam West	133	517	155	.300	11	48

==== Other batters ====
Note: G = Games played; AB = At bats; H = Hits; Avg. = Batting average; HR = Home runs; RBI = Runs batted in

Player	G	AB	H	Avg.	HR	RBI
Ted Gullic	104	304	74	.243	5	35
Lin Storti	70	210	41	.195	3	21
Debs Garms	78	189	60	.317	4	24
Rollie Hemsley	32	95	23	.242	1	15
Rick Ferrell	22	72	18	.250	1	5
Muddy Ruel	36	63	12	.190	0	8
Jack Crouch	19	30	5	.167	1	5
Rogers Hornsby	11	9	3	.333	1	2

=== Pitching ===
==== Starting pitchers ====
Note: G = Games pitched; IP = Innings pitched; W = Wins; L = Losses; ERA = Earned run average; SO = Strikeouts

Player	G	IP	W	L	ERA	SO
Bump Hadley	45	316.2	15	20	3.92	149
George Blaeholder	38	255.2	15	19	4.72	63
Ed Wells	36	203.2	6	14	4.20	58
Lloyd Brown	8	39.0	1	6	7.15	7

==== Other pitchers ====
Note: G = Games pitched; IP = Innings pitched; W = Wins; L = Losses; ERA = Earned run average; SO = Strikeouts

Player	G	IP	W	L	ERA	SO
Rollie Stiles	31	115.0	3	7	5.01	29
Wally Hebert	33	88.1	4	6	5.30	19
Jack Knott	20	82.2	1	8	5.01	19
Dick Coffman	21	81.0	3	7	5.89	19
Garland Braxton	5	8.1	0	1	9.72	5

==== Relief pitchers ====
Note: G = Games pitched; W = Wins; L = Losses; SV = Saves; ERA = Earned run average; SO = Strikeouts

Player	G	W	L	SV	ERA	SO
Sam Gray	38	7	4	4	4.10	36
Hank McDonald	25	0	4	0	8.64	22

== Farm system ==
Level	Team	League	Manager
A	San Antonio Missions	Texas League	Hank Severeid
A	Joplin Miners	Western League	Runt Marr

LEAGUE CHAMPIONS: San Antonio
