= 1933 Detroit Tigers season =

Major League Baseball season

1933 Detroit Tigers
- League: American League
- Ballpark: Navin Field
- City: Detroit, Michigan
- Record: 75–79 (.487)
- League place: 5th
- Owners: Frank Navin
- Managers: Bucky Harris, Del Baker
- Radio: WWJ (AM) (Ty Tyson)

The 1933 Detroit Tigers season was the team's 33rd season representing Detroit, Michigan, in Major League Baseball. In their fifth and final season under manager Bucky Harris, the Tigers compiled a 75–79 record and finished in fifth place in the American League, 25 games behind the Washington Senators.

The team's key players included:

- Second baseman Charlie Gehringer, inducted into the Baseball Hall of Fame in 1949, appeared in all 155 games and led the team in batting average (.325), on-base percentage (.393), hits (204), runs (104), doubles (42), and RBIs (108). He was selected to the 1933 American League All-Star team and finished sixth in the voting for the American League MVP award. He also led the American League's second basemen in assists (542) and double plays (111) and ranked second in putouts (358).
- Rookie first baseman Hank Greenberg, inducted into the Hall of Fame in 1956, finished second on the club in batting average (.301) and tied with Gehringer in home runs (12) and slugging percentage (.468).
- Shortstop Billy Rogell appeared in all 155 games, led the team in walks (79), tied with Gehringer for the lead in doubles (42), and ranked second in on-base percentage (.381) and hits (173).
- Outfielder Gee Walker led the team in stolen bases (25).
- Outfielder Pete Fox led the team in triples (13).
- Pitcher Tommy Bridges led the team in earned run average (3.09) and strikeouts (120).
- Pitcher Firpo Marberry led the team in wins (16) and innings pitched (238-1/3).
- Rookie pitcher Schoolboy Rowe led the team in winning percentage (7–4, .593) despite having his season cut short by a shoulder injury in July.

The team was owned by Frank Navin and played its home games at Navin Field.

== Regular season ==
=== Season standings ===
American League
Team	W	L	Pct.	GB	Home	Road
Washington Senators	99	53	.651	—	46‍–‍30	53‍–‍23
New York Yankees	91	59	.607	7	51‍–‍23	40‍–‍36
Philadelphia Athletics	79	72	.523	19½	46‍–‍29	33‍–‍43
Cleveland Indians	75	76	.497	23½	45‍–‍32	30‍–‍44
Detroit Tigers	75	79	.487	25	43‍–‍35	32‍–‍44
Chicago White Sox	67	83	.447	31	35‍–‍41	32‍–‍42
Boston Red Sox	63	86	.423	34½	32‍–‍40	31‍–‍46
St. Louis Browns	55	96	.364	43½	30‍–‍46	25‍–‍50

=== Record vs. opponents ===
1933 American League record Sources:
Team	BOS	CWS	CLE	DET	NYY	PHA	SLB	WSH
Boston	—	11–7	6–16	11–11	8–14	14–8	9–13	4–17
Chicago	7–11	—	9–13	10–12	7–15–1	12–10	15–7	7–15
Cleveland	16–6	13–9	—	10–12	7–13	6–16	15–7	8–13
Detroit	11–11	12–10	12–10	—	7–15	11–11	14–8–1	8–14
New York	14–8	15–7–1	13–7	15–7	—	12–9	14–7–1	8–14
Philadelphia	8–14	10–12	16–6	11–11	9–12	—	14–6	11–11–1
St. Louis	13–9	7–15	7–15	8–14–1	7–14–1	6–14	—	7–15
Washington	17–4	15–7	13–8	14–8	14–8	11–11–1	15–7	—

=== Roster ===
1933 Detroit Tigers
Roster
Pitchers: 14 Elden Auker; 16 Tommy Bridges; 22 Carl Fischer; 12 Vic Frazier; 20 Luke Hamlin; 18 Art Herring; 17 Elon Hogsett; -- Roxie Lawson; 19 Firpo Marberry; 8 Bots Nekola; 24 Schoolboy Rowe; 11 Vic Sorrell; 14 George Uhle; 12 Whit Wyatt	Catchers: 25 Gene Desautels; 23 Ray Hayworth; 5 Johnny Pasek; 9 Frank Reiber; Infielders: 26 Harry Davis; 2 Charlie Gehringer; 7 Hank Greenberg; 15 Marv Owen; 6 Billy Rogell; 33 Heinie Schuble	Outfielders: 9 Frank Doljack; 1 Pete Fox; 5 Billy Rhiel; 3 John Stone; 27 Gee Walker; 4 Earl Webb; 28 Jo-Jo White	Manager: 31 Del Baker; 32 Bucky Harris; Coaches: 31 Del Baker

== Player stats ==
=== Batting ===
==== Starters by position ====
Note: Pos = Position; G = Games played; AB = At bats; H = Hits; Avg. = Batting average; HR = Home runs; RBI = Runs batted in

Pos	Player	G	AB	H	Avg.	HR	RBI
C	Ray Hayworth	134	425	104	.245	1	45
1B	Hank Greenberg	117	449	135	.301	12	85
2B	Charlie Gehringer	155	628	204	.325	12	108
SS	Billy Rogell	155	587	173	.295	0	57
3B	Marv Owen	138	550	144	.262	2	64
OF	Gee Walker	127	483	135	.280	9	63
OF	John Stone	148	574	161	.280	11	80
OF	Pete Fox	128	535	154	.288	7	58

==== Other batters ====
Note: G = Games played; AB = At bats; H = Hits; Avg. = Batting average; HR = Home runs; RBI = Runs batted in

Player	G	AB	H	Avg.	HR	RBI
Jo-Jo White	91	234	59	.252	2	35
Harry Davis	66	173	37	.214	0	14
Frank Doljack	42	147	42	.286	0	22
Heinie Schuble	49	96	21	.219	0	5
Johnny Pasek	28	61	15	.246	0	5
Gene Desautels	30	42	6	.143	0	4
Frank Reiber	13	18	5	.278	1	3
Billy Rhiel	19	17	3	.176	0	1
Earl Webb	6	11	3	.273	0	3

=== Pitching ===
==== Starting pitchers ====
Note: G = Games pitched; IP = Innings pitched; W = Wins; L = Losses; ERA = Earned run average; SO = Strikeouts

Player	G	IP	W	L	ERA	SO
Firpo Marberry	37	238.1	16	11	3.29	84
Tommy Bridges	33	233.0	14	12	3.09	120
Vic Sorrell	36	232.2	11	15	3.79	75
Schoolboy Rowe	19	123.1	7	4	3.58	75
Vic Frazier	20	104.1	5	5	6.64	26
Luke Hamlin	3	16.2	1	0	4.86	10

==== Other pitchers ====
Note: G = Games pitched; IP = Innings pitched; W = Wins; L = Losses; ERA = Earned run average; SO = Strikeouts

Player	G	IP	W	L	ERA	SO
Carl Fischer	35	182.2	11	15	3.55	93
Elden Auker	15	55.0	3	3	5.24	17
Roxie Lawson	4	16.0	0	1	7.31	6

==== Relief pitchers ====
Note: G = Games pitched; W = Wins; L = Losses; SV = Saves; ERA = Earned run average; SO = Strikeouts

Player	G	W	L	SV	ERA	SO
Elon Hogsett	45	6	10	9	4.50	39
Art Herring	24	1	2	0	3.84	20
Whit Wyatt	10	0	1	0	4.24	9
Bots Nekola	2	0	0	0	27.00	0
George Uhle	1	0	0	0	27.00	1

== Farm system ==
Level	Team	League	Manager
AA	Toronto Maple Leafs	International League	Dan Howley
A	Beaumont Exporters	Texas League	Bob Coleman
A	Hutchinson Wheat Shockers/Bartlesville Broncs	Western League	Marty Purtell
B	Quincy Shipbuilders/Nashua Millionaires/Brockton Shoemakers	New England League	Hal Weafer, Billy Flynn and Paul Wolff
C	Shreveport Sports	Dixie League	Dutch Lorbeer and Gus Whelan
C	Huntington Boosters	Middle Atlantic League	Johnny Stuart, Earl Smith, Bernie Neis and Rube Benton

Hutchinson franchise transferred to Bartlesville and renamed, July 7, 1933; Quincy franchise moved and renamed twice, to Nashua on June 6, 1933, and to Brockton, August 8
