= 1933 Washington Senators season =

1933 Washington Senators
- American League champions
- League: American League
- Ballpark: Griffith Stadium
- City: Washington, D.C.
- Record: 99–53 (.651)
- League place: 1st
- Owners: Clark Griffith and William Richardson
- Managers: Joe Cronin

The 1933 Washington Senators was a season in American baseball. They won 99 games, lost 53, and finished in first place in the American League. It was the third and final pennant of the franchise while based in Washington. The team was managed by Joe Cronin and played home games at Griffith Stadium. They lost the best-of-seven World Series in 5 games to the New York Giants.

It would be the last time a Major League Baseball postseason series would be held in Washington until the 2012 season. The Senators franchise, which moved to Minneapolis–St. Paul after the 1960 season, has since won three American League pennants (1965; 1987; 1991) and two World Series (1987 and 1991) as the Minnesota Twins. The Series also marked the last time the nation's capital hosted a World Series game until the Washington Nationals -- spiritual successors to the Senators -- played in and ultimately won the 2019 World Series over the Houston Astros in seven games.

== Regular season ==
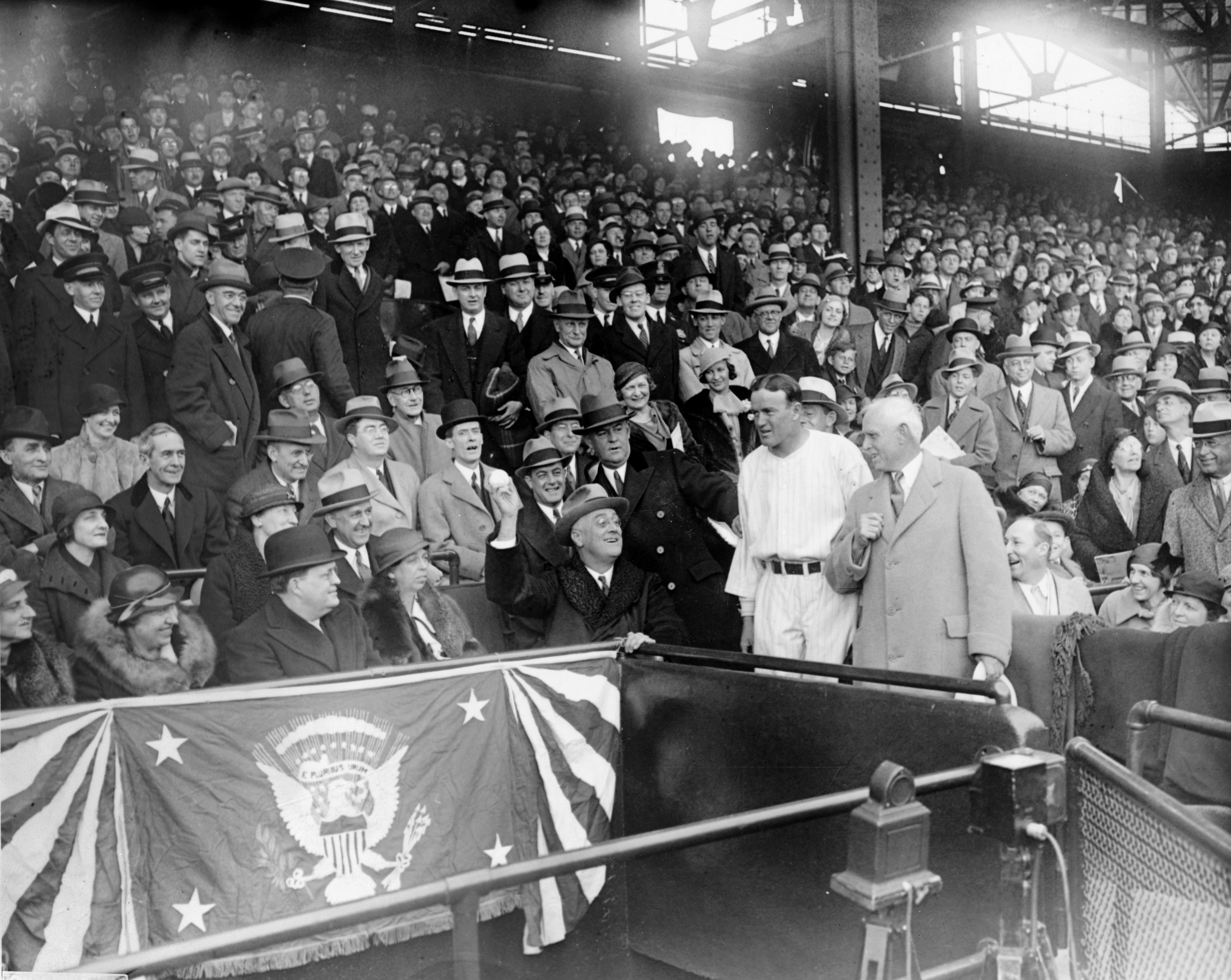
President Franklin D. Roosevelt throwing the ceremonial first pitch on Opening Day at Griffith Stadium.

Player-manager Cronin was selected to the All-Star team as the starting shortstop and finished second in MVP voting. He also led the Senators with 118 runs batted in. 19-year-old infielder Cecil Travis had five hits in his major league debut.

=== Season standings ===
American League
Team	W	L	Pct.	GB	Home	Road
Washington Senators	99	53	.651	—	46‍–‍30	53‍–‍23
New York Yankees	91	59	.607	7	51‍–‍23	40‍–‍36
Philadelphia Athletics	79	72	.523	19½	46‍–‍29	33‍–‍43
Cleveland Indians	75	76	.497	23½	45‍–‍32	30‍–‍44
Detroit Tigers	75	79	.487	25	43‍–‍35	32‍–‍44
Chicago White Sox	67	83	.447	31	35‍–‍41	32‍–‍42
Boston Red Sox	63	86	.423	34½	32‍–‍40	31‍–‍46
St. Louis Browns	55	96	.364	43½	30‍–‍46	25‍–‍50

=== Record vs. opponents ===
1933 American League record Sources:
Team	BOS	CWS	CLE	DET	NYY	PHA	SLB	WSH
Boston	—	11–7	6–16	11–11	8–14	14–8	9–13	4–17
Chicago	7–11	—	9–13	10–12	7–15–1	12–10	15–7	7–15
Cleveland	16–6	13–9	—	10–12	7–13	6–16	15–7	8–13
Detroit	11–11	12–10	12–10	—	7–15	11–11	14–8–1	8–14
New York	14–8	15–7–1	13–7	15–7	—	12–9	14–7–1	8–14
Philadelphia	8–14	10–12	16–6	11–11	9–12	—	14–6	11–11–1
St. Louis	13–9	7–15	7–15	8–14–1	7–14–1	6–14	—	7–15
Washington	17–4	15–7	13–8	14–8	14–8	11–11–1	15–7	—

=== Roster ===
1933 Washington Senators
Roster
Pitchers: 18 Bobby Burke; 26 John Campbell; 19 Ed Chapman; 12 Alvin Crowder; 20 Ed Linke; 19 Bill McAfee; 26 Alex McColl; 30 Ray Prim; 17 Jack Russell; 14 Lefty Stewart; 21 Bud Thomas; 15 Tommy Thomas; 16 Monte Weaver; 11 Earl Whitehill	Catchers: 10 Moe Berg; 9 Cliff Bolton; 8 Luke Sewell; Infielders: 7 Ossie Bluege; 25 Bob Boken; 4 Joe Cronin; 23 John Kerr; 2 Joe Kuhel; 1 Buddy Myer; 26,31 Cecil Travis	Outfielders: 5 Goose Goslin; 24 Dave Harris; 3 Heinie Manush; 22 Sam Rice; 6 Fred Schulte; Other batters: 27 Nick Altrock	Manager: 4 Joe Cronin; Coaches: 27 Nick Altrock; 28 Al Schacht

== Player stats ==
= Indicates team leader

= Indicates league leader

=== Batting ===
==== Starters by position ====
Note: Pos = Position; G = Games played; AB = At bats; H = Hits; Avg. = Batting average; HR = Home runs; RBI = Runs batted in

Pos	Player	G	AB	H	Avg.	HR	RBI
C	Luke Sewell	141	474	125	.264	2	61
1B	Joe Kuhel	153	602	194	.322	11	107
2B	Buddy Myer	131	530	160	.302	4	61
3B	Ossie Bluege	140	501	131	.261	6	71
SS	Joe Cronin	152	602	186	.309	5	118
LF	Heinie Manush	153	658	221	.336	5	95
CF	Fred Schulte	144	550	162	.295	5	87
RF	Goose Goslin	132	549	163	.297	10	64

==== Other batters ====
Note: G = Games played; AB = At bats; H = Hits; Avg. = Batting average; HR = Home runs; RBI = Runs batted in

Player	G	AB	H	Avg.	HR	RBI
Dave Harris	82	177	46	.260	5	38
Bob Boken	55	133	37	.278	3	26
Sam Rice	73	85	25	.294	1	12
Moe Berg	40	65	12	.185	2	9
Cecil Travis	18	43	13	.302	0	2
John Kerr	28	40	8	.200	0	0
Cliff Bolton	33	39	16	.410	0	6
Nick Altrock	1	1	0	.000	0	0

=== Pitching ===
==== Starting pitchers ====
Note: G = Games pitched; IP = Innings pitched; W = Wins; L = Losses; ERA = Earned run average; SO = Strikeouts

Player	G	IP	W	L	ERA	SO
Alvin Crowder	52	299.1	24	15	3.97	110
Earl Whitehill	39	270.0	22	8	3.33	96
Lefty Stewart	34	230.2	15	6	3.82	69
Monte Weaver	23	152.1	10	5	3.25	45

==== Other pitchers ====
Note: G = Games pitched; IP = Innings pitched; W = Wins; L = Losses; ERA = Earned run average; SO = Strikeouts

Player	G	IP	W	L	ERA	SO
Bobby Burke	25	64.0	4	3	3.23	28
Alex McColl	4	17.0	1	0	2.65	5
Ed Linke	3	16.0	1	0	5.06	6
Ray Prim	2	16.0	0	1	3.14	6
Ed Chapman	6	9.0	0	0	8.00	4

==== Relief pitchers ====
Note: G = Games pitched; W = Wins; L = Losses; SV = Saves; ERA = Earned run average; SO = Strikeouts

Player	G	W	L	SV	ERA	SO
Jack Russell	50	12	6	13	2.69	28
Tommy Thomas	35	7	7	3	4.80	35
Bill McAfee	27	3	2	5	6.62	14
Bud Thomas	2	0	0	0	15.75	1
John Campbell	1	0	0	0	0.00	0

== Awards and honors ==
=== All-Stars ===
Joe Cronin, starter, shortstop Alvin Crowder, reserve, pitcher

=== League top five finishers ===
Joe Cronin

- #4 in AL in RBI (118)

Alvin Crowder

- MLB leader in wins (24)

Joe Kuhel

- #4 in AL in stolen bases (17)

Heinie Manush

- #2 in AL in batting average (.336)
- #3 in AL in runs scored (115)

Earl Whitehill

- #3 in AL in wins (22)

== 1933 World Series ==
=== Game 1 ===
October 3, 1933, at the Polo Grounds in New York City

Team	1	2	3	4	5	6	7	8	9	R	H	E
Washington (A)	0	0	0	1	0	0	0	0	1	2	5	3
New York (N)	2	0	2	0	0	0	0	0	x	4	10	2
W: Carl Hubbell (1–0) L: Lefty Stewart (0–1)
HR: NYG – Mel Ott (1)

=== Game 2 ===
October 4, 1933, at the Polo Grounds in New York City

Team	1	2	3	4	5	6	7	8	9	R	H	E
Washington (A)	0	0	1	0	0	0	0	0	0	1	5	0
New York (N)	0	0	0	0	0	6	0	0	x	6	10	0
W: Hal Schumacher (1–0) L: Alvin Crowder (0–1)
HR: WAS – Goose Goslin (1)

=== Game 3 ===
October 5, 1933, at Griffith Stadium in Washington, D.C.

Team	1	2	3	4	5	6	7	8	9	R	H	E
New York (N)	0	0	0	0	0	0	0	0	0	0	5	0
Washington (A)	2	1	0	0	0	0	1	0	x	4	9	1
W: Earl Whitehill (1–0) L: Freddie Fitzsimmons (0–1) S: Hi Bell (1)

=== Game 4 ===
October 6, 1933, at Griffith Stadium in Washington, D.C.

Team	1	2	3	4	5	6	7	8	9	10	11	R	H	E
New York (N)	0	0	0	1	0	0	0	0	0	0	1	2	11	1
Washington (A)	0	0	0	0	0	0	1	0	0	0	0	1	8	0
W: Carl Hubbell (2–0) L: Monte Weaver (0–1)
HR: NYG – Bill Terry (1)

=== Game 5 ===
October 7, 1933, at Griffith Stadium in Washington, D.C.

Team	1	2	3	4	5	6	7	8	9	10	R	H	E
New York (N)	0	2	0	0	0	1	0	0	0	1	4	11	1
Washington (A)	0	0	0	0	0	3	0	0	0	0	3	10	0
W: Dolf Luque (2–0) L: Jack Russell (0–1)
HR: NYG – Mel Ott (2) WAS – Fred Schulte (1)

== Farm system ==
Level	Team	League	Manager
A	Chattanooga Lookouts	Southern Association	Bert Niehoff
C	Springfield Chicks	Middle Atlantic League	Jake Pitler
