= Mem Lovett =

American baseball player (1912–1995)

- Pinch hitter
- Born: June 15, 1912; Chicago, Illinois, U.S.
- Died: September 19, 1995 (aged 83); Downers Grove, Illinois, U.S.
- Batted: Right Threw: Right

MLB debut
- September 4, 1933, for the Chicago White Sox

Last MLB appearance
- September 4, 1933, for the Chicago White Sox

MLB statistics
- Batting average: .000 (0-for-1)
- Games played: 1
- Stats at Baseball Reference

Teams
- Chicago White Sox (1933)

Merritt Marwood "Mem" Lovett (June 15, 1912 – September 19, 1995) was an American professional baseball player who appeared as a pinch-hitter in one Major League Baseball (MLB) game, for the 1933 Chicago White Sox. Listed at 5 feet 9.5 inches (1.765 m) and 165 pounds (75 kg), he batted and threw right-handed.

== Biography ==
Lovett played on three freshman sports teams at the University of Chicago: football, basketball, and baseball. He was one of several players that the Chicago White Sox added as September call-ups in 1933; fellow call-up Milt Bocek went on to play a total of 30 games for the White Sox during 1933 and 1934.

Lovett's only major league appearance came on September 4, 1933. Facing the Detroit Tigers in a road doubleheader at Navin Field, Lovett entered the first game as a pinch hitter in the top of the ninth inning, with the Tigers leading, 8–0. Batting for center fielder Mule Haas, Lovett came to the plate with two outs and catcher Frank Grube on base. The available play-by-play for the game simply says that Lovett made an out, ending the game; years later, Lovett recounted that he swung at the first pitch thrown to him by Detroit pitcher Vic Sorrell, resulting in an infield pop-up, likely caught by first baseman Hank Greenberg.

Baseball records do not include statistics for Lovett in minor league baseball. Lovett stated that he was released by the White Sox prior to the 1934 season, after he declined their request to play for a farm team in Longview, Texas. He described then being signed by the Cincinnati Reds, at first to play in Bartlesville, Oklahoma, and then in Lincoln, Nebraska, before leaving in June to return to his hometown of Chicago, as he did not like the minor league playing conditions. Newspaper reports did mention Lovett playing for the Lincoln Links of the Nebraska State League during May 1934.

After his brief professional baseball career, Lovett worked in a bank while also playing semi-professional baseball. He also was a member of a touring basketball team called the Chicago Circus Clowns, somewhat like the Harlem Globetrotters. He later worked for the Glidden paint company for 40 years, until his retirement in 1977. Lovett died in 1995 in Downers Grove, Illinois. He had been married twice, and had four children and four step-children.
