= 1933 Chicago White Sox season =

1933 Chicago White Sox
- League: American League
- Ballpark: Comiskey Park
- City: Chicago, Illinois
- Owners: J. Louis Comiskey
- General manager: Harry Grabiner
- Managers: Lew Fonseca
- Radio: WGN (Bob Elson); WIND (Johnny O'Hara); WMAQ (Hal Totten)

The 1933 Chicago White Sox season was the team's 33rd season in the major leagues and its 34th season overall. In their second season under manager Lew Fonseca, the White Sox compiled a 67–83 record and finished in sixth place in the American League, 31 games behind the first place Washington Senators.

The team had three players who were later inducted into the Baseball Hall of Fame:

- Outfielder Al Simmons was inducted in 1953. He led the 1933 team in batting average (.331), hits (200), home runs (14), and RBIs (119). He also ranked first among the American League's left fielders in assists (16), putouts (344), range factor (2.50), and fielding percentage (.989). He was also named to the 1933 American League All-Star team and finished eighth in the American League MVP voting.
- Shortstop Luke Appling was inducted in 1964. In 1933, he ranked second on the team in batting average (.322) and led the team in doubles (35) and triples (10). He also ranked first among the American League's shortstops in assists (534), range factor (5.62), and errors (55).
- Pitcher Ted Lyons was inducted in 1955. He led the 1933 team in wins (10), losses (21), innings pitched (228), and strikeouts (74). His 21 losses also led the American League.

The team's other statistical leaders included outfielder Evar Swanson (102 runs scored, 93 walks, .411 on-base percentage, 19 stolen bases), third baseman Jimmy Dykes (12 times hit by pitch to lead the American League), and relief pitcher Joe Heving (2.67 ERA).

The team was owned by J. Louis Comiskey and played its home games at Comiskey Park.

== Regular season ==
=== Season standings ===
American League
Team	W	L	Pct.	GB	Home	Road
Washington Senators	99	53	.651	—	46‍–‍30	53‍–‍23
New York Yankees	91	59	.607	7	51‍–‍23	40‍–‍36
Philadelphia Athletics	79	72	.523	19½	46‍–‍29	33‍–‍43
Cleveland Indians	75	76	.497	23½	45‍–‍32	30‍–‍44
Detroit Tigers	75	79	.487	25	43‍–‍35	32‍–‍44
Chicago White Sox	67	83	.447	31	35‍–‍41	32‍–‍42
Boston Red Sox	63	86	.423	34½	32‍–‍40	31‍–‍46
St. Louis Browns	55	96	.364	43½	30‍–‍46	25‍–‍50

=== Record vs. opponents ===
1933 American League record Sources:
Team	BOS	CWS	CLE	DET	NYY	PHA	SLB	WSH
Boston	—	11–7	6–16	11–11	8–14	14–8	9–13	4–17
Chicago	7–11	—	9–13	10–12	7–15–1	12–10	15–7	7–15
Cleveland	16–6	13–9	—	10–12	7–13	6–16	15–7	8–13
Detroit	11–11	12–10	12–10	—	7–15	11–11	14–8–1	8–14
New York	14–8	15–7–1	13–7	15–7	—	12–9	14–7–1	8–14
Philadelphia	8–14	10–12	16–6	11–11	9–12	—	14–6	11–11–1
St. Louis	13–9	7–15	7–15	8–14–1	7–14–1	6–14	—	7–15
Washington	17–4	15–7	13–8	14–8	14–8	11–11–1	15–7	—

=== Roster ===
1933 Chicago White Sox
Roster
Pitchers: 17 Ed Durham; 18 Red Faber; 19 Vic Frazier; 23 Milt Gaston; 24 Paul Gregory; 24 Hal Haid; 25 Joe Heving; 34 Ira Hutchinson; 28 Sam Jones; 29 Chad Kimsey; 16 Ted Lyons; 38 Jake Miller; 35 George Murray; 35 Les Tietje; 19 Whit Wyatt	Catchers: 15 Charlie Berry; 14 Frank Grube; Infielders: 4 Luke Appling; 7 Jimmy Dykes; 8 Charlie English; 1 Lew Fonseca; 2 Jackie Hayes; 3 Red Kress; 12 Hal Rhyne; 36 Billy Sullivan	Outfielders: 27 Milt Bocek; 8 Liz Funk; 6 Mule Haas; 5 Al Simmons; 17 John Stoneham; 9 Evar Swanson; 34 Earl Webb; Other batters: -- Mem Lovett	Manager: 1 Lew Fonseca; Coaches: 37 Jimmy Austin

== Player stats ==
=== Batting ===
==== Starters by position ====
Note: Pos = Position; G = Games played; AB = At bats; H = Hits; Avg. = Batting average; HR = Home runs; RBI = Runs batted in

Pos	Player	G	AB	H	Avg.	HR	RBI
C	Frank Grube	85	256	59	.230	0	23
1B	Red Kress	129	467	116	.248	10	78
2B	Jackie Hayes	138	535	138	.258	2	47
SS	Luke Appling	151	612	197	.322	6	85
3B	Jimmy Dykes	151	554	144	.260	1	68
OF	Al Simmons	146	605	200	.331	14	119
OF	Evar Swanson	144	539	165	.306	1	63
OF	Mule Haas	146	585	168	.287	1	51

==== Other batters ====
Note: G = Games played; AB = At bats; H = Hits; Avg. = Batting average; HR = Home runs; RBI = Runs batted in

Player	G	AB	H	Avg.	HR	RBI
Charlie Berry	86	271	69	.255	2	28
Billy Sullivan	54	125	24	.192	0	13
Earl Webb	58	107	31	.290	1	8
Hal Rhyne	39	83	22	.265	0	10
Lew Fonseca	23	59	12	.203	2	15
John Stoneham	10	25	3	.120	1	3
Milt Bocek	11	22	8	.364	1	3
Charlie English	3	9	4	.444	0	1
Liz Funk	10	9	2	.222	0	0
Mem Lovett	1	1	0	.000	0	0

=== Pitching ===
==== Starting pitchers ====
Note: G = Games pitched; IP = Innings pitched; W = Wins; L = Losses; ERA = Earned run average; SO = Strikeouts

Player	G	IP	W	L	ERA	SO
Ted Lyons	36	228.0	10	21	4.38	74
Sad Sam Jones	27	176.2	10	12	3.36	60
Milt Gaston	30	167.0	8	12	4.85	39
Ed Durham	24	138.2	10	6	4.48	65
Paul Gregory	23	103.2	4	11	4.95	18
Les Tietje	3	22.1	2	0	2.42	9
Ira Hutchinson	1	4.0	0	0	13.50	2

==== Other pitchers ====
Note: G = Games pitched; IP = Innings pitched; W = Wins; L = Losses; ERA = Earned run average; SO = Strikeouts

Player	G	IP	W	L	ERA	SO
Jake Miller	26	105.2	5	6	5.62	30
Whit Wyatt	26	87.2	3	4	4.62	31

==== Relief pitchers ====
Note: G = Games pitched; W = Wins; L = Losses; SV = Saves; ERA = Earned run average; SO = Strikeouts

Player	G	W	L	SV	ERA	SO
Joe Heving	40	7	5	6	2.67	47
Red Faber	36	3	4	5	3.44	18
Chad Kimsey	28	4	1	0	5.53	19
Vic Frazier	10	1	1	0	8.85	4
Hal Haid	6	0	0	0	7.98	7
George Murray	2	0	0	0	7.71	0
