= Earl Whitehill =

American baseball player (1899–1954)

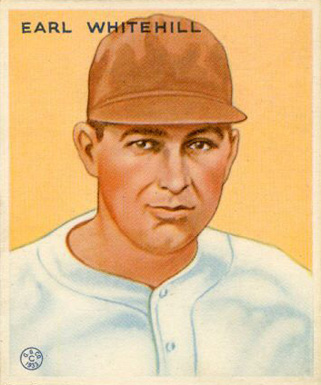
- Pitcher
- Born: February 7, 1899; Cedar Rapids, Iowa, U.S.
- Died: October 22, 1954 (aged 55); Omaha, Nebraska, U.S.
- Batted: Left Threw: Left

MLB debut
- September 15, 1923, for the Detroit Tigers

Last MLB appearance
- September 30, 1939, for the Chicago Cubs

MLB statistics
- Win–loss record: 218–185
- Earned run average: 4.36
- Strikeouts: 1,350
- Stats at Baseball Reference

Teams
- Detroit Tigers (1923–1932); Washington Senators (1933–1936); Cleveland Indians (1937–1938); Chicago Cubs (1939)

Earl Oliver Whitehill (February 7, 1899 – October 22, 1954) was an American Major League Baseball pitcher. He played for the Detroit Tigers for the most significant portion of his career (1923–1932), and later with the Washington Senators (1933–1936), Cleveland Indians (1937–38), and the Chicago Cubs (1939). Consistently winning in double digits for thirteen years (1924–1936), left-handed Whitehill went on to become one of the top winning pitchers of all time. He was born in Cedar Rapids, Iowa.

== Major league career ==
"The Earl", as many called him, was a handsome and often temperamental pitcher who often showed up in the top 10 in hit batsmen, leading the league in his first full year, 1924, when he hit 13 (tied with George Uhle).

Whitehill averaged 14 wins each season and he never dipped below 11 wins in a full season (30 starts or more). Whitehill made his debut on September 15, 1923. He was a small left-handed pitcher, who weighed around 174 pounds (79 kg). With Detroit, he came to be known as one of the most consistent pitchers in the league. From 1928 through 1932, he never had an ERA higher than 4.62 and never had one lower than 4.08; a difference of only .54 in those years.

In his rookie season, Whitehill was 17–8, with a 3.86 ERA, and two shutouts. The Tigers' offensive support helped, as the Tigers finished 1st in most major offensive categories in 1923. Reduced run support became a factor later in his stint with Detroit, which lead some to believe his overall record could have been better. In his early years with Detroit, Whitehill was part of a starting rotation that included Hooks Dauss, Dutch Leonard, and Lil Stoner.

Whitehill, one of the top pitchers of the Roaring Twenties, had a celebrity marriage to Violet Geissinger. Geissinger was a model for Sun-Maid Raisins during the 1920s. She was known as The Sun-Maid Raisin Girl.

After he was traded to Washington, for Firpo Marberry and Carl Fischer, Whitehill fit right in there, going a career-best 22–8 in his first year, with a 3.33 ERA (also a career-best, excluding his first year when he pitched in 8 games and had a 2.73 ERA). With Washington that year, he saw his first (and last) postseason action, when the Senators were defeated by the New York Giants in 5 games. However, Whitehill did his part, getting the only win of the series for Washington. In that game, he pitched a complete game shutout allowing 5 hits and 2 walks. Because he didn't start until Game 3, it became his only start of the Series, and his only start of the postseason. Thus, his final postseason ERA was 0.00, tied with many others for a record.

He one-hit the St. Louis Browns on July 4, 1932, Goose Goslin recording the only hit for the Browns. Whitehill also one-hit the New York Yankees on May 30, 1934. The Yanks' Ben Chapman broke up the no-hitter in the ninth inning.

He was traded as part of a three team deal on December 10, 1936. The Senators received Jack Salveson from the Chicago White Sox, who received Thornton Lee from the Indians, which is where Whitehill was headed. In Cleveland, Whitehill had two average years and made a number of relief appearances (mostly in 1937). His final record with the Indians was 17–16.

Whitehill signed with the Cubs in 1939, went 4–7 with a 5.14 ERA there, and was released in October 1939. In 17 seasons, he was 218–185 with a career ERA of 4.36, having given up 1726 earned runs in 3564 2/3 innings pitched. He recorded 1350 career strikeouts. He pitched in 541 games, 473 of them starts. His lifetime ERA of 4.36 is higher than any other 200-game winner.

A competent hitting pitcher in his 17 years in the majors, Whitehill compiled a .204 batting average (264-for-1291) with 107 runs, 4 home runs, 98 RBI and 97 bases on balls.

== Later life ==
After serving as a coach for the Indians, the Philadelphia Phillies, and in the International League in the early 1940s, he became a sales representative for the A. G. Spalding sporting goods firm. Whitehill died from injuries sustained in an automobile accident in Omaha, Nebraska, at the age of 55.

== Quick facts ==
- On April 23, 1933, Whitehill knocked Lou Gehrig unconscious with a pitch during Gehrig's famed games played streak. Gehrig recovered and finished the game.
- Had highest (worst) earned run average of any 200-game winner with 4.36 (winning answer in 1987 SABR trivia semi-final).

== See also ==
- List of Major League Baseball career wins leaders
- List of Major League Baseball career hit batsmen leaders
