= Rick Ferrell =

American baseball player (1905–1995)

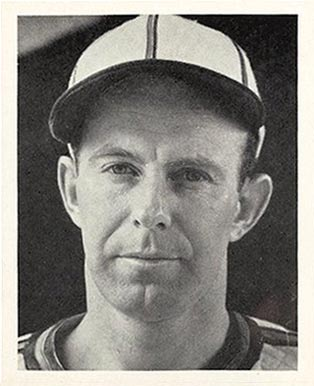
- Ferrell in 1941
- Catcher
- Born: October 12, 1905; Durham, North Carolina, U.S.
- Died: July 27, 1995 (aged 89); Bloomfield Hills, Michigan, U.S.
- Batted: Right Threw: Right

MLB debut
- April 19, 1929, for the St. Louis Browns

Last MLB appearance
- September 14, 1947, for the Washington Senators

MLB statistics
- Batting average: .281
- Home runs: 28
- Runs batted in: 734
- Stats at Baseball Reference

Teams
- St. Louis Browns (1929–1933); Boston Red Sox (1933–1937); Washington Senators (1937–1941); St. Louis Browns (1941–1943); Washington Senators (1944–1945, 1947)

Career highlights and awards
- 8× All-Star (1933–1938, 1944, 1945); Boston Red Sox Hall of Fame; Washington Nationals Ring of Honor

Member of the National

Baseball Hall of Fame
- Induction: 1984
- Election method: Veterans Committee

Richard Benjamin Ferrell (October 12, 1905 – July 27, 1995) was an American professional baseball player, coach, scout, and executive. He played for 18 seasons as a catcher in Major League Baseball (MLB) from 1929 through 1947 for the St. Louis Browns, Boston Red Sox, and Washington Senators. His brother, Wes Ferrell, was a major league pitcher for 15 seasons, and they were teammates from 1933 through part of 1938 on the Red Sox and Senators. Following his three seasons in minor league baseball, he appealed to the Commissioner of Baseball to become a free agent, claiming that he was being held in the minors though he deserved promotion. The Commissioner agreed, and he was granted free agency; he signed with the St. Louis Browns.

Ferrell was regarded as one of the best catchers in baseball during the 1930s and early 1940s. While playing for the Red Sox in 1933, he and his brother Wes were selected to play for the American League (AL) team in the inaugural 1933 Major League Baseball All-Star Game held on July 6, 1933. His 1,806 games played as a catcher set an AL longevity record which stood for more than 40 years. A seven-time All-Star, (Note: MLB cancelled the 1945 All-Star Game and did not name All-Stars that season.) Ferrell was elected to the Baseball Hall of Fame in 1984 by the Veterans Committee. After his playing career, he became a coach with the Senators, and later a scout and general manager with the Detroit Tigers. He died in July 1995 at the age of 89.

== Early life ==
Ferrell was born on October 12, 1905, in Durham, North Carolina, to Rufus and Alice, and grew up on a 160-acre dairy farm near Greensboro, North Carolina. He was one of seven boys, and two of his brothers enjoyed long careers in baseball. Wes Ferrell reached the major leagues as a pitcher while another brother, George Ferrell, played as an outfielder in minor league baseball. Rick attended Guilford College in Greensboro where he played both baseball and basketball.

In 1926, he was signed by the Detroit Tigers of the American League (AL), and was assigned to play for the Kinston Eagles of the Virginia League. Shortly afterward, he was promoted to the Columbus Senators of the American Association, and in 1928 he posted a .333 batting average with them. His performance that season earned him an American Association All-Star position.

During the season, he personally asked Detroit's owner, Frank Navin, if the organization had a plan in place to bring him up to the Tigers. Navin told him to be patient and return to Columbus. When the season concluded, another Columbus catcher, Hugh McMullen, was called up to the major leagues, but to the Cincinnati Reds instead of the Tigers. Confused as to who actually owned his contract, Ferrell inquired with the Reds about his status with the organization, and was again told to return to Columbus. After reading through his contract, he believed he was being unfairly held in the minor leagues, so he petitioned the Commissioner of Baseball, Kenesaw Mountain Landis, to grant him a hearing. It was discovered that Columbus owner, Joseph Carr, had been shopping Ferrell's contract, receiving offers as high as $50,000 (equivalent to $916,000 in 2024), though none were formally presented on paper. Navin protested to Landis, claiming he was unaware of what Carr was doing.

After the Commissioner completed his investigation, he determined that the Tigers and Reds had colluded to keep Ferrell in the minor leagues, and directed Carr to shop for buyers. This move by the two teams effectively hid him from the other major league teams' draft rights to increase Ferrell's sale price. This was a common, although illegal, practice during this era, so Landis declared Ferrell a free agent, allowing him to sign a contract with any team he chose, except the Tigers. After receiving offers from many major league clubs, he signed a contract with the St. Louis Browns of the AL for $25,000 (equivalent to $458,000 in 2024).

== Major leagues ==
Ferrell made his major league debut with the Browns at the age of 23 on April 19, 1929. He spent the 1929 season as a reserve catcher backing up veteran Wally Schang, and had a .229 batting average in 64 games. New Browns manager and former catcher, Bill Killefer, made Ferrell his starting catcher for the next three seasons, and he would catch in more than 100 games in each. His batting average rose to .306 in 1931, elevating him one to one of the best catchers in the American League. Although he led the league's catchers in errors and passed balls, he also led the league in assists. In 1932, Ferrell hit .315, the best among American League catchers, with 30 doubles and 65 runs batted in. He ended the season ranked 13th in voting for the 1932 American League Most Valuable Player Award.

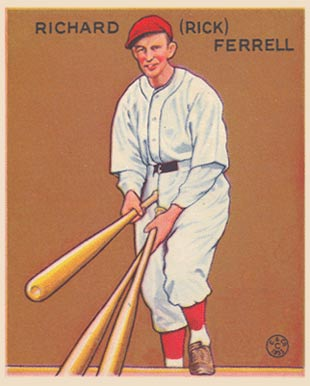
Ferrell in 1934

On May 10, 1933, the financially strained Browns traded Ferrell, along with Lloyd Brown to the Boston Red Sox, in exchange for Merv Shea and some cash. Two months later, Ferrell was selected along with his brother to play for the American League team in the inaugural Major League Baseball All-Star Game held on July 6, 1933. American League manager Connie Mack used Ferrell to catch the entire game in a 4–2 American League victory, even though future Baseball Hall of Fame catcher Bill Dickey was also on the team. When the Red Sox played the Cleveland Indians two weeks later on July 19, 1933, Ferrell hit a home run against his brother Wes, who later hit a home run off Boston pitcher Hank Johnson, marking the first time in major league history that brothers on opposing teams had hit home runs in the same game. Ferrell ended the year with a .290 batting average along with a career-high 77 runs batted in. Although Ferrell once again led American League catchers in errors, he also led in assists and in baserunners caught stealing. Despite the Red Sox' seventh-place finish, Ferrell ranked 12th in voting for the 1933 American League Most Valuable Player Award.

In 1934, the Red Sox signed Ferrell's brother Wes, forming a formidable battery for the next 3 1/2 seasons. Rick ended the year with a .297 batting average and led the league's catchers in fielding percentage and in putouts and finished second in assists. With Ferrell calling the pitches in 1935, his brother pitched to a 25–14 won–loss record, and was runner-up to Hank Greenberg in voting for the 1935 American League Most Valuable Player Award. Ferrell posted a .301 batting average for the year and led the league in baserunners caught stealing.

Ferrell had another good year in 1936, leading the league with a .439 batting average at the beginning of May to earn the starting catcher's berth for the American League team in the 1936 All-Star Game. He ended the season with a .312 batting average along with career-highs in home runs (8) and in on-base percentage (.406). He also led the league's catchers in putouts and finished second in fielding percentage. In June 1937, Ferrell was hitting for a .308 batting average when he was traded to the Washington Senators along with his brother and Mel Almada for pitcher Bobo Newsom and outfielder Ben Chapman. Between 1933 and 1936, Ferrell broke Red Sox catchers' records in batting average, doubles, home runs and runs batted in. His .302 batting average with Boston is currently 15th on the club's all-time list.

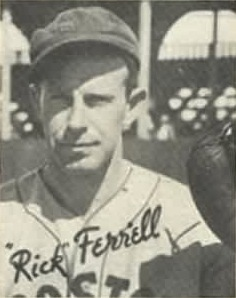
Ferrell in 1936

Playing with a broken right hand, he ended the year with the Senators and batted .244 over the course of the season. Ferrell rebounded in 1938 with a .298 batting average and led the league in baserunners caught stealing. The Senators released his brother Wes in August 1938. In May 1941, Ferrell was traded back to the St. Louis Browns, in exchange for Vern Kennedy, and went on to catch 100 games for the sixth-place Browns. In 1942, the 36-year-old Ferrell shared catching duties with Frankie Hayes as the Browns improved to an 82–69 won-loss record to finish the year in third place.

Ferrell was once again traded; this time he returned to the Senators in March 1944. He earned a reputation as one of the best knuckleball catchers in baseball when he had the arduous task of catching for a Senators' starting pitching staff made up entirely of knuckleball pitchers. Dutch Leonard, Johnny Niggeling, Roger Wolff, and Mickey Haefner all threw the notoriously difficult-to-catch knuckleball, making Ferrell the first catcher in major league history to accomplish the feat. Although Ferrell led the league in passed balls due to the unpredictability of the knuckleball, he was still named to his seventh All-Star Game. The Senators ended the season in last place while Ferrell's former team, the St. Louis Browns won the 1944 American League pennant.

Ferrell shared catching duties with Al Evans in 1945 as the Senators started to win regularly. On July 6, 1945, Ferrell broke Ray Schalk's American League record for most games caught with 1,721. The 1945 All-Star Game which was supposed to be played on July 10 was cancelled on April 24 due to wartime travel restrictions, and no All-Stars were officially named that season. In place of the All-Star Game, seven out of eight scheduled interleague games were played on July 9 and 10 that raised funds for the American Red Cross and War Relief Fund. In the final week of the 1945 season, the Senators came within 1 1/2 games of winning the American League pennant, ultimately clinched by the Detroit Tigers. Ferrell retired as a player to become a Senators' coach for the 1946 season. However, he returned to play as a catcher for 37 games in 1947, hitting for a .303 batting average. He played his final major league game on September 14, 1947 at the age of 41.

== Post-playing career and legacy ==
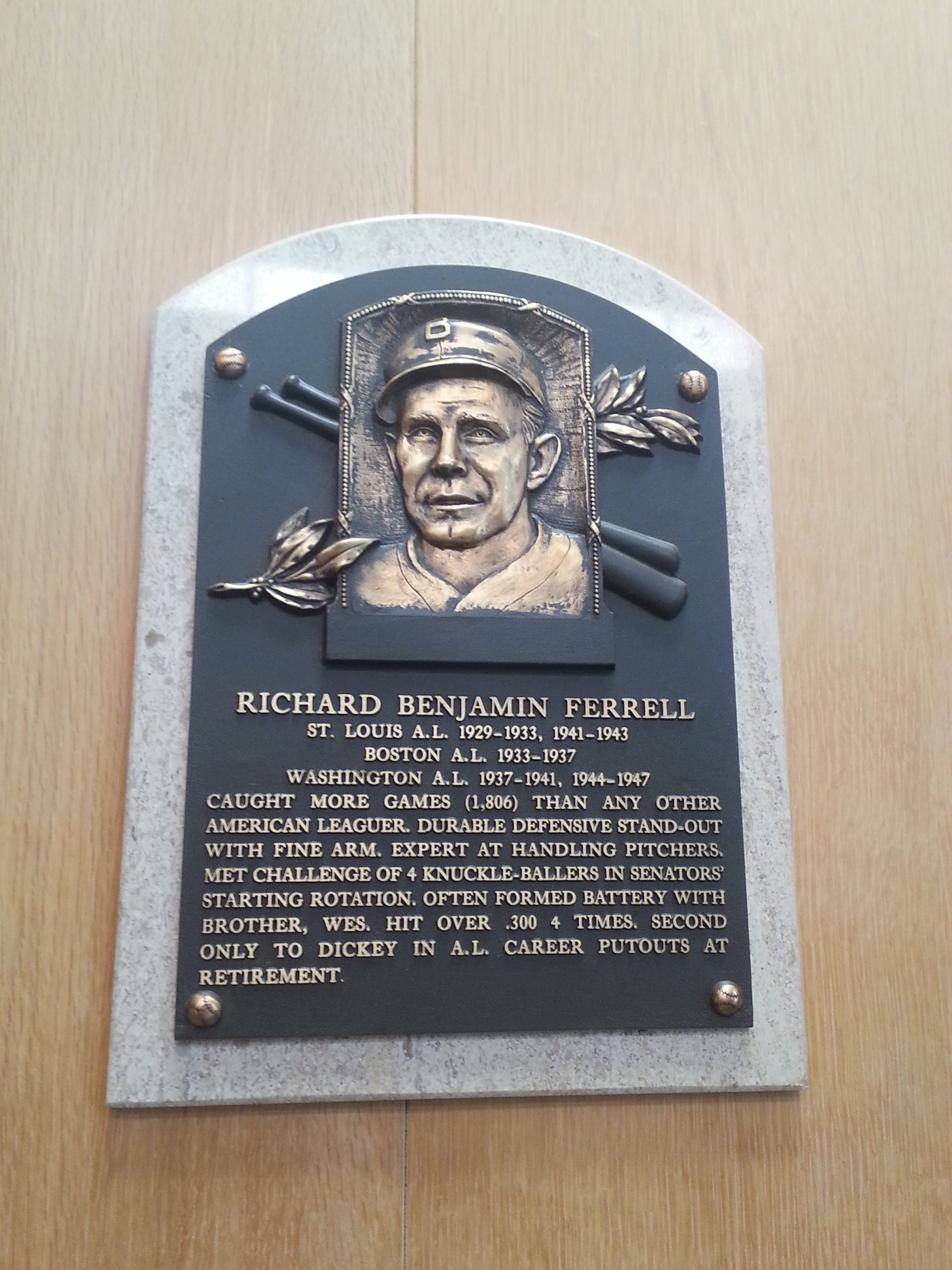
Plaque of Rick Ferrell at the Baseball Hall of Fame

In an 18-year career, Ferrell played in 1,884 games, accumulating 1,692 hits in 6,028 at bats for a .281 career batting average along with 28 home runs, 734 runs batted in and an impressive on-base percentage of .378. He hit over .300 four times during his career, and his on-base percentage is eighth all-time among the 50 catchers with 3,000 at bats. A patient hitter, Ferrell logged just 277 strikeouts during his career, along with 931 bases on balls. He ended his career with a .984 fielding percentage. An eight-time All-Star with a strong throwing arm, he led American League catchers four times in baserunners caught stealing, and twice in assists and putouts. Ferrell retired having caught 1,806 games, an American League record that stood until Carlton Fisk surpassed it in 1988. He currently ranks 12th all-time in games played as a catcher.

Ferrell continued as a coach for the Senators in 1948 and 1949. He then joined the Detroit Tigers as a coach from 1950 to 1954 before retiring from the field altogether. Afterwards, he served as a scout then as the scouting director for the Tigers before becoming the general manager and vice president in 1959. He held the position for four years, with veteran executive Bill DeWitt taking the leading role in baseball operations from late 1959 through the 1960 season as club president, before turning the general manager role over to Jim Campbell at the close of the 1962 campaign. Ferrell remained with the team as a senior member of its front office. During his tenure as a Tigers executive, the team won two World Series championships, in 1968 and in 1984, and won two American League Eastern Division titles in 1972 and in 1987.

In his 1985 book, The Bill James Historical Baseball Abstract, baseball historian Bill James ranked Ferrell as the third best catcher in the American League during his career, behind only Mickey Cochrane and Bill Dickey. Ferrell was elected by the Veterans Committee, along with Pee Wee Reese, to the Baseball Hall of Fame in 1984. He retired in 1992 at the age of 87 after 42 years with the Tigers organization.

Ferrell was married to Ruth Virginia Wilson from 1941 until her death in 1968. Together they had four children, two sons and two daughters. His family first lived in Greensboro, then later in Grosse Pointe, Michigan. He lived in Troy, Michigan, for the remaining 18 years of his life, until he was admitted into a nursing home in Bloomfield Hills, Michigan. It was here that he died of arrhythmia on July 27, 1995, and is interred at New Garden Cemetery in Greensboro, North Carolina.

== See also ==
- Boston Red Sox Hall of Fame
