= Johnny Watwood =

American baseball player (1905–1980)

- Outfielder
- Born: August 17, 1905; Alexander City, Alabama, U.S.
- Died: March 1, 1980 (aged 74); Goodwater, Alabama, U.S.
- Batted: Left Threw: Left

MLB debut
- April 16, 1929, for the Chicago White Sox

Last MLB appearance
- May 29, 1939, for the Philadelphia Phillies

MLB statistics
- Batting average: .283
- Home runs: 5
- Runs batted in: 158
- Stats at Baseball Reference

Teams
- Chicago White Sox (1929–1932); Boston Red Sox (1932–1933); Philadelphia Phillies (1939)

John Clifford Watwood (August 17, 1905 – March 1, 1980), nicknamed "Lefty", was an American professional baseball outfielder in Major League Baseball, playing mainly at center field for three different teams between the 1929 and 1939 seasons. Listed at 6 ft 1 in (1.85 m), 186 lb., Watwood batted and threw left-handed. A native of Alexander City, Alabama, he attended Auburn University.

A strong-armed outfielder and basically a line-drive hitter, Watwood entered the majors in April 1929 with the Chicago White Sox, playing for them until April 1932 before joining the Boston Red Sox (1932–1933) and Philadelphia Phillies (1939). His most productive season came with the 1930 White Sox, when he posted career-highs in games (133), batting average (.382), runs (75), RBI (51), extrabases (31) and on-base percentage (.382).

In 1931 Watwood hit .283 in 128 games for Chicago, and later was sent to the Red Sox in a five-player transaction that included teammates OF Smead Jolley and C Bennie Tate in exchange for C Charlie Berry and OF Jack Rothrock. While in Boston, he served as a backup for Jolley (LF), Tom Oliver (CF) and Roy Johnson (RF).

After that, Watwood spent five years in the minor leagues (1934–1938), managing also the 1938 Houston Buffaloes before returning to major league with the Phillies.

In a six-year majors career, Watwood was a .283 hitter (403-for-1423) with five home runs and 158 RBI in 469 games, including 192 runs, 66 doubles, 16 triples, 27 stolen bases, and a solid 1.50 walk-to-strikeout ratio (154-to-103). In 299 outfield appearances, he posted a collective .948 fielding percentage (40 errors in 776 total chances) and also played 86 games at first base (.982, 15 errors, 844 TC).

From 1929 Watwood lived in Goodwater, Alabama where he died in 1980 at the age of 74.
