= Marv Olson =

American baseball player (1907–1998)

- Second baseman
- Born: May 28, 1907; Gayville, South Dakota, U.S.
- Died: February 5, 1998 (aged 90); Tyndall, South Dakota, U.S.
- Batted: Right Threw: Right

MLB debut
- September 13, 1931, for the Boston Red Sox

Last MLB appearance
- April 30, 1933, for the Boston Red Sox

MLB statistics
- Batting average: .241
- Home runs: 0
- Runs batted in: 30
- Stats at Baseball Reference

Teams
- Boston Red Sox (1931–1933)

Marvin Clement Olson [Sparky] (May 28, 1907 – February 5, 1998) was an American second baseman in Major League Baseball who played from 1931 through 1933 for the Boston Red Sox. Listed at 5 ft 7 in (1.70 m), 160 lb., Olson batted and threw right-handed. A native of Gayville, South Dakota, he attended Luther College.

Olson was a late-season callup by the Red Sox in 1931 and the starting second baseman for much of 1932. In 1933, Olson appeared in three games before being traded to the New York Yankees on May 15, along with Johnny Watwood and cash, for Dusty Cooke, but would never appear in another major league game. He did, however, continue to play in the minor leagues for various teams until 1947.

In a three-season major league career, Olson was a .241 hitter (110-for-403) with 67 runs and 30 RBI in 133 games, including 15 doubles, six triples and one stolen base with no home runs.

Olson died at the age of 90 in Tyndall, South Dakota.
