= Roy Johnson (1930s outfielder) =

American baseball player (1903–1973)

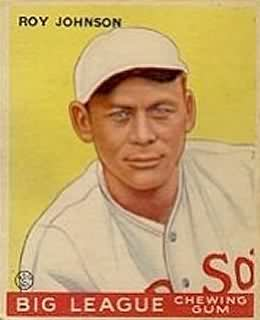
- Outfielder
- Born: February 23, 1903; Pryor, Oklahoma, U.S.
- Died: September 10, 1973 (aged 70); Tacoma, Washington, U.S.
- Batted: Left Threw: Right

MLB debut
- April 18, 1929, for the Detroit Tigers

Last MLB appearance
- April 27, 1938, for the Boston Bees

MLB statistics
- Batting average: .296
- Home runs: 58
- Runs batted in: 555
- Stats at Baseball Reference

Teams
- Detroit Tigers (1929–1932); Boston Red Sox (1932–1935); New York Yankees (1936–1937); Boston Bees (1937–1938)

Career highlights and awards
- World Series champion (1936)

Roy Cleveland Johnson (February 23, 1903 – September 10, 1973) was an American left fielder and right fielder in Major League Baseball who played for the Detroit Tigers (1929–32), Boston Red Sox (1932–35), New York Yankees (1936–37) and Boston Bees (1937–38). A native of Pryor, Oklahoma, who grew up in Tacoma, Washington, he was the elder brother of "Indian Bob" Johnson, also a major league outfielder. The Johnson brothers were one-quarter Cherokee.

== Playing career ==
Roy Johnson batted left-handed and threw right-handed; he stood 5 feet 9 inches (1.75 m) tall and weighed 175 pounds (79 kg). Unlike his younger brother, who slugged 288 home runs in his 13-year MLB career, Roy was basically a contact, line-drive hitter. He also was a fine defensive outfielder with a strong throwing arm. His pro career began in 1926, when he hit .369 in the Class C Utah-Idaho League, earning him a call-up to the top-level San Francisco Seals of the Pacific Coast League. Then, in 1927 and 1928, he teamed with Earl Averill and Smead Jolley to give the Seals one of its most feared hitting-outfields in minor league history.

On October 19, 1928, the independently-operated Seals traded Johnson to the Detroit Tigers, launching his decade-long MLB career, where he would be a four-time .300 hitter, and six times finish in the Top 10 among American League (AL) leaders in stolen bases.

In his 1929 debut, Johnson became the first rookie in major league history to get 200 hits in a season (201) and also led the AL with 45 doubles and 640 at-bats while hitting .314 with a career-high 128 runs. Defensively however, he led all outfielders in the AL committing 31 errors. In 1931, he led the AL with 19 triples and stole 33 bases.

Traded by Detroit to the Red Sox in the midseason of 1932, Johnson enjoyed three productive years with Boston, hitting .313 with 95 runs batted in during 1933, however defensively, he again led the AL for the second time in his MLB career by committing 25 errors as an outfielder. Johnson followed with career-highs .320 and 119 RBI in 1934, and .315 in 1935. After that, he became a part-time outfielder with the Yankees, with whom he appeared in the 1936 World Series as a pinch runner and striking out in his only plate appearance. Johnson became a world champion when the Yanks defeated the rival New York Giants in six games.

One month into the 1937 season, the Yankees lost two in a row to the Tigers. Johnson thought that manager Joe McCarthy was brooding over the losses and snapped, "What's the guy expect to do, win every day?" In a horrible stroke of luck, McCarthy happened to overhear him. Almost as soon as he returned to the team hotel, McCarthy called general manager Ed Barrow and demanded that Johnson be waived immediately. Barrow obliged; Tommy Henrich took his spot on the roster. The Boston Bees of the National League claimed Johnson off waivers, and Johnson played 92 games as a Bee through April 27, 1938, when he was sent to the minors. He would never play in the majors again.

In his ten-season career covering 1,155 games, Johnson posted a .296 batting average (1,292-for-4,359) with 716 runs, 275 doubles, 83 triples, 58 home runs, 555 RBI, 135 stolen bases, 489 walks, .369 on-base percentage and .437 slugging percentage. He recorded a .938 fielding percentage at all three outfield positions.

Roy Johnson died in Tacoma at the age of 70 on September 10, 1973.

== Records ==
Johnson holds the following Detroit Tigers records:

- Most runs by rookie—128 (1929)
- Most doubles by rookie—45 (1929)

== Honors ==
- Tacoma-Pierce County Sports Hall of Fame (member since 1960)
- State of Washington Sports Hall of Fame (member since 1978)

== See also ==
- List of Major League Baseball annual doubles leaders
- List of Major League Baseball annual triples leaders
