= John Stoneham (baseball) =

American baseball player (1908–2004)

- Outfielder
- Born: November 8, 1908; Wood River, Illinois, U.S.
- Died: January 1, 2004 (aged 95); Owasso, Oklahoma, U.S.
- Batted: Left Threw: Right

MLB debut
- September 18, 1933, for the Chicago White Sox

Last MLB appearance
- October 1, 1933, for the Chicago White Sox

MLB statistics
- Batting average: .120
- Home runs: 1
- Runs batted in: 3
- Stats at Baseball Reference

Teams
- Chicago White Sox (1933)

John Andrew Stoneham (November 8, 1908 – January 1, 2004) was an American professional baseball player. He played in Major League Baseball as an outfielder for the Chicago White Sox in 1933. He attended Washington University in St. Louis, where he played college baseball for the Washington University Bears.
