= Hank McDonald =

American baseball player (1911-1982)

- Pitcher
- Born: January 16, 1911; Santa Monica, California
- Died: October 17, 1982 (aged 71); Hemet, California
- Batted: Right Threw: Right

MLB debut
- April 16, 1931, for the Philadelphia Athletics

Last MLB appearance
- September 30, 1933, for the Philadelphia Athletics

MLB statistics
- Win–loss record: 3–9
- Earned run average: 5.87
- Strikeouts: 46
- Stats at Baseball Reference

Teams
- Philadelphia Athletics (1931, 1933); St. Louis Browns (1933)

Henry Monroe McDonald (January 16, 1911 – October 17, 1982) was a Major League Baseball pitcher who played in 1931 and 1933 with the Philadelphia Athletics and the St. Louis Browns. He batted and threw right-handed.

== Biography ==
McDonald died in Hemet, California on October 17, 1982. He was interred at Inglewood Park Cemetery.

== Career ==
Henry "Hank" McDonald made his major league debut with the Philadelphia Athletics on April 16, 1931 where he pitched 6.2 innings while giving up 3 runs on 7 hits in his loss to the Washington Senators. During his first year with the Athletics, Hank McDonald earned a salary of $2,500 ($52,927 today) while playing under famed baseball manager, Connie Mack.
