= Jud McLaughlin =

American baseball player (1912–1964)

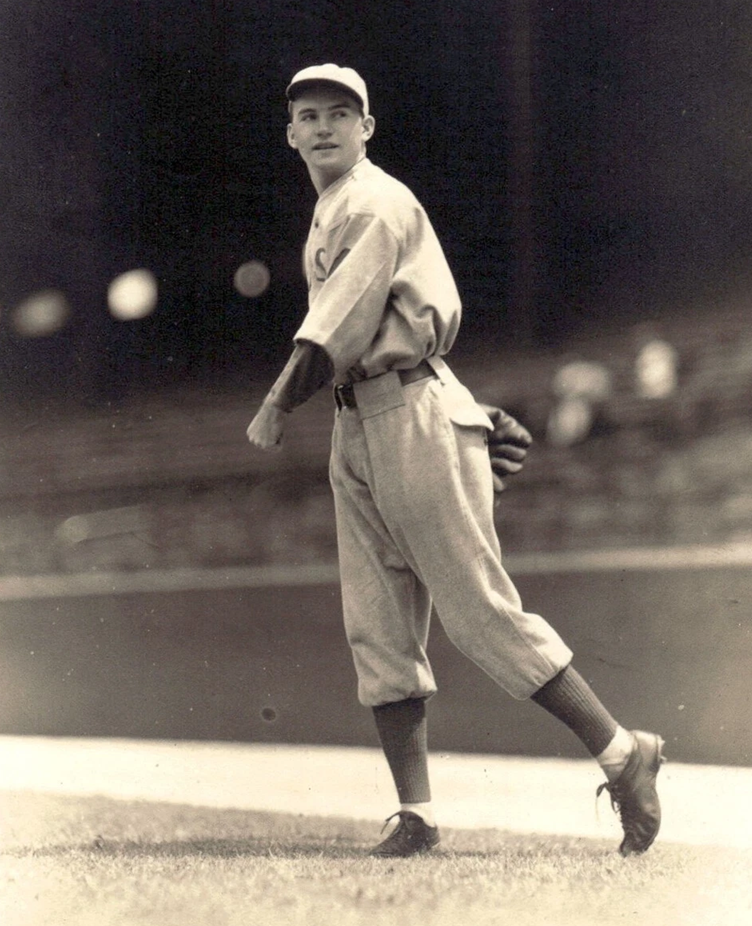
- Pitcher
- Born: March 24, 1912; Brighton, Massachusetts, U.S.
- Died: September 27, 1964 (aged 52); Cambridge, Massachusetts, U.S.
- Batted: Left Threw: Left

MLB debut
- June 23, 1931, for the Boston Red Sox

Last MLB appearance
- May 18, 1933, for the Boston Red Sox

MLB statistics
- Win–loss record: 0–0
- Earned run average: 10.27
- Strikeouts: 4
- Stats at Baseball Reference

Teams
- Boston Red Sox (1931–1933)

Justin Theodore McLaughlin (March 24, 1912 – September 27, 1964) was an American relief pitcher in Major League Baseball who played from 1931 through 1933 for the Boston Red Sox. Listed at 5 ft 11 in (1.80 m), 155 lb., McLaughlin batted and threw left-handed.

A native of Brighton, Massachusetts, McLaughlin attended Boston College. In a three-season major league career, McLaughlin posted a 10.27 ERA in 16 appearances for the Red Sox, including four strikeouts, 17 walks, 42 hits allowed and 23 2/3 innings of work, without gaining a decision or save. In 1935, McLaughlin played for Falmouth in the Cape Cod Baseball League. He died in 1964 in Cambridge, Massachusetts at age 52.

== See also ==
- Boston Red Sox all-time roster
