= Allen Sothoron =

American baseball player and manager (1893–1939)

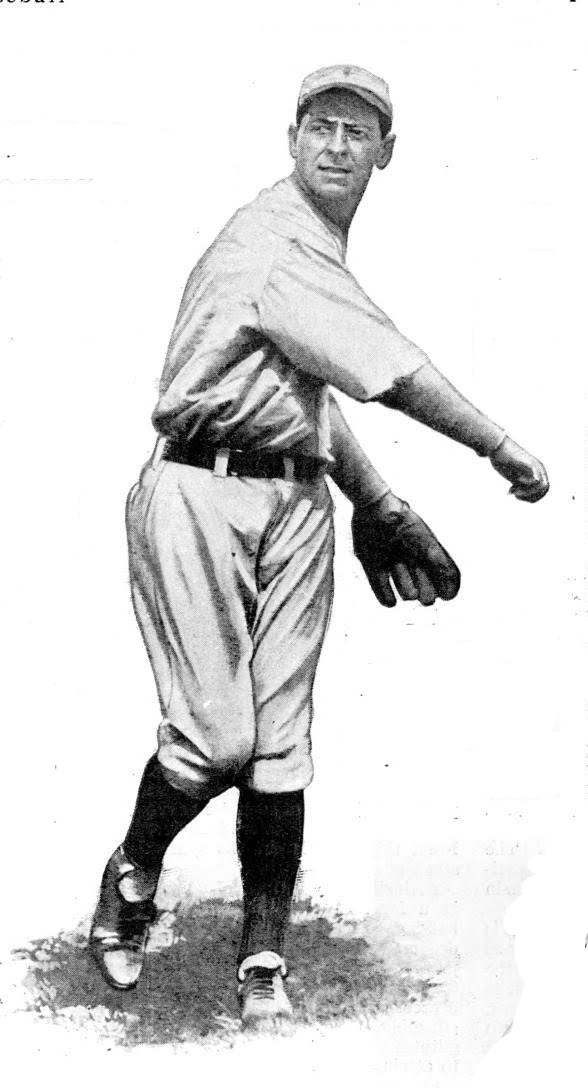
- Pitcher / Manager
- Born: April 27, 1893; Bradford, Ohio, U.S.
- Died: June 17, 1939 (aged 46); St. Louis, Missouri, U.S.
- Batted: Switch Threw: Right

MLB debut
- September 17, 1914, for the St. Louis Browns

Last MLB appearance
- September 6, 1926, for the St. Louis Cardinals

MLB statistics
- Win–loss record: 91–99
- Earned run average: 3.31
- Strikeouts: 576
- Managerial record: 2–6
- Winning %: .250
- Stats at Baseball Reference

Teams
- As player: St. Louis Browns (1914–1915, 1917–1921); Boston Red Sox (1921); Cleveland Indians (1921–1922); St. Louis Cardinals (1924–1926); As manager: St. Louis Browns (1933)

Allen Sutton Sothoron (April 27, 1893 – June 17, 1939) was an American professional baseball player, coach and manager. As a player, he was a spitball pitcher who spent 11 years in the major leagues playing for the St. Louis Browns, Boston Red Sox, Cleveland Indians and the St. Louis Cardinals. Born in Bradford, Ohio, Sothoron threw and batted right-handed, stood 5 feet 11 inches (1.80 m) tall and weighed 182 pounds (83 kg). He attended Albright College and Juniata College.

Sportswriters frequently misspelled Sothoron's given name (as "Allan") and family name (as "Southern", among other variations) and some sources continue to refer to him as "Allan," although his personal documents show his preference for Allen.

== Career ==
Sothoron broke into the major leagues when the spitball was still legal. His best season came in 1919, when he posted a 20–13 record with a 2.20 earned run average for the Browns, finishing fifth in the American League in wins and ERA. After the spitball was outlawed following the 1919 campaign, Sothoron at first was not permitted to throw it, then in mid-1920 he was added to a list of 17 spitballers in the majors who were allowed to continue using the banned pitch. But he was never able to match his 1919 numbers. His pitching career ended in St. Louis with the National League Cardinals, where he played for his first MLB manager, Branch Rickey, and led the NL in shutouts with four in 1924, despite a mediocre 10–16 (3.57) record. During his MLB career, he appeared in 264 games pitched, and allowed 1,583 hits and 596 bases on balls in 1,582 1/3 innings pitched. He struck out 576 and hurled 102 complete games.

In 1921, sportswriter Bugs Baer came up with this immortal quip: "Allen S. Sothoron pitched his initials off yesterday."

After his playing days, Sothoron managed in minor league baseball, coached for the Cardinals (1927), Boston Braves (1928), and Browns (1932–1933), and with the 1933 Browns he served a brief, eight-game managerial stint after the dismissal of Bill Killefer. After compiling a win–loss record of 2–6 between July 19 and July 27, he was replaced with hometown favorite Rogers Hornsby.

Sothoron died in St. Louis at age 46 in the middle of the 1939 season after a series of illnesses. He is interred at Woodlawn Cemetery in the Bronx, New York City.

== Managerial record ==
Team	Year	Regular season					Postseason			
Team	Year	Games	Won	Lost	Win %	Finish	Won	Lost	Win %	Result
SLB	1933	8	2	6	.250	interim	–	–	–	–
Total		8	2	6	.250		0	0	–	
