= Bernie Friberg =

American baseball player (1899–1958)

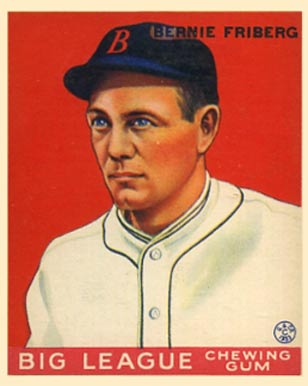
- Utility player
- Born: August 18, 1899; Manchester, New Hampshire, U.S.
- Died: December 8, 1958 (aged 59); Lynn, Massachusetts, U.S.
- Batted: Right Threw: Right

MLB debut
- August 20, 1919, for the Chicago Cubs

Last MLB appearance
- June 27, 1933, for the Boston Red Sox

MLB statistics
- Batting average: .281
- Home runs: 38
- Runs batted in: 471
- Stats at Baseball Reference

Teams
- Chicago Cubs (1919–1925); Philadelphia Phillies (1925–1932); Boston Red Sox (1933)

Gustaf Bernhard Friberg (August 18, 1899 – December 8, 1958) was an American utility player for the Chicago Cubs (1919–20 and 1922–25), Philadelphia Phillies (1925–32) and Boston Red Sox (1933). He attended Worcester Academy.

Friberg finished 18th in voting for the 1929 National League MVP Award for playing in 128 games and having 455 at bats, 74 runs scored, 137 hits, 21 doubles, 10 triples, 7 home Runs, 55 runs batted in (RBI), a .301 batting average, a .370 on-base percentage (OBP) and a .437 slugging percentage (SLG).

In 14 seasons, he played in 1,299 games and had 4,169 at bats, 544 runs scored, 1,170 hits, 181 doubles, 44 triples, 38 home runs, 471 RBI, 51 stolen bases, 471 walks, a .281 batting average, .356 OBP and .373 SLG.

He died in Lynn, Massachusetts at the age of 59.
