= Johnny Oulliber =

American baseball player (1911–1980)

John Andrew Oulliber (February 24, 1911 – December 26, 1980) was a Major League Baseball outfielder who played for one season, who later became a banker. He played in 22 games for the Cleveland Indians during the 1933 Cleveland Indians season. He later became president of First Commerce Corporation, a bank in New Orleans.

Oulliber posted a .267 batting average (20-for-75) with 9 runs and 3 RBI. He handled 25 total chances in the outfield without an error for a 1.000 fielding percentage.
