= Freddie Muller =

American baseball player (1907–1976)

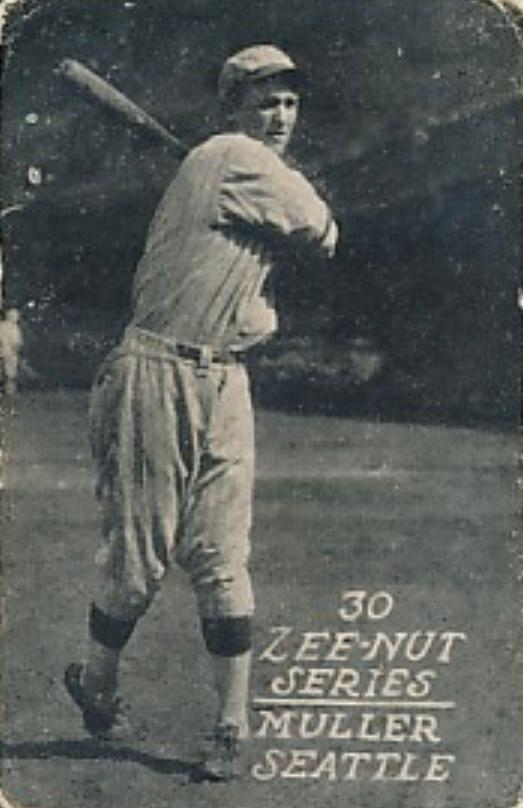
- Second baseman
- Born: December 21, 1907; Newark, California
- Died: October 20, 1976 (aged 68); Davis, California
- Batted: Right Threw: Right

MLB debut
- July 8, 1933, for the Boston Red Sox

Last MLB appearance
- May 13, 1934, for the Boston Red Sox

MLB statistics
- Batting average: .184
- Home runs: 0
- Runs batted in: 3
- Stats at Baseball Reference

Teams
- Boston Red Sox (1933–1934)

Frederick William Muller (December 21, 1907 – October 20, 1976) was an infielder in Major League Baseball. Listed at 5 ft 10 in (1.78 m), 170 lb., Muller batted and threw right-handed. He was born in Newark, California, son of German immigrants George and Mary Muller.

Muller was a utility player who played for the Boston Red Sox in parts of two seasons. Used as a backup second baseman for Johnny Hodapp (1933) and Bill Cissell (1934), Muller hit a .184 batting average (9-for-49) with seven runs and three RBI in 17 games, including one double, one triple, and one stolen base with no home runs.

Upon retiring, Muller moved to Davis, California and became a farmer. He died there at the age of 68.

== See also ==
- 1933 Boston Red Sox season
- 1934 Boston Red Sox season
