= 1933 New York Yankees season =

Season for the Major League Baseball team the New York Yankees

1933 New York Yankees
- League: American League
- Ballpark: Yankee Stadium
- City: New York City, New York
- Record: 91–59 (.607)
- League place: 2nd
- Owners: Jacob Ruppert
- General managers: Ed Barrow
- Managers: Joe McCarthy (third season)

The 1933 New York Yankees season was the team's 31st season. The team finished with a record of 91–59–2 (.607), finishing 7 games behind the Washington Senators. New York was managed by Joe McCarthy; this was his third season with the team. The Yankees played their home games at Yankee Stadium.

For the fourth straight season, the Yankees fielded nine players who would eventually be enshrined in the Hall of Fame (Earle Combs, Bill Dickey, Lou Gehrig, Lefty Gomez, Tony Lazzeri, Herb Pennock, Red Ruffing, Babe Ruth, and Joe Sewell). This is the most all time, tied with the previous year's team as well as the 1930 and 1931 Yankees teams. The same nine Hall of Famers played for the 1931, 1932, and 1933 teams, with the 1930 team differing only by not having Joe Sewell and instead featuring Waite Hoyt.

== Regular season ==
=== Season standings ===
American League
Team	W	L	Pct.	GB	Home	Road
Washington Senators	99	53	.651	—	46‍–‍30	53‍–‍23
New York Yankees	91	59	.607	7	51‍–‍23	40‍–‍36
Philadelphia Athletics	79	72	.523	19½	46‍–‍29	33‍–‍43
Cleveland Indians	75	76	.497	23½	45‍–‍32	30‍–‍44
Detroit Tigers	75	79	.487	25	43‍–‍35	32‍–‍44
Chicago White Sox	67	83	.447	31	35‍–‍41	32‍–‍42
Boston Red Sox	63	86	.423	34½	32‍–‍40	31‍–‍46
St. Louis Browns	55	96	.364	43½	30‍–‍46	25‍–‍50

=== Record vs. opponents ===
1933 American League record Sources:
Team	BOS	CWS	CLE	DET	NYY	PHA	SLB	WSH
Boston	—	11–7	6–16	11–11	8–14	14–8	9–13	4–17
Chicago	7–11	—	9–13	10–12	7–15–1	12–10	15–7	7–15
Cleveland	16–6	13–9	—	10–12	7–13	6–16	15–7	8–13
Detroit	11–11	12–10	12–10	—	7–15	11–11	14–8–1	8–14
New York	14–8	15–7–1	13–7	15–7	—	12–9	14–7–1	8–14
Philadelphia	8–14	10–12	16–6	11–11	9–12	—	14–6	11–11–1
St. Louis	13–9	7–15	7–15	8–14–1	7–14–1	6–14	—	7–15
Washington	17–4	15–7	13–8	14–8	14–8	11–11–1	15–7	—

=== Roster ===
1933 New York Yankees
Roster
Pitchers: 18 Johnny Allen; 33 Pete Appleton; 20 Don Brennan; 19 Jumbo Brown; 33 Charlie Devens; 11 Lefty Gomez; 17 Danny MacFayden; 16 Wilcy Moore; 12 Herb Pennock; 10 George Pipgras; 15 Red Ruffing; 26 George Uhle; 14 Russ Van Atta	Catchers: 8 Bill Dickey; 9,28 Joe Glenn; 9 Arndt Jorgens; 10 Tony Rensa; Infielders: 5 Frankie Crosetti; 22 Doc Farrell; 4 Lou Gehrig; 2 Lyn Lary; 7 Tony Lazzeri; 21 Joe Sewell; 24 Billy Werber	Outfielders: 25 Sammy Byrd; 6 Ben Chapman; 1 Earle Combs; 3 Babe Ruth; 27 Dixie Walker	Manager: -- Joe McCarthy; Coaches: 31 Jimmy Burke; 29 Art Fletcher; 30 Cy Perkins; 21 Joe Sewell

== Player stats ==
=== Batting ===
==== Starters by position ====
Note: Pos = Position; G = Games played; AB = At bats; H = Hits; Avg. = Batting average; HR = Home runs; RBI = Runs batted in

Pos	Player	G	AB	H	Avg.	HR	RBI
C	Bill Dickey	130	478	152	.318	14	97
1B	Lou Gehrig	152	593	198	.334	32	140
2B	Tony Lazzeri	139	523	154	.294	18	104
SS	Frankie Crosetti	136	451	114	.253	9	60
3B	Joe Sewell	135	524	143	.273	2	54
OF	Babe Ruth	137	459	138	.301	34	104
OF	Earle Combs	122	417	125	.300	5	64
OF	Ben Chapman	147	565	176	.312	9	98

==== Other batters ====
Note: G = Games played; AB = At bats; H = Hits; Avg. = Batting average; HR = Home runs; RBI = Runs batted in

Player	G	AB	H	Avg.	HR	RBI
Dixie Walker	98	328	90	.274	15	51
Lyn Lary	52	127	28	.220	0	13
Samuel Byrd	85	107	30	.280	2	11
Doc Farrell	44	93	25	.269	0	6
Arndt Jorgens	21	50	11	.220	2	13
Tony Rensa	8	29	9	.310	0	3
Joe Glenn	5	21	3	.143	0	1
Billy Werber	3	2	0	.000	0	0

=== Pitching ===
==== Starting pitchers ====
Note: G = Games pitched; IP = Innings pitched; W = Wins; L = Losses; ERA = Earned run average; SO = Strikeouts

Player	G	IP	W	L	ERA	SO
Red Ruffing	35	235.0	9	14	3.91	122
Lefty Gomez	35	234.2	16	10	3.18	163
Johnny Allen	25	184.2	15	7	4.39	119
Russ Van Atta	26	157.0	12	4	4.18	76
Don Brennan	18	85.0	5	1	4.98	46
George Pipgras	4	33.0	2	2	3.27	14

==== Other pitchers ====
Note: G = Games pitched; IP = Innings pitched; W = Wins; L = Losses; ERA = Earned run average; SO = Strikeouts

Player	G	IP	W	L	ERA	SO
Danny MacFayden	25	90.1	3	2	5.88	28
Jumbo Brown	21	74.0	7	5	5.23	55
Herb Pennock	23	65.0	7	4	5.54	22
Charlie Devens	14	62.0	3	3	4.35	23
George Uhle	12	61.0	6	1	5.16	26

==== Relief pitchers ====
Note: G = Games pitched; W = Wins; L = Losses; SV = Saves; ERA = Earned run average; SO = Strikeouts

Player	G	W	L	SV	ERA	SO
Wilcy Moore	35	5	6	8	5.52	17
Pete Appleton	1	0	0	0	0.00	0

== Farm system ==
Level	Team	League	Manager
AA	Newark Bears	International League	Al Mamaux
A	Binghamton Triplets	New York–Pennsylvania League	Billy Meyer
B	Durham Bulls	Piedmont League	Bob Murray and Bill Skiff
C	Wheeling Stogies	Middle Atlantic League	Jack Sheehan

LEAGUE CHAMPIONS: Binghamton
