= Vic Frazier =

American baseball player (1904–1977)

- Pitcher
- Born: August 5, 1904; Ruston, Louisiana, U.S.
- Died: January 10, 1977 (aged 72); Jacksonville, Texas, U.S.
- Batted: Right Threw: Right

MLB debut
- April 18, 1931, for the Chicago White Sox

Last MLB appearance
- June 20, 1939, for the Chicago White Sox

MLB statistics
- Win–loss record: 23-38
- Earned run average: 5.77
- Strikeouts: 170
- Stats at Baseball Reference

Teams
- Chicago White Sox (1931–1933); Detroit Tigers (1933–1934); Boston Bees (1937); Chicago White Sox (1939)

Victor Patrick Frazier (August 5, 1904 – January 10, 1977) was an American professional baseball player. He played in Major League Baseball as a right-handed pitcher from 1931 to 1939 for the Chicago White Sox, Detroit Tigers, and Boston Bees. Listed at 6 ft 0 in (1.83 m), 182 lb (83 kg), Frazier batted and threw right-handed. He was born in Ruston, Louisiana.

In a six-season career, Frazier posted a 23–38 record with a 5.77 earned run average in 126 appearances, including 68 starts, 21 complete games, 25 games finished, four saves, 170 strikeouts, 291 walks, and 579 innings.

Frazier died in Jacksonville, Texas, at age 72.
