= Firpo Marberry =

American baseball player (1898–1976)

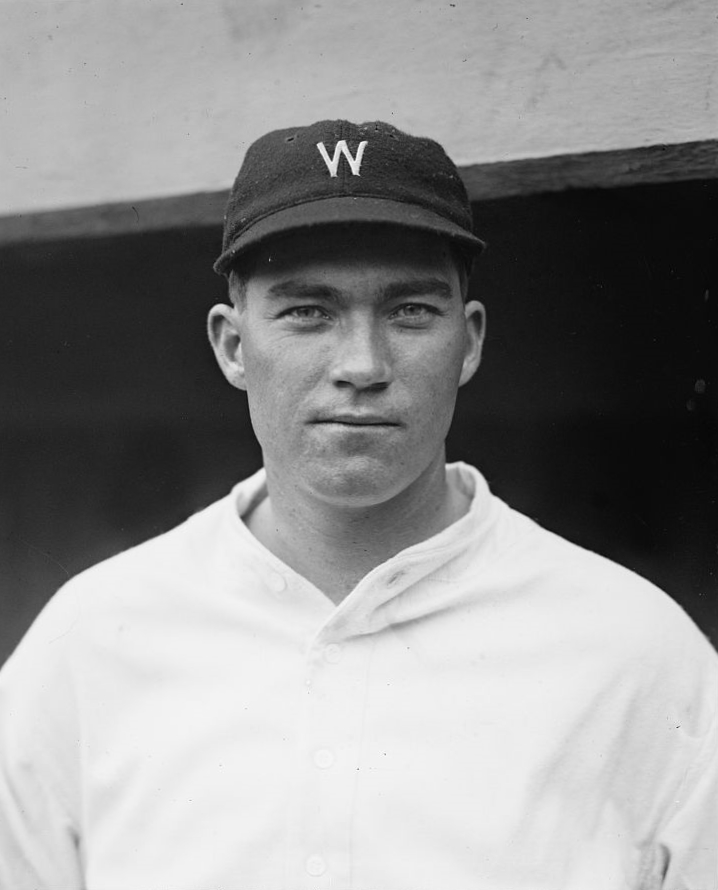
- Marberry with the Washington Senators in 1924
- Pitcher
- Born: November 30, 1898; Streetman, Texas, U.S.
- Died: June 30, 1976 (aged 77); Mexia, Texas, U.S.
- Batted: Right Threw: Right

MLB debut
- August 11, 1923, for the Washington Senators

Last MLB appearance
- June 10, 1936, for the Washington Senators

MLB statistics
- Win–loss record: 148–88
- Earned run average: 3.63
- Strikeouts: 822
- Saves: 101
- Stats at Baseball Reference

Teams
- Washington Senators (1923–1932); Detroit Tigers (1933–1935); New York Giants (1936); Washington Senators (1936)

Career highlights and awards
- World Series champion (1924)

Frederick "Firpo" Marberry (November 30, 1898 – June 30, 1976) was an American right-handed starting and relief pitcher in Major League Baseball from 1923 to 1936, most notably with the Washington Senators. The sport's first prominent reliever, he has been retroactively credited as having been the first pitcher to record 20 saves in a season, the first to make 50 relief appearances in a season or 300 in a career, and the only pitcher to lead the major leagues in saves six times. Since relief pitching was still seen as a lesser calling in a time when starters were only removed when clearly ineffective, Marberry also started 187 games in his career, posting a 94–52 record as a starter for a .644 winning percentage. He pitched in later years for the Detroit Tigers (1933–1935) and New York Giants (1936) before ending his career in Washington.

== Career overview ==
Born in Streetman, Texas, Marberry became well-known around the majors for the scowl he seemed to constantly have on his face that sometimes frightened batters; his appearance and demeanor reminded observers of boxer Luis Firpo, earning Marberry the nickname for which he often expressed disdain.

Marberry began his major league career with the Senators. When he first came up in August 1923, Marberry was effective in 44 2/3 innings pitched for the remainder of the season. He went 4–0 that year, proving himself ready for the pros. An 11–12 season with a 3.09 ERA came the year after, which might have seemed fairly average in that era were it not for Marberry's relief work, which saw him save 15 games – a new major league record, although it was not realized at the time. Marberry's role was crucial in helping the Senators reach the World Series for the first time in franchise history.

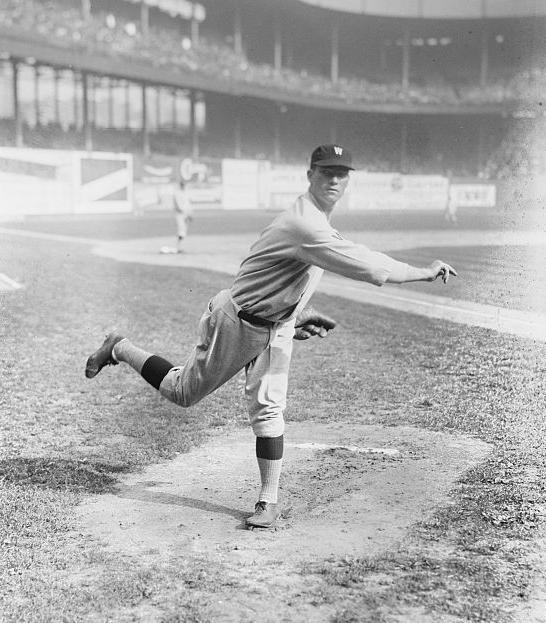
Firpo Marberry with the Washington Senators, during the 1924 World Series.

In the 1924 World Series against the Giants, Marberry was thrown into a difficult situation in his first appearance; after the Senators had taken a 3–1 lead going into the 9th inning of Game 2 at Griffith Stadium, starter Tom Zachary allowed the Giants to score twice to tie the game. Marberry came in to strike out Travis Jackson to end the inning, and the Senators scored in the bottom of the ninth to tie the Series; Zachary was credited with the win, although modern rules would have credited it to Marberry. The next day, Marberry started Game 3 at the Polo Grounds, but allowed two unearned runs in the second inning, was pulled for a pinch hitter in the top of the fourth while trailing 3–1, and was charged with the loss. He rebounded in Game 4 the next day, however, entering in the eighth inning with a 7–2 lead and closing out the victory to again tie the Series.

In Game 7 at Griffith Stadium, Marberry entered with two men on base and no one out in the sixth inning, leading 1–0. Although the Giants scored three times in the inning, two of the runs were unearned, and Marberry effectively shut the Giants down through top of the eighth, being pulled for a pinch hitter as the Senators tied the score in the bottom of the inning. Legendary Walter Johnson came in for the ninth inning, and redeemed himself after two losses in the Series by shutting out New York for four innings; the Senators scored in the bottom of the 12th to take what would be the only World Series title in Senators history. Marberry ended the Series with a 1.12 ERA in four games.

Marberry again saved 15 games in 1925 to tie his own record as the Senators won their second consecutive pennant. But although he allowed no runs in two appearances, Washington dropped the Series to the Pittsburgh Pirates, again going seven games. Marberry had an excellent year in 1926, breaking his own record again with 22 saves and posting a 3.00 ERA, the lowest of his career (besides his brief 1923 season) in an era which strongly favored hitters. He also took over the major league record for career saves, with 52. After two subpar seasons, he came back in 1929 to again lead the American League with 11 saves, while also winning a career-high 19 to finish fourth in the AL.

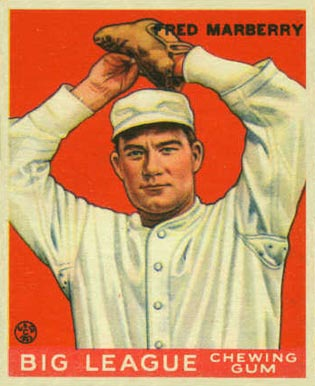
Marberry 1933 Goudey baseball card.

Marberry was never a full-time starter, but was often considered one of the few great pitchers who could go back and forth from the bullpen to being a starter, since there were so few of his era. In 1930 and 1931, Marberry was employed primarily as a starter, and posted an overall record of 31–9 for the two seasons. In 1931, showcasing his talents as both a starter (25 starts), and a reliever (20 appearances), he posted a 16–4 record with a 3.45 ERA (fifth in the league) and 88 strikeouts. While he recorded 11 complete games and one shutout as a starter, he also had seven saves, and finished 13th in MVP voting (Lefty Grove won the award).

After again leading the league in saves in 1932, for the fifth and last time, he was traded to Detroit on December 14. With the Tigers, Marberry posted a record of 31–16 in 1933. After appearing in only five games for Detroit in 1935, Marberry was offered a job as an AL umpire, and he did serve in that capacity for the remainder of the season, though never in a Washington game. He made a single relief appearance for the Giants in 1936 before ending his career on June 10 in Washington, D.C.

On May 6, 1934, Marberry allowed a record-tying four consecutive triples to the Boston Red Sox. The four hitters were Carl Reynolds, Moose Solters, Rick Ferrell, and Bucky Walters.

In a 14-season career, Marberry had a lifetime record of 148–88 with a 3.63 ERA in 551 games (187 starts), accumulating 86 complete games and seven shutouts. He struck out 822 batters in 2067 1/3 innings pitched. His career records of 364 relief appearances and 101 saves – both more than double the previous records – were surpassed by Jack Russell in 1940 and Johnny Murphy in 1946 respectively. The save was created as a pitching statistic in the 1960s, and later research was done to identify saves earned in the past.

As a hitter, Marberry posted a .192 batting average (128-for-668) with 60 runs, 21 doubles, 3 triples, one home run, 65 RBI and 22 bases on balls in 551 games. He finished his career with a .965 fielding percentage.

Later in life Marberry owned a car dealership in Mexia. On October 2, 1949, Marberry was in an automobile accident outside of Mexia, colliding with another car. The accident severed Marberry's left arm, which authorities discovered in the other vehicle. Marberry died of a stroke at age 77 in Mexia, Texas, and was buried in Birdston Cemetery near Streetman.

== Highlights ==
- Top 10 in the American League in wins, five times (1929, 1930, 1931, 1933, 1934)
- Top 6 in the league in ERA, four times (1924, 1929, 1931, 1933)
- Led the league in saves, five times (1924, 1925, 1926, 1929, 1932); in the top 10 four more times (1927, 1928, 1931, 1934)
- Led the league in games, six times (1924, 1925, 1926, 1928, 1929, 1932), and led the league in games finished, four times (1924, 1925, 1926, 1928)

== See also ==
- List of Major League Baseball annual saves leaders
- Major League Baseball titles leaders

Achievements
Preceded by Mordecai Brown	All-time saves leader 1926–1945	Succeeded by Johnny Murphy
