= Milt Bocek =

American baseball player (1912–2007)

- Left fielder
- Born: July 16, 1912; Chicago, Illinois, U.S.
- Died: April 29, 2007 (aged 94); Brookfield, Illinois, U.S.
- Batted: Right Threw: Right

MLB debut
- September 3, 1933, for the Chicago White Sox

Last MLB appearance
- August 2, 1934, for the Chicago White Sox

MLB statistics
- Batting average: .267
- Home runs: 1
- RBI: 6
- Stats at Baseball Reference

Teams
- Chicago White Sox (1933–1934)

Milton Francis Bocek (July 16, 1912 – April 29, 2007) was an American professional baseball outfielder. He played parts of two seasons for the Chicago White Sox of Major League Baseball (MLB). During his playing career, he was listed at 6 feet 1 inch (1.85 m) and 185 pounds (84 kg).

== Early life ==
Bocek was born in Chicago, Illinois, and was popularly known as "Beltin' Bo from Cicero". He graduated from Crane High School (Chicago) in Chicago and played college baseball at the University of Wisconsin–Madison.

== Professional career ==
While Bocek was a student at the University of Wisconsin–Madison, he became a fairly prominent summer amateur and semipro player in baseball and softball. Chicago White Sox manager Lew Fonseca noticed him and arranged a tryout at Comiskey Park, during which Bocek hit several balls into the upper deck. He signed with the White Sox in the second half of 1933, becoming the fifth-youngest player in Major League Baseball that season, and then spent the first part of the 1934 season with the team as well. Subsequently, he played several years in the minor league systems of the St. Louis Cardinals and the New York Yankees.

== Post-playing career ==
After the end of Bocek's playing career, he worked as a draftsman for Danly Machine Company and later at a family owned business, also serving in the United States Army during World War II. He was married to his wife Victoria for 58 years before her death in 2006, and they had three children and eight grandchildren. At the time of his death, he held the distinction of being the oldest living White Sox player. He died on April 29, 2007, in Brookfield, Illinois, after a brief illness. He is buried next to his wife at Queen of Heaven Cemetery in Hillside, Illinois.
