= Carl Fischer (baseball) =

American baseball player (1905–1963)

- Fischer with Washington Senators
- Pitcher
- Born: November 5, 1905; Medina, New York, U.S.
- Died: December 10, 1963 (aged 58); Medina, New York, U.S.
- Batted: Right Threw: Left

MLB debut
- July 19, 1930, for the Washington Senators

Last MLB appearance
- July 14, 1937, for the Washington Senators

MLB statistics
- Win–loss record: 46–50
- Earned run average: 4.63
- Strikeouts: 376
- Stats at Baseball Reference

Teams
- Washington Senators (1930–1932); St. Louis Browns (1932); Detroit Tigers (1933–1935); Chicago White Sox (1935); Cleveland Indians (1937); Washington Senators (1937)

Career highlights and awards
- World Series champion (1935)

Charles William "Carl" Fischer (November 5, 1905 – December 10, 1963) was an American professional baseball pitcher. He played seven years in Major League Baseball between 1930 and 1937. He played for the Washington Senators (1930–1932, 1937), St. Louis Browns (1932), Detroit Tigers (1933–1935), Chicago White Sox (1935), and Cleveland Indians (1937).

== Early life ==
Fischer was born in Medina, New York, in 1905 and attended Medina High School.

== Professional baseball ==
Fischer began his career in professional baseball in 1925 at age 19 with the Cambridge Canners of the Eastern Shore League. He spent parts of six seasons in the minor leagues, including stints with the Scranton Miners, Manchester Blue Sox, and Johnstown Johnnies. He was with the Newark Bears of the International League for three years from 1928 to 1930. He compiled an 18–13 record for the Bears in 1929.

Fischer played seven years in Major League Baseball between 1930 and 1937. He played for the Chicago White Sox, Washington Senators, Cleveland Indians, Detroit Tigers and St. Louis Browns. He appeared in 191 major league games, 105 as a starter, and compiled a 46–50 record with a 4.63 ERA and 376 strikeouts in 823 innings pitched.

Although his major league career ended in 1937, Fischer continued to play professional baseball for another 10 year in the minor leagues. He played for four years in the International League for the Baltimore Orioles from 1938 to 1939 and for the Toronto Maple Leafs from 1939 to 1941. He next played five years in the Pacific Coast League for the Seattle Rainiers from 1942 to 1946 and for the Portland Beavers in 1946. He concluded his playing career in 1947 with the Pensacola Fliers of the Southeastern League. He also served as manager of the Selma Cloverleafs of the Southeastern League for a portion of the 1947 season. He then coached a Junior Canadian Legion team in Kitchener, Ontario.

== Later years ==
In 1949, after retiring from baseball, Fischer purchased a newsroom and went into business in Albion, New York. He and his wife, Grace, lived in Medina, New York. Fischer died following a heart attack at his home in Medina in 1963 at age 58.
