= 1933 Cleveland Indians season =

1933 Cleveland Indians
- League: American League
- Ballpark: League Park; Cleveland Municipal Stadium
- City: Cleveland, Ohio
- Owners: Alva Bradley
- General managers: Billy Evans
- Managers: Roger Peckinpaugh, Walter Johnson
- Radio: WHK (Jack Graney)

The 1933 Cleveland Indians season was a season in American baseball. The team finished fourth in the American League with a record of 75–76, 23½ games behind the Washington Senators.

== Regular season ==
=== Season standings ===
American League
| Team | W | L | Pct. | GB | Home | Road |
|---|---|---|---|---|---|---|
| Washington Senators | 99 | 53 | .651 | — | 46‍–‍30 | 53‍–‍23 |
| New York Yankees | 91 | 59 | .607 | 7 | 51‍–‍23 | 40‍–‍36 |
| Philadelphia Athletics | 79 | 72 | .523 | 19½ | 46‍–‍29 | 33‍–‍43 |
| Cleveland Indians | 75 | 76 | .497 | 23½ | 45‍–‍32 | 30‍–‍44 |
| Detroit Tigers | 75 | 79 | .487 | 25 | 43‍–‍35 | 32‍–‍44 |
| Chicago White Sox | 67 | 83 | .447 | 31 | 35‍–‍41 | 32‍–‍42 |
| Boston Red Sox | 63 | 86 | .423 | 34½ | 32‍–‍40 | 31‍–‍46 |
| St. Louis Browns | 55 | 96 | .364 | 43½ | 30‍–‍46 | 25‍–‍50 |

=== Record vs. opponents ===
1933 American League record Sources:
| Team | BOS | CWS | CLE | DET | NYY | PHA | SLB | WSH |
|---|---|---|---|---|---|---|---|---|
| Boston | — | 11–7 | 6–16 | 11–11 | 8–14 | 14–8 | 9–13 | 4–17 |
| Chicago | 7–11 | — | 9–13 | 10–12 | 7–15–1 | 12–10 | 15–7 | 7–15 |
| Cleveland | 16–6 | 13–9 | — | 10–12 | 7–13 | 6–16 | 15–7 | 8–13 |
| Detroit | 11–11 | 12–10 | 12–10 | — | 7–15 | 11–11 | 14–8–1 | 8–14 |
| New York | 14–8 | 15–7–1 | 13–7 | 15–7 | — | 12–9 | 14–7–1 | 8–14 |
| Philadelphia | 8–14 | 10–12 | 16–6 | 11–11 | 9–12 | — | 14–6 | 11–11–1 |
| St. Louis | 13–9 | 7–15 | 7–15 | 8–14–1 | 7–14–1 | 6–14 | — | 7–15 |
| Washington | 17–4 | 15–7 | 13–8 | 14–8 | 14–8 | 11–11–1 | 15–7 | — |

=== Roster ===
1933 Cleveland Indians
Roster
| Pitchers: 17 Belve Bean; 16 Clint Brown; 15 Sarge Connally; 21 Howard Craghead; 14 Wes Ferrell; 18 Mel Harder; 19 Oral Hildebrand; 12 Willis Hudlin; 30 Thornton Lee; 33 Monte Pearson | Catchers: 9 Glenn Myatt; 11 Frankie Pytlak; 8 Roy Spencer; Infielders: 7 Harley Boss; 1 Johnny Burnett; 4 Bill Cissell; 25 Odell Hale; 5 Willie Kamm; 26 Bill Knickerbocker; 33 Ed Morgan; 21 Hal Trosky | Outfielders: 3 Earl Averill; 22 Milt Galatzer; 29 Johnny Oulliber; 2 Dick Porter; 27 Mike Powers; 6 Joe Vosmik | Manager: 10 Walter Johnson; 10 Roger Peckinpaugh; Coaches: 20 Bibb Falk; 20 Patsy Gharrity; 30 Earl Wolgamot |

== Player stats ==
=== Batting ===
==== Starters by position ====
Note: Pos = Position; G = Games played; AB = At bats; H = Hits; Avg. = Batting average; HR = Home runs; RBI = Runs batted in

| Pos | Player | G | AB | H | Avg. | HR | RBI |
|---|---|---|---|---|---|---|---|
| C | Frankie Pytlak | 80 | 248 | 77 | .310 | 2 | 33 |
| 1B | Harley Boss | 112 | 438 | 118 | .269 | 1 | 53 |
| 2B | Odell Hale | 98 | 351 | 97 | .276 | 10 | 64 |
| SS | Bill Knickerbocker | 80 | 279 | 63 | .226 | 2 | 32 |
| 3B | Willie Kamm | 133 | 447 | 126 | .282 | 1 | 47 |
| OF | Joe Vosmik | 119 | 438 | 115 | .263 | 4 | 56 |
| OF | Earl Averill | 151 | 599 | 180 | .301 | 11 | 92 |
| OF | Dick Porter | 132 | 499 | 133 | .267 | 0 | 41 |

==== Other batters ====
Note: G = Games played; AB = At bats; H = Hits; Avg. = Batting average; HR = Home runs; RBI = Runs batted in

| Player | G | AB | H | Avg. | HR | RBI |
|---|---|---|---|---|---|---|
| Bill Cissell | 112 | 409 | 94 | .230 | 6 | 33 |
| Johnny Burnett | 83 | 261 | 71 | .272 | 1 | 29 |
| Roy Spencer | 75 | 227 | 46 | .203 | 0 | 23 |
| Milt Galatzer | 57 | 160 | 38 | .238 | 1 | 17 |
| Ed Morgan | 39 | 121 | 32 | .264 | 1 | 13 |
| Glenn Myatt | 40 | 77 | 18 | .234 | 0 | 7 |
| Johnny Oulliber | 22 | 75 | 20 | .267 | 0 | 3 |
| Mike Powers | 24 | 47 | 13 | .277 | 0 | 2 |
| Hal Trosky | 11 | 44 | 13 | .295 | 1 | 8 |

=== Pitching ===
==== Starting pitchers ====
Note: G = Games pitched; IP = Innings pitched; W = Wins; L = Losses; ERA = Earned run average; SO = Strikeouts

| Player | G | IP | W | L | ERA | SO |
|---|---|---|---|---|---|---|
| Mel Harder | 43 | 253.0 | 15 | 17 | 2.95 | 81 |
| Oral Hildebrand | 36 | 220.1 | 16 | 11 | 3.76 | 90 |
| Wes Ferrell | 28 | 201.0 | 11 | 12 | 4.21 | 41 |
| Clint Brown | 33 | 185.0 | 11 | 12 | 3.41 | 47 |
| Monte Pearson | 19 | 135.1 | 10 | 5 | 2.33 | 54 |

==== Other pitchers ====
Note: G = Games pitched; IP = Innings pitched; W = Wins; L = Losses; ERA = Earned run average; SO = Strikeouts

| Player | G | IP | W | L | ERA | SO |
|---|---|---|---|---|---|---|
| Thornton Lee | 3 | 17.1 | 1 | 1 | 4.15 | 7 |

==== Relief pitchers ====
Note: G = Games pitched; W = Wins; L = Losses; SV = Saves; ERA = Earned run average; SO = Strikeouts

| Player | G | W | L | SV | ERA | SO |
|---|---|---|---|---|---|---|
| Sarge Connally | 41 | 5 | 3 | 1 | 4.89 | 30 |
| Willis Hudlin | 34 | 5 | 13 | 1 | 3.97 | 44 |
| Belve Bean | 27 | 1 | 2 | 0 | 5.25 | 41 |
| Howard Craghead | 11 | 0 | 0 | 0 | 6.23 | 2 |

== Awards and honors ==
All Star Game

Earl Averill, Outfielder

Wes Ferrell, Pitcher

Oral Hildebrand, Pitcher

== Farm system ==
| Level | Team | League | Manager |
|---|---|---|---|
| C | Zanesville Grays | Middle Atlantic League | Johnny Walker, Buzz Wetzel, Harry Layne and Bert Grimm |

LEAGUE CHAMPIONS: Zanesville
