= John Campbell (baseball) =

American baseball player (1907-1995)

- Pitcher
- Born: September 13, 1907; Washington, D.C., U.S.
- Died: April 24, 1995 (aged 87); Daytona Beach, Florida, U.S.
- Batted: Right Threw: Right

MLB debut
- July 23, 1933, for the Washington Senators

Last MLB appearance
- July 23, 1933, for the Washington Senators

MLB statistics
- Win–loss record: 0–0
- Earned run average: 0.00
- Strikeouts: 0
- Stats at Baseball Reference

Teams
- Washington Senators (1933)

John Millard Campbell (September 13, 1907 – April 24, 1995) was an American professional baseball pitcher. He played in Major League Baseball for one season (1933) with the Washington Senators. For his career, he appeared in one game and pitched one inning, allowing an unearned run.

An alumnus of the University of Alabama, he was born in Washington, D.C., and died in Daytona Beach, Florida at the age of 87.
