= Tom Oliver (baseball) =

American baseball player (1903–1988)

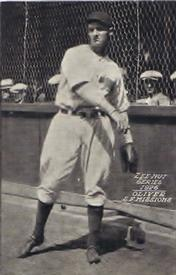
- Center fielder
- Born: January 15, 1903; Montgomery, Alabama, U.S.
- Died: February 26, 1988 (aged 85); Montgomery, Alabama, U.S.
- Batted: Right Threw: Right

MLB debut
- April 14, 1930, for the Boston Red Sox

Last MLB appearance
- September 23, 1933, for the Boston Red Sox

MLB statistics
- Batting average: .277
- Home runs: 0
- Runs batted in: 176
- Stats at Baseball Reference

Teams
- Boston Red Sox (1930–1933)

Thomas Noble Oliver (January 15, 1903 – February 26, 1988) was an American center fielder in Major League Baseball who played from 1930 through to 1933 for the Boston Red Sox. Listed at 6 feet (1.8 m) tall and 168 pounds (76 kg), Oliver batted and threw right-handed. He was born in Montgomery, Alabama.

Oliver was a slap hitter who rarely tried to drive the ball. As an outfielder, his arm and speed were already well above average, while his graceful style prompted baseball historian Fred Lieb to compare him to Joe DiMaggio and Tris Speaker.

In his rookie season for Boston, Oliver led the American League in games played (154), outs (472) and at-bats (646), while hitting a career-high .293 and leading his team in runs (86), hits (186) and singles (153). He enjoyed another good season in 1931, when he hit .276 and posted career-numbers in doubles (35) and RBI (75). He also led his team in singles (122), triples (5) and outs (436), and was considered in the American League MVP vote. The next two years he shared duties at center field with Dusty Cooke and Carl Reynolds.

In a four-season career, Oliver was a .277 hitter with 202 runs and 176 RBI in 514 games, including 191 doubles, 11 triples, 12 stolen bases, and a .316 on-base percentage without home runs. In 504 games at center field, he collected 1,425 outs with 45 assists and made 14 double plays, while committing 21 errors in 1,491 chances for a .986 fielding percentage.

Oliver holds the modern major league baseball record by going 1,931 at-bats without a home run in his career. He also holds the major league record for the most career RBIs from a 0-HR player in MLB history with 176.

Oliver coached for the Philadelphia Athletics and Baltimore Orioles from 1951 to 1954. He also scouted for the Athletics, Philadelphia Phillies and the Washington Senators/Minnesota Twins. He died at the age of 85 in Montgomery.

A member of an athletic family, Oliver was the uncle of William Oliver "Whitey" Overton who ran track in the 1948 Olympics and the great-uncle of William Oliver "Bill" Overton Jr. who played representative rugby for five separate years for the Texas Rugby Union and club rugby for the Austin Huns Rugby Football Club from 1975 to 1984.
