= Merv Shea =

American baseball player (1900–1953)

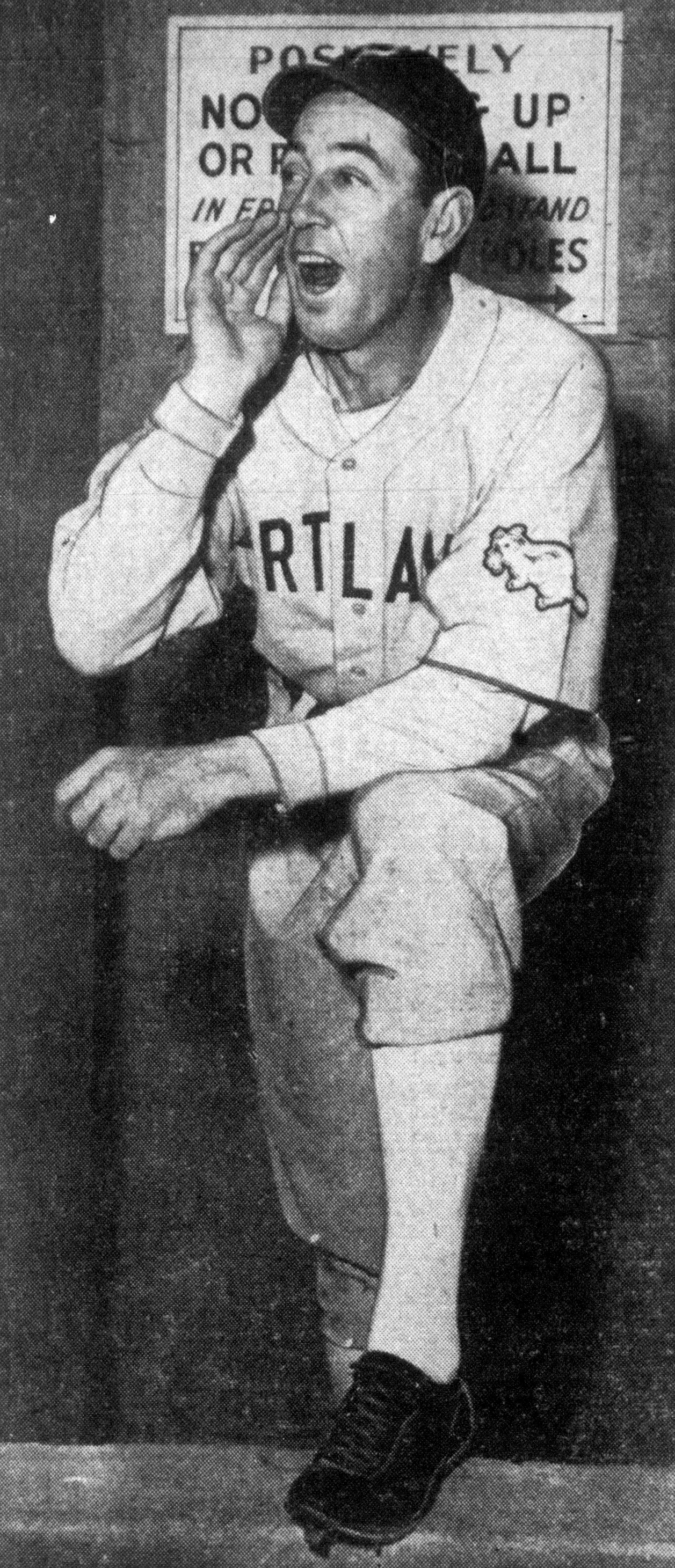
- Shea, circa 1943
- Catcher
- Born: September 5, 1900; San Francisco, California, U.S.
- Died: January 27, 1953 (aged 52); Sacramento, California, U.S.
- Batted: Right Threw: Right

MLB debut
- April 23, 1927, for the Detroit Tigers

Last MLB appearance
- August 19, 1944, for the Philadelphia Phillies

MLB statistics
- Batting average: .220
- Home runs: 5
- Runs batted in: 115
- Stats at Baseball Reference

Teams
- Detroit Tigers (1927–1929); Boston Red Sox (1933); St. Louis Browns (1933); Chicago White Sox (1934–1937); Brooklyn Dodgers (1938); Detroit Tigers (1939); Philadelphia Phillies (1944)

Mervyn John Shea (September 5, 1900 – January 27, 1953) was an American professional baseball catcher and coach. He played in Major League Baseball (MLB) for the Detroit Tigers, Boston Red Sox, St. Louis Browns, Chicago White Sox, Brooklyn Dodgers, and Philadelphia Phillies between 1927 and 1944. Born in San Francisco to Irish immigrants, at age five he survived the deadly 1906 San Francisco Earthquake, although the Shea family home was demolished in the temblor.

== Playing career ==
In his 11 big-league seasons, Shea played in 439 games and had 1,197 at bats, 105 runs scored, 263 hits, 39 doubles, seven triples, five home runs, 115 runs batted in, eight stolen bases and 189 walks. He compiled a .220 batting average, .327 on-base percentage, .277 slugging percentage, 331 total bases and 13 sacrifice hits.

In 1933, Shea tied the American League record for fielding percentage by a catcher (.996), with only 2 errors in 449 total chances. That season, which he split between the Red Sox and Browns, he reached career bests in games played (110) and hits (81). From 1934 to 1938 he was a second-string catcher, playing behind regulars such as Luke Sewell and Babe Phelps.

== Later life ==
She was a player-coach or coach for the Tigers (1939–42, serving on their 1940 American League championship edition), Philadelphia Phillies (1944–45, including his seven-game stint as a player at age 43 in 1944) and Chicago Cubs (1948–49). He managed the Portland Beavers of the Pacific Coast League (1943), and also spent several years scouting for the Cubs' organization. Shea played himself in the Jimmy Stewart movie The Stratton Story (1949).

He joined the coaching staff of the Sacramento Solons of the PCL in 1951, but was forced to retire due to a chronic liver abscess in his second season there. He died from the disease at the age of 52 in Sacramento.
