= Smead Jolley =

American baseball player (1902–1991)

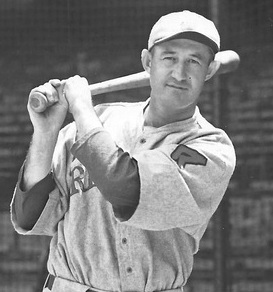
- Jolley, circa 1932–33
- Outfielder
- Born: January 14, 1902; Wesson, Arkansas, U.S.
- Died: November 17, 1991 (aged 89); Alameda, California, U.S.
- Batted: Left Threw: Right

MLB debut
- April 17, 1930, for the Chicago White Sox

Last MLB appearance
- October 1, 1933, for the Boston Red Sox

MLB statistics
- Batting average: .305
- Home runs: 46
- Runs batted in: 313
- Stats at Baseball Reference

Teams
- Chicago White Sox (1930–1932); Boston Red Sox (1932–1933)

Smead Powell Jolley (January 14, 1902 – November 17, 1991) was an American professional baseball outfielder. He played from 1922 to 1941, including four seasons in Major League Baseball (MLB) from 1930 to 1933. Jolley was considered a good hitter. His poor fielding kept him from having a longer major league career, but he spent eight seasons in the Pacific Coast League (PCL), the top minor league of that era. In 1928, he won the PCL Triple Crown. He was inducted into the Pacific Coast League Hall of Fame in 2003.

== Early minor league career ==
Jolley was born in Wesson, Arkansas, in 1902. He was 6'3" tall and weighed 210 pounds.

Jolley started his professional baseball career in 1922 with the Greenville Bucks of the class D Cotton States League. That season, he was a pitcher and had a 12–7 win–loss record in 180 innings pitched. He also had a .314 batting average. In 1923, Jolley was an outfielder and pitcher for the Shreveport Gassers of the class A Texas League. He batted .332 and had a 2–8 record in 111 innings pitched.

In 1924, Jolley was an outfielder and pitcher for the Texarkana Twins of the class D East Texas League. He batted .371 and had a 9–9 record in 184 innings pitched. That was the last season in which he spent significant time as a pitcher. In 1925, Jolley played for the Corsicana Oilers of the class D Texas Association and batted .362.

== San Francisco Seals ==
Jolley played for the San Francisco Seals of the class AA Pacific Coast League from 1926 to 1929. In 1926, he batted .346. In 1927, Jolley batted .397 with 33 home runs and 163 runs batted in (RBI). He led the PCL in batting average and RBI.

In 1928, Jolley batted .404 with 45 home runs and 188 RBI, leading the league in all three categories to win the Triple Crown. He also led the league with 309 hits, a .675 slugging percentage, and 516 total bases. The Seals won the PCL championship. In 1929, Jolley batted .387 with 35 home runs and 159 RBI.

== Major League Baseball ==
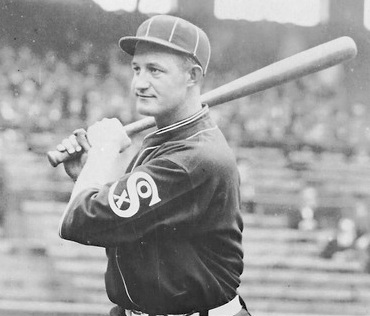
Jolley as a member of the Chicago White Sox, circa 1931.

In November 1929, the Seals traded Jolley to the Chicago White Sox of the American League (AL). In 1930, he batted .313 with 16 home runs and 116 RBI. In 1931, he batted .300 with 3 home runs and 28 RBI.

In April 1932, the White Sox traded Jolley to the AL's Boston Red Sox. Overall, he batted .312 with 18 home runs and 106 RBI in 1932. In 1933, he batted .282 with 9 home runs and 65 RBI.

== Later minor league career ==
In December 1933, the Red Sox traded Jolley to the AL's St. Louis Browns. The Browns then traded him to the PCL's Hollywood Stars. In 1934, Jolley batted .360. In 1935, he batted .372.

In 1936, Jolley played for the Albany Senators of the class AA International League. He led the league with a .373 batting average, 221 hits, 52 doubles, and 345 total bases. In 1937, Jolley played for the Nashville Volunteers of the class A1 Southern Association and batted .298.

Jolley joined the PCL's Oakland Oaks in 1938. He batted .350. In 1939, he batted .309.

In 1940, Jolley joined the Spokane Indians of the class B Western International League. He led the league with a .373 batting average, 224 hits, 56 doubles, and 365 total bases. Jolley finished his professional baseball career with the Indians in 1941.

== Legacy ==
Jolley had a .305 batting average, 521 hits, 46 home runs, and 313 RBI in the major leagues. He was considered a good hitter but a poor fielder, and his defense was too great of a liability to sustain an MLB career.

In the minor leagues, Jolley had over 2,700 hits and over 300 home runs. He spent 20 years in professional baseball, including eight in the PCL, the top minor league of that era. The league had a minimum salary of $5,000 per year, comparable to the two major leagues, and often paid their established players as well as the major leagues. The PCL was sometimes called "the third major league."

Jolley died in Alameda, California, in 1991. In 2003, he was inducted into the Pacific Coast League Hall of Fame.
