= Lloyd Brown (baseball) =

American baseball player (1904–1974)

- Pitcher
- Born: December 25, 1904; Beeville, Texas, U.S.
- Died: January 14, 1974 (aged 69); Opa-locka, Florida, U.S.
- Batted: Left Threw: Left

MLB debut
- July 17, 1925, for the Brooklyn Robins

Last MLB appearance
- August 10, 1940, for the Philadelphia Phillies

MLB statistics
- Win–loss record: 91–105
- Earned run average: 4.20
- Strikeouts: 510
- Stats at Baseball Reference

Teams
- Brooklyn Robins (1925); Washington Senators (1928–1932); St. Louis Browns (1933); Boston Red Sox (1933); Cleveland Indians (1934–1937); Philadelphia Phillies (1940)

Lloyd Andrew Brown [Gimpy] (December 25, 1904 – January 14, 1974) was an American professional baseball starting pitcher, who played in Major League Baseball (MLB) for five different teams between 1925 and 1940. Listed at 5 ft 9 in (1.75 m), 170 lb (77 kg), Brown batted and threw left-handed. He was born in Beeville, Texas.

Brown spent 30 years in professional baseball, including 12 major league seasons, but is best remembered as the pitcher who delivered the most home runs to Lou Gehrig, 15, including two grand slams. In between, Brown played or managed in Minor League Baseball (MiLB) during the same period and later became a respected scout.

Brown reached the big leagues in 1925 with the Brooklyn Robins, spending one year there, before moving to the Washington Senators (1928–32), St. Louis Browns (1933), Boston Red Sox (1933), Cleveland Indians (1934–37), and Philadelphia Phillies (1940). In between, he played or managed in the minor leagues during twelve seasons and later became a respected scout. Brown's most productive season came in 1930 for the poor-hitting Senators, when he posted career-best numbers with 16 wins, 15 complete games, and 258 innings pitched. In 1931, he won 15 games for Washington, collecting career-highs in earned run average (ERA) (3.20) and strikeouts (79), and again recorded 15 victories, in 1932.

As a hitter, Brown was above average. He posted a .192 batting average (106-for-552) with 54 runs, four home runs, 59 runs batted in (RBI), and 38 bases on balls in 404 games. Defensively, he recorded a .969 fielding percentage (which is 14 points higher than the league average at his position).

Brown later continued in MiLB, pitching from 1941 through 1953 and managing for ten teams between 1947 and 1960. He spent part of 1955 as a Baltimore Orioles' coach and scouted for the Orioles (1956–57), Phillies (1957–58, 1970–71), Senators (1961–66), and Seattle Pilots (1969) organizations. Brown won 202 games during 20 minor league seasons and had a 407–544 record as a manager, in 11 seasons (1946–53, 1955–56, 1960).

On January 14, 1974, Brown died in Opa-locka, Florida, at the age of 69.
