= 1933 Major League Baseball season =

1933 MLB season
- League: American League (AL); National League (NL)
- Sport: Baseball
- Duration: Regular season: April 12 – October 1, 1933; World Series: October 3–7, 1933
- Games: 154
- Teams: 16 (8 per league)

Regular season
- Season MVP: AL: Jimmie Foxx (PHA); NL: Carl Hubbell (NYG)
- AL champions: Washington Senators
- AL runners-up: New York Yankees
- NL champions: New York Giants
- NL runners-up: Pittsburgh Pirates

World Series
- Champions: New York Giants
- Runners-up: Washington Senators

MLB seasons
- ← 1932 1934 →

Locations of teams for the 1933 American League season
American League
Locations of teams for the 1932–1935 National League seasons
National League

The 1933 major league baseball season began on April 12, 1933. The regular season ended on October 1, with the New York Giants and Washington Senators as the regular season champions of the National League and American League, respectively. The postseason began with Game 1 of the 30th World Series on October 3 and ended with Game 5 on October 7. In the second iteration of this World Series matchup, the Giants defeated the Senators, four games to one, capturing their fourth championship in franchise history, since their previous in 1922. Going into the season, the defending World Series champions were the New York Yankees from the 1932 season.

The first All-Star Game was held on July 6 at Comiskey Park in Chicago, Illinois, home of the Chicago White Sox. The American League won, 4–2.

The season featured eight players hitting for the cycle, tied for the most of any single major league season. It was also the last season before the Senators and Philadelphia Athletics became perennial American League cellar-dwellers. The Senators would have only four more winning seasons in Washington, D.C., and would not return to the World Series until 1965 as the Minnesota Twins, while the Athletics would have only four winning seasons until moving to Oakland in 1968, winning only 40.2 percent of their games over 34 seasons.

== Schedule ==
The 1933 schedule consisted of 154 games for all teams in the American League and National League, each of which had eight teams. Each team was scheduled to play 22 games against the other seven teams of their respective league. This continued the format put in place since the 1904 season (except for 1919) and would be used until 1961 in the American League and 1962 in the National League.

Opening Day took place on April 12 and saw ten teams across both leagues play. The final day of the regular season was on October 1 and featured all sixteen teams, continuing the trend which began with the 1930 season. The World Series took place between October 3 and October 7.

== Rule change ==
The 1933 season saw a rule change regarding player limits; all teams were required to reach the 23 player limit by May 15 (previously, the required date was June 15). June 15 was retained as the day of the trade deadline.

== Teams ==
League	Team	City	Ballpark	Capacity	Manager
American League	Boston Red Sox	Boston, Massachusetts	Fenway Park	33,817	Marty McManus
American League	Chicago White Sox	Chicago, Illinois	Comiskey Park	52,000	Lew Fonseca
American League	Cleveland Indians	Cleveland, Ohio	Cleveland Stadium	78,811	Roger Peckinpaugh
American League	Cleveland Indians	Cleveland, Ohio	Cleveland Stadium	78,811	Bibb Falk
American League	Cleveland Indians	Cleveland, Ohio	Cleveland Stadium	78,811	Walter Johnson
American League	Detroit Tigers	Detroit, Michigan	Navin Field	30,000	Bucky Harris
American League	Detroit Tigers	Detroit, Michigan	Navin Field	30,000	Del Baker
American League	New York Yankees	New York, New York	Yankee Stadium	62,000	Joe McCarthy
American League	Philadelphia Athletics	Philadelphia, Pennsylvania	Shibe Park	33,000	Connie Mack
American League	St. Louis Browns	St. Louis, Missouri	Sportsman's Park	34,023	Bill Killefer
American League	St. Louis Browns	St. Louis, Missouri	Sportsman's Park	34,023	Allen Sothoron
American League	St. Louis Browns	St. Louis, Missouri	Sportsman's Park	34,023	Rogers Hornsby
American League	Washington Senators	Washington, D.C.	Griffith Stadium	32,000	Joe Cronin
National League	Boston Braves	Boston, Massachusetts	Braves Field	46,500	Bill McKechnie
National League	Brooklyn Dodgers	New York, New York	Ebbets Field	32,000	Max Carey
National League	Chicago Cubs	Chicago, Illinois	Wrigley Field	40,000	Charlie Grimm
National League	Cincinnati Reds	Cincinnati, Ohio	Redland Field	26,060	Donie Bush
National League	New York Giants	New York, New York	Polo Grounds	56,000	Bill Terry
National League	Philadelphia Phillies	Philadelphia, Pennsylvania	Baker Bowl	18,800	Burt Shotton
National League	Pittsburgh Pirates	Pittsburgh, Pennsylvania	Forbes Field	41,000	George Gibson
National League	St. Louis Cardinals	St. Louis, Missouri	Sportsman's Park	34,023	Gabby Street
National League	St. Louis Cardinals	St. Louis, Missouri	Sportsman's Park	34,023	Frankie Frisch

== Standings ==
=== American League ===
American League
Team	W	L	Pct.	GB	Home	Road
Washington Senators	99	53	.651	—	46‍–‍30	53‍–‍23
New York Yankees	91	59	.607	7	51‍–‍23	40‍–‍36
Philadelphia Athletics	79	72	.523	19½	46‍–‍29	33‍–‍43
Cleveland Indians	75	76	.497	23½	45‍–‍32	30‍–‍44
Detroit Tigers	75	79	.487	25	43‍–‍35	32‍–‍44
Chicago White Sox	67	83	.447	31	35‍–‍41	32‍–‍42
Boston Red Sox	63	86	.423	34½	32‍–‍40	31‍–‍46
St. Louis Browns	55	96	.364	43½	30‍–‍46	25‍–‍50

=== National League ===
National League
Team	W	L	Pct.	GB	Home	Road
New York Giants	91	61	.599	—	48‍–‍27	43‍–‍34
Pittsburgh Pirates	87	67	.565	5	50‍–‍27	37‍–‍40
Chicago Cubs	86	68	.558	6	56‍–‍23	30‍–‍45
Boston Braves	83	71	.539	9	45‍–‍31	38‍–‍40
St. Louis Cardinals	82	71	.536	9½	47‍–‍30	35‍–‍41
Brooklyn Dodgers	65	88	.425	26½	36‍–‍41	29‍–‍47
Philadelphia Phillies	60	92	.395	31	32‍–‍40	28‍–‍52
Cincinnati Reds	58	94	.382	33	37‍–‍42	21‍–‍52

=== Tie games ===
10 tie games (4 in AL, 6 in NL), which are not factored into winning percentage or games behind (and were often replayed again) occurred throughout the season.

==== American League ====
- Chicago White Sox, 1
- Detroit Tigers, 1
- New York Yankees, 2
- Philadelphia Athletics, 1
- St. Louis Browns, 2
- Washington Senators, 1

==== National League ====
- Boston Braves, 2
- Brooklyn Dodgers, 4
- Cincinnati Reds, 1
- New York Giants, 4
- St. Louis Cardinals, 1

== Postseason ==
The postseason began on October 3 and ended on October 7 with the New York Giants defeating the Washington Senators in the 1933 World Series in five games.

=== Bracket ===
World Series
AL	Washington Senators	1
NL	New York Giants	4

== Managerial changes ==
=== Off-season ===
Team	Former Manager	New Manager
Cincinnati Reds	Dan Howley	Donie Bush
Washington Senators	Walter Johnson	Joe Cronin

=== In-season ===
Team	Former Manager	New Manager
Cleveland Indians	Roger Peckinpaugh	Bibb Falk
Cleveland Indians	Bibb Falk	Walter Johnson
Detroit Tigers	Bucky Harris	Del Baker
St. Louis Browns	Bill Killefer	Allen Sothoron
St. Louis Browns	Allen Sothoron	Rogers Hornsby
St. Louis Cardinals	Gabby Street	Frankie Frisch

== League leaders ==
Any team shown in small text indicates a previous team a player was on during the season.

=== American League ===
Hitting leaders
Stat	Player	Total
AVG	Jimmie Foxx^{1} (PHA)	.356
OPS	Jimmie Foxx (PHA)	1.153
HR	Jimmie Foxx^{1} (PHA)	48
RBI	Jimmie Foxx^{1} (PHA)	163
R	Lou Gehrig (NYY)	138
H	Heinie Manush (WSH)	221
SB	Ben Chapman (NYY)	27

^{1} American League Triple Crown batting winner

Pitching leaders
Stat	Player	Total
W	Alvin Crowder (WSH); Lefty Grove (PHA)	24
L	Ted Lyons (CWS)	21
ERA	Mel Harder (CLE)	2.95
K	Lefty Gomez (NYY)	163
IP	Bump Hadley (SLB)	316.2
SV	Jack Russell (WSH)	13
WHIP	Firpo Marberry (DET)	1.229

=== National League ===
Hitting leaders
Stat	Player	Total
AVG	Chuck Klein^{2} (PHI)	.368
OPS	Chuck Klein (PHI)	1.025
HR	Chuck Klein^{2} (PHI)	28
RBI	Chuck Klein^{2} (PHI)	120
R	Pepper Martin (STL)	122
H	Chuck Klein (PHI)	223
SB	Pepper Martin (STL)	26

^{2} National League Triple Crown batting winner

Pitching leaders
Stat	Player	Total
W	Carl Hubbell (NYG)	23
L	Paul Derringer (CIN/STL)	27
ERA	Carl Hubbell (NYG)	1.66
K	Dizzy Dean (STL)	199
IP	Carl Hubbell (NYG)	308.2
SV	Phil Collins (PHI)	6
WHIP	Carl Hubbell (NYG)	0.982

== Milestones ==
=== Batters ===
==== Cycles ====
- Pepper Martin (STL):
  - Martin hit for his first cycle and seventh in franchise history, on May 5 against the Philadelphia Phillies.
- Chuck Klein (PHI):
  - Klein hit for his second cycle and fifth in franchise history, on May 26 against the St. Louis Cardinals.
- Arky Vaughan (PIT):
  - Vaughan hit for his first cycle and 10th in franchise history, on June 24 against the Brooklyn Dodgers.
- Mickey Cochrane (PHA):
  - Cochrane hit for his second cycle and fifth in franchise history, on August 2 against the New York Yankees.
- Pinky Higgins (PHA):
  - Higgins hit for his first cycle and sixth in franchise history, on August 6 against the Washington Senators.
- Jimmie Foxx (PHA):
  - Higgins hit for his first cycle and seventh in franchise history, on August 14 against the Cleveland Indians.
- Earl Averill (CLE):
  - Averill hit for his first cycle and second in franchise history, on August 17 against the Philadelphia Athletics.
- Babe Herman (CHC):
  - Herman hit for his third cycle and fourth in franchise history, on September 30 against the St. Louis Cardinals.

=== Miscellaneous ===
- Lou Gehrig (NYY):
  - Broke a Major League record for most consecutive games on August 17 by surpassing Everett Scott's record of 1,307.

== Awards and honors ==
=== Regular season ===
Baseball Writers' Association of America Awards
BBWAA Award	National League	American League
Most Valuable Player	Carl Hubbell (NYG)	Jimmie Foxx (PHA)

The Sporting News Awards
Award	National League	American League
Most Valuable Player	Carl Hubbell (NYG)	Jimmie Foxx (PHA)

== Home field attendance ==
Team name	Wins	%±	Home attendance	%±	Per game
New York Yankees	91	−15.0%	728,014	−24.3%	9,707
New York Giants	91	26.4%	604,471	24.7%	7,850
Chicago Cubs	86	−4.4%	594,112	−39.0%	7,520
Brooklyn Dodgers	65	−19.8%	526,815	−22.7%	6,585
Boston Braves	83	7.8%	517,803	2.0%	6,725
Washington Senators	99	6.5%	437,533	17.8%	5,757
Chicago White Sox	67	36.7%	397,789	70.6%	5,166
Cleveland Indians	75	−13.8%	387,936	−17.3%	5,038
Detroit Tigers	75	−1.3%	320,972	−19.2%	4,115
Philadelphia Athletics	79	−16.0%	297,138	−26.7%	3,910
Pittsburgh Pirates	87	1.2%	288,747	0.5%	3,750
Boston Red Sox	63	46.5%	268,715	47.5%	3,732
St. Louis Cardinals	82	13.9%	256,171	−8.3%	3,327
Cincinnati Reds	58	−3.3%	218,281	−38.8%	2,763
Philadelphia Phillies	60	−23.1%	156,421	−41.8%	2,173
St. Louis Browns	55	−12.7%	88,113	−21.7%	1,144

== Venues ==
The 1933 saw the Cleveland Indians play their first full season at Cleveland Stadium, though would not do so again for another 13 seasons. The team would return to League Park following the conclusion of the season after only playing at Cleveland Stadium since mid-1932, but would play an increasing part of their 1936 to 1946 seasons at the Stadium until they permanently left League Park starting with the 1947 season.

== See also ==
- 1933 in baseball (Events, Births, Deaths)
