= 1930 Cleveland Indians season =

1930 Cleveland Indians
- League: American League
- Ballpark: League Park
- City: Cleveland, Ohio
- Owners: Alva Bradley
- General managers: Billy Evans
- Managers: Roger Peckinpaugh
- Radio: WTAM (Tom Manning)

The 1930 Cleveland Indians season was a season in American baseball. The team finished fourth in the American League with a record of 81–73, 21 games behind the Philadelphia Athletics.

== Regular season ==
=== Season standings ===
American League
Team	W	L	Pct.	GB	Home	Road
Philadelphia Athletics	102	52	.662	—	58‍–‍18	44‍–‍34
Washington Senators	94	60	.610	8	56‍–‍21	38‍–‍39
New York Yankees	86	68	.558	16	47‍–‍29	39‍–‍39
Cleveland Indians	81	73	.526	21	44‍–‍33	37‍–‍40
Detroit Tigers	75	79	.487	27	45‍–‍33	30‍–‍46
St. Louis Browns	64	90	.416	38	38‍–‍40	26‍–‍50
Chicago White Sox	62	92	.403	40	34‍–‍44	28‍–‍48
Boston Red Sox	52	102	.338	50	30‍–‍46	22‍–‍56

=== Record vs. opponents ===
1930 American League record Sources:
Team	BOS	CWS	CLE	DET	NYY	PHA	SLB	WSH
Boston	—	13–9	7–15	8–14	6–16	4–18	9–13	5–17
Chicago	9–13	—	10–12	9–13	8–14	6–16	12–10	8–14
Cleveland	15–7	12–10	—	11–11	10–12	7–15	16–6	10–12
Detroit	14–8	13–9	11–11	—	9–13	7–15	11–11	10–12
New York	16–6	14–8	12–10	13–9	—	10–12	16–6	5–17
Philadelphia	18–4	16–6	15–7	15–7	12–10	—	16–6	10–12
St. Louis	13–9	10–12	6–16	11–11	6–16	6–16	—	12–10
Washington	17–5	14–8	12–10	12–10	17–5	12–10	10–12	—

=== Roster ===
1930 Cleveland Indians
Roster
Pitchers: 23 Pete Appleton; -- Les Barnhart; 22 Belve Bean; 16 Clint Brown; 14 Wes Ferrell; 24 Sal Gliatto; 18 Mel Harder; 21 Ken Holloway; 12 Willis Hudlin; 39 Roxie Lawson; 15 Jake Miller; 22 Joe Shaute; 17 Milt Shoffner	Catchers: 61 Grover Hartley; 9 Glenn Myatt; 8 Luke Sewell; 21 Joe Sprinz; Infielders: 39 Johnny Burnett; -- George Detore; 4 Lew Fonseca; 49 Ray Gardner; 10 Jonah Goldman; 6 Johnny Hodapp; 7 Carl Lind; 7 Ed Montague; 51 Ed Morgan; 2 Joe Sewell; -- Ralph Winegarner	Outfielders: 3 Earl Averill; 5 Bibb Falk; 11 Charlie Jamieson; 1 Dick Porter; 56 Bob Seeds; -- Joe Vosmik	Manager: Roger Peckinpaugh; Coaches: Grover Hartley; Mickey O'Neil; Howie Shanks

== Player stats ==
=== Batting ===
==== Starters by position ====
Note: Pos = Position; G = Games played; AB = At bats; H = Hits; Avg. = Batting average; HR = Home runs; RBI = Runs batted in

Pos	Player	G	AB	H	Avg.	HR	RBI
C	Luke Sewell	76	292	75	.257	1	43
1B	Ed Morgan	150	584	204	.349	26	136
2B	Johnny Hodapp	154	635	225	.354	9	121
SS	Jonah Goldman	111	306	74	.242	1	44
3B	Joe Sewell	109	353	102	.289	0	48
OF	Earl Averill	139	534	181	.339	19	119
OF	Dick Porter	119	480	168	.350	4	57
OF	Charlie Jamieson	103	366	110	.301	1	52

==== Other batters ====
Note: G = Games played; AB = At bats; H = Hits; Avg. = Batting average; HR = Home runs; RBI = Runs batted in

Player	G	AB	H	Avg.	HR	RBI
Bob Seeds	85	277	79	.285	3	32
Glenn Myatt	86	265	78	.294	2	37
Bibb Falk	82	191	62	.325	4	36
Ed Montague	58	179	47	.263	1	16
Johnny Burnett	54	170	53	.312	0	20
Lew Fonseca	40	129	36	.279	0	17
Carl Lind	24	69	17	.246	0	6
Joe Sprinz	17	45	8	.178	0	2
Joe Vosmik	9	26	6	.231	0	4
Ralph Winegarner	5	22	10	.455	0	2
Ray Gardner	33	13	1	.077	0	1
George Detore	3	12	2	.167	0	2
Grover Hartley	1	4	3	.750	0	1

=== Pitching ===
==== Starting pitchers ====
Note: G = Games pitched; IP = Innings pitched; W = Wins; L = Losses; ERA = Earned run average; SO = Strikeouts

Player	G	IP	W	L	ERA	SO
Wes Ferrell	43	296.2	25	13	3.31	143
Willis Hudlin	37	216.2	13	16	4.57	60
Clint Brown	35	213.2	11	13	4.97	54
Mel Harder	36	175.1	11	10	4.21	45

==== Other pitchers ====
Note: G = Games pitched; IP = Innings pitched; W = Wins; L = Losses; ERA = Earned run average; SO = Strikeouts

Player	G	IP	W	L	ERA	SO
Roxie Lawson	7	33.2	1	2	6.15	10
Ken Holloway	12	30.0	1	1	8.40	8
Sal Giatto	8	15.0	0	0	6.60	7
Len Barnhart	1	8.1	1	0	6.48	1
Joe Shaute	4	4.2	0	0	15.43	2

==== Relief pitchers ====
Note: G = Games pitched; W = Wins; L = Losses; SV = Saves; ERA = Earned run average; SO = Strikeouts

Player	G	W	L	SV	ERA	SO
Pete Appleton	39	8	7	1	4.02	45
Jake Miller	24	4	4	0	7.13	31
Milt Shoffner	24	3	4	0	7.97	17
Belve Bean	23	3	3	2	5.45	19

== Farm system ==
Level	Team	League	Manager
B	Terre Haute Tots	Illinois–Indiana–Iowa League	Earl Wolgamot
D	Frederick Warriors	Blue Ridge League	Bob Wells
