= 1931 Cleveland Indians season =

1931 Cleveland Indians
- League: American League
- Ballpark: League Park
- City: Cleveland, Ohio
- Owners: Alva Bradley
- General managers: Billy Evans
- Managers: Roger Peckinpaugh
- Radio: WTAM (Tom Manning)

The 1931 Cleveland Indians season was a season in American baseball. The team finished fourth in the American League with a record of 78–76, 30 games behind the Philadelphia Athletics.

== Regular season ==
=== Season standings ===
American League
Team	W	L	Pct.	GB	Home	Road
Philadelphia Athletics	107	45	.704	—	60‍–‍15	47‍–‍30
New York Yankees	94	59	.614	13½	51‍–‍25	43‍–‍34
Washington Senators	92	62	.597	16	55‍–‍22	37‍–‍40
Cleveland Indians	78	76	.506	30	45‍–‍31	33‍–‍45
St. Louis Browns	63	91	.409	45	39‍–‍38	24‍–‍53
Boston Red Sox	62	90	.408	45	39‍–‍40	23‍–‍50
Detroit Tigers	61	93	.396	47	36‍–‍41	25‍–‍52
Chicago White Sox	56	97	.366	51½	31‍–‍45	25‍–‍52

=== Record vs. opponents ===
1931 American League record Sources:
Team	BOS	CWS	CLE	DET	NYY	PHA	SLB	WSH
Boston	—	12–10–1	13–9	12–10	6–16	4–16	8–14	7–15
Chicago	10–12–1	—	7–15–1	11–11	6–15	3–19	12–10	7–15
Cleveland	9–13	15–7–1	—	13–9	13–9	4–18	16–6	8–14
Detroit	10–12	11–11	9–13	—	8–14	4–18	11–11	8–14
New York	16–6	15–6	9–13	14–8	—	11–11	16–6	13–9–1
Philadelphia	16–4	19–3	18–4	18–4	11–11	—	14–8	11–11–1
St. Louis	14–8	10–12	6–16	11–11	6–16	8–14	—	8–14
Washington	15–7	15–7	14–8	14–8	9–13–1	11–11–1	14–8	—

=== Roster ===
1931 Cleveland Indians
Roster
Pitchers: 23 Pete Appleton; 22 Belve Bean; 16 Clint Brown; 25 Sarge Connally; 21 Howard Craghead; 35 Pete Donohue; 14 Wes Ferrell; 18 Mel Harder; 34 Oral Hildebrand; 12 Willis Hudlin; 24 Roxie Lawson; 15 Jake Miller; 17 Milt Shoffner; 25 Fay Thomas	Catchers: 19 Moe Berg; 9 Glenn Myatt; 8 Luke Sewell; 11 Joe Sprinz; Infielders: 1 Johnny Burnett; 37 Bruce Connatser; 32 George Detore; 5 Lew Fonseca; 7 Jonah Goldman; 7 Odell Hale; 4 Johnny Hodapp; 35 Bill Hunnefield; 5 Willie Kamm; 35 Ed Montague; 33 Ed Morgan	Outfielders: 3 Earl Averill; 5 Bibb Falk; 28 Charlie Jamieson; 2 Dick Porter; 31 Bob Seeds; 6 Joe Vosmik	Manager: 10 Roger Peckinpaugh; Coaches: Grover Hartley; Howie Shanks; Earl Wolgamot

== Player stats ==
=== Batting ===
==== Starters by position ====
Note: Pos = Position; G = Games played; AB = At bats; H = Hits; Avg. = Batting average; HR = Home runs; RBI = Runs batted in

Pos	Player	G	AB	H	Avg.	HR	RBI
C	Luke Sewell	108	375	103	.275	1	53
1B	Ed Morgan	131	462	162	.351	11	86
2B	Johnny Hodapp	122	468	138	.295	2	56
SS	Ed Montague	64	193	55	.285	1	26
3B	Willie Kamm	114	410	121	.295	0	66
OF	Earl Averill	155	627	209	.333	32	143
OF	Dick Porter	114	414	129	.312	1	38
OF	Joe Vosmik	149	591	189	.320	7	117

==== Other batters ====
Note: G = Games played; AB = At bats; H = Hits; Avg. = Batting average; HR = Home runs; RBI = Runs batted in

Player	G	AB	H	Avg.	HR	RBI
Johnny Burnett	111	427	128	.300	1	52
Glenn Myatt	65	195	48	.246	1	29
Bibb Falk	79	161	49	.304	2	28
Bob Seeds	48	134	41	.306	1	10
Lew Fonseca	26	108	40	.370	1	14
Odell Hale	25	92	26	.283	1	5
Bill Hunnefield	21	71	17	.239	0	4
Jonah Goldman	30	62	8	.129	0	3
George Detore	30	56	15	.268	0	7
Bruce Connatser	12	49	14	.286	0	4
Charlie Jamieson	28	43	13	.302	0	4
Moe Berg	10	13	1	.077	0	0
Joe Sprinz	1	3	0	.000	0	0

=== Pitching ===
==== Starting pitchers ====
Note: G = Games pitched; IP = Innings pitched; W = Wins; L = Losses; ERA = Earned run average; SO = Strikeouts

Player	G	IP	W	L	ERA	SO
Wes Ferrell	40	276.1	22	12	3.75	123
Willis Hudlin	44	254.1	15	14	4.60	83
Clint Brown	39	233.1	11	15	4.71	50
Mel Harder	40	194.0	13	14	4.36	63

==== Other pitchers ====
Note: G = Games pitched; IP = Innings pitched; W = Wins; L = Losses; ERA = Earned run average; SO = Strikeouts

Player	G	IP	W	L	ERA	SO
Jake Miller	10	41.1	2	1	4.35	17
Milt Shoffner	12	41.0	2	3	7.24	12
Oral Hildebrand	5	26.2	2	1	4.39	6
Belve Bean	4	7.0	0	1	6.43	3
Howard Craghead	4	5.2	0	0	6.35	2
Pete Donohue	2	5.1	0	0	8.44	4

==== Relief pitchers ====
Note: G = Games pitched; W = Wins; L = Losses; SV = Saves; ERA = Earned run average; SO = Strikeouts

Player	G	W	L	SV	ERA	SO
Pete Appleton	29	4	4	2	4.63	25
Sarge Connally	17	5	5	1	4.20	37
Roxie Lawson	17	0	2	0	7.60	20
Fay Thomas	16	2	4	0	5.18	25

== Farm system ==
Level	Team	League	Manager
A	New Orleans Pelicans	Southern Association	Larry Gilbert
