= 1928 Cleveland Indians season =

1928 Cleveland Indians
- League: American League
- Ballpark: League Park
- City: Cleveland, Ohio
- Owners: Alva Bradley
- General managers: Billy Evans
- Managers: Roger Peckinpaugh
- Radio: WTAM (Tom Manning)

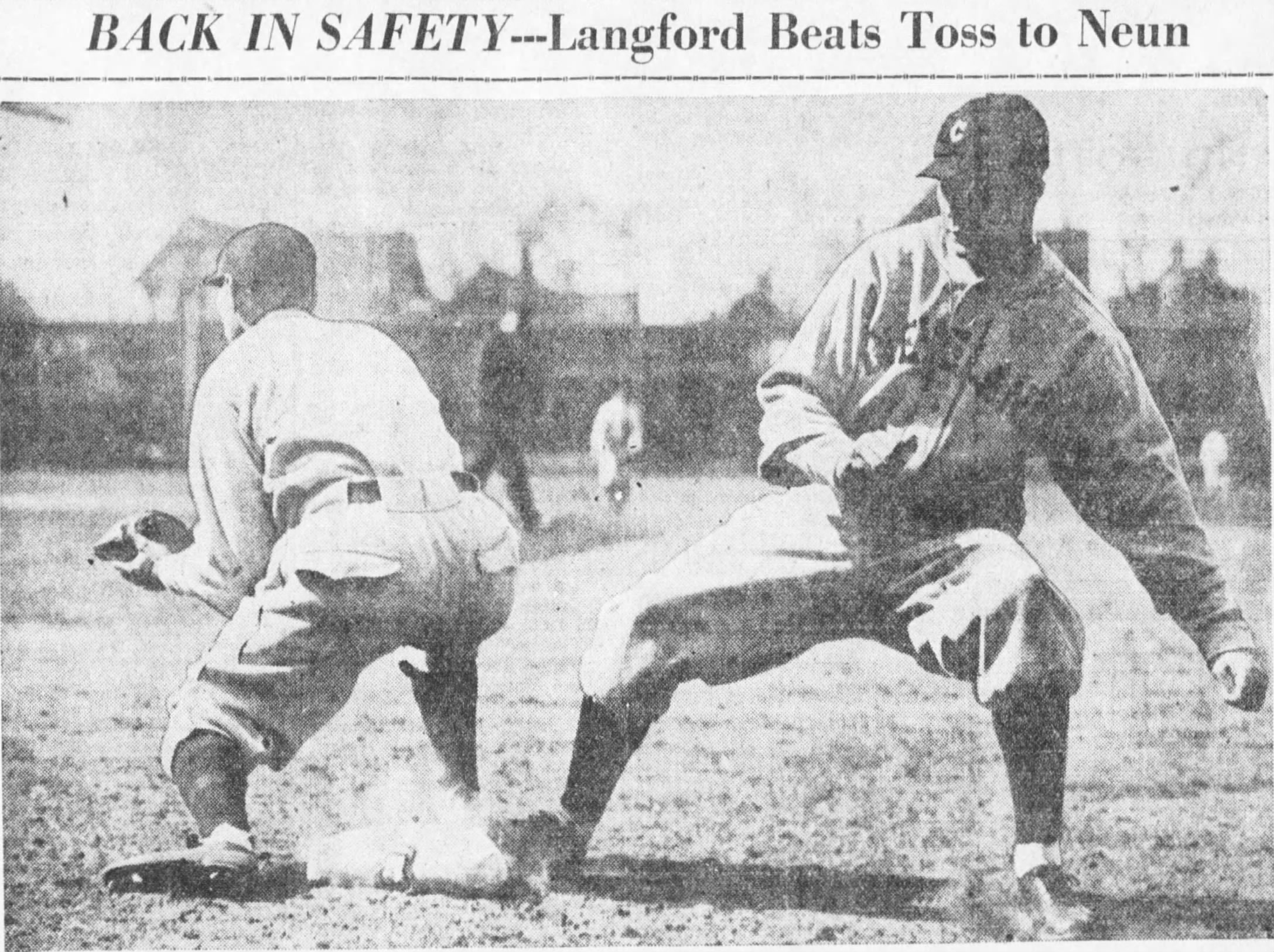
April 17, 1928 photograph from the baseball game between the Cleveland Indians and the Detroit Tigers

The 1928 Cleveland Indians season was a season in American baseball. The team finished seventh in the American League with a record of 62–92, 39 games behind the New York Yankees.

== Regular season ==
=== Season standings ===
American League
Team	W	L	Pct.	GB	Home	Road
New York Yankees	101	53	.656	—	52‍–‍25	49‍–‍28
Philadelphia Athletics	98	55	.641	2½	52‍–‍25	46‍–‍30
St. Louis Browns	82	72	.532	19	43‍–‍34	39‍–‍38
Washington Senators	75	79	.487	26	37‍–‍43	38‍–‍36
Chicago White Sox	72	82	.468	29	37‍–‍40	35‍–‍42
Detroit Tigers	68	86	.442	33	36‍–‍41	32‍–‍45
Cleveland Indians	62	92	.403	39	28‍–‍49	34‍–‍43
Boston Red Sox	57	96	.373	43½	26‍–‍47	31‍–‍49

=== Record vs. opponents ===
1928 American League record Sources:
Team	BOS	CWS	CLE	DET	NYY	PHA	SLB	WSH
Boston	—	10–12	9–13	7–15	6–16	3–18	9–13	13–9–1
Chicago	12–10	—	12–10–1	13–9	9–13	6–16	10–12	10–12
Cleveland	13–9	10–12–1	—	10–12	6–16	6–16	7–15	10–12
Detroit	15–7	9–13	12–10	—	7–15	8–14	9–13	8–14
New York	16–6	13–9	16–6	15–7	—	16–6	12–10	13–9
Philadelphia	18–3	16–6	16–6	14–8	6–16	—	16–6	12–10
St. Louis	13–9	12–10	15–7	13–9	10–12	6–16	—	13–9
Washington	9–13–1	12–10	12–10	14–8	9–13	10–12	9–13	—

=== Roster ===
1928 Cleveland Indians
Roster
Pitchers: Les Barnhart; Bill Bayne; Clint Brown; Jumbo Brown; Garland Buckeye; Hap Collard; Wes Ferrell; George Grant; Mel Harder; Willis Hudlin; Dutch Levsen; Johnny Miljus; Jake Miller; Jim Moore; Joe Shaute; George Uhle; Willie Underhill	Catchers: Chick Autry; Glenn Myatt; Luke Sewell; Infielders: Cecil Bolton; Johnny Burnett; George Burns; Lew Fonseca; Jonah Goldman; Johnny Hodapp; Carl Lind; Ed Montague; Ed Morgan; Art Reinholz; Joe Sewell; Al Van Camp; Aaron Ward	Outfielders: Bruce Caldwell; Red Dorman; George Gerken; Luther Harvel; Charlie Jamieson; Sam Langford; Homer Summa; Ollie Tucker; Other batters: Johnny Gill; Frank Wilson	Manager: Roger Peckinpaugh; Coaches: Grover Hartley; Howie Shanks

== Player stats ==
=== Batting ===
==== Starters by position ====
Note: Pos = Position; G = Games played; AB = At bats; H = Hits; Avg. = Batting average; HR = Home runs; RBI = Runs batted in

Pos	Player	G	AB	H	Avg.	HR	RBI
C	Luke Sewell	122	411	111	.270	3	52
1B	Lew Fonseca	75	263	86	.327	3	36
2B	Carl Lind	154	650	191	.294	1	54
SS	Joe Sewell	155	588	190	.323	4	70
3B	Johnny Hodapp	116	449	145	.323	2	73
OF	Homer Summa	134	504	143	.284	3	57
OF	Sam Langford	110	427	118	.276	4	50
OF	Charlie Jamieson	112	433	133	.307	1	37

==== Other batters ====
Note: G = Games played; AB = At bats; H = Hits; Avg. = Batting average; HR = Home runs; RBI = Runs batted in

Player	G	AB	H	Avg.	HR	RBI
Ed Morgan	76	265	83	.313	4	54
George Burns	82	209	52	.249	5	30
Luther Harvel	40	136	30	.221	0	12
Glenn Myatt	58	125	36	.288	1	15
George Gerken	38	115	26	.226	0	9
Red Dorman	25	77	28	.364	0	11
Chick Autry	22	60	18	.300	1	9
Ed Montague	32	51	12	.235	0	3
Ollie Tucker	14	47	6	.128	1	2
Bruce Caldwell	18	27	6	.222	0	3
Jonah Goldman	7	21	5	.238	0	2
Al Van Camp	5	17	4	.235	0	2
Cecil Bolton	4	13	2	.154	0	0
Johnny Burnett	3	10	5	.500	0	1
Aaron Ward	6	9	1	.111	0	0
Art Reinholz	2	3	1	.333	0	0
Johnny Gill	2	2	0	.000	0	0
Frank Wilson	2	1	0	.000	0	0

=== Pitching ===
==== Starting pitchers ====
Note: G = Games pitched; IP = Innings pitched; W = Wins; L = Losses; ERA = Earned run average; SO = Strikeouts

Player	G	IP	W	L	ERA	SO
Joe Shaute	36	253.2	13	17	4.04	81
Willis Hudlin	42	220.1	14	14	4.04	62
George Uhle	31	214.1	12	17	4.07	74
Jake Miller	25	158.0	8	9	4.44	37
George Grant	28	155.1	10	8	5.04	39
Wes Ferrell	2	16.0	0	2	2.25	4
Jim Moore	1	9.0	0	1	2.00	1

==== Other pitchers ====
Note: G = Games pitched; IP = Innings pitched; W = Wins; L = Losses; ERA = Earned run average; SO = Strikeouts

Player	G	IP	W	L	ERA	SO
Johnny Miljus	11	50.2	1	4	2.66	19
Dutch Levsen	11	41.1	0	3	5.44	7
Garland Buckeye	9	35.0	1	5	6.69	6
Willie Underhill	11	28.0	1	2	4.50	16
Clint Brown	2	11.0	0	1	4.91	2
Les Barnhart	2	9.0	0	1	7.00	1

==== Relief pitchers ====
Note: G = Games pitched; W = Wins; L = Losses; SV = Saves; ERA = Earned run average; SO = Strikeouts

Player	G	W	L	SV	ERA	SO
Bill Bayne	37	2	5	3	5.13	39
Mel Harder	23	0	2	1	6.61	15
Jumbo Brown	5	0	1	0	6.75	12
Hap Collard	1	0	0	0	2.25	1

== Farm system ==
Level	Team	League	Manager
B	Terre Haute Tots	Illinois–Indiana–Iowa League	Raymond Haley
D	Frederick Hustlers	Blue Ridge League	Joe Neptune and Henry Sherry
