= Red Dorman =

American baseball player (1900–1974)

- Outfielder
- Born: October 3, 1900; Jacksonville, Illinois
- Died: December 7, 1974 (aged 74); Anaheim, California
- Batted: Right Threw: Right

MLB debut
- August 21, 1928, for the Cleveland Indians

Last MLB appearance
- September 30, 1928, for the Cleveland Indians

MLB statistics
- Batting average: .364
- Hits: 28
- Stats at Baseball Reference

Teams
- Cleveland Indians (1928)

Charles Dwight "Red" Dorman (October 3, 1900 – December 7, 1974) was a Major League Baseball outfielder who played for one season. He played for the Cleveland Indians for 28 games during the 1928 Cleveland Indians season.

== Biography ==
Dorman began his professional baseball career with the Tyler Trojans of the D-Class Lone Star League. With the Trojans, he had a batting average of .408, 39 home runs, and 20 stolen bases. He led the league in home runs, batting average, and doubles, and as a result the Cleveland Indians brought him onto their major league roster. In his major league debut on August 21, he faced the 46-year-old Jack Quinn, and doubled in his first at-bat, drawing praise from Indians manager Roger Peckinpaugh. He spent the last month of the season as the team's center fielder, and finished the year with a .363 batting average.

In 1929, Dorman failed to make the team out of spring training, and was assigned to the New Orleans Pelicans of the Southern Association. On the season, he had a .301 batting average in 102 games for the Pelicans. He joined the Indians in mid-September along with Zeke Bonura and Mike Powers, but none of the three played a game for Cleveland that season.

In February 1930, Dorman's wife of 15 months died. He spent the season with the Indianapolis Indians and the Kansas City Blues, playing in a combined 105 games for the two teams. In 1931, Dorman spent the season with the Terre Haute Tots, finishing the season with a .283 batting average. He suffered an accident in 1931, and after the season never again played professionally.
