= Wes Ferrell =

American baseball player (1908–1976)

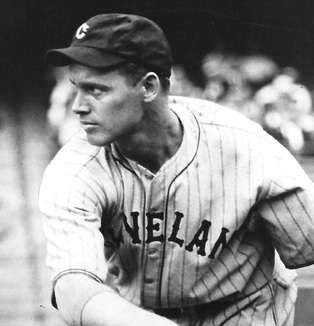
- Ferrell with the Cleveland Indians in 1931
- Pitcher
- Born: February 2, 1908; Greensboro, North Carolina, U.S.
- Died: December 9, 1976 (aged 68); Sarasota, Florida, U.S.
- Batted: Right Threw: Right

MLB debut
- September 9, 1927, for the Cleveland Indians

Last MLB appearance
- May 6, 1941, for the Boston Braves

MLB statistics
- Win–loss record: 193–128
- Earned run average: 4.04
- Strikeouts: 985
- Stats at Baseball Reference

Teams
- Cleveland Indians (1927–1933); Boston Red Sox (1934–1937); Washington Senators (1937–1938); New York Yankees (1938–1939); Brooklyn Dodgers (1940); Boston Braves (1941)

Career highlights and awards
- 2× All-Star (1933, 1937); AL wins leader (1935); Pitched a no-hitter on April 29, 1931; Cleveland Guardians Hall of Fame; Boston Red Sox Hall of Fame

Wesley Cheek Ferrell (February 2, 1908 – December 9, 1976) was an American professional baseball player. He played in Major League Baseball from 1927 through 1941. Primarily a starting pitcher, Ferrell played for the Cleveland Indians (1927–1933), Boston Red Sox (1934–1937), Washington Senators (1937–1938), New York Yankees (1938–1939), Brooklyn Dodgers (1940) and Boston Braves (1941). He batted and threw right-handed.

== Early life ==
Wesley Cheek Ferrell was born on February 2, 1908, in Greensboro, North Carolina, to Rufus Benjamin "Lonnie" and Alice Clara Carpenter. His father was employed by the Southern Railroad, and the family lived on a 160-acre dairy farm that was also used to grow crops such as hay and tobacco. Wes was the fifth of seven children who were all boys. They each played baseball for the local high school team, and two others went on to enjoy long careers in baseball: Rick, a Hall of Fame catcher, and George, an 18-year minor league veteran.

Wesley starred in baseball and basketball while playing for Guilford High School, and later for the Oak Ridge Military Academy in 1926. He was soon noticed by Bill Rapp, a scout for the Cleveland Indians, and in 1927 they, as well as the Detroit Tigers, offered him a contract while he was playing for a semi-professional team in East Douglas, Massachusetts. He chose the Indians, and joined the team for the remainder of the 1927 season. He made his Major League Baseball debut on September 9, 1927, pitching a single inning against the Boston Red Sox, and gave up three earned runs. Although, he initially made the Indians' roster in 1928, he was soon demoted to the Terre Haute Tots, of the Illinois–Indiana–Iowa League. He pitched well for the Tots, winning 20 games against eight losses, and had a 2.74 earned run average. In September, he was re-called to majors, and pitched two games before the season ended. He started both games, completed one of them, and while he pitched well, he received the loss in both.

== Major league career ==
=== Cleveland Indians ===
In 1929, he joined the Indians for good. Though only a spot-starter at first, he established himself as one of the best pitchers in the American League (AL) by season's end. He was noted to have had an excellent fastball, which he complemented with a good curveball and a deceptive changeup. He posted a 21–10 win–record with 100 strikeouts and a 3.60 earned run average (ERA). His 21 victories placed second in the league behind George Earnshaw's 24, and he finished in the top ten in strikeouts, earned run average, and saves. In 1930, he began the season as the Indians' number two starting pitcher behind Willis Hudlin, who made the team's opening day start. He quickly established himself as the team's ace by significantly improving his pitching performance. He increased his win total to 25 which finished second in the league, this time behind Lefty Grove's 28, and lowered his ERA to 3.31. His batting skills improved in 1930; his batting average jumped from .237 in 1929 to .297 in 1930.

Ferrell continued his excellence during the 1931 season. Although his ERA increased to 3.75, he led the league in complete games with 27 and collected another 22 wins. On April 29, he pitched a 9–0 no-hitter against the St. Louis Browns, striking out eight, while also hitting a home run and a double and amassing four runs batted in (RBIs). His brother Rick was the Browns' catcher. On May 8, he experienced pain in his right shoulder while warming up for a start against the Red Sox, and for the rest of the season his fastball became largely ineffective, forcing him to rely upon his other pitches. As stellar as his pitching statistics were, it was his hitting skills that were dramatically improving each season. Through 1930, he had hit just one home run but in 1931 he hit nine, breaking the previous home run record for pitchers of seven by Jack Stivetts in 1890. On August 31 he hit two home runs against the Chicago White Sox in 13–5 victory at Comiskey Park, the first of five times he would achieve the feat.

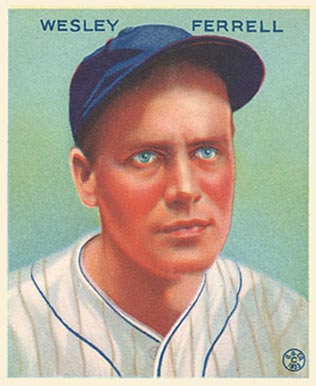
A 1933 Goudey trading card of Ferrell

Ferrell was an honest and outspoken individual, and his attitude began to sour during this period of his career. It was suspected that he had anxiety in regard to his shoulder injury, which caused him to angrily react to perceived bad calls by umpires, and teammates who made errors that negatively affected the game. On one occasion, Ferrell refused to be pulled from a game by his manager, and was suspended ten days without pay for insubordination. Because of his volatile temperament he was fined and suspended several times for refusing to leave a game, or for leaving it without permission. After being driven from the mound in one game, he punched himself in the face and began to slam his head into the wall. He had to be restrained by his team to stop him from continuing to hurt himself. Despite the pain in his shoulder, and worsening behavioral issues, he continued to be a durable and effective pitcher. In 1932, Ferrell posted his fourth consecutive 20-win season, with a record of 23–13, struck out 105, and had a 3.66 ERA.

The 1933 season began well for Ferrell; he had a 5–4 win–loss record and a 2.12 ERA on June 1, and was named to the inaugural Major League Baseball All-Star Game representing the American League. He was not called upon to play in the game, but his brother Rick was also selected to the team, and played the entire game. As the season progressed, however, his performance began to diminish. From July until the end of the season, he was largely ineffective as a pitcher, and his availability became infrequent. In response, his manager, Roger Peckinpaugh, tried playing him in left field. The experiment was deemed a failure, owing to Ferrell's lack of fielding skills. He had another great year as a batter, however, hitting seven home runs, and he compiled 26 RBIs and a .271 batting average. After a disappointing 11–12 record for the year, the Indians offered him what Ferrell regarded as an unacceptable contract offer, and he refused to sign. He also refused to join the team unless his contract demands were met. For his first 100 starts in his career, Ferrell went 63-32 (.663), with the winning percentage being among the highest in MLB history for first 100 starts. On May 25, 1934, the Indians traded him, along with Dick Porter, to the Boston Red Sox in exchange for Bob Weiland, Bob Seeds and $25,000 cash.

=== Boston Red Sox ===
By joining the Red Sox, Ferrell united with his brother Rick, who was their starting catcher. He made his debut for Boston on May 30 in relief, as were his next two appearances. He entered the starting rotation on June 10. On August 12, in front of a record crowd of 46,766 fans (with about 20,000 turned away), Babe Ruth made his farewell appearance as a New York Yankee in Boston. He singled and doubled against Ferrell, but Boston prevailed against Ruth and the New York Yankees by a score of 6–4. From that point until the end of the season, he was consistently effective, lowering his ERA from 4.64 on July 25, to a season-ending 3.63. He completed the 1934 season with a 14–5 record, and twice hit two home runs in a game. The first occurred against the St. Louis Browns on July 13, and the other on August 22 against the Chicago White Sox when he hit a game-tying home run in the eighth inning, then hit the game-winning, walk-off home run in tenth inning. Never known as a control pitcher, Ferrell's base on balls totals were usually high, including leading the league with 130 in 1931, but in 1934, his bases on balls per 9 innings pitched was the best in AL.

In 1935, Ferrell continued the success he had in the latter part of 1934, and arguably had his greatest season. He compiled league-leading totals with victories with 25, as well as innings pitched, games started, and games completed. He also finished within the leaders in shutouts, bases on balls per nine innings, and strikeouts. As a batter, he had a .347 batting average, and hit seven home runs, the third, and last, time he reached this plateau. On July 21, with the Red Sox trailing the Detroit Tigers 4–6 in the bottom of the ninth inning and two runners on the bases. Ferrell was sent in as a pinch hitter and hit a three-run walk-off home run, defeating the Tigers by the score of 7–6. The following day, Ferrell once again hit a walk-off home run, this time in a tied-game against the St. Louis Browns. His achievements during the 1935 season resulted in his second-place finish in the Most Valuable Player (MVP) voting, finishing behind Hank Greenberg.

Ferrell had another effective season in 1936, with a 20–15 record, while leading the league in games started, complete games, and inning pitched. His best games that season were two-hit shoutouts; one occurred on May 3 against the Tigers, and the other on June 21 against the Browns. This was his sixth and last time he achieved the 20-win mark during his major league career. His 1937 season began slow and he was unable to turn it around, by June 11, he had just three victories against six losses, and his ERA was a lofty 7.61. On June 11, the Ferrell brothers and Mel Almada were traded to the Washington Senators in exchange for Ben Chapman and Bobo Newsom.

=== Later career ===
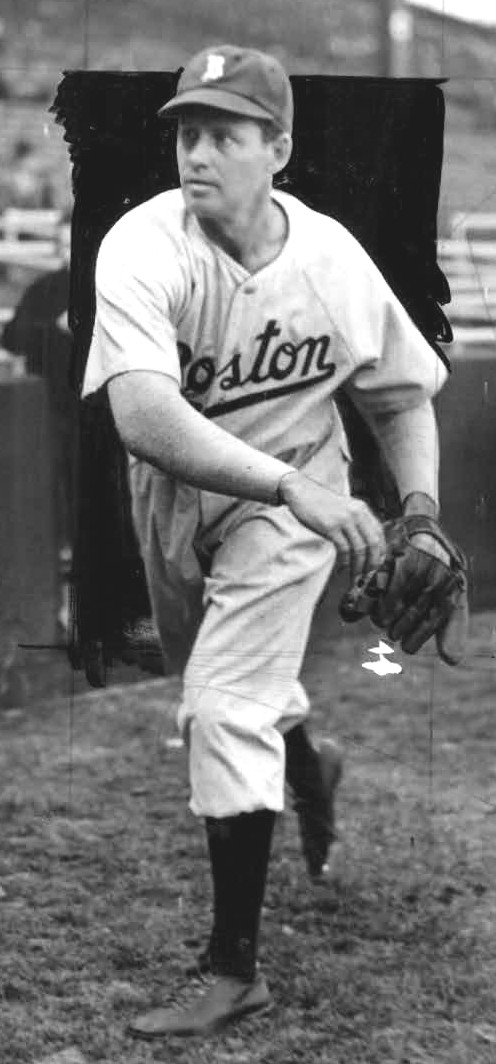
Ferrell during his last MLB season in 1941 with the Boston Braves.

Shortly after being traded to Washington, Wes won four of his first five starts, and was named to his second All-Star team. Joining him on the team was his brother Rick, and the game was played on July 7, although neither of the Ferrell brothers played. Although he had a lackluster pitching record of 14–19, he led the AL in innings and complete games for the third consecutive season. Ferrell remained with Washington in 1938, and leading the team with 13 victories, but due to his behavior and personality conflict with owner Clark Griffith, he was released from the team on August 12. Ferrell was quickly signed by the Yankees, and appeared in five games before the season ended. Over the following winter, he underwent arm surgery to remove bone chips from his elbow, but was unable to fully recover. He was released by the Yankees in May 1939, and went unsigned until January 1940, when he joined the Brooklyn Dodgers. He made just one relief appearance for the Dodgers before being released in May. He signed with the Boston Braves in February 1941, but was released after four games.

Ferrell finished his major-league career with a win–loss record of 193–128, 4.04 ERA, and 985 strikeouts in 2623 innings pitched. In 374 games pitched, he started 323, completed 227, and tossed 17 shutouts. In addition to his talents as a pitcher, he was also one of the best-hitting pitchers in major league history, setting records for pitchers; his nine home runs in 1931, and his career-total of 38 still stand. In total, he collected 329 hits, 57 doubles, and 12 triples; delivered 208 RBIs; scored 175 runs; and compiled a .446 slugging percentage, and a .280 batting average. Defensively, he was a better than average fielding pitcher, recording a .975 fielding percentage, which was 21 points higher than the league average at his position.

== Post-major league career ==
Even after the end of his major league career, Ferrell continued to play minor league ball. During these later years, he mainly played the outfield. After his release by the Braves in May 1941, he signed with the Leaksville-Draper-Spray Triplets of the class-D Bi-State League, where he batted .332 with 20 home runs in just 74 games. The following season, he joined the class-C Lynchburg Senators of the Virginia League, where he hit .361 with 31 homers in 123 games. He continued to play sporadically in the minors for several years before finally retiring for good after the 1949 season.

=== Later life and legacy ===
Wes Ferrell died at the age of 68 on December 9, 1976, in Sarasota, Florida, and is interred at New Garden Cemetery in Greensboro, North Carolina.

Arguments in favor of inducting Ferrell into the Baseball Hall of Fame include the factors which affected his numbers and lack of post-season success. In addition to the era in which he played, he didn't play for many good teams, and he pitched in hitter-friendly parks. In his book, The Bill James Historical Baseball Abstract, Bill James noted that Ferrell's high career ERA of 4.04 is not surprising due to the heavy-hitting era in which he played. The average AL ERA during his playing time was lofty 4.54. However, when Ferrell's ERA is adjusted with what he produced as a hitter, he was effectively 22% better than the league average. In this regard, he is comparable to other high-ERA pitchers that helped themselves by being a good batter such as Ted Lyons, a Hall of Fame member, and Carl Mays. He also has the record of most homeruns hit batting as a pitcher with 37 and has a career BA of .280, a career OBP of .351, a career SLG of .446, and an OPS of .797.

Although he, unlike his brother, has not been inducted into the Baseball Hall of Fame, in 1981, Lawrence Ritter and Donald Honig included him in their book The 100 Greatest Baseball Players of All Time, in celebration of his being not just a star pitcher but the best-hitting pitcher of all time—noting that Babe Ruth did most of his hitting when he was no longer a regular pitcher.

In February 2008, Ferrell was inducted to the Boston Red Sox Hall of Fame. He is the only pitcher since 1900 to win 20 games in his first four full major league seasons. He retired with the seventh highest winning percentage (.601) among pitchers with at least 300 AL decisions (for teams that never won the pennant) and also with the fourth highest fielding percentage (.975) in AL history.

== See also ==
- List of Major League Baseball annual wins leaders
- List of Major League Baseball all-time leaders in home runs by pitchers
- List of Major League Baseball no-hitters

Achievements
Preceded by Carl Hubbell	No-hitter pitcher April 29, 1931	Succeeded by Bobby Burke
