= Russ Miller =

American baseball player

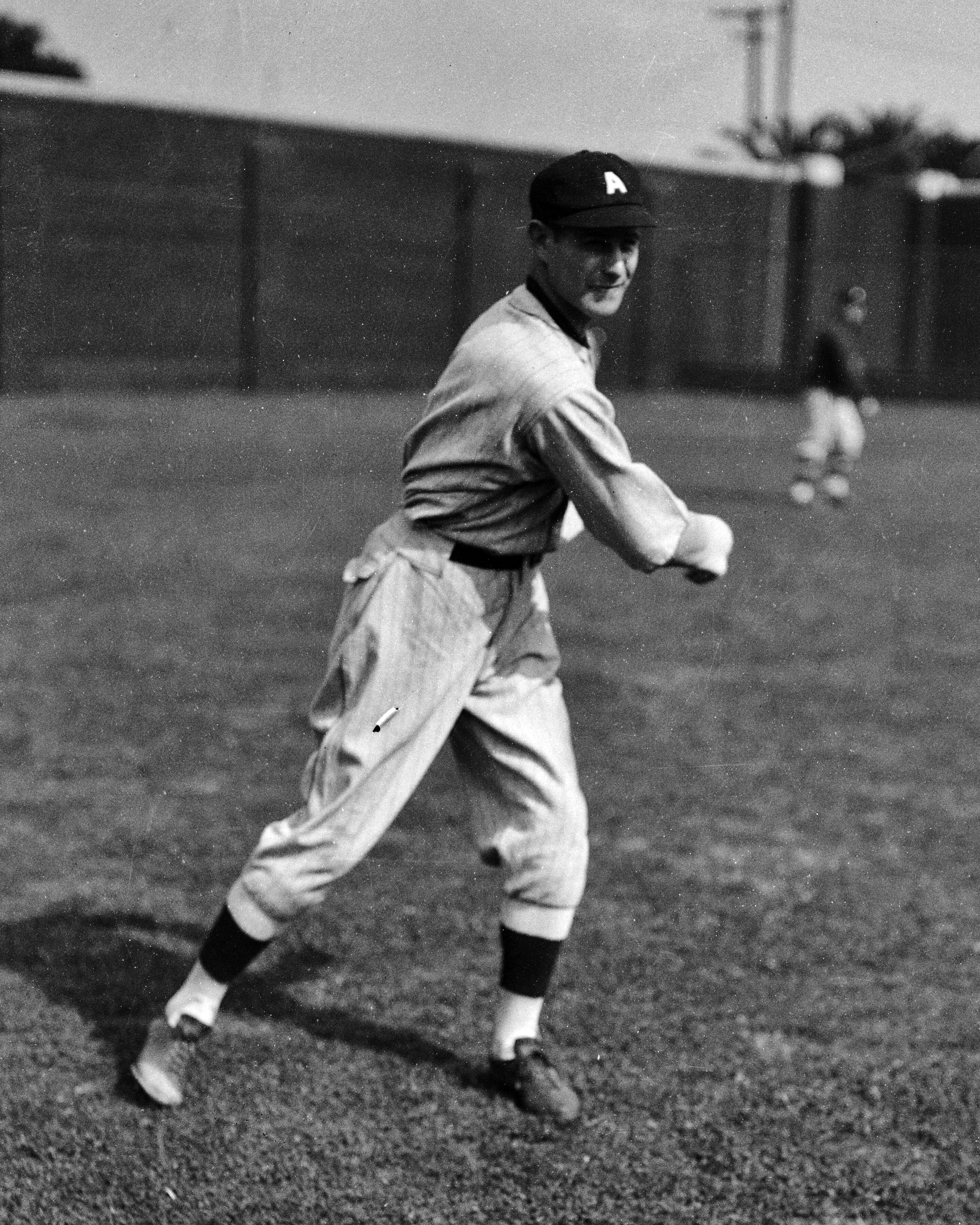
- Miller in 1929
- Pitcher
- Born: March 25, 1900; Etna, Ohio, US (Note: Baseball-Reference.com and Retrosheet list Miller's birthplace as Etna, Ohio; his draft registration card of February 1942 lists his birthplace as Wagram, Ohio; the contemporary newspaper account of his death gave his birthplace as Pataskala, Ohio.)
- Died: April 30, 1962 (aged 62); Bucyrus, Ohio, US
- Batted: Right Threw: Right

MLB debut
- September 24, 1927, for the Philadelphia Phillies

Last MLB appearance
- September 27, 1928, for the Philadelphia Phillies

MLB statistics
- Win–loss record: 1–13
- Earned run average: 5.40
- Strikeouts: 23
- Stats at Baseball Reference

Teams
- Philadelphia Phillies (1927–1928)

Russell Lewis Miller (March 25, 1900 – April 30, 1962) was an American professional baseball pitcher. He played in Major League Baseball (MLB) during 1927 and 1928 for the Philadelphia Phillies. Listed at 5 feet 11 inches (1.80 m) and 165 pounds (75 kg), he threw and batted right-handed.

== Baseball career ==
Miller's minor league baseball career spanned 1925 to 1932, as he compiled a 49–43 win–loss record pitching a total of 162 games for seven different teams. He spent time with farm teams of the St. Louis Cardinals in 1927 and Chicago Cubs in 1929.

Miller's major league career consisted of 35 appearances for the Philadelphia Phillies; two in 1927 (both starts) and 33 in 1928 (12 starts). His two appearances in 1927 came in late September; after losing his first start on September 24 to the Chicago Cubs, he won his second start on September 29 against the Boston Braves, pitching a complete game while allowing just one run. In 1928, Miller accrued an 0–12 record, taking losses both as a starting pitcher and as a reliever; he did earn two saves. Overall with the Phillies, Miller had a 1–13 record with 5.40 ERA and 23 strikeouts in 123 1/3 innings pitched.

== Personal life ==
Miller was born in Ohio in 1900. He was a younger brother of fellow major league pitcher J. Walter Miller (1898–1975); both played college baseball at Ohio State University. Miller's senior entry in the Ohio State yearbook noted that he was a member of Delta Tau Delta fraternity and that he had earned three varsity letters in baseball. In February 1942, he was working in agricultural extension for Ohio State, and he was later the agricultural agent for Crawford County, Ohio, a position he held for 28 years, until his death. Miller died in 1962 in Bucyrus, Ohio, and was interred in Reynoldsburg, Ohio. He was survived by his wife and two sons.
