= Sal Gliatto =

American baseball player (1902–1995)

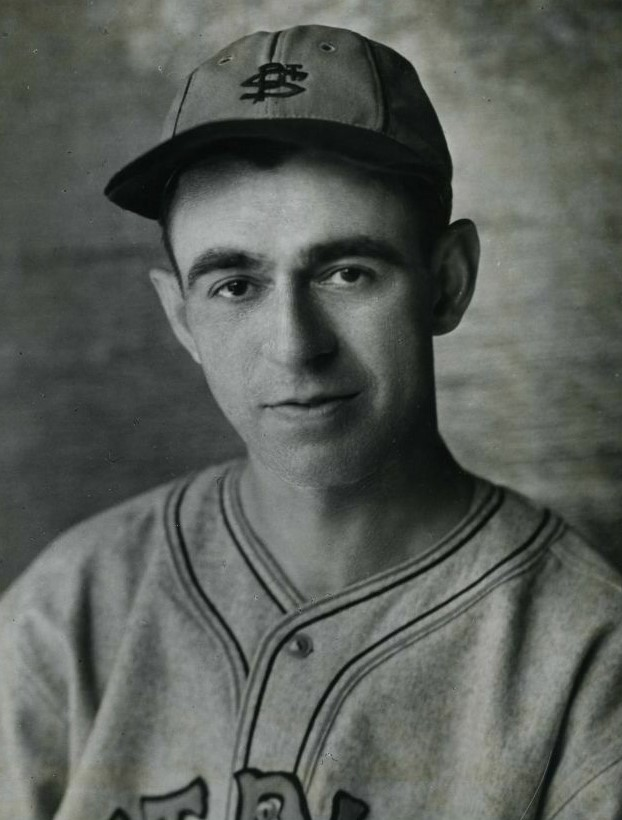
- Gliatto with the St. Paul Saints, circa 1937
- Pitcher
- Born: May 7, 1902; Chicago, Illinois
- Died: November 2, 1995 (aged 93); Tyler, Texas
- Batted: Both Threw: Right

MLB debut
- April 19, 1930, for the Cleveland Indians

Last MLB appearance
- June 28, 1930, for the Cleveland Indians

MLB statistics
- Win–loss record: 0-0
- Earned run average: 6.60
- Strikeouts: 7
- Stats at Baseball Reference

Teams
- Cleveland Indians (1930)

Salvador Michael Gliatto (May 7, 1902 – November 2, 1995) was a Major League Baseball pitcher who played for one season. He pitched in eight games for the Cleveland Indians during the 1930 Cleveland Indians season.
