= Jonah Goldman =

American baseball player (1906–1980)

- Infielder
- Born: August 29, 1906; New York, New York, U.S.
- Died: August 17, 1980 (aged 73); Palm Beach, Florida, U.S.
- Batted: Right Threw: Right

MLB debut
- September 22, 1928, for the Cleveland Indians

Last MLB appearance
- June 29, 1931, for the Cleveland Indians

MLB statistics
- Batting average: .224
- Home runs: 1
- Runs batted in: 49
- Stats at Baseball Reference

Teams
- Cleveland Indians (1928–1931)

Jonah John Goldman (August 29, 1906 – August 17, 1980) was an American Major League Baseball shortstop who played for three seasons. He played with the Cleveland Indians for seven games during the 1928 Cleveland Indians season, 111 games during the 1930 Cleveland Indians season, and 30 games during the 1931 Cleveland Indians season.

He was born in Brooklyn, New York, and was Jewish. He attended Erasmus Hall High School in Brooklyn, and Syracuse University in Syracuse, New York.
