= List of New York Yankees managers =

The New York Yankees are a professional baseball team based in New York City, New York in the borough of The Bronx. The New York Yankees are members of the American League (AL) East Division in Major League Baseball (MLB). The Yankees have won the World Series 27 times, more than any other MLB team. In baseball, the head coach of a team is called the manager. The duties of the team manager include team strategy and leadership on and off the field. Since starting to play as the Baltimore Orioles (no relationship to the current Baltimore Orioles team) in 1901, the team has employed 35 managers. The current manager is Aaron Boone, the current general manager is Brian Cashman and the current owner is Hal Steinbrenner, the son of George Steinbrenner, who first bought the Yankees in 1973.

The franchise's first manager was Hall of Famer John McGraw, who managed the team for one year and part of a second before becoming manager of the New York Giants. In 1903, the team moved from Baltimore to New York, where it was initially known as the New York Highlanders. Its first manager in New York was Clark Griffith, who managed the team from 1903 to 1908. Miller Huggins was the next manager to manage the team for more than three seasons. Huggins took over the managerial duties in 1918 and led the Yankees to six American League championships and three World Series titles until his death in 1929. Huggins won 1,067 regular season games with the Yankees, which ranks fourth all-time among Yankee managers.

Several other managers spent long tenures with the Yankees. Joe McCarthy managed the Yankees from 1931 until midway through the 1946 season. During his tenure, the Yankees won eight American League titles and won the World Series seven times. He won 1,460 regular season games with the Yankees and lost 867, both more than any other Yankee manager. Casey Stengel managed the team from 1949 until 1960, winning 10 American League championships, 7 World Series titles, and 1,149 games, which ranks third among Yankee managers. After Stengel was discharged, Ralph Houk managed the Yankees from 1961 through 1963, winning American League titles each season, and winning the World Series twice. He served a second term as Yankee manager from 1966 through 1973.

From 1974 until 1995, no Yankee managerial term lasted as long as three complete seasons. Joe Torre managed the Yankees from 1996 through 2007 and the team made the playoffs each season. He also won six American League championships and four World Series titles. His 1,173 regular season wins are second all-time among Yankees managers. He also has the most playoff appearances, playoff wins and playoff losses of any Yankee manager. Torre was named American League Manager of the Year twice, in 1996 and 1998. His predecessor, Buck Showalter, also was named Manager of the Year in 1994. Torre left after the 2007 season and was replaced by Joe Girardi, who managed the Yankees from 2008 to 2017 winning one American League championship and one World Series title.

Several managers have had multiple tenures with the Yankees. Billy Martin served five terms as Yankee manager. Before his death in 1989, Martin was rumored to be in line for a sixth term if the Yankees started the 1990 season poorly. Yogi Berra, Houk, Bob Lemon, Gene Michael, Lou Piniella and Dick Howser each served two terms as the Yankees' manager. Howser's first term lasted only a single game, as interim manager in 1978 between Martin's firing and Lemon's hiring. Howser also managed a full season in 1980, leading the team to the playoffs, but was fired after the Yankees failed to advance to the World Series. Howser has the highest career winning percentage among all Yankee managers at .632.

== Key ==
#	Number of managers^{[a]}
G	Regular season games managed; may not equal sum of wins and losses due to tie games
W	Regular season wins
L	Regular season losses
Win%	Winning percentage
PA	Playoff appearances: number of years this manager has led the franchise to the playoffs
PW	Playoff wins
PL	Playoff losses
Ref	Reference
LC	League Championships: number of League Championships, or pennants, achieved by the manager
WS	World Series Championships: number of World Series victories achieved by the manager
†	Inducted into the Baseball Hall of Fame primarily as a manager or executive
*	Inducted into the Baseball Hall of Fame primarily as a player

== Managers ==
Statistics current as of 2023

#^{[a]}	Image	Manager	Seasons	G	W	L	Win%	PA	PW	PL	LC	WS	Ref
1		John McGraw^{†}	1901–1902	193	94	96	.495	—	—	—	—	—	
2		Wilbert Robinson^{†}	1902	83	24	57	.296	—	—	—	—	—	
3		Clark Griffith^{†}	1903–1908	807	490	370	.558	—	—	—	—	—	
4		Kid Elberfeld	1908	98	27	71	.276	—	—	—	—	—	
5		George Stallings	1909–1910	295	152	136	.515	—	—	—	—	—	
6		Hal Chase	1910–1911	167	86	80	.515	—	—	—	—	—	
7		Harry Wolverton	1912	153	50	102	.327	—	—	—	—	—	
8		Frank Chance*	1913–1914	290	117	168	.403	—	—	—	—	—	
9		Roger Peckinpaugh	1914	20	10	10	.500	—	—	—	—	—	
10		Wild Bill Donovan	1915–1917	465	220	239	.473	—	—	—	—	—	
11		Miller Huggins^{†}	1918–1929	1,796	1,067	719	.594	6	18	15	6	3	
12		Art Fletcher	1929	11	6	5	.545	—	—	—	—	—	
13		Bob Shawkey	1930	154	86	68	.558	—	—	—	—	—	
14		Joe McCarthy^{†}	1931–1946	2,348	1,460	867	.627	8	29	9	8	7	
15		Bill Dickey*	1946	105	57	48	.543	—	—	—	—	—	
16		Johnny Neun	1946	14	8	6	.571	—	—	—	—	—	
17		Bucky Harris	1947–1948	309	191	117	.620	1	4	3	1	1	
18		Casey Stengel^{†}	1949–1960	1,851	1,149	696	.623	10	37	26	10	7	
19		Ralph Houk	1961–1963	486	309	176	.637	3	8	8	3	2	
20		Yogi Berra*	1964	162	99	63	.611	1	3	4	1	0	
21		Johnny Keane	1965–1966	182	81	101	.445	—	—	—	—	—	
–		Ralph Houk	1966–1973	1,271	635	630	.502	—	—	—	—	—	
22		Bill Virdon	1974–1975	266	142	124	.534	—	—	—	—	—	
23		Billy Martin^{[b]}	1975–1978	471	279	192	.592	2	10	10	2	1	
24		Dick Howser^{[b]}	1978	1	0	1	.000	—	—	—	—	—	
25		Bob Lemon*^{[b]}	1978–1979	133	82	51	.617	1	7	3	1	1	
–		Billy Martin	1979	95	55	40	.579	—	—	—	—	—	
–		Dick Howser	1980	162	103	59	.636	1	0	3	0	0	
26		Gene Michael^{[c]}	1981	82	48	34	.585	—	—	—	—	—	
–		Bob Lemon*^{[c]}	1981–1982	39	17	22	.436	1	8	6	1	0	
–		Gene Michael	1982	86	44	42	.512	—	—	—	—	—	
27		Clyde King	1982	62	29	33	.468	—	—	—	—	—	
–		Billy Martin	1983	162	91	71	.562	—	—	—	—	—	
–		Yogi Berra*	1984–1985	178	93	85	.522	—	—	—	—	—	
–		Billy Martin	1985	145	91	54	.628	—	—	—	—	—	
28		Lou Piniella	1986–1987	324	179	145	.552	—	—	—	—	—	
–		Billy Martin	1988	68	40	28	.588	—	—	—	—	—	
–		Lou Piniella	1988	93	45	48	.484	—	—	—	—	—	
29		Dallas Green	1989	121	56	65	.463	—	—	—	—	—	
30		Bucky Dent	1989–1990	89	36	53	.404	—	—	—	—	—	
31		Stump Merrill	1990–1991	275	120	155	.436	—	—	—	—	—	
32		Buck Showalter^{[d]}	1992–1995	582	313	268	.539	1	2	3	0	0	
33		Joe Torre^{[e]}^{†}	1996–2007	1,942	1,173	767	.605	12	76	47	6	4	
34		Joe Girardi	2008–2017	1,620	910	710	.562	6	28	24	1	1	
35		Aaron Boone	2018–present	1,355	790	563	.583	8	27	30	1	0	

== Managers with multiple tenures ==
#^{[a]}	Manager	Seasons	G	W	L	Win%	PA	PW	PL	LC	WS	Ref
19	Ralph Houk	1961–1963; 1966–1973	1,757	944	806	.539	3	8	8	3	2	
20	Yogi Berra*	1964, 1984–1985	342	192	148	.565	1	3	4	1	0	
23	Billy Martin^{[b]}	1975–1978, 1979, 1983, 1985, 1988	941	556	385	.591	2	10	10	2	1	
24	Dick Howser^{[b]}	1978, 1980	163	103	60	.632	1	0	3	0	0	
25	Bob Lemon*^{[b]}^{[c]}	1978–1979; 1981–1982	172	99	73	.576	2	15	9	2	1	
26	Gene Michael^{[c]}	1981, 1982	168	92	76	.548	—	—	—	—	—	
28	Lou Piniella	1986–1987, 1988	417	224	193	.537	—	—	—	—	—	

== Notes ==
- ^{a} A running total of the number of managers of the Yankees. Thus, any manager who has two or more separate terms as a manager is only counted once.
- ^{b} Three managers, Billy Martin, Dick Howser and Bob Lemon, managed the Yankees during their World Series championship season of 1978. Lemon managed the Yankees in the playoffs, and thus is credited with the playoff appearance, league championship and World Series championship for that season.
- ^{c} Two managers, Gene Michael and Bob Lemon, managed the Yankees during their league championship season of 1981. Lemon managed the Yankees in the playoffs, and thus is credited with the playoff appearance and league championship for that season.
- ^{d} Buck Showalter won the Manager of the Year Award in 1994.
- ^{e} Joe Torre won the Manager of the Year Award in 1996 and 1998.
