= Roger Peckinpaugh =

American baseball player and manager (1891–1977)

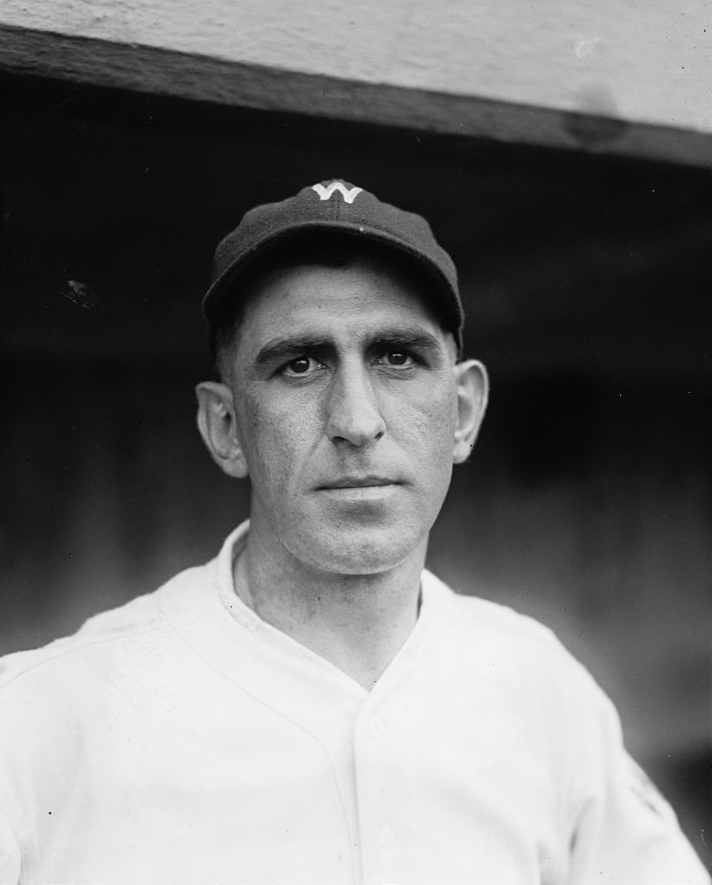
- Peckinpaugh with the Washington Senators in 1924
- Shortstop / Manager
- Born: February 5, 1891; Wooster, Ohio, U.S.
- Died: November 17, 1977 (aged 86); Cleveland, Ohio, U.S.
- Batted: Right Threw: Right

MLB debut
- September 15, 1910, for the Cleveland Naps

Last MLB appearance
- September 25, 1927, for the Chicago White Sox

MLB statistics
- Batting average: .259
- Home runs: 48
- Runs batted in: 740
- Managerial record: 500–491
- Winning %: .505
- Stats at Baseball Reference

Teams
- As player: Cleveland Naps (1910, 1912–1913); New York Yankees (1913–1921); Washington Senators (1922–1926); Chicago White Sox (1927); As manager: New York Yankees (1914); Cleveland Indians (1928–1933, 1941)

Career highlights and awards
- World Series champion (1924); AL MVP (1925)

Roger Thorpe Peckinpaugh (February 5, 1891 – November 17, 1977) was an American professional baseball player shortstop and manager. He played in Major League Baseball (MLB) from 1910 through 1927, during which he played for the Cleveland Naps, New York Yankees, Washington Senators and Chicago White Sox.

Nap Lajoie discovered Peckinpaugh as a high school student, and signed him to his first professional contract. Peckinpaugh debuted with the Naps, who traded him to the Yankees in 1913. He managed the Yankees for 20 games in 1914 and was the team captain for the remainder of his time with the club. The Senators acquired Peckinpaugh, where he continued to play until his final season, spent with the White Sox. After his playing career, Peckinpaugh managed the Indians from 1928 through 1933 and in 1941. He was also a minor league baseball manager, and served in the front office of the Indians and Buffalo Bisons from 1942 through 1947.

Peckinpaugh was considered an excellent defensive shortstop and strong leader. When he managed the Yankees, he became the youngest manager in MLB history. He was named American League Most Valuable Player in 1925. He played in the World Series three times: winning the 1924 World Series with the Senators, losing the 1921 World Series with the Yankees, and losing the 1925 World Series with the Senators.

== Early life and amateur career ==
Peckinpaugh was born in Wooster, Ohio, the third child of Frank and Cora Peckinpaugh. His father played semi-professional baseball.

At a young age, the Peckinpaughs moved from Wooster to Cleveland. He attended East High School, where he played American football, basketball, and baseball. There, Nap Lajoie of the Cleveland Naps, who lived in the same neighborhood, discovered Peckinpaugh. Lajoie signed Peckinpaugh to a contract with a salary of $125 per month ($4,218 in current dollar terms) when he graduated from high school in 1910.

== Playing career ==
=== Cleveland Naps and New York Yankees (1910–1921) ===
The Naps started Peckinpaugh's professional career by assigning him to the New Haven Prairie Hens of the Class-B Connecticut League. He was promoted to the Naps to make his Major League Baseball (MLB) debut in September 1910, playing in 15 games for the Naps at age 19. The Naps assigned Peckinpaugh to the Portland Beavers of the Class-A Pacific Coast League for the entire 1911 season. He appeared in 70 games for the Naps in 1912, batting only .212. On May 25, 1913, after giving the starting shortstop position to Ray Chapman, the Naps traded Peckinpaugh to the New York Yankees for Jack Lelivelt and Bill Stumpf.

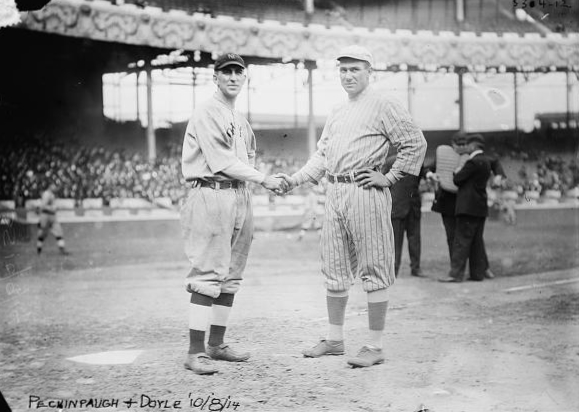
Peckinpaugh (left) with Larry Doyle (right) of the New York Giants

The Naps soon regretted the trade. With the Yankees, Peckinpaugh emerged as a team leader. He was named captain in 1914 by manager Frank Chance. Chance resigned with three weeks remaining in the season, and Peckinpaugh served as player–manager for the remainder of the season; at the age of 23, he became the youngest manager in MLB history. He finished the 1914 season fifth in the AL with 38 stolen bases.

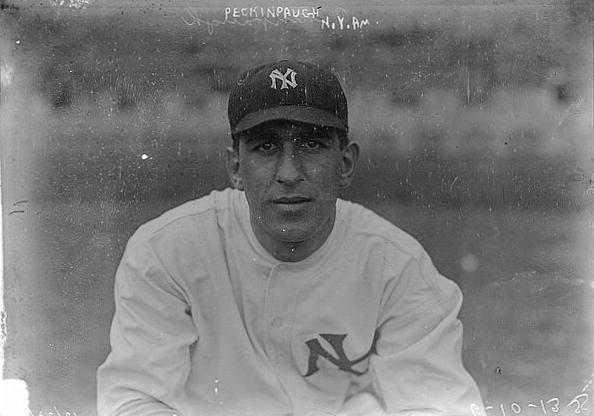
Peckinpaugh with the New York Yankees

Bill Donovan was hired as the Yankees manager in the offseason. In the 1914–15 offseason, Peckinpaugh considered leaving the Yankees to join the Federal League, as he received offers from the Chicago Federals, Buffalo Blues, and Indianapolis Hoosiers. After considering the offer from Chicago, he chose to stay with the Yankees, and received a three-year contract worth $6,000 ($186,493 in current dollar terms) per season from 1915 through 1917. He resigned with the Yankees in 1918. Peckinpaugh tied Buck Weaver for fourth in runs scored (89) and several players for eighth in home runs (7) in the 1919 season.

By the 1921 season, Peckinpaugh was one of three players, along with Wally Pipp and Bob Shawkey, remaining with the Yankees from the time Jacob Ruppert and Tillinghast L'Hommedieu Huston purchased the team in 1915. The Yankees reached the World Series in 1921, losing to the New York Giants. Peckinpaugh set an MLB record for most assists in one game by a shortstop with nine.

=== Washington Senators and Chicago White Sox (1922–1926) ===
Peckinpaugh was traded twice during the 1921–22 offseason. On December 20, 1921, the Yankees traded Peckinpaugh with Rip Collins, Bill Piercy, Jack Quinn and $100,000 ($1,762,873 in current dollar terms) to the Boston Red Sox for Bullet Joe Bush, Sad Sam Jones and Everett Scott. On January 10, 1922, Pecknipaugh was involved in a three-team trade involving the Red Sox, Washington Senators and Philadelphia Athletics, where Peckinpaugh joined the Senators, Joe Dugan and Frank O'Rourke went to the Red Sox, and the Athletics acquired Bing Miller, José Acosta, and $50,000 ($939,264 in current dollar terms). Though team owner Clark Griffith had indicated that Peckinpaugh would serve as his player-manager at the time of the trade, he named Clyde Milan player-manager for the 1922 season instead. This distracted Peckinpaugh, and along with injuries, limited his performance.

Chance, now managing the Boston Red Sox, attempted to acquire Peckinpaugh from the Senators before the 1923 season. Remaining in Washington, Peckinpaugh rebounded during the 1923 season with timely hitting and solid fielding.

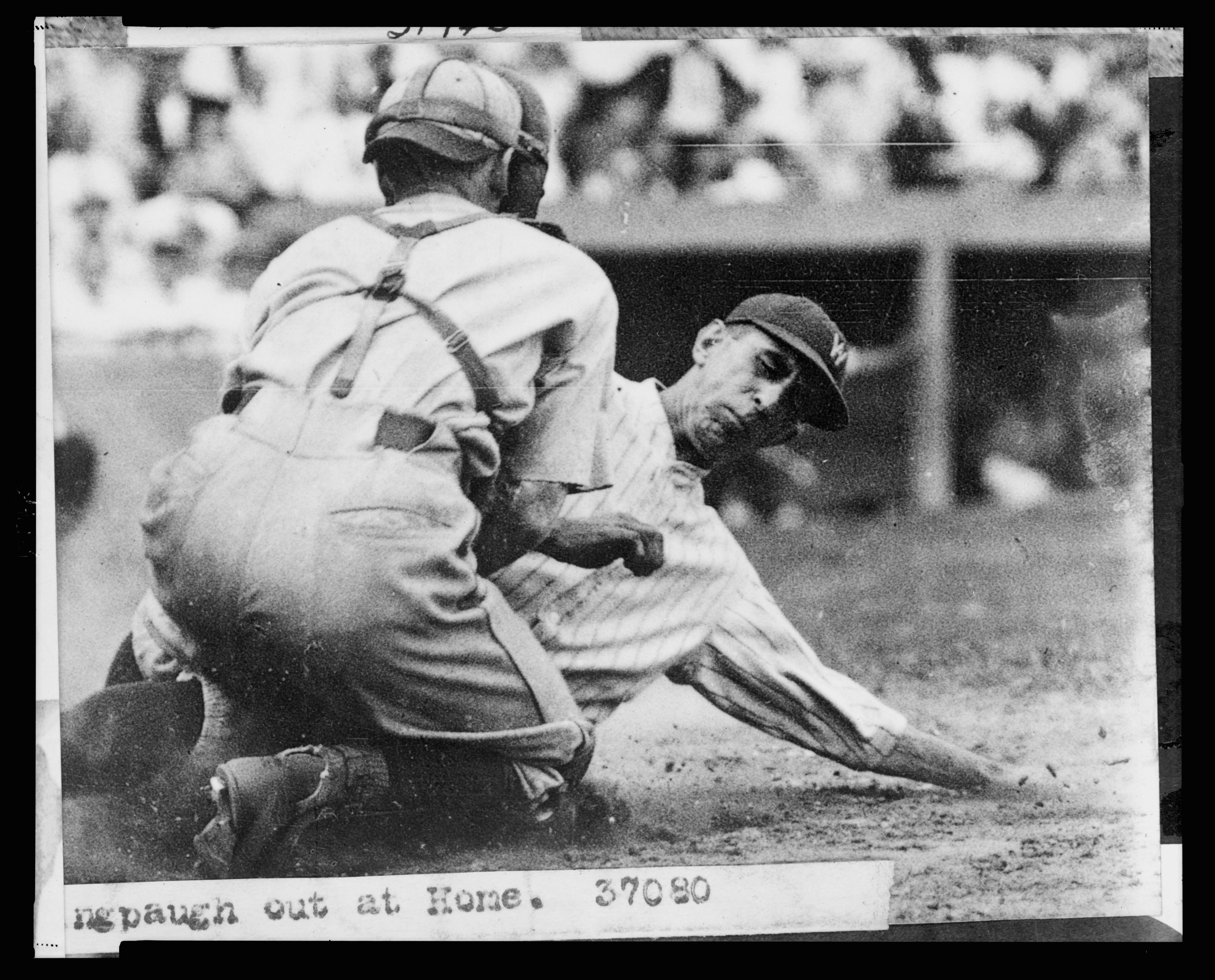
Peckinpaugh tagged out at home in the mid-1920s

Griffith appointed Bucky Harris as manager before the 1924 season. Harris considered Peckinpaugh his "assistant manager". Peckinpaugh was a key contributor in the 1924 World Series, in which the Senators defeated the Giants. He won the League Award as the AL's Most Valuable Player in 1925, edging Al Simmons by a small margin. In the 1925 World Series against the Pittsburgh Pirates, Peckinpaugh committed eight errors in the seven-game series, an MLB record.

On January 15, 1927, the Senators traded Peckinpaugh to the Chicago White Sox for Leo Mangum and Sloppy Thurston. However, his playing time with the White Sox was limited by a leg injury. He acted as an advisor to manager Ray Schalk. After one season with the White Sox, Peckinpaugh retired as a player.

== Managerial and executive career ==
Peckinpaugh was named manager of the Cleveland Indians after the 1927 season. After the Indians fell from first to fifth place during the 1933 season, the Indians fired Peckinpaugh, replacing him with Walter Johnson.

After being considered for the Detroit Tigers' managerial vacancy that offseason, Peckinpaugh took over as manager of the Kansas City Blues of the Class-AA American Association for the 1934 season. Out of professional baseball in 1935, Peckinpaugh joined Lew Fonseca on nationwide baseball tours, which involved the viewing of a movie and technical demonstrations. He applied to be manager of the Boston Bees for the 1938 season, but the job was given to Casey Stengel. Peckinpaugh returned to professional baseball as the manager of the New Orleans Pelicans of the Class-A1 Southern Association in 1939.

The Indians rehired Peckinpaugh as their manager in 1941, signing him to a two-year contract; team president Alva Bradley, who fired Peckinpaugh in 1933, promised Peckinpaugh full cooperation and minimal interference. After the 1941 season, he was promoted to vice president, later serving as Cleveland's general manager and president. When Bill Veeck bought the Indians in July 1946, he brought Harry Grabiner and Joseph C. Hostetler with him to serve in the front office. Peckinpaugh and Bradley resigned.

Peckinpaugh succeeded Harris as general manager for the Buffalo Bisons of the International League in the 1946–47 offseason. He was fired after the 1947 season, as the team's directors felt Peckinpaugh failed to sufficiently develop a farm system.

=== Managerial record ===
| Team | Year | Regular season | | | | | Postseason | | | |
| Team | Year | Games | Won | Lost | Win % | Finish | Won | Lost | Win % | Result |
|---|---|---|---|---|---|---|---|---|---|---|
| NYY | 1914 | 20 | 10 | 10 | .500 | 6th in AL | – | – | – | – |
| NYY total | | 20 | 10 | 10 | .500 | | 0 | 0 | – | |
| CLE | 1928 | 154 | 62 | 92 | .403 | 7th in AL | – | – | – | – |
| CLE | 1929 | 152 | 81 | 71 | .533 | 3rd in AL | – | – | – | – |
| CLE | 1930 | 154 | 81 | 73 | .526 | 4th in AL | – | – | – | – |
| CLE | 1931 | 154 | 78 | 76 | .506 | 4th in AL | – | – | – | – |
| CLE | 1932 | 152 | 87 | 65 | .572 | 4th in AL | – | – | – | – |
| CLE | 1933 | 51 | 26 | 25 | .510 | fired | – | – | – | – |
| CLE | 1941 | 154 | 75 | 79 | .487 | 5th in AL | – | – | – | – |
| CLE total | | 971 | 490 | 481 | .505 | | 0 | 0 | – | |
| Total | | 991 | 500 | 491 | .505 | | 0 | 0 | – | |

== Personal ==
Peckinpaugh was considered a calm baseball player and manager, who did not let his temper get the best of him.

After the end of his baseball career, Peckinpaugh worked as a manufacturer's representative for the Cleveland Oak Belting Company. He retired in 1976 at the age of 85. Suffering from cancer and heart disease, he was brought to a hospital for a respiratory condition, and died on November 17, 1977, in Cleveland. He was buried in Acacia Masonic Memorial Park in Mayfield Heights, Ohio. His wife, Mildred, died five years earlier. Together, they had four sons. Peckinpaugh was survived by two of his sons.

== See also ==
- List of Major League Baseball career runs scored leaders
- List of Major League Baseball career stolen bases leaders
- List of Major League Baseball player-managers
