= Howard Craghead =

American baseball player (1908–1962)

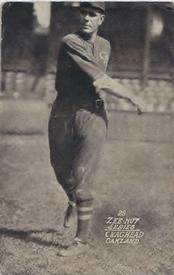
- Pitcher
- Born: May 25, 1908; Selma, California
- Died: July 14, 1962 (aged 54); San Diego, California
- Batted: Right Threw: Right

MLB debut
- April 30, 1931, for the Cleveland Indians

Last MLB appearance
- June 28, 1933, for the Cleveland Indians

MLB statistics
- Win–loss record: 0–0
- Earned run average: 6.26
- Innings pitched: 23
- Stats at Baseball Reference

Teams
- Cleveland Indians (1931, 1933)

Howard Craghead (May 25, 1908 – July 14, 1962), nicknamed "Judge", was a baseball player who played professional baseball in the 1930s. Craghead mainly played in the minor leagues, for the Toledo Mud Hens. Craghead did manage to pitch 23 innings during his career however for the Cleveland Indians, with no decisions and an earned run average of 6.26. He later became a Lieutenant Commander in the U.S. Navy during World War II. In 1974, Craghead was inducted into the Fresno County Athletic Hall of Fame.
