= Roxie Lawson =

American baseball player (1906–1977)

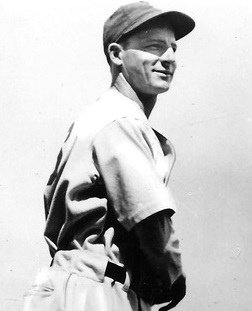
- Lawson, circa 1933–39
- Pitcher
- Born: April 13, 1906; Donnellson, Iowa, U.S.
- Died: April 9, 1977 (aged 70); Stockport, Iowa, U.S.
- Batted: Right Threw: Right

MLB debut
- August 3, 1930, for the Cleveland Indians

Last MLB appearance
- September 28, 1940, for the St. Louis Browns

MLB statistics
- Win–loss record: 47–39
- Earned run average: 5.37
- Strikeouts: 258
- Stats at Baseball Reference

Teams
- Cleveland Indians (1930–1931); Detroit Tigers (1933, 1935–1939); St. Louis Browns (1939–1940)

Alfred Voyle "Roxie" Lawson (April 13, 1906 – April 9, 1977) was an American baseball player and manager. He was a right-handed pitcher in professional baseball for 13 years from 1929 to 1941, including nine years in Major League Baseball with the Cleveland Indians (1930–1931), Detroit Tigers (1933, 1935–1939), and St. Louis Browns (1939–1940). During his major league career, he compiled a 47–39 win–loss record with a career earned run average (ERA) of 5.37. Lawson pitched with a right-handed side-arm delivery.

After his playing career was over, Lawson managed at the minor league level, with the Meridian Peps (Meridian, Mississippi) in the Southeastern League in 1947 and with the Green Bay Bluejays of the Wisconsin State League in 1948.

== Early years ==
Lawson was born in Donnellson, Iowa, in 1906. His father, William Lawson, was a blacksmith. The family moved to Stockport, Iowa, when Lawson was a child. He played baseball at Stockport High School and began pitching as a senior, but "he was so wild there was as much likelihood of his tosses hitting the third baseman as there was of them arriving somewhere in the vicinity of the batter."

After graduating from high school, he played semi-pro baseball and developed a reputation for his ability to strike out 10 to 15 batters per game.

Lawson attended Iowa Wesleyan College where he excelled as a college basketball player. After it was discovered that Lawson had played semi-pro baseball, he was declared ineligible to compete in intercollegiate athletics. Accordingly, and after his third semester at the school, Lawson quit college and told officials, "No play, no study, I quit."

== Professional baseball ==
=== 1929–1934 ===
After leaving Iowa Wesleyan, Lawson began playing professional baseball with the Keokuk Indians in Keokuk, Iowa. He did not make it in Keokuk and was demoted to a club in Decorah, Iowa. While playing for Decorah, he signed with a scout for the Cleveland Indians. The Indians assigned him the Terre Haute Tots in the Three-I League. In two seasons with Terre Haute, he compiled an 8–4 record in 1929 and a 14–7 record in 1930. Wildness continued to be a problem for Lawson while with Terre Haute.

In July 1930, the Cleveland Indians purchased Lawson from Terre Haute. He made his Major League Baseball debut on August 3, 1930, pitching 3-1/3 innings against the St. Louis Browns and allowing one earned run. On August 13, he started his first major league game, a 7–2 loss to the Philadelphia Athletics. Lawson appeared in seven games, four as a starter, for the 1930 Indians and compiled a 1–2 record with a 6.15 ERA. Lawson remained with the Indians during their 1931 season, appearing in 17 games (three as a starter) and compiling a 0–2 record and 7.60 ERA.

In March 1932, the Indians transferred Lawson to the Toledo Mud Hens. He appeared in 32 game for the Mud Hens in 1931, compiling a 12–11 record with a 5.56 ERA. In 1933, he appeared in a career high 43 games and 248 innings for Toledo. He compiled an 18–14 record with a 4.57 ERA.

On September 4, 1933, and after a strong season with Toledo, Lawson was sold to the Detroit Tigers for cash and players. He appeared in four games for the Tigers during their 1933 season, two as a starter, and compiled a 0–1 record with a 7.31 ERA in 16 innings pitched.

In January 1934, the Tigers returned Lawson to the Toledo Mud Hens. During the 1934 season, Lawson appeared in 42 games (202 innings) and compiled a 9–14 record with a 5.66 ERA.

=== 1935 ===
Lawson began the 1935 season with the Toledo Mud Hens and posted one of the best seasons of his career. He appeared in 25 games (211 innings) with the Mud Hens and compiled a 14–8 record and a 3.92 ERA.

On August 21, 1935, the Detroit Tigers again purchased Lawson from Toledo, with the intention of using him as a relief pitcher during the final weeks of a season that was heavy with doubleheaders. On August 24, manager Mickey Cochrane tabbed Lawson to start for the Tigers against Lefty Grove and the Boston Red Sox. Lawson was at the time the best pitcher in the American League (his 2.70 ERA led the American League in 1935), and an account in the Detroit Free Press analogized Cochrane's decision to start Lawson against Grove and Boston to throwing a sacrificial lamb to the lions. The newspaper's game summary opened: "They tossed the lamb in to the Lions at Navin Field Saturday afternoon, and while 22,000 wide-eyed fans stared in disbelief, the lamb up and ran the lions right out of the ballpark." Lawson held Boston to five hits in nine innings and won a 2–0 shutout victory. Four days later, on August 28, he pitched a four-hit shutout and prevented a batter from advancing beyond second base against the Philadelphia Athletics. Lawson also hit a single and a double against Philadelphia, and the shutout gave him an 18-inning scoreless streak in the week since joining the Tigers. In all, Lawson appeared in seven games, four as a starter, for the 1935 Tigers compiled a 3-1 record with a 1.58 ERA.

The 1935 Tigers went on to defeat the Chicago Cubs in the 1935 World Series. However, Lawson did not pitch in the World Series, as the Tigers starters threw five complete games. After the 1935 season, Lawson returned to his home in Stockport, Iowa, where a banquet was held in his honor.

=== 1936–1941 ===
Lawson remained with the Tigers in 1936. He appeared in 41 games, only eight as a starter, and compiled an 8–6 record and 5.48 ERA. Used principally in relief, Lawson ranked sixth in the American League in saves in 1936.

Lawson's best season was 1937, when he compiled an 18–7 record for the Tigers. He had career highs that year with 18 wins, 217 1/3 innings pitched, and 29 games started. He ranked among the American League leaders in 1937 with 18 wins (third), a .720 winning percentage (sixth), and 15 complete games (tenth). In 1937, he also had a .259 batting average with five RBIs. He ranked 19th in the voting for the 1937 American League Most Valuable Player award. Sportswriter Clifford Bloodgood in Baseball Magazine described Lawson in 1937 as "a pitcher who has a variety of stuff, the most baffling of which perhaps is an excellent change of pace" and noted that Lawson's delivery of his change of pace pitch "masks his intentions completely."

In 1938, Lawson appeared in 27 games, 16 as a starter, and compiled an 8–9 record and 5.46 ERA. The following year, he appeared in two games for the Tigers early in the year, winning one and losing the other.

On May 13, 1939, Lawson was sent to the St. Louis Browns as part of a 10-player trade that sent Bobo Newsom to the Tigers. After the trade, Lawson appeared in 36 games, 14 as a starter, for the 1939 Browns, compiling a 3–7 record with a 5.32 ERA. In 1940, Lawson's second season with the Browns, Lawson appeared in 30 games, two as a starter, and compiled a 5–3 record with a 5.13 ERA. He also ranked eighth in the American League with four saves.

During the 1941 season, Lawson was affiliated with five different team. He began the season with the Browns, but was traded to the Montreal Royals of the international League in April. After compiling a 0–3 record at Montreal, he was traded in June to the Atlanta Crackers. However, he refused to report to the Crackers. Upon being returned to Montreal, he was next traded to the Milwaukee Brewers of the American Association in July. He compiled a 1–2 record in five games for Milwaukee, and he then finished the 1941 season with the Nashville Vols with whom he compiled a 5–3 record and a 4.11 ERA. Lawson concluded his playing career in 1942 with the Milwaukee Brewers, compiling a 6–6 record and a 5.54 ERA.

=== Military service and managerial career ===
In November 1942, Lawson enlisted in the United States Navy. After his wartime service was concluded, Lawson was hired in January 1947 as the manager of the Meridian Peps, a Southeastern League team in Meridian, Mississippi. He spent only one season with Meridian and was hired in January 1948 as the manager of the Green Bay Bluejays. The Bluejays compiled a 37–35 record under Lawson before he resigned on July 16, 1948.

After his managerial career ended, Lawson worked as an umpire in the Three-Eye League.

== Family and later years ==
Lawson was married to Blanche Klise, and they had a son, Roxie Lee. During Lawson's playing career, he and his wife lived on a farm in Iowa during the off-season. Lawson's wife died in an automobile accident near Marquette, Michigan, in 1957. Lawson died in 1977 at his home in Stockport, Iowa, at age 70.
