= Wagram, Ohio =

Unincorporated community in Ohio, U.S.

Coordinates: 39°57′24″N 82°43′50″W

Wagram is an unincorporated community in Licking County, in the U.S. state of Ohio.

== History ==
Wagram was originally called Cumberland, and under the latter name was laid out in 1831. A post office called Wagram was established in 1862, and remained in operation until 1907.

== Notable people ==
Jake Miller, a pitcher for the Cleveland Indians and Chicago White Sox, was born in Wagram in 1898.
