= Odell Hale =

American baseball player (1908–1980)

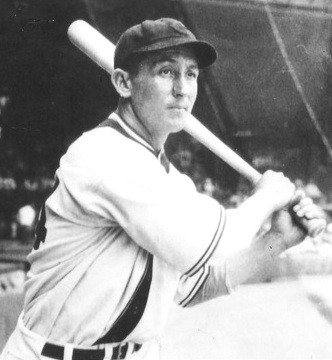
- Hale, circa 1936
- Second baseman / Third baseman
- Born: August 10, 1908; Hosston, Louisiana, U.S.
- Died: June 9, 1980 (aged 71); El Dorado, Arkansas, U.S.
- Batted: Right Threw: Right

MLB debut
- August 1, 1931, for the Cleveland Indians

Last MLB appearance
- September 7, 1941, for the New York Giants

MLB statistics
- Batting average: .289
- Home runs: 73
- Runs batted in: 573
- Stats at Baseball Reference

Teams
- Cleveland Indians (1931, 1933–1940); Boston Red Sox (1941); New York Giants (1941)

Arvel Odell Hale (August 10, 1908 – June 9, 1980) was a Major League Baseball infielder in the 1930s and early 1940s, primarily for the Cleveland Indians. Though he was born Arvel Odell Hale, baseball encyclopedias listed him simply as Odell Hale, which stuck with him as well as the nickname "Bad News". Hale had a 10-year career, including four seasons with a batting average over .300. He finished his career with a .289 batting average with 73 home runs and 573 RBI.

Hale was born in Hosston, Louisiana, and his parents were farmers. Hale attended 11 years of elementary and high school, and took a job working at an oil refinery in El Dorado at the age of 17. By 1930, he was working as a tank car loader for Lion Oil, and had also been playing semipro baseball. Also in 1930, Hale married Mabel Jane Rainwater, a Native American from Oklahoma.

Hale first played professional baseball for the 1929 Alexandria Reds. After batting .324 with 23 home runs, Hale's contract was purchased by the Chicago Cubs, and Hale played the 1931 season for the minor league Decatur Commodores. Hale made his debut with the Cleveland Indians later that year.

Hale played in the major leagues until 1941, and the minor leagues until 1942, before retiring after the 1942 season. After retiring, Hale took a job with a defense plant in El Dorado, Arkansas, a firm that was later bought up by Monsanto Chemical Company. Hale worked as a senior operator there until his retirement. He suffered a stroke at age 71 and was admitted to a nursing home, where he died two weeks later.

== See also ==
- List of Major League Baseball players to hit for the cycle

Achievements
Preceded by Lou Gehrig	Hitting for the cycle July 12, 1938	Succeeded by Sam Chapman
