= Les Barnhart =

American baseball player (1905–1971)

- Pitcher
- Born: February 23, 1905; Hoxie, Kansas
- Died: October 7, 1971 (aged 66); Scottsdale, Arizona
- Batted: Right Threw: Right

MLB debut
- September 22, 1928, for the Cleveland Indians

Last MLB appearance
- September 27, 1930, for the Cleveland Indians
- Stats at Baseball Reference

Teams
- Cleveland Indians (1928, 1930)

Leslie Earl Barnhart (February 23, 1905 – October 7, 1971) was an American Major League Baseball pitcher who played for two seasons. He played for the Cleveland Indians in 1928 and 1930.

In three appearances which included two starts, Barnhart posted a 1–1 record with a 6.75 earned run average in 17.1 innings pitched with only two strikeouts.
