= George Detore =

American baseball player (1906–1991)

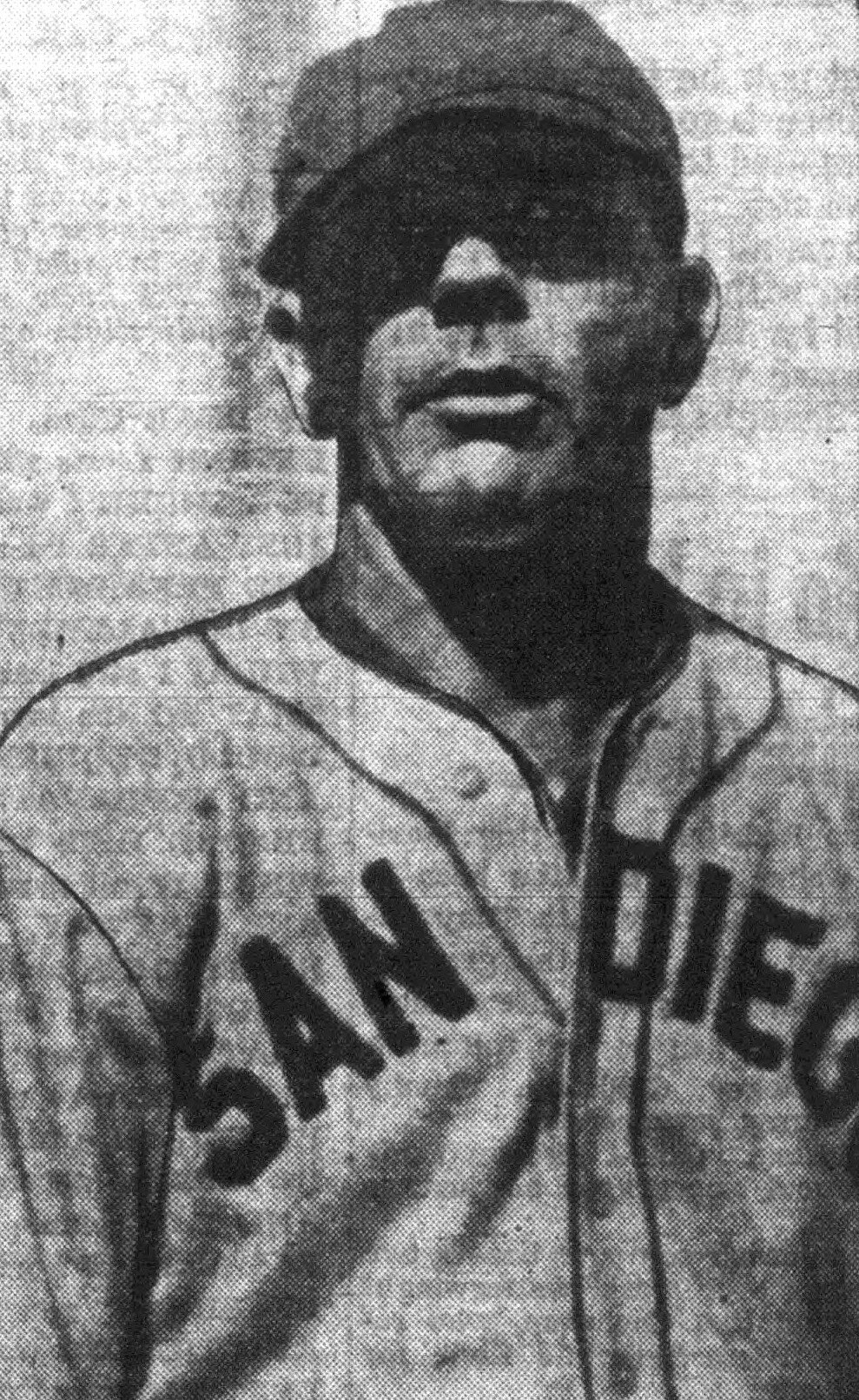
- Detroe, circa 1941
- Infielder
- Born: November 11, 1906; Utica, New York, U.S.
- Died: February 7, 1991 (aged 84); Utica, New York, U.S.
- Batted: Right Threw: Right

MLB debut
- September 14, 1930, for the Cleveland Indians

Last MLB appearance
- July 27, 1931, for the Cleveland Indians

MLB statistics
- Batting average: .250
- Home runs: 0
- Runs batted in: 9
- Stats at Baseball Reference

Teams
- Cleveland Indians (1930–1931)

George Francis Detore (November 11, 1906 – February 7, 1991) was an American professional baseball player, manager, scout and coach. He appeared in 33 games in Major League Baseball as an infielder for the Cleveland Indians from 1930 to 1931 and played in the minor leagues for 17 years. After his on-field career ended, he was a longtime member of the Pittsburgh Pirates organization.

A native of Utica, New York, Detore threw and batted right-handed and was listed at 5 feet 8 inches (1.73 m) tall and 170 pounds (77 kg). He attended Utica Free Academy and Colgate University, playing for the schools' baseball teams. He began his professional career in 1929 with the Decatur Commodores of the Three-I League. In 135 games primarily as a third baseman, Detore had a.342 batting average, 18 triples, and 10 home runs. His batting average was second-best in the Three-I League behind teammate Floyd "Pat" Patterson's.348 average. After the season ended, Cleveland Indians scout Bill Bradley, who had been watching his progress since his time at Colgate, recommended that the Indians purchase his contract; they did so and gave him an invitation to spring training.

He had two trials with Cleveland: three games played at the end of the 1930 season and 30 games during the first three months of 1931. His 17 total hits included seven doubles. He drove in nine runs. Defensively, he started 14 games, even split between shortstop and third base. His last three starts as a big leaguer came in a two-day span in 1931, and he doubled in each game. He was a clutch hitter who did his best work with men on base, hitting a phenomenal.393 with a.455 OBP in 33 such plate appearances. He also hit.429 (6-for-14) against future Hall of Famers.

He was a fixture in the top-level Pacific Coast League as an infielder and catcher. He was a manager in the minors for many years, beginning during World War II as the playing skipper of the PCL San Diego Padres, and then eventually joining the Pirates' organization in 1950. Detore served as an area scout based in New York or scouting supervisor for the Bucs from 1955 to 1963 and 1969 to 1986. He served on Danny Murtaugh's MLB coaching staff from May 6, 1959, through the end of the 1959 season, replacing Jimmy Dykes when Dykes left to become manager of the Detroit Tigers.

He had multiple family including his brother Nicholas Detore and his nephew Richard Detore who appeared in the Utica newspaper often and continued the baseball legacy.
