= Joe Sprinz =

American baseball player (1902–1994)

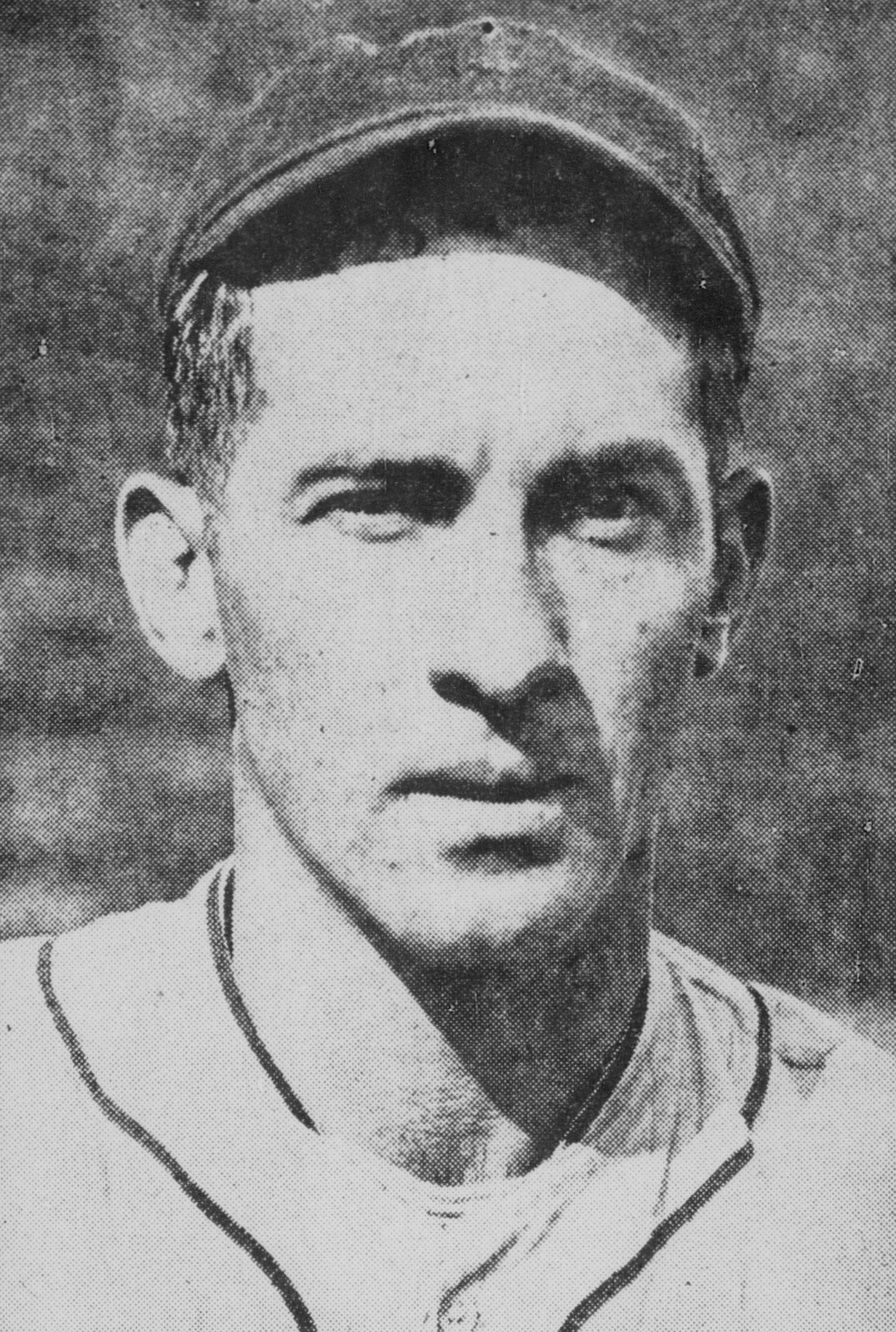
- Catcher
- Born: August 3, 1902; St. Louis, Missouri, U.S.
- Died: January 11, 1994 (aged 91); Fremont, California, U.S.
- Batted: Right Threw: Right

MLB debut
- July 16, 1930, for the Cleveland Indians

Last MLB appearance
- May 18, 1933, for the St. Louis Cardinals

MLB statistics
- Batting average: .170
- Home runs: 0
- Runs batted in: 2
- Stats at Baseball Reference

Teams
- Cleveland Indians (1930–1931); St. Louis Cardinals (1933)

Joseph Conrad "Mule" Sprinz (August 3, 1902 – January 11, 1994) was an American professional baseball player who attempted to beat the world record for catching a baseball dropped from a great height.

Sprinz died on January 11, 1994 at the age of 91. He was interred at Holy Cross Cemetery in Colma, California.

== Baseball career ==
Sprinz was a catcher who played in Major League Baseball for the Cleveland Indians from 1930 to 1931 and the St. Louis Cardinals in 1933. He played in 21 games in the majors, batting 6-for-53 with one double.

Sprinz spent 23 seasons in minor league baseball from 1924–1946, playing in 2,223 games for 13 different teams, batting .270 and hitting 26 home runs. He spent his final nine seasons with the San Francisco Seals of the Pacific Coast League.

== World record attempt ==
While playing for the San Francisco Seals, Sprinz attempted to beat the world record for catching a baseball dropped from a great height. On May 10, 1939, Sprinz was one of three players who caught balls dropped 437 feet (133 m) by Seals manager Lefty O'Doul from a tower at the Golden Gate International Exposition. O'Doul forbade the practice after the initial stunt but, that summer, Sprinz returned to the Exposition to make another attempt.

For a public stunt on his 37th birthday, August 3, 1939, Sprinz attempted to catch balls dropped from a blimp hovering approximately 800 feet (240 m) overhead. On his fifth attempt, a baseball entered his glove, slamming his glove hand into his face with such force that he broke his upper jaw in twelve places, fractured several of his teeth, and rendered him briefly unconscious. He was hospitalized and suffered from headaches for five years.

Sprinz has rejected deserving the Guinness World Record for the feat, recalling in 1975 "Naw, I never caught that thing... I saw that item in the Guinness book, but they got it all wrong."

Baseball writer Lee Warren speculated that, given the ubiquity of publicity stunts in Minor League Baseball, the Seals were likely involved in arranging for Sprinz to make an attempt at the world record despite the known danger. However, no firm evidence exists for this.
