= Ed Morgan (baseball) =

American baseball player (1904–1980)

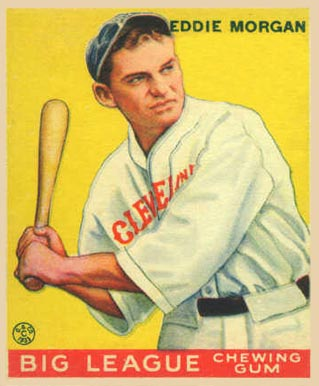
- Infielder
- Born: May 22, 1904; Cairo, Illinois
- Died: April 9, 1980 (aged 75); New Orleans, Louisiana
- Batted: Right Threw: Right

MLB debut
- April 11, 1928, for the Cleveland Indians

Last MLB appearance
- September 30, 1934, for the Boston Red Sox

MLB statistics
- Batting average: .313
- Home runs: 52
- Runs batted in: 473
- Stats at Baseball Reference

Teams
- Cleveland Indians (1928–1933); Boston Red Sox (1934)

Edward Carre Morgan (May 22, 1904 – April 9, 1980) was a baseball player for the Cleveland Indians and Boston Red Sox.

== Biography ==
Morgan was born May 22, 1904, in Cairo, Illinois.

Morgan entered the Major Leagues in 1928 with the Cleveland Indians. He played about half the season with them; over the next three years he became an everyday starter.

In 1930, his first full season, Morgan batted .349 with 47 doubles, 26 home runs, and 136 runs batted in. After the Indians refused him a raise for the following season, he reportedly threatened to quit baseball to go work for his wealthy father. In 1931, he batted a career-high .351. After being sent down to New Orleans by the Indians in 1933, Morgan was selected by the Boston Red Sox in the Rule 5 draft on October 3. He made his final major league appearance with Boston in 1934, and eventually went on to work for his father.

Morgan died April 9, 1980, in New Orleans, Louisiana.

== Career statistics ==
In 771 games played over seven major league seasons, Morgan hit .313 (879-for-2810) with 512 runs scored, 186 doubles, 45 triples, 52 home runs, 473 RBI, 385 walks, a .398 on-base percentage and .467 slugging percentage. He compiled a career .983 fielding percentage.

== See also ==
- List of Major League Baseball annual putouts leaders
- List of Major League Baseball career batting average leaders
- List of Major League Baseball career on-base percentage leaders
