= Johnny Hodapp =

American baseball player (1905–1980)

- Second baseman / Third baseman
- Born: September 26, 1905; Cincinnati, Ohio, U.S.
- Died: June 14, 1980 (aged 74); Cincinnati, Ohio, U.S.
- Batted: Right Threw: Right

MLB debut
- August 19, 1925, for the Cleveland Indians

Last MLB appearance
- September 23, 1933, for the Boston Red Sox

MLB statistics
- Batting average: .311
- Home runs: 28
- Runs batted in: 429
- Stats at Baseball Reference

Teams
- Cleveland Indians (1925–1932); Chicago White Sox (1932); Boston Red Sox (1933)

Urban John Hodapp (September 26, 1905 – June 14, 1980) was an American professional baseball player in the 1920s and 1930s, mostly for the Cleveland Indians of Major League Baseball (MLB). He primarily played second base, and was a solid contact hitter, with a .311 batting average over nine major league seasons.

== Career ==
Hodapp was first signed to the Indianapolis Indians in 1924, and he made his major league debut with the Cleveland Indians in 1925. He was traded along with Bob Seeds to the Chicago White Sox in exchange for Bill Cissell and Jim Moore in 1932. A year later, he was traded with Seeds to the Boston Red Sox. In 1933, he was traded to the Rochester Red Wings, who sold him to the Columbus Red Birds before he played a game. He finished the season with the Single-A Knoxville Smokies.

Hodapp's best year was in 1930, when he batted .354 with 121 runs batted in, leading the American League in hits (225) and doubles (51). Hodapp struck out only 136 times in 2,826 at-bats in his career, or once every 20.8 at-bats.

During his nine-year career, Hodapp appeared in 791 games and had a .311 batting average (880-2826) with 28 home runs and 429 RBI. His career numbers include 378 runs, 169 doubles, 34 triples, 18 stolen bases and 163 walks for a .350 on-base percentage and .425 slugging percentage. He recorded a .964 fielding percentage.

== Personal life ==
Hodapp was born on September 26, 1905, in Cincinnati. His father was John Hodapp, an undertaker born in Cincinnati of immigrant parents from Stadelhofen Baden, Germany, and his mother was Lena (Helena) Kneuven, born in Carthage (Cincinnati) Ohio, of Lower Saxon and Dutch immigrant parents. He had two younger brothers, Clifford B. and John W. ("Bill"). His brother Cliff played for the 1928 Quincy Indians. Hodapp was raised in the Carthage neighborhood of Cincinnati and attended St. Xavier High School.

Hodapp married Martha Garaghan of Indianapolis on November 3, 1931, and together they had five children. He worked as a funeral director at the family funeral home after retiring from baseball. He died on June 14, 1980.

== See also ==
- List of Major League Baseball annual doubles leaders
- List of Major League Baseball career batting average leaders

== Sources ==
- Biography at the Society for American Baseball Research
- Lee, Bill (April 16, 2009). The Baseball Necrology: The Post-Baseball Lives and Deaths of More Than 7,600 Major League Players and Others. McFarland & Company, Inc. p. 184. ISBN 978-1476609300.
