= Ed Montague (shortstop) =

American baseball player (1905–1988)

- Shortstop
- Born: July 24, 1905; San Francisco, California, U.S.
- Died: June 17, 1988 (aged 82); Daly City, California, U.S.
- Batted: Right Threw: Right

MLB debut
- May 14, 1928, for the Cleveland Indians

Last MLB appearance
- September 25, 1932, for the Cleveland Indians

MLB statistics
- Batting average: .262
- Home runs: 2
- Runs batted in: 69

Teams
- Cleveland Indians (1928, 1930–32)

Edward Francis Montague (July 24, 1905 – June 17, 1988) was an American infielder in Major League Baseball with the Cleveland Indians (1928, 1930–1932), primarily as a shortstop. He later became a scout, most notable for signing Willie Mays. He was born in San Francisco, and died at age 82 in Daly City, California. His son Ed was a major league umpire from 1974 until 2009.
