= Clint Brown (baseball) =

American baseball player (1903–1955)

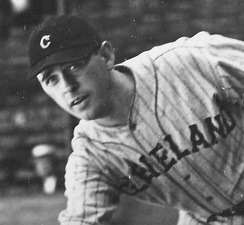
- Brown, circa 1928–35
- Pitcher
- Born: July 8, 1903; Blackash, Pennsylvania, U.S.
- Died: December 30, 1955 (aged 52); Rocky River, Ohio, U.S.
- Batted: Left Threw: Right

MLB debut
- September 27, 1928, for the Cleveland Indians

Last MLB appearance
- June 7, 1942, for the Cleveland Indians

MLB statistics
- Win–loss record: 89–93
- Earned run average: 4.26
- Strikeouts: 410
- Saves: 64
- Stats at Baseball Reference

Teams
- Cleveland Indians (1928–1935); Chicago White Sox (1936–1940); Cleveland Indians (1941–1942)

Clinton Harold Brown (July 8, 1903 – December 30, 1955) was an American professional baseball player.

== Biography ==
Born on July 8, 1903, in Blackash, Pennsylvania, Brown was a right-handed pitcher over parts of fifteen seasons (1928–1942) with the Cleveland Indians and Chicago White Sox. For his career, he compiled an 89–93 record in 434 appearances, mostly as a relief pitcher, with a 4.26 earned run average and 410 strikeouts.

As a hitter, Brown was better than average, posting a .199 batting average (91-for-457) with 42 runs, 2 home runs, 46 RBI and 45 bases on balls. Defensively, he was better than average, recording a .975 fielding percentage which was 20 points higher than the league average at his position.

In 1939, Brown finished 11th in the voting for American League Most Valuable Player.

== Death ==
After retiring from baseball following the 1942 season, Brown became a manufacturer's agent for Aluminum Smelting Corporation. Brown died at his home in Rocky River, Ohio on December 30, 1955 due to a heart attack. His burial was held at the Lakewood Park Cemetery in Rocky River.

== See also ==
- List of Major League Baseball annual saves leaders
