= Glenn Myatt =

American baseball player (1897–1969)

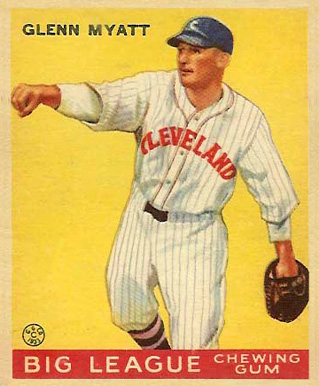
- Glenn Myatt 1933 Goudey baseball card
- Catcher
- Born: July 9, 1897; Argenta, Arkansas
- Died: August 9, 1969 (aged 72); Houston, Texas
- Batted: Left Threw: Right

MLB debut
- April 15, 1920, for the Philadelphia Athletics

Last MLB appearance
- September 9, 1936, for the Detroit Tigers

MLB statistics
- Batting average: .270
- Home runs: 38
- Runs batted in: 387
- Stats at Baseball Reference

Teams
- Philadelphia Athletics (1920–1921); Cleveland Indians (1923–1935); New York Giants (1935); Detroit Tigers (1936)

Glenn Calvin Myatt (July 9, 1897 – August 9, 1969) was an American professional baseball catcher. He played in Major League Baseball (MLB) from 1920 to 1935 for the Philadelphia Athletics (1920–1921), Cleveland Indians (1922–1935), New York Giants (1935–1936), and Detroit Tigers (1936).

In 1004 games over 16 seasons, Myatt posted a .270 batting average (722-for-2678) scoring 346 runs, 38 home runs and 387 runs batted in (RBIs). He finished his career with a .972 fielding percentage, playing at catcher and all three outfield positions.
