= Mel Harder =

American baseball player and manager (1909–2002)

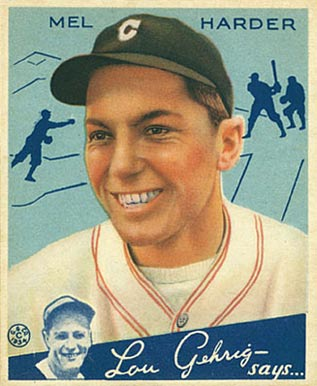
- Pitcher / Manager
- Born: October 15, 1909; Beemer, Nebraska, U.S.
- Died: October 20, 2002 (aged 93); Chardon, Ohio, U.S.
- Batted: Right Threw: Right

MLB debut
- April 24, 1928, for the Cleveland Indians

Last MLB appearance
- September 7, 1947, for the Cleveland Indians

MLB statistics
- Win–loss record: 223–186
- Earned run average: 3.80
- Strikeouts: 1,160
- Stats at Baseball Reference
- Managerial record at Baseball Reference

Teams
- As player: Cleveland Indians (1928–1947); As manager: Cleveland Indians (1961, 1962)

Career highlights and awards
- 4× All-Star (1934–1937); World Series champion (1948); AL ERA leader (1933); Cleveland Guardians No. 18 retired; Cleveland Guardians Hall of Fame

Melvin Leroy Harder (October 15, 1909 – October 20, 2002), nicknamed "Chief", was an American right-handed starting pitcher, coach and manager in Major League Baseball, who played his entire career with the Cleveland Indians. He spent 42 seasons in baseball, the first 36 with the Indians as a pitcher from 1928 to 1947 and as one of the game's most highly regarded pitching coaches from 1948 to 1963. He set franchise records for wins (223), games started (433) and innings pitched (3426 1/3) which were later broken by Bob Feller, and he still holds the club record of 582 career games pitched. He was among the American League's career leaders in wins (9th), games (8th) and starts (10th) when he retired. He was also an excellent fielder, leading AL pitchers in putouts four times, then a record.

== Career ==
1948 picture pack card of Harder as a coach for the Cleveland Indians

Harder was born in Beemer, Nebraska, and graduated from Tech High School in North Omaha, Nebraska. He broke in with the Indians as a relief pitcher in 1928. His pitching style revolved around his fine curveball, a hard fastball and excellent control. He joined the starting rotation in 1930, and posted a record of 39–37 from 1930 to 1932; on July 31, 1932, he pitched the first game ever at Cleveland Municipal Stadium. In 1933 he finished second in the AL with an earned run average of 2.95, trailing teammate Monte Pearson (2.33); under current rules (one inning pitched per games played by team), enacted in 1951, Harder would have been credited with the league lead, as Pearson only pitched 135 innings of a 154 game season. In 1934 he finished with 20 wins, led the league with six shutouts, and was again second in ERA (2.61) to Lefty Gómez. In 1935 he was second to Wes Ferrell in wins (22) and innings (287 1/3), and was fifth in the AL with a 3.29 ERA. After developing a sore elbow and bursitis in his shoulder, he won at least 15 games each season from 1936 to 1939; he led AL pitchers in putouts in 1932, 1933, 1935 and 1938.

Harder was one of the most successful All-Stars of the 1930s, appearing in all four games from 1934 to 1937, and setting a record with 13 consecutive innings without an earned run. He won the 1934 All-Star game after relieving Red Ruffing with none out and two men on in the fifth inning, with an 8–6 lead; one run scored on a double steal, but Harder allowed only one hit in his five innings as the AL won 9–7. He earned a save in the 1935 game, pitching three scoreless innings to finish a 4–1 victory, and another in 1937 with three shutout innings in the 8–3 win; he also finished the 4–3 loss played at Cleveland in 1936 with two innings.

In 1940, he posted a 12–11 record, as the Indians finished one game behind the pennant-winning Detroit Tigers, wasting an early September lead amid clubhouse rancor; it would be the only season in his career in which the Indians came within ten games of the AL flag. After several more years in which his record hovered near .500, earning his 200th victory in 1944, Harder ended his career in 1947 with 1160 strikeouts and a 3.80 ERA. In addition to his 223 victories, his 186 losses remain a club record. Ironically, the Indians won the World Series the year after he retired.

From 1948 into the 1950s, he guided what became known as the Indians' "Big Four" pitching rotation, featuring Feller, Bob Lemon, Early Wynn and Mike Garcia; Harder had successfully transformed Lemon from an infielder into a top pitcher while working with him in the mid-1940s, and he taught future 300 game-winner Wynn the breaking ball and changeup. Wynn had had a losing record (72-87) before being traded to the Indians by the Washington Senators. In 1953, Lemon tied Harder's record by leading AL pitchers in putouts for the fourth time, and he broke the record the following year as the Indians won another pennant, but lost to the underdog New York Giants in the World Series. Herb Score was named the AL's Rookie of the Year in 1955 after Harder helped to develop his curveball. When Sal Maglie was struggling with the Indians, Harder watched some films of Maglie pitching with the Giants and figured out that he wasn't swivelling his foot like he normally did, which kept him from following through with his delivery. "As soon as I went back to the old way, everything was all right," Maglie said. During his coaching career, Harder served as interim manager of the Indians for the last game of the 1961 season and the last two games of 1962, winning all three contests. Late in his tenure, prominent young pitchers as Sam McDowell, Tommy John and Luis Tiant would come under his guidance. He was fired after the 1963 season, having spent the first 36 years of his adult life in Cleveland.

He later coached with the New York Mets (1964), Chicago Cubs (1965), Cincinnati Reds (1966–68) and Kansas City Royals (1969).

Cleveland retired his number 18 on July 28, 1990 (he wore 43 and 2 as a coach), and he was named one of the Indians' top 100 players in 2001.

In 2002, Harder died in Chardon, Ohio at age 93; at the time of his death, he had been one of only five living players who had played in the 1920s.

== Legacy ==
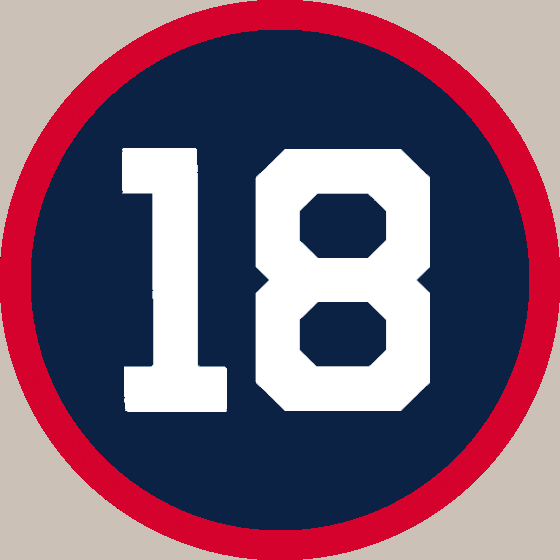
Mel Harder's number 18 was retired by the Cleveland Indians in 1990.

Harder is one of only four pitchers to pitch at least twenty seasons with one team (the others are Red Faber, Walter Johnson and Ted Lyons). He threw the first pitch ever thrown at Cleveland Municipal Stadium in a 1932 game and six decades later threw the first pitch in the construction site of its successor in Jacobs Field (now known as Progressive Field) in 1992.

Joe DiMaggio recalled that he had more difficulty batting against Harder than against just about any other pitcher. Hank Greenberg also named him one of the five toughest pitchers he faced in his career.

== Managerial Record ==
Team	Year	Regular season					Postseason			
Team	Year	Games	Won	Lost	Win %	Finish	Won	Lost	Win %	Result
CLE	1961	1	1	0	1.000	(interim)	–	–	–	
CLE	1962	2	2	0	1.000	(interim)	–	–	–	
Total		3	3	0	1.000		0	0	–	

== See also ==
- List of Major League Baseball retired numbers
- List of Major League Baseball career wins leaders
- List of Major League Baseball annual ERA leaders
- List of Major League Baseball players who spent their entire career with one franchise

Sporting positions
Preceded by n/a	Cleveland Indians pitching coach 1949–1963	Succeeded by Early Wynn
Preceded by Ernie White	New York Mets pitching coach 1964	Succeeded by Warren Spahn
Preceded by College of Coaches	Chicago Cubs pitching coach 1965	Succeeded by Freddie Fitzsimmons
Preceded by Jim Turner	Cincinnati Reds pitching coach 1966–1968	Succeeded by Harvey Haddix
Preceded by Franchise established	Kansas City Royals pitching coach 1969	Succeeded by Bob Lemon
