= Jake Miller (pitcher) =

American baseball player (1898–1975)

- Pitcher
- Born: February 28, 1898; Wagram, Ohio, U.S.
- Died: August 20, 1975 (aged 77); Venice, Florida, U.S.
- Batted: Left Threw: Left

MLB debut
- September 11, 1924, for the Cleveland Indians

Last MLB appearance
- September 24, 1933, for the Chicago White Sox

MLB statistics
- Win–loss record: 60–58
- Earned run average: 4.09
- Strikeouts: 305
- Stats at Baseball Reference

Teams
- Cleveland Indians (1924–1931); Chicago White Sox (1933)

Walter Miller (February 28, 1898 – August 20, 1975), known as Jake Miller or J. Walter Miller, was an American professional baseball pitcher who played in Major League Baseball (MLB) from 1924 to 1933. He played mainly for the Cleveland Indians, and one season for the Chicago White Sox. Listed at 6 feet 2 inches (1.88 m) and 170 pounds (77 kg), he threw and batted left-handed.

== Baseball career ==
Miller played five seasons in minor league baseball; 1922–1924 and 1931–1932. He compiled a 39–25 win–loss record in 94 minor league appearances.

Miller's major league career spanned 1924 to 1933, with the exception of 1932 when he did not play in the major leagues. He made his debut with the Cleveland Indians late in the 1924 season, and went on to appear in 174 games (125 starts) with the team through the 1931 season. He recorded a career-high 14 wins during the 1929 season. During his eight seasons with Cleveland, he compiled a 55–52 record with 3.92 ERA while registering 275 strikeouts in 964 innings pitched.

In July 1932, Miller and outfielder Joel Hunt were traded to the St. Louis Cardinals in exchange for outfielder Hal Anderson. Miller appeared in 11 games for the Columbus Red Birds, a Cardinals farm team, but did not pitch in the major leagues for St. Louis.

Miller's final major league season was as a member of the 1933 Chicago White Sox. In 26 games (14 starts) he had a 5.62 ERA with 30 strikeouts in 105 2/3 innings pitched, and a 5–6 record. Overall, in nine major league seasons, Miller had a 60–58 record with 4.09 ERA and recorded 305 strikeouts in 1069 2/3 innings pitched.

== Personal life ==
Miller was born in 1898 in Wagram, Ohio. At age 20, he was living in Pataskala, Ohio, and attending Ohio State University. He briefly served in the United States Army (October to December 1918) during World War I. Miller's entry in the Ohio State yearbook for his senior class noted his major as chemical engineering, that he had played two seasons on the varsity baseball team, and that he was a member of Delta Tau Delta fraternity. In February 1942, he was living in Columbus, Ohio, and working for the Universal Concrete Pipe Company there. He died in Venice, Florida, in 1975 at age 77. A younger brother was fellow major league pitcher Russ Miller (1900–1962).

=== Name ===
Miller's World War I draft registration card listed his name simply as "Walter Miller", which is how he signed it. On his World War II draft registration card, his name was listed and signed as "J. Walter Miller", which is how his name appeared in the college yearbook at Ohio State for his senior class, and how contemporary newspaper reports commonly referred to him. Research by members of the Society for American Baseball Research (SABR) indicates that his full name was Jacob Walter Miller.
