= Alva Bradley =

American baseball executive (1884–1953)

Alva Bradley II
- Born: February 28, 1884; Cleveland, Ohio, U.S.
- Died: March 30, 1953 (aged 69); Delray Beach, Florida, U.S.
- Education: Cornell University
- Occupation: Real estate developer
- Known for: Principal owner of Cleveland Indians

Alva Bradley II (February 28, 1884 – March 30, 1953) was an American businessman and baseball team executive.

== Early life ==
Bradley was born in Cleveland to a prominent family, the eldest of five children of Morris A. Bradley and the former Anna A. Leininger. He was named after his grandfather, Captain Alva Bradley, who also gave inventor Thomas Edison his middle name of Alva. (He was the best friend of Edison's father Samuel.) Alva Bradley was the owner of the Cleveland Indians in the 1940s and helped start what became Case Western Reserve University. Morris Bradley was the only son of Capt. Bradley, inheriting his father's successful shipbuilding company and at one point was one of the largest real estate owners in Cleveland.

Bradley attended the University School of Cleveland and Cornell, along with this brother Charles, who was 20 months younger than Alva, graduating in 1908.

== Professional life ==
He was president of the group that bought the Cleveland Indians in 1927 for $1 million, and which sold the team to Bill Veeck in 1946. While he was the team's president, Bradley was not the majority shareholder. Other members of the ownership group included his brother, Charles C. Bradley, with whom he invested $175,000, John Sherwin Sr. ($300,000), Percy Morgan ($200,000), Newton D. Baker ($25,000), attorney Joseph C. Hostetler ($25,000) and the Van Sweringen brothers ($250,000).

During Bradley's tenure the team signed teenage strikeout king Bob Feller in a controversial move that had to ultimately be resolved by baseball commissioner Kenesaw Mountain Landis. During the 1940 season Indian players, led by Mel Harder and Ken Keltner, came to him demanding that he fire team manager Ossie Vitt. The Indians, who were labeled "Crybabies" for doing so, lost the pennant race on the last day of the season. Bradley went out on a limb by hiring then 25-year-old Lou Boudreau as team manager.

Bradley had a number of other business interests. He owned a real estate company and was president and treasurer of the United States Coal Company. He served on the boards of several Van Sweringen companies, the American Shipbuilding Company, Great Lakes Towing Company, and others, and was chairman of Cleveland Builders Supply Company.

Bradley was married to the former Marguerite Andrews and had four children: a son and three daughters. He is the great great grandfather of University of Louisiana Ragin Cajuns' pitching phenom Buddy Glass.
