= Dick Porter =

American baseball player (1901–1974)

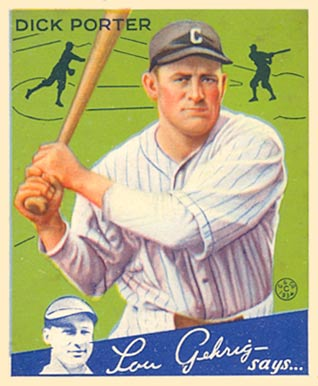
- Outfielder
- Born: December 30, 1901; Princess Anne, Maryland, U.S.
- Died: September 24, 1974 (aged 72); Philadelphia, Pennsylvania, U.S.
- Batted: Left Threw: Right

MLB debut
- April 16, 1929, for the Cleveland Indians

Last MLB appearance
- September 30, 1934, for the Boston Red Sox

MLB statistics
- Batting average: .308
- Home runs: 11
- Runs batted in: 282
- Stats at Baseball Reference

Teams
- Cleveland Indians (1929–1934); Boston Red Sox (1934)

Richard Twilley Porter (December 30, 1901 – September 24, 1974) was an American Major League Baseball outfielder from 1929–1934, for the Cleveland Indians and Boston Red Sox.

In 1930, he batted .350 with 43 doubles and 100 runs scored in only 119 games. He reached career highs in 1932 with 191 hits and 106 runs scored.

In 675 major league games, he had 11 home runs, 282 RBI, scored 426 runs and batted .308 (774-for-2515). Before and after his major league career, he played 14 seasons for three teams in the International League, hitting .328 with 123 home runs. He is a member of the International League Hall of Fame.
