= Bob Seeds =

American baseball player (1907–1993)

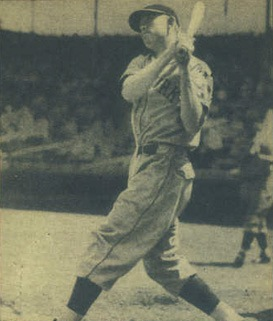
- Outfielder
- Born: February 24, 1907; Ringgold, Texas, U.S.
- Died: October 28, 1993 (aged 86); Erick, Oklahoma, U.S.
- Batted: Right Threw: Right

MLB debut
- April 19, 1930, for the Cleveland Indians

Last MLB appearance
- September 24, 1940, for the New York Giants

MLB statistics
- Batting average: .277
- Home runs: 28
- Runs batted in: 233
- Stats at Baseball Reference

Teams
- Cleveland Indians (1930–1932); Chicago White Sox (1932); Boston Red Sox (1933–1934); Cleveland Indians (1934); New York Yankees (1936); New York Giants (1938–1940)

Career highlights and awards
- World Series champion (1936)

Ira Robert Seeds (February 24, 1907 – October 28, 1993) was an American professional baseball player who played outfield in the Major Leagues from 1930 to 1940. He would play for the Cleveland Indians, Chicago White Sox, New York Giants, New York Yankees, and Boston Red Sox. The well-traveled player was known by the nickname "Suitcase". (Another theory of the origin of the "suitcase" nickname states that he earned the moniker due to his large, "suitcase-like" feet).

Seeds was a member of the 1937 Newark Bears, a farm team of the New York Yankees, known as one of the greatest seasons for a minor league team of all time. Seeds batted .303 with 20 home runs in 1937, and led the Bears with 112 runs batted in. During one weekend of the season, Seeds hit 7 home runs in 10 at-bats, while driving in 17 runs.

In 615 games over 9 seasons in his major league career, Seeds posted a .277 batting average (537-for-1937) with 268 runs, 28 home runs and 233 RBI. He recorded an overall .974 fielding percentage.
