= Lew Fonseca =

American baseball player (1899–1989)

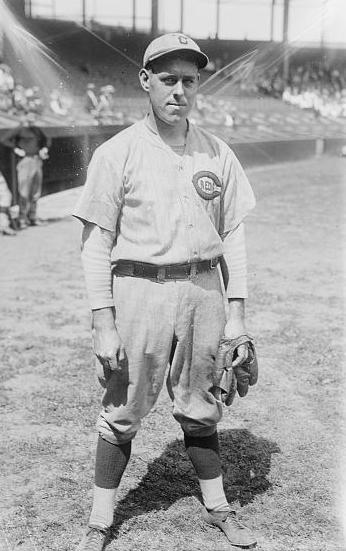
- Fonseca in 1923
- First baseman / Second baseman / Manager
- Born: January 21, 1899; Oakland, California, U.S.
- Died: November 26, 1989 (aged 90); Ely, Iowa, U.S.
- Batted: Right Threw: Right

MLB debut
- April 13, 1921, for the Cincinnati Reds

Last MLB appearance
- September 11, 1933, for the Chicago White Sox

MLB statistics
- Batting average: .316
- Home runs: 31
- Runs batted in: 485
- Managerial record: 120–196
- Winning %: .380
- Stats at Baseball Reference

Teams
- As player: Cincinnati Reds (1921–1924); Philadelphia Phillies (1925); Cleveland Indians (1927–1931); Chicago White Sox (1931–1933); As manager: Chicago White Sox (1932–1934)

Career highlights and awards
- AL batting champion (1929)

Lewis Albert Fonseca (January 21, 1899 – November 26, 1989) was an American professional baseball first baseman, second baseman and manager in Major League Baseball for the Cincinnati Reds, Philadelphia Phillies, Cleveland Indians, and Chicago White Sox.

== Baseball career ==
While not a power hitter, he hit for average and was a good contact hitter for most of his career. He topped the .300 mark six times, with his best season coming in 1929 with the Indians, when he hit .369 to win the American League batting title, after coming off a 1928 season in which he broke his leg. His success was short-lived, however, as he broke his arm in 1930, and a torn ligament in his leg prematurely ended his playing career.

In a 12-year major league career, Fonseca posted a .316 batting average (1075-3404), scoring 518 runs, hitting 31 home runs, and compiling 485 RBI in 937 games played. His on-base percentage was .355 and slugging percentage was .432. His career fielding percentage overall was .983.

Fonseca was one of the first to use film in analyzing baseball games and finding flaws in players. It is said that his interest with cameras began while shooting Slide, Kelly, Slide in 1927. As manager of the Chicago White Sox, he used film extensively.

== After baseball ==
After retiring from playing the game, Fonseca teamed with Charley Grimm to call Chicago White Sox and Chicago Cubs radio broadcasts on station WJJD in 1939 in 1940, then was employed as director of promotions for both major leagues. Fonseca worked on World Series highlight films from their inception in 1943 through 1969, as an editor and director, and narrated the World Series films from 1949-53 and 1955-58 (Jack Brickhouse narrated the 1954 World Series film). Television sportscaster Bob Costas wrote of Fonseca's narration: "[his] vocal stylings were somewhat less than mellifluous, but still endlessly entertaining." Fonseca was batting coach for the Chicago Cubs for many years, until quite late in life.

== Personal life ==
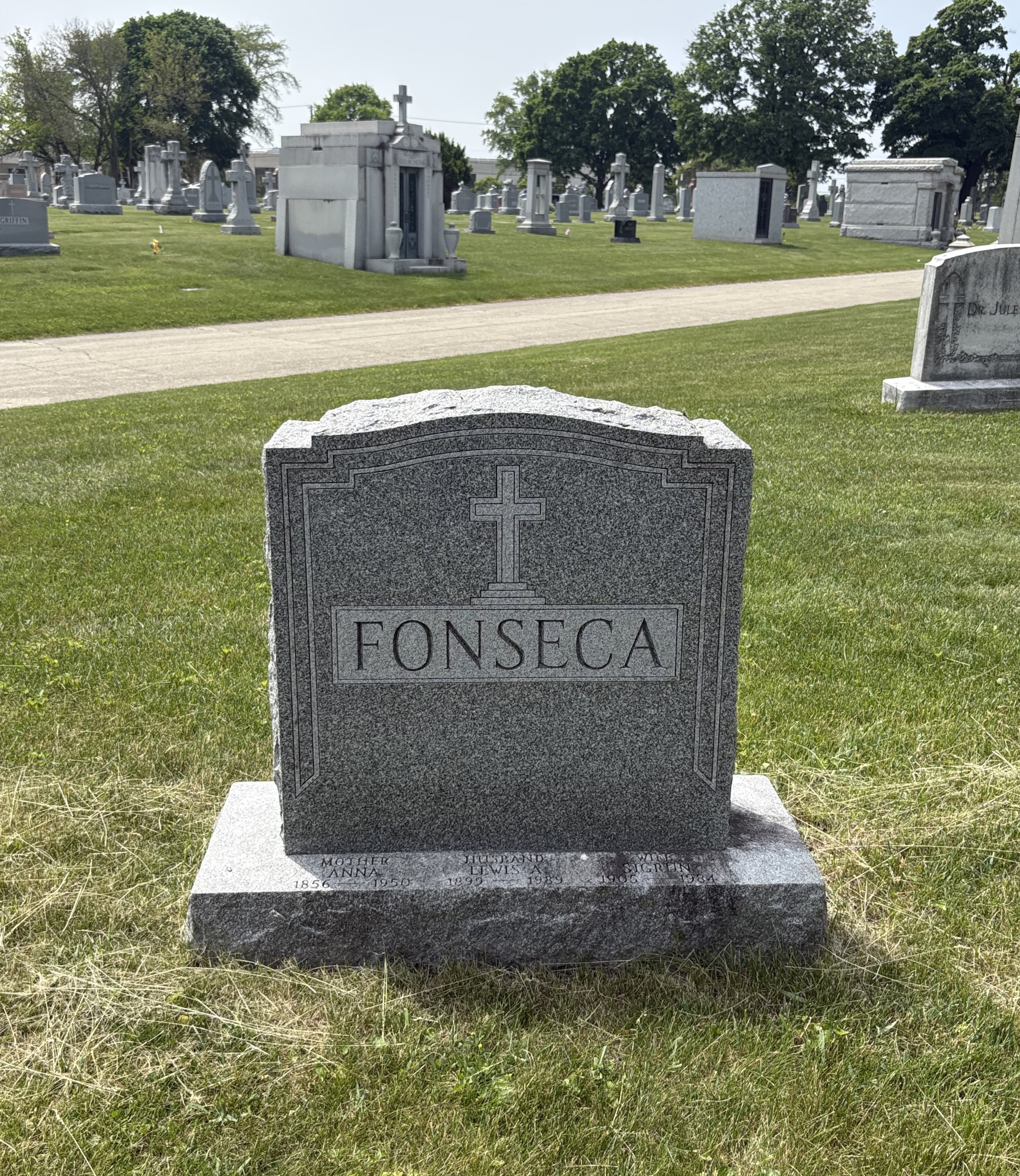
Fonseca's grave at All Saints Cemetery

His daughter Carolynn was a talented actress who worked mostly out of Rome, Italy.

Fonseca died in Ely, Iowa at age 90. He was buried at All Saints Cemetery in Des Plaines, Illinois.

== Managerial record ==
Team	Year	Regular season					Postseason			
Team	Year	Games	Won	Lost	Win %	Finish	Won	Lost	Win %	Result
CWS	1932	151	49	102	.325	7th in AL	–	–	–	–
CWS	1933	150	67	83	.447	6th in AL	–	–	–	–
CWS	1934	15	4	11	.267	fired	–	–	–	–
Total		316	120	196	.380		0	0	–	

== See also ==
- List of Major League Baseball batting champions
- List of Major League Baseball player-managers
