= Willis Hudlin =

American baseball player (1906–2002)

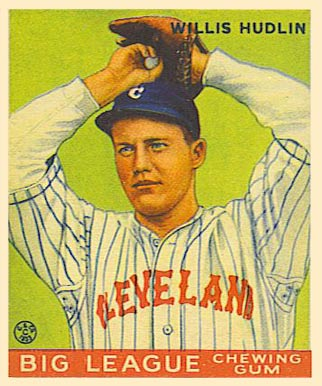
- Pitcher
- Born: May 23, 1906; Wagoner, Oklahoma, U.S.
- Died: August 5, 2002 (aged 96); Little Rock, Arkansas, U.S.
- Batted: Right Threw: Right

MLB debut
- August 15, 1926, for the Cleveland Indians

Last MLB appearance
- August 31, 1944, for the St. Louis Browns

MLB statistics
- Win–loss record: 158–156
- Earned run average: 4.41
- Strikeouts: 677
- Stats at Baseball Reference

Teams
- Cleveland Indians (1926–1940); Washington Senators (1940); New York Giants (1940); St. Louis Browns (1940, 1944)

George Willis Hudlin (May 23, 1906 – August 5, 2002) was an American Major League Baseball pitcher for, most notably, the Cleveland Indians from 1926 to 1940. Hudlin did not pitch more than 10 games with any other team, although he played with three others.

In 1940, Hudlin became one of the few players to compete on four different major league teams in the same year (Cleveland Indians, Washington Senators, New York Giants, and the St. Louis Browns).

Hudlin's career statistics include a 158–156 record, with a 4.41 ERA. He had 677 strikeouts in 2613 1/3 career innings pitched.

Hudlin was the pitcher who gave up Babe Ruth's 500th home run.

Hudlin was a good hitting pitcher in his career, recording a .201 batting average (180-for-894) with 76 runs, 5 home runs, 69 RBI and 52 bases on balls.

Hudlin's pitch selection included a well-known sinker, a fastball, curveball and a changeup. He occasionally threw sidearm or with an underhand "dip of the wrist", though he threw overhand most often.

After Hudlin finished playing in the majors, he was a manager for the minor league Little Rock Travelers and pitching coach for the Detroit Tigers under skippers Jack Tighe, Bill Norman and Jimmy Dykes (1957–59).

Hudlin later became a scout for the New York Yankees, for whom he even scouted his own son, James, who was given a contract to play professionally, but was drafted to serve in the Vietnam War. James Hudlin's pitch selection was a knuckleball, slider, curveball, and sinker, as well as a two-seam fastball which topped out at 102 mph (164 km/h).

Willis Hudlin was a member of the Army Air Forces during World War II as a flight instructor. He died in Little Rock, Arkansas, at the age of 96, and was interred in Hazelhurst Cemetery, Hazelhursrt, Copiah County, Mississippi.

Sporting positions
Preceded by n/a	Detroit Tigers pitching coach 1957–1959	Succeeded by Tom Ferrick
