= 1932 Chicago White Sox season =

1932 Chicago White Sox
- League: American League
- Ballpark: Comiskey Park
- City: Chicago
- Owners: J. Louis Comiskey
- General manager: Harry Grabiner
- Managers: Lew Fonseca
- Radio: WGN (Bob Elson); WJKS (Johnny O'Hara); WMAQ (Hal Totten)

The 1932 Chicago White Sox season was the White Sox's 32nd season in the major leagues, and their 33rd season overall. They finished with a record of 49–102, good enough for seventh place in the American League, 56.5 games behind the first place New York Yankees. The 1932 season was their second worst ever (by winning percentage).

== Offseason ==
- September 30, 1931: Carey Selph was drafted by the White Sox from the St. Louis Cardinals in the 1931 rule 5 draft.

== Regular season ==
=== Season standings ===
American League
Team	W	L	Pct.	GB	Home	Road
New York Yankees	107	47	.695	—	62‍–‍15	45‍–‍32
Philadelphia Athletics	94	60	.610	13	51‍–‍26	43‍–‍34
Washington Senators	93	61	.604	14	51‍–‍26	42‍–‍35
Cleveland Indians	87	65	.572	19	43‍–‍33	44‍–‍32
Detroit Tigers	76	75	.503	29½	42‍–‍34	34‍–‍41
St. Louis Browns	63	91	.409	44	33‍–‍42	30‍–‍49
Chicago White Sox	49	102	.325	56½	28‍–‍49	21‍–‍53
Boston Red Sox	43	111	.279	64	27‍–‍50	16‍–‍61

=== Record vs. opponents ===
1932 American League record Sources:
Team	BOS	CWS	CLE	DET	NYY	PHA	SLB	WSH
Boston	—	12–10	4–18	6–16	5–17	4–18	7–15	5–17
Chicago	10–12	—	7–14–1	8–12	5–17	7–15	8–14	4–18
Cleveland	18–4	14–7–1	—	11–10	7–15	10–12	16–6	11–11
Detroit	16–6	12–8	10–11	—	5–17–2	7–15	15–7	11–11
New York	17–5	17–5	15–7	17–5–2	—	14–8	16–6	11–11
Philadelphia	18–4	15–7	12–10	15–7	8–14	—	16–6	10–12
St. Louis	15–7	14–8	6–16	7–15	6–16	6–16	—	9–13
Washington	17–5	18–4	11–11	11–11	11–11	12–10	13–9	—

=== Notable transactions ===
- April 27, 1932: Bruce Campbell and Bump Hadley were traded by the White Sox to the St. Louis Browns for Red Kress.
- September 9, 1932: Chad Kimsey was purchased by the White Sox from the St. Louis Browns.
- September 11, 1932: The White Sox traded players to be named later to the St. Louis Cardinals for Evar Swanson. The White Sox completed the deal by sending Carey Selph and Jack Rothrock to the Cardinals on November 2.
- September 28, 1932: Al Simmons was purchased by the White Sox from the Philadelphia Athletics.

=== Roster ===
1932 Chicago White Sox
Roster
Pitchers: -- Les Bartholomew; 15 Charlie Biggs; 23,39 Grant Bowler; 15 Pat Caraway; 17 Bill Chamberlain; 9,32 Pete Daglia; 14 Art Evans; 19 Red Faber; 39 Clarence Fieber; 18 Vic Frazier; 14 Phil Gallivan; 26 Milt Gaston; 39,45 Paul Gregory; 24 Bump Hadley; 25 Sam Jones; 35 Chad Kimsey; 23 Fabian Kowalik; 16 Ted Lyons; 23 Hal McKain; 46 Jim Moore; 29,35 Bob Poser; -- Art Smith; 17 Tommy Thomas; 18 Ed Walsh; 15 Archie Wise	Catchers: 3 Charlie Berry; 1 Frank Grube; 2 Bennie Tate; Infielders: 8 Luke Appling; 4 Lu Blue; -- Bill Cissell; 36 Charlie English; 5 Jackie Hayes; -- Greg Mulleavy; 7 Carey Selph; 49 Billy Sullivan	Outfielders: -- Hal Anderson; -- Bruce Campbell; 12 Lew Fonseca; 13 Bob Fothergill; 34 Liz Funk; 6 Johnny Hodapp; 3 Smead Jolley; 24 Red Kress; 27 Bill Norman; 14 Jack Rothrock; 37 Bob Seeds; -- Mel Simons; -- Evar Swanson; -- Johnny Watwood	Manager: 12 Lew Fonseca; Coaches: 27 Johnny Butler; 28 Bill Cunningham

== Player stats ==
=== Batting ===
==== Starters by position ====
Note: Pos = Position; G = Games played; AB = At bats; H = Hits; Avg. = Batting average; HR = Home runs; RBI = Runs batted in

Pos	Player	G	AB	H	Avg.	HR	RBI
C	Frank Grube	93	277	78	.282	0	31
1B	Lu Blue	112	373	93	.249	0	43
2B	Jackie Hayes	117	475	122	.257	2	54
SS	Luke Appling	139	489	134	.274	3	63
3B	Carey Selph	116	396	112	.283	0	51
OF	Bob Seeds	116	434	126	.290	2	45
OF	Bob Fothergill	116	346	102	.295	7	50
OF	Liz Funk	122	440	114	.259	2	40

==== Other batters ====
Note: G = Games played; AB = At bats; H = Hits; Avg. = Batting average; HR = Home runs; RBI = Runs batted in

Player	G	AB	H	Avg.	HR	RBI
Red Kress	135	515	147	.285	9	57
Billy Sullivan	93	307	97	.316	1	45
Charlie Berry	72	226	69	.305	4	31
Johnny Hodapp	68	176	40	.227	3	20
Jack Rothrock	39	64	12	.188	0	6
Charlie English	24	63	20	.317	1	8
Evar Swanson	14	52	16	.308	0	8
Johnny Watwood	13	49	15	.306	0	0
Bill Norman	13	48	11	.229	0	2
Bill Cissell	12	43	11	.256	1	5
Smead Jolley	12	42	15	.357	0	7
Lew Fonseca	18	37	5	.135	0	6
Hal Anderson	9	32	8	.250	0	2
Bruce Campbell	7	18	4	.222	0	2
Fabian Kowalik	6	13	5	.385	0	2
Bennie Tate	4	10	1	.100	0	0
Mel Simons	7	5	0	.000	0	0
Greg Mulleavy	1	3	0	.000	0	0

=== Pitching ===
==== Starting pitchers ====
Note: G = Games pitched; IP = Innings pitched; W = Wins; L = Losses; ERA = Earned run average; SO = Strikeouts

Player	G	IP	W	L	ERA	SO
Ted Lyons	33	230.2	10	15	3.28	58
Sam Jones	30	200.1	10	15	4.22	64
Milt Gaston	28	166.2	7	17	4.00	44
Vic Frazier	29	146.0	3	13	6.23	33
Ed Walsh	4	20.1	0	2	8.41	7

==== Other pitchers ====
Note: G = Games pitched; IP = Innings pitched; W = Wins; L = Losses; ERA = Earned run average; SO = Strikeouts

Player	G	IP	W	L	ERA	SO
Paul Gregory	33	117.2	5	3	4.51	39
Pat Caraway	19	64.2	2	6	6.82	13
Pete Daglia	12	50.0	2	4	5.76	16
Tommy Thomas	12	43.2	3	3	6.18	11
Bill Chamberlain	12	41.1	0	5	4.57	11
Phil Gallivan	13	33.1	1	3	7.56	12
Charlie Biggs	6	24.2	1	1	6.93	1
Bump Hadley	3	18.2	1	1	3.86	13
Fabian Kowalik	2	10.1	0	1	6.97	2
Art Smith	3	7.0	0	1	11.57	1

==== Relief pitchers ====
Note: G = Games pitched; W = Wins; L = Losses; SV = Saves; ERA = Earned run average; SO = Strikeouts

Player	G	W	L	SV	ERA	SO
Red Faber	42	2	11	5	3.74	26
Hal McKain	8	0	0	0	11.12	7
Art Evans	7	0	0	0	3.00	6
Chad Kimsey	7	1	1	2	2.45	6
Grant Bowler	4	0	0	0	15.63	2
Clarence Fieber	3	1	0	0	1.69	1
Les Bartholomew	3	0	0	0	5.06	1
Archie Wise	2	0	0	0	4.91	2
Jim Moore	1	0	0	0	0.00	2
Lew Fonseca	1	0	0	0	0.00	0
Bob Poser	1	0	0	0	27.00	1

== Farm system ==
Level	Team	League	Manager
D	Waterloo Hawks	Mississippi Valley League	Doc Bennett
