= 1933 Philadelphia Athletics season =

1933 Philadelphia Athletics
- League: American League
- Ballpark: Shibe Park
- City: Philadelphia
- Record: 79–72 (.523)
- League place: 3rd
- Owners: Connie Mack, Tom Shibe and John Shibe
- Managers: Connie Mack

The 1933 Philadelphia Athletics season involved the A's finishing third in the American League with a record of 79 wins and 72 losses. Jimmie Foxx became the first player to win two American League MVP Awards.

== Regular season ==
On August 14, 1933, Jimmie Foxx hit for the cycle. Part of the cycle included hitting a grand slam. During a two-week span, Mickey Cochrane, Jimmie Foxx and Pinky Higgins all hit for the cycle during the season.

The Athletics played their first ever night game on September 22, 1933 in a mid-season exhibition at the 44th and Parkside Ballpark in West Philadelphia, defeating a team of the city league's best semi-professional players by a score of 7 to 2. It was estimated that 6,000 fans packed the ballpark, and another 5,000 were turned away at the gate. Foxx went 1 for 3 for the A's before leaving the game in the fifth inning.

=== Season standings ===
American League
Team	W	L	Pct.	GB	Home	Road
Washington Senators	99	53	.651	—	46‍–‍30	53‍–‍23
New York Yankees	91	59	.607	7	51‍–‍23	40‍–‍36
Philadelphia Athletics	79	72	.523	19½	46‍–‍29	33‍–‍43
Cleveland Indians	75	76	.497	23½	45‍–‍32	30‍–‍44
Detroit Tigers	75	79	.487	25	43‍–‍35	32‍–‍44
Chicago White Sox	67	83	.447	31	35‍–‍41	32‍–‍42
Boston Red Sox	63	86	.423	34½	32‍–‍40	31‍–‍46
St. Louis Browns	55	96	.364	43½	30‍–‍46	25‍–‍50

=== Record vs. opponents ===
1933 American League record Sources:
Team	BOS	CWS	CLE	DET	NYY	PHA	SLB	WSH
Boston	—	11–7	6–16	11–11	8–14	14–8	9–13	4–17
Chicago	7–11	—	9–13	10–12	7–15–1	12–10	15–7	7–15
Cleveland	16–6	13–9	—	10–12	7–13	6–16	15–7	8–13
Detroit	11–11	12–10	12–10	—	7–15	11–11	14–8–1	8–14
New York	14–8	15–7–1	13–7	15–7	—	12–9	14–7–1	8–14
Philadelphia	8–14	10–12	16–6	11–11	9–12	—	14–6	11–11–1
St. Louis	13–9	7–15	7–15	8–14–1	7–14–1	6–14	—	7–15
Washington	17–4	15–7	13–8	14–8	14–8	11–11–1	15–7	—

=== Roster ===
1933 Philadelphia Athletics
Roster
Pitchers: 20 Dick Barrett; 16 Sugar Cain; 14 Gowell Claset; 18 Bobby Coombs; 20 Bill Dietrich; 11 George Earnshaw; 19 Tony Freitas; 10 Lefty Grove; 15 Roy Mahaffey; 46 Johnny Marcum; 21 Hank McDonald; 17 Tim McKeithan; 27 Jim Peterson; -- Emil Roy; 12 Rube Walberg; -- Hank Winston	Catchers: 2 Mickey Cochrane; -- Frankie Hayes; 21 Ed Madjeski; Infielders: 4 Max Bishop; 24 Ed Cihocki; 3 Jimmie Foxx; 5 Pinky Higgins; 6 Eric McNair; 23 Dib Williams	Outfielders: 25 Ed Coleman; 8 Doc Cramer; 7 Lou Finney; 26 Bob Johnson; 9 Bing Miller; -- Joe Zapustas	Manager: Connie Mack; Coaches: 33 Lena Blackburne; 32 Earle Mack; 31 Eddie Rommel

== Player stats ==
=== Batting ===
==== Starters by position ====
Note: Pos = Position; G = Games played; AB = At bats; H = Hits; Avg. = Batting average; HR = Home runs; RBI = Runs batted in

Pos	Player	G	AB	H	Avg.	HR	RBI
C	Mickey Cochrane	130	429	138	.322	15	60
1B	Jimmie Foxx	149	573	204	.356	48	163
2B	Max Bishop	117	391	115	.294	4	42
SS	Dib Williams	115	408	118	.289	11	73
3B	Pinky Higgins	152	567	178	.314	13	99
OF	Doc Cramer	152	661	195	.295	8	75
OF	Ed Coleman	102	388	109	.281	6	68
OF	Bob Johnson	142	535	155	.290	21	93

==== Other batters ====
Note: G = Games played; AB = At bats; H = Hits; Avg. = Batting average; HR = Home runs; RBI = Runs batted in

Player	G	AB	H	Avg.	HR	RBI
Eric McNair	89	310	81	.261	7	48
Lou Finney	74	240	64	.267	3	32
Ed Madjeski	51	142	40	.282	0	17
Bing Miller	67	120	33	.275	2	17
Ed Cihocki	33	97	14	.144	0	9
Frankie Hayes	3	5	0	.000	0	0
Joe Zapustas	2	5	1	.200	0	0

=== Pitching ===
==== Starting pitchers ====
Note: G = Games pitched; IP = Innings pitched; W = Wins; L = Losses; ERA = Earned run average; SO = Strikeouts

Player	G	IP	W	L	ERA	SO
Lefty Grove	45	275.1	24	8	3.20	114
Sugar Cain	38	218.0	13	12	4.25	43
Roy Mahaffey	33	179.1	13	10	5.17	66
George Earnshaw	21	117.2	5	10	5.97	37
Johnny Marcum	5	37.0	3	2	1.95	14
Emil Roy	1	2.1	0	1	27.00	3

==== Other pitchers ====
Note: G = Games pitched; IP = Innings pitched; W = Wins; L = Losses; ERA = Earned run average; SO = Strikeouts

Player	G	IP	W	L	ERA	SO
Rube Walberg	40	201.0	9	13	4.88	68
Jim Peterson	32	90.2	2	5	4.96	18
Dick Barrett	15	70.1	4	4	5.76	26
Tony Freitas	19	64.1	2	4	7.27	15
Bill Dietrich	8	17.0	0	1	5.82	4
Hank McDonald	4	12.1	1	1	5.11	1
Tim McKeithan	3	9.0	1	0	4.00	3

==== Relief pitchers ====
Note: G = Games pitched; W = Wins; L = Losses; SV = Saves; ERA = Earned run average; SO = Strikeouts

Player	G	W	L	SV	ERA	SO
Bobby Coombs	21	0	1	2	7.47	8
Gowell Claset	8	2	0	0	9.53	1
Hank Winston	1	0	0	0	6.75	2

== Farm system ==
Level	Team	League	Manager
AA	Portland Beavers	Pacific Coast League	Spencer Abbott
A	Williamsport Grays	New York–Pennsylvania League	Mike McNally
