= 1932 Philadelphia Athletics season =

1932 Philadelphia Athletics
- League: American League
- Ballpark: Shibe Park
- City: Philadelphia
- Record: 94–60 (.610)
- League place: 2nd
- Owners: Connie Mack, Tom Shibe and John Shibe
- Managers: Connie Mack

The 1932 Philadelphia Athletics season involved the A's finishing second in the American League with a record of 94 wins and 60 losses. The team finished 13 games behind the New York Yankees, breaking their streak of three straight AL championships.

== Regular season ==
Jimmie Foxx had an impressive offensive season – 58 home runs, 169 RBI, and a .364 batting average – and missed the triple crown by just three BA points. He was voted the American League Most Valuable Player. Mickey Cochrane became the first catcher in Major League Baseball history to score 100 runs and have 100 RBI in the same season.

=== Season standings ===
American League
Team	W	L	Pct.	GB	Home	Road
New York Yankees	107	47	.695	—	62‍–‍15	45‍–‍32
Philadelphia Athletics	94	60	.610	13	51‍–‍26	43‍–‍34
Washington Senators	93	61	.604	14	51‍–‍26	42‍–‍35
Cleveland Indians	87	65	.572	19	43‍–‍33	44‍–‍32
Detroit Tigers	76	75	.503	29½	42‍–‍34	34‍–‍41
St. Louis Browns	63	91	.409	44	33‍–‍42	30‍–‍49
Chicago White Sox	49	102	.325	56½	28‍–‍49	21‍–‍53
Boston Red Sox	43	111	.279	64	27‍–‍50	16‍–‍61

=== Record vs. opponents ===
1932 American League record Sources:
Team	BOS	CWS	CLE	DET	NYY	PHA	SLB	WSH
Boston	—	12–10	4–18	6–16	5–17	4–18	7–15	5–17
Chicago	10–12	—	7–14–1	8–12	5–17	7–15	8–14	4–18
Cleveland	18–4	14–7–1	—	11–10	7–15	10–12	16–6	11–11
Detroit	16–6	12–8	10–11	—	5–17–2	7–15	15–7	11–11
New York	17–5	17–5	15–7	17–5–2	—	14–8	16–6	11–11
Philadelphia	18–4	15–7	12–10	15–7	8–14	—	16–6	10–12
St. Louis	15–7	14–8	6–16	7–15	6–16	6–16	—	9–13
Washington	17–5	18–4	11–11	11–11	11–11	12–10	13–9	—

=== Notable transactions ===
- September 28, 1932: Al Simmons was purchased from the Athletics by the Chicago White Sox.

=== Roster ===
1932 Philadelphia Athletics
Roster
Pitchers: 17 Joe Bowman; 16 Sugar Cain; 19 Jimmie DeShong; 11 George Earnshaw; 19 Tony Freitas; 10 Lefty Grove; 18 Lew Krausse; 15 Roy Mahaffey; 16,24 Tim McKeithan; 14 Eddie Rommel; 17 Irv Stein; 12 Rube Walberg	Catchers: 2 Mickey Cochrane; 20 Johnnie Heving; 21 Ed Madjeski; Infielders: 4 Max Bishop; 24 Joe Boley; 5 Jimmy Dykes; 3 Jimmie Foxx; 22 Eric McNair; 24 Al Reiss; 23 Oscar Roettger; 6,23 Dib Williams	Outfielders: 17 Ed Coleman; 26 Doc Cramer; 8 Mule Haas; 23 John Jones; 9 Bing Miller; 7 Al Simmons; Other batters: 42 Ed Cihocki	Manager: Connie Mack; Coaches: 31 Eddie Collins; 30 Kid Gleason; 32 Earle Mack

== Player stats ==
=== Batting ===
==== Starters by position ====
Note: Pos = Position; G = Games played; AB = At bats; H = Hits; Avg. = Batting average; HR = Home runs; RBI = Runs batted in

Pos	Player	G	AB	H	Avg.	HR	RBI
C	Mickey Cochrane	139	518	160	.349	23	112
1B	Jimmie Foxx	154	585	213	.364	58	169
2B	Max Bishop	114	409	104	.254	5	37
3B	Jimmy Dykes	153	558	148	.265	7	90
SS	Eric McNair	135	554	158	.285	18	95
OF	Al Simmons	154	670	216	.322	35	151
OF	Mule Haas	143	558	170	.305	6	65
OF	Doc Cramer	92	384	129	.336	3	46

==== Other batters ====
Note: G = Games played; AB = At bats; H = Hits; Avg. = Batting average; HR = Home runs; RBI = Runs batted in

Player	G	AB	H	Avg.	HR	RBI
Bing Miller	95	305	90	.295	7	58
Dib Williams	62	215	54	.251	4	24
Johnnie Heving	33	77	21	.273	0	10
Ed Coleman	26	73	25	.342	1	13
Oscar Roettger	26	60	14	.233	0	6
Ed Madjeski	17	35	8	.229	0	3
Joe Boley	10	34	7	.206	0	4
John Jones	4	6	1	.167	0	0
Al Reiss	9	5	1	.200	0	1
Ed Cihocki	1	1	0	.000	0	0

=== Pitching ===
==== Starting pitchers ====
Note: G = Games pitched; IP = Innings pitched; W = Wins; L = Losses; ERA = Earned run average; SO = Strikeouts

Player	G	IP	W	L	ERA	SO
Lefty Grove	44	291.2	25	10	2.84	188
Rube Walberg	42	272.0	17	10	4.73	96
George Earnshaw	36	245.1	19	13	4.77	109
Roy Mahaffey	37	222.2	13	13	5.09	106
Tony Freitas	23	150.1	12	5	3.83	31

==== Other pitchers ====
Note: G = Games pitched; IP = Innings pitched; W = Wins; L = Losses; ERA = Earned run average; SO = Strikeouts

Player	G	IP	W	L	ERA	SO
Lew Krausse	20	57.0	4	1	4.58	16
Sugar Cain	10	45.0	3	4	5.00	24
Tim McKeithan	4	12.2	0	1	7.11	0

==== Relief pitchers ====
Note: G = Games pitched; W = Wins; L = Losses; SV = Saves; ERA = Earned run average; SO = Strikeouts

Player	G	W	L	SV	ERA	SO
Eddie Rommel	17	1	2	2	5.51	16
Joe Bowman	7	0	1	0	8.18	4
Jimmie DeShong	6	0	0	0	11.70	5
Irv Stein	1	0	0	0	12.00	0

== Awards and honors ==
=== League top five finishers ===
Jimmie Foxx

- AL leader in home runs (58)
- AL leader in RBI (169)
- AL leader in runs scored (151)
- AL leader in slugging percentage (.749)
- #2 in AL in batting average (.364)
- #2 in AL in on-base percentage (.469)

Lefty Grove

- AL leader in ERA (2.84)
- #2 in AL in wins (25)
- #2 in AL in strikeouts (188)

Al Simmons

- #2 in AL in RBI (151)
- #2 in AL in runs scored (144)
- #3 in AL in home runs (35)

== Farm system ==
Level	Team	League	Manager
AA	Portland Beavers	Pacific Coast League	Spencer Abbott

LEAGUE CHAMPIONS: Portland

== See also ==
- Philadelphia Athletics 18, Cleveland Indians 17 (1932) Record-setting game from this season
