= 1932 Washington Senators season =

1932 Washington Senators
- League: American League
- Ballpark: Griffith Stadium
- City: Washington, D.C.
- Record: 93–61 (.604)
- League place: 3rd
- Owners: Clark Griffith and William Richardson
- Managers: Walter Johnson

The 1932 Washington Senators won 93 games, lost 61, and finished in third place in the American League. They were managed by Walter Johnson and played home games at Griffith Stadium.

== Regular season ==
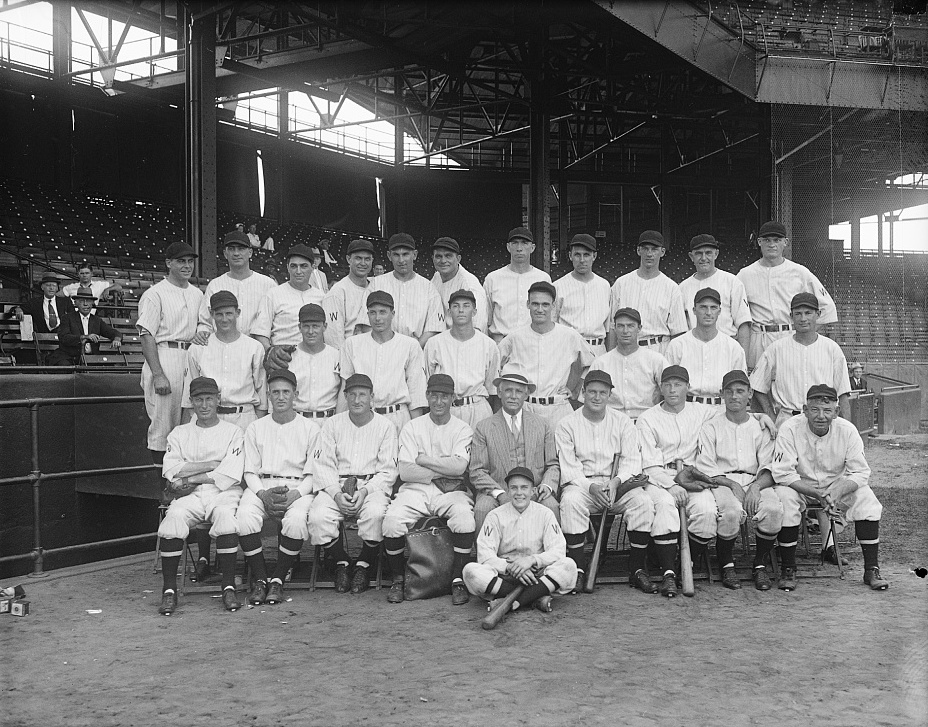
The 1932 Washington Senators team photo.

The 1932 Washington Senators were the last team in the 20th century to have 100 triples in one season.

=== Season standings ===
American League
Team	W	L	Pct.	GB	Home	Road
New York Yankees	107	47	.695	—	62‍–‍15	45‍–‍32
Philadelphia Athletics	94	60	.610	13	51‍–‍26	43‍–‍34
Washington Senators	93	61	.604	14	51‍–‍26	42‍–‍35
Cleveland Indians	87	65	.572	19	43‍–‍33	44‍–‍32
Detroit Tigers	76	75	.503	29½	42‍–‍34	34‍–‍41
St. Louis Browns	63	91	.409	44	33‍–‍42	30‍–‍49
Chicago White Sox	49	102	.325	56½	28‍–‍49	21‍–‍53
Boston Red Sox	43	111	.279	64	27‍–‍50	16‍–‍61

=== Record vs. opponents ===
1932 American League record Sources:
Team	BOS	CWS	CLE	DET	NYY	PHA	SLB	WSH
Boston	—	12–10	4–18	6–16	5–17	4–18	7–15	5–17
Chicago	10–12	—	7–14–1	8–12	5–17	7–15	8–14	4–18
Cleveland	18–4	14–7–1	—	11–10	7–15	10–12	16–6	11–11
Detroit	16–6	12–8	10–11	—	5–17–2	7–15	15–7	11–11
New York	17–5	17–5	15–7	17–5–2	—	14–8	16–6	11–11
Philadelphia	18–4	15–7	12–10	15–7	8–14	—	16–6	10–12
St. Louis	15–7	14–8	6–16	7–15	6–16	6–16	—	9–13
Washington	17–5	18–4	11–11	11–11	11–11	12–10	13–9	—

=== Roster ===
1932 Washington Senators
Roster
Pitchers: 14 Lloyd Brown; 17,19 Bobby Burke; 15 Dick Coffman; 12 Alvin Crowder; 31 Ed Edelen; 15 Carl Fischer; 19 Bob Friedrichs; 11 Firpo Marberry; 17 Bill McAfee; 18 Frank Ragland; 20 Bud Thomas; 20 Tommy Thomas; 16 Monte Weaver	Catchers: 9 Moe Berg; 10 Howard Maple; 8 Roy Spencer; Infielders: 7 Ossie Bluege; 4 Joe Cronin; 6 Joe Judge; 23 John Kerr; -- Wes Kingdon; 21 Joe Kuhel; 20 Jim McLeod; -- Danny Musser; 1 Buddy Myer	Outfielders: 24 Dave Harris; 2 Heinie Manush; 5 Carl Reynolds; 22 Sam Rice; 3 Sam West	Manager: 25 Walter Johnson; Coaches: 27 Eddie Ainsmith; 28 Nick Altrock; 26 Patsy Gharrity; 29 Al Schacht

== Player stats ==
=== Batting ===
==== Starters by position ====
Note: Pos = Position; G = Games played; AB = At bats; H = Hits; Avg. = Batting average; HR = Home runs; RBI = Runs batted in

Pos	Player	G	AB	H	Avg.	HR	RBI
C	Roy Spencer	102	317	78	.246	1	41
1B	Joe Kuhel	101	347	101	.291	4	52
2B	Buddy Myer	143	577	161	.279	5	52
SS	Joe Cronin	143	557	177	.318	6	116
3B	Ossie Bluege	149	507	131	.258	5	64
OF	Carl Reynolds	102	406	124	.305	9	63
OF	Heinie Manush	149	625	214	.342	14	116
OF	Sam West	146	554	159	.287	6	83

==== Other batters ====
Note: G = Games played; AB = At bats; H = Hits; Avg. = Batting average; HR = Home runs; RBI = Runs batted in

Player	G	AB	H	Avg.	HR	RBI
Joe Judge	82	291	75	.258	3	29
Sam Rice	106	288	93	.323	1	34
Moe Berg	75	195	46	.236	1	26
Dave Harris	81	156	51	.327	6	29
John Kerr	51	132	36	.273	0	15
Howard Maple	44	41	10	.244	0	7
Wes Kingdon	18	34	11	.324	0	3
Danny Musser	1	2	1	.500	0	0
Jim McLeod	1	0	0	----	0	0

=== Pitching ===
==== Starting pitchers ====
Note: G = Games pitched; IP = Innings pitched; W = Wins; L = Losses; ERA = Earned run average; SO = Strikeouts

Player	G	IP	W	L	ERA	SO
General Crowder	50	327.0	26	13	3.33	103
Monte Weaver	43	234.0	22	10	4.08	83
Tommy Thomas	18	117.0	8	7	3.54	36

==== Other pitchers ====
Note: G = Games pitched; IP = Innings pitched; W = Wins; L = Losses; ERA = Earned run average; SO = Strikeouts

Player	G	IP	W	L	ERA	SO
Lloyd Brown	46	202.2	15	12	4.44	53
Firpo Marberry	54	197.2	8	4	4.01	66
Bobby Burke	22	91.0	3	6	5.14	32
Dick Coffman	22	76.1	1	6	4.83	17
Carl Fischer	12	50.2	3	2	4.97	23
Bill McAfee	8	41.1	6	1	3.92	10

==== Relief pitchers ====
Note: G = Games pitched; W = Wins; L = Losses; SV = Saves; ERA = Earned run average; SO = Strikeouts

Player	G	W	L	SV	ERA	SO
Frank Ragland	12	1	0	0	7.41	11
Bob Friedrichs	2	0	0	0	11.25	2
Bud Thomas	2	0	0	0	0.00	1
Ed Edelen	2	0	0	0	27.00	0

== Farm system ==
Level	Team	League	Manager
A	Chattanooga Lookouts	Southern Association	Bert Niehoff
