= 1932 Detroit Tigers season =

Major League Baseball season

1932 Detroit Tigers
- League: American League
- Ballpark: Navin Field
- City: Detroit, Michigan
- Record: 76–75 (.503)
- League place: 5th
- Owners: Frank Navin
- Managers: Bucky Harris
- Radio: WWJ (AM) (Ty Tyson)

The 1932 Detroit Tigers season ended with them placing fifth in the American League with a record of 76–75, 29½ games behind the New York Yankees.

== Regular season ==
=== Season standings ===
American League
| Team | W | L | Pct. | GB | Home | Road |
|---|---|---|---|---|---|---|
| New York Yankees | 107 | 47 | .695 | — | 62‍–‍15 | 45‍–‍32 |
| Philadelphia Athletics | 94 | 60 | .610 | 13 | 51‍–‍26 | 43‍–‍34 |
| Washington Senators | 93 | 61 | .604 | 14 | 51‍–‍26 | 42‍–‍35 |
| Cleveland Indians | 87 | 65 | .572 | 19 | 43‍–‍33 | 44‍–‍32 |
| Detroit Tigers | 76 | 75 | .503 | 29½ | 42‍–‍34 | 34‍–‍41 |
| St. Louis Browns | 63 | 91 | .409 | 44 | 33‍–‍42 | 30‍–‍49 |
| Chicago White Sox | 49 | 102 | .325 | 56½ | 28‍–‍49 | 21‍–‍53 |
| Boston Red Sox | 43 | 111 | .279 | 64 | 27‍–‍50 | 16‍–‍61 |

=== Record vs. opponents ===
1932 American League record Sources:
| Team | BOS | CWS | CLE | DET | NYY | PHA | SLB | WSH |
|---|---|---|---|---|---|---|---|---|
| Boston | — | 12–10 | 4–18 | 6–16 | 5–17 | 4–18 | 7–15 | 5–17 |
| Chicago | 10–12 | — | 7–14–1 | 8–12 | 5–17 | 7–15 | 8–14 | 4–18 |
| Cleveland | 18–4 | 14–7–1 | — | 11–10 | 7–15 | 10–12 | 16–6 | 11–11 |
| Detroit | 16–6 | 12–8 | 10–11 | — | 5–17–2 | 7–15 | 15–7 | 11–11 |
| New York | 17–5 | 17–5 | 15–7 | 17–5–2 | — | 14–8 | 16–6 | 11–11 |
| Philadelphia | 18–4 | 15–7 | 12–10 | 15–7 | 8–14 | — | 16–6 | 10–12 |
| St. Louis | 15–7 | 14–8 | 6–16 | 7–15 | 6–16 | 6–16 | — | 9–13 |
| Washington | 17–5 | 18–4 | 11–11 | 11–11 | 11–11 | 12–10 | 13–9 | — |

=== Roster ===
1932 Detroit Tigers
Roster
| Pitchers: 16 Tommy Bridges; 21 Izzy Goldstein; 18 Art Herring; 17 Elon Hogsett; 29 Buck Marrow; 22 Rip Sewell; 11 Vic Sorrell; 14 George Uhle; 15 Earl Whitehill; 12 Whit Wyatt | Catchers: 25 Gene Desautels; 23 Ray Hayworth; 9 Muddy Ruel; 24 George Susce; Infielders: 4 Dale Alexander; 26 Harry Davis; 2 Charlie Gehringer; 5 Billy Rhiel; 8 Nolen Richardson; 6 Billy Rogell; 33 Heinie Schuble | Outfielders: -- Frank Doljack; 1 Roy Johnson; 7 Bill Lawrence; 3 John Stone; 27 Gee Walker; 4 Earl Webb; 28 Jo-Jo White | Manager: 32 Bucky Harris; Coaches: 24 Bob Coleman; 31 Jewel Ens |

== Player stats ==
=== Batting ===
==== Starters by position ====
Note: Pos = Position; G = Games played; AB = At bats; H = Hits; Avg. = Batting average; HR = Home runs; RBI = Runs batted in

| Pos | Player | G | AB | H | Avg. | HR | RBI |
|---|---|---|---|---|---|---|---|
| C | Ray Hayworth | 109 | 338 | 99 | .293 | 2 | 46 |
| 1B | Harry Davis | 141 | 590 | 159 | .269 | 4 | 74 |
| 2B | Charlie Gehringer | 152 | 618 | 184 | .298 | 19 | 104 |
| SS | Billy Rogell | 144 | 554 | 150 | .271 | 9 | 60 |
| 3B | Heinie Schuble | 102 | 340 | 92 | .271 | 5 | 51 |
| OF | Gee Walker | 127 | 480 | 155 | .323 | 8 | 76 |
| OF | John Stone | 145 | 582 | 173 | .297 | 17 | 109 |
| OF | Earl Webb | 88 | 338 | 97 | .287 | 3 | 51 |

==== Other batters ====
Note: G = Games played; AB = At bats; H = Hits; Avg. = Batting average; HR = Home runs; RBI = Runs batted in

| Player | G | AB | H | Avg. | HR | RBI |
|---|---|---|---|---|---|---|
| Billy Rhiel | 85 | 250 | 70 | .280 | 3 | 38 |
| Jo-Jo White | 80 | 208 | 54 | .260 | 2 | 23 |
| Roy Johnson | 49 | 195 | 49 | .251 | 3 | 22 |
| Nolen Richardson | 69 | 155 | 34 | .219 | 0 | 12 |
| Muddy Ruel | 51 | 136 | 32 | .235 | 0 | 19 |
| Gene Desautels | 28 | 72 | 17 | .236 | 0 | 2 |
| Bill Lawrence | 25 | 46 | 10 | .217 | 0 | 3 |
| Frank Doljack | 8 | 26 | 10 | .385 | 1 | 7 |
| Dale Alexander | 23 | 16 | 4 | .250 | 0 | 4 |
| George Susce | 2 | 0 | 0 | ---- | 0 | 0 |

=== Pitching ===
==== Starting pitchers ====
Note: G = Games pitched; IP = Innings pitched; W = Wins; L = Losses; ERA = Earned run average; SO = Strikeouts

| Player | G | IP | W | L | ERA | SO |
|---|---|---|---|---|---|---|
| Earl Whitehill | 33 | 244.0 | 16 | 12 | 4.54 | 81 |
| Vic Sorrell | 32 | 234.1 | 14 | 14 | 4.03 | 84 |
| Tommy Bridges | 34 | 201.0 | 14 | 12 | 3.36 | 108 |

==== Other pitchers ====
Note: G = Games pitched; IP = Innings pitched; W = Wins; L = Losses; ERA = Earned run average; SO = Strikeouts

| Player | G | IP | W | L | ERA | SO |
|---|---|---|---|---|---|---|
| Whit Wyatt | 43 | 205.2 | 9 | 13 | 5.03 | 82 |
| Elon Hogsett | 47 | 178.0 | 11 | 9 | 3.54 | 56 |
| George Uhle | 33 | 146.2 | 6 | 6 | 4.48 | 51 |
| Buck Marrow | 18 | 63.2 | 2 | 5 | 4.81 | 31 |
| Izzy Goldstein | 16 | 56.1 | 3 | 2 | 4.47 | 14 |

==== Relief pitchers ====
Note: G = Games pitched; W = Wins; L = Losses; SV = Saves; ERA = Earned run average; SO = Strikeouts

| Player | G | W | L | SV | ERA | SO |
|---|---|---|---|---|---|---|
| Art Herring | 12 | 1 | 2 | 2 | 5.24 | 12 |
| Rip Sewell | 5 | 0 | 0 | 0 | 12.66 | 2 |

== Farm system ==
| Level | Team | League | Manager |
|---|---|---|---|
| AA | Toronto Maple Leafs | International League | Tom Daly and Lena Blackburne |
| A | Beaumont Exporters | Texas League | Del Baker |
| B | Decatur Commodores | Illinois–Indiana–Iowa League | Bob Coleman |
| C | Huntington Red Birds | Middle Atlantic League | Johnny Stuart |
| D | Moline Plowboys | Mississippi Valley League | Dutch Lorbeer |

LEAGUE CHAMPIONS: Beaumont

Decatur club folded, July 12, 1932

== Notable events ==
- On August 5 against the Washington Senators, pitcher Tommy Bridges came within one out of a perfect game, retiring the first 26 batters before the Senators' Dave Harris hit a pinch-hit single. Bridges retired the 28th batter, Sam Rice and the Tigers won 13–0. No MLB pitcher was subsequently to come so close to a perfect game until Don Larsen achieved the feat in the 1956 World Series.
