= 1932 Cleveland Indians season =

1932 Cleveland Indians
- League: American League
- Ballpark: League Park; Cleveland Municipal Stadium
- City: Cleveland, Ohio
- Owners: Alva Bradley
- General managers: Billy Evans
- Managers: Roger Peckinpaugh
- Radio: WHK (Jack Graney)

The 1932 Cleveland Indians season was a season in American baseball. The team finished fourth in the American League with a record of 87–65, 19 games behind the New York Yankees.

== Regular season ==
=== Season standings ===
American League
Team	W	L	Pct.	GB	Home	Road
New York Yankees	107	47	.695	—	62‍–‍15	45‍–‍32
Philadelphia Athletics	94	60	.610	13	51‍–‍26	43‍–‍34
Washington Senators	93	61	.604	14	51‍–‍26	42‍–‍35
Cleveland Indians	87	65	.572	19	43‍–‍33	44‍–‍32
Detroit Tigers	76	75	.503	29½	42‍–‍34	34‍–‍41
St. Louis Browns	63	91	.409	44	33‍–‍42	30‍–‍49
Chicago White Sox	49	102	.325	56½	28‍–‍49	21‍–‍53
Boston Red Sox	43	111	.279	64	27‍–‍50	16‍–‍61

=== Record vs. opponents ===
1932 American League record Sources:
Team	BOS	CWS	CLE	DET	NYY	PHA	SLB	WSH
Boston	—	12–10	4–18	6–16	5–17	4–18	7–15	5–17
Chicago	10–12	—	7–14–1	8–12	5–17	7–15	8–14	4–18
Cleveland	18–4	14–7–1	—	11–10	7–15	10–12	16–6	11–11
Detroit	16–6	12–8	10–11	—	5–17–2	7–15	15–7	11–11
New York	17–5	17–5	15–7	17–5–2	—	14–8	16–6	11–11
Philadelphia	18–4	15–7	12–10	15–7	8–14	—	16–6	10–12
St. Louis	15–7	14–8	6–16	7–15	6–16	6–16	—	9–13
Washington	17–5	18–4	11–11	11–11	11–11	12–10	13–9	—

=== Roster ===
1932 Cleveland Indians
Roster
Pitchers: 17 Pete Appleton; 16 Clint Brown; 15 Sarge Connally; 14 Wes Ferrell; 18 Mel Harder; 19 Oral Hildebrand; 12 Willis Hudlin; 24,21 Leo Moon; 24 Monte Pearson; 17 Jack Russell; 21 Ralph Winegarner	Catchers: 9 Glenn Myatt; 11 Frankie Pytlak; 8 Luke Sewell; Infielders: 22 Boze Berger; 22 Joe Boley; 1 Johnny Burnett; 4 Bill Cissell; 37 Bruce Connatser; 4 Johnny Hodapp; 5 Willie Kamm; 7 Ed Montague; 33 Ed Morgan	Outfielders: 3 Earl Averill; 28 Charlie Jamieson; 2 Dick Porter; 31 Mike Powers; 31 Bob Seeds; 6 Joe Vosmik	Manager: 10 Roger Peckinpaugh; Coaches: 20 Howie Shanks; 30 Earl Wolgamot

== Player stats ==
=== Batting ===
==== Starters by position ====
Note: Pos = Position; G = Games played; AB = At bats; H = Hits; Avg. = Batting average; HR = Home runs; RBI = Runs batted in

Pos	Player	G	AB	H	Avg.	HR	RBI
C	Luke Sewell	87	300	76	.253	2	52
1B	Ed Morgan	144	532	156	.293	4	68
2B	Bill Cissell	131	541	173	.320	6	93
SS	Johnny Burnett	129	512	152	.297	4	53
3B	Willie Kamm	148	524	150	.286	3	83
OF	Joe Vosmik	153	621	194	.312	10	97
OF	Earl Averill	153	631	198	.314	32	124
OF	Dick Porter	146	621	191	.308	4	60

==== Other batters ====
Note: G = Games played; AB = At bats; H = Hits; Avg. = Batting average; HR = Home runs; RBI = Runs batted in

Player	G	AB	H	Avg.	HR	RBI
Glenn Myatt	85	252	62	.246	8	46
Ed Montague	68	192	47	.245	0	24
Bruce Connatser	64	60	14	.233	0	4
Mike Powers	14	33	6	.182	0	5
Frankie Pytlak	33	29	7	.241	0	4
Charlie Jamieson	16	16	1	.063	0	0
Johnny Hodapp	7	16	2	.125	0	0
Bob Seeds	2	4	0	.000	0	0
Joe Boley	1	4	1	.250	0	0
Boze Berger	1	1	0	.000	0	0

=== Pitching ===
==== Starting pitchers ====
Note: G = Games pitched; IP = Innings pitched; W = Wins; L = Losses; ERA = Earned run average; SO = Strikeouts

Player	G	IP	W	L	ERA	SO
Wes Ferrell	38	287.2	23	13	3.66	105
Clint Brown	37	262.2	15	12	4.08	59
Mel Harder	39	254.2	15	13	3.75	90
Willis Hudlin	33	181.2	12	8	4.71	65
Oral Hildebrand	27	129.1	8	6	3.69	49
Jack Russell	18	113.0	5	7	4.70	27

==== Other pitchers ====
Note: G = Games pitched; IP = Innings pitched; W = Wins; L = Losses; ERA = Earned run average; SO = Strikeouts

Player	G	IP	W	L	ERA	SO
Ralph Winegarner	5	17.1	1	0	1.04	5
Leo Moon	1	5.2	0	0	11.12	1
Pete Appleton	4	5.0	0	0	16.20	1

==== Relief pitchers ====
Note: G = Games pitched; W = Wins; L = Losses; SV = Saves; ERA = Earned run average; SO = Strikeouts

Player	G	W	L	SV	ERA	SO
Sarge Connally	35	8	6	3	4.33	32
Monte Pearson	23	0	0	0	10.13	5

== Farm system ==
Level	Team	League	Manager
AA	Toledo Mud Hens	American Association	Bibb Falk
B	Fort Wayne Chiefs	Central League	Bill Wambsganss
B	Quincy Indians	Illinois–Indiana–Iowa League	Sylvester Simon
B	Williamsport Grays	New York–Pennsylvania League	Herbie Moran, Harry Hinchman and Glenn Killinger
D	Burlington Bees	Mississippi Valley League	Art Mueller and Jack Tesar

Illinois–Indiana–Iowa League folded July 15, 1932

== See also ==
- Philadelphia Athletics 18, Cleveland Indians 17 (1932) Record-setting game from this season
