= Emil Roy =

American baseball player (1907-1997)

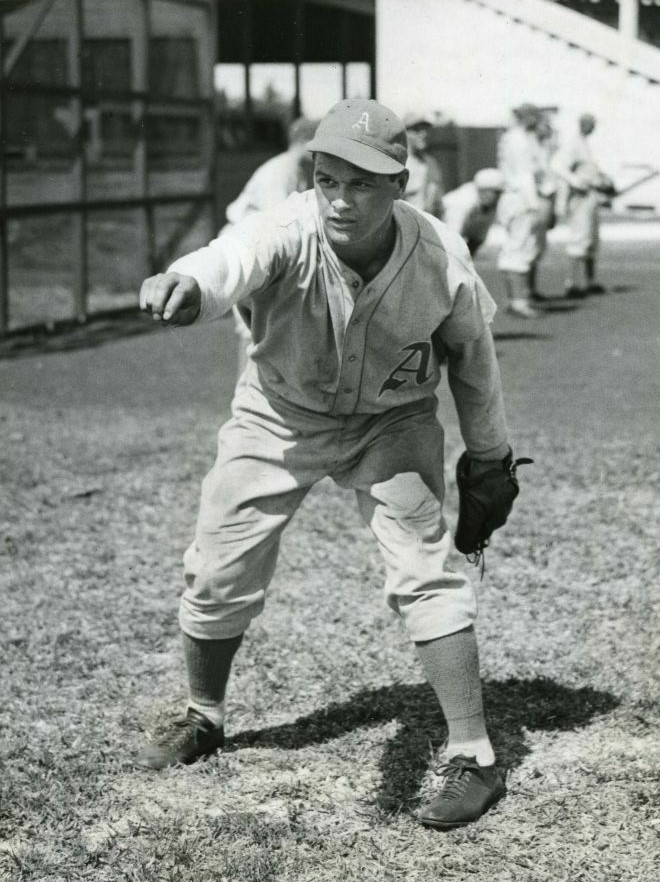
- Pitcher
- Born: May 26, 1907; Brighton, Massachusetts, U.S.
- Died: January 5, 1997 (aged 89); Crystal River, Florida, U.S.
- Batted: Right Threw: Right

MLB debut
- September 30, 1933, for the Philadelphia Athletics

Last MLB appearance
- September 30, 1933, for the Philadelphia Athletics

MLB statistics
- Win–loss record: 0-1
- Earned run average: 27.00
- Strikeouts: 3
- Stats at Baseball Reference

Teams
- Philadelphia Athletics (1933)

Emil Arthur "Bud" Roy (May 26, 1907 – January 5, 1997) was an American professional baseball pitcher. He played one game in Major League Baseball in 1933 with the Philadelphia Athletics. He batted and threw right-handed.

== Biography ==
A native of Brighton, Massachusetts, Roy played college baseball for Boston College, hurling a 15-strikeout game against Mount St. Mary's University in 1932. While at Boston College, he played summer baseball in the Cape Cod Baseball League, twirling for the league's Wareham team in 1932, and for the Barnstable and Falmouth teams in 1933.

In September 1933, Roy was signed by Connie Mack's Philadelphia Athletics. Roy appeared in a single game for the Athletics that season, taking the mound to start the second game of a doubleheader on September 30 at Shibe Park against the Boston Red Sox. The Athletics' defense behind Roy boasted Baseball Hall of Fame first baseman Jimmie Foxx. Roy lasted two and a third innings, striking out three and yielding seven earned runs on four hits and four walks, including a hit and a walk to Hall of Fame catcher Rick Ferrell. Roy was relieved by Hank Winston, who went the rest of the way for Philadelphia in a 12-1 loss.

Roy died in Crystal River, Florida in 1997 at the age of 89.
