= Wally Roettger =

American baseball player (1902–1951)

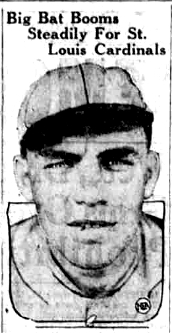
- Outfielder
- Born: August 28, 1902; St. Louis, Missouri, U.S.
- Died: September 14, 1951 (aged 49); Champaign, Illinois, U.S.
- Batted: Right Threw: Right

MLB debut
- May 1, 1927, for the St. Louis Cardinals

Last MLB appearance
- September 30, 1934, for the Pittsburgh Pirates

MLB statistics
- Batting average: .285
- Home runs: 19
- Runs batted in: 245
- Stats at Baseball Reference

Teams
- St. Louis Cardinals (1927–1929); New York Giants (1930); Cincinnati Reds (1931); St. Louis Cardinals (1931); Cincinnati Reds (1932–1934); Pittsburgh Pirates (1934)

Career highlights and awards
- World Series champion (1931)

Walter Henry Roettger (August 28, 1902 – September 14, 1951) was an American professional baseball player who was an outfielder in the major leagues from 1927 to 1935. He played for the St. Louis Cardinals, Cincinnati Reds, New York Giants and Pittsburgh Pirates, and was a member of the 1931 World Series champion Cardinals.

In 599 games played, Roettger batted .285 (556–1,949) with 192 runs scored, 19 home runs and 245 RBI in eight MLB seasons. In the 1931 World Series, he hit .286 (4–14). His career fielding percentage was .986 at all three outfield positions.

== Biography ==
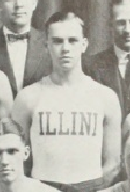
Roettger as a basketball player at Illinois.

Roettger attended the University of Illinois, graduating in 1924. While at Illinois, he played basketball and baseball. In 1931 while playing for the Cardinals, he got the first hit (off Lefty Grove) and scored the first run in the 1931 World Series.

He became the head coach for baseball at the University of Illinois from 1935 to 1951 and an assistant coach for basketball from 1936 to 1949.

Roettger died by suicide in Champaign, Illinois, at the age of 49.

Roettger had two brothers who were involved in Major League Baseball. Hal Roettger served as an assistant to baseball executive Branch Rickey for nearly 20 years until he died unexpectedly in the swimming pool of a Florida motel in 1955. Oscar Roettger was a major league pitcher and first baseman who later coached minor league baseball.
