= Joe Zapustas =

American baseball player (1907–2001)

- Outfielder
- Born: July 25, 1907; Liepāja, Russian Empire
- Died: January 14, 2001 (aged 93); Brockton, Massachusetts, U.S.
- Batted: Right Threw: Right

MLB debut
- September 28, 1933, for the Philadelphia Athletics

Last MLB appearance
- September 30, 1933, for the Philadelphia Athletics

MLB statistics
- Batting average: .200
- Home runs: 0
- RBI: 0
- Stats at Baseball Reference

Teams
- Philadelphia Athletics (1933)

Joseph John Zapustas (July 25, 1907 – January 14, 2001) was an American professional baseball player. He appeared in two games in Major League Baseball as an outfielder for the Philadelphia Athletics during the 1933 Philadelphia Athletics season. He had one hit in five at bats. He also played for the New York Giants of the NFL in 1933. He is the first, and as of 2025, only Major League Baseball player to be born in Latvia.

After retiring from football and baseball in 1939, Zapustas taught science and mathematics at high school, along with coaching the Quincy Manets semi-professional football team. Zapustas also became a boxing referee, officiating in bouts featuring Rocky Marciano, Joe Louis and Sugar Ray Robinson. Zapustas was the Director of Recreation for Randolph, Massachusetts between 1951 and 1991, and was honoured in 1998 by the local ice hockey rink being renamed the Joseph J. Zapustas Arena.
