= Bill Chamberlain (baseball) =

American baseball player (1909–1994)

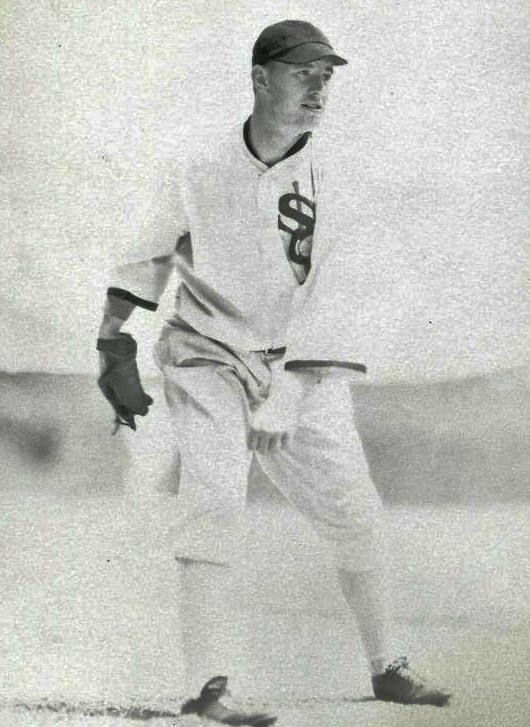
- Pitcher
- Born: April 21, 1909; Stoughton, Massachusetts, U.S.
- Died: February 6, 1994 (aged 84); Brockton, Massachusetts, U.S.
- Batted: Right Threw: Left

MLB debut
- August 2, 1932, for the Chicago White Sox

Last MLB appearance
- September 23, 1932, for the Chicago White Sox

MLB statistics
- Win–loss record: 0–5
- Earned run average: 4.57
- Strikeouts: 11
- Stats at Baseball Reference

Teams
- Chicago White Sox (1932)

William Vincent Chamberlain (April 21, 1909 – February 6, 1994) was an American professional baseball pitcher who played for the Chicago White Sox of Major League Baseball in 1932.

== Biography ==
Chamberlain grew up in Milton, Massachusetts, and played college baseball at Saint Anselm College. Chamberlain was pitching for Harwich in the Cape Cod Baseball League (CCBL) in the summer of 1932 when he was noticed by a White Sox scout. He was playing in Chicago by the end of the season.

In his only major league campaign, Chamberlain appeared in 12 games for the 1932 White Sox, posting a 4.57 ERA in 41.1 innings. He gave up three big league home runs, two to Baseball Hall of Famer Mickey Cochrane, and one that was the 200th home run of Hall of Famer Al Simmons' illustrious career. Perhaps Chamberlain's most memorable outing came on August 29 in the second game of a doubleheader against the New York Yankees at Yankee Stadium. In a 4-3 White Sox loss, Chamberlain held Babe Ruth and Lou Gehrig hitless over five innings, and helped his own cause with a single off Hall of Fame hurler Red Ruffing.

Chamberlain continued to play professionally in the minor leagues through 1938. While serving a one-month suspension from the New York–Pennsylvania League in 1937, he returned to play again for the CCBL's Harwich club. After his baseball career had ended, Chamberlain spent 30 years with the Boston Police Department, retiring in 1970.
