= Joel McKeithan =

American baseball coach (born 1991)

St. Louis Cardinals
- Coach
- Born: August 15, 1991 (age 35); Arden, North Carolina, U.S.
- Bats: Switch Throws: Right

Teams
- Cincinnati Reds (2022–2024); Chicago White Sox (2025–2026); St. Louis Cardinals (2027–present)

Joel Michael McKeithan (born August 15, 1991) is an American professional baseball coach who is the hitting coach for the St. Louis Cardinals of Major League Baseball (MLB). He has previously coached in MLB for the Cincinnati Reds and Chicago White Sox.

== Career ==
McKeithan graduated from T. C. Roberson High School in Asheville, North Carolina. He enrolled at Vanderbilt University and played college baseball for the Vanderbilt Commodores. In the summer of 2013, he played for the Newport Gulls in the New England Collegiate Baseball League and was named an all-star. He transferred to North Carolina State University and finished his college baseball career with the NC State Wolfpack.

In 2019, McKeithan served as a minor league hitting coach for the Williamsport Crosscutters, a farm team in the Philadelphia Phillies organization. He was the minor league hitting coordinator for the Detroit Tigers for the 2021 season.

After the 2021 season, the Cincinnati Reds hired McKeithan to their major league coaching staff as their assistant hitting coach. On November 29, 2022, the Reds promoted McKeithan to be their primary hitting coach for the 2023 season.

Following the 2024 season, McKeithan was hired to be an assistant hitting coach for the Chicago White Sox.

On November 4, 2026, McKeithan was hired to be the hitting coach for the St. Louis Cardinals.

== Personal life ==
His great-uncle, Tim McKeithan, pitched in MLB. His grandfather, Jerry Sr., played in the minor leagues, while his father played college baseball for NC State and UNC Charlotte. His brother, also named Tim, is a coach for the Pittsburgh Pirates organization, and his other brother, Aaron, plays in the minor leagues for the Cardinals organization.
