= Izzy Goldstein =

American baseball player (1908–1993)

- Pitcher
- Born: June 6, 1908; Odessa, Russian Empire
- Died: September 24, 1993 (aged 85); Delray Beach, Florida, U.S.
- Batted: Switch Threw: Right

MLB debut
- April 24, 1932, for the Detroit Tigers

Last MLB appearance
- July 27, 1932, for the Detroit Tigers

MLB statistics
- Win–loss record: 3–2
- Earned run average: 4.47
- Strikeouts: 14
- Stats at Baseball Reference

Teams
- Detroit Tigers (1932)

Isidore Goldstein (June 6, 1908 – September 24, 1993) was an American professional baseball player. A native of Odessa who grew up in The Bronx, he was a right-handed pitcher who played seven years in professional baseball from 1928 to 1934, including 16 games in Major League Baseball with the 1932 Detroit Tigers. He compiled a 3–2 record and 4.47 in his 16 major league games.

== Early years ==
Goldstein, who was born in 1908 in Odessa, Russian Empire (now part of Ukraine), was Jewish, and moved with his family to the Bronx in New York City as a boy. He dropped out of high school to join a local semi-pro baseball team. When his semi-pro baseball career did not work out, Goldstein re-enrolled in high school, at James Monroe High School in The Bronx. He was teammates with future Baseball Hall of Fame slugger Hank Greenberg on the James Monroe baseball team. The team lost 4–1 at the Polo Grounds in the city championship game.

Goldstein again returned to semi-pro baseball, this time with a team from Long Island, as a right-handed, 6 feet (1.8 m), 160 pounds (73 kg) pitcher.

== Professional career ==
=== Minors ===
The Tigers signed Goldstein and assigned him to the Wheeling Stogies of the Mid-Atlantic League where he compiled a 12–9 record and a 3.61 ERA in 1928. In 1929, Goldstein played for the Evansville Hubs of the Three I League, compiling a 12–8 record with a 2.74 ERA. Goldstein remained in Evansville in 1930, compiling a 14–11 record and a 3.52 ERA.

Goldstein spent most of the 1931 season with the Beaumont Exporters of the Texas League. In Beaumont, Goldstein was reunited with his high school teammate Hank Greenberg. Goldstein compiled a 16–11 record and 3.58 ERA at Beaumont in 1931.

=== Detroit Tigers ===
In 1932, the Tigers invited Goldstein to spring training but sent him back to Beaumont to start the season. Goldstein compiled a 6–1 record and 1.58 ERA at the start of the 1932 season with Beaumont. He was promoted to the Tigers and made his major league debut at Navin Field on April 24, 1932. In May 1932, Goldstein got his first major league win. On June 27, 1932, Goldstein pitched a complete game and allowed five hits, defeating the White Sox 9 to 3, though he also walked five batters and hit two batters. The victory over the White Sox was Goldstein's last game in the majors. In 16 games, including six starts, Goldstein compiled a 3–2 record with a 4.47 ERA and a 1.846 WHIP rating. He also compiled a .294 batting average (5 for 17) showed considerable talent, Izzy's skills were not fully harnessed during his short stay in the majors.

=== Return to minors ===
Goldstein finished the 1932 season with the Class AA Toronto Maple Leafs of the International League. He sustained a major arm injury late in the 1932 season. He returned from the injury in 1933 and compiled a 9–7 record with a 4.17 ERA in 1933.

== Personal life ==
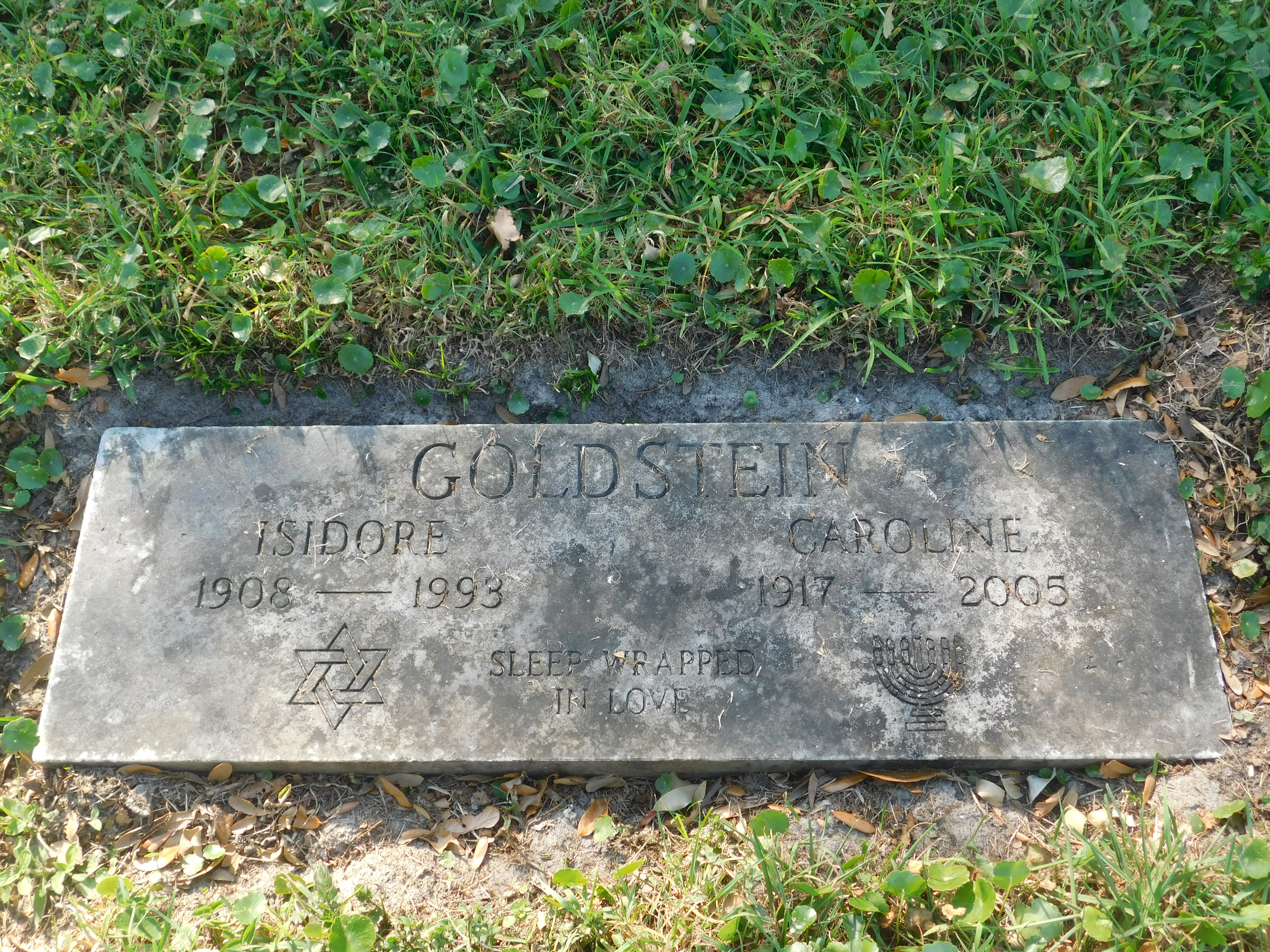
Goldstein's grave at Eternal Light Memorial Gardens with his wife Caroline

Goldstein retired from baseball after the 1938 season and began selling men's clothing in New York City. In 1943, Goldstein was drafted and served in the South Pacific theater from 1943 to 1945. After the war, Goldstein returned to his career selling men's clothing until 1975, when he moved to Florida. He died in 1993 at Delray Beach, Florida, at the age of 85. He was buried at the Jewish Eternal Light Memorial Gardens in Boynton Beach, Florida.
