= Leo Moon =

American baseball player (1899–1970)

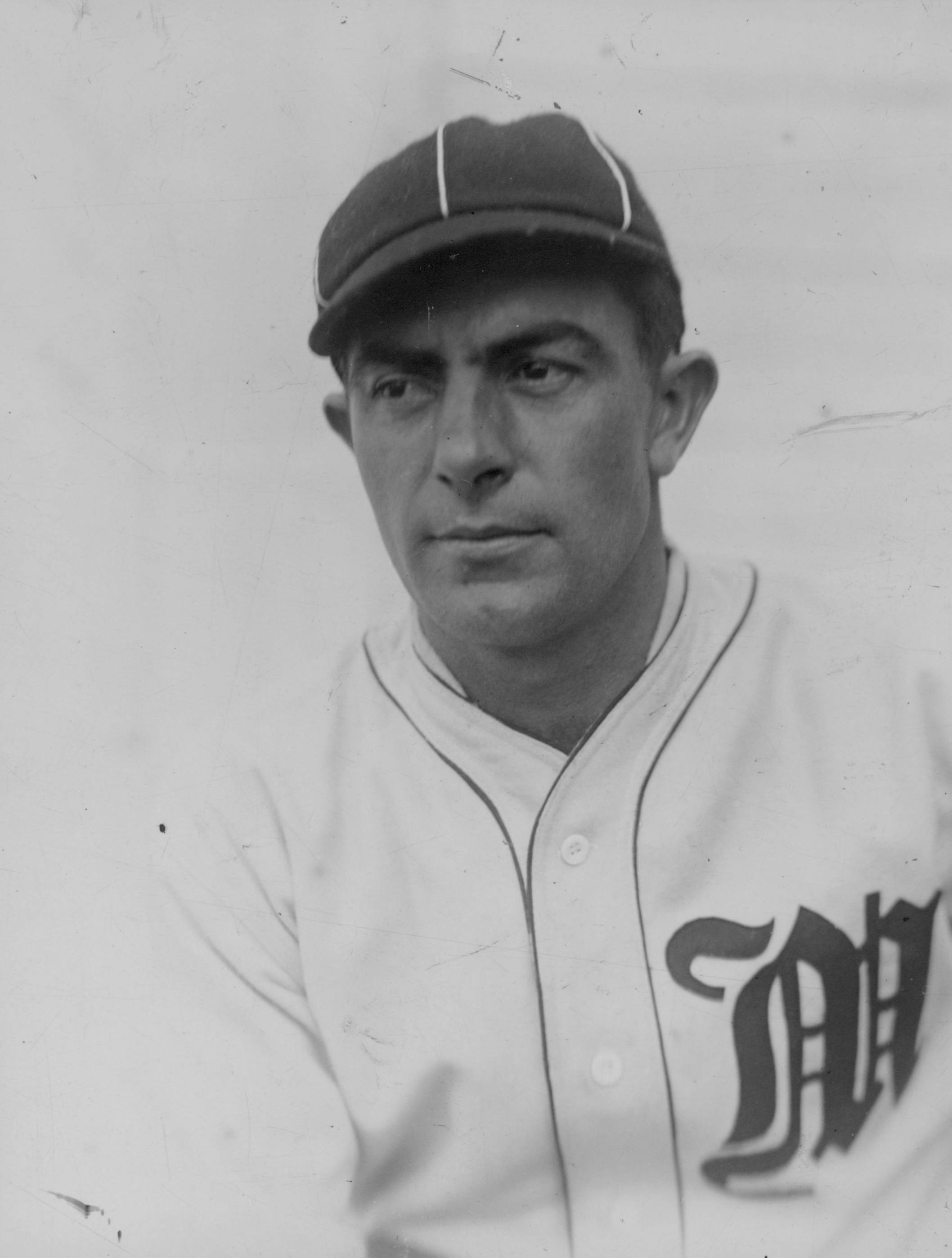
- Pitcher
- Born: June 22, 1899; Bellemont, North Carolina, U.S.
- Died: August 25, 1970 (aged 71); New Orleans, Louisiana, U.S.
- Batted: Right Threw: Left

MLB debut
- July 9, 1932, for the Cleveland Indians

Last MLB appearance
- July 9, 1932, for the Cleveland Indians

MLB statistics
- Earned run average: 11.12
- Innings pitched: 5.2
- Stats at Baseball Reference

Teams
- Cleveland Indians (1932)

Leo Moon (June 22, 1899 – August 25, 1970) was an American Major League Baseball (MLB) pitcher for one season. He pitched 5 2/3 innings in one game for the Cleveland Indians during the 1932 Cleveland Indians season and had a 17-year career in the minor leagues. He was originally born with two fingers on his left hand fused together. While actively pitching in baseball, he had surgery to split the two in 1927.

Moon began his professional career in 1924 with in the Texas League. He then spent 1925 and 1926 with the Des Moines Demons, finishing the second season with 24 wins and eight losses. He spent 1926 to 1928 with the Minneapolis Millers, and followed that up with three seasons with the Little Rock Travelers. His best season there was 1930, when he had a win-loss record of 18-9 and a 2.98 earned run average (ERA) in 41 games and 248 innings pitched.

Moon split the 1932 season with the Toledo Mud Hens and New Orleans Pelicans. While with Toledo, the Cleveland Indians signed him to a contract to give themselves a left-handed pitcher on the roster. Moon made his debut on July 9 in the second game of a doubleheader against the Washington Senators, allowing seven runs and seven bases on balls in 5.2 innings pitched in a 14-4 loss.

He returned to the minor leagues shortly after that appearance, and spent 1933 with New Orleans. Moon spend the next five seasons with the Knoxville Smokies and Atlanta Crackers in the Southern Association, finishing with a 17-9 record in two of those seasons. He spent 1939 with the Fort Worth Cats and Oklahoma City Indians, then wrapped up his career in 1940, finishing his professional career with over 200 wins.
