= Oscar Roettger =

American baseball player (1900-1986)

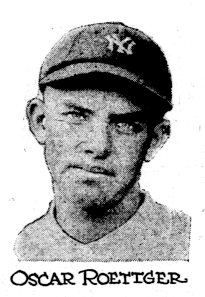
- First baseman/Pitcher
- Born: February 19, 1900; St. Louis, Missouri, U.S.
- Died: July 4, 1986 (aged 86); St. Louis, Missouri, U.S.
- Batted: Right Threw: Right

MLB debut
- July 7, 1923, for the New York Yankees

Last MLB appearance
- June 27, 1932, for the Philadelphia Athletics

MLB statistics
- Batting average: .212
- Runs batted in: 6
- Earned run average: 8.49
- Stats at Baseball Reference

Teams
- New York Yankees (1923–1924); Brooklyn Robins (1927); Philadelphia Athletics (1932)

Oscar Frederick Louis Roettger (February 19, 1900 – July 4, 1986) was an American baseball player whose 19-year active career was augmented by brief service as a minor-league manager and over 35 years as the liaison between the Rawlings Sporting Goods Company and professional baseball. In his abbreviated Major League career, he appeared in 37 total games as a pitcher and first baseman for the New York Yankees (1923–1924), Brooklyn Robins (1927) and Philadelphia Athletics (1932). He threw and batted right-handed, stood 6 feet (1.8 m) tall and weighed 170 pounds (77 kg).

The native of St. Louis, Missouri, was the eldest of three brothers who made baseball their profession; the others were Wally Roettger, an outfielder who played in 599 games over eight seasons (1927–1934) with four National League teams, and, later, a college baseball head coach; and Harold, a front-office executive who worked for Branch Rickey with both the Brooklyn Dodgers and Pittsburgh Pirates.

Oscar's playing career lasted from 1921–1939. He broke into the Majors with the Yankees of Babe Ruth as a pitcher, but he struggled on the mound in a six-game trial spread out over two seasons. Sent back to the minors, he returned to the big leagues with Brooklyn as a position player in 1927, starting one game as a right fielder and making four appearances as a pinch hitter. Then, five years later, he got into 26 games for the 1932 Athletics, starting 13 games at first base in April and May when Philadelphia's regular at the position, Baseball Hall of Fame slugger Jimmie Foxx, temporarily moved to third base. Roettger collected 14 hits, only one—a double—for extra bases, and batted a meek .233. They were the only hits of his MLB tenure; he batted .212 overall in 66 at bats and 74 plate appearances, with six runs batted in. As a pitcher, he had no decisions in six games, although he is credited with one save, which was not an official statistic at the time. He allowed 17 hits, 14 bases on balls, and 11 earned runs in only 112/3 innings, with seven strikeouts. However, Roettger would enjoy extended success in the minors as a hard-hitting first baseman and fixture for the St. Paul Saints and Montreal Royals of the 1920s and 1930s.

After the 1941 baseball season, Roettger—then in his early forties—enlisted in the United States Army for World War II military service. When the war ended, he joined Rawlings full-time, working into the 1980s as the company's chief sales executive for Major and minor league teams. In 1983, in Nashville, Tennessee, he was presented with the King of Baseball Award given by Minor League Baseball at the annual winter meetings.

He died at age 86 in St. Louis.
