= Joe Boley =

American baseball player (1896–1962)

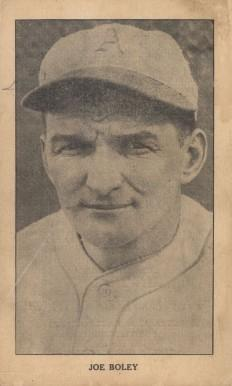
- Shortstop
- Born: July 19, 1896; Mahanoy City, Pennsylvania, U.S.
- Died: December 30, 1962 (aged 66); Mahanoy City, Pennsylvania, U.S.
- Batted: Right Threw: Right

MLB debut
- April 12, 1927, for the Philadelphia Athletics

Last MLB appearance
- June 29, 1932, for the Cleveland Indians

MLB statistics
- Batting average: .269
- Home runs: 7
- Runs batted in: 227
- Stats at Baseball Reference

Teams
- Philadelphia Athletics (1927–1932); Cleveland Indians (1932)

John Peter "Joe" Boley (July 19, 1896 – December 30, 1962) was an American professional baseball player. He played as a shortstop in Major League Baseball (MLB) from 1927 to 1932, most notably as a member of the Philadelphia Athletics dynasty that won three consecutive American League pennants from 1929 to 1931 and, won the World Series in 1929 and 1930. He also played for the Cleveland Indians.

Boley started his professional career with the Baltimore Orioles where he played on seven championship teams. Boley, along with teammates Lefty Grove and Jack Ogden were held back by manager Jack Dunn for financial and performance reasons, which held back his Major League career. He was signed by Connie Mack for an estimated $60,000 in 1927, but his career was on the decline. Despite his short MLB career, Boley was considered to be one of the top shortstops in baseball.

== Early life ==
Born John Peter Bolinsky to Polish immigrants, Bolinsky started working in the coal fields surrounding Mahanoy City, Pennsylvania at age 10. He legally changed his last name to Boley in the late 1910s, either because of his professional career, or because he wanted an "Americanized" name. He began his professional baseball career at the age of 19 with the Chambersburg Maroons of the class D Blue Ridge League in 1916. He moved up to the class B Harrisburg Islanders of the New York State League in 1917.

== Baltimore Orioles ==
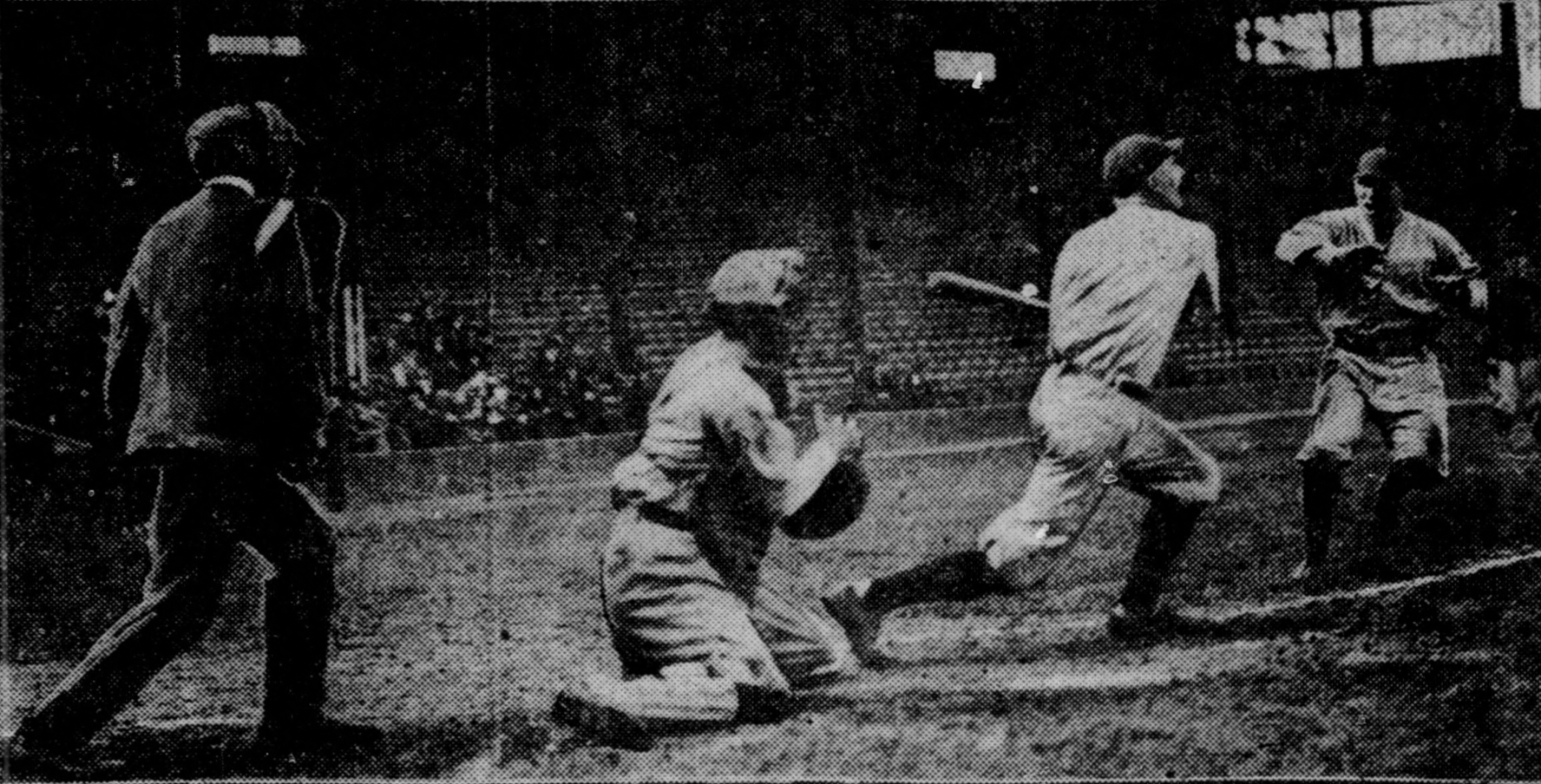
Joe Boley bats on April 7, 1919, at Shibe Park

Boley was a good fielder, steady hitter, and member of the Baltimore Orioles team that won seven consecutive International League championships (1919–1925). In 1923, the New York Yankees took an interest in Boley to replace aging shortstop Everett Scott, but backed off as Boley's reputed $100,000 price tag kept the Yankees and major league bidders at bay for years. The Chicago White Sox also took an interest in Boley, but Dunn requested $100,000 and three players, which they declined. It made manager Jack Dunn give Boley a high salary, similar to the average pay from Major League Baseball. After the Toronto Maple Leafs won the pennant in 1926, Dunn redundantly parted ways with Boley. Athletics owner Connie Mack bought him for an estimated $60,000 to $100,000 in 1927, when the Orioles team was being disbanded. He was elected to the International League Hall of Fame in 1954.

== Major League career ==
During his first MLB season, the 28-year-old rookie batted .311 for the A's. Boley joined Jimmie Foxx, Max Bishop, and Jimmy Dykes in Mack's "Million Dollar Infield", which sparked the A's to three pennants and two world championships (1929–31). In 1930, Boley again led all American League shortstops with a .970 fielding percentage, while finishing fourth in assists and putouts. He had career highs in both home runs (4) and RBIs (55). Boley was injured for most of 1931, playing only in 67 games, and batting a career-low .228. Dib Williams took over at shortstop and played well, costing Boley his starting job once he recovered.

Before the start of the 1932 spring training, Mack sold Boley to the Cleveland Indians in a trial basis, with the proviso that the Indians would buy his full contract if satisfied, and return him to the Athletics if not. The Indians had tried three shortstops during its 1931 campaign, Ed Montague, Bill Hunnefield and Jonah Goldman, without much success. Cleveland manager Roger Peckinpaugh thought Boley's fielding skills would help them win, and Boley was considered a "considerable improvement" by local sportswriters. Commissioner of Baseball Kenesaw Mountain Landis vetoed the "try-him-and-buy-him" deal and ordered Boley to return to the Athletics. Mack commented of the veto "It seemed a shame for a player of Joe's years and ability... to sit on a bench when he might be playing regularly with some other club." He regained his starting job once Williams started struggling, but injured his shoulder a few weeks into the season and started playing poorly. He was released by the Athletics on May 9, which was likely linked to the injury and subsequent play. Between his two stints between teams, Boley helped save the lives of five occupants of a burning car near Philadelphia and drove the injured to the hospital. He signed a contract with the Indians on June 10, but only played one game with them. In a June 29 loss against the Detroit Tigers, Boley had a harmless single in four at-bats, while starting at shortstop. He was released a week later, ending his career.

In 540 games over six seasons, Boley posted a .269 batting average (478-for-1780) with 203 runs, 88 doubles, 22 triples, 7 home runs, 227 RBI and 130 bases on balls. Defensively, he recorded a .957 fielding percentage. In three World Series (1929–31) he batted .154 (6-for-39) with 2 runs and 2 RBI.

== Personal life ==
Nicknamed "Silent Joe" for his quiet personality, Boley was named "the second least talkative player in the big leagues" by legendary Washington Post reporter Shirley Povich. Boley was married to Ann Christoff and had three children. He worked in the mining fields before moving to the automotive business during the off-season. He died in Mahanoy City, after a six-week hospital stay in 1962.
