= 1932 New York Yankees season =

Season for the Major League Baseball team the New York Yankees

1932 New York Yankees
- World Series champions American League champions
- League: American League
- Ballpark: Yankee Stadium
- City: New York City, New York
- Record: 107–47 (.695)
- League place: 1st
- Owners: Jacob Ruppert
- General managers: Ed Barrow
- Managers: Joe McCarthy (second season)

The 1932 New York Yankees season was the team's 30th season. The team finished with a record of 107–47–2 (.695), winning their seventh pennant and finishing 13 games ahead of the Philadelphia Athletics. New York was managed and owned by future Hall of Famers Joe McCarthy and Jacob Ruppert, respectively, and the general manager was future Hall-of-Famer Ed Barrow.

For the third straight season, the Yankees fielded nine players who would eventually be enshrined in the Hall of Fame (Earle Combs, Bill Dickey, Lou Gehrig, Lefty Gomez, Tony Lazzeri, Herb Pennock, Red Ruffing, Babe Ruth, and Joe Sewell). This is the most all time, tied with the previous year's team as well as the 1930 and 1933 Yankees teams. The same nine Hall of Famers played for the 1931, 1932, and 1933 teams, with the 1930 team differing only by not having Joe Sewell and instead featuring Waite Hoyt.

The Yankees played their home games at Yankee Stadium. In the World Series, they swept the Chicago Cubs.

The 1932 Yankees became the first team in MLB history to go an entire season without being shut out. Only two teams since, the 2000 Cincinnati Reds and 2020 Los Angeles Dodgers (in a shortened 60-game season) have gone an entire season without being shut out.

== Regular season ==
- June 3, 1932: Lou Gehrig became the first player in the 20th century to hit four home runs in one game.
- June 3, 1932: Tony Lazzeri had a natural cycle (hit a single, double, triple and home run in that order) that was also completed with a grand slam. This event is often overlooked because it was the same game in which Lou Gehrig hit four home runs.

=== Miller Huggins ===
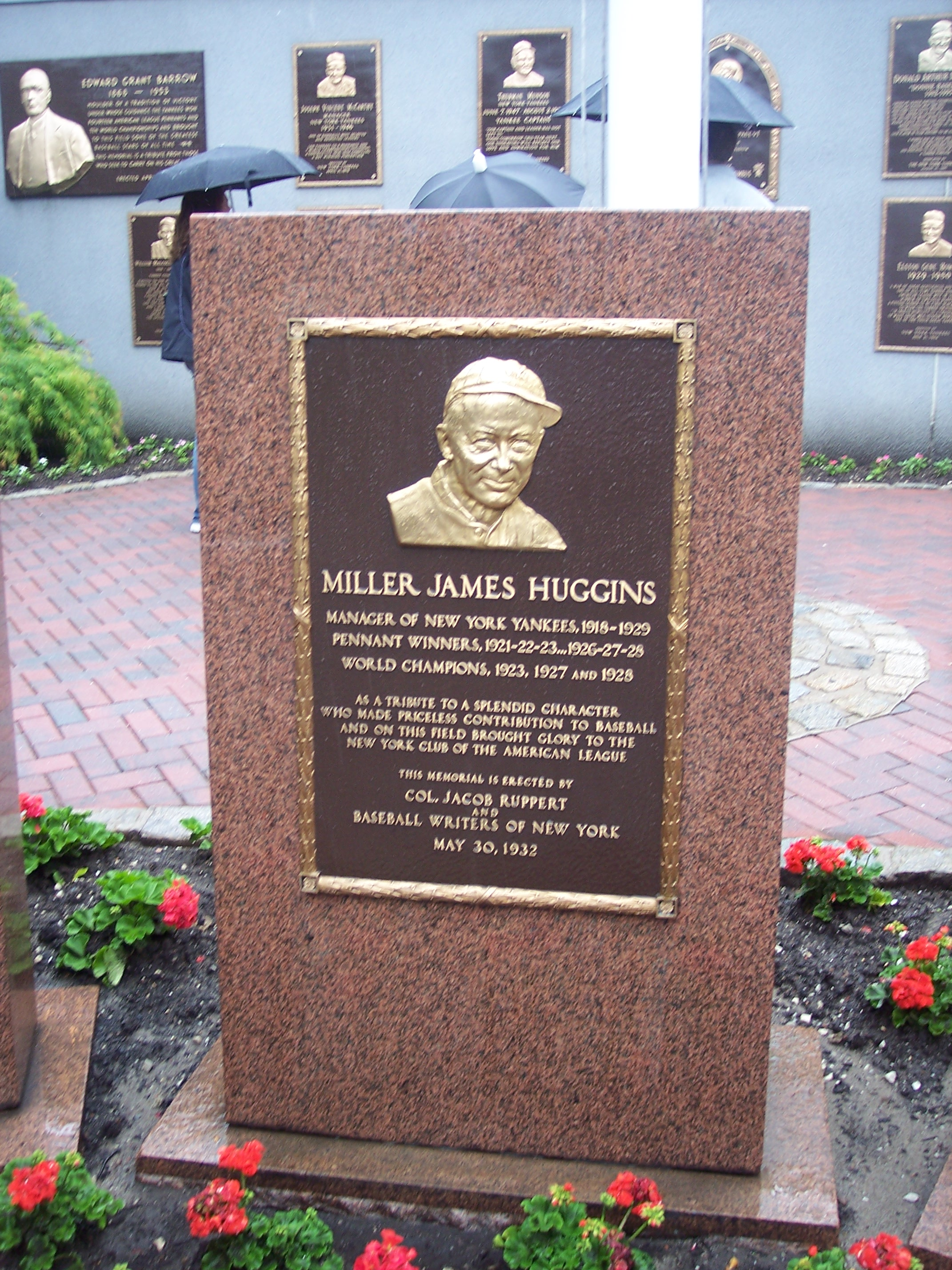
Huggins's monument at Monument Park.

On May 30, 1932, the Yankees dedicated a monument to their former manager, Miller Huggins. Huggins was the first of many Yankees personnel granted this honor. The monument was placed in front of the flagpole in center field at Yankee Stadium. an area which eventually became "Monument Park", dedicated in 1976. The monument calls Huggins "A splendid character who made priceless contributions to baseball."

=== Season standings ===
American League
| Team | W | L | Pct. | GB | Home | Road |
|---|---|---|---|---|---|---|
| New York Yankees | 107 | 47 | .695 | — | 62‍–‍15 | 45‍–‍32 |
| Philadelphia Athletics | 94 | 60 | .610 | 13 | 51‍–‍26 | 43‍–‍34 |
| Washington Senators | 93 | 61 | .604 | 14 | 51‍–‍26 | 42‍–‍35 |
| Cleveland Indians | 87 | 65 | .572 | 19 | 43‍–‍33 | 44‍–‍32 |
| Detroit Tigers | 76 | 75 | .503 | 29½ | 42‍–‍34 | 34‍–‍41 |
| St. Louis Browns | 63 | 91 | .409 | 44 | 33‍–‍42 | 30‍–‍49 |
| Chicago White Sox | 49 | 102 | .325 | 56½ | 28‍–‍49 | 21‍–‍53 |
| Boston Red Sox | 43 | 111 | .279 | 64 | 27‍–‍50 | 16‍–‍61 |

=== Record vs. opponents ===
1932 American League record Sources:
| Team | BOS | CWS | CLE | DET | NYY | PHA | SLB | WSH |
|---|---|---|---|---|---|---|---|---|
| Boston | — | 12–10 | 4–18 | 6–16 | 5–17 | 4–18 | 7–15 | 5–17 |
| Chicago | 10–12 | — | 7–14–1 | 8–12 | 5–17 | 7–15 | 8–14 | 4–18 |
| Cleveland | 18–4 | 14–7–1 | — | 11–10 | 7–15 | 10–12 | 16–6 | 11–11 |
| Detroit | 16–6 | 12–8 | 10–11 | — | 5–17–2 | 7–15 | 15–7 | 11–11 |
| New York | 17–5 | 17–5 | 15–7 | 17–5–2 | — | 14–8 | 16–6 | 11–11 |
| Philadelphia | 18–4 | 15–7 | 12–10 | 15–7 | 8–14 | — | 16–6 | 10–12 |
| St. Louis | 15–7 | 14–8 | 6–16 | 7–15 | 6–16 | 6–16 | — | 9–13 |
| Washington | 17–5 | 18–4 | 11–11 | 11–11 | 11–11 | 12–10 | 13–9 | — |

=== Roster ===
1932 New York Yankees
Roster
| Pitchers: 18 Johnny Allen; 28 Ivy Andrews; 19 Jumbo Brown; 20 Charlie Devens; 11 Lefty Gomez; 17 Hank Johnson; 17 Danny MacFayden; 16 Wilcy Moore; 20 Johnny Murphy; 12 Herb Pennock; 10 George Pipgras; 16 Gordon Rhodes; 15 Red Ruffing; 14 Ed Wells | Catchers: 8 Bill Dickey; 26 Joe Glenn; 9 Arndt Jorgens; 32 Eddie Phillips; Infielders: 5 Frankie Crosetti; 22 Doc Farrell; 4 Lou Gehrig; 2 Lyn Lary; 23 Tony Lazzeri; 7 Jack Saltzgaver; -- Roy Schalk; 21 Joe Sewell | Outfielders: 24 Sammy Byrd; 6 Ben Chapman; 1 Earle Combs; 27 Myril Hoag; 3 Babe Ruth; Other batters: 32 Dusty Cooke | Manager: -- Joe McCarthy; Coaches: 30 Jimmy Burke; 29 Art Fletcher; 31 Cy Perkins |

== Player stats ==
=== Batting ===
==== Starters by position ====
Note: Pos = Position; G = Games played; AB = At bats; H = Hits; Avg. = Batting average; HR = Home runs; RBI = Runs batted in

| Pos | Player | G | AB | H | Avg. | HR | RBI |
|---|---|---|---|---|---|---|---|
| C | Bill Dickey | 108 | 423 | 131 | .310 | 15 | 84 |
| 1B | Lou Gehrig | 156 | 596 | 208 | .349 | 34 | 151 |
| 2B | Tony Lazzeri | 142 | 510 | 153 | .300 | 15 | 113 |
| 3B | Joe Sewell | 125 | 503 | 137 | .272 | 11 | 68 |
| SS | Frankie Crosetti | 116 | 398 | 96 | .241 | 5 | 57 |
| OF | Ben Chapman | 151 | 581 | 174 | .299 | 10 | 107 |
| OF | Earle Combs | 144 | 591 | 190 | .321 | 9 | 65 |
| OF | Babe Ruth | 133 | 457 | 156 | .341 | 41 | 137 |

==== Other batters ====
Note: G = Games played; AB = At bats; H = Hits; Avg. = Batting average; HR = Home runs; RBI = Runs batted in

| Player | G | AB | H | Avg. | HR | RBI |
|---|---|---|---|---|---|---|
| Lyn Lary | 91 | 280 | 65 | .232 | 3 | 39 |
| Sammy Byrd | 105 | 209 | 62 | .297 | 8 | 30 |
| Arndt Jorgens | 56 | 151 | 33 | .219 | 2 | 19 |
| Doc Farrell | 26 | 63 | 11 | .175 | 0 | 4 |
| Myril Hoag | 46 | 54 | 20 | .370 | 1 | 7 |
| Jack Saltzgaver | 20 | 47 | 6 | .128 | 0 | 5 |
| Eddie Phillips | 9 | 31 | 9 | .290 | 2 | 4 |
| Joe Glenn | 6 | 16 | 2 | .125 | 0 | 0 |
| Roy Schalk | 3 | 12 | 3 | .250 | 0 | 0 |
| Dusty Cooke | 3 | 0 | 0 | ---- | 0 | 0 |

=== Pitching ===
==== Starting pitchers ====
Note: G = Games pitched; IP = Innings pitched; W = Wins; L = Losses; ERA = Earned run average; SO = Strikeouts

| Player | G | IP | W | L | ERA | SO |
|---|---|---|---|---|---|---|
| Lefty Gomez | 37 | 265.1 | 24 | 9 | 4.21 | 176 |
| Red Ruffing | 35 | 259.0 | 18 | 7 | 3.09 | 190 |
| George Pipgras | 32 | 219.0 | 16 | 9 | 4.19 | 111 |
| Herb Pennock | 38 | 146.2 | 9 | 5 | 4.60 | 54 |
| Danny MacFayden | 17 | 121.1 | 7 | 5 | 3.93 | 53 |
| Hank Johnson | 5 | 31.1 | 2 | 2 | 4.88 | 27 |
| Charlie Devens | 1 | 9.0 | 1 | 0 | 2.00 | 4 |

==== Other pitchers ====
Note: G = Games pitched; IP = Innings pitched; W = Wins; L = Losses; ERA = Earned run average; SO = Strikeouts

| Player | G | IP | W | L | ERA | SO |
|---|---|---|---|---|---|---|
| Johnny Allen | 33 | 192.0 | 17 | 4 | 3.70 | 109 |
| Jumbo Brown | 19 | 55.2 | 5 | 2 | 4.53 | 31 |
| Ivy Andrews | 7 | 24.2 | 2 | 1 | 1.82 | 7 |
| Gordon Rhodes | 10 | 24.0 | 1 | 2 | 7.88 | 15 |

==== Relief pitchers ====
Note: G = Games pitched; W = Wins; L = Losses; SV = Saves; ERA = Earned run average; SO = Strikeouts

| Player | G | W | L | SV | ERA | SO |
|---|---|---|---|---|---|---|
| Ed Wells | 22 | 3 | 3 | 2 | 4.26 | 13 |
| Wilcy Moore | 10 | 2 | 0 | 4 | 2.52 | 8 |
| Johnny Murphy | 2 | 0 | 0 | 0 | 16.20 | 2 |

== 1932 World Series ==
| Game | Date | Visitor | Score | Home | Score | Record (NYY-CHI) | Attendance |
|---|---|---|---|---|---|---|---|
| 1 | September 28 | Chicago Cubs | 6 | New York Yankees | 12 | 1–0 | 41,459 |
| 2 | September 29 | Chicago Cubs | 2 | New York Yankees | 5 | 2–0 | 50,709 |
| 3 | October 1 | New York Yankees | 7 | Chicago Cubs | 5 | 3–0 | 49,986 |
| 4 | October 2 | New York Yankees | 13 | Chicago Cubs | 6 | 4–0 | 49,844 |
New York Yankees win 4–0

=== Babe Ruth's called shot ===
Babe Ruth's called shot was the home run hit by Babe Ruth in the fifth inning of Game 3 of the 1932 World Series, held on October 1, 1932, at Wrigley Field in Chicago. During the at bat, Ruth made a pointing gesture, which existing film confirms, but the exact nature of his gesture is ambiguous. It was confirmed 88 years later in a radio clip by none other than Lou Gehrig, Ruth pointed to the center field bleachers during the at-bat. It was supposedly a declaration that he would hit a home run to this part of the park. On the next pitch, Ruth hit a home run to center field.

== Farm system ==
| Level | Team | League | Manager |
|---|---|---|---|
| AA | Newark Bears | International League | Al Mamaux |
| A | Springfield Rifles | Eastern League | Billy Meyer |
| B | Erie Sailors | Central League | Chief Bender and Bill McCorry |
| B | Binghamton Triplets | New York–Pennsylvania League | Heinie Groh and Billy Meyer |
| C | Cumberland Colts | Middle Atlantic League | Leo Mackey |

LEAGUE CHAMPIONS: Newark

Eastern League folded, July 17, 1932
