= Max Bishop =

American baseball player (1899–1962)

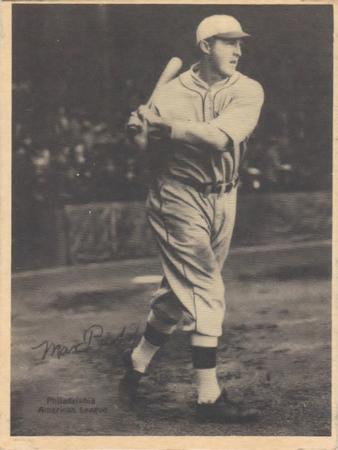
- Second baseman
- Born: September 5, 1899; Waynesboro, Pennsylvania, U.S.
- Died: February 24, 1962 (aged 62); Waynesboro, Pennsylvania, U.S.
- Batted: Left Threw: Right

MLB debut
- April 15, 1924, for the Philadelphia Athletics

Last MLB appearance
- September 21, 1935, for the Boston Red Sox

MLB statistics
- Batting average: .271
- Home runs: 41
- Runs batted in: 379
- Stats at Baseball Reference

Teams
- Philadelphia Athletics (1924–1933); Boston Red Sox (1934–1935)

Career highlights and awards
- 2× World Series champion (1929, 1930)

Max Frederick Bishop (September 5, 1899 – February 24, 1962) was an American professional baseball player, scout and manager. He played in Major League Baseball as a second baseman from 1924 through 1935, most notably as a member of the Philadelphia Athletics dynasty that won three consecutive American League pennants from 1929 to 1931 and won the World Series in 1929 and 1930. He played his final two seasons for the Boston Red Sox.

Bishop was the leadoff hitter for one of the most feared batting orders in the history of baseball featuring three future Baseball Hall of Fame members (Al Simmons, Jimmie Foxx, and Mickey Cochrane). Nicknamed "Camera Eye" for his ability to draw bases on balls, his .423 career on-base percentage ranks as the 15th highest in Major League Baseball history. His career ratio of bases on balls to plate appearances (.1996) ranks 3rd all-time for players with 1,000 or more bases on balls, and his career ratio of bases on balls to hits is the highest of any player in Major League Baseball history.

After his playing career Bishop served as baseball head coach at the U.S. Naval Academy from 1938 to 1962.

== Professional baseball career ==
Bishop was born in Waynesboro, Pennsylvania and his family moved to Baltimore when he was 14 years old. He attended Baltimore City College in 1918, and played as a second baseman for the college team that included future major league players Tommy Thomas and Johnny Neun. He began playing professionally with the Baltimore Orioles of the International League in 1918 where, he led the league in putouts and assists. He became a starting player for six seasons during which time the Orioles won the International League championship five times. His tenure in Baltimore would mark the beginning of his combination with shortstop Joe Boley for five years in Baltimore and five-plus years with the Athletics.

The Philadelphia Athletics purchased Bishop's contract from the Orioles on December 10, 1923, for $20,000. He made his major league debut with the Athletics on April 15, 1924 at the age of 24. Athletics manager Connie Mack installed Bishop as his leadoff hitter and urged him to become much more patient at home plate and to try to take a base on balls. Bishop became the Athletics' table-setter, whose job was to get on base in front of the more powerful hitters who followed in the batting order. With the Athletics, his teammates called him "Tilly" because of the way he held his arms stiff at his sides when he ran.

The Athletics finished in eighth place in Bishop's first year with the team but, became more competitive and for the next four years were either second or third in the American League standings. Between 1925 and 1928, Bishop recorded an on-base percentage above .400 and, in 1926 he led American League second basemen in fielding percentage.

In 1928, Bishop posted a career-high batting average of .316 and once again led American League second basemen in fielding percentage as the Athletics finished the season just 2½ games behind the vaunted New York Yankees of Babe Ruth and Lou Gehrig. In 1929, he led the American League with 117 bases on balls and scored 102 runs to help the Athletics win their first American League pennant in 15 years with a substantial 18 game lead over the second-place Yankees. The Athletics went on to win the 1929 World Series in five games from the Chicago Cubs.

The Athletics' success continued with two more American League pennants in 1930 and 1931 as, they defeated the St. Louis Cardinals in six games to win the 1930 World Series before losing to the Cardinals in their rematch in the 1931 World Series. Bishop played in all 18 of the World Series games, and handled all 69 fielding chances without an error.

In 1933, Bishop posted a .294 batting average along with a career-high on-base percentage of .446 but, with the onset of the Great Depression and declining attendance, Connie Mack sought to reduce expenses by selling or trading his best players. In September 1932, Mack had sold Simmons, Jimmy Dykes and Mule Haas to the Chicago White Sox for $100,000. In December 1933, Mack sent Lefty Grove, Rube Walberg and Bishop to the Boston Red Sox for Bob Kline, Rabbit Warstler and $125,000. By 1935, the Athletics had fallen to last place in the American League.

While with the Red Sox Bishop walked eight times in the doubleheader on July 8, 1934, setting a major-league record set in 1930. After two years in Boston, Bishop signed a contract with the Portland Beavers of the Pacific Coast League to be a player-manager but, was injured in his first game and was fired for being unable to play. He ended his playing career at the age of 36 in 1936 with the Baltimore Orioles of the International League and then scouted for the Detroit Tigers in 1937.

== Career statistics ==
In a twelve-year major league career, Bishop played in 1,338 games, accumulating 1,216 hits in 4,494 at bats for a .271 career batting average, along with 41 home runs and 379 runs batted in. His career on-base percentage of .423 is the 15th highest in Major League Baseball history. Bishop had a career fielding percentage of .976.

Bishop had the second-highest career secondary average among second basemen in Major League Baseball history behind only Joe Morgan. He collected 100 walks eight times, leading the AL with 128 in 1929; twice walked eight times in a doubleheader, to set a major league record; twice drew five walks in a single game, to become the only major leaguer to do this twice and recorded a 2.55 walk-to-strikeout ratio (1153-to-452), as his walk percentage of .204 is only surpassed by Ted Williams's .207. He also scored 100 or more runs during four consecutive seasons (1928–1931), with a career-high 117 in 1930. When Bishop scored 117 runs in 1930, he became the only man in major league history to score at least 70 runs while collecting more runs than hits.

Rated as one of the best fielders in the game, Bishop led AL second basemen four times in fielding percentage and played 18 World Series games without committing an error, recording 29 putouts and 40 assists in the 1929, 1930 and 1931 World Series. Baseball historian Bill James devised a Baseball IQ rating system which ranked Bishop second highest in baseball history behind only Joe Morgan.

== Later life ==
After his playing career had ended, Bishop served as baseball head coach at the U.S. Naval Academy between 1938 and 1962. During his 25 years as Navy Midshipmen coach, he posted a 306–143 record, including an academy seasonal record of 24 victories and two defeats in 1961.

Bishop died in his home of Waynesboro at age 62 while in town to attend the funeral of his mother, who died two days before him. The baseball stadium at the Naval Academy is named Max Bishop Stadium in his honor.
