= Bob Friedrichs =

American baseball player (1906-1997)

- Pitcher
- Born: August 30, 1906; Cincinnati, Ohio, U.S.
- Died: April 15, 1997 (aged 90); Jasper, Indiana, U.S.
- Batted: Right Threw: Right

MLB debut
- May 17, 1932, for the Washington Senators

Last MLB appearance
- May 21, 1932, for the Washington Senators

MLB statistics
- Games played: 2
- Innings pitched: 4
- Earned run average: 11.25
- Stats at Baseball Reference

Teams
- Washington Senators (1932)

Robert George Friedrichs (August 30, 1906 – April 15, 1997) was an American pitcher in Major League Baseball. He played for the Washington Senators.
