= Irv Stein =

American baseball player (1911-1981)

- Pitcher
- Born: April 21, 1911; Madisonville, Louisiana, U.S.
- Died: January 7, 1981 (aged 69); Covington, Louisiana, U.S.
- Batted: Right Threw: Right

MLB debut
- July 7, 1932, for the Philadelphia Athletics

Last MLB appearance
- July 7, 1932, for the Philadelphia Athletics

MLB statistics
- Win–loss record: 0-0
- Earned run average: 12.00
- Strikeouts: 0
- Stats at Baseball Reference

Teams
- Philadelphia Athletics (1932)

Irvin Michael Stein (May 21, 1911 – January 7, 1981) was an American Major League Baseball (MLB) pitcher who played in 1932 with the Philadelphia Athletics. He batted and threw right-handed.
