= Evar Swanson =

American baseball and football player (1902–1973)

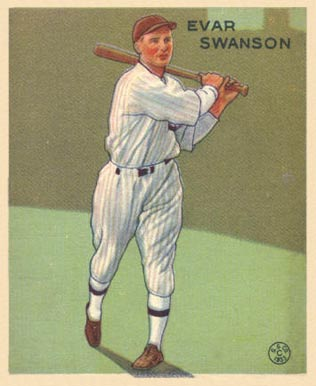
- Evar Swanson 1933 Goudey baseball card
- Outfielder
- Born: October 15, 1902; DeKalb, Illinois, U.S.
- Died: July 17, 1973 (aged 70); Galesburg, Illinois, U.S.
- Batted: Right Threw: Right

MLB debut
- April 18, 1929, for the Cincinnati Reds

Last MLB appearance
- September 30, 1934, for the Chicago White Sox

MLB statistics
- Batting average: .303
- Home runs: 7
- Runs batted in: 170
- Stats at Baseball Reference

Teams
- Cincinnati Reds (1929–1930); Chicago White Sox (1932–1934)

Ernest Evar Swanson (October 15, 1902 – July 17, 1973) was an American professional baseball and football player. He played outfield in the Major Leagues from 1929 to 1934. He would play for the Cincinnati Reds and Chicago White Sox. In the National Football League, he played running back for the Rock Island Independents, Milwaukee Badgers, and Chicago Cardinals from 1924 to 1927. He went to college and played three sports at Lombard College in Galesburg, Illinois.

Swanson was one of the fastest men in baseball in his time. During a contest held on September 15, 1929, between games of a doubleheader, he circled the bases in 13.3 seconds and that record still stands. (Some sources claim his time was 13.4.) On September 21, 1930, in a minor league field meet in Columbus, Ohio, Swanson circled the bases in 13.2 seconds, giving him also the fastest time as a minor leaguer.
