= Gowell Claset =

American baseball player (1907–1981)

- Pitcher
- Born: November 26, 1907; Battle Creek, Michigan, U.S.
- Died: March 8, 1981 (aged 73); St. Petersburg, Florida, U.S.
- Batted: Both Threw: Left

MLB debut
- April 12, 1933, for the Philadelphia Athletics

Last MLB appearance
- June 7, 1933, for the Philadelphia Athletics

MLB statistics (through 1933)
- Win–loss record: 2–0
- Earned run average: 9.53
- Strikeouts: 1
- WHIP: 3.000
- Stats at Baseball Reference

Teams
- Philadelphia Athletics (1933)

Gowell Sylvester Claset (November 26, 1907 – March 8, 1981) was an American Major League Baseball pitcher. He played for the Philadelphia Athletics during the 1933 season.
