= Danny Musser =

American baseball player (1905-2000)

- Third baseman
- Born: September 5, 1905; Zion, Pennsylvania, U.S.
- Died: March 2, 2000 (aged 94); Upper Sandusky, Ohio, U.S.
- Batted: Left Threw: Right

MLB debut
- September 18, 1932, for the Washington Senators

Last MLB appearance
- September 18, 1932, for the Washington Senators

MLB statistics
- Batting average: .500
- Home runs: 0
- RBI: 0
- Stats at Baseball Reference

Teams
- Washington Senators (1932)

William Daniel Musser (September 5, 1905 – March 2, 2000) was an American Major League Baseball third baseman who played for the Washington Senators in 1932. He played in only one game in his entire career, collecting one hit in two at-bats.

Musser, who was born in Zion, Pennsylvania, played his only game on September 18, 1932, at the age of 27. As a 5'9½", 160-pound athlete who threw right-handed but batted left-handed, Musser didn't get the chance to make a play in the field.

On March 2, 2000, Musser died in Upper Sandusky, Ohio, at the age of 94. He was one of the oldest players to die in 2000, behind only Lou Polli (who was 99) and Clyde Sukeforth (who was 98).
