= Art Evans (baseball) =

American baseball player (1911–1952)

- Pitcher
- Born: August 3, 1911; Elvins, Missouri, U.S.
- Died: January 8, 1952 (aged 40); Wichita, Kansas, U.S.
- Batted: Both Threw: Left

MLB debut
- June 20, 1932, for the Chicago White Sox

Last MLB appearance
- July 13, 1932, for the Chicago White Sox

MLB statistics
- Win–loss record: 0–0
- Earned run average: 3.00
- Strikeouts: 6
- Stats at Baseball Reference

Teams
- Chicago White Sox (1932)

William Arthur Evans (August 3, 1911 – January 8, 1952) was an American professional baseball pitcher who played for the Chicago White Sox of Major League Baseball in 1932.
