= Art Smith (baseball) =

American baseball player (1906–1995)

- Pitcher
- Born: June 21, 1906; Boston, Massachusetts, U.S.
- Died: November 22, 1995 (aged 89); Norwalk, Connecticut, U.S.
- Batted: Right Threw: Right

MLB debut
- June 9, 1932, for the Chicago White Sox

Last MLB appearance
- June 13, 1932, for the Chicago White Sox

MLB statistics
- Win–loss record: 0–1
- Earned run average: 11.57
- Strikeouts: 1
- Stats at Baseball Reference

Teams
- Chicago White Sox (1932)

Arthur Laird Smith (June 21, 1906 – November 22, 1995) was an American professional baseball pitcher who played for the Chicago White Sox of Major League Baseball in 1932.
