= Al Reiss =

American baseball player (1909-1989)

- Shortstop
- Born: January 8, 1909; Elizabeth, New Jersey
- Died: May 13, 1989 (aged 80); Red Bank, New Jersey
- Batted: Both Threw: Right

MLB debut
- June 22, 1932, for the Philadelphia Athletics

Last MLB appearance
- August 13, 1932, for the Philadelphia Athletics

MLB statistics
- Batting average: .200
- Home runs: 0
- Runs batted in: 1
- Stats at Baseball Reference

Teams
- Philadelphia Athletics (1932)

Albert Allen Reiss (January 8, 1909 – May 13, 1989) was an American Major League Baseball shortstop who played for the Philadelphia Athletics during the 1932 season, with one run batted in.

== Bibliography ==
- Career statistics from Baseball Reference · Baseball Reference (Minors) · Retrosheet · Baseball Almanac
