= Tim McKeithan =

American baseball player

- Pitcher
- Born: November 2, 1906; Shelby, North Carolina, U.S.
- Died: August 30, 1969 (aged 62); Forest City, North Carolina, U.S.
- Batted: Right Threw: Right

MLB debut
- July 21, 1932, for the Philadelphia Athletics

Last MLB appearance
- May 20, 1934, for the Philadelphia Athletics

MLB statistics
- Win–loss record: 1–1
- Earned run average: 7.36
- Strikeouts: 3
- Stats at Baseball Reference

Teams
- Philadelphia Athletics (1932–1934)

Emmett James "Tim" McKeithan (November 2, 1906 – August 30, 1969) was an American Major League Baseball player who was a pitcher with the Philadelphia Athletics of the American League from 1932 until 1934. He was 6-foot-2-inch (1.88 m), weighed 182-pound (83 kg), while batting and throwing right-handed.

== Early life ==
Emmett James McKeithan was born on November 2, 1906 in Shelby, North Carolina. He attended Cool Springs High School in Forest City, North Carolina. McKeithan played college baseball for Duke University. His brother, Dick McKeithan, played in the Carolina League.

== Baseball career ==
After his college career, he signed a contract with the Philadelphia Athletics of the American League (AL), and joined the team for the 1932 season without having played in minor league baseball. He made his Major League Baseball debut on July 21, 1932, in the ninth inning of a game versus the St. Louis Browns. In one inning, he surrendered one run and did not receive a decision in the 5–3 loss. In his next appearance, on July 28, he started and pitched 2 1/3 innings in a loss to the Detroit Tigers. After making a short relief appearance on August 19, he started his second game of the season on September 24 against the Washington Senators. He pitched the first nine innings of the game and the score was tied 7-7. His relief then allowed a run in the 10th inning, and the Athletics lost.

McKeithan began the 1933 baseball season with the Montreal Royals, a class-AA team in the International League. In 45 appearances for the Royals, he had an 8–6 win–loss record (W–L), and a 4.80 earned run average (ERA) in 148 innings pitched. He then re-joined the Athletics in September, appearing in three additional games, including four innings of relief on September 18. He received the victory against the Tigers, allowed one run and struck out three batters, and connected for a base hit in his only at bat. His three strikeouts were the only three of his MLB pitching career.

He returned to the Athletics for the 1934 season, and made his first appearance on April 18. He finished the game with two innings of relief and surrendered an eighth-inning home run to Babe Ruth, the first that he had allowed in his career. It is claimed that this was the longest home run hit by Ruth in his career. In May, he made two one-inning relief appearances, and allowed two runs to score in each, raising his season's ERA to 15.75. On May 22, the Athletics released him from the team. His final MLB totals include 25 2/3 innings pitched in 10 games, and a 7.36 ERA.

McKeithan finished out the 1934 season with the Syracuse Chiefs of the IL, the class-AA affiliate of the Boston Red Sox. His win-loss record was 3-7 for the Chiefs in 22 appearances, and had a 6.21 ERA in 87 innings pitched. The following season, his last as a professional, he played for the Galveston Buccaneers of the Texas League, which was a class-A league. In eight games, his W–L record was 2–3 in 20 innings pitched.

== Post-baseball ==
After his baseball career, he worked as a salesman, and later owned a nursing home in Forest City, North Carolina. On August 30, 1969, McKeithan was shot in the stomach by man and died in Forest City. He is interred at Concord Baptist Church Cemetery in Bostic, North Carolina.

McKeithan's great-nephew, Joel McKeithan, is a hitting coach in MLB.

== Bibliography ==
- Russo, Frank; Gene Racz (2006). Bury My Heart at Cooperstown: Salacious, Sad, and Surreal Deaths in the History of Baseball. Triumph Books. ISBN 9781617499364.
- Utley, R. G.; Scott Verner (2005). The Independent Carolina Baseball League, 1936–1938: Baseball Outlaws. McFarland & Company. ISBN 9780786482061.
