= Bruce Campbell (baseball) =

American baseball player (1909–1995)

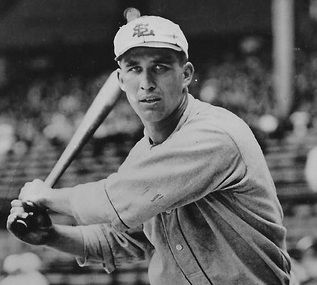
- Campbell, circa 1932–34
- Right fielder
- Born: October 20, 1909; Chicago, Illinois, U.S.
- Died: June 17, 1995 (aged 85); Fort Myers Beach, Florida, U.S.
- Batted: Left Threw: Right

MLB debut
- September 12, 1930, for the Chicago White Sox

Last MLB appearance
- September 23, 1942, for the Washington Senators

MLB statistics
- Batting average: .290
- Home runs: 106
- Runs batted in: 766
- Stats at Baseball Reference

Teams
- Chicago White Sox (1930–1932); St. Louis Browns (1932–1934); Cleveland Indians (1935–1939); Detroit Tigers (1940–1941); Washington Senators (1942)

Bruce Douglas Campbell (October 20, 1909 – June 17, 1995) was an American professional baseball right fielder from 1930 to 1942. Campbell began his Major League Baseball (MLB) career with the Chicago White Sox, but had very little playing time in the major leagues. In 1932, Campbell was traded from the White Sox to the St. Louis Browns, with Bump Hadley, for Red Kress. In St. Louis, Campbell was a starting outfielder, and performed well, driving in 106 runs in 1933. In the 1935 season, Campbell played with the Cleveland Indians, after being traded for multiple players and cash. In Cleveland, Campbell hit for considerably higher averages than he had in St. Louis, although injuries limited his playing time.

On July 2, 1936, as a member of the Indians, Campbell went 7–7 in a doubleheader against the St. Louis Browns. In the first game, he went 6–6 with 5 RBI in a 14–6 win. In the second game, he singled in one at-bat, then left the game.

In January 1940, the Indians traded Campbell to the Detroit Tigers for Beau Bell. The trade worked out for Campbell, as the Tigers won the American League pennant, and Campbell played all seven games of the 1940 World Series. Campbell had nine hits, four walks, scored four runs, five runs batted in and a home run in the World Series, with a batting average of .360, on-base percentage of .448 and slugging percentage of .520.

Campbell later played for the Washington Senators. In a 13-season career, he was a .290 hitter with 1,382 hits, 295 doubles, 87 triples, 106 home runs, 759 runs scored, 766 RBI and 53 stolen bases in 1,360 games played. He was named "Most Courageous Athlete of the Year" in 1936 by the Philadelphia sports writers. He was stricken with spinal meningitis in 1935 and given a 50–50 chance of living. Campbell joined the service in World War II and spent 38 months in the Army Air Corps. Campbell returned from the war and played in the minor leagues in 1946 with Buffalo Bisons and Minneapolis Millers at age 36 before retiring.

Campbell was inducted into the Lyons Township High School Hall of Fame in 1995.

== See also ==
- List of Major League Baseball single-game hits leaders
