= Pete Daglia =

American baseball player (1906–1952)

- Pitcher
- Born: February 28, 1906; Napa, California, U.S.
- Died: March 11, 1952 (aged 46); Willits, California U.S.
- Batted: Right Threw: Right

MLB debut
- June 8, 1932, for the Chicago White Sox

Last MLB appearance
- July 27, 1932, for the Chicago White Sox

MLB statistics
- Win–loss record: 2-4
- Earned run average: 5.76
- Strikeouts: 16
- Stats at Baseball Reference

Teams
- Chicago White Sox (1932)

Peter George Daglia (February 28, 1906 – March 11, 1952) was an American professional baseball pitcher who played one season for the Chicago White Sox of Major League Baseball.
