= Bill Lawrence (baseball) =

American baseball player (1906–1997)

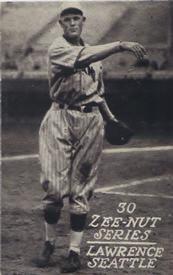
- Outfielder
- Born: March 11, 1906; San Mateo, California
- Died: June 15, 1997 (aged 91); Redwood City, California
- Batted: Right Threw: Right

MLB debut
- April 13, 1932, for the Detroit Tigers

Last MLB appearance
- July 21, 1932, for the Detroit Tigers

MLB statistics
- Batting average: .217
- Home runs: 0
- Runs batted in: 3
- Stats at Baseball Reference

Teams
- Detroit Tigers (1932)

William Henry Lawrence (March 11, 1906 – June 15, 1997) was a professional baseball player. He played part of one season in Major League Baseball with the Detroit Tigers in 1932, primarily as an outfielder.

Lawrence also had an extensive minor league baseball career, playing fifteen seasons from 1929 until 1943. In all but two of those seasons, he spent at least part of the season playing in Seattle for the Indians and, later, the Rainiers of the Pacific Coast League.

Lawrence died on June 15, 1997. He was interred at Cypress Lawn Memorial Park.

== Sources ==
- Career statistics from Baseball Reference · Baseball Reference (Minors) · Retrosheet · Baseball Almanac
