= Clarence Fieber =

American baseball player (1913–1985)

- Pitcher
- Born: September 4, 1913; San Francisco, California, U.S.
- Died: August 20, 1985 (aged 71); Redwood City, California, U.S.
- Batted: Left Threw: Left

MLB debut
- May 18, 1932, for the Chicago White Sox

Last MLB appearance
- May 26, 1932, for the Chicago White Sox

MLB statistics
- Win–loss record: 1–0
- Earned run average: 1.69
- Strikeouts: 1
- Stats at Baseball Reference

Teams
- Chicago White Sox (1932)

Clarence Thomas Fieber (September 4, 1913 – August 20, 1985), nicknamed "Lefty", was an American professional baseball pitcher who played for the Chicago White Sox of Major League Baseball in 1932.
