= Bobby Coombs =

American baseball player (1908-1991)

- Pitcher
- Born: February 2, 1908; Goodwins Mills, Maine, U.S.
- Died: October 21, 1991 (aged 83); Ogunquit, Maine, U.S.
- Batted: Right Threw: Right

MLB debut
- June 8, 1933, for the Philadelphia Athletics

Last MLB appearance
- June 6, 1943, for the New York Giants

MLB statistics
- Win–loss record: 0–2
- Earned run average: 9.32
- Strikeouts: 13
- Stats at Baseball Reference

Teams
- Philadelphia Athletics (1933); New York Giants (1943)

Raymond Franklin "Bobby" Coombs (February 2, 1908 – October 21, 1991) was an American Major League Baseball pitcher. The 5 ft 9 1/2 in (1.77 m), 160 lb (73 kg) right-hander played for the Philadelphia Athletics (1933) and New York Giants (1943). His career was unusual in that he went almost ten years between major league appearances.

Coombs pitched at Phillips Exeter Academy and for the Duke Blue Devils baseball team where he was coached by his uncle, Jack Coombs.

A native of Goodwins Mills, Maine, Coombs made his major league debut in relief on June 8, 1933, in a home game against the New York Yankees at Shibe Park. His final game, almost ten years later at the age of 35, was in a doubleheader against the Pittsburgh Pirates at Forbes Field on June 6, 1943.

Coombs' career totals include 30 games pitched, all in relief, a 0–2 record with 17 games finished, 2 saves, 49 earned runs allowed in 47 1/3 innings, and an ERA of 9.32.

Coombs coached at Williams College from 1946 to 1973, where there is now a Bobby Coombs Field.

Coombs died at the age of 83 in Ogunquit, Maine.
