= Ed Edelen =

American baseball player (1912–1982)

- Edelen during his baseball career
- Born: March 16, 1912; Bryantown, Maryland, U.S.
- Died: February 1, 1982 (aged 69); La Plata, Maryland, U.S.
- Education: Mount St. Mary's University; Georgetown University School of Medicine
- Occupation: General practitioner
- Years active: 1938–1982
- Baseball career
- Pitcher
- Batted: Right Threw: Right

MLB debut
- August 20, 1932, for the Washington Senators

Last MLB appearance
- August 21, 1932, for the Washington Senators

MLB statistics
- Win–loss record: 0–0
- Earned run average: 27.00
- Strikeouts: 0
- Stats at Baseball Reference

Teams
- Washington Senators (1932)

Edward Joseph "Doc" Edelen Jr. (March 16, 1912 – February 1, 1982) was an American physician and professional baseball player. He briefly played for the Washington Senators before having a lengthy career as a doctor in Charles County, Maryland. For part of his career he was president of Physicians Memorial Hospital (now University of Maryland Charles Regional Medical Center).

== Biography ==
Born in Bryantown, Maryland, Edelen was a descendant on his mother's side of Dr. Samuel Mudd who was famous for his involvement in the assassination of Abraham Lincoln. Edelen attended Mount St. Mary's College in Emmitsburg, Maryland, where he played varsity baseball, basketball, and football. He played in two games for the Washington Senators during the 1932 season. He pitched a total of one inning over the two games giving up three runs.

Edelen attended Georgetown University School of Medicine, from which he graduated in 1937. He then worked as an intern at Providence Hospital in Washington, D.C. before settling in Port Tobacco Village, Maryland. He practiced medicine in Charles County for the remainder of his career; notably serving for a period as president of Physicians Memorial Hospital (now University of Maryland Charles Regional Medical Center). He worked as a doctor in general practice from 1938 to 1982.

He died in La Plata, Maryland, at the age of 69.
