= Buck Marrow =

American baseball player (1909–1982)

- Pitcher
- Born: August 29, 1909; Tarboro, North Carolina, U.S.
- Died: November 21, 1982 (aged 73); Newport News, Virginia, U.S.
- Batted: Right Threw: Right

MLB debut
- July 3, 1932, for the Detroit Tigers

Last MLB appearance
- July 4, 1938, for the Brooklyn Dodgers

MLB statistics
- Win–loss record: 3–8
- Earned run average: 5.06
- Strikeouts: 39
- Stats at Baseball Reference

Teams
- Detroit Tigers (1932); Brooklyn Dodgers (1937–1938)

Charles Kennon "Buck" Marrow (August 29, 1909 – November 21, 1982), was an American professional baseball player who pitched in the Major Leagues in 1932 and 1937–38. He played for the Brooklyn Dodgers and Detroit Tigers.

Born in Tarboro, North Carolina, Marrow died on November 21, 1982, in Newport News, Virginia.
