= Carey Selph =

American baseball player (1901–1976)

- Third baseman
- Born: December 5, 1901; Donaldson, Arkansas, U.S.
- Died: February 24, 1976 (aged 74); Houston, Texas, U.S.
- Batted: Right Threw: Right

MLB debut
- May 25, 1929, for the St. Louis Cardinals

Last MLB appearance
- September 18, 1932, for the Chicago White Sox

MLB statistics
- Batting average: .277
- Home runs: 0
- Runs batted in: 58
- Stats at Baseball Reference

Teams
- St. Louis Cardinals (1929); Chicago White Sox (1932)

Carey Isom Selph (December 5, 1901 – February 24, 1976) was an American professional baseball infielder who played two seasons in Major League Baseball.

He played college football for the Ouachita Baptist Tigers from 1922 to 1925. He was later inducted into the Ouachita Athletics Hall of Fame in 2004.

Selph began his professional baseball career in 1926 with the Fort Smith Twins, scoring an 169 runs. He was soon acquired by the St. Louis Cardinals, and finished the season with the Syracuse Chiefs. After spending 1928 with the Houston Buffaloes in the Texas League, he made his major league debut in 1929 for the Cardinals. In 25 games, Selph played mostly as a second baseman, batting .235.

After two seasons back in the minor leagues with the Buffaloes, Selph was drafted from the Cardinals by the Chicago White Sox on September 30, 1931 in the Rule 5 draft. He played 116 games for the White Sox in 1932, mostly at third base, batting .283 with 51 RBI. After the season, he was traded back to the Cardinals and never played in the majors again. He played two more seasons with the Buffaloes, serving as a player-manager for them in 1933-34.

Selph was elected to the Texas League Hall of Fame in 2007.

== Sources ==
- Career statistics from Baseball Reference · Baseball Reference (Minors) · Retrosheet · Baseball Almanac
- Carey Selph at SABR (Baseball BioProject)
