= Phil Gallivan =

American baseball player (1907–1969)

- Pitcher
- Born: May 29, 1907; Seattle, Washington, U.S.
- Died: November 24, 1969 (aged 62); St. Paul, Minnesota, U.S.
- Batted: Right Threw: Right

MLB debut
- April 21, 1931, for the Brooklyn Robins

Last MLB appearance
- September 29, 1934, for the Chicago White Sox

MLB statistics
- Win–loss record: 5-11
- Earned run average: 5.95
- Strikeouts: 68
- Stats at Baseball Reference

Teams
- Brooklyn Robins (1931); Chicago White Sox (1932, 1934)

Philip Joseph Gallivan (May 29, 1907 – November 24, 1969) was an American professional baseball pitcher in Major League Baseball. Born in Seattle, Washington, he pitched for the 1931 Brooklyn Robins and then for the Chicago White Sox in 1932 and 1934. He died in St. Paul, Minnesota on November 24, 1969.

He is buried in Hudson, Wisconsin.
