= Archie Wise =

American baseball player (1912–1978)

- Pitcher
- Born: July 31, 1912; Waxahachie, Texas, U.S.
- Died: February 2, 1978 (aged 65); Dallas, Texas, U.S.
- Batted: Right Threw: Right

MLB debut
- July 24, 1932, for the Chicago White Sox

Last MLB appearance
- July 27, 1932, for the Chicago White Sox

MLB statistics
- Win–loss record: 0–0
- Earned run average: 4.91
- Strikeouts: 2
- Stats at Baseball Reference

Teams
- Chicago White Sox (1932)

Archibald Edwin Wise (July 31, 1912 – February 2, 1978) was an American professional baseball player. A right-handed pitcher, he appeared in two games in Major League Baseball for the Chicago White Sox in 1932. For his career, he recorded no decisions, with a 4.91 earned run average, and two strikeouts in 7.1 innings pitched.

Wise was born in Waxahachie, Texas, and died in Dallas, Texas at the age of 65.
