= Charlie Biggs =

American baseball player (1906–1954)

- Pitcher
- Born: September 15, 1906; French Lick, Indiana, U.S.
- Died: May 24, 1954 (aged 47); French Lick, Indiana, U.S.
- Batted: Right Threw: Right

MLB debut
- September 3, 1932, for the Chicago White Sox

Last MLB appearance
- September 24, 1932, for the Chicago White Sox

MLB statistics
- Win–loss record: 1–1
- Earned run average: 6.93
- Strikeouts: 1
- Stats at Baseball Reference

Teams
- Chicago White Sox (1932)

Charles Orval Biggs (September 15, 1906 – May 24, 1954) was an American professional baseball pitcher who played for the Chicago White Sox of Major League Baseball in 1932.
