= Hank Winston =

American baseball player (1904-1974)

- Pitcher
- Born: June 15, 1904; Youngsville, North Carolina, U.S.
- Died: February 4, 1974 (aged 69); Jacksonville, Florida, U.S.
- Batted: Left Threw: Right

MLB debut
- September 30, 1933, for the Philadelphia Athletics

Last MLB appearance
- September 24, 1936, for the Brooklyn Dodgers

MLB statistics
- Win–loss record: 1–3
- Earned run average: 6.23
- Strikeouts: 10
- Stats at Baseball Reference

Teams
- Philadelphia Athletics (1933); Brooklyn Dodgers (1936)

Henry Rudolph Winston (June 15, 1904 – February 4, 1974) was an American professional baseball pitcher. He played parts of two seasons in Major League Baseball (MLB) for the 1933 Philadelphia Athletics and the 1936 Brooklyn Dodgers.

Winston made his MLB debut with the Athletics on September 30, 1933, against the Boston Red Sox at Shibe Park, pitching 6 2/3 innings in relief surrendering 5 earned runs. The Athletics released him the following March. He returned to the majors in 1936 with the Dodgers pitching in 14 games. His only win came on August 15 against the Boston Bees at Ebbets Field when he pitched 5 relief innings in the Dodgers' 6–2 victory.

Born in Youngsville, North Carolina, Winston died in Jacksonville, Florida, in February 1974 at the age of 69.
