= Ed Cihocki =

American baseball player (1907-1987)

- Shortstop
- Born: May 9, 1907; Wilmington, Delaware
- Died: November 9, 1987 (aged 80); Newark, Delaware
- Batted: Right Threw: Right

MLB debut
- May 29, 1932, for the Philadelphia Athletics

Last MLB appearance
- September 30, 1933, for the Philadelphia Athletics

MLB statistics
- Batting average: .143
- Home runs: 0
- Runs batted in: 9
- Stats at Baseball Reference

Teams
- Philadelphia Athletics (1932–1933)

Edward Joseph Cihocki (May 9, 1907 – November 9, 1987) was a professional baseball player. Nicknamed "Cy", he was a shortstop over parts of two seasons (1932–33) with the Philadelphia Athletics. For his career, he compiled a .143 batting average in 98 at-bats, with nine runs batted in.

He was born in Wilmington, Delaware and died in Newark, Delaware at the age of 80. He was inducted into the Delaware Sports Museum and Hall of Fame in 1981.
