= Dib Williams =

American baseball player (1910–1992)

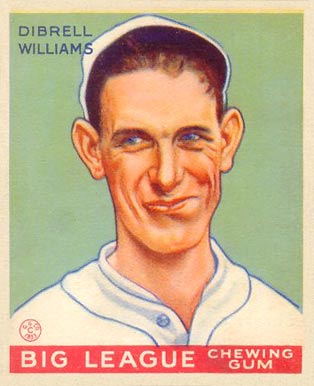
- Infielder
- Born: January 19, 1910; Greenbrier, Arkansas, U.S.
- Died: April 2, 1992 (aged 82); Searcy, Arkansas, U.S.
- Batted: Right Threw: Right

MLB debut
- April 27, 1930, for the Philadelphia Athletics

Last MLB appearance
- September 29, 1935, for the Boston Red Sox

MLB statistics
- Batting average: .267
- Home runs: 29
- Runs batted in: 201
- Stats at Baseball Reference

Teams
- Philadelphia Athletics (1930–1935); Boston Red Sox (1935)

Edwin Dibrell Williams (January 19, 1910 – April 2, 1992) was an American professional baseball infielder who played in Major League Baseball (MLB) from 1930 to 1935 with the Philadelphia Athletics and Boston Red Sox. Listed at 5 feet 11 inches (1.80 m) and 175 pounds (79 kg), he batted and threw right-handed.

== Biography ==
Williams was born in 1910 in Greenbrier, Arkansas, and attended Hendrix College and Oklahoma A&M (now Oklahoma State University). At Hendrix, he played college basketball, college football, and competed in track and field. At Oklahoma A&M, he played on the non-varsity baseball team in 1928, was a quarterback on the football team—earning a varsity letter in 1926, 1927, and 1928—and was a member of Lambda Chi Alpha.

Williams' professional baseball career spanned 1929 to 1947; he missed the 1943–1945 seasons while serving in the United States Army. Primarily a second baseman, he played every infield position, and one game as a left fielder, during his time playing professionally.

Williams played in Major League Baseball with the Philadelphia Athletics from 1930 to 1935, including all seven games of the Athletics' loss to the St. Louis Cardinals in the 1931 World Series. Williams' contract was sold to the Boston Red Sox on May 1, 1935, and he finished the year with Boston, his final major league season. In six major league seasons, Williams compiled a .267 batting average with 29 home runs and 201 runs batted in in 475 games played. Defensively, he had a .955 fielding percentage in 215 games at second base, and fielded .930 in 195 games at shortstop.

In addition to playing professionally as late as 1947, Williams managed minor league teams in 1941 and 1946–1948.

Williams died in 1992 at age 82 in Searcy, Arkansas, and was buried in his hometown of Greenbrier.
