= 1871 Fort Wayne Kekiongas season =

1871 Fort Wayne Kekiongas
- League: National Association of Professional Base Ball Players
- Ballpark: Kekionga Ball Grounds
- City: Fort Wayne, Indiana
- Record: 7–12 (.368)
- League place: 7th
- Managers: Bill Lennon, Harry Deane

The Fort Wayne Kekiongas played their first and only season in 1871 as a charter member of the National Association of Professional Base Ball Players. They finished seventh in the league with a record of 7−12.

== First game ==
The honor of playing the first game of the newly organized National Association of Professional Baseball Players was decided by coin flip.

Bobby Mathews, 5 ft 5 in (1.65 m), 140 lbs, and 20 years old, hurled a 2−0 shutout for the Kekiongas. Deacon White, catcher for the Cleveland Forest Citys got 3 hits in 4 at-bats; the other Cleveland players only shared 2 hits among them. Deacon White scored the first hit, the first extra-base hit (a double) and was the first to hit into a double-play.

The game was rained out in the top of the 9th inning. Attendance was 200.

Bobby Mathews, who went on to play five seasons each in the National Association, National League, and American Association, is the only player ever to pitch 100 games or to win at least 50 in three different major leagues. He is credited with inventing the spitball and the out-curve. Deacon White was another historic player, ending his 22-year career as playing owner of Buffalo's Brotherhood team.

== Regular season ==
Picture of the 1871 Fort Wayne Kekiongas

=== Season standings ===
Pos	Team	Pld	W	L	T	RF	RA	RD	PCT	GB
1	Philadelphia Athletics (C)	28	21	7	0	376	266	+110	.750	—
2	Chicago White Stockings	28	19	9	0	302	241	+61	.679	2
3	Boston Red Stockings	31	20	10	1	401	303	+98	.661	2
4	Washington Olympics	32	15	15	2	310	303	+7	.500	7
5	New York Mutuals	33	16	17	0	302	313	−11	.485	7.5
6	Troy Haymakers	29	13	15	1	351	362	−11	.466	8
7	Fort Wayne Kekiongas	19	7	12	0	137	243	−106	.368	9.5
8	Cleveland Forest Citys	29	10	19	0	249	341	−92	.345	11.5
9	Rockford Forest Citys	25	4	21	0	231	287	−56	.160	15.5

Source: Baseball Reference
(C) Champions

=== Record vs. opponents ===
1871 National Association Records Sources:
Team	BOS	CHI	CLE	FW	NY	PHI	ROC	TRO	WSH
Boston	—	1–3	3–1	2–0	2–2	3–1	3–0	3–2	3–1–1
Chicago	3–1	—	2–1	2–0	3–1	2–3	3–0	1–1	3–2
Cleveland	1–3	1–2	—	0–3	3–2	0–3	3–1	2–2	0–3
Fort Wayne	0–2	0–2	3–0	—	1–2	0–2	1–1	1–1	1–2
New York	2–2	1–3	2–3	2–1	—	2–3	3–1	1–3	3–1
Philadelphia	1–3	3–2	3–0	2–0	3–2	—	3–0	3–0	3–0
Rockford	0–3	0–3	1–3	1–1	1–3	0–3	—	1–2	0–3
Troy	2–3	1–1	2–2	1–1	3–1	0–3	2–1	—	2–3–1
Washington	1–3–1	2–3	3–0	2–1	1–3	0–3	3–0	3–2–1	—

=== Roster ===
1871 Fort Wayne Kekiongas
Roster
Pitchers: Bobby Mathews	Catchers: Bill Barrett; Bill Lennon; Paddy Quinn; Infielders: Charles Bierman; Tom Carey; Harry Deane; Jim Foran; Wally Goldsmith; Jimmy Hallinan; James McDermott; Nealy Phelps; Frank Sellman	Outfielders: Bob Armstrong; Pete Donnelly; Bill Kelly; Henry Kohler; Ed Mincher	Manager: Harry Deane; Bill Lennon

== Player stats ==
=== Batting ===
==== Starters by position ====
Note: Pos = Position; G = Games played; AB = At bats; H = Hits; Avg. = Batting average; HR = Home runs; RBI = Runs batted in

Pos	Player	G	AB	H	Avg.	HR	RBI
C	Bill Lennon	12	48	11	.229	0	5
1B	Jim Foran	19	89	31	.348	1	18
2B	Tom Carey	19	87	20	.230	0	10
SS	Wally Goldsmith	19	88	18	.205	0	12
3B	Frank Sellman	14	65	15	.231	1	10
OF	Pete Donnelly	9	34	7	.206	0	3
OF	Robert Armstrong	12	49	11	.224	0	5
OF	Bill Kelly	18	67	15	.224	0	7

==== Other batters ====
Note: G = Games played; AB = At bats; H = Hits; Avg. = Batting average; HR = Home runs; RBI = Runs batted in

Player	G	AB	H	Avg.	HR	RBI
Ed Mincher	9	36	8	.222	0	5
Jimmy Hallinan	5	25	5	.200	0	2
Harry Deane	6	22	4	.182	0	2
Paddy Quinn	5	17	4	.235	0	2
Henry Kohler	3	12	2	.167	0	1
Joe McDermott	2	8	2	.250	0	1
Bill Barrett	1	5	1	.200	0	1
Nealy Phelps	1	3	0	.000	0	0
Charles Bierman	1	2	0	.000	0	0

=== Pitching ===
==== Starting pitchers ====
Note: G = Games pitched; IP = Innings pitched; W = Wins; L = Losses; ERA = Earned run average; SO = Strikeouts

Player	G	IP	W	L	ERA	SO
Bobby Mathews	19	169.0	6	11	5.17	17
