= List of Major League Baseball annual shutout leaders =

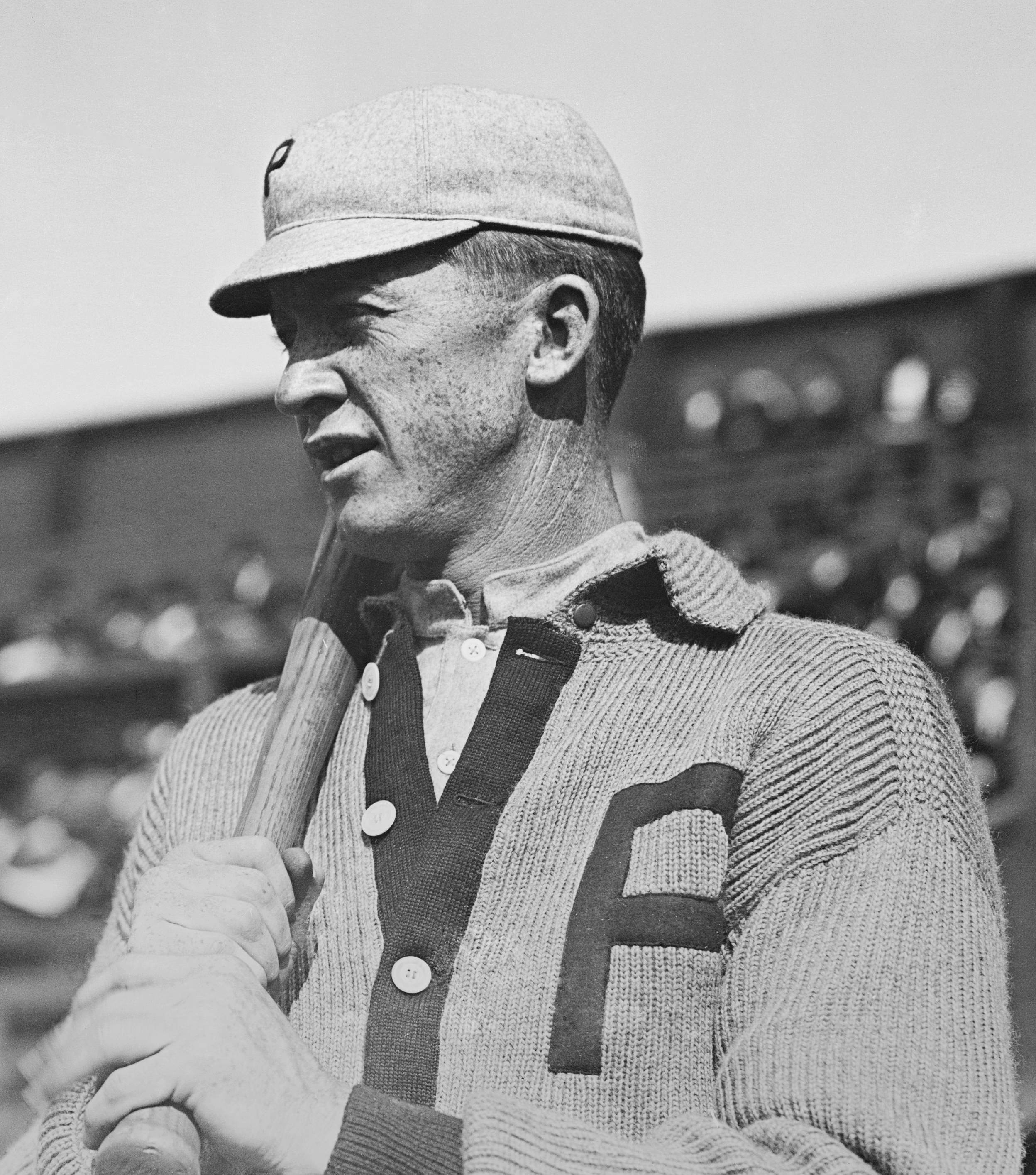
Pete Alexander (along with George Bradley) holds the single-season shutout record with 16. His career total of 90 is ranked second all-time to Walter Johnson's 110 shutouts.

The following is a list of annual leaders in shutouts in Major League Baseball (MLB). A shutout occurs when a single pitcher throws a complete game and does not allow the opposing team to score a single run.

Walter Johnson holds the career shutout record with 110. The most shutouts pitched in one season was 16, which was a feat accomplished by both Pete Alexander (1916) and George Bradley (1876). In the dead-ball era and throughout much of the first three-quarters of the twentieth century, starting pitchers were generally expected to perform complete games, and starting pitchers would throw dozens of complete games a year — thereby increasing a pitcher's chances of achieving a shutout. These shutout records are among the most secure records in baseball, as pitchers today rarely earn more than one or two shutouts per season with the heavy emphasis on pitch counts and relief pitching. Pitchers today will often pitch only a few, if any, complete games a season. The 2018 season marked a new low for complete-game shutouts; no pitcher threw for more than one shutout during the season, with eleven American League and seven National League pitchers finishing with only one shutout that season. Since then, there have been twelve combined occasions in which multiple pitchers in each league threw only one shutout in a season.

== American League ==
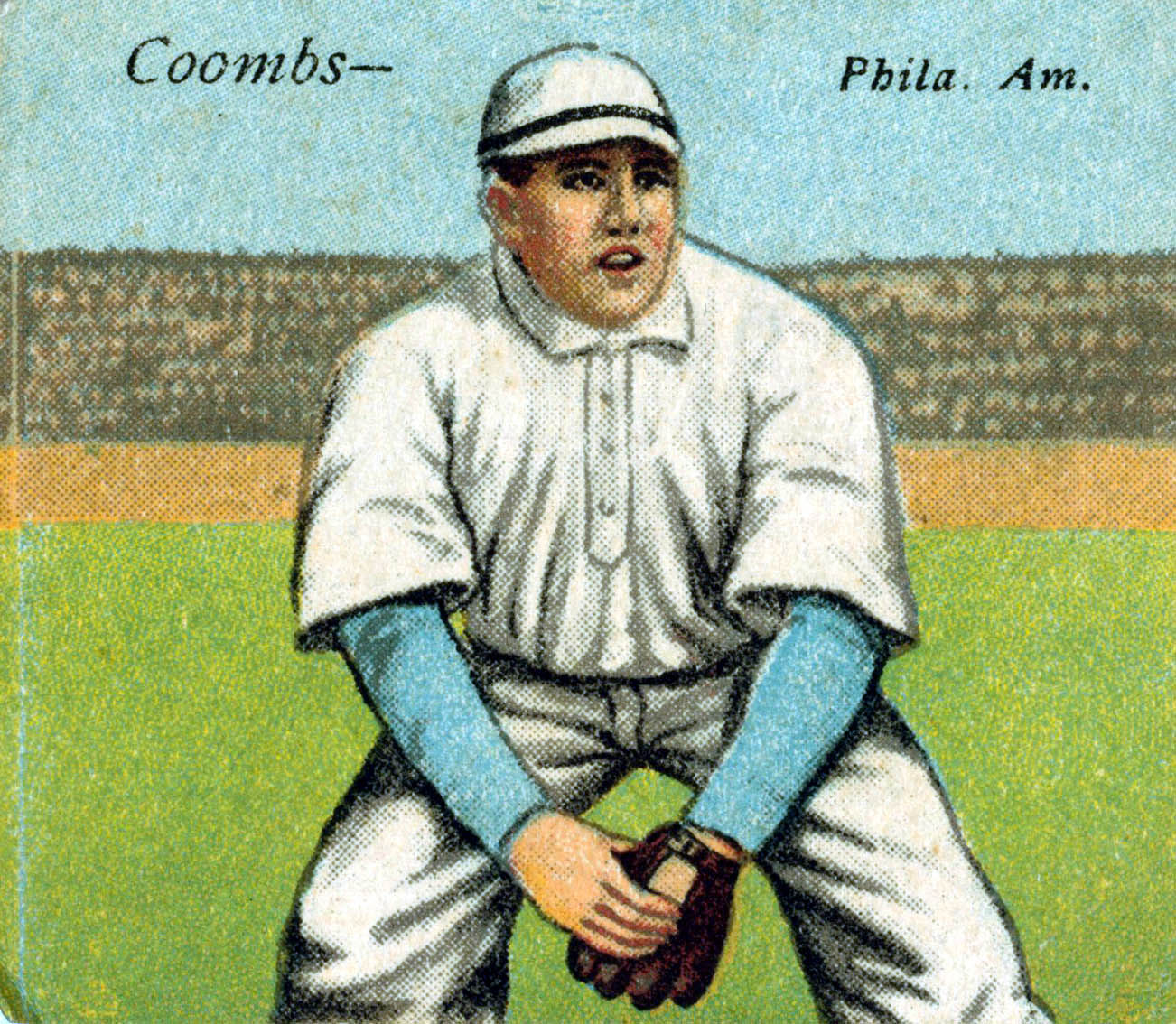
Jack Coombs pitched an American League record 13 shutouts for the Philadelphia Athletics in 1910, although he only pitched 35 shutouts total in his 14-season career.

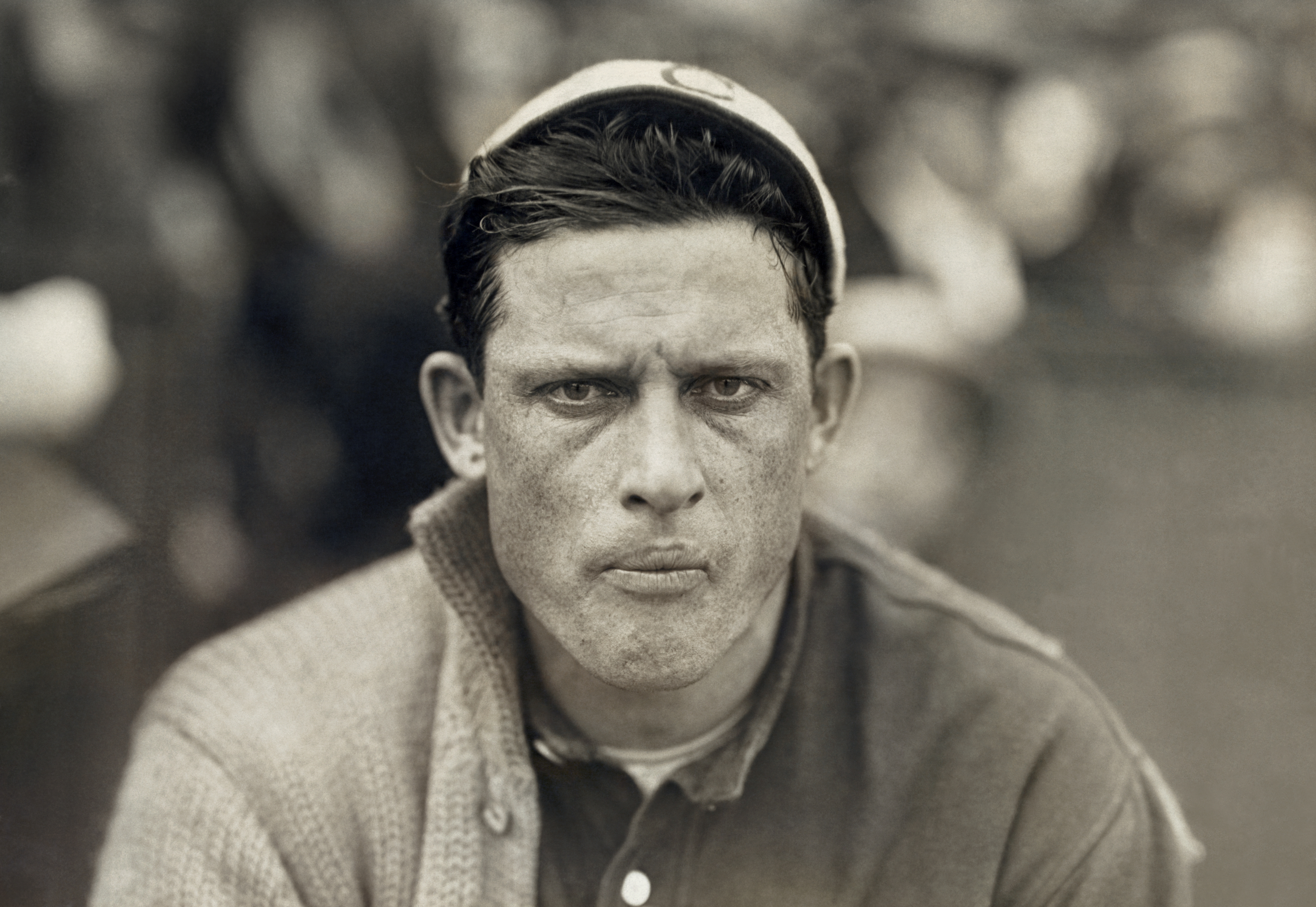
Ed Walsh, who holds a career record 1.82 ERA, is the only American League pitcher to record 10 or more shutouts on two occasions.

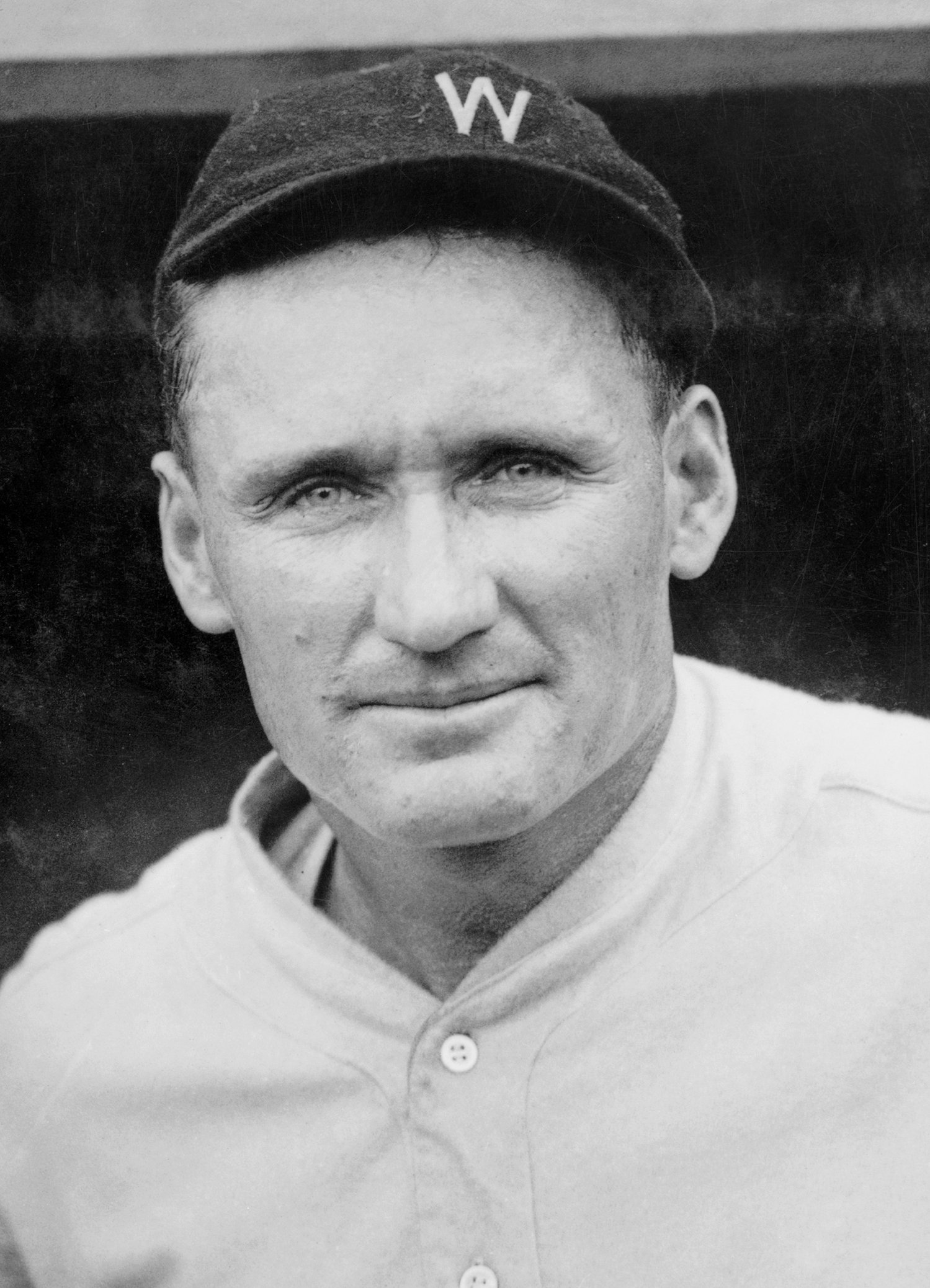
Walter Johnson tied or led the American League a record seven times in shutouts. He holds the all-time MLB record with 110 career shutouts.

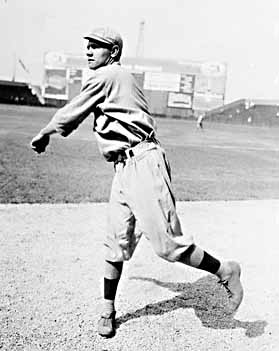
During his early pitching days, Babe Ruth, who is most known for his hitting prowess, led the American League with nine shutouts for the Boston Red Sox in 1916.

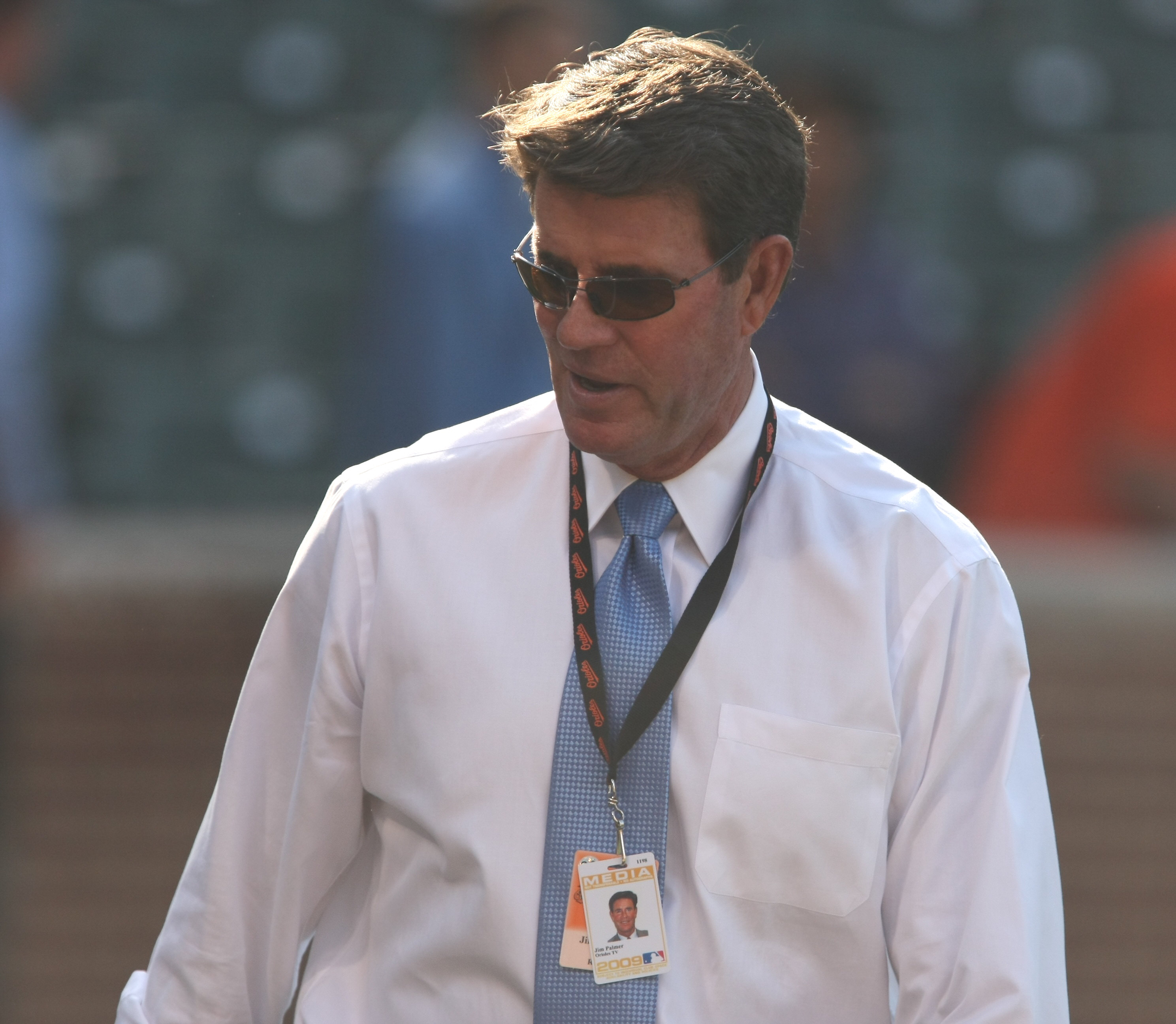
Jim Palmer was the last American League pitcher to record 10 shutouts in one season when he did so for the Baltimore Orioles in 1975.

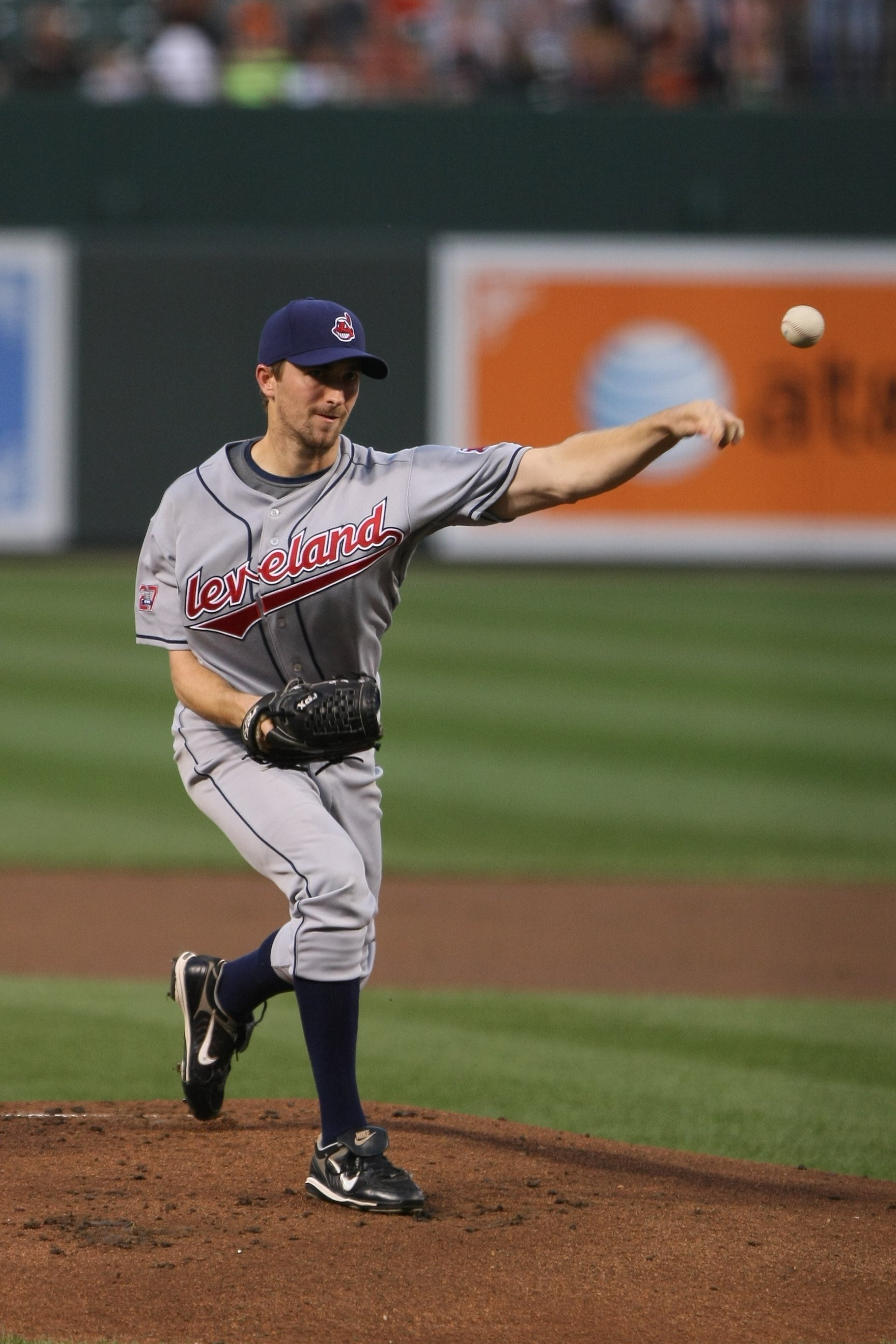
Jeremy Sowers for the Cleveland Indians in 2006 became the second American League pitcher (after Hod Lisenbee in 1927) to lead the league in shutouts in their rookie season.

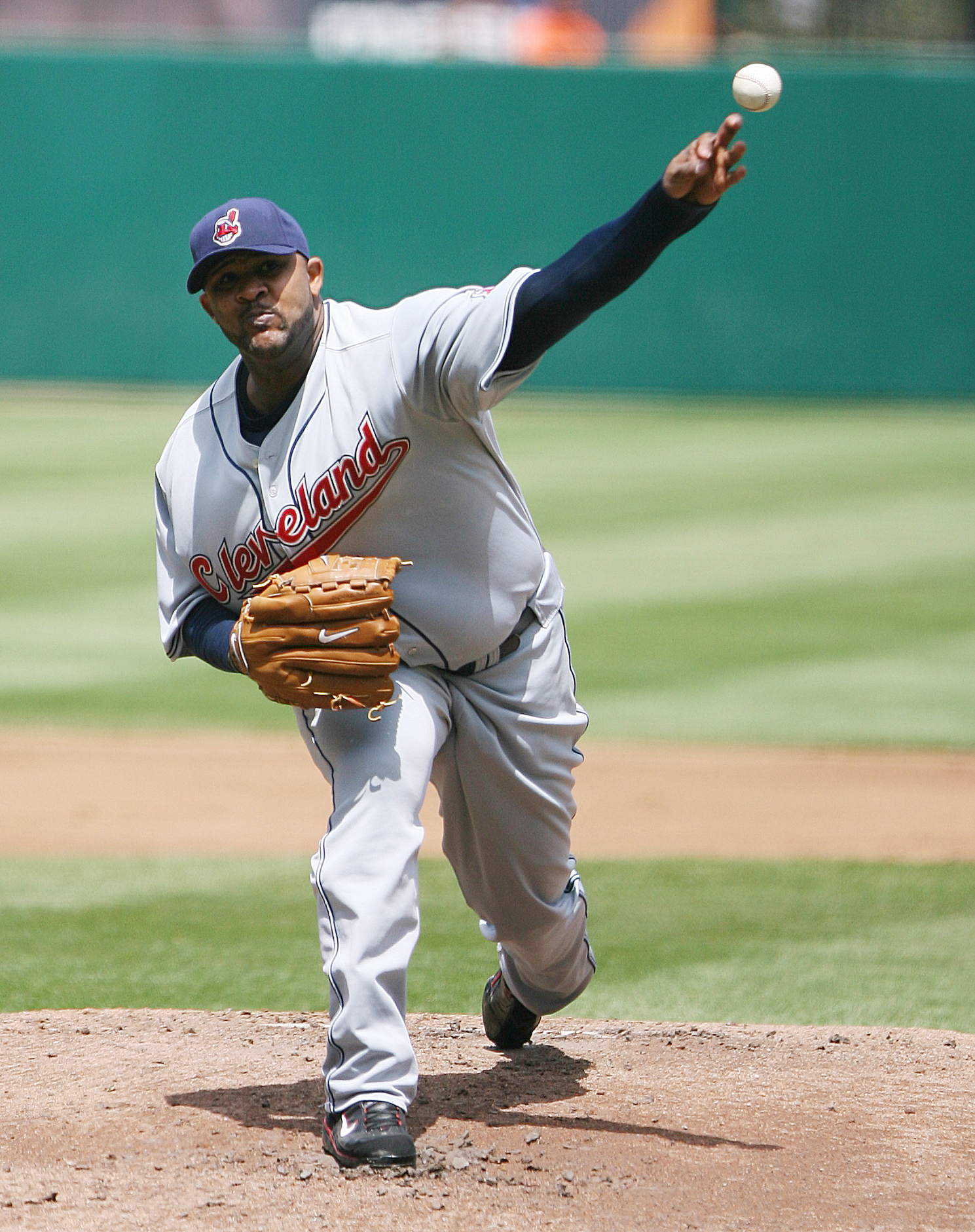
CC Sabathia is the only player to have led both leagues in shutouts in the same year (2008). He had two shutouts for the Cleveland Indians and led the American League when he was traded in the middle of the season to the Milwaukee Brewers of the National League and accumulated three more shutouts to lead that league as well.

* – Denotes a member of the Baseball Hall of Fame.
^{‡} – Denotes a pitcher that led the league in shutouts in their rookie year.

Year	Player(s)	Team(s)	Shutouts
1901	Clark Griffith*; Cy Young*	Chicago White Sox; Boston Americans	5
1902	Addie Joss*	Cleveland Bronchos	5
1903	Cy Young*	Boston Americans	7
1904	Cy Young*	Boston Americans	10
1905	Ed Killian	Detroit Tigers	8
1906	Ed Walsh*	Chicago White Sox	10
1907	Eddie Plank*	Philadelphia Athletics	10
1908	Ed Walsh*	Chicago White Sox	11
1909	Ed Walsh*	Chicago White Sox	8
1910	Jack Coombs	Philadelphia Athletics	13
1911	Eddie Plank*; Walter Johnson*	Philadelphia Athletics; Washington Senators	6
1912	Smoky Joe Wood	Boston Red Sox	10
1913	Walter Johnson*	Washington Senators	11
1914	Walter Johnson*	Washington Senators	9
1915	Jim Scott; Walter Johnson*	Chicago White Sox; Washington Senators	7
1916	Babe Ruth*	Boston Red Sox	9
1917	Stan Coveleski*	Cleveland Indians	9
1918	Carl Mays; Walter Johnson*	Boston Red Sox; Washington Senators	8
1919	Walter Johnson*	Washington Senators	7
1920	Carl Mays	New York Yankees	6
1921	Sad Sam Jones	Boston Red Sox	5
1922	George Uhle	Cleveland Indians	5
1923	Stan Coveleski*	Cleveland Indians	5
1924	Walter Johnson*	Washington Senators	6
1925	Ted Lyons*	Chicago White Sox	5
1926	Ed Wells	Detroit Tigers	4
1927	Hod Lisenbee^{‡}	Washington Senators	4
1928	Herb Pennock*	New York Yankees	5
1929	George Blaeholder; General Crowder; Sam Gray; Danny MacFayden	St. Louis Browns; St. Louis Browns; St. Louis Browns; Boston Red Sox	4
1930	Clint Brown; George Earnshaw; George Pipgras	Cleveland Indians; Philadelphia Athletics; New York Yankees	3
1931	Lefty Grove*	Philadelphia Athletics	4
1932	Lefty Grove*; Tommy Bridges	Philadelphia Athletics; Detroit Tigers	4
1933	Oral Hildebrand	Cleveland Indians	6
1934	Lefty Gomez*; Mel Harder	New York Yankees; Cleveland Indians	6
1935	Schoolboy Rowe	Detroit Tigers	6
1936	Lefty Grove*	Boston Red Sox	6
1937	Lefty Gomez*	New York Yankees	6
1938	Lefty Gomez*	New York Yankees	4
1939	Red Ruffing*	New York Yankees	5
1940	Al Milnar; Bob Feller*; Ted Lyons*	Cleveland Indians; Cleveland Indians; Chicago White Sox	4
1941	Bob Feller*	Cleveland Indians	6
1942	Tiny Bonham	New York Yankees	6
1943	Dizzy Trout; Spud Chandler	Detroit Tigers; New York Yankees	5
1944	Dizzy Trout	Detroit Tigers	7
1945	Hal Newhouser*	Detroit Tigers	8
1946	Bob Feller*	Cleveland Indians	10
1947	Bob Feller*	Cleveland Indians	5
1948	Bob Lemon	Cleveland Indians	10
1949	Ellis Kinder; Virgil Trucks	Boston Red Sox; Detroit Tigers	6
1950	Art Houtteman	Detroit Tigers	4
1951	Allie Reynolds	New York Yankees	7
1952	Allie Reynolds; Mike Garcia	New York Yankees; Cleveland Indians	6
1953	Bob Porterfield	Washington Senators	9
1954	Mike Garcia; Virgil Trucks	Cleveland Indians; Chicago White Sox	5
1955	Billy Hoeft	Detroit Tigers	7
1956	Herb Score	Cleveland Indians	5
1957	Jim Wilson	Chicago White Sox	5
1958	Whitey Ford*	New York Yankees	7
1959	Camilo Pascual	Washington Senators	6
1960	Early Wynn*; Jim Perry; Whitey Ford*	Chicago White Sox; Cleveland Indians; New York Yankees	4
1961	Camilo Pascual; Steve Barber	Minnesota Twins; Baltimore Orioles	8
1962	Camilo Pascual; Dick Donovan; Jim Kaat*	Minnesota Twins; Cleveland Indians; Minnesota Twins	5
1963	Ray Herbert	Chicago White Sox	7
1964	Dean Chance	Los Angeles Angels	11
1965	Mudcat Grant	Minnesota Twins	6
1966	Luis Tiant; Sam McDowell; Tommy John	Cleveland Indians; Cleveland Indians; Chicago White Sox	5
1967	Jim McGlothlin; Joe Horlen; Mickey Lolich; Steve Hargan; Tommy John	California Angels; Chicago White Sox; Detroit Tigers; Cleveland Indians; Chicago White Sox	6
1968	Luis Tiant	Cleveland Indians	9
1969	Denny McLain	Detroit Tigers	9
1970	Chuck Dobson; Jim Palmer*	Oakland Athletics; Baltimore Orioles	5
1971	Vida Blue	Oakland Athletics	8
1972	Nolan Ryan*	California Angels	9
1973	Bert Blyleven*	Minnesota Twins	9
1974	Luis Tiant	Boston Red Sox	7
1975	Jim Palmer*	Baltimore Orioles	10
1976	Nolan Ryan*	California Angels	7
1977	Frank Tanana	California Angels	7
1978	Ron Guidry	New York Yankees	9
1979	Dennis Leonard; Mike Flanagan; Nolan Ryan*	Kansas City Royals; Baltimore Orioles; California Angels	5
1980	Tommy John	New York Yankees	6
1981	Doc Medich; Ken Forsch; Richard Dotson; Steve McCatty	Texas Rangers; California Angels; Chicago White Sox; Oakland Athletics	4
1982	Dave Stieb	Toronto Blue Jays	5
1983	Mike Boddicker	Baltimore Orioles	5
1984	Bob Ojeda; Geoff Zahn	Boston Red Sox; California Angels	5
1985	Bert Blyleven	Cleveland Indians and Minnesota Twins	5
1986	Jack Morris*	Detroit Tigers	6
1987	Roger Clemens	Boston Red Sox	7
1988	Roger Clemens	Boston Red Sox	8
1989	Bert Blyleven*	California Angels	5
1990	Dave Stewart; Roger Clemens	Oakland Athletics; Boston Red Sox	4
1991	Roger Clemens	Boston Red Sox	5
1992	Roger Clemens	Boston Red Sox	5
1993	Jack McDowell	Chicago White Sox	4
1994	Randy Johnson*	Seattle Mariners	4
1995	Mike Mussina*	Baltimore Orioles	4
1996	Ken Hill; Pat Hentgen; Rich Robertson	Texas Rangers; Toronto Blue Jays; Minnesota Twins	3
1997	Pat Hentgen; Roger Clemens	Toronto Blue Jays; Toronto Blue Jays	3
1998	David Wells	New York Yankees	5
1999	Scott Erickson	Baltimore Orioles	3
2000	Pedro Martínez*	Boston Red Sox	4
2001	Mark Mulder	Oakland Athletics	4
2002	Jeff Weaver	Detroit Tigers; New York Yankees	3
2003	Joel Piñeiro; John Lackey; Mark Mulder; Roy Halladay*; Tim Hudson	Seattle Mariners; Anaheim Angels; Oakland Athletics; Toronto Blue Jays; Oakland Athletics	2
2004	Jeremy Bonderman; Sidney Ponson; Tim Hudson	Detroit Tigers; Baltimore Orioles; Oakland Athletics	2
2005	Jon Garland	Chicago White Sox	3
2006	CC Sabathia*; Jake Westbrook; Jeremy Sowers^{‡} John Lackey	Cleveland Indians; Cleveland Indians; Cleveland Indians; L.A. Angels of Anaheim	2
2007	Jeff Weaver; John Lackey; José Contreras; Paul Byrd	Seattle Mariners; L.A. Angels of Anaheim; Chicago White Sox; Cleveland Indians	2
2008	CC Sabathia*; Cliff Lee; James Shields; Jesse Litsch; Jon Lester; Kevin Slowey; Matt Garza; Roy Halladay*	Cleveland Indians; Cleveland Indians; Tampa Bay Rays; Toronto Blue Jays; Boston Red Sox; Minnesota Twins; Tampa Bay Rays; Toronto Blue Jays	2
2009	Roy Halladay*	Toronto Blue Jays	4
2010	Carl Pavano; Dallas Braden	Minnesota Twins; Oakland Athletics	2
2011	James Shields; Derek Holland	Tampa Bay Rays; Texas Rangers	4
2012	Félix Hernández	Seattle Mariners	5
2013	Bartolo Colón; Justin Masterson	Oakland Athletics; Cleveland Indians	3
2014	Rick Porcello	Detroit Tigers	3
2015	Sonny Gray; Félix Hernández; Dallas Keuchel; Mike Montgomery; Jeff Samardzija	Oakland Athletics; Seattle Mariners; Houston Astros; Seattle Mariners; Chicago White Sox	2
2016	Corey Kluber	Cleveland Indians	2
2017	Corey Kluber; Ervin Santana	Cleveland Indians; Minnesota Twins	3
2018	José Berríos; Mike Clevinger; Gerrit Cole; Andrew Heaney; Corey Kluber; Sean Manaea; Daniel Mengden; James Paxton; Luis Severino; Masahiro Tanaka; Justin Verlander	Minnesota Twins; Cleveland Indians; Houston Astros; Los Angeles Angels; Cleveland Indians; Oakland Athletics; Oakland Athletics; Seattle Mariners; New York Yankees; New York Yankees; Houston Astros	1
2019	Shane Bieber; Lucas Giolito	Cleveland Indians; Chicago White Sox	2
2020	Gerrit Cole; Kyle Gibson; Lucas Giolito; Brad Keller; Mike Minor	New York Yankees; Texas Rangers; Chicago White Sox; Kansas City Royals; Texas Rangers/Oakland Athletics	1
2021	Sean Manaea	Oakland Athletics	2
2022	Dylan Cease; Nestor Cortés Jr. Reid Detmers‡ Nathan Eovaldi; Dean Kremer; Martín Pérez; Patrick Sandoval; Framber Valdez; Michael Wacha	Chicago White Sox; New York Yankees; Los Angeles Angels; Boston Red Sox; Baltimore Orioles; Texas Rangers; Los Angeles Angels; Houston Astros; Boston Red Sox	1
2023	Gerrit Cole; Framber Valdez	New York Yankees; Houston Astros	2
2024	Ronel Blanco; Joey Estes‡ Kevin Gausman; Tanner Houck; Keider Montero‡	Houston Astros; Oakland Athletics; Toronto Blue Jays; Boston Red Sox; Detroit Tigers	1
2025	Tanner Bibee; Garrett Crochet; Nathan Eovaldi; Kevin Gausman; Stephen Kolek; Tarik Skubal	Cleveland Guardians; Boston Red Sox; Texas Rangers; Toronto Blue Jays; Kansas City Royals; Detroit Tigers	1
2026	Noah Cameron; Dylan Cease; Stephen Kolek; Bailey Ober	Kansas City Royals; Toronto Blue Jays; Kansas City Royals; Minnesota Twins	1

== National League ==
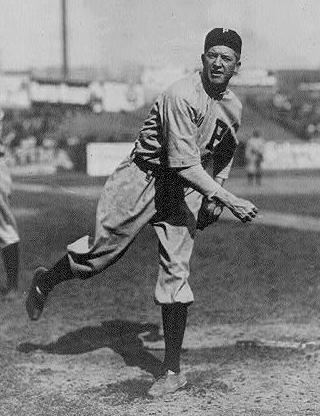
Pete Alexander led the National League in shutouts seven times, including a record-tying 16 in 1916. He is the only National League pitcher to lead the league with 10 or more on two occasions.

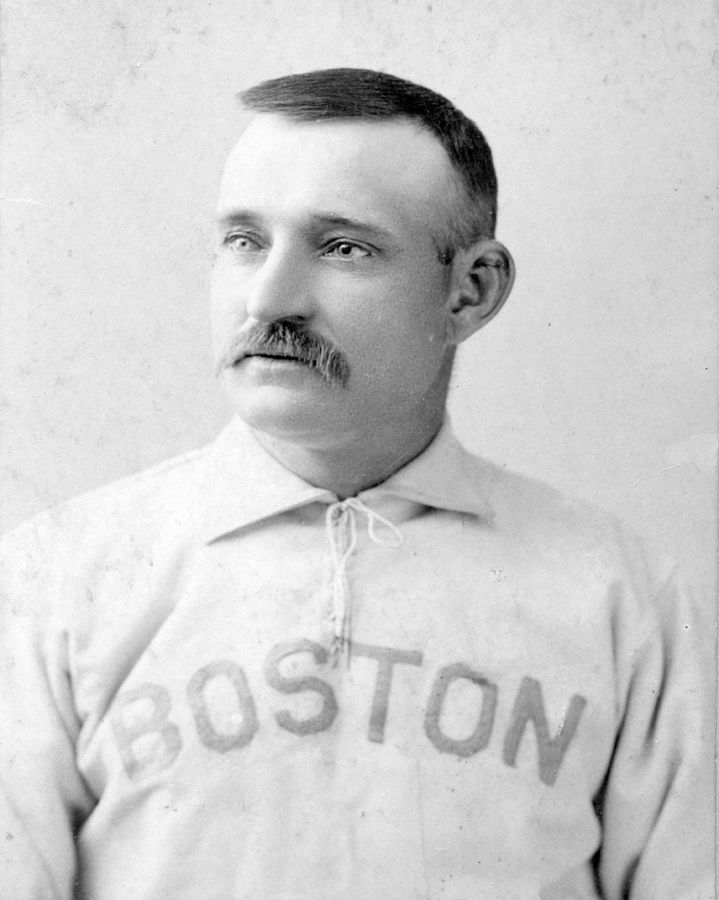
Old Hoss Radbourn's 11 shutouts in 1884 is the highest number of shutouts to not have led the league. Pud Galvin led the league with 12 shutouts.

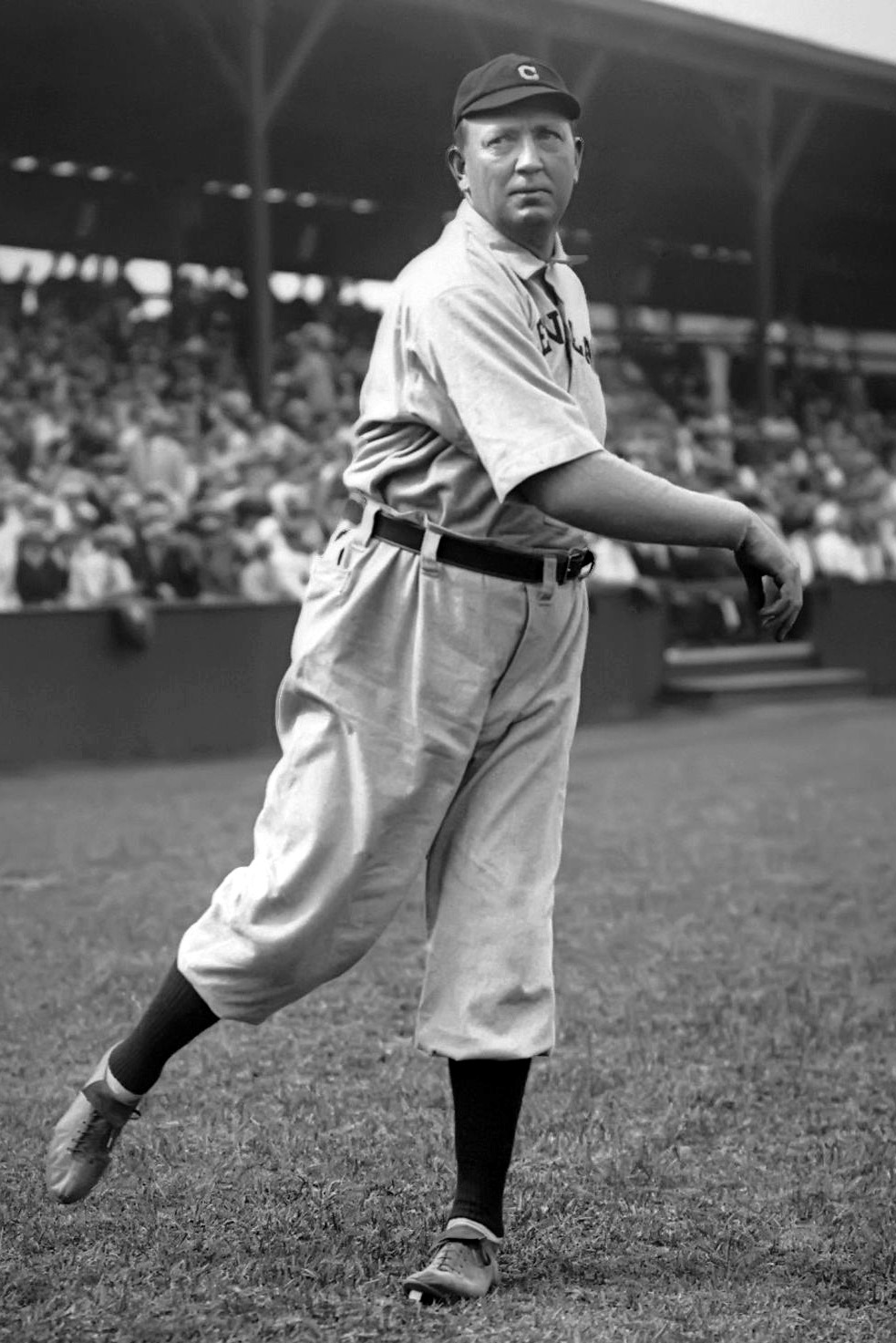
Cy Young led the National League four times and the American League three times in shutouts. His career total of 76 is ranked fourth all time.

Hall of Famer Sandy Koufax, led the NL three times

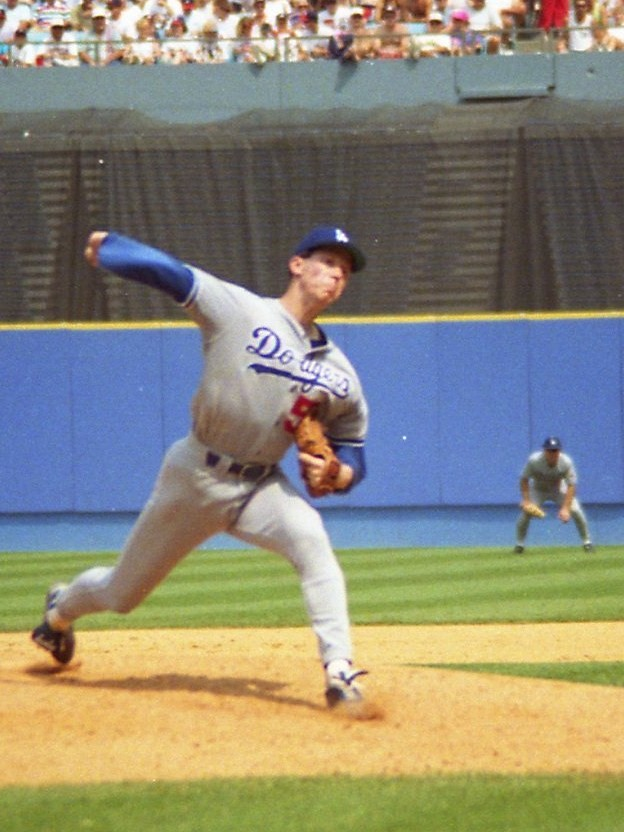
Orel Hershiser's league leading eight shutouts in 1988 for the Los Angeles Dodgers included a Major League record 59 consecutive innings pitched without allowing a run.

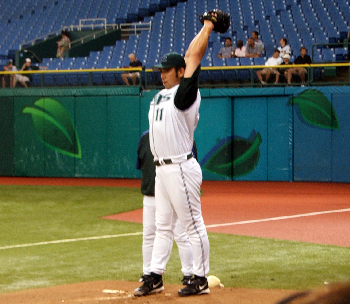
Hideo Nomo became the first Asian pitcher to lead the league in shutouts with three on the Los Angeles Dodgers in his rookie season of 1995.

* – Denotes a member of the Baseball Hall of Fame.
^{‡} – Denotes a pitcher that led the league in shutouts in their rookie year.

Year	Player(s)	Team(s)	Shutouts
1876	George Bradley	St. Louis Brown Stockings	16
1877	Tommy Bond	Boston Red Caps	6
1878	Tommy Bond	Boston Red Caps	9
1879	Tommy Bond	Boston Red Caps	11
1880	Monte Ward*	Providence Grays	8
1881	George Derby^{‡}	Detroit Wolverines	9
1882	Old Hoss Radbourn*	Providence Grays	6
1883	Pud Galvin*	Buffalo Bisons	5
1884	Pud Galvin*	Buffalo Bisons	12
1885	John Clarkson*	Chicago White Stockings	10
1886	Lady Baldwin	Detroit Wolverines	7
1887	Dan Casey	Philadelphia Quakers	4
1888	Ben Sanders^{‡} Tim Keefe*	Philadelphia Quakers; New York Giants	8
1889	John Clarkson*	Boston Beaneaters	8
1890	Kid Nichols^{‡}*	Boston Beaneaters	7
1891	Amos Rusie*	New York Giants	6
1892	Cy Young*	Cleveland Spiders	9
1893	Amos Rusie*; Red Ehret	New York Giants; Pittsburgh Pirates	4
1894	Amos Rusie*; Kid Nichols*; George Cuppy	New York Giants; Boston Beaneaters; Cleveland Spiders	3
1895	Amos Rusie*; Bill Hoffer^{‡} Cy Young*; Pink Hawley; Sadie McMahon	New York Giants; Baltimore Orioles; Cleveland Spiders; Pittsburgh Pirates; Baltimore Orioles	4
1896	Cy Young*; Frank Killen	Cleveland Spiders; Pittsburgh Pirates	5
1897	Doc McJames; Win Mercer	Washington Senators; Washington Senators	3
1898	Jack Powell; Wiley Piatt^{‡}	Cleveland Spiders; Philadelphia Phillies	6
1899	Vic Willis	Boston Beaneaters	5
1900	Clark Griffith*; Cy Young*; Kid Nichols*; Noodles Hahn	Chicago Orphans; St. Louis Perfectos; Boston Beaneaters; Cincinnati Reds	4
1901	Al Orth; Jack Chesbro*; Vic Willis*	Philadelphia Phillies; Pittsburgh Pirates; Boston Beaneaters	6
1902	Christy Mathewson*; Jack Chesbro*; Jack Taylor	New York Giants; Pittsburgh Pirates; Chicago Cubs	8
1903	Sam Leever	Pittsburgh Pirates	7
1904	Joe McGinnity*	New York Giants	9
1905	Christy Mathewson*	New York Giants	8
1906	Mordecai Brown*	Chicago Cubs	9
1907	Christy Mathewson*; Orval Overall	New York Giants; Chicago Cubs	8
1908	Christy Mathewson*	New York Giants	11
1909	Orval Overall	Chicago Cubs	9
1910	Al Mattern; Earl Moore; Mordecai Brown*; Nap Rucker	Boston Braves; Philadelphia Phillies; Chicago Cubs; Brooklyn Superbas	6
1911	Pete Alexander*	Philadelphia Phillies	7
1912	Marty O'Toole; Nap Rucker	Pittsburgh Pirates; Brooklyn Trolley Dodgers	6
1913	Pete Alexander*	Philadelphia Phillies	9
1914	Jeff Tesreau	New York Giants	8
1915	Pete Alexander*	Philadelphia Phillies	12
1916	Pete Alexander*	Philadelphia Phillies	16
1917	Pete Alexander*	Philadelphia Phillies	8
1918	Hippo Vaughn	Chicago Cubs	8
1919	Pete Alexander*	Chicago Cubs	9
1920	Babe Adams	Pittsburgh Pirates	8
1921	Clarence Mitchell; Dana Fillingim; Dolf Luque; Jesse Haines*; Joe Oeschger; Johnny Morrison; Pete Alexander*; Phil Douglas	Brooklyn Robins; Boston Braves; Cincinnati Reds; St. Louis Cardinals; Boston Braves; Pittsburgh Pirates; Chicago Cubs; New York Giants	3
1922	Dazzy Vance*; Johnny Morrison	Brooklyn Robins; Pittsburgh Pirates	5
1923	Dolf Luque	Cincinnati Reds	6
1924	Allen Sothoron; Emil Yde^{‡} Eppa Rixey*; Jesse Barnes; Ray Kremer^{‡} Wilbur Cooper	St. Louis Cardinals; Pittsburgh Pirates; Cincinnati Reds; Boston Braves; Pittsburgh Pirates; Pittsburgh Pirates	4
1925	Dazzy Vance*; Dolf Luque; Hal Carlson	Brooklyn Robins; Cincinnati Reds; Philadelphia Phillies	4
1926	Pete Donohue	Cincinnati Reds	5
1927	Jesse Haines*	St. Louis Cardinals	6
1928	Burleigh Grimes*; Dazzy Vance*; Doug McWeeny; Red Lucas; Sheriff Blake	Pittsburgh Pirates; Brooklyn Robins; Brooklyn Robins; Cincinnati Reds; Chicago Cubs	4
1929	Pat Malone	Chicago Cubs	5
1930	Charlie Root; Dazzy Vance*	Chicago Cubs; Brooklyn Robins	4
1931	Bill Walker	New York Giants	6
1932	Dizzy Dean*; Lon Warneke; Steve Swetonic	St. Louis Cardinals; Chicago Cubs; Pittsburgh Pirates	4
1933	Carl Hubbell*	New York Giants	10
1934	Dizzy Dean*	St. Louis Cardinals	7
1935	Cy Blanton; Freddie Fitzsimmons; Big Jim Weaver; Larry French; Van Lingle Mungo	Pittsburgh Pirates; New York Giants; Pittsburgh Pirates; Chicago Cubs; Brooklyn Dodgers	4
1936	Al Smith; Bill Lee; Bucky Walters; Cy Blanton; Larry French; Lon Warneke; Tex Carleton	New York Giants; Chicago Cubs; Philadelphia Phillies; Pittsburgh Pirates; Chicago Cubs; Chicago Cubs; Chicago Cubs	4
1937	Jim Turner^{‡} Lee Grissom; Lou Fette^{‡}	Boston Bees; Cincinnati Reds; Boston Bees	5
1938	Bill Lee	Chicago Cubs	9
1939	Lou Fette	Boston Bees	6
1940	Manny Salvo; Whit Wyatt	Boston Bees; Brooklyn Dodgers	5
1941	Whit Wyatt	Brooklyn Dodgers	7
1942	Mort Cooper	St. Louis Cardinals	10
1943	Hiram Bithorn	Chicago Cubs	7
1944	Mort Cooper	St. Louis Cardinals	7
1945	Claude Passeau	Chicago Cubs	5
1946	Ewell Blackwell; Harry Brecheen	Cincinnati Reds; St. Louis Cardinals	5
1947	Warren Spahn*	Boston Braves	7
1948	Harry Brecheen	St. Louis Cardinals	7
1949	Don Newcombe^{‡} Howie Pollet; Ken Heintzelman; Ken Raffensberger	Brooklyn Dodgers; St. Louis Cardinals; Philadelphia Phillies; Cincinnati Reds	5
1950	Jim Hearn; Larry Jansen; Robin Roberts*; Sal Maglie	Cardinals / N.Y. Giants; New York Giants; Philadelphia Phillies; New York Giants	5
1951	Warren Spahn*	Boston Braves	7
1952	Curt Simmons; Ken Raffensberger	Philadelphia Phillies; Cincinnati Reds	6
1953	Harvey Haddix	St. Louis Cardinals	6
1954	Johnny Antonelli	New York Giants	6
1955	Joe Nuxhall	Cincinnati Redlegs	5
1956	Lew Burdette	Milwaukee Braves	6
1957	Johnny Podres	Brooklyn Dodgers	6
1958	Carl Willey^{‡}	Milwaukee Braves	4
1959	Bob Buhl; Don Drysdale*; Johnny Antonelli; Lew Burdette; Roger Craig; Sam Jones; Warren Spahn*	Milwaukee Braves; Los Angeles Dodgers; San Francisco Giants; Milwaukee Braves; Los Angeles Dodgers; San Francisco Giants; Milwaukee Braves	4
1960	Jack Sanford	San Francisco Giants	6
1961	Joey Jay; Warren Spahn*	Cincinnati Reds; Milwaukee Braves	4
1962	Bob Friend; Bob Gibson*	Pittsburgh Pirates; St. Louis Cardinals	5
1963	Sandy Koufax*	Los Angeles Dodgers	11
1964	Sandy Koufax*	Los Angeles Dodgers	7
1965	Juan Marichal*	San Francisco Giants	10
1966	Bob Gibson*; Jim Bunning*; Jim Maloney; Larry Jackson; Larry Jaster; Sandy Koufax*	St. Louis Cardinals; Philadelphia Phillies; Cincinnati Reds; Chicago Cubs / Phillies; St. Louis Cardinals; Los Angeles Dodgers	5
1967	Jim Bunning*	Philadelphia Phillies	6
1968	Bob Gibson*	St. Louis Cardinals	13
1969	Juan Marichal*	San Francisco Giants	8
1970	Gaylord Perry*	San Francisco Giants	5
1971	Al Downing; Bob Gibson*; Milt Pappas; Steve Blass	Los Angeles Dodgers; St. Louis Cardinals; Chicago Cubs; Pittsburgh Pirates	5
1972	Don Sutton*	Los Angeles Dodgers	9
1973	Jack Billingham	Cincinnati Reds	7
1974	Jon Matlack	New York Mets	7
1975	Andy Messersmith	Los Angeles Dodgers	7
1976	John Montefusco; Jon Matlack	San Francisco Giants; New York Mets	6
1977	Tom Seaver*	New York Mets / Reds	7
1978	Bob Knepper	San Francisco Giants	6
1979	Joe Niekro; Steve Rogers; Tom Seaver*	Houston Astros; Montreal Expos; Cincinnati Reds	5
1980	Jerry Reuss	Los Angeles Dodgers	6
1981	Fernando Valenzuela^{‡}	Los Angeles Dodgers	8
1982	Steve Carlton*	Philadelphia Phillies	6
1983	Steve Rogers	Montreal Expos	5
1984	Alejandro Peña; Joaquín Andújar; Orel Hershiser	Los Angeles Dodgers; St. Louis Cardinals; Los Angeles Dodgers	4
1985	John Tudor	St. Louis Cardinals	10
1986	Bob Knepper; Mike Scott	Houston Astros; Houston Astros	5
1987	Bob Welch; Rick Reuschel	Los Angeles Dodgers; Pittsburgh Pirates / Giants	4
1988	Orel Hershiser	Los Angeles Dodgers	8
1989	Tim Belcher	Los Angeles Dodgers	8
1990	Bruce Hurst; Mike Morgan	San Diego Padres; Los Angeles Dodgers	4
1991	Dennis Martínez	Montreal Expos	5
1992	David Cone; Tom Glavine*	New York Mets; Atlanta Braves	5
1993	Pete Harnisch	Houston Astros	4
1994	Greg Maddux*; Ramón Martínez	Atlanta Braves; Los Angeles Dodgers	3
1995	Greg Maddux*; Hideo Nomo^{‡}	Atlanta Braves; Los Angeles Dodgers	3
1996	Kevin Brown	Florida Marlins	3
1997	Carlos Pérez	Montreal Expos	5
1998	Greg Maddux*	Atlanta Braves	5
1999	Andy Ashby	San Diego Padres	3
2000	Greg Maddux*; Randy Johnson*	Atlanta Braves; Arizona Diamondbacks	3
2001	Greg Maddux*; Javier Vázquez	Atlanta Braves; Montreal Expos	3
2002	A. J. Burnett	Florida Marlins	5
2003	Jason Schmidt; Kevin Millwood; Matt Morris	San Francisco Giants; Philadelphia Phillies; St. Louis Cardinals	3
2004	Cory Lidle; Jason Schmidt	Cincinnati Reds / Phillies; San Francisco Giants	3
2005	Dontrelle Willis	Florida Marlins	5
2006	Brandon Webb; Chris Carpenter	Arizona Diamondbacks; St. Louis Cardinals	3
2007	Brandon Webb	Arizona Diamondbacks	3
2008	Ben Sheets; CC Sabathia*	Milwaukee Brewers; Milwaukee Brewers	3
2009	Bronson Arroyo; Cole Hamels; J. A. Happ; Joel Piñeiro; Tim Lincecum	Cincinnati Reds; Philadelphia Phillies; Philadelphia Phillies; St. Louis Cardinals; San Francisco Giants	2
2010	Roy Halladay*	Philadelphia Phillies	5
2011	Cliff Lee	Philadelphia Phillies	6
2012	R. A. Dickey	New York Mets	3
2013	Clayton Kershaw; Adam Wainwright; Jordan Zimmermann	Los Angeles Dodgers; St. Louis Cardinals; Washington Nationals	2
2014	Henderson Álvarez; Adam Wainwright	Miami Marlins; St. Louis Cardinals	3
2015	Jake Arrieta; Clayton Kershaw; Max Scherzer	Chicago Cubs; Los Angeles Dodgers; Washington Nationals	3
2016	Clayton Kershaw	Los Angeles Dodgers	3
2017	Carlos Martínez	St. Louis Cardinals	2
2018	Patrick Corbin; Mike Foltynewicz; Miles Mikolas; Chris Stratton; Noah Syndergaard; Jameson Taillon; Trevor Williams	Arizona Diamondbacks; Atlanta Braves; St. Louis Cardinals; San Francisco Giants; New York Mets; Pittsburgh Pirates; Pittsburgh Pirates	1
2019	Sandy Alcántara‡	Miami Marlins	2
2020	Trevor Bauer	Cincinnati Reds	2
2021	Anthony DeSclafani; Max Fried; Joe Musgrove; Zack Wheeler	San Francisco Giants; Atlanta Braves; San Diego Padres; Philadelphia Phillies	2
2022	Sandy Alcántara; Walker Buehler; Bryce Elder‡ Hunter Greene‡ Chad Kuhl; Jordan Montgomery; Aaron Nola	Miami Marlins; Los Angeles Dodgers; Atlanta Braves; Cincinnati Reds; Colorado Rockies; St. Louis Cardinals; Philadelphia Phillies	1
2023	Sandy Alcántara; Alex Cobb; Max Fried; Zac Gallen; Mitch Keller; Michael Lorenzen; Johan Oviedo; Marcus Stroman; Logan Webb; Brandon Woodruff	Miami Marlins; San Francisco Giants; Atlanta Braves; Arizona Diamondbacks; Pittsburgh Pirates; Philadelphia Phillies; Pittsburgh Pirates; Chicago Cubs; San Francisco Giants; Milwaukee Brewers	1
2024	Dylan Cease; Max Fried; Braxton Garrett; Aaron Nola; Tyler Phillips‡ Cristopher Sánchez; Luis Severino; Blake Snell; Gavin Stone‡ Ranger Suárez; Logan Webb	San Diego Padres; Atlanta Braves; Miami Marlins; Philadelphia Phillies; Philadelphia Phillies; Philadelphia Phillies; New York Mets; San Francisco Giants; Los Angeles Dodgers; Philadelphia Phillies; San Francisco Giants	1
2025	Andrew Abbott; Erick Fedde; Sonny Gray; Hunter Greene; Michael King; Nick Lodolo; David Peterson	Cincinnati Reds; St. Louis Cardinals; St. Louis Cardinals; Cincinnati Reds; San Diego Padres; Cincinnati Reds; New York Mets	1
2026	Sandy Alcántara; Jesús Luzardo; Dustin May; Jacob Misiorowski; Eury Pérez; Chris Sale; Cristopher Sánchez	Miami Marlins; Philadelphia Phillies; Milwaukee Brewers; Milwaukee Brewers; Miami Marlins; Atlanta Braves; Philadelphia Phillies	1

== American Association ==
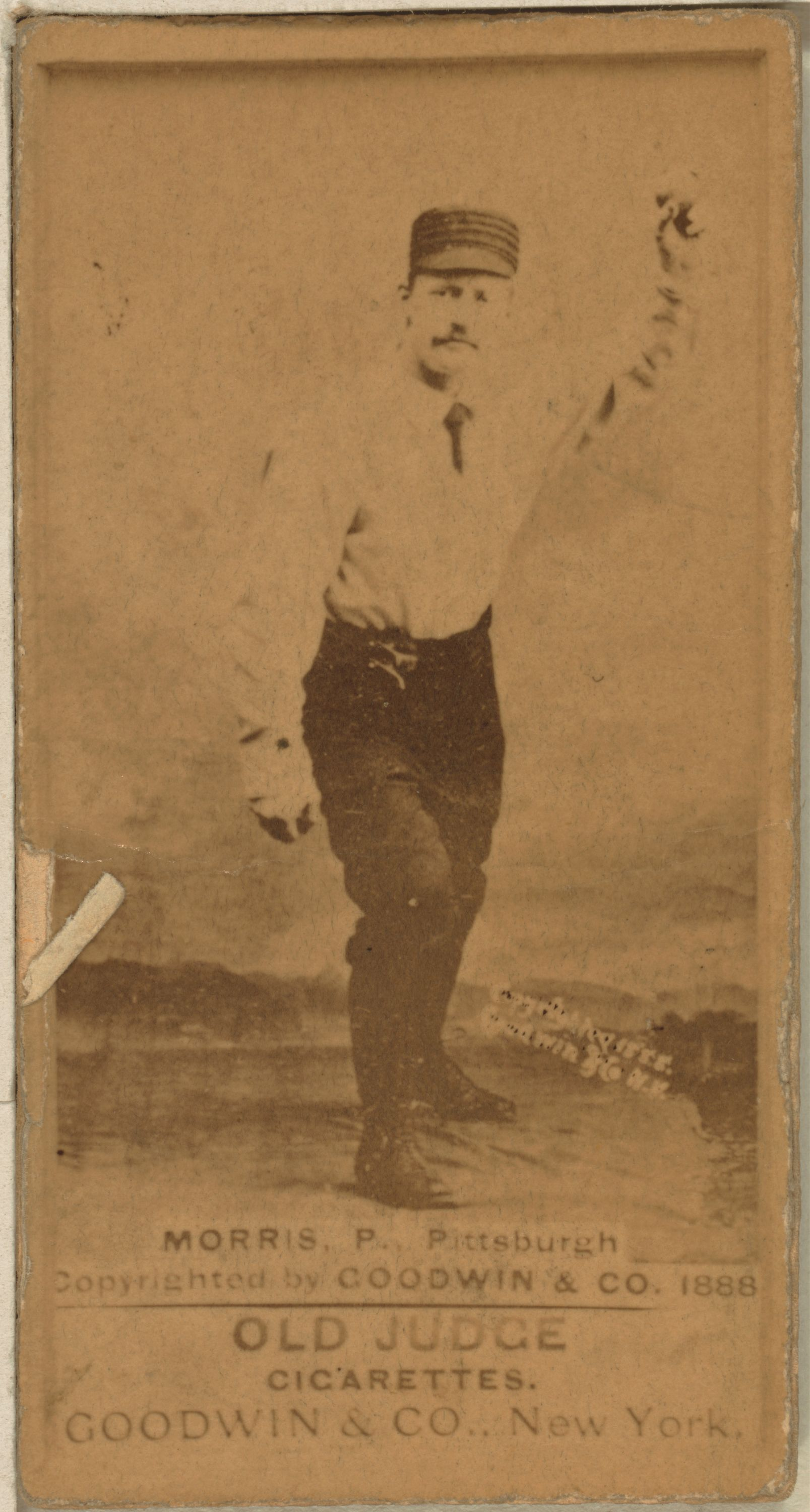
Ed Morris set the American Association record with 12 shutouts in 1886.

Year	Player(s)	Team(s)	Shutouts
1882	Will White	Cincinnati Red Stockings	8
1883	Jumbo McGinnis; Will White	St. Louis Brown Stockings; Cincinnati Red Stockings	6
1884	Tony Mullane; Will White	Toledo Blue Stockings; Cincinnati Red Stockings	7
1885	Ed Morris	Pittsburgh Alleghenys	7
1886	Ed Morris	Pittsburgh Alleghenys	12
1887	Matt Kilroy; Tony Mullane	Baltimore Orioles; Cincinnati Red Stockings	6
1888	Ed Seward; Silver King	Philadelphia Athletics; St. Louis Browns	6
1889	Bob Caruthers	Brooklyn Bridegrooms	7
1890	Elton Chamberlain	St. Louis Browns; Columbus Solons	6
1891	George Haddock; Phil Knell; Sadie McMahon	Boston Reds; Columbus Solons; Baltimore Orioles	5

== Federal League ==
Year	Player(s)	Team(s)	Shutouts
1914	Cy Falkenberg	Indianapolis Hoosiers	9
1915	Dave Davenport	St. Louis Terriers	10

== Players' League ==
Year	Player(s)	Team(s)	Shutouts
1890	Silver King	Chicago Pirates	4

== Union Association ==
Year	Player(s)	Team(s)	Shutouts
1884	Jim McCormick	Cincinnati Outlaw Reds	7

== National Association ==
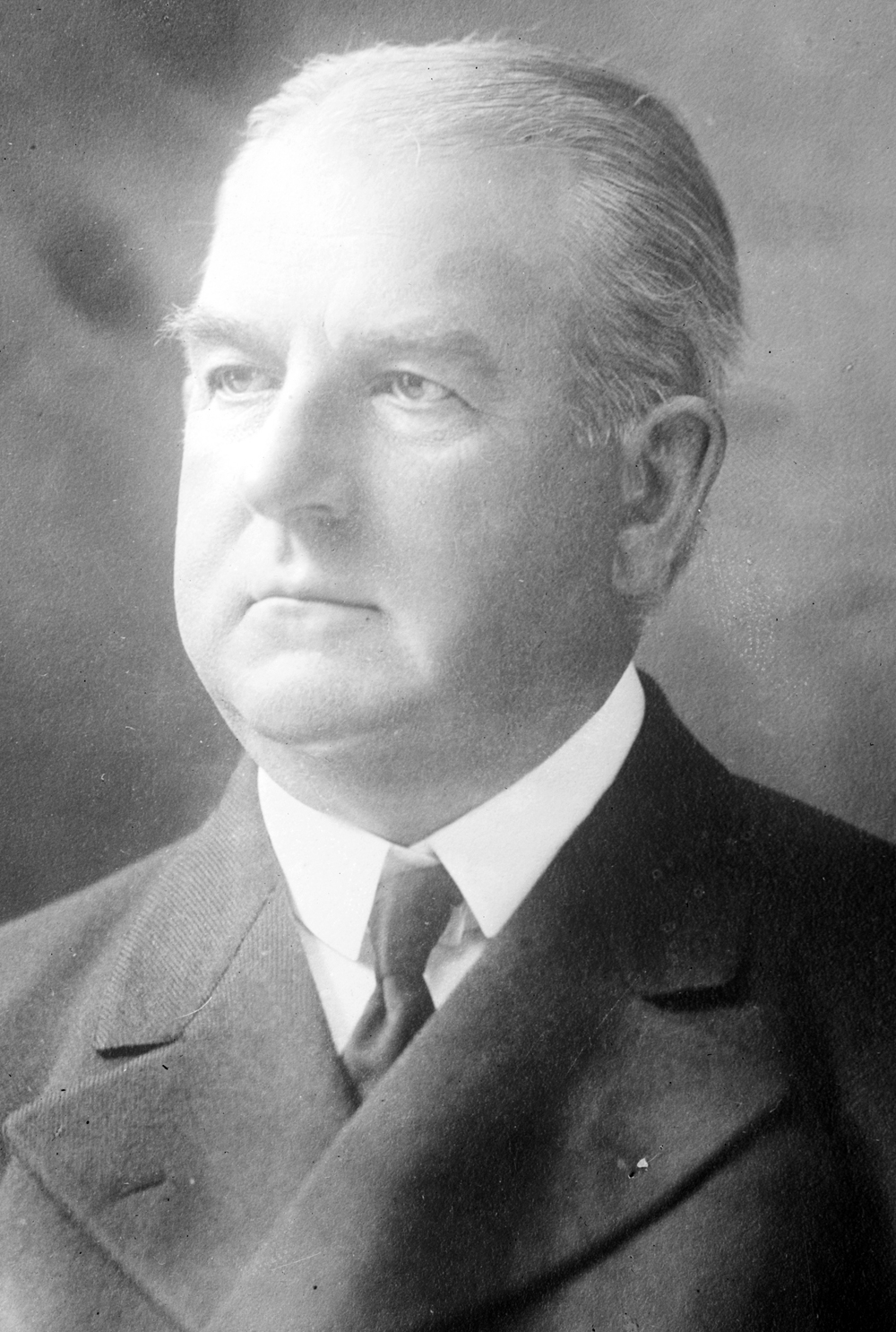
Albert Spalding of the Boston Red Stockings tied the National Association leaders in shutouts during four of the league's five seasons.

* – Denotes a member of the Baseball Hall of Fame.
^{‡} – Denotes a pitcher that led the league in shutouts in their rookie year.

Year	Player(s)	Team(s)	Shutouts
1871	Albert Spalding^{‡}* Bobby Mathews^{‡} Cherokee Fisher^{‡} Rynie Wolters^{‡}	Boston Red Stockings; Fort Wayne Kekiongas; Rockford Forest Citys; New York Mutuals	1
1872	Albert Spalding*; Candy Cummings^{‡}*	Boston Red Stockings; New York Mutuals	3
1873	Dick McBride	Philadelphia Athletics	3
1874	Albert Spalding*; Bobby Mathews	Boston Red Stockings; New York Mutuals	4
1875	Albert Spalding*; Candy Cummings*; George Zettlein	Boston Red Stockings; Hartford Dark Blues; Chicago / Philadelphia	7
