= Bill Lennon =

American baseball player (1845–1910)

William H. Lennon
- Catcher
- Born: January 3, 1845; Brooklyn, New York, U.S.
- Died: August 19, 1910 (aged 65); Philadelphia, Pennsylvania, U.S.
- Batted: Unknown Threw: Unknown

MLB debut
- May 4, 1871, for the Fort Wayne Kekiongas

Last MLB appearance
- July 11, 1873, for the Baltimore Marylands

Career statistics
- Batting average: .215
- Home runs: 0
- Runs batted in: 13
- Managerial record: 5–9
- Winning %: .357
- Stats at Baseball Reference
- Managerial record at Baseball Reference

Teams
- Americus of Brooklyn (1863); Stars of Brooklyn (1863–1864); Enterprise of Brooklyn (1865); Franklin Junior of Brooklyn (1866–1867); Excelsior of Brooklyn (1867); Mohawks of Brooklyn (1868); Harmonics of Brooklyn (1868); Excelsiors of Chicago (1868); Marylands (1869–1870); Pastimes (1870–1871); National Association of Professional Base Ball Players: Fort Wayne Kekiongas (1870–1871); Washington Nationals (1872); Baltimore Marylands (1873)

William H. Lennon (January 3, 1845 – August 19, 1910) was an American professional baseball player born in Brooklyn, New York. He played catcher for three seasons in the National Association from 1871 to 1873, and managed 14 games for the 1871 Fort Wayne Kekiongas. Lennon also played first base, shortstop, third base, and right field during his professional career. He worked a total of 15 National Association games as an umpire between 1871 and 1874.

During the 1870 National Association of Base Ball Players season, Lennon, along with Bobby Mathews and Tom Carey, was lured away from the Maryland team to join the Kekiongas, who joined the new all-professional National Association in 1871. On May 4, 1871, Lennon, Fort Wayne's starting catcher, scored the first run in the opening game of the newly formed National Association of Professional Base Ball Players, when they defeated the visiting Cleveland Forest Citys 2-0. Also that day, he became the first catcher to throw out a baserunner attempting to steal a base. Lennon was accused by the Kekiongas front office of being a drinker during his playing days and deserting the club in mid-July of the 1871 season. This occurred while Lennon was in Cleveland umpiring a game between the Forest Citys and the Philadelphia Athletics. On July 23, 1871, the Kekiongas discharged Ed Mincher (Lennon's future brother-in-law) and Pete Donnelly, claiming the players violated their contracts when they left the club without warning or permission and that the two men were also in arrearages with the organization. Mincher and Donnelly denied the accusations, claiming the team actually owed them money. Then, on July 25, the organization leveled four charges against Lennon. The first claim was that Lennon abandoned the team during a game with the Brooklyn Atlantics on July 23. The second was that Lennon “violated all rules of decency” on June 24 while at the Hotel Earle in New York, and that he “refused to obey orders” leveled by the team’s directors. The third allegation stated Lennon “violated all obligations and rules of said club,” refused to practice, and was believed to be “in public under the influence of intoxicating liquors.” The final indictment accused Lennon of not notifying the team when he left to umpire the July 23 game in Cleveland. Lennon denied all charges.

Lennon’s response to the charges was printed in the July 28, 1871 edition of the Chicago Tribune. In his defense, Lennon points out that due to the state of his hand, management told him he would not have to play in the game against the Atlantics. Addressing the “refused to obey orders” charge, Lennon explained this was likely related to a game against the New York Mutuals for which he was once again told to “lay off” due to his hand. He went on to deny being under the influence of intoxicating liquors while in New York or any other city he visited with the team. Lennon also brought up the issue of salary. With a contract he claims was supposed to pay him $75 a month ($7 every Saturday and the remainder at the end of the month), Lennon stated he never received the full amount due. The Chicago Tribune defended Lennon and blasted the Fort Wayne front office, labeling them as cheap and mean spirited, and stating that their players were treated as though they lived in a company town, with deductions from salary to cover things like board while on the road, train fare, etc. The newspaper found it nearly impossible for a player to become intoxicated on the little money with which they were left after these deductions, and that Lennon’s case is representative of how the entire team was treated. The Philadelphia Mercury suggested, “The officers of the Kekiongas … gained an unenviable reputation for the manner in which they have treated their professional players, and when any of said players, in disgust at such treatment, left them, they had the unblushing impudence to publicly expel them on trumped-up charges.” These firings may have been related to the financial difficulties faced by the Fort Wayne organization. The club was formed as a cooperative, meaning the players shared in the gate receipts in lieu of salary. Dwindling attendance dollars plagued the team from the beginning. Harry Deane was promoted to manage the team for the rest of the season.

Bill Lennon died at the age of 65 from a stroke in Philadelphia, Pennsylvania, and was buried at the Holy Cross Cemetery.

List of Lennon's amateur and professional team affiliations

- Americus of Brooklyn, 1863
- Stars of Brooklyn, 1863-1864
- Enterprise of Brooklyn, 1865
- Franklin Junior of Brooklyn, 1866-1867
- Excelsiors of Brooklyn, 1867
- Mohawks of Brooklyn, 1868
- Harmonic of Brooklyn, 1868
- Excelsiors of Chicago, August 1868
- Marylands, 1869-1870
- Pastimes, 1870-1871
- Ft. Wayne Kekiongas, 1870-1871 (NAPBBP)
- Washington Nationals, 1872 (NAPBBP)
- Baltimore Marylands, 1873 (NAPBBP)

Records
Preceded by none	Oldest recognized verified living baseball player May 4, 1871 – May 5, 1871	Succeeded by Harry Wright
