= Charles Bierman =

American baseball player (1845–1879)

- First baseman
- Born: c. 1845; Hoboken, New Jersey, U.S.
- Died: August 4, 1879 (aged 33–34); Hoboken, New Jersey, U.S.
- Batted: Unknown Threw: Unknown

MLB debut
- June 21, 1871, for the Fort Wayne Kekiongas

Last MLB appearance
- June 21, 1871, for the Fort Wayne Kekiongas

MLB statistics
- Games played: 1
- At bats: 2
- Bases on balls: 1
- Stats at Baseball Reference

Teams
- National Association of Base Ball Players New York Mutuals (1867–1868) Troy Haymakers (1868–1869) Baltimore Marylands (1870) Union of Morrisania (1870) National Association of Professional BBP Fort Wayne Kekiongas (1871)

Charles S. Bierman (c. 1845 – August 4, 1879) was an American professional baseball player who played one game for the Fort Wayne Kekiongas in 1871. He went hitless in two at bats, had one walk, and committed two errors at first base. Bierman died in his hometown of Hoboken, New Jersey on August 4, 1879, and is interred at Hoboken Cemetery.
