= Jim Foran =

American baseball player (1847–1906)

- First baseman
- Born: c. 1847; Pennsylvania, U.S.
- Died: November 29, 1906; Newark, New Jersey, U.S.
- Batted: Unknown Threw: Unknown

MLB debut
- May 4, 1871, for the Fort Wayne Kekiongas

Last MLB appearance
- August 29, 1871, for the Fort Wayne Kekiongas

MLB statistics
- Games played: 19
- Hits: 31
- Batting average: .348
- Stats at Baseball Reference

Teams
- National Association of Base Ball Players Philadelphia Athletics (1869) Troy Haymakers (1870) National Association of Professional BBP Fort Wayne Kekiongas (1871)

James Henry Foran (c. 1847 – November 29, 1906) was an American Major League Baseball player from Pennsylvania, and a participant in the first game ever played in a professional baseball league, between his Fort Wayne Kekiongas and the Cleveland Forest Citys on May 4, 1871. Foran had one single in four at-bats, one of only four hits Ft. Wayne had that day; nonetheless, the Kekiongas won, 2-0.

Foran first played in the amateur NABBP in 1869, holding down third base for the original Philadelphia Athletics. He is credited with 147 hits and 147 runs scored against only 89 "hands lost" (one of the best marks on the club), leading the Athletics to a 45-8 record. (A batter was given a "hand lost" every time he made at out at bat or on the base paths.) In 1870, he moved to the Union club of Lansingburgh, New York (who changed their name to the better-known Troy Haymakers in 1871); Foran played the outfield and notched 109 hits in 39 games.

The following season, with the advent of the all-professional National Association, Foran headed to Fort Wayne, Indiana—easily the smallest city in the fledgling circuit. He played mostly first base, but did appear in three games in the outfield. In total, he appeared in 19 games as a member of the Kekiongas, and had a .348 batting average, with 31 hits in 89 at bats—by far the best on the team, and 13th-best in the entire Association. Foran also led the team in hits, runs scored, RBIs, triples, and tied for the team lead in home runs, with one.

Despite the presence of Foran and 19-year-old pitcher Bobby Mathews (who would go on to win nearly 300 MLB games), the Kekiongas franchise folded after compiling a 7-12 record, finishing seventh among the nine teams in the league. Foran never again played in MLB, but, after making his way to California, did play for San Francisco and Oakland clubs in the original California League from 1879-81.

Jim Foran died in Newark, New Jersey, and is interred at the Holy Sepulchre Cemetery in Newark.
