= Bill Kelly (outfielder) =

American baseball player

- Outfielder
- Born: Unknown; New York, New York, U.S.
- Died: Unknown
- Batted: Unknown Threw: Unknown

MLB debut
- May 4, 1871, for the Fort Wayne Kekiongas

Last MLB appearance
- August 29, 1871, for the Fort Wayne Kekiongas

MLB statistics
- At bats: 67
- Runs: 16
- Home runs: 0
- Batting average: .224
- Stats at Baseball Reference

Teams
- Fort Wayne Kekiongas (1871)

William J. Kelly was an American professional baseball player. He played in 18 games for the Fort Wayne Kekiongas in the first professional league, the 1871 National Association of Professional Base Ball Players (NAPBBP).
