= 1871 Rockford Forest Citys season =

1871 Rockford Forest Citys
- League: National Association of Professional Base Ball Players
- Ballpark: Agricultural Society Fair Grounds
- City: Rockford, Illinois
- Record: 4–21 (.160)
- League place: 9th
- Managers: Scott Hastings

The Rockford Forest Citys played their first and only season in 1871 as a charter member of the National Association of Professional Base Ball Players. They finished ninth in the league with a record of 4–21. They folded after the season.

== Regular season ==
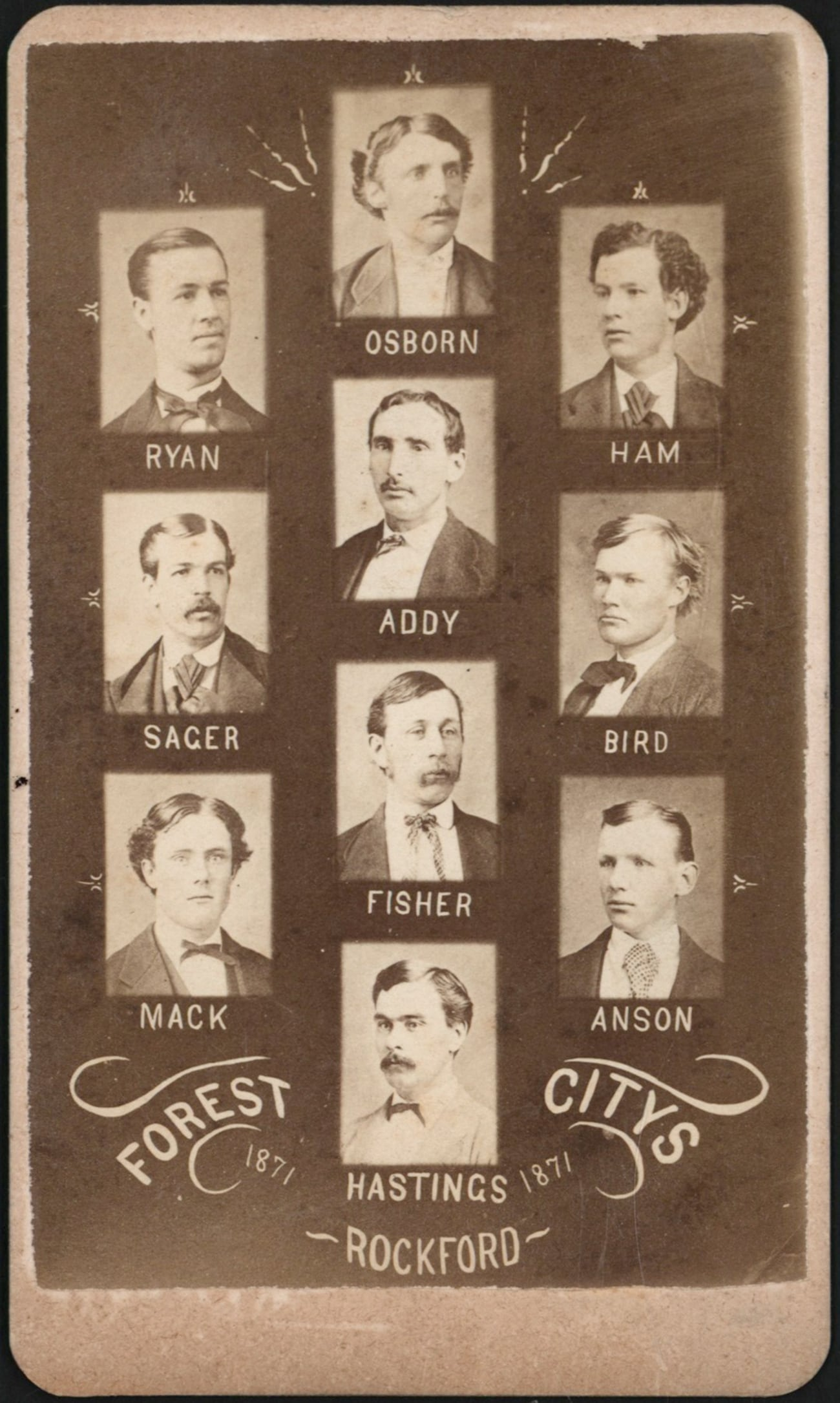
Cabinet card of the 1871 Rockford Forest Citys

Rockford finished with 4 wins and 21 losses, 15½ games behind the champion Philadelphia Athletics club and good for last place. Player-manager Scott Hastings was found to have violated the "60 day rule" implemented by the league—if a player switched teams during the season, the team had to bench him for 60 days before he could play. Hastings had jumped from a Louisiana team to the Forest Citys in the spring and immediately begun playing for Rockford. This complaint was brought before the league, and the Forest Citys were forced to forfeit 4 of their wins.

The star of the team was Cap Anson, who hit .325 for the Forest Citys and would go on to become the player-manager of the Chicago White Stockings for over 20 seasons. Anson was inducted into the Hall of Fame in 1939.

=== Season standings ===
Pos	Team	Pld	W	L	T	RF	RA	RD	PCT	GB
1	Philadelphia Athletics (C)	28	21	7	0	376	266	+110	.750	—
2	Chicago White Stockings	28	19	9	0	302	241	+61	.679	2
3	Boston Red Stockings	31	20	10	1	401	303	+98	.661	2
4	Washington Olympics	32	15	15	2	310	303	+7	.500	7
5	New York Mutuals	33	16	17	0	302	313	−11	.485	7.5
6	Troy Haymakers	29	13	15	1	351	362	−11	.466	8
7	Fort Wayne Kekiongas	19	7	12	0	137	243	−106	.368	9.5
8	Cleveland Forest Citys	29	10	19	0	249	341	−92	.345	11.5
9	Rockford Forest Citys	25	4	21	0	231	287	−56	.160	15.5

Source: Baseball Reference
(C) Champions

=== Record vs. opponents ===
1871 National Association Records Sources:
Team	BOS	CHI	CLE	FW	NY	PHI	ROC	TRO	WSH
Boston	—	1–3	3–1	2–0	2–2	3–1	3–0	3–2	3–1–1
Chicago	3–1	—	2–1	2–0	3–1	2–3	3–0	1–1	3–2
Cleveland	1–3	1–2	—	0–3	3–2	0–3	3–1	2–2	0–3
Fort Wayne	0–2	0–2	3–0	—	1–2	0–2	1–1	1–1	1–2
New York	2–2	1–3	2–3	2–1	—	2–3	3–1	1–3	3–1
Philadelphia	1–3	3–2	3–0	2–0	3–2	—	3–0	3–0	3–0
Rockford	0–3	0–3	1–3	1–1	1–3	0–3	—	1–2	0–3
Troy	2–3	1–1	2–2	1–1	3–1	0–3	2–1	—	2–3–1
Washington	1–3–1	2–3	3–0	2–1	1–3	0–3	3–0	3–2–1	—

=== Roster ===
1871 Rockford Forest Citys
Roster
Pitchers: Cherokee Fisher	Catchers: Scott Hastings; Infielders: Bob Addy; Cap Anson; Chick Fulmer; Denny Mack; Pony Sager	Outfielders: Al Barker; George Bird; Ralph Ham; Gat Stires	Manager: Scott Hastings

== Player stats ==
=== Batting ===
==== Starters by position ====
Note: Pos = Position; G = Games played; AB = At bats; H = Hits; Avg. = Batting average; HR = Home runs; RBI = Runs batted in

Pos	Player	G	AB	H	Avg.	HR	RBI
C	Scott Hastings	25	118	30	.254	0	20
1B	Denny Mack	25	122	30	.246	0	17
2B	Bob Addy	25	118	32	.271	0	13
SS	Chick Fulmer	16	63	17	.270	0	3
3B	Cap Anson	25	120	39	.325	0	16
OF	George Bird	25	106	28	.264	0	13
OF	Ralph Ham	25	113	28	.248	0	12
OF	Gat Stires	25	110	30	.273	2	24

==== Other batters ====
Note: G = Games played; AB = At bats; H = Hits; Avg. = Batting average; HR = Home runs; RBI = Runs batted in

Player	G	AB	H	Avg.	HR	RBI
Pony Sager	8	39	11	.282	0	5
Al Barker	1	4	1	.250	0	2

=== Pitching ===
==== Starting pitchers ====
Note: G = Games pitched; IP = Innings pitched; W = Wins; L = Losses; ERA = Earned run average; SO = Strikeouts

Player	G	IP	W	L	ERA	SO
Cherokee Fisher	24	213.0	4	16	4.35	15

==== Relief pitchers ====
Note: G = Games pitched; IP = Innings pitched; W = Wins; L = Losses; ERA = Earned run average; SO = Strikeouts

Player	G	IP	W	L	ERA	SO
Denny Mack	3	13.0	0	1	3.46	1
