= Robert Armstrong (baseball) =

American baseball player (1850–1917)

- Center fielder
- Born: July 4, 1850; Baltimore, Maryland, US
- Died: December 3, 1917 (aged 67); Fort Worth, Texas, US
- Batted: Unknown Threw: Unknown

MLB debut
- June 26, 1871, for the Fort Wayne Kekiongas

Last MLB appearance
- August 29, 1871, for the Fort Wayne Kekiongas

MLB statistics
- Batting average: .224
- Home runs: 0
- Runs batted in: 5
- Stats at Baseball Reference

Teams
- National Association of Base Ball Players Baltimore Marylands (1868–1870) National Association of Professional BBP Fort Wayne Kekiongas (1871)

Robert Livingston Armstrong (July 4, 1850 – December 3, 1917) was an American professional baseball player. He played 12 of 21 games, 11 in center field, for the Fort Wayne Kekiongas in the first professional league, the 1871 National Association of Professional Base Ball Players (NAPBBP).

Previously Armstrong played three seasons for the Maryland club of Baltimore, Maryland in the National Association of Base Ball Players. The Marylands were a strong club among the hundreds of NABBP members but a weak club among the twelve that contested the first professional pennant race in 1869, or the second one in 1870.

Bob Armstrong was the son of John Horatio Armstrong and Caroline Amelia Scheldt and great-grandson of John Armstrong Jr. He was 6'2" and was married to Betty Arnold. Armstrong was a Baltimore native like most of his Maryland teammates.
