= 1871 New York Mutuals season =

1871 New York Mutuals
- League: National Association of Professional Base Ball Players
- Ballpark: Union Grounds
- City: New York, New York
- Record: 16–17 (.485)
- League place: 5th
- Owners: William Cammeyer
- Managers: Bob Ferguson

The New York Mutuals baseball team (1857–1876) joined the National Association for the league's debut season in 1871. The Mutuals went 16-17 and finished in fifth place. Pitcher Rynie Wolters led the NA in runs batted in, with 44.

== Regular season ==
The 1871 regular playing season stats:

=== Season standings ===
Pos	Team	Pld	W	L	T	RF	RA	RD	PCT	GB
1	Philadelphia Athletics (C)	28	21	7	0	376	266	+110	.750	—
2	Chicago White Stockings	28	19	9	0	302	241	+61	.679	2
3	Boston Red Stockings	31	20	10	1	401	303	+98	.661	2
4	Washington Olympics	32	15	15	2	310	303	+7	.500	7
5	New York Mutuals	33	16	17	0	302	313	−11	.485	7.5
6	Troy Haymakers	29	13	15	1	351	362	−11	.466	8
7	Fort Wayne Kekiongas	19	7	12	0	137	243	−106	.368	9.5
8	Cleveland Forest Citys	29	10	19	0	249	341	−92	.345	11.5
9	Rockford Forest Citys	25	4	21	0	231	287	−56	.160	15.5

Source: Baseball Reference
(C) Champions

=== Record vs. opponents ===
1871 National Association Records Sources:
Team	BOS	CHI	CLE	FW	NY	PHI	ROC	TRO	WSH
Boston	—	1–3	3–1	2–0	2–2	3–1	3–0	3–2	3–1–1
Chicago	3–1	—	2–1	2–0	3–1	2–3	3–0	1–1	3–2
Cleveland	1–3	1–2	—	0–3	3–2	0–3	3–1	2–2	0–3
Fort Wayne	0–2	0–2	3–0	—	1–2	0–2	1–1	1–1	1–2
New York	2–2	1–3	2–3	2–1	—	2–3	3–1	1–3	3–1
Philadelphia	1–3	3–2	3–0	2–0	3–2	—	3–0	3–0	3–0
Rockford	0–3	0–3	1–3	1–1	1–3	0–3	—	1–2	0–3
Troy	2–3	1–1	2–2	1–1	3–1	0–3	2–1	—	2–3–1
Washington	1–3–1	2–3	3–0	2–1	1–3	0–3	3–0	3–2–1	—

=== Roster ===
1871 New York Mutuals
Roster
Pitchers: Frank Fleet; Rynie Wolters	Catchers: Charlie Mills; Infielders: Bob Ferguson; Dick Higham; Dickey Pearce; Charlie Smith; Joe Start	Outfielders: Dave Eggler; John Hatfield; Tom Patterson	Manager: Bob Ferguson

== Player stats ==
=== Starters by position ===
Note: Pos = Position; G = Games played; AB = At bats; H = Hits; Avg. = Batting average; HR = Home runs; RBI = Runs batted in

Pos	Player	G	AB	H	Avg.	HR	RBI
C	Charlie Mills	32	146	36	.247	0	22
1B	Joe Start	33	161	58	.360	1	34
2B	Dick Higham	21	94	34	.362	0	9
SS	Dickey Pearce	33	163	44	.270	0	20
3B	Bob Ferguson	33	158	38	.241	0	25
OF	Tom Patterson	32	151	31	.205	0	13
OF	Dave Eggler	33	147	47	.320	0	18
OF	John Hatfield	33	168	43	.256	0	22

=== Other batters ===
Note: G = Games played; AB = At bats; H = Hits; Avg. = Batting average; HR = Home runs; RBI = Runs batted in

Player	G	AB	H	Avg.	HR	RBI
Charlie Smith	14	72	19	.264	0	5

=== Starting pitchers ===
Note: G = Games pitched; IP = Innings pitched; W = Wins; L = Losses; ERA = Earned run average; SO = Strikeouts

Player	G	IP	W	L	ERA	SO
Rynie Wolters	32	283.0	16	16	3.43	22
Frank Fleet	1	9.0	0	1	10.00	0

==== Relief pitchers ====
Note: G = Games pitched; IP = Innings pitched; W = Wins; L = Losses; ERA = Earned run average; SO = Strikeouts

Player	G	IP	W	L	ERA	SO
Bob Ferguson	1	1.0	0	0	27.00	0
