= Ed Mincher =

American baseball player (1851–1918)

- Outfielder
- Born: June 17, 1851; Baltimore, Maryland, U.S.
- Died: December 8, 1918 (aged 67); Brooklyn, New York, U.S.
- Batted: Unknown Threw: Unknown

MLB debut
- May 4, 1871, for the Fort Wayne Kekiongas

Last MLB appearance
- June 26, 1872, for the Washington Nationals

MLB statistics
- Batting average: .157
- Home Runs: 0
- RBI: 9
- Stats at Baseball Reference

Teams
- National Association of Base Ball Players: Baltimore Marylands (1868–1870); National Association of Professional BBP: Fort Wayne Kekiongas 1871; Washington Nationals 1872

Edward John Mincher (June 7, 1851 – August 12, 1918) was an American professional baseball player. He is considered a "major leaguer" for parts of two seasons with the Fort Wayne Kekiongas and Washington Nationals.

Previously he was an outfielder for the Maryland club of Baltimore, 1868 to 1870. Maryland was one of the pioneer pro clubs when the National Association first permitted professional members in 1869.

Mincher was born in Baltimore, Maryland and died in Brooklyn, New York at the age of 67.

== Sources ==
- Career statistics from Baseball Reference · Baseball Reference (Minors) · Retrosheet
- Wright, Marshall (2000). The National Association of Base Ball Players, 1857-1870. Jefferson, NC: McFarland & Co. ISBN 0-7864-0779-4. Pages 199, 250, 304.
