= Pete Donnelly (baseball) =

American baseball player

- Outfielder
- Batted: Unknown Threw: Unknown

MLB debut
- May 13, 1871, for the Fort Wayne Kekiongas

Last MLB appearance
- July 8, 1871, for the Fort Wayne Kekiongas

MLB statistics
- Batting average: .206
- Home runs: 0
- Runs batted in: 3
- Stats at Baseball Reference

Teams
- Fort Wayne Kekiongas (1871)

Peter J. Donnelly was an outfielder in professional baseball. He played for the Fort Wayne Kekiongas in the National Association in 1871.
