= 1871 Washington Olympics season =

1871 Washington Olympics
- League: National Association of Professional Base Ball Players
- Ballpark: Olympics Grounds
- City: Washington, D.C.
- Record: 15–15–2 (.500)
- League place: 4th
- Managers: Nick Young

The Washington Olympics played their first season in 1871 as a charter member of the National Association of Professional Base Ball Players. They finished fourth in the league with a record of 15–15.

== Regular season ==
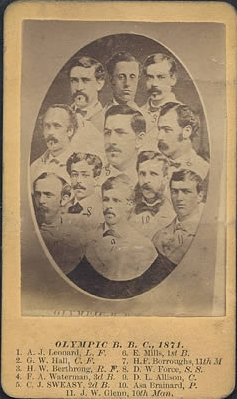
Cabinet card of the 1871 Washington Olympics

=== Season standings ===
Pos	Team	Pld	W	L	T	RF	RA	RD	PCT	GB
1	Philadelphia Athletics (C)	28	21	7	0	376	266	+110	.750	—
2	Chicago White Stockings	28	19	9	0	302	241	+61	.679	2
3	Boston Red Stockings	31	20	10	1	401	303	+98	.661	2
4	Washington Olympics	32	15	15	2	310	303	+7	.500	7
5	New York Mutuals	33	16	17	0	302	313	−11	.485	7.5
6	Troy Haymakers	29	13	15	1	351	362	−11	.466	8
7	Fort Wayne Kekiongas	19	7	12	0	137	243	−106	.368	9.5
8	Cleveland Forest Citys	29	10	19	0	249	341	−92	.345	11.5
9	Rockford Forest Citys	25	4	21	0	231	287	−56	.160	15.5

Source: Baseball Reference
(C) Champions

=== Record vs. opponents ===
1871 National Association Records Sources:
Team	BOS	CHI	CLE	FW	NY	PHI	ROC	TRO	WSH
Boston	—	1–3	3–1	2–0	2–2	3–1	3–0	3–2	3–1–1
Chicago	3–1	—	2–1	2–0	3–1	2–3	3–0	1–1	3–2
Cleveland	1–3	1–2	—	0–3	3–2	0–3	3–1	2–2	0–3
Fort Wayne	0–2	0–2	3–0	—	1–2	0–2	1–1	1–1	1–2
New York	2–2	1–3	2–3	2–1	—	2–3	3–1	1–3	3–1
Philadelphia	1–3	3–2	3–0	2–0	3–2	—	3–0	3–0	3–0
Rockford	0–3	0–3	1–3	1–1	1–3	0–3	—	1–2	0–3
Troy	2–3	1–1	2–2	1–1	3–1	0–3	2–1	—	2–3–1
Washington	1–3–1	2–3	3–0	2–1	1–3	0–3	3–0	3–2–1	—

=== Roster ===
1871 Washington Olympics
Roster
Pitchers: Asa Brainard; Bill Stearns	Catchers: Doug Allison; Infielders: Davy Force; Andy Leonard; Everett Mills; Frank Norton; Charlie Sweasy; Fred Waterman; Warren White	Outfielders: Tommy Beals; Harry Berthrong; Henry Burroughs; John Glenn; George Hall	Manager Nick Young

== Player stats ==
=== Batting ===
==== Starters by position ====
Note: Pos = Position; G = Games played; AB = At bats; H = Hits; Avg. = Batting average; HR = Home runs; RBI = Runs batted in

Pos	Player	G	AB	H	Avg.	HR	RBI
C	Doug Allison	27	133	44	.331	2	27
1B	Everett Mills	32	157	43	.274	1	24
2B	Andy Leonard	31	148	43	.291	0	30
SS	Davy Force	32	162	45	.278	0	29
3B	Fred Waterman	32	158	50	.316	0	17
OF	John Glenn	26	120	37	.308	0	21
OF	George Hall	32	136	40	.294	2	17
OF	Harry Berthrong	17	73	17	.233	0	8

==== Other batters ====
Note: G = Games played; AB = At bats; H = Hits; Avg. = Batting average; HR = Home runs; RBI = Runs batted in

Player	G	AB	H	Avg.	HR	RBI
Henry Burroughs	12	63	15	.238	1	14
Tommy Beals	10	36	7	.194	0	1
Charlie Sweasy	5	19	4	.211	0	4
Warren White	1	4	0	.000	0	0
Frank Norton	1	1	0	.000	0	0

=== Pitching ===
==== Starting pitchers ====
Note: G = Games pitched; IP = Innings pitched; W = Wins; L = Losses; ERA = Earned run average; SO = Strikeouts

Player	G	IP	W	L	ERA	SO
Asa Brainard	30	264.0	12	15	4.50	13
Bill Stearns	2	18.0	2	0	2.50	0
