= Harry Deane =

American baseball player (1846–1925)

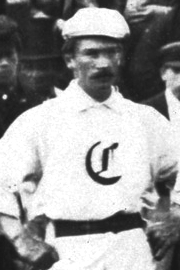
- Center fielder / Manager
- Born: May 6, 1846; Trenton, New Jersey, U.S.
- Died: May 31, 1925 (aged 79); Indianapolis, Indiana, U.S.
- Batted: Unknown Threw: Unknown

Major-league debut
- July 12, 1871, for the Fort Wayne Kekiongas

Last major-league appearance
- October 14, 1874, for the Baltimore Canaries

Major-league statistics
- Batting average: .240
- Runs scored: 32
- RBIs: 15
- Stats at Baseball Reference

Teams
- National Association of Base Ball Players Cincinnati Red Stockings (1870) League Player Fort Wayne Kekiongas (1871) Baltimore Canaries (1874) League Manager Fort Wayne Kekiongas (1871)

John Henry "Harry" Deane (May 6, 1846 – May 31, 1925) was an American professional baseball player born in Trenton, New Jersey. He mostly played center field in his two-season career in the National Association. He played in six games while managing five for the 1871 Fort Wayne Kekiongas, and 46 games for the 1874 Baltimore Canaries.

== Career ==
In 1870, Deane was a substitute player for the Cincinnati Red Stockings. When the team's biggest star George Wright injured his knee and missed 16 games, Deane played Andy Leonard's outfield position while the latter replaced Wright at shortstop.

The Fort Wayne team joined the new National Association in 1871, an organization made of all-professional teams from around the country. He played in six games, batting .182 and playing all of his games in left field. After just 14 games into the season, and a 5–9 record, Bill Lennon was relieved of his on-field command, and Deane replaced him, finishing the final games the team played with a 2–3 record. Deane joined the Baltimore Canaries in 1874, playing the majority of his time in center field. He finished the season with a .246 batting average in 47 games played.

== Post-career ==
Deane died at the age of 79 in Indianapolis, Indiana, and was buried at Crown Hill Cemetery.
