= Kekionga Ball Grounds =

Former baseball park in Fort Wayne, Indiana

The Kekiongas have a splendid ground for playing upon this year. They have six acres enclosed with a high, tight board fence, measuring 1,900 feet lineal, and seats for the convenience of spectators, with canopy overhead.

— Fort Wayne Daily Gazette, May 21, 1870

The Kekionga Ball Grounds was a baseball field in Fort Wayne, Indiana. Built in 1870, it was located on the site of the former Camp Allen, a Union Army base during the civil war, north of what is now Camp Allen Park, and named for Kekionga, the former capital of the Miami tribe which was located at the site of modern Fort Wayne. The precise size and orientation of the Kekionga Ball Grounds is lost, but it was in area on the left bank of the St. Marys River now bounded by Mechanics Street, Elm Street, Cherry Street, Camp Allen Drive, and Fair Street.

The first National Association game was played at the Kekionga Ball Grounds on May 4, 1871. This was the first professional baseball league game, the first professional league game in any sport in America, and possibly the first game of Major League Baseball (if one credits the National Association as a major league, which some people do and some don't). The Fort Wayne Kekiongas defeated Cleveland by a score of 2–0. Bobby Mathews pitched the shutout for the Kekiongas; the umpire was John Boake.

A monument to this first game was placed in 2017.

At the time of the 1871 game, a covered grandstand called the "Grand Dutchess" provided spectator accommodations. The Grand Dutchess was open only to women and men accompanying them. (Some sources give "Grand Duchess" as the name of the ballfield itself, but contemporary records contradict this.) The Grand Duchess burned to the ground on November 5, 1871.

The Kekiongas folded before the end of the 1871 season, so the Kekionga Ball Grounds only hosted eight other major league games.

== League Park ==
A monument at Headwaters Park on the right bank of the St. Marys River (41°5′6.0″N 85°8′21.4″W), says that the first major league game was played there, at League Park ballfield.

However, the Kekiongas never played at League Park, and the historic marker is incorrect. But two major league games were played there, in 1902.

At the southwest corner of the flats, called the "Jail Flats" (and erroneously named the "Jailhouse Flats"), the Cleveland Bronchos played two Sunday home games there, because Sunday baseball was outlawed in Cleveland (it was in Fort Wayne also, but the ordinance was not enforced). Addie Joss pitched the Bronchos to a 6–4 victory on Sunday, June 22, 1902, and Cy Young and the Boston Americans beat the Bronchos 3–1 on Sunday, August 31, 1902. These were the last major league games played in Fort Wayne.

== Hamilton Field ==
Allen Hamilton and his heirs owned fields in downtown Fort Wayne, on which at various times amateur baseball games and practices were conducted, beginning in 1862. The precise location of the ballfield on Hamilton's fields is lost, but it was in an area now bounded by Calhoun, Wallace, Barr, and Williams Streets, south of the Pittsburgh, Fort Wayne, and Chicago Railroad tracks.

Teams that played on Hamilton's property included the Kekiongas, in their amateur days. Due to various confusions and flaws in the historical records, some sources give "Hamilton Field" – located north of the train tracks, at the corner of Lewis and Calhoun streets – as the location of the first major league game. But it wasn't, nor was there likely ever any place called "Hamilton Field" as a proper noun.

== Swinney Park ==
One other major league baseball game was played in Fort Wayne: on October 24, 1882, Chicago defeated Providence 19–7 in the deciding game of the National League postseason series. This game was played at Swinney Park, which was probably located about where the Swinney Tennis Center is now (41°4′20.7″N 85°9′32.8″W).

== See also ==
- Sports in Fort Wayne, Indiana
