= Bill Barrett (utility player) =

American baseball player

- Utility player
- Born: Baltimore or Washington, D.C., U.S.
- Batted: Unknown Threw: Unknown

MLB debut
- July 8, 1871, for the Fort Wayne Kekiongas

Last MLB appearance
- October 18, 1873, for the Baltimore Canaries

MLB statistics
- Batting average: .154
- Runs scored: 1
- Runs batted in: 1
- Stats at Baseball Reference

Teams
- Fort Wayne Kekiongas (1871); Washington Olympics (1872); Baltimore Canaries (1873)

William Barrett was an American professional baseball player from 1871 to 1873. He was born in either Baltimore or Washington, D.C., and played parts of three seasons in the National Association of Professional Base Ball Players, including at least one game with each of the Fort Wayne Kekiongas (1871), Washington Olympics (1872), and Baltimore Canaries (1873). According to records of The Sporting News, he also played during the 1872 season for the Brooklyn Atlantics. According to Baseball-Reference.com, he made his debut on July 8, 1871, and was the 102nd person to compete in the National Association. He also played at least three games with the Pastime Club of Baltimore during the 1871 season. He played as a catcher, third baseman, shortstop, and outfielder. He recorded a single, a double, a run batted in, and scored a run in 13 major league at bats.

Barrett served as an National Association umpire for three games in 1872 and one game in 1874.

In 2012, Bill Carle, the chair of the Society for American Baseball Research (SABR) Biographical Research Committee, wrote a profile on Barrett in SABR's Biographical Research Committee Report. Carle reported on records indicating that Barrett also played amateur baseball in Baltimore (professional baseball did not begin until the 1870s). Carle also reported that a SABR researcher had found a possible match for Barrett, who was born in Baltimore on July 12, 1850, and died in Chicago on February 18, 1909. Carle, however, found insufficient proof that this candidate was actually Barrett, the baseball player.
