= James McDermott (baseball) =

American baseball player (1846–1882)

- Pitcher
- Born: c. 1846; Brooklyn, New York, U.S.
- Died: September 4, 1882; Brooklyn, New York, U.S.
- Batted: Unknown Threw: Unknown

MLB debut
- May 4, 1871, for the Fort Wayne Kekiongas

Last MLB appearance
- July 6, 1872, for the Brooklyn Eckfords

MLB statistics
- Games played: 9
- Batting average: .281
- Win–loss record: 0–7
- Earned run average: 8.14
- Stats at Baseball Reference

Teams
- National Association of Base Ball Players Brooklyn Eckfords (1870) National Association of Professional BBP Fort Wayne Kekiongas (1871) Brooklyn Eckfords (1872)

James McDermott (c. 1846 – September 4, 1882) was an American baseball player in the first professional league. He played two games in the outfield for the 1871 Fort Wayne Kekiongas and seven games as pitcher for the 1872 Brooklyn Eckfords.

McDermott previously played for the Eckfords in the second of that club's professional seasons, 1870. While the team won 2, tied 1, and lost 12 pro matches, he was the regular pitcher. Overall, he appeared in 20 games on record, one behind the team leaders, and he was an ordinary batter in the company of his teammates.
