= Rockford Forest Citys =

Defunct American baseball team

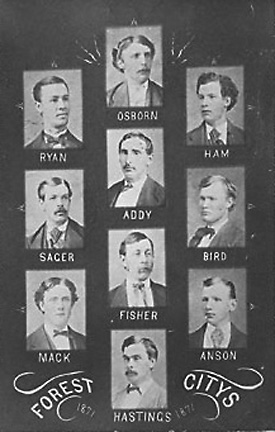
Cabinet card of the 1871 Rockford Forest Citys

Rockford Forest Citys (officially the Forest City Club), from Rockford, Illinois, was one of the first professional baseball clubs. Rockford played for one season during the National Association inaugural year of 1871. They are not to be confused with the Cleveland Forest Citys, who played in the same league. "Forest City" is a nickname used by the cities of Rockford and Cleveland.

== Origins ==
From 1868 to 1870, future Hall of Famer Albert Spalding and infielder Ross Barnes starred for Rockford while the club was still considered an 'amateur' team. In reality, the Forest Citys were one of the first ball clubs to pay players. Rockford played their home games at the Agricultural Society Fair Grounds, most of which still exists as Fairgrounds Park.

== 1871 season ==
Rockford finished in last place with 4 wins and 21 losses, 15½ games behind the champion Philadelphia Athletics. Their poor record was partially because player-manager Scott Hastings was found to have violated the "60 day rule" implemented by the league—if a player switched teams during the season, the team had to bench him for 60 days before he could play. Hastings had jumped from an independent team (the Lone Star club of New Orleans) to the Forest Citys in the spring and immediately begun playing for Rockford. This complaint was brought before the league, and the Forest Citys were forced to forfeit four games they had won, including a game played on June 15, just a day before Hastings would have been eligible to appear. Since two of the forfeits came against the first-place Athletics, who finished two games in front of both the Boston Red Stockings and the Chicago White Stockings, Rockford's decision to play Hastings had an outsize impact on the 1871 pennant race.

The star of the Forest Citys was Cap Anson, who hit .325 in 1871 and would go on to become the player-manager of the Chicago White Stockings for over 20 seasons. Anson was inducted into the Hall of Fame in 1939.

== Folding ==
Rockford had faced significant financial hardship during 1871, including travel costs, and did not make a profit. Additionally, star Anson decided to accept a $1,250 contract offer from Philadelphia for the 1872 season. So, the club folded after its first and only season.
