= Rynie Wolters =

Dutch baseball player (1844–1917)

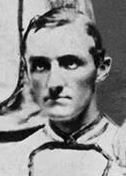
- Pitcher / Outfielder
- Born: March 17, 1844; Nieuweschans, Netherlands
- Died: January 3, 1917 (aged 72); Newark, New Jersey, U.S.
- Batted: Unknown Threw: Right

Major league debut
- May 18, 1871, for the New York Mutuals

Last major league appearance
- April 28, 1873, for the Elizabeth Resolutes

Major league statistics
- Win–loss record: 19-23
- Earned run average: 3.90
- Batting average: .318
- Stats at Baseball Reference

Teams
- National Association of Base Ball Players Irvington of Irvington, New Jersey (1866–1867) New York Mutuals (1868–1870) National Association of Professional BBP New York Mutuals (1871) Cleveland Forest Citys (1872) Elizabeth Resolutes (1873)

Career highlights and awards
- NA RBI champion (1871)

Reinder Albertus Wolters (March 17, 1844 – January 3, 1917) was an American amateur and professional baseball player. He was born in Nieuweschans, the Netherlands, and was the first professional baseball player from that country. He played for an amateur team in Newark, New Jersey, in 1865, then played five seasons in the amateur National Association of Base Ball Players from 1866 to 1870 and three seasons in its professional successor, the National Association, from 1871 to 1873. While he was primarily a pitcher, he also played occasionally in the outfield.

Wolters joined the New York Mutuals in 1868, replacing starting pitcher Phonney Martin. On July 23, 1870, Wolters, pitching for New York, threw the first shutout in baseball history, beating the Chicago White Stockings 9–0. He also tripled and scored a run in the game. At the end of the 1870 season, he again faced Chicago. In the ninth inning, with his team ahead by one run, he walked off the mound in protest of the home plate umpire's strike zone calls. The game ended, with the score reverting to the previous inning, giving Chicago the win and the league title.

His first and best professional season was in 1871 with the Mutuals, when he pitched 283 innings and had a 3.43 earned run average (ERA). He also led the National Association with 44 runs batted in as a hitter, though that statistic was not officially tracked during his life. His second year was with the Cleveland Forest Citys, where he played much less and had a higher ERA. In his last year, he only pitched one game, with the Elizabeth Resolutes. He pitched a complete game but allowed 23 unearned runs.

In addition to abandoning the 1870 game against Chicago, Wolters left the Mutuals for some games in 1871, forcing his team to forfeit a game. He also missed some games for Cleveland in 1872, leading the New York Times to label him "Old Unreliable" in 1873 and for Cleveland management to dismiss him from the team.

== Personal life ==
Wolters's family left the Netherlands for Quebec when he was a child, likely in 1848, later settling in Newark, New Jersey by 1850. He had five siblings.

Wolters was a cricket bowler before playing baseball.

Wolters died in Newark at the age of 72 of edema. He was married and had a daughter.

== See also ==
- List of Major League Baseball annual runs batted in leaders
