= White Stockings =

White Stockings may refer to:

- White Tights, also translated as White Stockings, a Russian urban legend
- Chicago Cubs, known as "Chicago White Stockings" from their conception in 1870 until 1889
- Chicago White Sox, known as "White Stockings" from 1900 until 1903
