= 1871 Boston Red Stockings season =

1871 Boston Red Stockings
- League: National Association of Professional Base Ball Players
- Ballpark: South End Grounds
- City: Boston, Massachusetts
- Record: 20–10 (.667)
- League place: 3rd
- Owners: Ivers Whitney Adams
- Managers: Harry Wright

The 1871 season was the first season of the Boston Red Stockings franchise, now known as the Atlanta Braves. They were formed in 1871 by Boston businessman and Ashburnham native Ivers Whitney Adams. The team was composed of former players of the defunct Cincinnati Red Stockings franchise, who were brought to Boston and kept the name with them. Led and managed by baseball pioneer Harry Wright, the new Boston team would join the newly formed National Association of Professional Base Ball Players for the 1871 season and finish the year in third place with a record of 20–10.

Pitcher Al Spalding started all 31 of the Red Stockings' games and led the NA with 19 wins. Catcher Cal McVey finished second in the league batting race with a .431 average. From this team, Harry Wright, Al Spalding, and shortstop George Wright have all been elected into the Baseball Hall of Fame.

== Regular season ==
=== Season standings ===
Pos	Team	Pld	W	L	T	RF	RA	RD	PCT	GB
1	Philadelphia Athletics (C)	28	21	7	0	376	266	+110	.750	—
2	Chicago White Stockings	28	19	9	0	302	241	+61	.679	2
3	Boston Red Stockings	31	20	10	1	401	303	+98	.661	2
4	Washington Olympics	32	15	15	2	310	303	+7	.500	7
5	New York Mutuals	33	16	17	0	302	313	−11	.485	7.5
6	Troy Haymakers	29	13	15	1	351	362	−11	.466	8
7	Fort Wayne Kekiongas	19	7	12	0	137	243	−106	.368	9.5
8	Cleveland Forest Citys	29	10	19	0	249	341	−92	.345	11.5
9	Rockford Forest Citys	25	4	21	0	231	287	−56	.160	15.5

Source: Baseball Reference
(C) Champions

=== Record vs. opponents ===
1871 National Association Records Sources:
Team	BOS	CHI	CLE	FW	NY	PHI	ROC	TRO	WSH
Boston	—	1–3	3–1	2–0	2–2	3–1	3–0	3–2	3–1–1
Chicago	3–1	—	2–1	2–0	3–1	2–3	3–0	1–1	3–2
Cleveland	1–3	1–2	—	0–3	3–2	0–3	3–1	2–2	0–3
Fort Wayne	0–2	0–2	3–0	—	1–2	0–2	1–1	1–1	1–2
New York	2–2	1–3	2–3	2–1	—	2–3	3–1	1–3	3–1
Philadelphia	1–3	3–2	3–0	2–0	3–2	—	3–0	3–0	3–0
Rockford	0–3	0–3	1–3	1–1	1–3	0–3	—	1–2	0–3
Troy	2–3	1–1	2–2	1–1	3–1	0–3	2–1	—	2–3–1
Washington	1–3–1	2–3	3–0	2–1	1–3	0–3	3–0	3–2–1	—

=== Roster ===
1871 Boston Red Stockings
Roster
Pitchers: Albert Spalding; Harry Wright	Catchers: Cal McVey; Infielders: Ross Barnes; Charlie Gould; Sam Jackson; Harry Schafer; George Wright	Outfielders: Frank Barrows; Dave Birdsall; Fred Cone; Harry Wright	Manager: Harry Wright

== Player stats ==
=== Batting ===
==== Starters by position ====
Note: Pos = Position; G = Games played; AB = At bats; H = Hits; Avg. = Batting average; HR = Home runs; RBI = Runs batted in

Pos	Player	G	AB	H	Avg.	HR	RBI
C	Cal McVey	29	153	66	.431	0	43
1B	Charlie Gould	31	151	43	.285	2	32
2B	Ross Barnes	31	157	63	.401	0	34
SS	George Wright	16	80	33	.413	0	11
3B	Harry Schafer	31	149	42	.282	0	28
OF	Fred Cone	19	77	20	.260	0	16
OF	Dave Birdsall	29	152	46	.303	0	24
OF	Harry Wright	31	147	44	.299	0	26

==== Other batters ====
Note: G = Games played; AB = At bats; H = Hits; Avg. = Batting average; HR = Home runs; RBI = Runs batted in

Player	G	AB	H	Avg.	HR	RBI
Frank Barrows	18	86	13	.151	0	11
Sam Jackson	16	76	17	.224	0	11

=== Pitching ===
==== Starting pitchers ====
Note: G = Games pitched; IP = Innings pitched; W = Wins; L = Losses; ERA = Earned run average; SO = Strikeouts

Player	G	IP	W	L	ERA	SO
Al Spalding	31	257.1	19	10	3.36	23

==== Relief pitchers ====
Note: G = Games pitched; IP = Innings pitched; W = Wins; L = Losses; ERA = Earned run average; SO = Strikeouts

Player	G	IP	W	L	ERA	SO
Harry Wright	9	18.2	1	0	6.27	0
