= John Boake =

American baseball umpire

- Born: John Leonsor Boake; September 24, 1841; Philadelphia, Pennsylvania, U.S.
- Died: July 22, 1912 (aged 70); Covington, Kentucky, U.S.
- Resting place: Spring Grove Cemetery
- Years active: 1871
- Known for: Umpire
- Parent(s): John and Elvira (Ball) Boake

John Leonsor "J. L." Boake (September 24, 1841 – July 22, 1912) was an American professional baseball umpire in the National Association who umpired his only game on May 4, 1871, which was the first game in professional baseball league history. Boake was the home plate umpire when the Fort Wayne Kekiongas defeated the Cleveland Forest Citys, 2–0.

He was born in Philadelphia, Pennsylvania and died in Covington, Kentucky. Boake is buried at Spring Grove Cemetery in Cincinnati, Ohio.
