= Bobby Mathews =

American baseball player (1851–1898)

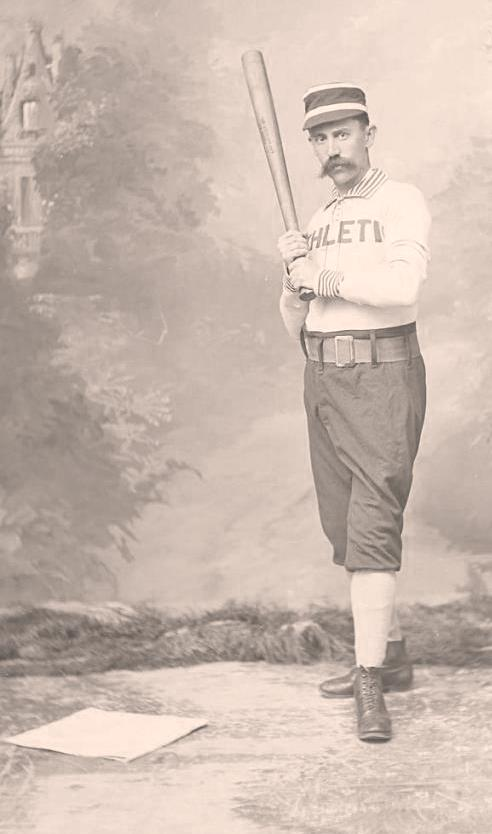
- Mathews c. 1883–1887
- Pitcher
- Born: November 21, 1851; Baltimore, Maryland, U.S.
- Died: April 17, 1898 (aged 46); Baltimore, Maryland, U.S.
- Batted: Right Threw: Right

MLB debut
- May 4, 1871, for the Fort Wayne Kekiongas

Last MLB appearance
- October 10, 1887, for the Philadelphia Athletics

MLB statistics
- Win–loss record: 297–248
- Earned run average: 2.86
- Strikeouts: 1,528
- Stats at Baseball Reference

Teams
- NAPBBP Baltimore Marylands (1869–1870) Fort Wayne Kekiongas (1871) Baltimore Canaries (1872) New York Mutuals (1873–1875) National League New York Mutuals (1876) Cincinnati Reds (1877) Providence Grays (1879, 1881) Boston Red Caps (1881–1882) American Association Philadelphia Athletics (1883–1887)

Career highlights and awards
- Won first NA game on May 4, 1871; NL champion (1879); AA champion (1883)

Robert T. Mathews (November 21, 1851 – April 17, 1898) was an American right-handed professional baseball pitcher who played in the National Association of Professional Base Ball Players, the National League of Major League Baseball and the American Association for twenty years beginning in the late 1860s. He is credited as being one of the inventors of the spitball pitch, in each of three major leagues, which was rediscovered or reintroduced to the major leagues after he died. He is also credited with the first legal pitch which broke away from the batter. He is listed at 5 feet 5 inches (1.65 m) and 140 pounds (64 kg), which is small for a pro athlete even in his time, when the average height of an American male in the mid-19th century was 5 feet 7 inches (1.70 m).

== Career ==
Mathews was born in 1851, in Baltimore, Maryland, and he played as a teenager with the Maryland club of that city, and he made the team a dangerous one. Mathews began his career at the age of 16 for the Marylands of Baltimore (a junior squad) in 1868. A year later, he moved to the senior club, and the following year the club declared themselves professional, resulting in the creation of the National Association of Base Ball Players (NAABP). On August 19, he made his first ever start in the league against the Orientals of New York, winning 28–15. For the 1871 season, he and some other Maryland players signed with the Fort Wayne Kekiongas. On May 4, 1871, in Fort Wayne, Indiana, he pitched a shutout in the inaugural game of the National Association of Professional Base Ball Players (NA), the first professional league.

Over his 16-year career, he had 297 wins, 248 losses, 525 complete games, with a career earned run average of 2.86. He had 1,528 strikeouts compared with 532 walks. He won 20 games 8 times, including 42 in 1874 with the New York Mutuals of the National Association, and is the only player to win 50 games or to pitch 100 games in each of three major leagues.

== After baseball ==
Mathews umpired a few games between 1871 and 1888 and signed with the regular staff of the Players' League in 1890, returning to the AA in 1891.

== Legacy ==
Over his 16-year career, he had 297 wins, 248 losses, 525 complete games, with a career earned run average of 2.86. He had 1,528 strikeouts compared with 532 walks. He won 20 games 8 times, including a career-high 42 in 1874 with the New York Mutuals of the National Association, and is the only player to win 50 games or to pitch 100 games in each of three major leagues. He is the 25th winningest pitcher in MLB history, yet has the most career innings pitched and the second-highest number of wins (behind Roger Clemens) for a pitcher not elected to the Baseball Hall of Fame. He is also the pitcher with the highest number of wins without reaching 300. Although he was known primarily as a pitcher (doing so for 578 games), he also played games in other positions from time to time, playing 80 games in the outfield, nine as a third baseman and two as a shortstop.

== Death ==
Mathews died in 1898 in Baltimore, at the age of 46, of paresis caused by syphilis, and is interred at New Cathedral Cemetery, also in Baltimore.

== See also ==
- List of Major League Baseball career wins leaders
- List of Major League Baseball leaders in games started
- List of Major League Baseball career innings pitched leaders
- List of Major League Baseball annual ERA leaders
- List of Major League Baseball annual saves leaders
- List of Major League Baseball annual shutout leaders
- List of Major League Baseball single-inning strikeout leaders
