= 1871 in baseball =

== Champions ==
- National Association (professional): Athletic of Philadelphia
- National Association of Amateur Base Ball Players: Star of Brooklyn, 30–13
- National Association of Junior Base Ball Players: Fly Aways

== Statistical leaders ==
National Association
Stat	Player	Total
AVG	Levi Meyerle (PHI)	.492
HR	Levi Meyerle (PHI); Lip Pike (TRO); Fred Treacey (CHI)	4
RBI	Rynie Wolters (NY)	44
W	Al Spalding (BOS)	19
ERA	George Zettlein (CHI)	2.73
K	Al Pratt (CLE)	57

== National Association final standings ==
Pos	Team	Pld	W	L	T	RF	RA	RD	PCT	GB
1	Philadelphia Athletics (C)	28	21	7	0	376	266	+110	.750	—
2	Chicago White Stockings	28	19	9	0	302	241	+61	.679	2
3	Boston Red Stockings	31	20	10	1	401	303	+98	.661	2
4	Washington Olympics	32	15	15	2	310	303	+7	.500	7
5	New York Mutuals	33	16	17	0	302	313	−11	.485	7.5
6	Troy Haymakers	29	13	15	1	351	362	−11	.466	8
7	Fort Wayne Kekiongas	19	7	12	0	137	243	−106	.368	9.5
8	Cleveland Forest Citys	29	10	19	0	249	341	−92	.345	11.5
9	Rockford Forest Citys	25	4	21	0	231	287	−56	.160	15.5

Source: Baseball Reference
(C) Champions

The tenth founding member, the National club of Washington, did not enter a team for the championship until 1872.

== Notable seasons ==
- Ross Barnes of the Boston Red Stockings concludes in the top 5 in 11 different offensive categories. He leads the NA in runs scored, total bases and times on base. He is second in on-base percentage, doubles, triples and walks. He finishes third in batting average (.401) and hits. He places 4th in slugging percentage and 5th in runs batted in.
- Rynie Wolters of the New York Mutuals leads the league in games started, complete games, and innings pitched and ties for the league lead with 1 shutout. He also leads the NA with 44 RBI while batting .370.

== Events ==
=== January–March ===
- January 20 – The Boston Base Ball Club and the Boston Red Stockings are founded and incorporated by Ivers Whitney Adams with $15,000 and the help of Harry Wright, in Boston.
- March 17 – Ten clubs establish the National Association of Professional Base Ball Players (or professional Association) in New York City.
- Later March – Thirty-three clubs establish the National Association of Amateur Base Ball Players (or amateur Association) in New York City.

=== April–June ===
- May 4 – In the first major league game ever played, the National Association begins play at Kekionga Ball Grounds in Fort Wayne, Indiana, with Forest City of Cleveland visiting the Kekiongas of Fort Wayne. Fort Wayne wins 2–0 behind the pitching of Bobby Mathews, the lowest scoring game of the season. Deacon White gets the first hit, while Joe McDermott, who will only have 11 hits and four runs batted in his career, drives in the first run in professional baseball history with a single in the second inning, scoring Bill Lennon. In the seventh inning, Lennon also became the first catcher in major league history to throw a runner out trying to steal second. Neither McDermott, Lennon, nor even the Kekiongas would finish the season.
- May 6 – Future Hall of Famer Cap Anson makes his professional debut with the Rockford Forest Citys.
- May 8 – Ezra Sutton of the Cleveland Forest Citys hits the first home run in professional baseball history in the fourth inning against the Chicago White Stockings. For good measure, Sutton adds a second home run in the seventh inning, but Cleveland falls to the White Stockings, 14–12.
- May 9 – Esteban Enrique Bellán becomes the first Hispanic player in Major League Baseball history. The 21-year-old Cuban infielder will play as Steve Bellan for the Troy Haymakers of the National Association.
- May 20 – In Boston, Mort Rogers introduces a scorecard with a picture of Harry Wright on the front. Each Red Stockings home game would feature a different player so that spectators could collect them and have a full set of Boston's players by season's end. This marketing strategy would be used throughout the 19th century and would ultimately evolve into Tobacco cards and, eventually, Baseball cards.
- May 25 – Lip Pike of the Troy Haymakers collects six hits in a 25–10 victory over the New York Mutuals.
- June 1 – Opening their National Association season, The Mutuals beat the Forest City club of Rockford, Illinois 7–3 before 2,000 at Union Grounds in Brooklyn.
- June 19 – The Fort Wayne Kekiongas, leading the Troy Haymakers 6–3 after six innings at Troy, refuse to allow another ball to be used after the game ball becomes ripped because of the reputation of the Haymakers using illegal balls in the past. The umpire (Isaac Leroy or Ed Tighe depending on the source), after five full minutes of ordering Fort Wayne back on the field, calls the game a 9–0 forfeit in favor of the Haymakers.
- June 28 – In an era of high scoring games being the norm, the Philadelphia Athletics defeat the Troy Haymakers by the amazing score of 49–33. Both pitchers go the distance in the four-hour slugfest in which both teams score in each inning, to set the highest-scoring contest in National Association history. The 42 hits made by the Athletics, including a 7-for-7 day by John Radcliff and 6-for-8 performances by Al Reach and Levi Meyerle, is also a league record.

=== July–September ===
- July 3 – The New York Mutuals lose at Troy 37–16. Even though it is customary to allow the visiting team to choose which ball to use, Troy captain Bill Craver refuses to play unless their ball is used. Heated words are exchanged throughout, with the Mutuals even being threatened with bats. Mutuals captain Bob Ferguson is convinced the ball used is not legal. This game will set the stage for the rematch on July 13 at the Union Grounds in Brooklyn.
- July 6 – The first game between a black team and a white team is played as the black Uniques defeat the white Alerts 17–16 in Chicago.
- July 10 – Albert Spalding is relieved by Harry Wright in the Boston Red Stockings 21–12 victory over the Rockford Forest Citys after both Boston catchers develop sore hands from Spalding's fast pitching.
- July 13 – Brooklyn police are forced to draw their firearms to stop the crowd from attacking the Troy Haymakers following several altercations between the Haymakers and the New York Mutuals players and officials after Troy's 9–7 win over the Mutuals.
- August 9 – Ned Connors, first baseman for the Troy Haymakers, records 20 putouts in a 9-inning 10–7 loss to the Brooklyn Eckfords.
- August 21 – The amateur champion Star Club of Brooklyn beats the Northwest amateur champion Aetnas of Chicago 4–3 in Chicago as Star pitcher Candy Cummings drives in the winning run in the 9th inning.
- August 29 – The Brooklyn Eckfords replace the Fort Wayne Kekiongas in the NA after the Kekiongas lose most of their players to defection and expulsion. Fort Wayne's unplayed games will be declared forfeits in the official standings. The Eckfords will officially join the National Association for the 1872 season.
- September 5 – Charlie Gould of the Boston Red Stockings hits the first grand slam in professional baseball history in a 6–3 victory over the Chicago White Stockings.

=== October–December ===
- October 9 – As the Rockford Forest Citys approach Chicago, they see the city in flames from the Great Chicago Fire, turn around and go home. The Chicago White Stockings' stadium is burned to the ground along with all of their uniforms and equipment.
- October 18 – The New York Mutuals, with their only pitcher Rynie Wolters sick, are forced to use a non-rostered position player, Frank Fleet, as pitcher in a crucial game for the pennant against the Philadelphia Athletics. The Mutuals are battered 21–7 by the Athletics which eliminates the Boston Red Stockings from the championship.
- October 30 – The Athletics of Philadelphia defeat the Chicago White Stockings in Brooklyn 4–1 to clinch the first professional baseball championship.

== Births ==
- March 16 – Bill Bernhard
- March 19 – Joe McGinnity
- May 30 – Amos Rusie
- June 6 – Bill Lange
- July 15 – Dan McGann
- August 13 – Fielder Jones
- September 21 – George Blackburn
- October 24 – Louis Sockalexis
- October 24 – Heinie Smith
- October 25 – Martin Bergen
- October 30 – Buck Freeman
- November 3 – Fred Hayner
- November 26 – Fred Tenney
- December 9 – Joe Kelley
- December 23 – Sam Leever
