= Fort Wayne Kekiongas =

The Fort Wayne Kekiongas were a professional baseball team, notable for winning the first professional league game on May 4, 1871. Though based in Fort Wayne, they were usually listed in game reports as simply "Kekionga" or "the Kekiongas", per the style of the day. "Fort Wayne Kekiongas" is modern nomenclature.

Kekionga - pronounced KEY-key-awn-guh - is the name of Chief Little Turtle's Miami Indian settlement where the St. Joseph River and the St. Marys River join to form the Maumee River. This was the largest settlement of the Miami tribe. General "Mad" Anthony Wayne erected Fort Wayne at that same confluence, and the modern city of Fort Wayne, Indiana grew up around the fort. In the language of the Miami tribe, kekionga means Blackberry Patch.

== Pre-National Association ==
=== Origins ===
In April 1862, several young men gathered in Fort Wayne, Indiana, to form the Summit City Club to play baseball. Banker Allen Hamilton donated land between major thoroughfares Calhoun and Clinton Street, south of Lewis Street, for a ball field.

=== 1866 ===
Play was short-lived, as members enlisted in the Union army, some dying in the war. The club reorganized in 1866, and a second team, the Kekionga Base Ball Club of Fort Wayne, was formed that year as well.

The first game of the 1866 schedule saw the Kekiongas win against the Enterprise of Sydney by a score of 54–34. The game was played in Sydney on 24 August 1866 with a time of 3 hours and 40 minutes. Charles Taylor and John Evans each hit a home run for the Kekiongas. Diehl was captain for this game. The club sent a challenge to "the champion club of the state", who were based in La Porte, Indiana for a match on 18 Sep 1866, but no results were recorded.

The Kekiongas defeated a local rival by a score of 66–40. The game was played in Fort Wayne in Oct, 1866. The Kekiongas second baseman, Lumbard, hit two home runs while the shortstop Bell hit one home run. John Hoagland was captain for this game. On 9 Nov, 1866, the Kekiongas played the last game of their season against the same Summit City ballclub, winning 80–29. Kekiongas hit twelve home runs during the game, with Bell accounting for four and Hoagland, Hadden, F.A. Gorham, Lumbard, Aveline, Diehl, C. Gorham and Shoaff each contributing one. Aveline was awarded a "huge cigar" for making the fewest outs while scoring the most runs (0 outs, 11 runs).

1866 Fort Wayne Kekiongas
Roster
Pitchers: Diehl (if/of); George Hadden (if); Catchers: John R Hoagland	Infielders: Aveline; Bell; John Evans; F.A. Gorham; James Hoagland; Lumbard; Robert Milliman (of)	Outfielders: Charles Gorham; Charles F Taylor; Casper Miller; C. Shoaff	Captain: Diehl; John R Hoagland

=== 1867 ===
The following year, they played several games during 1867, touring around the upper Midwest. Frank H. Wolke, who served as a non-player with the club, was the Vice President of the 1867 State Base Ball Convention in Indianapolis, Indiana. George Mayers also attended the conference and was chosen captain of a team composed of other conference attendees. The team played another club named the Westerns and lost, 50–8. The "Picked Nine" cited unfamiliarity with their teammates for their defeat.

The first game of the schedule was an exhibition of the Kekiongas First Nine versus their Second Nine in July 1867. The First Nine topped the Second Nine by a score of 54–45. The Kekiongas were hosted by the Toledo, Ohio ballclub on 25 Jul 1867. Rather than treat other teams as opponents, clubs would often go to great lengths to extend graciousness and hospitality to their rivals. The two clubs dined together the night before the game and one of the members of the Toledo club arranged for a private train car for the Kekiongas' return trip. Players F.A. Gorham and Charles Gorham drafted an announcement for the Fort Wayne Daily Gazette publicly lauding the Toledo club.

Toledo visited Fort Wayne on 22 Aug 1867, results were not recorded.

Kekiongas played Kendallville, Indiana, in early Sep 1867, with Kekiongas winning after the Fort Wayne players, described as "turbulent and rowdy" by the Kendallville Standard, argued with the umpire after the third inning. In the opinion of the Kendallville newspaper, the umpire then "favored the Fort Wayne Club in every instance, and giving a number of most outrageous and unjust decisions." The Fort Wayne newspaper refers to Kendallville bragging after a victory against the Kekiongas earlier in the year.

On 10 Sep 1867, the Fort Wayne Daily Gazette published a letter from "a member of the Kendallville baseball club" which displays contemporary insults during the early American Civil War. The editor published the letter spellatim et literatim, which was derivative of the Latin verbatim et literatim meaning word-for-word. In this case, the editor wanted the readers to know that the incorrect spelling was from the original letter.

...but it were not a Ball Play, the game Played there were played by Some Outsiders. the Fort Wayne Democrat called them Gentlemen, but if they associate with him, we would like to no if he is a Gentleman. O, Shame Democrat. We did not thing you would associate with Such Low Vagabonds, Scape Gallowses, and Pickpockets, Gamblers and Hellish Looking Specimens of humanity as they are. Mr. Democrat Said that if the Keyiongas could not beat us playing the would whip us, that is nice talk for an Editor of a Copperhead Papper did you thing about fiting when Our Country were about to be destroyed by Some of your Brethren in the South, you would Like perhaps to get the game fought out by some others, and you would stop at your Cheese Press and Blow, all wee ask is for you to keep your blubber head Shut and not disturb yourself About the B.B. affairs, and if you are a Jentleman for God Sake Place it in your Local So that Others ma See Some of your Wonderous Works up here.

Fort Wayne hosted a team from Peru, Indiana, and defeated them 23–7 in six innings on 9 Sep 1867. Charles Gorham hit a home run for the Kekiongas. The Empires were hosted by Kekiongas on 5 Oct 1867 with Kekiongas winning 37–6. No home runs were recorded for Fort Wayne.

1866 Fort Wayne Kekiongas
Roster
Pitchers: Cassidy; Catchers: George J E Mayers (p); Woodworth	Infielders: Aveline; Bramble; Diehl; Fisher; F.H. Gorham; Hartman; Moderwell; Rumsey; Towne; Wheeler (c)	Outfielders: Craw; Fowler; Charles D Gorham; Lumbard (if); Casper Miller; Robert L Milliman; Singleton; Stophlet; Charles F Taylor	Captain: Charles D Gorham

=== 1869 ===
The Kekiongas played the Cincinnati Red Stockings twice in 1869. The Red Stockings were the first baseball team in the US to have all paid players, and went $16,000 in debt ($387,000 in 2025 dollars) to do so. Cincinnati won the first game 86–8, but as Fort Wayne had improved over the summer, they only achieved a 41–7 victory in the second contest. The 1869 Red Stockings ended up with 57 victories and one tie for the season.

=== 1870 ===
The following summer, the Maryland Club of Baltimore broke up in mid-season, and the Kekiongas recruited their best players, including pitcher Bobby Mathews, who is credited with having invented the spitball and being the first master of the curveball. When the team played the Chicago White Sox later that season, the Chicago fans were so humiliated that they threw rocks at Fort Wayne players, injuring several of them.

== 1871 National Association ==
The National Association of Professional Base Ball Players was formed in New York City in 1871. In addition to the Kekiongas, the other teams were based in Philadelphia, Chicago, Boston, Washington, D.C., Troy, New York, New York City, Cleveland, Ohio, and Rockford, Illinois. Each team was to play a best-3-of-5 series with each other team, and the best team would be able to fly a pennant for a year. The franchise fee for each team was $10. Season tickets, or "Subscriptions" for the Kekiongas sold for $5 in 1871, and allowed entry to games for two people.

=== First game ===
The honor of playing the first game of the newly organized National Association of Professional Base Ball Players was decided by coin flip.

The game was played at the Kekionga Ball Grounds. Bobby Mathews, 5'5", 140 lbs, and 20 years old, hurled a 2–0 shutout for the Kekiongas. Deacon White, catcher for the Cleveland Forest Citys got 3 hits in 4 at-bats; the other Cleveland players only shared 2 hits among them. Deacon White scored the first hit, the first extra-base hit (a double) and was the first to hit into a double-play.

The game was rained out in the top of the 9th inning. Attendance was 200, and the umpire was John Boake.

Bobby Mathews, who went on to play five seasons each in the National Association, National League, and American Association, is the only player ever to pitch 100 games or to win at least 50 in three different major leagues. He is credited with inventing the spitball and the out-curve. Deacon White was another historic player, ending his 22-year career as playing owner of Buffalo's Brotherhood team.

== Early baseball nomenclature ==
Although the team is conventionally called the "Fort Wayne Kekiongas", using the modern context of a city name plus a nickname, the actual name of the team was "Kekionga" and was so listed in standings, rather than "Fort Wayne".

== Half a season ==
The community raised funds and erected a grandstand at Kekionga Base Ball Grounds, located on the former Union Army training grounds, Camp Allen. The grandstand was called "The Grand Dutchess" because of its lavish construction. (The publication Batter Up refers to the grandstand as the Grand Dutchess, not the Old Dutchess. It is also called the Grand Dutchess in Twentieth Century History of Fort Wayne, by John Ankenbruck and in an article in the Fort Wayne Daily Sentinel, November 6, 1871.) Some sources give "Grand Duchess" as the name of the ballfield itself, but contemporary records contradict this.The Grand Duchess burned to the ground on November 5, 1871. By the time the fire department arrived, the fire had too great a start to salvage the grandstand.

Paid attendance was poor, and players were poorly paid, or not at all. A number of homesick players from Baltimore returned home. By mid-season, the team had fallen apart, and the last game was played on August 29, giving the Kekiongas 7 wins for the year. The team was managed by Bill Lennon for the first 14 games, then Harry Deane for the final five. The Grand Duchess burned to the ground on November 5, 1871.

Leading the offense for the Kekiongas was first-baseman James H. "Jim" Foran, who hit .348. Only 23 at the time, he had previously played third-base for the Philadelphia Athletics. He never again played professional baseball, and died at the age of 80 in Los Angeles.

Bobby Mathews won 6 and lost 11 games for the Kekiongas. He played five years in each of three different major leagues, and is the only player ever to win over 50 games in each of the major leagues. Bobby Mathews won 42 games in 1874 for the New York Mutuals (National Association).

== See also ==
- History of sports in Fort Wayne, Indiana
- Retrosheet

== Sources ==
- Pictorial History of Fort Wayne, Indiana by Bert J. Griswold, published 1917 by Robert O. Law
- Batter Up: Fort Wayne's Baseball History by Robert D. Parker in Old Fort News, Summer, 1967.
- Twentieth Century History of Fort Wayne by John Ankenbruck, published 1975 by Twentieth Century Historical Fort Wayne, Inc.
