= 1873 Baltimore Marylands season =

1873 Baltimore Marylands
- League: National Association of Professional Base Ball Players
- Ballpark: Madison Avenue Grounds
- City: Baltimore, Maryland
- Record: 0–6 (.000)
- League place: 9th
- Manager: Bill Smith

The Baltimore Marylands played their first and only season in 1873 as a member of the National Association of Professional Base Ball Players. They finished ninth in the league with a record of 0–6 before the team dropped out of the Association and folded.

== Regular season ==
=== Season standings ===
National Association	W	L	GB	Pct.
Boston Red Stockings	43	16	–	.729
Philadelphia White Stockings	36	17	4.0	.679
Baltimore Canaries	34	22	7.5	.607
New York Mutuals	29	24	11.0	.547
Philadelphia Athletics	28	23	11.0	.549
Brooklyn Atlantics	17	37	23.5	.205
Washington Blue Legs	8	31	25.0	.205
Elizabeth Resolutes	2	21	23.0	.087
Baltimore Marylands	0	6	16.5	.000

=== Record vs. opponents ===
1873 National Association Records Sources:
Team	BC	BM	BOS	BR	EL	NY	PHA	PWS	WSH
Baltimore Canaries	—	4–0	2–7–1	7–2	3–0	6–3	3–4	3–6	6–0
Baltimore Marylands	0–4	—	0–0	0–0	0–0	0–0	0–0	0–0	0–2
Boston	7–2–1	0–0	—	8–1	4–1	6–3	4–5	5–4	9–0
Brooklyn	2–7	0–0	1–8	—	3–1	2–7	4–5–1	2–7	3–2
Elizabeth	0–3	0–0	1–4	1–3	—	0–4	0–2	0–4	0–1
New York	3–6	0–0	3–6	7–2	4–0	—	4–5	4–4	4–1
Philadelphia Athletics	4–3	0–0	5–4	5–4–1	2–0	5–4	—	1–8	6–0
Philadelphia White Stockings	6–3	0–0	4–5	7–2	4–0	4–4	8–1	—	3–2
Washington	0–6	2–0	0–9	2–3	1–0	1–4	0–6	2–3	—

=== Roster ===
1873 Baltimore Marylands
Roster
Pitchers: McDoolan; Frank Sellman; Ed Stratton	Infielders: Wally Goldsmith; Henry Kohler; Bill Lennon; Lou Say; Marty Simpson; John Smith; Red Woodhead	Outfielders: Frederick Ehlen; Bill French; Mike Hooper; Tommy Johns; Levin Jones; John Sheppard; Bill Smith; Utility: Joe Kernan; George Popplein	Manager: Bill Smith

== Player stats ==
=== Batting ===
Note: G = Games played; AB = At bats; H = Hits; Avg. = Batting average; HR = Home runs; RBI = Runs batted in

Player	G	AB	H	Avg.	HR	RBI
Bill Lennon	5	19	4	.211	0	2
Marty Simpson	4	15	2	.133	0	2
John Smith	5	19	2	.105	0	1
Henry Kohler	6	25	3	.120	0	1
John Sheppard	3	11	0	.000	0	0
Mike Hooper	3	14	3	.214	0	2
Bill Smith	6	23	4	.174	0	1
Bill French	5	18	4	.222	0	1
Lou Say	3	12	2	.167	0	2
Joe Kernan	2	8	3	.375	0	1
Red Woodhead	1	5	0	.000	0	0
Levin Jones	1	4	3	.750	0	1
George Popplein	1	4	0	.000	0	0
Tommy Johns	1	4	0	.000	0	0
Wally Goldsmith	1	4	0	.000	0	0
Frederick Ehlen	1	3	0	.000	0	0

=== Starting pitchers ===
Note: G = Games pitched; IP = Innings pitched; W = Wins; L = Losses; ERA = Earned run average; SO = Strikeouts

Player	G	IP	W	L	ERA	SO
Ed Stratton	3	27.0	0	3	8.83	0
Frank Sellman	1	9.0	0	1	8.00	0
McDoolan	1	9.0	0	1	3.00	0
Bill French	1	9.0	0	1	12.00	0
