= List of athletes from Maryland A – M =

A number of notable amateur and professional athletes are from Maryland, including Cal Ripken Jr., Michael Phelps and Babe Ruth.

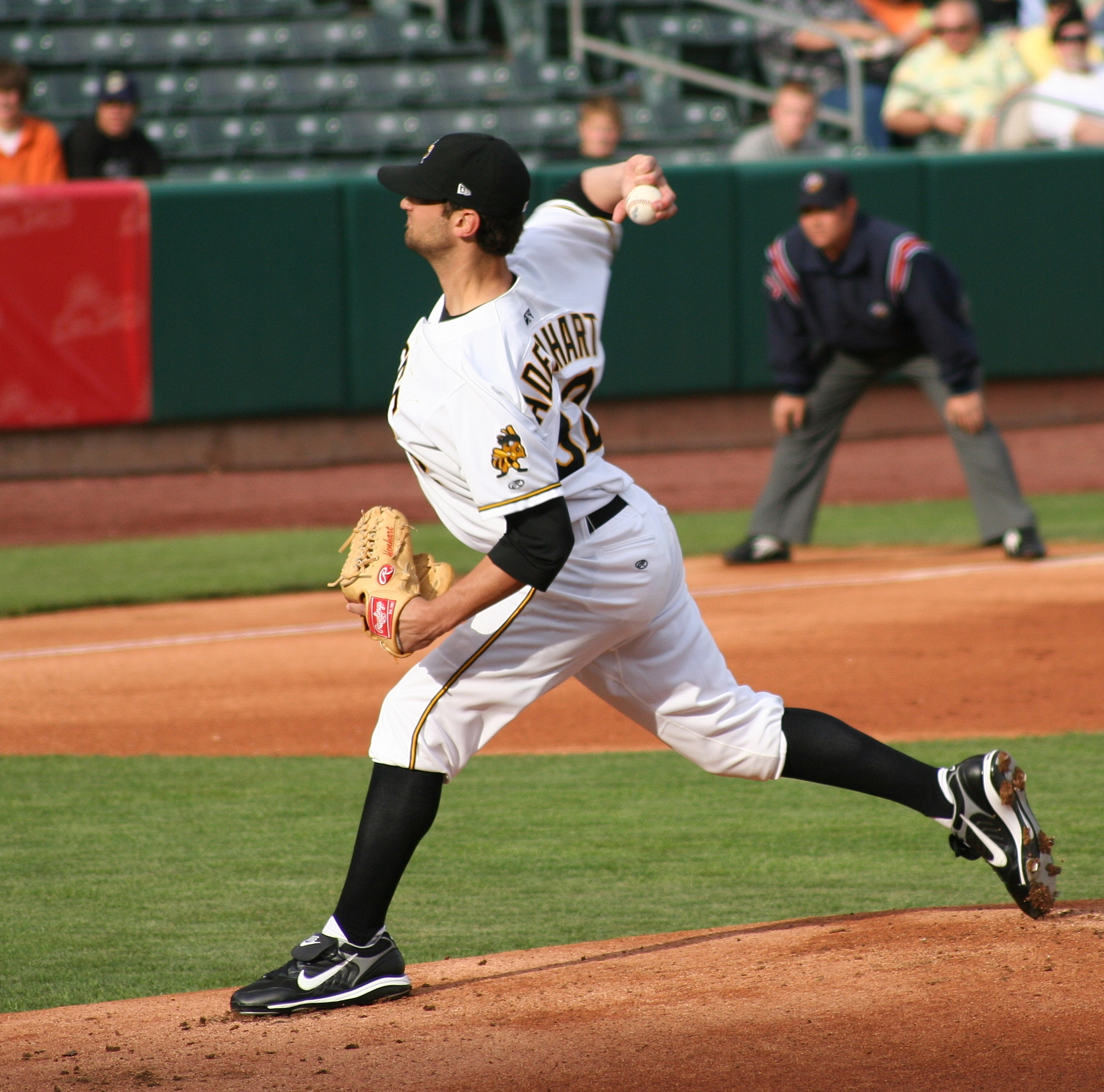
Nick Adenhart, native of Silver Spring, Maryland

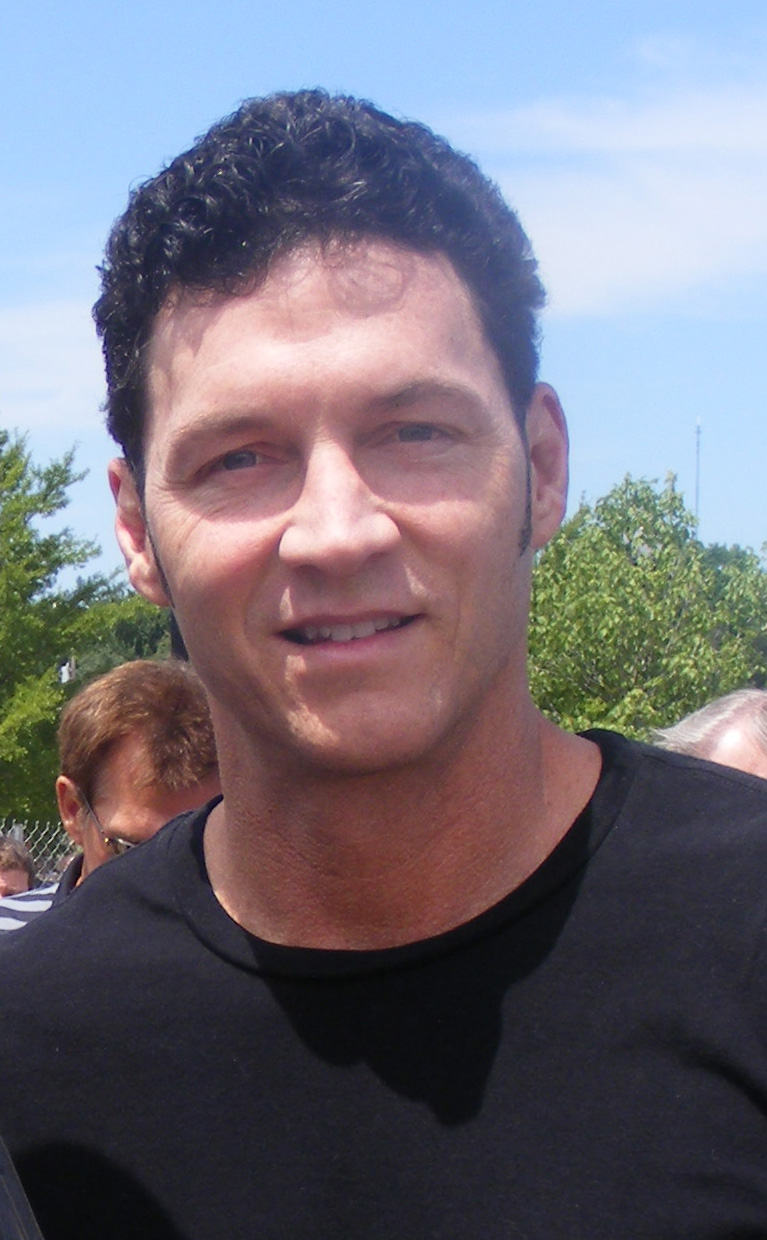
Brady Anderson, native of Silver Spring, Maryland

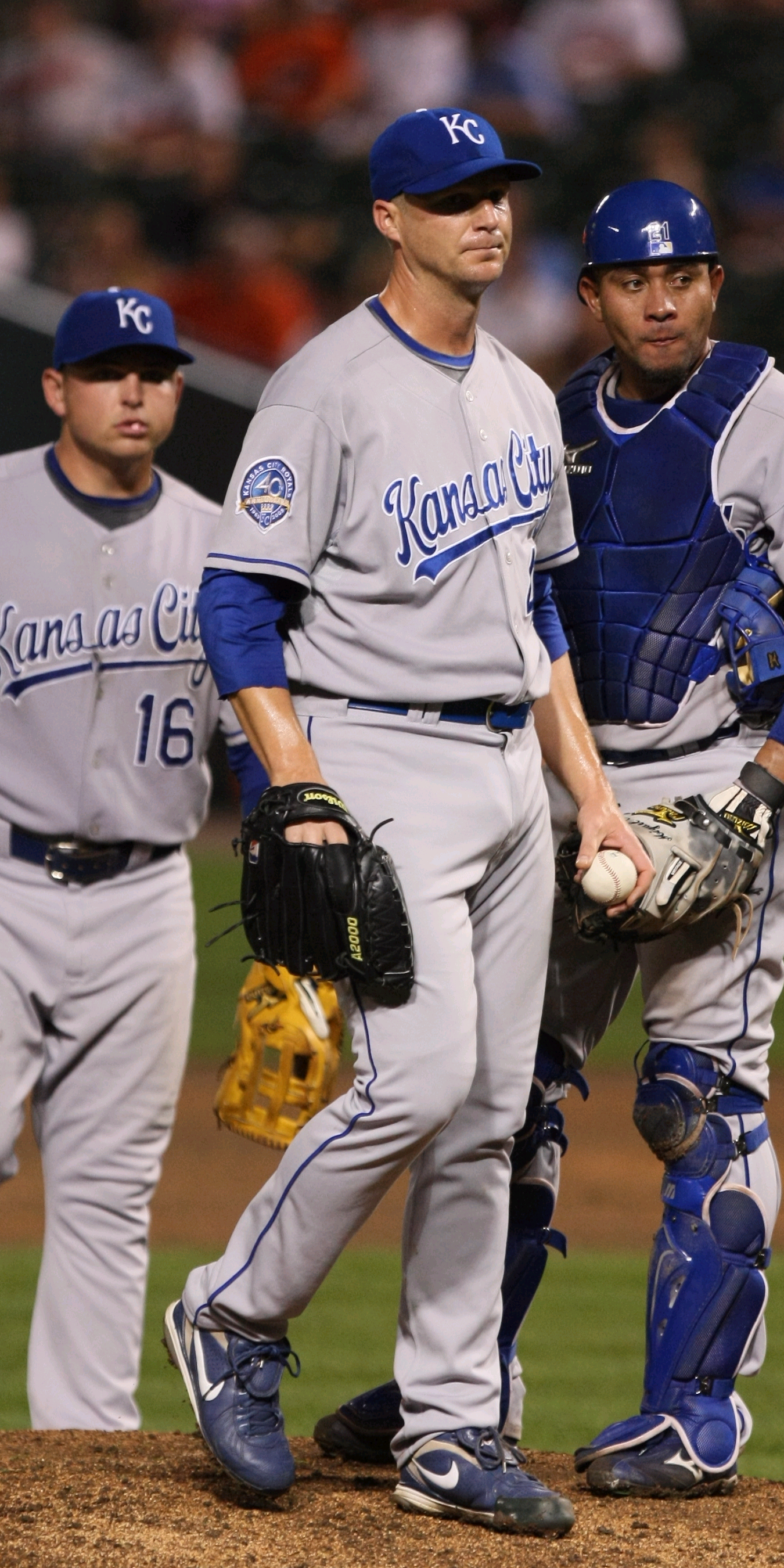
John Bale, native of Cheverly, Maryland

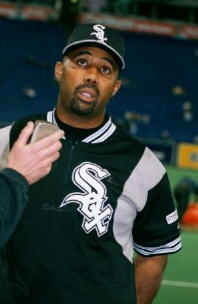
Harold Baines, native of Easton, Maryland

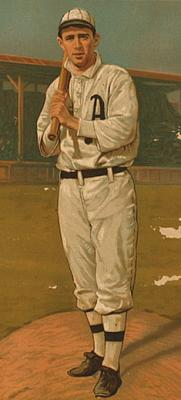
John Franklin "Home Run" Baker, native of Trappe, Maryland and member of Baseball Hall of Fame

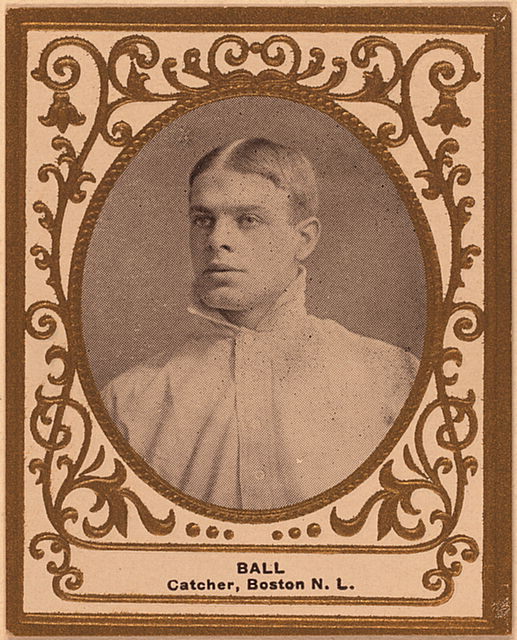
Jim Ball, native of Harford County, Maryland

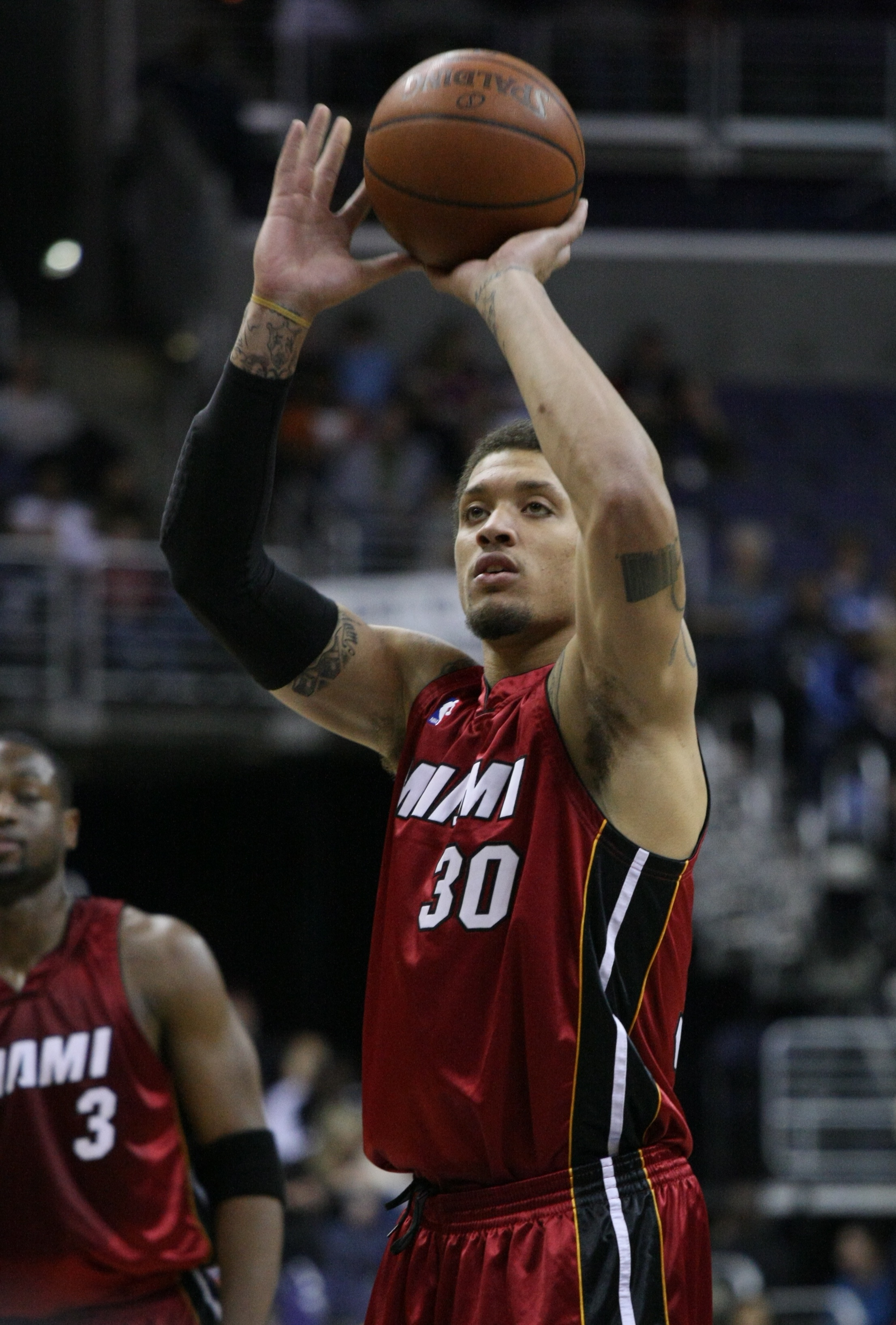
Michael Beasley, native of Frederick, Maryland

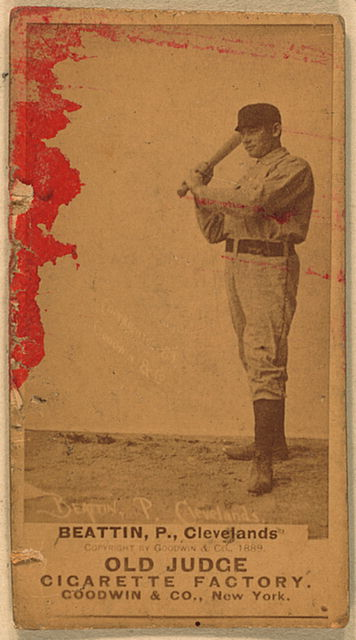
Ed Beatin, native of Baltimore, Maryland

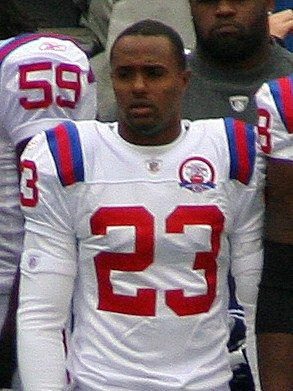
Leigh Bodden, native of Hyattsville, Maryland

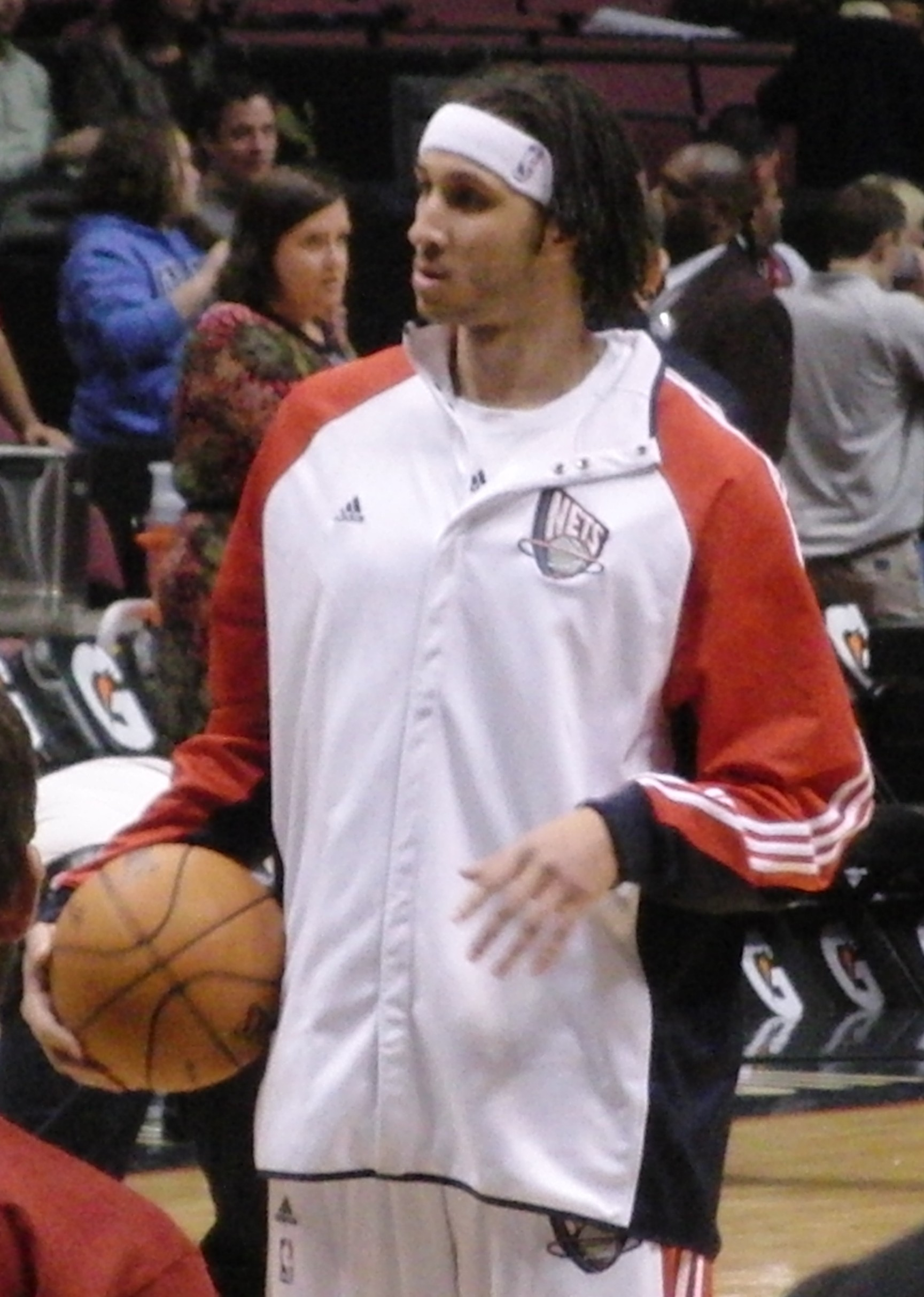
Josh Boone, native of Mount Airy, Maryland

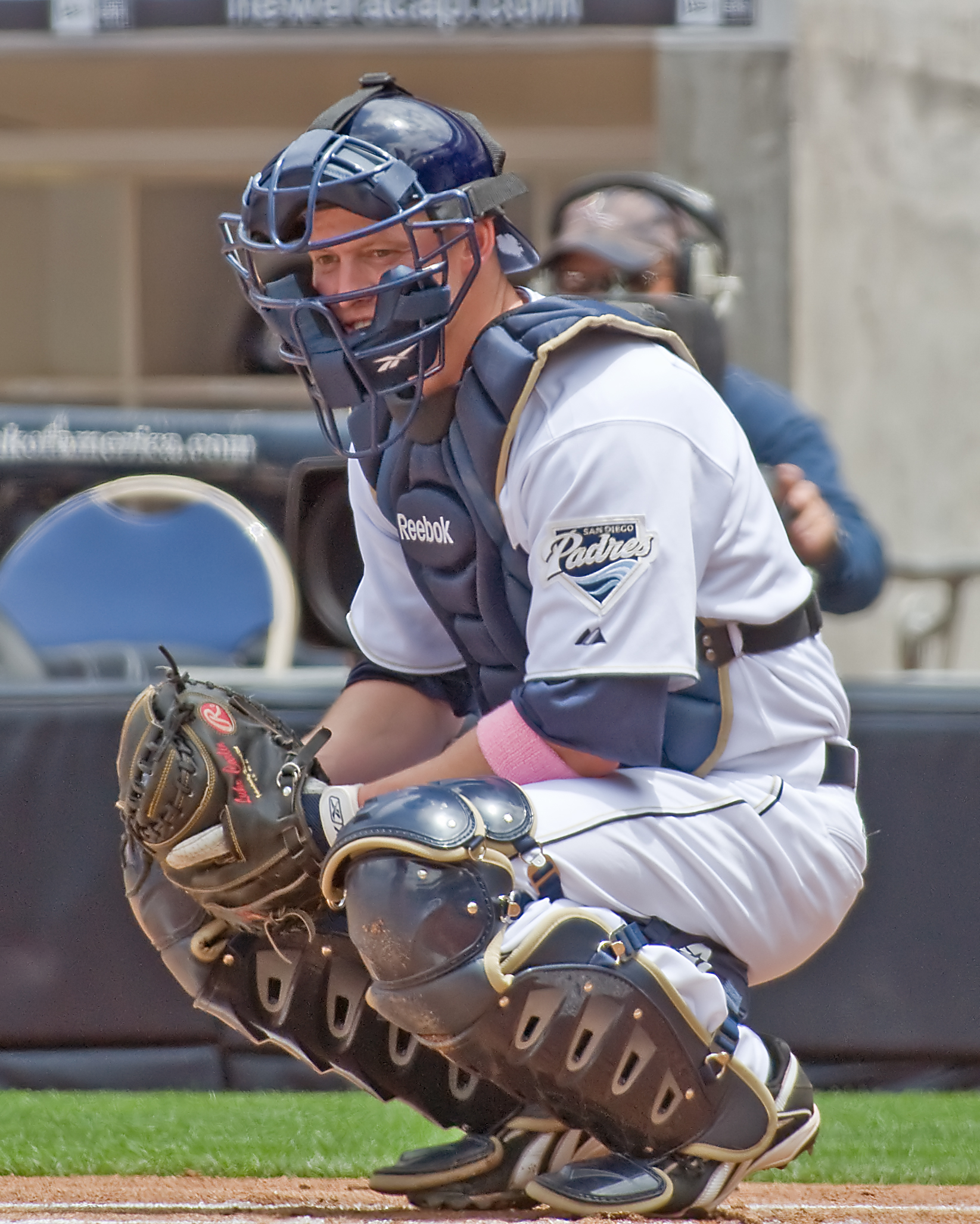
Luke Carlin, native of Silver Spring, Maryland

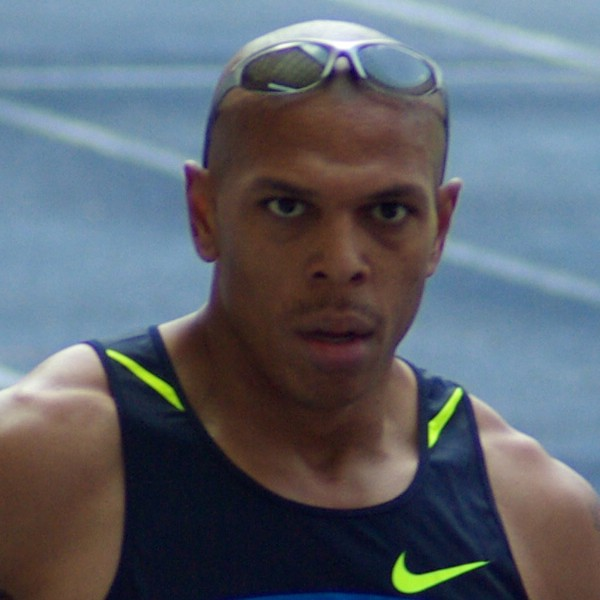
James Carter, native of Baltimore, Maryland

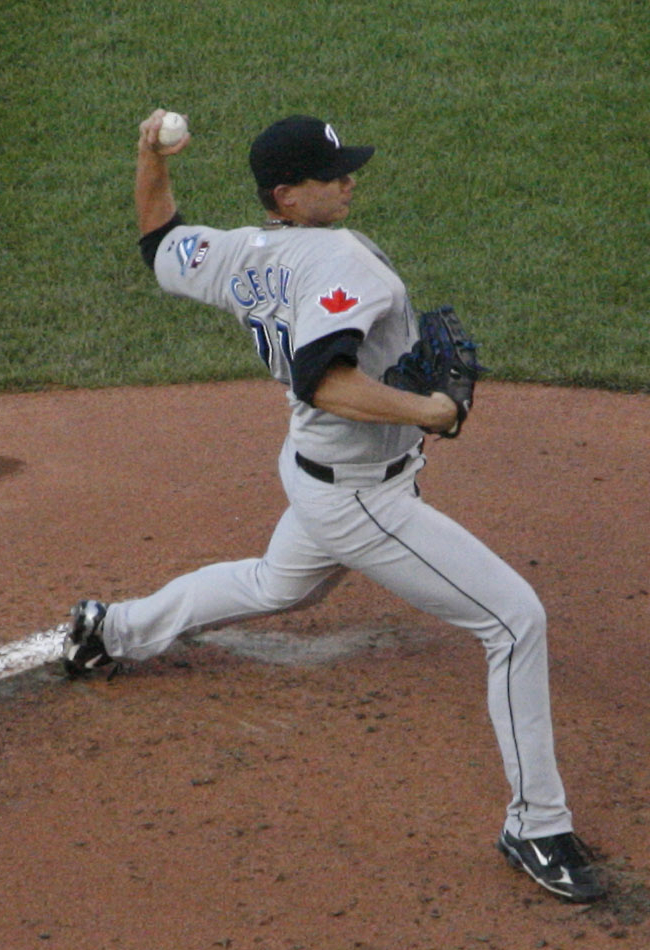
Brett Cecil, native of Dunkirk, Maryland

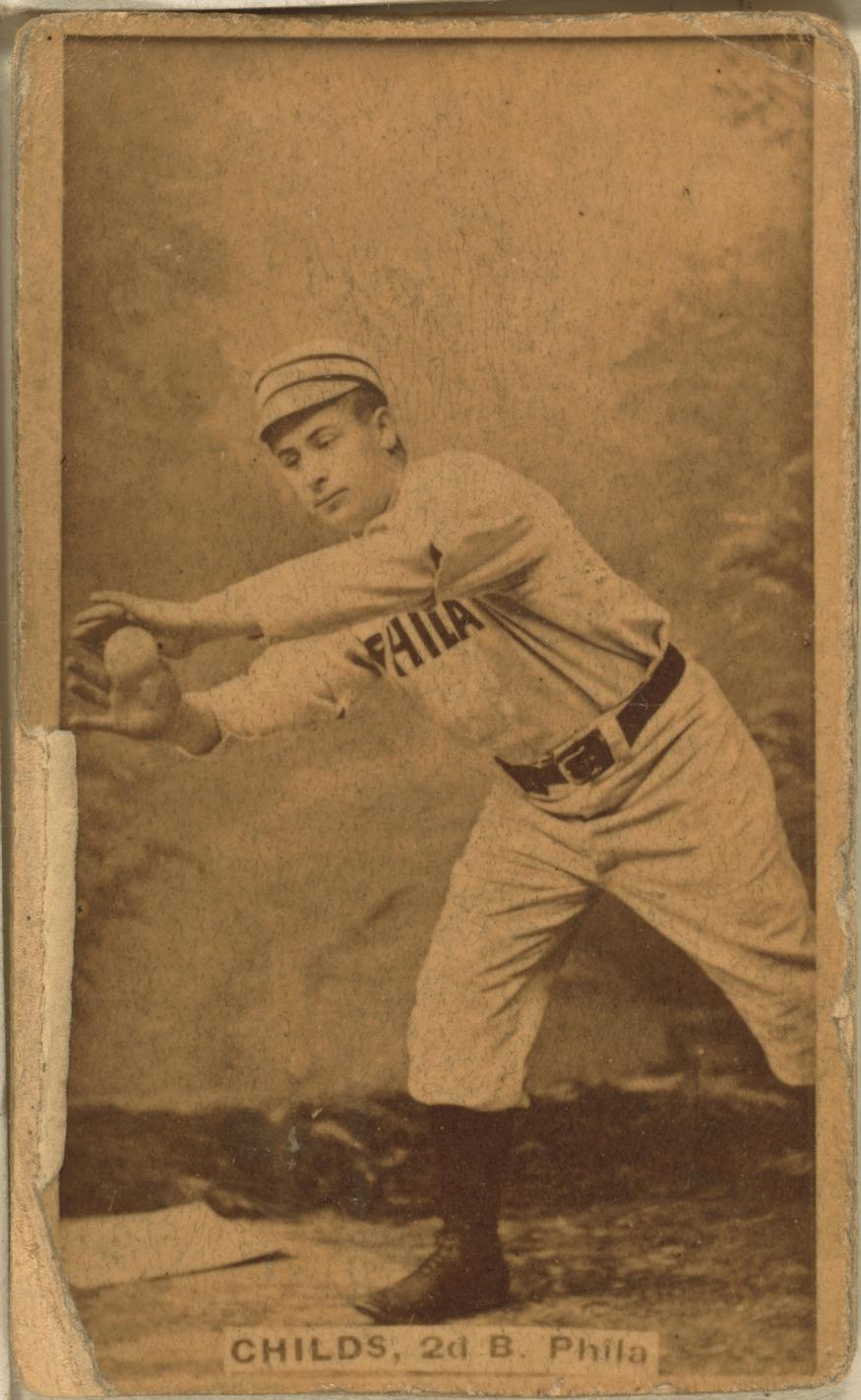
Cupid Childs, native of Calvert County, Maryland

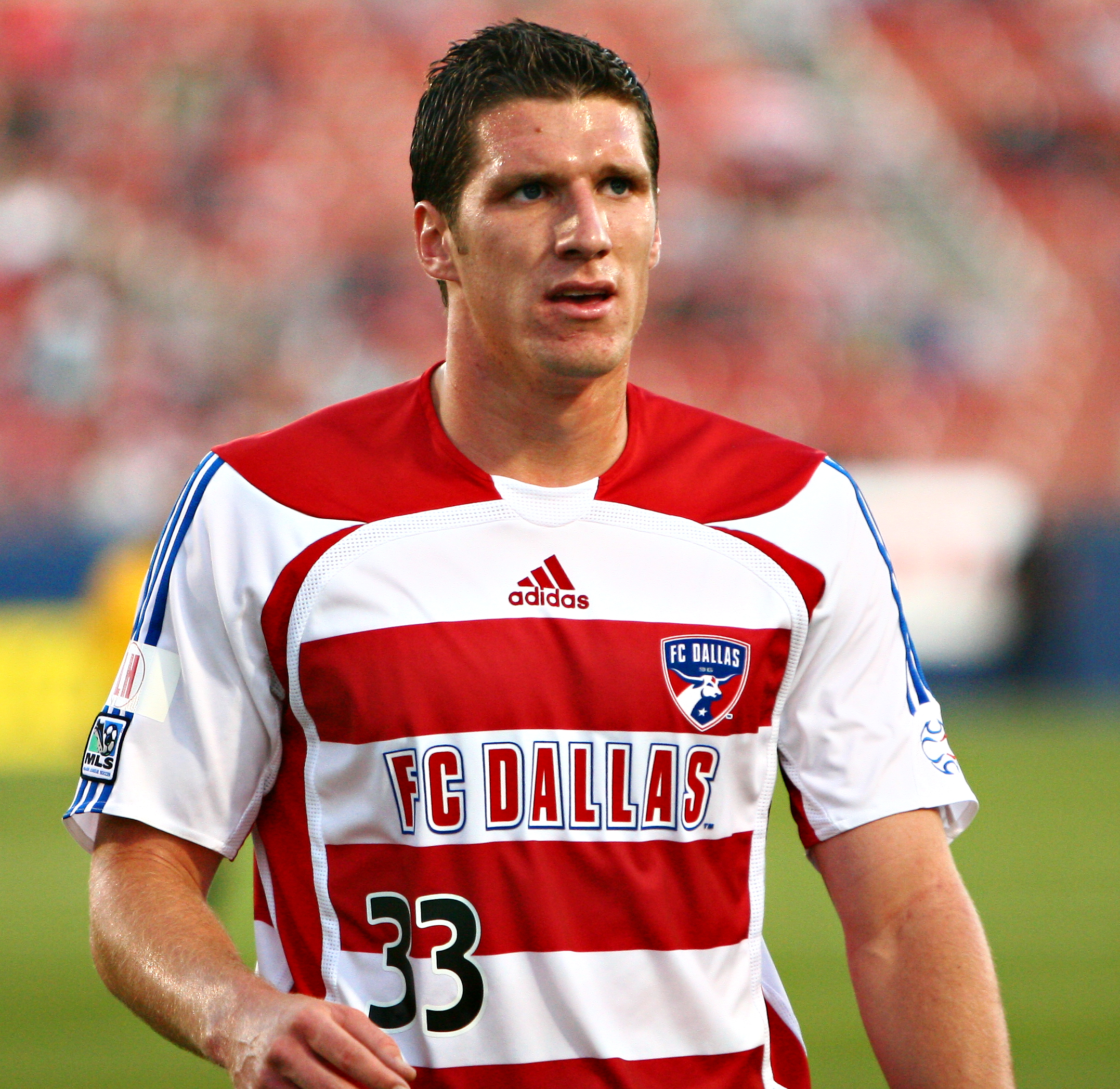
Kenny Cooper, native of Baltimore, Maryland

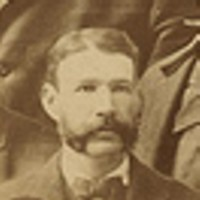
Hugh Daily, native of Baltimore, Maryland

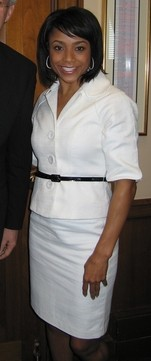
Dominique Dawes, native of Silver Spring, Maryland and Olympic gold medalist

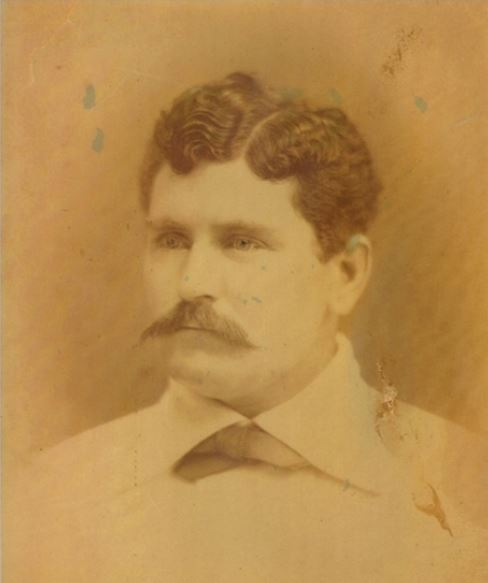
Buttercup Dickerson, native of Tyaskin, Maryland

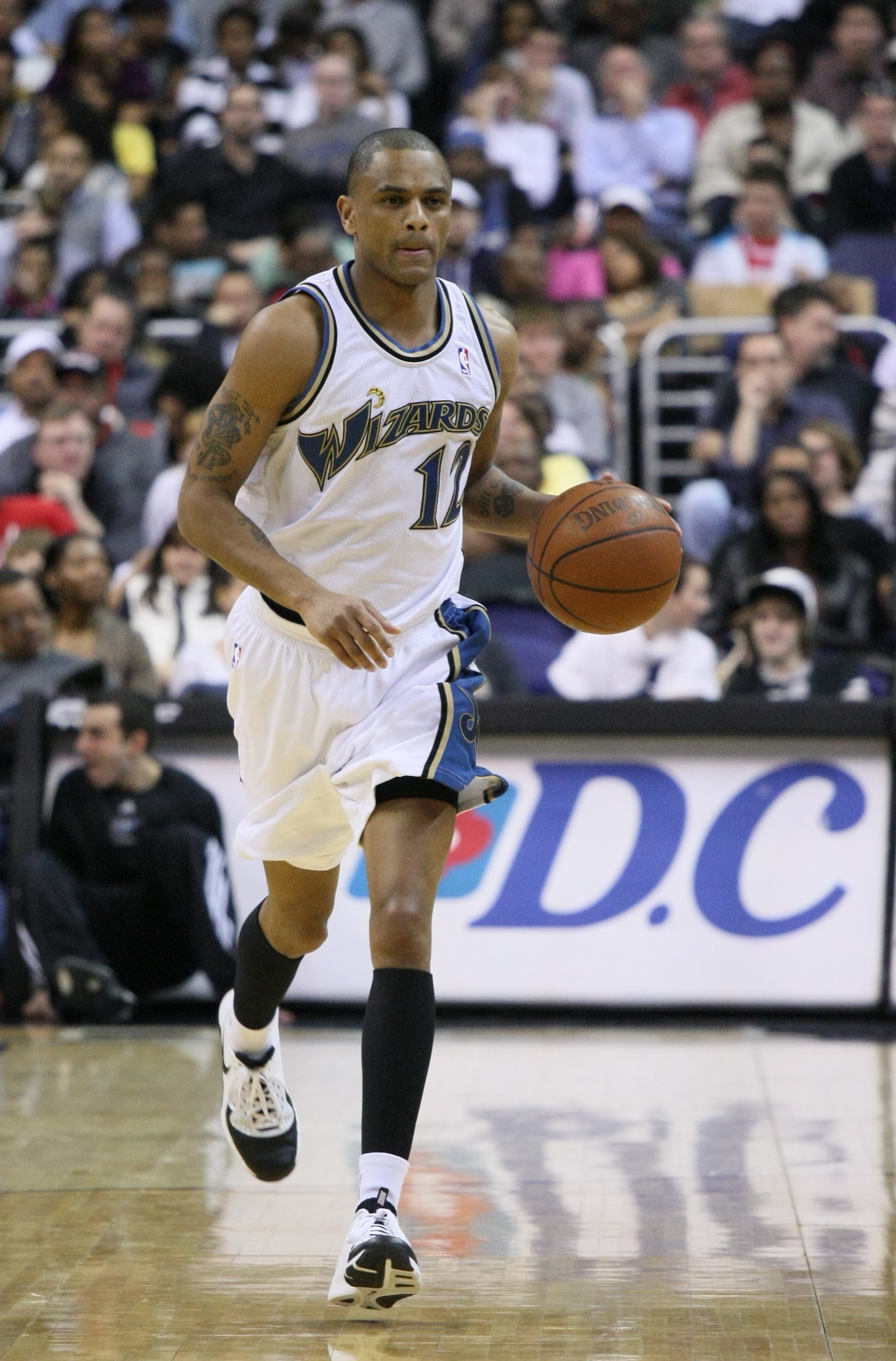
Juan Dixon, native of Baltimore, Maryland

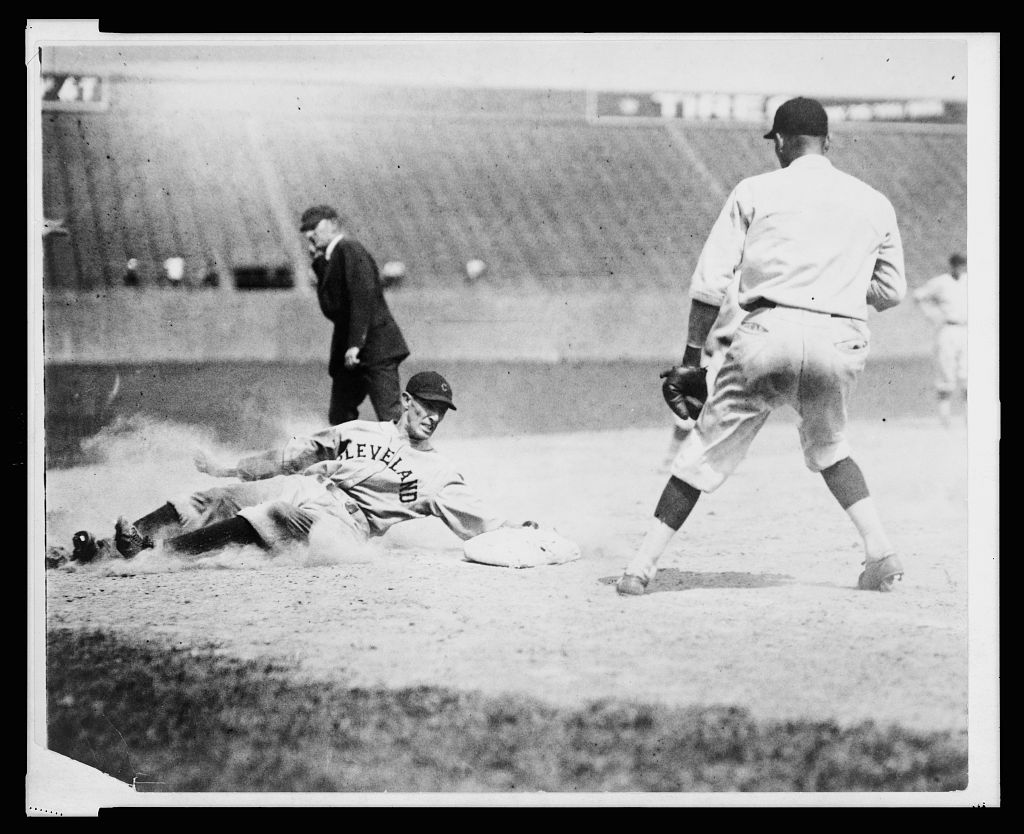
Chick Fewster, native of Baltimore, Maryland sliding into third base

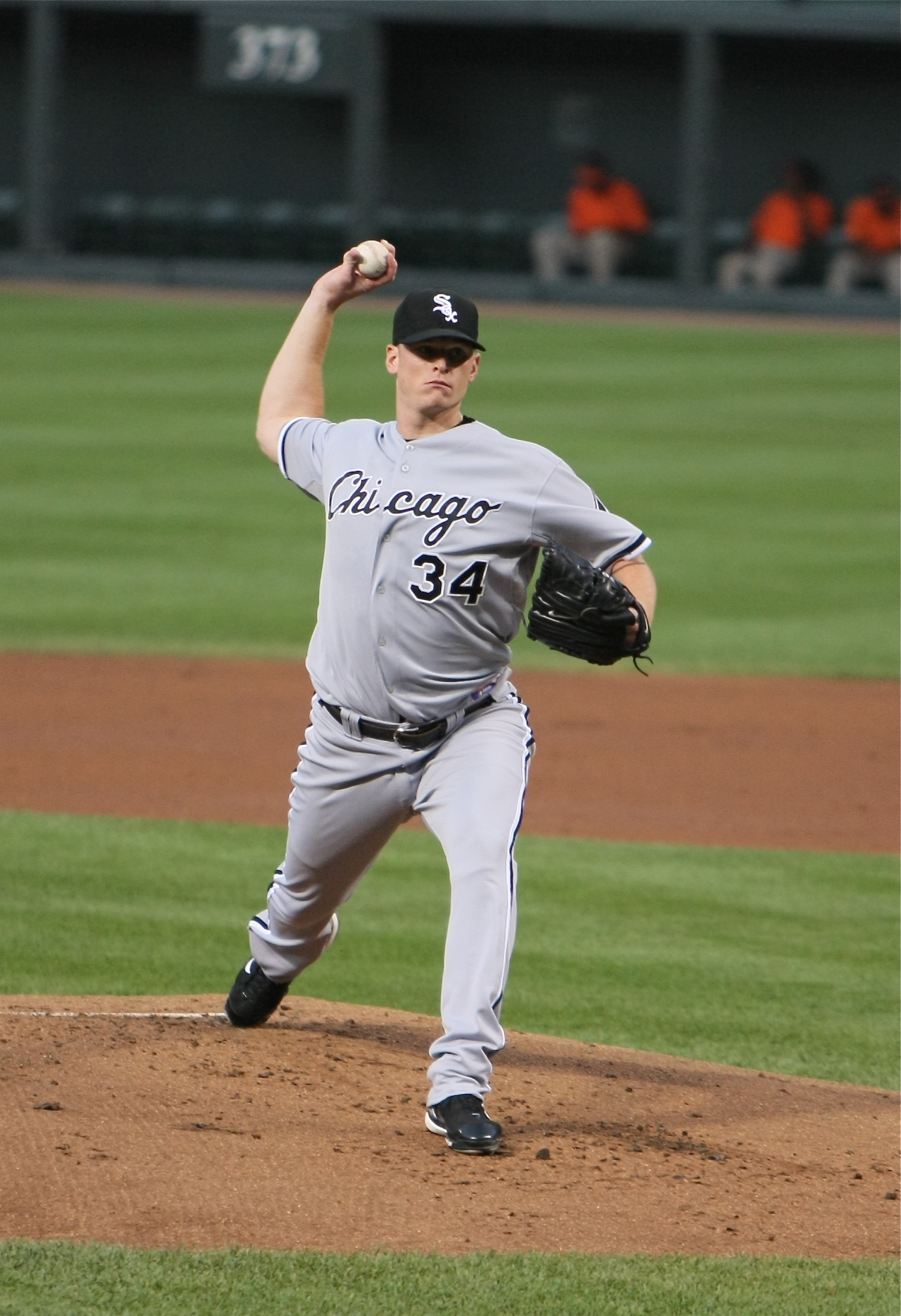
Gavin Floyd, native of Severna Park, Maryland

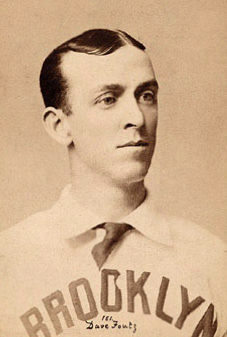
Dave Foutz, native of Carroll County, Maryland

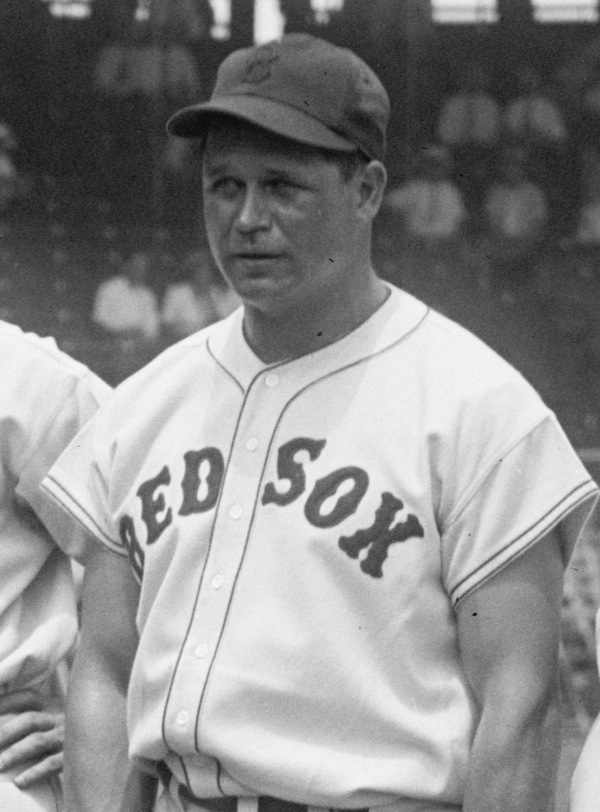
Jimmie Foxx, native of Sudlersville, Maryland

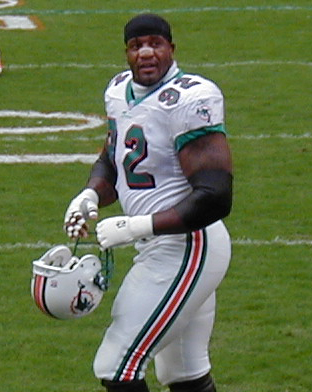
Daryl Gardener, native of Baltimore, Maryland

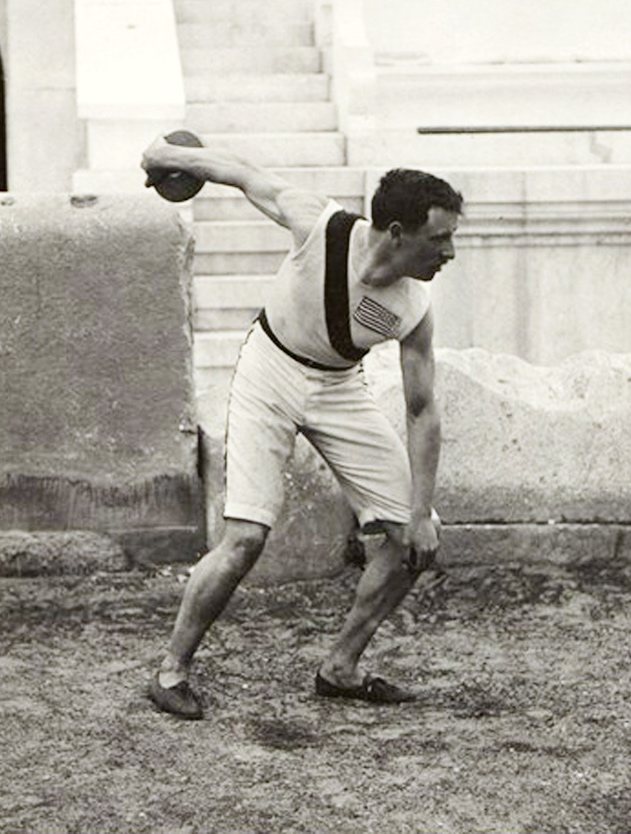
Robert Garrett, native of Baltimore County, Maryland

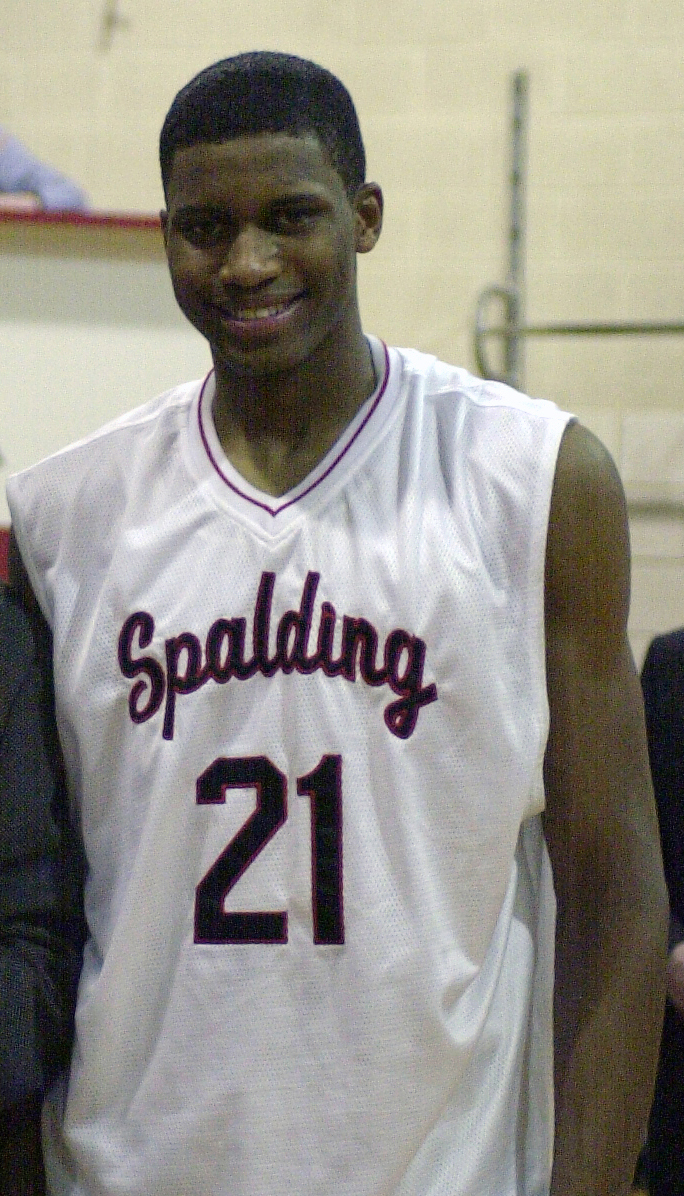
Rudy Gay, native of Baltimore, Maryland

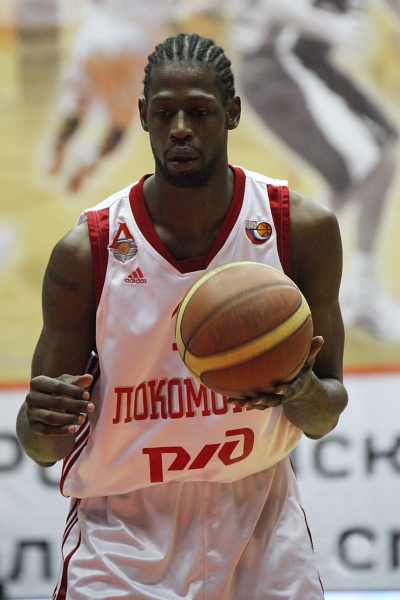
James Gist, native of Silver Spring, Maryland

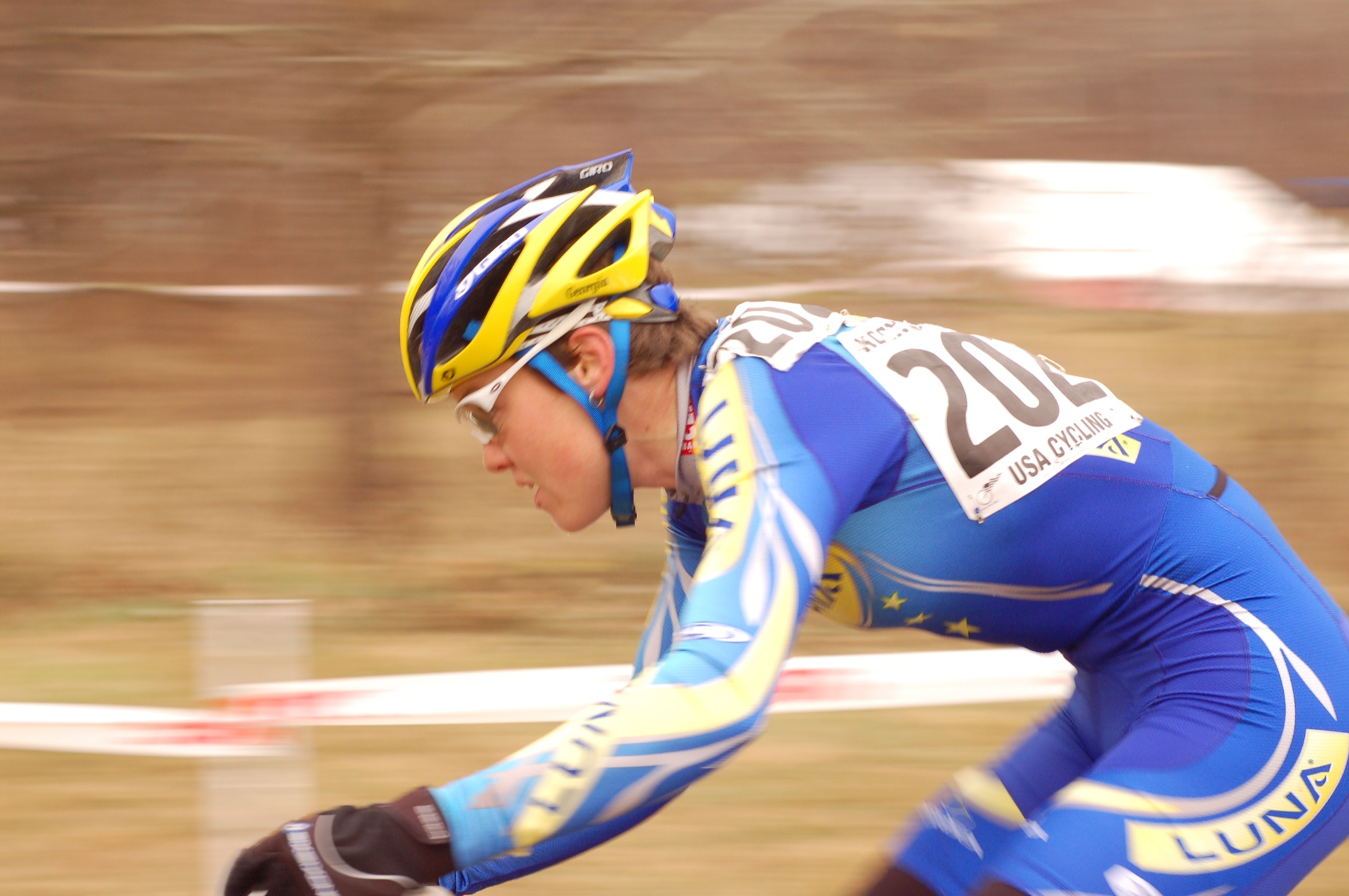
Georgia Gould, native of Baltimore, Maryland

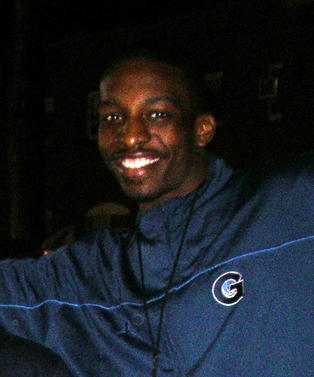
Jeff Green, native of Cheverly, Maryland

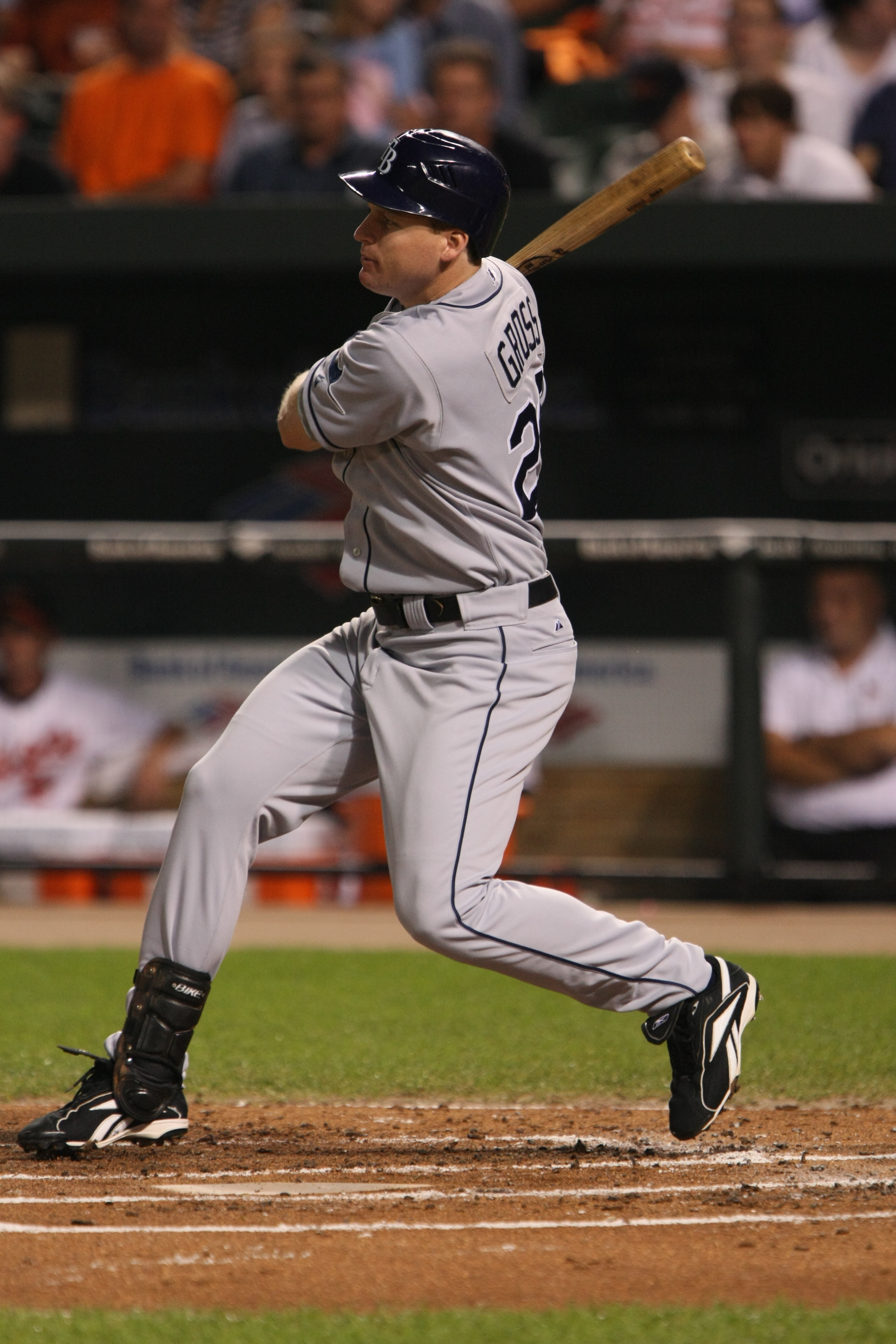
Gabe Gross, native of Baltimore, Maryland

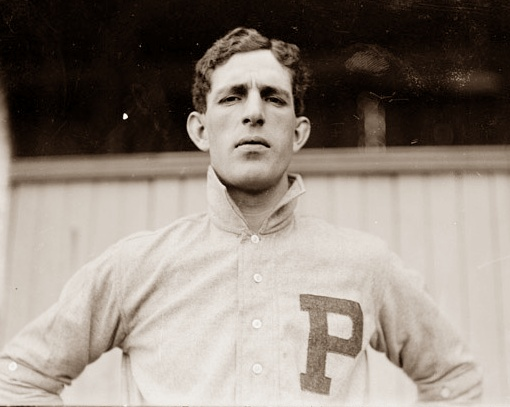
Bob Hall, native of Baltimore, Maryland

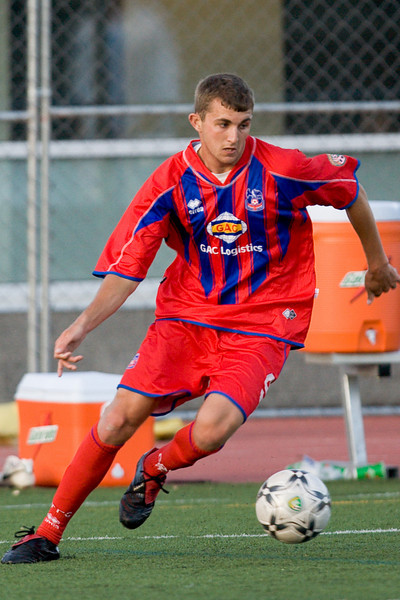
Pat Healey, native of Baltimore, Maryland

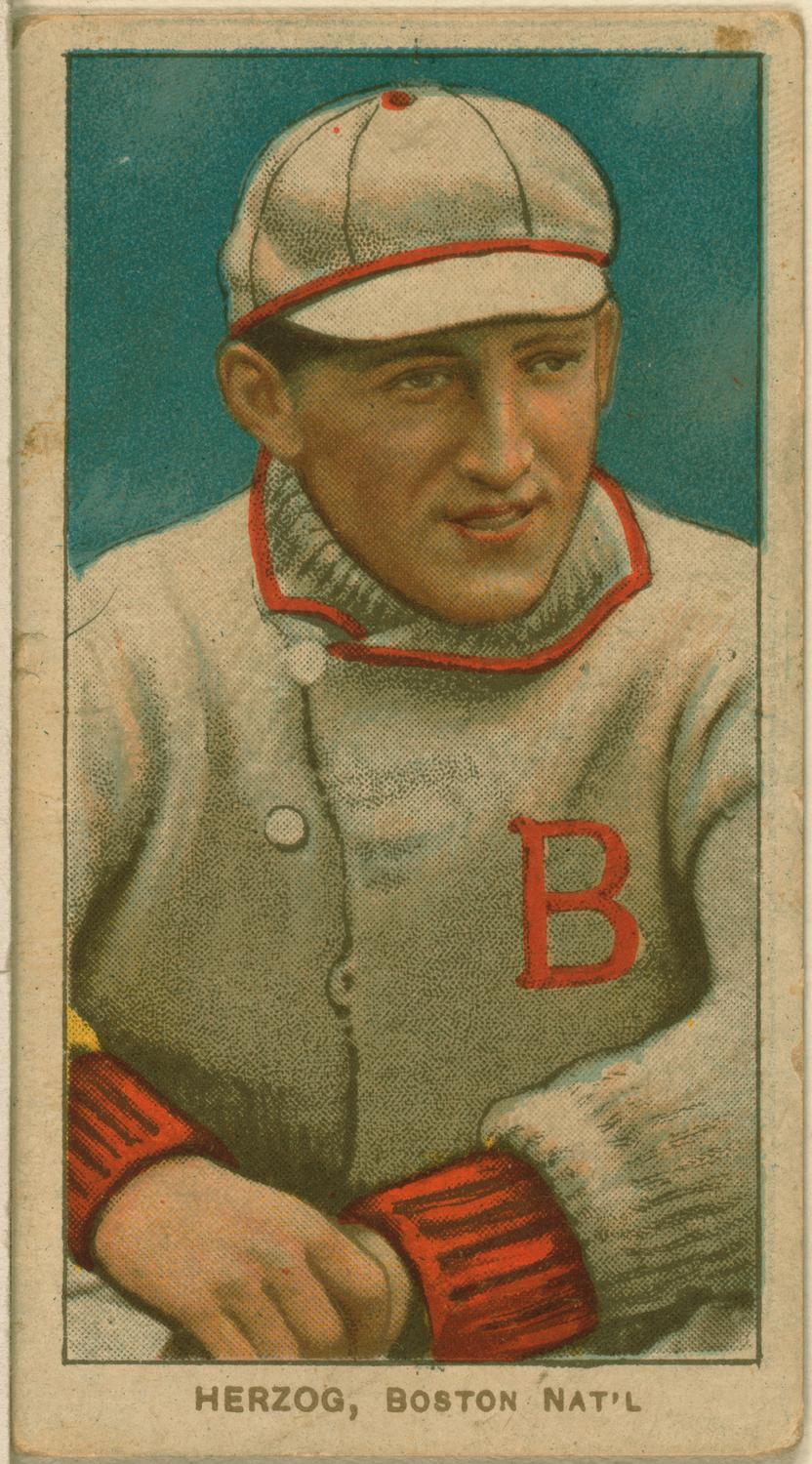
Buck Herzog, native of Baltimore, Maryland

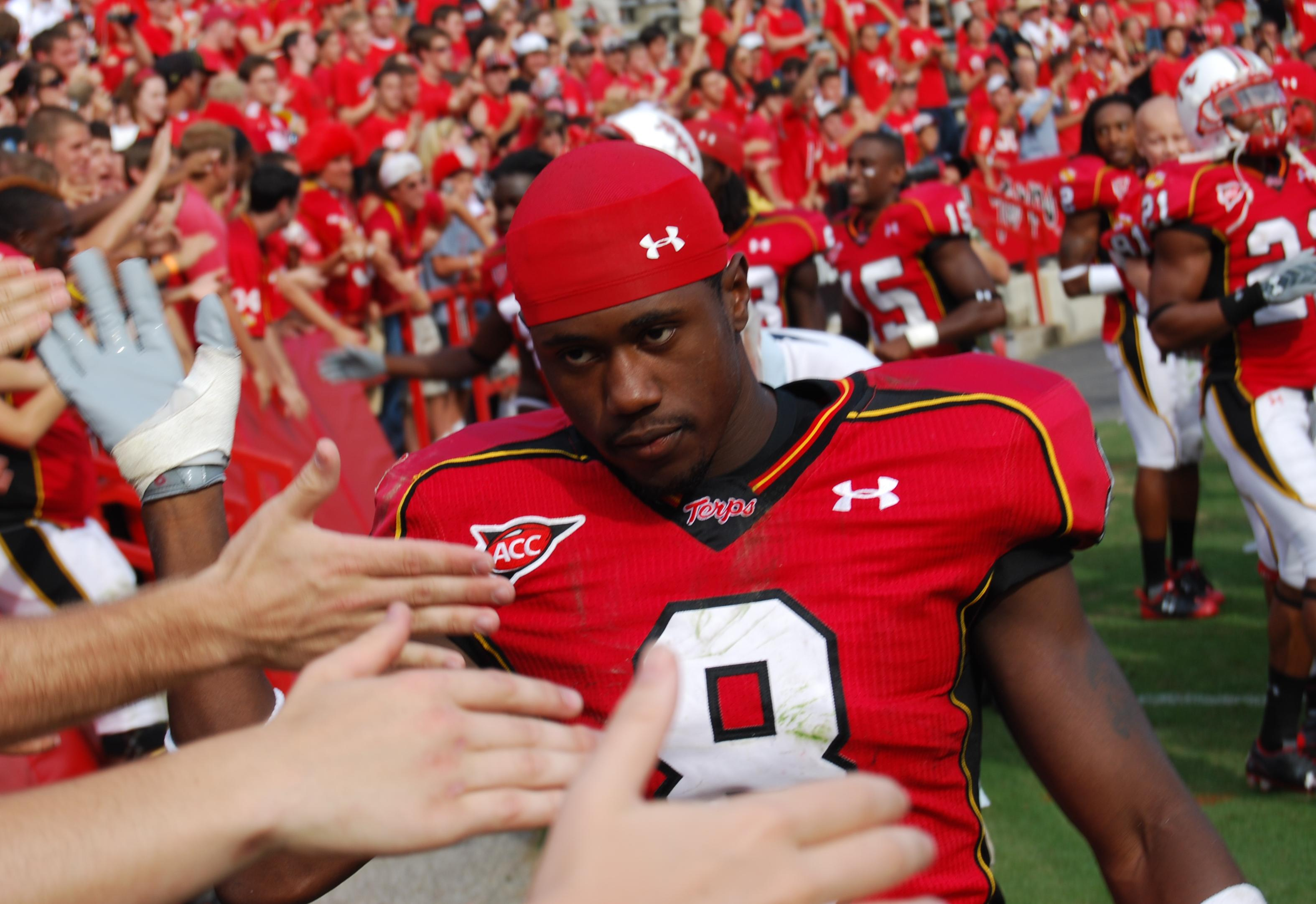
Darrius Heyward-Bey, native of Silver Spring, Maryland

Bill Holbert, native of Baltimore, Maryland

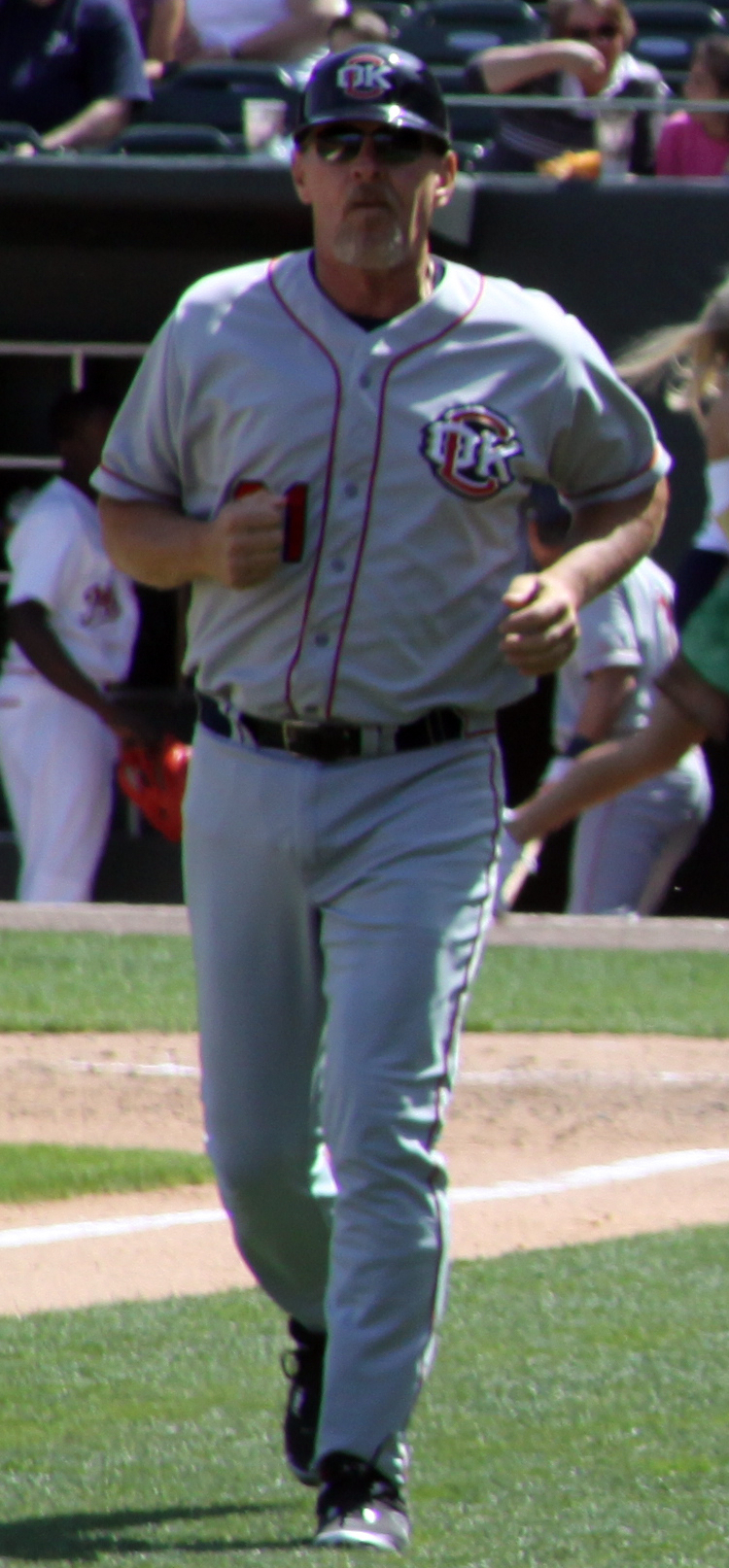
Bobby Jones, native of Elkton, Maryland

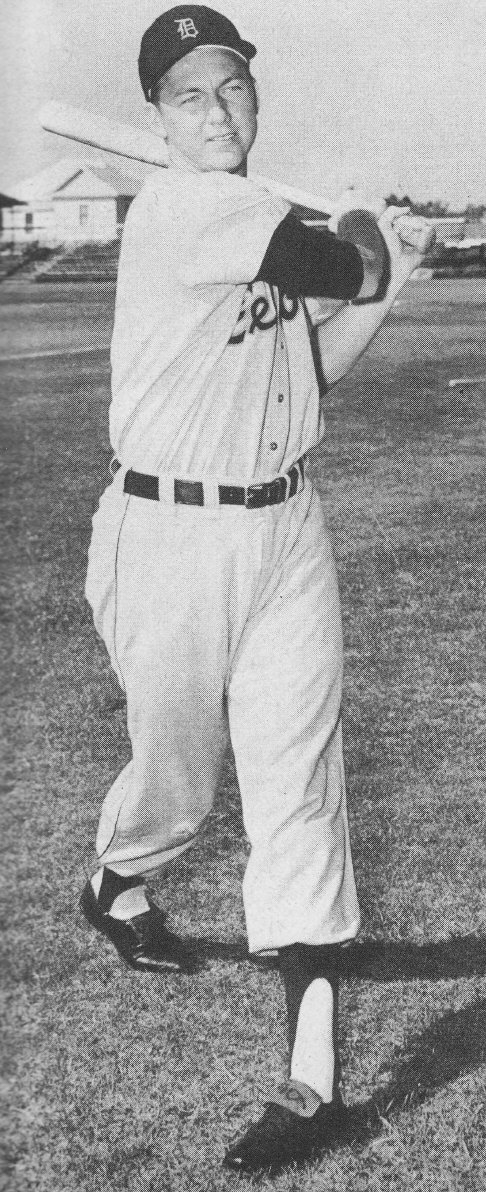
Al Kaline, native of Baltimore, Maryland and member of Baseball Hall of Fame

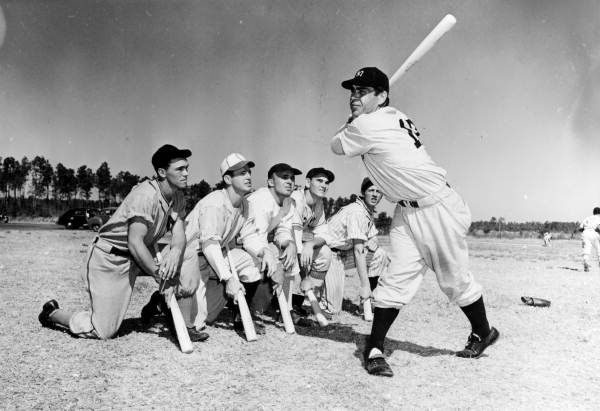
Charlie Keller, native of Middletown, Maryland

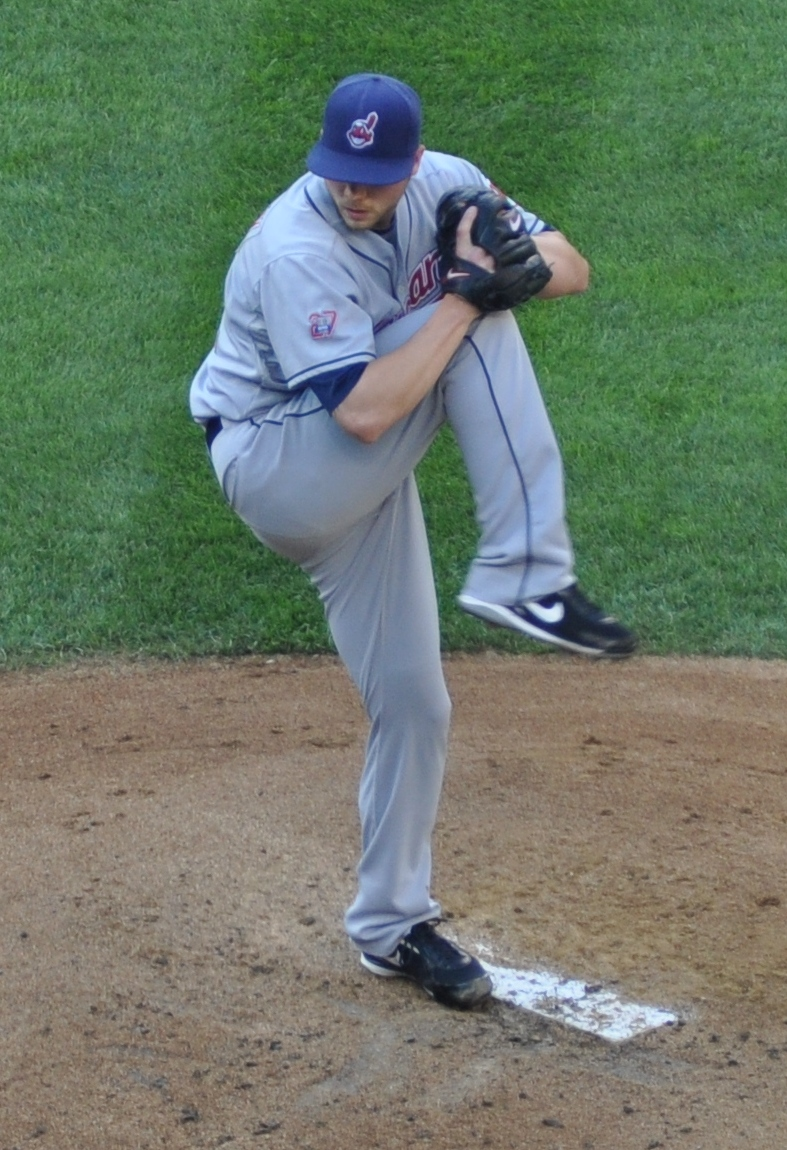
Aaron Laffey, native of Cumberland, Maryland

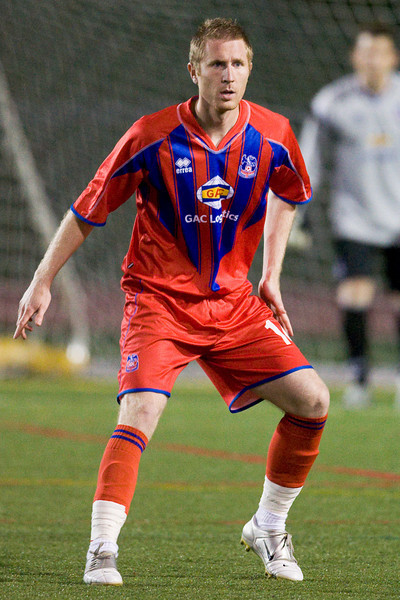
Mike Lookingland, native of Fallston

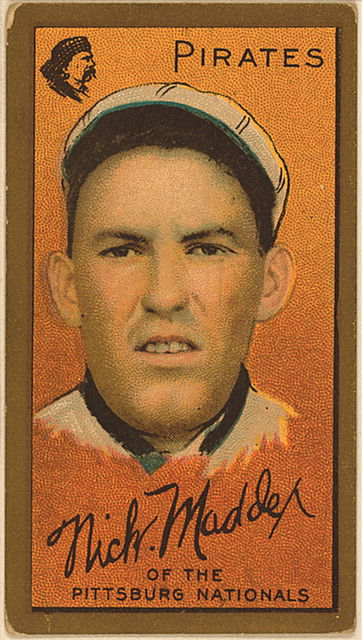
Nick Maddox, native of Govanstown, Maryland

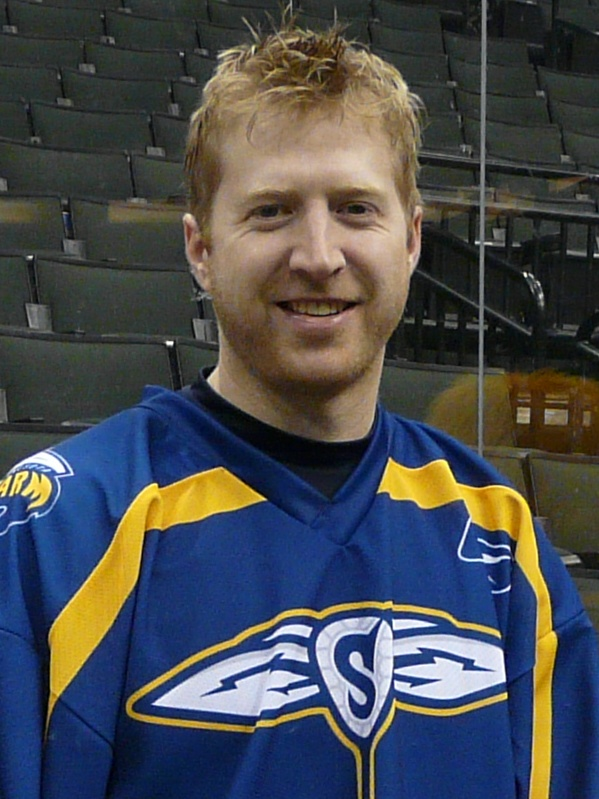
Dan Marohl, native of Annapolis, Maryland

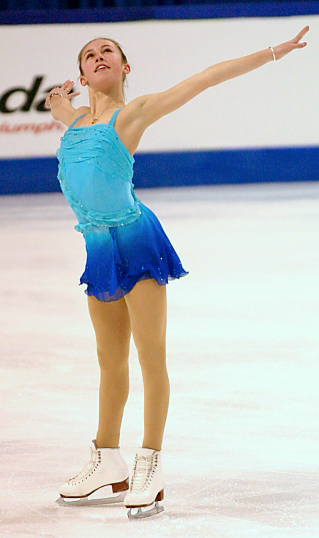
Kimmie Meissner, native of Towson, Maryland

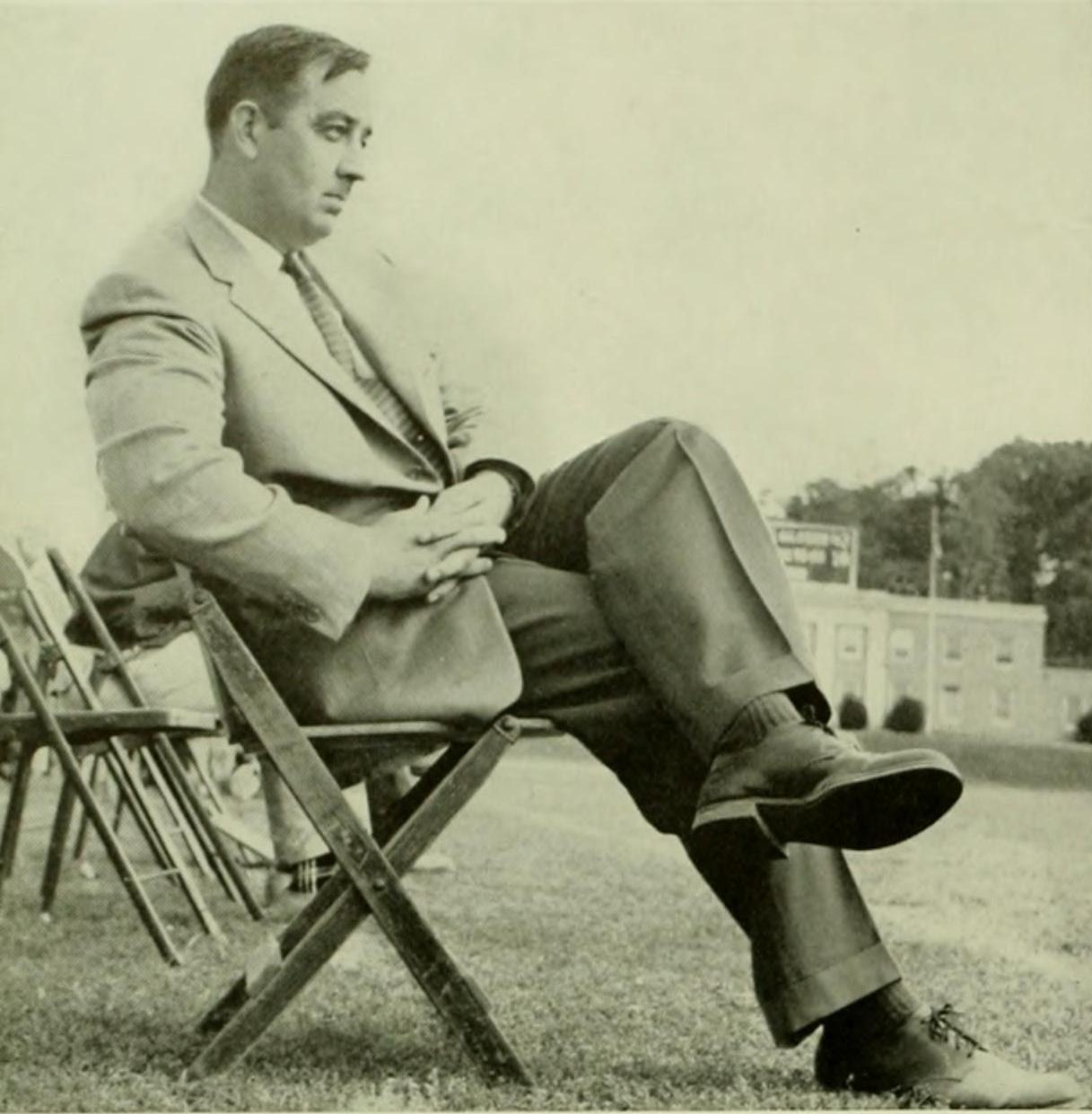
Tommy Mont, native of Mount Savage, Maryland

Name	Sport	Professional years	Hometown	Notes	Ref
== A ==
Rob Abiamiri	American football	2005–2007	Randallstown		
Victor Abiamiri	American football	2007–2009	Baltimore		
Nick Adenhart	Baseball	2008–2009	Silver Spring		
David Alexander	American football	1987–1994, 1996	Silver Spring		
Yari Allnutt	Soccer	1989–2004	Baltimore		
Tom Amrhein	Soccer	1934–1947	Baltimore	Inducted into the Maryland Soccer Hall of Fame in 1981	
Brady Anderson	Baseball	1988–2002	Silver Spring		
Harry Anderson	Baseball	1957–1961	North East	Inducted into Delaware Sports Museum and Hall of Fame in 1981	
Richie Anderson	American football	1993–2004	Olney		
Tom Angley	Baseball	1925	Baltimore		
Sam Anno	American football	1987–1993	Silver Spring		
Steve Armas	Soccer	1999–2005	Germantown		
Bob Armstrong	Baseball	1871	Baltimore		
Trace Armstrong	American football	1989–2003	Bethesda		
Kyle Arrington	American football	2008–present	Accokeek		
Sonny Askew	Soccer	1977–1989	Baltimore	Inducted into Maryland Soccer Hall of Fame in 1994	
Ed Atkinson	Baseball	1873	Baltimore		
Tavon Austin	Football	2013	Baltimore		
Dick Aylward	Baseball	1953	Baltimore		
== B ==
Carlton Bailey	American football	1988–1997	Baltimore		
Harold Baines	Baseball	1980–2001	Easton	First overall draft pick in 1977 Major League Baseball draft	
John Baker	Baseball	1908–1922	Trappe	Inducted into National Baseball Hall of Fame in 1955	
Harry Baldwin	Baseball	1924–1925	Baltimore		
John Bale	Baseball	1999–present	Cheverly		
Jim Ball	Baseball	1907–1908	Harford County		
Chuck Banks	American football	1986–1987	Baltimore		
Josh Banks	Baseball	2007–present	Baltimore		
Ken Bannister	Basketball	1984–1991	Baltimore		
Steve Barber	Baseball	1960–1974	Takoma Park		
Devin Barclay	Soccer	2001–2005	Annapolis		
Brian Bark	Baseball	1990–1995	Baltimore		
Brooks Barnard	American football	2003			
Vic Barnhart	Baseball	1944–1945	Hagerstown		
Dave Batton	Basketball	1982–1984	Baltimore		
Lonny Baxter	Basketball	2002–present	Silver Spring		
Johnny Beall	Baseball	1913–1916, 1918	Beltsville		
Betsy Beard	Rowing	1984, 1988	Baltimore		
Ted Beard	Baseball	1948–1958	Woodsboro		
Michael Beasley	Basketball	2008–present	Frederick		
Ed Beatin	Baseball	1887–1891	Baltimore		
Desmond Beatty	Baseball	1914	Baltimore		
Kyle Beckerman	Soccer	2000–present	Crofton		
Brian Bell	American football	2007	Kettering		
Jacob Bender	American football	2007–present	Mayo		
Frank Bennett	Baseball	1927–1928	Mardela Springs		
Harry Benson	American football	1935			
Jack Bentley	Baseball	1913–1926	Silver Spring		
Boze Berger	Baseball	1932–1939	Baltimore		
Stephen Berger	Lacrosse	2004–present	Jessup		
Mike Bielecki	Baseball	1984–1997	Baltimore		
Harry Biemiller	Baseball	1920–1925	Baltimore		
Norman Black	Basketball	1980–1997	Baltimore		
Leigh Bodden	American football	2003–present	Hyattsville		
Muggsy Bogues	Basketball	1987–2001	Baltimore		
Josh Boone	Basketball	2006–present	Mount Airy		
Keith Booth	Basketball	1997–1999	Baltimore		
Dave Boswell	Baseball	1964–1971	Baltimore		
Beth Botsford	Swimming	1996	Baltimore		
Ken Boyd	Basketball	1974–1975	Frederick		
Charles Bradley	Basketball	1981–1984	Havre de Grace		
Dudley Bradley	Basketball	1979–1989	Baltimore		
Art Bragg	Track	1952	Baltimore		
Art Brandau	American football	1945–1946	Baltimore		
Hezekiah Braxton	American football	1962–1963	Baltimore		
Rod Breedlove	American football	1960–1967	Cumberland		
Troy Brohawn	Baseball	2001–2003	Cambridge		
Jim Brown	Baseball	1915–1916	Laurel		
Roger Brown	American football	1990–1992	Baltimore		
Stub Brown	Baseball	1893–1897	Baltimore		
Jeff Brubaker	Ice hockey	1974–1989	Hagerstown		
Mark Budzinski	Baseball	1995–2005	Severna Park		
Scott Buete	Soccer	2004–present	Bowie		
Damon Buford	Baseball	1993–2001	Baltimore		
Elise Burgin	Tennis	1980–1993	Baltimore	Inducted into the USTA Mid–Atlantic Tennis Hall of Fame in 2003	
Leo Burke	Baseball	1958–1965	Hagerstown		
C. B. Burns	Baseball	1902	Bayview		
Evers Burns	Basketball	1993–1998	Baltimore		
Preston Burpo	Soccer	1997–present	Bethesda		
Al Burris	Baseball	1894	Warwick		
Joe Buskey	Baseball	1926	Cumberland		
Bill Butler	Baseball	1969–1977	Hyattsville		
Tommy Byrne	Baseball	1943–1953	Baltimore		
== C ==
Michael Campanaro	American football	2014–present	Clarksville		
Nick Campofreda	American football	1944	Baltimore		
Fred Carl	Baseball	1899	Baltimore		
Luke Carlin	Baseball	2002–present	Silver Spring		
Keion Carpenter	American football	1999–2005	Baltimore		
Ed Carroll	Baseball	1929	Baltimore		
James Carter	Track	2000–2009	Baltimore		
Louis Carter	American football	1975–1978	Laurel		
Sam Cassell	Basketball	1993–present	Baltimore		
Brett Cecil	Baseball	2009–present	Dunkirk		
Florence Chambers	Swimming	1924	Baltimore		
Harry Chappas	Baseball	1978–1980	Mount Rainier		
Kaila Charles	Basketball	2020–present	Glenn Dale		
Raymond Chester	American football	1970–1981, 1983	Cambridge	First round draft pick in 1970 NFL draft	
Harry Child	Baseball	1930	Baltimore		
Cupid Childs	Baseball	1888–1901	Calvert County		
Earl Christy	American football	1966–1968	Perryman		
Eugene Chung	American football	1992–1997	Prince George's County		
Sherm Clark	Rowing	1920	Baltimore		
Harry Clarke	American football	1940–1948	Cumberland		
Lefty Clarke	Baseball	1921	Clarksville		
Bill Clay	Baseball	1902	Baltimore		
Colin Cloherty	American football	2009–present	Bethesda		
Ken Cloude	Baseball	1994–2004	Baltimore		
Andy Cohen	Baseball	1926–1929	Baltimore		
Syd Cohen	Baseball	1934–1937	Baltimore		
Dave Cole	Baseball	1950–1955	Williamsport		
Gordy Coleman	Baseball	1959–1967	Rockville		
Mike Collier	American football	1975–1979	Baltimore		
Harry Colliflower	Baseball	1899	Petersville		
Andrew Combs	Lacrosse	2003–present	Towson		
Bill Conaty	American football	1997–2004	Baltimore		
Kenny Cooper	Soccer	2004–present	Baltimore		
Brandon Copeland	American football	2013–present	Sykesville		
Jim Cox	American football	1968	Baltimore		
Omar Cuff	American football	2008–present	Landover		
Bill Currier	American football	1977–1985	Glen Burnie		
== D ==
Quintin Dailey	Basketball	1982–1992	Baltimore	First round draft pick in 1982 NBA draft	
Hugh Daily	Baseball	1882–1887	Baltimore		
Bill Dalrymple	Baseball	1915	Baltimore		
Doug Davis	American football	1966–1972	Elkton		
Pierpont Davis	Sailing	1932	Baltimore		
Trench Davis	Baseball	1980–1987	Baltimore		
Dominique Dawes	Gymnastics	1989–2000	Silver Spring	1996 Olympic gold medalist	
Don Dee	Basketball	1968–1969	Booneville	1968 Olympic gold medalist	
Eddie Dent	Baseball	1909–1912	Baltimore		
Buttercup Dickerson	Baseball	1878–1885	Tyaskin		
Roy Dietzel	Baseball	1954	Baltimore		
Glenn Dishman	Baseball	1993–2000	Baltimore		
Juan Dixon	Basketball	2002–2011	Baltimore	First round draft pick in 2002 NBA draft	
Kyle Dixon	Lacrosse	2006–present	Annapolis		
Darnell Dockett	American football	2004–present	Burtonsville		
Joe Dolan	Baseball	1896–1901	Baltimore		
John Dopson	Baseball	1982–1994	Baltimore		
Joey Dorsey	Basketball	2008–present	Baltimore		
John Dorsey	American football	1984–1988	Leonardtown		
John Douglas	American football	1970–1973	Columbia		
Terry Dozier	Basketball	1989–2001	Baltimore		
Mike Draper	Baseball	1988–1994	Hagerstown		
Tim Drummond	Baseball	1983–1992	La Plata		
Clyde Duncan	American football	1984–1985	Oxon Hill	First round draft pick in 1984 NFL draft	
Matt Dyson	American football	1995	La Plata		
== E ==
Bill Eagle	Baseball	1898	Rockville		
Charlie Eakle	Baseball	1915			
Ed Edelen	Baseball	1932	Bryantown		
Corsley Edwards	Basketball	2004–2005	Baltimore		
Cal Ermer	Baseball	1947	Baltimore		
Buck Etchison	Baseball	1943–1944	Baltimore		
Ferd Eunick	Baseball	1917	Baltimore		
Jake Evans	Baseball	1878–1885	Baltimore		
Leon Evans	American football	1985–1986	Silver Spring		
== F ==
Harry Fanwell	Baseball	1910	Patapsco		
Steve Farr	Baseball	1977–1994	La Plata		
Duane Ferrell	Basketball	1988–1999	Baltimore		
Danny Ferry	Basketball	1989–2003	Baltimore		
Chick Fewster	Baseball	1917–1927	Baltimore		
John Fick	Baseball	1944	Baltimore		
Jack Fisher	Baseball	1959–1969	Frostburg		
Charlie Fitzberger	Baseball	1928	Baltimore		
Jack Flater	Baseball	1908	Sandymount		
Tom Flick	American football	1981–1987	Patuxent River		
Jake Flowers	Baseball	1923–1934	Cambridge		
Gavin Floyd	Baseball	2002–present	Severna Park		
Darren Flutie	American football	1988–2002	Manchester	Inducted into the Canadian Football Hall of Fame in 2007	
Doug Flutie	American football	1985–2005	Manchester	* Inducted into the Canada's Sports Hall of Fame in 2008, becoming the first non-Canadian inductee * Inducted into the College Football Hall of Fame in 2007 * Inducted into the Canadian Football Hall of Fame in 2008	
Kenneth Foote	Rowing	1976	Baltimore		
Spencer Ford	Lacrosse	2001–present	Towson		
Brownie Foreman	Baseball	1895–1896	Baltimore		
Chuck Foreman	American football	1973–1980	Frederick	First round draft pick in 1973 NFL draft	
Frank Foreman	Baseball	1884–1902	Baltimore		
Dave Foutz	Baseball	1884–1896	Carroll County		
Frank Foutz	Baseball	1901	Baltimore		
Wayne Fowler	American football	1970	Baltimore		
Jimmie Foxx	Baseball	1925–1945	Sudlersville	* 3-time AL MVP in 1932, 1933 and 1938 * Won AL Triple Crown in 1933 * Inducted into National Baseball Hall of Fame in 1951	
Hank Fraley	American football	2000–present	Gaithersburg		
Steve Francis	Basketball	1999–2007	Takoma Park	* First round draft pick in 1999 NBA draft * 2000 co-NBA Rookie of the Year	
Brian Franco	American football	1987	Annapolis		
Antonio Freeman	American football	1995–2003	Baltimore		
John Friedberg	Fencing	1992	Baltimore		
Sam Frock	Baseball	1907–1911	Baltimore		
Jean Fugett	American football	1972–1979	Baltimore		
Jim Fuller	Baseball	1973–1978	Bethesda		
Vincent Fuller	American football	2005–present	Baltimore		
== G ==
Jim Gaffney	American football	1945–1946	Cumberland		
Jared Gaither	American football	2007–2012	White Plains		
Daryl Gardener	American football	1996–2004	Baltimore	First round draft pick in 1996 NFL draft	
Carwell Gardner	American football	1990–1997	Baltimore		
Bill Gardner	Baseball	1887	Baltimore		
Ray Gardner	Baseball	1929–1930	Frederick		
Basil Spalding de Garmendia	Tennis	1990	Baltimore		
Robert Garrett	Track	1896, 1900	Towson	* 1896 shot put Olympic gold medalist * 1896 discus Olympic gold medalist	
Terence Garvin	American football	2013–present	Baltimore		
Keith Gary	American football	1983–1988	Bethesda	First round draft pick in 1981 NFL draft	
Tom Gatewood	American football	1972–1973	Baltimore		
Mike Gaule	Baseball	1889	Baltimore		
Rudy Gay	Basketball	2006–present	Baltimore	First round draft pick in 2006 NBA draft	
Bob Gerhardt	Rowing	1924	Baltimore		
Rusty Gerhardt	Baseball	1974–1983	Baltimore		
Les German	Baseball	1890–1897	Baltimore		
Charlie Gettig	Baseball	1896–1899	Baltimore		
Tom Gettinger	Baseball	1889–1895	Frederick		
Bill Gilbert	Baseball	1892	Havre de Grace		
Dondre Gilliam	American Football	2002–2003	Baltimore		
Jim Gilmore	Baseball	1875	Baltimore		
James Gist	Basketball	2008–present	Silver Spring		
Wally Goldsmith	Baseball	1871–1875	Baltimore		
Jason Goode	American football	2008–present	Baltimore		
Keith Gordon	Baseball	1991–2000	Bethesda		
Brian Gottfried	Tennis	1973–1984	Baltimore	* Inducted into the Intercollegiate Tennis Association's Intercollegiate Tennis Hall of Fame in 1990 * Inducted into the International Jewish Sports Hall of Fame in 1999	
Georgia Gould	Cycling	2006–present	Baltimore		
Ed Grain	American football	1947–1948	Baltimore		
Lou Grasmick	Baseball	1948	Baltimore		
Devin Gray	Basketball	1996–2000	Baltimore		
Bill Green	Track	1984	Laurel	Inducted into the Long Beach State Athletic Hall of Fame in 2001	
Jeff Green	Basketball	2007–present	Cheverly	First round draft pick in 2007 NBA draft	
Tony Greene	American football	1971–1979	Clarksburg		
Robert Griffith	American football	1994–2006	Lanham		
John Grimes	Baseball	1897	Woodstock		
Gabe Gross	Baseball	2001–present	Baltimore	First round draft pick in 2001 MLB draft	
Lefty Grove	Baseball	1920–1941	Lonaconing	* AL MVP in 1931 * Inducted into National Baseball Hall of Fame in 1947	
Bucky Guth	Baseball	1969–1972	Baltimore		
== H ==
Moose Haas	Baseball	1974–1987	Baltimore		
Joe Haden	American football	2010–present	Fort Washington		
Alex Hall	American football	2008–present	Glenarden		
Bob Hall	Baseball	1904–1905	Baltimore		
Irv Hall	Baseball	1943–1946	Alberton		
Jeff Halpern	Hockey	1999–present	Potomac		
Shane Halter	Baseball	1991–2005	La Plata		
Chris Haney	Baseball	1990–2002	Baltimore		
Tommy Hannan	Swimming	2000	Baltimore	2000 Olympic gold medalist	
Louis Harant	Shooting	1920	Baltimore	1920 Olympic gold medalist	
Kyle Harrison	Lacrosse	2005–present	Baltimore		
Kyle Hartzell	Lacrosse	2008–present	Dundalk		
Derrick Harvey	American football	2008–present	Greenbelt	First round draft pick in 2008, 8th pick	
Jeff Hatch	American football	2002–2005	Annapolis		
Marcus Hatten	Basketball			2006 top scorer in the Israel Basketball Premier League	
Bill Hayes	Baseball	1978–1987	Cheverly	First round draft pick in 1978 MLB draft	
David Hayes	Soccer	1999–2008	Waldorf		
Pat Healey	Soccer	2008–present	Baltimore		
Vaughn Hebron	American football	1993–1998	Baltimore		
Roy Heiser	Baseball	1961	Baltimore		
E.J. Henderson	American football	2002–present	Aberdeen		
Erin Henderson	American football	2008–present	Aberdeen		
Kevin Henderson	Basketball	1986–1988	Baltimore		
Dwayne Henry	Baseball	1980–1996	Elkton		
Walt Herrell	Baseball	1911	Baltimore		
Earl Hersh	Baseball	1956	Ebbvale		
Buck Herzog	Baseball	1908–1920	Baltimore		
Darrius Heyward-Bey	American football	2009–present	Silver Spring	First-round draft pick in the 2009 NFL draft	
Ed High	Baseball	1901	Baltimore		
Calvin Hill	American football	1969–1981	Baltimore	First round draft pick in 1969 NFL/AFL draft	
Charles Hill	American football	2002–present	Palmer Park		
Sam Hinds	Baseball	1977–1979	Frederick		
Gene Hiser	Baseball	1970–1975	Baltimore	First round draft pick in 1970 MLB draft	
Bill Hohman	Baseball	1927	Brooklyn		
Bill Holbert	Baseball	1876–1888	Baltimore		
Michael Holston	American football	1981–1985	Seat Pleasant		
Mike Hooper	Baseball	1873	Baltimore		
Jack Horner	Baseball	1894	Baltimore		
Hanson Horsey	Baseball	1912	Galena		
Spencer Horwitz	Baseball			First baseman for the Toronto Blue Jays	
Bruce Howard	Baseball	1963–1968	Salisbury		
Tanya Hughes	Track	1992	Baltimore		
Tom Hull	American football	1974–1975	Cumberland		
Kevin Huntley	Lacrosse	2008–present	Towson	2008 MLL Rookie of the Year	
== I ==
Erik Imler	Soccer	1992–1999	Silver Spring		
Steve Ingram	American football	1995–2000	Cheverly		
== J ==
Jarrett Jack	Basketball	2005–present	Fort Washington	First round draft pick in 2005 NBA draft	
David Jackson	American football	1987	Baltimore		
Tanard Jackson	American football	2007–present	Silver Spring		
Tracy Jackson	Basketball	1981–1984	Rockville		
Victor Jackson	American football	1986–1987	Princess Anne		
Jon Jenkins	American football	1949–1950	Frostburg		
Steve Jennings	Field hockey	1996	Bethesda		
Tommy Johns	Baseball	1873	Baltimore		
Bryant Johnson	American football	2003–present	Baltimore	First round draft pick in 2003 NFL draft	
Dave Johnson	Baseball	1982–1993	Baltimore		
Judy Johnson	Baseball	1918–1936	Snow Hill	* Inducted into National Baseball Hall of Fame in 1975 * First athlete inducted into the Delaware Sports Museum and Hall of Fame, in 1976	
Larry Johnson	American football	2003–present	La Plata	First round draft pick in 2003 NFL draft	
Brian Johnston	American football	1986–1987	Highland		
Eric Jonassen	American football	1992–1997	Baltimore		
Anthony Jones	American football	1984–1988	Baltimore		
Bobby Jones	Baseball	1967–1987	Elkton		
Freddie Jones	American football	1997–2004	Cheverly		
Marlon Jones	American football	1987–1991	Baltimore		
Brian Jordan	Baseball	1988–2006	Baltimore	First round draft pick in 1988 MLB draft	
LaMont Jordan	American football	2001–present	Forestville		
Slats Jordan	Baseball	1901–1902	Baltimore		
Thomas Jordan	Basketball	1992–1993	Baltimore		
Brian Jozwiak	American football	1986–1988	Catonsville	First round draft pick in 1986 NFL draft	
== K ==
Al Kaline	Baseball	1953–1974	Baltimore	Inducted into National Baseball Hall of Fame in 1980	
N. D. Kalu	American football	1997–2008	Baltimore		
Mark Karcher	Basketball	2000–present	Baltimore		
Vic Keen	Baseball	1918–1927	Bel Air		
George Keerl	Baseball	1875	Baltimore		
Jim Keesey	Baseball	1925–1930	Perryville		
Bill Keister	Baseball	1896–1903	Baltimore		
Charlie Keller	Baseball	1939–1952	Middletown		
Hal Keller	Baseball	1949–1952	Middletown		
Billy Kelly	Baseball	1910–1913	Baltimore		
Bryan Kelly	Baseball	1981–1987	Silver Spring		
Eric King	American football	2005–present	Baltimore		
Vince Kinney	American football	1978–1979	Baltimore		
Rudy Kneisch	Baseball	1926	Baltimore		
Mike Knode	Baseball	1920	Westminster		
Ray Knode	Baseball	1923–1926	Westminster		
Greg Koch	American football	1977–1987	Bethesda		
Henry Kohler	Baseball	1871–1874	Baltimore		
Jeff Komlo	American football	1979–1983	Cheverly		
Brian Kowitz	Baseball	1988–1996	Baltimore		
Nicholas Kropfelder	Soccer	1942–1954	Baltimore	Inducted into National Soccer Hall of Fame in 1996	
== L ==
Aaron Laffey	Baseball	2003–present	Cumberland		
Bill Lamar	Baseball	1917–1927	Rockville		
Sean Landeta	American football	1983–2006	Baltimore		
Millard Lang	Soccer	1934–1942	Baltimore	* Inducted into the National Soccer Hall of Fame in 1950 * Inducted into the National Lacrosse Hall of Fame in 1978 * Inducted into the Maryland Soccer Hall of Fame in 1983 * Inducted into the Johns Hopkins Athletic Hall of Fame in 1995	
James Lauf	Cycling	1952	Baltimore		
Kurk Lee	Basketball	1990–2001	Baltimore		
Jim Lehew	Baseball	1958–1962	Baltimore		
Dummy Leitner	Baseball	1901–1902	Parkton		
Reid Lennan	American football	1945–1947	Baltimore		
Jack Lentz	American football	1967–1968	Baltimore		
Walt Lerian	Baseball	1928–1929	Baltimore		
Jermaine Lewis	American football	1996–2004	Lanham		
Mechelle Lewis	Track	2008	Oxon Hill		
Reggie Lewis	Basketball	1987–1993	Baltimore	First round draft pick in 1987 NBA draft	
Larry Linne	American football	1987	Baltimore		
Phil Linz	Baseball	1962–1968	Baltimore		
Tom Lipp	Baseball	1897	Baltimore		
Ed Listopad	American football	1952	Baltimore		
Jessica Long	Swimming	2004–present	Baltimore		
Mike Lookingland	Soccer	2005–present	Fallston		
Charlie Loudenslager	Baseball	1904	Baltimore		
Don Loun	Baseball	1964	Frederick		
Marty Lyons	American football	1979–1989	Takoma Park		
John Lyston	Baseball	1891–1894	Baltimore		
== M ==
Bob Maddox	American football	1974–1976	Frederick		
Nick Maddox	Baseball	1907–1910	Govanstown		
Charlie Maisel	Baseball	1915	Catonsville		
Fritz Maisel	Baseball	1913–1918	Catonsville		
George Maisel	Baseball	1913–1922	Catonsville		
Ben Mallonee	Baseball	1921	Baltimore		
Lew Malone	Baseball	1915–1919	Baltimore		
Matt Maloney	Basketball	1995–2003	Silver Spring		
Mark Manges	American football	1978	Cumberland		
Harry Marcoplos	Field hockey	1948, 1956	Baltimore		
Dan Marohl	Lacrosse	2002–present	Annapolis		
Lindsey Mason	American football	1978–1983	Baltimore		
Bobby Mathews	Baseball	1871–1887	Baltimore		
Jimmy Mathison	Baseball	1902	Baltimore		
Joe Matthews	Baseball	1922	Baltimore		
Steve Matthias	Baseball	1884	Mitchellville		
Earl Mattingly	Baseball	1931	Newport		
Justin Maxwell	Baseball	2006–present	Olney		
Aaron Maybin	American football	2009–present	Ellicott City	First-round draft pick in the 2009 NFL draft	
Andrew Maynard	Boxer	1988–2000	Laurel	1988 Olympic gold medalist	
Scott McBrien	American football	2004–2007	Rockville		
Gene McCann	Baseball	1901–1902			
Darnerien McCants	American football	1901–1902	Baltimore		
Roger McCardell	Baseball	1959	Gorsuch Mills		
Jack McClinton	Basketball	2004–present	Baltimore		
Chris McCray	Basketball	2006–2007	Capitol Heights		
Ambrose McGann	Baseball	1895	Baltimore		
Ed McGlasson	American football	1979–1981	Annapolis		
Tom McHale	American football	1987–1995	Gaithersburg		
Randy McMillan	American football	1981–1986	Havre de Grace		
Kimmie Meissner	Figure skating	2003–present	Towson		
Jack Merson	Baseball	1951–1953	Elk Ridge		
Jim Mertens	American football	1969	Cumberland		
Jake Miller	Baseball	1922	Baltimore		
Joe Miller	Baseball	1884–1885	Baltimore		
John Miller	Baseball	1962–1967	Baltimore		
Bob Millman	American football	1925–1927	Cumberland		
Ed Mincher	Baseball	1871–1872	Baltimore		
Carlton Molesworth	Baseball	1895	Frederick		
Rodney Monroe	Basketball	1991–1992	Baltimore		
Tommy Mont	American football	1947–1949	Mount Savage		
Mike Mooney	American football	1992–1993	Baltimore		
Bob Moore	American football	1971–1978	Baltimore		
Ray Moore	Baseball	1952–1963	Meadows		
Ray Morgan	Baseball	1911–1918	Baltimore		
Terence Morris	Basketball	2001–present	Frederick		
Frank Morrissey	Baseball	1901–1902	Baltimore		
Gordie Mueller	Baseball	1950	Baltimore		
Joe Muir	Baseball	1951–1952	Oriole		
Wayne Mulligan	American football	1969–1975	Baltimore		
Brendan Mundorf	Lacrosse	2007–present	Ellicott City		
Jason Murphy	American football	2006–present	Baltimore		
Bruce Murray	Soccer	1984–1995	Germantown	Inducted into the Maryland Soccer Hall of Fame in 2005	
Bert Myers	Baseball	1896–1900	Frederick		
Chip Myrtle	American football	1967–1974	Hyattsville		

== See also ==
- List of people from Maryland#Athletes
- Sports in Maryland
- Maryland#Sports
