= William French =

William French may refer to:

- William H. French (1815–1881), Union general in the American Civil War
- Percy French (William Percy French, 1854–1920), Irish entertainer and artist
- William French (educator) (1786–1849), master of Jesus College, Cambridge
- William French (priest) (1704–1785), Irish Anglican priest, Dean of Ardagh
- William French (archdeacon) (1739–1790), Irish Anglican priest, Archdeacon of Kilfenora
- William French (merchant) (1732–1802)
- William Aden French (1892–1980), American newspaper publisher and author
- William M. R. French (1843–1914), director of the Art Institute of Chicago
- Bill French (baseball) (William Henry French, 1849–1893), American baseball player
- Bill French (footballer) (William Thomas Hunter French, 1884–1972), Australian rules footballer

== See also ==
- Westminster massacre, Vermont, 1775, whose first victim was William French
