= Marty Simpson =

Marty Simpson may refer to:

- Marty Simpson (baseball), 19th-century baseball player
- Marty Simpson, contestant on season 5 of Australian Idol
