= Samuel Hinds =

Samuel Hinds may refer to:

- Sam Hinds (born 1943), Prime Minister of Guyana, 1999–2015
- Samuel Hinds (bishop) (1793–1872), Bishop of Norwich, 1849–1857
- Sam Hinds (baseball) (born 1953), pitcher for the Milwaukee Brewers
- Samuel S. Hinds (1875–1948), American actor
