= Thomas Amrhein =

Thomas Amrhein may refer to:

- Tom Amrhein (1911–1987), American soccer midfielder
- Thomas Amrhein (bobsleigh) (born 1989), Swiss bobsledder
