= George Popplein =

American baseball player (1840–1901)

- Outfielder/Third baseman
- Born: August 1840; Baltimore, Maryland
- Died: March 31, 1901 (aged 60); Baltimore, Maryland
- Batted: Unknown Threw: Unknown

MLB debut
- July 11, 1873, for the Baltimore Marylands

Last MLB appearance
- July 11, 1873, for the Baltimore Marylands

MLB statistics
- Hits: 0
- At bats: 4
- RBI: 0
- Stats at Baseball Reference

Teams
- Baltimore Marylands (1873)

George J. Popplein (August, 1840 – March 31, 1901) was an American baseball player who appeared in one professional game for the Baltimore Marylands during the 1873 season.

== Early life and baseball career ==
Popplein was born in Baltimore, Maryland in August of 1840. He had several brothers, some of whom played amateur baseball as well. In 1860, Popplein and his brother Andrew joined the Maryland Club, but quickly resigned and became members of the Pastime Club. According to Paul Batesel, Popplein was a member of the Pastimes beginning in 1861, made its first team in 1863, and remained with the club through 1871, while Peter Morris notes that he played only sporadically after 1867.

=== Professional game ===
On July 11, 1873, Popplein appeared at third base and center field for the Baltimore Marylands. He had no hits in four at-bats, and made one error in three fielding chances. According to Morris, it is likely that Popplein has been misidentified, and the player thought to be him was actually one of his brothers.

== Later life and death ==
Popplein worked manufacturing fertilizer and paint both during and after his baseball career. By 1890, he owned the Popplein Silicated Phosphate Company, where he worked as a chemist. Popplein died on March 31, 1901, of kidney disease. His son, George A., kept scorecards of turn-of-the-century Baltimore Orioles home games, which are collectively known as the Popplein Hoard and now in the collection of the Babe Ruth Museum.
