= Joe Kernan (baseball) =

American baseball player

- Utility player
- Born: Baltimore, Maryland, U.S.
- Batted: Unknown Threw: Unknown

MLB debut
- April 14, 1873, for the Baltimore Marylands

Last MLB appearance
- April 15, 1873, for the Baltimore Marylands

MLB statistics
- At bats: 8
- RBIs: 1
- Home Runs: 0
- Batting average: .375
- Stats at Baseball Reference

Teams
- National Association of Base Ball Players: Baltimore Marylands (1870); National Association of Professional BBP: Baltimore Marylands 1873

Joseph Kernan was an American professional baseball player. He played second base and center field in two games for the 1873 Baltimore Marylands. He was a Baltimore native like most of his Maryland teammates.

Kernan previously played for the Marylands in the second of their three professional seasons, 1870. While the team won 2 and lost 14 pro matches, he appeared at third base and second base in five of the eleven games on record, and he scored four runs, the lowest rate on the team.

Little is known about baseball in the 1870s, outside the leagues, but it seems sure that many NABBP clubs continued to operate; thus adult players outside the leagues, such as Joe Kernan, continued to play competitively. Kernan may have played for the Marylands between 1870 and 1873.
