= Red Woodhead =

American baseball player (1851–1881)

- Third baseman
- Born: July 9, 1851; Chelsea, Massachusetts
- Died: September 7, 1881 (aged 30); Boston, Massachusetts

MLB debut
- April 15, 1873, for the Baltimore Marylands

Last MLB appearance
- September 10, 1879, for the Syracuse Stars

MLB statistics
- Games played: 35
- Batting average: .160
- Hits: 21
- Stats at Baseball Reference

Teams
- Baltimore Marylands (1873); Syracuse Stars (1879)

James "Red" Woodhead (July 9, 1851 – September 7, 1881) was an American professional baseball player. He played one game for the 1873 Baltimore Marylands of the National Association, three seasons for the Manchesters of the International Association from 1877 to 1879, and one partial season for the Syracuse Stars of the National League in 1879. Woodhead died at the age of 30 in Boston, Massachusetts and is interred at the historic Bennington Street Burying Ground in East Boston.
