= John Sheppard (baseball) =

American baseball player

- Outfielder
- Born: Baltimore, Maryland
- Batted: Unknown Threw: Unknown

MLB debut
- June 27, 1873, for the Baltimore Marylands

Last MLB appearance
- July 11, 1873, for the Baltimore Marylands

MLB statistics
- At bats: 11
- RBIs: 0
- Home runs: 0
- Batting average: .000
- Stats at Baseball Reference

Teams
- Baltimore Marylands 1873

John Sheppard was an American professional baseball player, who played in three games for the Baltimore Marylands in 1873.
