= Ed Stratton =

American baseball player (1858–1900)

- Pitcher
- Born: 1858; Baltimore, Maryland
- Died: January 31, 1900 (aged 45–46); Baltimore, Maryland
- Batted: Unknown Threw: Unknown

MLB debut
- May 14, 1873, for the Baltimore Marylands

Last MLB appearance
- July 11, 1873, for the Baltimore Marylands

MLB statistics
- Win–loss record: 0–3
- Earned run average: 8.33
- Strikeouts: 0
- Stats at Baseball Reference

Teams
- Baltimore Marylands (1873)

William Edward Stratton (1854 – January 31, 1900) was an American professional baseball player, who played for the 1873 Baltimore Marylands team.
