= Bennington Street Burying Ground =

Historic cemetery in East Boston, Massachusetts

- U.S. National Register of Historic Places
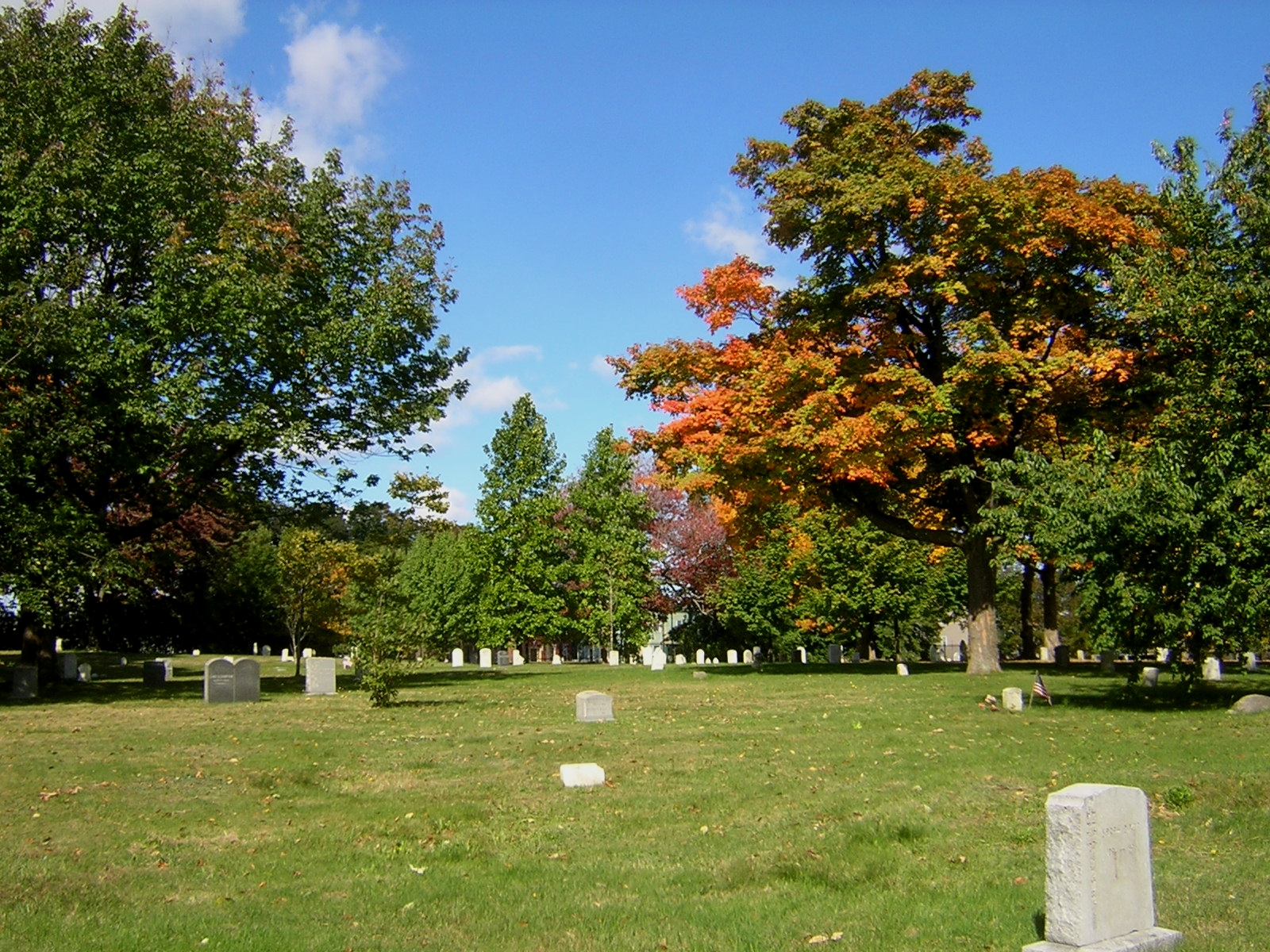
- View of the cemetery in 2009.
- Location: East Boston, Massachusetts
- Coordinates: 42°22′52″N 71°01′16″W
- Area: 3.6 acres (1.5 ha)
- Built: 1838
- NRHP reference No.: 02000548
- Added to NRHP: May 22, 2002

The Bennington Street Burying Ground is a historic cemetery on Bennington Street, between Swift St. and Harmony St., in East Boston, Massachusetts.

The cemetery was established in 1838, in a late version of the traditional rectilinear colonial cemetery, rather than the rural cemetery style that was then just beginning to come into vogue. The cemetery has more than 300 graves, the oldest dating to 1819 (probably a reburial from another location). The cemetery was listed on the National Register of Historic Places in 2002.

The professional baseball player Red Woodhead was interred at the cemetery in 1881.

== See also ==
- National Register of Historic Places listings in northern Boston, Massachusetts
