= Marcy McDonnell =

American baseball player (1852–1919)

- Pitcher
- Born: February 14, 1852; Baltimore, Maryland
- Died: April 3, 1916 (aged 64); Macdonaldton, Pennsylvania
- Batted: Unknown Threw: Unknown

National Association debut
- April 14, 1873, for the Baltimore Marylands

Last National Association appearance
- April 14, 1873, for the Baltimore Marylands

National Association statistics
- Win–loss record: 0–1
- Earned run average: 3.00
- Strikeouts: 0

Teams
- Baltimore Marylands (1873)

Marcy Richard McDonnell (February 14, 1852 – April 3, 1916) was an American professional baseball pitcher who played in one major league game for the Baltimore Marylands in 1873. Starting for Baltimore in their season opener on April 14, McDonnell gave up 18 hits and 24 runs in a 24–3 loss to Washington. In the field, he committed one error in five chances, and at the plate he had no hits in four at bats, but scored a run. McDonnell appeared in an old-timers game in 1895 and died in Macdonaldton, Pennsylvania on April 3, 1916.

McDonnell had no known first name and was identified incorrectly in baseball records as "McDoolan" until 2025, when the Society for American Baseball Research discovered his real name.
