= Frederick Ehlen =

American baseball player (1851–1934)

- Right fielder
- Born: September 12, 1851; Baltimore, Maryland
- Died: November 15, 1934 (aged 83); Baltimore, Maryland
- Batted: Unknown Threw: Unknown

debut
- April 14, 1873, for the Baltimore Marylands

Last appearance
- April 14, 1873, for the Baltimore Marylands

Career statistics
- Games played: 1
- At bats: 3
- Hits: 0
- Stats at Baseball Reference

Teams
- Baltimore Marylands (1873)

Frederick Ehlen (September 12, 1851 - November 15, 1934) was a Major League Baseball right fielder who played in one game for the Baltimore Marylands on April 14, 1873.
