= Mike Hooper (baseball) =

American baseball player (1850–1917)

Michael H. Hooper
- Outfielder
- Born: February 7, 1850; Baltimore, Maryland, U.S.
- Died: December 1, 1917 (aged 67); Baltimore, Maryland, U.S.
- Batted: Unknown Threw: Unknown

MLB debut
- June 27, 1873, for the Baltimore Marylands

Last MLB appearance
- July 11, 1873, for the Baltimore Marylands

MLB statistics
- At bats: 14
- RBI: 2
- Home runs: 0
- Batting average: .214
- Stats at Baseball Reference

Teams
- National Association of Base Ball Players Baltimore Marylands (1868–1870) National Association of Professional BBP Baltimore Marylands 1873

Michael H. Hooper (February 7, 1850 – December 1, 1917) was an American professional baseball player who played in three games for the Baltimore Marylands during the 1873 baseball season, his only playing time at the major league level. Previously he was an outfielder for the Maryland club at least 1868 to 1870, when he led the team in runs scored all three seasons. Maryland was one of the pioneer pro clubs when the National Association first permitted professional members in 1869.

Hooper was born in Baltimore, Maryland and died there at the age of 67.

== Sources ==
- Career statistics from Baseball Reference · Retrosheet
- Wright, Marshall (2000). The National Association of Base Ball Players, 1857-1870. Jefferson, NC: McFarland & Co. ISBN 0-7864-0779-4. Pages 199, 250, 304.
