= Meadows, Maryland =

Unincorporated community in Maryland, United States

Meadows
- Unincorporated community
- Location within the state of Maryland Meadows (the United States)
- Coordinates: 38°48′56″N 76°50′58″W
- Country: United States of America
- State: Maryland
- County: Prince George's
- Time zone: UTC-5 (Eastern (EST))
  - Summer (DST): UTC-4 (EDT)
- GNIS feature ID: 597737

Meadows is an unincorporated community located in Prince George's County, Maryland, United States, located near the east end of Joint Base Andrews.

== Notable person ==
- Ray Moore, baseball player.
