= William French (archdeacon) =

18th-century Anglican priest in Ireland

William French (1739-1790) was an 18th-century Anglican priest in Ireland.

French was born in County Dublin and educated at Trinity College Dublin. Lewis was Treasurer of Killaloe Cathedral from 1754 to 1760; and Archdeacon of Kilfenora from 1743 to 1767.
