= William French (merchant) =

- Born: 1732
- Died: 1802 (aged 69–70)
- Known for: Tobacco Merchant

William French was a tobacco merchant.

== Early life ==
French was born in 1732.

== Career as a merchant ==
As a tobacco merchant, French was involved in the Chesapeake trade, through multiple firms, including Spiers, Bowman & Co, in which French was a controlling partner. Alexander Spiers and John Bowman were his partners. The firm held stores along the James River.

His business was adversely affected by the disruption caused by the American War of Independence, and he was declared bankrupt in 1786.

He was one of the founder directors of the Glasgow Chamber of Commerce.

== Politics ==
French was provost of Glasgow between 1778 - 1780. He was also a Magistrate.

== Property ==
He owned the estate of Baillieston.

== Death ==
He was buried in the Ramshorn Cemetery, Glasgow, in 1832.
