= Wally Goldsmith =

American baseball player (1848–1915)

- Third baseman / Shortstop
- Born: October 1848; Baltimore, Maryland, U.S.
- Died: September 16, 1915 (aged 66); Washington, D.C., U.S.
- Batted: Unknown Threw: Unknown

MLB debut
- May 4, 1871, for the Fort Wayne Kekiongas

Last MLB appearance
- June 14, 1875, for the Keokuk Westerns

MLB statistics
- Games played: 42
- Batting average: .185
- Runs batted in: 18
- Stats at Baseball Reference

Teams
- National Association of Base Ball Players Baltimore Marylands (1868–1870) National Association of Professional BBP Fort Wayne Kekiongas (1871) Washington Olympics (1872) Baltimore Marylands (1873) Keokuk Westerns (1875)

Warren M. Goldsmith (October 1848 – September 16, 1915) was an American professional baseball player in the 1860s and 1870s. He played third base, shortstop, second base, and catcher in the National Association, three times a regular player on one of the weakest teams in that first professional league.

Born in Baltimore, Goldsmith moved from the local Enterprise club to the Maryland late in the 1868 season, probably just short of his 20th birthday. Maryland was the strongest team in the city but it lost badly to Enterprise on September 1 (15–36) before winning twice, 17-15 and 33–18, in the middle of the month. Goldsmith evidently won a "job" in those three matches.

Goldsmith was a marginal player in the National Association, able to play at that level only with teams that would not survive. He played all 19 games for Kekionga in 1871, all nine for Olympic in 1872, and all 13 for Western in 1875. In 1873 he played one game for his old Maryland club, which dropped out after playing six games against Baltimore and Washington opposition.
