= Bill Smith (baseball manager) =

American baseball player and manager

- Player-manager / Center fielder / Catcher / Second baseman / Umpire
- Born: Unknown; Baltimore, Maryland
- Died: Unknown
- Batted: Unknown Threw: Unknown

MLB debut
- April 14, 1873, for the Baltimore Marylands

Last MLB appearance
- July 11, 1873, for the Baltimore Marylands

MLB statistics
- Batting average: .174
- Home runs: 0
- Runs batted in: 1
- Stats at Baseball Reference

Teams
- As player: Baltimore Marylands (1873); As manager: Baltimore Marylands (1873)

William J. Smith (born in Baltimore, Maryland) was a player-manager, center fielder, catcher and second baseman for the 1873 Baltimore Marylands during their lone season in the National Association of Professional Base Ball Players. The Marylands went 0–6 for the season and Smith's record was 0–5. As a player, he batted .174 and committed three errors (two as a catcher and three as a second baseman) in eight total chances for a fielding percentage of .625 over six games while splitting time at center field, catcher, and second base. Later, on July 12, 1886, he was credited as making an appearance as the umpire for a game between the Detroit Wolverines and the Kansas City Cowboys.
