= William Aden French =

American novelist

William Aden French (1892–1980) was an American newspaper publisher and author.

== Biography ==
He grew up in Tennessee before traveling in a covered wagon to rural Shannon County, Missouri, at the age of 14.

French began working for the local paper the Current Wave in Eminence, which he acquired in 1937 and continued to edit and publish until 1962. During his career, French would also come own and publish the Winona Shannon County Democrat and Birch Tree Shannon County Herald.

In addition to his newspaper publishing, French also became an accomplished poet and novelist whose work focused mostly on themes of Regionalism set in the rural Ozarks. His novels include: Driftwood of the Current (1942), the story of the disastrous Winona flood of 1895; Oakley of the Ozarks (1942), a tale of young love among the hills and valleys; Wrestling the Wilderness (1943) a drama set in the north woods of Maine; and Strength of the Hills (1944), a drama set around the development of a copper mine in Shannon County.

On July 2, 2012, the Missouri Press Association announced that French was going to be inducted into their Newspaper Hall of Fame at the University of Missouri's School of Journalism.
