= Tommy Johns =

American baseball player (1851–1927)

- Outfielder
- Born: September 7, 1851; Baltimore, Maryland, U.S.
- Died: April 13, 1927 (aged 75); Baltimore, Maryland, U.S.
- Batted: Unknown Threw: Unknown

MLB debut
- May 14, 1873, for the Baltimore Marylands

Last MLB appearance
- May 14, 1873, for the Baltimore Marylands

MLB statistics
- Games played: 1
- At bats: 4
- Hits: 0

Teams
- Baltimore Marylands (1873)

Thomas Pearce Johns (September 7, 1851 – April 13, 1927) was an American professional baseball player who was an outfielder in the National Association. Johns played for the Baltimore Marylands in 1873. He only played in one game in his one-year career, having no hits in four at-bats.

Johns was born and died in Baltimore. His brother, Richard Johns, umpired one National Association game in 1873.
