= Bill French (baseball) =

American baseball player (1849–1893)

- Infielder/Outfielder
- Born: 1849; Baltimore, Maryland
- Died: 1893 (aged 43–44); Baltimore, Maryland
- Batted: Unknown Threw: Unknown

MLB debut
- April 14, 1873, for the Baltimore Marylands

Last MLB appearance
- June 30, 1873, for the Baltimore Marylands

MLB statistics
- At bats: 18
- RBIs: 1
- Home runs: 0
- Batting average: .222
- Stats at Baseball Reference

Teams
- Baltimore Marylands (1873)

William Henry French (1849 – May 31, 1893) was an American professional baseball player, who played in five games for the Baltimore Marylands in 1873.
