= Marty Simpson (baseball) =

American baseball player

- Second baseman
- Born: July 11, 1855; Baltimore, Maryland, U.S.
- Died: June 8, 1940 (aged 84); Baltimore, Maryland, U.S.
- Batted: Unknown Threw: Unknown

MLB debut
- May 14, 1873, for the Baltimore Marylands

Last MLB appearance
- July 11, 1873, for the Baltimore Marylands

MLB statistics
- At bats: 15
- Home runs: 0
- Runs batted in: 2
- Batting average: .133
- Stats at Baseball Reference

Teams
- Baltimore Marylands (1873)

Louis Martin Simpson (July 11, 1855 – June 6, 1940) was an American professional baseball player who played in four games during the 1873 season for the Baltimore Marylands.
