= Ray Moore (baseball) =

American baseball player (1926–1995)

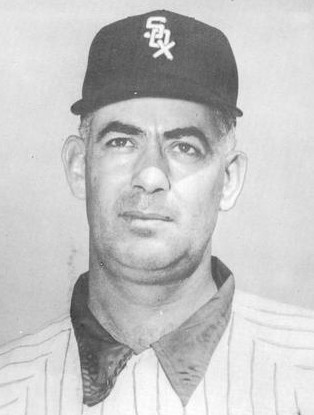
- Pitcher
- Born: June 1, 1926; Meadows, Maryland, U.S.
- Died: March 2, 1995 (aged 68); Clinton, Maryland, U.S.
- Batted: Right Threw: Right

MLB debut
- August 1, 1952, for the Brooklyn Dodgers

Last MLB appearance
- September 3, 1963, for the Minnesota Twins

MLB statistics
- Win–loss record: 63–59
- Earned run average: 4.06
- Strikeouts: 612
- Stats at Baseball Reference

Teams
- Brooklyn Dodgers (1952–1953); Baltimore Orioles (1955–1957); Chicago White Sox (1958–1960); Washington Senators / Minnesota Twins (1960–1963)

Raymond Leroy Moore (June 1, 1926 – March 2, 1995) was an American right-handed pitcher in Major League Baseball who played for the Brooklyn Dodgers, Baltimore Orioles, Chicago White Sox, and Washington Senators / Minnesota Twins from 1952 to 1963.

A fastballing right-hander, Moore was nicknamed "Farmer" and "Old Blue". He was 6 ft 1 in (1.85 m) tall and he weighed 205 pounds (93 kg).

== Baseball career ==
Born in Meadows, Maryland, Moore was originally signed by the Dodgers in 1947. He spent almost six full years in the minors, and made his major league debut on August 1, 1952 at the age of 26.

=== Orioles and White Sox ===
Moore, who today wouldn't be considered a "control specialist" as he walked as many as 112 batters in a season, was used both as a reliever and starter in his career, starting mostly during his time with the Orioles, to whom he'd been traded for Chico García on October 8, 1954. He also started a large number of games one year with the White Sox. He was involved in a blockbuster deal when he was sent to the White Sox, being traded with Tito Francona and Billy Goodman for Hall of Famer Larry Doby, Jim Marshall, Russ Heman and Jack Harshman.

Perhaps his best season as a starter was 1956, while with the Orioles. That year, Moore posted a 12–7 record with a 4.18 ERA. He also completed nine games that season, a career high. He also had the ninth best hits allowed per nine innings ratio in 1956, with a ratio of 7.83:9.

On June 28, 1957, Moore threw the White Sox' fourth consecutive shutout, which set an American League record. Overall that year, he went 11–13 with a 3.72 ERA.

Moore saw the only postseason action of his career as his White Sox battled the Los Angeles Dodgers in the 1959 World Series. Moore only appeared in one inning in the World Series, striking out one and giving up a hit-a home run by Chuck Essegian.

=== Senators/Twins ===
He was purchased from the White Sox by the Senators in June of 1960, and it was with the Senators and Twins (the Senators relocated to Minnesota after 1960) that he became one of the better closers in the league, ranking from 1960 to 1962 third, fourth and seventh in the league in saves, respectively.

Moore finished up his career in 1963, playing his final game on September 6 against the Chicago White Sox, striking out the last batter he faced – Cam Carreon. Overall, he was 63–59 with 560 walks and 612 strikeouts in 1072 2/3 innings. He completed 24 of the 105 games he started, shutting out five of them. Overall, he appeared in 365 games, saving 46.

Moore had a total of six home runs in his career, with as many as three in a season. In 1956, he hit .271 in 70 at-bats. Overall, his batting average was .187 with 56 hits in 299 at-bats. He struck out 99 times and walked seven times in his entire career.

He had a .946 fielding percentage in his career.

Moore died in 1995 in Clinton, Maryland. He is buried at Cedar Hill Cemetery in Suitland, Maryland.
