= Sam Hinds (baseball) =

American baseball player (1953–2019)

- Pitcher
- Born: July 11, 1953; Frederick, Maryland, U.S.
- Died: September 19, 2019 (aged 66); Hanford, California, U.S.
- Batted: Right Threw: Right

MLB debut
- May 21, 1977, for the Milwaukee Brewers

Last MLB appearance
- September 4, 1977, for the Milwaukee Brewers

MLB statistics
- Win–loss record: 0–3
- Earned run average: 4.73
- Strikeouts: 46
- Stats at Baseball Reference

Teams
- Milwaukee Brewers (1977)

Samuel Russell Hinds (July 11, 1953 – September 19, 2019) was a pitcher for the Milwaukee Brewers. He was selected in the 35th round of the 1971 amateur draft by the St. Louis Cardinals, but never played for them. After graduating from Broward Junior College, he would go on to be signed in 1974 by the Brewers as an undrafted amateur free agent. He made his major league debut in 1977 against the Boston Red Sox. He lost the outing, and would make only two more starts before being demoted to triple A in 1978, then double A in 1979. He finished playing baseball after the 1979 season, having made only three starts in his major league career. Hinds died on September 19, 2019, in Hanford, California.
