= Tom Amrhein =

American soccer player (1911–1987)

Personal information
- Full name: Thomas Phillip Amrhein
- Date of birth: March 9, 1911
- Place of birth: Baltimore, Maryland, US
- Date of death: September 3, 1987 (aged 76)
- Place of death: Baltimore, Maryland, US
- Position: Midfielder

International career
| Years | Team | Apps | (Gls) |
- United States

Thomas Amrhein (March 9, 1911 – September 3, 1987) was an American soccer midfielder. He spent thirteen seasons in the American Soccer League and was a member of the American team at the 1934 FIFA World Cup. He was born in Baltimore, Maryland.

== Professional career ==
Amrhein began his professional career with Baltimore Canton of the American Soccer League in 1934 and played with them through the 1946–1947 season. In 1936, Canton became known as the Baltimore S.C. In 1940, Baltimore S.C. shared the National Challenge Cup title with Chicago Sparta after the two played to 0-0 and 2-2 ties. In 1942, the team became known as the Baltimore Americans. Under this name, Amrhein and his teammates won the 1945-1946 ASL championship.

== National team ==
Amrhein was in the U.S. team for the 1934 FIFA World Cup, but did play in the only U.S. game of the cup, a 7–1 loss to eventual champion Italy.

Amrhein was inducted into the Maryland Soccer Hall of Fame in 1981.

Amrhein died on September 3, 1987, at the age of 76.
