= Baltimore Marylands =

Professional baseball team

The Baltimore Marylands were a short-lived professional baseball team that existed in the 1873 National Association season. Their existence consisted of a six games from April 14 to July 11, and finished with a win–loss record of 0–6. In those six games, two of which were against the Washington Blue Legs and four versus the Baltimore Canaries, the team allowed 152 runs to score, while scoring 26 for themselves. The team was managed by Bill Smith, who also played in the outfield and at catcher. They played their one and only home game on April 14, at Madison Avenue Grounds, and officially folded after the July 11, 1873 game.

== See also ==
- 1873 Baltimore Marylands season
