= 1932 Boston Red Sox season =

Major League Baseball season

1932 Boston Red Sox
- League: American League
- Ballpark: Fenway Park
- City: Boston, Massachusetts
- Record: 43–111 (.279)
- League place: 8th
- Owners: J. A. Robert Quinn
- Managers: Shano Collins and Marty McManus
- Radio: WNAC (Fred Hoey)
- Stats: ESPN.com; Baseball Reference

The 1932 Boston Red Sox season was the 32nd season in the franchise's Major League Baseball (MLB) history. The team's home field was Fenway Park. The Red Sox finished last in the eight-team American League (AL) with a record of 43 wins and 111 losses, 64 games behind the New York Yankees, who went on to win the 1932 World Series.

The Red Sox initially played their Sunday home games at Braves Field this season, as had been the case since the team's 1929 season, due to Fenway being close to a house of worship. The team played six home games at Braves Field during the 1932 season; an early-season Tuesday doubleheader against the Yankees, and four Sunday games. A new Massachusetts law enacted in late May allowed the team to play at Fenway on Sundays. The final game the Red Sox ever played at Braves Field was on May 29, when they lost the second game of a doubleheader to the Philadelphia Athletics. The Red Sox' first Sunday home game at Fenway was played on July 3, a 13–2 loss to the Yankees.

The 1932 team set a franchise record for the lowest winning percentage in a season, .279, which still stands. The team allowed 915 runs while only scoring 566, a run differential of -349, the second-worst in MLB's modern era (since 1900).

== Regular season ==
=== Season standings ===
American League
Team	W	L	Pct.	GB	Home	Road
New York Yankees	107	47	.695	—	62‍–‍15	45‍–‍32
Philadelphia Athletics	94	60	.610	13	51‍–‍26	43‍–‍34
Washington Senators	93	61	.604	14	51‍–‍26	42‍–‍35
Cleveland Indians	87	65	.572	19	43‍–‍33	44‍–‍32
Detroit Tigers	76	75	.503	29½	42‍–‍34	34‍–‍41
St. Louis Browns	63	91	.409	44	33‍–‍42	30‍–‍49
Chicago White Sox	49	102	.325	56½	28‍–‍49	21‍–‍53
Boston Red Sox	43	111	.279	64	27‍–‍50	16‍–‍61

=== Record vs. opponents ===
1932 American League record Sources:
Team	BOS	CWS	CLE	DET	NYY	PHA	SLB	WSH
Boston	—	12–10	4–18	6–16	5–17	4–18	7–15	5–17
Chicago	10–12	—	7–14–1	8–12	5–17	7–15	8–14	4–18
Cleveland	18–4	14–7–1	—	11–10	7–15	10–12	16–6	11–11
Detroit	16–6	12–8	10–11	—	5–17–2	7–15	15–7	11–11
New York	17–5	17–5	15–7	17–5–2	—	14–8	16–6	11–11
Philadelphia	18–4	15–7	12–10	15–7	8–14	—	16–6	10–12
St. Louis	15–7	14–8	6–16	7–15	6–16	6–16	—	9–13
Washington	17–5	18–4	11–11	11–11	11–11	12–10	13–9	—

=== Opening Day lineup ===
12	Jack Rothrock	LF
4	Hal Rhyne	SS
3	Marty McManus	2B
15	Earl Webb	RF
7	Urbane Pickering	3B
1	Al Van Camp	1B
14	Tom Oliver	CF
9	Charlie Berry	C
18	Danny MacFayden	P

=== Roster ===
1932 Boston Red Sox
Roster
Pitchers: 25 Ivy Andrews; 21 Pete Appleton; 31 Larry Boerner; 25 Pete Donohue; 20 Ed Durham; 1 Ed Gallagher; 24 Bob Kline; 25 Regis Leheny; 22 Hod Lisenbee; 18 Danny MacFayden; 16 Jud McLaughlin; 16 Gordon McNaughton; 27 John Michaels; 19 Wilcy Moore; 19 Gordon Rhodes; 21 Jack Russell; 26 Bob Weiland; 6 Johnny Welch	Catchers: 9 Charlie Berry; 10 Ed Connolly; 11 Hank Patterson; 11 Howie Storie; 8 Bennie Tate; Infielders: 15 Dale Alexander; 3 Marty McManus; 5 Marv Olson; 7 Urbane Pickering; 28 Johnny Reder; 4 Hal Rhyne; 2 Andy Spognardi; 1 Al Van Camp; 2 Rabbit Warstler	Outfielders: 18 Roy Johnson; 9 Smead Jolley; 14 Tom Oliver; 12 Jack Rothrock; 17 George Stumpf; 12 Johnny Watwood; 15 Earl Webb; Other batters: 16 Johnny Lucas; 6 Otto Miller	Managers: 31 Shano Collins; 3 Marty McManus; Coaches: 32 Rudy Hulswitt

== Player stats ==
=== Batting ===
==== Starters by position ====
Note: Pos = Position; G = Games played; AB = At bats; H = Hits; Avg. = Batting average; HR = Home runs; RBI = Runs batted in

Pos	Player	G	AB	H	Avg.	HR	RBI
C	Bennie Tate	81	273	67	.245	2	26
1B	Dale Alexander	101	376	140	.372	8	56
2B	Marv Olson	115	403	100	.248	0	25
SS	Rabbit Warstler	115	388	82	.211	0	34
3B	Urbane Pickering	132	457	119	.260	2	40
OF	Tom Oliver	122	455	120	.264	0	37
OF	Smead Jolley	137	531	164	.309	18	99
OF	Roy Johnson	94	349	104	.298	11	47

==== Other batters ====
Note: G = Games played; AB = At bats; H = Hits; Avg. = Batting average; HR = Home runs; RBI = Runs batted in

Player	G	AB	H	Avg.	HR	RBI
Marty McManus	93	302	71	.235	5	24
Johnny Watwood	95	266	66	.248	0	30
Ed Connolly	75	222	50	.225	0	21
Hal Rhyne	71	207	47	.227	0	14
Earl Webb	52	192	54	.281	5	27
George Stumpf	79	169	34	.201	1	18
Al Van Camp	34	103	23	.223	0	6
Jack Rothrock	12	48	10	.208	0	0
Johnny Reder	17	37	5	.135	0	3
Andy Spognardi	17	34	10	.294	0	1
Charlie Berry	10	32	6	.188	0	6
Howie Storie	6	8	3	.375	0	0
Otis L. Miller	2	2	0	.000	0	0
Hank Patterson	1	1	0	.000	0	0
Johnny Lucas	1	1	0	.000	0	0

=== Pitching ===
==== Starting pitchers ====
Note: G = Games pitched; IP = Innings pitched; W = Wins; L = Losses; ERA = Earned run average; SO = Strikeouts

Player	G	IP	W	L	ERA	SO
Ivy Andrews	25	141.2	8	6	3.81	30
Gordon Rhodes	12	79.1	1	8	5.11	22
Danny MacFayden	12	77.2	1	10	5.10	29

==== Other pitchers ====
Note: G = Games pitched; IP = Innings pitched; W = Wins; L = Losses; ERA = Earned run average; SO = Strikeouts

Player	G	IP	W	L	ERA	SO
Bob Weiland	43	195.2	6	16	4.51	63
Ed Durham	34	175.1	6	13	3.80	52
Bob Kline	47	172.0	11	13	5.28	31
John Michaels	28	80.2	1	6	5.13	16
Hod Lisenbee	19	73.1	0	4	5.65	13
Johnny Welch	20	72.1	4	6	5.23	26
Larry Boerner	21	61.0	0	4	5.02	19
Pete Appleton	11	46.0	0	3	4.11	15
Jack Russell	11	39.2	1	7	6.81	7
Ed Gallagher	9	23.2	0	3	12.55	6
Gordon McNaughton	6	21.0	0	1	6.43	6
Pete Donohue	4	12.2	0	1	7.82	1

==== Relief pitchers ====
Note: G = Games pitched; W = Wins; L = Losses; SV = Saves; ERA = Earned run average; SO = Strikeouts

Player	G	W	L	SV	ERA	SO
Wilcy Moore	37	4	10	4	5.23	28
Regis Leheny	2	0	0	0	16.88	1
Jud McLaughlin	1	0	0	0	15.00	0

== Farm system ==
Level	Team	League	Manager
B	Hazleton Mountaineers	New York–Pennsylvania League	Jake Pitler
B	Wilmington Pirates	Piedmont League	Hal Weafer and Tweet Walsh

== See also ==
- List of Boston Red Sox team records
