= List of Major League Baseball players (P) =

The following is a list of Major League Baseball players, retired or active. As of the end of the 2011 season, there have been 833 players with a last name that begins with P who have been on a major league roster at some point.

== P ==
For reasons of space, this list has been split into two pages:

- Charlie Pabor through Monte Pfyl
- Bill Phebus through Tim Pyznarski
