= List of Major League Baseball players (Ph–Pz) =

The following is a list of Major League Baseball players, retired or active.

== Ph through Py ==
Name	Debut	Final game	Position	Teams	Ref
Bill Phebus	September 6, 1936	May 16, 1938	Pitcher	Washington Senators	
Art Phelan	June 25, 1910	October 3, 1915	Third baseman	Cincinnati Reds, Chicago Cubs	
Dan Phelan	April 18, 1890	May 11, 1890	First baseman	Louisville Colonels	
Dick Phelan	April 17, 1884	October 3, 1885	Second baseman	Baltimore Monumentals, Buffalo Bisons (NL), St. Louis Maroons	
Babe Phelps	September 17, 1931	September 27, 1942	Catcher	Washington Senators, Chicago Cubs, Brooklyn Dodgers, Pittsburgh Pirates	
Cord Phelps	June 8, 2011		Second baseman	Cleveland Indians	
Ed Phelps	September 3, 1902	August 15, 1913	Catcher	Pittsburgh Pirates, Cincinnati Reds, St. Louis Cardinals, Brooklyn Dodgers/Superbas	
Josh Phelps	June 13, 2000		Designated hitter	Toronto Blue Jays, Cleveland Indians, Tampa Bay Devil Rays, New York Yankees, Pittsburgh Pirates, St. Louis Cardinals	
Ken Phelps	September 20, 1980	September 8, 1990	Designated hitter	Kansas City Royals, Montreal Expos, Seattle Mariners, New York Yankees, Oakland Athletics, Cleveland Indians	
Nealy Phelps	July 1, 1871	August 10, 1876	Outfielder	Fort Wayne Kekiongas, New York Mutuals, Philadelphia Athletics (1860–76)	
Ray Phelps	April 23, 1930	June 28, 1936	Pitcher	Brooklyn Robins/Dodgers, Chicago White Sox	
Tommy Phelps	March 31, 2003	July 7, 2005	Pitcher	Florida Marlins, Milwaukee Brewers	
Travis Phelps	April 19, 2001	September 11, 2004	Pitcher	Tampa Bay Devil Rays, Milwaukee Brewers	
Dave Philley	September 6, 1941	August 6, 1962	Outfielder	Chicago White Sox, Philadelphia Athletics, Cleveland Indians, Baltimore Orioles, Detroit Tigers, Philadelphia Phillies, San Francisco Giants, Boston Red Sox	
Deacon Phillippe	April 21, 1899	August 13, 1911	Pitcher	Louisville Colonels, Pittsburgh Pirates	
Adolfo Phillips	September 2, 1964	May 16, 1972	Outfielder	Philadelphia Phillies, Chicago Cubs, Montreal Expos, Cleveland Indians	
Andy Phillips	September 14, 2004		First baseman	New York Yankees, New York Mets, Cincinnati Reds	
Bill Phillips (1B)	May 1, 1879	October 14, 1888	First baseman	Cleveland Blues (NL), Brooklyn Grays, Kansas City Cowboys (AA)	
Bill Phillips (P)	August 11, 1890	September 22, 1903	Pitcher	Pittsburgh Alleghenys, Cincinnati Reds	
Brandon Phillips	September 13, 2002		Second baseman	Cleveland Indians, Cincinnati Reds	
Bubba Phillips	April 30, 1955	September 18, 1964	Third baseman	Detroit Tigers, Chicago White Sox, Cleveland Indians	
Buz Phillips	August 5, 1930	September 22, 1930	Pitcher	Philadelphia Phillies	
Dee Phillips	July 19, 1942	September 22, 1946	Utility infielder	Cincinnati Reds, Boston Braves	
Dick Phillips	April 15, 1962	September 25, 1966	First baseman	San Francisco Giants, Washington Senators (1961–1971)	
Ed Phillips	April 9, 1970	August 29, 1970	Pitcher	Boston Red Sox	
Eddie Phillips (C)	May 4, 1924	September 29, 1935	Catcher	Boston Braves, Detroit Tigers, Pittsburgh Pirates, New York Yankees, Washington Senators, Cleveland Indians	
Eddie Phillips (PR)	September 10, 1953	September 26, 1953	Pinch runner	St. Louis Cardinals	
Heath Phillips	September 5, 2007		Pitcher	Chicago White Sox	
J. R. Phillips	September 3, 1993	October 3, 1999	First baseman	San Francisco Giants, Philadelphia Phillies, Houston Astros, Colorado Rockies	
Jack Phillips (P)	July 13, 1945	July 31, 1945	Pitcher	New York Giants	
Jack Phillips (1B)	August 22, 1947	April 25, 1957	First baseman	New York Yankees, Pittsburgh Pirates, Detroit Tigers	
Jason Phillips (P)	April 5, 1999	May 24, 2003	Pitcher	Pittsburgh Pirates, Cleveland Indians	
Jason Phillips (C)	September 19, 2001	July 18, 2007	Catcher	New York Mets, Los Angeles Dodgers, Toronto Blue Jays	
Kyle Phillips	September 14, 2009		Catcher	Toronto Blue Jays, San Diego Padres	
Marr Phillips	May 1, 1884	July 25, 1890	Shortstop	Indianapolis Hoosiers (AA), Detroit Wolverines, Pittsburgh Alleghenys, Rochester Broncos	
Mike Phillips	April 15, 1973	June 12, 1983	Utility infielder	San Francisco Giants, New York Mets, St. Louis Cardinals, San Diego Padres, Montreal Expos	
Paul Phillips	September 9, 2004		Catcher	Kansas City Royals, Chicago White Sox, Colorado Rockies	
Red Phillips	July 24, 1934	September 23, 1936	Pitcher	Detroit Tigers	
Taylor Phillips	June 8, 1956	September 6, 1963	Pitcher	Milwaukee Braves, Chicago Cubs, Philadelphia Phillies, Chicago White Sox	
Tom Phillips	September 13, 1915	July 10, 1922	Pitcher	St. Louis Browns, Cleveland Indians, Washington Senators	
Tony Phillips	May 10, 1982	August 15, 1999	Utility player	Oakland Athletics, Detroit Tigers, California Angels, Chicago White Sox, Anaheim Angels, Toronto Blue Jays, New York Mets	
Zach Phillips	August 31, 2011		Pitcher	Baltimore Orioles	
Tom Phoebus	September 15, 1966	October 2, 1972	Pitcher	Baltimore Orioles, San Diego Padres, Chicago Cubs	
Steve Phoenix	July 30, 1994	August 6, 1995	Pitcher	Oakland Athletics	
Bill Phyle	September 17, 1898	September 15, 1906	Utility player	Chicago Orphans, San Francisco Giants, St. Louis Cardinals	
Adam Piatt	April 24, 2000	September 23, 2003	Outfielder	Oakland Athletics, Tampa Bay Devil Rays	
Doug Piatt	June 11, 1991	October 6, 1991	Pitcher	Montreal Expos	
Wiley Piatt	April 22, 1898	August 1, 1903	Pitcher	Philadelphia Phillies, Philadelphia Athletics, Chicago White Stockings (AL), Boston Beaneaters	
Mike Piazza	September 1, 1992	September 30, 2007	Catcher	Los Angeles Dodgers, Florida Marlins, New York Mets, San Diego Padres, Oakland Athletics	
Rob Picciolo	April 9, 1977	October 6, 1985	Shortstop	Oakland Athletics, Milwaukee Brewers, California Angels	
Nick Picciuto	May 11, 1945	September 30, 1945	Third baseman	Philadelphia Phillies	
Hipólito Pichardo	April 21, 1992	May 7, 2002	Pitcher	Boston Red Sox, Kansas City Royals, Houston Astros	
Ron Piché	May 30, 1960	September 26, 1966	Pitcher	Milwaukee Braves, California Angels, St. Louis Cardinals	
Val Picinich	July 25, 1916	August 28, 1933	Catcher	Philadelphia Athletics, Washington Senators, Boston Red Sox, Cincinnati Reds, Brooklyn Robins/Dodgers, Pittsburgh Pirates	
Charlie Pick	September 20, 1914	August 13, 1920	Second baseman	Washington Senators, Philadelphia Athletics, Chicago Cubs, Boston Braves	
Eddie Pick	September 13, 1923	September 8, 1927	Third baseman	Cincinnati Reds, Chicago Cubs	
Calvin Pickering	September 12, 1998	April 21, 2005	First baseman	Baltimore Orioles, Cincinnati Reds, Boston Red Sox, Kansas City Royals	
Ollie Pickering	August 9, 1896	October 8, 1908	Outfielder	Louisville Colonels, Cleveland Spiders, Cleveland Blues (AL)/Bronchos, Philadelphia Athletics, St. Louis Browns, Washington Senators	
Urbane Pickering	April 18, 1931	September 25, 1931	Third baseman	Boston Red Sox	
Charlie Pickett	June 21, 1910	June 24, 1910	Pitcher	St. Louis Cardinals	
Dave Pickett	July 21, 1898	August 5, 1898	Outfielder	Boston Beaneaters	
John Pickett	June 6, 1889	June 1, 1892	Second baseman	Kansas City Cowboys (AA), Philadelphia Quakers (PL), Baltimore Orioles (19th century)	
Ricky Pickett	April 28, 1998	May 5, 1998	Pitcher	Arizona Diamondbacks	
Kevin Pickford	May 16, 2002	July 21, 2002	Pitcher	San Diego Padres	
Clarence Pickrel	April 22, 1933	June 12, 1934	Pitcher	Philadelphia Phillies, Boston Braves	
Ty Pickup	April 30, 1918	April 30, 1918	Outfielder	Philadelphia Phillies	
Jeff Pico	May 31, 1988	September 9, 1990	Pitcher	Chicago Cubs	
Mario Picone	September 27, 1947	June 24, 1954	Pitcher	New York Giants, Cincinnati Redlegs	
Félix Pie	April 17, 2007		Outfielder	Chicago Cubs, Baltimore Orioles	
Al Piechota	May 7, 1940	April 26, 1941	Pitcher	Boston Bees/Braves	
Jorge Piedra	August 7, 2004	August 10, 2006	Outfielder	Colorado Rockies	
Cy Pieh	September 6, 1913	September 25, 1915	Pitcher	New York Yankees	
Billy Pierce	June 1, 1945	October 3, 1964	Pitcher	Detroit Tigers, Chicago White Sox, San Francisco Giants	
Ed Pierce	September 6, 1992	September 12, 1992	Pitcher	Kansas City Royals	
George Pierce	April 16, 1912	May 19, 1917	Pitcher	Chicago Cubs, St. Louis Cardinals	
Gracie Pierce	May 2, 1882	August 1, 1884	Second baseman	Louisville Eclipse, Baltimore Orioles (19th century), Columbus Buckeyes, New York Gothams, New York Metropolitans	
Jack Pierce	April 27, 1973	September 12, 1975	First baseman	Atlanta Braves, Detroit Tigers	
Jeff Pierce	April 26, 1995	May 24, 1995	Pitcher	Boston Red Sox	
Maury Pierce	April 23, 1884	April 24, 1884	Third baseman	Washington Nationals (UA)	
Ray Pierce	May 12, 1924	September 16, 1926	Pitcher	Chicago Cubs, Philadelphia Phillies	
Tony Pierce	April 16, 1967	June 21, 1968	Pitcher	Kansas City/Oakland Athletics	
Andy Piercy	May 12, 1881	June 30, 1881	Utility infielder	Chicago White Stockings	
Bill Piercy	October 3, 1917	August 16, 1926	Pitcher	New York Yankees, Boston Red Sox, Chicago Cubs	
Marino Pieretti	April 19, 1945	October 1, 1950	Pitcher	Washington Senators, Chicago White Sox, Cleveland Indians	
Al Pierotti	August 9, 1920	April 24, 1921	Pitcher	Boston Braves	
Juan Pierre	August 7, 2000		Outfielder	Colorado Rockies, Florida Marlins, Chicago Cubs, Los Angeles Dodgers, Chicago White Sox	
Bill Pierro	July 17, 1950	September 19, 1950	Pitcher	Pittsburgh Pirates	
Jimmy Piersall	September 7, 1950	May 1, 1967	Outfielder	Boston Red Sox, Cleveland Indians, Washington Senators (1961–1971), New York Mets, Los Angeles/California Angels	
Chris Piersoll	August 31, 2001	October 7, 2001	Pitcher	Cincinnati Reds	
Dave Pierson	April 25, 1876	October 9, 1876	Utility player	Cincinnati Reds (1876–1880)	
Dick Pierson	June 23, 1885	June 25, 1885	Second baseman	New York Metropolitans	
William Pierson	July 4, 1918	May 2, 1924	Pitcher	Philadelphia Athletics	
A. J. Pierzynski	September 9, 1998		Catcher	Minnesota Twins, San Francisco Giants, Chicago White Sox	
Tony Piet	August 15, 1931	October 2, 1938	Second baseman	Pittsburgh Pirates, Cincinnati Reds, Chicago White Sox, Detroit Tigers	
Sandy Piez	April 17, 1914	October 6, 1914	Outfielder	New York Giants	
Joe Pignatano	April 28, 1957	September 30, 1962	Catcher	Brooklyn/Los Angeles Dodgers, Kansas City Athletics, San Francisco Giants, New York Mets	
Carmen Pignatiello	August 16, 2007		Pitcher	Chicago Cubs	
Israel Pike	August 27, 1877	August 27, 1877	Outfielder	Hartford Dark Blues	
Jess Pike	April 18, 1946	May 18, 1946	Outfielder	New York Giants	
Lip Pike	May 9, 1871	July 28, 1887	Outfielder	Troy Haymakers, Baltimore Canaries, Hartford Dark Blues, St. Louis Brown Stockings, Cincinnati Reds (1876–1880), Providence Grays, Worcester Ruby Legs, New York Metropolitans	
George Piktuzis	April 25, 1956	April 28, 1956	Pitcher	Chicago Cubs	
Al Pilarcik	July 13, 1956	September 24, 1961	Outfielder	Kansas City Athletics, Baltimore Orioles, Chicago White Sox	
Brett Pill	September 6, 2011		First baseman	San Francisco Giants	
Duane Pillette	July 19, 1949	September 16, 1956	Pitcher	New York Yankees, St. Louis Browns, Baltimore Orioles, Philadelphia Phillies	
Herman Pillette	July 30, 1917	September 28, 1924	Pitcher	Cincinnati Reds, Detroit Tigers	
Squiz Pillion	August 20, 1915	August 26, 1915	Pitcher	Philadelphia Athletics	
Andy Pilney	June 12, 1936	June 26, 1936	Pinch hitter	Boston Bees	
Horacio Piña	August 14, 1968	October 1, 1978	Pitcher	Cleveland Indians, Washington Senators (1961–1971), Texas Rangers, Oakland Athletics, Chicago Cubs, California Angels, Philadelphia Phillies	
Manny Piña	August 3, 2011		Catcher	Kansas City Royals	
Luis Pineda	August 4, 2001	June 30, 2002	Pitcher	Detroit Tigers, Cincinnati Reds	
Michael Pineda	April 5, 2011		Pitcher	Seattle Mariners	
Joel Piñeiro	August 8, 2000		Pitcher	Seattle Mariners, Boston Red Sox, St. Louis Cardinals, Los Angeles Angels of Anaheim	
Babe Pinelli	August 3, 1918	June 17, 1927	Third baseman	Chicago White Sox, Detroit Tigers, Cincinnati Reds	
Lou Piniella	September 4, 1964	June 16, 1984	Outfielder	Baltimore Orioles, Cleveland Indians, Kansas City Royals, New York Yankees	
Ed Pinkham	May 8, 1871	September 18, 1871	Third baseman	Chicago White Stockings	
George Pinkney	August 16, 1884	September 29, 1893	Third baseman	Cleveland Blues (NL), Brooklyn Grays/Bridegrooms/Grooms, St. Louis Browns (NL), Louisville Colonels	
Ed Pinnance	September 14, 1903	September 29, 1903	Pitcher	Philadelphia Athletics	
Vada Pinson	April 15, 1958	September 28, 1975	Outfielder	Cincinnati Reds, St. Louis Cardinals, Cleveland Indians, California Angels, Kansas City Royals	
Lerton Pinto	May 23, 1922	September 5, 1924	Pitcher	Philadelphia Phillies	
Renyel Pinto	May 18, 2006		Pitcher	Florida Marlins	
Ed Pipgras	August 25, 1932	September 25, 1932	Pitcher	Brooklyn Dodgers	
George Pipgras	June 9, 1923	June 2, 1935	Pitcher	New York Yankees, Boston Red Sox	
Wally Pipp	June 29, 1913	September 30, 1928	First baseman	Detroit Tigers, New York Yankees, Cincinnati Reds	
Cotton Pippen	August 28, 1936	May 21, 1940	Pitcher	St. Louis Cardinals, Philadelphia Athletics, Detroit Tigers	
James Pirie	September 25, 1883	September 29, 1883	Shortstop	Philadelphia Quakers	
Greg Pirkl	August 13, 1993	August 16, 1996	First baseman	Seattle Mariners, Boston Red Sox	
Gerry Pirtle	July 2, 1978	September 7, 1978	Pitcher	Montreal Expos	
Marc Pisciotta	June 30, 1997	July 7, 1999	Pitcher	Chicago Cubs, Kansas City Royals	
Jim Pisoni	September 25, 1953	October 2, 1960	Outfielder	St. Louis Browns, Kansas City Athletics, Milwaukee Braves, New York Yankees	
Alex Pitko	September 11, 1938	September 21, 1939	Outfielder	Philadelphia Phillies, Washington Senators	
Jake Pitler	May 30, 1917	May 24, 1918	Second baseman	Pittsburgh Pirates	
Skip Pitlock	June 12, 1970	April 10, 1975	Pitcher	San Francisco Giants, Chicago White Sox	
Chris Pittaro	April 8, 1985	October 4, 1987	Utility infielder	Detroit Tigers, Minnesota Twins	
Pinky Pittenger	April 15, 1921	September 22, 1929	Utility infielder	Boston Red Sox, Chicago Cubs, Cincinnati Reds	
Togie Pittinger	April 26, 1900	July 17, 1907	Pitcher	Boston Beaneaters, Philadelphia Phillies	
Joe Pittman	April 25, 1981	May 30, 1984	Second baseman	Houston Astros, San Diego Padres, San Francisco Giants	
Gaylen Pitts	May 12, 1974	September 25, 1975	Third baseman	Oakland Athletics	
Jim Pittsley	May 23, 1995	July 18, 1999	Pitcher	Kansas City Royals, Milwaukee Brewers	
Stan Pitula	April 24, 1957	September 14, 1957	Pitcher	Cleveland Indians	
Herman Pitz	April 18, 1890	October 12, 1890	Catcher	Brooklyn Gladiators, Syracuse Stars (AA)	
Juan Pizarro	May 4, 1957	September 26, 1974	Pitcher	Milwaukee Braves, Chicago White Sox, Pittsburgh Pirates, Boston Red Sox, Cleveland Indians, Oakland Athletics, Chicago Cubs, Houston Astros	
Gordie Pladson	September 7, 1979	April 20, 1982	Pitcher	Houston Astros	
Emil Planeta	September 20, 1931	September 27, 1931	Pitcher	New York Giants	
Ed Plank	September 6, 1978	September 22, 1979	Pitcher	San Francisco Giants	
Eddie Plank β	May 13, 1901	August 6, 1917	Pitcher	Philadelphia Athletics, St. Louis Terriers, St. Louis Browns	
Erik Plantenberg	July 31, 1993	June 20, 1997	Pitcher	Seattle Mariners, Philadelphia Phillies	
Phil Plantier	August 21, 1990	September 28, 1997	Outfielder	Boston Red Sox, San Diego Padres, Houston Astros, Oakland Athletics, St. Louis Cardinals	
Don Plarski	July 20, 1955	August 2, 1955	Outfielder	Kansas City Athletics	
Elmo Plaskett	September 8, 1962	May 18, 1963	Catcher	Pittsburgh Pirates	
Whitey Platt	September 16, 1942	October 2, 1949	Outfielder	Chicago Cubs, Chicago White Sox, St. Louis Browns	
Al Platte	September 1, 1913	September 18, 1913	Outfielder	Detroit Tigers	
Bill Pleis	April 16, 1961	September 15, 1966	Pitcher	Minnesota Twins	
Dan Plesac	April 11, 1986	September 28, 2003	Pitcher	Milwaukee Brewers, Chicago Cubs, Pittsburgh Pirates, Toronto Blue Jays, Arizona Diamondbacks, Philadelphia Phillies	
Rance Pless	April 21, 1956	September 30, 1956	First baseman	Kansas City Athletics	
Herb Plews	April 18, 1956	July 26, 1959	Second baseman	Washington Senators, Boston Red Sox	
Norman Plitt	April 26, 1918	September 26, 1927	Pitcher	Brooklyn Robins, New York Giants	
Walter Plock	August 21, 1891	August 22, 1891	Outfielder	Philadelphia Phillies	
Tim Plodinec	June 2, 1972	June 2, 1972	Pitcher	St. Louis Cardinals	
Trevor Plouffe	May 21, 2010		Shortstop	Minnesota Twins	
Bill Plummer	April 19, 1968	September 7, 1978	Catcher	Chicago Cubs, Cincinnati Reds, Seattle Mariners	
Eric Plunk	May 12, 1986	October 2, 1999	Pitcher	Oakland Athletics, New York Yankees, Cleveland Indians, Milwaukee Brewers	
Jeff Plympton	June 15, 1991	September 16, 1991	Pitcher	Boston Red Sox	
Ray Poat	April 15, 1942	September 21, 1949	Pitcher	Cleveland Indians, San Francisco Giants, Pittsburgh Pirates	
Biff Pocoroba	April 25, 1975	April 20, 1984	Catcher	Atlanta Braves	
Bud Podbielan	April 25, 1949	June 13, 1959	Pitcher	Brooklyn Dodgers, Cincinnati Reds/Redlegs, Cleveland Indians	
Johnny Podgajny	September 15, 1940	May 13, 1946	Pitcher	Philadelphia Phillies, Pittsburgh Pirates, Cleveland Indians	
Johnny Podres	April 17, 1953	June 21, 1969	Pitcher	Brooklyn/Los Angeles Dodgers, Detroit Tigers, San Diego Padres	
Scott Podsednik	July 6, 2001		Outfielder	Seattle Mariners, Milwaukee Brewers, Chicago white Sox, Colorado Rockies, Kansas City Royals, Los Angeles Dodgers	
Mike Poepping	September 6, 1975	September 28, 1975	Outfielder	Minnesota Twins	
Joe Poetz	September 14, 1926	September 22, 1926	Pitcher	New York Giants	
Jimmy Pofahl	April 16, 1940	September 20, 1942	Shortstop	Washington Senators	
John Poff	September 8, 1979	October 5, 1980	Outfielder	Philadelphia Phillies, Milwaukee Brewers	
Boots Poffenberger	June 11, 1937	May 21, 1939	Pitcher	Detroit Tigers, Brooklyn Dodgers	
Tom Poholsky	April 20, 1950	September 11, 1957	Pitcher	St. Louis Cardinals, Chicago Cubs	
Jennings Poindexter	September 15, 1936	June 7, 1939	Pitcher	Boston Red Sox, Philadelphia Phillies	
Aaron Pointer	September 22, 1963	October 1, 1967	Outfielder	Houston Colt .45s/Astros	
Plácido Polanco	July 3, 1998		Second baseman	St. Louis Cardinals, Philadelphia Phillies, Detroit Tigers	
Hugh Poland	April 22, 1943	May 18, 1948	Catcher	New York Giants, Boston Braves, Philadelphia Phillies, Cincinnati Reds	
Lou Polchow	September 14, 1902	September 14, 1902	Pitcher	Cleveland Bronchos	
Kevin Polcovich	May 17, 1997	September 22, 1998	Shortstop	Pittsburgh Pirates	
Dick Pole	August 3, 1973	July 18, 1978	Pitcher	Boston Red Sox, Seattle Mariners	
Mark Polhemus	July 13, 1887	August 11, 1887	Outfielder	Indianapolis Hoosiers (NL)	
Gus Polidor	September 7, 1985	July 22, 1993	Utility infielder	California Angels, Milwaukee Brewers, Florida Marlins	
Cliff Politte	April 2, 1998	July 15, 2006	Pitcher	St. Louis Cardinals, Philadelphia Phillies, Toronto Blue Jays, Chicago White Sox	
Ken Polivka	April 18, 1947	April 23, 1947	Pitcher	Cincinnati Reds	
Howie Pollet	August 20, 1941	September 23, 1956	Pitcher	St. Louis Cardinals, Pittsburgh Pirates, Chicago Cubs, Chicago White Sox	
Dale Polley	June 23, 1996	September 29, 1996	Pitcher	New York Yankees	
Lou Polli	April 18, 1932	July 7, 1944	Pitcher	St. Louis Browns, New York Giants	
Nick Polly	September 11, 1937	May 20, 1945	Third baseman	Brooklyn Dodgers, Boston Red Sox	
John Poloni	September 16, 1977	October 2, 1977	Pitcher	Texas Rangers	
Luis Polonia	April 24, 1987	October 1, 2000	Outfielder	Oakland Athletics, California Angels, New York Yankees, Atlanta Braves, Baltimore Orioles, Detroit Tigers	
Drew Pomeranz	September 11, 2011		Pitcher	Colorado Rockies	
John Pomorski	April 17, 1934	May 5, 1934	Pitcher	Chicago White Sox	
Carlos Ponce	April 14, 1985	October 6, 1985	First baseman	Milwaukee Brewers	
Arlie Pond	July 4, 1895	July 6, 1898	Pitcher	Baltimore Orioles (19th century)	
Ralph Pond	June 8, 1910	June 8, 1910	Outfielder	Boston Red Sox	
Simon Pond	April 7, 2004	June 5, 2004	Outfielder	Toronto Blue Jays	
Elmer Ponder	September 18, 1917	September 21, 1921	Pitcher	Pittsburgh Pirates, Chicago Cubs	
Sidney Ponson	April 19, 1998		Pitcher	Baltimore Orioles, San Francisco Giants, St. Louis Cardinals, New York Yankees, Minnesota Twins, Texas Rangers, Kansas City Royals	
Harlin Pool	May 30, 1934	June 2, 1935	Outfielder	Cincinnati Reds	
Ed Poole	October 6, 1900	July 27, 1904	Pitcher	Pittsburgh Pirates, Cincinnati Reds, Brooklyn Superbas	
Jim Poole (1B)	April 14, 1925	August 22, 1927	First baseman	Philadelphia Athletics	
Jim Poole (P)	June 15, 1990	June 1, 2000	Pitcher	Los Angeles Dodgers, Texas Rangers, Baltimore Orioles, Cleveland Indians, San Francisco Giants, Philadelphia Phillies, Detroit Tigers, Montreal Expos	
Ray Poole	September 9, 1941	June 13, 1947	Pinch hitter	Philadelphia Athletics	
Tom Poorman	May 5, 1880	September 18, 1888	Outfielder	Buffalo Bisons (NL), Chicago White Stockings, Toledo Blue Stockings, Boston Beaneaters, Philadelphia Athletics (AA)	
Dave Pope	July 1, 1952	September 30, 1956	Outfielder	Cleveland Indians, Baltimore Orioles	
Paul Popovich	April 19, 1964	July 21, 1975	Second baseman	Chicago Cubs, Los Angeles Dodgers, Pittsburgh Pirates	
Bill Popp	April 19, 1902	July 21, 1902	Pitcher	St. Louis Cardinals	
George Popplein	July 11, 1873	July 11, 1873	Utility player	Baltimore Marylands	
Tom Poquette	September 1, 1973	July 9, 1982	Outfielder	Kansas City Royals, Boston Red Sox, Texas Rangers	
Rick Porcello	April 9, 2009		Pitcher	Detroit Tigers	
Aaron Poreda	June 12, 2009		Pitcher	Chicago White Sox, San Diego Padres	
Ed Porray	April 17, 1914	May 1, 1914	Pitcher	Buffalo Buffeds	
Bo Porter	May 9, 1999	August 7, 2001	Outfielder	Chicago Cubs, Oakland Athletics, Texas Rangers	
Bob Porter	May 13, 1981	September 30, 1982	Outfielder	Atlanta Braves	
Chuck Porter	September 14, 1981	October 6, 1985	Pitcher	Milwaukee Brewers	
Colin Porter	May 30, 2003	May 23, 2004	Outfielder	Houston Astros, St. Louis Cardinals	
Dan Porter	August 16, 1951	September 30, 1951	Outfielder	Washington Senators	
Darrell Porter	September 2, 1971	October 4, 1987	Catcher	Milwaukee Brewers, Kansas City Royals, St. Louis Cardinals, Texas Rangers	
Dick Porter	April 16, 1929	September 30, 1934	Outfielder	Cleveland Indians, Boston Red Sox	
Henry Porter	September 27, 1884	May 25, 1889	Pitcher	Milwaukee Brewers (UA), Brooklyn Grays, Kansas City Cowboys (AA)	
Irv Porter	August 20, 1914	August 20, 1914	Outfielder	Chicago White Sox	
Jay Porter	July 30, 1952	September 27, 1959	Utility player	St. Louis Browns, Detroit Tigers, Cleveland Indians, Washington Senators, St. Louis Cardinals	
Matthew Porter	June 27, 1884	July 5, 1884	Outfielder	Kansas City Cowboys (UA)	
Ned Porter	August 7, 1926	May 2, 1927	Pitcher	New York Giants	
Odie Porter	June 16, 1902	June 16, 1902	Pitcher	Philadelphia Athletics	
Bob Porterfield	August 8, 1948	September 21, 1959	Pitcher	New York Yankees, Washington Senators, Boston Red Sox, Pittsburgh Pirates, Chicago Cubs	
Al Porto	April 22, 1948	May 2, 1948	Pitcher	Philadelphia Phillies	
Arnie Portocarrero	April 18, 1954	June 15, 1960	Pitcher	Philadelphia/Kansas City Athletics, Baltimore Orioles	
Mark Portugal	August 14, 1985	September 22, 1999	Pitcher	Minnesota Twins, Houston Astros, San Francisco Giants, Cincinnati Reds, Philadelphia Phillies, Boston Red Sox	
Mike Porzio	July 9, 1999	July 26, 2003	Pitcher	Colorado Rockies, Chicago White Sox	
Jorge Posada	September 4, 1995		Catcher	New York Yankees	
Leo Posada	September 21, 1960	July 20, 1962	Outfielder	Kansas City Athletics	
Scott Pose	April 5, 1993	September 29, 2000	Outfielder	Florida Marlins, New York Yankees, Kansas City Royals	
Bill Posedel	April 23, 1938	September 13, 1946	Pitcher	Brooklyn Dodgers, Boston Bees/Braves	
Bob Poser	April 17, 1932	August 27, 1935	Pitcher	Chicago White Sox, St. Louis Browns	
Buster Posey	September 11, 2009		Catcher	San Francisco Giants	
Lou Possehl	August 25, 1946	June 4, 1952	Pitcher	Philadelphia Phillies	
Lew Post	September 21, 1902	September 22, 1902	Outfielder	Detroit Tigers	
Sam Post	April 22, 1922	May 11, 1922	First baseman	Brooklyn Robins	
Wally Post	September 18, 1949	May 9, 1964	Outfielder	Cincinnati Reds/Redlegs, Philadelphia Phillies, Minnesota Twins, Cleveland Indians	
Lou Pote	August 11, 1999	June 9, 2004	Pitcher	Anaheim Angels, Cleveland Indians	
Nellie Pott	April 19, 1922	May 1, 1922	Pitcher	Cleveland Indians	
Dykes Potter	April 26, 1938	May 2, 1938	Pitcher	Brooklyn Dodgers	
Mike Potter	September 6, 1976	October 2, 1977	Outfielder	St. Louis Cardinals	
Nels Potter	April 25, 1936	September 18, 1949	Pitcher	St. Louis Cardinals, Philadelphia Athletics, Boston Red Sox, St. Louis Browns, Boston Braves	
Squire Potter	August 7, 1923	August 7, 1923	Pitcher	Washington Senators	
Doc Potts	October 3, 1892	October 3, 1892	Catcher	Washington Senators (1891–99)	
John Potts	April 18, 1914	September 2, 1914	Outfielder	Kansas City Packers	
Mike Potts	April 6, 1996	July 15, 1996	Pitcher	Milwaukee Brewers	
Ken Poulsen	July 3, 1967	July 14, 1967	Third baseman	Boston Red Sox	
Bill Pounds	May 2, 1903	June 30, 1903	Pitcher	Cleveland Naps, Brooklyn Superbas	
Abner Powell	August 4, 1884	October 13, 1886	Pitcher	Washington Nationals (UA), Baltimore Orioles (19th century), Cincinnati Red Stockings (AA)	
Alonzo Powell	April 6, 1987	October 6, 1991	Outfielder	Montreal Expos, Seattle Mariners	
Bill Powell	April 16, 1909	April 28, 1913	Pitcher	Pittsburgh Pirates, Chicago Cubs, Cincinnati Reds	
Bob Powell	September 16, 1955	April 20, 1957	Pinch runner	Chicago White Sox	
Boog Powell	September 26, 1961	August 24, 1977	First baseman	Baltimore Orioles, Cleveland Indians, Los Angeles Dodgers	
Brian Powell	June 27, 1998	September 24, 2004	Pitcher	Detroit Tigers, Houston Astros, San Francisco Giants, Philadelphia Phillies	
Dante Powell	April 15, 1997	October 7, 2001	Outfielder	San Francisco Giants, Arizona Diamondbacks	
Dennis Powell	July 7, 1985	August 11, 1993	Pitcher	Los Angeles Dodgers, Seattle Mariners, Milwaukee Brewers	
Grover Powell	July 13, 1963	September 29, 1963	Pitcher	New York Mets	
Hosken Powell	April 5, 1978	July 1, 1983	Outfielder	Minnesota Twins, Toronto Blue Jays	
Jack Powell (1897–1912 P)	June 23, 1897	September 24, 1912	Pitcher	Cleveland Spiders, St. Louis Perfectos/Cardinals, St. Louis Browns, New York Highlanders	
Jack Powell (1913 P)	June 14, 1913	July 9, 1913	Pitcher	St. Louis Browns	
Jake Powell	August 3, 1930	September 30, 1945	Outfielder	Washington Senators, New York Yankees, Philadelphia Phillies	
Jay Powell	September 10, 1995	July 29, 2005	Pitcher	Florida Marlins, Houston Astros, Colorado Rockies, Texas Rangers, Atlanta Braves	
Jeremy Powell	July 23, 1998	October 1, 2000	Pitcher	Montreal Expos	
Jim Powell	August 4, 1884	October 5, 1885	First baseman	Richmond Virginians, Philadelphia Athletics (AA)	
Landon Powell	April 11, 2009		Catcher	Oakland Athletics	
Martin Powell	June 18, 1881	August 10, 1884	First baseman	Detroit Wolverines, Cincinnati Outlaw Reds	
Paul Powell	April 7, 1971	September 3, 1975	Outfielder	Minnesota Twins, Los Angeles Dodgers	
Ray Powell	April 16, 1913	September 28, 1924	Outfielder	Detroit Tigers, Boston Braves	
Ross Powell	September 5, 1993	September 30, 1995	Pitcher	Cincinnati Reds, Houston Astros, Pittsburgh Pirates	
Ted Power	September 9, 1981	September 30, 1993	Pitcher	Los Angeles Dodgers, Cincinnati Reds, Kansas City Royals, Detroit Tigers, St. Louis Cardinals, Pittsburgh Pirates, Cleveland Indians, Seattle Mariners	
Tom Power	August 27, 1890	October 15, 1890	First baseman	Baltimore Orioles (19th century)	
Vic Power	April 13, 1954	October 3, 1965	First baseman	Philadelphia/Kansas City Athletics, Cleveland Indians, Minnesota Twins, Los Angeles Angels, Philadelphia Phillies, California Angels	
Doc Powers	June 12, 1898	April 12, 1909	Catcher	Louisville Colonels, Washington Senators (1891–99), Philadelphia Athletics, New York Highlanders	
Ike Powers	July 26, 1927	September 3, 1928	Pitcher	Philadelphia Athletics	
Jim Powers	April 18, 1890	May 11, 1890	Pitcher	Brooklyn Gladiators	
John Powers	September 24, 1955	May 31, 1960	Outfielder	Pittsburgh Pirates, Cincinnati Reds, Baltimore Orioles, Cleveland Indians	
Les Powers	September 17, 1938	June 3, 1939	First baseman	New York Giants, Philadelphia Phillies	
Mike Powers	August 19, 1932	June 24, 1933	Outfielder	Cleveland Indians	
Phil Powers	August 31, 1878	August 26, 1885	Catcher	Chicago White Stockings, Boston Beaneaters, Cleveland Blues (NL), Cincinnati Red Stockings (AA), Baltimore Orioles (19th century)	
Carl Powis	April 15, 1957	May 5, 1957	Outfielder	Baltimore Orioles	
Arquimedez Pozo	September 12, 1995	September 28, 1997	Utility infielder	Seattle Mariners, Boston Red Sox	
Martín Prado	April 23, 2006		Utility infielder	Atlanta Braves	
Willie Prall	September 3, 1975	September 13, 1975	Pitcher	Chicago Cubs	
Johnny Pramesa	April 24, 1949	July 26, 1952	Catcher	Cincinnati Reds, Chicago Cubs	
Al Pratt	May 4, 1871	August 19, 1872	Pitcher	Cleveland Forest Citys	
Andy Pratt	September 28, 2002	April 12, 2004	Pitcher	Atlanta Braves, Chicago Cubs	
Del Pratt	April 11, 1912	September 29, 1924	Second baseman	St. Louis Browns, New York Yankees, Boston Red Sox, Detroit Tigers	
Frank Pratt	May 13, 1921	May 13, 1921	Pinch hitter	Chicago White Sox	
Larry Pratt	September 19, 1914	August 17, 1915	Catcher	Boston Red Sox, Newark Peppers, Brooklyn Tip-Tops	
Todd Pratt	July 29, 1992	September 27, 2006	Catcher	Philadelphia Phillies, Chicago Cubs, New York Mets, Atlanta Braves	
Tom Pratt	October 18, 1871	October 18, 1871	First baseman	Philadelphia Athletics (1860–76)	
John Pregenzer	April 20, 1963	September 7, 1964	Pitcher	San Francisco Giants	
Mel Preibisch	September 17, 1940	May 5, 1941	Outfielder	Boston Bees/Braves	
Jim Prendergast	April 25, 1948	June 29, 1948	Pitcher	Boston Braves	
Mike Prendergast	April 26, 1914	June 9, 1919	Pitcher	Chicago Chi-Feds/Whales, Chicago Cubs, Philadelphia Phillies	
George Prentiss	September 23, 1901	July 29, 1902	Pitcher	Boston Americans, Baltimore Orioles	
Bobby Prescott	June 17, 1961	July 1, 1961	Outfielder	Kansas City Athletics	
Joe Presko	May 3, 1951	May 7, 1958	Pitcher	St. Louis Cardinals, Detroit Tigers	
Alex Presley	September 8, 2010		Outfielder	Pittsburgh Pirates	
Jim Presley	June 24, 1984	June 7, 1991	Third baseman	Seattle Mariners, Atlanta Braves, San Diego Padres	
Tot Pressnell	April 21, 1938	August 30, 1942	Pitcher	Brooklyn Dodgers, Chicago Cubs	
Walt Preston	April 18, 1895	July 8, 1895	Utility player	Louisville Colonels	
Bill Price	April 27, 1890	April 27, 1890	Pitcher	Philadelphia Athletics (AA)	
David Price	September 14, 2008		Pitcher	Tampa Bay Rays	
Jackie Price	August 18, 1946	September 20, 1946	Shortstop	Cleveland Indians	
Jim Price	April 11, 1967	September 13, 1971	Catcher	Detroit Tigers	
Joe Price (OF)	September 5, 1928	September 5, 1928	Outfielder	New York Giants	
Joe Price (P)	June 14, 1980	September 16, 1990	Pitcher	Cincinnati Reds, San Francisco Giants, Boston Red Sox, Baltimore Orioles	
Bob Prichard	June 14, 1939	August 24, 1939	First baseman	Washington Senators	
Bob Priddy	September 20, 1962	September 12, 1971	Pitcher	Pittsburgh Pirates, San Francisco Giants, Washington Senators (1961–1971), Chicago White Sox, California Angels, Atlanta Braves	
Jerry Priddy	April 17, 1941	September 27, 1953	Second baseman	New York Yankees, Washington Senators, St. Louis Browns, Detroit Tigers	
Curtis Pride	September 14, 1993	October 1, 2006	Outfielder	Montreal Expos, Detroit Tigers, Boston Red Sox, Atlanta Braves, New York Yankees, Anaheim/Los Angeles Angels	
Jason Pridie	September 3, 2008		Outfielder	Minnesota Twins, New York Mets	
Eddie Priest	May 27, 1998	June 1, 1998	Pitcher	Cincinnati Reds	
Johnny Priest	May 30, 1911	September 7, 1912	Second baseman	New York Highlanders	
Alex Prieto	July 26, 2003	June 24, 2004	Second baseman	Minnesota Twins	
Ariel Prieto	July 2, 1995	May 10, 2001	Pitcher	Oakland Athletics, Tampa Bay Devil Rays	
Chris Prieto	May 14, 2005	May 16, 2005	Outfielder	Los Angeles Angels of Anaheim	
Ray Prim	September 24, 1933	September 28, 1946	Pitcher	Washington Senators, Philadelphia Phillies, Chicago Cubs	
Don Prince	September 21, 1962	September 21, 1962	Pitcher	Chicago Cubs	
Tom Prince	September 22, 1987	September 28, 2003	Catcher	Pittsburgh Pirates, Los Angeles Dodgers, Philadelphia Phillies, Minnesota Twins, Kansas City Royals	
Walter Prince	August 7, 1883	August 4, 1884	First baseman	Louisville Eclipse, Detroit Wolverines, Washington Nationals (AA), Washington Nationals (UA)	
Bret Prinz	April 22, 2001	June 12, 2007	Pitcher	Arizona Diamondbacks, New York Yankees, Los Angeles Angels of Anaheim, Chicago White Sox	
Mark Prior	May 22, 2002	August 10, 2006	Pitcher	Chicago Cubs	
Buddy Pritchard	April 21, 1957	September 1, 1957	Shortstop	Pittsburgh Pirates	
Chris Pritchett	September 6, 1996	May 23, 2000	First baseman	California/Anaheim Angels, Philadelphia Phillies	
Jim Proctor	September 14, 1959	September 26, 1959	Pitcher	Detroit Tigers	
Red Proctor	August 6, 1923	August 9, 1923	Pitcher	Chicago White Sox	
Scott Proctor	April 20, 2004		Pitcher	New York Yankees, Los Angeles Dodgers, Atlanta Braves	
George Proeser	September 15, 1888	July 10, 1890	Utility player	Cleveland Blues, Syracuse Stars (AA)	
Luke Prokopec	September 4, 2000	August 23, 2002	Pitcher	Los Angeles Dodgers, Toronto Blue Jays	
Mike Proly	April 10, 1976	October 2, 1983	Pitcher	St. Louis Cardinals, Chicago White Sox, Philadelphia Phillies, Chicago Cubs	
Jake Propst	August 7, 1923	August 7, 1923	Pinch hitter	Washington Senators	
Doc Prothro	September 26, 1920	September 24, 1926	Third baseman	Washington Senators, Boston Red Sox, Cincinnati Reds	
Bill Prough	April 27, 1912	April 27, 1912	Pitcher	Cincinnati Reds	
Augie Prudhomme	April 19, 1929	October 6, 1929	Pitcher	Detroit Tigers	
Earl Pruess	September 15, 1920	September 15, 1920	Outfielder	St. Louis Browns	
Hub Pruett	April 26, 1922	September 20, 1932	Pitcher	St. Louis Browns, Philadelphia Phillies, New York Giants, Boston Braves	
Jim Pruett	September 26, 1944	May 30, 1945	Catcher	Philadelphia Athletics	
Tex Pruiett	April 26, 1907	July 18, 1908	Pitcher	Boston Red Sox	
Ron Pruitt	June 25, 1975	April 9, 1983	Outfielder	Texas Rangers, Cleveland Indians, Chicago White Sox, San Francisco Giants	
Greg Pryor	June 4, 1976	September 30, 1986	Utility infielder	Texas Rangers, Chicago White Sox, Kansas City Royals	
George Puccinelli	July 17, 1930	September 27, 1936	Outfielder	St. Louis Cardinals, St. Louis Browns, Philadelphia Athletics	
Kirby Puckett β	May 8, 1984	September 28, 1995	Outfielder	Minnesota Twins	
Troy Puckett	October 4, 1911	October 4, 1911	Pitcher	Philadelphia Phillies	
Miguel Puente	May 3, 1970	May 26, 1970	Pitcher	San Francisco Giants	
Brandon Puffer	April 17, 2002	June 26, 2005	Pitcher	Houston Astros, San Diego Padres, San Francisco Giants	
Tim Pugh	September 1, 1992	May 24, 1997	Pitcher	Cincinnati Reds, Kansas City Royals, Detroit Tigers	
John Puhl	October 31, 1898	May 31, 1899	Third baseman	New York Giants	
Terry Puhl	July 12, 1977	May 29, 1991	Outfielder	Houston Astros, Kansas City Royals	
Rich Puig	September 13, 1974	September 25, 1974	Second baseman	New York Mets	
Albert Pujols	April 2, 2001		First baseman	St. Louis Cardinals	
Luis Pujols	September 22, 1977	May 22, 1985	Catcher	Houston Astros, Kansas City Royals, Texas Rangers	
Charlie Puleo	September 16, 1981	September 25, 1989	Pitcher	New York Mets, Cincinnati Reds, Atlanta Braves	
Alfonso Pulido	September 5, 1983	September 1, 1986	Pitcher	Pittsburgh Pirates, New York Yankees	
Carlos Pulido	April 9, 1994	April 24, 2004	Pitcher	Minnesota Twins	
Harvey Pulliam	August 10, 1991	September 28, 1997	Outfielder	Kansas City Royals, Colorado Rockies	
Bill Pulsipher	June 17, 1995	May 7, 2005	Pitcher	New York Mets, Milwaukee Brewers, Boston Red Sox, Chicago White Sox, St. Louis Cardinals	
Spencer Pumpelly	July 11, 1925	July 11, 1925	Pitcher	Washington Senators	
Nick Punto	September 9, 2001		Utility infielder	Philadelphia Phillies, Minnesota Twins, St. Louis Cardinals	
Blondie Purcell	May 1, 1879	September 16, 1890	Outfielder	Syracuse Stars (NL), Cincinnati Reds (1876–1880), Cleveland Blues (NL), Buffalo Bisons (NL), Philadelphia Quakers, Philadelphia Athletics (AA), Boston Beaneaters, Baltimore Orioles (19th century)	
David Purcey	April 18, 2008		Pitcher	Toronto Blue Jays, Oakland Athletics, Detroit Tigers	
John Purdin	September 16, 1964	August 1, 1969	Pitcher	Los Angeles Dodgers	
Pid Purdy	September 7, 1926	September 14, 1929	Outfielder	Chicago White Sox, Cincinnati Reds	
Bob Purkey	April 14, 1954	July 26, 1966	Pitcher	Pittsburgh Pirates, Cincinnati Reds, St. Louis Cardinals	
Jesse Purnell	October 1, 1904	October 8, 1904	Third baseman	Philadelphia Phillies	
Oscar Purner	September 2, 1895	September 2, 1895	Pitcher	Washington Senators (1891–99)	
Billy Purtell	April 16, 1908	September 22, 1914	Third baseman	Chicago White Sox, Boston Red Sox, Detroit Tigers	
Ed Putman	September 7, 1976	September 26, 1979	Catcher	Chicago Cubs, Detroit Tigers	
Danny Putnam	April 23, 2007		Outfielder	Oakland Athletics	
Pat Putnam	September 2, 1977	September 20, 1984	First baseman	Texas Rangers, Seattle Mariners, Minnesota Twins	
Zach Putnam	September 13, 2011		Pitcher	Cleveland Indians	
Ambrose Puttmann	September 4, 1903	May 10, 1906	Pitcher	New York Highlanders, St. Louis Cardinals	
J. J. Putz	August 11, 2003		Pitcher	Seattle Mariners, New York Mets, Chicago White Sox, Arizona Diamondbacks	
Jim Pyburn	April 17, 1955	June 16, 1957	Outfielder	Baltimore Orioles	
Eddie Pye	June 3, 1994	May 19, 1995	Utility infielder	Los Angeles Dodgers	
John Pyecha	April 24, 1954	April 24, 1954	Pitcher	Chicago Cubs	
Ewald Pyle	April 23, 1939	June 30, 1945	Pitcher	St. Louis Browns, Washington Senators, New York Giants, Boston Braves	
Harlan Pyle	September 21, 1928	September 22, 1928	Pitcher	Cincinnati Reds	
Shadow Pyle	October 15, 1884	May 13, 1887	Pitcher	Philadelphia Quakers, Chicago White Stockings	
Frankie Pytlak	April 22, 1932	April 25, 1946	Catcher	Cleveland Indians, Boston Red Sox	
Tim Pyznarski	September 14, 1986	October 5, 1986	First baseman	San Diego Padres	
