= List of Major League Baseball players (Pa–Pg) =

The following is a list of Major League Baseball players, retired or active.

== Pa through Pf ==
Name	Debut	Final game	Position	Teams	Ref
Charlie Pabor	May 4, 1871	October 28, 1875	Outfielder	Cleveland Forest Citys, Brooklyn Atlantics, Philadelphia White Stockings, New Haven Elm Citys	
Ed Pabst	September 26, 1890	October 14, 1890	Outfielder	Philadelphia Athletics (AA), St. Louis Browns	
John Pacella	September 15, 1977	July 12, 1986	Pitcher	New York Mets, Minnesota Twins, Baltimore Orioles, Detroit Tigers	
Alex Pacheco	April 17, 1996	May 15, 1996	Pitcher	Montreal Expos	
Jordan Pacheco	September 6, 2011		Utility player	Colorado Rockies	
Pat Pacillo	May 23, 1987	June 1, 1988	Pitcher	Cincinnati Reds	
Jim Paciorek	April 9, 1987	September 23, 1987	Utility player	Milwaukee Brewers	
John Paciorek	September 29, 1963	September 29, 1963	Outfielder	Houston Colt .45s	
Tom Paciorek	September 12, 1970	October 4, 1987	Outfielder	Los Angeles Dodgers, Atlanta Braves, Seattle Mariners, Chicago White Sox, New York Mets, Texas Rangers	
Frankie Pack	June 5, 1949	June 5, 1949	Pinch hitter	St. Louis Browns	
Gene Packard	September 27, 1912	August 14, 1919	Pitcher	Cincinnati Reds, Kansas City Royals, Chicago Cubs, St. Louis Cardinals, Philadelphia Phillies	
Joe Pactwa	September 15, 1975	September 28, 1975	Pitcher	California Angels	
Dick Padden	July 15, 1896	May 2, 1905	Second baseman	Pittsburgh Pirates, Washington Senators (1891–99), St. Louis Cardinals, St. Louis Browns	
Tom Padden	May 29, 1932	July 22, 1943	Catcher	Pittsburgh Pirates, Philadelphia Phillies, Washington Senators	
Del Paddock	April 14, 1912	October 1, 1912	Third baseman	Chicago White Sox, New York Highlanders	
Don Padgett	April 23, 1937	September 12, 1948	Utility player	St. Louis Cardinals, Brooklyn Dodgers, Boston Braves, Philadelphia Phillies	
Ernie Padgett	October 3, 1923	July 30, 1927	Third baseman	Boston Braves, Cleveland Indians	
Jorge Padilla	August 5, 2009		Outfielder	Washington Nationals	
Juan Padilla	July 16, 2004	October 1, 2005	Pitcher	New York Yankees, Cincinnati Reds, New York Mets	
Vicente Padilla	June 29, 1999		Pitcher	Arizona Diamondbacks, Philadelphia Phillies, Texas Rangers, Los Angeles Dodgers	
Dennis Paepke	June 2, 1969	October 2, 1974	Catcher	Kansas City Royals	
Andy Pafko	September 24, 1943	September 29, 1959	Outfielder	Chicago Cubs, Brooklyn Dodgers, Milwaukee Braves	
Ángel Pagán	April 3, 2006		Outfielder	Chicago Cubs, New York Mets	
Dave Pagan	July 1, 1973	September 27, 1977	Pitcher	New York Yankees, Baltimore Orioles, Seattle Mariners, Pittsburgh Pirates	
José Pagán	August 4, 1959	August 15, 1973	Shortstop	San Francisco Giants, Pittsburgh Pirates	
Joe Page	April 19, 1944	May 25, 1954	Pitcher	New York Yankees, Pittsburgh Pirates	
Mike Page	June 30, 1968	August 24, 1968	Outfielder	Atlanta Braves	
Mitchell Page	April 9, 1977	September 30, 1984	Outfielder	Oakland Athletics, Pittsburgh Pirates	
Phil Page	September 18, 1928	May 13, 1934	Pitcher	Detroit Tigers, Brooklyn Dodgers	
Sam Page	September 11, 1939	September 28, 1939	Pitcher	Philadelphia Athletics	
Vance Page	August 6, 1938	August 6, 1941	Pitcher	Chicago Cubs	
Karl Pagel	September 21, 1978	September 30, 1983	First baseman	Chicago Cubs, Cleveland Indians	
Jim Pagliaroni	August 13, 1955	September 30, 1969	Catcher	Boston Red Sox, Pittsburgh Pirates, Oakland Athletics, Seattle Pilots	
Mike Pagliarulo	July 7, 1984	October 1, 1995	Third baseman	New York Yankees, San Diego Padres, Minnesota Twins, Baltimore Orioles, Texas Rangers	
Matt Pagnozzi	September 29, 2009		Catcher	St. Louis Cardinals, Colorado Rockies, Pittsburgh Pirates	
Tom Pagnozzi	April 12, 1987	August 15, 1998	Catcher	St. Louis Cardinals	
Pat Paige	May 20, 1911	June 1, 1911	Pitcher	Cleveland Naps	
Satchel Paige β	July 9, 1948	September 25, 1965	Pitcher	Cleveland Indians, St. Louis Browns, Kansas City Athletics	
Phil Paine	July 14, 1951	September 19, 1958	Pitcher	Boston/Milwaukee Braves, St. Louis Cardinals	
Lance Painter	May 19, 1993	September 9, 2003	Pitcher	Colorado Rockies, St. Louis Cardinals, Toronto Blue Jays, Milwaukee Brewers	
Rey Palacios	September 8, 1988	September 14, 1990	Catcher	Kansas City Royals	
Vicente Palacios	September 4, 1987	May 11, 2000	Pitcher	Pittsburgh Pirates, St. Louis Cardinals, San Diego Padres	
Mike Palagyi	August 18, 1939	August 18, 1939	Pitcher	Washington Senators	
Erv Palica	April 21, 1945	September 24, 1956	Pitcher	Brooklyn Dodgers, Baltimore Orioles	
Donn Pall	August 1, 1988	September 27, 1998	Pitcher	Chicago White Sox, Philadelphia Phillies, New York Yankees, Chicago Cubs, Florida Marlins	
Mike Palm	July 11, 1948	July 21, 1948	Pitcher	Boston Red Sox	
Orlando Palmeiro	July 1, 1995	September 30, 2007	Outfielder	California/Anaheim Angels, St. Louis Cardinals, Houston Astros	
Rafael Palmeiro	September 8, 1986	August 30, 2005	First baseman	Chicago Cubs, Texas Rangers, Baltimore Orioles	
Billy Palmer	May 28, 1885	June 3, 1885	Pitcher	St. Louis Maroons	
David Palmer	September 9, 1978	June 30, 1989	Pitcher	Montreal Expos, Atlanta Braves, Philadelphia Phillies, Detroit Tigers	
Dean Palmer	September 1, 1989	May 9, 2003	Third baseman	Texas Rangers, Kansas City Royals, Detroit Tigers	
Eddie Palmer	September 6, 1917	October 3, 1917	Third baseman	Philadelphia Athletics	
Jim Palmer β	April 17, 1965	May 12, 1984	Pitcher	Baltimore Orioles	
Lowell Palmer	June 21, 1969	September 16, 1974	Pitcher	Philadelphia Phillies, St. Louis Cardinals, Cleveland Indians, San Diego Padres	
Matt Palmer	August 16, 2008		Pitcher	San Francisco Giants, Los Angeles Angels of Anaheim	
Emilio Palmero	September 21, 1915	August 24, 1928	Pitcher	New York Giants, St. Louis Browns, Washington Senators, Boston Braves	
Joe Palmisano	May 31, 1931	September 25, 1931	Catcher	Philadelphia Athletics	
Ed Palmquist	June 10, 1960	June 11, 1961	Pitcher	Los Angeles Dodgers, Minnesota Twins	
Stan Palys	September 20, 1953	September 25, 1956	Outfielder	Philadelphia Phillies, Cincinnati Reds	
José Paniagua	April 4, 1996	September 9, 2003	Pitcher	Montreal Expos, Seattle Mariners, Detroit Tigers, Chicago White Sox	
Jim Pankovits	May 27, 1984	September 19, 1990	Second baseman	Houston Astros, Boston Red Sox	
Jim Panther	April 5, 1971	August 2, 1973	Pitcher	Oakland Athletics, Texas Rangers, Atlanta Braves	
John Papa	April 11, 1961	September 16, 1962	Pitcher	Baltimore Orioles	
Al Papai	April 24, 1948	September 16, 1955	Pitcher	St. Louis Browns, St. Louis Cardinals, Boston Red Sox, Chicago White Sox	
Ken Pape	May 17, 1976	October 3, 1976	Utility infielder	Texas Rangers	
Larry Pape	July 6, 1909	September 26, 1912	Pitcher	Boston Red Sox	
Jonathan Papelbon	July 31, 2005		Pitcher	Boston Red Sox	
Stan Papi	April 11, 1974	October 1, 1981	Utility infielder	St. Louis Cardinals, Montreal Expos, Boston Red Sox, Detroit Tigers	
Frank Papish	May 8, 1945	June 27, 1950	Pitcher	Chicago White Sox, Cleveland Indians, Pittsburgh Pirates	
John Pappalau	June 9, 1897	June 22, 1897	Pitcher	Cleveland Spiders	
Erik Pappas	April 19, 1991	April 30, 1994	Catcher	Chicago Cubs, St. Louis Cardinals	
Milt Pappas	August 10, 1957	September 18, 1973	Pitcher	Baltimore Orioles, Cincinnati Reds, Atlanta Braves, Chicago Cubs	
Craig Paquette	June 1, 1993	April 24, 2003	Third baseman	Oakland Athletics, Kansas City Royals, New York Mets, St. Louis Cardinals, Detroit Tigers	
Al Pardo	July 3, 1985	September 9, 1989	Catcher	Baltimore Orioles, Philadelphia Phillies	
Jimmy Paredes	August 1, 2011		Third baseman	Houston Astros	
Johnny Paredes	April 29, 1988	October 6, 1991	Second baseman	Montreal Expos, Detroit Tigers	
Freddy Parent	July 14, 1899	April 30, 1911	Shortstop	St. Louis Perfectos, Boston Americans, Chicago White Sox	
Mark Parent	September 20, 1986	September 1, 1998	Catcher	San Diego Padres, Texas Rangers, Baltimore Orioles, Chicago Cubs, Pittsburgh Pirates, Detroit Tigers, Philadelphia Phillies	
Kelly Paris	September 1, 1982	August 18, 1988	Third baseman	St. Louis Cardinals, Cincinnati Reds, Baltimore Orioles, Chicago White Sox	
Mike Parisi	May 5, 2008		Pitcher	St. Louis Cardinals	
Tony Parisse	September 22, 1943	July 1, 1944	Catcher	Philadelphia Athletics	
Chan Ho Park	April 8, 1994		Pitcher	Los Angeles Dodgers, Texas Rangers, San Diego Padres, New York Mets, Philadelphia Phillies, New York Yankees, Pittsburgh Pirates	
Jim Park	September 7, 1915	July 11, 1917	Pitcher	St. Louis Browns	
Ace Parker	April 24, 1937	September 4, 1938	Shortstop	Philadelphia Athletics	
Billy Parker	September 9, 1971	September 29, 1973	Second baseman	California Angels	
Christian Parker	April 6, 2001	April 6, 2001	Pitcher	New York Yankees	
Clay Parker	September 14, 1987	June 8, 1992	Pitcher	Seattle Mariners, New York Yankees, Detroit Tigers	
Dave Parker	July 12, 1973	October 2, 1991	Outfielder	Pittsburgh Pirates, Cincinnati Reds, Oakland Athletics, Milwaukee Brewers, California Angels, Toronto Blue Jays	
Dixie Parker	July 28, 1923	October 6, 1923	Catcher	Philadelphia Phillies	
Doc Parker	July 11, 1893	June 21, 1901	Pitcher	Chicago Colts, Cincinnati Reds	
Harry Parker	August 8, 1970	September 14, 1976	Pitcher	St. Louis Cardinals, New York Mets, Cleveland Indians	
Jarrod Parker	September 27, 2011		Pitcher	Arizona Diamondbacks	
Jay Parker	September 27, 1899	September 27, 1899	Pitcher	Pittsburgh Pirates	
Pat Parker	August 10, 1915	August 11, 1915	Outfielder	St. Louis Browns	
Rick Parker	May 4, 1990	August 30, 1996	Outfielder	San Francisco Giants, Houston Astros, New York Mets, Los Angeles Dodgers	
Roy Parker	September 10, 1919	September 16, 1919	Pitcher	St. Louis Cardinals	
Salty Parker	August 13, 1936	September 16, 1936	Shortstop	Detroit Tigers	
Wes Parker	April 19, 1964	October 1, 1972	First baseman	Los Angeles Dodgers	
Frank Parkinson	April 13, 1921	September 27, 1924	Second baseman	Philadelphia Phillies	
Art Parks	September 25, 1937	September 29, 1939	Outfielder	Brooklyn Dodgers	
Bill Parks	April 26, 1875	April 22, 1876	Utility player	Washington Nationals (NA), Philadelphia Athletics (1860–76), Boston Red Caps	
Derek Parks	September 11, 1992	August 5, 1994	Catcher	Minnesota Twins	
Slicker Parks	July 11, 1921	September 4, 1921	Pitcher	Detroit Tigers	
Chris Parmelee	September 6, 2011		First baseman	Minnesota Twins	
Roy Parmelee	September 28, 1929	June 10, 1939	Pitcher	New York Giants, St. Louis Cardinals, Chicago Cubs, Philadelphia Athletics	
Bobby Parnell	September 15, 2008		Pitcher	New York Mets	
Mel Parnell	April 20, 1947	September 29, 1956	Pitcher	Boston Red Sox	
Rube Parnham	September 20, 1916	September 24, 1917	Pitcher	Philadelphia Athletics	
Chad Paronto	April 18, 2001		Pitcher	Baltimore Orioles, Cleveland Indians, Atlanta Braves, Houston Astros	
Jim Parque	May 26, 1998	May 21, 2003	Pitcher	Chicago White Sox, Tampa Bay Devil Rays	
James Parr	September 4, 2008		Pitcher	Atlanta Braves	
Gerardo Parra	May 13, 2009		Outfielder	Arizona Diamondbacks	
José Parra	May 7, 1995	July 17, 2004	Pitcher	Los Angeles Dodgers, Minnesota Twins, Pittsburgh Pirates, Arizona Diamondbacks, New York Mets	
Manny Parra	July 20, 2007		Pitcher	Milwaukee Brewers	
Jeff Parrett	April 11, 1986	September 28, 1996	Pitcher	Montreal Expos, Philadelphia Phillies, Atlanta Braves, Oakland Athletics, Colorado Rockies, St. Louis Cardinals	
Sam Parrilla	April 11, 1970	May 11, 1970	Outfielder	Philadelphia Phillies	
Andy Parrino	August 26, 2011		Utility player	San Diego Padres	
Steve Parris	June 21, 1995	June 17, 2003	Pitcher	Pittsburgh Pirates, Cincinnati Reds, Toronto Blue Jays, Tampa Bay Devil Rays	
John Parrish	July 24, 2000		Pitcher	Baltimore Orioles, Seattle Mariners, Toronto Blue Jays, Kansas City Royals	
Lance Parrish	September 5, 1977	September 23, 1995	Catcher	Detroit Tigers, Philadelphia Phillies, California Angels, Seattle Mariners, Cleveland Indians, Pittsburgh Pirates, Toronto Blue Jays	
Larry Parrish	September 6, 1974	October 2, 1988	Third baseman	Montreal Expos, Texas Rangers, Boston Red Sox	
Jiggs Parrott	July 11, 1892	June 6, 1895	Utility infielder	Chicago Colts	
Mike Parrott	September 5, 1977	September 29, 1981	Pitcher	Seattle Mariners	
Tom Parrott	June 18, 1893	September 26, 1896	Pitcher	Chicago Colts, Cincinnati Reds, St. Louis Browns (NL)	
Jiggs Parson	May 16, 1910	June 4, 1911	Pitcher	Boston Doves/Rustlers	
Bill Parsons	April 13, 1971	September 28, 1974	Pitcher	Milwaukee Brewers, Oakland	
Casey Parsons	May 31, 1981	August 9, 1987	Outfielder	Seattle Mariners, Chicago White Sox, Cleveland Indians	
Charlie Parsons	May 29, 1886	April 23, 1890	Pitcher	Boston Beaneaters, New York Metropolitans, Cleveland Spiders	
Dixie Parsons	August 16, 1939	October 3, 1943	Catcher	Detroit Tigers	
Tom Parsons	September 5, 1963	September 9, 1965	Pitcher	Pittsburgh Pirates, New York Mets	
Roy Partee	April 23, 1943	October 3, 1948	Catcher	Boston Red Sox, St. Louis Browns	
Stan Partenheimer	May 27, 1944	September 11, 1945	Pitcher	Boston Red Sox	
Steve Partenheimer	June 28, 1913	June 28, 1913	Third baseman	Detroit Tigers	
Jay Partridge	April 12, 1927	July 21, 1928	Second baseman	Brooklyn Robins	
Ben Paschal	August 16, 1915	October 6, 1929	Outfielder	Cleveland Indians, Boston Red Sox, New York Yankees	
Bill Paschall	September 20, 1978	September 25, 1981	Pitcher	Kansas City Royals	
Camilo Pascual	April 15, 1954	May 5, 1971	Pitcher	Washington Senators, Minnesota Twins, Washington Senators (1961–1971), Cincinnati Reds, Los Angeles Dodgers, Cleveland Indians	
Carlos Pascual	September 24, 1950	September 28, 1950	Pitcher	Washington Senators	
Valentino Pascucci	April 26, 2004		Outfielder	Montreal Expos, New York Mets	
Johnny Pasek	July 28, 1933	May 8, 1934	Catcher	Detroit Tigers, Chicago White Sox	
Larry Pashnick	April 10, 1982	June 19, 1984	Pitcher	Detroit Tigers, Minnesota Twins	
Dode Paskert	September 21, 1907	May 27, 1921	Outfielder	Cincinnati Reds, Philadelphia Phillies, Chicago Cubs	
Kevin Pasley	October 2, 1974	October 1, 1978	Catcher	Los Angeles Dodgers, Seattle Mariners	
Dan Pasqua	May 30, 1985	May 1, 1994	Outfielder	New York Yankees, Chicago White Sox	
Mike Pasquella	July 9, 1919	July 31, 1919	First baseman	Philadelphia Phillies, St. Louis Cardinals	
Claude Passeau	September 29, 1935	September 17, 1947	Pitcher	Pittsburgh Pirates, Philadelphia Phillies, Chicago Cubs	
Frank Pastore	April 4, 1979	September 5, 1986	Pitcher	Cincinnati Reds, Minnesota Twins	
Jim Pastorius	April 15, 1906	August 23, 1909	Pitcher	Brooklyn Superbas	
Cliff Pastornicky	June 14, 1983	June 27, 1983	Third baseman	Kansas City Royals	
Bob Pate	June 2, 1980	June 10, 1981	Outfielder	Montreal Expos	
Joe Pate	April 15, 1926	July 19, 1927	Pitcher	Philadelphia Athletics	
Freddie Patek	June 3, 1968	October 3, 1981	Shortstop	Pittsburgh Pirates, Kansas City Royals, California Angels	
Joe Paterson	April 2, 2011		Pitcher	Arizona Diamondbacks	
Bob Patrick	September 20, 1941	April 26, 1942	Outfielder	Detroit Tigers	
Bronswell Patrick	May 18, 1998	October 3, 1999	Pitcher	Milwaukee Brewers, San Francisco Giants	
Harry Pattee	April 14, 1908	September 29, 1908	Second baseman	Brooklyn Superbas	
Casey Patten	May 4, 1901	June 18, 1908	Pitcher	Washington Senators, Boston Red Sox	
Bob Patterson	September 2, 1985	July 11, 1998	Pitcher	San Diego Padres, Pittsburgh Pirates, Texas Rangers, California Angels, Chicago Cubs	
Clare Patterson	September 5, 1909	October 5, 1909	Outfielder	Cincinnati Reds	
Corey Patterson	September 18, 2000		Outfielder	Chicago Cubs, Baltimore Orioles, Cincinnati Reds, Washington Nationals, Milwaukee Brewers, Toronto Blue Jays, St. Louis Cardinals	
Danny Patterson	July 26, 1996	August 1, 2004	Pitcher	Texas Rangers, Detroit Tigers	
Daryl Patterson	April 10, 1968	September 14, 1974	Pitcher	Detroit Tigers, Oakland Athletics, St. Louis Cardinals, Pittsburgh Pirates	
Dave Patterson	June 9, 1979	September 27, 1979	Pitcher	Los Angeles Dodgers	
Eric Patterson	August 6, 2007		Utility player	Chicago Cubs, Oakland Athletics, Boston Red Sox, San Diego Padres	
George Patterson	April 24, 1884	April 24, 1884	Outfielder	Philadelphia Keystones	
Gil Patterson	April 19, 1977	August 27, 1977	Pitcher	New York Yankees	
Ham Patterson	May 18, 1909	August 30, 1909	Utility player	St. Louis Browns, Chicago White Sox	
Hank Patterson	September 5, 1932	September 5, 1932	Catcher	Boston Red Sox	
Jarrod Patterson	June 16, 2001	September 28, 2003	Third baseman	Detroit Tigers, Kansas City Royals	
Jeff Patterson	April 30, 1995	May 7, 1995	Pitcher	New York Yankees	
John Patterson (IF)	April 6, 1992	September 26, 1995	Second baseman	San Francisco Giants	
John Patterson (P)	July 20, 2002	May 5, 2007	Pitcher	Arizona Diamondbacks, Montreal Expos/Washington Nationals	
Ken Patterson	July 8, 1988	April 24, 1994	Pitcher	Chicago White Sox, Chicago Cubs, California Angels	
Mike Patterson	April 15, 1981	October 3, 1982	Outfielder	Oakland Athletics, New York Yankees	
Pat Patterson	April 14, 1921	June 29, 1921	Third baseman	New York Giants	
Reggie Patterson	August 13, 1981	October 6, 1985	Pitcher	Chicago White Sox, Chicago Cubs	
Roy Patterson	April 24, 1901	September 16, 1907	Pitcher	Chicago White Stockings (AL)/White Sox	
Scott Patterson	June 1, 2008		Pitcher	New York Yankees, San Diego Padres	
Tom Patterson	May 18, 1871	September 8, 1875	Outfielder	New York Mutuals, Eckford of Brooklyn, Brooklyn Atlantics	
Marty Pattin	May 14, 1968	October 1, 1980	Pitcher	California Angels, Seattle Pilots, Milwaukee Brewers, Boston Red Sox, Kansas City Royals	
Jimmy Pattison	April 18, 1929	May 13, 1929	Pitcher	Brooklyn Robins	
Bill Patton	June 29, 1935	September 29, 1935	Catcher	Philadelphia Athletics	
David Patton	April 8, 2009		Pitcher	Chicago Cubs	
Gene Patton	June 17, 1944	June 17, 1944	Pinch runner	Boston Braves	
Harry Patton	August 22, 1910	August 22, 1910	Pitcher	St. Louis Cardinals	
Tom Patton	April 30, 1957	April 30, 1957	Catcher	Baltimore Orioles	
Troy Patton	August 25, 2007		Pitcher	Houston Astros, Baltimore Orioles	
Josh Paul	September 7, 1999	September 26, 2007	Catcher	Chicago White Sox, Chicago Cubs, Anaheim Angels/Los Angeles Angels of Anaheim, Tampa Bay Devil Rays	
Lou Paul	September 5, 1876	September 8, 1876	Catcher	Philadelphia Athletics (1860–76)	
Mike Paul	May 27, 1968	April 16, 1974	Pitcher	Cleveland Indians, Texas Rangers, Chicago Cubs	
Xavier Paul	May 7, 2009		Outfielder	Los Angeles Dodgers, Pittsburgh Pirates	
Carlos Paula	September 6, 1954	June 23, 1956	Outfielder	Washington Senators	
Gene Paulette	June 16, 1911	October 3, 1920	First baseman	New York Giants, St. Louis Browns, St. Louis Cardinals, Philadelphia Phillies	
David Pauley	May 31, 2006		Pitcher	Boston Red Sox, Seattle Mariners, Detroit Tigers	
Felipe Paulino	September 5, 2007		Pitcher	Houston Astros, Colorado Rockies, Kansas City Royals	
Ronny Paulino	September 25, 2005		Catcher	Pittsburgh Pirates, Florida Marlins, New York Mets	
Gil Paulsen	October 3, 1925	October 3, 1925	Pitcher	St. Louis Cardinals	
Si Pauxtis	September 18, 1909	October 5, 1909	Catcher	Cincinnati Reds	
Carl Pavano	May 23, 1998		Pitcher	Montreal Expos, Florida Marlins, New York Yankees, Cleveland Indians, Minnesota Twins	
Dave Pavlas	August 21, 1990	September 29, 1996	Pitcher	Chicago Cubs, New York Yankees	
Don Pavletich	April 20, 1957	September 1, 1971	Catcher	Cincinnati Redlegs/Reds, Chicago White Sox, Boston Red Sox	
Roger Pavlik	May 2, 1992	April 23, 1998	Pitcher	Texas Rangers	
Ted Pawelek	September 13, 1946	September 26, 1946	Catcher	Chicago Cubs	
Stan Pawloski	September 24, 1955	September 25, 1955	Second baseman	Cleveland Indians	
John Pawlowski	September 19, 1987	May 10, 1988	Pitcher	Chicago White Sox	
Mike Paxton	May 25, 1977	May 3, 1980	Pitcher	Boston Red Sox, Cleveland Indians	
Fred Payne	April 21, 1906	September 4, 1911	Catcher	Detroit Tigers, Chicago White Sox	
George Payne	May 8, 1920	October 3, 1920	Pitcher	Chicago White Sox	
Harley Payne	April 18, 1896	June 8, 1899	Pitcher	Brooklyn Bridegrooms, Pittsburgh Pirates	
Mike Payne	August 22, 1984	September 17, 1984	Pitcher	Atlanta Braves	
George Paynter	August 12, 1894	August 12, 1894	Outfielder	St. Louis Browns (NL)	
Jay Payton	September 1, 1998		Outfielder	New York Mets, Colorado Rockies, San Diego Padres, Boston Red Sox, Oakland Athletics, Baltimore Orioles	
Mike Pazik	May 11, 1975	April 22, 1977	Pitcher	Minnesota Twins	
Brad Peacock	September 6, 2011		Pitcher	Washington Nationals	
Johnny Peacock	September 23, 1937	September 23, 1945	Catcher	Boston Red Sox, Philadelphia Phillies, Brooklyn Dodgers	
Elias Peak	April 19, 1884	August 7, 1884	Second baseman	Boston Reds (UA), Philadelphia Keystones	
Bunny Pearce	July 1, 1908	May 30, 1909	Catcher	Cincinnati Reds	
Dickey Pearce	May 18, 1871	October 6, 1877	Shortstop	New York Mutuals, Brooklyn Atlantics, St. Louis Brown Stockings	
Frank Pearce (1870s P)	October 4, 1876	October 4, 1876	Pitcher	Louisville Grays	
Frank Pearce (1930s P)	April 20, 1933	May 15, 1935	Pitcher	Philadelphia Phillies	
Harry Pearce	October 2, 1917	September 11, 1919	Second baseman	Philadelphia Phillies	
Jim Pearce	September 8, 1949	May 3, 1955	Pitcher	Washington Senators, Cincinnati Redlegs	
Josh Pearce	April 20, 2002	May 8, 2004	Pitcher	St. Louis Cardinals	
Steve Pearce	September 1, 2007		Outfielder	Pittsburgh Pirates	
Frank Pears	October 6, 1889	August 1, 1893	Pitcher	Kansas City Cowboys (AA), St. Louis Browns (NL)	
Albie Pearson	April 14, 1958	July 16, 1966	Outfielder	Washington Senators, Baltimore Orioles, Los Angeles/California Angels	
Alex Pearson	August 1, 1902	August 6, 1903	Pitcher	St. Louis Cardinals, Cleveland Naps	
Ike Pearson	June 6, 1939	September 19, 1948	Pitcher	Philadelphia Phillies, Chicago White Sox	
Jason Pearson	June 4, 2002	August 20, 2003	Pitcher	San Diego Padres, St. Louis Cardinals	
Monte Pearson	April 22, 1932	August 5, 1941	Pitcher	Cleveland Indians, New York Yankees, Cincinnati Reds	
Terry Pearson	April 4, 2002	April 13, 2002	Pitcher	Detroit Tigers	
Marv Peasley	September 27, 1910	October 6, 1910	Pitcher	Detroit Tigers	
Jake Peavy	June 22, 2002		Pitcher	San Diego Padres, Chicago White Sox	
George Pechiney	August 4, 1885	June 24, 1887	Pitcher	Cincinnati Red Stockings (AA), Cleveland Blues (NL)	
Charlie Pechous	September 14, 1915	September 30, 1917	Third baseman	Chicago Whales, Chicago Cubs	
Hal Peck	May 13, 1943	September 25, 1949	Outfielder	Brooklyn Dodgers, Philadelphia Athletics, Cleveland Indians	
Roger Peckinpaugh	September 15, 1910	September 25, 1927	Shortstop	Cleveland Naps, New York Yankees, Washington Senators, Chicago White Sox	
Bill Pecota	September 19, 1986	August 11, 1994	Utility infielder	Kansas City Royals, New York Mets, Atlanta Braves	
Les Peden	April 17, 1953	May 6, 1953	Catcher	Washington Senators	
Stu Pederson	September 8, 1985	October 6, 1985	Outfielder	Los Angeles Dodgers	
Jorge Pedre	September 7, 1991	September 28, 1992	Catcher	Kansas City Royals, Chicago Cubs	
Al Pedrique	April 14, 1987	June 21, 1989	Shortstop	New York Mets, Pittsburgh Pirates, Detroit Tigers	
Chick Pedroes	August 21, 1902	August 22, 1902	Outfielder	Chicago Orphans	
Dustin Pedroia	August 22, 2006		Second baseman	Boston Red Sox	
Steve Peek	April 16, 1941	September 6, 1941	Pitcher	New York Yankees	
Homer Peel	September 13, 1927	June 25, 1934	Outfielder	St. Louis Cardinals, Philadelphia Phillies, New York Giants	
Jack Peerson	September 7, 1935	September 27, 1936	Shortstop	Philadelphia Athletics	
Red Peery	September 22, 1927	September 27, 1929	Pitcher	Pittsburgh Pirates, Boston Braves	
Charlie Peete	July 17, 1956	August 16, 1956	Outfielder	St. Louis Cardinals	
Carlos Peguero	April 19, 2011		Outfielder	Seattle Mariners	
Jailen Peguero	June 8, 2007		Pitcher	Arizona Diamondbacks	
Julio Peguero	April 8, 1992	June 3, 1992	Outfielder	Philadelphia Phillies	
Steve Pegues	July 6, 1994	September 29, 1995	Outfielder	Cincinnati Reds, Pittsburgh Pirates	
Heinie Peitz	October 15, 1892	June 1, 1913	Catcher	St. Louis Browns (NL), Cincinnati Reds, Pittsburgh Pirates, St. Louis Cardinals	
Joe Peitz	July 5, 1894	July 11, 1894	Outfielder	St. Louis Browns (NL)	
Alex Pelaez	May 16, 2002	May 18, 2002	Utility infielder	San Diego Padres	
Mike Pelfrey	July 8, 2006		Pitcher	New York Mets	
Eddie Pellagrini	April 22, 1946	September 24, 1954	Utility infielder	Boston Red Sox, St. Louis Browns, Philadelphia Phillies, Cincinnati Reds, Pittsburgh Pirates	
Kit Pellow	August 14, 2002	August 22, 2004	Utility player	Kansas City Royals, Colorado Rockies	
Louis Pelouze	July 24, 1886	July 24, 1886	Outfielder	St. Louis Maroons	
Dan Peltier	June 26, 1992	July 17, 1996	Outfielder	Texas Rangers, San Francisco Giants	
Barney Pelty	August 20, 1903	August 10, 1912	Pitcher	St. Louis Browns, Washington Senators	
John Peltz	May 1, 1884	October 13, 1890	Outfielder	Indianapolis Hoosiers (AA), Baltimore Orioles (19th century), Brooklyn Gladiators, Syracuse Stars (AA), Toledo Maumees	
Dave Pember	September 3, 2002	September 26, 2002	Pitcher	Milwaukee Brewers	
Brock Pemberton	September 10, 1974	September 23, 1975	First baseman	New York Mets	
Rudy Pemberton	April 26, 1995	June 2, 1997	Outfielder	Detroit Tigers, Boston Red Sox	
Alejandro Peña	September 14, 1981	April 13, 1996	Pitcher	Los Angeles Dodgers, New York Mets, Atlanta Braves, Pittsburgh Pirates, Boston Red Sox, Florida Marlins	
Ángel Peña	September 8, 1998	June 1, 2001	Catcher	Los Angeles Dodgers	
Bert Peña	September 14, 1981	July 19, 1987	Shortstop	Houston Astros	
Brayan Peña	May 23, 2005		Catcher	Atlanta Braves, Kansas City Royals	
Carlos Peña	September 5, 2001		First baseman	Texas Rangers, Oakland Athletics, Detroit Tigers, Boston Red Sox, Tampa Bay Devil Rays/Rays, Chicago Cubs	
Elvis Peña	September 2, 2000	October 7, 2001	Second baseman	Colorado Rockies, Milwaukee Brewers	
Gerónimo Peña	September 5, 1990	September 29, 1996	Second baseman	St. Louis Cardinals, Cleveland Indians	
Hipólito Peña	September 1, 1986	September 30, 1988	Pitcher	Pittsburgh Pirates, New York Yankees	
Jesús Peña	August 7, 1999	October 1, 2000	Pitcher	Chicago White Sox, Boston Red Sox	
Jim Pena	July 7, 1992	October 3, 1992	Pitcher	San Francisco Giants	
José Peña	June 1, 1969	July 14, 1972	Pitcher	Cincinnati Reds, Los Angeles Dodgers	
Juan Peña	May 8, 1999	May 14, 1999	Pitcher	Boston Red Sox	
Orlando Peña	August 24, 1958	May 1, 1975	Pitcher	Cincinnati Reds, Kansas City Athletics, Detroit Tigers, Cleveland Indians, Pittsburgh Pirates, Baltimore Orioles, St. Louis Cardinals, California Angels	
Ramiro Peña	April 6, 2009		Utility infielder	New York Yankees	
Ramón Peña	April 27, 1989	August 5, 1989	Pitcher	Detroit Tigers	
Roberto Peña	April 12, 1965	September 30, 1971	Shortstop	Chicago Cubs, Philadelphia Phillies, San Diego Padres, Oakland Athletics, Milwaukee Brewers	
Tony Peña (C)	September 1, 1980	September 28, 1997	Catcher	Pittsburgh Pirates, St. Louis Cardinals, Boston Red Sox, Cleveland Indians, Chicago White Sox, Houston Astros	
Tony Peña Jr.	April 13, 2006		Shortstop	Atlanta Braves, Kansas City Royals	
Tony Peña (P)	July 18, 2006		Pitcher	Arizona Diamondbacks, Chicago White Sox	
Wily Mo Peña	September 10, 2002		Outfielder	Cincinnati Reds, Boston Red Sox, Washington Nationals, Arizona Diamondbacks, Seattle Mariners	
Elmer Pence	August 23, 1922	August 23, 1922	Outfielder	Chicago White Sox	
Hunter Pence	April 28, 2007		Outfielder	Houston Astros, Philadelphia Phillies	
Rusty Pence	May 13, 1921	May 30, 1921	Pitcher	Chicago White Sox	
Jim Pendleton	April 17, 1953	September 30, 1962	Outfielder	Milwaukee Braves, Pittsburgh Pirates, Cincinnati Reds, Houston Colt .45s	
Lance Pendleton	April 15, 2011		Pitcher	New York Yankees, Houston Astros	
Terry Pendleton	July 18, 1984	September 25, 1998	Third baseman	St. Louis Cardinals, Atlanta Braves, Florida Marlins, Cincinnati Reds, Kansas City Royals	
Hayden Penn	May 28, 2005		Pitcher	Baltimore Orioles, Florida Marlins, Pittsburgh Pirates	
Shannon Penn	April 28, 1995	September 29, 1996	Utility player	Detroit Tigers	
Ken Penner	September 11, 1916	September 4, 1929	Pitcher	Cleveland Indians, Chicago Cubs	
Brad Pennington	April 17, 1993	September 22, 1998	Pitcher	Baltimore Orioles, Cincinnati Reds, Boston Red Sox, California Angels, Tampa Bay Devil Rays	
Cliff Pennington	August 12, 2008		Utility infielder	Oakland Athletics	
Kewpie Pennington	April 14, 1917	April 14, 1917	Pitcher	St. Louis Browns	
Herb Pennock β	May 14, 1912	August 27, 1934	Pitcher	Philadelphia Athletics, Boston Red Sox, New York Yankees	
Brad Penny	April 7, 2000		Pitcher	Florida Marlins, Los Angeles Dodgers, Boston Red Sox, San Francisco Giants, St. Louis Cardinals, Detroit Tigers	
Will Pennyfeather	June 27, 1992	April 17, 1994	Outfielder	Pittsburgh Pirates	
Paul Penson	April 21, 1954	May 30, 1954	Pitcher	Philadelphia Phillies	
Gene Pentz	July 29, 1975	May 3, 1978	Pitcher	Detroit Tigers, Houston Astros	
Jimmy Peoples	May 29, 1884	July 23, 1889	Catcher	Cincinnati Red Stockings (AA), Brooklyn Grays/Bridegrooms, Columbus Solons	
Joe Pepitone	April 10, 1962	May 25, 1973	First baseman	New York Yankees, Houston Astros, Chicago Cubs, Atlanta Braves	
Henry Peploski	September 19, 1929	October 6, 1929	Third baseman	Boston Braves	
Pepper Peploski	June 24, 1913	June 26, 1913	Third baseman	Detroit Tigers	
Bob Pepper	July 23, 1915	July 23, 1915	Pitcher	Philadelphia Athletics	
Don Pepper	September 10, 1966	October 2, 1966	First baseman	Detroit Tigers	
Laurin Pepper	July 4, 1954	June 6, 1957	Pitcher	Pittsburgh Pirates	
Ray Pepper	April 15, 1932	September 25, 1936	Outfielder	St. Louis Cardinals, St. Louis Browns	
Harrison Peppers	June 30, 1894	July 6, 1894	Pitcher	Louisville Colonels	
Jhonny Peralta	June 12, 2003		Shortstop	Cleveland Indians, Detroit Tigers	
Joel Peralta	May 25, 2005		Pitcher	Los Angeles Dodgers, Kansas City Royals, Colorado Rockies, Washington Nationals, Tampa Bay Rays	
Luis Peraza	April 9, 1969	July 4, 1969	Pitcher	Philadelphia Phillies	
Oswaldo Peraza	April 4, 1988	September 2, 1988	Pitcher	Baltimore Orioles	
Troy Percival	April 26, 1995		Pitcher	California/Anaheim Angels, Detroit Tigers, St. Louis Cardinals, Tampa Bay Rays	
Jack Perconte	September 13, 1980	October 4, 1986	Second baseman	Los Angeles Dodgers, Cleveland Indians, Seattle Mariners, Chicago White Sox	
Luis Perdomo	April 15, 2009	October 3, 2012	Pitcher	San Diego Padres, Minnesota Twins	
Hub Perdue	April 19, 1911	September 30, 1915	Pitcher	Boston Rustlers/Braves, St. Louis Cardinals	
Antonio Pérez	May 14, 2003	September 28, 2006	Utility infielder	Tampa Bay Devil Rays, Los Angeles Dodgers, Oakland Athletics	
Beltrán Pérez	September 2, 2006	September 30, 2006	Pitcher	Washington Nationals	
Carlos Pérez	April 27, 1995	September 5, 2000	Pitcher	Montreal Expos, Los Angeles Dodgers	
Chris Perez	May 16, 2008		Pitcher	St. Louis Cardinals, Cleveland Indians	
Danny Perez	June 30, 1996	July 5, 1996	Outfielder	Milwaukee Brewers	
Eddie Pérez	September 10, 1995	September 27, 2005	Catcher	Atlanta Braves, Cleveland Indians, Milwaukee Brewers	
Eduardo Pérez	July 27, 1993	September 29, 2006	First baseman	California Angels, Cincinnati Reds, St. Louis Cardinals, Tampa Bay Devil Rays, Cleveland Indians, Seattle Mariners	
Fernando Perez	September 5, 2008		Outfielder	Tampa Bay Rays	
George Perez	April 17, 1958	May 6, 1958	Pitcher	Pittsburgh Pirates	
Juan Pérez	September 7, 2006		Pitcher	Pittsburgh Pirates, Philadelphia Phillies	
Luis Pérez	April 16, 2011		Pitcher	Toronto Blue Jays	
Marty Perez	September 9, 1969	September 16, 1978	Utility infielder	California Angels, Atlanta Braves, San Francisco Giants, New York Yankees, Oakland Athletics	
Mélido Pérez	September 4, 1987	September 13, 1995	Pitcher	Kansas City Royals, Chicago White Sox, New York Yankees	
Miguel Pérez	September 7, 2005	September 28, 2005	Catcher	Cincinnati Reds	
Mike Pérez	September 5, 1990	August 17, 1997	Pitcher	St. Louis Cardinals, Chicago Cubs, Kansas City Royals	
Neifi Pérez	August 31, 1996	July 5, 2007	Shortstop	Colorado Rockies, Kansas City Royals, San Francisco Giants, Chicago Cubs, Detroit Tigers	
Odalis Pérez	September 1, 1998		Pitcher	Atlanta Braves, Los Angeles Dodgers, Kansas City Royals, Washington Nationals	
Óliver Pérez	June 16, 2002		Pitcher	San Diego Padres, Pittsburgh Pirates, New York Mets	
Pascual Pérez	May 7, 1980	October 2, 1991	Pitcher	Pittsburgh Pirates, Atlanta Braves, Montreal Expos, New York Yankees	
Rafael Pérez	April 20, 2006		Pitcher	Cleveland Indians	
Robert Pérez	July 20, 1994	July 2, 2001	Outfielder	Toronto Blue Jays, Seattle Mariners, Montreal Expos, New York Yankees, Milwaukee Brewers	
Salvador Pérez	August 10, 2011		Catcher	Kansas City Royals	
Santiago Pérez	June 3, 2000	July 1, 2001	Utility player	Milwaukee Brewers, San Diego Padres	
Timo Pérez	September 1, 2000		Outfielder	New York Mets, Chicago White Sox, St. Louis Cardinals, Detroit Tigers	
Tomás Pérez	May 3, 1995	April 21, 2008	Utility infielder	Toronto Blue Jays, Philadelphia Phillies, Tampa Bay Devil Rays, Houston Astros	
Tony Pérez β	July 26, 1964	October 5, 1986	First baseman	Cincinnati Reds, Montreal Expos, Boston Red Sox, Philadelphia Phillies	
Yorkis Pérez	September 30, 1991	September 10, 2002	Pitcher	Chicago Cubs, Florida Marlins, New York Mets, Philadelphia Phillies, Houston Astros, Baltimore Orioles	
Tony Perezchica	September 7, 1988	May 20, 1992	Utility infielder	San Francisco Giants, Cleveland Indians	
Matt Perisho	May 27, 1997	September 2, 2005	Pitcher	Anaheim Angels, Texas Rangers, Detroit Tigers, Florida Marlins, Boston Red Sox	
Broderick Perkins	July 7, 1978	September 23, 1984	First baseman	San Diego Padres, Cleveland Indians	
Cecil Perkins	July 5, 1967	July 8, 1967	Pitcher	New York Yankees	
Charlie Perkins	June 27, 1930	May 24, 1934	Pitcher	Philadelphia Athletics, Brooklyn Dodgers	
Cy Perkins	September 25, 1915	September 30, 1934	Catcher	Philadelphia Athletics, New York Yankees, Detroit Tigers	
Dan Perkins	April 7, 1999	October 2, 2000	Pitcher	Minnesota Twins	
Glen Perkins	September 21, 2006		Pitcher	Minnesota Twins	
John Perkovich	May 6, 1950	May 6, 1950	Pitcher	Chicago White Sox	
Harry Perkowski	September 13, 1947	September 18, 1955	Pitcher	Cincinnati Reds/Redlegs, Chicago Cubs	
Jon Perlman	September 6, 1985	July 8, 1988	Pitcher	Chicago Cubs, San Francisco Giants, Cleveland Indians	
Sam Perlozzo	September 13, 1977	September 13, 1979	Second baseman	Minnesota Twins, San Diego Padres	
Len Perme	September 8, 1942	June 9, 1946	Pitcher	Chicago White Sox	
Hub Pernoll	April 25, 1910	May 13, 1912	Pitcher	Detroit Tigers	
Ron Perranoski	April 14, 1961	June 17, 1973	Pitcher	Los Angeles Dodgers, Minnesota Twins, Detroit Tigers, California Angels	
Bill Perrin	September 30, 1934	September 30, 1934	Pitcher	Cleveland Indians	
John Perrin	July 11, 1921	July 12, 1921	Outfielder	Boston Red Sox	
Nig Perrine	April 11, 1907	July 9, 1907	Utility infielder	Washington Senators	
George Perring	April 25, 1908	October 3, 1915	Third baseman	Cleveland Indians, Kansas City Packers	
Pol Perritt	September 7, 1912	July 3, 1921	Pitcher	St. Louis Cardinals, New York Giants, Detroit Tigers	
Bob Perry	May 17, 1963	October 3, 1964	Outfielder	Los Angeles Angels	
Boyd Perry	May 23, 1941	September 20, 1941	Shortstop	Detroit Tigers	
Chan Perry	August 5, 2000	August 11, 2002	Utility player	Cleveland Indians, Kansas City Royals	
Clay Perry	September 2, 1908	September 13, 1908	Third baseman	Detroit Tigers	
Gaylord Perry β	April 14, 1962	September 21, 1983	Pitcher	San Francisco Giants, Cleveland Indians, Texas Rangers, San Diego Padres, New York Yankees, Atlanta Braves, Seattle Mariners, Kansas City Royals	
Gerald Perry	August 11, 1983	August 24, 1995	First baseman	Atlanta Braves, Kansas City Royals, St. Louis Cardinals	
Hank Perry	April 12, 1912	May 25, 1912	Outfielder	Detroit Tigers	
Herbert Perry	May 3, 1994	September 10, 2004	Third baseman	Cleveland Indians, Tampa Bay Devil Rays, Chicago White Sox, Texas Rangers	
Jason Perry	July 4, 2008		Outfielder	Atlanta Braves	
Jim Perry	April 23, 1959	August 5, 1975	Pitcher	Cleveland Indians, Minnesota Twins, Detroit Tigers, Oakland Athletics	
Pat Perry	September 12, 1985	September 30, 1990	Pitcher	St. Louis Cardinals, Cincinnati Reds, Chicago Cubs, Los Angeles Dodgers	
Ryan Perry	April 8, 2009		Pitcher	Detroit Tigers	
Scott Perry	May 13, 1915	June 1, 1921	Pitcher	St. Louis Browns, Chicago Cubs, Cincinnati Reds, Philadelphia Athletics	
Parson Perryman	April 14, 1915	July 13, 1915	Pitcher	St. Louis Browns	
Robert Person	September 18, 1995	June 7, 2003	Pitcher	New York Mets, Toronto Blue Jays, Philadelphia Phillies, Boston Red Sox	
Bill Pertica	August 7, 1918	April 20, 1923	Pitcher	Boston Red Sox, St. Louis Cardinals	
Stan Perzanowski	June 20, 1971	September 27, 1978	Pitcher	Chicago White Sox, Texas Rangers, Minnesota Twins	
Johnny Pesky	April 14, 1942	September 24, 1954	Utility infielder	Boston Red Sox, Detroit Tigers, Washington Senators	
Vinnie Pestano	September 23, 2010		Pitcher	Cleveland Indians	
Roberto Petagine	April 4, 1994	July 8, 2006	First baseman	Houston Astros, San Diego Padres, New York Mets, Cincinnati Reds, Boston Red Sox, Seattle Mariners	
Jeff Peterek	August 14, 1989	September 22, 1989	Pitcher	Milwaukee Brewers	
Bill Peterman	April 26, 1942	April 26, 1942	Catcher	Philadelphia Phillies	
Chris Peters	July 19, 1996	May 28, 2001	Pitcher	Pittsburgh Pirates, Montreal Expos	
Gary Peters	September 10, 1959	September 23, 1972	Pitcher	Chicago White Sox, Boston Red Sox	
John Peters (SS)	May 23, 1874	June 11, 1884	Shortstop	Chicago White Stockings, Milwaukee Grays, Providence Grays, Buffalo Bisons (NL), Pittsburgh Alleghenys	
John Peters (C)	May 1, 1915	September 25, 1922	Catcher	Detroit Tigers, Cleveland Indians, Philadelphia Phillies	
Ray Peters	June 4, 1970	June 9, 1970	Pitcher	Milwaukee Brewers	
Rick Peters	September 8, 1979	June 29, 1986	Outfielder	Detroit Tigers, Oakland Athletics	
Rube Peters	April 13, 1912	September 21, 1914	Pitcher	Chicago White Sox, Brooklyn Tip-Tops	
Rusty Peters	April 14, 1936	September 28, 1947	Utility infielder	Philadelphia Athletics, Cleveland Indians, St. Louis Browns	
Steve Peters	August 11, 1987	October 2, 1988	Pitcher	St. Louis Cardinals	
Bryan Petersen	May 7, 2010		Outfielder	Florida Marlins	
Chris Petersen	May 25, 1999	June 4, 1999	Second baseman	Colorado Rockies	
Adam Peterson (1990s P)	September 19, 1987	August 6, 1991	Pitcher	Chicago White Sox, San Diego Padres	
Adam Peterson (2000s P)	June 24, 2004	June 28, 2004	Pitcher	Toronto Blue Jays	
Bob Peterson	April 18, 1906	October 5, 1907	Catcher	Boston Americans	
Buddy Peterson	September 14, 1955	September 29, 1957	Shortstop	Chicago White Sox, Baltimore Orioles	
Cap Peterson	September 12, 1962	September 28, 1969	Outfielder	San Francisco Giants, Washington Senators (1961–1971), Cleveland Indians	
Fritz Peterson	April 15, 1966	June 19, 1976	Pitcher	New York Yankees, Cleveland Indians, Texas Rangers	
Hardy Peterson	May 5, 1955	August 8, 1959	Catcher	Pittsburgh Pirates	
Jim Peterson	July 9, 1931	April 24, 1937	Pitcher	Philadelphia Athletics, Brooklyn Dodgers	
Kent Peterson	July 15, 1944	July 18, 1953	Pitcher	Cincinnati Reds, Philadelphia Phillies	
Kyle Peterson	July 19, 1999	July 5, 2001	Pitcher	Milwaukee Brewers	
Sid Peterson	May 4, 1943	May 12, 1943	Pitcher	St. Louis Browns	
Gregorio Petit	May 18, 2008		Utility infielder	Oakland Athletics	
Yusmeiro Petit	May 14, 2006		Pitcher	Florida Marlins, Arizona Diamondbacks	
Mark Petkovsek	June 8, 1991	October 4, 2001	Pitcher	Texas Rangers, Pittsburgh Pirates, St. Louis Cardinals, Anaheim Angels	
Ted Petoskey	September 9, 1934	June 20, 1935	Outfielder	Cincinnati Reds	
Geno Petralli	September 4, 1982	October 2, 1993	Catcher	Toronto Blue Jays, Texas Rangers	
Ben Petrick	September 1, 1999	September 28, 2003	Catcher	Colorado Rockies, Detroit Tigers	
Billy Petrick	June 27, 2007		Pitcher	Chicago Cubs	
Rico Petrocelli	September 21, 1963	September 14, 1976	Utility infielder	Boston Red Sox	
Dan Petry	July 8, 1979	October 5, 1991	Pitcher	Detroit Tigers, California Angels, Atlanta Braves, Boston Red Sox	
Pat Pettee	April 8, 1891	April 14, 1891	Second baseman	Louisville Colonels	
Jay Pettibone	September 11, 1983	October 1, 1983	Pitcher	Minnesota Twins	
Ned Pettigrew	April 23, 1914	April 24, 1914	Pinch hitter	Buffalo Buffeds	
Joe Pettini	July 10, 1980	October 2, 1983	Shortstop	San Francisco Giants	
Gary Pettis	September 13, 1982	September 10, 1992	Outfielder	California Angels, Detroit Tigers, Texas Rangers, San Diego Padres	
Bob Pettit	September 3, 1887	October 4, 1891	Outfielder	Chicago White Stockings, Milwaukee Brewers (AA)	
Chris Pettit	September 11, 2009		Outfielder	Los Angeles Angels of Anaheim	
Leon Pettit	April 18, 1935	June 8, 1937	Pitcher	Washington Senators, Philadelphia Phillies	
Paul Pettit	May 4, 1951	September 19, 1953	Pitcher	Pittsburgh Pirates	
Andy Pettitte	April 29, 1995	October 2, 2010	Pitcher	New York Yankees, Houston Astros	
Charlie Petty	July 30, 1889	August 17, 1894	Pitcher	Cincinnati Red Stockings (AA), New York Giants, Washington Senators (1891–99), Cleveland Spiders	
Jesse Petty	April 14, 1921	September 28, 1930	Pitcher	Cleveland Indians, Brooklyn Robins, Pittsburgh Pirates, Chicago Cubs	
Adam Pettyjohn	July 16, 2001		Pitcher	Detroit Tigers, Cincinnati Reds	
Marty Pevey	May 16, 1989	June 29, 1989	Catcher	Montreal Expos	
Larry Pezold	July 27, 1914	September 30, 1914	Third baseman	Cleveland Naps	
Pretzel Pezzullo	April 18, 1935	April 15, 1936	Pitcher	Philadelphia Phillies	
Bill Pfann	June 16, 1894	June 16, 1894	Pitcher	Cincinnati Reds	
Big Jeff Pfeffer	April 15, 1905	October 9, 1911	Pitcher	Chicago Cubs, Boston Beaneaters/Doves/Rustlers	
Fred Pfeffer	May 1, 1884	June 14, 1897	Second baseman	Troy Trojans, Chicago White Stockings, Chicago Pirates, Chicago Colts, Louisville Colonels	
Jeff Pfeffer	April 16, 1911	September 26, 1924	Pitcher	St. Louis Browns, Brooklyn Superbas/Robins, St. Louis Cardinals, Pittsburgh Pirates	
Monte Pfeffer	September 29, 1913	September 29, 1913	Shortstop	Philadelphia Athletics	
Bobby Pfeil	June 26, 1969	September 6, 1971	Third baseman	New York Mets, Philadelphia Phillies	
Jack Pfiester	September 8, 1903	May 10, 1911	Pitcher	Pittsburgh Pirates, Chicago Cubs	
Dan Pfister	September 9, 1961	July 31, 1964	Pitcher	Kansas City Athletics	
George Pfister	September 27, 1941	September 27, 1941	Catcher	Brooklyn Dodgers	
Lee Pfund	April 21, 1945	July 5, 1945	Pitcher	Brooklyn Dodgers	
Monte Pfyl	July 30, 1907	July 30, 1907	First baseman	New York Giants	
