= Regis Leheny =

American baseball player (1908–1976)

- Pitcher
- Born: January 5, 1908; Pittsburgh, Pennsylvania
- Died: November 2, 1976 (aged 68); Pittsburgh, Pennsylvania
- Batted: Left Threw: Left

MLB debut
- May 21, 1932, for the Boston Red Sox

Last MLB appearance
- May 22, 1932, for the Boston Red Sox

MLB statistics
- Win–loss record: 0–0
- Strikeouts: 1
- Earned run average: 16.88
- Stats at Baseball Reference

Teams
- Boston Red Sox (1932)

Regis Francis Leheny (January 5, 1908 – November 2, 1976) was a relief pitcher in Major League Baseball who played briefly for the Boston Red Sox during the 1932 season. Listed at 6 ft 0 in (1.83 m), 180 lb., Leheny batted and threw left-handed. He was born in Pittsburgh, Pennsylvania.

In a two-game career, Leheny posted a 16.88 ERA with one strikeout and three walks in 2.2 innings of work. He did not have a decision.

Leheny died in his hometown of Pittsburgh, Pennsylvania, at age 68.

== See also ==
- 1932 Boston Red Sox season
