= List of Boston Red Sox team records =

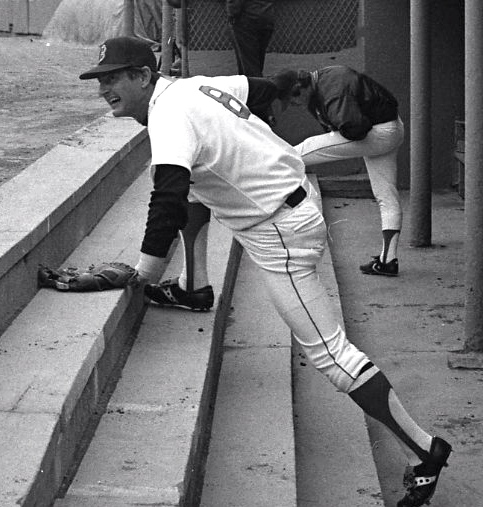
Carl Yastrzemski, who played in Major League Baseball for 23 seasons, all with the Boston Red Sox, holds multiple team records.

The Boston Red Sox are a Major League Baseball (MLB) team based in Boston, Massachusetts. They have competed in the American League (AL) since it was founded in 1901, and in the AL East division since it was formed in 1969. Note that before 1908, the team was known as the Boston Americans. The list below documents players (by careers and seasons) and teams (by seasons) that hold particular club records.

== Individual player records ==
Note that these records reflect statistics only for a player's tenure with the Red Sox. For example, David Ortiz hit a total of 541 home runs during his MLB career; 483 with the Red Sox and 58 with the Minnesota Twins—thus, Ted Williams' 521 home runs, all hit with the Red Sox, is the team record. Similarly, the team record for wins with the Red Sox is 192, accomplished both by Roger Clemens and Cy Young, who had major league career win totals of 354 and 511, respectively.

Note that "rate" categories (such as batting average or earned run average) have thresholds (such as a minimum number of at bats or innings pitched) for eligibility.

Key
Italics	Statistic is ranked from low to high
**Bold**	MLB record

The below tables have been updated with records through the 2020 season.

=== Batting ===
Statistic	Career			Single season			
Statistic	Stat value	Player	Ref.	Stat value	Player	Season	Ref.
Batting average	.344	Ted Williams		.406	Ted Williams	1941	
On-base percentage	**.482**	Ted Williams		.553	Ted Williams	1941	
Slugging percentage	.634	Ted Williams		.735	Ted Williams	1941	
On-base plus slugging	1.116	Ted Williams		1.287	Ted Williams	1941	
Games played	3,308	Carl Yastrzemski		163	Jim Rice	1978	
At bats	11,988	Carl Yastrzemski		684	Nomar Garciaparra	1997	
Plate appearances	13,992	Carl Yastrzemski		758	Wade Boggs	1985	
Runs scored	1,816	Carl Yastrzemski		150	Ted Williams	1949	
Hits	3,419	Carl Yastrzemski		240	Wade Boggs	1985	
Total bases	5,539	Carl Yastrzemski		406	Jim Rice	1978	
Singles	2,262	Carl Yastrzemski		187	Wade Boggs	1985	
Doubles	646	Carl Yastrzemski		**67**	Earl Webb	1931	
Triples	130	Harry Hooper		22	Tris Speaker	1913	
Home runs	521	Ted Williams		54	David Ortiz	2006	
RBIs	1,844	Carl Yastrzemski		175	Jimmie Foxx	1938	
Walks	2,021	Ted Williams		162	Ted Williams	1947; 1949	
Strikeouts	1,643	Dwight Evans		187	Mike Napoli	2013	
Stolen bases	300	Harry Hooper		70	Jacoby Ellsbury	2009	
Runs created	2,393	Ted Williams		183	Jimmie Foxx; Ted Williams	1938; 1941	
Extra-base hits	1,157	Carl Yastrzemski		92	Jimmie Foxx	1938	
Times on base	5,539	Carl Yastrzemski		406	Jim Rice	1978	
Hit by pitch	86	Kevin Youkilis		35	Don Baylor	1986	
Sacrifice hits	219	Duffy Lewis		54	Jack Barry	1917	
Sacrifice flies	105	Carl Yastrzemski		12	Jackie Jensen; Jackie Jensen; Jimmy Piersall	1955; 1959; 1956	
Intentional walks	243	Ted Williams		33	Ted Williams	1957	
Grounded into double plays	323	Carl Yastrzemski		**36**	Jim Rice	1984	
Caught stealing	123	Tris Speaker		58	Tris Speaker	1912	
Outs made	9,126	Carl Yastrzemski		515	Jim Rice	1984	
At bats per strikeout	40.9	Stuffy McInnis		64.9	Stuffy McInnis	1921	
At bats per home run	14.4	Manny Ramirez		10.3	David Ortiz	2006	

Additionally, the team record for consecutive games played with at least one hit (hitting streak) is held by Dom DiMaggio at 34 games, set during the 1949 season. His streak began with a single on June 29 and ended when he went 0-for-5 on August 9; during that period, DiMaggio also appeared in a game on July 18 only as a pinch runner, which neither counts for or against the hitting streak.

=== Pitching ===
Statistic	Career			Single season			
Statistic	Stat value	Player	Ref.	Stat value	Player	Season	Ref.
Wins	192	Roger Clemens; Cy Young		34	Smoky Joe Wood	1912	
Losses	168	Tim Wakefield		25	Red Ruffing	1928	
Win–loss %	.760 (117–37)	Pedro Martínez		.923 (12–1)	Clay Buchholz	2013	
Saves	219	Jonathan Papelbon		46	Tom Gordon	1998	
Earned run average (ERA)	1.99	Smoky Joe Wood		0.96	Dutch Leonard	1914	
Walks plus hits per inning pitched (WHIP)	.970	Chris Sale; Cy Young		**.737**	Pedro Martínez	2000	
Strikeouts per nine innings pitched	13.214	Chris Sale		13.500	Chris Sale	2018	
Strikeout to walk ratio	6.693	Chris Sale		8.875	Pedro Martínez	2000	
Games pitched	637	Bob Stanley		81	Mike Timlin	2005	
Innings pitched	3,006	Tim Wakefield		384 2/3	Cy Young	1902	
Strikeouts	2,590	Roger Clemens		313	Pedro Martínez	1999	
Games started	430	Tim Wakefield		43	Cy Young	1902	
Games finished	377	Bob Stanley		69	Tom Gordon	1998	
Complete games	275	Cy Young		41	Cy Young	1902	
Shutouts	38	Roger Clemens; Cy Young		10	Smoky Joe Wood; Cy Young	1912; 1904	
Home runs allowed	401	Tim Wakefield		38	Rick Porcello; Tim Wakefield	2017; 1996	
Walks allowed	1,095	Tim Wakefield		134	Mel Parnell	1949	
Hits allowed	2,931	Tim Wakefield		350	Cy Young	1902	
Earned runs allowed	1,480	Tim Wakefield		140	Wes Ferrell	1936	
Wild pitches	125	Tim Wakefield		21	Earl Wilson	1963	
Hit batsmen	176	Tim Wakefield		20	Bronson Arroyo; Howard Ehmke	2004; 1923	
Batters faced	12,971	Tim Wakefield		1,508	Bill Dinneen	1902	
Hits per nine innings pitched	6.754	Chris Sale		5.309	Pedro Martínez	2000	
Walks per nine innings pitched	.986	Cy Young		.687	Cy Young	1904	
Home runs per nine innings pitched	.064	Rube Foster; Ernie Shore; Smoky Joe Wood		.030	Sad Sam Jones; Cy Young	1921; 1908	

=== Fielding ===
This is a partial list of the team's single-season fielding records.

Statistic	Qty.	Player	Season	Ref.
Putouts	1586	Stuffy McInnis	1920	
Assists	528	Rick Burleson	1980	
Double plays turned as SS	**147**	Rick Burleson	1980	

Pos.	Games			Putouts			Assists			Ref.
Pos.	Qty.	Player	Season	Qty.	Player	Season	Qty.	Player	Season	Ref.
C	154	Carlton Fisk	1978	972	Jason Varitek	1999	156	Lou Criger	1903	
1B	**162**	Bill Buckner	1985	1586	Stuffy McInnis	1920	184	Bill Buckner	1985	
2B	160	Dustin Pedroia	2013	443	Bobby Doerr	1950	490	Bobby Doerr	1943	
3B	161	Wade Boggs	1985	203	Jimmy Collins	1901	368	Wade Boggs	1983	
SS	157	Xander Bogaerts	2016	320	Johnny Pesky	1942	528	Rick Burleson	1980	
LF	161	Carl Yastrzemski	1967	339	Jim Rice	1983	30	Duffy Lewis	1910	
CF	157	Tris Speaker	1914	481	Dom DiMaggio	1948	**35**	Tris Speaker	1909; 1912	
RF	161	Dwight Evans	1982; 1984	366	Mookie Betts	2017	27	Harry Hooper	1911	
P	81	Mike Timlin	2005	42	Oil Can Boyd	1985	110	Smoky Joe Wood	1912	

== Team records ==
Note: games behind (GB) applies to non-first-place seasons, while games ahead (GA) applies to first-place seasons. The 2005 Red Sox, who finished in a tie for first in the American League East and were declared the Wild Card team based on head-to-head records, are not included in either category.

Statistic	High		Low	
Statistic	Stat value	Season	Stat value	Season
Games played	163‡	1961 Red Sox; 1978 Red Sox; 1985 Red Sox	60	2020 Red Sox
Wins	108	2018 Red Sox	43†	1932 Red Sox
Losses	111	1932 Red Sox	47†	1903 Americans; 1912 Red Sox
Ties	6	1907 Americans; 1914 Red Sox	0	many times
Win pct.	.691 (105–47)	1912 Red Sox	.279 (43–111)	1932 Red Sox
Games behind (GB)	64	1932 Red Sox	1/2	1972 Red Sox
Games ahead (GA)	+14 1/2	1903 Americans	+1	1988 Red Sox
Runs scored	1,027	1950 Red Sox	463†	1906 Americans
Runs allowed	922	1925 Red Sox	380†	1918 Red Sox
Batters' average age	31.6	1905 Americans	24.9	1911 Red Sox
Pitchers' average age	33.6	2005 Red Sox	24.4	1916 Red Sox
Home attendance	3,062,699	2009 Red Sox	182,150†	1932 Red Sox

† These categories exclude the 2020 team that played a 60-game season; the team won 24 games and lost 36 games (a .400 winning percentage); scored 292 runs and allowed 351 runs; and played without fans in attendance due to the COVID-19 pandemic.

‡ The 1961 and 1985 teams each had a tie game during their 162-game schedule that was subsequently replayed; the 1978 team played a tie-breaker game at the end of their 162-game schedule.

== See also ==
- List of Major League Baseball franchise postseason streaks
- List of Boston Red Sox awards
