= Ed Gallagher (baseball) =

American baseball player (1910–1981)

Edward Michael Gallagher Jr.
- Pitcher
- Born: November 28, 1910; Dorchester, Massachusetts, U.S.
- Died: December 22, 1981 (aged 71); Hyannis, Massachusetts, U.S.
- Batted: Both Threw: Left

MLB debut
- July 8, 1932, for the Boston Red Sox

Last MLB appearance
- September 24, 1932, for the Boston Red Sox

MLB statistics
- Win–loss record: 0-3
- Earned run average: 12.55
- Games: 9
- Stats at Baseball Reference

Teams
- Boston Red Sox (1932)

Edward Michael Gallagher (November 28, 1910 – December 22, 1981) was an American starting pitcher in Major League Baseball who played for the Boston Red Sox during the 1932 season. Listed at 6 ft 2 in (1.88 m), 197 lb., Gallagher was a switch-hitter and threw left-handed.

== Biography ==
A native of Dorchester, Massachusetts, Gallagher attended Boston College High School and graduated from Boston College itself in 1932. A multi-sport athlete at BC, Gallagher not only excelled at baseball but also was a two-way player for the school's football squad. While at Boston College in 1931, he played for the Barnstable town team in the Cape Cod Baseball League and returned to Barnstable to play again in 1933 after his one-year stint in the big leagues.

Upon graduation, Gallagher signed with the Red Sox and posted a 0–3 record with six strikeouts and a 12.55 ERA in 23 2/3 innings of work in the 1932 season. His best outing came on September 17, when he tossed seven innings and allowed just four hits and two earned runs in the Red Sox' 5–0 defeat to the Detroit Tigers at Navin Field. In his final appearance for Boston, Gallagher surrendered a three-run home run to Hall of Famer Lou Gehrig at Fenway Park. An injury to Gallagher's knee in 1933, sustained while pitching batting practice, ended his major league career.

After his baseball career, Gallagher worked as a personal secretary to James Roosevelt, son of President Franklin D. Roosevelt. Gallagher served as the Massachusetts campaign chairman for FDR's 1936 re-election bid and later succeeded his father, Edward Sr., as president of Wonderland Greyhound Park. Gallagher served as president of the Boston College alumni association in 1955 and 1956 and was inducted into the school's Varsity Club Hall of Fame in 1976. Gallagher died in Hyannis, Massachusetts in 1981 at age 71 after a five-year illness.
