= Jason Michaels =

American baseball player (born 1976)

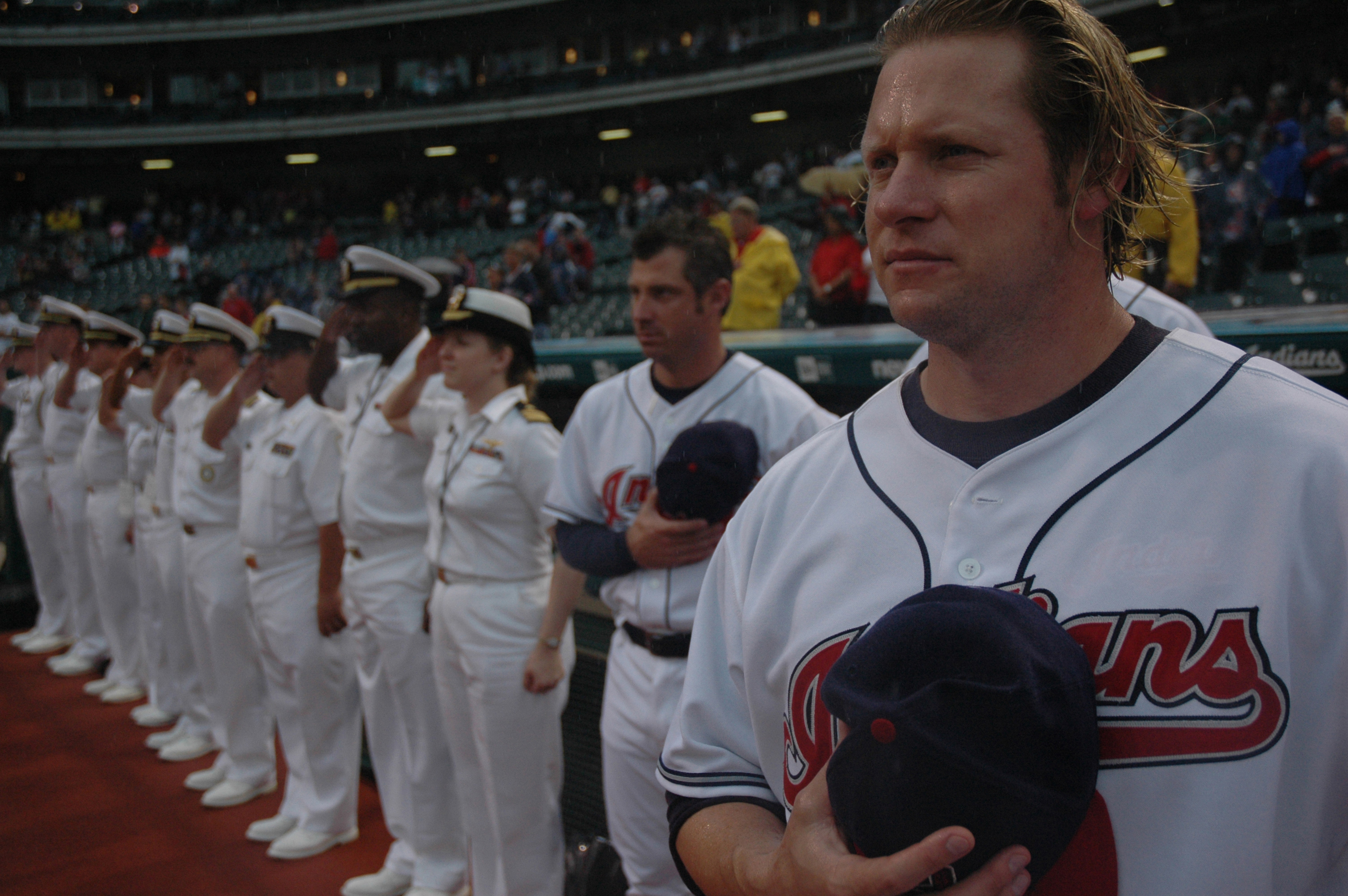
- Michaels with the Cleveland Indians in 2006
- Outfielder
- Born: May 4, 1976 (age 50); Tampa, Florida, U.S.
- Batted: Right Threw: Right

MLB debut
- April 6, 2001, for the Philadelphia Phillies

Last MLB appearance
- September 13, 2011, for the Houston Astros

MLB statistics
- Batting average: .263
- Home runs: 59
- Runs batted in: 299
- Stats at Baseball Reference

Teams
- Philadelphia Phillies (2001–2005); Cleveland Indians (2006–2008); Pittsburgh Pirates (2008); Houston Astros (2009–2011)

Jason Drew Michaels (born May 4, 1976), nicknamed "J-Mike", is an American retired Major League Baseball outfielder. He played for the Philadelphia Phillies, Cleveland Indians, Pittsburgh Pirates, and Houston Astros.

== High school and college ==
Born in Tampa, Florida, Michaels graduated in 1994 from Jesuit High School in Tampa, a school which also produced major leaguers Lou Piniella, Dave Magadan and Brad Radke. He batted over .400 in each of three years for Jesuit, and was selected in the 49th round (1,323rd overall) of the 1994 Major League Baseball draft by the San Diego Padres. He chose not to sign and instead attended Okaloosa-Walton College, a community college in Niceville, Florida. At Okaloosa-Walton, Michaels hit .421 with nine home runs and 45 runs batted in, and was named Panhandle Conference Player of the Year in 1996. He graduated from Okaloosa-Walton in 1996, and that year played collegiate summer baseball for the Orleans Cardinals of the Cape Cod Baseball League.

Michaels was selected in the 44th round (1,314th overall) of the 1996 MLB draft by the Tampa Bay Devil Rays, but he again opted not to sign and instead entered the University of Miami. He lettered in baseball for the Hurricanes in both 1997 and 1998, and was a teammate of future major-leaguers Pat Burrell and Aubrey Huff. In two seasons at Miami, he batted .396 with 34 home runs and 154 runs batted in. In 1997, he set Hurricane single-season records for hits (106), doubles (32) and total bases (189).

The St. Louis Cardinals selected Michaels in the 15th round (464th overall) of the 1997 MLB draft, but once again he opted not to sign, returning to Miami for his final year of eligibility. Upon completing the season, Michaels was drafted for the fourth time when the Philadelphia Phillies selected him in the fourth round (104th overall) of the 1998 MLB draft. He signed his first professional contract on June 19, 1998.

In 2010, Michaels was inducted into the University of Miami Sports Hall of Fame.

== Professional career ==
=== Philadelphia Phillies ===
In the Phillies farm system from 1998 through 2001, Michaels played for the Batavia Muckdogs of the short-season, Single-A New York–Penn League (1998), the Clearwater Phillies (now Clearwater Threshers) of the advanced Single-A Florida State League (1999), the Reading Phillies of the Double-A Eastern League (2000) and the Scranton/Wilkes-Barre Red Barons of the Triple-A International League (2001). In 424 minor league games with the Phillies, he hit .282 with 52 home runs and 264 RBI.

Although he spent most of the season with Scranton/Wilkes-Barre, Michaels made his major league debut with Philadelphia as a pinch hitter on April 6, 2001. He was on the Phillies' 25-man roster from 2002 through 2005 as a reserve outfielder and pinch hitter, compiling a .291 batting average with 21 home runs and 100 RBI in 383 games and 808 at bats. He was used primarily as a pinch hitter and defensive replacement in 2002 and 2003. In 2004, he was the team's fourth outfielder behind fellow University of Miami alumnus Pat Burrell, Marlon Byrd, and Bobby Abreu. In 2005, he platooned in center field with left-handed hitting Kenny Lofton.

=== Cleveland Indians ===
On January 27, 2006, the Phillies traded Michaels to the Cleveland Indians for left-handed relief pitcher Arthur Rhodes. This trade precipitated a second deal in which the Indians sent outfielder Coco Crisp, relief pitcher David Riske and catcher Josh Bard to the Boston Red Sox in exchange for reliever Guillermo Mota, third baseman Andy Marte, catcher Kelly Shoppach, Randy Newsom and cash. Michaels replaced Crisp in left field for the Indians in 2006, hitting primarily in the second spot in the batting order behind Grady Sizemore. For the season, he hit .267 with nine home runs and a career-best 55 RBI in 123 games. He missed 16 games after crashing into the outfield wall at Yankee Stadium on June 15.

On September 6, 2006, the Indians announced that Michaels was their nominee for the prestigious Roberto Clemente Award, given annually to the major league player who best exemplifies a commitment to community service. Michaels donated the $2,500 award to the Cleveland chapter of Gang Resistance Education and Training.

Michaels's struggles against right-handed pitching in 2006 (.253, four home runs, 28 RBI in 338 plate appearances compared to .291, five home runs, 27 RBI in 210 plate appearances against left-handers) prompted the Indians to sign left-handed hitting, free agent outfielder David Dellucci after the 2006 season. Dellucci and Michaels were expected to platoon in left field in 2007, with Michaels seeing most of his playing time against left-handed pitching.

Michaels played in 105 games in 2007, batting .270 with seven home runs and 39 RBI. He saw his first career postseason action in Game 2 of the 2007 American League Division Series against the New York Yankees, hitting a double in his first at bat of the game.

On May 5, 2008, Michaels was designated for assignment. At the time, he was hitting only .207 with 9 RBI in 21 games with Cleveland.

=== Pittsburgh Pirates ===
On May 8, 2008, Michaels was traded to the Pittsburgh Pirates. He batted .228 with eight home runs and 44 RBI in 102 games as a Pirate.

=== Houston Astros ===
On December 15, 2008, Michaels was signed to a one-year, $750,000 contract by the Houston Astros. He spent most of the first half appearing as a pinch hitter, but began to earn more playing time after the All-Star break, hitting .274 in games he started. Michaels ended the season batting .237 with four home runs and 16 RBI in 102 games.

Michaels re-signed with the Astros on a one-year, $800,000 deal with a club option for 2011 on December 14, 2009. Michaels batted .253 with eight home runs and 26 RBI in 106 games during the 2010 season.

On October 4, 2010, the Astros exercised Michaels' $900,000 club option for 2011. He hit just .199 with two home runs and 10 RBI in 89 games.

=== Washington Nationals ===
The Washington Nationals signed Michaels to a minor league contract on December 16, 2011. During spring training, he served as a mentor to Nationals top prospect Bryce Harper. He was released on March 29, and re-signed to another minor league contract on April 2. Michaels spent the entire 2012 season with the Triple-A Syracuse Chiefs, batting .202 with two home runs and 12 RBI in 35 games.

On March 4, 2013, Michaels signed with the Nationals as a player/hitting coach.

== Personal life ==
Michaels's grandfather, John Michaels, pitched for the 1932 Boston Red Sox and also played in the Cincinnati Reds organization. His father, Earl Michaels, played quarterback for the West Virginia Tech football team. His cousin, Jacob Watters, was selected by the Oakland Athletics in the 2022 Major League Baseball draft.

As of 2024, Michaels runs The Big League Approach, a baseball clinic in Tampa, Florida.
