= Urbane Pickering =

American baseball player (1899–1970)

- Third baseman
- Born: June 3, 1899; Hoxie, Kansas, U.S.
- Died: May 13, 1970 (aged 70); Modesto, California, U.S.
- Batted: Right Threw: Right

MLB debut
- April 18, 1931, for the Boston Red Sox

Last MLB appearance
- September 25, 1932, for the Boston Red Sox

MLB statistics
- Batting average: .257
- Home runs: 11
- Runs batted in: 92
- Stats at Baseball Reference

Teams
- Boston Red Sox (1931–1932)

Urbane Henry "Pick" Pickering (June 3, 1899 – May 13, 1970) was an American professional baseball player for the Boston Red Sox.

== Biography ==
Pickering was born on June 3, 1899, in Hoxie, Kansas.

In 1931, Pickering made his Major League debut with the Boston Red Sox, on April 18. Throughout the season, he played 103 games for the team. He played most of his games at third base, although he played some at second base as well.

Pickering played the next year for the Red Sox. This year he played 132 games, being their everyday third baseman (and playing one game at catcher). He had a mediocre season, hitting .260 with 40 runs batted in, although gaining five triples.

Those were the only two seasons Pickering played in the Major Leagues. He served with the U.S. Army during World War II and later became chief of police of Modesto, California from 1945–1952. He died on May 13, 1970, in Modesto, at the age of 70 after a brief illness.
