= Gordon McNaughton =

American baseball player (1910–1942)

- Pitcher
- Born: July 31, 1910; Chicago, Illinois
- Died: August 6, 1942 (aged 32); Chicago, Illinois
- Batted: Right Threw: Right

MLB debut
- August 13, 1932, for the Boston Red Sox

Last MLB appearance
- September 18, 1932, for the Boston Red Sox

MLB statistics
- Win–loss record: 0–1
- Earned run average: 6.43
- Strikeouts: 6

Teams
- Boston Red Sox (1932)

Gordon Joseph McNaughton (July 31, 1910 – August 6, 1942) was a pitcher in Major League Baseball who played briefly for the Boston Red Sox during the 1932 season. Listed at 6 ft 1 in (1.85 m), 190 lb (86 kg), Leheny batted and threw right-handed. A native of Chicago, Illinois, he attended Loyola University Chicago and Xavier University.

In a six-game career, McNaughton posted a 0–1 record with a 6.43 ERA, including two starts, two games finished, 21 hits allowed, six strikeouts, 22 walks, and 21.0 innings of work.

McNaughton died in his hometown of Chicago, Illinois, at age 32 when he was shot in a hotel lobby by an ex-girlfriend.
