= Andy Spognardi =

American baseball player (1908–2000)

- Infielder
- Born: October 18, 1908; Boston, Massachusetts, U.S.
- Died: January 1, 2000 (aged 91); Boston, Massachusetts, U.S.
- Batted: Right Threw: Right

MLB debut
- September 2, 1932, for the Boston Red Sox

Last appearance
- September 25, 1932, for the Boston Red Sox

MLB statistics
- Batting average: .294
- Home runs: 0
- Runs batted in: 1
- Stats at Baseball Reference

Former teams
- Boston Red Sox (1932)

Andrea Ettore Spognardi (October 18, 1908 – January 1, 2000) was an American Major League Baseball infielder who played for the Boston Red Sox during the last month of the 1932 season, in which the Red Sox finished in last place, 54 games behind the league champion New York Yankees. The Boston College athlete had never played in the minor leagues before his first Red Sox appearance, when he substituted in a game they were losing 15-0 in Philadelphia. The 23-year-old rookie was 5 ft 9 1/2 in (1.77 m) tall and weighed 160 lbs.

In 17 games as a second baseman, shortstop and third baseman he handled 52 of 53 chances successfully for a fielding percentage of .981. He hit .294 (10-for-34), and 6 bases on balls raised his on-base percentage up to .400. He scored 9 runs and had 1 run batted in.

Spognardi died in his hometown of Boston, Massachusetts, at the age of 91.
