= Hank Patterson (baseball) =

American baseball player (1907–1970)

Boston Red Sox – No. 11
- Catcher
- Born: July 17, 1907; San Francisco, California
- Died: September 30, 1970 (aged 63); Panorama City, California
- Batted: Right Threw: Right

MLB debut
- September 5, 1932, for the Boston Red Sox

Last appearance
- September 5, 1932, for the Boston Red Sox

MLB statistics (through 1932)
- Games played: 1
- Stats at Baseball Reference

Henry Joseph Colquit Patterson (July 17, 1907 – September 30, 1970) was a catcher in Major League Baseball. Listed at 5 ft 11.5 in (1.82 m), 170 lb., Patterson batted and threw right-handed. He was born in San Francisco.

Little is known about this utility player who put on a Boston Red Sox uniform late in the 1932 season.

On September 5, 1932, Patterson appeared in a game against the Washington Senators at Griffith Stadium. He went hitless in his only at-bat and never appeared in a major league game again.

Patterson died at the age of 63 in Panorama City, California.

== See also ==
- 1932 Boston Red Sox season
- Boston Red Sox all-time roster
- Cup of coffee
