= John Michaels =

American baseball player (1907–1996)

- Pitcher
- Born: July 10, 1907; Bridgeport, Connecticut, U.S.
- Died: November 18, 1996 (aged 89); Sebring, Florida, U.S.
- Batted: Left Threw: Left

MLB debut
- April 16, 1932, for the Boston Red Sox

Last MLB appearance
- September 24, 1932, for the Boston Red Sox

MLB statistics
- Win–loss record: 1–6
- Earned run average: 5.13
- Strikeouts: 16

Teams
- Boston Red Sox (1932)

John Joseph Michaels (July 10, 1907 – November 18, 1996) was an American left-handed pitcher in Major League Baseball. Michaels pitched in 28 games for the Boston Red Sox in 1932, winning one and losing six while striking out sixteen batters.

Michaels was the grandfather of Major League outfielder Jason Michaels.
