= 1981 Houston Astros season =

20th season in Major League Baseball for the Houston Astros

1981 Houston Astros
- National League West co-champions (Note: Division title winners for the second half of the season.)
- League: National League
- Division: West
- Ballpark: Astrodome
- City: Houston, Texas
- Record: 1st half: 28–29 (.491); 2nd half: 33–20 (.623); Overall: 61–49 (.555)
- Divisional place: 1st half: 3rd (8 GB); 2nd half: 1st
- Owners: John McMullen
- General managers: Al Rosen
- Managers: Bill Virdon
- Television: KRIV–TV 26 (Gene Elston, Dewayne Staats, Larry Dierker)
- Radio: KENR–AM 1070 (Gene Elston, Dewayne Staats, Larry Dierker)

The 1981 Houston Astros season was the 20th season for the Major League Baseball (MLB) franchise located in Houston, Texas, their 17th as the Astros, 20th in the National League (NL), 13th in the NL West division, and 17th at The Astrodome. The Astros entered the season as defending NL West division-champions with a 93–70 record for their first-ever division title and playoff appearance, ultimately losing to the Philadelphia Phillies in the 1980 National League Championship Series (NLCS).

On April 9 at Dodger Stadium, Joe Niekro made his first Opening Day start on the road for Houston, who were defeated by the Los Angeles Dodgers, 2–0. The Astros attained a record of 28–29, in third place and 8 games behind Los Angeles in the NL West until a players' strike interrupted the season, later classified as the season's first half. In the amateur draft, Houston's top selection was outfielder Curtis Burke in the third round.

With nearly one-third of the season eventually lost (52 games for Houston), a one-time modified format with a split regular season and a new opening round to the playoffs, the Division Series (DS), was introduced. (Note: The DS initially was intended as an additional round only for the 1981 playoffs, to be discontinued the following year and revert to the previous four-team format that was implemented in 1969. The four-team tournament remained in place until 1995; as part of divisional realignment, MLB permanently re-introduced the DS, with different criteria for qualifying.) Pitchers Bob Knepper (first career selection) and Nolan Ryan (sixth) represented the Astros at the MLB All-Star Game. The Astros acquired second baseman Phil Garner, another All-Star that year, after the event.

On September 26, Ryan pitched the seventh no-hitter in franchise history, a 5–0 victory over the Dodgers. The fifth no-hitter of Ryan's career, this surpassed Sandy Koufax for most in major league history.

Houston won the NL West in the second half with a loss by the Cincinnati Reds on October 3, the penultimate day of the season. With a 33–20 record, the Astros claimed an NL West division title and advanced to the playoffs for the second consecutive season, to the first-ever National League Division Series (NLDS). Here, they faced the Dodgers, the NL West-division winners of the first half of the season. However, the Astros were defeated in five games, ending their season, and the Dodgers became World Series champions.

Ryan led the major leagues in earned run average (1.69 ERA), the first time in his career winning the title. Following the season, Knepper was named The Sporting News NL Comeback Player of the Year, the first Houston Astros to win this award.

== Offseason ==
=== Summary ===
The Houston Astros concluded the 1980 campaign with a record of 93–70 (.571) for the best regular-season record in the National League (NL), and a one-game lead over the runners-up Los Angeles Dodgers in the NL West to become division champions. Hence, the Astros qualified to play in the National League Championship Series (NLCS); however, they lost in five games to the Philadelphia Phillies, the eventual World Series champions. On July 4, 1980, Nolan Ryan became the fourth major league pitcher to amass 3,000 strikeouts. Having won 21 games in 1979 and 20 games in 1980, Joe Niekro became the first Astros hurler to win 20 games more than once.

=== Transactions ===
- October 26, 1980: Hired Al Rosen as team president and general manager.
- December 4, 1980: Don Sutton was signed as a free agent by the Astros.
- December 8, 1980: Chris Bourjos was traded by the San Francisco Giants with Bob Knepper to the Houston Astros for Enos Cabell.
- March 27, 1981: Julio González was released by the Astros.

== Regular season ==
=== Summary ===
==== April ====
Opening Day starting lineup
Uniform	Player	Position
21	Terry Puhl	Right fielder
12	Craig Reynolds	Shortstop
28	César Cedeño	Center fielder
25	José Cruz	Left fielder
18	Art Howe	Third baseman
8	Dave Roberts	First baseman
10	Dickie Thon	Second baseman
6	Luis Pujols	Catcher
36	Joe Niekro	Pitcher
Venue: Dodger Stadium • Final: Los Angeles 2, Houston 0 Sources:

The Astros played Opening Day at Dodger Stadium on April 9, where they were shut out by Los Angeles, 2–0. Both starting pitchers made their first Opening Day starts, with 36-year-old Astros veteran Joe Niekro—who, by winning the 1980 National League West tie-breaker game over the Dodgers, cemented his status as the Astros' first-ever two-time 20-game winner—faced off against 20-year-old southpaw phenom Fernando Valenzuela. The Astros became befuddled by Valenzuela's unusual delivery and screwball—an offering not shown with regularity since Carl Hubbell in the 1930s and 1940s—as Valenzuela went the distance on a five-hitter. Hence, Valenzuela's sensational performance resulted in the birth of "Fernandomania." Only Craig Reynolds (two hits) and Art Howe (one hit and one base on balls) reached base more than once. César Cedeño became the first player to make as many as 10 Opening Day starts for the Astros. (Note: Remained as the record until José Cruz started his 11th Opening Day in 1987.)

The Astros opened the 1981 campaign losing 12 of their first 15 contests.

Right-hander Don Sutton, a key free agent acquisition in the prior off-season, made his Astros debut on April 11 against his former team, the Dodgers. He surrendered six in runs in a 7–4 loss.

On April 28, Sutton earned his first victory in an Astros uniform, after having lost each of his first three starts—two of which were to the Dodgers. This time, he pitched into the ninth inning versus the Atlanta Braves, allowing just two hits and one run in a masterful performance and 2–1 victory, struck out eight and earned a game score of 82. The only blemish was a fifth inning home run by Bob Horner. José Cruz doubled and homered, scoring both of Houston's tallies, while Art Howe sliced three hits. Dave Smith spun a clean ninth to earn his first save.

==== May ====
From May 1 to 24, Art Howe achieved a hitting streak of 23 games, setting a team record that stood for 19 years. During the hitting streak, Howe batted .460, collecting 40 base hits in just 87 at bats. It eclipsed César Cedeño's 22-game effort from August 25 to September 21, 1977, for the club record. Luis Gonzalez tied Howe's club record from May 26 to June 20, 1997, which stood until July 9 to August 28, 2000, when Tony Eusebio connected in 24 straight.

On May 4, José Cruz homered in the same game as—and against—his brother, Héctor, who was playing for the Chicago Cubs. José and Héctor Cruz were the first brother combo to homer in the same contest since Graig and Jim Nettles on September 14, 1974. José lifted off in the first inning, a three-run bomb for a lead that Houston would not relinquish. Héctor went deep off Astros starter Joaquín Andújar during the bottom of the sixth; however, Cruz' shot was the lone run that Andújar (1–1) surrendered to obtain the victory.

Craig Reynolds golfed three triples on May 16 to become just the tenth major leaguer and seventh in the National League since 1950 to do so. On the day, Reynolds accumulated four hits and four RBI to lead a 6–1 decision over the Chicago Cubs. Nolan Ryan (3–1) diffused six hits, three walks, with the run being unearned over seven frames, tallying eight punchouts to pick up the victory. Ryan also singled and scored a run.

On May 24, Art Howe tripled off Vida Blue to extend his hitting streak to 23 games, to set the then-franchise record. However, the San Francisco Giants triumphed over Houston by a narrow margin, 2 to 1. Luis Pujols hit a solo home run to account for Houston's only run.

Howe was recognized with the NL Player of the Month honors for May, succeeding (and again matching) Cedeño as the most recent Astro in September, 1977. During the month, Howe batted .432 /.500 on-base percentage (OBP) /.579 slugging percentage (SLG) / 1.079 on-base plus slugging (OPS). He accumulated 41 hits, 13 walks, 11 RBI, 7 doubles, two triples, and one home run.

==== June ====
With a second base on balls issued on June 5, Nolan Ryan passed Early Wynn for all-time most walks issued in major league history with 1,776. In this game, Ryan also struck out 10 and tossed a 3–0 shutout of the New York Mets.

The Philadelphia Phillies hosted the Astros at Veterans Stadium on June 10, opponents during the previous year's National League Championship Series, featuring a marquee matchup between Nolan Ryan and Steve Carlton. Moreover, Pete Rose stood just two hits away from surpassing St. Louis Cardinals legend Stan Musial for the National League record in hits (3,630). During his first at bat, Rose singled off Ryan to tie Musial for the National League record. This remained the only hit that Ryan surrendered during the first 7 2/3 innings, and Rose's only hit the contest. Moreover, Ryan proceeded to strike Rose out in each of his final three at bats, just the ninth, 10th, and 11th times of the season for Rose. In the top of the seventh, José Cruz homered off Carlton, while Tony Scott followed with a two-run double. In the bottom of the eighth, pinch hitter Luis Aguayo singled up the middle off Ryan, after which, the power pitcher departed. Houston then blew a four-run lead and lost, 5–4, one day prior to the onset of the players' strike. During the strike, Rose remained tied with Musial for fourth-place all-time in hits.

==== MLB All-Star Game ====
Two members of the Astros' starting rotation were selected to the MLB All-Star Game, held on August 9. Nolan Ryan received his first selection as an Astro, sixth overall, and first since 1979 as a member of the California Angels. Knepper made the Midsummer Classic for the first time in his career.

==== August ====
The Astros commenced the second half of the season on August 10, defeating the San Francisco Giants, 6 to 5. Denny Walling's pinch-hit, tie-breaking, two-run double in the top of the ninth keyed Houston's last rally. In the bottom of the ninth with two outs, Joe Pittman bailed out Frank LaCorte when he lunged for, and snared, Larry Herndon's liner with two runners aboard to decide the game.

==== September ====
During a contest at Atlanta–Fulton County Stadium on September 8, César Cedeño leapt into the stands to confront a heckler, grabbing the fan by the shoulders. Cedeño was ejected and fined $5,000. Initially given an indefinite suspension as well by NL president Chub Feeney, the suspension was rescinded after Cedeño called the fan and issued a written apology.

==== Nolan Ryan's no-hitter ====
On September 26, 1981, Ryan no-hit the Dodgers, 5–0, on national television. The 34-year-old right-hander became the first pitcher to throw five career no-hitters, which surpassed former Dodgers great Sandy Koufax, one of the most dominant left-handers in major league history.

During the seventh frame, Terry Puhl's one-handed, running catch of a Mike Scioscia line drive was a key moment that helped preserve the no-hit effort. Ryan struck out 11, yielded just three bases on balls, raised his record to 10–5 and earned a game score of 95.

In the bottom of the third inning, catcher Alan Ashby opened the scoring with a two-run single. Later, during the eighth, Craig Reynolds doubled in Denny Walling, Phil Garner singled in Reynolds, and José Cruz singled home Puhl to make the score 5–0.

When he whiffed Dusty Baker during the sixth inning, it was the tenth hitter Ryan had set down via strikeout, the 135th such game of his career.

Control issues emerged for Ryan in the second inning when he issued a leadoff walk to Steve Garvey. Garvey stole second and advanced to third on a wild pitch. However, he struck out Pedro Guerrero and induced a popup from Ron Roenicke to extinguish the threat. The next inning, Ryan again walked the leadoff hitter, Derrel Thomas, then fanned Ted Power and Davey Lopes. Ken Landreaux also walked, but Ryan retired the side when Baker grounded out to second.

In the final inning, Ryan fanned pinch hitter Reggie Smith for his 11th of the game. Next, Landreaux battered a ground ball to Walling, the first baseman, whom he retired. Ryan closed out his masterpiece by inducing a ground ball from Baker to third baseman Art Howe.

Asbhy, Ryan's batterymate, caught his second of three no-hitters for Houston.

Ryan had been tied with Koufax with four no-hitters since June 1, 1975, as a member of the California Angels, the club with whom he accomplished each of the four. Prior to the contest against the Dodgers, Ryan had pitched seven one-hitters. Ryan's was the first Astros no-hitter since Ken Forsch's on April 7, 1979, and the seventh in club history. Nearly five years later to the day, on September 25, 1986, Mike Scott tossed Houston's eighth no-hitter.

The Astros' win kept them 1 1/2 games ahead of Cincinnati for the second-half division title.

==== October ====
While at bat against Jerry Reuss on October 2, Sutton sustained a patella fracture on contact of a hit by pitch, instantly ending his season. Houston would also lose the game to the Dodgers, 6–1. Entering the contest, Sutton's second-half effort had been a leading factor on the pitching staff and Houston's resurgence, having gone 7–1 W–L and 1.86 earned run average (ERA).

==== Performance overview ====
The Astros' pitching staff led the National League in each of earned run average (2.66 ERA), fewest hits (842), fewest home runs (40), most shutouts (19), (Note: Tied with the Dodgers.) and most strikeouts (610).

Led by Ryan and Knepper, the 1981 Astros pitching staff set an all-time franchise mark in ERA. The Astros' pitching staff had established the club record just year prior (3.10), which had superseded the prior record of 3.13 set in 1971. Although the 1981 season was abbreviated to 110 contests as a result of the work stoppage, this pitching staff tied their 1979 counterpart for most team shutouts in franchise history (19).

Ryan, who posted an ERA of 1.69 for the season, led MLB, succeeding as J. R. Richard the second Astros pitcher to lead the NL, who did so in 1979. Knepper finished as runner-up in the NL in ERA (2.18) to Ryan, while Sutton (2.61) placed ninth. In his 15th major league season, it was the first time Ryan had led the league. Both he and Knepper surpassed left-hander Mike Cuellar for the single-season club record, which he set in 1966 with a 2.22 mark, while Knepper established the club record for ERA in a qualified season among left-handers. (Note: For single seasons, throws LH, qualified for league ERA title, playing for HOU, in the regular season, sorted by ascending earned run average.)

Four members of the Astros' starting rotation each placed within the top 10 of the league for individual shutouts. Knepper ranked second (5), while Sutton and Ryan tied for fourth with 3, and Niekro tied for 10th with two.

Following the season, Ryan was recognized with the Houston Astros' team Most Valuable Player Award (MVP).

Knepper was recognized as The Sporting News NL Comeback Player of the Year, after having rebounded from two subpar years with San Francisco, including an ERA well over 4.00 during both. Knepper produced a breakout campaign in 1978 with the Giants, when he went 17–11, 2.63 ERA, 16 complete games, and an-NL leading six shutouts over 36 games. Knepper was also the first Astros player to receive The Sporting News Comeback Player of the Year Award.

=== Season standings ===
==== National League West ====
NL West
Team	W	L	Pct.	GB	Home	Road
Cincinnati Reds	66	42	.611	—	32‍–‍22	34‍–‍20
Los Angeles Dodgers	63	47	.573	4	33‍–‍23	30‍–‍24
Houston Astros	61	49	.555	6	31‍–‍20	30‍–‍29
San Francisco Giants	56	55	.505	11½	29‍–‍24	27‍–‍31
Atlanta Braves	50	56	.472	15	22‍–‍27	28‍–‍29
San Diego Padres	41	69	.373	26	20‍–‍35	21‍–‍34

NL West First Half Standings	W	L	Pct.	GB
Los Angeles Dodgers	36	21	.632	—
Cincinnati Reds	35	21	.625	1/2
Houston Astros	28	29	.491	8
Atlanta Braves	25	29	.463	9 1/2
San Francisco Giants	27	32	.458	10
San Diego Padres	23	33	.411	12 1/2

NL West Second Half Standings	W	L	Pct.	GB
Houston Astros	33	20	.623	—
Cincinnati Reds	31	21	.596	1 1/2
San Francisco Giants	29	23	.558	3 1/2
Los Angeles Dodgers	27	26	.509	6
Atlanta Braves	25	27	.481	7 1/2
San Diego Padres	18	36	.333	15 1/2

==== Record versus opponents ====
National League

1981 National League record Sources:
Team	ATL	CHC	CIN	HOU	LAD	MON	NYM	PHI	PIT	SD	SF	STL
Atlanta	—	3–2–1	6–5	4–8	7–7	3–7	3–3	4–5	2–3	9–6	5–7	4–3
Chicago	2–3–1	—	1–5	1–6	6–4	4–7	5–8–1	2–10	4–10	3–3	5–5	5–4–1
Cincinnati	5–6	5–1	—	8–4	8–8	5–4	7–3	5–2	4–2	10–2	9–5	0–5
Houston	8–4	6–1	4–8	—	4–8	5–2	6–3	4–6	2–4	11–3	9–6	2–4
Los Angeles	7–7	4–6	8–8	8–4	—	5–2	5–1	3–3	5–1	6–5	7–5	5–5
Montreal	7–3	7–4	4–5	2–5	2–5	—	9–3	7–4	10–3	4–2	2–5	6–9
New York	3–3	8–5–1	3–7	3–6	1–5	3–9	—	7–7	3–6–1	2–5	2–4	6–5
Philadelphia	5-4	10–2	2–5	6–4	3–3	4–7	7–7	—	7–5	4–2	4–3	7–6
Pittsburgh	3–2	10–4	2–4	4–2	1–5	3–10	6–3–1	5–7	—	6–4	3–7	3–8
San Diego	6–9	3–3	2–10	3–11	5–6	2–4	5–2	2–4	4–6	—	6–7	3–7
San Francisco	7–5	5–5	5–9	6–9	5–7	5–2	4–2	3–4	7–3	7–6	—	2–3
St. Louis	3–4	4–5–1	5–0	4–2	5–5	9–6	5–6	6–7	8–3	7–3	3–2	—

=== Notable transactions ===
- April 1, 1981: Chris Bourjos was traded by the Houston Astros with cash to the Baltimore Orioles for Kiko Garcia.
- April 3, 1981: Gary Rajsich was traded by the Astros to the New York Mets for John Csefalvay (minors).
- April 17, 1981: David Clyde was signed as a free agent by the Astros.
- April 20, 1981 - Dave Bergman and Jeffrey Leonard were traded by the Astros to the San Francisco Giants for Mike Ivie.
- June 7, 1981: Joaquín Andújar was traded by the Astros to the St. Louis Cardinals for Tony Scott.
- June 8, 1981: Eric Bullock was drafted by the Houston Astros in the 1st round (20th pick) of the 1981 amateur draft (secondary phase).

=== Roster ===
1981 Houston Astros
Roster
Pitchers: 47 Joaquín Andújar; 39 Bob Knepper; 31 Frank LaCorte; 36 Joe Niekro; 26 Gordie Pladson; 48 Vern Ruhle; 34 Nolan Ryan; 35 Joe Sambito; 27 Billy Smith; 45 Dave Smith; 41 Bobby Sprowl; 20 Don Sutton	Catchers: 14 Alan Ashby; 11 Alan Knicely; 6 Luis Pujols; Infielders: 16 Dave Bergman; 28 César Cedeño; 23 Kiko Garcia; 3 Phil Garner; 24 Danny Heep; 18 Art Howe; 15 Mike Ivie; 17 Rafael Landestoy; 30 Jeffrey Leonard; 1 Bert Peña; 9 Joe Pittman; 12 Craig Reynolds; 8 Dave Roberts; 16 Harry Spilman; 10 Dickie Thon; 29 Denny Walling	Outfielders: 25 José Cruz; 26 Scott Loucks; 21 Terry Puhl; 30 Tony Scott; 38 Tim Tolman; 15,22 Gary Woods	Manager: 7 Bill Virdon; Coaches: 4 Deacon Jones; 43 Don Leppert; 5 Bob Lillis; 2 Mel Wright

== Game log ==
=== Regular season (First half) ===
Legend
	Astros win
	Astros loss
	Postponement
**Bold**	Astros team member

1981 regular season game log (First half): 28–29 (home: 14–14; away: 14–15)
April: 7–12 (home: 4–9; away: 3–3)

#	Date	Time (CT)	Opponent	Score	Win	Loss	Save	Time of Game	Attendance	Record	Box/ Streak
1	April 9	3:05 p.m. CST	@ Dodgers	L 0–2	Valenzuela (1–0)	**Niekro** (0–1)	—	2:17	50,511	0–1	L1
2	April 11	9:05 p.m. CST	@ Dodgers	L 4–7	Hooton (1–0)	**Sutton** (0–1)	—	2:56	51,691	0–2	L2
3	April 12	3:05 p.m. CST	@ Dodgers	L 2–3	Sutcliffe (1–0)	**Ruhle** (0–1)	Howe (1)	2:16	50,734	0–3	L3
4	April 13	7:35 p.m. CST	Braves	L 1–2 (10)	Camp (1–0)	**Sambito** (0–1)	Bradford (1)	2:57	34,961	0–4	L4
5	April 14	7:35 p.m. CST	Braves	**W** 8–2	**Niekro** (1–1)	Walk (0–1)	–	2:38	21,440	1–4	W1
6	April 15	7:35 p.m. CST	Braves	**W** 2–0	**Ryan** (1–0)	Boggs (0–1)	**LaCorte** (1)	2:00	22,365	2–4	W2
7	April 17	7:35 p.m. CST	Pirates	L 3–4	Rhoden (2–0)	**Sutton** (0–2)	Romo (2)	2:28	39,119	2–5	L1
8	April 18	12:50 p.m. CST	Pirates	L 3–6 (11)	Jackson (1–0)	**Smith** (0–1)	–	3:06	29,790	2–6	L2
9	April 19	2:05 p.m. CST	Pirates	L 0–2	Scurry (1–0)	**Niekro** (1–2)	Solomon (1)	2:21	30,394	2–7	L3
10	April 20	7:35 p.m. CST	Dodgers	L 2–5	Hooton (3–0)	**Andújar** (0–1)	Goltz (1)	2:34	21,370	2–8	L4
11	April 21	7:35 p.m. CST	Dodgers	**W** 1–0	**Knepper** (1–0)	Reuss (0–1)	—	1:48	21,904	3–8	W1
12	April 22	6:05 p.m. CST	Dodgers	L 0–1	Valenzuela (4–0)	**Sutton** (0–3)	—	2:24	22,830	3–9	L1
13	April 23	7:35 p.m. CST	Reds	L 4–5 (10)	Price (1–0)	**Smith** (0–2)	Moskau (1)	3:06	23,173	3–10	L2
14	April 24	7:35 p.m. CST	Reds	L 0–3	Pastore (1–0)	**Niekro** (1–3)	–	2:23	27,087	3–11	L3
15	April 25	12:50 p.m. CST	Reds	L 1–2	Berenyi (2–0)	**Ryan** (1–1)	Hume (1)	2:45	19,957	3–12	L4
16	April 26	2:05 p.m. CDT	Reds	**W** 1–0	**Knepper** (2–0)	Soto (1–3)	–	2:21	23,428	4–12	W1
17	April 28	6:35 p.m. CDT	@ Braves	**W** 2–1	**Sutton** (1–3)	Montefusco (1–2)	**Smith** (1)	2:34	8,669	5–12	W2
18	April 29	6:35 p.m. CDT	@ Braves	**W** 5–4	**LaCorte** (1–0)	Camp (2–1)	–	3:18	8,334	6–12	W3
19	April 30	6:35 p.m. CDT	@ Braves	**W** 5–1	**Niekro** (2–3)	Boggs (1–3)	–	2:19	10,006	7–12	W4

May: 17–12 (home: 8–4; away: 9–8)

#	Date	Time (CT)	Opponent	Score	Win	Loss	Save	Time of Game	Attendance	Record	Box/ Streak
20	May 1	6:35 p.m. CDT	@ Pirates	**W** 5–3	**Sambito** (1–1)	Solomon (0–1)	–	3:01	7,012	8–12	W5
21	May 2	6:05 p.m. CDT	@ Pirates	L 4–5 (12)	Solomon (1–1)	**Smith** (0–3)	–	3:56	21,993	8–13	L1
22	May 3	12:35 p.m. CDT	@ Pirates	**W** 3–1	**Sutton** (2–3)	Bibby (1–1)	**Smith** (2)	3:15	10,438	9–13	W1
23	May 4	1:35 p.m. CDT	@ Cubs	**W** 5–4	**Andújar** (1–1)	Krukow (1–2)	**Sambito** (1)	3:02	2,941	10–13	W2
24	May 5	1:35 p.m. CDT	@ Cubs	**W** 4–3	**Smith** (1–3)	Smith (0–2)	–	2:41	2,092	11–13	W3
25	May 6	1:35 p.m. CDT	@ Cubs	L 1–2 (11)	Smith (1–2)	**LaCorte** (1–1)	–	3:27	2,572	11–14	W4
26	May 7	1:35 p.m. CDT	@ Cubs	**W** 6–0	**Knepper** (3–0)	Martz (1–1)	–	2:40	3,112	12–14	L1
27	May 8	6:35 p.m. CDT	@ Reds	L 0–4	Seaver (3–1)	**Sutton** (2–4)	–	2:21	31,961	12–15	L1
28	May 9	1:15 p.m. CDT	@ Reds	L 5–9	Berenyi (3–1)	**Andújar** (1–2)	–	2:38	30,860	12–16	L2
29	May 10	1:35 p.m. CDT	@ Reds	**W** 7–5	**Niekro** (3–3)	Pastore (1–1)	**LaCorte** (2)	2:44	31,903	13–16	W1
30	May 11	6:35 p.m. CDT	@ Reds	**W** 5–0	**Ryan** (2–1)	LaCoss (1–4)	–	2:36	11,795	14–16	W2
31	May 12	7:35 p.m. CDT	Cardinals	L 2–3 (10)	Sutter (1–1)	**Sambito** (1–2)	Kaat (2)	2:26	20,020	13–17	L1
32	May 13	7:35 p.m. CDT	Cardinals	**W** 3–0	**Sutton** (3–4)	Shirley (4–1)	–	2:24	21,705	14–17	W1
33	May 14	7:35 p.m. CDT	Cardinals	L 6–7	Otten (1–0)	**Sambito** (1–3)	Sutter (6)	2:54	20,042	14–18	L1
34	May 15	7:35 p.m. CDT	Cubs	**W** 5–0	**Niekro** (4–3)	Caudill (0–3)	–	2:16	23,718	16–18	W1
35	May 16	7:35 p.m. CDT	Cubs	**W** 6–1	**Ryan** (3–1)	Martz (1–2)	**Sambito** (2)	2:48	43,726	17–18	W2
36	May 17	2:35 p.m. CDT	Cubs	**W** 6–1	**Knepper** (4–0)	Krukow (1–4)	–	2:34	34,068	18–18	W3
37	May 19	7:35 p.m. CDT	@ Cardinals	L 12–15	Kaat (2–0)	**Sprowl** (0–1)	–	3:03	14,585	18–19	L1
38	May 20	7:35 p.m. CDT	@ Cardinals	**W** 4–3 (11)	**Niekro** (5–3)	Sutter (1–2)	**Sambito** (3)	2:47	19,175	19–19	W1
39	May 21	7:35 p.m. CDT	@ Cardinals	L 1–3	Martin (1–0)	**Ryan** (3–2)	–	2:13	19,823	19–20	L1
40	May 22	7:35 p.m. CDT	Giants	L 3–6 (15)	Minton (2–2)	**Andújar** (1–3)	–	4:38	30,377	19–21	L2
41	May 23	7:35 p.m. CDT	Giants	**W** 5–3	**LaCorte** (2–1)	Whitson (1–5)	–	3:09	38,586	20–21	W1
42	May 24	5:00 p.m. CDT	Giants	L 1–2	Blue (4–3)	**Sutton** (3–5)	Minton (9)	2:26	34,922	20–22	L1
43	May 25	7:35 p.m. CDT	Padres	**W** 6–3	**Niekro** (6–3)	Mura (1–7)	**Sambito** (4)	2:41	19,025	21–22	W1
44	May 26	7:35 p.m. CDT	Padres	**W** 1–0	**Ryan** (4–2)	Eichelberger (4–3)	**Sambito** (5)	2:23	17,709	22–22	W2
45	May 27	7:35 p.m. CDT	Padres	**W** 1–0	**Knepper** (5–0)	Welsh (2–3)	–	1:50	21,256	23–22	W3
46	May 29	9:35 p.m. CDT	@ Giants	L 1–3	Blue (5–3)	**Sutton** (3–6)	Holland (2)	2:22	8,397	23–23	L1
47	May 30	3:05 p.m. CDT	@ Giants	**W** 9–8 (14)	**Andújar** (2–3)	Breining (1–1)	**Ruhle** (1)	4:33	8,869	24–23	W1
48	May 31	3:05 p.m. CDT	@ Giants	L 1–6	Griffin (4–3)	**Ryan** (4–3)	Holland (3)	2:34	20,626	24–24	L1

June: 4–5 (home: 2–1; away: 2–4)

#	Date	Time (CT)	Opponent	Score	Win	Loss	Save	Time of Game	Attendance	Record	Box/ Streak
49	June 2	9:05 p.m. CDT	@ Padres	**W** 2–1	**LaCorte** (3–1)	Welsh (2–4)	**Sambito** (6)	2:19	9,671	25–24	W1
50	June 3	9:05 p.m. CDT	@ Padres	**W** 6–1	**Sutton** (4–6)	Wise (2–5)	–	2:25	10,023	26–24	W2
51	June 4	3:05 p.m. CDT	@ Padres	L 5–7	Mura (3–7)	**Niekro** (6–4)	Lucas (8)	2:31	12,403	26–25	L1
52	June 5	7:35 p.m. CDT	Mets	**W** 3–0	**Ryan** (5–3)	Jones (1–6)	–	2:09	28,085	27–25	W1
53	June 6	7:35 p.m. CDT	Mets	**W** 6–2	**Ruhle** (1–1)	Zachry (5–6)	**Smith** (3)	2:17	42,478	28–25	W2
54	June 7	7:35 p.m. CDT	Mets	L 1–3	Scott (3–4)	**Knepper** (5–1)	Allen (6)	2:13	29,873	28–26	L1
55	June 8	7:35 p.m. CDT	@ Phillies	L 3–4	Ruthven (8–3)	**Sutton** (4–7)	McGraw (6)	2:41	31,664	28–27	L2
56	June 9	6:35 p.m. CDT	@ Phillies	L 3–10	Bystrom (4–3)	**Niekro** (6–5)	Reed (5)	2:17	33,978	28–28	L3
57	June 10	6:35 p.m. CDT	@ Phillies	L 4–5	Carlton (9–1)	**LaCorte** (3–2)	McGraw (7)	2:22	57,386	28–29	L4

=== Regular season (games canceled by the 1981 Major League Baseball strike) ===
Legend
	Canceled (Strike)
**Bold**	Astros team member

1981 regular season game log
June

#	Date	Time (CT)	Opponent	Score	Win	Loss	Save	Time of Game	Attendance	Record	Box/ Streak
–	June 12		@ Mets	Canceled (Strike)							
–	June 13		@ Mets	Canceled (Strike)							
–	June 14		@ Mets	Canceled (Strike)							
–	June 15		@ Expos	Canceled (Strike)							
–	June 16		@ Expos	Canceled (Strike)							
–	June 17		Phillies	Canceled (Strike)							
–	June 18		Phillies	Canceled (Strike)							
–	June 19		Expos	Canceled (Strike)							
–	June 20		Expos	Canceled (Strike)							
–	June 21		Expos	Canceled (Strike)							
–	June 23		@ Pirates	Canceled (Strike)							
–	June 24		@ Pirates	Canceled (Strike)							
–	June 25		@ Pirates	Canceled (Strike)							
—	June 26	7:35 p.m. CDT	Dodgers	Canceled (Strike)							
—	June 27	7:35 p.m. CDT	Dodgers	Canceled (Strike)							
—	June 28	5:00 p.m. CDT	Dodgers	Canceled (Strike)							
–	June 29		Reds	Canceled (Strike)							
–	June 30		Reds	Canceled (Strike)							

July

#	Date	Time (CT)	Opponent	Score	Win	Loss	Save	Time of Game	Attendance	Record	Box/ Streak
–	July 1		Reds	**Canceled (Strike)**							
–	July 3		@ Braves	**Canceled (Strike)**							
–	July 4		@ Braves	**Canceled (Strike)**							
–	July 5		@ Braves	**Canceled (Strike)**							
—	July 7	9:30 p.m. CDT	@ Dodgers	**Canceled (Strike)**							
—	July 8	9:30 p.m. CDT	@ Dodgers	**Canceled (Strike)** (Makeup date: May 17)							
—	July 9	3:05 p.m. CDT	@ Dodgers	**Canceled (Strike)**							
–	July 10		Braves	**Canceled (Strike)**							
–	July 11		Braves	**Canceled (Strike)**							
–	July 12		Braves	**Canceled (Strike)**							
–	July 16		@ Reds	**Canceled (Strike)**							
–	July 17		@ Reds	**Canceled (Strike)**							
–	July 18		@ Reds	**Canceled (Strike)**							
–	July 19		@ Cubs	**Canceled (Strike)**							
–	July 20		@ Cubs	**Canceled (Strike)**							
–	July 21		Pirates	**Canceled (Strike)**							
–	July 22		Pirates	**Canceled (Strike)**							
–	July 23		Pirates	**Canceled (Strike)**							
–	July 24		Cardinals	**Canceled (Strike)**							
–	July 25		Cardinals	**Canceled (Strike)**							
–	July 26		Cardinals	**Canceled (Strike)**							
–	July 27		Cubs	**Canceled (Strike)**							
–	July 28		Cubs	**Canceled (Strike)**							
–	July 29		Cubs	**Canceled (Strike)**							
–	July 31		@ Cardinals	**Canceled (Strike)**							

August

#	Date	Time (CT)	Opponent	Score	Win	Loss	Save	Time of Game	Attendance	Record	Box/ Streak
–	August 1		@ Cardinals	Canceled (Strike)							
–	August 2		@ Cardinals	Canceled (Strike)							
–	August 3		Giants	Canceled (Strike)							
–	August 4		Giants	Canceled (Strike)							
–	August 5		Giants	Canceled (Strike)							
–	August 7		Padres	Canceled (Strike)							
–	August 8		Padres	Canceled (Strike)							
–	August 9		Padres	Canceled (Strike)							

=== Regular season (Second half) ===
Legend
	Astros win
	Astros loss
	Postponement
	Clinched division
**Bold**	Astros team member

1981 regular season game log (Second half): 33–20 (home: 17–6; away: 16–14)
August: 13–8 (home: 7–1; away: 6–7)

#	Date	Time (CT)	Opponent	Score	Win	Loss	Save	Time of Game	Attendance	Record	Box/ Streak
—	August 9	7:15 p.m. CDT	**52nd All-Star Game in Cleveland, OH**								
1 (58)	August 10	9:35 p.m. CDT	@ Giants	**W** 6–5	**Sambito** (2–3)	Breining (2–2)	**LaCorte** (3)	3:08	11,115	1–0 (29–29)	W1
2 (59)	August 11	9:35 p.m. CDT	@ Giants	L 2–3	Griffin (5–5)	**Niekro** (6–6)	Minton (10)	2:36	12,354	1–1 (29–30)	L1
3 (60)	August 12	2:05 p.m. CDT	@ Giants	**W** 5–4	**Sambito** (3–3)	Holland (3–3)	**Smith** (1)	2:51	8,707	2–1 (30–30)	W1
4 (61)	August 13	3:05 p.m. CDT	@ Padres	L 1–9	Welsh (4–4)	**Knepper** (5–2)	–	2:29	4,899	2–2 (30–31)	L1
5 (62)	August 14	9:05 p.m. CDT	@ Padres	**W** 5–1	**Ryan** (6–3)	Lollar (1–5)	–	2:24	8,414	3–2 (31–31)	W1
6 (63)	August 15	9:05 p.m. CDT	@ Padres	**W** 5–0	**Sutton** (5–7)	Eichelberger (6–4)	–	1:59	5,852	4–2 (32–31)	W2
7 (64)	August 16	3:05 p.m. CDT	@ Padres	**W** 3–0	**Niekro** (7–6)	Mura (4–9)	**Smith** (4)	2:16	5,880	5–2 (33–31)	W3
8 (65)	August 17	7:35 p.m. CDT	Expos	L 2–6	Burris (5–5)	**Ruhle** (1–2)	Fryman (4)	2:19	24,203	5–3 (33–32)	L1
9 {66)	August 18	7:35 p.m. CDT	Expos	**W** 4–2	**Knepper** (6–2)	Rogers (8–5)	**Sambito** (7)	2:04	23,306	6–3 (34–32)	W1
10 (67)	August 19	7:35 p.m. CDT	Expos	**W** 9–1	**Ryan** (7–3)	Sanderson (6–4)	**Smith** (5)	2:39	27,169	7–3 (35–32)	W2
11 (68)	August 21	7:05 p.m. CDT	@ Phillies	L 4–5	Lyle (6–2)	**Ruhle** (1–3)	McGraw (8)	2:41	31,693	7–4 (35–33)	L1
12 (69)	August 22	1:15 p.m. CDT	@ Phillies	L 4–8	Ruthven (9–5)	**Niekro** (7–7)	–	2:16	35,199	7–5 (35–34)	L2
13 (70)	August 23	6:05 p.m. CDT	@ Phillies	L 0–6	Carlton (10–3)	**Knepper** (6–3)	–	1:51	30,630	7–6 (35–35)	L3
14 (71)	August 25	7:05 p.m. CDT	@ Mets	L 1–2	Marshall (1–0)	**Sambito** (3–4)	–	2:32	15,622	7–7 (35–36)	L4
15 (72)	August 26	7:05 p.m. CDT	@ Mets	**W** 9–3	**Sutton** (6–7)	Zachry (6–9)	–	2:34	16,731	8–7 (36–36)	W1
16 (73)	August 27	1:05 p.m. CDT	@ Mets	L 2–3	Marshall (2–0)	**Sambito** (3–5)	Allen (12)	2:28	17,488	8–8 (36–37)	L1
17 (74)	August 28	7:35 p.m. CDT	Phillies	**W** 3–2 (10)	**Smith** (2–3)	Lyle (6–3)	–	2:37	29,482	9–8 (37–37)	W1
18 (75)	August 29 (1)	5:35 p.m. CDT	Phillies	**W** 6–1	**Ruhle** (2–3)	Davis (0–2)	–	2:22	N/A	10–8 (38–37)	W2
19 (76)	August 29 (2)	8:32 p.m. CDT	Phillies	**W** 2–1	**Smith** (1–0)	Noles (0–1)	**LaCorte** (4)	2:01	33,327	11–8 (39–37)	W3
20 (77)	August 30	7:35 p.m. CDT	Phillies	**W** 5–4 (10)	**Smith** (3–3)	Lyle (6–4)	–	2:53	23,102	12–8 (40–37)	W4
21 (78)	August 31	7:35 p.m. CDT	Mets	**W** 6–1	**Sutton** (7–7)	Zachry (6–10)	–	2:27	10,669	13–8 (41–37)	W5

September: 18–10 (home: 10–5; away: 8–5)

#	Date	Time (CT)	Opponent	Score	Win	Loss	Save	Time of Game	Attendance	Record	Box/ Streak
22 (79)	September 1	7:35 p.m. CDT	Mets	**W** 3–2	**Sambito** (4–5)	Marshall (2–1)	–	2:39	16,339	14–8 (42–37)	W6
23 (80)	September 2	7:35 p.m. CDT	Mets	**W** 8–0	**Knepper** (7–3)	Scott (4–8)	–	2:21	18,938	15–8 (43–37)	W7
24 {81)	September 3	6:35 p.m. CDT	@ Expos	**W** 2–1	**Ruhle** (3–3)	Sanderson (7–5)	**Smith** (6)	2:20	24,833	16–8 (44–37)	W8
25 (82)	September 4	6:35 p.m. CDT	@ Expos	**W** 5–0	**Ryan** (8–3)	Gullickson (4–7)	**Sambito** (8)	2:54	32,580	17–8 (45–37)	W9
26 (83)	September 5	1:15 p.m. CDT	@ Expos	L 2–5	Burris (7–5)	**Sutton** (7–8)	–	2:13	30,471	17–9 (45–38)	L1
27 (84)	September 6	12:35 p.m. CDT	@ Expos	**W** 4–3 (12)	**LaCorte** (4–2)	Sosa (1–2)	–	3:33	47,193	18–9 (46–38)	W1
28 (85)	September 7	6:35 p.m. CDT	@ Braves	**W** 3–2	**Smith** (4–3)	Camp (7–2)	**Sambito** (9)	2:40	7,358	19–9 (47–38)	W2
29 (86)	September 8	6:35 p.m. CDT	@ Braves	L 2–3	Camp (8–2)	**Smith** (1–1)	–	2:13	2,800	19–10 (47–39)	L1
30 (87)	September 9	6:35 p.m. CDT	@ Braves	L 0–9	Niekro (7–5)	**Ryan** (8–4)	–	2:34	4,482	19–11 (47–40)	L2
31 (88)	September 11	7:35 p.m. CDT	Giants	**W** 6–0	**Sutton** (8–8)	Blue (8–6)	–	2:30	23,677	20–11 (48–40)	W1
32 (89)	September 12	7:35 p.m. CDT	Giants	**W** 5–2	**Niekro** (8–7)	Whitson (5–8)	**Smith** (7)	2:39	35,867	21–11 (49–40)	W2
33 (90)	September 13	5:00 p.m. CDT	Giants	**W** 3–0	**Knepper** (8–3)	Alexander (8–7)	**LaCorte** (5)	2:32	19,642	22–11 (50–40)	W3
34 (91)	September 14	7:35 p.m. CDT	Reds	L 2–4	Berenyi (8–5)	**Ruhle** (3–4)	–	2:30	19,742	22–12 (50–41)	L1
35 (92)	September 15	5:00 p.m. CDT	Reds	L 0–4	Leibrandt (1–0)	**Ryan** (8–5)	–	2:26	16,354	22–13 (50–42)	L2
36 (93)	September 16	9:05 p.m. CDT	@ Padres	**W** 5–2	**Sutton** (9–8)	Lollar (1–8)	**Sambito** (10)	2:35	4,241	23–13 (51–42)	W1
37 (94)	September 17	9:05 p.m. CDT	@ Padres	**W** 9–0	**Niekro** (9–7)	Mura (5–13)	–	2:14	2,428	24–13 (52–42)	W2
38 (95)	September 18	9:35 p.m. CDT	@ Giants	L 2–5	Alexander (9–7)	**Knepper** (8–4)	Holland (7)	2:26	8,183	24–14 (52–43)	L1
39 (96)	September 19	3:05 p.m. CDT	@ Giants	**W** 8–1	**Ruhle** (4–4)	Griffin (8–7)	–	2:26	11,522	25–14 (53–43)	W1
40 (97)	September 20	3:05 p.m. CDT	@ Giants	**W** 7–3	**Ryan** (9–5)	Lavelle (0–6)	–	3:04	16,824	26–14 (54–43)	W2
41 (98)	September 22	7:35 p.m. CDT	Braves	**W** 3–0	**Sutton** (10–8)	Perry (7–8)	–	2:16	22,564	27–14 (55–43)	W3
42 (99)	September 23	7:35 p.m. CDT	Braves	L 1–3	Mahler (6–6)	**Niekro** (9–8)	–	2:13	24,142	27–15 (55–44)	L1
43 (100)	September 24	7:35 p.m. CDT	Braves	**W** 5–3	**Knepper** (9–4)	McWilliams (1–1)	**Smith** (8)	2:17	23,341	28–15 (56–44)	W1
44 (101)	September 25	7:35 p.m. CDT	Dodgers	L 0–3	Hooton (11–6)	**Ruhle** (4–5)	—	2:18	35,481	28–16 (56–45)	L1
45 (102)	September 26	1:20 p.m. CDT	Dodgers	**W** 5–0	**Ryan** (10–5)	Power (1–3)	—	2:46	32,115	29–16 (57–45)	W1
46 (103)	September 27	5:05 p.m. CDT	Dodgers	**W** 4–1	**Sutton** (11–8)	Valenzuela (13–6)	—	2:23	41,686	30–16 (58–45)	W2
47 (104)	September 28	7:35 p.m. CDT	Padres	**W** 2–1	**Sambito** (5–5)	Eichelberger (8–8)	–	2:07	21,576	31–16 (59–45)	W3
48 (105)	September 29	7:35 p.m. CDT	Padres	L 1–2	Wise (4–8)	**Knepper** (9–5)	Lucas (12)	2:19	34,732	31–17 (59–46)	L1
49 (106)	September 30	6:35 p.m. CDT	@ Reds	L 2–3	Soto (11–9)	**Ruhle** (4–6)	Hume (13)	2:14	24,394	31–18 (59–47)	L2

October: 2–2 (home: 0–0; away: 2–2)

#	Date	Time (CT)	Opponent	Score	Win	Loss	Save	Time of Game	Attendance	Record	Box/ Streak
50 (107)	October 1	4:00 p.m. CDT	@ Reds	**W** 8–1	**Ryan** (11–5)	Berenyi (9–6)	–	3:12	26,484	32–18 (60–47)	W1
51 (108)	October 2	9:30 p.m. CDT	@ Dodgers	L 1–6	Reuss (10–4)	**Sutton** (11–9)	—	2:30	46,108	32–19 (60–48)	L1
52 (109)	October 3	2:50 p.m. CDT	@ Dodgers	L 2–7	Welch (9–5)	**Niekro** (9–9)	—	2:43	42,272	32–20 (60–49)	L2
53 (110)	October 4	3:00 p.m. CDT	@ Dodgers	**W** 5–3	**Smith** (5–2)	Goltz (2–7)	—	3:17	47,072	33–20 (61–49)	W1

=== Detailed records ===
National League
Opponent	W	L	WP	RS	RA
NL East
Chicago Cubs	6	1	0.857	33	11
Montreal Expos	5	2	0.714	28	18
New York Mets	6	3	0.667	39	16
Philadelphia Phillies	4	6	0.400	34	46
Pittsburgh Pirates	2	4	0.333	18	21
St. Louis Cardinals	2	4	0.333	28	31
Div Total	25	20	0.556	180	143
NL West
Atlanta Braves	8	4	0.667	37	30
Cincinnati Reds	4	8	0.333	35	42
**Houston Astros**					
Los Angeles Dodgers	4	8	0.333	26	38
San Diego Padres	11	3	0.786	52	27
San Francisco Giants	9	6	0.600	64	51
Div Total	36	29	0.554	214	188
Season Total	61	49	0.555	394	331

Month	Games	Won	Lost	Win %	RS	RA
April	19	7	12	0.368	44	50
May	29	17	12	0.586	118	100
June	9	4	5	0.444	33	33
August	21	13	8	0.619	84	67
September	28	18	10	0.643	99	64
October	4	2	2	0.500	16	17
Total	110	61	49	0.555	394	331

	Games	Won	Lost	Win %	RS	RA
Home	51	31	20	0.608	166	106
Away	59	30	29	0.508	228	225
Total	110	61	49	0.555	394	331

=== Postseason Game log ===
Legend
	Astros win
	Astros loss
**Bold**	Astros team member

1981 Postseason game log: 2–3 (home: 2–0; away: 0–3)
NL Western Division Series: vs. Los Angeles Dodgers 2–3 (home: 2–0; away: 0–3)

#	Date	Time (CT)	Opponent	Score	Win	Loss	Save	Time of Game	Attendance	Series	Box/ Streak
1	October 6	7:15 p.m. CDT	Dodgers	**W** 3–1	**Ryan** (1–0)	Stewart (0–1)	—	2:22	44,836	HOU 1–0	W1
2	October 7	12:05 p.m. CDT	Dodgers	**W** 1–0 (11)	**Sambito** (1–0)	Stewart (0–2)	—	3:39	42,398	HOU 2–0	W2
3	October 9	3:05 p.m. CDT	@ Dodgers	L 1–6	Hooton (1–0)	**Knepper** (0–1)	—	2:35	46,820	HOU 2–1	L1
4	October 10	7:15 p.m. CDT	@ Dodgers	L 1–2	Valenzuela (1–0)	**Ruhle** (0–1)	—	2:00	55,983	Tied 2–2	L2
5	October 11	3:05 p.m. CDT	Dodgers	L 0–4	Reuss (1–0)	**Ryan** (1–1)	—	2:52	55,979	LAN 3–2	L3

Legend: = Win = Loss = Postponement
Bold = Astros team member

== Major League Baseball draft ==
Houston Astros 1981 MLB draft selections

- Round 1: (Note: First round pick was forfeited to the Texas Rangers as compensation for signing third baseman Dave Roberts in free agency.)
- Round 3 – no. 75: Curtis Burks – OF • Tennessee State University, Nashville, Tennessee • Signed • Career

== Player statistics ==
Table legend
League leader (Bold: MLB leader)	Team leader	*	Left-handed batter or pitcher
League top ten	Leader in appearances at position	#	Switch hitter

=== Batting ===
Abbreviations key

- ⌖ — primary position
- G — games played
- PA — plate appearances
- AB — at bats
- R — Runs
- H — hits
- 2B — doubles
- HR — home runs
- RBI — runs batted in
- BB — base on balls
- SB — stolen bases
- TB — total bases
- AVG — batting average
- OBP — on-base percentage
- SLG — slugging percentage
- OPS — on-base plus slugging

==== Starters by position ====
Regular season batting results
⌖	Player	G	AB	H	2B	3B	HR	RBI	AVG
C	Alan Ashby^{#}	83	255	69	13	0	4	33	.271
1B	César Cedeño	82	306	83	19	0	5	34	.271
2B	Joe Pittman	52	135	38	4	2	0	7	.281
SS	Craig Reynolds*	87	323	84	10	**12**	4	31	.260
3B	Art Howe	103	361	107	22	4	3	36	.296
LF	José Cruz*	107	409	109	16	5	13	55	.267
CF	Tony Scott	55	225	66	13	2	2	22	.293
RF	Terry Puhl*	96	350	88	19	4	3	28	.251

==== Other batters ====
Regular season batting results
Player	G	AB	H	AVG	HR	RBI
Denny Walling	65	158	37	.234	5	23
Kiko Garcia	48	136	37	.272	0	15
Luis Pujols	40	117	28	.239	1	14
Phil Garner	31	113	27	.239	0	6
Gary Woods	54	110	23	.209	0	12
Danny Heep	33	96	24	.250	0	11
Dickie Thon	49	95	26	.274	0	3
Rafael Landestoy	35	74	11	.149	0	4
Dave Roberts	27	54	13	.241	1	5
Mike Ivie	19	42	10	.238	0	6
Harry Spilman	28	34	10	.294	0	1
Jeffrey Leonard	7	18	3	.167	0	3
Tim Tolman	4	8	1	.125	0	0
Scott Loucks	10	7	4	.571	0	0
Alan Knicely	3	7	4	.571	2	2
Dave Bergman	6	6	1	.167	1	1
Bert Peña	4	2	1	.500	0	0

=== Pitching ===
Abbreviations key

- W — wins
- L — losses
- ERA — earned run average
- G — games pitched
- GS — games started
- CG — complete games
- ShO — shutouts
- SV — saves
- IP — innings pitched
- SO — strikeouts
- WHIP — walks plus hits per inning pitched

==== Starting pitchers ====
Regular season pitching results
Player	W	L	ERA	G	GS	CG	ShO	IP	SO	WHIP
Joe Niekro	9	9	2.82	24	24	5	2	166.0	77	1.187
Don Sutton	11	9	2.61	23	23	6	3	158.2	104	1.015
Bob Knepper*	9	5	2.18	22	22	6	5	156.2	75	1.060
Nolan Ryan	11	5	**1.69**	21	21	5	3	149.0	140	1.121
Vern Ruhle	4	6	2.91	20	15	1	0	102.0	39	1.147

==== Other pitchers ====
Regular season pitching results
Player	G	IP	W	L	ERA	SO
Joaquín Andújar	9	23.2	2	3	4.94	18

==== Relief pitchers ====
Regular season pitching results
Player	G	IP	W	L	SV	ERA	SO
Joe Sambito*	49	63.2	5	5	10	1.84	41
Dave Smith	42	75.0	5	3	8	2.76	52
Frank LaCorte	37	42.0	4	2	5	3.64	40
Bobby Sprowl*	15	28.2	0	1	0	5.97	18
Billy Smith	10	20.2	1	1	1	3.05	3
Gordie Pladson	2	4.0	0	0	0	9.00	3

== 1981 National League Division Series ==
Los Angeles Dodgers vs. Houston Astros

Los Angeles wins series, 3-2.

Game	Score	Date
1	Houston 3, Los Angeles 1	October 6
2	Houston 1, Los Angeles 0 (11 innings)	October 7
3	Los Angeles 6, Houston 1	October 9
4	Los Angeles 2, Houston 1	October 10
5	Los Angeles 4, Houston 0	October 11

== Awards and achievements ==
=== No-hit game ===
Date	Pitcher	IP	BB	BR	K	BF	Catcher	Final	Opponent	Venue	Plate umpire	Box
September 26, 1981	Nolan Ryan	9	3	3	11	30	Alan Ashby	5–0	Los Angeles Dodgers	Astrodome	Bruce Froemming	
September 26, 1981	Ryan: Game score: 95 • Win (10–5)											

=== Awards ===
1981 Houston Astros award winners
Name of award		Recipient	Ref.
Houston Astros Most Valuable Player Award (MVP)		Nolan Ryan	
MLB All-Star Game	Reserve pitcher	Bob Knepper	
MLB All-Star Game	Reserve pitcher	Nolan Ryan	
National League (NL) Player of the Month	May	Art Howe	
National League (NL) Player of the Week	April 26	Bob Knepper	
National League (NL) Player of the Week	September 27	Nolan Ryan	
The Sporting News NL Comeback Player of the Year		Bob Knepper	

Other awards results

Name of award	Voting recipient(s) (Team)	Ref.
NL Cy Young	1st—Valenzuela (LAD) • 4th—Ryan (HOU)	
NL Most Valuable Player	1st—Schmidt (PHI) • 14th—Cruz (HOU); Other Astros: 16th—Ryan • 18th—Howe	

=== League leaders ===
Individual batting leaders

- Triples: Craig Reynolds (12)

Individual pitching leaders

- Earned run average: Nolan Ryan (1.69)
- Walks plus hits per inning pitched (WHIP): Don Sutton (1.015)

1981 grand slams
No.	Date	Astros batter	Venue	Inning	Pitcher	Opposing team	Box
None

== Minor league system ==
Level	Team	League	Manager
AAA	Tucson Toros	Pacific Coast League	Jimmy Johnson
AA	Columbus Astros	Southern League	Matt Galante
A	Daytona Beach Astros	Florida State League	Carlos Alfonso
Rookie	GCL Astros Blue	Gulf Coast League	Eric Swanson
Rookie	GCL Astros Orange	Gulf Coast League	Lyle Olsen

Championships

- Florida State League champions: Daytona Beach

== See also ==
- List of Major League Baseball annual ERA leaders
- List of Major League Baseball annual triples leaders
- List of Major League Baseball individual streaks
- List of Major League Baseball career bases on balls allowed leaders
- List of Major League Baseball no-hitters
