= 1982 Pittsburgh Pirates season =

1982 Pittsburgh Pirates
- League: National League
- Division: East
- Ballpark: Three Rivers Stadium
- City: Pittsburgh, Pennsylvania
- Record: 84–78 (.519)
- Divisional place: 4th
- Owners: John W. Galbreath (majority shareholder); Thomas P. Johnson (minority shareholder)
- General managers: Harding "Pete" Peterson
- Managers: Chuck Tanner
- Television: KDKA-TV; Lanny Frattare, Jim Rooker, John Sanders; ASN; Bob Prince, Steve Blass, Dave Giusti
- Radio: KDKA; Lanny Frattare, Jim Rooker

The 1982 Pittsburgh Pirates season was the 101st season of the Pittsburgh Pirates franchise; their 96th in the National League. This was their 13th season at Three Rivers Stadium. The Pirates finished fourth in the National League East with a record of 84–78, eight games behind the eventual NL and World Series champion St. Louis Cardinals.

== Regular season ==
=== Season standings ===
NL East
| Team | W | L | Pct. | GB | Home | Road |
|---|---|---|---|---|---|---|
| St. Louis Cardinals | 92 | 70 | .568 | — | 46‍–‍35 | 46‍–‍35 |
| Philadelphia Phillies | 89 | 73 | .549 | 3 | 51‍–‍30 | 38‍–‍43 |
| Montreal Expos | 86 | 76 | .531 | 6 | 40‍–‍41 | 46‍–‍35 |
| Pittsburgh Pirates | 84 | 78 | .519 | 8 | 42‍–‍39 | 42‍–‍39 |
| Chicago Cubs | 73 | 89 | .451 | 19 | 38‍–‍43 | 35‍–‍46 |
| New York Mets | 65 | 97 | .401 | 27 | 33‍–‍48 | 32‍–‍49 |

=== Record vs. opponents ===
1982 National League record Sources:
| Team | ATL | CHC | CIN | HOU | LAD | MON | NYM | PHI | PIT | SD | SF | STL |
|---|---|---|---|---|---|---|---|---|---|---|---|---|
| Atlanta | — | 8–4 | 14–4 | 10–8 | 7–11 | 5–7 | 9–3 | 6–6 | 4–8 | 11–7 | 8–10 | 7–5 |
| Chicago | 4–8 | — | 6–6 | 9–3 | 5–7 | 6–12 | 9–9 | 9–9 | 9–9 | 4–8 | 6–6 | 6–12 |
| Cincinnati | 4–14 | 6–6 | — | 7–11 | 7–11 | 4–8 | 7–5 | 5–7 | 4–8 | 6–12 | 6–12 | 5–7 |
| Houston | 8–10 | 3–9 | 11–7 | — | 7–11 | 4–8 | 8–4 | 7–5 | 9–3 | 9–9 | 5–13 | 6–6 |
| Los Angeles | 11–7 | 7–5 | 11–7 | 11–7 | — | 8–4 | 6–6 | 4–8 | 5–7 | 9–9 | 9–9 | 7–5 |
| Montreal | 7–5 | 12–6 | 8–4 | 8–4 | 4–8 | — | 11–7 | 8–10 | 7–11 | 7–5 | 4–8 | 10–8 |
| New York | 3–9 | 9–9 | 5–7 | 4–8 | 6–6 | 7–11 | — | 7–11 | 8–10 | 6–6 | 4–8 | 6–12 |
| Philadelphia | 6-6 | 9–9 | 7–5 | 5–7 | 8–4 | 10–8 | 11–7 | — | 9–9 | 7–5 | 10–2 | 7–11 |
| Pittsburgh | 8–4 | 9–9 | 8–4 | 3–9 | 7–5 | 11–7 | 10–8 | 9–9 | — | 6–6 | 6–6 | 7–11 |
| San Diego | 7–11 | 8–4 | 12–6 | 9–9 | 9–9 | 5–7 | 6–6 | 5–7 | 6–6 | — | 10–8 | 4–8 |
| San Francisco | 10–8 | 6–6 | 12–6 | 13–5 | 9–9 | 8–4 | 8–4 | 2–10 | 6–6 | 8–10 | — | 5–7 |
| St. Louis | 5–7 | 12–6 | 7–5 | 6–6 | 5–7 | 8–10 | 12–6 | 11–7 | 11–7 | 8–4 | 7–5 | — |

=== Game log ===
1982 Game Log: 84–78 (Home: 42–39; Away: 42–39)
April: 8–10 (Home: 2–5; Away: 6–5)

| # | Date | Opponent | Score | Win | Loss | Save | Attendance | Record |
|---|---|---|---|---|---|---|---|---|
| 1 | April 10 | @ Cardinals | 11–7 | **Scurry** (1–0) | Littell | **Candelaria** (1) | 40,878 | 1–0 |
| 2 | April 11 | @ Cardinals | 6–7 | Kaat | **Romo** (0–1) | — | 14,819 | 1–1 |
| 3 | April 12 | @ Cardinals | 4–5 | Martin | **Griffin** (0–1) | Sutter | 18,066 | 1–2 |
| 4 | April 14 | @ Expos | 4–5 | Sanderson | **Solomon** (0–1) | Fryman | 35,941 | 1–3 |
| 5 | April 15 | @ Expos | 4–3 | **Tekulve** (1–0) | Rogers | **Scurry** (1) | 18,986 | 2–3 |
| 6 | April 16 | Cubs | 7–6 (12) | **Romo** (1–1) | Hernandez | — | 28,985 | 3–3 |
| 7 | April 17 | Cubs | 2–10 | Noles | **Baumgarten** (0–1) | — | 6,436 | 3–4 |
| 8 | April 18 | Cubs | 1–5 | Jenkins | **Solomon** (0–2) | Martz | 8,028 | 3–5 |
| 9 | April 20 | Cardinals | 4–7 | Martin | **Rhoden** (0–1) | Sutter | 3,534 | 3–6 |
| 10 | April 21 | Cardinals | 2–6 | Mura | **Candelaria** (0–1) | Sutter | 3,589 | 3–7 |
| 11 | April 23 | @ Cubs | 12–10 | **Solomon** (1–2) | Noles | **Tekulve** (1) | 8,813 | 4–7 |
| 12 | April 24 | @ Cubs | 8–5 | **Robinson** (1–0) | Martz | — | 19,312 | 5–7 |
| 13 | April 25 | @ Cubs | 3–5 | Martz | **Rhoden** (0–2) | — | 29,832 | 5–8 |
| 14 | April 26 | @ Braves | 6–4 | **Tekulve** (2–0) | McWilliams | — | 9,557 | 6–8 |
| 15 | April 27 | @ Braves | 10–4 | **Griffin** (1–1) | Walk | — | 6,763 | 7–8 |
| 16 | April 28 | @ Braves | 6–7 (10) | Camp | **Scurry** (1–1) | — | 6,318 | 7–9 |
| 17 | April 29 | Astros | 9–6 | **Romo** (2–1) | LaCoss | **Scurry** (2) | 4,716 | 8–9 |
| 18 | April 30 | Astros | 3–4 | Sutton | **Rhoden** (0–3) | Smith | 8,768 | 8–10 |

May: 10–17 (Home: 5–8; Away: 5–9)

| # | Date | Opponent | Score | Win | Loss | Save | Attendance | Record |
|---|---|---|---|---|---|---|---|---|
| 19 | May 1 | Astros | 3–6 | Ryan | **Moskau** (0–1) | Smith | 19,626 | 8–11 |
| 20 | May 2 | Astros | 2–6 | Niekro | **Griffin** (1–2) | Moffitt | 11,116 | 8–12 |
| 21 | May 3 | Braves | 4–10 | Niekro | **Solomon** (1–3) | Garber | 4,636 | 8–13 |
| 22 | May 4 | Braves | 8–4 | **Robinson** (2–0) | Cowley | — | 4,836 | 9–13 |
| 23 | May 5 | Braves | 4–2 | **Rhoden** (1–3) | Mahler | **Tekulve** (2) | 6,595 | 10–13 |
| 24 | May 7 | @ Reds | 0–5 | Soto | **Moskau** (0–2) | — | 16,465 | 10–14 |
| 25 | May 8 | @ Reds | 4–2 (15) | **Sarmiento** (1–0) | Shirley | — | 19,626 | 11–14 |
| 26 | May 9 | @ Reds | 6–3 | **Robinson** (3–0) | Seaver | **Tekulve** (3) | 21,416 | 12–14 |
| 27 | May 10 | @ Astros | 3–7 | Sutton | **Rhoden** (1–4) | — | 16,141 | 12–15 |
| 28 | May 11 | @ Astros | 2–4 | Ryan | **Griffin** (1–3) | Smith | 17,893 | 12–16 |
| 29 | May 13 | Reds | 1–2 | Price | **Scurry** (1–2) | Hume | 7,354 | 12–17 |
| 30 | May 14 | Reds | 8–7 | **Romo** (3–1) | Kern | **Tekulve** (4) | 15,271 | 13–17 |
| 31 | May 15 | Reds | 12–9 | **Rhoden** (2–4) | Pastore | — | 11,184 | 14–17 |
| 32 | May 16 | Reds | 1–3 | Soto | **Solomon** (1–4) | — | 21,561 | 14–18 |
| 33 | May 18 | @ Giants | 1–2 | Laskey | **Candelaria** (0–2) | — | 8,925 | 14–19 |
| 34 | May 19 | @ Giants | 2–1 | **Robinson** (4–0) | Chris | **Tekulve** (5) | 5,042 | 15–19 |
| 35 | May 20 | @ Giants | 1–3 | Lavelle | **Scurry** (1–3) | — | 4,085 | 15–20 |
| 36 | May 21 | @ Padres | 5–7 | Montefusco | **Solomon** (1–5) | Lucas | 14,043 | 15–21 |
| 37 | May 22 | @ Padres | 3–12 | Eichelberger | **Moskau** (0–3) | — | 20,732 | 15–22 |
| 38 | May 23 | @ Padres | 4–2 | **Candelaria** (1–2) | Curtis | **Scurry** (3) | 17,005 | 16–22 |
| 39 | May 24 | @ Dodgers | 9–3 | **Robinson** (5–0) | Niedenfuer | — | 43,274 | 17–22 |
| 40 | May 25 | @ Dodgers | 2–5 | Valenzuela | **Rhoden** (2–5) | — | 46,486 | 17–23 |
| 41 | May 26 | @ Dodgers | 2–3 | Reuss | **Solomon** (1–6) | Howe | 41,594 | 17–24 |
| 42 | May 28 | Giants | 5–10 | Laskey | **Candelaria** (1–3) | — | 7,273 | 17–25 |
| 43 | May 29 | Giants | 5–9 | Barr | **Robinson** (5–1) | — | 8,283 | 17–26 |
| 44 | May 30 | Giants | 7–6 (13) | **Solomon** (2–6) | Barr | — | 18,279 | 18–26 |
| 45 | May 31 | Dodgers | 4–5 | Howe | **Tekulve** (2–1) | Forster | 7,826 | 18–27 |

June: 17–9 (Home: 8–6; Away: 9–3)

| # | Date | Opponent | Score | Win | Loss | Save | Attendance | Record |
|---|---|---|---|---|---|---|---|---|
| 46 | June 1 | Dodgers | 3–1 | **Candelaria** (2–3) | Reuss | **Tekulve** (6) | 5,189 | 19–27 |
| 47 | June 2 | Dodgers | 8–7 | **Scurry** (2–3) | Romo | — | 8,535 | 20–27 |
| 48 | June 3 | Expos | 5–4 (10) | **Scurry** (3–3) | Smith | — | 4,158 | 21–27 |
| 49 | June 4 | Padres | 4–5 | Curtis | **Rhoden** (2–6) | Lucas | 5,584 | 21–28 |
| 50 | June 6 | Padres | 2–1 | **Tekulve** (3–1) | Lollar | — | 11,714 | 22–28 |
| 51 | June 7 | @ Mets | 4–3 (12) | **Scurry** (4–3) | Allen | — | 8,791 | 23–28 |
| 52 | June 8 | @ Mets | 6–2 | **Robinson** (6–1) | Orosco | **Tekulve** (7) | 11,774 | 24–28 |
| 53 | June 9 | @ Mets | 2–3 | Allen | **Tekulve** (3–2) | — | 11,552 | 24–29 |
| 54 | June 11 | @ Phillies | 1–0 | **Tekulve** (4–2) | Christenson | — | 30,870 | 25–29 |
| 55 | June 12 | @ Phillies | 9–2 | **Sarmiento** (2–0) | Krukow | — | 28,665 | 26–29 |
| 56 | June 14 | Mets | 1–2 | Falcone | **Robinson** (6–2) | Allen | 7,005 | 26–30 |
| 57 | June 15 | Mets | 13–3 | **Rhoden** (3–6) | Puleo | — | 6,100 | 27–30 |
| 58 | June 17 | Phillies | 3–4 (11) | Reed | **Scurry** (4–4) | — | 9,405 | 27–31 |
| 59 | June 18 | Phillies | 3–8 | Krukow | **Sarmiento** (2–1) | — | 23,320 | 27–32 |
| 60 | June 19 | Phillies | 3–8 | Carlton | **Robinson** (6–3) | — | 13,065 | 27–33 |
| 61 | June 20 | Phillies | 3–1 | **Tekulve** (5–2) | Ruthven | — | 25,791 | 28–33 |
| 62 | June 21 | Cubs | 4–3 | **Moskau** (1–3) | Smith | **Tekulve** (8) | 6,136 | 29–33 |
| 63 | June 22 | Cubs | 9–2 | **Candelaria** (3–3) | Martz | **Romo** (1) | 6,174 | 30–33 |
| 64 | June 23 | Cubs | 5–6 (10) | Campbell | **Niemann** (0–1) | — | 8,297 | 30–34 |
| 65 | June 25 | @ Expos | 4–3 | **Robinson** (7–3) | Sanderson | — | | 31–34 |
| 66 | June 25 | @ Expos | 9–7 | **Rhoden** (4–6) | Burris | — | 51,360 | 32–34 |
| 67 | June 26 | @ Expos | 14–5 | **Romo** (4–1) | Lea | — | 34,293 | 33–34 |
| 68 | June 27 | @ Expos | 2–5 | Palmer | **Candelaria** (3–4) | — | 34,398 | 33–35 |
| 69 | June 28 | @ Cubs | 4–6 | Tidrow | **Romo** (4–2) | — | 6,974 | 33–36 |
| 70 | June 29 | @ Cubs | 3–1 | **Rhoden** (5–6) | Jenkins | — | 22,109 | 34–36 |
| 71 | June 30 | @ Cubs | 7–3 | **Robinson** (8–3) | Smith | **Scurry** (4) | 10,058 | 35–36 |

July: 18–10 (Home: 9–5; Away: 9–5)

| # | Date | Opponent | Score | Win | Loss | Save | Attendance | Record |
|---|---|---|---|---|---|---|---|---|
| 72 | July 1 | @ Cubs | 5–2 | **Romo** (5–2) | Campbell | — | 10,463 | 36–36 |
| 73 | July 2 | Expos | 6–3 | **Candelaria** (4–4) | Lea | **Tekulve** (9) | | 37–36 |
| 74 | July 2 | Expos | 7–2 | **McWilliams** (1–0) | Schatzeder | **Scurry** (5) | 21,665 | 38–36 |
| 75 | July 3 | Expos | 4–2 | **Sarmiento** (3–1) | Palmer | **Tekulve** (10) | 20,853 | 39–36 |
| 76 | July 4 | Expos | 6–16 | Rogers | **Rhoden** (5–7) | — | | 39–37 |
| 77 | July 4 | Expos | 10–4 | **Robinson** (9–3) | Gullickson | **Tekulve** (11) | 23,031 | 40–37 |
| 78 | July 5 | Astros | 4–6 | Niekro | **Baumgarten** (0–2) | — | 10,437 | 40–38 |
| 79 | July 6 | Astros | 1–0 | **McWilliams** (2–0) | Knepper | — | 8,850 | 41–38 |
| 80 | July 7 | Reds | 3–6 | Hume | **Tekulve** (5–3) | Harris | 20,024 | 41–39 |
| 81 | July 8 | Reds | 9–8 | **Tekulve** (6–3) | Price | — | 9,950 | 42–39 |
| 82 | July 9 | @ Braves | 4–6 | Diaz | **Rhoden** (5–8) | Bedrosian | 28,601 | 42–40 |
| 83 | July 10 | @ Braves | 6–1 | **Robinson** (10–3) | Niekro | — | 39,444 | 43–40 |
| 84 | July 11 | @ Braves | 3–1 | **McWilliams** (3–0) | Dayley | **Tekulve** (12) | 19,130 | 44–40 |
| 85 | July 15 | @ Astros | 5–1 | **Candelaria** (5–4) | Sutton | **Scurry** (6) | 17,662 | 45–40 |
| 86 | July 16 | @ Astros | 2–4 | Ryan | **McWilliams** (3–1) | — | 19,037 | 45–41 |
| 87 | July 17 | @ Astros | 3–4 (10) | Niekro | **Tekulve** (6–4) | — | 28,672 | 45–42 |
| 88 | July 18 | @ Astros | 2–4 | Knepper | **Robinson** (10–4) | — | 19,218 | 45–43 |
| 89 | July 19 | @ Reds | 5–4 | **Sarmiento** (4–1) | Pastore | **Tekulve** (13) | 16,395 | 46–43 |
| 90 | July 20 | @ Reds | 3–1 | **Candelaria** (6–4) | Berenyi | **Tekulve** (14) | 17,395 | 47–43 |
| 91 | July 21 | @ Reds | 3–2 | **McWilliams** (4–1) | Hume | **Tekulve** (15) | 16,543 | 48–43 |
| 92 | July 23 | Braves | 6–0 | **Rhoden** (6–8) | Camp | — | 22,722 | 49–43 |
| 93 | July 24 | Braves | 3–4 | Niekro | **Robinson** (10–5) | Garber | 26,790 | 49–44 |
| 94 | July 25 | Braves | 8–0 | **Candelaria** (7–4) | Mahler | — | 22,565 | 50–44 |
| 95 | July 27 | Phillies | 4–0 | **McWilliams** (5–1) | Ruthven | **Scurry** (7) | 23,609 | 51–44 |
| 96 | July 28 | Phillies | 3–4 | Christenson | **Rhoden** (6–9) | Reed | 31,867 | 51–45 |
| 97 | July 29 | @ Mets | 4–1 | **Robinson** (11–5) | Falcone | — | 16,892 | 52–45 |
| 98 | July 30 | @ Mets | 5–1 | **Candelaria** (8–4) | Swan | **Sarmiento** (1) | 18,828 | 53–45 |
| 99 | July 31 | @ Mets | 4–9 | Puleo | **Tekulve** (6–5) | Allen | 48,358 | 53–46 |

August: 17–16 (Home: 10–9; Away: 7–7)

| # | Date | Opponent | Score | Win | Loss | Save | Attendance | Record |
|---|---|---|---|---|---|---|---|---|
| 100 | August 1 | @ Mets | 4–3 (10) | **Tekulve** (7–5) | Leach | **Scurry** (8) | 21,871 | 54–46 |
| 101 | August 2 | @ Cardinals | 4–2 (17) | **Romo** (6–2) | Kaat | — | 19,653 | 55–46 |
| 102 | August 3 | @ Cardinals | 2–4 | Forsch | **Robinson** (11–6) | Sutter | 20,253 | 55–47 |
| 103 | August 4 | @ Cardinals | 5–2 | **Candelaria** (9–4) | LaPoint | **Scurry** (9) | 20,673 | 56–47 |
| 104 | August 5 | @ Cardinals | 3–7 (5) | Mura | **McWilliams** (5–2) | — | 17,145 | 56–48 |
| 105 | August 6 | Mets | 7–3 | **Sarmiento** (5–1) | Scott | — | | 57–48 |
| 106 | August 6 | Mets | 3–7 | Jones | **Baumgarten** (0–3) | Allen | 21,210 | 57–49 |
| 107 | August 7 | Mets | 2–5 | Zachry | **Rhoden** (6–10) | — | 19,938 | 57–50 |
| 108 | August 8 | Mets | 4–1 | **Robinson** (12–6) | Swan | **Tekulve** (16) | 19,679 | 58–50 |
| 109 | August 9 | @ Phillies | 3–4 | Carlton | **Tekulve** (7–6) | — | | 58–51 |
| 110 | August 9 | @ Phillies | 9–6 | **Romo** (7–2) | Reed | **Tekulve** (17) | 51,568 | 59–51 |
| 111 | August 10 | @ Phillies | 5–9 | Bystrom | **Sarmiento** (5–2) | — | 36,825 | 59–52 |
| 112 | August 11 | @ Phillies | 1–4 | Monge | **Rhoden** (6–11) | Reed | 27,202 | 59–53 |
| 113 | August 12 | Cardinals | 2–3 | Andujar | **Baumgarten** (0–4) | Sutter | 16,430 | 59–54 |
| 114 | August 13 | Cardinals | 7–4 | **Robinson** (13–6) | Forsch | — | 25,700 | 60–54 |
| 115 | August 14 | Cardinals | 1–4 | Stuper | **Candelaria** (9–5) | Sutter | 15,828 | 60–55 |
| 116 | August 15 | Cardinals | 5–12 | Mura | **McWilliams** (5–3) | — | | 60–56 |
| 117 | August 15 | Cardinals | 2–5 | LaPoint | **Sarmiento** (5–3) | — | 31,755 | 60–57 |
| 118 | August 17 | Giants | 4–1 | **Rhoden** (7–11) | Hammaker | — | 11,345 | 61–57 |
| 119 | August 18 | Giants | 9–16 | Fowlkes | **Robinson** (13–7) | — | 14,205 | 61–58 |
| 120 | August 19 | Giants | 6–1 | **Candelaria** (10–5) | Gale | — | 8,015 | 62–58 |
| 121 | August 20 | Dodgers | 0–1 | Valenzuela | **McWilliams** (5–4) | — | 15,245 | 62–59 |
| 122 | August 21 | Dodgers | 2–1 | **Tekulve** (8–6) | Howe | — | 29,581 | 63–59 |
| 123 | August 22 | Dodgers | 4–3 (14) | **Robinson** (14–7) | Beckwith | — | 19,006 | 64–59 |
| 124 | August 23 | Padres | 8–6 | **Candelaria** (11–5) | Hawkins | **Scurry** (10) | | 65–59 |
| 125 | August 23 | Padres | 3–5 | Welsh | **Baumgarten** (0–5) | Chiffer | 9,194 | 65–60 |
| 126 | August 24 | Padres | 6–5 (11) | **Tekulve** (9–6) | Eichelberger | — | 13,102 | 66–60 |
| 127 | August 25 | Padres | 7–6 | **Tekulve** (10–6) | Chiffer | — | 9,485 | 67–60 |
| 128 | August 27 | @ Giants | 3–2 | **Rhoden** (8–11) | Laskey | **Scurry** (11) | 9,820 | 68–60 |
| 129 | August 28 | @ Giants | 2–4 | Hammaker | **Robinson** (14–8) | Minton | 15,759 | 68–61 |
| 130 | August 29 | @ Giants | 4–3 | **Candelaria** (12–5) | Martin | **Scurry** (12) | 22,017 | 69–61 |
| 131 | August 30 | @ Padres | 1–2 (13) | DeLeon | **Tekulve** (10–7) | — | 20,718 | 69–62 |
| 132 | August 31 | @ Padres | 7–1 | **Sarmiento** (6–3) | Montefusco | — | 7,826 | 70–62 |

September: 13–14 (Home: 7–4; Away: 6–10)

| # | Date | Opponent | Score | Win | Loss | Save | Attendance | Record |
|---|---|---|---|---|---|---|---|---|
| 133 | September 1 | @ Padres | 1–4 | Eichelberger | **Rhoden** (8–12) | — | 6,814 | 70–63 |
| 134 | September 3 | @ Dodgers | 3–2 | **Robinson** (15–8) | Welch | **Scurry** (13) | 49,573 | 71–63 |
| 135 | September 4 | @ Dodgers | 1–0 | **Tunnell** (1–0) | Valenzuela | **Tekulve** (18) | 49,541 | 72–63 |
| 136 | September 5 | @ Dodgers | 1–2 (10) | Niedenfuer | **Tekulve** (10–8) | — | 46,819 | 72–64 |
| 137 | September 6 | Mets | 6–1 | **Rhoden** (9–12) | Falcone | — | 38,052 | 73–64 |
| 138 | September 7 | Mets | 9–5 | **Sarmiento** (7–3) | Scott | — | 6,837 | 74–64 |
| 139 | September 8 | Mets | 1–9 | Ownbey | **Robinson** (15–9) | — | 7,092 | 74–65 |
| 140 | September 10 | Phillies | 5–7 | Ruthven | **Candelaria** (12–6) | Monge | 15,596 | 74–66 |
| 141 | September 11 | Phillies | 10–9 | **Tekulve** (11–8) | Reed | — | 19,842 | 75–66 |
| 142 | September 12 | Phillies | 4–2 | **Rhoden** (10–12) | Christenson | **Tekulve** (19) | 19,089 | 76–66 |
| 143 | September 13 | Cubs | 3–7 | Ripley | **Robinson** (15–10) | Hernandez | 2,859 | 76–67 |
| 144 | September 14 | Cubs | 15–5 | **Niemann** (1–1) | Noles | **McWilliams** (1) | 4,822 | 77–67 |
| 145 | September 15 | Cubs | 2–7 | Jenkins | **Candelaria** (12–7) | — | 8,678 | 77–68 |
| 146 | September 17 | @ Phillies | 4–2 | **Rhoden** (11–12) | Carlton | **Tekulve** (20) | 37,262 | 78–68 |
| 147 | September 18 | @ Phillies | 4–5 | Monge | **Robinson** (15–11) | Reed | 31,468 | 78–69 |
| 148 | September 19 | @ Phillies | 8–1 | **Sarmiento** (8–3) | Krukow | — | 37,352 | 79–69 |
| 149 | September 20 | @ Cubs | 1–3 | Noles | **McWilliams** (5–5) | Tidrow | 3,607 | 79–70 |
| 150 | September 21 | @ Cubs | 0–1 | Jenkins | **Scurry** (4–5) | Campbell | 5,237 | 79–71 |
| 151 | September 22 | @ Cardinals | 1–2 | LaPoint | **Rhoden** (11–13) | Sutter | 23,587 | 79–72 |
| 152 | September 23 | @ Cardinals | 5–3 (11) | **Romo** (8–2) | Martin | **Niemann** (1) | 17,399 | 80–72 |
| 153 | September 24 | @ Expos | 4–6 | Lerch | **Robinson** (15–12) | Fryman | 27,678 | 80–73 |
| 154 | September 25 | @ Expos | 4–9 | Sanderson | **Sarmiento** (8–4) | — | 30,419 | 80–74 |
| 155 | September 26 | @ Expos | 3–0 | **McWilliams** (6–5) | Lea | — | 33,473 | 81–74 |
| 156 | September 27 | @ Mets | 1–4 | Holman | **Rhoden** (11–14) | — | 4,412 | 81–75 |
| 157 | September 28 | @ Mets | 2–3 (10) | Orosco | **Romo** (8–3) | — | 3,921 | 81–76 |
| 158 | September 29 | Cardinals | 7–3 | **Romo** (9–3) | Stuper | — | 4,930 | 82–76 |
| 159 | September 30 | Cardinals | 7–2 | **Sarmiento** (9–4) | Mura | **Scurry** (14) | 4,237 | 83–76 |

October: 1–2 (Home: 1–2; Away: 0–0)

| # | Date | Opponent | Score | Win | Loss | Save | Attendance | Record |
|---|---|---|---|---|---|---|---|---|
| 160 | October 1 | Expos | 5–8 (11) | Fryman | **Tunnell** (1–1) | Reardon | 4,549 | 83–77 |
| 161 | October 2 | Expos | 2–1 | **Tekulve** (12–8) | Gullickson | — | 4,496 | 84–77 |
| 162 | October 3 | Expos | 1–6 | Rogers | **Robinson** (15–13) | — | 14,948 | 84–78 |

Legend: = Win = Loss
Bold = Pirates team member

== Roster ==
1982 Pittsburgh Pirates
Roster
| Pitchers: 34 Ross Baumgarten; 45 John Candelaria; 23 Tom Griffin; 47 Cecilio Guante; 23 Grant Jackson; 49 Larry McWilliams; 41 Paul Moskau; 23 Randy Niemann; 29 Rick Rhoden; 43 Don Robinson; 15 Enrique Romo; 38 Manny Sarmiento; 19 Rod Scurry; 44 Eddie Solomon; 27 Kent Tekulve; 22 Lee Tunnell | Catchers: 16 Steve Nicosia; 36 Junior Ortiz; 6 Tony Peña; Infielders: 37 Rafael Belliard; 4 Dale Berra; 5 Bill Madlock; 34 John Milner; 14 Willie Montañez; 2 Jim Morrison; 22 Nelson Norman; 3 Johnny Ray; 10 Ken Reitz; 11 Jim Smith; 8 Willie Stargell; 30 Jason Thompson; 50 Eddie Vargas | Outfielders: 28 Dick Davis; 24 Mike Easler; 51 Doug Frobel; 12 Brian Harper; 44,10 Richie Hebner; 17 Lee Lacy; 18 Omar Moreno; 28 Wayne Nordhagen; 39 Dave Parker; 28 Bill Robinson; 46 Reggie Walton | Manager: 7 Chuck Tanner; Coaches: 31 Harvey Haddix (pitching); 32 Joe Lonnett (third base); 42 Alex Monchak (first base); 48 Bob Skinner (hitting) |

=== Opening Day Lineup ===
Opening Day Starters
| # | Name | Position |
|---|---|---|
| 18 | Omar Moreno | CF |
| 24 | Mike Easler | LF |
| 39 | Dave Parker | RF |
| 30 | Jason Thompson | 1B |
| 5 | Bill Madlock | 3B |
| 6 | Tony Peña | C |
| 3 | Johnny Ray | 2B |
| 4 | Dale Berra | SS |
| 29 | Rick Rhoden | SP |

== Player stats ==
Batting

Note: G = Games played; AB = At bats; H = Hits; Avg. = Batting average; HR = Home runs; RBI = Runs batted in

Regular season
| Player | G | AB | H | Avg. | HR | RBI |
|---|---|---|---|---|---|---|
| R. Niemann | 20 | 2 | 2 | 1.000 | 0 | 0 |
| R. Belliard | 9 | 2 | 1 | 0.500 | 0 | 0 |
| W. Nordhagen | 1 | 4 | 2 | 0.500 | 0 | 2 |
| E. Vargas | 8 | 8 | 3 | 0.375 | 0 | 3 |
| B. Madlock | 154 | 568 | 181 | 0.319 | 19 | 95 |
| L. Lacy | 121 | 359 | 112 | 0.312 | 5 | 31 |
| R. Hebner | 25 | 70 | 21 | 0.300 | 2 | 12 |
| E. Romo | 46 | 10 | 3 | 0.300 | 0 | 0 |
| T. Peña | 138 | 497 | 147 | 0.296 | 11 | 63 |
| J. Thompson | 156 | 550 | 156 | 0.284 | 31 | 101 |
| D. Robinson | 43 | 85 | 24 | 0.282 | 2 | 16 |
| J. Ray | 162 | 647 | 182 | 0.281 | 7 | 63 |
| W. Montañez | 36 | 32 | 9 | 0.281 | 0 | 1 |
| S. Nicosia | 39 | 100 | 28 | 0.280 | 1 | 7 |
| J. Morrison | 44 | 86 | 24 | 0.279 | 4 | 15 |
| B. Harper | 20 | 29 | 8 | 0.276 | 2 | 4 |
| M. Easler | 142 | 475 | 131 | 0.276 | 15 | 58 |
| D. Parker | 73 | 244 | 66 | 0.270 | 6 | 29 |
| R. Rhoden | 36 | 83 | 22 | 0.265 | 3 | 12 |
| D. Berra | 156 | 529 | 139 | 0.263 | 10 | 61 |
| O. Moreno | 158 | 645 | 158 | 0.245 | 3 | 44 |
| J. Milner | 33 | 25 | 6 | 0.240 | 2 | 8 |
| B. Robinson | 31 | 71 | 17 | 0.239 | 4 | 12 |
| R. Scurry | 76 | 21 | 5 | 0.238 | 0 | 1 |
| J. Smith | 42 | 42 | 10 | 0.238 | 0 | 4 |
| W. Stargell | 74 | 73 | 17 | 0.233 | 3 | 17 |
| J. Candelaria | 33 | 54 | 12 | 0.222 | 0 | 9 |
| T. Griffin | 6 | 9 | 2 | 0.222 | 0 | 2 |
| D. Frobel | 16 | 34 | 7 | 0.206 | 2 | 3 |
| J. Ortiz | 7 | 15 | 3 | 0.200 | 0 | 0 |
| R. Walton | 13 | 15 | 3 | 0.200 | 0 | 0 |
| M. Sarmiento | 35 | 47 | 9 | 0.191 | 0 | 4 |
| L. McWilliams | 20 | 32 | 6 | 0.188 | 0 | 0 |
| D. Davis | 39 | 77 | 14 | 0.182 | 2 | 10 |
| E. Solomon | 12 | 15 | 2 | 0.133 | 0 | 1 |
| P. Moskau | 13 | 11 | 1 | 0.091 | 0 | 0 |
| R. Baumgarten | 12 | 12 | 1 | 0.083 | 0 | 0 |
| K. Tekulve | 85 | 14 | 1 | 0.071 | 0 | 0 |
| C. Guante | 10 | 5 | 0 | 0.000 | 0 | 0 |
| N. Norman | 3 | 3 | 0 | 0.000 | 0 | 0 |
| K. Reitz | 7 | 10 | 0 | 0.000 | 0 | 0 |
| L. Tunnell | 5 | 4 | 0 | 0.000 | 0 | 0 |
| G. Jackson | 1 | 0 | 0 | — | 0 | 0 |
| Team totals | 162 | 5,614 | 1,535 | 0.273 | 134 | 688 |

Pitching

Note: G = Games pitched; IP = Innings pitched; W = Wins; L = Losses; ERA = Earned runs average; SO = Strikeouts

Regular season
| Player | G | IP | W | L | ERA | SO |
|---|---|---|---|---|---|---|
| R. Scurry | 76 | 103 2/3 | 4 | 5 | 1.74 | 94 |
| K. Tekulve | 85 | 128 2/3 | 12 | 8 | 2.87 | 66 |
| J. Candelaria | 31 | 174 2/3 | 12 | 7 | 2.94 | 133 |
| L. McWilliams | 19 | 121 2/3 | 6 | 5 | 3.11 | 94 |
| C. Guante | 10 | 27 | 0 | 0 | 3.33 | 26 |
| M. Sarmiento | 35 | 164 2/3 | 9 | 4 | 3.39 | 81 |
| L. Tunnell | 5 | 18 1/3 | 1 | 1 | 3.93 | 4 |
| R. Rhoden | 35 | 230 1/3 | 11 | 14 | 4.14 | 128 |
| D. Robinson | 38 | 227 | 15 | 13 | 4.28 | 165 |
| E. Romo | 45 | 86 2/3 | 9 | 3 | 4.36 | 58 |
| P. Moskau | 13 | 35 | 1 | 3 | 4.37 | 15 |
| R. Niemann | 20 | 35 1/3 | 1 | 1 | 5.09 | 26 |
| R. Baumgarten | 12 | 44 | 0 | 5 | 6.55 | 17 |
| E. Solomon | 11 | 46 2/3 | 2 | 6 | 6.75 | 18 |
| T. Griffin | 6 | 22 1/3 | 1 | 3 | 8.87 | 8 |
| G. Jackson | 1 | 2/3 | 0 | 0 | 13.50 | 0 |
| Team totals | 162 | 1,466 2/3 | 84 | 78 | 3.81 | 933 |

== Awards and honors ==
1982 Major League Baseball All-Star Game

- Tony Peña, C, reserve
- Jason Thompson, 1B, reserve

== Transactions ==
- October 5, 1981 – Released Luis Tiant.
- October 23, 1981 – Purchased Manny Sarmiento from the Boston Red Sox.
- October 26, 1981 – Released Kurt Bevacqua.
- November 6, 1981 – Signed Rubén Rodríguez as an amateur free agent.
- December 11, 1981 – Signed Dorn Taylor as an amateur free agent.
- December 11, 1981 – Traded Tim Foli to the California Angels. Received Brian Harper.
- December 11, 1981 – Traded Doe Boyland to the San Francisco Giants. Received Tom Griffin.
- December 17, 1981 – Sold Craig Cacek to the California Angels.
- January 12, 1982 – Drafted Benny Distefano in the 2nd round of the 1982 amateur draft (January Secondary).
- February 2, 1982 – The Chicago White Sox chose Joel Skinner as a free agent compensation pick.
- March 10, 1982 – Sold Mark Lee to the Detroit Tigers.
- March 21, 1982 – Traded Ernie Camacho and Vance Law to the Chicago White Sox. Received Ross Baumgarten and Butch Edge.
- March 29, 1982 – Sold Matt Alexander to Mexico City Tigers (Mexican).
- April 1, 1982 – Traded Victor Cruz to the Texas Rangers. Received Nelson Norman.
- April 2, 1982 – Released Gary Alexander.
- April 3, 1982 – Selected Paul Moskau off waivers from the Baltimore Orioles.
- April 4, 1982 – Released Ramon Pena.
- April 8, 1982 – Released Stew Cliburn.
- April 9, 1982 – Purchased Reggie Walton from the Seattle Mariners.
- May 15, 1982 – Released Tom Griffin.
- May 16, 1982 – Signed Ken Reitz as a free agent.
- June 5, 1982 – Released Ken Reitz.
- June 7, 1982 – Drafted Sam Khalifa in the 1st round (7th pick) of the 1982 amateur draft.
- June 7, 1982 – Drafted Bip Roberts in the 1st round (13th pick) of the 1982 amateur draft (June Secondary). Player signed June 11, 1982.
- June 7, 1982 – Drafted Joe Magrane in the 3rd round of the 1982 amateur draft, but did not sign the player.
- June 7, 1982 – Drafted Scott Bailes in the 4th round of the 1982 amateur draft (June Secondary). Player signed July 1, 1982.
- June 7, 1982 – Drafted Ray Hayward in the 12th round of the 1982 amateur draft, but did not sign the player.
- June 7, 1982 – Drafted Shawn Holman in the 14th round of the 1982 amateur draft. Player signed June 15, 1982.
- June 10, 1982 – Signed Dave Johnson as an amateur free agent.
- June 14, 1982 – Traded Eddie Solomon to the Chicago White Sox. Received Jim Morrison.
- June 15, 1982 – Traded Bill Robinson to the Philadelphia Phillies. Received Wayne Nordhagen.
- June 22, 1982 – Traded a player to be named later to the Toronto Blue Jays. Received Dick Davis. The Pittsburgh Pirates sent Wayne Nordhagen (June 25, 1982) to the Toronto Blue Jays to complete the trade.
- June 30, 1982 – Traded a player to be named later and Pascual Perez to the Atlanta Braves. Received Larry McWilliams. The Pittsburgh Pirates sent Carlos Rios (minors) (September 8, 1982) to the Atlanta Braves to complete the trade.
- July 1, 1982 – Released Willie Montañez.
- July 29, 1982 – Signed John Milner as a free agent.
- August 16, 1982 – Purchased Richie Hebner from the Detroit Tigers.
- September 8, 1982 – Signed Grant Jackson as a free agent.
- October 4, 1982 – Released Grant Jackson.
- October 4, 1982 – Released Paul Moskau.
- October 20, 1982 – Bob Long granted free agency.

== Farm system ==
| Level | Team | League | Manager |
|---|---|---|---|
| AAA | Portland Beavers | Pacific Coast League | Tom Trebelhorn |
| AA | Buffalo Bisons | Eastern League | Tommy Sandt |
| A | Alexandria Dukes | Carolina League | Johnny Lipon |
| A | Greenwood Pirates | South Atlantic League | Joe Frisina |
| Rookie | GCL Pirates | Gulf Coast League | Woody Huyke |

LEAGUE CHAMPIONS: Alexandria
