= Jim Smith =

Jim Smith may refer to:

== Arts and entertainment ==
- Jim Smith (animator) (1954–2025), American animator and co-writer on The Ren & Stimpy Show
- Jim Cooray Smith (born 1978), British writer of directorial critical biographies and television guides, also involved with the Kaldor City series
- Jim Field Smith (born 1979), British film director, comedy writer and actor
- Jim Smith (author) (born 1975), British author, illustrator and designer
- Jim Smith (bassist) (born 1958), bass guitarist of Cardiacs

== Politics ==
- Jim Smith (Indiana politician), member of the Indiana State Senate
- Jim Smith (Nebraska politician) (born 1959), member of the Nebraska Legislature
- Jim Smith (New Mexico politician), member of the New Mexico Legislature and Bernalillo County Commission
- Jim Smith (Nova Scotia politician) (1935–2020), MLA and cabinet minister in Nova Scotia, Canada
- Jim Smith Jr., American politician, elected to represent Alabama's 6th Senate district in 1982

== Sports ==
=== Footballers ===
- Jim Smith (footballer, born 1863) (1863–1937), English football player
- Jim Smith (footballer, born 1937) (1937–2002), Scottish football player (Preston North End)
- Jim Smith (footballer, born 1940) (1940–2019), English football player and manager
- Jim Smith (Cavan Gaelic footballer) (1901–1970), Irish Gaelic footballer
- Jim Smith (Louth Gaelic footballer) (1887–1951), Irish Gaelic footballer
- Jim Smith (footballer, born 1887) (1887–?), Australian rules footballer who played with South Melbourne
- Jim Smith (footballer, born 1947), Australian rules footballer who played with Hawthorn
- Jim Ray Smith (born 1932), American football player
- Jim Smith (defensive back) (born 1946), former American football defensive back in the National Football League for the Washington Redskins

=== Other sports ===
- Jim Smith (baseball coach) (died 2001), LSU Tigers baseball head coach 1966–1978
- Jim Smith (basketball coach) (born 1934), college basketball head coach
- Jim Smith (basketball, born 1958), former NBA player
- Jim Smith (catcher), Negro league baseball player
- Jim Smith (cricketer, born 1906) (1906–1979), English cricketer
- Jim Smith (cricketer, born 1940), New Zealand cricketer
- Jim Smith (ice hockey, born 1957), (born 1957), President of USA Hockey
- Jim Smith (ice hockey, born 1964), Canadian ice hockey player
- Jim Smith (second baseman), Negro league baseball player
- Jim Smith (shortstop) (born 1954), major league infielder who played for the Pittsburgh Pirates in the 1982 season
- Jim Smith (wide receiver) (born 1955), former NFL and USFL wide receiver
- Jim Smith (decathlete) (born 1946), English decathlete
- Jim Smith (runner) (1913–1999), 1937 NCAA mile runner-up for the Indiana Hoosiers track and field team

== Others ==
- Jim Smith (racing businessman), owner of Ultra Motorsports
- Jim Smith (business executive), CEO of Thomson Reuters
- Jim Cuthbert Smith (born 1954), scientist

== See also ==
- James Smith (disambiguation)
- Jimmy Smith (disambiguation)
- Jim Smyth, retired Canadian police officer
