= Jimmy Smith =

Jimmy Smith or Jimmie Smith may refer to:

== Music ==
- Jimmy Smith (musician) (1928–2005), American jazz organist
- Jimmy "Jammin'" Smith (1926–1953), American jazz trumpeter
- Jimmie Smith (musician) (1938–2024), American jazz drummer
- Jimmy Smith, guitarist for English indie band Foals
- Jimmy Smith, a quarterfinalist on the twelfth season of American Idol
- Jimmy Smith (born 1943), American keyboardist

== Sports ==
=== American football ===
- Jimmy Smith (running back) (born 1960), American football player
- Jimmy Smith (wide receiver) (born 1969), former NFL player with the Jacksonville Jaguars
- Jimmy Smith (cornerback) (born 1988), American football player for the Baltimore Ravens
- Jimmy Smith (American football coach), American college football coach
- Jimmy Smith (defensive back, born 1945), American football defensive back

=== Association football ===
- Jimmy Smith (footballer, born 1889) (c. 1889–1918), English centre forward who played for Brighton & Hove Albion and Bradford (Park Avenue)
- Jimmy Smith (footballer, born 1896) (1896–1945), Scottish footballer who played primarily for Aberdeen
- Jimmy Smith (footballer, born 1901) (1901–1964), Scottish goalkeeper
- Jimmy Smith (footballer, born 1902) (1902–1975), Scottish footballer who played for numerous clubs
- Jimmy Smith (Hearts footballer), Scottish footballer who played for several clubs, primarily Heart of Midlothian
- Jimmy Smith (footballer, born 1911) (1911–2003), Scottish footballer who played for Rangers
- Jimmy Smith (footballer, born 1930) (1930–2022), English footballer for Chelsea and Leyton Orient
- Jimmy Smith (footballer, born 1947), Scottish footballer who played for Newcastle United
- Jimmy Smith (footballer, born 1987), English footballer who played for Chelsea, Leyton Orient, Stevenage, Crawley Town and Yeovil Town

=== Other sports ===
- James Smith (boxer) (born 1953), American boxer, WBA world Heavyweight champion 1986-1987
- Jimmy Smith (Australian footballer) (1877–1948), Australian rules footballer and coach of St Kilda
- Jimmy Smith (1910s infielder) (1895–1974), Major League Baseball infielder who played from 1914 until 1922
- Jimmy Smith (basketball, born 1934) (1934–2002), American basketball player
- Jimmy Smith (fighter) (born 1977), American MMA commentator
- Jimmy Smith (1900s infielder) (1874–1960), Negro leagues infielder from 1902 to 1909
- Jimmy Smith (rugby league) (born 1971), Australian rugby league footballer

== Others ==
- Jimmie Smith (Mississippi politician) (born 1952), mayor of Meridian, Mississippi
- Jimmie Todd Smith (born 1965), Florida politician
- Jimmy Neil Smith (1945–2025), American journalist
- Jimmy Smith, a.k.a. B-Rabbit, the main character in the movie 8 Mile, based on and played by Eminem

== See also ==
- Jim Smith (disambiguation)
- James Smith (disambiguation)
- Jimmy Smyth (hurler) (1931–2013), Irish hurler
