= Rosyth Recreation F.C. =

Rosyth Recreation F.C. may refer to:

- Rosyth F.C., an association football club which existed from 1992 to 2024, previously known as Rosyth Recreation
- Rosyth Dockyard Recreation F.C., an association football club which existed from 1916 to 1957
