= Rosyth Dockyard Recreation F.C. =

Former association football club in Rosyth, Scotland

Rosyth Dockyard Recreation
- Full name: Rosyth Dockyard Recreation F.C.
- Founded: 1918
- Dissolved: 1957
- Ground: Rosyth Recreation Park
- Capacity: 8,000
- Match secretary: A. E. Jinks (1920s), Bill McAvoy (1950s)
- Trainer: Kenny Campbell (1930s)
colours

Rosyth Dockyard Recreation F.C. was a Scottish association football club, which twice played in the Scottish Cup in the 1930s.

== History ==
The club, from Rosyth in Fifeshire, was made up of men from the Rosyth naval base. It was in essence a football-playing sub-section of the Rosyth Recreation athletic club, and the club funded both Junior and Senior sides at various times from 1918 to 1957. It was also referred to as Rosyth Recreation.

The first references to the club come from the 1918–19 season; at the time it was a Junior club and entered the Scottish Junior Cup, reaching the third round in its first season in the competition, albeit after a bye and a walkover. It won its way through to the third round on merit in 1923–24, the furthest it reached in the competition before the war, and won the West Fife Junior Cup, thanks to a 3–1 home win over Kelty Rangers. It also played in junior leagues in Fife from 1920–21 to 1925–26, without success.

The club joined the Scottish Football Association in 1933–34, entitling it to play in the Scottish Qualifying Cup and Fife Cup. It only played in the latter competition once, in 1934–35, losing its only fixture 2–0 at Dunfermline Athletic. However, in the club's first attempt in the Qualifying Cup, it won the North section, beating Ross County 4–1 in the final at Pittodrie; Rosyth turned the tie around on the half-hour, Garland and Clusker scoring within a minute to take the club from 1–0 down to 2–1 up, and County's goalkeeper Sherlaw was injured in failing to stop the second.

The triumph put the club into the first round of the 1933–34 Scottish Cup, the club then losing at Vale of Leithen. It also entered the Edinburgh & District League that season, finishing second, 11 points behind runaway winner Penicuik Athletic.

The club reached the North final again in 1934–35, losing to Clachnacuddin (again at Pittodrie), but this time the club won its first round tie in the 1934–35 Scottish Cup, 3–1 at Berwick Rangers, despite - or because of - Rangers bringing in players from Newcastle United and Alnwick to bolster the forward line. Rosyth only narrowly went down to Airdrieonians in the second round. The club was also declared the champion of the Edinburgh & District League, although the league had diminished from 13 clubs to 5, and not all matches were played.

The club entered the Qualifying Cup until 1938–39, but never won another tie - its final appearance was a 5–4 defeat at Dunkeld & Birnam.

After the Second World War, the club returned to the Junior rank. It had significant success at local level, winning the Fife Junior League and Cup in 1949–50, and beating Newburgh 8–2 in the final of the Cowdenbeath Junior Cup, at East End Park, Colin Syme and Bobby Simpson both scoring hat-tricks. In 1950–51, Recreation had its best run in the Scottish Junior Cup, by getting to the sixth round for the only time, where the club lost 1–0 at home to Irvine Meadow XI; its tie with Luncarty in the fifth round had to be replayed, after Luncarty protested successfully against Rosyth's Richard Sharpe being a senior player. However the club's reliance on the Recreation Club was its downfall; the club announced in 1957 that its playing field was to be closed, and as a result the football club folded.

== Colours ==
The club wore red and yellow hooped jerseys, white shorts, and red socks.

== Ground ==
The club played at the Rosyth Recreation Park, where the Reserve Fleet had its athletic games. The highest attendance was in the Junior Cup 6th round tie against Irvine Meadow in March 1951, with a reputed 5,000 fans travelling from Ayrshire helping to swell the crowd to 8,000.

== Notable players ==
- Jimmy Smith, the club's goalkeeper in the early 1920s, who later played for Tottenham Hotspur
- David Russell, the club's only Junior international, capped in the 1923 match against England at Birmingham City, and who later played for Doncaster Rovers and Leeds United

== Honours ==
- Scottish Cup
  - Best result: 2nd round, 1934–35
- Scottish Qualifying Cup (North)
  - Winner: 1933–34
  - Runner-up: 1934–35
- Edinburgh & District League
  - Winner: 1934–35
  - Runner-up: 1933–34
- Fife County League
  - Winner: 1949–50
- Fife Junior Cup
  - Winner: 1948–49, 1949–50
- West Fife Junior Cup
  - Winner: 1923–24
- Cowdenbeath Junior Cup
  - Winner: 1949–50
