= Steve Mura =

American baseball player (born 1955)

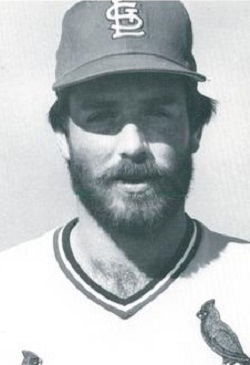
- Pitcher
- Born: February 12, 1955 (age 71); New Orleans, Louisiana, U.S.
- Batted: Right Threw: Right

MLB debut
- September 5, 1978, for the San Diego Padres

Last MLB appearance
- October 6, 1985, for the Oakland Athletics

MLB statistics
- Win–loss record: 30–39
- Earned run average: 4.00
- Strikeouts: 360
- Stats at Baseball Reference

Teams
- San Diego Padres (1978–1981); St. Louis Cardinals (1982); Chicago White Sox (1983); Oakland Athletics (1985)

Career highlights and awards
- World Series champion (1982)

Stephen Andrew Mura (born February 12, 1955) is an American former Major League Baseball player. A pitcher, Mura played from 1978 to 1985 with the San Diego Padres, St. Louis Cardinals, Chicago White Sox, and Oakland Athletics. He was a member of the Cardinals' 1982 World Series winning team.

Mura played college baseball at Tulane University from 1974 to 1976.
