= Jimmy Smith (Hearts footballer) =

Scottish footballer

Personal information
- Full name: James B. Smith
- Place of birth: Glasgow, Scotland
- Position: Outside right

Senior career*
Years	Team	Apps	(Gls)
–	St Anthony's		
1921–1923	Dunfermline Athletic	59	(16)
1923	→ Clydebank (loan)	9	(10)
1923–1924	Clydebank	40	(3)
1924–1931	Heart of Midlothian	164	(48)
1927	→ Bo'ness (loan)	1	(0)
1928	→ Raith Rovers (loan)	8	(2)
1932–1934	Cork City		
1934–1936	East Stirlingshire	61	(28)
1934–1936	Dundee United	51	(19)

International career
1924–1927	Scottish League XI	3	(2)
- * Club domestic league appearances and goals

James B. Smith was a Scottish footballer who played for clubs including Dunfermline Athletic, Heart of Midlothian and Dundee United as an outside right, though he began his career as a centre forward and in the last years of his career was used at inside left.

He made three appearances for the Scottish League XI (all in the annual fixture against the Irish League representative team), and played in a trial for the full Scotland team in 1924.
