= Jim Smith (footballer, born 1947) =

Australian rules footballer

Personal information
- Full name: Jim Smith
- Born: 8 December 1947 (age 78)
- Original team: Korumburra
- Height: 188 cm (6 ft 2 in)
- Weight: 99 kg (218 lb)

Playing career^{1}
Years	Club	Games (Goals)
1968	Hawthorn	4 (0)
- ^{1} Playing statistics correct to the end of 1968.

Jim Smith (born 8 December 1947) is a former Australian rules footballer who played with Hawthorn in the Victorian Football League (VFL).
