= Billy Smith (1980s pitcher) =

American baseball player (1954–2025)

- Pitcher
- Born: September 13, 1954; La Marque, Texas, U.S.
- Died: April 5, 2025 (aged 70); Woodlands, Texas, U.S.
- Batted: Right Threw: Right

MLB debut
- June 9, 1981, for the Houston Astros

Last MLB appearance
- October 3, 1981, for the Houston Astros

MLB statistics
- Win–loss record: 1–1
- Earned run average: 3.05
- Strikeouts: 3
- Stats at Baseball Reference

Teams
- Houston Astros (1981)

Billy Lavern Smith (September 13, 1954 – April 5, 2025) was an American Major League Baseball pitcher who appeared in ten games with the Houston Astros in 1981.

== Biography ==
Smith played college baseball for Wharton County Junior College and Sam Houston State University (1974-77) before being drafted by the Astros in the fourteenth round of the 1977 Major League Baseball draft. Over four seasons in their farm system, he was primarily a starting pitcher, however, when he played his one season in the majors, he was used primarily in relief.

He made his major league debut on June 9 against the Philadelphia Phillies, just before the player strike interrupted the season. He allowed two earned runs in two innings pitched, including a solo home run to Bob Boone.

In the second half of the season, he emerged as one of the stars of Houston's bullpen that helped them capture the second half crown. On August 12, he earned his only career save against the San Francisco Giants. On August 29, he made his only career start, and pitched seven scoreless innings against the Phillies for his only career win. Overall, he was 1–1 with a 2.41 earned run average in nine games over the second half of the season. In the 1981 National League Division Series, he faced one batter, Dusty Baker, and got him to ground out.

Smith was not the only Billy Smith in the majors in 1981. The San Francisco Giants had an infielder also named Billy Smith.

Smith spent all of 1982 in the Pacific Coast League with the Tucson Toros, where he went 4–8 with a 7.15 ERA. Smith pitched the next two seasons for Nuevo Laredo in the Mexican League, winning 15 games. He retired after the 1984 season.

Among other jobs after baseball, Smith worked as a private pitching coach. Smith died on April 5, 2025, at the age of 70.
