= Bert Peña =

Puerto Rican baseball player (1959–2023)

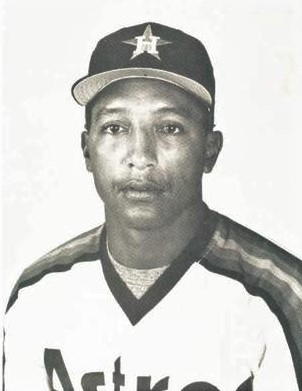
- Shortstop
- Born: July 11, 1959; Santurce, Puerto Rico
- Died: January 19, 2023 (aged 63); Caguas, Puerto Rico
- Batted: Right Threw: Right

MLB debut
- September 14, 1981, for the Houston Astros

Last MLB appearance
- July 19, 1987, for the Houston Astros

MLB statistics
- Batting average: .203
- Home runs: 1
- Runs batted in: 10
- Stats at Baseball Reference

Teams
- Houston Astros (1981, 1983–1987)

Adalberto Peña Rivera (July 11, 1959 – January 19, 2023) was a Puerto Rican professional baseball shortstop. He played in Major League Baseball (MLB) for the Houston Astros in 1981, and from 1983 to 1987. Peña played only 88 games for the Astros across his six seasons, most of them as a late-inning defensive replacement; about half his games were played after rosters were expanded in September. His most productive season was in 1985, when he batted .276 in 20 games. He later managed for three seasons in the independent Atlantic League, and led the Puerto Rican team in the 2005 Baseball World Cup and 2006 Central American and Caribbean Games.

== Career ==
Peña's professional career extended for 12 seasons, 1977–1988. Although he appeared in parts of six years in the majors, he spent most of the seasons from 1981 to 1987 with the Triple-A Tucson Toros, where he had over 60 runs batted in three times. In 1984 he saw his most lengthy major league service, with 24 games played for Houston, and collecting his only big-league home run, hit off Ricky Horton of the St. Louis Cardinals on September 2 at Busch Stadium; it was Houston's only run in a 4–1 defeat.

In 88 major league games, Peña collected 31 hits, four of them doubles. He batted .231 in 1,224 minor league games.

== Personal life and death ==
Bert's son, Roberto, is a professional baseball player.

Peña died on January 19, 2023, in Caguas, Puerto Rico, from esophageal cancer. He was 63.

== See also ==
- List of Major League Baseball players from Puerto Rico
