= Paul Moskau =

American baseball player (born 1953)

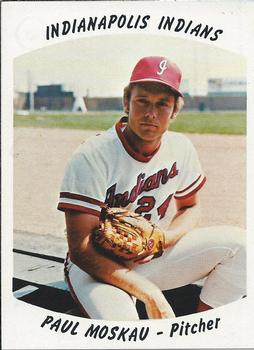
- Pitcher
- Born: December 20, 1953 (age 71); St. Joseph, Missouri, U.S.
- Batted: Right Threw: Right

MLB debut
- June 21, 1977, for the Cincinnati Reds

Last MLB appearance
- May 31, 1983, for the Chicago Cubs

MLB statistics
- Win–loss record: 32–27
- Earned run average: 4.22
- Strikeouts: 374
- Stats at Baseball Reference

Teams
- Cincinnati Reds (1977–1981); Pittsburgh Pirates (1982); Chicago Cubs (1983)

Paul Richard Moskau (born December 20, 1953) is a former Major League Baseball pitcher who pitched for the Cincinnati Reds, Pittsburgh Pirates and Chicago Cubs. He debuted on June 21, 1977, starting against the Philadelphia Phillies and hitting a home run. He was not involved in the decision, however, as the Reds won 10–5. His first major league win came on July 15, 1977, in an 8–3 win over the Houston Astros.

He was acquired by the Baltimore Orioles on February 10, 1982 in a transaction that was completed five days later when the Reds received Wayne Krenchicki. But he was quickly selected off waivers by the Pirates and he never appeared in a game for the Orioles. After posting a 4.37 earned run average, he was released by the Pirates on October 4, 1982. He was picked up by the Chicago Cubs who released him near the end of the next season.
