= Eddie Vargas =

Puerto Rican baseball player (born 1959)

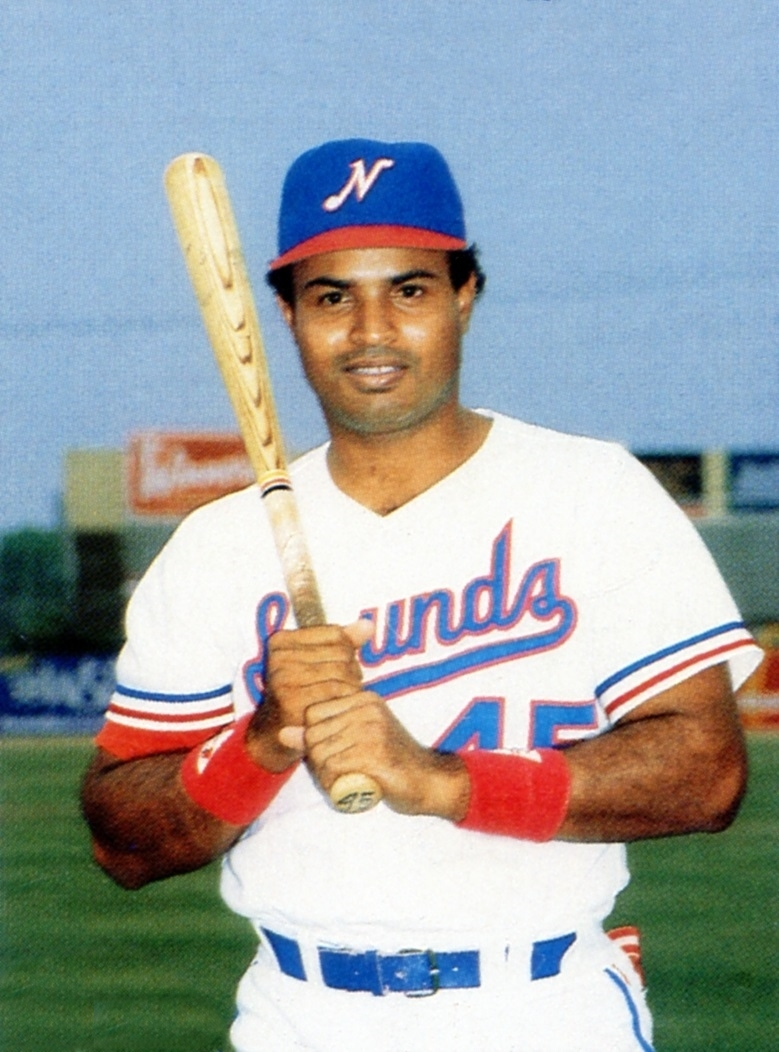
- Vargas with the Nashville Sounds in 1988
- First baseman
- Born: February 23, 1959 (age 67); Guánica, Puerto Rico
- Batted: Right Threw: Right

MLB debut
- September 8, 1982, for the Pittsburgh Pirates

Last MLB appearance
- September 30, 1984, for the Pittsburgh Pirates

MLB statistics
- Batting average: .256
- Runs: 4
- Hits: 10
- Stats at Baseball Reference

Teams
- Pittsburgh Pirates (1982, 1984)

Hediberto "Eddie" Vargas Rodriguez (born February 23, 1959) is a Puerto Rican former Major League Baseball (MLB) first baseman. He played during two seasons at the major league level for the Pittsburgh Pirates. He was signed as undrafted amateur free agent by the Pirates in 1977. Vargas played his first professional season (in American baseball) with their Rookie league GCL Pirates in 1977, and split his last season with the California Angels' Class A (Quad City Angels) and Double-A (Midland Angels) teams in 1989.

== See also ==
- List of Major League Baseball players from Puerto Rico
