= Jim Smith (footballer, born 1887) =

Australian rules footballer

Personal information
- Full name: Jim Smith
- Born: 11 February 1887
- Original team: Marylebone

Playing career^{1}
Years	Club	Games (Goals)
1906	South Melbourne	3 (1)
- ^{1} Playing statistics correct to the end of 1906.

Jim Smith (born 11 February 1887) was an Australian rules footballer who played with South Melbourne in the Victorian Football League (VFL).
