= Jimmy Smith (American football coach) =

American football player and coach

Biographical details
- Born: Los Angeles, California, U.S.

Playing career
- 1918–1921: USC
- Position: End

Coaching career (HC unless noted)
- 1922: Loyola (CA)

Head coaching record
- Overall: 3–4–1

James Smith was an American college football coach. He served as the head coach at Loyola College of Los Angeles—now known as Loyola Marymount University—in 1922. He led Loyola to a 3–4–1 record.

A native of Los Angeles, California, Smith attended Los Angeles High School. He attended college at the University of Southern California, where he played on the USC Trojans football team as a right end.

== Head coaching record ==
Year	Team	Overall	Conference	Standing	Bowl/playoffs
Loyola Lions (California Coast Conference) (1922)
1922	Loyola	3–4–1	1–1	T–4th	
Loyola:		3–4–1	1–1		
Total:		3–4–1			
