= Joe Pittman (baseball) =

American baseball player (1953-2014)

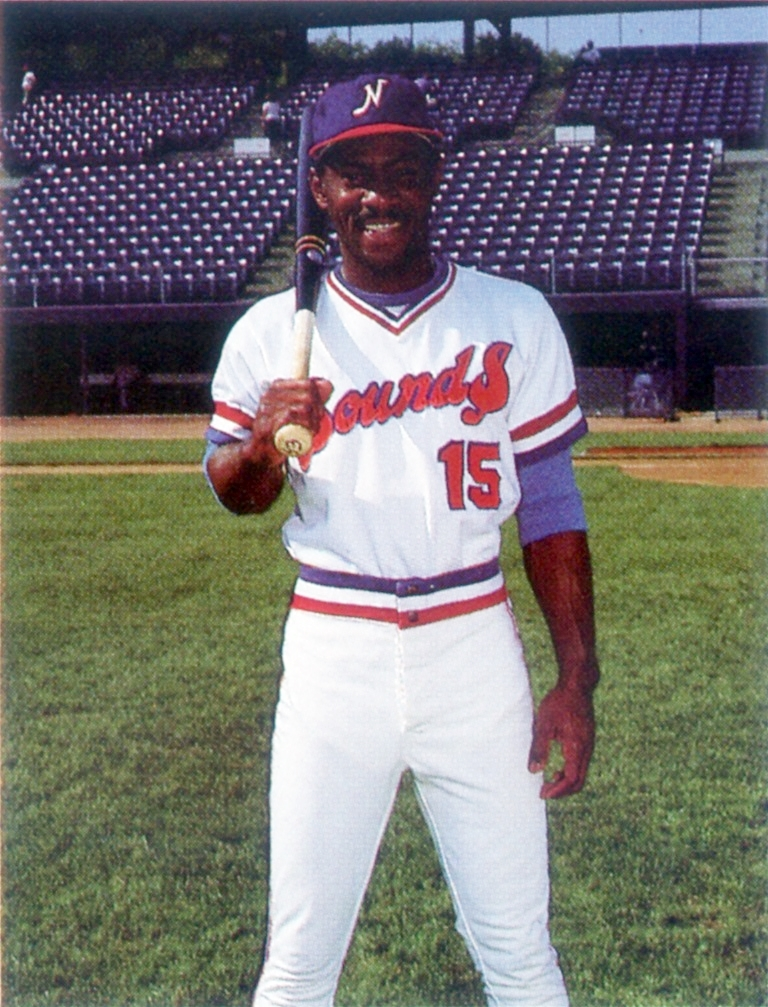
- Pittmann with the Nashville Sounds in 1985
- Infielder
- Born: January 1, 1953; Houston, Texas, U.S.
- Died: June 13, 2014 (aged 61); Lake Jackson, Texas, U.S.
- Batted: Right Threw: Right

MLB debut
- April 25, 1981, for the Houston Astros

Last MLB appearance
- May 30, 1984, for the San Francisco Giants

MLB statistics
- Batting average: .263
- On-base percentage: .309
- Runs batted in: 16
- Stats at Baseball Reference

Teams
- Houston Astros (1981–1982); San Diego Padres (1982); San Francisco Giants (1984)

Joseph Wayne Pittman (January 1, 1953 – June 13, 2014) was a backup infielder/outfielder in Major League Baseball who played for the Houston Astros, San Diego Padres and San Francisco Giants in parts of three seasons spanning 1981–1984. Listed at 6 feet 1 inch (1.85 m), 180 pounds (82 kg), Pittman batted and threw right handed. He was dubbed 'Shoes'.

Born in Houston, Texas, Pittman was selected by the Astros in the 5th round of the 1975 MLB draft out of Southern University and A&M College in Baton Rouge, Louisiana. He debuted professionally for their Double-A Columbus Astros club late in the year.

In between, he played winter baseball with the Cardenales de Lara and Navegantes de Magallanes clubs of the Venezuelan League. He then won the Senior Professional Baseball Association championship with the St. Petersburg Pelicans in its 1989 inaugural season.

Following his playing retirement, Pittman coached in the minors and also served as an scout for the Astros organization.

In June 2014, Pittman was working a construction job in Freeport, Texas, when he suddenly collapsed. Immediate attempts to revive him were unsuccessful. He died in Lake Jackson, Texas, at the age of 61.
