= Reggie Walton (baseball) =

American baseball player (born 1952)

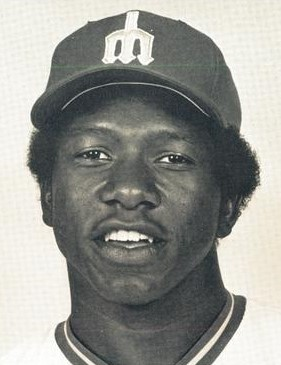
- Walters in 1980
- Outfielder
- Born: October 24, 1952 (age 74); Kansas City, Missouri, U.S.
- Batted: Right Threw: Right

MLB debut
- June 13, 1980, for the Seattle Mariners

Last MLB appearance
- June 6, 1982, for the Pittsburgh Pirates

MLB statistics
- Batting average: .250
- Home runs: 2
- Runs batted in: 9
- Stats at Baseball Reference

Teams
- Seattle Mariners (1980–1981); Pittsburgh Pirates (1982)

Reginald Sherard Walton (born October 24, 1952) is a former professional baseball player. He played for the Seattle Mariners and Pittsburgh Pirates of Major League Baseball (MLB). He played the 1980 and 1981 seasons for the Seattle Mariners and his final season for the Pirates in 1982. His batting average was .250, and he played outfield.

Walton attended Compton High School and Compton College in Compton, California, where he was named to the All-Western State Conference team in both baseball and football.

The San Francisco Giants drafted Walton in the 1972 MLB draft. He was a California League All-Star in 1974. The Giants later released him, and he played two seasons in the Mexican Baseball League. In 1978, he led the Triple-A Spokane Indians in batting average and runs.

The Mariners called up Walton on June 11. He had an RBI single in his first at bat with Seattle, though he spent much of his first month in MLB on the bench before returning to the minors. He returned to the majors in late August, hitting his first home run in his first plate appearance, a pinch-hit, two-run dinger on August 25. 1980 was his most productive MLB season, batting .277 with two home runs and nine RBI in 31 games. He played in eight games for the Mariners in 1981.

Seattle traded Walton to the Pirates during spring training in 1982. He returned to the majors for a month while Dave Parker went on the disabled list. Walton played in 13 games, starting once and batting .200. He played in the minors in 1983. In 10 seasons in Minor League Baseball, Walton had a .299 batting average and 77 home runs.
