= Jimmy Smith (footballer, born 1901) =

Scottish footballer

Personal information
- Full name: James McQueen Anderson Smith
- Date of birth: 28 November 1901
- Place of birth: Leith, Scotland
- Date of death: April 9, 1964 (aged 62)
- Place of death: Kirkcaldy, Scotland
- Height: 5 ft 11 in (1.80 m)
- Position: Goalkeeper

Youth career
- Rosyth Juniors

Senior career*
Years	Team	Apps	(Gls)
	Rosyth Recreation	?	
	East Fife	?	
1925–1926	Tottenham Hotspur	30	(0)
1929–1930	St Johnstone	3	(0)
1930–1931	Norwich City	31	(0)
1931–1932	Ayr United	1	(0)
- * Club domestic league appearances and goals

James McQueen Anderson Smith (28 November 1901 – 9 April 1964) was a Scottish professional footballer who played as a goalkeeper for Rosyth Juniors, Rosyth Recreation, East Fife, Tottenham Hotspur, St Johnstone, Norwich City and Ayr United.

== Football career ==
Smith played for Rosyth Juniors and later at Rosyth Recreation before joining East Fife. In 1925 he signed for Tottenham Hotspur where he played in a total of 31 matches in all competitions. After leaving White Hart Lane, Smith had spells at St Johnstone and Norwich City where he made a further 31 appearances before ending his football career at Ayr United.
