= Jim Smith (shortstop) =

American baseball player (born 1954)

- Shortstop/Pinch runner
- Born: September 8, 1954 (age 70); Santa Monica, California
- Batted: Right Threw: Right

MLB debut
- April 12, 1982, for the Pittsburgh Pirates

Last MLB appearance
- September 28, 1982, for the Pittsburgh Pirates

MLB statistics
- Batting average: .238
- Home runs: 0
- Runs batted in: 4
- Stats at Baseball Reference

Teams
- Pittsburgh Pirates (1982)

James Lorne Smith (born September 8, 1954) is a former Major League Baseball player who played for the Pittsburgh Pirates in 1982. He was used as both a shortstop and a pinch runner.
