= Athletics all-time roster =

List of baseball players

The Athletics all–time roster is a list of people who have played at least one game for the Athletics, Oakland Athletics, Kansas City Athletics, or Philadelphia Athletics baseball teams of the American League, along with their primary position and years played for the team. It does not include players for the 1871–76 Philadelphia Athletics, the 1882–1890 Philadelphia Athletics, or the 1891 Philadelphia Athletics. The only Athletics player with no regular season appearances is Mark Kiger who only played for Oakland during two games in the 2006 American League Championship Series.

- Names in **bold** are members of the National Baseball Hall of Fame and Museum.

== A ==
- Andy Abad, IF, 2001
- Fernando Abad, P, 2014–15
- Glenn Abbott, P, 1973–76
- Kurt Abbott, IF, 1993, 1998
- Al Aber, P, 1957
- Tal Abernathy, P, 1942–44
- Jeremy Accardo, P, 2012
- Domingo Acevedo, P, 2021–23
- Merito Acosta, OF, 1918
- Mark Acre, P, 1994–97
- Garrett Acton, P, 2023
- Austin Adams, P, 2024
- Dick Adams, IF, 1947
- Mike Adams, OF, 1978
- Willie Adams, P, 1918–19
- Willie Adams, P, 1996–97
- Dick Adkins, IF, 1942
- Troy Afenir, C, 1990–91
- Jesús Aguilar, 1B, 2023
- Jack Aker, P, 1964–68
- Darrel Akerfelds, P, 1986
- Arismendy Alcantara, 2B, 2016
- Raul Alcantara, P, 2016–17
- Mike Aldrete, OF, 1993–95
- Elvis Alvarado, P, 2025-Present
- Armando Alvarez, IF, 2024
- R.J. Alvarez, P, 2015
- CJ Alexander, IF, 2025
- Gary Alexander, C, 1978
- Jason Alexander, P, 2025
- Matt Alexander, OF, 1975–77
- Scott Alexander, P, 2024
- Austin Allen, C, 2020–22
- Bob Allen, OF, 1919
- Brandon Allen, IF, 2011–12
- Dick Allen, IF, 1977
- Nick Allen, SS, 2022–24
- Dana Allison, P, 1991
- Bill Almon, IF, 1983–84
- Yonder Alonso, 1B, 2016–17
- Felipe Alou, OF, 1970–71
- Jesús Alou, OF, 1973–74
- Matty Alou, OF, 1972
- Dell Alston, OF, 1978
- George Alusik, OF, 1962–64
- Brant Alyea, OF, 1972
- Wayne Ambler, IF, 1937–39
- Walter Ancker, P, 1915
- Brett Anderson, P, 2009–13, 2018–19
- Bryan Anderson, C, 2014–15
- Dwain Anderson, IF, 1971–72
- Tanner Anderson, P, 2019
- Walter Anderson, P, 1917–19
- Elbert Andrews, P, 1925
- Mike Andrews, IF, 1973
- Elvis Andrus, SS, 2021–22
- Joaquín Andújar, P, 1986–87
- Miguel Andujar, OF, 2024–25
- Kevin Appier, P, 1999–2000
- Fred Applegate, P, 1904
- Fred Archer, P, 1936–37
- Jim Archer, P, 1961–62
- Marcos Armas, IF, 1993
- Tony Armas, OF, 1977–82
- Harry Armbruster, OF, 1906
- George Armstrong, C, 1946
- Howard Armstrong, P, 1911
- Larry Arndt, IF, 1989
- Orie Arntzen, P, 1943
- Fernando Arroyo, P, 1982–86
- Joe Astroth, C, 1945–56
- Keith Atherton, P, 1983–86
- Tommy Atkins, P, 1909–10
- Drew Avans, OF, 2025
- John Axford, P, 2016–17
- Joe Azcue, C, 1962–63

== B ==
- Loren Babe, IF, 1953
- Johnny Babich, P, 1940–41
- Shooty Babitt, IF, 1981
- Eddie Bacon, P, 1917
- Bill Bagwell, OF, 1925
- Stan Bahnsen, P, 1975–77
- Andrew Bailey, P, 2009–12
- Gene Bailey, OF, 1917
- Homer Bailey, P, 2019
- **Harold Baines**, DH, 1990–92
- Doug Bair, P, 1977, 1986
- Jeff Baisley, IF, 2008
- Bock Baker, P, 1901
- Dusty Baker, OF, 1985–86
- **Frank Baker**, IF, 1908–14
- Neal Baker, P, 1927
- Scott Baker, P, 1995
- Steve Baker, P, 1982–83
- Grant Balfour, P, 2011–13
- Chris Bando, C, 1989
- Sal Bando, IF, 1966–76
- Everett Bankston, OF, 1915
- Wes Bankston, IF, 2008
- Dave Barbee, OF, 1926
- Scott Barlow, P, 2026-Present
- Babe Barna, OF, 1937–38
- Mason Barnett, P, 2025-present
- Scotty Barr, OF, 1908–09
- Luis Barrera, OF, 2021–22
- Franklin Barreto, 2B, 2017–20
- Bill Barrett, OF, 1921
- Dick Barrett, P, 1933
- Hardin Barry, P, 1912
- Jack Barry, IF, 1908–15
- John Barthold, P, 1904
- Bill Bartley, P, 1906–07
- Irv Bartling, IF, 1938
- Daric Barton, IF, 2007–14
- Harry Barton, C, 1905
- Chris Bassitt, P, 2015–16, 2018–21
- Brady Basso, P, 2024–Present
- Norm Bass, P, 1961–63
- Charlie Bates, OF, 1927
- Ray Bates, IF, 1917
- Bill Bathe, C, 1986
- Tony Batista, IF, 1996–97
- Allen Battle, OF, 1996
- Chris Batton, P, 1976
- Lou Bauer, P, 1918
- Hank Bauer, OF, 1960–61
- Stan Baumgartner, P, 1924–26
- Mike Baxes, IF, 1956–58
- Don Baylor, DH, 1976, 1988
- Billy Beane, OF, 1989
- Dave Beard, P, 1980–83
- Rich Becker, OF, 1999–2000
- Bill Beckmann, P, 1939–42
- Cam Bedrosian, P, 2021
- Todd Belitz, P, 2000–01
- Kevin Bell, IF, 1982
- Zeke Bella, OF, 1959
- Mark Bellhorn, IF, 1997–98, 2000–01
- **Chief Bender**, P, 1903–14
- Vern Benson, IF, 1943–46
- Al Benton, P, 1934–35
- Johnny Berger, C, 1922
- Tony Bernazard, IF, 1987
- Bill Bernhard, P, 1901, 1902
- Gerónimo Berroa, DH, 1994–97
- Charlie Berry, C, 1925, 1934–38
- Claude Berry, C, 1906–07
- Joe Berry, P, 1944–46
- Reno Bertoia, IF, 1961
- Herman Besse, P, 1940–46
- Jeff Bettendorf, P, 1984
- Christian Bethancourt, 1B, 2022
- Hal Bevan, IF, 1952, 1955
- Hank Biasatti, IF, 1949
- Osvaldo Bido, P, 2024–25
- Brandon Bielak, P, 2024
- Lyle Bigbee, P, 1920
- Bruce Billings, P, 2011
- George Binks, OF, 1947–48
- Tim Birtsas, P, 1985–86
- Bill Bishop, P, 1921
- Charlie Bishop, P, 1952–55
- Max Bishop, IF, 1924–33
- Joe Bitker, P, 1990
- Don Black, P, 1943–45
- Paul Blackburn, P, 2017–24
- Travis Blackley, P, 2012
- Ewell Blackwell, P, 1955
- George Blaeholder, P, 1935
- Buddy Blair, IF, 1942
- Carson Blair, C, 2015
- Ed Blake, P, 1957
- Johnny Blanchard, OF, 1965
- Gil Blanco, P, 1966
- Kyle Blanks, OF/1B, 2014
- Lance Blankenship, OF, 1988–93
- Joe Blanton, P, 2004–08
- Don Blasingame, IF, 1966
- JJ Bleday, OF, 2023–25
- Curt Blefary, OF, 1971–72
- Jeremy Bleich, P, 2018
- Ray Blemker, P, 1960
- Jerry Blevins, P, 2007–13
- Mike Blowers, IF, 1998
- Bert Blue, C, 1908
- Vida Blue, P, 1969–77
- Chet Boak, IF, 1960
- Charlie Boardman, P, 1913–14
- Hiram Bocachica, OF, 2005–07
- Bruce Bochte, IF, 1984–86
- Ping Bodie, OF, 1917
- Joe Boever, P, 1993
- Warren Bogle, P, 1968
- Pat Bohen, P, 1913
- Joe Boley, IF, 1927–32
- Don Bollweg, IF, 1954–55
- Skye Bolt, OF, 2019, 2021-22
- Henry Bolte, OF, 2026-present
- Frank Bonner, IF, 1902
- Boof Bonser, P, 2010
- Dan Boone, P, 1919
- Ray Boone, IF, 1959
- Rich Bordi, P, 1980–81, 1988
- Mike Bordick, IF, 1990–96
- Rick Bosetti, OF, 1981–82
- Dick Bosman, P, 1975–76
- Henry Bostick, IF, 1915
- Rafael Bournigal, IF, 1996–98
- Pat Bourque, IF, 1973–74
- Ben Bowden, P, 2025
- Rob Bowen, C, 2007–08
- Cedrick Bowers, P, 2010
- Jim Bowie, IF, 1994
- Micah Bowie, P, 2002–03
- Charlie Bowles, P, 1943–45
- Weldon Bowlin, IF, 1967
- Joe Bowman, P, 1932
- Ted Bowsfield, P, 1963–64
- Bob Boyd, IF, 1961
- Clete Boyer, IF, 1955–57
- Cloyd Boyer, P, 1955
- Joe Boyle, P, 2023–24
- Dallas Braden, P, 2007–11
- Bill Bradford, P, 1956
- Chad Bradford, P, 2001–05
- Bert Bradley, P, 1983
- Milton Bradley, OF, 2006–07
- Dallas Bradshaw, IF, 1917
- Al Brancato, IF, 1939–45
- Dud Branom, IF, 1927
- Marshall Brant, IF, 1983
- Frank Brazill, IF, 1921–22
- Michael Brady, P, 2017
- Bill Breckinridge, P, 1929
- Craig Breslow, P, 2009–11
- Rube Bressler, OF, 1914–16
- Billy Brewer, P, 1997
- George Brickley, OF, 1913
- Jonah Bride, 2B, 2022–2023
- John Briggs, P, 1960
- John Briscoe, P, 1991–96
- Lou Brissie, P, 1947–51
- Tilson Brito, IF, 1997
- Pete Broberg, P, 1978
- Aaron Brooks, P, 2015, 2018–19, 2024
- Bobby Brooks, OF, 1969–72
- Scott Brosius, IF, 1991–97
- Art Brouthers, IF, 1906
- Andrew Brown, P, 2007–08
- Boardwalk Brown, P, 1911–14
- Darrell Brown, OF, 1982
- Emil Brown, OF, 2008
- Jeremy Brown, C, 2006
- Jim Brown, OF, 1916
- Larry Brown, IF, 1971–72
- Norm Brown, P, 1943–46
- Ollie Brown, OF, 1972
- Seth Brown, OF, 2019–25
- Jerry Browne, IF, 1992–93
- Lou Bruce, OF, 1904
- Earle Brucker Sr., C, 1937–40, 1943
- Earle Brucker Jr., C, 1948
- Frank Bruggy, C, 1922–24
- Jaycob Brugman, OF, 2017
- Mike Brumley, IF, 1994
- George Brunet, P, 1956–60
- Will Brunson, P, 1999–2000
- Billy Bryan, C, 1961–66
- Derek Bryant, OF, 1979
- Ryan Buchter, P, 2018–19
- Travis Buck, OF, 2007–10
- Mark Budaska, DH, 1978–81
- Red Bullock, P, 1936
- Tom Burgmeier, P, 1983–84
- Bill Burgo, OF, 1943–44
- Glenn Burke, OF, 1978–79
- Wally Burnette, P, 1956–58
- Billy Burns, OF, 2014–16
- Dennis Burns, P, 1923–24
- George Burns, IF, 1918–20, 1929
- Joe Burns, IF, 1944–45
- Todd Burns, P, 1988–91
- Ray Burris, P, 1984
- Jeff Burroughs, OF, 1982–84
- John Burrows, P, 1943
- Dick Burrus, IF, 1919–20
- Moe Burtschy, P, 1950–56
- Ed Busch, IF, 1943–45
- Don Buschhorn, P, 1965
- Joe Bush, P, 1912–17, 1928
- Billy Butler, 1B, 2015–16
- Lawrence Butler, 1B/OF, 2023–Present
- Ralph Buxton, P, 1938
- Freddie Bynum, OF, 2005
- Harry Byrd, P, 1950–53
- Eric Byrnes, OF, 2000–05
- Jim Byrnes, C, 1906

== C ==
- Orlando Cabrera, SS, 2009
- Greg Cadaret, P, 1987–89
- Trevor Cahill, P, 2009–11, 2018
- Sugar Cain, P, 1932–35
- Kiko Calero, P, 2005–08
- Fred Caligiuri, P, 1941–42
- Ben Callahan, P, 1983
- John Callahan, C, 1903
- Alberto Callaspo, IF, 2013–14
- Frank Callaway, IF, 1921–22
- Ernie Camacho, P, 1980
- Daz Cameron, OF, 2024
- Kevin Cameron, P, 2009
- Bert Campaneris, IF, 1964–76
- Kevin Campbell, P, 1991–93
- Tom Candiotti, P, 1998–99
- Mark Canha, OF, 2015–21
- José Canseco, OF, 1985–92, 1997
- Ozzie Canseco, OF, 1990
- Guy Cantrell, P, 1927
- Conner Capel, OF, 2022–23
- Andy Carey, IF, 1960–1961
- Andrew Carignan, P, 2011–12
- Charlie Carr, IF, 1901
- Chico Carrasquel, IF, 1958
- Doc Carroll, C, 1916
- Tom Carroll, IF, 1959
- Matt Carson, OF, 2009–10
- Chris Carter, 1B/OF, 2010–12
- Nick Carter, P, 1908
- Sol Carter, P, 1931
- Rico Carty, OF, 1973, 1978
- Joe Cascarella, P, 1934, 1935
- Santiago Casilla, P, 2004–09, 2017–18
- Ryan Castellani, P, 2022
- George Caster, P, 1934–40
- Jim Castiglia, C, 1942
- Alberto Castillo, C, 2005
- Angel Castro, P, 2015
- Luis Castro, IF, 1902
- Ramón Castro, IF, 2004
- Simon Castro, P, 2017
- Danny Cater, IF, 1966–69
- Bill Caudill, P, 1984, 1987
- Jake Caulfield, IF, 1946
- Wayne Causey, IF, 1961–66
- Art Ceccarelli, P, 1955–56
- **Orlando Cepeda**, IF, 1972
- Bob Cerv, OF, 1957–60
- Yoenis Céspedes, OF, 2012–14
- Ron Cey, IF, 1987
- Andrew Chafin, P, 2021
- Dave Chalk, IF, 1979
- Charlie Chant, OF, 1975
- Fred Chapman, IF, 1939–41
- John Chapman, IF, 1924
- Matt Chapman, IF, 2017–21
- Sam Chapman, OF, 1938–51
- Ed Charles, IF, 1962–67
- Ossie Chavarria, IF, 1966–67
- Eric Chavez, IF, 1998–2010
- Jesse Chavez, P, 2012–15
- Harry Chiti, C, 1958–60
- Steve Chitren, P, 1990–91
- Michael Choice, OF, 2013
- Bobby Chouinard, P, 1996
- Ryan Christenson, OF, 1998–2001
- Russ Christopher, P, 1942–47
- Darryl Cias, C, 1983
- Joe Cicero, OF, 1945
- Ed Cihocki, IF, 1932–33
- Gino Cimoli, OF, 1962–64
- Lou Ciola, P, 1943
- Frank Cipriani, OF, 1961
- Bill Cissell, IF, 1937
- Allie Clark, OF, 1951–53
- Doug Clark, OF, 2006
- Jermaine Clark, OF, 2005
- Ron Clark, IF, 1971–72
- Terry Clark, P, 1998–99
- Denzel Clarke, OF, 2025-Present
- Gowell Claset, P, 1933
- Ernie Clement, 3B, 2022
- Lou Clinton, OF, 1965
- Tyler Clippard, P, 2015
- Tom Clyde, P, 1943
- Andy Coakley, P, 1902–06
- **Ty Cobb**, OF, 1927–28
- **Mickey Cochrane**, C, 1925–33
- Chris Codiroli, P, 1982–87
- Chris Coghlan, 2B, 2016
- Mike Colangelo, OF, 2002
- Rocky Colavito, OF, 1964
- Nate Colbert, IF, 1976
- Ed Coleman, OF, 1932–35
- Joe Coleman, P, 1942–53
- Joe Coleman, P, 1977–78
- Ray Coleman, OF, 1948
- Rip Coleman, P, 1957, 1959
- Allan Collamore, P, 1911
- Dave Collins, OF, 1985
- **Eddie Collins**, IF, 1906–14, 1927–30
- Eddie Collins, OF, 1939–42
- **Jimmy Collins**, IF, 1907–08
- Zip Collins, OF, 1921
- Bartolo Colón, P, 2012–13
- Bob Cone, P, 1915
- Billy Conigliaro, OF, 1973
- Bill Connelly, P, 1945
- Steve Connelly, P, 1998
- Brooks Conrad, IF, 2008
- Bill Conroy, C, 1935–37
- Tim Conroy, P, 1978–85
- Billy Consolo, IF, 1962
- Owen Conway, IF, 1915
- Ryan Cook, P, 2012–15
- Bobby Coombs, P, 1933
- Jack Coombs, P, 1906–14
- Pat Cooper, P, 1946–47
- Rocky Coppinger, P, 2001–02
- Art Corcoran, IF, 1915
- Jim Corsi, P, 1988–89, 1992, 1995–96
- Carlos Cortes, OF, 2025-present
- Ray Cosey, PH, 1980
- Jharel Cotton, P, 2016–17
- Ensign Cottrell, P, 1913
- Marlan Coughtry, IF, 1962
- Danny Coulombe, P, 2015–18
- Clint Courtney, C, 1961
- **Stan Coveleski**, P, 1912
- Wes Covington, OF, 1961
- Collin Cowgill, OF, 2012
- Glenn Cox, P, 1955–58
- Jeff Cox, IF, 1980–81
- Toots Coyne, IF, 1914
- Roy Crabb, P, 1912
- Walt Craddock, P, 1955–58
- George Craig, P, 1907
- Bobby Cramer, P, 2010–11
- Doc Cramer, OF, 1929–35
- Sam Crane, IF, 1914–16
- Willie Crawford, OF, 1977
- Jack Crimian, P, 1956
- Coco Crisp, OF, 2010–16
- Jim Cronin, IF, 1929
- Bobby Crosby, IF, 2003–09
- Lave Cross, IF, 1901–05
- Monte Cross, IF, 1902–07
- Cap Crowell, P, 1915–16
- Woody Crowson, P, 1945
- Press Cruthers, IF, 1913–14
- Fausto Cruz, IF, 1994–95
- Juan Cruz, P, 2005–06
- Tim Cullen, IF, 1972
- Dick Culler, IF, 1936
- Aaron Cunningham, OF, 2008–09
- Mike Cunningham, P, 1906
- Jim Curry, IF, 1909
- Jack Cust, OF, 2007–10
- Tyler Cyr, P, 2022

== D ==
- John D'Acquisto, P, 1982
- Carl Dale, P, 1999
- Bud Daley, P, 1958–61
- Pete Daley, C, 1960
- Tom Daley, OF, 1913–14
- Bert Daly, IF, 1903
- Johnny Damon, OF, 2001
- Harry Damrau, IF, 1915
- Art Daney, P, 1928
- Dave Danforth, P, 1911–12
- Buck Danner, IF, 1915
- Ron Darling, P, 1991–95
- Vic Davalillo, OF, 1973–74
- Jeff DaVanon, OF, 2007
- Claude Davidson, IF, 1918
- Logan Davidson, IF, 2025
- Matt Davidson, 3B, 2022
- Chick Davies, P, 1914–15
- Bob Davis, P, 1958–60
- Bud Davis, P, 1915
- Crash Davis, IF, 1940–42
- Harry Davis, IF, 1901–11, 1913–17
- Ike Davis, 1B, 2015
- J. D. Davis, 3B, 2024
- Khris Davis, OF, DH, 2016–20, 2021
- Mike Davis, OF, 1980–87
- Rajai Davis, OF, 2008–10, 2017
- Storm Davis, P, 1987–89, 1993
- Tod Davis, IF, 1949–51
- Tommy Davis, OF, 1970–71
- Bill Dawley, P, 1989
- Fautino de los Santos, P, 2011–12
- Chubby Dean, P, 1936–41
- Jaff Decker, OF, 2017
- David DeJesus, OF, 2011
- Bobby Del Greco, OF, 1961–63
- Jim Delsing, OF, 1960
- Joe DeMaestri, IF, 1953–59
- Billy DeMars, IF, 1948
- Chris Denorfia, OF, 2008–09
- Claud Derrick, IF, 1910–12
- Russ Derry, OF, 1946
- Gene Desautels, C, 1946
- Jimmie DeShong, P, 1932
- Ross Detwiler, P, 2016
- Aledmys Diaz, IF, 2023–24
- Jordan Díaz, 2B, 2022–23
- Jim Dickson, P, 1965–66
- Murry Dickson, P, 1958–59
- Bill Dietrich, P, 1933–36, 1947–48
- Jake Diekman, P, 2019–21
- Bob Dillinger, IF, 1950
- Miguel Diloné, OF, 1978–79
- Lenny DiNardo, P, 2007–08
- Art Ditmar, P, 1954–56, 1961–62
- Moxie Divis, OF, 1916
- Sonny Dixon, P, 1954–55
- Chuck Dobson, P, 1966–73
- Joe Dolan, IF, 1901
- Pat Donahue, C, 1910
- John Donaldson, IF, 1966–74
- Josh Donaldson, IF/C, 2010–14
- Sean Doolittle, P, 2012–17
- Octavio Dotel, P, 2004–05
- Felix Doubront, P, 2015
- Jim Dougherty, P, 1998
- Snooks Dowd, IF, 1919
- Al Downing, P, 1970
- Kelly Downs, P, 1992–93
- Brian Doyle, IF, 1981
- Carl Doyle, P, 1935–36
- Tom Dozier, P, 1986
- Moe Drabowsky, P, 1962–65
- Larry Drake, OF, 1945
- Kirk Dressendorfer, P, 1991
- Stephen Drew, IF, 2012
- Jim Driscoll, IF, 1970
- Michael Driscoll, P, 1916
- Keith Drumright, IF, 1981
- Justin Duchscherer, P, 2003–10
- Jim Duckworth, P, 1966
- Joe Dugan, IF, 1917–21
- Bill Duggleby, P, 1902
- Bob Duliba, P, 1967
- Ryan Dull, P, 2015–19
- Dave Duncan, C, 1964–72
- Taylor Duncan, IF, 1978
- Adam Dunn, DH, 2014
- Steve Dunning, P, 1977
- Carlos Duran, P, 2025
- Erubiel Durazo, DH, 2003–05
- Ryne Duren, P, 1957
- Ray Durham, IF, 2002
- Carl Duser, P, 1956–58
- Jermaine Dye, OF, 2001–04
- Jimmy Dygert, P, 1905–10
- Jimmy Dykes, IF, 1918–32

== E ==
- George Earnshaw, P, 1928–33
- Paul Easterling, OF, 1938
- Vallie Eaves, P, 1935
- Harry Eccles, P, 1915
- **Dennis Eckersley**, P, 1987–95
- Charlie Eckert, P, 1919–22
- Chris Eddy, P, 1995
- Bill Edgerton, P, 1966–67
- Doc Edwards, C, 1963–65
- Mike Edwards, 2B, 1978–80
- Mike Edwards, IF/OF, 2003
- Edwards, IF, 1915
- Ben Egan, C, 1908–12
- Howard Ehmke, P, 1926–30
- Brett Eibner, OF, 2016
- Randy Elliott, OF, 1980
- Dock Ellis, P, 1977
- Mark Ellis, IF, 2002–03, 2005–11
- Bones Ely, IF, 1901
- Alan Embree, P, 2007–08
- Chester Emerson, OF, 1911–12
- Charlie Engle, IF, 1925–26
- Hal Epps, OF, 1944
- Mike Epstein, IF, 1971–72
- Larry Eschen, IF, 1942
- Sammy Esposito, IF, 1963
- Lucas Erceg, P, 2023–24
- Chuck Essegian, OF, 1961, 1963
- Jim Essian, C, 1978–80, 1984
- Bobby Estalella, OF, 1943–45, 1949
- Joey Estes, P, 2023-present
- Marco Estrada, P, 2019
- Seth Etherton, P, 2004–05
- Nick Etten, IF, 1938–39
- Dana Eveland, P, 2008–09
- Tommy Everidge, 1B, 2009
- Art Ewoldt, IF, 1919

== F ==
- Everett Fagan, P, 1943–46
- Frank Fahey, OF, 1918
- Howard Fahey, IF, 1912
- Ferris Fain, IF, 1947–52
- Jim Fairbank, P, 1903–04
- Ron Fairly, IF, 1976
- Cy Falkenberg, P, 1917
- Jeurys Familia, P, 2018, 2023
- Frank Fanovich, P, 1953
- Ed Farmer, P, 1983
- Sal Fasano, C, 2000–01
- Ernie Fazio, IF, 1966
- Ángel Felipe, P, 2023
- Michael Feliz, P, 2021
- Tyler Ferguson, P, 2024–Present
- Ramón Fermín, P, 1995
- Frank Fernández, C, 1970–71
- Bill Ferrazzi, P, 1935
- Tom Ferrick, P, 1941
- Mike Fetters, P, 1998
- Willy Fetzer, PH, 1906
- Mike Fiers, P, 2018–21
- Ed Figueroa, P, 1981
- Pedro Figueroa, P, 2012–13
- Jeremy Fikac, P, 2003
- Eddie Files, P, 1908
- Dana Fillingim, P, 1915
- **Rollie Fingers**, P, 1968–76
- Jim Finigan, IF, 1954–56
- Herman Fink, P, 1935–37
- Lou Finney, OF, 1931–39
- Bill Fischer, P, 1961–63
- Jack Flater, P, 1908
- Paul Fletcher, P, 1996
- **Elmer Flick**, OF, 1902
- Lew Flick, OF, 1943–44
- Mort Flohr, P, 1934
- Jesse Flores, P, 1943–47
- Jose Flores, IF, 2002
- Ron Flores, P, 2005–07
- Stu Flythe, P, 1936
- Hank Foiles, C, 1960
- Wilmer Font, P, 2018
- Ray Fosse, C, 1973–75
- Keith Foulke, P, 2003, 2008
- Dick Fowler, P, 1941–52
- Dustin Fowler, OF, 2018
- Eric Fox, OF, 1992–94
- Jack Fox, OF, 1908
- Jake Fox, IF/OF/C, 2010
- **Nellie Fox**, IF, 1947–49
- **Jimmie Foxx**, IF, 1925–35
- Jeff Francis, P, 2014
- Tito Francona, OF, 1969–70
- Herman Franks, C, 1947–48
- Chick Fraser, P, 1901
- Harvey Freeman, P, 1921
- Mark Freeman, P, 1959
- Nate Freiman, IF, 2013–14
- Tony Freitas, P, 1932–33
- Pat French, OF, 1917
- Walter French, OF, 1923–29
- Marion Fricano, P, 1952–55
- Charlie Fritz, P, 1907
- Harry Fritz, IF, 1913
- Brian Fuentes, P, 2011–12
- Tito Fuentes, IF, 1978
- Ollie Fuhrman, C, 1922
- Shintaro Fujinami, P, 2023
- Sam Fuld, OF, 2014–15
- Dot Fulghum, IF, 1921
- Dave Fultz, OF, 1901–02
- J.J. Furmaniak, OF, 2007
- Mike Fyhrie, P, 2001–02

== G ==
- Augie Galan, OF, 1949
- Sean Gallagher, P, 2008–09
- Mike Gallego, IF, 1985–91, 1995
- Chick Galloway, IF, 1919–27
- Bob Ganley, OF, 1909
- Ron Gant, OF, 2001, 2003
- Joe Gantenbein, IF, 1939–40
- Bob Garbark, C, 1944
- Aramis Garcia, C, 2021
- Dermis García, 1B, 2022
- Rico Garcia, P, 2023
- Nomar Garciaparra, IF/DH, 2009
- Rob Gardner, P, 1971, 1973
- Larry Gardner, IF, 1918
- Dustin Garneau, C, 2019
- Phil Garner, IF, 1973–76
- Adrian Garrett, DH, 1971–72
- Ford Garrison, OF, 1944–46
- Webster Garrison, IF, 1996
- Ned Garver, P, 1957–60
- Charlie Gassaway, P, 1945
- Brent Gates, IF, 1993–96
- Chad Gaudin, P, 2006–08, 2010
- Doc Gautreau, IF, 1925
- Cory Gearrin, P, 2018
- Bob Geary, P, 1918–19
- Phil Geier, OF, 1901
- Zack Gelof, IF, 2023–Present
- Jim Gentile, IF, 1964–65
- Craig Gentry, OF, 2014–15
- Alex George, IF, 1955
- Greek George, C, 1945
- Steve Gerkin, P, 1945
- Esteban Germán, IF, 2002–04
- Jason Giambi, IF, 1995–2001, 2009
- Jeremy Giambi, OF, 2000–02
- Charlie Gibson, C, 1924
- Joe Giebel, C, 1913
- Paul Giel, P, 1961
- Dan Giese, P, 2009
- Bob Giggie, P, 1960, 1962
- J. T. Ginn, P, 2024–Present
- Joe Ginsberg, C, 1956
- Keith Ginter, IF, 2005
- Tommy Giordano, IF, 1953
- Dave Giusti, P, 1977
- Tom Glass, P, 1925
- Ryan Glynn, P, 2005
- Graham Godfrey, P, 2011–12
- Jonny Gomes, OF, 2012–14
- Yan Gomes, C, 2021
- Carlos González, OF, 2008
- Édgar González, P, 2009
- Gio González, P, 2008–11
- Orlando González, IF, 1980
- Lee Gooch, OF, 1917
- Danny Goodwin, DH, 1982
- Tom Gorman, P, 1955–59
- Jim Gosger, OF, 1966–68
- **Rich Gossage**, P, 1992–93
- Daniel Gossett, P, 2017–18
- Billy Grabarkewitz, IF, 1975
- Jason Grabowski, OF, 2002–03
- Milt Graff, IF, 1957–58
- Mudcat Grant, P, 1970–71
- Kendall Graveman, P, 2015–18
- Jeff Gray, P, 2008–09
- Johnny Gray, P, 1954–55
- Sam Gray, P, 1924–27
- Sonny Gray, P, 2013–17
- Tristan Gray, IF, 2024
- Dick Green, IF, 1963–74
- Grant Green, IF, 2013
- Joe Green, PH, 1924
- Luke Gregerson, P, 2014
- Vean Gregg, P, 1918
- Bill Grevell, P, 1919
- Ben Grieve, OF, 1997–2000
- Lee Griffeth, P, 1946
- A. J. Griffin, P, 2012–13
- Ivy Griffin, IF, 1919–21
- Pug Griffin, IF, 1917
- Alfredo Griffin, IF, 1985–87
- Guido Grilli, P, 1966
- Bob Grim, P, 1958–59, 1962
- Oscar Grimes, IF, 1946
- Charlie Grimm, IF, 1916
- Justin Grimm, P, 2022
- Lew Groh, IF, 1919
- Buddy Groom, P, 1996–99
- Gabe Gross, OF, 2010
- Wayne Gross, IF, 1976–83, 1986
- Robbie Grossman, OF, 2019–20
- Johnny Groth, OF, 1956–57
- **Lefty Grove**, P, 1925–33
- Roy Grover, IF, 1916–19
- Al Grunwald, P, 1959
- Joe Grzenda, P, 1964–66
- Reymin Guduan, P, 2021
- Deolis Guerra, P, 2021
- Mike Guerra, C, 1947–50
- Mario Guerrero, IF, 1978–80
- José Guillén, OF, 2003
- Ben Guintini, OF, 1950
- Randy Gumpert, P, 1936–38
- Mark Guthrie, P, 2001
- Johnny Guzman, P, 1991–92

== H ==
- Bruno Haas, P, 1915
- Moose Haas, P, 1986–87
- Mule Haas, OF, 1928–32, 1938
- Bump Hadley, P, 1941
- Kent Hadley, IF, 1958–59
- Bill Haeffner, C, 1915
- Jesse Hahn, P, 2015–17
- Scott Hairston, OF, 2009
- John Halama, P, 2003
- Sammy Hale, IF, 1923–29
- Raymond Haley, C, 1916–17
- Dick Hall, P, 1960
- Irv Hall, IF, 1943–46
- Brad Halsey, P, 2006
- Dave Hamilton, P, 1972–75, 1979–80
- Tom Hamilton (baseball), IF, 1952–53
- Ken Hamlin, IF, 1960
- Luke Hamlin, P, 1944
- Jason Hammel, P, 2014
- Chris Hammond, P, 2004
- Buddy Hancken, C, 1940
- Garry Hancock, OF, 1983–84
- Gene Handley, IF, 1946–47
- Vern Handrahan, P, 1964–66
- Larry Haney, C, 1969–76
- Jay Hankins, OF, 1961–63
- Preston Hanna, P, 1982
- Jack Hannahan, IF, 2007–09
- Jack Hannifin, IF, 1906
- Aaron Harang, P, 2002–03
- Rich Harden, P, 2003–08
- Dan Haren, P, 2005–07
- Tim Harikkala, P, 2005
- Mike Harkey, P, 1995
- Jack Harper, P, 1915
- Brian Harper, C, 1987, 1995
- Tommy Harper, OF, 1975
- Slim Harrell, P, 1912
- Ken Harrelson, IF, 1963–67
- Bill Harrington, P, 1953, 1955–56
- Bob Harris, P, 1942
- Brett Harris, 3B, 2024–Present
- Bubba Harris, P, 1948–49, 1951
- Hogan Harris, P, 2023-present
- Lum Harris, P, 1941–46
- Reggie Harris, P, 1990–91
- Spencer Harris, OF, 1930
- Tom Harrison, P, 1965
- Josh Harrison, 2B, 2021
- Slim Harriss, P, 1920–26
- Topsy Hartsel, OF, 1902–11
- Chad Harville, P, 1999, 2001, 2003–04
- Ron Hassey, C, 1988–90
- Joe Hassler, IF, 1928–29
- Gene Hasson, IF, 1937–38
- Bob Hasty, P, 1919–24
- Chris Hatcher, P, 2017–18
- Scott Hatteberg, IF, 2002–05
- Gary Haught, P, 1997
- Joe Hauser, IF, 1922–28
- Clem Hausmann, P, 1949
- Andy Hawkins, P, 1991
- Jack Hayden, OF, 1901
- Frankie Hayes, C, 1933–42, 1944–45
- Jimmy Haynes, P, 1997–99
- Ryon Healy, 1B, 2016–17
- Thomas Healy, IF, 1915–16
- Mike Heath, C, 1979–85
- Dave Heaverlo, P, 1978–79, 1981
- Don Heffner, IF, 1943
- Mike Hegan, IF, 1971–73
- Fred Heimach, P, 1920–26
- Gorman Heimueller, P, 1983–84
- Heinie Heitmuller, OF, 1909–10
- Woodie Held, IF, 1957–58
- Eric Helfand, C, 1993–95
- Scott Hemond, C, 1989–94
- Dave Henderson, OF, 1988–93
- **Rickey Henderson**, OF, 1979–84, 1989–95, 1998
- Steve Henderson, OF, 1985–87
- George Hendrick, OF, 1971–72
- Liam Hendricks, P, 2016–20
- Weldon Henley, P, 1903–05
- Ray Herbert, P, 1955–61
- Gil Heredia, P, 1998–2001
- Jeremy Hermida, OF, 2010
- Ramón Hernández, C, 1999–2003
- Darell Hernáiz, IF, 2024–Present
- José Herrera, OF, 1995–96
- Troy Herriage, P, 1956
- Chris Herrmann, C, 2019
- Mike Hershberger, OF, 1965–69
- **Whitey Herzog**, OF, 1958–60
- George Hesselbacher, P, 1916
- Ed Heusser, P, 1940
- Johnnie Heving, C, 1931–32
- Jesse Hickman, P, 1965–66
- Brandon Hicks, IF, 2012
- Pinky Higgins, IF, 1930–36
- Charlie High, OF, 1919–20
- Erik Hiljus, P, 2000–02
- Cliff Hill, P, 1917
- Dave Hill, P, 1957
- Donnie Hill, IF, 1983–86
- Jess Hill, OF, 1937
- Rich Hill, P, 2016
- Shawn Hillegas, P, 1992–93
- Ed Hilley, IF, 1903
- A. J. Hinch, C, 1998–2000
- Billy Hitchcock, IF, 1950–52
- Danny Hoffman, OF, 1903–06
- Willie Hogan, OF, 1911
- Gunnar Hoglund, P, 2025-Present
- Wally Holborow, P, 1948
- Matt Holliday, OF, 2009
- Grant Holman, P, 2024–Present
- Jim Holmes, P, 1906
- Chick Holmes, P, 1918
- Jim Holt, OF, 1974–76
- Red Holt, IF, 1925
- Mike Holtz, P, 2002
- Ken Holtzman, P, 1972–75
- Mark Holzemer, P, 1998–99
- Rick Honeycutt, P, 1987–93, 1995
- Alex Hooks, IF, 1935
- Bob Hooper, P, 1950–52
- Leon Hooten, P, 1974
- Sam Hope, P, 1907
- Don Hopkins, DH, 1975–76
- Joe Horlen, P, 1972
- Vince Horsman, P, 1992–94
- Willie Horton, OF, 1978
- Tim Hosley, C, 1973–74, 1976–81
- Gene Host, P, 1957
- Byron Houck, P, 1912–14
- Frank House, C, 1958–59
- Ben Houser, IF, 1910
- Steve Hovley, OF, 1970–71
- Steve Howard, OF, 1990
- Jay Howell, P, 1985–87
- Dann Howitt, OF, 1989–92
- Dick Howser, IF, 1961–63
- Tex Hoyle, P, 1952
- **Waite Hoyt**, P, 1931
- Glenn Hubbard, IF, 1988–89
- Earl Huckleberry, P, 1935
- Dave Hudgens, IF, 1983
- Tim Hudson, P, 1999–2004
- Luke Hughes, IF, 2012
- Hank Hulvey, P, 1923
- Nick Hundley, C, 2019
- **Catfish Hunter**, P, 1965–74
- Billy Hunter, IF, 1957–58
- Carl Husta, IF, 1925
- Bert Husting, P, 1902
- Warren Huston, IF, 1937

== I ==
- Brandon Inge, IF, 2012
- Cole Irvin, P, 2021–22
- Jason Isringhausen, P, 1999–2001
- Akinori Iwamura, IF, 2010

== J ==
- Ray Jablonski, IF, 1959–60
- Conor Jackson, OF/IF, 2010–11
- Drew Jackson, OF, 2022
- Edwin Jackson, P, 2018
- Joe Jackson, OF, 1908–09
- **Reggie Jackson**, OF, 1967–75, 1987
- Zach Jackson, P, 2022–23
- Spook Jacobs, IF, 1954–56
- Baby Doll Jacobson, OF, 1927
- Brook Jacoby, IF, 1991
- John Jaha, IF, 1999–2001
- Justin James, P, 2010
- Charlie Jamieson, OF, 1917–18
- Kevin Jarvis, P, 1999
- John Jaso, C, 2013–14
- Stan Javier, OF, 1986–90, 1994–95
- Daulton Jefferies, P, 2020–22
- Tom Jenkins, OF, 1926
- Doug Jennings, OF, 1988–91
- Robin Jennings, OF, 2001
- Willie Jensen, P, 1914
- D'Angelo Jiménez, IF, 2006
- Dany Jiménez, P, 2022–24
- Manny Jiménez, OF, 1962–66
- Miguel Jimenez, P, 1993–94
- Tommy John, P, 1985
- Doug Johns, P, 1995–96, 2000
- Bill Johnson, OF, 1916–17
- Bob Johnson, OF, 1933–42
- Bob Johnson, IF, 1960, 1969–70
- Cliff Johnson, DH, 1981–82
- Dan Johnson, IF, 2005–08
- Dane Johnson, P, 1997
- Ellis Johnson, P, 1917
- Deron Johnson, IF, 1961–62, 1973–74
- Hank Johnson, P, 1936
- Jim Johnson, P 2014
- Jing Johnson, P, 1916–17, 1919, 1927–28
- John Henry Johnson, P, 1978–79
- Ken Johnson, P, 1958–61
- Mark Johnson, C, 2003
- Paul Johnson, OF, 1920–21
- Rankin Johnson, P, 1941
- Roy Johnson, P, 1918
- Stan Johnson, OF, 1961
- Doc Johnston, IF, 1922
- Jay Johnstone, OF, 1973
- John Johnstone, P, 1997
- Doug Jones, P, 1999–2000
- Jeff Jones, P, 1980–84
- John Jones, OF, 1923–32
- Gordon Jones, P, 1962
- Marcus Jones, P, 2000
- Eddie Joost, IF, 1947–54
- Mike Jorgensen, IF, 1977
- Félix José, OF, 1988–90
- Corban Joseph, 2B, 2019
- Rick Joseph, IF, 1964
- Bob Joyce, P, 1939
- Dick Joyce, P, 1965
- Matt Joyce, OF, 2017–18
- Hayden Juenger, P, 2026-Present
- Gage Jump, P, 2026-Present
- Janson Junk, P, 2024
- Ed Jurak, IF, 1988
- David Justice, OF, 2002

== K ==
- Kila Ka'aihue, IF, 2012
- Jeff Kaiser, P, 1985
- Bill Kalfass, P, 1937
- James Kaprielian, P, 2020–23
- Eric Karros, IF, 2004
- Steve Karsay, P, 1993–94, 1997, 2006
- Scott Kazmir, P, 2014–15
- Bob Kearney, C, 1981–83
- Teddy Kearns, IF, 1920
- Dave Keefe, P, 1917–21
- Ed Keegan, P, 1961
- Vic Keen, P, 1918
- Jim Keesey, IF, 1925–30
- Randy Keisler, P, 2006
- Skeeter Kell, IF, 1952
- **George Kell**, IF, 1943–46
- Al Kellett, P, 1923
- Harry Kelley, P, 1936–38
- Shawn Kelley, P, 2018
- Alex Kellner, P, 1948–58
- Walt Kellner, P, 1952–53
- Al Kellogg, P, 1908
- Bill Kelly, IF, 1920
- Michael Kelly, P, 2024-present
- Ren Kelly, P, 1923
- Tony Kemp, 2B, 2020–23
- Jason Kendall, C, 2005–07
- Ed Kenna, P, 1902
- Adam Kennedy, IF, 2009
- Joe Kennedy, P, 2005–07
- Matt Keough, P, 1977–83
- Joe Keough, OF, 1968
- Gus Keriazakos, P, 1955
- Bill Kern, OF, 1962
- Fred Ketcham, OF, 1901
- Gus Ketchum, P, 1922
- Steve Kiefer, IF, 1984–85
- Bobby Kielty, OF, 2004–07
- Dean Kiekhefer, P, 2018
- Leo Kiely, P, 1960
- Mark Kiger, IF, 2006
- Brad Kilby, P, 2009–10
- Mike Kilkenny, P, 1972
- Evans Killeen, P, 1959
- Lee King, OF, 1916
- Mike Kingery, OF, 1992
- Brian Kingman, P, 1979–82
- Dave Kingman, OF, 1984–86
- Dennis Kinney, P, 1982
- Walt Kinney, P, 1919–23
- Mike Kircher, P, 1919
- Bill Kirk, P, 1961
- Tom Kirk, PH, 1947
- Ernie Kish, OF, 1945
- Lou Klein, IF, 1951
- Will Klein, P, 2024
- Ed Klieman, P, 1950
- Lou Klimchock, IF, 1958–61
- Ron Klimkowski, P, 1971
- Bob Kline, P, 1934
- Joe Klink, P, 1990–91
- Mickey Klutts, IF, 1979–82
- Lou Knerr, P, 1945–46
- Austin Knickerbocker, OF, 1947
- Bill Knickerbocker, IF, 1942
- John Knight, IF, 1905–07
- Jack Knott, P, 1941–46
- Darold Knowles, P, 1971–74
- Tom Knowlson, P, 1915
- Bill Knowlton, P, 1920
- Billy Koch, P, 2002
- Jared Koenig, P, 2022
- Adam Kolarek, P, 2021–22
- Don Kolloway, IF, 1953
- Shane Komine, P, 2006–07
- Brad Komminsk, OF, 1991
- Bruce Konopka, IF, 1942–46
- Graham Koonce, IF, 2003
- Larry Kopf, IF, 1914–15
- Merlin Kopp, OF, 1918–19
- Mark Kotsay, OF, 2004–07
- George Kottaras, C, 2012
- Kevin Kouzmanoff, IF, 2010–11
- Pete Kozma, SS, 2021
- Harry Krause, P, 1908–12
- Lew Krausse, P, 1931–32
- Lew Krausse Jr., P, 1961–69
- Danny Kravitz, C, 1960
- Mike Kreevich, OF, 1942
- Lou Kretlow, P, 1956
- Matt Krook, P, 2025
- Bill Krueger, P, 1983–86
- Bill Krueger, P, 1987
- Dick Kryhoski, IF, 1955
- Ted Kubiak, IF, 1967–69, 1972–75
- Tim Kubinski, P, 1997, 1999
- Johnny Kucab, P, 1950–52
- Johnny Kucks, P, 1959–60
- Bert Kuczynski, P, 1943
- John Kull, P, 1909
- Mike Kume, P, 1955
- Bill Kunkel, P, 1961–62
- Joshua Kuroda-Grauer, SS, 2026–Present
- Nick Kurtz, 1B, 2025–Present
- Marty Kutyna, P, 1959–60

== L ==
- **Tony La Russa**, IF, 1963, 1968–71
- Tommy La Stella, 2B, 2020
- Chet Laabs, OF, 1947
- Bob Lacey, P, 1977–80
- Marcel Lachemann, P, 1969–71
- Rene Lachemann, C, 1965–66, 1968
- William Lackey, P, 1890
- Tyler Ladendorf, 2B, 2015–16
- Ed Lagger, P, 1934
- **Nap Lajoie**, IF, 1901–02, 1915–16
- Jake Lamb, 3B, 2020
- Andrew Lambo, OF, 2016
- Bill Lamar, OF, 1924–27
- Ryan LaMarre, OF, 2017
- Dennis Lamp, P, 1987
- Bill Landis, P, 1963
- Jim Landis, OF, 1965
- Ryan Langerhans, OF, 2007
- Shea Langeliers, C, 2022–Present
- Rick Langford, P, 1977–86
- Red Lanning, OF, 1916
- Carney Lansford, IF, 1983–92
- Jack Lapp, C, 1908–15
- Jeff Larish, IF/OF, 2010
- Ed Larkin, C, 1909
- Andy LaRoche, IF, 2011
- Don Larsen, P, 1960–61
- **Tommy Lasorda**, P, 1956
- Charley Lau, C, 1963–64
- Billy Lauder, IF, 1901
- Ramón Laureano, OF, 2018–23
- George Lauzerique, P, 1967–69
- Doc Lavan, IF, 1913
- Ryan Lavarnway, C, 2017
- Gary Lavelle, P, 1987
- Vance Law, IF, 1991
- Brett Lawrie, 3B, 2015
- Otis Lawry, IF, 1916–17
- Brett Laxton, P, 1999–2000
- Tom Leahy, C, 1901
- Fred Lear, IF, 1915
- Bevo LeBourveau, OF, 1929
- Jose Leclerc, P, 2025
- Paul Lehner, OF, 1950–51
- Justin Lehr, P, 2004
- Dave Leiper, P, 1984–87, 1994–95
- Dummy Leitner, P, 1901
- Johnnie LeMaster, IF, 1987
- Jake Lemoine, P, 2022
- Patrick Lennon, OF, 1996–97
- Ed Lennox, IF, 1906
- Arnold Leon, P, 2015
- Elmer Leonard, P, 1911
- John Leovich, C, 1941
- Brian Lesher, OF, 1996–98
- Jon Lester, P, 2014
- Allan Lewis, OF, 1967–73
- Colby Lewis, P, 2007
- Darren Lewis, OF, 1990
- Richie Lewis, P, 1997
- Cory Lidle, P, 2001–02
- Dutch Lieber, P, 1935–36
- Glenn Liebhardt, P, 1930
- Bill Lillard, IF, 1939–40
- Ted Lilly, P, 2002–03
- Lou Limmer, IF, 1951–54
- Paul Lindblad, P, 1965–71, 1973–76
- Josh Lindblom, P, 2014
- Bob Lindemann, OF, 1901
- Axel Lindstrom, P, 1916
- Larry Lintz, IF, 1976–77
- Hod Lisenbee, P, 1936
- Jack Littrell, IF, 1952–55
- Paddy Livingston, C, 1909–11
- Esteban Loaiza, P, 2006–07
- Harry Lochhead, IF, 1901
- Bob Locker, P, 1970–72
- Skip Lockwood, P, 1965
- Dario Lodigiani, IF, 1938–40
- Zach Logue, P, 2022
- Lep Long, P, 1911
- Sam Long, P, 2023
- Terrence Long, OF, 1999–2003
- Pete Loos, P, 1901
- Christian Lopes, OF, 2022
- Davey Lopes, IF, 1982–84
- Héctor López, OF, 1955–59
- Jacob Lopez, P, 2025-present
- Bris Lord, OF, 1905–07, 1910–12
- Andrew Lorraine, P, 1997
- Richard Lovelady, P, 2023
- Pete Lovrich, P, 1963
- Jed Lowrie, IF, 2013–14, 2016–18, 2021–22
- Sam Lowry, P, 1942–43
- Hal Luby, IF, 1936
- Easton Lucas, P, 2023–24
- Josh Lucas, P, 2018
- Jonathan Lucroy, C, 2018
- Eric Ludwick, P, 1997
- Larry Luebbers, P, 2002
- Ruddy Lugo, P, 2007
- Jerry Lumpe, IF, 1959–63
- Jesús Luzardo, P, 2019–21
- Scott Lydy, OF, 1993
- Rick Lysander, P, 1980

== M ==
- Duke Maas, P, 1958
- John Mabry, OF, 2002
- Mike Macfarlane, C, 1998–99
- Vimael Machín, 3B, 2020–22
- Willie MacIver, C, 2025
- Earle Mack, IF, 1910–14
- Shane Mack, OF, 1998
- Eric Mackenzie, C, 1955
- Gordon Mackenzie, C, 1961
- Felix Mackiewicz, OF, 1941–43
- David MacKinnon, 1B, 2022
- John Mackinson, P, 1953
- Ed Madjeski, C, 1932–34
- Ryan Madson, P, 2016–17
- Dave Magadan, IF, 1997–98
- Harl Maggert, OF, 1912
- Mike Magnante, P, 2000–02
- Trystan Magnuson, P, 2011
- Roy Mahaffey, P, 1930–35
- Ron Mahay, P, 1999–2000
- Al Mahon, P, 1930
- Emil Mailho, OF, 1936
- Jim Mains, P, 1943
- Hank Majeski, IF, 1946–49, 1951–52
- Anthony Maldonado, P, 2025
- Ben Mallonee, OF, 1921
- Sheldon Mallory, OF, 1977
- Lew Malone, IF, 1915–16
- Sean Manaea, P, 2016–21
- Ángel Mangual, OF, 1971–76
- Fred Manrique, IF, 1991
- Frank Manush, IF, 1908
- Phil Marchildon, P, 1940–49
- Johnny Marcum, P, 1933–35
- Roger Maris, OF, 1958–59
- Parker Markel, P, 2022
- Gene Markland, IF, 1950
- Gonzalo Márquez, IF, 1972–73
- Jay Marshall, P, 2007, 2009
- Starling Marte, OF, 2021
- Billy Martin, IF, 1957
- Cody Martin, P, 2015
- Doc Martin, P, 1908–12
- Morrie Martin, P, 1951–54
- Pat Martin, P, 1919–20
- Adrian Martinez, P, 2022–23
- Hector Martinez, OF, 1962–63
- Marty Martínez, IF, 1972
- Ted Martínez, IF, 1975
- Nick Martini, OF, 2018–19
- Wedo Martini, P, 1935
- Bob Martyn, OF, 1957–59
- Damon Mashore, OF, 1996–97
- Walt Masters, P, 1939
- Len Matarazzo, P, 1952
- Joe Mathes, IF, 1912
- Nelson Mathews, OF, 1964–65
- T. J. Mathews, P, 1997–2001
- Francisco Matos, IF, 1994
- Hideki Matsui, DH, 2011–
- Wid Matthews, OF, 1923
- Cloy Mattox, C, 1929
- Harry Matuzak, P, 1934–36
- Carmen Mauro, OF, 1953
- Dal Maxvill, IF, 1972–75
- Bert Maxwell, P, 1908
- Bruce Maxwell, C, 2016–18
- Trevor May, P, 2023
- Brent Mayne, C, 1997
- Eddie Mayo, IF, 1943
- Vin Mazzaro, P, 2009–10
- Wickey McAvoy, C, 1913–19
- Matt McBride, C, 2016
- Bill McCahan, P, 1946–49
- Emmett McCann, IF, 1920–21
- Kyle McCann, C, 2024
- Brandon McCarthy, P, 2011–12
- David McCarty, IF, 2003
- Steve McCatty, P, 1977–85
- Sam McConnell, IF, 1915
- Barney McCosky, OF, 1946–51
- **Willie McCovey**, IF, 1976
- Benny McCoy, IF, 1940–41
- Les McCrabb, P, 1939–50
- Frank McCue, IF, 1922
- Mickey McDermott, P, 1957, 1961
- Danny McDevitt, P, 1962
- Hank McDonald, P, 1931–33
- Jason McDonald, OF, 1997–2000
- Mickey McDonald, OF, 2022
- Lee McElwee, IF, 1916
- TJ McFarland, P, 2020, 2024–25
- Willie McGee, OF, 1990
- Connie McGeehan, P, 1903
- Bill McGhee, IF, 1944–45
- Ed McGhee, OF, 1953–54
- John McGillen, P, 1944
- Scott McGough, P, 2025
- Beauty McGowan, OF, 1922–23
- Mark McGwire, IF, 1986–97
- Stuffy McInnis, IF, 1909–17
- Matty McIntyre, OF, 1901
- Cody McKay, C, 2002
- Dave McKay, IF, 1980–82
- David McKay, P, 2022
- Tim McKeithan, P, 1932–34
- Bob McKinney, IF, 1901
- Billy McKinney, OF, 2022
- Rich McKinney, IF, 1973–77
- Denny McLain, P, 1972
- Bo McLaughlin, P, 1981–82
- Pat McLaughlin, P, 1940
- Mark McLemore, IF, 2004
- Jack McMahan, P, 1956
- Jim McManus, IF, 1960
- Greg McMichael, P, 1999–2000
- Billy McMillon, OF, 2001, 2003–04
- Ken McMullen, IF, 1976
- Eric McNair, IF, 1929–35, 1942
- Bob McNamara, IF, 1939
- Rusty McNealy, DH, 1983
- Bill McNulty, OF, 1969–72
- Jeff McNeil, UT, 2026-Present
- John McPherson, P, 1901
- Jerry McQuaig, OF, 1934
- George McQuinn, IF, 1946
- Jim Mecir, P, 2000–04
- Doc Medich, P, 1977
- Luis Medina, P, 2023–24
- Bill Meehan, P, 1915
- Roy Meeker, P, 1923–24
- Adam Melhuse, C, 2003–06
- Kevin Melillo, IF, 2007
- Joe Mellana, IF, 1927
- Jon Meloan, P, 2009
- Dave Melton, OF, 1956–58
- Frank Menechino, IF, 1999–2004
- Daniel Mengden, P, 2016–20
- Orlando Mercado, C, 1988
- Henry Mercedes, C, 1992–93
- Charlie Metro, OF, 1944–45
- Alex Metzler, OF, 1926
- Bob Meyer, P, 1964
- Billy Meyer, C, 1916–17
- Dan Meyer, IF, 1982–85
- Dan Meyer, P, 2006–07
- Russ Meyer, P, 1959
- Scott Meyer, C, 1978
- Cass Michaels, IF, 1952–53
- Carl Miles, P, 1940
- Dee Miles, OF, 1939–42
- Bing Miller, OF, 1922–26, 1928–34
- Damian Miller, C, 2004
- Jai Miller, OF, 2011
- Jim Miller, P, 2012
- Mason Miller, P, 2023–25
- Rudy Miller, IF, 1929
- Billy Milligan, P, 1901
- Bill Mills, C, 1944
- Brad Mills, P, 2014, 2015
- Tommy Milone, P, 2012–14
- Don Mincher, IF, 1970–72
- Ray Miner, P, 1921
- Craig Minetto, P, 1978–81
- Mike Minor, P, 2020
- Craig Mitchell, P, 1975–77
- Fred Mitchell, P, 1902
- Kevin Mitchell, OF, 1998
- Paul Mitchell, P, 1976–77
- Ralph Mitterling, OF, 1916
- Mike Mohler, P, 1993–98
- Izzy Molina, C, 1996–98
- Sam Moll, P, 2017, 2021–23
- Rinty Monahan, P, 1953
- Rick Monday, OF, 1966–71
- Nate Mondou, 2B, 2022
- Frankie Montas, P, 2017–22
- Aurelio Monteagudo, P, 1963–66
- Steve Montgomery, P, 1996–97
- Luke Montz, C, 2013
- Bill Mooneyham, P, 1986
- Jimmy Moore, OF, 1930–31
- Kelvin Moore, IF, 1981–83
- Kerwin Moore, OF, 1996
- Ferdie Moore, IF, 1914
- Mike Moore, P, 1989–92
- Roy Moore, P, 1920–22
- José Morales, DH, 1973
- Kendrys Morales, 1B/DH/P, 2019
- Luis Morales, P, 2025-present
- Herbie Moran, OF, 1908
- Mitch Moreland, 1B/DH, 2021
- Dave Morey, P, 1913
- Cy Morgan, P, 1909–12
- **Joe Morgan**, IF, 1984
- Joe Morgan, IF, 1959
- Mike Morgan, P, 1978–79
- Tom Morgan, P, 1957
- Doyt Morris, OF, 1937
- Bill Morrisette, P, 1915–16
- Bud Morse, IF, 1929
- Clay Mortensen, P, 2009–10
- Wally Moses, OF, 1935–41, 1949–51
- Walter Moser, P, 1906
- Guillermo Moscoso, P, 2011
- Brandon Moss, IF/OF, 2012–14
- Charlie Moss, C, 1934–36
- Don Mossi, P, 1965
- Edward Mujica, P, 2015
- Mark Mulder, P, 2000–04
- Jim Mullen, IF, 1904
- Kyle Muller, P, 2023–24
- Jake Munch, OF, 1918
- Max Muncy, 1B, 2015–16
- Max Muncy, SS, 2025–Present
- Eric Munson, C, 2009
- Pedro Muñoz, OF, 1996
- Steve Mura, P, 1985
- Noah Murdock, P, 2025
- Danny Murphy, IF, 1902–13
- Donnie Murphy, IF, 2007–08
- Dwayne Murphy, OF, 1978–87
- Eddie Murphy, OF, 1912–15
- Mike Murphy, C, 1916
- Morgan Murphy, C, 1901
- Sean Murphy, C, 2019–22
- Joe Murray, P, 1950
- Larry Murray, OF, 1977–79
- Ray Murray, C, 1951–53
- Matt Murton, OF, 2008
- Glenn Myatt, C, 1920–21
- Elmer Myers, P, 1915–18
- Greg Myers, C, 2001–02
- Joseph Myers, P, 1905

== N ==
- Jack Nabors, P, 1915–17
- Bill Nagel, IF, 1939
- Pete Naktenis, P, 1936
- Jim Nash, P, 1966–69
- Rollie Naylor, P, 1917–24
- Zach Neal, 2016–17, 2023
- Troy Neel, DH, 1992–94
- Mike Neill, OF, 1998–99
- Gene Nelson, P, 1987–92
- Lynn Nelson, P, 1937–39
- Rob Nelson, IF, 1986–87
- Pat Neshek, P, 2012–13
- Jim Nettles, OF, 1981
- Mike Neu, P, 2003
- Sheldon Neuse, IF, 2019, 2022
- Tyler Nevin, IF, 2024
- Sean Newcomb, P, 2023–24, 2025
- Jeff Newman, C, 1976–82
- Bobo Newsom, P, 1944–46, 1952–53
- Skeeter Newsome, IF, 1935–39
- Simon Nicholls, IF, 1906–09
- Bill Nicholson, OF, 1936
- Al Niemiec, IF, 1936
- Vinny Nittoli, P, 2024
- Junior Noboa, IF, 1994
- Ryan Noda, IF, 2023–24
- Sean Nolin, P, 2015
- Pete Noonan, C, 1904
- Jordan Norberto, P, 2011–12
- Irv Noren, OF, 1957
- Fred Norman, P, 1962–63
- Derek Norris, C, 2012–14
- Mike Norris, P, 1975–90
- Billy North, OF, 1973–78
- Joe Nossek, OF, 1966–67, 1969
- Win Noyes, P, 1917, 1919
- Eduarniel Núñez, P, 2025-present
- Edwin Núñez, P, 1993–94
- Renato Núñez, OF, 2016–17
- Joe Nuxhall, P, 1961

== O ==
- Charlie O'Brien, C, 1985
- John O'Donoghue, P, 1963–65
- Eric O'Flaherty, P, 2014–15
- Jack O'Loughlin, P, 2024
- Harry O'Neill, P, 1922–23
- Harry O'Neill, C, 1939
- Blue Moon Odom, P, 1964–75
- Curly Ogden, P, 1922–24
- Jim Oglesby, IF, 1936
- Hideki Okajima, P, 2013
- Rube Oldring, OF, 1906–18
- Omar Olivares, P, 1999–2001
- Adam Oller, P, 2022–23
- Matt Olson, IF, 2016–21
- Steve Ontiveros, P, 1985–88, 1994–95
- Mike Oquist, P, 1997–99
- Nate Orf, SS, 2020
- Billy Orr, IF, 1913–14
- José Ortiz, IF, 2000–01
- Roberto Ortiz, OF, 1950
- Ossie Orwoll, P, 1928–29
- Dan Osinski, P, 1962
- Darrell Osteen, P, 1970
- Bill Oster, P, 1954
- Michel Otañez, P, 2024–25
- Dan Otero, P, 2013–15
- Dave Otto, P, 1987–90
- Josh Outman, P, 2008–09, 2011
- Dillon Overton, P, 2016
- Bob Owchinko, P, 1981–82
- Jack Owens, C, 1935
- Doc Ozmer, P, 1923

== P ==
- Cristian Pache, OF, 2022
- Emilio Pagán, P, 2018
- Mitchell Page, DH, 1977–83
- Sam Page, P, 1939
- Jim Pagliaroni, C, 1968–69
- **Satchel Paige**, P, 1965
- Eddie Palmer, IF, 1917
- Joe Palmisano, C, 1931
- Jim Panther, P, 1971
- Craig Paquette, IF, 1993–95
- Tony Parisse, C, 1943–44
- Ace Parker, IF, 1937–38
- Dave Parker, OF, 1988–89
- Jarrod Parker, P, 2012–13
- Roy Parmelee, P, 1939
- Rube Parnham, P, 1916–17
- Jeff Parrett, P, 1992
- Andy Parrino, IF, 2013–15
- Bill Parsons, P, 1974
- Joe Pate, P, 1926–27
- Daryl Patterson, P, 1971
- Eric Patterson, OF/IF, 2008–10
- Mike Patterson, OF, 1981
- Bill Patton, C, 1935
- Spencer Patton, P, 2023
- Joel Payamps, P, 2022
- Jay Payton, OF, 2005–06
- Hal Peck, OF, 1944–46
- Jack Peerson, IF, 1935–36
- Carlos Peña, IF, 2002
- Orlando Peña, P, 1962–65
- Roberto Peña, IF, 1970
- Cliff Pennington, IF, 2008–12
- **Herb Pennock**, P, 1912–15
- Bob Pepper, P, 1915
- Ángel Perdomo, P, 2025
- Jhonny Pereda, C, 2025
- Antonio Pérez, IF, 2006
- Carlos Pérez, C, 2023
- Francisco Pérez, P, 2023
- Marty Perez, IF, 1977–78
- Charlie Perkins, P, 1930
- Cy Perkins, C, 1915–30
- Jack Perkins, P, 2025-Present
- Jim Perry, P, 1975
- Scott Perry, P, 1918–21
- Rick Peters, OF, 1983–86
- Rusty Peters, IF, 1936–38
- Jace Peterson, OF, 2023
- Jim Peterson, P, 1931–33
- Shane Peterson, 1B, 2013
- Gregorio Petit, 2B, 2008–09
- Yusmeiro Petit, P, 2018–21
- Monte Pfeffer, IF, 1913
- Dan Pfister, P, 1961–64
- Josh Phegley, C, 2015–19
- Ken Phelps, DH, 1989–90
- Dave Philley, OF, 1951–53
- Tony Phillips, OF, 1982–89, 1999
- Steve Phoenix, P, 1994–95
- Adam Piatt, OF, 2000–03
- Wiley Piatt, P, 1901
- **Mike Piazza**, DH, 2007
- Rob Picciolo, SS, 1977–82, 1985
- Val Picinich, C, 1916–17
- Charlie Pick, 3B, 1916
- Ollie Pickering, CF, 1903–04
- Tony Pierce, P, 1967–68
- William Pierson, P, 1918–19, 1924
- Joe Pignatano, C, 1961
- Al Pilarcik, OF, 1956, 1961
- Squiz Pillion, P, 1915
- Horacio Piña, P, 1973
- Manny Piña, C, 2023
- Chad Pinder, UT, 2016–22
- Ed Pinnance, P, 1903
- Cotton Pippen, P, 1939
- Stephen Piscotty, OF, 2019–22
- Jim Pisoni, OF, 1956–57
- Gaylen Pitts, 3B, 1974–75
- Juan Pizarro, P, 1969
- **Eddie Plank**, P, 1901–14
- Phil Plantier, LF, 1996
- Don Plarski, CF, 1955
- Rance Pless, 1B, 1956
- Trevor Plouffe, 3B, 2017
- Eric Plunk, P, 1986–89
- Luis Polonia, LF, 1987–89
- Drew Pomeranz, P, 2014–15
- Jim Poole, IF, 1925–27
- Ray Poole, PH, 1941, 1947
- Bo Porter, OF, 2000
- Odie Porter, P, 1902
- Arnie Portocarrero, P, 1954–57
- Leo Posada, OF, 1960–62
- Nels Potter, P, 1938–41, 1948
- Boog Powell, OF, 2017–18
- Landon Powell, C, 2009–11
- Vic Power, 1B, 1954–58
- Doc Powers, C, 1901–09
- Ike Powers, P, 1927–28
- Bobby Prescott, LF, 1961
- Jason Pridie, OF, 2015
- Ariel Prieto, P, 1995–98, 2000
- Jurickson Profar, 2B, 2019
- Jim Pruett, C, 1944–45
- Austin Pruitt, P, 2022–23
- George Puccinelli, RF, 1936
- A.J. Puk, P, 2019, 2021–22
- Nick Punto, IF/OF, 2014
- David Purcey, P, 2011
- Danny Putnam, OF, 2007

== Q ==
- Jack Quinn, P, 1925–30
- Tad Quinn, P, 1902–03
- Luis Quiñones, IF, 1983
- Jamie Quirk, C, 1989–92

== R ==
- Mike Raczka, P, 1992
- Hal Raether, P, 1954, 1957
- **Tim Raines**, OF, 1999
- Chuck Rainey, P, 1984
- Ed Rakow, P, 1961–63
- Edwar Ramírez, P, 2010
- Carlos Ramirez, P, 2018
- Milt Ramírez, IF, 1979
- Willie Randolph, IF, 1990
- Vic Raschi, P, 1955
- Morrie Rath, IF, 1909–10
- Jon Ratliff, P, 2000
- Carl Ray, P, 1915–16
- Randy Ready, IF, 1992
- Britt Reames, P, 2005
- Anthony Recker, C, 2011–12
- Josh Reddick, OF, 2012–16
- Mark Redman, P, 2004
- Howie Reed, P, 1958–60
- Chad Reineke, P, 2009
- Al Reiss, IF, 1932
- Jim Reninger, P, 1938–39
- Steve Renko, P, 1978
- Bill Renna, OF, 1954–56
- Roger Repoz, OF, 1966–67
- Chris Resop, P, 2013
- Otto Rettig, P, 1922
- Todd Revenig, P, 1992
- Dave Revering, IF, 1978–81
- Carlos Reyes, P, 1994–97
- Gerardo Reyes, P, 2024
- Tommie Reynolds, OF, 1963–65, 1969
- Arthur Rhodes, P, 2004
- Gordon Rhodes, P, 1936
- Paul Richards, C, 1935
- Jack Richardson, P, 1915–16
- Ken Richardson, IF, 1942
- Don Richmond, IF, 1941–47
- Harry Riconda, IF, 1923–24
- Brad Rigby, P, 1997–99
- Dave Righetti, P, 1994
- José Rijo, P, 1985–87
- Ernest Riles, IF, 1991
- Ricardo Rincón, P, 2002–05
- Bob Rinker, C, 1950
- Yacksel Ríos, P, 2023
- Jimmy Ripple, OF, 1943
- Jim Rivera, OF, 1961
- Tanner Roark, P, 2019
- Bip Roberts, IF, 1998
- Ray Roberts, P, 1919
- Connor Robertson, P, 2007
- Jim Robertson, C, 1954–55
- Sherry Robertson, OF, 1952
- Bruce Robinson, C, 1978
- Eddie Robinson, IF, 1953, 1956
- Floyd Robinson, OF, 1968
- Ben Rochefort, IF, 1914
- Fernando Rodriguez, P, 2014–16
- Henry Rodríguez, P, 2009–10
- Rick Rodriguez, P, 1986–87
- Roberto Rodriquez, P, 1967, 1970
- Fernando Rodney, P, 2018–19
- Oscar Roettger, IF, 1932
- Tom Rogers, P, 1919
- Kenny Rogers, P, 1997–99
- Jim Roland, P, 1969–72
- Dutch Romberger, P, 1954
- Eddie Rommel, P, 1920–32
- Sergio Romo, P, 2021
- Matt Roney, P, 2006
- Phil Roof, C, 1966–69
- Brent Rooker, OF, 2023–Present
- Adam Rosales, IF, 2010–13, 2017
- Buddy Rosar, C, 1945–49
- Santiago Rosario, IF, 1965
- Mike Rose, C, 2004
- Larry Rosenthal, OF, 1944–45
- Buck Ross, P, 1936–41
- Cody Ross, OF, 2015
- Tyson Ross, P, 2010–12
- Braggo Roth, OF, 1919
- Jack Rothrock, OF, 1937
- Mike Rouse, IF, 2006
- Harland Rowe, IF, 1916
- Chuck Rowland, C, 1923
- Emil Roy, P, 1933
- Dick Rozek, P, 1953–54
- Al Rubeling, IF, 1940–41
- Drew Rucinski, P, 2023
- Joe Rudi, OF, 1967–76, 1982
- Esteury Ruiz, OF, 2023–24
- Norge Ruiz, P, 2022
- Joe Rullo, IF, 1943–44
- Jeff Russell, P, 1992
- Lefty Russell, P, 1910–12
- Mickey Rutner, IF, 1947
- Rob Ryan, OF, 2001
- Marc Rzepczynski, P, 2016

== S ==
- Kirk Saarloos, P, 2004–06, 2008
- Olmedo Sáenz, IF, 1999–2002
- Tom Saffell, OF, 1955
- Johnny Sain, P, 1955
- Lenn Sakata, IF, 1986
- Roger Salmon, P, 1912
- Gus Salve, P, 1908
- Jeff Samardzija, P, 2014
- Ed Samcoff, IF, 1951
- Alejandro Sánchez, OF, 1987
- John Sanders, PH, 1965
- Ken Sanders, P, 1964, 1966, 1968
- Scott Sanderson, P, 1990
- Charlie Sands, DH, 1975
- Tommy Sandt, IF, 1975–76
- Jack Sanford, P, 1967
- Manny Sanguillén, C, 1977
- F. P. Santangelo, OF, 2001
- José Santiago, P, 1956
- José Santiago, P, 1963–65
- Scott Sauerbeck, P, 2006
- Rusty Saunders, OF, 1927
- Rich Sauveur, P, 1999–2000
- Bob Savage, P, 1942–48
- Joe Savery, P, 2014
- Steve Sax, IF, 1994
- Jeff Schaefer, IF, 1994
- Wally Schang, C, 1913–17, 1930
- Rube Schauer, P, 1917
- Heinie Scheer, IF, 1922–23
- Carl Scheib, P, 1943–54
- Jim Schelle, P, 1939
- Red Schillings, P, 1922
- Brian Schlitter, P, 2019
- Biff Schlitzer, P, 1908–09
- Ossee Schreckengost, C, 1902–08
- Steve Schrenk, P, 2000
- Max Schuemann, IF, 2024–Present
- Hack Schumann, P, 1906
- Patrick Schuster, P, 2016
- Randy Schwartz, IF, 1965–66
- Frank Schwindel, 1B, 2021
- Jerry Schypinski, IF, 1955
- Dick Scott, IF, 1989
- Rodney Scott, IF, 1977
- Tayler Scott, P, 2023
- Evan Scribner, P, 2012–15
- Marco Scutaro, IF, 2004–07
- JP Sears, P, 2022–25
- Diego Seguí, P, 1962–65, 1967–68, 1970–72
- Socks Seibold, P, 1915–19
- Kevin Seitzer, IF, 1993
- Sam Selman, P, 2022
- Marcus Semien, IF, 2015–2020
- Scott Service, P, 2000
- Luis Severino, P, 2025–Present
- Jimmy Sexton, IF, 1981–82
- Socks Seybold, OF, 1901–08
- Art Shamsky, OF, 1972
- Bill Shanner, P, 1920
- Red Shannon, IF, 1917–21
- Billy Shantz, C, 1954–55
- Bobby Shantz, P, 1949–56
- Ralph Sharman, OF, 1917
- Shag Shaughnessy, OF, 1908
- Jeff Shaver, P, 1988
- Bob Shaw, P, 1961
- Don Shaw, P, 1972
- Bob Shawkey, P, 1913–15
- Red Shea, P, 1918
- Dave Shean, IF, 1906
- Tom Sheehan, P, 1915–16
- Ben Sheets, P, 2010
- Rollie Sheldon, P, 1965–66
- Scott Sheldon, IF, 1997
- Ed Sherling, PH, 1924
- Joe Sherman, P, 1915
- Tex Shirley, P, 1941–42
- Charlie Shoemaker, IF, 1961–64
- Bill Shores, P, 1928–31
- Eric Show, P, 1991
- Norm Siebern, IF, 1960–63
- Sonny Siebert, P, 1975
- Dick Siebert, IF, 1938–45
- Rubén Sierra, OF, 1992–95
- Frank Sigafoos, IF, 1926
- Al Sima, P, 1954
- **Al Simmons**, OF, 1924–32, 1940–41, 1944, HOF
- Harry Simpson, OF, 1955–59
- Matt Sinatro, C, 1987–88
- Chris Singleton, OF, 2003
- Scott Sizemore, IF, 2011–13
- Frank Skaff, IF, 1943
- Lou Skizas, OF, 1956–57
- John Slappey, P, 1920
- **Enos Slaughter**, OF, 1955–56
- Lou Sleater, P, 1955
- Joe Slusarski, P, 1991–93
- Aaron Small, P, 1996–98
- Jim Small, OF, 1958
- Burch Smith, P, 2021
- Chad Smith, P, 2023
- Chris Smith, P, 2016–17
- Dave Smith, P, 1938–39
- Eddie Smith, P, 1936–39
- Greg Smith, P, 2008
- Hal Smith, C, 1956–59
- Harry Smith, C, 1901
- Josh Smith, P, 2017
- Kevin Smith, 3B, 2022–23
- Mark Smith, P, 1983
- Mayo Smith, OF, 1945
- Red Smith, IF, 1925
- Seth Smith, OF, 2012–13
- Syd Smith, C, 1908
- Roger Smithberg, P, 1993–94
- Jake Smolinski, OF, 2015–18
- Kirby Snead, P, 2022–23
- Chris Snelling, OF, 2007
- Brian Snyder, P, 1989
- Bernie Snyder, IF, 1935
- Russ Snyder, OF, 1959–60
- Tyler Soderstrom, 1B, 2023–Present
- Eric Sogard, IF, 2010–16
- Lary Sorensen, P, 1984
- Joakim Soria, P, 2019–20
- Elías Sosa, P, 1978
- Geovany Soto, C, 2014
- Mark Souza, P, 1980
- Steve Sparks, P, 2003
- **Tris Speaker**, OF, 1928
- Mitch Spence, P, 2024–Present
- Jim Spencer, IF, 1981–82
- Stan Sperry, IF, 1938
- Bob Spicer, P, 1955–56
- Scott Spiezio, IF, 1996–99
- Ed Sprague, P, 1968–69
- Ed Sprague, IF, 1998–99
- Russ Springer, P, 2009
- Jeffrey Springs, P, 2025-present
- Bill Stafford, P, 1966–67
- Steve Staggs, IF, 1978
- Larry Stahl, OF, 1964–66
- Tuck Stainback, OF, 1946
- Matt Stairs, OF, 1996–2000
- Gerry Staley, P, 1961
- George Staller, OF, 1943
- Fred Stanley, IF, 1981–82
- Mike Stanley, C, 2000
- Farmer Steelman, C, 1901–02
- Michael Stefanic, P, 2026-present
- Blake Stein, P, 1998–99
- Irv Stein, P, 1932
- Terry Steinbach, C, 1986–96
- Bill Stellbauer, OF, 1916
- Gene Stephens, OF, 1961–62
- Justin Sterner, P, 2025-present
- Cal Stevenson, OF, 2022
- Bill Stewart, OF, 1955
- Dave Stewart, P, 1986–92, 1995
- Shannon Stewart, OF, 2007
- Wes Stock, P, 1964–67
- Art Stokes, P, 1925
- Ron Stone, OF, 1966
- Todd Stottlemyre, P, 1995–96
- Dan Straily, P, 2012–14
- Paul Strand, OF, 1924
- Huston Street, P, 2005–08
- Ross Stripling, P, 2024
- Amos Strunk, OF, 1908–17, 1919–20, 1924
- Tom Sturdivant, P, 1959, 1963–64
- Dean Sturgis, C, 1914
- Lena Styles, C, 1919–21
- José Suárez, P, 2026-Present
- Ken Suarez, C, 1966–67
- Pete Suder, IF, 1941–55
- Jim Sullivan, P, 1921–22
- Haywood Sullivan, C, 1961–63
- Homer Summa, OF, 1929–30
- Champ Summers, OF, 1974
- Eric Surkamp, P, 2016
- **Don Sutton**, P, 1985
- Larry Sutton, OF, 2002
- Kurt Suzuki, C, 2006–13
- Dale Sveum, IF, 1993
- Buck Sweeney, OF, 1914
- Mike Sweeney, DH, 2008
- Ryan Sweeney, OF, 2008–11
- Devin Sweet, P, 2023
- Bob Swift, C, 1942–43
- Nick Swisher, OF, 2004–07

== T ==
- Jerry Tabb, IF, 1977–78
- John Taff, P, 1913
- Fred Talbot, P, 1965–66, 1969–70
- Tim Talton, C, 1966–67
- Jeff Tam, P, 1999–2002
- Freddy Tarnok, P, 2023
- Danny Tartabull, OF, 1995
- Jose Tartabull, OF, 1962–66
- Arlas Taylor, P, 1921
- Beau Taylor, C, 2018–19
- Billy Taylor, P, 1994–99
- Harry Taylor, P, 1957
- Joe Taylor, OF, 1954
- Michael Taylor, OF, 2011–13
- Miguel Tejada, IF, 1997–2003
- Dave Telgheder, P, 1996–98
- Tom Tellmann, P, 1985
- Gene Tenace, C, 1969–76
- Ralph Terry, P, 1957–59, 1966
- Wayne Terwilliger, IF, 1959–60
- Mickey Tettleton, C, 1984–87
- Dave Thies, P, 1963
- Bud Thomas, P, 1937–39
- Charles Thomas, OF, 2005
- Cody Thomas, OF, 2022–2023
- Colby Thomas. OF, 2025-Present
- Fred Thomas, IF, 1919–20
- **Frank Thomas**, DH, 2006, 2008
- Ira Thomas, C, 1909–15
- Kite Thomas, OF, 1952–53
- Gary Thomasson, OF, 1978
- Harry Thompson, P, 1919
- Kevin Thompson, OF, 2007
- Rich Thompson, P, 2012
- Shag Thompson, OF, 1914–16
- Tim Thompson, C, 1956–57
- Trayce Thompson, OF, 2018
- Buck Thrasher, OF, 1916–17
- Marv Throneberry, IF, 1960–61
- Rusty Tillman, OF, 1986
- Eric Tipton, OF, 1939–41
- Joe Tipton, C, 1950–52
- Pat Tobin, P, 1941
- Jim Todd, P, 1975–76, 1979
- Phil Todt, IF, 1931
- Steven Tolleson, IF, 2010
- Dick Tomanek, P, 1958–59
- Andy Tomberlin, OF, 1995
- Brett Tomko, P, 2009
- Ka'ai Tom, OF, 2021
- Abraham Toro, IF, 2024
- Ron Tompkins, P, 1965
- Rupe Toppin, P, 1962
- Pablo Torrealba, P, 1977
- Mike Torrez, P, 1976–77, 1984
- César Tovar, OF, 1975–76
- Blake Treinen, P, 2017–19
- Bob Trice, P, 1953–55
- Andrew Triggs, P, 2016–18
- Manny Trillo, IF, 1973–74
- Lou Trivino, P, 2018–2022
- Bob Trowbridge, P, 1960
- Virgil Trucks, P, 1957–58
- John Tsitouris, P, 1958–60
- George Turbeville, P, 1935–37
- Terry Turner, IF, 1919
- Tink Turner, P, 1915
- Bill Tuttle, OF, 1958–61
- Jim Tyack, OF, 1943
- Jim Tyrone, OF, 1977

== U ==
- Jim Umbarger, P, 1977
- Tom Underwood, P, 1981–83
- Woody Upchurch, P, 1935–36
- Bill Upton, P, 1954
- Jack Urban, P, 1957–58
- Luis Urias, 3B, 2025
- Gio Urshela, 2B, 2025

== V ==
- César Valdez, P, 2017
- Mario Valdez, IF, 2000–01
- Danny Valencia, 3B, 2015–16
- Elmer Valo, OF, 1940–54, 1955–56
- Ozzie Van Brabant, P, 1954–55
- Todd Van Poppel, P, 1991, 1993–96
- Porter Vaughan, P, 1940–46
- Roy Vaughn, P, 1934
- Al Veach, P, 1935
- Jorge Velandia, IF, 1998–2000
- Randy Velarde, IF, 1999–2000, 2002
- Mike Venafro, P, 2002
- Pat Venditte, P, 2015
- Rube Vickers, P, 1907–09
- Ozzie Virgil, Sr., IF, 1961
- Luis Vizcaíno, P, 1999–2001
- Stephen Vogt, IF/OF, 2013–17, 2022
- Jack Voigt, OF, 1998
- Dave Von Ohlen, P, 1986–87
- Ed Vosberg, P, 1994
- Bill Voss, OF, 1972

== W ==
- **Rube Waddell**, P, 1902–07
- Tyler Wade, UT, 2023
- Hal Wagner, C, 1937–44
- Mark Wagner, IF, 1984
- Neil Wagner, P, 2011
- Bobby Wahl, P, 2017
- Kermit Wahl, IF, 1950–51
- Rube Walberg, P, 1923–33
- Ken Waldichuk, P, 2022–23
- Frank Walker, OF, 1920–21
- Jerry Walker, P, 1961–62
- Johnny Walker, IF, 1919–21
- Tilly Walker, OF, 1918–23
- Todd Walker, IF, 2007
- Tom Walker, P, 1902
- Jack Wallaesa, IF, 1940–46
- Denny Walling, IF, 1975–76
- Joe Wallis, OF, 1978–79
- Jimmy Walsh, OF, 1912–16
- Bruce Walton, P, 1991–92
- Bill Wambsganss, IF, 1926
- Wei-Chung Wang, P, 2019
- Preston Ward, IF, 1958–59
- Mike Warren, P, 1983–85
- Rabbit Warstler, IF, 1934–36
- John Wasdin, P, 1995–96
- Claudell Washington, OF, 1974–76
- Herb Washington, DH, 1974–75
- Gary Waslewski, P, 1972
- Spenser Watkins, P, 2023
- Neal Watlington, C, 1953
- Matt Watson, OF, 2005, 2010
- Mule Watson, P, 1918–19
- Harry Weaver, P, 1915–16
- Skeeter Webb, IF, 1948
- Ray Webster, 1B, 1967–69, 1971
- Jemile Weeks, IF, 2011–13
- Jordan Weems, P, 2020–21
- Walt Weiss, IF, 1987–92
- Johnny Welaj, OF, 1943
- Bob Welch, P, 1988–94
- Frank Welch, OF, 1919–26
- Bob Wellman, OF, 1948–50
- Casper Wells, OF, 2013
- J.B. Wendelken, P, 2016–21
- Joey Wendle, 2B, 2016–17
- Don Wengert, P, 1995–97
- Billy Werber, IF, 1937–38
- Buzz Wetzel, P, 1927
- Lee Wheat, P, 1954–55
- **Zack Wheat**, OF, 1927
- Woody Wheaton, OF, 1943–44
- Don White, OF, 1948–49
- Jo-Jo White, OF, 1943–44
- Tommy White, 1B/3B, 2026-Present
- Walt Whittaker, P, 1916
- Dave Wickersham, P, 1960–63
- Collin Wiles, P, 2022
- Spider Wilhelm, IF, 1953
- Marc Wilkins, P, 2000
- Bobby Wilkins, IF, 1944–45
- Jerry Willard, C, 1986–87
- Al Williams, P, 1937–38
- Alika Williams, SS/2B, 2026-Present
- **Billy Williams**, OF, 1975–76
- Dib Williams, IF, 1930–35
- **Dick Williams**, OF, 1959–60
- Don Williams, P, 1962
- Earl Williams, C, 1977
- George Williams, IF, 1964
- George Williams, C, 1995–97
- Mark Williams, OF, 1977
- Marsh Williams, P, 1916
- Josh Willingham, OF, 2011
- Dale Willis, P, 1963
- Lefty Willis, P, 1925–27
- Whitey Wilshere, P, 1934–36
- Bill Wilson, OF, 1954–55
- Highball Wilson, P, 1902
- Jack Wilson, P, 1934
- Jacob Wilson, 2B, 2021
- Jacob Wilson, SS, 2024–Present
- Jim Wilson, P, 1949
- Tom Wilson, C, 2001
- Willie Wilson, OF, 1991–92
- Snake Wiltse, P, 1901–02
- Gordie Windhorn, OF, 1962
- Jason Windsor, P, 2006
- Al Wingo, OF, 1919
- Ed Wingo, C, 1920
- Hank Winston, P, 1933
- Alan Wirth, P, 1978–80
- Jay Witasick, P, 1996–98, 2005–06
- Ron Witmeyer, IF, 1991
- Bobby Witt, P, 1992–94
- Whitey Witt, OF, 1916–21
- Steve Wojciechowski, P, 1995–97
- John Wojcik, OF, 1962–64
- Lefty Wolf, P, 1921
- Ross Wolf, P, 2010
- Chuck Wolfe, P, 1923
- Roger Wolff, P, 1941–43
- Dooley Womack, P, 1970
- Alex Wood, P, 2024
- Doc Wood, IF, 1923
- Jason Wood, IF, 1998
- Mike Wood, P, 2003
- Darrell Woodard, IF, 1978
- Gary Woods, OF, 1976
- Fred Worden, P, 1914
- Tim Worrell, P, 1998–99
- Rich Wortham, P, 1983
- Ed Wright, P, 1952
- Taffy Wright, OF, 1949
- Michael Wuertz, P, 2009–11
- John Wyatt, P, 1961–66, 1969
- Weldon Wyckoff, P, 1913–16
- Austin Wynns, C, 2025-present
- Hank Wyse, P, 1950–51

== Y ==
- Keiichi Yabu, P, 2005
- George Yankowski, C, 1942
- Rube Yarrison, P, 1922
- Carroll Yerkes, P, 1927–29
- Lefty York, P, 1919
- Rudy York, IF, 1948
- Elmer Yoter, IF, 1921
- Chris Young, OF, 2013
- Curt Young, P, 1983–91, 1993
- Ernie Young, OF, 1994–97
- Matt Young, P, 1989
- Ralph Young, IF, 1922
- Eddie Yount, OF, 1937

== Z ==
- Tom Zachary, P, 1918
- Joe Zapustas, OF, 1933
- Gus Zernial, OF, 1951–57
- Brad Ziegler, P, 2008–11
- Jimmy Zinn, P, 1919
- Barry Zito, P, 2000–06, 2015
- Ben Zobrist, 2B, 2015
- Sam Zoldak, P, 1951–52
