= 1935 Philadelphia Athletics season =

1935 Philadelphia Athletics
- League: American League
- Ballpark: Shibe Park
- City: Philadelphia
- Record: 58–91 (.389)
- League place: 8th
- Owners: Connie Mack, Tom Shibe and John Shibe
- Managers: Connie Mack

The 1935 Philadelphia Athletics season involved the A's finishing eighth in the American League with a record of 58 wins and 91 losses.

Before 1935, 20th Street residents could see games for free over the 12-foot right-field fence of Shibe Park and fans could see the laundry lines on the roofs of 20th Street houses. Connie Mack lost a lawsuit to prevent this, so he built the high right-field 'spite' fence.

== Regular season ==
=== Season standings ===
American League
Team	W	L	Pct.	GB	Home	Road
Detroit Tigers	93	58	.616	—	53‍–‍25	40‍–‍33
New York Yankees	89	60	.597	3	41‍–‍33	48‍–‍27
Cleveland Indians	82	71	.536	12	48‍–‍29	34‍–‍42
Boston Red Sox	78	75	.510	16	41‍–‍37	37‍–‍38
Chicago White Sox	74	78	.487	19½	42‍–‍34	32‍–‍44
Washington Senators	67	86	.438	27	37‍–‍39	30‍–‍47
St. Louis Browns	65	87	.428	28½	31‍–‍44	34‍–‍43
Philadelphia Athletics	58	91	.389	34	30‍–‍42	28‍–‍49

=== Record vs. opponents ===
1935 American League record Sources:
Team	BOS	CWS	CLE	DET	NYY	PHA	SLB	WSH
Boston	—	13–9	9–13–1	9–13	9–12	16–6	10–12	12–10
Chicago	9–13	—	10–12	11–11	9–11	12–10	11–11–1	12–10
Cleveland	13–9–1	12–10	—	7–15–1	8–14	12–10	15–6–1	15–7
Detroit	13–9	11–11	15–7–1	—	11–11	14–5	17–5	12–10
New York	12–9	11–9	14–8	11–11	—	14–6	12–10	15–7
Philadelphia	6–16	10–12	10–12	5–14	6–14	—	11–11	10–12
St. Louis	12–10	11–11–1	6–15–1	5–17	10–12	11–11	—	10–11–1
Washington	10–12	10–12	7–15	10–12	7–15	12–10	11–10–1	—

=== Roster ===
1935 Philadelphia Athletics
Roster
Pitchers: 21 Al Benton; 41 George Blaeholder; 11 Sugar Cain; 20 Joe Cascarella; 15 George Caster; 14 Bill Dietrich; 15 Carl Doyle; 20 Vallie Eaves; -- Bill Ferrazzi; -- Herman Fink; 24 Earl Huckleberry; 16 Dutch Lieber; 17 Roy Mahaffey; 12 Johnny Marcum; 20 Wedo Martini; 18 George Turbeville; 9 Woody Upchurch; -- Al Veach; 24 Whitey Wilshere	Catchers: 10 Charlie Berry; -- Bill Conroy; 27 Charlie Moss; -- Jack Owens; -- Bill Patton; 27 Paul Richards; Infielders: 2 Jimmie Foxx; 5 Pinky Higgins; 3 Alex Hooks; 6 Eric McNair; 28 Skeeter Newsome; -- Jack Peerson; -- Bernie Snyder; 22 Rabbit Warstler; 4 Dib Williams	Outfielders: 9 Ed Coleman; 8 Doc Cramer; 23 Lou Finney; 7 Bob Johnson; 19 Wally Moses	Manager: Connie Mack; Coaches: 31 Lena Blackburne; 30 Earle Mack

== Player stats ==
= Indicates team leader

= Indicates league leader

=== Batting ===
==== Starters by position ====
Note: Pos = Position; G = Games played; AB = At bats; H = Hits; Avg. = Batting average; HR = Home runs; RBI = Runs batted in

Pos	Player	G	AB	H	Avg.	HR	RBI
C	Paul Richards	85	257	63	.245	4	29
1B	Jimmie Foxx	147	535	185	.346	36*	115
2B	Rabbit Warstler	138	496	124	.250	3	59
3B	Pinky Higgins	133	524	155	.296	23	94
SS	Eric McNair	137	526	142	.270	4	57
OF	Doc Cramer	149	644	214	.332	3	70
OF	Bob Johnson	147	582	174	.299	28	109
OF	Wally Moses	85	345	112	.325	5	35

*Tied with Hank Greenberg (Detroit)

==== Other batters ====
Note: G = Games played; AB = At bats; H = Hits; Avg. = Batting average; HR = Home runs; RBI = Runs batted in

Player	G	AB	H	Avg.	HR	RBI
Lou Finney	109	410	112	.273	0	31
Charlie Berry	62	190	48	.253	3	29
Skeeter Newsome	59	145	30	.207	1	10
Alex Hooks	15	44	10	.227	0	4
Bernie Snyder	10	32	11	.344	0	3
Jack Peerson	10	19	6	.316	0	1
Ed Coleman	10	13	1	.077	0	0
Bill Patton	9	10	3	.300	0	2
Dib Williams	4	10	1	.100	0	0
Jack Owens	2	8	2	.250	0	1
Bill Conroy	1	4	1	.250	0	0
Charlie Moss	4	3	1	.333	0	1

=== Pitching ===
==== Starting pitchers ====
Note: G = Games pitched; IP = Innings pitched; W = Wins; L = Losses; ERA = Earned run average; SO = Strikeouts

Player	G	IP	W	L	ERA	SO
Johnny Marcum	39	242.2	17	12	4.08	99
George Blaeholder	23	149.0	6	10	3.99	22
Sugar Cain	6	26.0	0	5	6.58	5
Woody Upchurch	3	21.1	0	2	5.06	2
Vallie Eaves	3	14.0	1	2	5.14	6
Al Veach	2	10.0	0	2	11.70	3
Earl Huckleberry	1	6.2	1	0	9.45	2

==== Other pitchers ====
Note: G = Games pitched; IP = Innings pitched; W = Wins; L = Losses; ERA = Earned run average; SO = Strikeouts

Player	G	IP	W	L	ERA	SO
Bill Dietrich	43	185.1	7	13	5.39	59
Whitey Wilshere	27	142.1	9	9	4.05	80
Roy Mahaffey	27	136.0	8	4	3.90	39
Carl Doyle	14	79.2	2	7	5.99	34
Al Benton	27	78.1	3	4	7.70	42
George Turbeville	19	63.2	0	3	7.63	20
Joe Cascarella	9	32.1	1	6	5.29	15
Herman Fink	5	15.2	0	3	9.19	2
Bill Ferrazzi	3	7.0	1	2	5.14	0
Wedo Martini	3	6.1	0	2	17.05	1

==== Relief pitchers ====
Note: G = Games pitched; W = Wins; L = Losses; SV = Saves; ERA = Earned run average; SO = Strikeouts

Player	G	W	L	SV	ERA	SO
George Caster	25	1	4	1	6.25	24
Dutch Lieber	18	1	1	2	3.09	14

== Farm system ==
Level	Team	League	Manager
A	Williamsport Grays	New York–Pennsylvania League	Mike McNally
B	Richmond Colts	Piedmont League	Eddie Rommel
