= 1936 Philadelphia Athletics season =

1936 Philadelphia Athletics
- League: American League
- Ballpark: Shibe Park
- City: Philadelphia
- Record: 53–100 (.346)
- League place: 8th
- Owners: Connie Mack and John Shibe
- Managers: Connie Mack
- Radio: WCAU (Bill Dyer); WIP (Dolly Stark)

The 1936 Philadelphia Athletics season involved the A's finishing eighth in the American League with a record of 53 wins and 100 losses.

== Offseason ==
Tom Shibe, eldest son of former owner Ben Shibe, died on February 16, 1936. Connie Mack supported Tom's brother, John Shibe, as club president, and he was named to the position on February 24.

=== Notable transactions ===
- December 10, 1935: Jimmie Foxx and Johnny Marcum were traded by the Athletics to the Boston Red Sox for Gordon Rhodes, George Savino (minors), and $150,000.

== Regular season ==
In August, John Shibe was forced to step down from his position as acting club president.

=== Season standings ===
American League
| Team | W | L | Pct. | GB | Home | Road |
|---|---|---|---|---|---|---|
| New York Yankees | 102 | 51 | .667 | — | 56‍–‍21 | 46‍–‍30 |
| Detroit Tigers | 83 | 71 | .539 | 19½ | 44‍–‍33 | 39‍–‍38 |
| Washington Senators | 82 | 71 | .536 | 20 | 42‍–‍35 | 40‍–‍36 |
| Chicago White Sox | 81 | 70 | .536 | 20 | 43‍–‍32 | 38‍–‍38 |
| Cleveland Indians | 80 | 74 | .519 | 22½ | 49‍–‍30 | 31‍–‍44 |
| Boston Red Sox | 74 | 80 | .481 | 28½ | 47‍–‍29 | 27‍–‍51 |
| St. Louis Browns | 57 | 95 | .375 | 44½ | 31‍–‍43 | 26‍–‍52 |
| Philadelphia Athletics | 53 | 100 | .346 | 49 | 31‍–‍46 | 22‍–‍54 |

=== Record vs. opponents ===
1936 American League record Sources:
| Team | BOS | CWS | CLE | DET | NYY | PHA | SLB | WSH |
|---|---|---|---|---|---|---|---|---|
| Boston | — | 12–10 | 9–13 | 13–9 | 15–7–1 | 13–9 | 12–10 | 8–14 |
| Chicago | 10–12 | — | 12–10–1 | 8–14 | 7–14 | 15–7 | 13–8–1 | 16–5 |
| Cleveland | 13–9 | 10–12–1 | — | 9–13 | 6–16–1 | 13–9 | 15–7–1 | 14–8 |
| Detroit | 9–13 | 14–8 | 13–9 | — | 8–14 | 17–5 | 11–11 | 11–11 |
| New York | 15–7–1 | 14–7 | 16–6–1 | 14–8 | — | 16–6 | 14–8 | 13–9 |
| Philadelphia | 9–13 | 7–15 | 9–13 | 5–17 | 6–16 | — | 11–10–1 | 6–16 |
| St. Louis | 10–12 | 8–13–1 | 7–15–1 | 11–11 | 8–14 | 10–11–1 | — | 3–19 |
| Washington | 14–8 | 5–16 | 8–14 | 11–11 | 9–13 | 16–16 | 19–3 | — |

=== Roster ===
1936 Philadelphia Athletics
Roster
| Pitchers: 3 Fred Archer; 16 Red Bullock; 14 Bill Dietrich; 18 Carl Doyle; 22 Herman Fink; 46 Stu Flythe; 14,20 Randy Gumpert; -- Hank Johnson; 19 Harry Kelley; -- Dutch Lieber; 29 Hod Lisenbee; 37 Harry Matuzak; 15 Pete Naktenis; 11 Gordon Rhodes; 17 Buck Ross; -- Eddie Smith; 20 George Turbeville; 21 Woody Upchurch; 24 Whitey Wilshere | Catchers: 10 Charlie Berry; 25 Bill Conroy; 2 Frankie Hayes; 12 Charlie Moss; Infielders: 45 Dick Culler; 28 Chubby Dean; 23 Lou Finney; 5 Pinky Higgins; 27 Hugh Luby; 6 Skeeter Newsome; 27 Al Niemiec; 3 Jim Oglesby; 45 Jack Peerson; 24,29 Rusty Peters; 4 Rabbit Warstler | Outfielders: 7 Bob Johnson; 26 Emil Mailho; 9 Wally Moses; 21 Bill Nicholson; 8 George Puccinelli | Manager: Connie Mack; Coaches: 10 Charlie Berry; -- Lena Blackburne; -- Earle Mack |

== Player stats ==
| = Indicates team leader |

=== Batting ===
==== Starters by position ====
Note: Pos = Position; G = Games played; AB = At bats; H = Hits; Avg. = Batting average; HR = Home runs; RBI = Runs batted in

| Pos | Player | G | AB | H | Avg. | HR | RBI |
|---|---|---|---|---|---|---|---|
| C | Frankie Hayes | 144 | 507 | 137 | .271 | 10 | 67 |
| 1B | Lou Finney | 151 | 653 | 197 | .302 | 1 | 41 |
| 2B | Rabbit Warstler | 66 | 236 | 59 | .250 | 1 | 24 |
| SS | Skeeter Newsome | 127 | 471 | 106 | .225 | 0 | 46 |
| 3B | Pinky Higgins | 146 | 550 | 159 | .289 | 12 | 80 |
| OF | Wally Moses | 146 | 585 | 202 | .345 | 7 | 66 |
| OF | George Puccinelli | 135 | 457 | 127 | .278 | 11 | 78 |
| OF | Bob Johnson | 153 | 566 | 165 | .292 | 25 | 121 |

==== Other batters ====
Note: G = Games played; AB = At bats; H = Hits; Avg. = Batting average; HR = Home runs; RBI = Runs batted in

| Player | G | AB | H | Avg. | HR | RBI |
|---|---|---|---|---|---|---|
| Chubby Dean | 111 | 342 | 98 | .287 | 1 | 48 |
| Al Niemiec | 69 | 203 | 40 | .197 | 1 | 20 |
| Rusty Peters | 45 | 119 | 26 | .218 | 3 | 16 |
| Charlie Moss | 33 | 44 | 11 | .250 | 0 | 10 |
| Dick Culler | 9 | 38 | 9 | .237 | 0 | 1 |
| Hal Luby | 9 | 38 | 7 | .184 | 0 | 3 |
| Jack Peerson | 8 | 34 | 11 | .324 | 0 | 5 |
| Emil Mailho | 21 | 18 | 1 | .056 | 0 | 0 |
| Charlie Berry | 13 | 17 | 1 | .059 | 0 | 1 |
| Bill Nicholson | 11 | 12 | 0 | .000 | 0 | 0 |
| Jim Oglesby | 3 | 11 | 2 | .182 | 0 | 2 |
| Bill Conroy | 1 | 2 | 1 | .500 | 0 | 0 |

=== Pitching ===
| = Indicates league leader |

==== Starting pitchers ====
Note: G = Games pitched; IP = Innings pitched; W = Wins; L = Losses; ERA = Earned run average; SO = Strikeouts

| Player | G | IP | W | L | ERA | SO |
|---|---|---|---|---|---|---|
| Harry Kelley | 35 | 235.1 | 15 | 12 | 3.86 | 82 |
| Gordon Rhodes | 35 | 216.1 | 9 | 20 | 5.74 | 61 |
| Buck Ross | 30 | 200.2 | 9 | 14 | 5.83 | 47 |
| Herman Fink | 34 | 188.2 | 8 | 16 | 5.39 | 53 |
| Carl Doyle | 8 | 38.2 | 0 | 3 | 10.94 | 12 |
| Fred Archer | 6 | 36.2 | 2 | 3 | 6.38 | 9 |
| Eddie Smith | 2 | 19.0 | 1 | 1 | 1.89 | 7 |
| Hank Johnson | 3 | 11.2 | 0 | 2 | 7.71 | 6 |

==== Other pitchers ====
Note: G = Games pitched; IP = Innings pitched; W = Wins; L = Losses; ERA = Earned run average; SO = Strikeouts

| Player | G | IP | W | L | ERA | SO |
|---|---|---|---|---|---|---|
| Hod Lisenbee | 19 | 85.2 | 1 | 7 | 6.20 | 17 |
| George Turbeville | 12 | 43.2 | 2 | 5 | 6.39 | 10 |
| Woody Upchurch | 7 | 22.1 | 0 | 2 | 9.67 | 6 |
| Pete Naktenis | 7 | 18.2 | 0 | 1 | 12.54 | 18 |
| Whitey Wilshere | 5 | 18.1 | 1 | 2 | 6.87 | 4 |
| Red Bullock | 12 | 16.2 | 0 | 2 | 14.04 | 7 |
| Harry Matuzak | 6 | 15.0 | 0 | 1 | 7.20 | 8 |

==== Relief pitchers ====
Note: G = Games pitched; W = Wins; L = Losses; SV = Saves; ERA = Earned run average; SO = Strikeouts

| Player | G | W | L | SV | ERA | SO |
|---|---|---|---|---|---|---|
| Randy Gumpert | 22 | 1 | 2 | 2 | 4.76 | 9 |
| Bill Dietrich | 21 | 4 | 6 | 3 | 6.53 | 34 |
| Stu Flythe | 17 | 0 | 0 | 0 | 13.04 | 14 |
| Dutch Lieber | 3 | 0 | 1 | 0 | 7.71 | 1 |

== Farm system ==
| Level | Team | League | Manager |
|---|---|---|---|
| A | Williamsport Grays | New York–Pennsylvania League | Mike McNally |
| B | Columbia Senators | Sally League | Josh Billings and Blackie Carter |
| C | Cleveland A's | Cotton States League | Slim Brewer and Mays Copeland |
| D | Moultrie Packers | Georgia–Florida League | Grant Gillis |
