= Turbeville (surname) =

The surname Turbeville a derivation of the original de' Turberville derives from Old French Thouberville, ville meaning town, place or residence (from Latin villa). The first part may derive from Ancient Greek turb 'turmoil' or a Germanic word for turf, although others suggest that it relates to the Norse god Thor.

The Turbeville name was brought to England during the Norman French invasion of 1066. It is the surname of:

- William de Turbeville (c. 1095 – 1174), English Bishop of Norwich
- Deborah Turbeville (1932 – 2013), American fashion photographer
- George Turbeville (1914 – 1983), American Major League Baseball pitcher
- Sir Henry de Turbeville (died 1239), English soldier and seneschal of Gascony

== See also ==
- Tess of the d'Urbervilles, novel by Thomas Hardy
- Turbeville, South Carolina, named for Michael Turbeville and his family
