= Maylene, Alabama =

- Unincorporated community
- Location within Alabama Location within the United States
- Coordinates: 33°12′12″N 86°51′42″W
- Country: United States
- State: Alabama
- County: Shelby
- Elevation: 492 ft (150 m)
- Time zone: UTC−6 (Central (CST))
  - Summer (DST): UTC−5 (CDT)
- ZIP code: 35114
- Area codes: 205, 659
- GNIS feature ID: 122423

Maylene was an unincorporated community in Shelby County, Alabama, United States. While the community was once unincorporated, it is now part of southern Alabaster. Maylene has a post office with ZIP code 35114. One site in Maylene, the Meredith-McLaughlin House (McLaughlin Farm), is listed on the Alabama Register of Landmarks and Heritage.

== Notable people ==
- Dave Mader III, stock car racing driver
- Al Veach, former pitcher for the Philadelphia Athletics
