= Red Bullock =

American baseball player (1911-1988)

- Pitcher
- Born: October 12, 1911; Biloxi, Mississippi, U.S.
- Died: June 27, 1988 (aged 76); Pascagoula, Mississippi, U.S.
- Batted: Left Threw: Left

MLB debut
- May 19, 1936, for the Philadelphia Athletics

Last MLB appearance
- September 6, 1936, for the Philadelphia Athletics

MLB statistics
- Win–loss record: 0–2
- Earned run average: 14.04
- Strikeouts: 7
- Stats at Baseball Reference

Teams
- Philadelphia Athletics (1936)

Malton Joseph Bullock Sr. (October 12, 1911 – June 27, 1988) was a pitcher in Major League Baseball who played for the Philadelphia Athletics during the 1936 season. Standing at 6 ft 1 in (1.85 m) and weighing 192 lb, Bullock was a left-handed batter and thrower.

In his two-season career, Bullock achieved a 0–2 record with a 14.04 ERA in 12 appearances, including two starts. He gave up 32 runs (six unearned) on 19 hits and 37 walks, while striking out seven in 16 2/3 innings of work.

== See also ==
- 1936 Philadelphia Athletics season
