= Woody Upchurch =

American baseball player

- Pitcher
- Born: April 13, 1911; Buies Creek, North Carolina, U.S.
- Died: October 23, 1971 (aged 60); Buies Creek, North Carolina, U.S.
- Batted: Right Threw: Left

MLB debut
- September 14, 1935, for the Philadelphia Athletics

Last MLB appearance
- May 24, 1936, for the Philadelphia Athletics

MLB statistics
- Win–loss record: 0–4
- Earned run average: 7.42
- Strikeouts: 8
- Stats at Baseball Reference

Teams
- Philadelphia Athletics (1935–1936)

Jefferson Woodrow Upchurch (April 13, 1911 – October 23, 1971) was an American Major League Baseball pitcher who played for parts of two seasons. He pitched for the Philadelphia Athletics for three games during 1935 and seven games during 1936. Upchurch played college baseball at Campbell University.
