= Pete Naktenis =

American baseball player (1914–2007)

- Pitcher
- Born: June 12, 1914; Aberdeen, Washington, U.S.
- Died: August 1, 2007 (aged 93); Singer Island, Florida, U.S.
- Batted: Left Threw: Left

MLB debut
- June 13, 1936, for the Philadelphia Athletics

Last MLB appearance
- May 14, 1939, for the Cincinnati Reds

MLB statistics
- Win–loss record: 0–1
- Earned run average: 10.72
- Strikeouts: 19
- Stats at Baseball Reference

Teams
- Philadelphia Athletics (1936); Cincinnati Reds (1939)

Peter Ernest Naktenis (June 12, 1914 – August 1, 2007) was an American pitcher in Major League Baseball who played for the Philadelphia Athletics (1936) and Cincinnati Reds (1939). Listed at 6 feet 1 inch (1.85 m), 185 pounds (84 kg), Naktenis batted and threw left-handed. He was born in Aberdeen, Washington.

In a two-season career, Naktenis posted a 0–1 record with 19 strikeouts and a 10.72 ERA in 10 games pitched.

An alumnus of Duke University, Naktenis died in Singer Island, Florida, at the age of 93. At the time of his death, he was recognized as one of the oldest living MLB players.
