= Emil Mailho =

American baseball player (1908-2007)

- Left fielder
- Born: December 16, 1908; Berkeley, California, U.S.
- Died: March 7, 2007 (aged 98); Castro Valley, California, U.S.
- Batted: Right Threw: Right

MLB debut
- April 14, 1936, for the Philadelphia Athletics

Last MLB appearance
- June 4, 1936, for the Philadelphia Athletics

MLB statistics
- Batting average: .056
- Home runs: 0
- Runs batted in: 0
- Stats at Baseball Reference

Teams
- Philadelphia Athletics (1936)

Emil Pierre Mailho (December 16, 1908 – March 7, 2007) was an American professional baseball player. He played part of one season in Major League Baseball in 1936 for the Philadelphia Athletics. He was born in Berkeley, California, and died in Castro Valley, California. Between mid-1931 and 1936, Mailho played for the Oakland Oaks in the Pacific Coast League, hitting over .300 each year, except for an injury shortened 1934 season.

When called up by the Athletics, Mailho was mostly used as a left-handed pinch hitter by manager Connie Mack, although he appeared in one game as an outfielder.

After his stint with the Athletics, Mailho joined the Atlanta Crackers of the Southern Association for the rest of the 1936 season, hitting .315. Between 1937 and 1941, Mailho never hit below .298 in a season. Mailho returned to the Pacific Coast League, playing for the Oakland Oaks in 1942 to 1944, and the San Francisco Seals in 1945. Mailho ended his professional career with the Oklahoma City Indians of the Texas League in 1946, playing 55 games and hitting .226.

At the time of his death, at 98, Mailho was recognized as the fourth-oldest living former major league ballplayer.
