= Roy Mahaffey =

American baseball player (1904–1969)

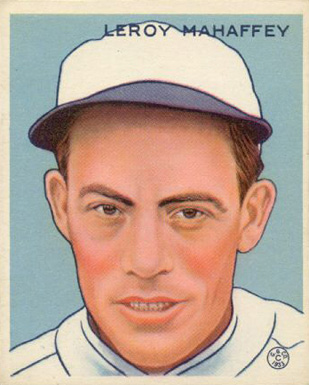
- Roy Mahaffey 1933 Goudey baseball card
- Pitcher
- Born: February 9, 1904; Belton, South Carolina, U.S.
- Died: July 23, 1969 (aged 65); Anderson, South Carolina, U.S.
- Batted: Right Threw: Right

MLB debut
- August 31, 1926, for the Pittsburgh Pirates

Last MLB appearance
- July 28, 1936, for the St. Louis Browns

MLB statistics
- Win–loss record: 67–49
- Earned run average: 5.01
- Strikeouts: 365
- Stats at Baseball Reference

Teams
- Pittsburgh Pirates (1926–1927); Philadelphia Athletics (1930–1935); St. Louis Browns (1936)

Lee Roy Mahaffey (February 9, 1904 – July 23, 1969) was a pitcher in Major League Baseball. He played for the Pittsburgh Pirates, Philadelphia Athletics, and St. Louis Browns. His key pitch was a fast-breaking curveball.

In nine seasons, Mahaffey posted a 67-49 record with a 5.01 earned run average in 1,056 innings pitched with 365 strikeouts.

As a hitter, Mahaffey posted a .184 batting average (73-for-396) with 28 runs, 4 home runs and 33 RBI in 224 games pitched.
