= Chubby Dean =

American baseball player (1915–1970)

- Pitcher / First baseman
- Born: August 24, 1915; Mount Airy, North Carolina, U.S.
- Died: December 21, 1970 (aged 55); Riverside, New Jersey, U.S.
- Batted: Left Threw: Left

MLB debut
- April 14, 1936, for the Philadelphia Athletics

Last MLB appearance
- September 5, 1943, for the Cleveland Indians

MLB statistics
- Win–loss record: 30–46
- Earned run average: 5.08
- Batting average: .274
- Stats at Baseball Reference

Teams
- Philadelphia Athletics (1936–1941); Cleveland Indians (1941–1943)

Alfred Lovell Dean (August 24, 1915 – December 21, 1970) was a Major League Baseball pitcher and first baseman. He played for the Philadelphia Athletics from 1936 to 1941 and the Cleveland Indians from 1941 to 1943. From 1943 to 1946 Dean served in the military during World War II.
