= Jim Oglesby =

American baseball player (1905-1955)

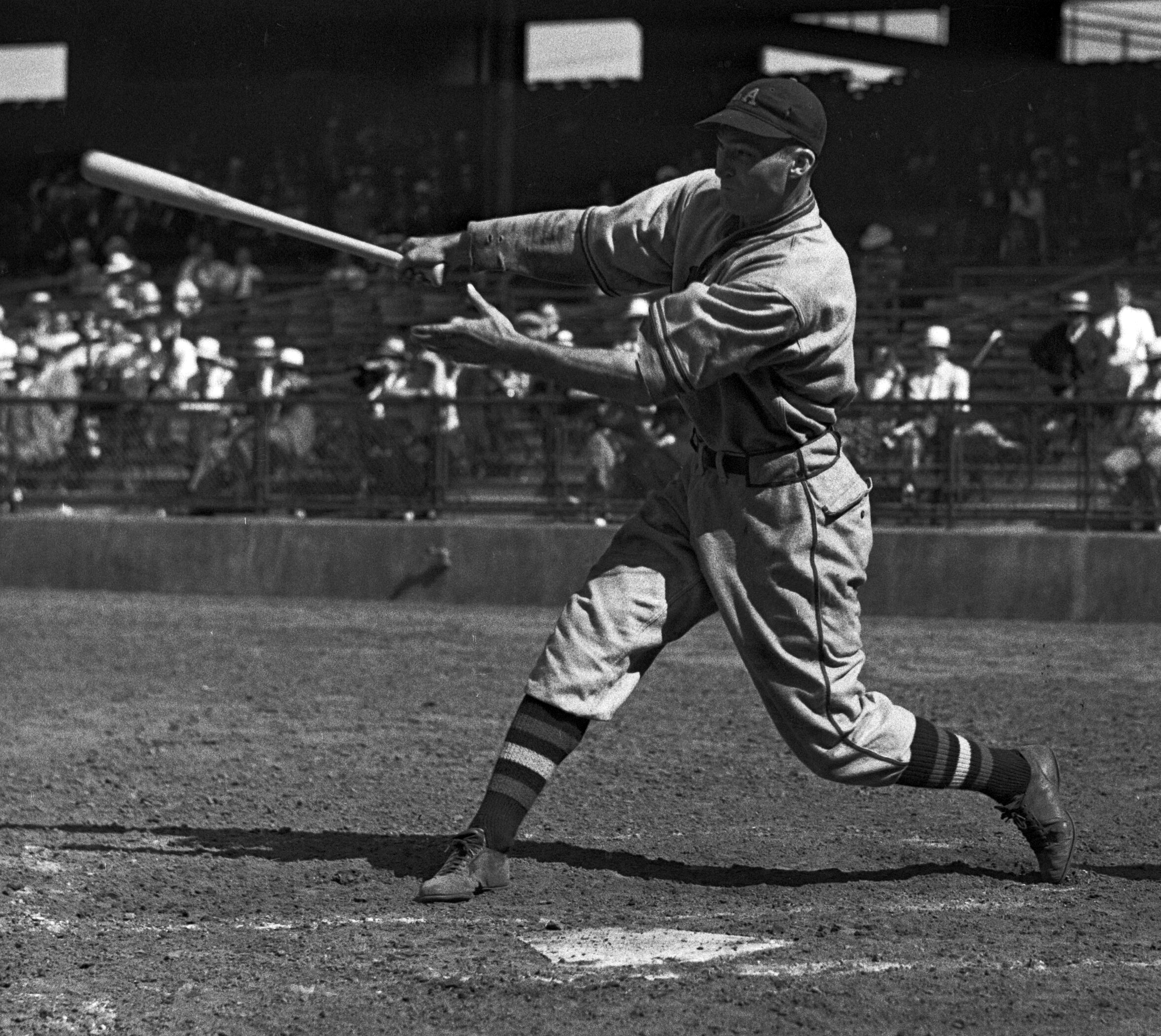
- Oglesby in 1935
- First baseman
- Born: August 10, 1905; Schofield, Missouri, U.S.
- Died: September 1, 1955 (aged 50); Tulsa, Oklahoma, U.S.
- Batted: Left Threw: Left

MLB debut
- April 14, 1936, for the Philadelphia Athletics

Last MLB appearance
- April 17, 1936, for the Philadelphia Athletics

MLB statistics
- Batting average: .182
- Home runs: 0
- Runs batted in: 2
- Stats at Baseball Reference

Teams
- Philadelphia Athletics (1936)

James Dorn Oglesby (August 10, 1905 – September 1, 1955) was an American Major League Baseball first baseman, appearing in three games for the Philadelphia Athletics during the 1936 season. He died of a self-inflicted gunshot wound in 1955.
