= Earl Huckleberry =

American baseball player (1910-1999)

- Pitcher
- Born: May 23, 1910; Konawa, Oklahoma, U.S.
- Died: February 25, 1999 (aged 88); Seminole, Oklahoma, U.S.
- Batted: Right Threw: Right

MLB debut
- September 13, 1935, for the Philadelphia Athletics

Last MLB appearance
- September 13, 1935, for the Philadelphia Athletics

MLB statistics
- Games played: 1
- Win–loss record: 1–0
- Earned run average: 9.45
- Stats at Baseball Reference

Teams
- Philadelphia Athletics (1935)

Earl Eugene Huckleberry (May 23, 1910 – February 25, 1999) was an American pitcher in Major League Baseball. He played for the Philadelphia Athletics in 1935. Huckleberry's lone appearance in professional baseball came on September 13, 1935, in a game in which he started on the mound against the Chicago White Sox. After giving up a run in his first inning as a big leaguer, Huckleberry's team scored 8 runs for him in the bottom of the first, and he'd earn a win in his lone MLB appearance, a game in which his team won 19–7. Unusually, Huckleberry never played a game in the minors either before or after his one game with the Athletics.
