= Wedo Martini =

American baseball player

- Pitcher
- Born: July 1, 1913; Birmingham, Alabama, U.S.
- Died: October 28, 1970 (aged 57); Philadelphia, Pennsylvania, U.S.
- Batted: Right Threw: Right

MLB debut
- July 28, 1935, for the Philadelphia Athletics

Last MLB appearance
- August 28, 1935, for the Philadelphia Athletics

MLB statistics
- Win–loss record: 0–2
- Earned run average: 17.05
- Strikeouts: 1
- Stats at Baseball Reference

Teams
- Philadelphia Athletics (1935)

Guido Joe "Wedo" Martini (July 1, 1913 – October 28, 1970) was an American Major League Baseball (MLB) pitcher who played in 1935 with the Philadelphia Athletics. He batted and threw right-handed.

Martini was born in Birmingham, Alabama where he played high school baseball, once throwing a no-hitter against Ensley High School. He moved with his parents to Philadelphia in 1933 and played semi-professional baseball for years before signing a contract with Connie Mack and the Athletics, who assigned him to the minor league Richmond Colts. He played three games with the Athletics and was cut by the end of the season.

He later worked as a driver for The Philadelphia Inquirer and was a member of the Teamsters Union Local 628 at the time of his death in Philadelphia in 1970.
