= Fred Archer (baseball) =

American baseball player (1910-1981)

- Pitcher
- Born: March 7, 1910; Johnson City, Tennessee, U.S.
- Died: October 31, 1981 (aged 71); Charlotte, North Carolina, U.S.
- Batted: Left Threw: Left

MLB debut
- September 5, 1936, for the Philadelphia Athletics

Last MLB appearance
- September 9, 1937, for the Philadelphia Athletics

MLB statistics
- Win–loss record: 2–3
- Earned run average: 6.35
- Strikeouts: 11
- Stats at Baseball Reference

Teams
- Philadelphia Athletics (1936–1937)

Frederick Marvin Archer (March 7, 1910 – October 31, 1981), also known as "Lefty" Archer, was an American professional baseball player whose career spanned 10 seasons, including parts of two in Major League Baseball with the Philadelphia Athletics in 1936 and 1937. Over his major league career, Archer would compile a record of 2–3 with a 6.35 earned run average (ERA) and 11 strikeouts in seven games, five starts. He also pitched in the minor leagues with the Class-D Leaksville-Draper-Spray Triplets, the Class-A Williamsport Grays, the Double-A Buffalo Bisons, the Class-D Lexington Indians, the Class-A1 New Orleans Pelicans, the Class-B Hazleton Mountaineers, the Class-B Lancaster Red Roses, the Class-B Winston-Salem Twins, the Class-D Landis Senators, the Class-D Statesville Owls and the Class-D Kingsport Cherokees. In 245 minor league games, Archer compiled a record of 57–84.

== Professional career ==
Archer began his professional baseball career in 1934 with the Leaksville-Draper-Spray Triplets of the Class-D Bi-State League. With the Triplets, he compiled a record of 4–8 in 19 games. After not playing organized professional ball in 1935, Archer signed with the Philadelphia Athletics in 1936. Connie Mack, manager of the Athletics, signed Archer from the minor league Landis Cardinals, an independent league team. With the Cardinals, Archer threw a no-hitter on August 9, 1936. He made his debut in Major League Baseball on September 5, 1936, against the Washington Senators, pitching a 10 inning complete game, getting his first career major league win. In his first season in the majors, Archer went 2–3 with a 6.38 earned run average (ERA), two complete games and nine strikeouts in six games, five starts. He started the 1937 with the Class-A Williamsport Grays, who were members of the New York–Penn League and minor league affiliates of the Athletics. With the Grays, Archer went 10–16 with a 4.16 ERA in 42 games. He also played one game in the majors with the Athletics that season. In that game, which was against the Washington Senators, Archer gave-up two runs, both earned, in three innings pitched.

In 1938, Archer joined the Buffalo Bisons of the Double-A International League. The Buffalo Courier-Express said that Archer was "a ball of fire" during spring training in 1938. On the season, Archer went 8–14 with a 4.78 ERA in 32 games, 25 starts. During the 1939 season, Archer played with three different teams. With the Bisons, who were now affiliated with the Cleveland Indians organization, Archer went 2–3 with a 6.75 ERA in 16 games, two starts. He then joined the Class-A1 New Orleans Pelicans, who were also affiliated with Indians. With the Pelicans, Archer went 0–3 in 10 games. Finally that season, Archer joined the Class-D Lexington Indians of the Philadelphia Athletics organization and went 6–2 with a 4.17 ERA in nine games.

Archer joined the Hazleton Mountaineers, who were later relocated to Lancaster, Pennsylvania and renamed the Lancaster Red Roses in 1940. During that season, Archer went 17–11 with a 3.06 ERA in 29 games. Amongst pitchers in the Interstate League, Archer was tied for second in wins. Archer also played for the Class-B Winston-Salem Twins of the Piedmont League, but statistics were not kept. In 1941, he continued playing with the Class-B Lancaster Red Roses. That season, Archer went 1–9 with a 5.46 ERA in 20 games. In 1943, Archer played with three different teams; the Red Roses, whom he had played with the past two seasons, the Class-D Landis Senators and the Class-D Statesville Owls. He went a combined 8–10 in 59 games between the three teams. Archer joined the Class-D Kingsport Cherokees in 1943, who were members of the Appalachian League and affiliated with the Washington Senators. With Kingsport, he went 1–4 in five games. His final season in professional baseball was in 1946. After a two-season absence from the professional circuit, he re-joined the Leaksville-Draper-Spray Triplets, whom he had played with at the start of his career in 1934. That season, Archer went 0–4 in four games.

== Personal ==
Archer was born on March 7, 1910, in Johnson City, Tennessee. He died on October 31, 1981, in Charlotte, North Carolina at the age of 71, and was buried at West Lawn Memorial Park Landis, North Carolina.
