= Stu Flythe =

American baseball player

- Pitcher
- Born: December 5, 1911; Conway, North Carolina, U.S.
- Died: October 18, 1963 (aged 51); Durham, North Carolina, U.S.
- Batted: Right Threw: Right

MLB debut
- May 31, 1936, for the Philadelphia Athletics

Last MLB appearance
- September 6, 1936, for the Philadelphia Athletics

MLB statistics
- Win–loss record: 0–0
- Earned run average: 13.04
- Strikeouts: 14
- Stats at Baseball Reference

Teams
- Philadelphia Athletics (1936)

Stuart McGuire Flythe (December 5, 1911 – October 18, 1963) was an American Major League Baseball pitcher. He played for the Philadelphia Athletics during the 1936 season. He attended North Carolina State College, where he played college baseball for the Wolfpack.
