= Rusty Peters =

American baseball player (1914–2003)

- Infielder
- Born: December 14, 1914; Roanoke, Virginia, US
- Died: February 21, 2003 (aged 88); Harrisonburg, Virginia, US
- Batted: Right Threw: Right

MLB debut
- April 14, 1936, for the Philadelphia Athletics

Last MLB appearance
- September 28, 1947, for the St. Louis Browns

MLB statistics
- Batting average: .236
- Home runs: 8
- Runs batted in: 117
- Stats at Baseball Reference

Teams
- Philadelphia Athletics (1936–1938); Cleveland Indians (1940–1944; 1946); St. Louis Browns (1947)

Russell Dixon Peters (December 14, 1914 – February 21, 2003) was an American professional baseball player. A second baseman, shortstop and third baseman, he played in 471 games over all or parts of ten seasons in Major League Baseball with the Philadelphia Athletics (1936–1938), Cleveland Indians (1940–1944; 1946), and the St. Louis Browns (1947). Peters was born in Roanoke, Virginia, and although he spent his childhood in Dayton, Ohio, he returned to Virginia to attend Washington and Lee University and spent several years in retirement in his native state.

Peters, who wore glasses, hit just .236 in his Major League career and only hit above .300 once – in 47 at bats in 1947. However, he played every infield position and found work as a utility player. In 1937, he had 339 at-bats for the Athletics (his career high) and hit three home runs, drove in 43 runs and stole four bases. An infielder with the Atlanta Crackers of the Class A1 Southern Association in 1938 and 1939, and Rookie of the Year his first year, he was said to be "not only ... a fine mechanical ball player, but he is a fireball in that infield" (Morgan Blake. The Atlanta Constitution.)

The Indians purchased his contract from Atlanta in order to bring him on as backup to its already fine infield. Consequently, he did not play on a regular basis, but even after four years as a "second-stringer", when he did play, he played well. Sportswriter Gorden Cobbledick declared that "evidence has been accumulating in the last few weeks that, all unsuspecting, we have been harboring in our midst one of the most remarkable athletes in the county." Writing about a possible trade of Russ to the Browns, Ed McAuley stated that "it is about time Peters received some recognition as a genuinely valuable member of the team. ... he has been ready and efficient whenever he has been called on – and he has done well at every position in the infield."

His baseball career was interrupted by service in the United States Army during World War II. After the defeat of Japan, he served in the Army of Occupation in Germany and organized baseball teams for intramural games among the troops (The Unicorn Free Press). Toward the end of his career with the Indianapolis Indians (1949–1951), he managed winter baseball teams in Puerto Rico and Panama. In 1993, Russ was recognized as "one of the first fence-busters of Virginia", and he was inducted into the Roanoke-Salem Baseball Hall of Fame.
