= Al Veach =

American baseball player (1909-19900)

- Pitcher
- Born: August 6, 1909; Maylene, Alabama, U.S.
- Died: September 6, 1990 (aged 81); Charlotte, North Carolina, U.S.
- Batted: Right Threw: Right

MLB debut
- September 22, 1935, for the Philadelphia Athletics

Last MLB appearance
- September 29, 1935, for the Philadelphia Athletics

MLB statistics
- Win–loss record: 0-2
- Earned run average: 11.70
- Strikeouts: 3
- Stats at Baseball Reference

Teams
- Philadelphia Athletics (1935)

Alvis Lindel Veach (August 6, 1909 – September 6, 1990) was an American Major League Baseball pitcher who made two starts in 1935 for the Philadelphia Athletics. He batted and threw right-handed.
