= Jack Owens (baseball) =

American baseball player (1908-1958)

- Catcher
- Born: May 6, 1908; Converse, South Carolina, U.S.
- Died: November 14, 1958 (aged 50); Greenville, South Carolina, U.S.
- Batted: Right Threw: Right

MLB debut
- September 21, 1935, for the Philadelphia Athletics

Last MLB appearance
- September 22, 1935, for the Philadelphia Athletics

MLB statistics
- Batting average: .250
- Home runs: 0
- Runs batted in: 1
- Stats at Baseball Reference

Teams
- Philadelphia Athletics (1935)

Furman Lee "Jack" Owens (May 6, 1908 – November 14, 1958) was an American Major League Baseball catcher. He played in two games for the Philadelphia Athletics in 1935.

== Sources ==
- Career statistics from Baseball Reference · Baseball Reference (Minors) · Retrosheet · Baseball Almanac
