= Alex Hooks =

American baseball player (1906-1993)

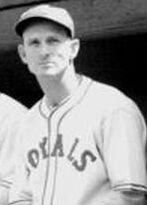
- First baseman / Pinch hitter
- Born: August 29, 1906; Edgewood, Texas, U.S.
- Died: June 19, 1993 (aged 86); Edgewood, Texas, U.S.
- Batted: Left Threw: Left

MLB debut
- April 17, 1935, for the Philadelphia Athletics

Last MLB appearance
- May 20, 1935, for the Philadelphia Athletics

MLB statistics
- Batting average: .227
- Home runs: 0
- Runs batted in: 4
- Stats at Baseball Reference

Teams
- Philadelphia Athletics (1935)

Alexander Marcus Hooks (August 29, 1906 – June 19, 1993) was an American professional baseball player. He had a 17-season (1928–1943; 1946) career in minor league baseball, and appeared in 15 Major League games as a first baseman and pinch hitter for the Philadelphia Athletics during the 1935 season. A native of Edgewood, Texas, he threw and batted left-handed, stood 6 feet 1 inch (1.85 m) tall and weighed 183 pounds (83 kg). Hooks attended Southern Methodist University.

== Career ==
Hooks' Major League trial occurred at the outset of the 1935 season when he was 28 years old. The previous year, he had batted a robust .340 for the Tulsa Oilers of the Texas League.

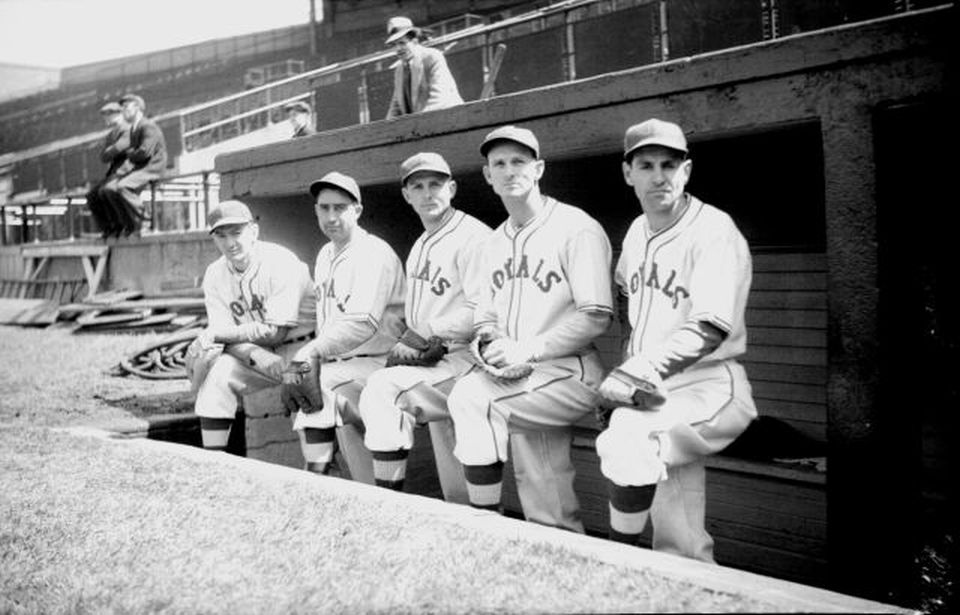
Hooks (fourth from the left) with the Montreal Royals in 1938.

In his big-league debut, Hooks went 2-for-5 against the Washington Senators, but then went hitless in seven at bats in his next two starts, and failed to hold the Athletics' starting first baseman job. After his last MLB appearance on May 20, he was sent to the Atlanta Crackers of the Southern Association, where he batted .341.

Hooks also briefly managed in the minors, with the 1938 Montreal Royals and the 1946 Greenville Majors.

His ten Major-League hits included three doubles.
