= Bernie Snyder =

American baseball player (1913-1999)

- Second baseman/Shortstop
- Born: August 25, 1913; Philadelphia, Pennsylvania, U.S.
- Died: April 15, 1999 (aged 85); Havertown, Pennsylvania, U.S.
- Batted: Right Threw: Right

MLB debut
- September 15, 1935, for the Philadelphia Athletics

Last MLB appearance
- September 29, 1935, for the Philadelphia Athletics

MLB statistics
- Batting average: .344
- Home runs: 0
- Runs batted in: 3
- Stats at Baseball Reference

Teams
- Philadelphia Athletics (1935)

Bernard Austin Snyder (August 25, 1913 – April 15, 1999) was an American Major League Baseball second baseman and shortstop who played in 1935 with the Philadelphia Athletics. He batted and threw right-handed. Snyder had a .344 batting average in 10 games, 11 hits in 32 at-bats, in his one-year career.

He was born in Philadelphia, and died in Havertown, Pennsylvania.
