= Bill Patton (baseball) =

American baseball player (1912-1986)

- Catcher
- Born: October 7, 1912; Cornwall, Pennsylvania
- Died: March 15, 1986 (aged 73); Philadelphia
- Batted: Right Threw: Right

MLB debut
- June 29, 1935, for the Philadelphia Athletics

Last MLB appearance
- September 29, 1935, for the Philadelphia Athletics

MLB statistics
- Batting average: .300
- Home runs: 0
- Runs batted in: 2
- Stats at Baseball Reference

Teams
- Philadelphia Athletics (1935)

George William Patton (October 7, 1912 – March 15, 1986) was a professional baseball player. He was a catcher for one season (1935) with the Philadelphia Athletics. For his career, he compiled a .300 batting average in 10 at-bats, with two runs batted in.

An alumnus of Temple University, he was born in Cornwall, Pennsylvania and later died in Philadelphia at the age of 73.
