= Harry Matuzak =

American baseball player (1910–1978)

- Pitcher
- Born: January 27, 1910; Omer, Michigan, U.S.
- Died: November 16, 1978 (aged 68); Fairhope, Alabama, U.S.
- Batted: Right Threw: Right

MLB debut
- April 19, 1934, for the Philadelphia Athletics

Last MLB appearance
- May 2, 1936, for the Philadelphia Athletics

MLB statistics
- Win–loss record: 0–4
- Earned run average: 5.77
- Strikeouts: 17
- Stats at Baseball Reference

Teams
- Philadelphia Athletics (1934, 1936)

Harry George Matuzak (January 27, 1910 – November 16, 1978) was an American professional baseball player. He was a right-handed pitcher over parts of two seasons (1934, 1936) with the Philadelphia Athletics. For his career, he compiled an 0–4 record, with a 5.77 earned run average, and 35 strikeouts in 39 innings pitched.

He was born in Omer, Michigan and died in Fairhope, Alabama at the age of 68.
