= Bill Ferrazzi =

American baseball player (1907-1993)

- Pitcher
- Born: April 19, 1907; West Quincy, Massachusetts, U.S.
- Died: August 10, 1993 (aged 86); Gainesville, Florida, U.S.
- Batted: Right Threw: Right

MLB debut
- September 7, 1935, for the Philadelphia Athletics

Last MLB appearance
- September 15, 1935, for the Philadelphia Athletics

MLB statistics
- Win–loss record: 1–2
- Earned run average: 5.14
- Strikeouts: 0
- Stats at Baseball Reference

Teams
- Philadelphia Athletics (1935)

William Joseph Ferrazzi (April 19, 1907 – August 10, 1993) was an American Major League Baseball pitcher. He played for the Philadelphia Athletics during the 1935 season. Ferrazzi graduated from the University of Florida with a bachelor's degree in education in 1935.

== Early life ==
Ferrazzi was the son of Italian American immigrants, Anastasio "Ernesto" Ferrazzi and Giuseppina Rossini. His father worked as a stone cutter in the granite quarries of Quincy, MA.

== See also ==
- Florida Gators
- List of Florida Gators baseball players
- List of University of Florida alumni
