= Charlie Moss =

American baseball player (1911–1991)

- Catcher
- Born: March 20, 1911; Meridian, Mississippi, U.S.
- Died: October 9, 1991 (aged 80); Meridian, Mississippi, U.S.
- Batted: Right Threw: Right

MLB debut
- May 19, 1934, for the Philadelphia Athletics

Last MLB appearance
- September 16, 1936, for the Philadelphia Athletics

MLB statistics
- Batting average: .246
- Home runs: 0
- Runs batted in: 12
- Stats at Baseball Reference

Teams
- Philadelphia Athletics (1934–1936)

Charles Crosby Moss (March 20, 1911 – October 9, 1991) was an American Major League Baseball catcher. He played for the Philadelphia Athletics from 1934 to 1936.
