= Carl Doyle =

American baseball player (1912–1951)

- Pitcher
- Born: July 30, 1912; Knoxville, Tennessee, U.S.
- Died: September 4, 1951 (aged 39); Knoxville, Tennessee, U.S.
- Batted: Right Threw: Right

MLB debut
- August 5, 1935, for the Philadelphia Athletics

Last MLB appearance
- September 26, 1940, for the St. Louis Cardinals

MLB statistics
- Win–loss record: 6–15
- Earned run average: 6.95
- Strikeouts: 101
- Stats at Baseball Reference

Teams
- Philadelphia Athletics (1935–1936); Brooklyn Dodgers (1939–1940); St. Louis Cardinals (1940)

William Carl Doyle (July 30, 1912 – September 4, 1951) was an American professional baseball pitcher who appeared in 51 games in four seasons in Major League Baseball for the Philadelphia Athletics (1935–1936), Brooklyn Dodgers (1939–1940) and St. Louis Cardinals (1940). A right-hander, he was listed as 6 feet 1 inch (1.85 m) tall and 185 pounds (84 kg).

Doyle's pro career lasted eight seasons (1935–1941, 1943). In his 51 MLB games pitched, he posted a 6–15 won–lost record and a poor 6.95 earned run average, surrendering 277 hits, 155 bases on balls, and 172 earned runs in 2222/3 innings pitched; he fanned 101. Notably, he was one of four players that Brooklyn traded to the Cardinals on June 12, 1940, in their blockbuster acquisition of slugger Joe Medwick. He managed the Morristown Red Sox of the Mountain States League in 1950.

Doyle died in the city of his birth, Knoxville, Tennessee, of a pulmonary infarction in 1951 at age 39.
