= Jack Peerson =

American baseball player (1910-1966)

- Shortstop
- Born: August 28, 1910; Brunswick, Georgia, U.S.
- Died: October 23, 1966 (aged 56); Fort Walton Beach, Florida, U.S.
- Batted: Right Threw: Right

MLB debut
- September 7, 1935, for the Philadelphia Athletics

Last MLB appearance
- September 27, 1936, for the Philadelphia Athletics

MLB statistics
- Batting average: .321
- Home runs: 0
- Runs batted in: 6
- Stats at Baseball Reference

Teams
- Philadelphia Athletics (1935–1936)

Jack Chiles Peerson (August 28, 1910 – October 23, 1966) was an American Major League Baseball shortstop. He played for the Philadelphia Athletics during the 1935 and 1936 seasons.
