= Whitey Wilshere =

American baseball player

- Pitcher
- Born: August 3, 1912; Poplar Ridge, New York
- Died: May 23, 1985 (aged 72); Cooperstown, New York
- Batted: Left Threw: Left

MLB debut
- June 24, 1933, for the Philadelphia Athletics

Last MLB appearance
- May 31, 1936, for the Philadelphia Athletics

MLB statistics
- Win–loss record: 10–12
- Earned run average: 5.28
- Strikeouts: 103
- Stats at Baseball Reference

Teams
- Philadelphia Athletics (1934–1936)

Vernon Sprague "Whitey" Wilshere (August 3, 1912 – May 23, 1985) was a professional baseball pitcher. Collegiately, he played for the Indiana Hoosiers earning varsity letters in both 1933 and 1934. He turned professional after his 1934 collegiate season. He went on to play three seasons in Major League Baseball from 1934 to 1936 with the Philadelphia Athletics. He batted and threw left-handed.

He was inducted into the Indiana University Athletics Hall of Fame in 1996.
