= Dutch Lieber =

American baseball player (1910-1961)

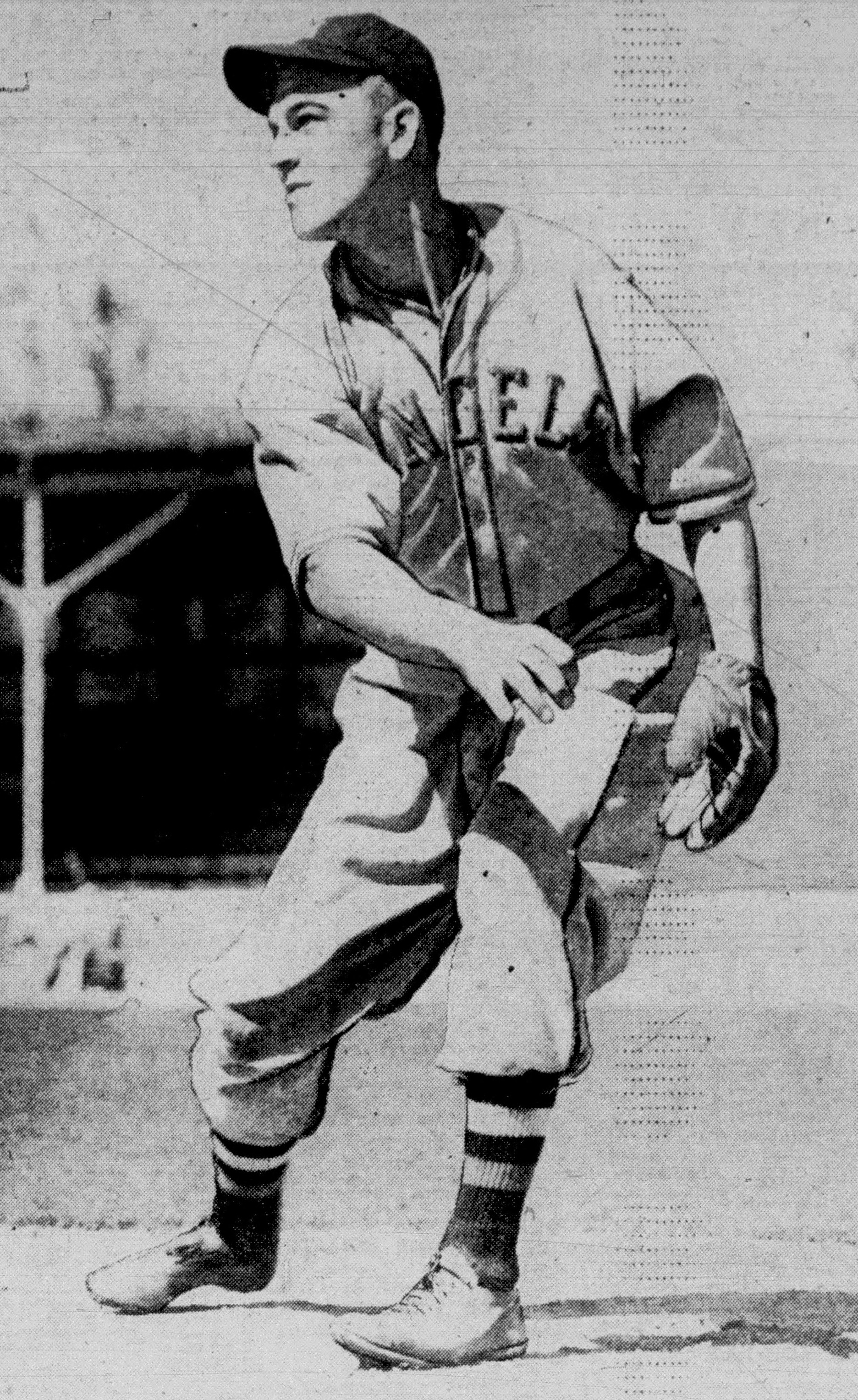
- Pitcher
- Born: February 1, 1910; Alameda, California, U.S.
- Died: December 31, 1961 (aged 51); Sawtelle, California, U.S.
- Batted: Right Threw: Right

MLB debut
- April 18, 1935, for the Philadelphia Athletics

Last MLB appearance
- April 26, 1936, for the Philadelphia Athletics

MLB statistics
- Win–loss record: 1–2
- Earned run average: 4.01
- Strikeouts: 15
- Stats at Baseball Reference

Teams
- Philadelphia Athletics (1935–1936)

Charles Edwin "Dutch" Lieber (February 1, 1910 – December 31, 1961) was an American professional baseball player. He was a right-handed pitcher over parts of two seasons (1935–36) with the Philadelphia Athletics. For his career, he compiled a 1–2 record, with a 4.01 earned run average, and 15 strikeouts in 58.1 innings pitched.

He was born in Alameda, California and died in Sawtelle, California at the age of 51.
