= Herman Fink =

American baseball player (1911-1980)

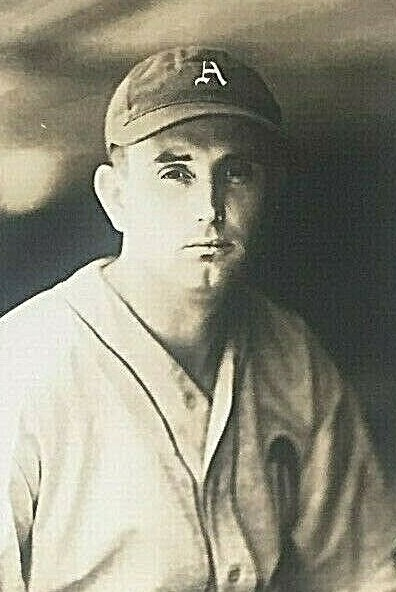
- Pitcher
- Born: August 22, 1911; Concord, North Carolina, U.S.
- Died: August 24, 1980 (aged 69); Salisbury, North Carolina, U.S.
- Batted: Right Threw: Right

MLB debut
- September 16, 1935, for the Philadelphia Athletics

Last MLB appearance
- September 27, 1937, for the Philadelphia Athletics

MLB statistics
- Win–loss record: 10–20
- Strikeouts: 73
- Earned run average: 5.22
- Stats at Baseball Reference

Teams
- Philadelphia Athletics (1935–1937)

Herman Adam Fink (August 22, 1911 – August 24, 1980) was an American Major League Baseball pitcher. He played all or part of three seasons in the majors, from 1935 until 1937, for the Philadelphia Athletics.

== Sources ==
- Career statistics from Baseball Reference · Baseball Reference (Minors) · Retrosheet · Baseball Almanac
