= Bill Conroy (catcher) =

American baseball player (1915–1997)

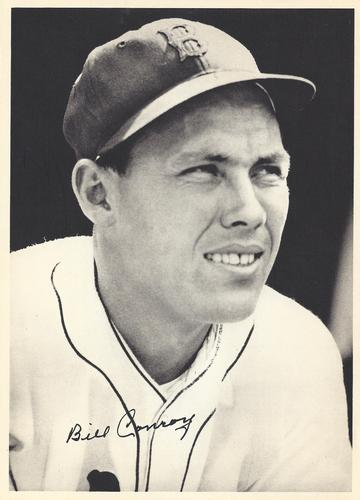
- Catcher
- Born: February 26, 1915; Bloomington, Illinois, U.S.
- Died: November 13, 1997 (aged 82); Citrus Heights, California, U.S.
- Batted: Right Threw: Right

MLB debut
- September 21, 1935, for the Philadelphia Athletics

Last MLB appearance
- October 1, 1944, for the Boston Red Sox

MLB statistics
- Batting average: .199
- Home runs: 5
- Runs batted in: 33
- Stats at Baseball Reference

Teams
- Philadelphia Athletics (1935–1937); Boston Red Sox (1942–1944)

William Gordon Conroy (February 26, 1915 – November 13, 1997) was a backup catcher who played in Major League Baseball between 1935 and 1944. Listed at 6' 0", 185 lb., Conroy batted and threw right-handed. He was born in Bloomington, Illinois.

Conroy reached the majors in 1935 with the Philadelphia Athletics, playing for them three years before joining the US Army during World War II. After discharge, he played for the Boston Red Sox from 1942 through 1944. His most productive season came in 1942 with Boston, when he appeared in a career-high 83 games and hit four home runs with 20 runs batted in.

In a six-season career, Conroy was a .199 hitter (90-for-452) with five home runs and 33 RBI in 169 games, including 13 doubles, three triples, and a .322 on-base percentage.

Conroy died in Citrus Heights, California at age 82.
