= George Turbeville =

American baseball player (1914-1983)

- Pitcher
- Born: August 24, 1914; Turbeville, South Carolina, U.S.
- Died: October 5, 1983 (aged 69); Salisbury, North Carolina, U.S.
- Batted: Right Threw: Left

MLB debut
- July 20, 1935, for the Philadelphia Athletics

Last MLB appearance
- September 29, 1937, for the Philadelphia Athletics

MLB statistics
- Win–loss record: 2–12
- Earned run average: 6.14
- Strikeouts: 47
- Stats at Baseball Reference

Teams
- Philadelphia Athletics (1935–1937)

George Elkins Turbeville (August 24, 1914, in Turbeville, South Carolina – October 5, 1983, in Salisbury, North Carolina) was a Major League Baseball pitcher who played for the Philadelphia Athletics from 1935 to 1937.

He made his major league debut on July 20, 1935 at the age of 20. He appeared in 19 games for the Athletics, starting six of them and going 0–3 with a 7.63 ERA. In 63 2/3 innings, he allowed 74 hits and 69 walks, while striking out only 20 batters. In 1936, he went 2–5 with a 6.39 ERA in 12 games (six starts). He walked 32 batters in 43 2/3 innings, striking out 10. On May 10 of that year, he allowed Joe DiMaggio's first career home run. He played his final big league season in 1937, going 0–4 with a 4.77 ERA in 31 games (three starts). In 77 1/3 innings, he walked 56 batters and struck out 19 while leading the league with nine wild pitches. He also led the league in errors among pitchers with five.

Overall, he pitched three seasons in major league baseball, playing his final game on September 29, 1937. He went 2–12 with a 6.14 ERA, walking 157 batters in 184 2/3 innings while striking out only 47. He is one of only two pitchers in major league history to walk at least 145 and strikeout less than 55 batters in a career - the other is Dick Welteroth.

He played minor league baseball until 1946, going 51–47 in 191 minor league games. In seven minor league seasons, he walked 564 batters.

Following his death, he was interred at Greenlawn Memorial Park in Columbia, South Carolina.
