= 1924 New York Yankees season =

Season for the Major League Baseball team the New York Yankees

1924 New York Yankees
- League: American League
- Ballpark: Yankee Stadium
- City: New York City, New York
- Record: 89–63 (.586)
- League place: 2nd
- Owners: Jacob Ruppert
- General managers: Ed Barrow
- Managers: Miller Huggins

The 1924 New York Yankees season was the team's 22nd season. The team finished with a record of 89–63, finishing 2 games behind the Washington Senators. New York was managed by Miller Huggins. The Yankees played their home games at Yankee Stadium.

== Regular season ==
=== Season standings ===
American League
Team	W	L	Pct.	GB	Home	Road
Washington Senators	92	62	.597	—	47‍–‍30	45‍–‍32
New York Yankees	89	63	.586	2	45‍–‍32	44‍–‍31
Detroit Tigers	86	68	.558	6	45‍–‍33	41‍–‍35
St. Louis Browns	74	78	.487	17	41‍–‍36	33‍–‍42
Philadelphia Athletics	71	81	.467	20	36‍–‍39	35‍–‍42
Cleveland Indians	67	86	.438	24½	37‍–‍38	30‍–‍48
Boston Red Sox	67	87	.435	25	41‍–‍36	26‍–‍51
Chicago White Sox	66	87	.431	25½	37‍–‍39	29‍–‍48

=== Record vs. opponents ===
1924 American League record Sources:
Team	BOS	CWS	CLE	DET	NYY	PHA	SLB	WSH
Boston	—	10–12	14–8	6–16	5–17–1	12–10	11–11–1	9–13–1
Chicago	12–10	—	11–11	8–14–1	6–16	11–11	13–8	5–17
Cleveland	8–14	11–11	—	7–15	8–14	11–11	11–10	11–11
Detroit	16–6	14–8–1	15–7	—	13–9	11–11	9–13	8–14–1
New York	17–5–1	16–6	14–8	9–13	—	12–8	12–10	9–13
Philadelphia	10–12	11–11	11–11	11–11	8–12	—	13–9	7–15
St. Louis	11–11–1	8–13	10–11	13–9	10–12	9–13	—	13–9
Washington	13–9–1	17–5	11–11	14–8–1	13–9	15–7	9–13	—

=== Roster ===
1924 New York Yankees
Roster
Pitchers: Walter Beall; Joe Bush; Milt Gaston; Waite Hoyt; Sam Jones; Al Mamaux; Cliff Markle; Herb Pennock; George Pipgras; Oscar Roettger; Bob Shawkey; Ben Shields	Catchers: Chick Autry; Benny Bengough; Fred Hofmann; Wally Schang; Infielders: Joe Dugan; Lou Gehrig; Mack Hillis; Ernie Johnson; Mike McNally; Wally Pipp; Everett Scott; Aaron Ward	Outfielders: Earle Combs; Harvey Hendrick; Shags Horan; Bob Meusel; Ben Paschal; Babe Ruth; Whitey Witt	Manager: Miller Huggins; Coaches: Charley O'Leary

== Player stats ==
= Indicates team leader

= Indicates league leader

=== Batting ===
==== Starters by position ====
Note: Pos = Position; G = Games played; AB = At bats; H = Hits; Avg. = Batting average; HR = Home runs; RBI = Runs batted in

Pos	Player	G	AB	H	Avg.	HR	RBI
C	Wally Schang	114	356	104	.292	5	51
1B	Wally Pipp	153	589	174	.295	9	110
2B	Aaron Ward	120	400	101	.253	8	66
3B	Joe Dugan	148	610	184	.302	3	54
SS	Everett Scott	153	548	137	.250	4	59
OF	Bob Meusel	143	630	188	.325	12	124
OF	Whitey Witt	147	600	178	.297	1	38
OF	Babe Ruth	153	529	200	.378	46	124

==== Other batters ====
Note: G = Games played; AB = At bats; H = Hits; Avg. = Batting average; HR = Home runs; RBI = Runs batted in

Player	G	AB	H	Avg.	HR	RBI
Fred Hofmann	62	166	29	.175	1	11
Ernie Johnson	64	119	42	.353	3	12
Harvey Hendrick	40	76	20	.263	1	11
Mike McNally	49	69	17	.246	0	2
Earl Combs	24	35	14	.400	0	2
Shags Horan	22	31	9	.290	0	7
Benny Bengough	11	16	5	.313	0	3
Lou Gehrig	10	12	6	.500	0	5
Ben Paschal	4	12	3	.250	0	3
Mack Hillis	1	1	0	.000	0	0
Chick Autry	1	0	0	----	0	0

=== Pitching ===
==== Starting pitchers ====
Note: G = Games pitched; IP = Innings pitched; W = Wins; L = Losses; ERA = Earned run average; SO = Strikeouts

Player	G	IP	W	L	ERA	SO
Herb Pennock	40	286.1	21	9	2.83	101
Joe Bush	39	252.0	17	16	3.57	80
Waite Hoyt	46	247.0	18	13	3.79	71
Bob Shawkey	38	207.2	16	11	4.12	114
Sad Sam Jones	36	178.2	9	6	3.63	53

==== Other pitchers ====
Note: G = Games pitched; IP = Innings pitched; W = Wins; L = Losses; ERA = Earned run average; SO = Strikeouts

Player	G	IP	W	L	ERA	SO
Cliff Markle	7	23.1	0	3	8.87	7
Walter Beall	4	23.0	2	0	3.52	18

==== Relief pitchers ====
Note: G = Games pitched; W = Wins; L = Losses; SV = Saves; ERA = Earned run average; SO = Strikeouts

Player	G	W	L	SV	ERA	SO
Milt Gaston	29	5	3	1	4.50	24
Al Mamaux	14	1	1	0	5.68	12
George Pipgras	9	0	1	1	9.98	4
Ben Shields	2	0	0	0	27.00	3
Oscar Roettger	1	0	0	0	inf	0
