= 1921 Philadelphia Athletics season =

1921 Philadelphia Athletics
- League: American League
- Ballpark: Shibe Park
- City: Philadelphia
- Record: 53–100 (.346)
- League place: 8th
- Owners: Connie Mack, Benjamin Shibe, Tom Shibe and John Shibe
- Managers: Connie Mack

The 1921 Philadelphia Athletics season involved the A's finishing eighth in the American League for the seventh time in a row with a record of 53 wins and 100 losses.

== Regular season ==
=== Season standings ===
American League
Team	W	L	Pct.	GB	Home	Road
New York Yankees	98	55	.641	—	53‍–‍25	45‍–‍30
Cleveland Indians	94	60	.610	4½	51‍–‍26	43‍–‍34
St. Louis Browns	81	73	.526	17½	43‍–‍34	38‍–‍39
Washington Senators	80	73	.523	18	46‍–‍30	34‍–‍43
Boston Red Sox	75	79	.487	23½	41‍–‍36	34‍–‍43
Detroit Tigers	71	82	.464	27	37‍–‍40	34‍–‍42
Chicago White Sox	62	92	.403	36½	37‍–‍40	25‍–‍52
Philadelphia Athletics	53	100	.346	45	28‍–‍47	25‍–‍53

=== Record vs. opponents ===
1921 American League record Sources:
Team	BOS	CWS	CLE	DET	NYY	PHA	SLB	WSH
Boston	—	15–7	8–14	15–7	7–15	12–10	9–13	9–13
Chicago	7–15	—	7–15	8–14	13–9	14–8	7–15	6–16
Cleveland	14–8	15–7	—	13–9	8–14	15–7	17–5	12–10
Detroit	7–15	14–8	9–13	—	5–17	14–7–1	12–10	10–12
New York	15–7	9–13	14–8	17–5	—	17–5	13–9	13–8
Philadelphia	10–12	8–14	7–15	7–14–1	5–17	—	5–17	11–11–1
St. Louis	13–9	15–7	5–17	10–12	9–13	17–5	—	12–10
Washington	13–9	16–6	10–12	12–10	8–13	11–11–1	10–12	—

=== Roster ===
1921 Philadelphia Athletics
Roster
Pitchers: Bill Bishop; Harvey Freeman; Slim Harriss; Bob Hasty; Fred Heimach; Dave Keefe; Ray Miner; Roy Moore; Rollie Naylor; Scott Perry; Eddie Rommel; Jim Sullivan; Arlas Taylor; Lefty Wolf	Catchers: Glenn Myatt; Cy Perkins; Lena Styles; Infielders: Bill Barrett; Frank Brazill; Frank Callaway; Joe Dugan; Jimmy Dykes; Dot Fulghum; Chick Galloway; Ivy Griffin; Emmett McCann; Johnny Walker	Outfielders: Zip Collins; Paul Johnson; Ben Mallonee; Frank Walker; Tilly Walker; Frank Welch; Whitey Witt; Other batters: Red Shannon; Elmer Yoter	Manager: Connie Mack

== Player stats ==
= Indicates team leader

=== Batting ===
==== Starters by position ====
Note: Pos = Position; G = Games played; AB = At bats; H = Hits; Avg. = Batting average; HR = Home runs; RBI = Runs batted in

Pos	Player	G	AB	H	Avg.	HR	RBI
C	Cy Perkins	141	538	155	.288	12	73
1B	Johnny Walker	113	423	109	.258	2	46
2B	Jimmy Dykes	155	613	168	.274	16	77
SS	Chick Galloway	131	465	123	.265	3	47
3B	Joe Dugan	119	461	136	.295	10	58
OF	Tillie Walker	142	556	169	.304	23	101
OF	Frank Welch	115	403	115	.285	7	45
OF	Whitey Witt	154	629	198	.315	4	45

==== Other batters ====
Note: G = Games played; AB = At bats; H = Hits; Avg. = Batting average; HR = Home runs; RBI = Runs batted in

Player	G	AB	H	Avg.	HR	RBI
Frank Brazill	66	177	48	.271	0	19
Emmett McCann	52	157	35	.223	0	15
Paul Johnson	48	127	40	.315	1	10
Ivy Griffin	39	103	33	.320	0	13
Zip Collins	24	71	20	.282	0	5
Glenn Myatt	44	69	14	.203	0	5
Frank Walker	19	66	15	.227	1	6
Frank Callaway	14	50	12	.240	0	4
Bill Barrett	14	30	7	.233	0	3
Ben Mallonee	7	25	6	.240	0	4
Lena Styles	4	5	1	.200	0	0
Elmer Yoter	3	3	0	.000	0	0
Dot Fulghum	2	2	0	.000	0	0
Red Shannon	1	1	0	.000	0	0

=== Pitching ===
= Indicates league leader

==== Starting pitchers ====
Note: G = Games pitched; IP = Innings pitched; W = Wins; L = Losses; ERA = Earned run average; SO = Strikeouts

Player	G	IP	W	L	ERA	SO
Eddie Rommel	46	285.1	16	23	3.94	71
Slim Harriss	39	227.2	11	16	4.27	92
Roy Moore	29	191.2	10	10	4.51	64
Scott Perry	12	70.0	3	6	4.11	19
Jim Sullivan	2	17.0	0	2	3.18	8
Fred Heimach	1	9.0	1	0	0.00	1
Arlas Taylor	1	2.0	0	1	22.50	1

==== Other pitchers ====
Note: G = Games pitched; IP = Innings pitched; W = Wins; L = Losses; ERA = Earned run average; SO = Strikeouts

Player	G	IP	W	L	ERA	SO
Bob Hasty	35	179.1	5	16	4.87	46
Dave Keefe	44	173.0	2	9	4.68	68
Rollie Naylor	32	169.1	3	13	4.84	39
Harvey Freeman	18	48.0	1	4	7.69	5

==== Relief pitchers ====
Note: G = Games pitched; W = Wins; L = Losses; SV = Saves; ERA = Earned run average; SO = Strikeouts

Player	G	W	L	SV	ERA	SO
Lefty Wolf	8	0	0	0	7.20	11
Bill Barrett	4	1	0	0	7.20	2
Bill Bishop	2	0	0	0	9.00	4
Ray Miner	1	0	0	0	36.00	1
