= 1923 New York Yankees season =

Season for the Major League Baseball team the New York Yankees

1923 New York Yankees
- World Series champions American League Tri champions
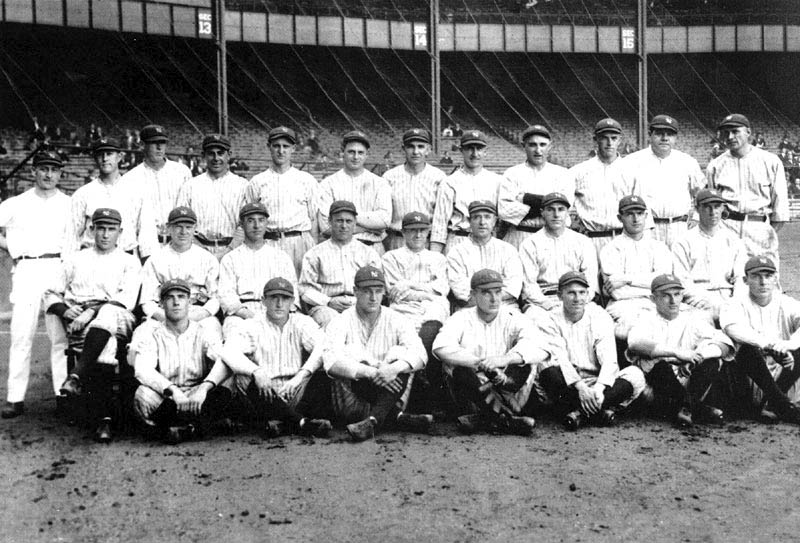
- League: American League
- Ballpark: Yankee Stadium
- City: New York City, New York
- Record: 98–54 (.645)
- League place: 1st
- Owners: Jacob Ruppert and Tillinghast L'Hommedieu Huston
- General manager: Ed Barrow
- Manager: Miller Huggins

The 1923 New York Yankees season was the 21st season for the American League franchise. Manager Miller Huggins led the team to their third straight pennant with a 98–54 record, 16 games ahead of the second place Detroit Tigers. The Yankees moved into the now-famous Yankee Stadium. In the 1923 World Series, they avenged their 1921 and 1922 losses by defeating the New York Giants in 6 games, 4 games to 2, and won their first World Series title.

== Regular season ==
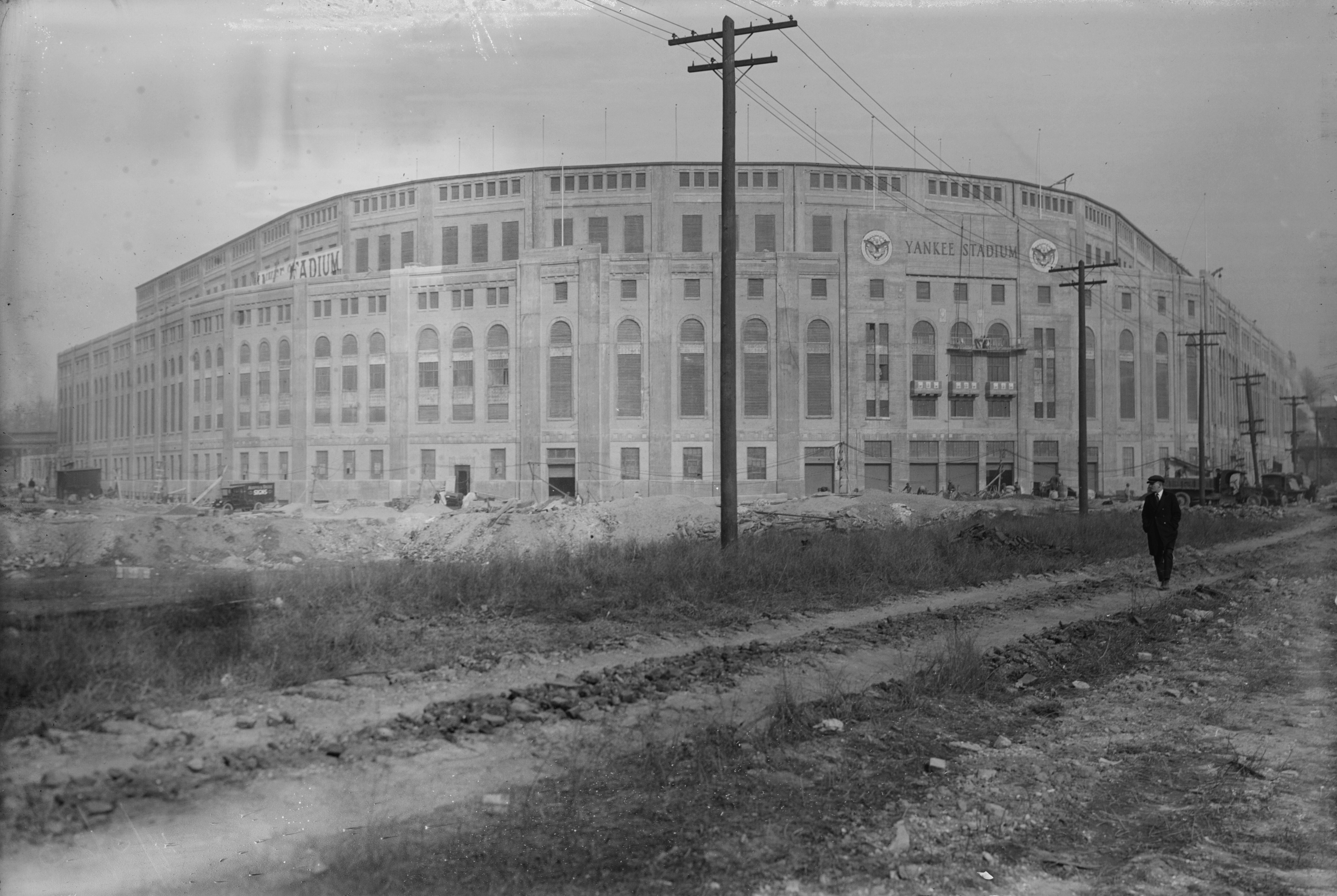
Yankee Stadium in 1923, about 2 weeks before opening.

The Yankees began their first World Championship season on April 18 as they opened Yankee Stadium. Babe Ruth christened the new stadium with a home run in the Yankees' 4–1 victory over the Boston Red Sox. The stadium would later be called "the House that Ruth Built".

On May 5, the Yankees beat the Philadelphia Athletics 7–2 at Yankee Stadium to regain first place, the Yankees would never fall back in the standings for the rest of the season.

Babe Ruth set a Yankees record for highest batting average in one season by hitting .393. Ruth also finished the season with 41 home runs and 130 RBIs. Ruth's average was not enough to win the batting title, as Ruth finished in second place to Detroit's Harry Heilmann who batted .403. Ruth reached base safely 379 times during the season.

=== Season standings ===
American League
Team	W	L	Pct.	GB	Home	Road
New York Yankees	98	54	.645	—	46‍–‍30	52‍–‍24
Detroit Tigers	83	71	.539	16	45‍–‍32	38‍–‍39
Cleveland Indians	82	71	.536	16½	42‍–‍36	40‍–‍35
Washington Senators	75	78	.490	23½	43‍–‍34	32‍–‍44
St. Louis Browns	74	78	.487	24	40‍–‍36	34‍–‍42
Philadelphia Athletics	69	83	.454	29	34‍–‍41	35‍–‍42
Chicago White Sox	69	85	.448	30	30‍–‍45	39‍–‍40
Boston Red Sox	61	91	.401	37	37‍–‍40	24‍–‍51

=== Record vs. opponents ===
1923 American League record Sources:
Team	BOS	CWS	CLE	DET	NYY	PHA	SLB	WSH
Boston	—	9–13	10–12	10–12–1	8–14	13–7	4–18–1	7–15
Chicago	13–9	—	9–13	9–13	7–15	10–12	11–11–1	10–12–1
Cleveland	12–10	13–9	—	9–13	12–10	12–10	14–8	10–11
Detroit	12–10–1	13–9	13–9	—	10–12	12–10	12–10	11–11
New York	14–8	15–7	10–12	12–10	—	16–6	15–5	16–6
Philadelphia	7–13	12–10	10–12	10–12	6–16	—	9–13	15–7–1
St. Louis	18–4–1	11–11–1	8–14	10–12	5–15	13–9	—	9–13
Washington	15–7	12–10–1	11–10	11–11	6–16	7–15–1	13–9	—

=== Roster ===
1923 New York Yankees
Roster
Pitchers: Joe Bush; Waite Hoyt; Sam Jones; Carl Mays; Herb Pennock; George Pipgras; Oscar Roettger; Bob Shawkey	Catchers: Benny Bengough; Fred Hofmann; Wally Schang; Infielders: Joe Dugan; Mike Gazella; Lou Gehrig; Ernie Johnson; Mike McNally; Wally Pipp; Everett Scott; Aaron Ward	Outfielders: Hinkey Haines; Harvey Hendrick; Bob Meusel; Babe Ruth; Elmer Smith; Whitey Witt	Manager: Miller Huggins; Coaches: Charley O'Leary

== Player stats ==
= Indicates team leader

= Indicates league leader

=== Batting ===
==== Starters by position ====
Note: Pos = Position; G = Games played; AB = At bats; H = Hits; Avg. = Batting average; HR = Home runs; RBI = Runs batted in

Pos	Player	G	AB	H	Avg.	HR	RBI
C	Wally Schang	84	272	75	.276	2	29
1B	Wally Pipp	144	569	173	.304	6	108
2B	Aaron Ward	152	567	161	.284	10	82
3B	Joe Dugan	146	644	182	.283	7	67
SS	Everett Scott	152	533	131	.246	6	60
OF	Babe Ruth	152	522	205	.393	41	130
OF	Whitey Witt	146	596	187	.314	6	56
OF	Bob Meusel	132	460	144	.314	9	91

==== Other batters ====
Note: G = Games played; AB = At bats; H = Hits; Avg. = Batting average; HR = Home runs; RBI = Runs batted in

Player	G	AB	H	Avg.	HR	RBI
Fred Hofmann	72	238	69	.290	3	26
Elmer Smith	70	183	56	.306	7	35
Harvey Hendrick	37	66	18	.273	3	12
Benny Bengough	19	53	7	.132	0	3
Ernie Johnson	19	38	17	.448	1	8
Mike McNally	30	38	8	.211	0	1
Lou Gehrig	13	26	11	.423	1	9
Hinkey Haines	28	25	4	.160	0	3
Mike Gazella	8	13	1	.077	0	1

=== Pitching ===
==== Starting pitchers ====
Note: G = Games pitched; IP = Innings pitched; W = Wins; L = Losses; ERA = Earned run average; SO = Strikeouts

Player	G	IP	W	L	ERA	SO
Joe Bush	37	275.2	19	15	3.43	125
Bob Shawkey	36	258.2	16	11	3.51	125
Sam Jones	34	243.0	21	8	3.63	68
Waite Hoyt	37	238.2	17	9	3.02	60
Herb Pennock	35	238.1	19	6	3.13	93

Note: Jones was team leader in saves with 4.

==== Other pitchers ====
Note: G = Games pitched; IP = Innings pitched; W = Wins; L = Losses; ERA = Earned run average; SO = Strikeouts

Player	G	IP	W	L	ERA	SO
Carl Mays	23	81.1	5	2	6.20	16
George Pipgras	8	33.1	1	3	5.94	12

==== Relief pitchers ====
Note: G = Games pitched; W = Wins; L = Losses; SV = Saves; ERA = Earned run average; SO = Strikeouts

Player	G	W	L	SV	ERA	SO
Oscar Roettger	5	0	0	1	8.49	7

== 1923 World Series ==
Game	Date	Visitor	Score	Home	Score	Record (NYY-NYG)	Attendance
1	October 10	New York Giants	5	New York Yankees	4	0–1	55,307
2	October 11	New York Yankees	4	New York Giants	2	1–1	40,402
3	October 12	New York Giants	1	New York Yankees	0	1–2	62,430
4	October 13 ‡	New York Yankees	8	New York Giants	4	2–2	46,302
5	October 14 ‡	New York Giants	1	New York Yankees	8	3–2	62,817
6	October 15 ‡	New York Yankees	6	New York Giants	4	4–2	34,172
New York Yankees win 4–2

== Awards and honors ==
- Babe Ruth, AL MVP Award

=== Franchise records ===
- Babe Ruth, club record, highest single-season batting average, (.393)
