= Fulghum =

Fulghum is a surname. Notable people with the surname include:

- Dot Fulghum (1900–1947), American baseball player
- Jim Fulghum (1944–2014), American politician and physician
- Luke Fulghum (born 1980), American ice hockey player
- Robert Fulghum (born 1937), American writer
