= Dot Fulghum =

American baseball player (1900-1947)

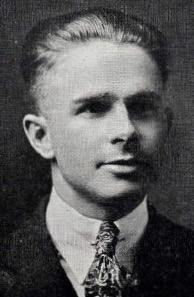
- Fulghum at Auburn University, c. 1921
- Pinch hitter / Shortstop
- Born: July 4, 1900; Valdosta, Georgia
- Died: November 2, 1947 (aged 47); Miami, Florida
- Batted: Right Threw: Right

MLB debut
- September 15, 1921, for the Philadelphia Athletics

Last MLB appearance
- September 24, 1921, for the Philadelphia Athletics

MLB statistics
- Batting average: .000
- Games played: 2
- Stats at Baseball Reference

Teams
- Philadelphia Athletics (1921)

James Lavoisier "Dot" Fulghum (Note: Fulghum's middle name, Lavoisier, is as listed by Retrosheet, his college yearbook entry, and his draft registration card of February 1942. Fulghum's grave marker has a different spelling of his middle name, "Lavoisia".) (July 4, 1900 – November 2, 1947) was an American professional baseball player who appeared in two games with the 1921 Philadelphia Athletics of Major League Baseball (MLB). Listed at 5 feet 8.5 inches (1.740 m) and 165 pounds (75 kg), he batted and threw right-handed.

== Biography ==
Fulghum played college baseball at Auburn University, where he was selected to the 1921 College Baseball All-Southern Team. He was signed by the Philadelphia Athletics in late April 1921. He was assigned to the minor league Augusta Georgians of the South Atlantic League, where he batted .279 in 75 games during the 1921 season.

Fulghum made two appearances for the Athletics during September 1921, his only major league games. He was hitless in two at bats, and drew one walk. His first appearance came against the Cleveland Indians on September 15, in the first game of a home doubleheader at Shibe Park. With the Indians leading in the eighth inning, 15–3, Fulghum pinch hit for pitcher Ray Miner and drew a walk; he was then forced out at second base when the next hitter, Whitey Witt, hit a ground ball. Fulghum did not play defensive, as he was replaced by reliever Lefty Wolf for the ninth inning. Fulghum's second appearance came on September 24, in the second game of a home doubleheader versus the Chicago White Sox. In the fifth inning, with the White Sox leading, 12–0, Fulghum pinch hit for second baseman Jimmy Dykes and struck out. Fulghum stayed in the game defensively, at shortstop. Fulghum batted once more, grounding into a double play in the seventh inning. In the field, he committed an error in his only defensive chance.

After his time with the Athletics, Fulghum played semi-professional baseball during 1922 in Andalusia, Alabama, and during 1923 in Pensacola, Florida. Born in 1900 in Valdosta, Georgia, Fulghum had graduated from Pensacola High School. He served in the military during World War I. A resident of Raleigh, North Carolina, at the time of his death, he died in Miami in 1947. He was married and had two daughters and a son.
