= Aaron Ward (baseball) =

American baseball player (1896–1961)

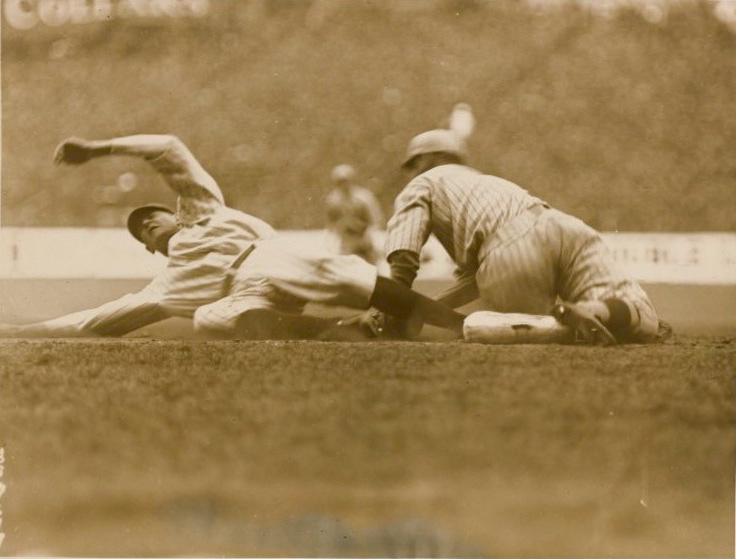
- Aaron Ward getting tagged out at third during the first game at Yankee Stadium on April 18, 1923.
- Second baseman
- Born: August 28, 1896; Booneville, Arkansas, U.S.
- Died: January 30, 1961 (aged 64); New Orleans, Louisiana, U.S.
- Batted: Right Threw: Right

MLB debut
- August 14, 1917, for the New York Yankees

Last MLB appearance
- June 7, 1928, for the Cleveland Indians

MLB statistics
- Batting average: .268
- Home runs: 50
- Runs batted in: 446
- Stats at Baseball Reference

Teams
- New York Yankees (1917–1926); Chicago White Sox (1927); Cleveland Indians (1928)

Career highlights and awards
- World Series champion (1923)

Aaron Lee Ward (August 28, 1896 – January 30, 1961) was an American infielder for the New York Yankees (1917–1926), Chicago White Sox (1927), and Cleveland Indians (1928). A former player at Ouachita Baptist University, Ward spent ten seasons as a reliable utility infielder for the Yankees under Bill Donovan and Miller Huggins, going to three straight World Series in 1921 (where he made a crucial error in Game 7 and sealed the game for the New York Giants getting thrown out at third base in Game 8), 1922 and 1923 (where he would get ten hits). Ward also was on the roster for the 1926 World Series, but did not play in a game for the team, having become a bench player in favor of Tony Lazzeri and Mark Koenig. Ward got the first hit for the Yankees on April 18, 1923, the opening of Yankee Stadium off Boston Red Sox pitcher Howard Ehmke. After several attempts in previous seasons, the Yankees traded Ward to the White Sox in December 1926, where he only lasted a season. The Indians claimed Ward off of waivers in March 1928 before releasing him in June 1928.

The son of an Arkansas politician, Ward also served in the Arkansas State Legislature as a reading clerk during the offseason. He also owned and managed the Class D New Iberia Cardinals of the Evangeline League from October 1945–February 1947. His son, Gene Ward, would also work in Minor League Baseball.

== Career ==
=== Minors and signing with the Yankees (1915–1917) ===
Ward played in 1916 for the Montgomery Rebels of the South Atlantic League. At Montgomery, Ward played in 93 games, hitting a .268 batting average and a .916 fielding percentage. The Little Rock Travelers sent Ward to Montgomery after some scouts thought the infielder had promise. Ward left the Montgomery team on June 26 to report to Little Rock, Arkansas to join the Arkansas National Guard. The Montgomery team folded during the 1916 season and the Rock Island Islanders of the Illinois–Indiana–Iowa League (Three–I League) picked up Ward for the rest of his 1916 season, where he hit .314 and had a .949 fielding percentage. Late in the season, he played a few games for the Travelers before heading for his home in Booneville, Arkansas.

In March 1917, he was supposed to play for the Travelers. When he arrived in Little Rock to report for Spring Training, he was told that the Charleston Sea Gulls of the South Atlantic League acquired his contract. Ward told the staff goodbye and took some of his bats he had left in the previous season at the stadium. The New York Yankees acquired his contract for $1,250 in July 1917 after Ward hit a .295 batting average with the Sea Gulls. Ward made his major league debut on August 14 as a replacement for Roger Peckinpaugh, who injured his arm. In his first game, he faced the Washington Senators pitcher Walter Johnson, getting his first career hit in his second at bat. Hughie Jennings, the manager of the Detroit Tigers thought that Ward was impressive in the short time period he played for the Yankees and that Ward would remain with the team.

=== Early playing days with the Yankees (1918–1921) ===
In August 1918, Ensign W.P. Hahn of the United States Navy's aviation division visited the Polo Grounds to discuss interest in joining the branch of military with players of the Yankees and Cleveland Indians. Wally Pipp had joined the branch a week earlier and began working at their division in Boston, Massachusetts. Tris Speaker of the Indians, Bill Lamar and Ward of the Yankees were all recruited for the naval aviation division. It was Pipp's suggestion that Ward and Lamar join the military and that neither would have to report before September 1, 1918. Due to low playing time from Miller Huggins, Ward left the team and reported to Camp Pike in North Little Rock, Arkansas for training, but was discharged from the military by the end of November 1918 along with Pipp.

Ward signed his 1919 contract to remain with the Yankees for the season and Huggins praised the young infielder, saying that the sure-fielding infielder would learn to hit better with continued experience in the majors. With the beginning of Spring Training in Jacksonville, Florida nearing, Huggins had to deal with concerns that Frank Baker, Johnny Jones and Del Pratt would not be on the 1919 team. Baker was considering retirement, Jones was still in military service, and Pratt was considering staying in the steel industry instead of continuing his career in baseball.

At a barnstorming game in Greenville, South Carolina on April 7, 1920, Ward collided with Chuck Ward of the Brooklyn Robins, sliding into second base on a retreat. Aaron Ward spiked Chuck Ward's right hand in multiple places, while Aaron Ward injured his right knee on the slide. Ward left South Carolina for New York City to have the leg looked at and was hopeful that his infielder would be able to play games between the two teams at Ebbets Field. Ward's first full season came in 1920 with the retirement of Baker, however. Ward got full playing time as a third baseman for the Yankees, becoming one of the regular clutch hitters on the Yankees.

Before reporting to Spring Training in 1921, Ward went into a holdout until the Yankees raised his pay, returning his 1921 contract unsigned to the club. One of several players to have holdouts during the winter of 1921, Ward got a second contract that had higher amounts than the first offer. This one was also sent back unsigned with a letter explaining his reasoning to the franchise. A third contract came in the mail to his liking in late February, which he signed and returned by mail to the Yankees. He announced he would be attending Spring Training in Shreveport, Louisiana in March. Ward moved to second base for the 1921 season and learned the position. His power rate went down in 1921. Ward had hit 11 home runs by the end of the 1920 season and by September 16, 1921, had only hit four. Ward's batting average also went to .321, a higher rate than the 1920 season. Writers considered Ward one of the best young infielders in the sport.

Ward, a reliable defender, had a bad play in Game 7 of the 1921 World Series against the New York Giants that cost the Yankees game. On a groundball from Johnny Rawlings with two out in the 7th inning, Ward bobbled it and his throw to Wally Pipp at first base was late, resulting in Rawlings being safe. Frank Snyder hit the next pitch from Carl Mays into the outfield for a double. Rawlings scored on the play. In Game 8, Frank Baker hit a liner in the ground that Rawlings corralled at second base. With Ward running from first, Rawlings threw to George Kelly at first base, retiring Baker. Kelly threw the ball to third base and Frankie Frisch. Frisch tagged Ward out to end the game and World Series while the infielder was sliding into third.

=== Regular player for the Yankees (1922–1926) ===
Ward held out in the beginning of the 1922 season for a higher paycheck as well. On March 7, 1922, he signed his Yankee contract for $7,500 (1922 USD) and began to report to New Orleans, Louisiana for Spring Training. Ward was one of 17 players during the 1922 Major League Baseball season to play in all 154 games. Ward hit two home runs during the 1922 World Series, a rematch of the previous year's teams, and in Game 4, Ward attempted to glove a ball by Irish Meusel in the heavy rain, but was unable to due to the poor conditions of the field.

The next season, 1923, Ward did not do a holdout and sent in his contract early.

Yankee Stadium opened on April 18, 1923 and with 74,200 in attendance to see the Yankees face the Boston Red Sox, Ward got the first hit recorded by a Yankees player in the new facility, off Howard Ehmke. Everett Scott, the Yankees captain, gave up a sacrifice to move Ward to second, but Ward got caught between second and third base in a rundown on a grounder by pitcher Bob Shawkey. Ward held in the rundown long enough for Shawkey to reach second base. Ward had the best production in the 1923 World Series, a third consecutive matchup between the Yankees and Giants, getting ten hits in the series. In the winning Game 6 for the Yankees, Ward got on a walk and scored on a double by Whitey Witt in the third inning.

In February 1924, the Chicago White Sox offered to trade Eddie Collins to the Yankees for Aaron Ward. However, Yankees management, led by Ed Barrow, refused to trade Ward for the infielder. Instead, the Yankees offered Everett Scott and Mike McNally to the in deal for the infielder. Ed Barrow told the press on his way to Boston with Jacob Ruppert to an American League meeting that Ward, along with Babe Ruth, Joe Dugan and Sad Sam Jones, were untouchable and that if the White Sox wanted a pitcher, they would need to send the Yankees a pitcher. They were offered Charlie Robertson, but wanted Ted Blankenship in 1923. In 1924, Barrow stated that he would take Robertson.

On May 26, 1924, Ward's 567 game straight playing streak dating to July 11, 1920 ended when he suffered an injury the game before. At the time, it was the longest streak behind teammate Everett Scott, who had been in 1,168 consecutive games as of that day. During that time period, Ward had a .280 batting average in 2,073 at bats, hitting 34 home runs and stealing 26 bases. Scott and Ward also played together for 346 consecutive games. Huggins announced in Boston in late June that Ward would return when the Yankees arrived in Philadelphia to play the Athletics. Ward's lack of presence caused the Yankees to struggle defensively, and sportswriters felt this return would amend things. However, rushing back to the majors before he was ready caused his numbers to struggle, along with the team, as they missed out on a fourth consecutive American League pennant.

Ward's playing time fell off during the 1926 season as his playing time went to rookies Tony Lazzeri and Mark Koenig, both new infielders. Despite the lost playing time in Spring Training, Ward remained confident that Huggins would give him a second chance to earn his place over the young rookies. The Chicago White Sox made another attempt to acquire Ward at the beginning of the 1926 regular season. Ward had been struggling with the Yankees in Spring Training and their game on April 22 did not go well for Ward during their victory over the Red Sox. Miller Huggins asked Ed Barrow to acquire outfielders Tom Gulley and Bill Barrett from the White Sox in return for Ward, along with a young catcher. Gulley would likely be sent to the St. Paul Saints of the American Association, a farm team for the Yankees. Ward would become the shortstop for the White Sox, replacing former teammate Everett Scott. Ward felt that his best position was shortstop because he felt uncomfortable at second base. Reports broke on May 6 that Huggins and current White Sox manager, Eddie Collins, had a handshake deal for a trade with Ward and Gulley changing teams. The Yankees wanted a left-handed pinch hitter on his bench and Collins wanted some insurance for Scott. However, the deal fell through with Tony Lazzeri struggling during mid-May with his defense.

In late July 1926, Ward got a chance to play for the Yankees when Huggins benched Koenig due to lack of performance. With Koenig making errors in the field and not hitting, Ward got a chance to spark the Yankees. However, in the 1926 World Series against the St. Louis Cardinals, Ward did not play in a single game over Koenig. Sportswriters felt that Ward would have been better than Koenig and though not a guarantee he would help them win the World Series, be an improvement over the rookie.

=== Career after the Yankees (1927–1947) ===
Ray Schalk, the new manager of the White Sox for the 1927 season, wanted a new infielder to replace Eddie Collins and one of his offers was to acquire Ward form the Yankees or Frank O'Rourke from the Tigers. The Yankees traded Ward to the Chicago White Sox on January 13, 1927 in a straight, no cash deal for catcher Johnny Grabowski and infielder Ray Morehart. After spending the 1927 season with the White Sox, the Cleveland Indians claimed Ward off waivers on March 4, 1928 prior to Spring Training in Shreveport, Louisiana. Ward would not see out the 1928 season with the Indians, as the team released him on June 10. The Toledo Mud Hens of the American Association signed Ward to a contract on June 30.

On January 15, 1929, the Arkansas State Legislature elected Ward as a reading clerk for the Arkansas State Senate, a position Ward previously held in 1919. He also signed with the Little Rock Travelers of the Southern Association in March 1929.

Ward returned to the baseball ranks in April 1946 with the revival of the Class D Evangeline League. Ward, now a resident of New Orleans, Louisiana, bought the team for $3,000 with a $750 forfeiture fee to ensure payment of players in October 1945. Ward and his wife, Sadie, would move to New Iberia to help with the operation of the team. Now the manager and owner of the New Iberia Cardinals, Ward introduced a resolution that teams in the league would have 18 players on the roster for the first 20 days of the season rather than the standard 15. However, on February 27, 1947 a group of four businessmen purchased the team from Ward for $10,000. Ward, who removed himself from the franchise in any capacity, stated that they had an agreement to play in New Orleans during the 1947 season and that the new ownership would honor the contract.

After selling the New Iberia franchise, Ward became a scout for the Pittsburgh Pirates for the Texas League.

== Personal life and death ==
Ward's father, Thomas, was a superintendent for a boys industrial school for children in the Fort Smith, Arkansas area, a local politician and a member of the Ku Klux Klan.

Ward and his wife, Sadie (née LeBlanc), had only one child, Gene Ward, born in 1927 in New Orleans. Gene Ward helped his father operate the New Iberia Cardinals, doing various roles, including concessions and front office work. After Aaron Ward sold the franchise, Gene moved to work at a hotel. He would spend the 1947 season working with the Birmingham Barons of the Southern Association as a traveling secretary, recommended by League President Charlie Hurth while the team was in New Orleans. In December 1947, Gene Ward became the business manager of the Class C Natchez Indians of the Cotton States League. By 1958, Aaron and Gene Ward were both operating a tire retreading station in New Orleans.

After dealing with a long illness, Ward died at the United States Department of Veterans Affairs hospital in New Orleans on January 30, 1961. He was 64 years old. His funeral was held the next day in New Orleans.

== In popular culture ==
In the Tom Cruise movie Jack Reacher, the title character uses the alias "Aaron Ward" when investigating at an Ohio gun range. Robert Duvall's character tells Cruise, "I'm pretty sure you didn't play second base for the Yankees in 1925."
