= Harvey Freeman (baseball) =

American football player (1897–1970)

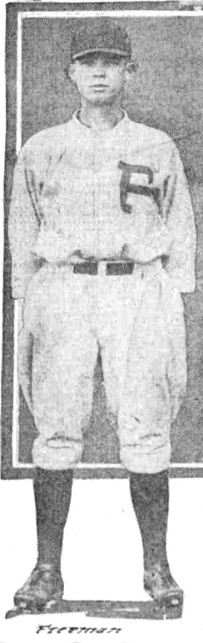
- Freeman in 1922
- Pitcher
- Born: December 22, 1897; Mottville, Michigan, U.S.
- Died: January 10, 1970 (aged 72); Kalamazoo, Michigan, U.S.
- Batted: Right Threw: Right

MLB debut
- July 10, 1921, for the Philadelphia Athletics

Last MLB appearance
- September 28, 1921, for the Philadelphia Athletics

MLB statistics
- Win–loss record: 1–4
- Earned run average: 7.69
- Strikeouts: 5
- Stats at Baseball Reference

Teams
- Philadelphia Athletics (1921)

Harvey Bayard Freeman (December 22, 1897 – January 10, 1970) was an American professional baseball pitcher. He played for the 1921 Philadelphia Athletics of Major League Baseball (MLB). Listed at 5 feet 10 inches (1.78 m) and 160 pounds (73 kg), he batted and threw right-handed.

== Biography ==
Freeman played college baseball and college football at Western State Normal School, now Western Michigan University, and was signed by Connie Mack of the Philadelphia Athletics in 1921. During 1921, his only major league season, Freeman pitched in 18 games (four starts) with the Athletics. He compiled a 1–4 win–loss record with a 7.69 earned run average (ERA) and five strikeouts in 48 innings pitched. His one win was a complete game victory on August 9, as the Athletics defeated the Cleveland Indians, 4–3. Freeman had a .083 batting average (1-for-12), while defensively he made no errors in 19 total chances for a 1.000 fielding percentage.

In May 1922, the Athletics sent Freeman to the minor league Portland Beavers of the Pacific Coast League as part of a multi-player trade. Baseball records show that Freeman played for three different minor league teams during 1922, did not play in 1923, returned in 1924 with the Syracuse Stars of the International League, then finished his professional baseball career with two teams during 1925. He pitched in 80 minor league games, accruing a 20–35 record.

Freeman went on to coach multiple sports at St. Augustine High School in Kalamazoo, Michigan, from 1925 to 1954, where his basketball teams won five state championship. He then worked in the lumber business. Freeman was inducted to the hall of fame of the Michigan High School Coaches Association in 1965. He was married, with two daughters and a son, and died in January 1970 in Kalamazoo.
