= Ed Barrow =

American baseball executive and manager (1868–1953)

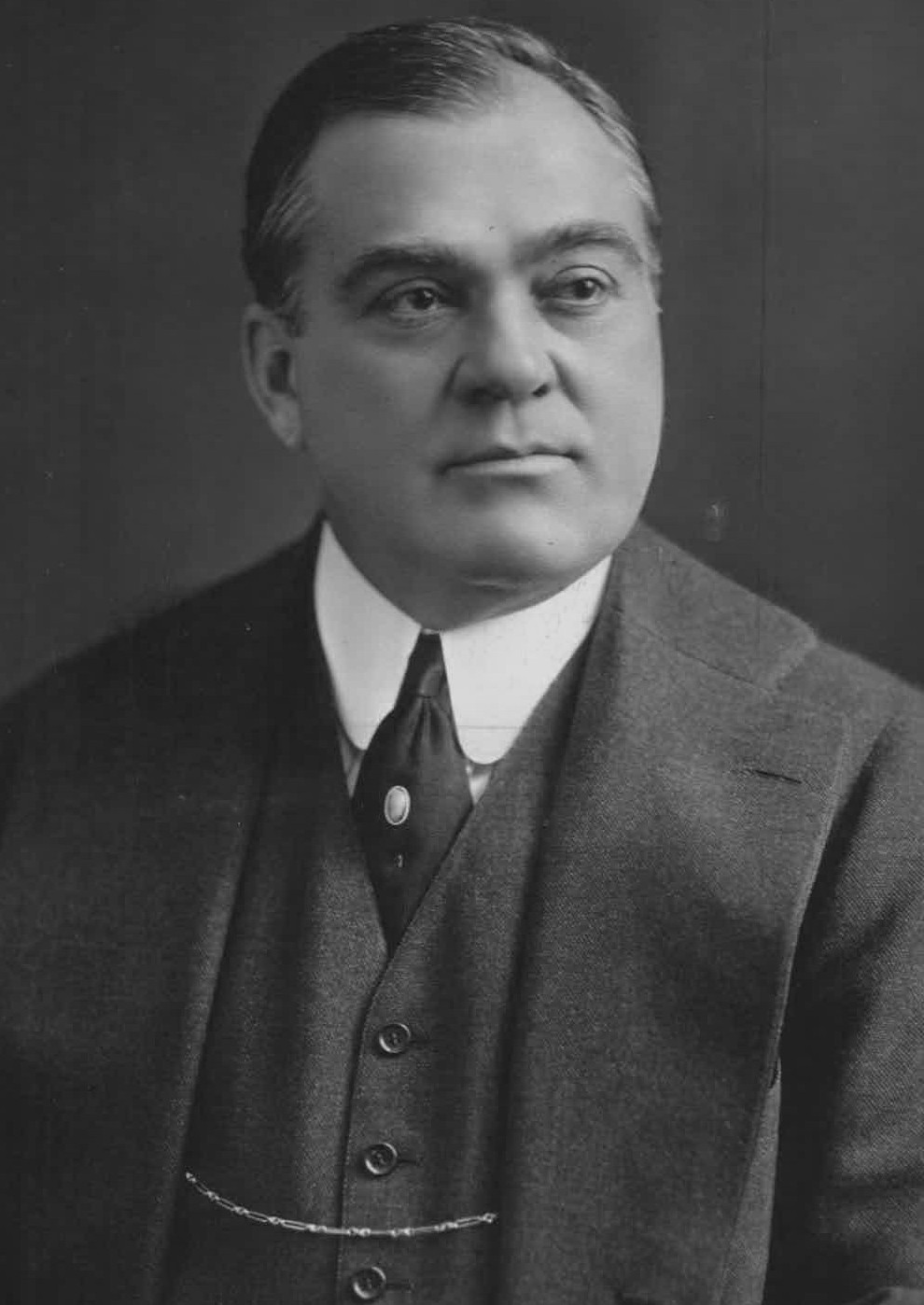
- Barrow in 1903
- Manager / Executive
- Born: May 10, 1868; Springfield, Illinois, U.S.
- Died: December 15, 1953 (aged 85); Port Chester, New York, U.S.

MLB statistics
- Managerial record: 310–320
- Winning %: .492
- Stats at Baseball Reference
- Managerial record at Baseball Reference

Teams
- As manager: Detroit Tigers (1903–1904); Boston Red Sox (1918–1920); As general manager: New York Yankees (1920–1939); As president: New York Yankees (1939–1945)

Career highlights and awards
- 11× World Series champion (1918, 1923, 1927, 1928, 1932, 1936–1939, 1941, 1943); Monument Park honoree

Member of the National

Baseball Hall of Fame
- Induction: 1953
- Election method: Veterans Committee

Edward Grant Barrow (May 10, 1868 – December 15, 1953) was an American manager and front office executive in Major League Baseball. He served as the field manager of the Detroit Tigers and Boston Red Sox. He served as business manager (de facto general manager) of the New York Yankees from 1921 to 1939 and as team president from 1939 to 1945, and is credited with building the Yankee dynasty. Barrow was elected to the Baseball Hall of Fame in 1953.

Born in a covered wagon in Springfield, Illinois, Barrow worked as a journalist and soap salesman before entering the business of baseball by selling concessions at games. From there, Barrow purchased minor league baseball teams, also serving as team manager, and served as president of the Atlantic League. After managing the Tigers in 1903 and 1904 and returning to the minor leagues, Barrow became disenchanted with baseball, and left the game to operate a hotel.

Barrow returned to baseball in 1910 as president of the Eastern League. After a seven-year tenure, Barrow managed the Red Sox from 1918 through 1920, leading the team to victory in the 1918 World Series. When Red Sox owner Harry Frazee began to sell his star players, Barrow joined the Yankees. During his quarter-century as their baseball operations chief, the Yankees won 14 AL pennants and 10 World Series titles.

== Early life ==
Edward Grant Barrow was born on May 10, 1868, in Springfield, Illinois, the oldest of four children, all male, born to Effie Ann Vinson-Heller and John Barrow. Barrow's father fought in the Ohio Volunteer Militia during the American Civil War. Following the war, Barrow's parents, with John's mother, brothers, and sisters, traveled in a covered wagon to Nebraska; Barrow was born on a hemp plantation belonging to relatives during the trip. The Barrows lived in Nebraska for six years before moving to Des Moines, Iowa. His middle name, Grant, was bestowed on him in honor of Ulysses S. Grant, the Civil War general.

Barrow worked as mailing clerk for the Des Moines News in 1887, receiving a promotion to circulation manager within a year. He became a reporter for the Des Moines Leader after graduating from high school. He became city editor, earning $35 a week ($1,254 in current dollar terms). In his last two years living in Des Moines, Barrow established a baseball team, which included future baseball stars Fred Clarke, Ducky Holmes, and Herm McFarland.

Barrow moved to Pittsburgh in 1889, where he worked as a soap salesman, believing there was money in this business. However, Barrow lost all of money in this business, and went to work as a desk clerk in a Pittsburgh hotel.

== Baseball career ==
=== Early career ===
Barrow partnered with Harry Stevens in 1894 to sell concessions at baseball games. He helped George Moreland form the Interstate League, a Class-C minor league, in 1894. Barrow, with Stevens and Al Buckenberger, purchased the Wheeling Nailers of the Interstate League in 1896. Barrow served as field manager until the collapse of the league that season. The team continued in the Iron and Oil League for the rest of the year.

Barrow then bought the Paterson Silk Weavers of the Class-A Atlantic League, managing them for the rest of the 1896 season. Barrow discovered Honus Wagner throwing lumps of coal at a railroad station in Pennsylvania, and signed him to his first professional contract. Barrow sold Wagner to the Louisville Colonels of the National League (NL) for $2,100 the next year ($81,270 in current dollar terms). With poor attendance, Barrow brought in professional boxers as a draw: he had James J. Corbett play first base while John L. Sullivan and James J. Jeffries umpired. He also hired Lizzie Arlington, the first woman in professional baseball, to pitch a few innings a game.

From 1897 through 1899, Barrow served as president of the Atlantic League. During this time, in the winter of 1898–99, Barrow and Jake Wells established a movie theater in Richmond, Virginia. Barrow managed Paterson again in 1899, but the league folded after the season.

With the money earned from the sale of the Richmond movie theater, Barrow purchased a one-quarter share of the Toronto Maple Leafs of the Class-A Eastern League in 1900 from Arthur Irwin, and served as the team's manager. Irwin, hired to be the manager of the Washington Senators of the NL, brought his most talented players with him. Rebuilding the Maple Leafs, Barrow acquired talented players, such as Nick Altrock, and the team improved from a fifth-place finish in 1899, to a third-place finish in 1900, and a second-place finish in 1901. The Maple Leafs won the league championship in 1902, even though they lost many of their most talented players, including Altrock, to the upstart American League (AL).

== Managerial career ==
Barrow managed in the major leagues with the Detroit Tigers of the AL in 1903, finishing fifth, a 13-game improvement from their 1902 finish. With the Tigers, Barrow feuded with shortstop Kid Elberfeld. Tigers' owner Sam Angus sold the team to William H. Yawkey before the 1904 season. Barrow managed the Tigers again in 1904, but unable to coexist with Frank Navin, Yawkey's secretary-treasurer, Barrow tendered his resignation. He then managed the Montreal Royals of the Eastern League for the rest of the season. He managed the Indianapolis Indians of the Class-A American Association in 1905 and Toronto in 1906. Disheartened with baseball after finishing in last place, Barrow hired Joe Kelley to manage Toronto in 1907, and after signing the rest of the team's players, became manager of the Windsor Arms Hotel in Toronto.

=== Return to baseball ===
Barrow returned to baseball in 1910, managing Montreal. The Eastern League hired Barrow as its president the next year, giving him an annual salary of $7,500 ($259,152 in current dollar terms). He served in this role from 1911 through 1917, and engineered the name change to "International League" before the 1912 season. As league president, he contended with the creation of the Federal League in 1914, which competed as a major league, and established franchises in International League cities, including Newark, New Jersey, Buffalo, New York, and Baltimore, Maryland. He attempted to gain major league status for the league in 1914, but was unsuccessful. When the Federal League collapsed, Barrow was the only league president to forbid the outlaw players from playing in his league.

After the 1917 season, Barrow attempted to organize the "Union League", to compete against the AL and NL as a third major league, by merging four International League clubs with four teams from the American Association. Several International League owners opposed Barrow's policies, including his attempt to form the Union League, and felt he was too close personally to Ban Johnson. When the league's owners voted to cut his pay to $2,500 after the 1917 season ($62,825 in current dollar terms), Barrow resigned.

=== Boston Red Sox (1918–1920) ===
Barrow became manager of the Boston Red Sox in 1918. As the team lost many of its better players during World War I, Barrow encouraged owner Harry Frazee to purchase Stuffy McInnis, Wally Schang, Bullet Joe Bush, and Amos Strunk from the Philadelphia Athletics for $75,000 ($1,605,365 in current dollar terms). During the season, Barrow feuded with his assistant, Johnny Evers, who undermined Barrow's leadership. The Red Sox won the 1918 World Series. Recognizing that star pitcher Babe Ruth was also a great power hitter, Barrow had Ruth pinch hit on days when he wasn't scheduled to pitch. When Ruth told Barrow that he could only pitch or hit, Barrow decided that Ruth's bat was more useful than his pitching, and transitioned him from a pitcher into an outfielder.

After the 1918 season, Frazee, now in debt, began selling the contracts of star players. He traded Dutch Leonard, Duffy Lewis, and Ernie Shore to the New York Yankees, obtaining Ray Caldwell, Slim Love, Frank Gilhooley, Roxy Walters, and cash. Frazee sold Carl Mays to the Yankees during the 1919 season. The Red Sox struggled in 1919, finishing sixth in the AL. Frazee sold Ruth to the Yankees after the season, against Barrow's warnings. The Red Sox finished in fifth in 1920.

To date, Barrow is the only manager to win a World Series without previously playing in organized baseball, whether in the minors or majors.

== Executive career ==
=== New York Yankees (1920–1945) ===
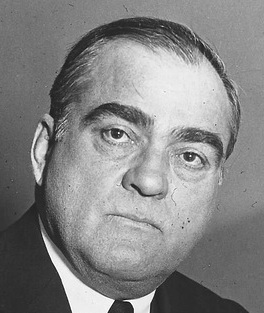
Barrow in 1924

After the 1920 season, Barrow resigned from the Red Sox to become the business manager of the Yankees, replacing the deceased Harry Sparrow. He took control of building the roster, which was usually the field manager's responsibility in those days. With the Yankees, Barrow handled the signing of player contracts, although owner Jacob Ruppert personally handled the contracts of Ruth and Lou Gehrig.

Barrow installed himself in the Yankees' infrastructure between co-owner Tillinghast L'Hommedieu Huston and manager Miller Huggins, as Huston frequently criticized Huggins. Barrow told Huggins: "You're the manager, and you'll not be second guessed by me. Your job is to win; mine is to get you the players you need to win." When Huggins suspended Ruth indefinitely on August 29, 1925, for "misconduct off the playing field", while also fining him $5,000 ($91,793 in current dollar terms), Barrow supported Huggins.

In his first move with the Yankees, Barrow brought Red Sox coach Paul Krichell with him to New York as a scout. He purchased a share in the club in 1924. He also discovered executive George Weiss, whom he mentored. Barrow also orchestrated a series of trades with his former club, mainly to keep Frazee afloat. These trades netted the Yankees such stars as Bullet Joe Bush, Joe Dugan and George Pipgras. It has been argued that these trades only looked lopsided in favor of the Yankees only because the players sent to Boston suffered a rash of injuries. However, this is belied by the fact that Barrow almost certainly knew who was coming to New York in these deals; he'd managed nearly all of them in Boston.

The Yankees sought to develop their own players, rather than buying them from other teams, especially after the investment of $100,000 ($1,853,448 in current dollar terms) in Lyn Lary and Jimmie Reese in 1927. However, Weiss and Bill Essick convinced Barrow to approve the purchase of Joe DiMaggio from the Pacific Coast League.

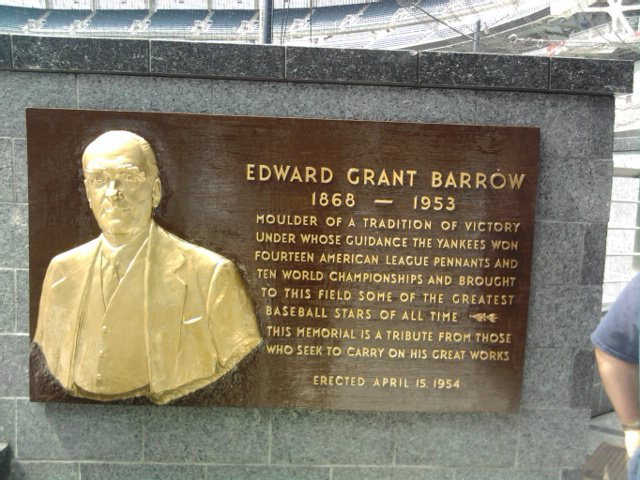
Barrow's plaque in Monument Park in Yankee Stadium.

Barrow was considered a potential successor to AL president Ban Johnson in 1927, but Barrow declared that he was not interested in the job. When Huggins died in 1929, Barrow chose Bob Shawkey to replace him as manager, passing over Ruth, who wanted the opportunity to become a player-manager. Barrow also effectively blackballed Ruth from MLB's managerial ranks by suggesting to executives of other teams that Ruth was not equipped to manage a baseball team. Although Ruth and Barrow had been together for all but one season from 1918 to 1934, the two never got along. The Sporting News named Barrow their Executive of the Year in 1937.

After Ruppert's death in 1939, his will left the Yankees and other assets in a trust for his descendants. The will also named Barrow president of the Yankees, with full authority over the team's day-to-day operations. Barrow was named Executive of the Year by The Sporting News in 1941, the second time he won the award. The estate sold the team to a group of Larry MacPhail, Dan Topping, and Del Webb in 1945, and Barrow sold his 10% stake in the team to the group. Barrow remained as chairman of the board and an informal adviser. Though he signed a five-year contract to remain with the team, he exercised a clause in his contract to free himself as of December 31, 1946, in order to officially retire from baseball. AL president Will Harridge offered Barrow the job of Commissioner of Baseball to succeed Kenesaw Mountain Landis; Barrow declined, as he felt he was too old and his health was in decline.

== Baseball records ==
=== Managerial record ===
Team	Year	Regular season					Postseason			
Team	Year	Games	Won	Lost	Win %	Finish	Won	Lost	Win %	Result
DET	1903	136	65	71	.478	5th in AL	–	–	–	–
DET	1904	78	32	46	.410	resigned	–	–	–	–
DET total		214	97	117	.453		0	0	–	
BOS	1918	126	75	51	.595	1st in AL	4	2	.667	Won World Series (CHC)
BOS	1919	137	66	71	.482	6th in AL	–	–	–	–
BOS	1920	153	72	81	.471	5th in AL	–	–	–	–
BOS total		416	213	203	.512		4	2	.667	
Total		630	310	320	.492		4	2	.667	

=== Record as general manager ===
Team	Year	Regular season					Postseason			
Team	Year	Games	Won	Lost	Win %	Finish	Won	Lost	Win %	Result
NYY	1921	154	98	55	.641	1st in AL	3	5	.375	Lost World Series (NYG)
NYY	1922	154	94	60	.610	1st in AL	0	4	.000	Lost World Series (NYG)
NYY	1923	154	98	54	.645	1st in AL	4	2	.667	Won World Series (NYG)
NYY	1924	154	89	63	.586	2nd in AL	–	–	–	–
NYY	1925	154	69	85	.448	7th in AL	–	–	–	–
NYY	1926	154	91	63	.591	1st in AL	3	4	.429	Lost World Series (STL)
NYY	1927	154	110	44	.714	1st in AL	4	0	1.000	Won World Series (PIT)
NYY	1928	154	101	53	.656	1st in AL	4	0	1.000	Won World Series (STL)
NYY	1929	154	88	66	.571	2nd in AL	–	–	–	–
NYY	1930	154	86	68	.558	3rd in AL	–	–	–	–
NYY	1931	154	94	59	.614	2nd in AL	–	–	–	–
NYY	1932	154	107	47	.695	1st in AL	4	0	1.000	Won World Series (CHC)
NYY	1933	154	91	59	.607	2nd in AL	–	–	–	–
NYY	1934	154	94	60	.610	2nd in AL	–	–	–	–
NYY	1935	154	89	60	.597	2nd in AL	–	–	–	–
NYY	1936	154	102	51	.667	1st in AL	4	2	.667	Won World Series (NYG)
NYY	1937	154	102	52	.662	1st in AL	4	1	.800	Won World Series (NYG)
NYY	1938	154	99	53	.651	1st in AL	4	0	1.000	Won World Series (CHC)
NYY	1939	154	106	45	.702	1st in AL	4	0	1.000	Won World Series (CIN)
NYY	1940	154	88	66	.571	2nd in AL	–	–	–	–
NYY	1941	154	101	53	.656	1st in AL	4	1	.800	Won World Series (BKN)
NYY	1942	154	103	51	.669	1st in AL	1	4	.200	Lost World Series (STL)
NYY	1943	154	98	56	.636	1st in AL	4	1	.800	Won World Series (STL)
NYY	1944	154	83	71	.539	3rd in AL	–	–	–	–
Total		3,696	2,281	1,394	.621		36	22	.621	

== Personal life ==
Barrow was known as "Uncle Egbert" to his friends; according to writer Tom Meany, Babe Ruth referred to him as "Barrows," treating him as if he were "a butler in an English drawing room comedy." He resided in Rye, New York. He first married in 1898, but did not discuss it in any of his writings. His second marriage was to Fannie Taylor Briggs in January 1912; he raised her five-year-old daughter from her previous marriage, Audrey, as his own daughter.

Barrow was an able boxer. He once fought John L. Sullivan in an exhibition for four rounds.

Barrow was hospitalized on July 7, 1953, at the United Hospital of Port Chester, New York and died on December 15, at the age of 85, due to a malignancy. His body was kept at Campbell's Funeral Home and interred in Kensico Cemetery in Valhalla, Westchester County, New York.

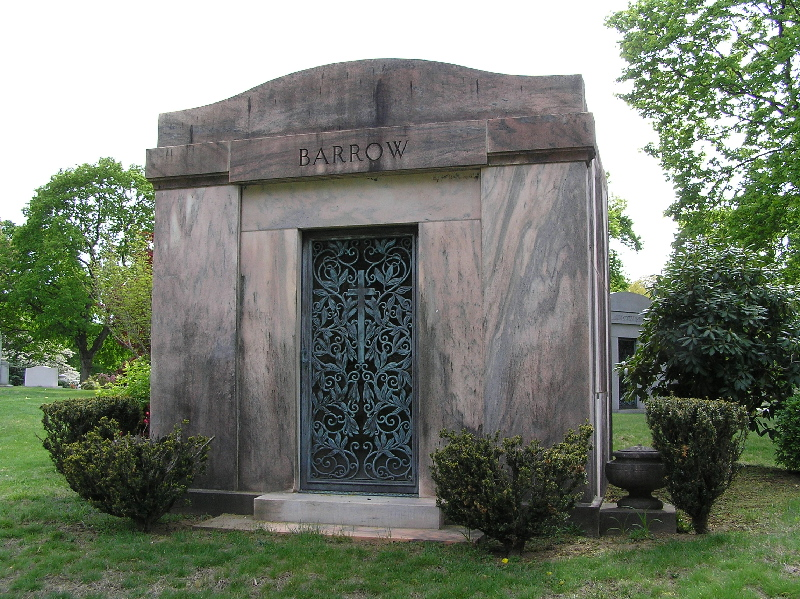
Ed Barrow's mausoleum in Kensico Cemetery

== Legacy ==
Barrow was the first executive to put numbers on player uniforms. He also announced the retirement of Lou Gehrig's uniform number, the first number to be retired. Barrow was also the first executive to allow fans to keep foul balls that entered the stands. Barrow was also the first to require the playing of "The Star-Spangled Banner", the United States' national anthem, before every game, not only on holidays.

In May 1950, an exhibition game was played in honor of Barrow, with Barrow managing a team of retired stars. Barrow was named on the Honor Rolls of Baseball in 1946 and elected to the National Baseball Hall of Fame by the Veterans Committee in 1953.

On April 15, 1954, the Yankees dedicated a plaque to Barrow; the plaque first hung on the center field wall at Yankee Stadium, near the flagpole and the monuments to Babe Ruth, Lou Gehrig and Miller Huggins. The plaques were later moved to the stadium's Monument Park.
