= Arlas Taylor =

American baseball player (1896–1958)

- Pitcher
- Born: March 16, 1896; Warrick County, Indiana
- Died: September 10, 1958 (aged 62); Dade City, Florida
- Batted: Right Threw: Left

MLB debut
- September 15, 1921, for the Philadelphia Athletics

Last MLB appearance
- September 15, 1921, for the Philadelphia Athletics

MLB statistics
- Win–loss record: 0–1
- Earned run average: 22.50
- Strikeouts: 1
- Stats at Baseball Reference

Teams
- Philadelphia Athletics (1921)

Arlas Walter "Foxy" Taylor (March 16, 1896 – September 10, 1958) was a Major League Baseball pitcher who played in 1921 with the Philadelphia Athletics.
