= Whitey Witt =

American baseball player

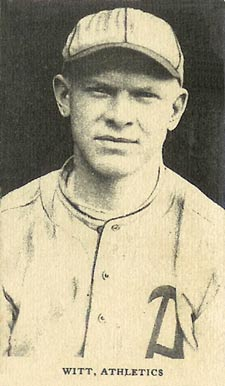
- Outfielder
- Born: September 28, 1895; Orange, Massachusetts, U.S.
- Died: July 14, 1988 (aged 92); Alloway Township, New Jersey, U.S.
- Batted: Left Threw: Right

MLB debut
- April 12, 1916, for the Philadelphia Athletics

Last MLB appearance
- August 18, 1926, for the Brooklyn Robins

MLB statistics
- Batting average: .287
- Home runs: 18
- Runs batted in: 300
- Stats at Baseball Reference

Teams
- Philadelphia Athletics (1916–1917, 1919–1921); New York Yankees (1922–1926); Brooklyn Robins (1926)

Career highlights and awards
- World Series champion (1923)

Lawton Walter "Whitey" Witt (born Ladislaw Waldemar Wittkowski; September 28, 1895 – July 14, 1988) was an American professional baseball outfielder. He played all or part of ten seasons in Major League Baseball (MLB) with the Philadelphia Athletics, New York Yankees, and Brooklyn Robins. In his career, he hit .287 (1,195-for-4,171) with 18 home runs and 300 runs batted in. He was the last surviving person to have played on the 1923 New York Yankees championship team, having taken the first at bat at the then-new Yankee Stadium for the Yankees.

Witt was knocked unconscious in the ninth inning by a thrown soda bottle from right field bleachers in Sportsman's Park in St. Louis on September 16, 1922. The soda bottle struck Witt in the forehead while backing up Bob Meusel on a flyout by Eddie Foster. Witt's teammates and St. Louis Browns outfielder Ken Williams carried the unconscious Witt off the field. The Yankees were locked in a tight pennant race with the Browns that year. The person who threw the bottle from the stands was never identified, though the Yankees and Witt came back to win the series (thanks to a key hit by Witt) defeating the Browns by one game for the pennant.

After retiring from baseball following the 1928 season, Witt and his wife returned home to a farmhouse in Alloway Township, New Jersey. He opened a bar, known as Whitey's Irish Bar, in Salem in 1928 and operated it until 1945. After selling the bar and investing the monetary proceeds, he would spend most of his retirement golfing and serve as a member of the American Legion post in Woodstown. He died at his home on July 14, 1988 after suffering a heart attack at his home in Alloway Township at the age of 92.

== Early years ==
Witt played local baseball in St. Johnsbury, Vermont during the 1915 season after graduating from the Goddard Seminary, having come to Barre, Vermont, from Winchendon, Massachusetts in 1912. At Goddard he was a four-sport athlete, playing baseball, basketball, ice hockey and football. He served as captain of the baseball team twice and once as the captain of the football team. He also served on the track team. At the time of signing, Witt was known for his speed, running 300 feet (91 m) in ten seconds.

Billy Leonard, friend of Philadelphia Athletics manager Connie Mack from Boston, Massachusetts tipped off the team about the quality infielder while Witt played in the Maine Summer League for a hotel team in Skowhegan, Maine. The Athletics sent Harry Davis, a first baseman and scout for the Athletics, to go watch Witt in person. Davis was impressed by Witt's performance that he offered Witt a two-year, $1,800 (1915 USD) contract on the spot and stayed three more weeks to see if Witt was worth the contract. George Stallings of the Boston Braves noted in late October 1915 that they had considered going after Witt in 1913. Billy Leonard, the manager of the Boston Reds, an independent barnstorming team, saw Witt play in person. Leonard told Stallings that he was impressed with Witt, but Stallings requested that Witt report to the Braves during the Goddard Seminary season, a request Witt refused. John McGraw of the New York Giants also attempted to sign Witt, but did not want to leave St. Johnsbury either for the Giants.

Witt would begin to attend Bowdoin College as a freshman in September 1915. He left the college to pursue his major league career after October 6.

== Professional career ==
=== September 1922 bottle throwing incident ===
In mid-September 1922, the Yankees were locked in a pennant race with the St. Louis Browns. On September 16, the two teams began a series at Sportsman's Park, in which 30,000 fans came into the stadium, considered the largest crowd in the history of St. Louis baseball. Much of the crowd were excited during the game and when George Sisler appeared, they got louder. During the game, Bob Shawkey out-pitched Urban Shocker and any time Sisler battered the crowds got loud. During the ninth inning, Eddie Foster of the Browns hit a ball to center field, with Bob Meusel and Witt both chasing after it. Meusel caught the ball and Witt got into position to back up his teammate. A fan in the right field bleachers threw a bottle of Coca-Cola into the field and it struck Witt in the forehead. The impact rendered Witt unconscious, collapsing on the field. His teammates Wally Pipp and Aaron Ward along with Browns outfielder Ken Williams carried the unconscious Witt off the field. The fans stormed the field after Witt got hurt, but were corralled by police on horseback in the stadium. The Yankees won the first game in the series.

Witt woke up while in the clubhouse and Miller Huggins showed him the bottle that struck him. Witt confirmed that there was a flash in front of him. Witt told the press that he felt the fan was trying to interrupt the direction of the ball and not strike the Yankees' center fielder. Dr. Robert Hyland, the doctor for the Browns, visited Witt at the hospital that night, diagnosing him with some lacerations and contusions on his scalp and said he could play within the next game or two.

Response to the thrown bottle was immediate. The owner of the Browns, Phil Ball, offered apologies for the actions of the fans against the Yankees outfield, noting that they wanted to win games the right way and not through poor sportsmanship. Ball offered a $500 reward for the capture and conviction of the bottle-thrower, backed up by $50 more from the Pennant Rooters' Club. Early rumors was that the bottle thrower was a 20 or 21-year old male. Tillinghast L'Hommedieu Huston, one of the owners of the Yankees, took evidence and stated that the he planned to make a formal complaint to American League president Ban Johnson. Joseph Walsh, the deputy United States District Court clerk, announced on September 18 that a 10-year old child had thrown the bottle and disappeared into the crowd.

Witt made his return on the field on the September 18 game between the two teams. With the Browns leading by two runs, Joe Dugan hit a double and Pipp scored him after a ball hit Dixie Davis's glove and an error by Marty McManus. Wally Schang followed with a single past Davis and outracing him to first base. Huggins had Elmer Smith pinch hit for Aaron Ward to which Browns manager Lee Fohl took Davis out for Hub Pruett. In response to the pitcing change, Huggins pulled Smith in favor of Mike McNally, who attempted to sacrifice bunt to advance the runners. However, the bunt attempt failed with Hank Severeid throwing to third base and throwing out Pipp. The Browns followed by walking Everett Scott to load the bases. Fohl replaced Pruett with Urban Shocker, who got Bullet Joe Bush to hit a grounder, cutting Schang down at the plate. Witt, with a large bandage on his head from the bottle incident, hit a ball to center field, scoring McNally and Scott, resulting in a two-run lead for the Yankees. The Yankees would win the game in the next inning after Bush retired Sisler, Williams and Baby Doll Jacobson.
