= Shags Horan =

American baseball player

- Outfielder
- Born: September 6, 1895; St. Louis, Missouri, U.S.
- Died: February 13, 1969 (aged 73); Torrance, California, U.S.
- Batted: Right Threw: Right

MLB debut
- July 14, 1924, for the New York Yankees

Last MLB appearance
- September 18, 1924, for the New York Yankees

MLB statistics
- Batting average: .290
- Home runs: 0
- Runs batted in: 7
- Stats at Baseball Reference

Teams
- New York Yankees (1924)

Joseph Patrick "Shags" Horan (September 6, 1895 – February 13, 1969) was an American outfielder in Major League Baseball. Horan played for the New York Yankees in 1924, and he also spent 11 seasons in the minor leagues, winning two batting titles. He was 5 feet, 10 inches tall and weighed 170 pounds.

== Career ==
Horan was born in St. Louis, Missouri, in 1895. He started his professional baseball career in 1914 in the Kentucky–Illinois–Tennessee League. That season, he played 124 games and had a batting average of .272. From 1915 to 1921, Horan had stints in several minor leagues but did not play more than 87 games during any of those years.

Horan then joined the Western League's Des Moines Boosters in 1922, batted over .300 for the first time, and hit 16 home runs. The following season, he batted .411 with 23 homers to set career-highs in both categories. He also led the Western League in batting average and hits (256).

In 1924, Horan started off with the Reading Keystones of the class AA International League. He batted .376 to lead the league before his contract was sold to the New York Yankees in mid-season. Horan appeared in 22 games for the Yankees in July, August, and September of that year. He hit .290 with seven runs batted in and no home runs. New York waived him after the season ended, and about his time in the majors, Horan later said:

"I don't care for those concrete fences. The ball hits them and you don't hear anything. In the minors you rattle 'em off those wooden fences and you stir up quite a racket."

Horan played in the Western League and Pacific Coast League for the next two seasons before his professional baseball career ended. He then settled in Los Angeles and worked as a guard for the L.A. Department of Water and Power. Horan died in Torrance, California, in 1969.
