= Miller Huggins =

American baseball player and manager (1878–1929)

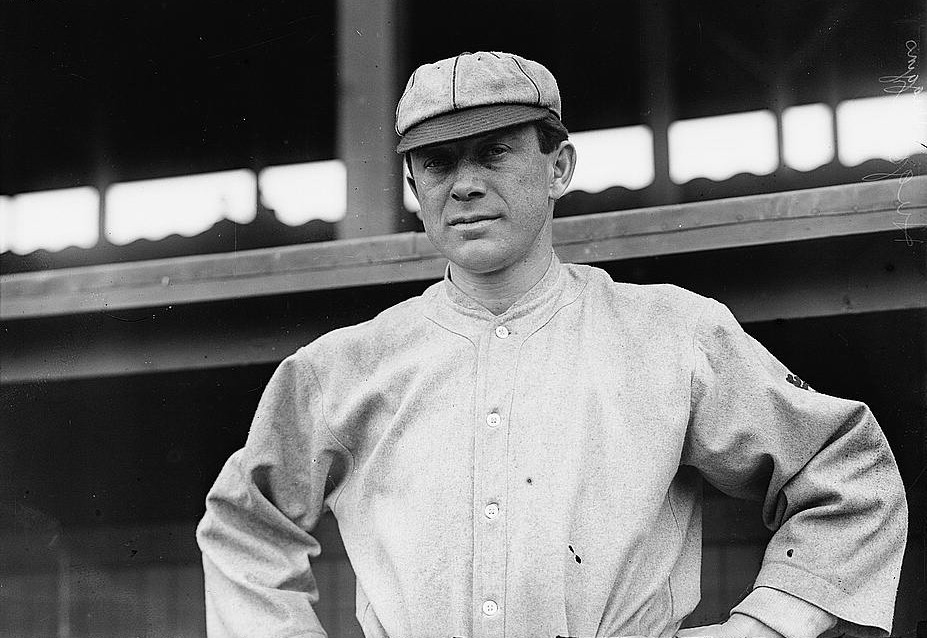
- Huggins with the St. Louis Cardinals in 1910
- Second baseman / Manager
- Born: March 27, 1878; Cincinnati, Ohio, U.S.
- Died: September 25, 1929 (aged 51); New York City, New York, U.S.
- Batted: Switch Threw: Right

MLB debut
- April 15, 1904, for the Cincinnati Reds

Last MLB appearance
- September 13, 1916, for the St. Louis Cardinals

MLB statistics
- Batting average: .265
- Home runs: 9
- Runs batted in: 318
- Stolen bases: 324
- Managerial record: 1,413–1,134–23
- Winning %: .555
- Stats at Baseball Reference
- Managerial record at Baseball Reference

Teams
- As player: Cincinnati Reds (1904–1909); St. Louis Cardinals (1910–1916); As manager: St. Louis Cardinals (1913–1917); New York Yankees (1918–1929)

Career highlights and awards
- 3× World Series champion (1923, 1927, 1928); Monument Park honoree

Member of the National

Baseball Hall of Fame
- Induction: 1964
- Election method: Veterans Committee

Miller James Huggins (March 27, 1878 – September 25, 1929) was an American professional baseball player and manager. Huggins played second base for the Cincinnati Reds (1904–1909) and St. Louis Cardinals (1910–1916). He managed the Cardinals (1913–1917) and New York Yankees (1918–1929), including the Murderers' Row teams of the 1920s that won six American League (AL) pennants and three World Series championships.

Huggins was born in Cincinnati. He received a degree in law from the University of Cincinnati, where he was also captain on the baseball team. Rather than serve as a lawyer, Huggins chose to pursue a professional baseball career. He played semi-professional and minor league baseball from 1898 through 1903, at which time he signed with the Reds.

As a player, Huggins was adept at getting on base. He was also an excellent fielding second baseman, earning the nicknames "Rabbit", "Little Everywhere", and "Mighty Mite" for his defensive prowess and was later considered an intelligent manager who understood the fundamentals of the game. Despite fielding successful teams for the Yankees in the 1920s, he continued to make personnel changes in order to maintain his teams' superiority in the AL. He was elected to the National Baseball Hall of Fame by the Veterans Committee in 1964.

== Early life ==
Miller James Huggins was born on March 27, 1878, (Note: Several other sources give his birth date as March 27, 1878 or 1879 or 1880. His New York Times obituary states that he was born "on April 19, 1879, according to the family records".) in Cincinnati, Ohio, where his father, an Englishman, worked as a grocer. His mother was a native of Cincinnati. He had two brothers and one sister.

Huggins attended Woodward High School and Walnut Hills High School, both in Cincinnati.

== College career ==
"You can become a pleader or a player, not both. Try baseball. You seem to like it better."

— William Howard Taft to Huggins at the University of Cincinnati

Huggins attended the University of Cincinnati, where he studied law and played college baseball for the Cincinnati Bearcats baseball team. A shortstop, he was named team captain of the Bearcats in 1900. Seeing him consumed with baseball, his law professors summoned him to justify why they should keep him in the law program.

Huggins' father, a devout Methodist, objected to his son playing baseball on Sundays. But Huggins played semi-professional baseball in 1898 for the Cincinnati Shamrocks, a team organized by Julius Fleischmann, where he played under the pseudonym "Proctor" due to his father's opposition and his amateur status. In 1900, he played for Fleischmann's semiprofessional team based in the Catskill Mountains, the Mountain Tourists, leading the team with a .400 batting average.

After receiving his law degree from Cincinnati, Huggins realized that he could make even more money playing baseball, and as such William Howard Taft, one of Huggins' law professors, advised him to play baseball. He was admitted to the bar, but never practiced law.

== Professional career ==
=== Minor leagues ===
Huggins began his playing career in minor league baseball with the Mansfield Haymakers of the Class B Interstate League in 1899. He continued his minor league apprenticeship with the St. Paul Saints of the Western League and American Association from 1901 through 1903. After starting his career as an exclusively right-handed hitter, he began to bat from the left side in 1902 in response to his offensive struggles in the 1901 season while also moving to second base during his time at St. Paul.

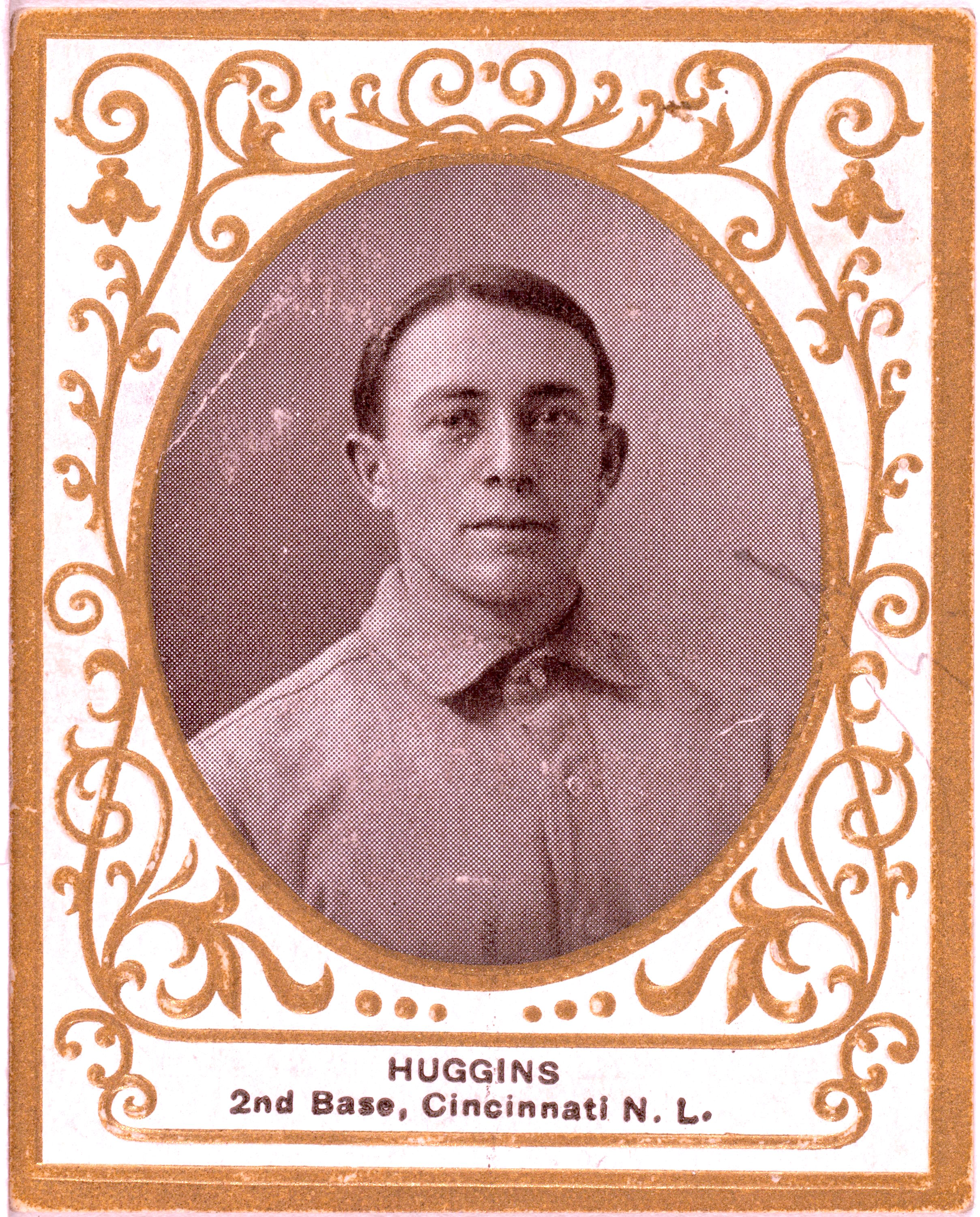
Miller Huggins' 1909 baseball card

Huggins handled 19 fielding chances, 11 putouts, and nine assists, without committing an error in a game with the Saints in 1902; the previous Major League Baseball (MLB) record being 18, set by Fred Dunlap in 1882. In 1903, he pulled off the first delayed steal in recorded baseball history. Fleischmann, part-owner of the Cincinnati Reds of the National League (NL), kept an eye on Huggins while he played for St. Paul.

=== Cincinnati Reds (1904–1909) ===
The Reds duly purchased his contract from the Saints before the 1904 season. He made his MLB debut on April 15, 1904, and proved very adept at getting on base. He batted .264 with the Reds that season and improved in the 1906 season, finishing with a .292 batting average and 41 stolen bases, while spending considerable time developing his upper-body strength.

Although Huggins hoped to be selected as Ned Hanlon's successor as Cincinnati's manager after the 1907 season, the Reds instead went with John Ganzel. In 1908, he played with the Reds in the Cuban-American Major League Clubs Series. Hampered by a broken ankle and torn ligaments in his shoulder, he slumped to .209 in 1909.

=== St. Louis Cardinals (1910–1917) ===
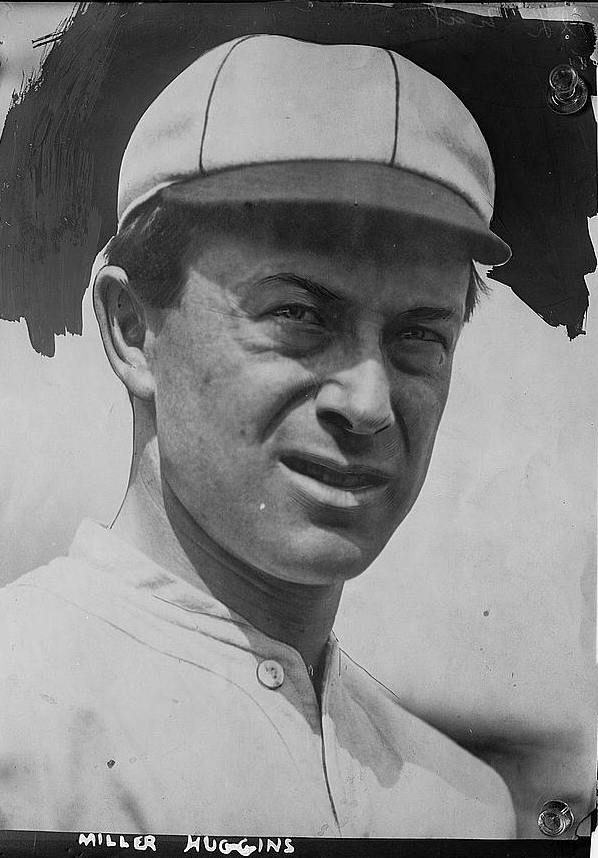
Huggins with the St. Louis Cardinals in 1912

Before the 1910 season, the Reds traded Huggins, along with Frank Corridon and Rebel Oakes, to the St. Louis Cardinals in return for Fred Beebe and Alan Storke. He set an MLB record on June 1, 1910, with six plate appearances but no at bats, with four walks and two sacrifice flies. In the same year, he batted .265 for the Cardinals and led the NL in walks.

On July 13, 1911, he tied the NL record for successful fielding chances in a game with 16. At the end of the season, he finished sixth in the voting for the Chalmers Award for Most Valuable Player. In 1912, he hit over .300 for the first time in his career. Huggins became player-manager for the Cardinals after the 1912 season, succeeding Roger Bresnahan. Team owner Helene Hathaway Britton preferred Huggins' "gentlemanly" manner over Bresnahan's rougher personality.

With the acquisition of speed in a trade with the Pittsburgh Pirates, including Dots Miller, Art Butler, Cozy Dolan and Chief Wilson, the Cardinals contended for the NL pennant in 1914. Finishing in third place, it was the Cardinals' best finish since 1876, but they fell back to sixth in 1915 and last in 1916. When Britton sold the team after that season, she offered Huggins a chance to buy a part of the team. While he was attempting to raise money from the Fleischmann family, Britton sold the team to a group headed by Samuel Breadon, who hired Branch Rickey to run the team's day-to-day operations in the front office.

Huggins had coached the young Rogers Hornsby, helping him to correct his batting stance, and Hornsby duly succeeded him as the team's starting second baseman in 1917 as Huggins ended his playing career. He managed the team during 1917, the last year of his contract, but was not retained.

== Managerial career ==
=== New York Yankees (1918–1929) ===
With the New York Yankees of the American League (AL) not performing well, Yankees owners Jacob Ruppert and Tillinghast L'Hommedieu Huston sought to replace "Wild" Bill Donovan as manager. Ban Johnson, AL president, suggested Huggins to Ruppert as a replacement for Donovan. Huston, who had been in Europe at the time that Ruppert had made the appointment, disliked Huggins and wanted to hire Wilbert Robinson, his drinking buddy. Ruppert himself had been put off by Huggins' wool cap and practice of smoking pipes in public, which he felt was the mark of the working class. However, Ruppert interviewed Huggins upon Johnson's recommendation, and agreed that Huggins knew much about baseball. Ruppert offered the job to Huggins, who initially did not want to take the position, as the Yankees were in no better a position than the Cardinals. J. G. Taylor Spink of The Sporting News eventually convinced Huggins to accept the offer, and he signed a two-year contract. The hiring of Huggins drove a wedge between the two co-owners that culminated in Huston selling his shares of the team to Ruppert in 1922.

"I call him the squarest shooter I ever knew in baseball."

— Lou Gehrig on Huggins

Having taken charge Huggins did not shy away from making personnel changes. Upon taking over the Yankees, he stressed fundamental baseball, drilling the Yankees in the art of the bunt. Huggins also made his first player transaction, acquiring Del Pratt and Eddie Plank from the St. Louis Browns trading Nick Cullop, Joe Gedeon, Fritz Maisel, Les Nunamaker, Urban Shocker and $15,000 ($321,000 in current dollar terms), a move that led to criticism in the press.

In Huggins' first season with the Yankees, the team finished fourth in the AL. After that season, he obtained Ernie Shore, Dutch Leonard and Duffy Lewis from the Boston Red Sox, for Ray Caldwell, Frank Gilhooley, Slim Love, and Roxy Walters. The following year he traded Pratt, Muddy Ruel, Hank Thormahlen and Sammy Vick to the Red Sox for Waite Hoyt, Harry Harper, Mike McNally and Wally Schang. Huggins signed a one-year contract to remain with the Yankees for a reported $12,000.

Huston continually took the side of his players in any argument they had against Huggins, criticizing Huggins in the press when the Yankees lost the pennant in 1920. Meanwhile, Ruppert was at best a lukewarm advocate of Huggins. Babe Ruth resisted Huggins' discipline; he did not respect Huggins due to his small stature, soft-spoken nature, and inability to fight, and Huggins was unable to enforce punishments on Ruth, despite being well educated. The Yankees finished third in the AL in 1919 and 1920. Huggins signed a one-year contract to remain with the team in 1921.

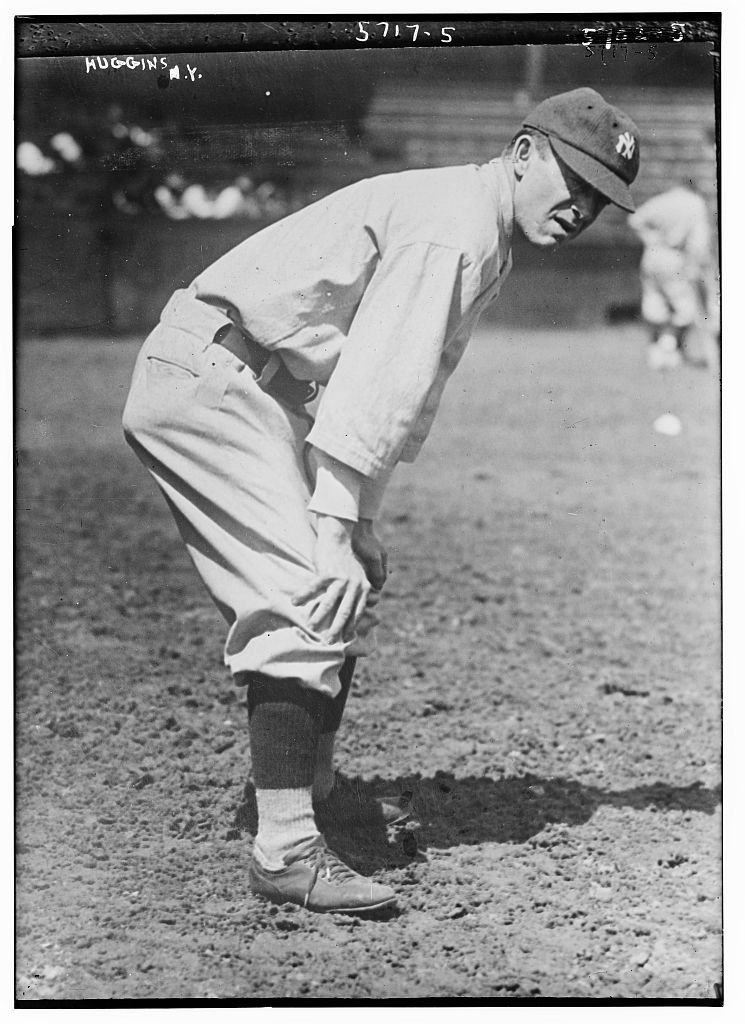
Huggins with the Yankees in 1922

Coming into the 1921 season, Huggins was still experiencing criticism in the press. Hugh Fullerton wrote that "in the past Huggins has not shone as a leader of men". By that season, Huggins developed Aaron Ward, Wally Pipp, and Bob Shawkey. The Yankees won their first AL pennant in 1921, reaching the World Series for the first time in franchise history, silencing his critics in the press. However, they lost the 1921 World Series to the New York Giants. In response, Huggins sought to add more pitching talent.

Before the 1922 season, Huggins acquired Johnny Mitchell from the Vernon Tigers of the Pacific Coast League and traded fan favorite Roger Peckinpaugh along with Rip Collins, Bill Piercy, and Jack Quinn to the Red Sox for Everett Scott, Bullet Joe Bush, and Sad Sam Jones. By this time, Ruppert hired Ed Barrow as the team's business manager, and he aided Huggins in player transactions. The Yankees repeated as AL champions that season, but lost the 1922 World Series, again to the Giants. With the newly gained confidence of his owners, Huggins was retained as manager.

The Yankees won their first World Series in 1923, preventing the Giants from repeating as champions for the third consecutive season. They were unable to retain their title the following season however, finishing second in the AL to the Washington Senators.

Huggins had come to regret his trade of Urban Shocker to the Browns. In St. Louis, the spitballer Shocker had come into his own as a starter, racking up four straight 20-win seasons (1920–23) and leading the American League with 27 wins in 1921 and strikeouts the following year, when he won 24 games. Shocker was reacquired for Bullet Joe Bush, Milt Gaston and Joe Giard in December 1924.

However, through 42 games of the 1925 season, the Yankees struggled, falling to seventh place in the eight-team AL, 13 1/2 games out of first place. Huggins made wholesale changes to the Yankees' lineup, as he replaced Ward at second base with Howard Shanks, catchers Steve O'Neill and Wally Schang with Benny Bengough, and, most notably, Pipp with Lou Gehrig at first base, beginning Gehrig's record consecutive games played streak. Among the team's regulars, only Babe Ruth, Joe Dugan, and Bob Meusel remained in the lineup. However, the team continued to struggle; amid rumors that he might replace Huggins, Ruppert stated that "Miller Huggins will be manager as long as he cares to be". The Yankees fell to seventh place in the AL that season.

With Ruppert's full support, Huggins' duties with the Yankees included keeping Ruth in line. Unafraid of his star player, Huggins and Ruth often clashed. Huggins suspended Ruth indefinitely on August 29, 1925, for "misconduct off the playing field", while also fining him $5,000 ($91,800 in current dollar terms), and as it was an away game in St. Louis, Ruth was ordered to pay his own way back to New York. The actual reason was because he arrived late for batting practice after yet another night out the night before, though it was a culmination of his pranks and insistence of recruiting less able teammates to go clubbing with him, causing them to nurse hangovers. Ruth responded by claiming Ruppert would rescind the fine and suspension, and that he would never play for Huggins again, believing that Ruppert would side with him over Huggins. However, Ruppert insisted that the fine would stand and that Ruth would be suspended for as long as Huggins desired. After apologizing to Huggins and Ruppert, Ruth was reinstated on September 5. Ruth did not challenge Huggins' authority again.

"He was the only man who knew how to keep me in line."

— Babe Ruth on Huggins

Huggins restructured the team for the 1926 season, giving starting jobs to Mark Koenig and Tony Lazzeri. That season, Huggins won his fourth pennant with the Yankees in 1926, marking the first time that a team won a pennant after finishing seventh the year prior. However, the Yankees lost the 1926 World Series to the Cardinals in seven games.

Winning the pennant once again in the 1927 season, Huggins matched Cap Anson's mark of five pennants in seven seasons. That year, the Yankees benefited from the development of George Pipgras and Wilcy Moore, and set an American League record with 110 regular season victories, winning the AL by 19 games. The Yankees swept the Pittsburgh Pirates in the 1927 World Series. This team became known as Murderers' Row, and is considered one of the greatest teams in baseball history.

Huggins remained confident in his team's ability to repeat as AL champions in 1928 season. Huggins supplemented his team by acquiring Bill Dickey from the minor leagues. He acquired Stan Coveleski, who was attempting to return to his peak years, but released him in August when the former star continued to struggle. The Yankees reached the 1928 World Series, winning their sixth pennant in eight years, and defeated the Cardinals 4 games to 0. This was the first time a team swept their opponents in consecutive World Series'.

Huggins continued to tinker with his roster during the offseason. He traded Dugan, Mike Gazella, Rosy Ryan and Pat Collins, and acquired Lyn Lary from the Pacific Coast League. He tried Lary at third base and Leo Durocher at shortstop, while he attempted to acquire George Uhle and Ed Morris, but was unsuccessful in both cases. The Yankees fell behind the Philadelphia Athletics in the standings during the 1929 season and as it became clear that the Yankees would not win the AL pennant in 1929, Huggins began consulting with coaches Art Fletcher and Bob Shawkey about the future of the team, including how to replace Bob Meusel in left field. However, by August 1929, Huggins began losing weight and complained of feeling ill.

== Death ==
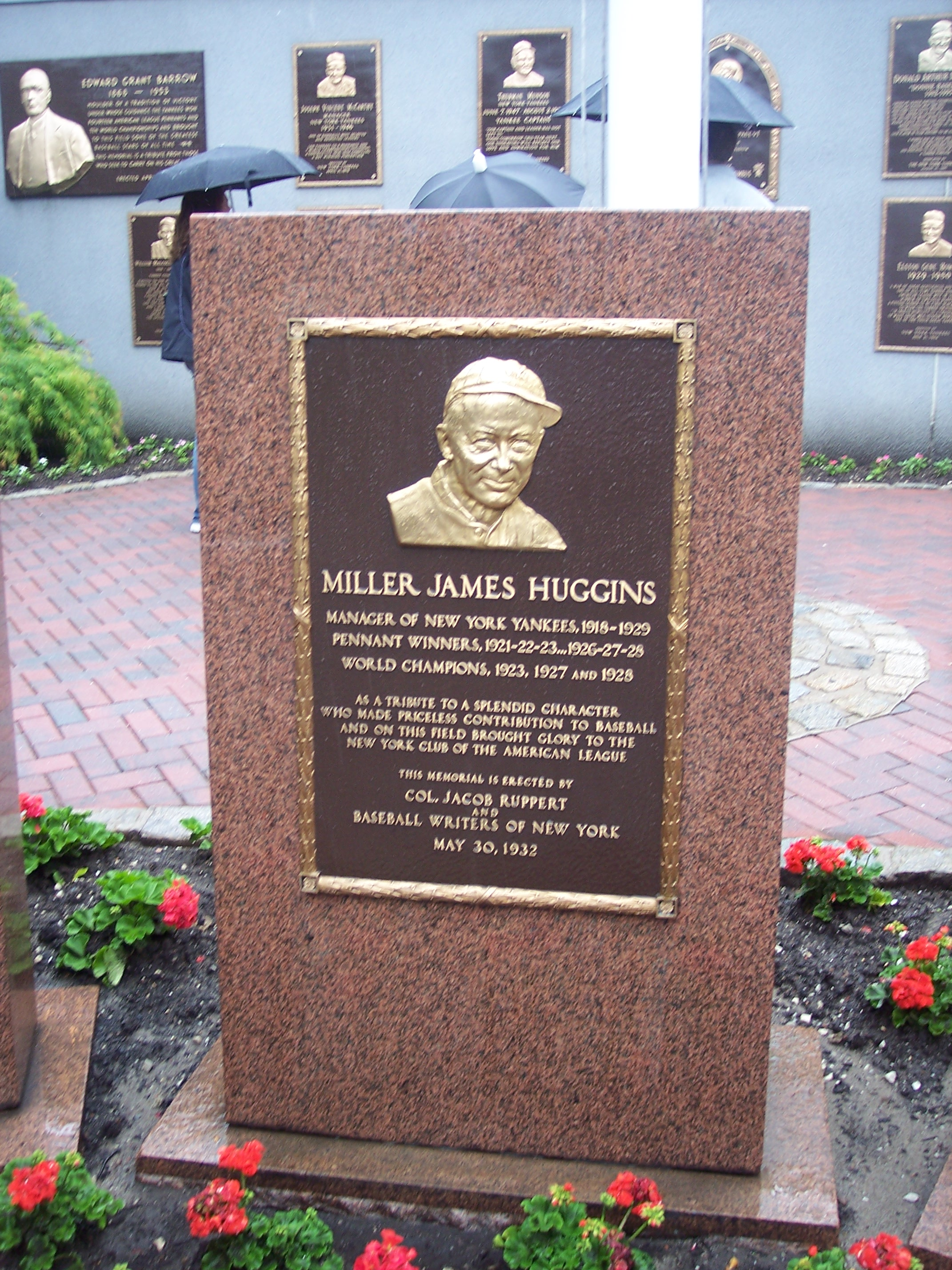
The monument dedicated to Huggins by the New York Yankees in Monument Park

Huggins fell ill on September 20, 1929, and checked into Saint Vincent's Catholic Medical Center for erysipelas. His condition was complicated by the development of influenza with high fever. The Yankees' club physician, in consultation with other doctors, decided to administer blood transfusions. But despite their best efforts, Huggins died at the age of 51 on September 25, 1929, of pyaemia. The American League canceled its games for September 27, the day of his funeral, and his viewing at Yankee Stadium drew thousands of tearful fans. A moment of silence was held for Huggins before the start of Game 4 of the 1929 World Series (at Philadelphia's Shibe Park, after which the A's overcame an 8–0 Cubs advantage with 10 runs in the last of the seventh for a spectacular 10–8 come-from-behind victory and a 3–1 Series advantage). He was interred in Spring Grove Cemetery in his native Cincinnati.

The Yankees found it difficult to replace Huggins. Art Fletcher managed the team for its final 11 games of the 1929 season, but he did not want to manage the team full-time. After the season, Ruppert offered the job in turn to Fletcher, Donie Bush and Eddie Collins, all of whom declined. Eventually, "Bob the Gob" Shawkey agreed to serve as the Yankees manager for the 1930 season, leading the team to a third-place finish.

== Playing and managing profile ==
Huggins was listed at 5 feet 5 inches (1.65 m) and 140 pounds (64 kg). His small stature inspired the nicknames "Mighty Mite" and the "Mite Manager". He was also known as "Rabbit" and "Little Everywhere" for his ability to cover ground in the infield. An excellent leadoff batter and defensive second baseman, he ended his playing career with a .265 batting average and .956 fielding percentage. He led the league in walks four times and regularly posted an on-base percentage near .400. He scored 100 or more runs three times and regularly stole 30 or more bases for 324 lifetime steals. On the downside, in 1914 he set the single season caught-stealing record in the National League, when he was thrown out 36 times (as opposed to 32 successful steals).

Huggins finished his managerial career with a 1413–1134 record. His 1413 wins as a manager ranks 23rd all-time (as of the start of the 2012 season). He learned his managerial strategy by observing Hanlon and Bresnahan. His managerial style at first emphasized speed, base-stealing, hit- and-run plays and "slap" (i.e., contact) hitting, but the acquisition of superstar slugger Ruth dictated a change of emphasis towards power and not giving away outs. For the slugging Yankees of the 1920s, he recruited power hitters and consistent (as opposed to brilliant) pitchers.

=== Managerial record ===
Team	Year	Regular season					Postseason			
Team	Year	Games	Won	Lost	Win %	Finish	Won	Lost	Win %	Result
STL	1913	150	51	99	.340	8th in NL	–	–	–	–
STL	1914	153	81	72	.529	3rd in NL	–	–	–	–
STL	1915	153	71	82	.464	6th in NL	–	–	–	–
STL	1916	153	60	93	.392	7th in NL	–	–	–	–
STL	1917	152	82	70	.539	3rd in NL	–	–	–	–
STL total		761	346	415	.455		0	0	–	
NYY	1918	123	60	63	.488	4th in AL	–	–	–	–
NYY	1919	139	80	59	.576	3rd in AL	–	–	–	–
NYY	1920	154	95	59	.617	3rd in AL	–	–	–	–
NYY	1921	153	98	55	.641	1st in AL	3	5	.375	Lost World Series (NYG)
NYY	1922	154	94	60	.610	1st in AL	0	4	.000	Lost World Series (NYG)
NYY	1923	152	98	54	.645	1st in AL	4	2	.667	Won World Series (NYG)
NYY	1924	152	89	63	.586	2nd in AL	–	–	–	–
NYY	1925	154	69	85	.448	7th in AL	–	–	–	–
NYY	1926	154	91	63	.591	1st in AL	3	4	.429	Lost World Series (STL)
NYY	1927	154	110	44	.714	1st in AL	4	0	1.000	Won World Series (PIT)
NYY	1928	154	101	53	.656	1st in AL	4	0	1.000	Won World Series (STL)
NYY	1929	143	82	61	.573	illness	–	–	–	–
NYY total		1786	1067	719	.597		18	15	.545	
Total		2543	1413	1134	.555		18	15	.545	

== Legacy ==
In 1915, umpire and sportswriter Billy Evans, writing about the scarcity of competent second basemen in baseball, listed Huggins, Collins, Pratt, Johnny Evers, and Nap Lajoie as the best in the game. He later wrote that Huggins was "one of the greatest managers I have ever met". Bill James ranked Huggins as the 37th best second baseman of all time in 2001 in his The New Bill James Historical Baseball Abstract.

The Yankees dedicated a monument to Huggins on May 30, 1932, placing it in front of the flagpole in center field at Yankee Stadium. Huggins was the first Yankees legend granted this honor. Later, posthumous monuments were added there for Lou Gehrig in 1941, and Babe Ruth in 1949. These always remained within the field of play, so long as Yankees Stadium maintained its original commodious outfield dimensions (that reached 461 feet in right center).

Many years later, with the outfield shrunk to barely over 400 feet in a sweeping stadium remodel, the memorials were relocated to a "Monument Park" created behind the centerfield fence, and dedicated in 1976. Since that time, additional monuments have been placed for Mickey Mantle (1996), Joe DiMaggio (1999), and George Steinbrenner (2010), again all posthumous.

The plaque on Huggins’ monument describes him as "A splendid character who made priceless contributions to baseball." The Yankees also named a field at Al Lang Stadium, their spring training home in Florida, after Huggins.

Huggins was included on the ballot for the National Baseball Hall of Fame in 1937, 1938, 1939, 1942, 1945, 1946, 1948, and 1950, (Note: No elections for the Hall of Fame were held in 1940, 1941, 1943, or 1944.) failing to receive the number of votes required for election on those occasions. Named in the Honor Rolls of Baseball in 1946, the Veterans Committee elected Huggins to the Hall of Fame in February 1964, and he was posthumously inducted that summer.

== Personal life ==
Huggins was a private man who kept to himself. He lived in Cincinnati during the winters while playing for the Reds and Cardinals, but began to make St. Petersburg, Florida, his winter home while managing the Yankees. Huggins did not marry, and lived with his sister while in Cincinnati.

Huggins invested in real estate holdings in Florida, although he sold them in 1926 (three years before the stock market crash, fortunately for him) as they took too much of his time away from baseball. He enjoyed playing golf and billiards in his spare time.

He was portrayed by Ernie Adams in The Pride of the Yankees, Fred Lightner in The Babe Ruth Story, Bruce Weitz in Babe Ruth, and Joe Ragno in The Babe.

== See also ==
- List of Major League Baseball career stolen bases leaders
- List of Major League Baseball managers with most career wins
- List of Major League Baseball player-managers
