= Frank Callaway (baseball) =

American baseball player (1898-1987)

Frank Burnett Callaway (February 26, 1898 – September 17, 1987) was an American professional baseball infielder. Callaway was born in Knoxville in 1898. He attended the University of Tennessee prior to playing professionally with the Philadelphia Athletics of Major League Baseball during the 1921 and 1922 seasons. He is buried at Highland Memorial Cemetery in Knoxville, Tennessee.
