= Ben Shields =

American baseball player (1903–1982)

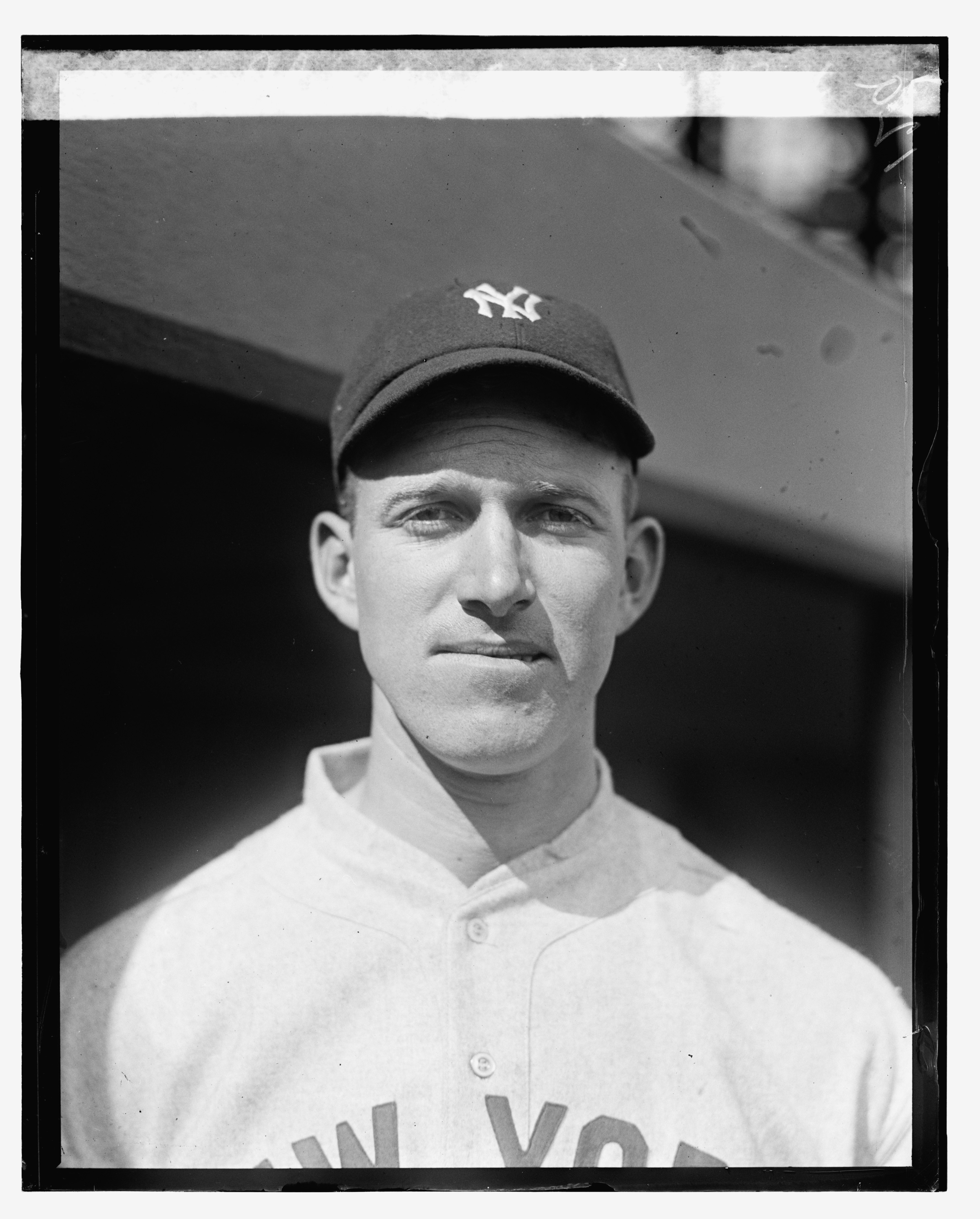
- Pitcher
- Born: June 17, 1903; Huntersville, North Carolina, U.S.
- Died: January 24, 1982 (aged 78); Woodruff, South Carolina, U.S.
- Batted: Right Threw: Left

MLB debut
- April 17, 1924, for the New York Yankees

Last MLB appearance
- May 23, 1931, for the Philadelphia Phillies

MLB statistics
- Win–loss record: 4–0
- Earned run average: 8.27
- Strikeouts: 9
- Stats at Baseball Reference

Teams
- New York Yankees (1924–1925); Boston Red Sox (1930); Philadelphia Phillies (1931)

Benjamin Cowan Shields [Lefty or Big Ben] (June 17, 1903 – January 24, 1982) was an American middle relief pitcher in Major League Baseball who played from 1924 through 1931 for the New York Yankees (1924–1925), Boston Red Sox (1930) and Philadelphia Phillies (1931). Listed at 6 ft 5.5 in (1.97 m), 195 lb., Shields batted right-handed and threw left-handed. He was born in Huntersville, North Carolina.

In a four-season career, Shields posted 4–0 record with an 8.27 earned run average (ERA) in 13 appearances, including two starts, two complete game, nine strikeouts in 41 1/3 innings pitched. He never lost a game despite his high ERA of 8.27; he benefited from pitching for a powerful Yankees team that featured Babe Ruth and Lou Gehrig among others. He recorded three of his wins towards the end of the 1925 season, winning games by scores of 6–5, 7–6, and 9–8 respectively. He would record an additional win by pitching four scoreless innings in a 1931 game for the Philadelphia Phillies. However, he had entered that game having given up seven earned runs in two-thirds of an inning which calculated to an ERA of 94.50. It lowered to 13.50 after the outing that resulted in his fourth win, but only appeared in one major league contest after that.

Shields died on January 24, 1982 at the age of 78 in Woodruff, South Carolina.
