= Jim Sullivan (1920s pitcher) =

American baseball player (1894–1972)

- Pitcher
- Born: April 5, 1894; Mine Run, Virginia
- Died: February 12, 1972 (aged 77); Burtonsville, Maryland
- Batted: Right Threw: Right

MLB debut
- September 27, 1921, for the Philadelphia Athletics

Last MLB appearance
- September 28, 1923, for the Cleveland Indians

MLB statistics
- Win–loss record: 0-5
- Earned run average: 5.52
- Strikeouts: 27
- Stats at Baseball Reference

Teams
- Philadelphia Athletics (1921–1922); Cleveland Indians (1923)

James Richard Sullivan (April 5, 1894 – February 12, 1972) was a Major League Baseball pitcher who played for three seasons. He played for the Philadelphia Athletics from 1921 to 1922 and the Cleveland Indians in 1923. He made his major league debut for the Athletics on September 27, 1921.
