= Harvey Hendrick =

American baseball player (1897–1941)

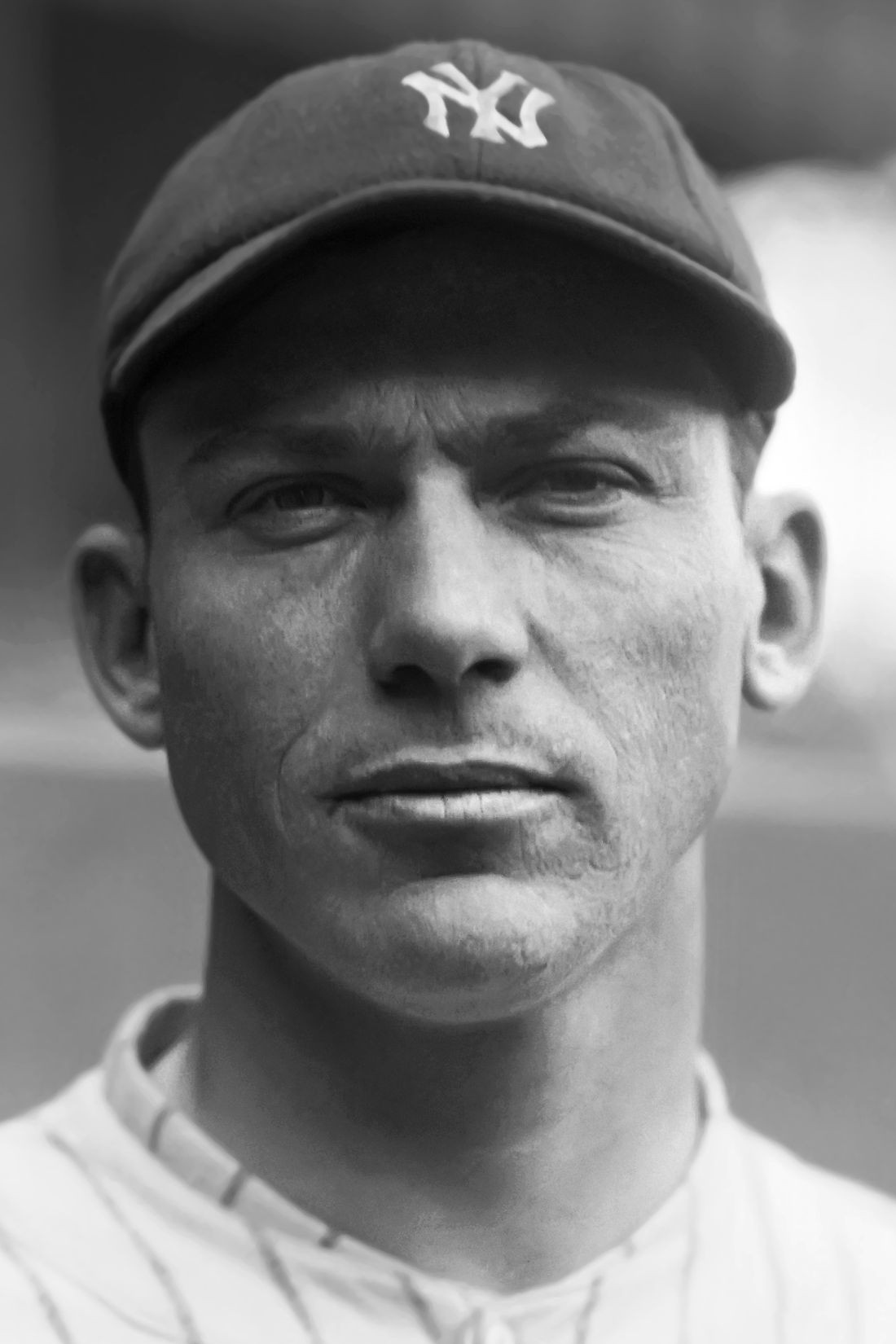
- First baseman
- Born: November 9, 1897; Mason, Tennessee, U.S.
- Died: October 29, 1941 (aged 43); Covington, Tennessee, U.S.
- Batted: Left Threw: Right

MLB debut
- April 20, 1923, for the New York Yankees

Last MLB appearance
- August 28, 1934, for the Philadelphia Phillies

MLB statistics
- Batting average: .308
- Home runs: 48
- Runs batted in: 413
- Stats at Baseball Reference

Teams
- New York Yankees (1923–1924); Cleveland Indians (1925); Brooklyn Robins (1927–1931); Cincinnati Reds (1931–1932); St. Louis Cardinals (1932); Chicago Cubs (1933); Philadelphia Phillies (1934)

Career highlights and awards
- World Series champion (1923)

Harvey "Gink" Hendrick (November 9, 1897 – October 29, 1941) was an American Major League Baseball player who played for several different teams during an eleven-year career.

== Early years ==
Born near Mason, Tennessee on November 9, 1897 to Richard T. and Nannie Harvey Hendrick, Hendrick went to elementary school in Brownsville, Tennessee. Hendrick attended preparatory school at Fitzgerald & Clarke School in Tullahoma, Tennessee; also attended by the likes of Vanderbilt football greats Lynn Bomar and Hek Wakefield. He then attended Vanderbilt University, playing football and baseball for the Commodores. He was a favored target of Jess Neely on the football team.

== Professional baseball ==
He signed with the Memphis Chicks after graduating from Vanderbilt, but was released from the team before playing a game. He began his professional career with the Chattanooga Lookouts in 1921, and had a .274 batting average in 141 games. He followed that up the following year with a .311 batting average in 134 games for the Galveston Sand Crabs. During the offseason, shortly after being signed by the Boston Red Sox, Hendrick was traded to the New York Yankees with George Pipgras for Al DeVormer. He made his major league debut with the Yankees in 1923, where he had a .273 batting average in 37 games and had one at-bat in the 1923 World Series.

After one more year with New York where he played in 40 games, he joined the Cleveland Indians and played in 25 games for them. Hendrick spent 1926 in the minor leagues with the Newark Bears, then joined the Brooklyn Robins, arriving days before everyone else for spring training, as the team planned to use him as a utility player. In 1927, he had a .310 average and 29 stolen bases in 128 games, then followed that up a .318 average in 1928, a .354 average in 1929 which was ninth in the National League along with 14 home runs and 82 runs batted in, and a .257 average in 1930. After playing in one game for the Robins in 1931, he was traded to the Cincinnati Reds for Mickey Heath.

In 137 games for the Reds, he had a .314 batting average. Hendrick split 1932 with the Reds and St. Louis Cardinals when he was traded, along with Benny Frey, for Chick Hafey during the season. He then finished his career with the Chicago Cubs in 1933 and the Philadelphia Phillies in 1934.

== Career statistics ==
In an 11-year major league career, Hendrick batted .308 (896-2910) with 434 runs scored, 48 home runs and 413 RBIs in 922 games played. His on-base percentage was .364 and slugging percentage was .443. He surpassed the .300 mark four times.

== Death ==
Hendrick died by his own hand, shooting himself in his Covington, Tennessee home, on October 29, 1941. He was 43.

== See also ==
- List of Vanderbilt University people
- 1920 Vanderbilt Commodores football team
- 1920 College Football All-Southern Team
