= Bill Bishop (1920s pitcher) =

American baseball player (1900-1956)

- Pitcher
- Born: October 22, 1900; Houtzdale, Pennsylvania, U.S.
- Died: February 14, 1956 (aged 55); St. Joseph, Missouri, U.S.
- Batted: Left Threw: Left

MLB debut
- September 15, 1921, for the Philadelphia Athletics

Last MLB appearance
- September 24, 1921, for the Philadelphia Athletics

MLB statistics
- Win–loss record: 0–0
- Earned run average: 0.00
- Strikeouts: 4
- Stats at Baseball Reference

Teams
- Philadelphia Athletics (1921)

William Henry Bishop (October 22, 1900 – February 14, 1956) was an American Major League Baseball (MLB) pitcher. He played for the Philadelphia Athletics during the 1921 season.
