= Wally Pipp =

American baseball player (1893–1965)

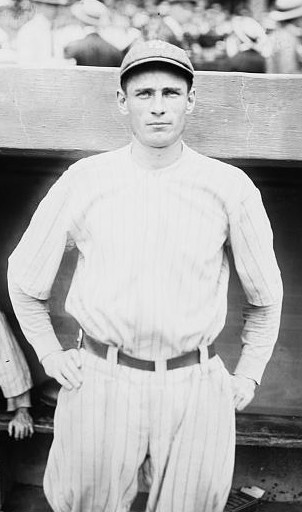
- Pipp with the New York Yankees in 1922
- First baseman
- Born: February 17, 1893; Chicago, Illinois, U.S.
- Died: January 11, 1965 (aged 71); Grand Rapids, Michigan, U.S.
- Batted: Left Threw: Left

MLB debut
- June 29, 1913, for the Detroit Tigers

Last MLB appearance
- September 30, 1928, for the Cincinnati Reds

MLB statistics
- Batting average: .281
- Home runs: 90
- Runs batted in: 1,004
- Stats at Baseball Reference

Teams
- Detroit Tigers (1913); New York Yankees (1915–1925); Cincinnati Reds (1926–1928)

Career highlights and awards
- World Series champion (1923); 2× AL home run leader (1916, 1917)

Walter Clement Pipp Sr. (February 17, 1893 – January 11, 1965) was an American professional baseball player. A first baseman, Pipp played in Major League Baseball (MLB) for the Detroit Tigers, New York Yankees, and Cincinnati Reds between 1913 and 1928.

After appearing in 12 games for the Tigers in 1913 and playing in the minor leagues in 1914, he was purchased by the Yankees before the 1915 season. They made him their starting first baseman. He and Home Run Baker led an improved Yankee lineup that led the league in home runs. He led the American League in home runs in 1916 and 1917. With Babe Ruth, Bob Meusel, Joe Dugan, and Waite Hoyt, the Yankees won three consecutive American League pennants from 1921 through 1923, and won the 1923 World Series. In 1925, he lost his starting role to Lou Gehrig, after which he finished his major league career with Cincinnati.

Although he is considered to be one of the best power hitters of the dead ball era, Pipp is now best remembered as the man who lost his starting role as the Yankees' first baseman to Gehrig on June 2, 1925, after experiencing a headache. This began Gehrig's streak of 2,130 consecutive games played, which stood as an MLB record for 56 years.

== Early life ==
Walter Pipp was born on February 17, 1893, in Chicago, Illinois. His mother Pauline (née Stroeber) came to the US from Germany at a young age with her parents. His father, William H. Pipp, was the son of immigrants from Germany that married in Michigan. He was raised as a Roman Catholic in Grand Rapids, Michigan. As a child, Pipp said that he was hit in the head with a hockey puck, which resulted in headaches throughout his life.

Pipp enrolled at the Catholic University of America in Washington, D.C., where he studied architecture and played baseball for the Catholic University Cardinals. Pipp graduated in 1913.

== Baseball career ==
=== Early career ===
In 1912, Pipp made his debut in professional baseball with the Kalamazoo Celery Pickers of the Class D level Southern Michigan League. In 68 games played, he had a .270 batting average. The Detroit Tigers of the American League purchased his contract late in the 1912 season. Pipp attempted to hold out from the Tigers, demanding a portion of the purchase price, and threatened to return to college.

After graduating from college, Pipp ended his holdout without receiving a share of the purchase price. Pipp made his major league debut with the Tigers on June 29, 1913. After playing 12 games for Detroit, batting .161, the Tigers reassigned Pipp to the Providence Grays of the Class AA International League. He committed seven errors in 14 games for Providence, and was demoted to the Scranton Miners of the Class B New York State League, where he only batted .220.

In 1914, Pipp played for the Rochester Hustlers of the International League. Pipp had a .314 batting average and 27 triples. He led all batters in the league with 15 home runs, a .526 slugging percentage, and 290 total bases.

=== New York Yankees ===
In January 1915, Jacob Ruppert and Tillinghast L'Hommedieu Huston agreed to purchase the New York Yankees of the American League. As part of the agreement, the other team owners in the American League agreed to help the Yankees restock their system with prospects. One of the deals Ruppert and Huston negotiated was their purchase of Pipp. After Ruppert and Huston completed the purchase of the team, the other American League owners, with the exception of Frank Navin, the owner of the Tigers, broke their word. On February 4, 1915, the Tigers sold Pipp and outfielder Hugh High to the Yankees, receiving $5,000 for each player ($112,000 in 2024 dollars).

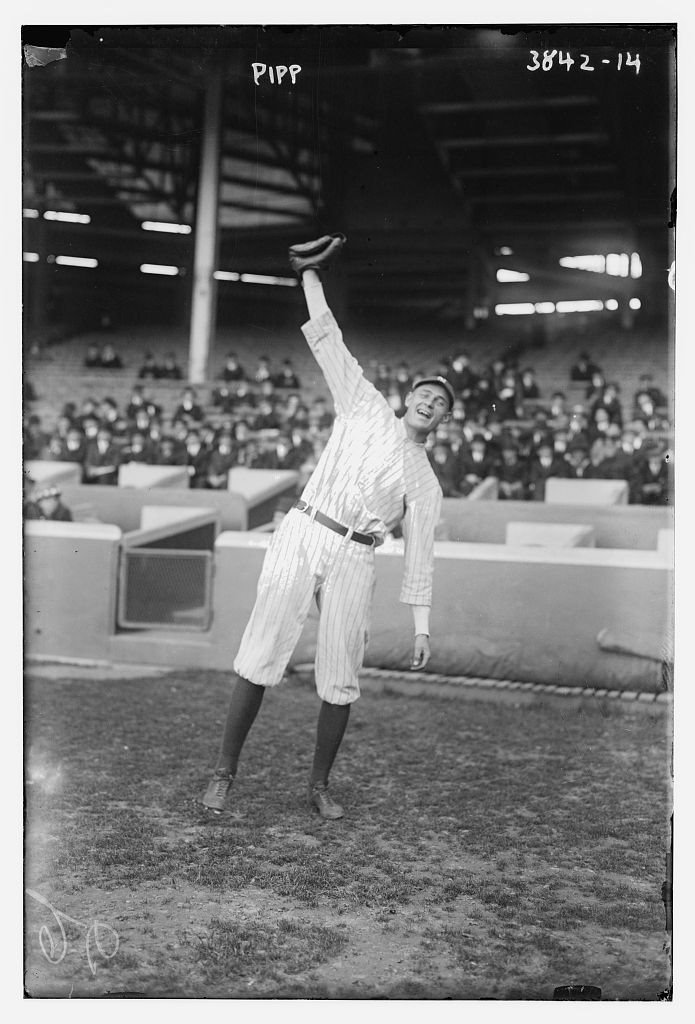
Pipp with the Yankees in 1916

The Yankees had struggled prior to Ruppert and Huston's purchase, having only one winning record in their previous eight seasons. They made Pipp their starting first baseman in time for Opening Day of the 1915 season. The Yankees added Home Run Baker in 1916, and they formed the center of the Yankees' batting order. Pipp led the American League in home runs with 12 in 1916; Baker finished second with 10. Pipp hit nine home runs in 1917, again leading the league.

In 1918, Pipp hit only two home runs, but batted .304. He missed playing time under the nation's "work or fight" rule during World War I; he worked as a naval aviation cadet at the Massachusetts Institute of Technology. He batted .275 with seven home runs in 1919, as Babe Ruth surpassed him as the best power hitter in the American League. The Yankees moved to strengthen their team after the 1919 season, adding Ruth and fellow outfielder Bob Meusel and third baseman Joe Dugan. Between 1920 and 1924, Pipp had a .301 average, with season averages of 29 doubles, 94 runs scored, and 97 runs batted in (RBI) per season. Led by their strong lineup and additions to the pitching staff, such as Waite Hoyt, the Yankees finished in second place in 1920. Pipp became the cleanup hitter, behind Ruth in the batting order. Pipp hit .296 in 1921, and the Yankees won the American League pennant. However, they lost the 1921 World Series to the crosstown rival New York Giants of the National League.

On July 26, 1922, Pipp bobbled a ball during the fifth inning of a game against the St. Louis Browns. When the Yankees returned to the dugout, Ruth criticized Pipp's fielding. Pipp attacked Ruth, and the two were separated by teammates. Though Ruth insisted they'd "settle this after the game", Ruth and Pipp led the Yankees to a victory with their hitting, and when Pipp approached Ruth after the game, ready to fight, Ruth opted against it. Pipp said this resulted in reduced tension among the Yankees, to which he attributed their improved play from that point forward. Pipp batted .329 in 1922 and the Yankees again won the American League pennant. In a rematch, the Giants again defeated the Yankees in the 1922 World Series. Meanwhile, Pipp scouted Lou Gehrig, who was playing college baseball for Columbia University, and suggested to Miller Huggins, the Yankees' manager, that he should sign Gehrig. Pipp personally helped develop Gehrig after he signed. Pipp had a strong 1923 season, but injured his right ankle while stepping down from a train in Boston late in the year. The Yankees used Gehrig, whom they promoted from the minor leagues, to play in four games at first base replacing Pipp, before calling upon Babe Ruth to substitute at first base for the four games at the very end of the season. Though Huggins initially thought Pipp would not be able to play in the 1923 World Series, Pipp recovered sufficiently in time to play. The Yankees won the series in six games over the Giants. The Yankees finished in second place in the American League in 1924, and Pipp led the league with 114 RBIs and 19 triples.

==== 1925: Removal from the Yankees' starting lineup ====
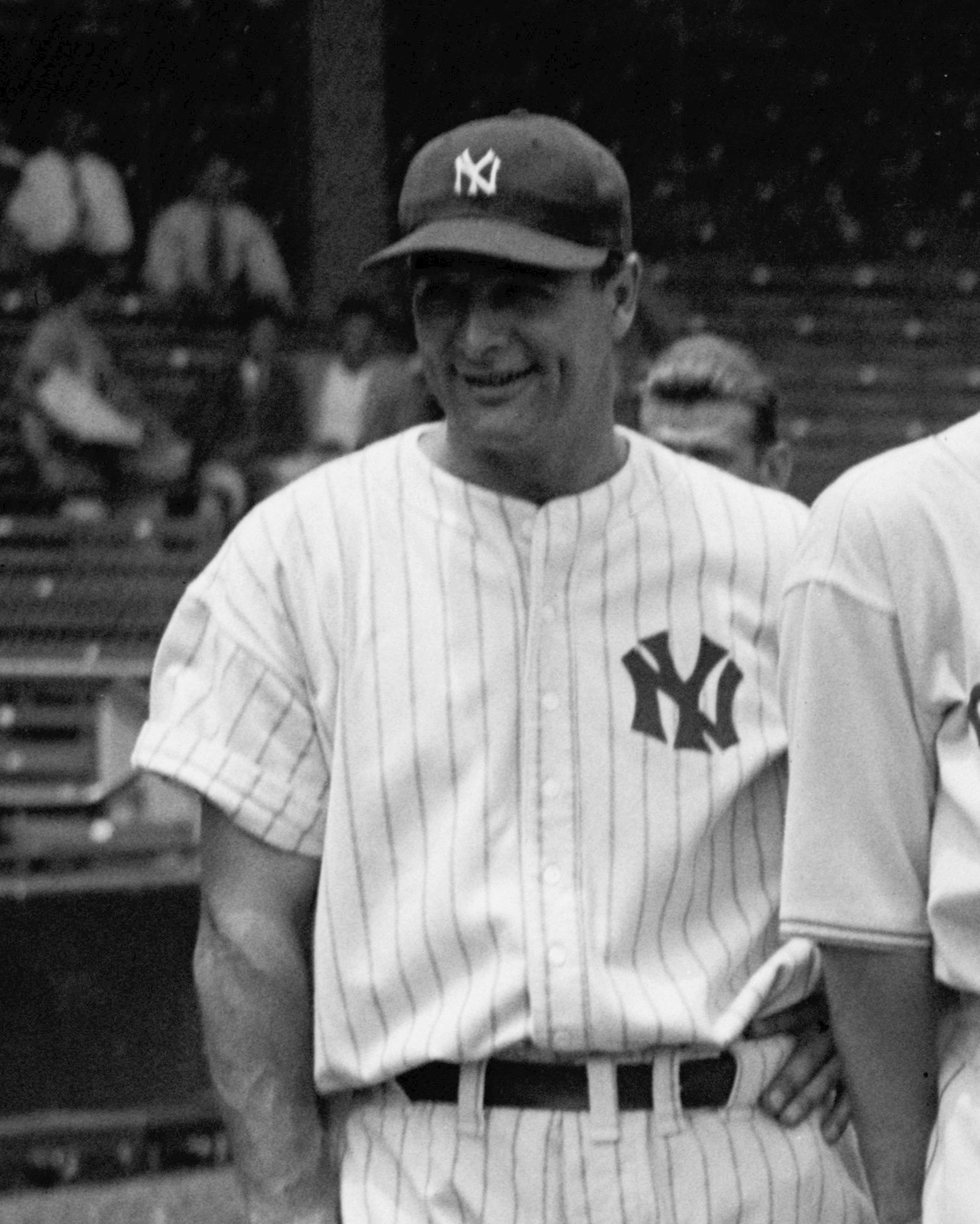
Lou Gehrig replaced Pipp in the Yankees' lineup on June 2, 1925.

The Yankees began the 1925 season struggling, and Huggins began to replace players in his lineup in response. Huggins benched starting shortstop Everett Scott on May 6, replacing him with Pee Wee Wanninger. At the time, Scott had the longest streak of consecutive games played, with 1,307. The Yankees continued to struggle. The Yankees entered play on June 2 on a five-game losing streak. Their 15–26 win–loss record had them in seventh place out of the eight teams in the American League, half a game better than the last place team, and 13 1/2 games out of first place in the standings. Before their game against the Washington Senators, Huggins replaced Pipp in the Yankees' lineup with Gehrig, and benched second baseman Aaron Ward and catcher Wally Schang as well. Pipp was batting .244 with only three home runs and 23 RBIs, and had a .181 batting average over the previous three weeks. This was the second—not the first—game of Gehrig's then-record 2,130 consecutive games played, which lasted for 14 seasons. The streak started the previous day, as on June 1 Gehrig entered the game as a pinch hitter, substituting for shortstop Wanninger.

Although Pipp's replacement on June 2, 1925, was historic, and Gehrig had a great game by getting three hits, Gehrig would in fact go 0 for 3 in each of his next two games, before being lifted for a pinch-hitter each day. Pipp would finish both of those games defensively at first base.

According to the most popular version of the story, Pipp showed up at Yankee Stadium that day with a severe headache, and asked the team's trainer for two aspirin. Miller Huggins, the Yankees' manager, noticed this, and said "Wally, take the day off. We'll try that kid Gehrig at first today and get you back in there tomorrow." Gehrig played well and became the Yankees' new starting first baseman. This story first appeared in a 1939 New York World-Telegram on Gehrig's career, in which Pipp was interviewed. Pipp was later quoted to have said, "I took the two most expensive aspirin in history."

According to The Pride of the Yankees, the 1942 film about Gehrig's life, Pipp asked out of the game because he was experiencing double vision from being hit in the head two days prior. By 1953, Pipp reported to The New York Times that he was taken out of the lineup due to being hit in the head by a pitch thrown by Charlie Caldwell during batting practice. However, while Pipp was hit in the head by a pitch from Caldwell and was hospitalized, this event occurred on July 2, a month after Pipp's benching.

The New York Sun reported the benching was due to Pipp's struggles against left-handed pitchers, as southpaw George Mogridge was the scheduled starting pitcher for the Senators on June 2. Other sources suggest Yankee manager Miller Huggins may have actually benched Pipp and other veterans in order to "shake up" the slumping lineup. According to another story, supported by Gehrig's wife, Pipp was not at the game on June 2 because he was gambling on horse racing at a race track. His son Thomas denied this rumor, stating that his father never bet on horses. When interviewed by Sports Illustrated, Pipp's own children disagreed on the reason for their father's benching, believing it was either due to Pipp being beaned or struggling. Thomas believed Pipp told Huggins to play Gehrig in his place, as he knew Gehrig had a future with the Yankees, while he likely did not. According to a popular legend, Pipp asked to sit due to a headache. The story was confirmed by Thomas and by Bill Werber.

=== Later career ===
Ruth had returned to the Yankees' lineup on June 1, the day before Pipp, Ward, and Schang were benched. Despite Ruth's return and the strong play of Gehrig, who batted .295 with 20 home runs and 68 RBIs, the Yankees finished in seventh place. Pipp was hospitalized for a week after being hit in the head by Caldwell on July 2, and he played sparingly during the remainder of the season. He ended the year with a .230 average, three home runs, and 24 RBIs.

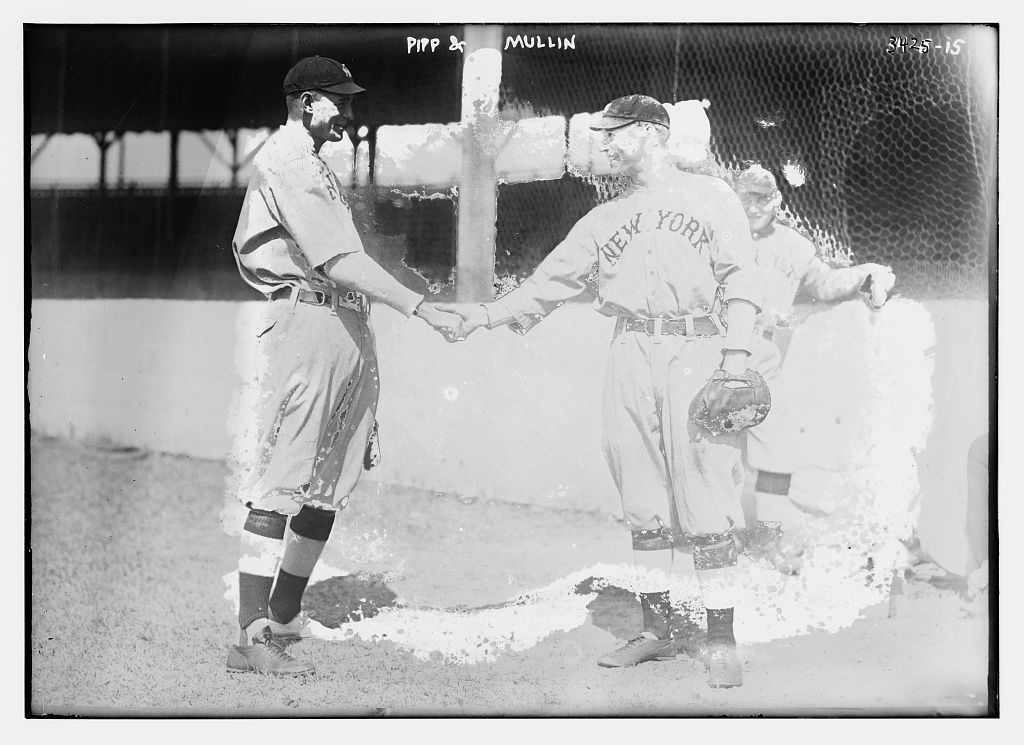
Pipp (left) and Charlie Mullen (right)

Due to the team's struggles, Huggins made personnel changes during the offseason. The Yankees attempted to trade Pipp to another American League team, but could not agree on the terms with any team. They put Pipp on waivers, and he was acquired by the Cincinnati Reds of the National League, who reportedly paid the Yankees a greater sum than the $7,500 waiver price. The Reds, who had not had a strong starting first baseman since Jake Daubert died in 1924, had attempted to acquire Bill Terry from the Giants, but refused to part with Edd Roush in the transaction, and so acquired Pipp instead. Pipp again attempted to acquire a portion of the purchase price, but was rebuffed.

Pipp played 372 games for the Reds over the next three seasons. In 1926, he had a .291 batting average, and his 99 RBIs and 15 triples were both fourth-best in the National League. He batted .260 with 41 RBIs in 1927, and .283 in 1928.

With first baseman George Kelly also on their roster, the Reds released Pipp before the 1929 season. Pipp signed with the Newark Bears of the International League for the season. He earned $40,000 ($570,000 in 2024 dollars) that year, more than he made during his major league career. He batted .312 for Newark, and retired after the season.

Pipp played 1,872 games. He had three seasons with a .300+ batting average, and two seasons with 100 or more RBI. Pipp had a .281 career batting average. He led both the American and National Leagues in fielding percentage. His 226 sacrifices as a Yankee remain a team record. Pipp was the first Yankee to lead the American League in home runs. Due to his famous replacement by Gehrig, players began to say they were "Wally Pipped" when replaced in a lineup, especially if it is due to a minor injury.

== Later life ==
Pipp often attended Old-Timers' Day at Yankee Stadium and Tiger Stadium, playing in 12 Old-Timers' games. He was later hired by Sports Illustrated as one of the magazine's first writers.

After retiring, Pipp invested in publicly listed shares, but lost his wealth in the Wall Street Crash of 1929. He authored a book, titled Buying Cheap and Selling Dear. He worked as a broadcaster on a pregame baseball show for the Tigers, wrote radio scripts, and worked in publishing. He organized baseball programs around his community for the National Youth Administration. He also spent time unemployed during the Great Depression. In 1940, Pipp was on the verge of bankruptcy, but he managed to pay off his debts without going bankrupt.

During World War II, Pipp worked at the Willow Run manufacturing complex in Ypsilanti, building B-24 bombers. Following the war, Pipp worked for the Rockford Screw Products Corporation as a machine parts salesman, selling bolts and screws to automotive companies based in Detroit and Grand Rapids.

== Personal life ==
Pipp and his wife, Nora, had four children: three sons (Walter, Tom, and Wally Jr.) and a daughter (Dorothy). Pipp's brother, the Reverend W.B. Pipp, was a Catholic priest and golfer.

The Pipps moved to Lansing, Michigan, in 1949. After suffering a number of strokes, Pipp moved to a nursing home in Grand Rapids in September 1963. He died there on January 11, 1965, of a heart attack at the age of 71. He is interred in Woodlawn Cemetery in Grand Rapids.

== See also ==
- List of Major League Baseball career triples leaders
- List of Major League Baseball annual home run leaders
- List of Major League Baseball annual triples leaders
- List of Major League Baseball career runs batted in leaders
