= Lefty Wolf =

American baseball player (1900-1971)

- Pitcher
- Born: June 10, 1900; Hartford, Connecticut, U.S.
- Died: September 25, 1971 (aged 71); New Orleans, Louisiana, U.S.
- Batted: Right Threw: Left

MLB debut
- July 4, 1921, for the Philadelphia Athletics

Last MLB appearance
- September 24, 1921, for the Philadelphia Athletics

MLB statistics
- Win–loss record: 0–0
- Earned run average: 7.20
- Strikeouts: 11
- Stats at Baseball Reference

Teams
- Philadelphia Athletics (1921)

Walter Francis "Lefty" Wolf (June 10, 1900 – September 25, 1971) was an American professional baseball pitcher. He appeared in eight games in Major League Baseball in 1921 with the Philadelphia Athletics.
