= Joe Dugan =

American baseball player (1897–1982)

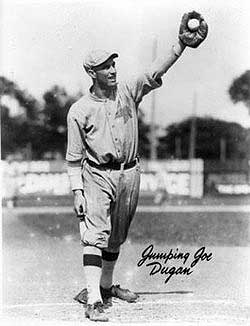
- Third baseman
- Born: May 12, 1897; Mahanoy City, Pennsylvania, U.S.
- Died: July 7, 1982 (aged 85); Norwood, Massachusetts, U.S.
- Batted: Right Threw: Right

MLB debut
- July 5, 1917, for the Philadelphia Athletics

Last MLB appearance
- May 26, 1931, for the Detroit Tigers

MLB statistics
- Batting average: .280
- Home runs: 42
- Runs batted in: 567
- Stats at Baseball Reference

Teams
- Philadelphia Athletics (1917–1921); Boston Red Sox (1922); New York Yankees (1922–1928); Boston Braves (1929); Detroit Tigers (1931)

Career highlights and awards
- 3× World Series champion (1923, 1927, 1928)

Joseph Anthony Dugan (May 12, 1897 – July 7, 1982), was an American professional baseball player. Nicknamed "Jumping Joe", he was considered one of the best defensive third basemen of his era. He played in Major League Baseball as a shortstop and third baseman from 1917 through 1931, most notably for the Philadelphia Athletics and the New York Yankees, with whom he played in five World Series.

== Baseball career ==
Born in Mahanoy City, Pennsylvania, and later attending Hillhouse High School in New Haven, Connecticut, Dugan went directly from the College of the Holy Cross to the major leagues. He made his major league debut at the age of 20 with Connie Mack's Philadelphia Athletics on July 5, 1917. Dugan struggled as a hitter his first two years, batting a combined .195, but in 1919 he batted .271, then the next year hit .322. By 1920, Dugan was being cited as the best third baseman in the major leagues. He was moved permanently to third base in 1921, and would be a steady .280-.300 hitter as well as a fine defensive third baseman for the rest of his career.

It was in his first years in baseball that Dugan acquired the nickname of "Jumping", a nickname bestowed on him since he would often take unauthorized leaves from the team. After committing a few errors, he was booed by the Philadelphia fans. Sensitive and temperamental, he would leave the team until Mack was able to coax him back. Word of his departure spread around the league and, he would often be taunted by fans with the cry, "I want to go home!"

In 1922, Dugan was traded by the Athletics to the Boston Red Sox. On July 23, 1922 he was sent by the Red Sox to the New York Yankees in a controversial deal. Red Sox owner Harry Frazee had been unloading his Red Sox players almost haphazardly, and Dugan's acquisition by the Yankees helped them edge out the St. Louis Browns in a tight 1922 pennant race. Because Dugan's trade occurred in the latter part of the season, and worried that teams might try to buy their way to a pennant during the season, major league baseball would later move up its trading deadline to June 15.

Dugan had his most productive season in 1923, when he hit .283, scored 111 runs and led the league's third basemen in fielding percentage to help the Yankees win their first world championship. In a United Press International article, Dugan was proclaimed the hero of the 1923 World Series for his spectacular defensive performance as well as his timely hitting, which produced five runs batted in. Dugan posted a .302 batting average in 1924 and, in a year-end poll of major league baseball players, he was a near-unanimous selection as the best third baseman in the American League.

Yankees manager Miller Huggins named Dugan as his leadoff hitter at the beginning of the 1925 season. In August, he suffered a severely wrenched knee and had to miss the rest of the season. He posted a .292 batting average for the season and once again led American League third basemen in fielding percentage. Dugan was the starting third baseman on the 1927 Yankees, a team considered by many the greatest baseball team of all time, although by this time Dugan was past his prime as injuries began to take their toll. In August 1928, Huggins replaced Dugan at third base with Mike Gazella in an effort to get more offense from the lineup. After appearing in 94 games, the Yankees gave Dugan his unconditional release in December of that year.

He signed a contract to play for the Boston Braves in 1929 and finished the season with a .304 batting average in 60 games. Dugan did not play in 1930 but returned to play for the Detroit Tigers as a utility player in 1931. At the age of 34, he appeared in eight games before being released on May 29.

== Career statistics ==
In a 14-year major league career, Dugan played in 1,447 games, accumulating 1,516 hits in 5,410 at bats for a .280 career batting average along with 42 home runs, 567 runs batted in and a .317 on-base percentage. He finished his career with a .957 fielding percentage as a third baseman. Dugan played in five World Series with the Yankees, playing in 25 series games and batting .267 (24-for-90).

After his playing career, Dugan briefly managed in the minor leagues. Dugan died at Norwood Hospital on July 7, 1982 after suffering from a stroke and pneumonia at the age of 85.

== See also ==
- List of baseball players who went directly to Major League Baseball
