= 1920 Philadelphia Athletics season =

1920 Philadelphia Athletics
- League: American League
- Ballpark: Shibe Park
- City: Philadelphia
- Record: 48–106 (.312)
- League place: 8th
- Owners: Connie Mack, Benjamin Shibe, Tom Shibe and John Shibe
- Managers: Connie Mack

The 1920 Philadelphia Athletics season involved the A's finishing eighth in the American League with a record of 48 wins and 106 losses.

== Regular season ==
=== Season standings ===
American League
Team	W	L	Pct.	GB	Home	Road
Cleveland Indians	98	56	.636	—	51‍–‍27	47‍–‍29
Chicago White Sox	96	58	.623	2	52‍–‍25	44‍–‍33
New York Yankees	95	59	.617	3	49‍–‍28	46‍–‍31
St. Louis Browns	76	77	.497	21½	40‍–‍38	36‍–‍39
Boston Red Sox	72	81	.471	25½	41‍–‍35	31‍–‍46
Washington Senators	68	84	.447	29	37‍–‍38	31‍–‍46
Detroit Tigers	61	93	.396	37	32‍–‍46	29‍–‍47
Philadelphia Athletics	48	106	.312	50	25‍–‍50	23‍–‍56

=== Record vs. opponents ===
1920 American League record Sources:
Team	BOS	CWS	CLE	DET	NYY	PHA	SLB	WSH
Boston	—	12–10	6–16	13–9	9–13	13–9–1	9–13	10–11
Chicago	10–12	—	10–12	19–3	10–12	16–6	14–8	17–5
Cleveland	16–6	12–10	—	15–7	9–13	16–6	15–7	15–7
Detroit	9–13	3–19	7–15	—	7–15	12–10–1	10–12	13–9
New York	13–9	12–10	13–9	15–7	—	19–3	12–10	11–11
Philadelphia	9–13–1	6–16	6–16	10–12–1	3–19	—	8–14	6–16
St. Louis	13–9	8–14	7–15	12–10	10–12	14–8	—	12–9–1
Washington	11–10	5–17	7–15	9–13	11–11	16–6	9–12–1	—

=== Roster ===
1920 Philadelphia Athletics
Roster
Pitchers: Charlie Eckert; Slim Harriss; Bob Hasty; Fred Heimach; Dave Keefe; Walt Kinney; Bill Knowlton; Pat Martin; Roy Moore; Rollie Naylor; Scott Perry; Eddie Rommel; Bill Shanner; John Slappey	Catchers: Cy Perkins; Lena Styles; Johnny Walker; Ed Wingo; Infielders: Dick Burrus; Joe Dugan; Jimmy Dykes; Chick Galloway; Ivy Griffin; Bill Kelly; Emmett McCann; Red Shannon; Fred Thomas	Outfielders: Lyle Bigbee; George Burns; Charlie High; Paul Johnson; Glenn Myatt; Amos Strunk; Frank Walker; Tilly Walker; Frank Welch; Whitey Witt; Other batters: Teddy Kearns	Manager: Connie Mack

== Player stats ==
= Indicates team leader

=== Batting ===
==== Starters by position ====
Note: Pos = Position; G = Games played; AB = At bats; H = Hits; Avg. = Batting average; HR = Home runs; RBI = Runs batted in

Pos	Player	G	AB	H	Avg.	HR	RBI
C	Cy Perkins	148	492	128	.260	5	52
1B	Ivy Griffin	129	467	111	.238	0	20
2B	Jimmy Dykes	142	546	140	.256	8	35
SS	Chick Galloway	98	298	60	.201	0	18
3B	Joe Dugan	123	491	158	.322	3	60
OF	Tillie Walker	149	585	157	.268	17	82
OF	Amos Strunk	58	202	60	.297	0	20
OF	Frank Welch	100	360	93	.258	4	40

==== Other batters ====
Note: G = Games played; AB = At bats; H = Hits; Avg. = Batting average; HR = Home runs; RBI = Runs batted in

Player	G	AB	H	Avg.	HR	RBI
Fred Thomas	76	255	59	.231	1	11
Whitey Witt	65	218	70	.321	1	25
Glenn Myatt	70	196	49	.250	0	18
Dick Burrus	71	135	25	.185	0	10
Frank Walker	24	91	21	.231	0	10
Red Shannon	25	88	15	.170	0	3
Lyle Bigbee	38	75	14	.187	1	8
Paul Johnson	18	72	15	.208	0	5
Charlie High	17	65	20	.308	1	6
George Burns	22	60	14	.233	1	7
Lena Styles	24	50	13	.260	0	5
Emmett McCann	13	34	9	.265	0	3
Johnny Walker	9	22	5	.227	0	5
Bill Kelly	9	13	3	.231	0	0
Ed Wingo	1	4	1	.250	0	1
Teddy Kearns	1	1	0	.000	0	0

=== Pitching ===
= Indicates league leader

==== Starting pitchers ====
Note: G = Games pitched; IP = Innings pitched; W = Wins; L = Losses; ERA = Earned run average; SO = Strikeouts

Player	G	IP	W	L	ERA	SO
Scott Perry	42	263.2	11	25	3.62	79
Rollie Naylor	42	250.2	10	23	3.48	90
Slim Harriss	31	192.0	9	14	3.08	60
Walt Kinney	10	61.0	2	4	3.10	19
Bill Knowlton	1	5.2	0	1	4.76	5
Fred Heimach	1	5.0	0	1	14.40	0

==== Other pitchers ====
Note: G = Games pitched; IP = Innings pitched; W = Wins; L = Losses; ERA = Earned run average; SO = Strikeouts

Player	G	IP	W	L	ERA	SO
Eddie Rommel	34	174.1	7	7	2.84	43
Roy Moore	24	132.2	1	13	4.68	45
Dave Keefe	31	130.1	6	7	2.97	41
Bob Hasty	19	71.2	1	3	5.02	12
Lyle Bigbee	12	45.0	0	3	8.00	12
Pat Martin	8	32.1	1	4	6.12	14
John Slappey	3	6.1	0	1	7.11	1

==== Relief pitchers ====
Note: G = Games pitched; W = Wins; L = Losses; SV = Saves; ERA = Earned run average; SO = Strikeouts

Player	G	W	L	SV	ERA	SO
Charlie Eckert	2	0	0	0	4.76	1
Bill Shanner	1	0	0	0	6.75	1
