= 1922 Philadelphia Athletics season =

1922 Philadelphia Athletics
- League: American League
- Ballpark: Shibe Park
- City: Philadelphia
- Record: 65–89 (.422)
- League place: 7th
- Owners: Connie Mack, Tom Shibe and John Shibe
- Managers: Connie Mack

The 1922 Philadelphia Athletics season involved the A's finishing seventh in the American League with a record of 65 wins and 89 losses. It was the first season since they won the 1914 pennant that the Athletics did not finish in last place.

== Offseason ==
Ben Shibe, who had been part-owner of the Athletics since 1901, died on January 14, 1922. His eldest son, Tom Shibe, was named club president. Tom and his brother, John, would handle the business side of the club, while Connie Mack would continue to be in full charge of the baseball side.

== Regular season ==
=== Season standings ===
American League
Team	W	L	Pct.	GB	Home	Road
New York Yankees	94	60	.610	—	50‍–‍27	44‍–‍33
St. Louis Browns	93	61	.604	1	54‍–‍23	39‍–‍38
Detroit Tigers	79	75	.513	15	43‍–‍34	36‍–‍41
Cleveland Indians	78	76	.506	16	44‍–‍35	34‍–‍41
Chicago White Sox	77	77	.500	17	43‍–‍34	34‍–‍43
Washington Senators	69	85	.448	25	40‍–‍39	29‍–‍46
Philadelphia Athletics	65	89	.422	29	38‍–‍39	27‍–‍50
Boston Red Sox	61	93	.396	33	31‍–‍42	30‍–‍51

=== Record vs. opponents ===
1922 American League record Sources:
Team	BOS	CWS	CLE	DET	NYY	PHA	SLB	WSH
Boston	—	10–12	6–16	5–17	13–9	10–12	7–15	10–12
Chicago	12–10	—	12–10–1	17–5	9–13	12–10	8–14	7–15
Cleveland	16–6	10–12–1	—	15–7	7–15	11–11	6–16	13–9
Detroit	17–5	5–17	7–15	—	11–11	16–6–1	9–13	14–8
New York	9–13	13–9	15–7	11–11	—	17–5	14–8	15–7
Philadelphia	12–10	10–12	11–11	6–16–1	5–17	—	9–13	12–10
St. Louis	15–7	14–8	16–6	13–9	8–14	13–9	—	14–8
Washington	12–10	15–7	9–13	8–14	7–15	10–12	8–14	—

=== Roster ===
1922 Philadelphia Athletics
Roster
Pitchers: Charlie Eckert; Slim Harriss; Bob Hasty; Fred Heimach; Gus Ketchum; Roy Moore; Rollie Naylor; Harry O'Neill; Curly Ogden; Otto Rettig; Eddie Rommel; Red Schillings; Jim Sullivan; Rube Yarrison	Catchers: Johnny Berger; Frank Bruggy; Ollie Fuhrman; Cy Perkins; Infielders: Frank Brazill; Frank Callaway; Jimmy Dykes; Chick Galloway; Joe Hauser; Doc Johnston; Frank McCue; Heinie Scheer; Ralph Young	Outfielders: Beauty McGowan; Bing Miller; Tilly Walker; Frank Welch	Manager: Connie Mack

== Player stats ==
=== Batting ===
==== Starters by position ====
Note: Pos = Position; G = Games played; AB = At bats; H = Hits; Avg. = Batting average; HR = Home runs; RBI = Runs batted in

Pos	Player	G	AB	H	Avg.	HR	RBI
C	Cy Perkins	148	505	135	.267	6	69
1B	Joe Hauser	111	368	119	.323	9	43
2B	Ralph Young	125	470	105	.223	1	35
SS	Chick Galloway	155	571	185	.324	6	69
3B	Jimmy Dykes	145	501	138	.275	12	68
OF	Tillie Walker	153	565	160	.283	37	99
OF	Bing Miller	143	535	179	.335	21	90
OF	Frank Welch	114	375	97	.259	11	49

==== Other batters ====
Note: G = Games played; AB = At bats; H = Hits; Avg. = Batting average; HR = Home runs; RBI = Runs batted in

Player	G	AB	H	Avg.	HR	RBI
Beauty McGowan	99	300	69	.230	1	20
Doc Johnston	71	260	65	.250	1	29
Heinie Scheer	51	135	23	.170	4	12
Frank Bruggy	53	111	31	.279	0	9
Frank Callaway	29	48	13	.271	0	4
Frank Brazill	6	13	1	.077	0	1
Ollie Fuhrman	6	6	2	.333	0	0
Frank McCue	2	5	0	.000	0	0
Johnny Berger	2	1	1	1.000	0	0

=== Pitching ===
==== Starting pitchers ====
Note: G = Games pitched; IP = Innings pitched; W = Wins; L = Losses; ERA = Earned run average; SO = Strikeouts

Player	G	IP	W	L	ERA	SO
Eddie Rommel	51	294.0	27	13	3.28	54
Slim Harriss	47	229.2	9	20	5.02	102
Bob Hasty	28	192.1	9	14	4.26	33
Rollie Naylor	35	171.1	10	15	4.73	37
Otto Rettig	4	18.1	1	2	4.91	3

==== Other pitchers ====
Note: G = Games pitched; IP = Innings pitched; W = Wins; L = Losses; ERA = Earned run average; SO = Strikeouts

Player	G	IP	W	L	ERA	SO
Fred Heimach	37	171.2	7	11	5.03	47
Curly Ogden	15	72.1	1	4	3.11	20
Roy Moore	15	50.2	0	3	7.64	29

==== Relief pitchers ====
Note: G = Games pitched; W = Wins; L = Losses; SV = Saves; ERA = Earned run average; SO = Strikeouts

Player	G	W	L	SV	ERA	SO
Charlie Eckert	21	0	2	0	4.68	15
Jim Sullivan	20	0	2	0	5.44	15
Rube Yarrison	18	1	2	0	8.29	10
Gus Ketchum	6	0	1	0	5.62	4
Red Schillings	4	0	0	0	6.75	4
Harry O'Neill	1	0	0	0	3.00	0
