= 1923 Philadelphia Athletics season =

1923 Philadelphia Athletics
- League: American League
- Ballpark: Shibe Park
- City: Philadelphia
- Record: 69–83 (.454)
- League place: 6th
- Owners: Connie Mack, Tom Shibe and John Shibe
- Managers: Connie Mack

The 1923 Philadelphia Athletics season involved the A's finishing sixth in the American League with a record of 69 wins and 83 losses.

== Regular season ==
=== Season standings ===
American League
Team	W	L	Pct.	GB	Home	Road
New York Yankees	98	54	.645	—	46‍–‍30	52‍–‍24
Detroit Tigers	83	71	.539	16	45‍–‍32	38‍–‍39
Cleveland Indians	82	71	.536	16½	42‍–‍36	40‍–‍35
Washington Senators	75	78	.490	23½	43‍–‍34	32‍–‍44
St. Louis Browns	74	78	.487	24	40‍–‍36	34‍–‍42
Philadelphia Athletics	69	83	.454	29	34‍–‍41	35‍–‍42
Chicago White Sox	69	85	.448	30	30‍–‍45	39‍–‍40
Boston Red Sox	61	91	.401	37	37‍–‍40	24‍–‍51

=== Record vs. opponents ===
1923 American League record Sources:
Team	BOS	CWS	CLE	DET	NYY	PHA	SLB	WSH
Boston	—	9–13	10–12	10–12–1	8–14	13–7	4–18–1	7–15
Chicago	13–9	—	9–13	9–13	7–15	10–12	11–11–1	10–12–1
Cleveland	12–10	13–9	—	9–13	12–10	12–10	14–8	10–11
Detroit	12–10–1	13–9	13–9	—	10–12	12–10	12–10	11–11
New York	14–8	15–7	10–12	12–10	—	16–6	15–5	16–6
Philadelphia	7–13	12–10	10–12	10–12	6–16	—	9–13	15–7–1
St. Louis	18–4–1	11–11–1	8–14	10–12	5–15	13–9	—	9–13
Washington	15–7	12–10–1	11–10	11–11	6–16	7–15–1	13–9	—

=== Roster ===
1923 Philadelphia Athletics
Roster
Pitchers: Dennis Burns; Slim Harriss; Bob Hasty; Fred Heimach; Hank Hulvey; Al Kellett; Ren Kelly; Walt Kinney; Roy Meeker; Rollie Naylor; Harry O'Neill; Curly Ogden; Doc Ozmer; Eddie Rommel; Rube Walberg; Chuck Wolfe	Catchers: Frank Bruggy; Cy Perkins; Chuck Rowland; Infielders: Jimmy Dykes; Chick Galloway; Sammy Hale; Joe Hauser; Harry Riconda; Heinie Scheer; Doc Wood	Outfielders: Walter French; John Jones; Wid Matthews; Beauty McGowan; Bing Miller; Tilly Walker; Frank Welch	Manager: Connie Mack

== Player stats ==
=== Batting ===
==== Starters by position ====
Note: Pos = Position; G = Games played; AB = At bats; H = Hits; Avg. = Batting average; HR = Home runs; RBI = Runs batted in

Pos	Player	G	AB	H	Avg.	HR	RBI
C	Cy Perkins	143	500	135	.270	2	65
1B	Joe Hauser	146	537	165	.307	17	94
2B	Jimmy Dykes	124	416	105	.252	4	43
SS	Chick Galloway	134	504	140	.278	2	62
3B	Sammy Hale	115	434	125	.288	3	51
OF	Bing Miller	123	458	137	.299	12	64
OF	Wid Matthews	129	485	133	.274	1	25
OF	Frank Welch	125	421	125	.297	4	55

==== Other batters ====
Note: G = Games played; AB = At bats; H = Hits; Avg. = Batting average; HR = Home runs; RBI = Runs batted in

Player	G	AB	H	Avg.	HR	RBI
Beauty McGowan	95	287	73	.254	1	19
Heinie Scheer	69	210	50	.238	2	21
Harry Riconda	55	175	46	.263	0	12
Tillie Walker	52	109	30	.275	2	16
Frank Bruggy	54	105	22	.210	1	6
Walter French	16	39	9	.231	0	2
Chuck Rowland	5	6	0	.000	0	0
John Jones	1	4	1	.250	0	1
Doc Wood	3	3	1	.333	0	0

=== Pitching ===
==== Starting pitchers ====
Note: G = Games pitched; IP = Innings pitched; W = Wins; L = Losses; ERA = Earned run average; SO = Strikeouts

Player	G	IP	W	L	ERA	SO
Eddie Rommel	56	297.2	18	19	3.27	76
Bob Hasty	44	243.1	13	15	4.44	56
Rollie Naylor	26	143.0	12	7	3.46	27
Hank Hulvey	1	7.0	0	1	7.71	2

==== Other pitchers ====
Note: G = Games pitched; IP = Innings pitched; W = Wins; L = Losses; ERA = Earned run average; SO = Strikeouts

Player	G	IP	W	L	ERA	SO
Slim Harriss	46	209.1	10	16	4.00	89
Fred Heimach	40	208.1	6	12	4.32	63
Rube Walberg	26	115.1	4	8	5.32	38
Dennis Burns	4	27.2	2	1	2.00	8
Roy Meeker	5	25.2	3	0	3.60	12
Walt Kinney	5	12.0	0	1	7.50	9

==== Relief pitchers ====
Note: G = Games pitched; W = Wins; L = Losses; SV = Saves; ERA = Earned run average; SO = Strikeouts

Player	G	W	L	SV	ERA	SO
Curly Ogden	18	1	2	0	5.63	14
Al Kellett	5	0	1	0	6.30	1
Chuck Wolfe	3	0	0	0	3.72	1
Harry O'Neill	3	0	0	0	0.00	2
Ren Kelly	1	0	0	0	2.57	1
Doc Ozmer	1	0	0	0	4.50	1
