= 1924 Philadelphia Athletics season =

1924 Philadelphia Athletics
- League: American League
- Ballpark: Shibe Park
- City: Philadelphia
- Record: 71–81 (.467)
- League place: 5th
- Owners: Connie Mack, Tom Shibe and John Shibe
- Managers: Connie Mack

The 1924 Philadelphia Athletics season involved the A's finishing fifth in the American League with a record of 71 wins and 81 losses.

== Offseason ==
- December 11, 1923: Harry O'Neill, Hank Hulvey, Pinky Pittenger and $35,000 were traded by the Athletics to the Salt Lake City Bees for Paul Strand.
- December 15, 1923: Wid Matthews, Heinie Scheer, and $40,000 were traded by the Athletics to the Milwaukee Brewers for Al Simmons.

== Regular season ==
=== Season standings ===
American League
Team	W	L	Pct.	GB	Home	Road
Washington Senators	92	62	.597	—	47‍–‍30	45‍–‍32
New York Yankees	89	63	.586	2	45‍–‍32	44‍–‍31
Detroit Tigers	86	68	.558	6	45‍–‍33	41‍–‍35
St. Louis Browns	74	78	.487	17	41‍–‍36	33‍–‍42
Philadelphia Athletics	71	81	.467	20	36‍–‍39	35‍–‍42
Cleveland Indians	67	86	.438	24½	37‍–‍38	30‍–‍48
Boston Red Sox	67	87	.435	25	41‍–‍36	26‍–‍51
Chicago White Sox	66	87	.431	25½	37‍–‍39	29‍–‍48

=== Record vs. opponents ===
1924 American League record Sources:
Team	BOS	CWS	CLE	DET	NYY	PHA	SLB	WSH
Boston	—	10–12	14–8	6–16	5–17–1	12–10	11–11–1	9–13–1
Chicago	12–10	—	11–11	8–14–1	6–16	11–11	13–8	5–17
Cleveland	8–14	11–11	—	7–15	8–14	11–11	11–10	11–11
Detroit	16–6	14–8–1	15–7	—	13–9	11–11	9–13	8–14–1
New York	17–5–1	16–6	14–8	9–13	—	12–8	12–10	9–13
Philadelphia	10–12	11–11	11–11	11–11	8–12	—	13–9	7–15
St. Louis	11–11–1	8–13	10–11	13–9	10–12	9–13	—	13–9
Washington	13–9–1	17–5	11–11	14–8–1	13–9	15–7	9–13	—

=== Notable transactions ===
- July 1924: Jimmie Foxx was purchased by the Athletics from the Easton Farmers.

=== Roster ===
1924 Philadelphia Athletics
Roster
Pitchers: Stan Baumgartner; Dennis Burns; Sam Gray; Slim Harriss; Bob Hasty; Fred Heimach; Roy Meeker; Rollie Naylor; Curly Ogden; William Pierson; Eddie Rommel; Rube Walberg	Catchers: Frank Bruggy; Charlie Gibson; Cy Perkins; Infielders: Max Bishop; John Chapman; Jimmy Dykes; Chick Galloway; Sammy Hale; Joe Hauser; Harry Riconda	Outfielders: Bill Lamar; Bing Miller; Al Simmons; Paul Strand; Amos Strunk; Frank Welch; Other batters: Joe Green; Ed Sherling	Manager: Connie Mack; Coaches: Earle Mack; Danny Murphy

== Player stats ==
=== Batting ===
==== Starters by position ====
Note: Pos = Position; G = Games played; AB = At bats; H = Hits; Avg. = Batting average; HR = Home runs; RBI = Runs batted in

Pos	Player	G	AB	H	Avg.	HR	RBI
C	Cy Perkins	128	392	95	.242	0	32
1B	Joe Hauser	149	562	162	.288	27	115
2B	Max Bishop	91	294	75	.255	2	21
SS	Chick Galloway	129	464	128	.276	2	48
3B	Harry Riconda	83	281	71	.253	1	21
OF	Al Simmons	152	594	183	.308	8	102
OF	Bill Lamar	87	367	121	.330	7	48
OF	Bing Miller	113	398	136	.342	6	62

==== Other batters ====
Note: G = Games played; AB = At bats; H = Hits; Avg. = Batting average; HR = Home runs; RBI = Runs batted in

Player	G	AB	H	Avg.	HR	RBI
Jimmy Dykes	110	410	128	.312	3	50
Frank Welch	94	293	85	.290	5	31
Sammy Hale	80	261	83	.318	2	17
Paul Strand	47	167	38	.228	0	13
Frank Bruggy	50	113	30	.265	0	8
John Chapman	19	71	20	.282	0	7
Amos Strunk	30	42	6	.143	0	1
Charlie Gibson	12	15	2	.133	0	1
Ed Sherling	4	2	1	.500	0	0
Joe Green	1	1	0	.000	0	0

=== Pitching ===
==== Starting pitchers ====
Note: G = Games pitched; IP = Innings pitched; W = Wins; L = Losses; ERA = Earned run average; SO = Strikeouts

Player	G	IP	W	L	ERA	SO
Eddie Rommel	43	278.0	18	15	3.95	72

==== Other pitchers ====
Note: G = Games pitched; IP = Innings pitched; W = Wins; L = Losses; ERA = Earned run average; SO = Strikeouts

Player	G	IP	W	L	ERA	SO
Fred Heimach	40	198.0	14	12	4.73	60
Stan Baumgartner	36	181.0	13	6	2.88	45
Dennis Burns	37	154.0	6	8	5.04	26
Sam Gray	34	151.2	8	7	3.98	54
Roy Meeker	30	146.0	5	12	4.68	37
Slim Harriss	36	123.0	6	10	4.68	45
Bob Hasty	18	52.2	1	3	5.64	15
Rollie Naylor	10	38.1	0	5	6.34	10
Curly Ogden	5	12.2	0	3	4.97	4
Rube Walberg	6	7.0	0	0	12.86	3

==== Relief pitchers ====
Note: G = Games pitched; W = Wins; L = Losses; SV = Saves; ERA = Earned run average; SO = Strikeouts

Player	G	W	L	SV	ERA	SO
William Pierson	1	0	0	0	3.38	0
