= 1925 Philadelphia Athletics season =

1925 Philadelphia Athletics
- League: American League
- Ballpark: Shibe Park
- City: Philadelphia
- Record: 88–64 (.579)
- League place: 2nd
- Owners: Connie Mack, Tom Shibe and John Shibe
- Managers: Connie Mack

The 1925 Philadelphia Athletics season involved the A's finishing second in the American League with a record of 88 wins and 64 losses. It was the Athletics' first winning season in 11 years (1914).

== Offseason ==
- October 8, 1924: Lefty Grove was purchased by the Athletics from the Baltimore Orioles for $100,600.
- November 17, 1924: Harry Riconda, Dennis Burns, Bob Hasty, Ed Sherling, Charles Rowland (minors), and $50,000 were traded by the Athletics to the Portland Beavers for Mickey Cochrane.

== Regular season ==
=== Season standings ===
American League
Team	W	L	Pct.	GB	Home	Road
Washington Senators	96	55	.636	—	53‍–‍22	43‍–‍33
Philadelphia Athletics	88	64	.579	8½	51‍–‍26	37‍–‍38
St. Louis Browns	82	71	.536	15	45‍–‍32	37‍–‍39
Detroit Tigers	81	73	.526	16½	43‍–‍34	38‍–‍39
Chicago White Sox	79	75	.513	18½	44‍–‍33	35‍–‍42
Cleveland Indians	70	84	.455	27½	37‍–‍39	33‍–‍45
New York Yankees	69	85	.448	28½	42‍–‍36	27‍–‍49
Boston Red Sox	47	105	.309	49½	28‍–‍47	19‍–‍58

=== Record vs. opponents ===
1925 American League record Sources:
Team	BOS	CWS	CLE	DET	NYY	PHA	SLB	WSH
Boston	—	9–13	7–15	5–17	9–13	5–17	5–16	7–14
Chicago	13–9	—	14–8	13–9	13–9	8–14	9–13	9–13
Cleveland	15–7	8–14	—	11–11–1	10–12	11–11	11–11	4–18
Detroit	17–5	9–13	11–11–1	—	14–8–1	8–14	12–10	10–12
New York	13–9	9–13	12–10	8–14–1	—	9–13	11–11–1	7–15
Philadelphia	17–5	14–8	11–11	14–8	13–9	—	12–10	7–13–1
St. Louis	16–5	13–9	11–11	10–12	11–11–1	10–12	—	11–11
Washington	14–7	13–9	18–4	12–10	15–7	13–7–1	11–11	—

=== Roster ===
1925 Philadelphia Athletics
Roster
Pitchers: Elbert Andrews; Stan Baumgartner; Tom Glass; Sam Gray; Lefty Grove; Slim Harriss; Fred Heimach; Jack Quinn; Eddie Rommel; Art Stokes; Rube Walberg; Lefty Willis	Catchers: Charlie Berry; Mickey Cochrane; Jimmie Foxx; Cy Perkins; Infielders: Max Bishop; Jimmy Dykes; Charlie Engle; Chick Galloway; Doc Gautreau; Sammy Hale; Red Holt; Carl Husta; Jim Keesey; Jim Poole; Red Smith	Outfielders: Bill Bagwell; Walter French; Bill Lamar; Bing Miller; Al Simmons; Frank Welch	Manager: Connie Mack; Coaches: Earle Mack

== Player stats ==
=== Batting ===
==== Starters by position ====
Note: Pos = Position; G = Games played; AB = At bats; H = Hits; Avg. = Batting average; HR = Home runs; RBI = Runs batted in

Pos	Player	G	AB	H	Avg.	HR	RBI
C	Mickey Cochrane	134	420	139	.331	6	55
1B	Jim Poole	133	480	143	.298	5	67
2B	Max Bishop	105	368	103	.280	4	27
SS	Chick Galloway	149	481	116	.241	3	71
3B	Sammy Hale	110	391	135	.345	8	63
OF	Al Simmons	153	654	253	.387	24	129
OF	Bill Lamar	138	568	202	.356	3	77
OF	Bing Miller	124	474	151	.319	10	81

==== Other batters ====
Note: G = Games played; AB = At bats; H = Hits; Avg. = Batting average; HR = Home runs; RBI = Runs batted in

Player	G	AB	H	Avg.	HR	RBI
Jimmy Dykes	122	465	150	.323	5	55
Frank Welch	85	202	56	.277	4	41
Cy Perkins	65	140	43	.307	1	18
Walter French	67	100	37	.370	0	14
Red Holt	27	88	24	.273	1	8
Bill Bagwell	36	50	15	.300	0	10
Carl Husta	6	22	3	.136	0	2
Red Smith	20	14	4	.286	0	1
Charlie Berry	10	14	3	.214	0	3
Jimmie Foxx	10	9	6	.667	0	0
Doc Gautreau	4	7	0	.000	0	0
Jim Keesey	5	5	2	.400	0	1
Charlie Engle	1	0	0	----	0	0

=== Pitching ===
==== Starting pitchers ====
Note: G = Games pitched; IP = Innings pitched; W = Wins; L = Losses; ERA = Earned run average; SO = Strikeouts

Player	G	IP	W	L	ERA	SO
Slim Harriss	46	252.2	19	12	3.49	95
Sam Gray	32	203.2	16	8	3.27	80
Jack Quinn	18	99.2	6	3	3.88	19
Lefty Willis	1	5.0	0	0	10.80	3

==== Other pitchers ====
Note: G = Games pitched; IP = Innings pitched; W = Wins; L = Losses; ERA = Earned run average; SO = Strikeouts

Player	G	IP	W	L	ERA	SO
Eddie Rommel	52	261.0	21	10	3.69	67
Lefty Grove	45	197.0	10	12	4.75	116
Rube Walberg	53	191.2	8	14	3.99	82
Stan Baumgartner	37	113.1	6	3	3.57	18

==== Relief pitchers ====
Note: G = Games pitched; W = Wins; L = Losses; SV = Saves; ERA = Earned run average; SO = Strikeouts

Player	G	W	L	SV	ERA	SO
Art Stokes	12	1	1	0	4.07	7
Fred Heimach	10	0	1	0	3.98	6
Elbert Andrews	6	0	0	0	10.13	0
Tom Glass	2	1	0	0	5.40	2

== Awards and honors ==
=== League leaders ===
- Lefty Grove – American League leader, Strikeouts

== Farm system ==
Level	Team	League	Manager
B	Wilkes-Barre Barons	New York–Pennsylvania League	James Sharp and George Maisel
