= List of Philadelphia and Kansas City Athletics Opening Day starting pitchers =

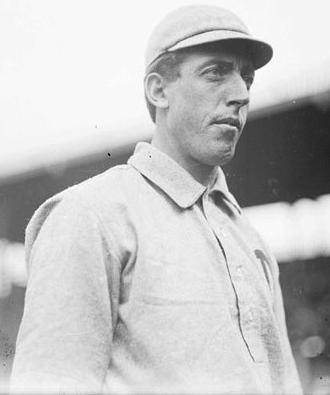
Eddie Plank made three Opening Day starts for the Athletics.

The Athletics are a Major League Baseball team that was originally based in Philadelphia. They moved to Kansas City, Missouri, in 1956 before moving to Oakland, California, in 1968. They have always played in the American League. During the 20th century until their move to Kansas City, they played their home games primarily at two home ball parks: Columbia Park until 1908, and Shibe Park (renamed Connie Mack Stadium in 1953) from 1909 through 1967. Their home ball park in Kansas City was Municipal Stadium. The first game of the new baseball season for a team is played on Opening Day, and being named the Opening Day starter is an honor, which is often given to the player who is expected to lead the pitching staff that season, though there are various strategic reasons why a team's best pitcher might not start on Opening Day.

The Athletics played their first game on April 26, 1901, at Columbia Park. Chick Fraser was the Opening Day starter for that game, which the Athletics lost to the Washington Senators by a score of 5–1. The Athletics used 45 different Opening Day starting pitchers in their 67 seasons prior to moving to Oakland. The Athletics won 32 of those games against 35 losses in those Opening Day starts.

Lefty Grove and Alex Kellner had the most Opening Day starts for the Philadelphia and Kansas City Athletics with four. Grove made four Opening Day starts for the Philadelphia Athletics in 1925, 1927, 1928 and 1930. Kellner made two Opening Day starts for the Philadelphia Athletics in 1952 and 1953, and two Opening Day starts for the Kansas City Athletics in 1955 and 1956. Eddie Plank (1904, 1909, 1910), Chief Bender (1905, 1906, 1911), Jack Coombs (1907, 1912, 1913), Scott Perry (1919–1921) and Phil Marchildon (1942, 1947, 1948) each made three Opening Day starts for the Philadelphia and Kansas City Athletics. The other pitchers who made multiple Opening Day starts for the Philadelphia and Kansas City Athletics are Bullet Joe Bush, Sugar Cain, Chubby Dean, Lum Harris, Slim Harriss and Bobby Shantz. Catfish Hunter made one Opening Day start for the Kansas City Athletics, but later made three Opening Day starts for the Oakland Athletics, giving him a total of four for the franchise.

In the ten years from 1904 through 1913 the Athletics used four different Opening Day starting pitchers. Plank, Bender and Coombs each made three Opening Day starts during that span. The other Opening Day start during that span was made by Nick Carter in 1908. Carter made that start despite never having pitched in Major League Baseball prior to 1908 and, as it turned out, 1908 was Carter's only year in the Major Leagues.

When the Athletics moved to Kansas City in 1955, Alex Kellner was the Opening Day starting pitcher. The Athletics won the game by a score of 6–2 over the Detroit Tigers. Kellner was the Opening Day starter for the Athletics again in 1956. However, in the 12 seasons from 1956 through their last season in Kansas City, 1967, the Athletics used a different Opening Day starting pitcher every season.

The Philadelphia Athletics were the American League champions nine times—1902, 1905, 1910, 1911, 1913, 1914 and 1929 through 1931. They won the World Series five times, in 1910, 1911, 1913, 1929 and 1930 (no World Series was played in 1902). In the seasons in which the Athletics won the World Series, their Opening Day starting pitchers were Plank (1910), Bender (1911), Coombs (1913), Carroll Yerkes (1929) and Grove (1930). The Athletics lost their Opening Day game in 1910 and 1911, but won in 1913, 1929 and 1930. The Kansas City Athletics never won and American League or World Series championship.

== Key ==
Year	Each year is linked to an article about that particular Athletics season.
W	Win
L	Loss
ND (W)	No Decision by starting pitcher; Athletics won game
ND (L)	No Decision by starting pitcher; Athletics lost game
(W)	Athletics won game; no information on starting pitcher's decision
(L)	Athletics lost game; no information on starting pitcher's decision
Location	Stadium in italics for home game
(#)	Number of appearances as Opening Day starter
**	AL Champions
†	World Series Champions

== Pitchers ==
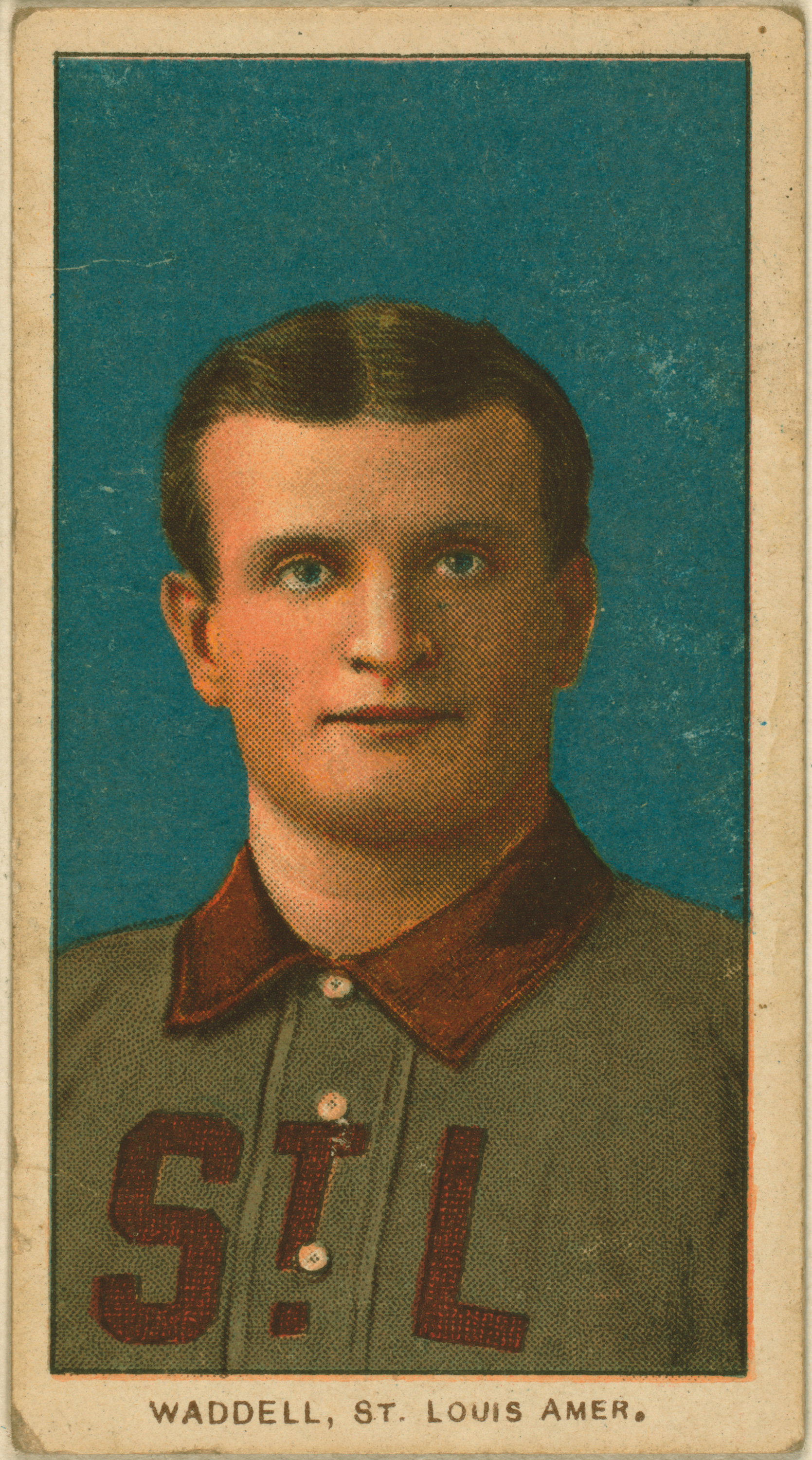
Rube Waddell was the Athletics' Opening Day starting pitcher in 1903.

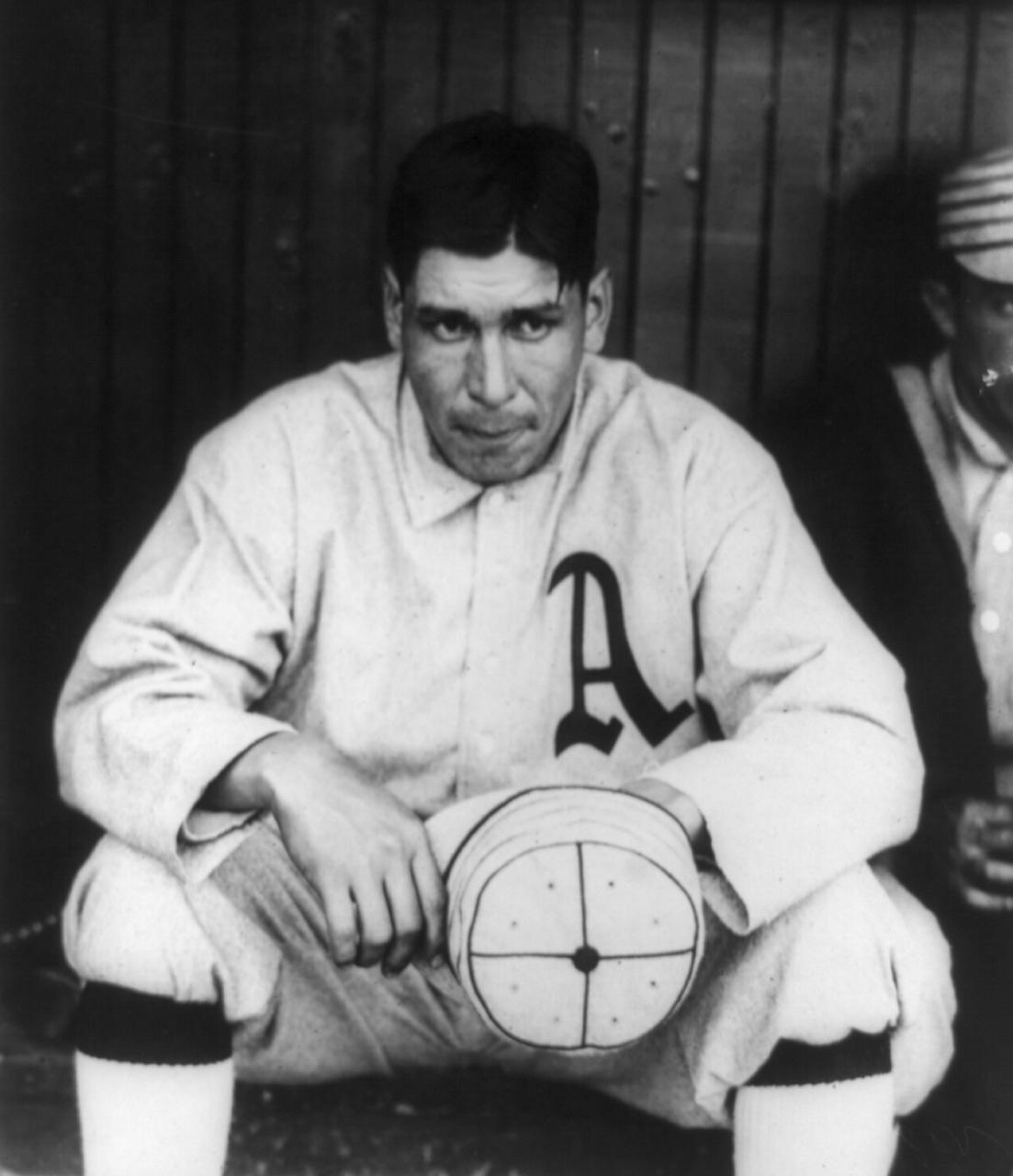
Chief Bender made three Opening Day starts for the Athletics.

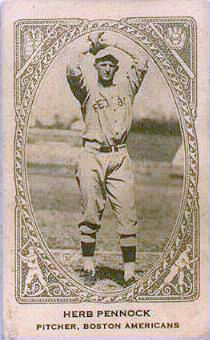
Hall of Famer Herb Pennock was the Athletics Opening Day starter in 1915.

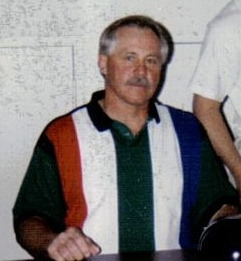
Catfish Hunter made his first of four Opening Day starts for the Athletics franchise with the Kansas City Athletics in 1966.

Year	Pitcher	Decision	Opponent	Location	Reference
1901	Chick Fraser	(L)	Washington Senators	Columbia Park	
1902**	Bill Bernhard	(W)	Baltimore Orioles	Oriole Park	
1903	Rube Waddell	(L)	Boston Red Sox	Huntington Avenue Grounds	
1904	Eddie Plank	(W)	Washington Senators	American League Park II	
1905**	Chief Bender	(W)	Boston Red Sox	Columbia Park	
1906	Chief Bender (2)	(W)	Washington Senators	American League Park II	
1907	Jack Coombs	(L)	Boston Red Sox	Columbia Park	
1908	Nick Carter	(L)	New York Yankees	Hilltop Park	
1909	Eddie Plank (2)	(W)	Boston Red Sox	Shibe Park	
1910†	Eddie Plank (3)	(L)	Washington Senators	American League Park II	
1911†	Chief Bender (3)	(L)	New York Yankees	Shibe Park	
1912	Jack Coombs (2)	(W)	Washington Senators	Shibe Park	
1913†	Jack Coombs (3)	ND (W)	Boston Red Sox	Fenway Park	
1914**	Joe Bush	(L)	New York Yankees	Polo Grounds	
1915	Herb Pennock	(W)	Boston Red Sox	Shibe Park	
1916	Jack Nabors	(L)	Boston Red Sox	Fenway Park	
1917	Joe Bush (2)	(L)	Washington Senators	Shibe Park	
1918	Elmer Myers	(L)	Boston Red Sox	Fenway Park	
1919	Scott Perry	(L)	Washington Senators	Griffith Park	
1920	Scott Perry (2)	(W)	New York Yankees	Shibe Park	
1921	Scott Perry (3)	(L)	New York Yankees	Polo Grounds	
1922	Rollie Naylor	(W)	Boston Red Sox	Fenway Park	
1923	Slim Harriss	(W)	Washington Senators	Shibe Park	
1924	Slim Harriss (2)	(L)	Washington Senators	Griffith Park	
1925	Lefty Grove	(W)	Boston Red Sox	Shibe Park	
1926	Eddie Rommel	(L)	Washington Senators	Griffith Park	
1927	Lefty Grove (2)	(L)	New York Yankees	Yankee Stadium	
1928	Lefty Grove (3)	(L)	New York Yankees	Shibe Park	
1929†	Carroll Yerkes	(W)	Washington Senators	Griffith Park	
1930†	Lefty Grove (4)	(W)	New York Yankees	Shibe Park	
1931**	Rube Walberg	(W)	Washington Senators	Griffith Park	
1932	George Earnshaw	(L)	New York Yankees	Shibe Park	
1933	Tony Freitas	(L)	Washington Senators	Griffith Park	
1934	Sugar Cain	(W)	New York Yankees	Shibe Park	
1935	Sugar Cain (2)	(L)	Washington Senators	Griffith Park	
1936	Bill Dietrich	(L)	Boston Red Sox	Fenway Park	
1937	Eddie Smith	(W)	Washington Senators	Griffith Park	
1938	Harry Kelley	(L)	Washington Senators	Griffith Park	
1939	George Caster	(W)	Washington Senators	Shibe Park	
1940	Chubby Dean	(W)	New York Yankees	Shibe Park	
1941	Chubby Dean (2)	(W)	New York Yankees	Yankee Stadium	
1942	Phil Marchildon	(L)	Boston Red Sox	Fenway Park	
1943	Lum Harris	(L)	Washington Senators	Griffith Stadium	
1944	Lum Harris (2)	(W)	Washington Senators	Griffith Stadium	
1945	Bobo Newsom	(L)	Washington Senators	Shibe Park	
1946	Russ Christopher	(L)	New York Yankees	Shibe Park	
1947	Phil Marchildon (2)	(W)	New York Yankees	Yankee Stadium	
1948	Phil Marchildon (3)	(W)	Boston Red Sox	Fenway Park	
1949	Dick Fowler	(L)	Washington Senators	Griffith Stadium	
1950	Carl Scheib	(L)	Washington Senators	Griffith Stadium	
1951	Bobby Shantz	(L)	Washington Senators	Shibe Park	
1952	Alex Kellner	(L)	New York Yankees	Shibe Park	
1953	Alex Kellner (2)	(W)	New York Yankees	Yankee Stadium	
1954	Bobby Shantz (2)	(W)	Boston Red Sox	Shibe Park	
1955	Alex Kellner (3)	W	Detroit Tigers	Municipal Stadium	
1956	Alex Kellner (4)	W	Detroit Tigers	Tiger Stadium	
1957	Tom Morgan	W	Detroit Tigers	Municipal Stadium	
1958	Ned Garver	W	Cleveland Indians	Cleveland Stadium	
1959	Bob Grim	L	Cleveland Indians	Municipal Stadium	
1960	Bud Daley	ND (L)	Chicago White Sox	Comiskey Park	
1961	Ray Herbert	W	Boston Red Sox	Fenway Park	
1962	Ed Rakow	W	Minnesota Twins	Municipal Stadium	
1963	Diego Segui	L	New York Yankees	Municipal Stadium	
1964	Orlando Peña	L	Detroit Tigers	Tiger Stadium	
1965	Moe Drabowsky	L	Detroit Tigers	Municipal Stadium	
1966	Catfish Hunter	L	Minnesota Twins	Metropolitan Stadium	
1967	Jim Nash	W	Cleveland Indians	Municipal Stadium	
