= Joe Green (baseball, born 1897) =

American baseball player

- Pinch hitter
- Born: September 17, 1897; Philadelphia, Pennsylvania
- Died: February 2, 1972 (aged 74); Bryn Mawr, Pennsylvania
- Batted: Right Threw: Right

MLB debut
- July 2, 1924, for the Philadelphia Athletics

Last MLB appearance
- July 2, 1924, for the Philadelphia Athletics

MLB statistics
- Batting average: .000 (0-for-1)
- Games played: 1
- Stats at Baseball Reference

Teams
- Philadelphia Athletics (1924)

Joseph Henry Green (September 17, 1897 – February 2, 1972) was an American professional baseball player who made a single appearance with the 1924 Philadelphia Athletics of Major League Baseball (MLB). Listed at 6 feet 2 inches (1.88 m) and 170 pounds (77 kg), he batted and threw right-handed.

== Biography ==
Box score of Green's only major league appearance

Baseball records do not indicate that Green played minor league baseball. He appeared in a single major league game, for the Philadelphia Athletics on July 2, 1924. The Altoona Tribune noted that Green had been playing for a semi-professional team associated with the Strawbridge and Clothier Store of Philadelphia as an outfielder. With the Athletics facing the New York Yankees in the second game of a home doubleheader at Shibe Park, Green entered the game as a pinch hitter, batting for starting pitcher Fred Heimach. Green's at bat came in the bottom of the second inning with the Yankees holding a 3–0 lead; facing pitcher Herb Pennock with two outs and runners at first and third, Green hit into a force out at second base, ending the inning. Green did not play defensively, as he was replaced by reliever Bob Hasty, who pitched the final seven innings for the Athletics. Pennock pitched a complete game as the Yankees won, 10–1. By mid-July, Green was back playing with the Strawbridge and Clothier Store semi-professional team.

Green was born in 1897 in Philadelphia. His draft registration card of September 1918 indicates that he was employed at the Budd Company in Philadelphia as a mechanical draftsman. Green died in 1972 in Bryn Mawr, Pennsylvania, and was interred in Arlington Cemetery in Drexel Hill, Pennsylvania.
