= Gus Ketchum =

American baseball player (1897–1980)

- Pitcher
- Born: March 21, 1897; Royse City, Texas, U.S.
- Died: September 6, 1980 (aged 83); Oklahoma City, Oklahoma, U.S.
- Batted: Right Threw: Right

MLB debut
- August 7, 1922, for the Philadelphia Athletics

Last MLB appearance
- September 28, 1922, for the Philadelphia Athletics

MLB statistics
- Win–loss record: 0–1
- Earned run average: 5.62
- Strikeouts: 4
- Stats at Baseball Reference

Teams
- Philadelphia Athletics (1922)

Augustus Franklin Ketchum (March 21, 1897 – September 6, 1980) (Note: Full name and date of birth are as listed by MLB.com and Retrosheet. Ketchum's draft registration card of February 1942 gives his first name simply as "Gus", date of birth as March 21 but in 1898, and place of birth as Rockwall, Texas. His entry in the Social Security Death Index also lists his first name simply as "Gus".) was an American professional baseball pitcher who played in six games for the 1922 Philadelphia Athletics of Major League Baseball (MLB). Listed at 5 feet 9.5 inches (1.765 m) and 170 pounds (77 kg), he threw and batted right-handed.

== Biography ==
Ketchum played in minor league baseball from 1922 to 1930, except for 1928. In 180 minor league pitching appearances, he accrued a 41–56 win–loss record.

In August and September 1922, Ketchum pitched in six games for the Philadelphia Athletics, the only major league appearances of his career. The Athletics had purchased his contract from the minor league Ardmore Producers for $1750 on July 11. In six relief appearances totaling 16 innings, he compiled an 0–1 record with a 5.62 earned run average while striking out four batters. His loss came on August 11 in a road game against the New York Yankees at the Polo Grounds; entering a 2–2 tie game, Ketchum pitched a scoreless eighth inning, then allowed a run in the ninth on two walks, a sacrifice bunt, and a game-winning single by opposing pitcher Bullet Joe Bush.

Born in 1897 in Royse City, Texas, Ketchum died in 1980 in Oklahoma City, Oklahoma, and was interred in Altus, Oklahoma.
