= Russ Christopher =

American baseball player (1917–1954)

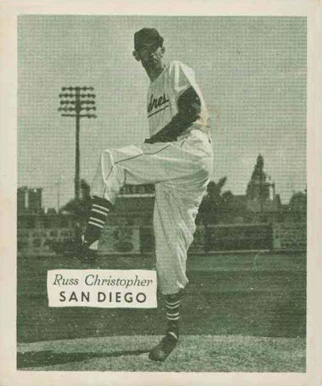
- Pitcher
- Born: September 12, 1917; Richmond, California, U.S.
- Died: December 5, 1954 (aged 37); Richmond, California, U.S.
- Batted: Right Threw: Right

MLB debut
- April 14, 1942, for the Philadelphia Athletics

Last MLB appearance
- October 1, 1948, for the Cleveland Indians

MLB statistics
- Win–loss record: 54–64
- Earned run average: 3.37
- Strikeouts: 424
- Stats at Baseball Reference

Teams
- Philadelphia Athletics (1942–1947); Cleveland Indians (1948)

Career highlights and awards
- All-Star (1945); World Series champion (1948)

Russell Ormand Christopher (September 12, 1917 – December 5, 1954) was an American professional baseball pitcher who played in Major League Baseball for seven seasons with the Philadelphia Athletics (1942–1947) and Cleveland Indians (1948). In 241 career games, Christopher pitched 999 2/3 innings and posted a win–loss record of 54–64, with 46 complete games, three shutouts, and a 3.37 earned run average (ERA).

A 6'3, 180 lb. player from Richmond, California, he played minor league baseball in the New York Yankees organization before being acquired by the Athletics in the rule 5 draft. Christopher joined the Athletics' major league roster in 1942 and played six seasons for them, and made his only All-Star appearance in 1945. He was traded to the Indians before the 1948 season, and played one year of baseball with them. After the season ended, he retired due to health concerns and worked at an aircraft plant until his death in 1954.

== Early life and minor leagues ==
Christopher was born in Richmond, California. His brother, Loyd Christopher, went on to become a major league outfielder. Loyd was the one first interested in becoming a professional baseball player, but would not sign a contract unless Russ signed one as well. As a child, Christopher had a case of rheumatic fever, which damaged his heart.

He had his first taste of professional baseball in 1938, when he signed with the Clovis Pioneers of the West Texas–New Mexico League. He pitched in 13 games for the Pioneers, posting a 7–5 record, 106 innings pitched and a 4.50 ERA. The following year, Christopher joined the El Paso Texans, the rookie-level minor league team of the New York Yankees farm system. In 32 games with the Texans, he posted an 18–7 record, pitched 225 innings and had an ERA of 3.68. He was promoted in 1940 to the Wenatchee Chiefs of the Western International League, where he finished the year with an 8–8 record and a 4.72 ERA in 20 games. At the end of the season, he was promoted to the Newark Bears of the International League along with seven other minor league players.

In his lone season with the Bears, Christopher pitched in 31 games. Among those games was a four-hit shutout against the Rochester Red Wings in the International League playoffs to put the Bears up two games to none. In the championship series against the Montreal Royals, Christopher pitched seven solid innings in a victory for the Bears, but injured his back and did not play another game that season. He finished the season with a 16–7 record, a 2.82 ERA and 12 complete games. At the conclusion of the season, Christopher was considered the top prospect in the Rule 5 draft, and the Philadelphia Athletics selected him with the first pick of the draft.

== Philadelphia Athletics ==
After pitching with the Athletics in spring training, manager Connie Mack placed Christopher on the major league roster, and he made his debut on April 14, 1942. On May 5, Christopher made his first appearance as a starting pitcher against the Detroit Tigers. The Athletics won the game, 2–1, and he got his first major league win. After another win five days later, he began a long losing streak. Many of the games he did pitch were in relief, including a game in June against the Cleveland Indians where he only allowed one hit in three innings. He got his third win of the season three months after his second on August 20 in a 2–1 victory over the Washington Nationals. He finished the season with a 4–13 record, a 3.82 ERA, 30 total games, 58 strikeouts and 99 walks. The following season, Christopher re-signed with the Athletics, and was one of the few remaining pitchers from the previous year on the team, the rest having been called to serve in World War II. He began the season in the starting rotation, winning his first start of the season against the Boston Red Sox in a 5–0 shutout. Over the course of the season, he converted to a sidearm pitching delivery, which led to three victories in a row for him. After a July 9 loss to the Tigers brought his record to 4–6, Christopher did not pitch again until August 24, and spent the rest of the season pitching in relief. He finished the season with a 5–8 record and a 3.45 ERA.

Christopher began the 1944 season as a member of the starting rotation along with Don Black, Lum Harris and Bobo Newsom. However, he did split time in the first half of the year between the starting rotation and the bullpen. Among those appearances was a 16-inning match against the Chicago White Sox; Christopher pitched the final four innings, losing 4–2 after Hal Trosky stole home plate. On July 14, he pitched a 4–3 victory against the Senators, helping his team defeat Hall of Fame pitcher Early Wynn for the first time in three years. After starting the season with a 4–10 record, on July 22 Christopher went on a seven-game winning streak that culminated with a 5–1 complete game victory over the White Sox. He finished the season with a 14–14 record, 84 strikeouts and an ERA of 2.97. After the season ended, Christopher and others went on a barnstorming tour throughout the United States, ending in Wenatchee, Washington.

The following season, Christopher was part of an optimistic 1945 Athletics team, so much so that coach Earle Mack felt that Christopher, Black, Newsom and Jesse Flores were the best quartet of starting pitchers in the league. He spent most of spring training holding out for a new contract, which was eventually agreed on in the middle of March. He missed the first couple weeks of the season due to injury, and won his season debut on April 18, a 12-inning shutout against the Senators. He followed that up with a victory over the Boston Red Sox, allowing only one earned run in his first 21 innings of the season. In mid-June, Christopher had won ten games, which not only led the league, but was more than the seven the rest of the Athletics pitching staff had combined. On July 21, Christopher was part of a 24-inning game against the Tigers that ended in a 1–1 tie; he went 13 innings in the game while Joe Berry pitched the other 11. Although Christopher had a strong start to the season, he struggled during the second half. He lost seven straight games over a two-month period before winning another on August 19 against the Tigers. He finished the year with a 13–13 record and a 3.17 ERA. He was selected to the American League All-Star team, however the game was canceled as a result of World War II.

The 1946 season began with Christopher the subject of a possible trade. The Athletics tried to obtain Johnny Lindell from the Yankees, but they wanted Christopher in return. Mack refused to give him up, and as a result the trade never materialized. He began the season in the starting rotation, and was the opening day starting pitcher in a 5–0 loss against the Yankees. Over the first part of the season, Christopher again split time between the rotation and the bullpen. In a 7–3 loss to the Indians on July 18, Christopher could not get out of the second inning, allowing five earned runs. After this, he did not pitch for a month, and spent the rest of the season as an occasional reliever. He finished the season with five wins, seven losses and a 4.30 ERA. After the season ended, Christopher began contemplating retirement from baseball. He had lost 10 pounds in the final months of the season and was light to begin with, and decided that he would retire if he could not gain the weight back over the winter.

Christopher gained the weight back and rejoined the Athletics for the 1947 season. While there was talk of keeping him in the rotation, he ended up becoming a full-time reliever for the team. Despite this, Christopher was still able to contribute with his bat; he drove in the winning run in a May 29 game against the Red Sox. Over the course of the season, Christopher evolved into the Athletics' closer, finishing the games when the team's pitchers could not go the distance. He finished the season having played 44 games, finishing 38 of them and getting 12 saves in the process. He also had 10 wins, seven losses, and a 2.90 ERA. At the end of the season, Christopher was holding out on his contract, wanting either a starting role in the rotation or more money to remain a reliever. The two sides agreed to a deal at the end of February, and he looked to be a starting pitcher during the 1948 season.

== Cleveland Indians ==
While Christopher was holding out for a new deal from the Athletics, he was also trying to gain weight. He went to around 40 banquets on behalf of Connie Mack during the offseason, and despite his eating habits, he remained at 170 pounds, not gaining an ounce. After apparently reaching an agreement with the Athletics, Christopher was purchased by the Cleveland Indians on April 3, 1948. While the deal was made between Mack and Indians owner Bill Veeck, Mack said he would not have made it unless Christopher consented to it, which he did not expect to happen. Indians manager Lou Boudreau reacted positively to the trade and felt that he was the missing piece for a pennant run. He said of the trade, "With Christopher on our staff, we're definitely contenders."

While Christopher was hoping to start, the Indians felt, like the Athletics, that he would be better as a relief pitcher for them. Early in the season, Christopher told Veeck that 1948 would be his final year, as his wife joined the doctors' side, wanting him to retire and noting that he was playing on "borrowed time" already. He spent the season as the Indians' chief relief pitcher alongside Ed Klieman, both of whom were considered two of the best relievers in the league that season. Christopher finished the season with 45 games played, a 3–2 record, a 2.90 ERA, and 17 saves, which led the league. In the 1948 World Series, he pitched in game five, facing Mike McCormick and Eddie Stanky. He allowed singles to both hitters and allowed two runs to score, and was relieved by Satchel Paige, ending his only playoff appearance.

After the World Series ended, Christopher mulled over retirement, and in January 1949, he made it official. However, at the start of February, he reconsidered and signed a contract with the Indians, deciding to play for one more year. A month later, as spring training began, he decided to retire for good, ending his career in baseball.

== Later life ==
After retiring, Christopher moved to San Diego, where he lived with his wife and three children. In December 1950, Christopher underwent heart surgery, and afterward felt optimistic about the possibility of pitching again. After a tryout with the Indians in 1951, he joined the San Diego Padres for a salary of $1 a year. He spent several weeks training with the team, but was eventually released at the end of April, ending his comeback attempt.

When his final attempt at a comeback failed, Christopher went on to work in an aircraft plant in San Diego. He died in his hometown of Richmond, California, at the age of 37 on December 5, 1954, and is interred at Chapel of the Chimes in Oakland, California.

== See also ==
- List of Major League Baseball annual saves leaders
