= Nick Carter (baseball) =

American baseball player (1879-1961)

- Pitcher
- Born: May 19, 1879; Oatlands, Virginia
- Died: November 23, 1961 (aged 82); Grasonville, Maryland
- Batted: Left Threw: Right

MLB debut
- April 14, 1908, for the Philadelphia Athletics

Last MLB appearance
- June 8, 1908, for the Philadelphia Athletics

MLB statistics
- Win–loss record: 2–5
- Strikeouts: 17
- Earned run average: 2.97
- Stats at Baseball Reference

Teams
- Philadelphia Athletics (1908)

Conrad Powell "Nick" Carter (May 19, 1879 – November 23, 1961), was a professional baseball player. He played one season in Major League Baseball as a pitcher in 1908 for the Philadelphia Athletics.

== Early career ==
Carter attended the University of Virginia. Carter was drafted by Athletics' owner and manager Connie Mack in 1907 after playing minor league baseball for the Syracuse Stars of the New York State League from 1903 to 1907. He was considered the best pitcher in the league that season by New York State League team managers.

== Philadelphia Athletics ==
Carter pitched a late 1908 spring training game against the Athletics' cross-town rivals the Philadelphia Phillies and his performance was praised by the Philadelphia newspapers. Although he had never played in the majors prior to 1908, he was the Athletics' Opening Day starting pitcher on April 14, 1908, against the New York Yankees at Hilltop Park. The Athletics lost that game. For the 1908 season, and his career, he pitched in 14 games, with 5 starts and 2 complete games. He had a win–loss record of 2–5 and an earned run average of 2.97. He had 17 walks and 17 strikeouts. The Cameron County Press described Carter as "a big husky chap" who has "great speed, good curves and an excellent spitter."

== Return to the minor leagues ==
On June 8, 1908, Carter gave up 7 runs in less than 4 innings in a 10–0 loss to the St. Louis Browns. A few days later Carter was sold to the Kansas City Blues of the minor league American Association. Carter pitched in 26 games for the Blues in 1908, pitching 208 innings and posting a 10–13 won-lost record.

In 1909 he spent the entire season with the Blues, pitching in 32 games and 229 innings, posting a 15–12 record. By 1911 he was back in the New York State League, pitching for the Elmira Colonels. He had a 10–13 won-lost record in 34 games for the Colonels in 1911. In 1913, he pitched for the Newport News Shipbuilders of the Virginia League. There he posted a 12–10 won-lost record in 28 games and 216 innings.

== Personal life ==
Carter was a grandson of the American Planation owner George Carter.
