= Elbert Andrews =

American baseball player (1901-1979)

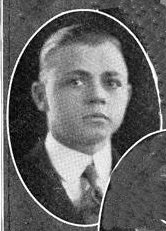
- 1921 yearbook photo
- Pitcher
- Born: December 11, 1901; Greenwood, South Carolina
- Died: November 25, 1979 (aged 77); Greenwood, South Carolina
- Batted: Left Threw: Right

MLB debut
- May 1, 1925, for the Philadelphia Athletics

Last MLB appearance
- June 12, 1925, for the Philadelphia Athletics

MLB statistics
- Earned run average: 10.13
- Innings pitched: 8
- Stats at Baseball Reference

Teams
- Philadelphia Athletics (1925)

Elbert DeVore Andrews (December 11, 1901 – November 25, 1979) was a professional baseball player whose career lasted one season, 1925, with part of it being in Major League Baseball with the Philadelphia Athletics. The other part of the season was in the minor leagues with the Double-A Baltimore Orioles of the International League. Over his career in the majors, Andrews, a pitcher, compiled no record and a 10.13 earned run average (ERA) in six games, all in relief. Andrews batted right-handed and threw left-handed.

== Professional career ==
Before signing a professional baseball contract, Andrews attended Furman University in Greenville, South Carolina from 1921 to 1923. Andrews only played one season, 1925, in the professional circuit. In the minor leagues, Andrews pitched two games with the Baltimore Orioles of the Double-A International League. As a member of the Philadelphia Athletics that season Andrews made his debut in Major League Baseball on May 1, 1925, against the Washington Senators. At the time of his debut, Andrews was the first player from Furman University to play in Major League Baseball, just ahead of Blackie Carter, who made his debut on October 3, 1925. During his time in the majors, Andrews compiled no record and a 10.13 earned run average (ERA) in six games, all in relief.

== Post-baseball career ==
Andrews later became a two-term mayor (1927–1931, 1935–1941) of his home town of Greenwood. Andrews also managed Long Motor Lines between 1938 and 1944.

== Sources ==
1. "Elbert Andrews Statistics and History". Baseball-Reference.com.
2. "Elbert Andrews Minor League Statistics & History". Baseball-Reference.com.

Inline citations
