= Tom Glass =

American baseball player

- Pitcher
- Born: April 29, 1898; Greensboro, North Carolina
- Died: December 15, 1981 (aged 83); Greensboro, North Carolina
- Batted: Right Threw: Right

MLB debut
- June 12, 1925, for the Philadelphia Athletics

Last MLB appearance
- June 15, 1925, for the Philadelphia Athletics

MLB statistics
- Win–loss record: 1-0
- Earned run average: 5.40
- Strikeouts: 2
- Stats at Baseball Reference

Teams
- Philadelphia Athletics (1925)

Thomas Joseph Glass (April 29, 1898 – December 15, 1981) was an American Major League Baseball pitcher. He played for the Philadelphia Athletics during the 1925 season.
