= Red Holt =

American baseball player (1894-1961)

- First baseman
- Born: July 25, 1894; Dayton, Tennessee, U.S.
- Died: February 2, 1961 (aged 66); Birmingham, Alabama, U.S.
- Batted: Left Threw: Left

MLB debut
- September 5, 1925, for the Philadelphia Athletics

Last MLB appearance
- October 3, 1925, for the Philadelphia Athletics

MLB statistics
- Batting average: .273
- Hits: 24
- Runs batted in: 8
- Stats at Baseball Reference

Teams
- Philadelphia Athletics (1925)

James Emmett Madison Holt (July 25, 1894 – February 2, 1961) was an American Major League Baseball infielder. He played for the Philadelphia Athletics during the 1925 season.
