= Frank McCue =

American baseball player (1898-1953)

- Third baseman
- Born: October 4, 1898; Chicago, Illinois, U.S.
- Died: July 5, 1953 (aged 54); Evergreen Park, Illinois, U.S.
- Batted: Both Threw: Right

MLB debut
- September 15, 1922, for the Philadelphia Athletics

Last MLB appearance
- September 22, 1922, for the Philadelphia Athletics

MLB statistics
- Batting average: .000
- Games played: 2
- At bats: 5
- Stats at Baseball Reference

Teams
- Philadelphia Athletics (1922)

Frank Aloysius McCue (October 4, 1898 – July 5, 1953) was an American professional baseball player. He played two games in Major League Baseball for the Philadelphia Athletics in 1922 as a third baseman.
