= Bill Knowlton =

American baseball player (1898-1944)

- Pitcher
- Born: August 18, 1898; Philadelphia, Pennsylvania, U.S.
- Died: February 25, 1944 (aged 45); Philadelphia, Pennsylvania, U.S.
- Batted: Right Threw: Right

MLB debut
- September 3, 1920, for the Philadelphia Athletics

Last MLB appearance
- September 3, 1920, for the Philadelphia Athletics

Career statistics
- Win–loss record: 0–1
- Earned run average: 4.76
- Strikeouts: 5
- Stats at Baseball Reference

Teams
- Philadelphia Athletics (1920)

William Young Knowlton (August 18, 1898 – February 25, 1944) was an American right-handed baseball pitcher.

== Early life ==
Knowlton was born in Philadelphia in 1898. According to one account, he got his start in baseball at the Baldwin Locomotive Works in Eddystone, Pennsylvania. According to another, he gained fame as a sandlot pitcher in Philadelphia and then played for Petersburg in the Virginia League.

== Career ==
=== Baseball ===
Kowlton appeared in one game in Major League Baseball. On September 3, 1920, he started a game for the Philadelphia Athletics against the Washington Senators at Shibe Park. He pitched 5-2/3 innings and allowed three earned runs in a losing effort. His career record in Major League Baseball was zero wins, one loss, five strikeouts, and a 4.76 earned run average.

Knowlton continued playing in the minor leagues for several years, including stints with the Jersey City Skeeters (1922), Crisfield Crabbers (1922), Wilkes-Barre Barons (1925–1926), Toronto Maple Leafs (1926), and Williamsport Grays (1926–1929). He also reportedly played for baseball clubs in Montreal and Decatur, Illinois.

=== Philadelphia Police Department ===
Knowlton joined the Philadelphia Police Department in 1938, serving in the 42nd District. He was married to Irene Knowlton at that time.

== Death ==
Knowlton died in Philadelphia in 1944 at age 45. He collapsed as he stepped from a trolley car of an apparent heart attack.
