= Doc Wood =

American baseball player (1900-1974)

- Shortstop
- Born: February 28, 1900; Batesville, Mississippi
- Died: November 3, 1974 (aged 74); New Orleans, Louisiana
- Batted: Right Threw: Right

MLB debut
- July 21, 1923, for the Philadelphia Athletics

Last MLB appearance
- August 4, 1923, for the Philadelphia Athletics

MLB statistics
- Games played: 3
- At bats: 3
- Hits: 1
- Stats at Baseball Reference

Teams
- Philadelphia Athletics (1923)

Charles Spencer "Doc" Wood (February 28, 1900 – November 3, 1974) was a professional baseball player. He appeared in three games in Major League Baseball for the Philadelphia Athletics in 1923 as a shortstop.
