= John Chapman (baseball) =

American baseball player (1899-1953)

- Shortstop
- Born: October 15, 1899; Centralia, Pennsylvania, U.S.
- Died: November 3, 1953 (aged 54); Philadelphia, Pennsylvania, U.S.
- Batted: Right Threw: Right

MLB debut
- June 28, 1924, for the Philadelphia Athletics

Last MLB appearance
- September 1, 1924, for the Philadelphia Athletics

MLB statistics
- Batting average: .282
- Home runs: 0
- Runs batted in: 7
- Stats at Baseball Reference

Teams
- Philadelphia Athletics (1924)

John Joseph Chapman (October 15, 1899 – November 3, 1953) was an American professional baseball player. He was a shortstop for one season (1924) with the Philadelphia Athletics. For his career, he compiled a .282 batting average in 71 at-bats, with seven runs batted in.

An alumnus of Mount St. Mary's University, he was born in Centralia, Pennsylvania and died in Philadelphia at the age of 54.
