= Doc Ozmer =

American baseball player (1901-1970)

- Pitcher
- Born: May 25, 1901; Atlanta, Georgia, U.S.
- Died: December 28, 1970 (aged 69); Atlanta, Georgia, U.S.
- Batted: Right Threw: Right

MLB debut
- May 11, 1923, for the Philadelphia Athletics

Last MLB appearance
- May 11, 1923, for the Philadelphia Athletics

MLB statistics
- Win–loss record: 0–0
- Earned run average: 4.50
- Strikeouts: 1
- Stats at Baseball Reference

Teams
- Philadelphia Athletics (1923)

Horace Robert "Doc" Ozmer (May 25, 1901 – December 28, 1970) was an American Major League Baseball pitcher who played in 1923 with the Philadelphia Athletics.
