= Chuck Wolfe (baseball) =

American baseball player (1897–1957)

- Pitcher
- Born: February 15, 1897; Wolfsburg, Pennsylvania, U.S.
- Died: November 27, 1957 (aged 60); Schellsburg, Pennsylvania, U.S.
- Batted: Left Threw: Right

MLB debut
- August 2, 1923, for the Philadelphia Athletics

Last MLB appearance
- August 19, 1923, for the Philadelphia Athletics

MLB statistics
- Win–loss record: 0-0
- Earned run average: 3.72
- Strikeouts: 1
- Stats at Baseball Reference

Teams
- Philadelphia Athletics (1923)

Charles Hunt Wolfe (February 15, 1897 – November 27, 1957) was an American professional baseball pitcher. He appeared three games in Major League Baseball in 1923 with the Philadelphia Athletics, all as a relief pitcher.
