= Chuck Rowland =

American baseball player (1899–1992)

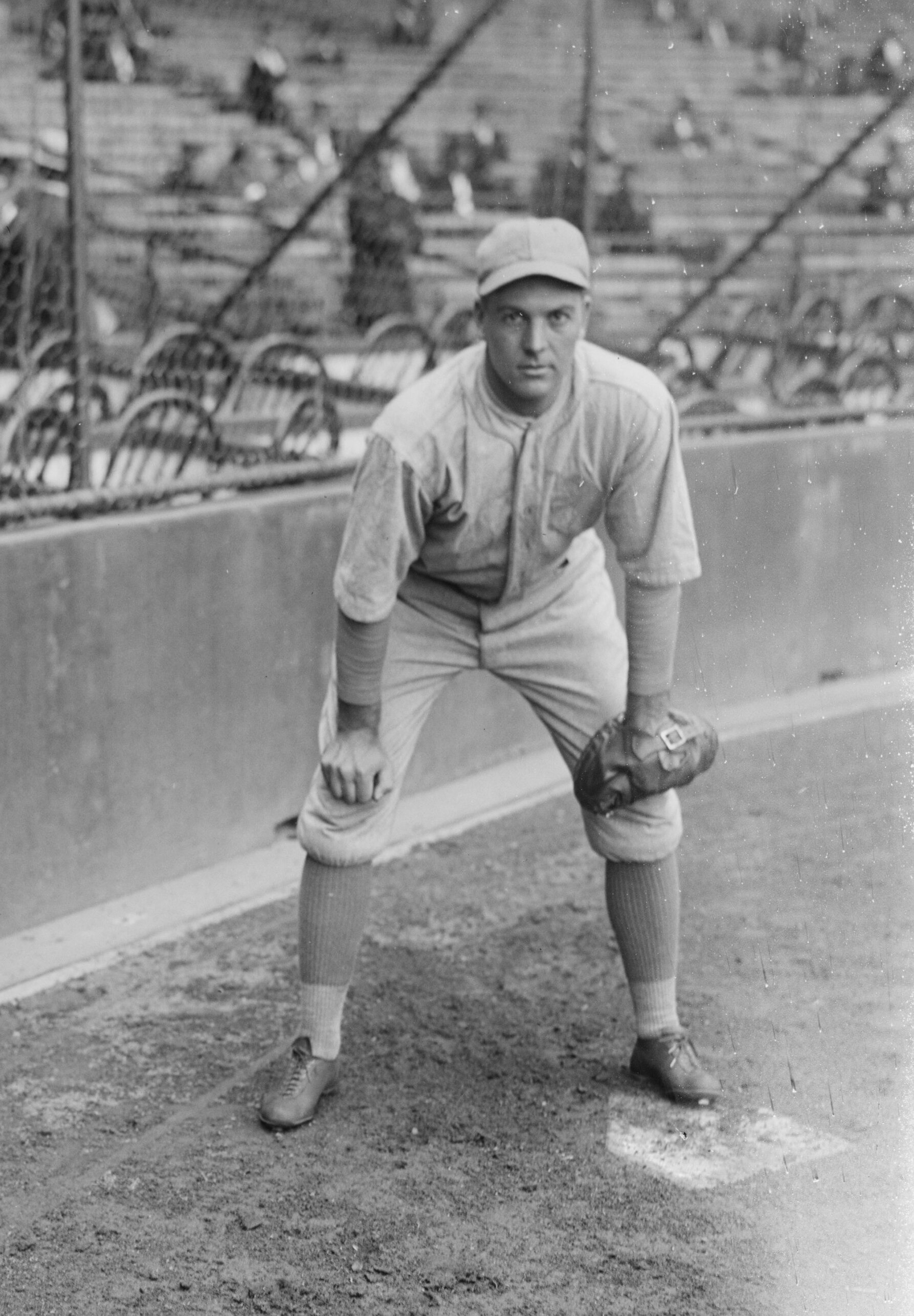
- Catcher
- Born: July 23, 1899; Warrenton, North Carolina, U.S.
- Died: January 21, 1992 (aged 92); Raleigh, North Carolina, U.S.
- Batted: Right Threw: Right

MLB debut
- May 11, 1923, for the Philadelphia Athletics

Last MLB appearance
- August 19, 1923, for the Philadelphia Athletics

MLB statistics
- Games played: 5
- At bats: 6
- Hits: 0
- Stats at Baseball Reference

Teams
- Philadelphia Athletics (1923)

Charlie Leland Rowland (July 23, 1899, Warrenton, North Carolina – January 21, 1992, Raleigh, North Carolina) was an American Major League Baseball (MLB) catcher. He played in five games for the Philadelphia Athletics during the 1923 season, four at catcher.
