= Red Schillings =

American baseball player (1900-1954)

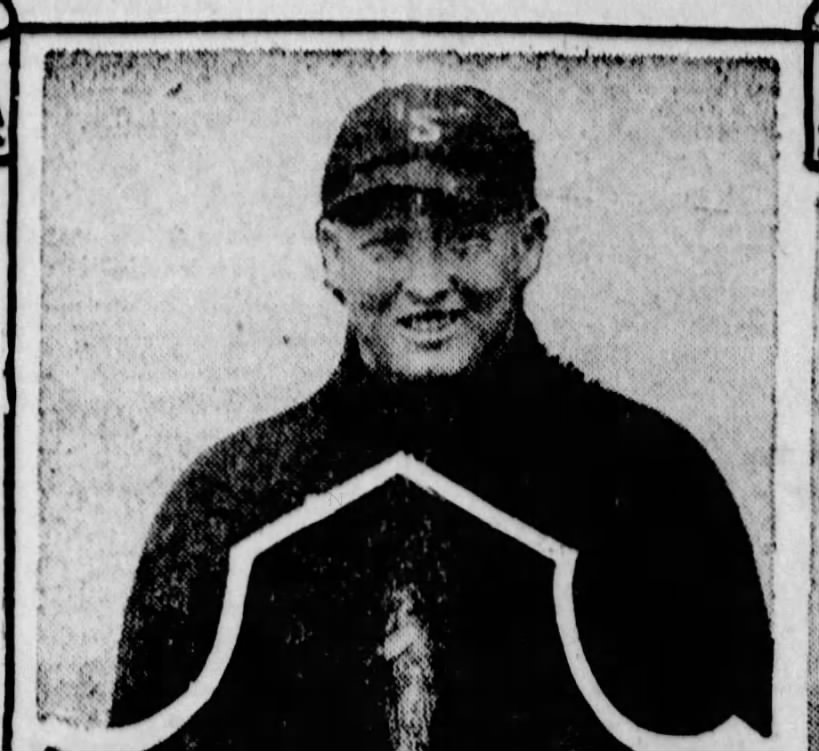
- Schillings with the Shreveport Gassers in 1924.
- Pitcher
- Born: March 29, 1900; Deport, Texas, U.S.
- Died: January 7, 1954 (aged 53); Oklahoma City, Oklahoma, U.S.
- Batted: Right Threw: Right

MLB debut
- September 11, 1922, for the Philadelphia Athletics

Last MLB appearance
- September 28, 1922, for the Philadelphia Athletics

MLB statistics
- Win–loss record: 0–0
- Earned run average: 6.75
- Strikeouts: 4
- Stats at Baseball Reference

Teams
- Philadelphia Athletics (1922)

Elbert Isaiah "Red" Schillings (March 29, 1900 – January 7, 1954) was an American Major League Baseball pitcher who made four appearances, all in relief, in 1922 with the Philadelphia Athletics. He also had a minor league career that spanned 1922 to 1928.

Schillings made his major league debut for the Philadelphia Athletics on September 11, 1922 against the New York Yankees, where he pitched 2.2 innings and allowed three hits and one earned run, which came via a home run by Babe Ruth in the eighth inning. He pitched in three more games for the Athletics that season and ended the year with a 6.75 earned run average in 8.0 innings.
