= Bill Shanner =

American baseball player (1894–1986)

- Pitcher
- Born: November 4, 1894; Oakland City, Indiana
- Died: December 18, 1986 (aged 92); Evansville, Indiana
- Batted: Left Threw: Right

MLB debut
- October 1, 1920, for the Philadelphia Athletics

Last MLB appearance
- October 1, 1920, for the Philadelphia Athletics

MLB statistics
- Games pitched: 1
- Win–loss record: 0–0
- Earned run average: 6.75

Teams
- Philadelphia Athletics (1920)

Wilfred William Shanner (November 4, 1894 – December 18, 1986) was a Major League Baseball pitcher. Shanner played for the Philadelphia Athletics in 1920. In one career game, he had a 0–0 record, going four innings, and having a 6.75 ERA. He batted left and threw right-handed.

Shanner was born in Oakland City, Indiana, and died in Evansville, Indiana.
