= Ed Sherling =

American baseball player (1897–1965)

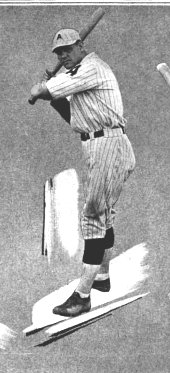
- Pinch hitter/Pinch runner
- Born: July 18, 1897; Coalburg, Alabama
- Died: November 16, 1965 (aged 68); Enterprise, Alabama
- Batted: Right Threw: Right

MLB debut
- August 13, 1924, for the Philadelphia Athletics

Last MLB appearance
- September 17, 1924, for the Philadelphia Athletics

MLB statistics
- Games: 4
- At bats: 2
- Hit: 1
- Stats at Baseball Reference

Teams
- Philadelphia Athletics (1924)

Ed Sherling
Profile
- Position: Fullback

Personal information
- Listed height: 6 ft 1 in (1.85 m)
- Listed weight: 185 lb (84 kg)

Career information
- College: Auburn (1919–1922)

Awards and highlights
- SIAA championship (1919); All-Southern (1920, 1921, 1922)

Edward Creech Sherling (July 18, 1897 – November 16, 1965) was a Major League Baseball pinch hitter and pinch runner who played in 1924 with the Philadelphia Athletics. He batted left and threw right-handed. He attended college at Auburn University playing for the baseball and the football teams.

In December 1921 a fire broke out at the Stabler Hospital in Greenville, Alabama. Sherling happened to be passing by, and saved several people by carrying them to safety. Three corpses were pulled from the ruins after the blaze.

== Auburn University ==
Sherling was a fullback on Mike Donahue's Auburn Tigers football team. He was elected All-Southern three times; and was selected to coach Donahue's all-time Auburn team.

=== 1920 ===
Sherling was a prominent member of the team in 1920, one of Auburn's greatest teams. Sherling also played on the 1921 team. He won the Porter Cup both years.

=== 1922 ===
The 1922 team upset defending Southern champions Centre and is also considered highly; considered best by Sherling himself. Walter Camp gave Sherling honorable mention on his All-America team.

== Professional baseball ==
Sherling made his Major League debut on August 13, 1924 against the Detroit Tigers. The only hit of his Major League career came as a pinch hitter for Stan Baumgartner in the fifth inning of a game at Cleveland's Dunn Field on September 13, 1924. He hit a double to left field against Sherry Smith.
