= Ed Wingo =

Canadian baseball player (1895-1964)

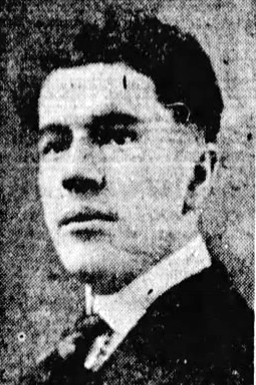
- Catcher
- Born: October 8, 1895; Ste. Anne de Bellevue, Quebec, Canada
- Died: December 5, 1964 (aged 69); Lachine, Quebec, Canada
- Batted: Right Threw: Right

MLB debut
- October 2, 1920, for the Philadelphia Athletics

Last MLB appearance
- October 2, 1920, for the Philadelphia Athletics

MLB statistics
- Batting average: .250
- Home runs: 0
- Runs batted in: 1
- Stats at Baseball Reference

Teams
- Philadelphia Athletics (1920)

Edmund Armand Wingo (October 8, 1895 – December 5, 1964) was a Canadian professional baseball player. He appeared in one game in Major League Baseball for the Philadelphia Athletics during the 1920 season as a catcher.
