= Paul Johnson (baseball) =

American baseball player (1896–1973)

- Outfielder
- Born: September 2, 1896; North Grosvenordale, Connecticut
- Died: February 14, 1973 (aged 76); McAllen, Texas
- Batted: Right Threw: Right

MLB debut
- September 13, 1920, for the Philadelphia Athletics

Last MLB appearance
- October 2, 1921, for the Philadelphia Athletics

MLB statistics
- Batting average: .276
- Home runs: 1
- Runs batted in: 15
- Stats at Baseball Reference

Teams
- Philadelphia Athletics (1920–1921)

Paul Oscar Johnson (September 2, 1896 – February 14, 1973) was an American Major League Baseball outfielder. He played for the Philadelphia Athletics during the 1920 and 1921 seasons.
