= Dick Burrus =

American baseball player (1898–1972)

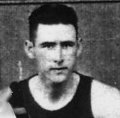
- Burrus in basketball photo from 1919 NC State College yearbook
- First baseman
- Born: January 29, 1898; Hatteras, North Carolina, U.S.
- Died: February 2, 1972 (aged 74); Elizabeth City, North Carolina, U.S.
- Batted: Left Threw: Left

MLB debut
- June 23, 1919, for the Philadelphia Athletics

Last MLB appearance
- August 21, 1928, for the Boston Braves

MLB statistics
- Batting average: .291
- Home runs: 11
- Runs batted in: 211
- Stats at Baseball Reference

Teams
- Philadelphia Athletics (1919–1920); Boston Braves (1925–1928)

Maurice Lennon "Dick" Burrus (January 29, 1898 – February 2, 1972) was a professional baseball player.

== Early years ==
Burrus was born in North Carolina's Outer Banks, where his family had lived for generations, to sea captain Dozier Burrus and Achsah Williams. When he was eleven, the family moved to Elizabeth City, North Carolina, so that he could further his education. It was at Elizabeth City High School, that Burrus was first introduced to baseball, playing pitcher and catcher for the school team. On the recommendation of one of his teachers, Burrus finished his high school education at Oak Ridge Academy, where he was eventually named to the school's All-Time Baseball Hall of Fame.

Upon his graduation from the academy, Burrus studied textile engineering at North Carolina State College. His education was partially funded by athletic scholarships, with the remainder paid from the proceeds of his summer and weekend jobs in construction and at the local ironworks and dry docks. Burrus interrupted his education for two years to join the United States Army, serving at Camp Gordon in Georgia. He later returned to NC State and lettered in three sports.

== Baseball career ==
In 1919, Burrus left college to begin his professional baseball career. He joined the minor league South Atlantic League as a first baseman for the Columbia Comers, and was paid $3000. Two months later, he was signed by Connie Mack to play for the Philadelphia Athletics. Because of inconsistent fielding, Burrus was sent to Columbus in the American Association, before being sold to Atlanta, where he helped win the Southern Association pennant.

In 1925, Burrus returned to the majors, playing for the Boston Braves. That season he batted .340 with 200 hits, 41 doubles and 87 RBIs, all career-bests. He also led all National League first basemen in fielding with a .990 percentage in 151 games.

Later that year, Burrus suffered a hernia and was never able to play at the same level. His contract was sold to the Indianapolis Indians for $10,000. He helped that team win the AA pennant. He later played for the Houston Buffaloes, and in 1930 was released for good by Atlanta.

During his best years, his salary only reached as high as $9000.

== Post-baseball ==
After his baseball career ended, Burrus returned to his native North Carolina. He served as a county commissioner, and worked as a fish buyer and Texaco distributor until his retirement in 1962. He then moved to Currituck County, North Carolina to live near a hospital.

Burrus died of lung cancer in 1972, leaving behind his widow and four children, including daughters Dixie and Mary, and nine grandchildren.

== Sources ==
- Interview with Maurice Burrus and biography
- Career statistics from Baseball Reference · Fangraphs · Retrosheet · Baseball Almanac
