= John Slappey =

American baseball player (1898-1957)

- Pitcher
- Born: August 8, 1898; Albany, Georgia
- Died: June 10, 1957 (aged 58); Marietta, Georgia
- Batted: Left Threw: Left

MLB debut
- August 23, 1920, for the Philadelphia Athletics

Last MLB appearance
- October 2, 1920, for the Philadelphia Athletics

MLB statistics
- Win–loss record: 0-1
- Earned run average: 7.11
- Strikeouts: 1
- Stats at Baseball Reference

Teams
- Philadelphia Athletics (1920)

John Henry Slappey (August 8, 1898 – June 10, 1957) was a Major League Baseball pitcher who played in 1920 with the Philadelphia Athletics.
