= Lefty Willis =

American baseball player (1905-1962)

- Pitcher
- Born: November 4, 1905; Leetown, West Virginia, U.S.
- Died: May 10, 1962 (aged 56); Bethesda, Maryland, U.S.
- Batted: Left Threw: Left

MLB debut
- October 3, 1925, for the Philadelphia Athletics

Last MLB appearance
- July 12, 1927, for the Philadelphia Athletics

MLB statistics
- Win–loss record: 3-1
- Earned run average: 3.92
- Strikeouts: 23
- Stats at Baseball Reference

Teams
- Philadelphia Athletics (1925–1927)

Charles William "Lefty" Willis (November 4, 1905 – May 10, 1962) was an American Major League Baseball pitcher who played from 1925 to 1927 with the Philadelphia Athletics.
