= Emmett McCann =

American baseball player (1902–1937)

Emmet McCann
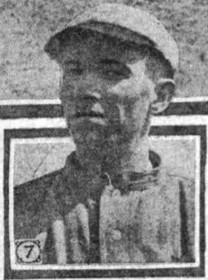
- Shortstop
- Born: March 4, 1902; Philadelphia, Pennsylvania, U.S.
- Died: April 15, 1937 (aged 35); Philadelphia, Pennsylvania, U.S.
- Batted: Right Threw: Right

MLB debut
- April 19, 1920, for the Philadelphia Athletics

Last MLB appearance
- May 23, 1926, for the Boston Red Sox

MLB statistics
- Batting average: .227
- Home runs: 0
- Runs batted in: 18
- Stats at Baseball Reference

Teams
- Philadelphia Athletics (1920–1921); Boston Red Sox (1926)

Robert Emmet McCann (March 4, 1902 – April 15, 1937) was an American professional baseball player and manager. He was shortstop in Major League Baseball who appeared in seventy-one games for the Philadelphia Athletics in 1920–1921 and Boston Red Sox in 1926.

Listed at 5 feet 11 inches (1.80 m) and 150 pounds (68 kg), McCann batted and threw right-handed.

== Biography ==
Born in Philadelphia on March 4, 1902, McCann was eighteen years old when he entered the majors in 1920 with the Athletics, thus becoming the youngest player to appear in the American League that year. In parts of three seasons with Philadelphia and Boston, he was a .227 hitter (44-for-194) with eighteen RBI in seventy-one games. In fifty-seven fielding appearances, he committed sixteen errors in two hundred and fifty-one chances for a .936 percentage.

Following his playing career, McCann managed in the American Association for the Indianapolis Indians (1931–1932) and St. Paul Saints (1933), as well as for the Little Rock Travelers of the Southern Association (1934) and Elmira Pioneers of the New York–Penn League (1935).

McCann died in his hometown of Philadelphia at the age of thirty-five from suicide by gunshot.

McCann was named for the Irish martyr Robert Emmet, thus the single "t" in his middle name, by which he was called.

== See also ==
- Boston Red Sox all-time roster
