= Johnny Berger =

American baseball player (1901-1979)

- Catcher
- Born: August 27, 1901; Philadelphia
- Died: May 7, 1979 (aged 77); Lake Charles, Louisiana
- Batted: Right Threw: Right

MLB debut
- April 20, 1922, for the Philadelphia Athletics

Last MLB appearance
- September 6, 1927, for the Washington Senators

MLB statistics
- Batting average: .313
- Home runs: 0
- Runs batted in: 1

Teams
- Philadelphia Athletics (1922); Washington Senators (1927)

Johnny Berger (August 27, 1901 – May 7, 1979) was a Major League Baseball catcher. He played with the Philadelphia Athletics in 1922 and the Washington Senators in 1927.
