= Lyle Bigbee =

American baseball player (1893–1942)

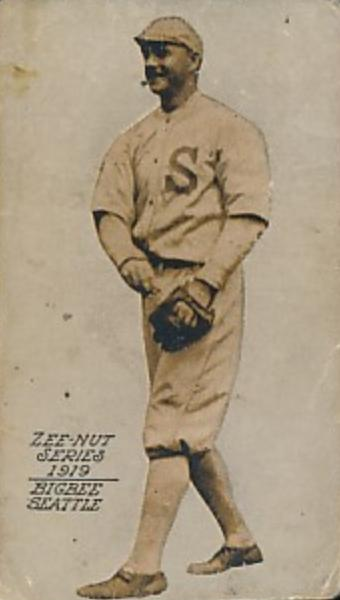
- Bigbee with the Seattle Rainiers
- Pitcher / Outfielder
- Born: August 22, 1893; Waterloo, Oregon, U.S.
- Died: August 3, 1942 (aged 48); Portland, Oregon, U.S.
- Batted: Left Threw: Right

MLB debut
- April 15, 1920, for the Philadelphia Athletics

Last MLB appearance
- September 15, 1921, for the Pittsburgh Pirates

MLB statistics
- Win–loss record: 0–3
- Earned run average: 6.96
- Strikeouts: 13
- Batting average: .182
- Home runs: 1
- Runs batted in: 8
- Stats at Baseball Reference

Teams
- Philadelphia Athletics (1920); Pittsburgh Pirates (1921)

Lyle Randolph "Al" Bigbee (August 22, 1893 – August 5, 1942) was an American outfielder and pitcher for the Philadelphia Athletics and Pittsburgh Pirates and end for the Milwaukee Badgers in 1922.

Bigbee's brother Carson spent eleven seasons with the Pirates as an outfielder and second baseman. They were teammates on the 1921 Pirates. Lyle, Carson and their brother Morris were all standout athletes at the University of Oregon.

In 1942, Bigbee committed suicide by gunshot wound to the head at a Portland rooming house.
