= Frank Bruggy =

American baseball player (1891–1959)

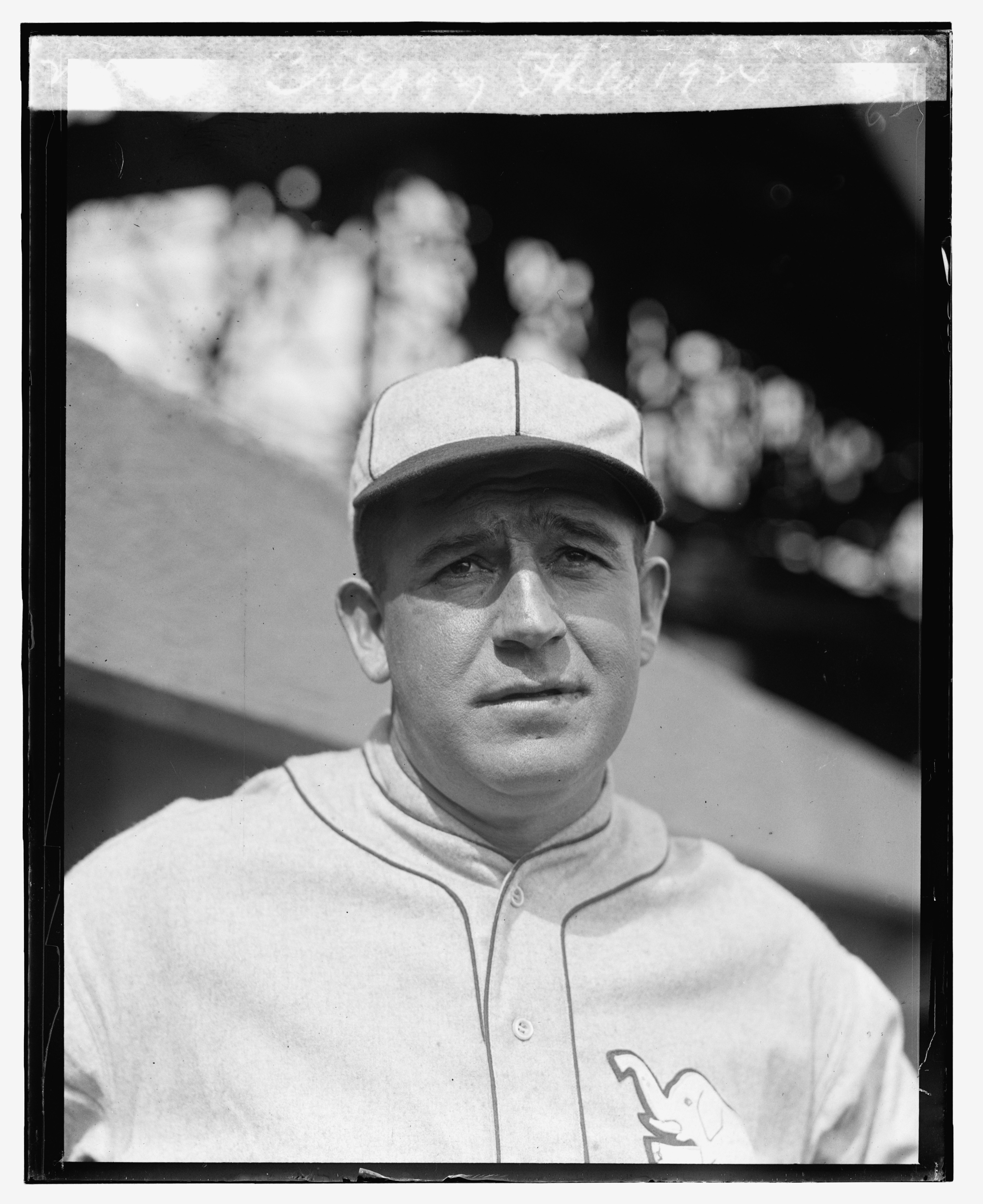
- Catcher
- Born: May 4, 1891; Elizabeth, New Jersey, U.S.
- Died: April 5, 1959 (aged 67); Elizabeth, New Jersey, U.S.
- Batted: Right Threw: Right

MLB debut
- April 13, 1921, for the Philadelphia Phillies

Last MLB appearance
- June 4, 1925, for the Cincinnati Reds

MLB statistics
- Batting average: .277
- Home runs: 6
- Runs batted in: 52
- Stats at Baseball Reference

Teams
- Philadelphia Phillies (1921); Philadelphia Athletics (1922–1924); Cincinnati Reds (1925)

Frank Leo Bruggy (May 4, 1891 – April 5, 1959) was an American professional baseball catcher. In a five-season Major League Baseball (MLB) career, he played for the Philadelphia Phillies, Philadelphia Athletics, and Cincinnati Reds. He was officially listed as standing 5 feet 11 inches (180 cm) and weighing 195 pounds (88 kg).

== Early life ==
Bruggy was born on May 4, 1891, in Elizabeth, New Jersey, and attended Thomas Jefferson High School, followed by Seton Hall University.

== Baseball career ==
=== Minor leagues ===
Bruggy played eight seasons in the minor leagues: from 1912 to 1916, and then from 1918 to 1920. He played for the Providence Grays in his first season, then moved to the Lawrence Barristers for 1913 and 1914. In 1914, he set minor-league career highs in home runs (5) and batting average (.314). He moved to the Troy Trojans for the 1915 season, and then played for two teams in 1916: the Utica Utes and the Binghamton Bingoes. After missing the 1917 season, he played for the Newark Bears of the International League in 1918 and 1919, and moved to the Buffalo Bisons in 1920 before his call-up to the majors the following season.

=== Philadelphia Phillies ===
Bruggy made his major league debut with the Philadelphia Phillies on April 13, 1921, starting at catcher in the team's opening game of the season. During the 1921 season, he set major-league career highs in batting average (.310), home runs (5), runs batted in (28), runs scored (28), and many other statistical categories, while playing in 96 games. In the field, he played 86 games at catcher, throwing out 40% of potential base-stealers, and 2 games at first base, where he made no errors in five chances. During the offseason, Bruggy was traded to the Portland Beavers of the Pacific Coast League for $6,500 ($117,327 today), and then traded back to the Philadelphia Athletics for Frank Brazill, Harvey Freeman, and Ollie Fuhrman.

=== Philadelphia Athletics ===
After joining the Athletics in 1922, Bruggy batted .279 in 53 games. He hit seven doubles and batted in nine runs in his first season with the A's, slugging .342. Continuing with the A's the following season, Bruggy's average declined to a career-low .210, hitting the last home run of his career and batting in six runs. He also played five more games at first base during the year, his last games at the position. Bruggy's final season in Philadelphia was 1924, when he batted .265 in 50 games, doubling six times, stealing four bases, and walking eight times. He became a free agent at the end of the 1924 season.

=== Cincinnati Reds ===
Bruggy signed with the Cincinnati Reds on May 8, 1925. He played in six games for the Reds, batting .214 with one run batted in. He scored two runs and had three hits in sixteen plate appearances. He played his final game for Cincinnati on June 4, 1925.

== After baseball ==
Bruggy died on April 5, 1959, in his hometown, and was buried at St. Gertrude Cemetery in Colonia, New Jersey.
