= Ollie Fuhrman =

American baseball player (1896-1969)

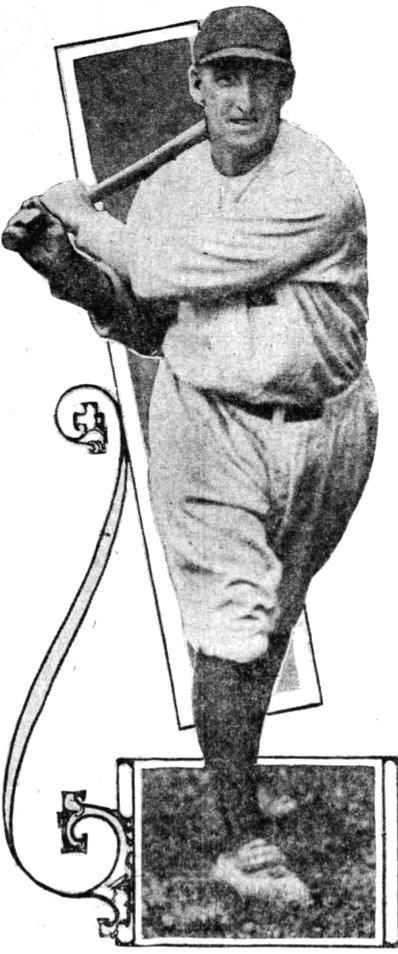
- Catcher
- Born: July 20, 1896; Jordan, Minnesota, U.S.
- Died: January 11, 1969 (aged 72); Peoria, Illinois, U.S.
- Batted: Both Threw: Right

MLB debut
- April 13, 1922, for the Philadelphia Athletics

Last MLB appearance
- May 12, 1922, for the Philadelphia Athletics

MLB statistics
- Batting average: .333
- Doubles: 1
- Stats at Baseball Reference

Teams
- Philadelphia Athletics (1922)

Alfred George Fuhrman (July 20, 1896 – January 11, 1969) was an American Major League Baseball catcher. He played for the Philadelphia Athletics during the 1922 season.
