= Paul Strand (baseball) =

American baseball player (1893-1974)

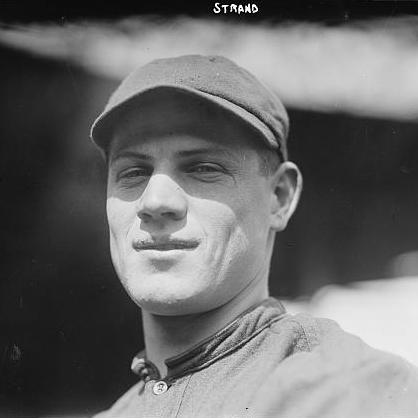
- Pitcher / Outfielder
- Born: December 19, 1893; Carbonado, Washington, U.S.
- Died: July 2, 1974 (aged 80); Salt Lake City, Utah, U.S.
- Batted: Left Threw: Left

MLB debut
- May 15, 1913, for the Boston Braves

Last MLB appearance
- June 28, 1924, for the Philadelphia Athletics

MLB statistics
- Win–loss record: 7–3
- Earned run average: 2.37
- Strikeouts: 52
- Batting average: .224
- Home runs: 0
- Runs batted in: 18
- Stats at Baseball Reference

Teams
- Boston Braves (1913–1915); Philadelphia Athletics (1924)

Career highlights and awards
- World Series champion (1914)

Paul Edward Strand (December 19, 1893 – July 2, 1974) was an American professional baseball pitcher and outfielder. He played in Major League Baseball (MLB) for the Boston Braves and Philadelphia Athletics. Strand has held the record for the most hits by one player in a professional season since he accumulated 325 for the Salt Lake City Bees of the Pacific Coast League during the 1923 season.
