= Roy Moore (baseball) =

American baseball player (1898–1951)

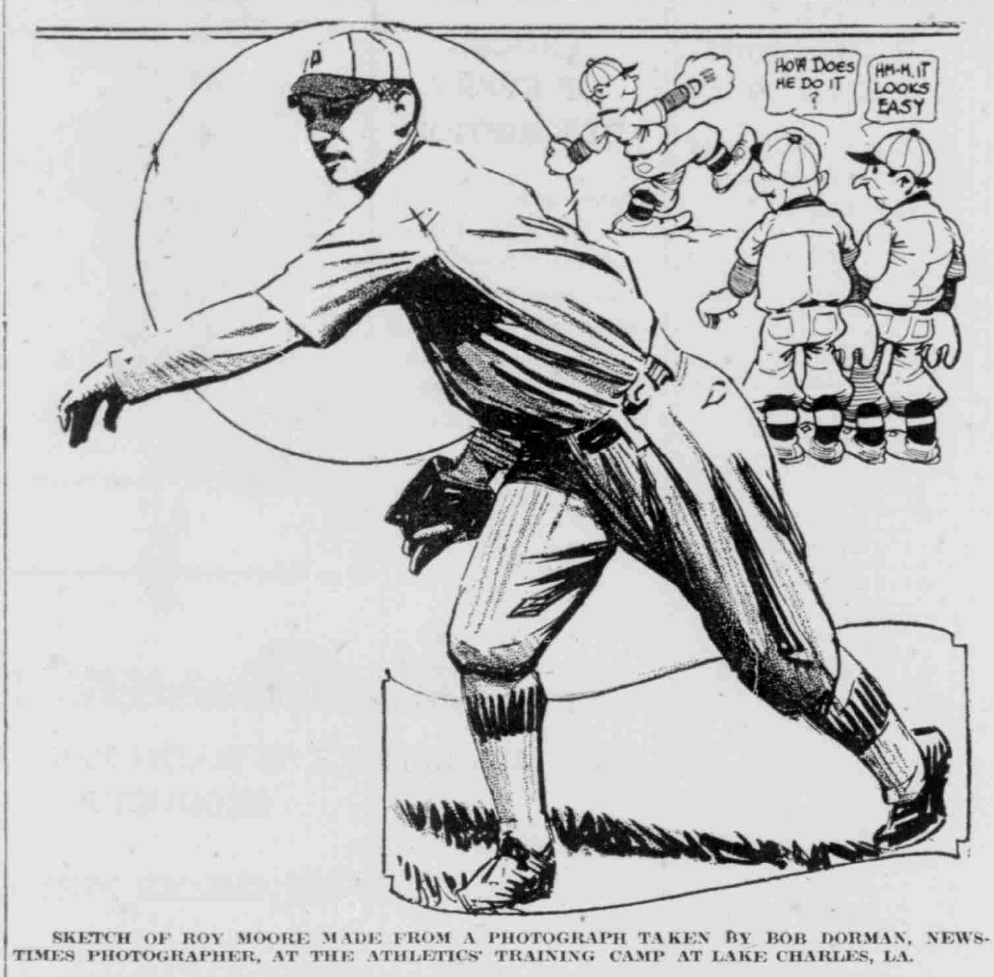
- Pitcher
- Born: October 26, 1898; Austin, Texas, U.S.
- Died: April 5, 1951 (aged 52); Seattle, Washington, U.S.
- Batted: Switch Threw: Left

MLB debut
- April 15, 1920, for the Philadelphia Athletics

Last MLB appearance
- May 8, 1923, for the Detroit Tigers

MLB statistics
- Win–loss record: 11–26
- Earned run average: 4.98
- Strikeouts: 154
- Stats at Baseball Reference

Teams
- Philadelphia Athletics (1920–1922); Detroit Tigers (1922–1923)

Roy Daniel Moore (October 26, 1898 – April 5, 1951) was an American pitcher in Major League Baseball.
