= Stan Baumgartner =

American baseball player (1894–1955)

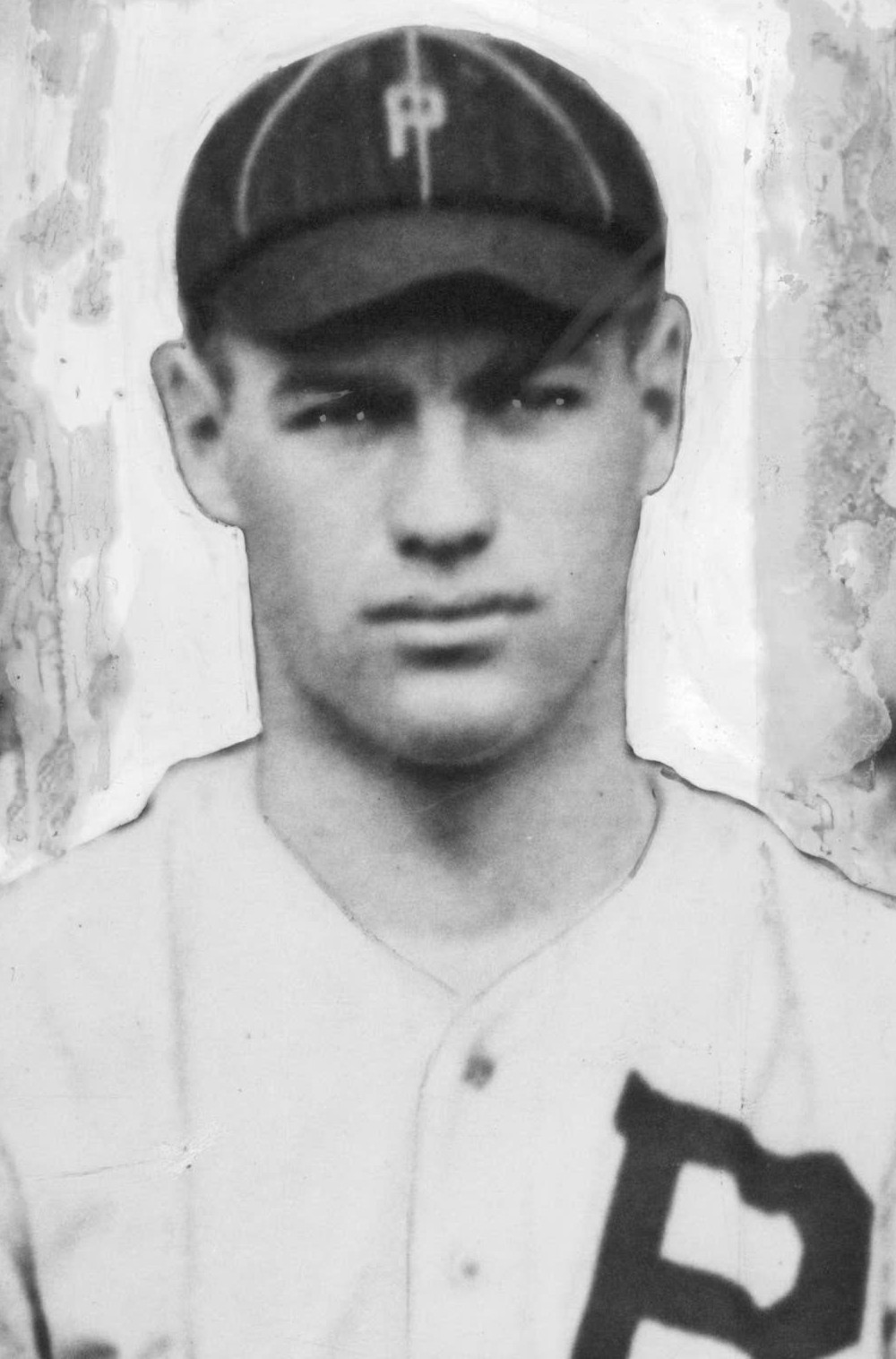
- Pitcher
- Born: December 14, 1894; Houston, Texas, U.S.
- Died: October 4, 1955 (aged 60); Philadelphia, Pennsylvania, U.S.
- Batted: Left Threw: Left

MLB debut
- June 26, 1914, for the Philadelphia Phillies

Last MLB appearance
- May 30, 1926, for the Philadelphia Athletics

MLB statistics
- Win–loss record: 26–21
- Earned run average: 3.70
- Strikeouts: 129
- Stats at Baseball Reference

Teams
- Philadelphia Phillies (1914–1916, 1921–1922); Philadelphia Athletics (1924–1926)

Stanwood Fulton Baumgartner (December 14, 1894 – October 4, 1955) was an American Major League Baseball pitcher who became a longtime sportswriter in Philadelphia, Pennsylvania. Born in Houston and raised in Chicago, Baumgartner played for the Philadelphia Phillies of the National League from 1914 to 1916 and from 1921 through early 1922. Then he played for Connie Mack's Philadelphia Athletics of the American League from 1924 to 1926. In all, he worked in 143 major league games and won 26 of 47 decisions, for a winning percentage of .553.

== Baseball career ==
A left-hander, Baumgartner was listed as 6 feet (1.8 m) tall and 175 pounds (79 kg). He played college baseball, football and basketball at the University of Chicago from 1912 to 1914. During the 1913–14 season, all three teams went on to win the Big Ten Conference title, and Baumgartner was chosen for the All-Conference teams in all three sports.

Baumgartner then signed with the Phillies and—with no prior professional baseball experience—made his major league debut on June 26, 1914, throwing one-third of an inning in relief against the Brooklyn Robins. He played in 15 games his rookie year, posting a 2–2 record and an earned run average of 3.28, along with two complete games and a shutout. The 1915 season saw Baumgartner as the Phils' main game finisher: he pitched in 16 games, finishing a team-leading 12. He did not pitch in the 1915 World Series.

Baumgartner was admitted to law school and took classes at the University of Chicago in the offseason. Following a Phillies spring training trip to Tampa in March 1916, Baumgartner remained in Tampa and took his law school exams under the proctorship of a law professor at the University of Tampa.

Baumgartner only worked in one game during the 1916 season. He then left "Organized Baseball" for four full years, and did not return to the Phillies until 1921. During that season, he appeared in 22 games, earning three wins against six losses. He pitched six games for the Phillies in 1922, none after May 30, and spent the remainder of that season and all of 1923 in minor league baseball.

In 1924, he came back to Philadelphia as a member of the Athletics, and ended up having the best season of his career. In 1924, he pitched in 36 games and started 16, hurled 12 complete games, and posted an ERA of 2.88, which was fourth best in the American League. The following season, he appeared in a career-high 37 games and compiled an ERA of 3.57. After one more season with the Athletics in 1926, mostly as a reliever, Baumgartner was sent to the Pacific Coast League, where he won 14 games. It was his last year in professional baseball. In his 143 MLB games pitched he allowed 553 hits and 185 bases on balls in 5052/3 innings. He fanned 129 and posted 18 complete games and three shutouts.

== Sportswriter ==
After his playing retirement, Baumgartner became a journalist, first covering the police beat before settling in as a sportswriter, covering all sports and specializing in baseball. He wrote for The Sporting News and The Philadelphia Inquirer until, suffering from late-stage colorectal cancer, he retired during the 1955 season. He died in Philadelphia at the age of 60 on October 4, during the 1955 World Series. He was interred at Holy Sepulchre Cemetery in Cheltenham Township, Pennsylvania.

== Coaching career ==
During World War I, and his hiatus from professional baseball, Baumgartner—although only 22 years old at the time—was also the head coach for the Delaware Fightin' Blue Hens football program for the 1917 season. He compiled a 2–5 record.

== Head coaching record ==
=== Football ===
Year	Team	Overall	Conference	Standing	Bowl/playoffs
Delaware Fightin' Blue Hens (Independent) (1917)
1917	Delaware	2–5			
Delaware:		2–5			
Total:		2–5			
