= Beauty McGowan =

American baseball player (1901-1982)

- Outfielder
- Born: November 8, 1901; Branford, Connecticut, U.S.
- Died: May 6, 1982 (aged 80); Hamden, Connecticut, U.S.
- Batted: Left Threw: Right

MLB debut
- April 12, 1922, for the Philadelphia Athletics

Last MLB appearance
- May 13, 1937, for the Boston Bees

MLB statistics
- Batting average: .262
- Home runs: 6
- Runs batted in: 108
- Stats at Baseball Reference

Teams
- Philadelphia Athletics (1922–1923); St. Louis Browns (1928–1929); Boston Bees (1937)

Frank Bernard "Beauty" McGowan (November 8, 1901 – May 6, 1982) was an American professional baseball player, an outfielder who appeared in 375 games over five seasons (1922–1923; 1928–1929; 1937) in Major League Baseball for the Philadelphia Athletics, St. Louis Browns and Boston Bees. The native of Branford, Connecticut, threw right-handed, batted left-handed, stood 5 feet 11 inches (1.80 m) and weighed 190 pounds (86 kg).

== Career ==
McGowan spent the intervening seasons as a stalwart in minor league baseball. He played all or parts of 13 seasons in the top-level International League — largely with the minor league edition of the Baltimore Orioles, but also with the Newark Bears and Buffalo Bisons — and was a member of the inaugural class (1947) of the International League Hall of Fame. McGowan was a slugger in the minors, once hitting 37 home runs for the Orioles.

== Later life ==
After retiring from the field, he became a long-time scout for the Baltimore Orioles of the American League, the former St. Louis Browns franchise. He died in Hamden, Connecticut, at age 80.
