= Heinie Scheer =

American baseball player (1900-1976)

- Second baseman
- Born: July 31, 1900; New York City
- Died: March 21, 1976 (aged 75); New Haven, Connecticut
- Batted: Right Threw: Right

MLB debut
- April 20, 1922, for the Philadelphia Athletics

Last MLB appearance
- September 26, 1923, for the Philadelphia Athletics

MLB statistics
- Batting average: .212
- Hits: 73
- Runs batted in: 33
- Stats at Baseball Reference

Teams
- Philadelphia Athletics (1922–23)

Henry William "Heinie" Scheer (July 31, 1900 – March 21, 1976) was an American second baseman in Major League Baseball. He played for the Philadelphia Athletics from 1922 to 1923.

== Biography ==
Born in The Bronx, New York City, he was Jewish. He played baseball for the Tremont Triangles, Highbridge Athletics, Bronx Giants, Brooklyn Bushwicks, and Bay Parkways. He began his professional baseball career in 1921 playing for the Hartford Senators in the Eastern League. In his first year of professional baseball, Scheer impressed observers by playing error free baseball for the first 23 games of the season. He accepted 124 chances without making an error in April and May 1921. In September 1921, Scheer was sold by the Senators to the Philadelphia Athletics for $5,000.

Scheer developed a reputation as an exceptional defensive player, but he was weak as a batter. In March 1922, he was given a shot with the Philadelphia Athletics. The Hartford Courant wrote at the teim: "If 'Heinie' Scheer can come through with the old wallop against big league pitching he will be one of the sensations of baseballdom."

Scheer appeared in 51 games and compiled a .170 batting average for the 1922 Athletics team that finished in seventh place in the American League with a record of 65–89.

Scheer returned to the Athletics in 1923. He appeared in 69 games and raising his batting average by 63 points from .170 in 1922 to .238 in 1923. In June 1923, one reporter noted Scheer's improvement as a batter: "The player was a frail lad and shy on hitting, but the youngster is getting some power behind his blows now." In two seasons of Major League Baseball, Scheer appeared in 120 games, including 91 as a second baseman. He had a career batting average of .212, with 6 home runs and 33 runs batted in.

On December 14, 1923, Scheer was traded by the Athletics with another player and $40,000 in cash to the Milwaukee franchise in the American Association for Hall of Fame outfielder Al Simmons. The next year, Simmons became a starter for the Athletics and went on to become one of the most feared hitters in baseball for the next 20 years. Scheer did not play another game in the major leagues.

Scheer split the 1924 season between Milwaukee and Shreveport in the Texas League.

In December 1924, Scheer was sold by Milwaukee to the Reading Keystones of the International League. In 1925, Scheer was teammates with Moe Berg in Reading. Berg played shortstop at the time, giving the Reading team an all Jewish double play combination with Berg at shortstop and Scheer at second base. The pair set an International League record that year for double plays. In 2003, one writer noted that Berg and Scheer "may be the only documented Jewish double play combination in the history of professional baseball."

In the six years from 1924 to 1929, Scheer played for at least 10 minor league teams, including stints in Wilkes-Barre (1925), Reading (1925), Baltimore (1926), Terre Haute (1927), New Haven (1928), Hartford (1929), Allentown (1929), and St. Thomas, Ontario (1929).

Scheer retired from baseball after the 1929 season. He was married to Ada (Caldwell) Scheer, and they lived in New Haven, Connecticut. Over the years, Scheer had jobs as a haberdashery salesman and as a liquor salesman for wholesalers Eastern Liquor and Eder Brothers. He remained with Eder Brothers until his retirement at age 65.

Scheer was one of the founders of New Haven Little League Baseball and served as the league's commissioner for a time. He also served as an umpire for Ivy League baseball games.

In March 1976, Scheer died of a heart attack at age 75 in New Haven.

"Heinie" was a popular nickname for German baseball players in the early part of the 20th century. Scheer was one of 22 major league Heinies in the first half of the century. Others included: Heinie Beckendorf, 1909–10; Heinie Berger, 1907–10; Heinie Elder, 1913; Heinie Groh, 1912–27; Heinie Heitmuller, 1909–10; Heinie Heltzel, 1943–44; Heinie Jantzen, 1912; Heinie Kappel, 1887–89; Heinie Manush, 1923–39 – the only Hall of Fame "Heinie"; Heinie Meine, 1922–34; Heinie Mueller, 1920–35; Heinie Mueller, 1938–41; Heinie Odom, 1925; Heinie Peitz, 1892–1913; Heinie Reitz, 1893–99; Heinie Sand, 1923–28; Heinie Schuble, 1927–36; Heinie Smith, 1897–1903; Heinie Stafford, 1916; Heinie Wagner, 1902–18; and Heinie Zimmerman, 1907–19. There have been no players nicknamed Heinie in the major leagues since World War II.
