= Harry O'Neill (pitcher) =

Canadian baseball player (1892-1969)

- Pitcher
- Born: November 20, 1892; Lindsay, Ontario, Canada
- Died: September 5, 1969 (aged 76); Ridgetown, Ontario, Canada
- Batted: Right Threw: Right

MLB debut
- September 15, 1922, for the Philadelphia Athletics

Last MLB appearance
- May 28, 1923, for the Philadelphia Athletics

MLB statistics
- Win–loss record: 0–0
- Strikeouts: 2
- Earned run average: 1.80
- Stats at Baseball Reference

Teams
- Philadelphia Athletics (1922–1923)

Joseph Henry O'Neill (November 20, 1892 – September 5, 1969) was a Canadian Major League Baseball pitcher. He pitched in four games for the Philadelphia Athletics over two seasons, one in 1922 and three in 1923.

After his playing career ended, O'Neill spent two seasons as a minor league baseball manager. He managed the Salt Lake City Bees in 1927 and the Boise Senators in 1928.

== Sources ==
- Career statistics from Baseball Reference · Baseball Reference (Minors) · Retrosheet · Baseball Almanac
