= Rollie Naylor =

American baseball player (1892-1966)

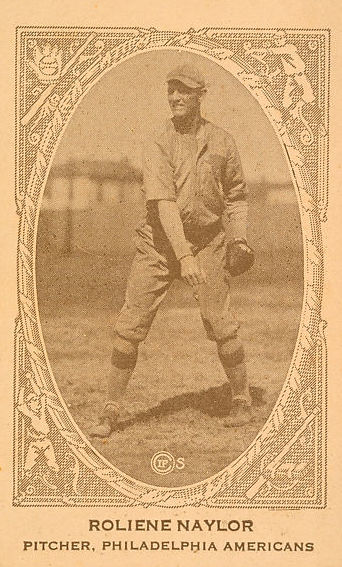
- Pitcher
- Born: February 4, 1892; Krum, Texas, U.S.
- Died: June 18, 1966 (aged 74); Fort Worth, Texas, U.S.
- Batted: Right Threw: Right

MLB debut
- September 14, 1917, for the Philadelphia Athletics

Last MLB appearance
- June 25, 1924, for the Philadelphia Athletics

MLB statistics
- Win–loss record: 42–83
- Earned run average: 3.93
- Strikeouts: 282
- Stats at Baseball Reference

Teams
- Philadelphia Athletics (1917, 1919–1924)

Roleine Cecil "Rollie" Naylor (February 4, 1892 – June 18, 1966) was an American professional baseball player who pitched in the major leagues from 1917 until 1924. He played for the Philadelphia Athletics.

Naylor was plagued by injuries during his tenure with the Athletics and was ultimately sent to Toledo during the 1924 season along with Paul Strand.
