= Fred Heimach =

American baseball player (1901–1973)

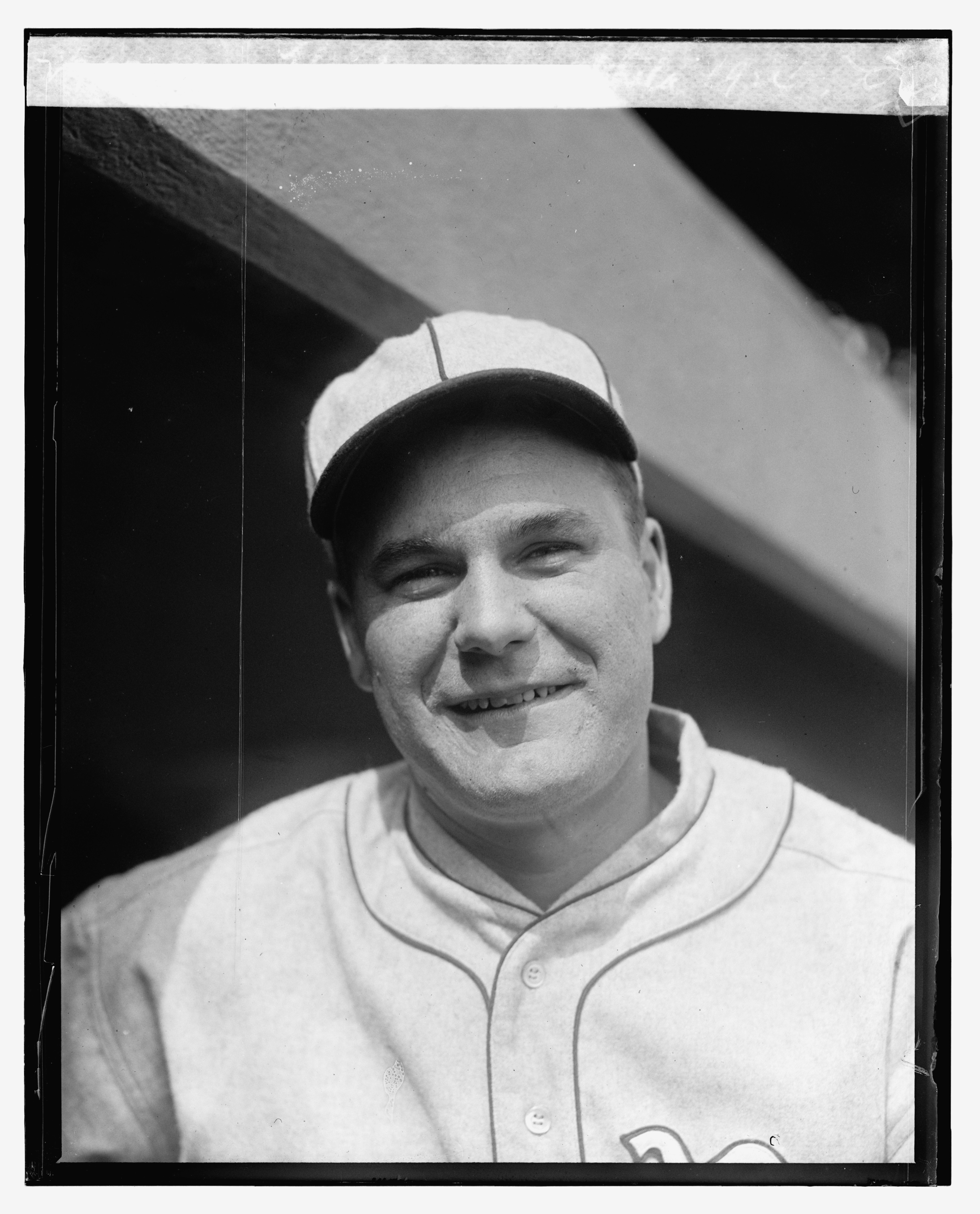
- Pitcher
- Born: January 27, 1901; Camden, New Jersey, U.S.
- Died: June 1, 1973 (aged 72); Fort Myers, Florida, U.S.
- Batted: Left Threw: Left

MLB debut
- October 1, 1920, for the Philadelphia Athletics

Last MLB appearance
- August 30, 1933, for the Brooklyn Dodgers

MLB statistics
- Win–loss record: 62–69
- Earned run average: 4.46
- Strikeouts: 334
- Stats at Baseball Reference

Teams
- Philadelphia Athletics (1920–1926); Boston Red Sox (1926); New York Yankees (1928–1929); Brooklyn Robins / Dodgers (1930–1933)

Career highlights and awards
- World Series champion (1928)

Frederick Amos Heimach (January 27, 1901 – June 1, 1973) was an American Major League Baseball pitcher for the Philadelphia Athletics (1920–1926), Boston Red Sox (1926), New York Yankees (1928–1929) and Brooklyn Robins / Brooklyn Dodgers (1930–1933). He helped the Yankees win the 1928 World Series.

In 13 seasons, he had a 62–69 win–loss record, 296 games, 127 games started, 56 complete games, 5 shutouts, 104 games finished, 7 saves, 1,288 2/3 innings pitched, 1,510 hits allowed, 755 runs allowed, 639 earned runs allowed, 64 home runs allowed, 360 walks allowed, 334 strikeouts, 27 hit batsmen, 14 wild pitches, 5,674 batters faced, 4 balks and a 4.46 ERA.

He was a very good hitting pitcher. He compiled a .236 batting average (128-for-542) with 58 runs, 3 home runs and 50 RBIs. As a member of the Philadelphia Athletics, in 1923 he batted .254 (30-for-118) with 11 RBI, he also played 6 games at first base and batted .322 in 1924 (29-for-90) with 12 RBI.

He recorded a .972 fielding percentage in his 13 year major league career. After committing two errors in the third inning on September 22, 1926 pitching for the Athletics against the Cleveland Indians at League Park, he went the next 134 appearances and handling 172 total chances (24 putouts, 148 assists) to the end of his career in 1933 without another miscue.

Heimach served as an officer for the Miami Beach Police Department for 20 years until retiring 1956. He died in Fort Myers, Florida after moving back east from Arizona in 1966 at the age of 72.
