= Bob Hasty =

American baseball player (1896-1972)

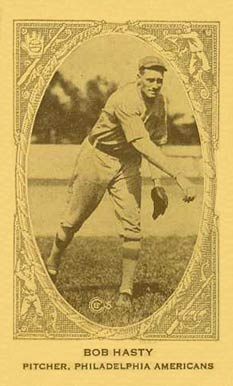
- Pitcher
- Born: May 3, 1896; Canton, Georgia, U.S.
- Died: May 28, 1972 (aged 76); Dallas, Georgia, U.S.
- Batted: Right Threw: Right

MLB debut
- September 11, 1919, for the Philadelphia Athletics

Last MLB appearance
- May 28, 1924, for the Philadelphia Athletics

MLB statistics
- Win–loss record: 29–53
- Earned run average: 4.65
- Strikeouts: 167
- Stats at Baseball Reference

Teams
- Philadelphia Athletics (1919–1924)

Robert Keller Hasty (May 3, 1896 – May 28, 1972) was an American professional baseball pitcher in the Major Leagues from 1919 to 1924. Hasty played for the Philadelphia Athletics for all six of his major league seasons. In 1921, Hasty led all American League pitchers in fewest walks per 9 innings pitched, among qualified pitchers.
