= 1914 Philadelphia Athletics season =

Major League Baseball season

1914 Philadelphia Athletics
- American League champions
- League: American League
- Ballpark: Shibe Park
- City: Philadelphia
- Record: 99–53 (.651)
- League place: 1st
- Owners: Connie Mack, Benjamin Shibe, Tom Shibe and John Shibe
- Managers: Connie Mack

The 1914 Philadelphia Athletics season was a season in American baseball. It involved the A's finishing first in the American League with a record of 99 wins and 53 losses.

The team went on to face the Boston Braves in the 1914 World Series, which they lost in four straight games.

After the season, Connie Mack sold the contracts of his best players to other teams due to his frustration with the Federal League. The A's subsequently posted seven consecutive last-place finishes in the American League and did not win another pennant until 1929.

== Regular season ==
The franchise took a downturn in 1914. The heavily favored Athletics lost the 1914 World Series to the "Miracle" Boston Braves in a four-game sweep. Miracles often have two sides, and for a few years this "miracle" wrought disaster on the A's. Mack traded, sold or released most of the team's star players soon after, and the team fell into a lengthy slump.

=== Season standings ===
American League
Team	W	L	Pct.	GB	Home	Road
Philadelphia Athletics	99	53	.651	—	51‍–‍24	48‍–‍29
Boston Red Sox	91	62	.595	8½	44‍–‍31	47‍–‍31
Washington Senators	81	73	.526	19	40‍–‍33	41‍–‍40
Detroit Tigers	80	73	.523	19½	42‍–‍35	38‍–‍38
St. Louis Browns	71	82	.464	28½	42‍–‍36	29‍–‍46
Chicago White Sox	70	84	.455	30	43‍–‍37	27‍–‍47
New York Yankees	70	84	.455	30	36‍–‍40	34‍–‍44
Cleveland Naps	51	102	.333	48½	32‍–‍47	19‍–‍55

=== Record vs. opponents ===
1914 American League record Sources:
Team	BOS	CWS	CLE	DET	NYH	PHA	SLB	WSH
Boston	—	13–9	16–6	15–7–1	11–11	12–9–3	13–9–2	11–11
Chicago	9–13	—	13–9	6–16	12–10–1	5–17	13–9–1	12–10–1
Cleveland	6–16	9–13	—	6–16	8–14–1	3–19	8–13–2	11–11–1
Detroit	7–15–1	16–6	16–6	—	13–9–1	9–12–1	9–13	10–12–1
New York	11–11	10–12–1	14–8–1	9–13–1	—	8–14	11–11	7–15
Philadelphia	9–12–3	17–5	19–3	12–9–1	14–8	—	15–7–1	13–9–1
St. Louis	9–13–2	9–13–1	13–8–2	13–9	11–11	7–15–1	—	9–13
Washington	11–11	10–12–1	11–11–1	12–10–1	15–7	9–13–1	13–9	—

=== Roster ===
1914 Philadelphia Athletics
Roster
Pitchers: Chief Bender; Charlie Boardman; Rube Bressler; Boardwalk Brown; Joe Bush; Jack Coombs; Byron Houck; Willie Jensen; Herb Pennock; Eddie Plank; Bob Shawkey; Fred Worden; Weldon Wyckoff	Catchers: Jack Lapp; Wickey McAvoy; Wally Schang; Dean Sturgis; Ira Thomas; Infielders: Frank Baker; Jack Barry; Eddie Collins; Toots Coyne; Sam Crane; Press Cruthers; Harry Davis; Larry Kopf; Earle Mack; Stuffy McInnis; Ferdie Moore; Billy Orr; Ben Rochefort	Outfielders: Tom Daley; Chick Davies; Eddie Murphy; Rube Oldring; Amos Strunk; Buck Sweeney; Shag Thompson; Jimmy Walsh	Manager: Connie Mack

== Player stats ==
=== Batting ===
==== Starters by position ====
Note: Pos = Position; G = Games played; AB = At bats; H = Hits; Avg. = Batting average; HR = Home runs; RBI = Runs batted in

Pos	Player	G	AB	H	Avg.	HR	RBI
C	Wally Schang	107	307	88	.287	3	45
1B	Stuffy McInnis	149	576	181	.314	1	95
2B	Eddie Collins	152	526	181	.344	2	85
SS	Jack Barry	140	467	113	.242	0	42
3B	Frank Baker	150	570	182	.319	9	89
OF	Rube Oldring	119	466	129	.277	3	49
OF	Amos Strunk	122	404	111	.275	2	45
OF	Eddie Murphy	148	573	156	.272	3	43

==== Other batters ====
Note: G = Games played; AB = At bats; H = Hits; Avg. = Batting average; HR = Home runs; RBI = Runs batted in

Player	G	AB	H	Avg.	HR	RBI
Jimmy Walsh	68	216	51	.236	3	36
Jack Lapp	69	199	46	.231	0	19
Tom Daley	28	86	22	.256	0	7
Larry Kopf	37	69	13	.188	0	12
Chick Davies	19	46	11	.239	0	5
Shag Thompson	16	29	5	.172	0	2
Billy Orr	10	24	4	.167	0	1
Wickey McAvoy	8	16	2	.125	0	0
Press Cruthers	4	15	3	.200	0	0
Jack Coombs	5	11	3	.273	0	2
Earle Mack	2	8	0	.000	0	1
Harry Davis	5	7	3	.429	0	2
Sam Crane	2	6	0	.000	0	0
Dean Sturgis	4	4	1	.250	0	0
Ferdie Moore	2	4	2	.500	0	1
Ira Thomas	2	3	0	.000	0	0
Toots Coyne	1	2	0	.000	0	0
Ben Rochefort	1	2	1	.500	0	0
Buck Sweeney	1	1	0	.000	0	0

=== Pitching ===
==== Starting pitchers ====
Note: G = Games pitched; IP = Innings pitched; W = Wins; L = Losses; ERA = Earned run average; SO = Strikeouts

Player	G	IP	W	L	ERA	SO
Bob Shawkey	38	237.0	15	8	2.73	89
Eddie Plank	34	185.1	15	7	2.87	110
Weldon Wyckoff	32	185.0	11	7	3.02	86
Chief Bender	28	179.0	17	3	2.26	107
Byron Houck	3	11.0	0	0	3.27	4
Willie Jensen	1	9.0	0	1	2.00	1
Chick Davies	1	9.0	1	0	1.00	4
Jack Coombs	2	8.0	0	1	4.50	1

==== Other pitchers ====
Note: G = Games pitched; IP = Innings pitched; W = Wins; L = Losses; ERA = Earned run average; SO = Strikeouts

Player	G	IP	W	L	ERA	SO
Joe Bush	38	206.0	16	12	3.06	109
Herb Pennock	28	151.2	11	4	2.79	90
Rube Bressler	29	147.2	10	4	1.77	96
Boardwalk Brown	15	66.0	1	5	4.09	20

==== Relief pitchers ====
Note: G = Games pitched; W = Wins; L = Losses; SV = Saves; ERA = Earned run average; SO = Strikeouts

Player	G	W	L	SV	ERA	SO
Charlie Boardman	2	0	0	0	4.91	2
Fred Worden	1	0	0	0	18.00	1

== 1914 World Series ==
Boston Braves (4) vs Philadelphia Athletics (0)

Game	Score	Date	Location	Attendance
1	Braves – 7, Athletics – 1	October 9	Shibe Park	20,562
2	Braves – 1, Athletics – 0	October 10	Shibe Park	20,562
3	Athletics – 4, Braves – 5 (12 innings)	October 12	Fenway Park	35,520
4	Athletics – 1, Braves – 3	October 13	Fenway Park	34,365
