= Stanford Cardinal baseball =

Baseball team

- 2026 Stanford Cardinal baseball team
- Founded: 1892; 134 years ago
- University: Stanford University
- Athletic director: John Donahoe
- Head coach: David Esquer (9th season)
- Conference: ACC
- Location: Stanford, California
- Home stadium: Klein Field at Sunken Diamond (capacity: 4,000)
- Nickname: Cardinal
- Colors: Cardinal and white

College World Series champions
- 1987, 1988

College World Series runner-up
- 2000, 2001, 2003

College World Series appearances
- 1953, 1967, 1982, 1983, 1985, 1987, 1988, 1990, 1995, 1997, 1999, 2000, 2001, 2002, 2003, 2008, 2021, 2022, 2023

NCAA regional champions
- 1982, 1983, 1985, 1987, 1988, 1990, 1995, 1997, 1999, 2000, 2001, 2002, 2003, 2006, 2008, 2011, 2012, 2014, 2019, 2021, 2022, 2023

NCAA tournament appearances
- 1953, 1965, 1967, 1981, 1982, 1983, 1984, 1985, 1986, 1987, 1988, 1990, 1991, 1992, 1994, 1995, 1996, 1997, 1998, 1999, 2000, 2001, 2002, 2003, 2004, 2005, 2006, 2008, 2011, 2012, 2014, 2017, 2018, 2019, 2021, 2022, 2023

Conference tournament champions
- 2022

Conference regular season champions
- 1924, 1925, 1927, 1931, 1950, 1953, 1966, 1967, 1983, 1984, 1985, 1987, 1990, 1994, 1997, 1998, 1999, 2000, 2003, 2004, 2018, 2022, 2023

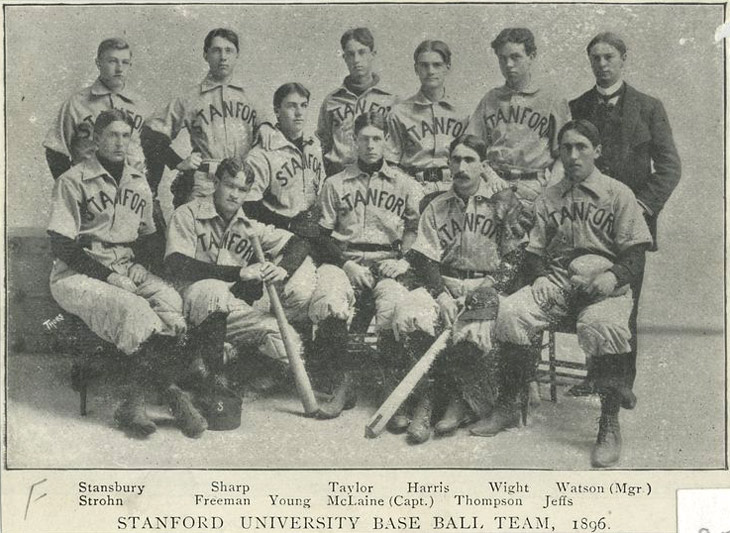
The Cardinal baseball team of 1896

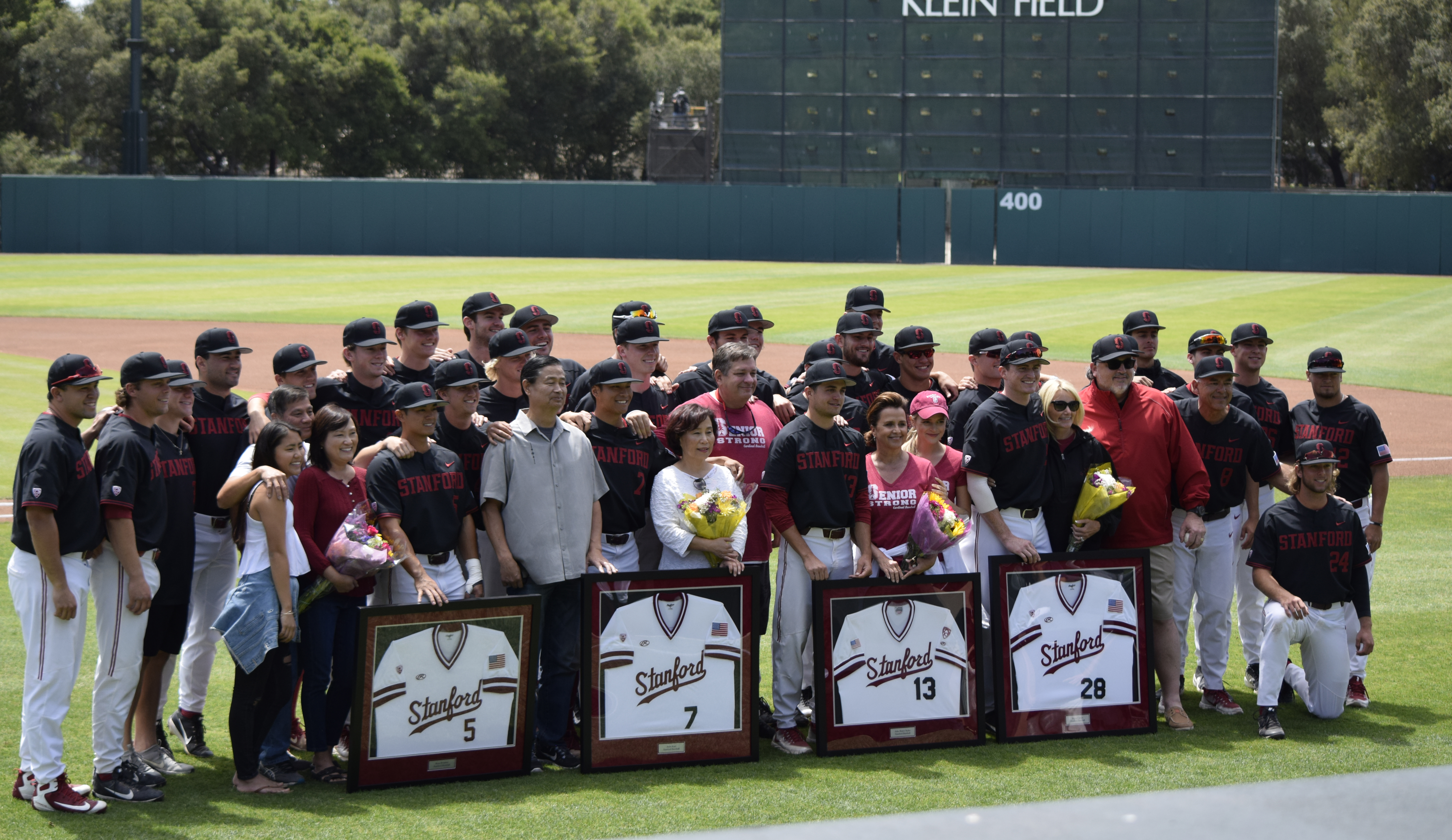
The Cardinal baseball team of 2018

The Stanford Cardinal baseball team represents Stanford University in NCAA Division I college baseball. Along with most other Stanford athletic teams, the baseball team participates in the Atlantic Coast Conference. The Cardinal play their home games on campus at Klein Field at Sunken Diamond, and they are currently coached by David Esquer.

== Head coaches ==
Name	Years	Won	Lost	Tied	Pct.
No Coach	1892–1896, 1918	30	12	0	.714
Bill_Lange	1897	3	3	0	.500
J. F. Sheehan, Jr.	1898–1899	2	3	2	.429
Dr. W. H. Murphy	1900–1901	12	13	0	.480
C. J. Swindells	1902–1903	13	20	0	.394
C. Doyle	1904	8	8	0	.500
D. V. Cowden	1905	7	10	0	.412
James F. Lanagan	1906–1907	19	19	2	.500
George J. Presley	1908–1910	30	35	0	.462
Carl F. Ganong	1911	5	11	1	.324
Jerome D. Peters	1912–1913	27	17	1	.611
W. B. Moskiman	1914	12	6	3	.643
William Orr	1915	10	10	0	.500
Harry Wolter	1916, 1923–1943, 1946–1949	277	318	7	.466
R. T. Wilson	1917	10	12	0	.455
Bob Evans	1919–1920	16	13	0	.552
W. D. Seay	1921–1922	11	17	0	.393
Everett Dean	1950–1955	125	83	4	.599
Dutch Fehring	1956–1967	290	162	4	.640
Ray Young	1968–1976	326	161	3	.668
Mark Marquess	1977–2017	1,627	878	7	.649
David Esquer	2018–present	248	125	0	.665

== Year-by-year record ==
Record table
Season	Coach	Overall	Conference	Standing	Postseason
No Coach (N/A) (1892–1896)
1892	No Coach	3–4	–	–	
1893	No Coach	11–1	–	–	
1894	No Coach	6–0	–	–	
1895	No Coach	4–1	–	–	
1896	No Coach	5–3	–	–	
No Coach:		29-9			
W. A. Lange (N/A) (1897–1897)
1896	W. A. Lange	3–3	–	–	
Lange:		3-3			
J. F. Sheehan, Jr. (N/A) (1898–1899)
1898	Sheehan, Jr.	2–1	–	–	
1899	Sheehan, Jr.	0-2-2	–	–	
Sheehan, Jr.:		2-3-2			
Dr. W. H. Murphy (N/A) (1900–1901)
1900	Murphy	3–9	–	–	
1901	Murphy	9–4	–	–	
Murphy:		12-13			
C. J. Swindells (N/A) (1902–1903)
1902	Swindells	8–9	–	–	
1903	Swindells	5–11	–	–	
Swindells:		13-20			
C. Doyle (N/A) (1904–1904)
1904	Doyle	8–8	–	–	
Doyle:		8-8			
D. V. Cowden (N/A) (1905–1905)
1905	Cowden	7–10	–	–	
Cowden:		7-10			
James F. Lanagan (N/A) (1906–1907)
1905	Lanagan	10–9	–	–	
1905	Lanagan	9-10-2	–	–	
Lanagan:		19-19-2			
George J. Presley (N/A) (1908–1910)
1908	Presley	13–13	–	–	
1909	Presley	8–8	–	–	
1910	Presley	9–14	–	–	
Presley:		30-35			
Carl F. Ganong (N/A) (1911–1911)
1911	Ganong	5-11-1	–	–	
Ganong:		5-11-1			
Jerome D. Peters (N/A) (1912–1913)
1912	Peters	12–12	–	–	
1913	Peters	15-5-1	–	–	
Peters:		27-17-1			
W. B. Oskiman (N/A) (1914–1914)
1914	Oskiman	12-6-3	–	–	
Oskiman:		12-6-3			
William Orr (N/A) (1915–1915)
1915	Orr	10–10	–	–	
Orr:		10-10			
Harry Wolter () (1916–1916)
1916	Harry Wolter	12-14-2	–	–	
Wolter:		12-14-2			
R. T. Wilson () (1917–1917)
1917	Wilson	10–12	–	–	
Wilson:		10-12			
No Coach (PCC) (1918–1918)
1917	Wilson	1–3	1–2	3rd	
No Coach:		1-3			
Bob Evans (PCC) (1919–1920)
1919	Evans	6–2	2–0	2nd	
1920	Evans	10–11	5–5	4th	
Evans:		16-13			
W. D. Seay (PCC) (1921–1922)
1921	Seay	7–9	0–3	6th	
1922	Seay	4–8	1–2	6th	
Evans:		16-13			
Harry Wolter (CIBA) (1923–1949)
1923	Wolter	11–11	2–3	2nd	
1924	Wolter	14–10	3–3	1st-t	
1925	Wolter	7–10	2–1	1st	
1926	Wolter	5–10	2–4	3rd	
1927	Wolter	8–13	5–7	3rd-t	
1928	Wolter	7–10	5–7	3rd-t	
1929	Wolter	10–11	4–10	5th	
1930	Wolter	10–12	7–8	3rd-t	
1931	Wolter	18–5	15–3	1st	
1932	Wolter	12–11	9–9	-4th-t	
1933	Wolter	8–19	4–5	2nd	
1934	Wolter	8-14-2	5–10	3rd	
1935	Wolter	2–13	2–13	6th	
1936	Wolter	8–20	2–13	6th	
1937	Wolter	13–10	8–7	3rd	
1938	Wolter	10–13	5–10	5th	
1939	Wolter	14–11	8–7	4th	
1940	Wolter	8-14-1	4–11	6th	
1941	Wolter	12–13	5–10	5th	
1942	Wolter	10-13-1	2–12	6th	
1943	Wolter	10–12	5–7	3rd	
1944	No team (WWII)	-	-	-	
1945	No team (WWII)	-	-	-	
1946	Wolter	8–15	4–8	3rd-t	
1947	Wolter	19-11-1	7–8	3rd-t	
1948	Wolter	15–11	5–9	4th	
1949	Wolter	18–12	7–8	4th	
Wolter:		265-304-5			
Everett Dean (CIBA) (1950–1955)
1950	Dean	19–15	10–5	1st	
1951	Dean	21–13	9–9	3rd	
1952	Dean	19-13-1	9–7	2nd	
1953	Dean	29-15-2	10–6	1st-t	College World Series Appearance
1954	Dean	18–12	9–7	2nd	
1955	Dean	19-15-1	9–7	3rd	
Dean:		125-83-4			
Dutch Fehring (CIBA/PCC) (1956–1967)
1956	Fehring	24-10-1	9–7	2nd-t	
1957	Fehring	17–13	7–9	3rd	
1958	Fehring	23–12	7–9	3rd	
1959	Fehring	21–13	9–7	2nd-t	
1960	Fehring	20–17	6–10	3rd-t	
1961	Fehring	26–17	5–11	4th-t	
1962	Fehring	21–14	6–10	4th	
1963	Fehring	24–11	8–8	4th	
1964	Fehring	20–24	4–16	6th	
1965	Fehring	32–13	11–9	1st-t	
1966	Fehring	26-12-2	12–8	2nd-t	
1967	Fehring	36-6-1	10–1	1st	College World Series Appearance
Fehring:		290-162-4			
Ray Young (PCC) (1968–1976)
1968	Young	36–12	13–5	2nd	
1969	Young	34–12	16–5	2nd	
1970	Young	36-16-1	8–9	4th	
1971	Young	39-20-1	11–6	2nd-t	
1972	Young	37-17-1	9–9	2nd-t	
1973	Young	37–20	9–9	2nd	
1974	Young	28–19	10–8	2nd	
1975	Young	37–22	9–9	2nd	
1976	Young	42–23	14–10	3rd	
Young:		326-161-3			
Mark Marquess (Pac-12) (1977–2017)
1977	Marquess	43–23	5–13	3rd-t	
1978	Marquess	35-20-1	6–12	3rd-t	
1979	Marquess	35–23	13–17	5th	
1980	Marquess	29–24	13–17	5th-t	
1981	Marquess	43–22	16–14	2nd	NCAA Regional
1982	Marquess	49-18-1	20–10	2nd	College World Series
1983	Marquess	41-17-1	20–10	1st	College World Series
1984	Marquess	38-26-1	18–12	2nd-t	NCAA Regional
1985	Marquess	47–15	23–7	1st	College World Series
1986	Marquess	38–22	18–12	2nd-t	NCAA Regional
1987	Marquess	53–17	21–9	1st	CWS Champion
1988	Marquess	46–23	18–12	2nd	CWS Champion
1989	Marquess	30–28	12–18	4th	
1990	Marquess	59–12	24–6	1st	College World Series
1991	Marquess	39–23	18–12	2nd	NCAA Regional
1992	Marquess	39–23	17–13	2nd	NCAA Regional
1993	Marquess	27–28	10–20	6th	
1994	Marquess	36–24	21–9	1st	NCAA Regional
1995	Marquess	40–25	20–10	2nd	College World Series
1996	Marquess	41–19	19–11	2nd	NCAA Regional
1997	Marquess	45–20	21–9	1st	College World Series
1998	Marquess	42-14-1	22–8	1st	NCAA Regional
1999	Marquess	50–15	19–5	1st	College World Series
2000	Marquess	50–16	17–7	1st-t	College World Series Runner-up
2001	Marquess	51–17	17–7	2nd	College World Series Runner-up
2002	Marquess	47–18	16–8	2nd	College World Series
2003	Marquess	51–18	18–6	1st	College World Series Runner-up
2004	Marquess	46–14	16–8	1st	NCAA Regional
2005	Marquess	34–25	12–12	6th-t	NCAA Regional
2006	Marquess	33–27	11–13	5th-t	NCAA Regional
2007	Marquess	28–28	9–15	8th	-
2008	Marquess	41-24-2	14–10	2nd	College World Series
2009	Marquess	30–25	13–14	5th-t	-
2010	Marquess	31–25	14–13	4th	NCAA Regional
2011	Marquess	35–22	14–12	5th	NCAA Super Regional
2012	Marquess	41–18	18–12	4th-t	NCAA Super Regional
2013	Marquess	32–22	16–14	4th-t	
2014	Marquess	35–26	16–14	5th-t	NCAA Super Regional
2015	Marquess	24–32	9–21	10th	
2016	Marquess	31–23	15–15	6th-t	
2017	Marquess	42–16	21–9	2nd	NCAA Regional
Marquess:		1,627-878-7			
David Esquer (Pac-12) (2018–2024)
2018	Esquer	46–12	22–8	1st	NCAA Regional
2019	Esquer	45–14	20–6	2nd	NCAA Super Regional
2020	Esquer	5–11	0–1	11th	
2021	Esquer	39–17	17–10	3rd	College World Series
2022	Esquer	47–18	21–9	1st	College World Series
2023	Esquer	44–20	23–7	1st	College World Series
2024	Esquer	22–33	11–19	8th	
David Esquer (ACC) (2025–present)
2025	Esquer	27–25	11–19	13th	
Esquer:		275–150			
Total:		3,090-1,947-34			
National champion Postseason invitational champion Conference regular season champion Conference regular season and conference tournament champion Division regular season champion Division regular season and conference tournament champion Conference tournament champion

== Stadium ==
Klein Field at Sunken Diamond is one of the premier collegiate baseball stadiums in the country. When the football stadium was originally built in 1921, dirt was excavated from the site of the future baseball stadium, which created a "sunken" field a decade later.

== Record versus opponent ==
Opponent	Won	Lost	Tied	Pct.	First Played	Last Played
Air Force	9	1	0	.900	1962	1971
Alabama	2	1	0	.667	2000	2000
Appalachian State	1	0	0	1.000	1986	1986
Arkansas	4	2	0	.667	1985	2022
Auburn	4	1	0	.800	1967	2022
Ball State	1	0	0	1.000	2019	2019
Baylor	1	1	0	.500	2005	2018
Binghamton	1	0	0	1.000	2022	2022
Boise State	1	0	0	1.000	1978	1978
BYU	8	2	0	.800	1968	2018
Cal Poly Pomona	16	7	0	.696	1962	1982
Cal Poly	43	4	0	.915	1959	2022
Cal State Bakersfield	3	0	0	1.000	2023	2023
CS Dominguez Hills	0	1	0	.000	1978	1978
Cal State Fullerton	76	57	0	.571	1979	2025
Cal State Hayward	26	5	2	.818	1965	1988
Cal State Los Angeles	12	3	0	.800	1959	1997
Cal State Northridge	8	4	1	.654	1965	2022
California Western	1	1	0	.500	1962	1962
Campbell	1	0	0	1.000	1990	1990
Chapman	3	1	0	.750	1968	1971
Chico State	9	2	0	.818	1961	1970
Claremont	2	1	0	.667	1962	1972
Connecticut	2	1	0	.667	2022	2022
Cornell	2	0	0	1.000	1972	1975
Creighton	1	2	0	.333	2024	2024
Delaware	1	0	0	1.000	1976	1976
Eastern Michigan	1	0	0	1.000	1976	1976
Fordham	1	0	0	1.000	1988	1988
Fresno State	88	46	1	.656	1959	2021
Georgia	3	4	0	.429	1987	2008
Georgia Southern	1	0	0	1.000	1990	1990
Gonzaga	4	1	0	.800	1976	2019
Grand Canyon	5	4	0	.556	2019	2025
Hawaii	18	10	1	.638	1961	2010
Houston	1	1	0	.500	1967	2020
Humboldt State	5	0	0	1.000	1963	1980
Illinois	1	0	0	1.000	2011	2011
Illinois-Chicago	1	0	0	1.000	2003	2003
Indiana	4	3	0	.571	2014	2022
Indiana State	1	0	0	1.000	2014	2014
James Madison	1	0	0	1.000	1983	1983
Kansas	18	3	0	.857	2004	2017
Kansas State	3	3	0	.500	1971	2020
Kentucky	2	0	0	1.000	1988	1988
Lamar	3	1	0	.750	1981	1995
Lewis and Clark	1	0	0	1.000	1990	1990
Long Beach State	13	7	0	.650	1960	2017
Louisiana	3	0	0	1.000	2000	2022
Loyola Marymount	5	1	0	.833	1979	1999
LSU	1	3	0	.250	1987	2000
Maine	0	3	0	.000	1978	1982
Marist	2	0	0	1.000	2001	2001
Massachusetts	0	1	0	.000	1973	1973
Michigan	5	1	0	.833	1983	2020
Middle Tennessee State	1	0	0	1.000	1990	1990
Minnesota	3	1	0	.750	1987	1998
Mississippi State	2	2	0	.500	1990	2019
Nebraska	6	2	0	.750	1985	2008
Nevada	21	8	0	.724	1973	2015
New Mexico	3	2	0	.600	1972	2010
North Dakota State	1	0	0	1.000	2021	2021
Northeastern	1	0	0	1.000	1997	1997
Oklahoma	4	3	0	.571	1971	2023
Oklahoma State	1	4	0	.200	1983	1987
Oral Roberts	1	2	0	.333	1978	1987
Pacific	66	11	1	.853	1959	2023
Penn State	2	2	0	.500	1996	2024
Pepperdine	25	5	0	.833	1959	2019
Portland State	1	0	0	1.000	1966	1966
Rice	27	12	0	.692	1991	2024
Richmond	1	0	0	1.000	2003	2003
Rutgers	1	0	0	1.000	1988	1988
Sacramento State	34	16	0	.680	1959	2025
Saint Mary’s	69	15	1	.818	1962	2022
San Diego	2	1	0	.667	1977	2018
San Diego State	11	3	0	.786	1960	2022
San Francisco	101	18	2	.843	1959	2022
San Francisco State	45	3	0	.938	1959	1996
San Jose State	110	40	0	.733	1959	2025
Santa Clara	150	84	1	.640	1959	2025
Sonoma State	2	1	0	.667	1981	1983
South Carolina	6	1	0	.857	1972	2003
Southern Illinois	1	0	0	1.000	1975	1975
St. John’s	2	1	0	.667	1970	2004
Stanislaus State	11	0	0	1.000	1972	1990
Stetson	1	0	0	1.000	1992	1992
TCU	1	1	0	.500	2005	2005
Tennessee	1	3	0	.250	1972	2023
Texas	47	37	1	.559	1981	2023
Texas A&M	3	1	0	.750	1997	2023
Texas State	2	1	0	.667	2022	2022
Texas Tech	5	5	0	.500	1995	2024
UTSA	1	1	0	.500	2005	2022
Tulane	3	1	0	.750	1974	2001
Tulsa	1	1	0	.500	1970	1976
U. S. International	0	1	0	.000	1985	1985
UC Davis	57	15	0	.792	1960	2025
UC Irvine	9	2	0	.818	1972	2021
UC Riverside	8	4	0	.667	1970	2003
UC Santa Barbara	31	20	0	.608	1963	2022
UNLV	5	9	0	.357	1980	2024
Valdosta State	1	0	0	1.000	1978	1978
Vanderbilt	7	10	0	.412	1973	2021
West Carolina	0	1	0	.000	1992	1992
Wichita State	2	0	0	1.000	1990	2019
Wisconsin	2	0	0	1.000	1974	1982
Wright State	1	0	0	1.000	2018	2018
Wyoming	1	0	0	1.000	1994	1994
Xavier	2	2	0	.500	2025	2025
Youngstown State	1	0	0	1.000	2014	2014

- Last updated at the conclusion of the 2025 Season.

== Record versus ACC opponents ==
Opponent	Won	Lost	Tied	Pct.	First Played	Last Played
Boston College	2	1	0	.667	2025	2025
California	211	119	1	.639	1959	2025
Clemson	3	2	0	.600	1995	2025
Duke	3	0	0	1.000	2025	2025
Florida State	9	11	0	.450	1992	2012
Georgia Tech	0	3	0	.000	2025	2025
Louisville	0	0	0	–	Never	TBD
Miami	3	5	0	.375	1985	2008
North Carolina	3	3	0	.500	1999	2025
NC State	4	2	0	.667	2006	2025
Notre Dame	3	3	0	.500	1991	2025
Pittsburgh	0	0	0	–	Never	TBD
SMU	1	0	0	1.000	1975	1975
Virginia	0	3	0	.000	2025	2025
Virginia Tech	0	1	0	.000	2025	2025
Wake Forest	1	3	0	.250	2023	2025

- Last updated at the conclusion of the 2025 Season.

== Record against former Pac-12 opponents ==
Opponent	Won	Lost	Tied	Pct.	First Played	Last Played
Arizona	121	86	0	.585	1975	2024
Arizona State	110	107	0	.507	1961	2024
California	221	119	1	.650	1959	2025
Oregon	37	24	0	.607	1961	2024
Oregon State	52	47	0	.525	1920	2024
UCLA	168	120	0	.583	1959	2024
USC	167	151	2	.525	1959	2024
Utah	28	9	0	.757	1965	2024
Washington	68	32	0	.680	1965	2025
Washington State	68	26	0	.723	1964	2024

- Last updated at the conclusion of the 2025 Season.

== Stanford in the NCAA tournament ==
The Cardinal have appeared in the NCAA Division I baseball tournament 31 times, and appearing in the College World Series 16 times. They have won two National Championships, in 1987 College World Series and 1988.

Future major league outfielder Sam Fuld's 24 career hits broke the College World Series record of 23 set by Keith Moreland in 1973–75.

== Former Cardinal in MLB ==
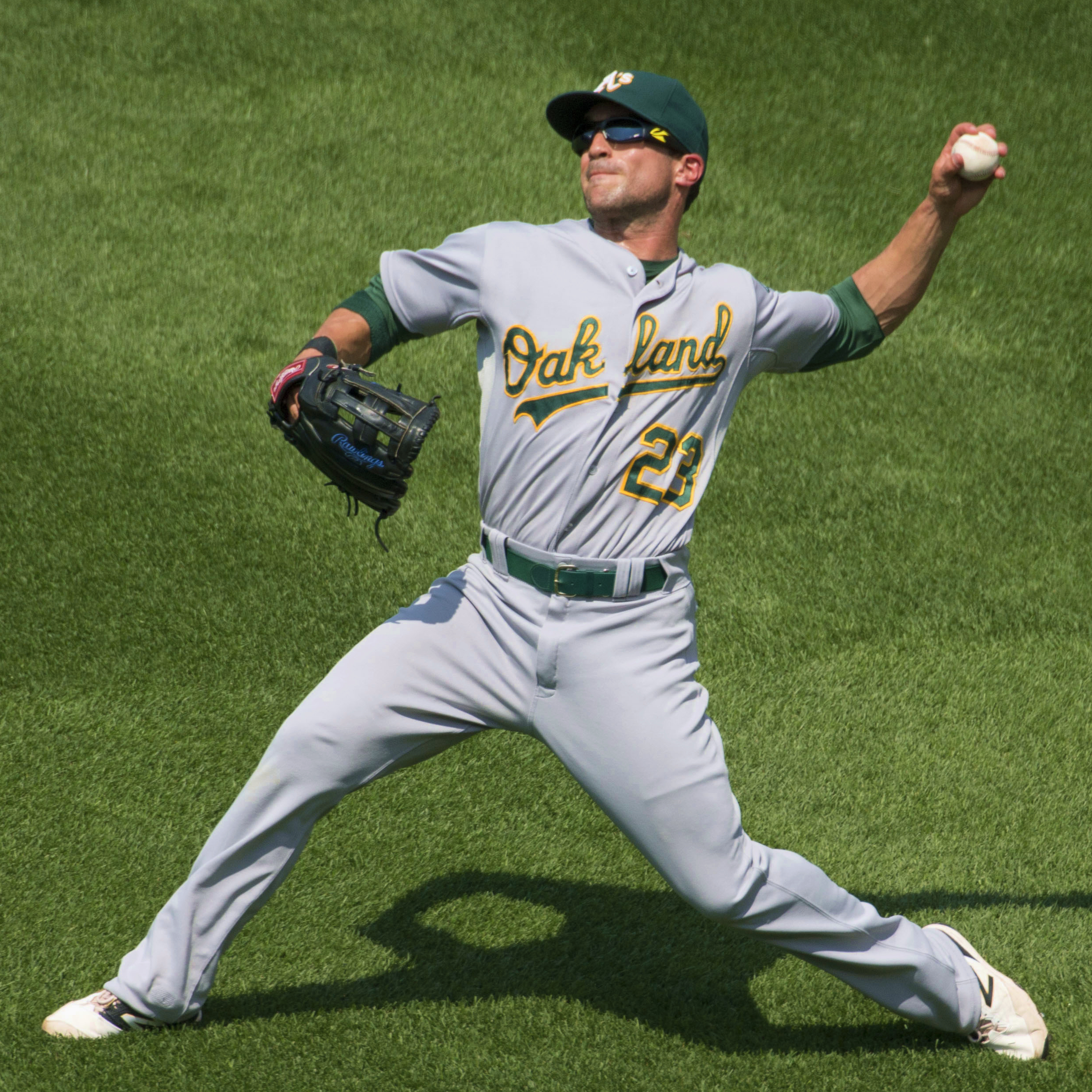
Sam Fuld

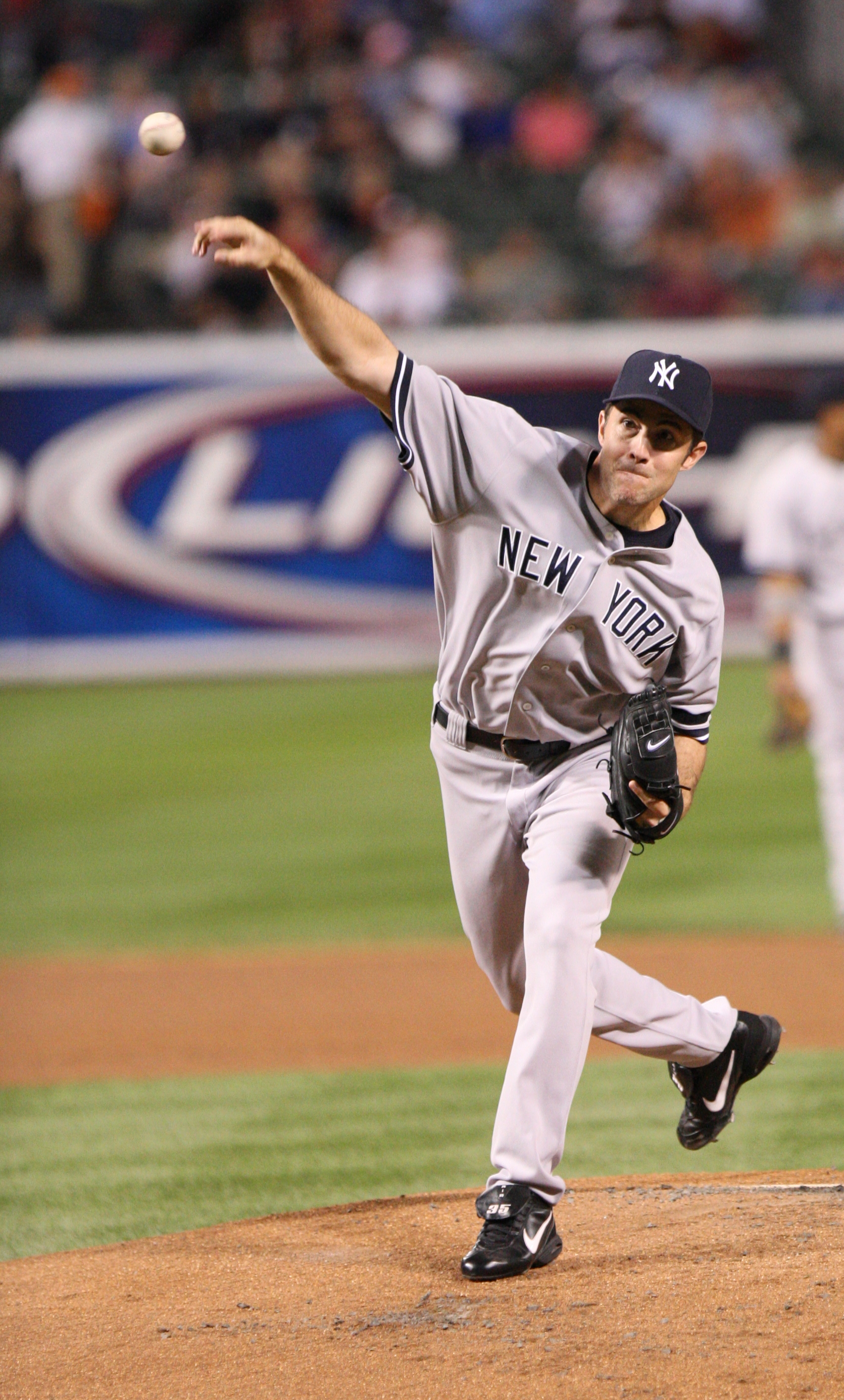
Mike Mussina

- Rubén Amaro Jr.
- Tristan Beck
- Alex Blandino
- Eric Bruntlett
- Jason Castro
- Erik Davis
- Sam Fuld
- Ryan Garko
- Jody Gerut
- Jeremy Guthrie
- Maverick Handley
- A. J. Hinch
- Nico Hoerner
- Andrew Lorraine
- Jed Lowrie
- John Mayberry Jr.
- Tommy Edman
- Jack McDowell
- Mike Mussina
- Cord Phelps
- Stephen Piscotty
- Carlos Quentin
- Bruce Robinson
- Jack Shepard
- Austin Slater
- Drew Storen
- Steve Buechele
- Kris Bubic
- Braden Montgomery
- Tommy Troy
- Tim Tawa
- Kyle Stowers

Former NFL Quarterback and current Denver Broncos executive John Elway also played baseball at Stanford for two seasons.

== See also ==
- List of NCAA Division I baseball programs
