= 1913 Pittsburgh Panthers football team =

American college football season

1913 Pittsburgh Panthers football
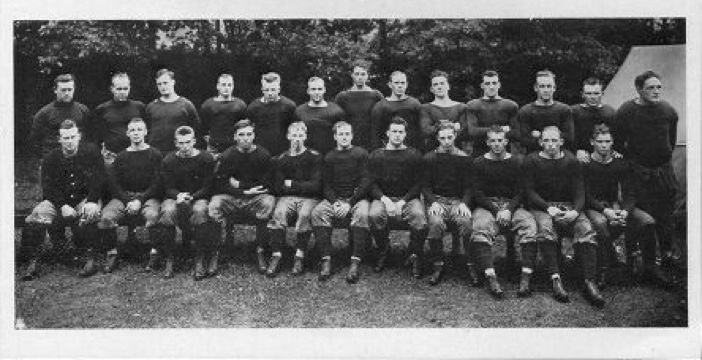
- Conference: Independent
- Record: 6–2–1
- Head coach: Joseph Duff (1st season)
- Captain: Hube Wagner
- Home stadium: Forbes Field

1913 Eastern college football independents records
	Conf.			Overall
Team	W	L	T	W		L		T
Harvard		–		9	–	0	–	0
Carlisle		–		10	–	1	–	1
Washington & Jefferson		–		10	–	0	–	1
Army		–		8	–	1	–	0
Dartmouth		–		7	–	1	–	0
Tufts		–		7	–	1	–	0
Colgate		–		6	–	1	–	1
Franklin & Marshall		–		6	–	2	–	0
Pittsburgh		–		6	–	2	–	1
Princeton		–		5	–	2	–	1
Yale		–		5	–	2	–	3
Rutgers		–		6	–	3	–	0
Penn		–		6	–	3	–	1
Villanova		–		4	–	2	–	1
Lehigh		–		5	–	3	–	0
Bucknell		–		6	–	4	–	0
Cornell		–		5	–	4	–	1
Boston College		–		4	–	3	–	1
Syracuse		–		6	–	4	–	0
Fordham		–		3	–	3	–	2
Geneva		–		4	–	4	–	0
Lafayette		–		4	–	5	–	1
Brown		–		4	–	5	–	0
Duquesne		–		3	–	5	–	1
Carnegie Tech		–		2	–	4	–	1
Holy Cross		–		3	–	6	–	0
New Hampshire		–		2	–	4	–	0
Temple		–		1	–	3	–	2
Penn State		–		2	–	6	–	0
Rhode Island State		–		2	–	6	–	0
Vermont		–		1	–	5	–	0
NYU		–		0	–	8	–	0

The 1913 Pittsburgh Panthers football team was an American football team that represented the University of Pittsburgh as an independent during the 1913 college football season. In its first season under head coach Joseph Duff, the team compiled a 6–2–1 record and outscored all opponents by a total of 165 to 46.

== Schedule ==
Date	Opponent	Site	Result	Attendance	Source
September 27	Ohio Northern	D.C. & A.C. Park; Wilkinsburg, PA	W 67–6	5,000	
October 4	at Navy	Worden Field; Annapolis, MD	T 0–0		
October 11	West Virginia	Forbes Field; Pittsburgh, PA (rivalry)	W 40–0		
October 18	Carlisle	Forbes Field; Pittsburgh, PA	W 12–6	6,000–10,000	
October 25	at Cornell	Percy Field; Ithaca, NY	W 20–7	10,000	
November 1	Bucknell	Forbes Field; Pittsburgh, PA	L 0–9		
November 8	Lafayette	Forbes Field; Pittsburgh, PA	W 13–0		
November 15	Washington & Jefferson	Forbes Field; Pittsburgh, PA	L 6–19	25,000	
November 27	Penn State	Forbes Field; Pittsburgh, PA (rivalry)	W 7–6	18,000	

== Preseason ==
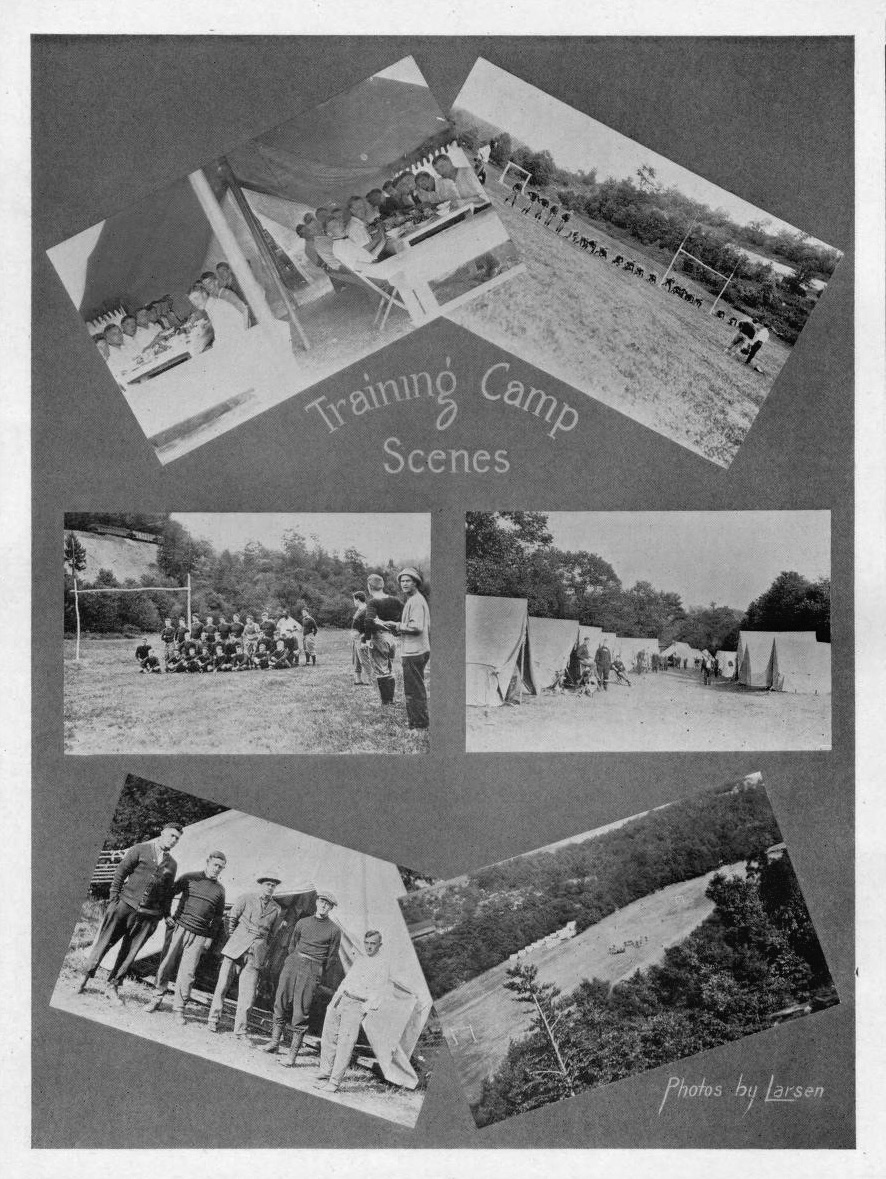
1913 Camp Hamilton Photos

John "Hube" Wagner was elected Captain for the 1913 season at the 1912 team banquet . Also, Alfred R. Hamilton, noted longtime supporter of the Pitt football program, offered the use of his farm in Windber, PA to the team for the month of September as a training facility. Thanks to Mr. Hamilton's generosity this turned into a yearly event known as "Camp Hamilton."

Laurence Hurst, the Graduate Manager of Athletics since the 1909 season, resigned to devote more time to his law practice. During his tenure, he was instrumental in negotiating the deal with Barney Dreyfuss to play the home games at Forbes Field; he instituted mail order ticket procedures; he managed the payment of the part time employees needed for the games; he set up a schedule of teams that fans wanted to see play; and the athletic department went from being in debt to having a surplus.

Karl E. Davis was appointed Graduate Manager of Athletics by the Athletic Committee on December 11, 1912. Mr. Davis was a 1910 graduate of the University with a Civil Engineering degree. The Pitt Weekly lauded the appointment: "His selection as a graduate manager is a fitting tribute to his energy, loyalty, and value as an athletic manager, and if his past performances indicate anything, he will certainly make good with a vengeance." Mr. Davis appointed Howard Jenkins, a senior in the Engineering Department, student football manager for the 1913 season. Mr. Davis had the full football schedule arranged by mid-February and The Gazette Times touted it as "the hardest card in its history."

The Pitt Athletic Committee met on April 9 and announced that they hired 1911 Princeton All-American lineman Joseph Duff as coach for the 1913 season. His assistant coach was Edwin H. W. Harlan, a 1907 All-American Princeton halfback. In his first week as coach, Mr. Duff called on all the players to report to spring practice. This was the first year spring practice was held at Pitt. It ran from April 14 - April 26. Preseason conditioning began on September 3 when the team gathered on Alfred Hamilton's farm near Windber, PA. for the inaugural session of "Camp Hamilton." The team "worked hard and patiently until the opening game with Ohio Northern on Saturday, September 27."

== Coaching staff ==
1913 Pittsburgh Panthers football staff
Coaching staff: Joseph M. Duff Jr. – Head coach; Edwin H. W. Harlan – Assistant backfield coach	Support staff: Howard Jenkins – Student football manager; Karl E. Davis – Graduate manager of athletics; Charles S. Miller – Director of athletics

== Roster ==
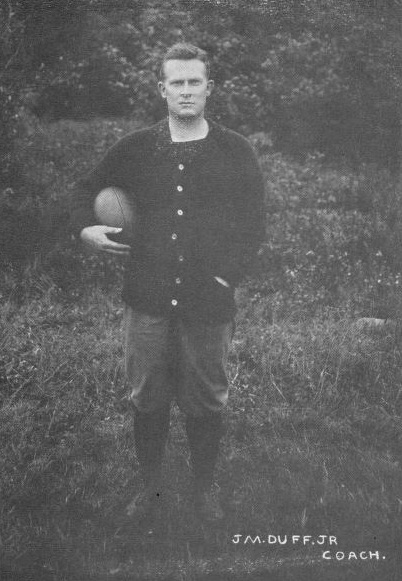
Coach Joseph Duff

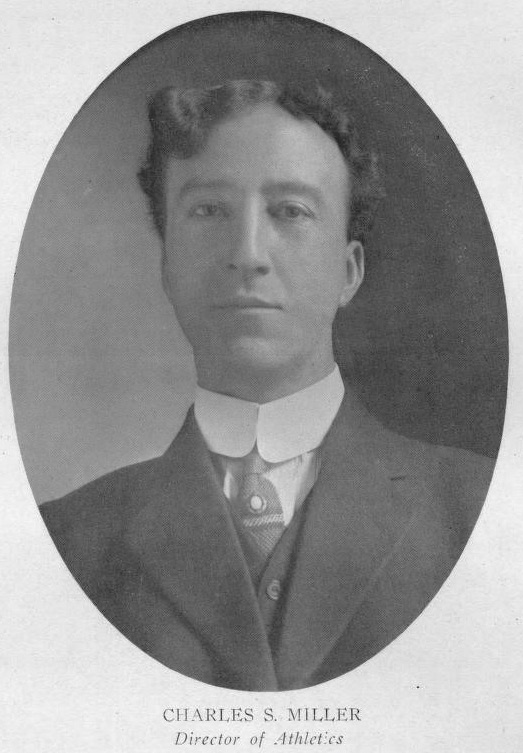
Director of Athletics, Charles S. Miller

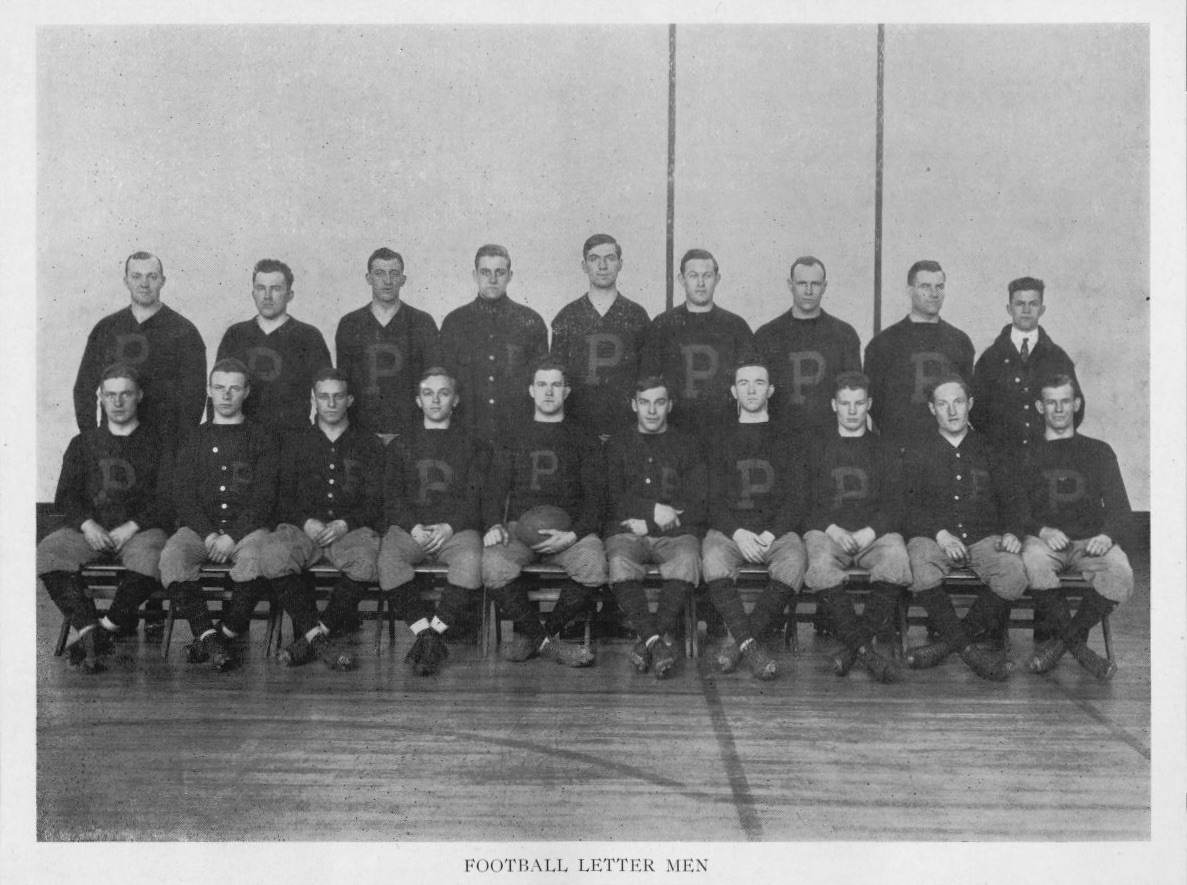
1913 Football Lettermen

1913 Pittsburgh Panthers football roster
Player	Position	Games	Height	Weight	Class	Prep School	Degree	Residence
Hube Wagner*	end	9	5' 11"	185	1914	Monaca H.S.	Doctor of Medicine	Monaca, PA
Leo Collins*	end	8	5' 10"	180	1915	East Pittsburgh H.S.	Bachelor of Laws	East Pittsburgh, PA
Philip Dillon*	halfback	8	5' 7"	170	1916	Bellefonte Academy	Associate Mining	Ellsworth, PA
William Cowell*	tackle	9	5' 8"	185	1916	Urbana (Ill.) H.S.	School of Mines	
Fred Ward*	halfback	4	5' 7"	150	1916	New Kensington H.S.	Doctor of Dental Surgery	Beaver Falls, PA
Wayne Smith*	guard	8	5' 9"	200	1915	Bellefonte Academy	Doctor of Dental Surgery	Pittsburgh, PA
Robert Peck*	halfback	9	5' 8"	170	1917	Pawling School N.Y.	Economics	Culver, IN
Charles Reese*	end	8	6' 1"	180	1915	Bellefonte Academy	Doctor of Dental Surgery	Warren, PA
Isadore Shapira*	center	8	5' 10"	180	1916	East Liberty Academy	Bachelor of Science in Economics	Pittsburgh, PA
Harry Shof*	halfback	3	5' 7"	150	1916	Greensburg Seminary	Assoc. College 1916 and Assoc. Medical 1918	
James P. Herron*	end	3	5' 10"	135	1915	Monessen H.S.	Bachelor of Arts	Pittsburgh, PA
Mark Hoag*	tackle	6	5' 11"	175	1914	Holy Cross Prep	Doctor of Dental Surgery	Lock Haven, PA
Rendall Soppitt*	guard	6	6' 1"	185	1917	Greensburg H.S.	School of Mines	Latrobe, PA
E. Fred Ammons*	fullback	8	5' 11"		1916	Arkansas City (KS) H.S.	Doctor of Dental Surgery	Tulsa, OK
Claude Thornhill*	tackle	6	6' 0"	200	1917	Beaver H.S.	School of Mines	Berkeley, CA
Roy Heil*	quarterback	9	5' 6"	135	1916	Topeka, (Kan.) H.S.	Doctor of Dental Surgery	Topeka, KS
Guy Williamson*	halfback	9	5' 9"	155	1916	New Mexico Military Academy	School of Mines	
James Jones*	tackle	1	5' 10"	155	1917	Johnstown H.S.	Associate Mine degree	Johnstown, PA
Enoch Pratt	tackle	1	6' 4"	215	1914	Pittsburgh H.S.	Associate Engineering	Pittsburgh, PA
Roy Kernohan	halfback	1	5' 11"	168	1915	Homestead H.S.	Doctor of Dental Surgery	Homestead, PA
Carl Hockensmith	center	1	5' 11"	220	1916	The Kiski School	Associate Engineering	Penn Station, PA
Justice Egbert	fullback	3	6' 0"	160	1916	East Liberty Academy	Associate Engineering	Pittsburgh, PA
William McHugh	end	1	5' 9"		1917	Scranton H.S.	Associate College	Scranton, PA
John Cummins	center	0	5' 11"		1914	California Normal	Bachelor of Science	Ben Avon, PA
Charles B. Daugherty	0	end	5' 11"		1916	Jeanette H.S.	Graduate in Pharmacy	Jeanette, PA
David McCandless	center	1			1917		Associate Engineering	Pittsburgh, PA
Thomas Frazier	end	2			1916		Bachelor of Science (Chemistry	Pittsburgh, PA
* Lettermen

== Game summaries ==
=== Ohio Northern ===
Week 1: Ohio Northern at Pitt

Team	1	2	3	4	Total
Ohio Northern	6	0	0	0	6
• Pitt	12	14	21	20	67

- Date: September 27, 1913
- Location: D. C. & A. C. Park
  Pittsburgh, PA
- Game start: 3:00 p.m.
- Referee: Ewing Rafferty (Princeton)

Reporter L. G. Boggs of The Pittsburgh Press penned:

"Pitt's football warriors opened the season at D. C. & A. C. Park, Wilkinsburg, yesterday by defeating the Ohio Northern University eleven 67–6. The game was closer than the score indicates. Ohio Northern players fought gamely every inch of the way and made Coach Duff's men play the limit for every point they made. A crowd estimated at 5,000 packed the park. It was one of the largest crowds that ever turned out for the opening game of the season."

Pitt's record against the Polar Bears was 6–0 and they outscored the Ohio eleven 179–6. These two teams would not play again until September 24, 1932. Ohio Northern would finish the 1913 season under Coach Carl Peters with a 4–6–1 record.

Pitt scored ten touchdowns and seven goals after. The only mystery was that the local newspapers could not agree on who scored the touchdowns. The consensus seemed to be that Philip Dillon scored five to lead the team in scoring. Hube Wagner scored four and Guy Williamson scored one. Bob Peck converted five goal afters and Guy Williamson added two. Coach Duff was able to play nineteen men and observe the scrubs in game action. The Polar Bears scored their first points ever against Pitt on a thirty-yard pass play from quarterback Stump to his left end Gardner.

Mr. Boggs of The Pittsburg Press added:"One thing in evidence throughout the entire game, was that the Pitt men were tackling far better than they did last season. The men evidently have been instructed in the art by Coach Duff."

The Pitt lineup for the game against Ohio Northern was Hube Wagner and William McHugh (left end), "Tiny" Thornhill and Mark Hoag (left tackle), Rendall Soppitt and Enoch Pratt (left guard), Isadore Shapira (center), Wayne Smith (right guard), William Cowell and Chuck Reese (right tackle), Leo Collins, William McHugh and Thomas Frazier (right end), Roy Heil and Fred Ward (quarterback), Bob Peck and Guy Williamson (left halfback), Philip Dillon and Harry Shof (right halfback) and Fred Ammons (fullback). The game was played in 12-minute quarters.

=== At Navy ===
Week 2: Pitt at Navy

Team	1	2	3	4	Total
Pitt	0	0	0	0	0
Navy	0	0	0	0	0

- Date: October 4, 1913
- Location: Worden Field
  Annapolis, MD
- Game start: 2:30 p.m.
- Referee: Charles A. Taussig (Cornell)

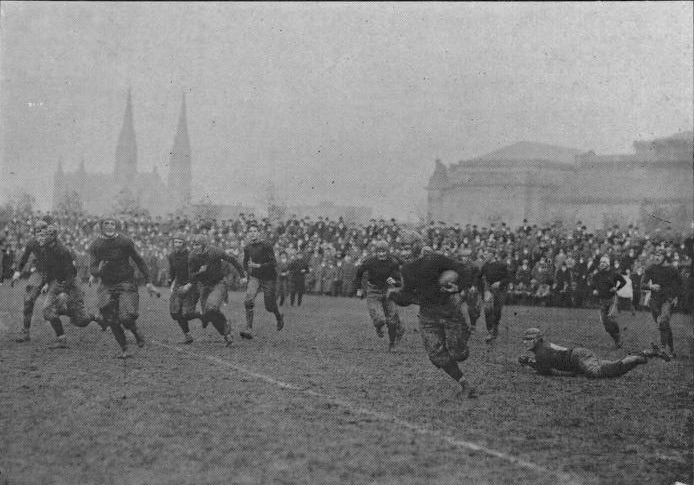
1913 Pittsburgh football game action photo

The first road game entailed a ride on the Pennsylvania Railroad east to Annapolis, MD. The Pitt team secured a sleeper car and boarded the train early (9 p.m.) on Thursday evening "in order to give them the benefit of the extra slumber." The train departed at 11:15 and the team arrived in Annapolis on Friday morning. They held a practice at St. John's College and then were "the guests of the Naval Academy in Bancroft Hall, the stately dormitory of the sailors."

Navy was led by third year coach Douglas Legate Howard and they would finish the season with a 7–1–1 record. Pitt fielded the same starting lineup as in the Ohio Northern game and the Naval Academy lineup boasted eight veterans from the 1912 team that defeated Pitt.

The Gazette Times special telegram from R. H. Riley stated:

"The football warriors of the University of Pittsburgh and the Naval Academy, both wearing Blue and Gold, battled here this afternoon during 48 minutes of actual football and the final result was a scoreless tie."

On Navy's second possession, they advanced the ball to the Pitt 35-yard line. On first down Navy guard Brown faked a field goal and was tackled for a loss. On second down he attempted a field goal "which was smeared by several Pitt linemen." Early in the second quarter, the Navy offense again advanced to the Pitt 25-yard line. "Brown again tried a field goal from placement, but it was blocked." The Pittsburgh defense kept the Midshipmen out of scoring range for the remainder of the first half.

"The Pitt squad went wild in the third quarter when after advancing the ball to the Navy 20-yard line, Heil shot a forward pass to Wagner which the latter grabbed on the bound and carried over the Navy line." The officials claimed another Pitt player had touched the ball and did not allow the touchdown. "Coach Duff was in evidence on the field, vigorously protesting the decision which spoiled a victory for Pittsburgh." Navy then blocked Heil's field goal attempt and regained possession. The remainder of the game was a punting duel with penalties and interceptions stalling both teams offensive drives.

The Pitt lineup for the game against Navy was Hube Wagner (left end), William Cowell (left tackle), Rendall Soppitt (left guard), Isadore Shapira (center), Wayne Smith (right guard), Claude Thornhill (right tackle), Leo Collins (right end), Roy Heil (quarterback), Robert Peck and Guy Williamson (left halfback), Philip Dillon and Thomas Frazier (right halfback) and Fred Ammons (fullback). The game was played in 12-minute quarters.

=== West Virginia ===
Week 3: West Virginia at Pitt

Team	1	2	3	4	Total
West Virginia	0	0	0	0	0
• Pitt	7	0	20	13	40

- Date: October 11, 1913
- Location: Forbes Field
  Pittsburgh, PA
- Game start: 3:00 p.m.
- Referee: Walter S. Sugden (Harvard)

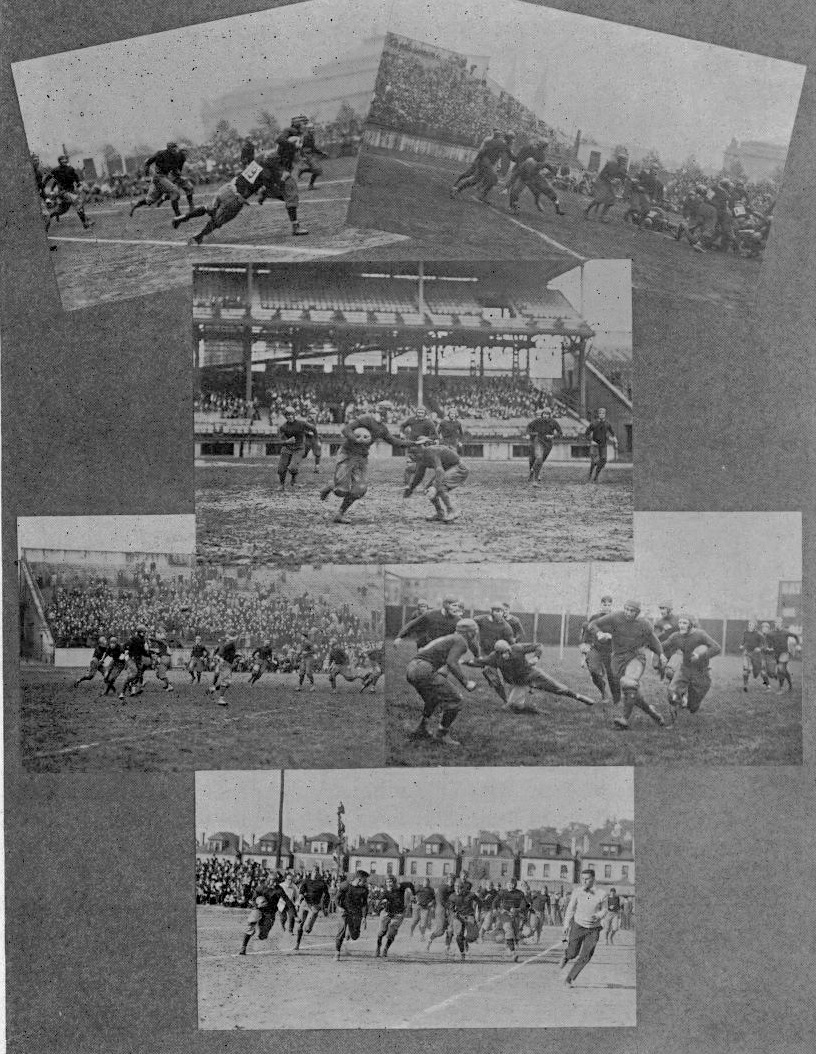
1913 Pitt football game action photo collage

The October 11 thirteenth edition of the "Backyard Brawl" took place on a muddy Forbes Field. Pitt held a slim 6–5–1 lead in the series after losing five of the first six games. The Mountaineers were led by first year coach Edwin Sweetland and would finish the season with a 3–4–2 record.

The Pitt Weekly reported:

"Pitt got away with a 40–0 victory in the first real home game of the season last Saturday. Although the game was preceded by a heavy downpour and a steady drizzle kept up during the entire game, making the field very slow, our team showed amazing speed, and outplayed West Virginia in every aspect of the game."

On Pitt's second possession, Roy Heil passed to a wide open Hube Wagner in the end zone, but the pass was incomplete. After a punt, a fumble and another exchange of punts Pitt had possession on the Mountaineer 20-yard line. "Peck and Williamson between them escorted the ball to the one yard marker." Fred Ammons plunged for the touchdown. Robert Peck was good on the goal after. The remainder of the first half was a series of punts, fumbles, and penalties by each team.

"It was not made public what Duff said to the men during the interim between the halves but it must have had the tabasco tinge to it, for the Pittites went into the game hot and heavy from the start." The visitors received the second half kickoff and muffed a trick play. They punted and Roy Heil returned the punt to the Mountaineer 20-yard line. On first down Guy Williamson raced around the end for the score. Robert Peck was successful on the point after. Pitt 14 to WVA 0. On their next possession, Pitt fumbled on the West Virginia 15-yard line. "Robert Peck put the hummer on a forward pass that the enemy attempted and ran 50-yards for a touchdown. He failed at the goal." Philip Dillon replaced Guy Williamson at left halfback. "He took the ball on the first play and never stopped going until he had made 50 yards and a touchdown." Peck was good on the point after and Pitt led 27–0 at the end of three quarters.

While the rain poured, Philip Dillon was the highlight of the fourth quarter. On the ensuing drive he ran the ball 25 yards, caught a 20 yard pass and ran it in from the seven for the touchdown. The final score was a 35 yard pass play from Dillon to Peck. Dillon was good on the point after.

The Pitt lineup for the game against West Virginia was Hube Wagner (left end), William Cowell (left tackle), Rendall Soppitt and Wayne Smith (left guard), David McCandless and Carl Hockensmith (center), Chuck Reese (right guard), Claude Thornhill and James Jones (right tackle), Leo Collins (right end), Roy Heil and Fred Ward (quarterback), Guy Williamson and Philip Dillon (left halfback), Robert Peck (right halfback), and Fred Ammons and Justice Egbert (fullback). The game was played in 15-minute quarters.

=== Carlisle ===
Week 4: Carlisle at Pitt

Team	1	2	3	4	Total
Carlisle	0	6	0	0	6
• Pitt	0	0	0	12	12

- Date: October 11, 1913
- Location: Forbes Field
  Pittsburgh, PA
- Game start: 3:00 p.m.
- Referee: Harvey Smith (Pennsylvania)

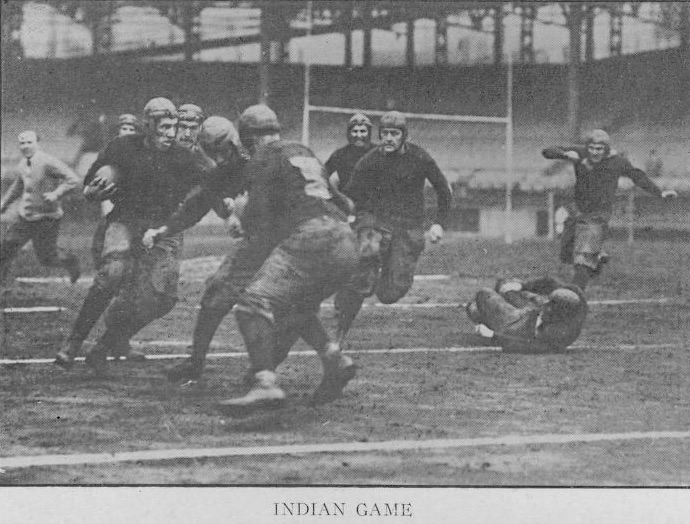
1913 Pitt versus Carlisle game action

Pitt was 1–4 all-time against Pop Warner's Carlisle football machine. They had been out scored 93–22. Carlisle came to Pittsburgh with a 5–0 record, having beaten a strong Cornell team the previous week. The Carlisle team was minus Jim Thorpe but still had Hall-of-Famers Joe Guyon and Gus Welch in the lineup. Carlisle would finish the season 10–1–1.

The Owl Yearbook stated:

"On October eighteenth, the Carlisle Indians invaded Pittsburgh and met the surprise of their lives at the hands of the Wagner tribesmen. After a battle that raged desperately for every minute of the four long quarters, the Indians went down to defeat by the score of 12–6."

The Pitt offense could not sustain a drive in the first half. The Pitt defense thwarted two scoring chances of the Indians. On Carlisle's first possession they advanced the ball to the Pitt 15-yard line. Their center "Garlow attempted a field goal, which was blocked and Robert Peck grabbed the ball for Pitt on the 33-yard line." Early in the second quarter the Carlisle offense advanced the ball to the Pitt 3-yard line. A fifteen yard penalty, a gain of ten, a gain of four, a loss of three and a short pass turned the ball over to Pitt on downs. Pitt punted out of danger but the Carlisle offense behind the running of Joe Guyon, Calac and Gus Welch worked the ball to the Pitt four yard line. Three plays later "Guyon worked his way through center for touchdown." Garlow missed the goal after. Carlisle led at halftime 6 to 0.

When Pitt took the field for the second half Philip Dillon replaced Robert Peck at right halfback. Late in the third quarter Pitt gained possession on their 34-yard line. Dillon and Fred Ammons advanced the ball to the Indians 28-yard line. "A forward pass, Williamson to Wagner, netted 19 yards and the ball was on the nine.” Dillon carried to the six and the period was over. After the break, “Ammons tried a center buck, but was repulsed." Next play Guy Williamson connected with Wayne Smith on a nine yard touchdown pass. Williamson missed the goal after, but the score was tied 6 to 6. The Carlisle offense then advanced the ball to the Pitt 26-yard line and the Pitt defense stiffened. Garlow tried a field goal, but it was short. Pitt was forced to punt and Gus Welch fumbled it. Hube Wagner was in the right place at the right time as the ball bounced into his hands and it was Pitt ball on the Carlisle 5-yard line. On fourth down Roy Heil "took it to the line on a quarterback buck, scoring the winning touchdown for Pitt." The goal after was unsuccessful. Pitt held on for the 12 to 6 victory.

The Pittsburgh Post reported from Carlisle:

"The defeat of the Carlisle Indians on Saturday by the University of Pittsburgh was due to faulty managements of punts and almost inexcusable inability at intercepting of forward passes, combined with hindrance offered by the slippery field to the fast footwork of the Indian stars. Great credit is given by Warner and all of the Indians to Pittsburgh for her stubborn, seemingly uphill fight, which she nosed out to creditable victory. Wagner's fine tackling and Williamson's forward passing have been the subject of high compliment among the Redskins."

The Pitt lineup for the game against Carlisle was Hube Wagner (left end), William Cowell (left tackle), Rendall Soppitt and Wayne Smith (left guard), Isadore Shapira (center), Chuck Reese (right guard), Claude Thornhill and Mark Hoag (right tackle), Leo Collins (right end), Roy Heil (quarterback), Guy Williamson (left halfback), Robert Peck and Philip Dillon (right halfback), and Fred Ammons (fullback). The game was played in 15-minute quarters.

=== At Cornell ===
Week 5: Pitt at Cornell

Team	1	2	3	4	Total
• Pitt	0	0	7	13	20
Cornell	0	7	0	0	7

- Date: October 25, 1913
- Location: Percy Field
  Ithaca, NY
- Game start: 2:30 p.m.
- Referee: James H. Moffat (Princeton)

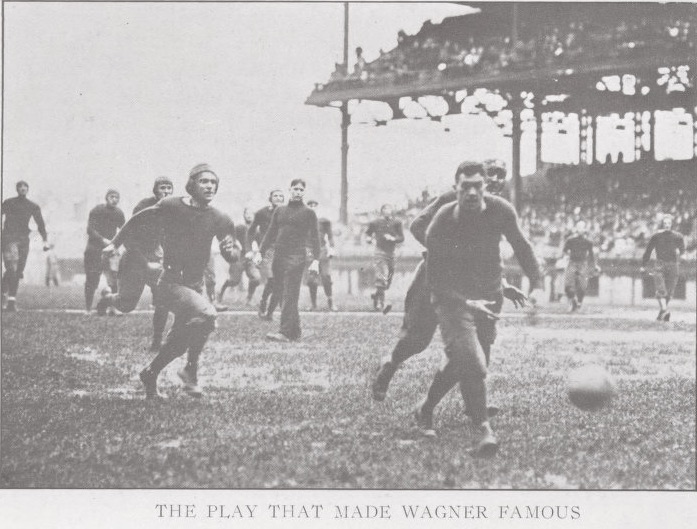
Hube Wagner recovers fumble and races for a touchdown

On Thursday evening October 23, the Pitt Band led a parade of 1,000 students to the Pittsburgh & Lake Erie train depot to send the football team off to Ithaca, NY with a "resounding "Alle-ge- nee" as the train pulled out." The team changed trains in Buffalo and rode the Lehigh Valley R. R. into Ithaca at noon Friday. They stayed at the Rogues Harbor Inn and had a short practice on their field. Pitt was 0–4 all-time against Cornell, and had been out scored 80–8. Cornell was led by second year coach Albert Sharpe and finished the season with a 5–4–1 record.

Richard Guy of The Gazette Times reported:

"The University of Pittsburgh today walloped Cornell University in football 20–7. "Follow the ball," the time honored cry of the coaches, is what Pitt did today and the result thereby was the first victory for the Pittsburgh team over one of the big six elevens, and the creation of a Pitt athletic hero whose prowess, will be remembered in Pitt councils for generations. He is Hube Wagner, now a distinguished young giant."

The first quarter was scoreless, but the Cornell offense took charge late in the second. They gained possession on the Pitt 18-yard line after a short punt. Cornell backs Taber and Fritz ran the ball to the one. Quarterback Charlie "Barrett made a touchdown for Cornell through right guard." Barrett kicked the goal after. Cornell led 7 to 0 at halftime.

Philip Dillon replaced Robert Peck at halfback for the second half and promptly fumbled on the 27-yard line. Cornell recovered and advanced the ball to the Pitt three where they lost it on downs. Pitt punted out of danger. After an exchange of possessions, the Pitt offense advanced the ball to the 3-yard line of Cornell. Guy Williamson threw an interception in the end zone. Pitt regained possession and Williamson threw another interception at midfield. Cornell tried a quick kick. The Post-Gazette described:

"The ball hit Taber on the hip and bounded away, but right into the arms of Wagner who came skirting around the end. Wagner never stopped, never hesitated, but gave a bound and a leap like a deer taking fright and was on his way towards the Cornell goal line 55 yards away.... The mad dashing Wagner was not to be stopped. Williamson kicked the resulting goal and the score was a tie."

The Pitt offense scored again on their first possession of the fourth quarter. A Williamson to Dillon pass covered thirty-five yards to the Cornell 15-yard line. Fred Ammons carried it to the one and he then bulled his way into the end zone. The point after was unsuccessful. Pitt led 13 to 0. After an exchange of punts, the Pitt offense stalled and Williamson punted to Barrett on the Pitt 40-yard line. The Post-Gazette noted:

"But the ball did not stay within the grasp of the Cornell star's hand: it slipped through and before he could bend his back to recover, Wagner, picked it up and was away like a greyhound. He ran the 60-yards straight away...No player in the world would have stopped him."

Dillon kicked the goal after and Pitt won 20 to 7.

L. G. Boggs of The Pittsburg Press related: "Before the game, (Coach) Duff made a prediction to the writer – the first time he has ever made a comment before the game. "We will win today. It won't be a cinch, by a lot, but we will win, just the same." He had the dope."

The Pitt lineup for the game against Cornell was Leo Collins (left end), William Cowell (left tackle), Wayne Smith (left guard), Isadore Shapira (center), Chuck Reese (right guard), Mark Hoag (right tackle), Hube Wagner (right end), Roy Heil (quarterback), Guy Williamson (left halfback), Robert Peck and Philip Dillon (right halfbck), and Fred Ammons (fullback). The game consisted of two fifteen minute quarters and two twelve minute quarters.

=== Bucknell ===
Week 6: Bucknell at Pitt

Team	1	2	3	4	Total
• Bucknell	6	3	0	0	9
Pitt	0	0	0	0	0

- Date: November 1, 1913
- Location: Forbes Field
  Pittsburgh, PA
- Game start: 2:30 p.m.
- Referee: Wilmer G. Crowell (Swarthmore)

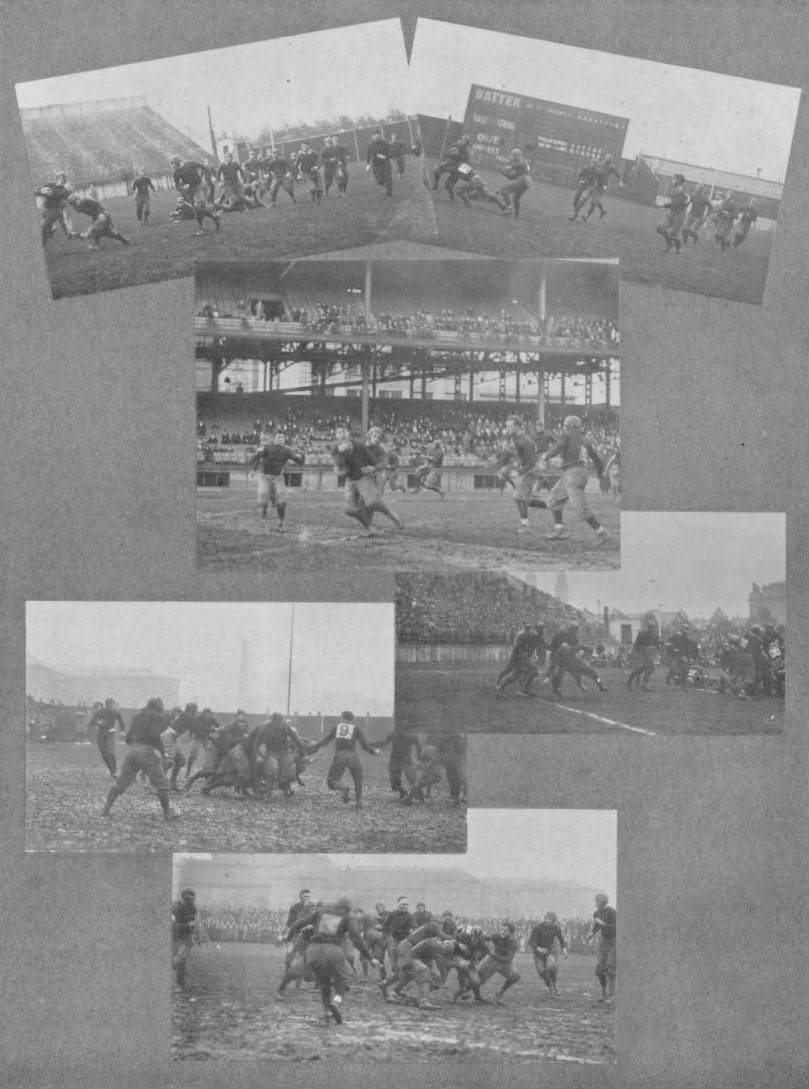
1913 Pitt football game action photos

The undefeated Pitt football eleven fresh off their victory in Ithaca, arrived home to prepare to play Bucknell. Bucknell beat Pitt for the first time in 1912. Pitt led the all-time series 3-1. The Pitt lineup was without Fred Ammons, who was in Kansas attending his mother's funeral. Coach Byron W. Dickson's team was 3–2, having lost to Cornell and Princeton. Bucknell finished the season with a 6–4 record.

The 1915 Owl Yearbook summarized this game the best:

"The varsity after its sensational string of victories, hit a severe slump the week following the Cornell game, and was beaten by Bucknell University, 9–0. Pittsburgh's offense was indifferent, the defense crumbled before the fierce attacks of her opponents, and the interference was the poorest of the season. Bucknell, on the other hand, showed surprising strength, playing a fast, clean game of football."

Richard Guy of The Gazette Times praised the enemy: "A tall, slender, light-haired young man, Dean Sturgis, a native of Uniontown, who has helped to keep Bucknell on the football map the past two years, caused dismay in the football camp of the University of Pittsburgh yesterday afternoon at Forbes Field. The teams representing their institutions met in their annual game and Bucknell won by nine points to none, and it was Sturgis who secured all of them for the team from Lewisburg."

On Bucknell's first possession, the offense took eight plays to advance the ball from their twenty-five to the thirty-five. Quarterback Cruikshank called for a spread formation and dropped back to pass. He lofted the ball 30-yards downfield to Sturgis," and the versatile Bucknell end gathered it in and ran 45-yards for a touchdown, after which he failed to kick goal."

The second quarter started with Bucknell in possession of the ball on their 47-yard line. Their offense advanced the ball to the Pitt twelve. On fourth down "Sturgis stepped back and sent the ball between the posts from the 30-yard line, making the score 9–0."

The Pitt faithful expected a second half comeback similar to the Carlisle and Cornell games but it was not to be. "Notwithstanding the fact that Duff read the riot act to the bunch during the interim between the halves, the Gold and Blue was unable to make headway against the visitors in the final periods."

Al Hamilton (Athletic Committee Member) remarked to L. G. Boggs of The Pittsburgh Press after the game:

"It was a case of overconfidence. Pitt underestimated Bucknell, and lost out because they were out played. It will do the boys a lot of good to lose this game, as they will realize that they are not unbeatable. If we had to lose, there is no team in the country that I would rather lose to than the team which won from us today. We will be back in old form next week."

The Pitt lineup for the game against Bucknell was Leo Collins and Roy Kernohan (left end), William Cowell (left tackle), Chuck Reese and Rendall Soppitt (left guard), Isadore Shapira (center), Wayne Smith (right guard), Mark Hoag (right tackle), Hube Wagner and James Herron (right end), Roy Heil (quarterback), Guy Williamson (left halfback), Robert Peck and Philip Dillon (right halfback) and Justice Egbert (fullback). The game was played in 15-minute quarters.

=== Lafayette ===
Week 7: Lafayette at Pitt

Team	1	2	3	4	Total
Lafayette	0	0	0	0	0
• Pitt	0	6	0	7	13

- Date: November 8, 1913
- Location: Forbes Field
  Pittsburgh, PA
- Game start: 2:30 p.m.
- Referee: Harvey Smith (Pennsylvania)

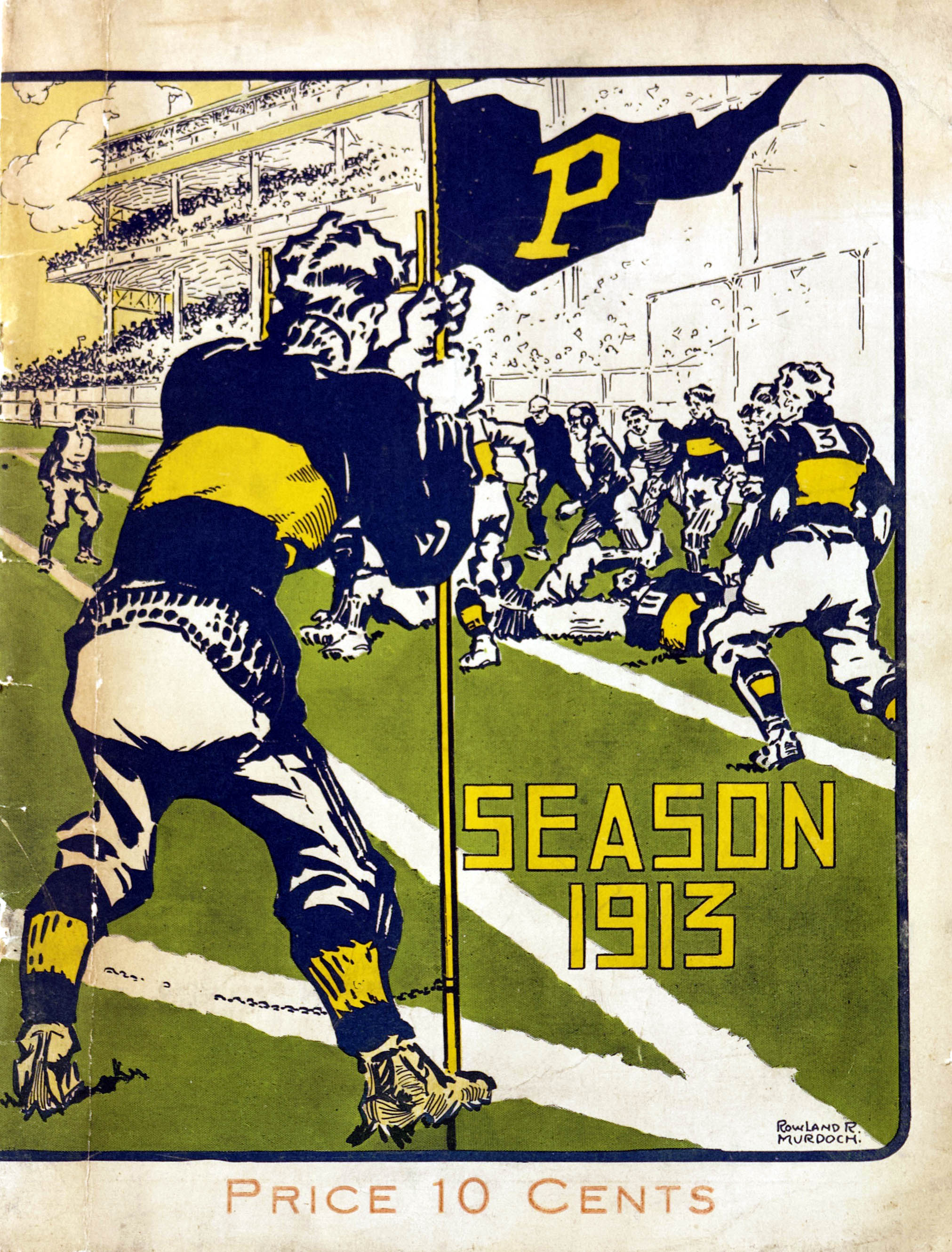
Fourth annual Pitt football yearbook used as game program

The Lafayette Leopards of Easton, PA came west to tangle with the Pitt eleven on November 8. This was the first meeting ever between these two teams. Lafayette was coached by George McCaa and sported a 3–2–1 record. They would finish the season 4–5–1. Fred Ammons was back at practice for the Pitt eleven but lineman Randall Soppitt sustained a dislocated shoulder in practice and was out until the Penn State game. After a week of strenuous practice Coach Duff decided to move Leo Collins to fullback and Fred Ammons to end for the Lafayette game. L. G. Boggs of The Pittsburg Press noted: "The combination worked fairly well."

Richard Guy of The Gazette Times wrote:

"Pitt showed the real come back spirit in football yesterday afternoon at Forbes Field by beating the Lafayette representatives in a hard-fought contest by 13 points to 0. The local eleven won this game in the face of stubborn resistance through the vigilance of Capt. Wagner, who made both touchdowns, in each instance getting the ball from Lafayette when such a contingency was the least expected."

Florent Gibson of The Pittsburgh Sunday Post was more eloquent:

"With the Wash. - Jeff. game a week hence hanging on the horizon a mass of dark storm clouds, the good ship Pitt navigated safely the reefs labeled Lafayette on the schedule chart, and the blue and gold mariners now make everything shipshape for the coming blow, conscious that they have steered an excellent course through troubled waters, with only one wreck to their credit. The score by which the blue and gold took the Easton eleven across was 13 to 0....Every person who saw yesterday's game is wondering by what wizardry Captain Hubert "On the Job" Wagner, leader of the Pitt eleven and of many dashes toward the enemies goal, manages to be on the spot at just the most opportune time."

Pitt kicked off and Lafayette advanced the ball to the Pitt 13-yard line. A fifteen yard penalty for holding and a seven yard pass play on third down prompted a 30-yard field goal attempt by Leopard fullback Scheeren that went wide. Later in the first quarter Lafayette gained possession on their 15-yard line. Dick Diamond gained thirty yards on an end run, but the Leopards were penalized for holding on the next play. Lafayette guard "Kelly went back to kick, but the leather thumped on Wagner's broad jersey and bounded high and wide, behind Lafayette's goal. Wagner followed up the play and scored Pittsburgh's first touchdown by falling on the ball back of the line." Peck was unsuccessful on the goal after and Pitt led 6-0. Lafayette had the ball on the Pitt 28-yard line as time ran out in the first half.

The third quarter was a back and forth of punts, interceptions and penalties highlighted by a 35-yard field goal attempt by Lafayette fullback Scheeren that went wide. The fourth quarter was more of the same. Lafayette gained possession at midfield and could not advance. They lined up to punt and the center snap was bobbled by Kelly and Hube Wagner "scooped it and was down the field like a flash. Wagner had no opposition in running the 47-yards for the second touchdown. Dillon kicked the resultant goal and the score read 13–0."

Grantland Rice weighed in on the legend of Hube Wagner: "Poking a ball towards Hans Wagner is about as safe as fumbling a ball around Capt. Wagner of University of Pittsburgh. The latter has gathered in enough fumbles this fall to fill a dormitory. When his hands give out, he must pick'em up with his teeth."

The Pitt lineup for the game against Lafayette was Fred Ammons and Harry Shof (left end), William Cowell and Claude Thornhill (left tackle), Wayne Smith (left guard), Isadore Shapira (center), Chuck Reese and “Red” Aughenbaugh (right guard), Mark Hoag and James Jones (right tackle), Hube Wagner (right end), Roy Heil (quarterback), Guy Williamson (left halfback), Robert Peck, Philip Dillon and Fred Ward (right ha;fback) and Leo Collibns and Fred Ammons (fullback). The game was played in 15-minute quarters.

=== Washington & Jefferson ===
Week 8: W. & J. at Pitt

Team	1	2	3	4	Total
• W. & J.	10	6	0	3	19
Pitt	0	6	0	0	6

- Date: November 15, 1913
- Location: Forbes Field
  Pittsburgh, PA
- Game start: 2:30 p.m.
- Referee: Wilmer G. Crowell (Swarthmore)

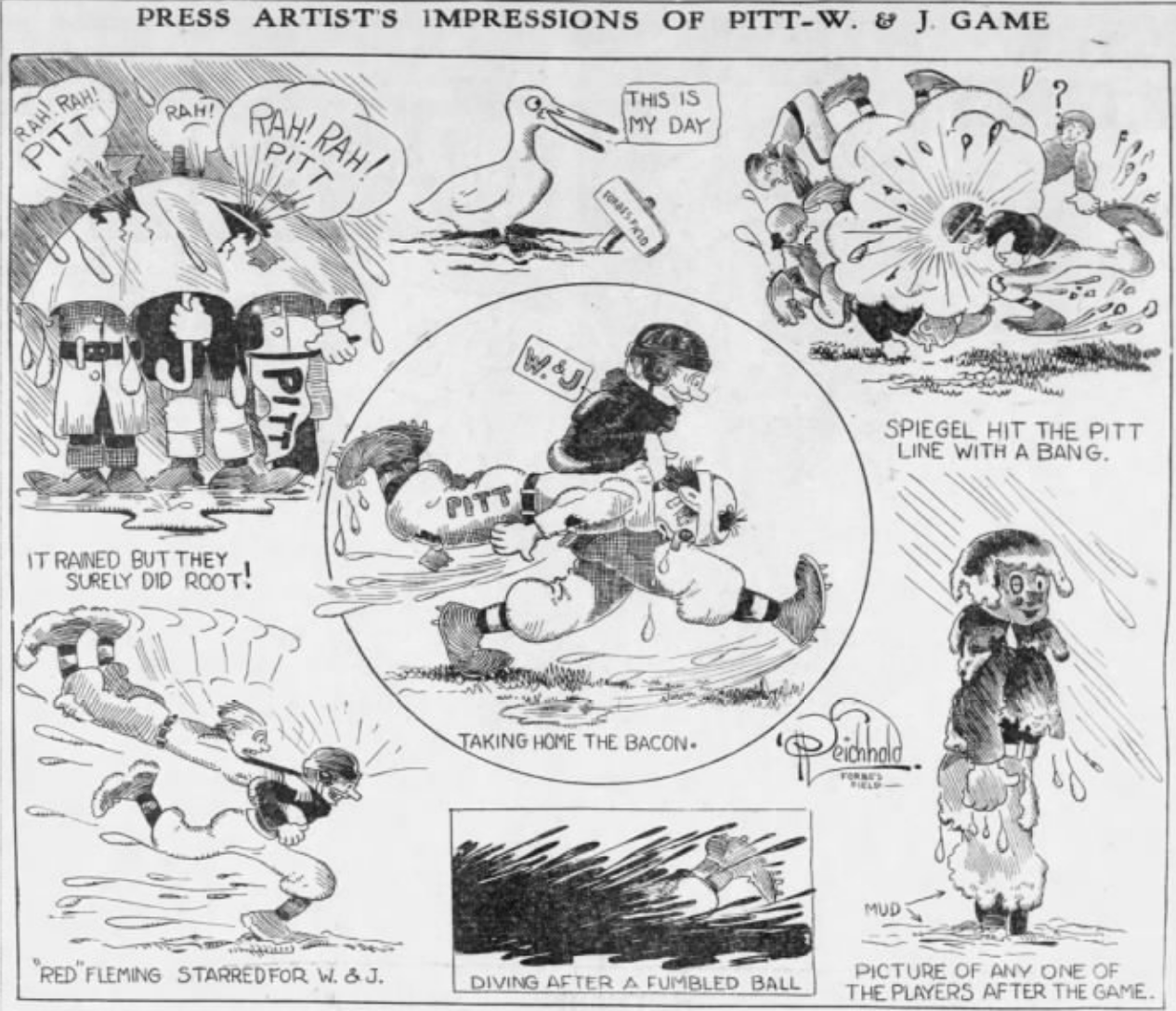
Sad day for Pitt

On Sunday, November 9 a snowstorm blew through Pittsburgh and deposited a 15 inch blanket of white across the city. Tuesday the Pitt squad needed to practice outdoors. The Pittsburgh Post described the dilemma:

"Two hundred undergraduates responded to the call of the student senate at the University of Pittsburgh (Tuesday) morning when Director Charlie Miller, who has general oversight of Pitt athletics, flushed out an S. O. S. signal for volunteers to clean the snow off Forbes Field. When it was ascertained on Monday morning that the heavy covering of snow that fell on Sunday would prevent the varsity football squad from using the gridiron for practice and that too, in spite of the fact that the climax of Pittsburgh's schedule comes with W. & J. this week, it was realized that heroic effort must be made immediately to clear the field that the team might begin practice immediately. When it was found that no horsepower scrapers were available, Director Miller took the question up with President Allen of the senate and it was decided to utilize the fiery loyalty of the students in the crisis at hand. No sooner said than done. The football management provided snow shovels and the undergraduates constructed wooden scrapers. The volunteers, 200 strong, were excused from classes at 1 o'clock and with a company of co-eds to add color and dispense refreshments the fun began. Scrapers scraped, shovels shoveled and wheelbarrows wheeled the snow off the field. At 2:30 the skeptics who had predicted the impossibility of the scheme began to depart in disgust, for the steadily increasing green space gave promise of the speedy conclusion of the operation. The field resembled an ant hill. Gangs of undergraduates hauled away at the scrapers, plied the shovels and pushed the barrows. From the sideline the soup line came and went, refreshed...The gravity of the football situation at the University of Pittsburgh is pretty well illustrated by the desperate methods that were taken yesterday in order to give the team the benefit of out-of-door practice."

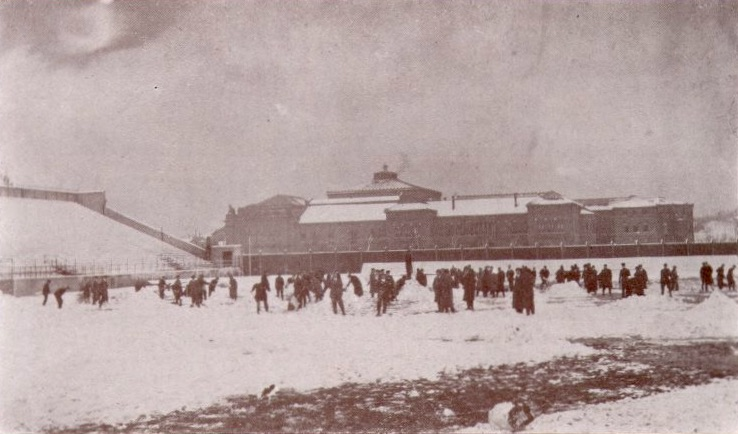
Snow removal from Forbes Field prior to W. & J. Game

On November 15 the fourteenth game between Pitt and Wash. & Jeff. took place on Forbes Field. W. & J. had a comfortable 9–4 lead in the series. The Red and Black, led by second-year head coach Bob Folwell, came into the game with a 6–0–1 record, heir only blemish being a scoreless tie with Yale. They finished the season with a 10–0–1 record and out score their opponents 360–13. The Red and Black lineup featured the school's three first time All-Americans: center Burleigh Cruikshank and halfbacks Red Fleming and Johnny Spiegel.

The Pitt Weekly reported: "Fighting bravely against overwhelming odds, on a field ankle-deep with mud, Pitt slipped and skidded to a 19–6 defeat before W. and J. at Forbes Field last Saturday. A constant drizzle lasted throughout the entire game, making an especially poor football day. In spite of the rain, a crowd of 20,000 rooters and spectators remained till the final whistle blew." The Pittsburgh Sunday Post was more dramatic with: "Eleven sweatered young men with a business-like mien came to the city yesterday from the little town with the big name and rubbed Pittsburgh's football nose in two inches of slime on Forbes Field. The score – Washington and Jefferson, 19; University of Pittsburgh, 6. The heavens wept." Ralph S. Davis of The Pittsburg Press reported: "In the presence of 25,000 wildly enthusiastic fans, the largest throng that ever witnessed a gridiron contest in Pittsburg, Washington & Jefferson yesterday won the football championship of western Pennsylvania defeating the University of Pittsburgh by the decisive score of 19–6...The gridiron warriors battled on a field actually ankle-deep in slimy, sticky mud."

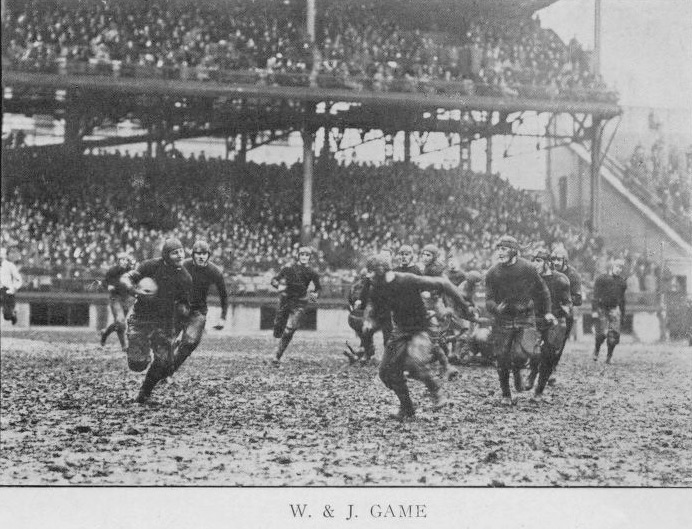
Pitt versus W. & J. game action

Washington & Jefferson wasted no time proving their superiority. On their first possession, the Red and Black offense started on their 30-yard line and ten plays later they were on Pitt's five yard line. All-American halfback John Spiegel "received the ball, and circling left end, crossed the line for a touchdown." Red Fleming added the point after. W & J 7 to Pitt 0. After the kickoff, the Pitt offense was forced to punt and the Red and Black had possession on the Pitt 44-yard line. On first down Fleming gained nineteen yards to the 25-yard line. The Pitt defense stiffened, but "on fourth down the rotund Patterson (W. & J. tackle) dropped back to the 28-yard line and, Goodwin assisting, kicked a goal from placement." W & J 10 to Pitt 0. At the end of the first quarter Pitt had possession on Wash. & Jeff's. 45-yard line.

The Pitt offense was forced to punt and Guy Williamson punted to W. & J. quarterback Goodwin. "The ball, which had been touched by Goodwin, rolled behind the goal line. While the W. & J. quarterback was taking his time, Pitt end Harry Shof rushed ahead of his teammates and fell on the ball across the line. Pitt was credited with a touchdown, but Williamson failed to kick goal." W. & J. 10 to Pitt 6. Later in the second quarter, the Red and Black offense gained possession on their 46-yard line. Seven running plays advanced the ball to the Pitt 10-yard line. John Spiegel "circled Wash. & Jeff.'s right end on a wide run that ended behind Pitt's goal in the corner of the field." The halftime score was W. & J. 16 to Pitt 6.

"In dry suits but without a change in either lineup the two teams took the field" for the second half. Mid-quarter, the Red and Black defense recovered a Pitt fumble on the Pitt 10-yard line. The Pitt defense held and regained possession on downs. The Pitt offense had the ball on their 34-yard line at the end of the third quarter, "second down and six to go." The W. & .J defense held and Pitt shanked the punt giving the Red and Black possession on the Pitt 45-yard line. First down John Spiegel raced thirty-three yards to the Pitt 12. The Pitt defense stalled the drive but Patterson kicked a 23 yard field goal to extend the lead to 19 to 6. The Pitt offense advanced the ball to the W. & J. 12-yard line and Roy Heil threw an interception in the end zone. The Red and Black beat Pitt for the tenth time.

Led by Johnny Spiegel with 87 yards, stat-wise, W. & J. out-gained Pitt 274 yards to 175 yards . Pitt fumbled 8 times while the Red and Black only fumbled 3 times. Pitt gained 6 first downs and punted 15 times. W. & J. earned 8 first downs and punted 9 times.

The Pittsburgh Sunday Post interviewed the captains. Hube Wagner mused: "I had dreams of leading my eleven to victory against Washington and Jefferson in the next to last game of my college career. We lost to a superior team. It was a great game." Captain Russ Goodwin was gracious in victory: "There is great satisfaction in all of us by beating Pitt, but there was still greater pleasure in playing against a fine bunch of fellows like the Pitt gridders. I'm glad we won but sorry they had to lose." Coach Duff

The Pitt lineup for the game against Washington & Jefferson was Hube Wagner (left end), William Cowell (left tackle), Chuck Reese (left guard), Isadore Shapira (center), Wayne Smith (right guard), Mark Hoag and James Jones (right tackle), Harry Shof, James Herron and Leo Collins (right end), Roy Heil (quarterback), Fred Ward and Philip Dillon (left halfback), Guy Williamson, Justice Egbert and Fred Ammons (right halfback), and Robert Peck and Fred Ward (fullback). The game was played in 15-minute quarters.

=== Penn State ===
Week 9: Penn State at Pitt

Team	1	2	3	4	Total
Penn State	0	6	0	0	6
• Pitt	0	7	0	0	7

- Date: November 27, 1913
- Location: Forbes Field
  Pittsburgh, PA
- Game start: 2:30 p.m.
- Referee: J. A. Evans (Williams)

The Pitt versus Penn State series at this point in history was 12–3 in favor of Penn State. Coach Bill Hollenback's 1913 team had won their first two games, but came into this game on a five game losing streak. The Pittsburgh Daily Post noted that despite their poor record their manager Ray Smith was confident of victory:

"Those who are figuring that State will enter the game on Thursday with thoughts of anything but a victory are fooling nobody so badly as themselves. It would take a defeat by Pittsburgh to make our season anything but a success and that defeat is not going to take place."

Pitt starting halfback Robert Peck needed to take an examination on Thursday morning to "bring his scholarship record up to par." He "burned the midnight oil. After five hours' sleep he was up again, and at 11 o'clock Thursday passed the exam with flying colors earning his right to represent Pitt." Pitt's lineup was set.

The 1915 Owl Yearbook presented this synopsis: "For the first time in three years, Thanksgiving Day was a real holiday for the loyal sons of Pitt. Penn State came to Pittsburgh and were defeated to the tune of 7 to 6, after one of the most stubborn battles of the year. A fine, drizzling rain fell all afternoon on a field of mud, while the fog was so thick all the players looked alike. Pitt showed a return almost to mid-season form, and State played a wonderful game from start to finish."

Florent Gibson of The Post offered his insight:"One point-one measly, little unit representing a touchdown goal, gentlemen, may on ordinary occasions seem to be a trifle not worth troubling about. But, infinitesimally small as it may be, 'twas enough to make all the difference in the world when Pitt met State in the closing struggle of the year at Forbes Field yesterday. The result was: Pitt, 7; State, 6. Such a little thing as it was, too, to plunge thousands 10 fathoms deep in gloom and elevate other thousands to the seventh heaven of happiness. It was just a little goal from touchdown that Williamson booted as a fitting climax to his run of 67 yards for the aforementioned touchdown. Shorty Miller blew his chance .... Hence the victory margin for Pitt."

According to The Philadelphia Inquirer: "The first period was productive of nothing more than short gains and long punts, the work of (Guy) Williamson and (John) Clark being of great value to their teams." On their second possession of the second quarter Penn State got a first down via a Pitt offside penalty at mid-field. John Clark carried the ball five times and caught a pass to advance the ball to Pitt's 3-yard line. "Pitt's defense made a desperate stand but Clark was pushed over on third down for their only touchdown." Quarterback Shorty Miller missed the goal after. State led 6 to 0. Penn State kicked off and Pitt had possession on their 28-yard line. Hube Wagner gained five yards on first down. On second down, "Williamson slipped through the line, ducked Clark, evaded Berryman and Tobin, dodged Shorty Miller and streaked for the goal line, going over in the corner of the field for a touchdown, after a run of 67-yards. The fleet little halfback raised Pitt's total to 7, the winning number, by booting the ball directly over the bar from the 20-yard line at a difficult angle."

"In the second half of the game State resorted to a more open style of play, while Pitt played on the defensive." Most of the third quarter was played in State territory. In the fourth period State advanced the ball to the Pitt 25-yard line and lost the ball on downs. After a change of possessions Pitt punted and Miller fumbled on his 30-yard line and James Herron recovered for Pitt. Wagner gained 3 yards and the game was over.

Ralph S. Davis of The Pittsburg Press noted: "It was a fine football battle under the most miserable conditions that have prevailed here this season. Despite the weather, an immense crowd turned out, and the enthusiasm was wonderful. The best of feeling prevailed between the opposing rooters.."

The Gazette Times reported: "Between halves the Pitt students formed into a serpentine parade and marched around the field four abreast. They danced to the grandstands and, led by Cheer-leaders Richardson, Morrison, Conway and Hazlett, gave every yell on the list. The Pitt band met the State band in front of the stand and together they played a popular song to which the students danced the Turkey Trot."

The Pitt lineup for the game against Penn State was James Herron (left end), William Cowell and Claude Thornhill (left tackle), Chuck Reese and Rendall Soppitt (left guard), Isadore Shapira (center), Wayne Smith (right guard), James Jones (right tackle), Hube Wagner (right end), Roy Heil (quarterback), Philip Dillon (left halfback), Guy Williamson (right halfback), and Robert Peck and Fred Ammons (fullback). The game was played in 15-minute quarters.

== Scoring summary ==
1913 Pittsburgh Panthers scoring summary
Player	Touchdowns	Extra points	Points
Hube Wagner	8	0	48
Philip Dillon	7	3	45
Guy Williamson	3	4	22
Robert Peck	2	6	20
Fred Ammons	2	0	12
Roy Heil	1	0	6
Harry Shof	1	0	6
Wayne Smith	1	0	6
Totals	25	15	165

== Postseason ==
Pitt finished the season 6-2-1 in Coach Duff's first year. They out scored their opponents 165-46.

Captain Hube Wagner was not on Walter Camp's All-American team, but did receive the honor from Parke H. Davis. He was also selected on the All-Eastern team by the following: Robert Folwell (W. & J.), William Hollenback (Penn State), John B. Streit (Princeton), George B. Underwood (N.Y. Press), Glenn S. Warner (Carlisle) and J.M. Duff (Pitt).

Guard Wayne B. "Red" Smith was elected Captain for the 1914 season at the year end banquet. He was a third year dental student and trained at Bellefonte Academy prior to enrolling at Pitt.

Coach Duff was hired for the 1914 season on December 10 by a unanimous vote of the Athletic Committee.
