= Harry Wolter =

American baseball player (1884–1970)

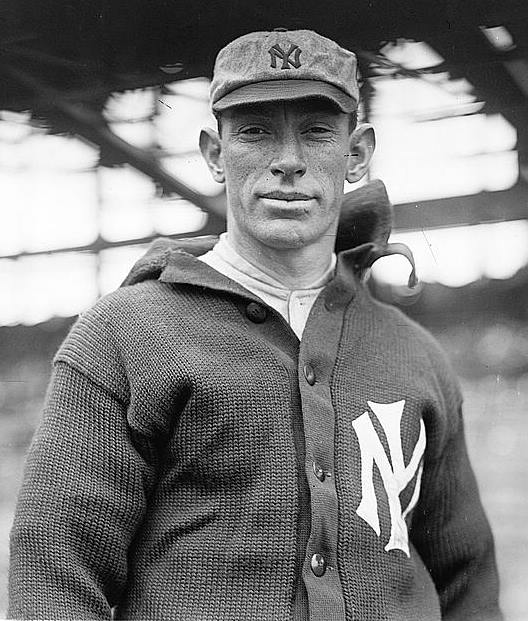
- Outfielder
- Born: July 11, 1884; Monterey, California, U.S.
- Died: July 6, 1970 (aged 85); Palo Alto, California, U.S.
- Batted: Left Threw: Right

MLB debut
- May 14, 1907, for the Cincinnati Reds

Last MLB appearance
- September 23, 1917, for the Chicago Cubs

MLB statistics
- Batting average: .270
- Home runs: 12
- Runs batted in: 167
- Stats at Baseball Reference

Teams
- Cincinnati Reds (1907); Pittsburgh Pirates (1907); St. Louis Cardinals (1907); Boston Red Sox (1909); New York Highlanders / Yankees (1910–1913); Chicago Cubs (1917)

Harry Meiggs Wolter (July 11, 1884 – July 7, 1970) was an American professional baseball player. He played all or part of seven seasons in Major League Baseball for the Cincinnati Reds (1907), Pittsburgh Pirates (1907), St. Louis Cardinals (1907), Boston Red Sox (1909), New York Highlanders/Yankees (1910–13) and Chicago Cubs (1917), primarily as an outfielder.

== Playing career ==
Wolter began his playing career after graduating from Santa Clara University in 1906. In seven major league seasons, Wolter played in 588 games and had 1,907 at bats, 286 runs, 514 hits, 69 doubles, 42 triples, 12 home runs, 167 RBI, 95 stolen bases, 268 walks, .270 batting average, .365 on-base percentage, .369 slugging percentage, 703 total bases and 56 sacrifice hits.

Wolter recorded the first hit at Fenway Park on April 20, 1912, a bunt single past Buck O'Brien that advanced Guy Zinn to second base. Wolter injured his ankle in a slide in the eighth inning of the same game.

As a pitcher, Wolter had a 4–6 win–loss record in 15 games, 9 as a starter, with 1 complete game, 5 games finished, 84 innings pitched, 96 hits allowed, 40 runs allowed, 35 earned runs allowed, 1 home run allowed, 50 walks allowed, 29 strikeouts, 6 hit batsmen, 3 wild pitches, 338 batters faced, a 3.75 ERA and a 1.738 WHIP.

Following his playing career, he coached baseball at Stanford University for 26 years, in 1916, from 1923 to 1943, and again from 1946 to 1949.

He died in Palo Alto, California at the age of 85.
