= Ferdie Moore =

American baseball player (1896-1947)

- First baseman
- Born: February 22, 1896; Camden, New Jersey
- Died: May 6, 1947 (aged 51); Atlantic City, New Jersey
- Batted: Unknown Threw: Unknown

MLB debut
- October 2, 1914, for the Philadelphia Athletics

Last MLB appearance
- October 3, 1914, for the Philadelphia Athletics

MLB statistics
- Batting average: .500
- Home runs: 0
- Runs batted in: 1
- Stats at Baseball Reference

Teams
- Philadelphia Athletics (1914)

Ferdinand De Paige Moore (February 22, 1896 – May 6, 1947) was an American Major League Baseball infielder. He played first base for the Philadelphia Athletics during the 1914 season at the age of just 18 years old. He also served in the Navy in World War II. In 1947, Moore committed suicide after fatally shooting a friend.
