= Toots Coyne =

American baseball player

- Third baseman
- Born: October 20, 1894; St. Louis, Missouri
- Died: September 18, 1939 (aged 44); St. Louis, Missouri
- Batted: Unknown Threw: Right

MLB debut
- September 28, 1914, for the Philadelphia Athletics

Last MLB appearance
- September 28, 1914, for the Philadelphia Athletics

MLB statistics
- Batting average: .000
- Home runs: 0
- Runs batted in: 0
- Stats at Baseball Reference

Teams
- Philadelphia Athletics (1914)

Martin Albert Coyne (October 20, 1894 – September 18, 1939) was an American Major League Baseball infielder. He played for the Philadelphia Athletics during the 1914 season.
