= Buck Sweeney =

American baseball player (1890-1955)

- Outfielder
- Born: April 15, 1890; Pittsburgh, Pennsylvania
- Died: March 13, 1955 (aged 64); Pittsburgh, Pennsylvania
- Batted: Unknown Threw: Unknown

MLB debut
- September 28, 1914, for the Philadelphia Athletics

Last MLB appearance
- September 28, 1914, for the Philadelphia Athletics

MLB statistics
- Games played: 1
- At bats: 1
- Hits: 0
- Stats at Baseball Reference

Teams
- Philadelphia Athletics (1914)

Charles Francis Sweeney (April 15, 1890 – March 13, 1955) was an outfielder in Major League Baseball. He played one game for the Philadelphia Athletics in 1914.
