= Ben Rochefort =

American baseball player (1896–1981)

- First baseman
- Born: August 15, 1896; Camden, New Jersey, US
- Died: April 2, 1981 (aged 84); Red Bank, New Jersey, US
- Batted: Left Threw: Right

MLB debut
- October 3, 1914, for the Philadelphia Athletics

Last MLB appearance
- October 3, 1914, for the Philadelphia Athletics

MLB statistics
- Batting average: .500
- Home runs: 0
- Runs batted in: 0
- Stats at Baseball Reference

Teams
- Philadelphia Athletics (1914)

Bennett Harold Rochefort (August 15, 1896 – April 2, 1981) was an American Major League Baseball first baseman. He played for the Philadelphia Athletics during the 1914 season. He played college ball at Temple University.
