= Fred Worden (baseball) =

American baseball player (1894-1941)

- Pitcher
- Born: September 4, 1894; St. Louis, Missouri
- Died: November 9, 1941 (aged 47); St. Louis, Missouri
- Batted: Right Threw: Right

MLB debut
- September 28, 1914, for the Philadelphia Athletics

Last MLB appearance
- September 28, 1914, for the Philadelphia Athletics

MLB statistics
- Win–loss record: 0-0
- Earned run average: 18.00
- Strikeouts: 1
- Stats at Baseball Reference

Teams
- Philadelphia Athletics (1914)

Frederick Bamford Worden (September 4, 1894 – November 9, 1941) was an American professional baseball pitcher. He appeared in one game in Major League Baseball for the Philadelphia Athletics during the 1914 season.
