= Billy Orr (baseball) =

American baseball player (1891-1967)

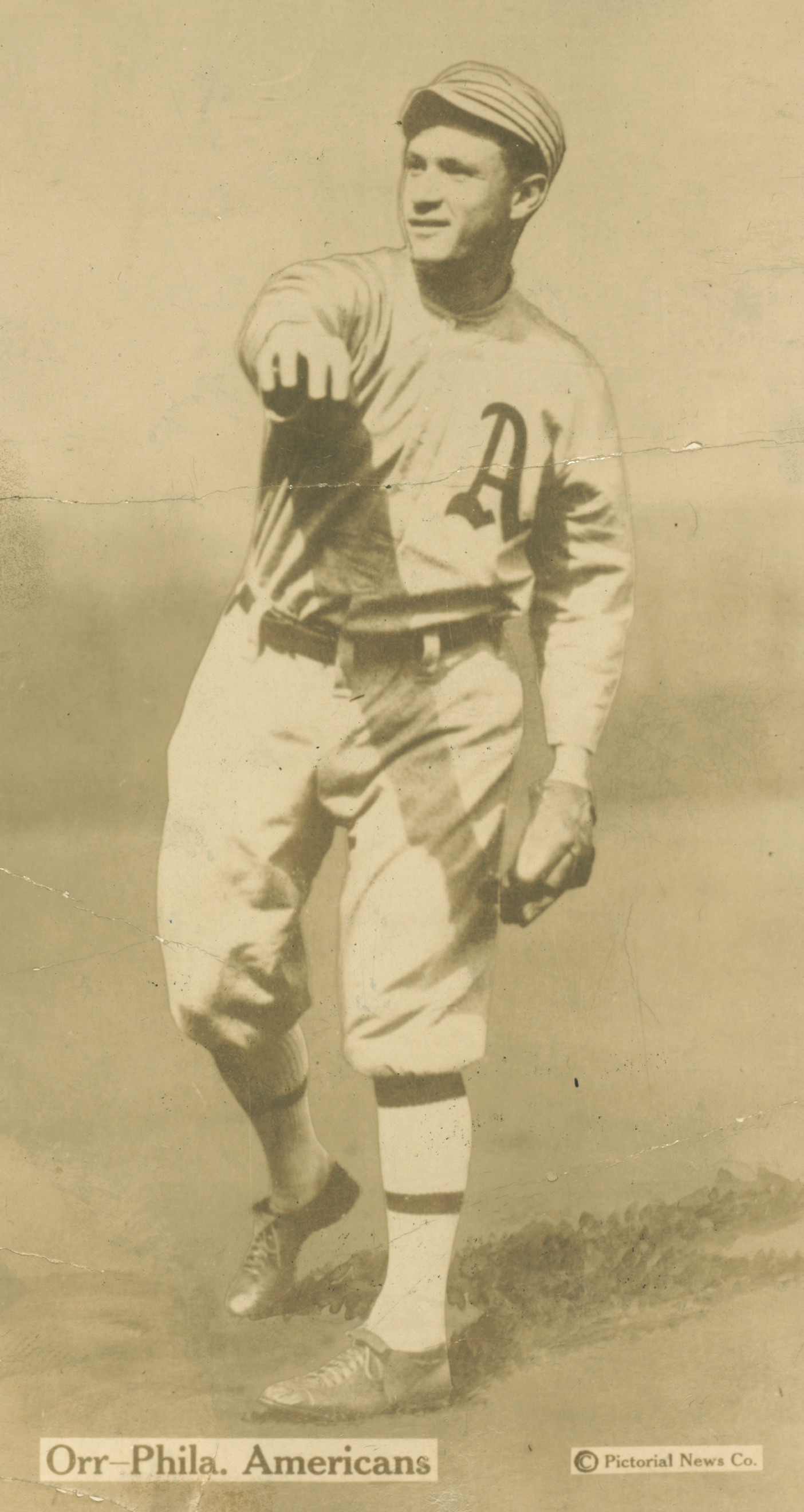
- Shortstop
- Born: April 22, 1891; San Francisco, California, US
- Died: March 10, 1967 (aged 75); St. Helena, California, US
- Batted: Right Threw: Right

MLB debut
- May 3, 1913, for the Philadelphia Athletics

Last MLB appearance
- May 22, 1914, for the Philadelphia Athletics

MLB statistics
- Batting average: .187
- Home runs: 0
- Runs batted in: 8
- Stats at Baseball Reference

Teams
- Philadelphia Athletics (1913–14)

Career highlights and awards
- World Series champion (1913)

William John Orr (April 22, 1891 – March 10, 1967) was an American Major League Baseball infielder. He played parts of two seasons in the majors, 1913 and 1914, for the Philadelphia Athletics. He played primarily at shortstop, but also played all three other infield positions.

After his major league career, Orr played for ten years in the Pacific Coast League. He also briefly served as head coach of the Stanford Cardinal baseball program, and managed the Salt Lake City Bees in 1926.

== Sources ==
- Career statistics from Baseball Reference · Baseball Reference (Minors) · Retrosheet · Baseball Almanac
