= Dean Sturgis =

American baseball player (1892–1950)

- Catcher
- Born: December 1, 1892; Beloit, Kansas
- Died: June 4, 1950 (aged 57); Uniontown, Pennsylvania
- Batted: Right Threw: Right

MLB debut
- May 1, 1914, for the Philadelphia Athletics

Last MLB appearance
- June 29, 1914, for the Philadelphia Athletics

MLB statistics
- Batting average: .250
- Home runs: 0
- Runs batted in: 0
- Stats at Baseball Reference

Teams
- Philadelphia Athletics (1914)

Dean Donnell Sturgis (December 1, 1892 – June 29, 1950) was an American Major League Baseball catcher. He played for the Philadelphia Athletics during the 1914 season. He was born in Beloit, Kansas and attended Bucknell University. He also played college baseball and football for the Bucknell Bison. In one college football game in 1913, he helped pull off a win against a then-undefeated Pittsburgh Panthers football team. He was invited to try out for the Philadelphia Athletics while still in college at Bucknell.
